= List of ICF Canoe Sprint World Championships medalists in men's kayak =

== Top 10 medalists ==
The following table ranks male kayak athletes by the total number of medals won at the ICF Canoe Sprint World Championships. It includes men's K-1, K-2, K-4 and kayak relay events. Each member of a medal-winning crew is credited with one medal. Mixed K-2 and K-4 events are excluded.

The ranking is current through the 2026 ICF Canoe Sprint World Championships, held in Poznań, Poland, from 26 to 30 August 2026.

Athletes are ranked by total medals, followed by gold, silver and bronze medals. The Medals column gives the athlete's individual World Championship medal history, including the year, event and host city.

Rank	Athlete	Country	Gold	Silver	Bronze	Total	Medals
1	Ronald Rauhe	Germany	16	5	5	26	Gold: 2001 K-1 200 m — Poznań; 2001 K-2 500 m — Poznań; 2002 K-1 200 m — Seville; 2002 K-2 500 m — Seville; 2003 K-1 200 m — Gainesville; 2003 K-2 500 m — Gainesville; 2005 K-2 500 m — Zagreb; 2006 K-1 200 m — Szeged; 2006 K-1 500 m — Szeged; 2006 K-2 500 m — Szeged; 2007 K-2 500 m — Duisburg; 2009 K-1 200 m — Dartmouth; 2009 K-1 500 m — Dartmouth; 2017 K-4 500 m — Račice; 2018 K-4 500 m — Montemor-o-Velho; 2019 K-4 500 m — Szeged. Silver: 2001 K-2 200 m — Poznań; 2007 K-2 200 m — Duisburg; 2009 K-1 4 × 200 m relay — Dartmouth; 2010 K-1 200 m — Poznań; 2014 K-2 200 m — Moscow. Bronze: 1999 K-1 200 m — Milan; 2002 K-2 200 m — Seville; 2003 K-2 200 m — Gainesville; 2011 K-1 200 m — Szeged; 2013 K-2 200 m — Duisburg.
2	Torsten Gutsche	Germany	11	5	4	20	Gold: 1989 K-2 500 m — Plovdiv; 1989 K-2 1000 m — Plovdiv; 1990 K-2 1000 m — Poznań; 1991 K-2 1000 m — Paris; 1993 K-2 500 m — Copenhagen; 1993 K-2 1000 m — Copenhagen; 1994 K-2 500 m — Mexico City; 1997 K-4 1000 m — Dartmouth; 1998 K-4 500 m — Szeged; 1998 K-4 1000 m — Szeged; 1999 K-4 500 m — Milan. Silver: 1991 K-2 500 m — Paris; 1991 K-2 10000 m — Paris; 1995 K-2 1000 m — Duisburg; 1997 K-4 500 m — Dartmouth; 1999 K-4 1000 m — Milan. Bronze: 1990 K-2 500 m — Poznań; 1990 K-4 1000 m — Poznań; 1994 K-2 200 m — Mexico City; 1997 K-4 200 m — Dartmouth.
3	Rüdiger Helm	East Germany	10	6	3	19	Gold: 1978 K-1 1000 m — Belgrade; 1979 K-1 1000 m — Duisburg; 1981 K-1 1000 m — Nottingham; 1982 K-1 1000 m — Belgrade; 1983 K-1 1000 m — Tampere; 1978 K-2 500 m — Belgrade; 1983 K-4 500 m — Tampere; 1978 K-4 1000 m — Belgrade; 1979 K-4 1000 m — Duisburg; 1981 K-4 1000 m — Nottingham. Silver: 1977 K-1 1000 m — Sofia; 1979 K-2 500 m — Duisburg; 1982 K-4 500 m — Belgrade; 1975 K-4 1000 m — Belgrade; 1982 K-4 1000 m — Belgrade; 1983 K-4 1000 m — Tampere. Bronze: 1975 K-1 1000 m — Belgrade; 1974 K-2 1000 m — Mexico City; 1981 K-4 500 m — Nottingham.
4	Fernando Pimenta	Portugal	7	6	6	19	Gold: 2017 K-1 5000 m — Račice; 2018 K-1 1000 m — Montemor-o-Velho; 2018 K-1 5000 m — Montemor-o-Velho; 2021 K-1 1000 m — Copenhagen; 2023 K-1 1000 m — Duisburg; 2026 K-1 1000 m —Poznań; - 2026 K-1 5000 m — Poznań ;. Silver: 2017 K-1 1000 m — Račice; 2021 K-1 5000 m — Copenhagen; 2022 K-1 1000 m — Dartmouth; 2023 K-1 5000 m — Duisburg; 2024 K-1 5000 m — Samarkand; 2025 K-1 5000 m — Milan. Bronze: 2015 K-1 1000 m — Milan; 2019 K-1 1000 m — Szeged; 2019 K-1 5000 m — Szeged; 2022 K-2 500 m — Dartmouth; 2025 K-1 1000 m — Milan; 2026 K-4 500 m — Poznań.
5	Ferenc Csipes	Hungary	8	4	4	16	Gold: 1985 K-1 1000 m — Mechelen; 1986 K-1 10000 m — Montreal; 1986 K-4 1000 m — Montreal; 1987 K-2 500 m — Duisburg; 1987 K-4 1000 m — Duisburg; 1989 K-4 1000 m — Plovdiv; 1990 K-4 1000 m — Poznań; 1991 K-4 1000 m — Paris. Silver: 1986 K-1 1000 m — Montreal; 1987 K-1 1000 m — Duisburg; 1991 K-1 1000 m — Paris; 1989 K-4 10000 m — Plovdiv. Bronze: 1987 K-2 10000 m — Duisburg; 1990 K-4 500 m — Poznań; 1991 K-2 500 m — Paris; 1994 K-4 500 m — Mexico City.
6	Marek Twardowski	Poland	2	9	4	15	Gold: 2006 K-1 500 m — Szeged; 2011 K-1 500 m — Szeged. Silver: 1999 K-2 500 m — Milan; 2002 K-2 200 m — Seville; 2002 K-2 500 m — Seville; 2003 K-2 200 m — Gainesville; 2003 K-2 500 m — Gainesville; 2005 K-2 200 m — Zagreb; 2005 K-2 500 m — Zagreb; 2006 K-2 200 m — Szeged; 2006 K-2 500 m — Szeged. Bronze: 1999 K-2 200 m — Milan; 2007 K-1 500 m — Duisburg; 2005 K-4 1000 m — Zagreb; 2006 K-4 200 m — Szeged.
7	Kay Bluhm	Germany	7	4	3	14	Gold: 1989 K-2 500 m — Plovdiv; 1989 K-2 1000 m — Plovdiv; 1990 K-2 1000 m — Poznań; 1991 K-2 1000 m — Paris; 1993 K-2 500 m — Copenhagen; 1993 K-2 1000 m — Copenhagen; 1994 K-2 500 m — Mexico City. Silver: 1989 K-2 500 m — Plovdiv; 1990 K-2 500 m — Poznań; 1991 K-2 500 m — Paris; 1991 K-2 10000 m — Paris. Bronze: 1990 K-2 500 m — Poznań; 1990 K-4 1000 m — Poznań; 1994 K-2 200 m — Mexico City.
8	Zsolt Gyulay	Hungary	6	4	4	14	Gold: 1986 K-4 1000 m — Montreal; 1987 K-4 1000 m — Duisburg; 1989 K-1 1000 m — Plovdiv; 1989 K-4 1000 m — Plovdiv; 1990 K-4 1000 m — Poznań; 1991 K-4 1000 m — Paris. Silver: 1986 K-1 500 m — Montreal; 1993 K-4 1000 m — Copenhagen; 1995 K-2 500 m — Duisburg; 1995 K-4 1000 m — Duisburg. Bronze: 1991 K-1 500 m — Paris; 1991 K-2 500 m — Paris; 1993 K-4 500 m — Copenhagen; 1995 K-2 200 m — Duisburg.
9	Vladimir Parfenovich	Soviet Union	9	3	0	12	Gold: 1979 K-1 500 m — Duisburg; 1979 K-2 500 m — Duisburg; 1981 K-1 500 m — Nottingham; 1981 K-2 500 m — Nottingham; 1981 K-2 1000 m — Nottingham; 1982 K-1 500 m — Belgrade; 1982 K-2 500 m — Belgrade; 1982 K-2 1000 m — Belgrade; 1983 K-1 500 m — Tampere. Silver: 1978 K-1 500 m — Belgrade; 1983 K-2 500 m — Tampere; 1983 K-2 1000 m — Tampere.
10	Max Hoff	Germany	7	5	0	12	Gold: 2009 K-1 1000 m — Dartmouth; 2010 K-1 1000 m — Poznań; 2011 K-1 5000 m — Szeged; 2011 K-4 1000 m — Szeged; 2013 K-1 1000 m — Duisburg; 2018 K-2 1000 m — Montemor-o-Velho; 2019 K-2 1000 m — Szeged. Silver: 2010 K-1 5000 m — Poznań; 2014 K-1 5000 m — Moscow; 2015 K-1 5000 m — Milan; 2017 K-1 5000 m — Račice; 2019 K-1 5000 m — Szeged.

== Sources ==
- "2026 ICF Canoe Sprint and Paracanoe World Championships". International Canoe Federation.
- "Results — ICF Canoe Sprint". International Canoe Federation.

This is a list of medalists from the ICF Canoe Sprint World Championships in men's kayak.

== K-1 200 m ==
Debuted: 1994.

Games	Gold	Silver	Bronze
1994 Mexico City	Sergey Kalesnik (BLR)	Vince Fehérvári (HUN)	Miguel García (ESP)
1995 Duisburg	Piotr Markiewicz (POL)	Sergey Kalesnik (BLR)	Renn Crichlow (CAN)
1997 Dartmouth	Vince Fehérvári (HUN)	Grzegorz Kotowicz (POL)	Oleksiy Slivinskiy (UKR)
1998 Szeged	Michael Kolganov (ISR)	Oleksiy Slivinskiy (UKR)	Ognjen Filipović (YUG)
1999 Milan	Michael Kolganov (ISR)	Oleksiy Slivinskiy (UKR)	Ronald Rauhe (GER)
2001 Poznań	Ronald Rauhe (GER)	Oleksiy Slivinskiy (UKR)	Anton Ryakhov (UZB)
2002 Seville	Ronald Rauhe (GER)	Anton Ryakhov (UZB)	Romas Petrukanecas (LTU)
2003 Gainesville	Ronald Rauhe (GER)	Vince Fehérvári (AUS)	Anton Ryakhov (UZB)
2005 Zagreb	Carlos Pérez (ESP)	Tomasz Mendelski (POL)	Anton Ryakhov (RUS)
2006 Szeged	Ronald Rauhe (GER)	Carlos Pérez (ESP)	Mykola Kremer (UKR)
2007 Duisburg	Jonas Ems (GER)	Vytautas Vaičikonis (LTU)	Gergely Gyertyános (HUN)
2009 Dartmouth	Ronald Rauhe (GER)	Oleg Kharytonov (UKR)	Artem Kononuk (RUS)
2010 Poznań	Ed McKeever (GBR)	Ronald Rauhe (GER)	Piotr Siemionowski (POL)
2011 Szeged	Piotr Siemionowski (POL)	Ed McKeever (GBR)	Ronald Rauhe (GER)
2013 Duisburg	Petter Öström (SWE)	Mark de Jonge (CAN)	Saúl Craviotto (ESP)
2014 Moscow	Mark de Jonge (CAN)	Petter Menning (SWE)	Ed McKeever (GBR); Saúl Craviotto (ESP)
2015 Milan	Mark de Jonge (CAN)	Maxime Beaumont (FRA)	Petter Menning (SWE)
2017 Račice (Note: Bence Horváth of Hungary, who originally won silver, was disqualified on 25 March 2018 after it emerged he tested positive for EPO on 12 June 2017.)	Liam Heath (GBR)	Aleksejs Rumjancevs (LAT)	Evgenii Lukantsov (RUS)
2018 Montemor-o-Velho	Carlos Garrote (ESP)	Artūras Seja (LTU)	Evgenii Lukantsov (RUS)
2019 Szeged	Liam Heath (GBR)	Strahinja Stefanović (SRB)	Carlos Garrote (ESP)
2021 Copenhagen	Andrea Di Liberto (ITA)	Petter Menning (SWE)	Roberts Akmens (LAT)
2022 Dartmouth	Carlos Arévalo (ESP)	Petter Menning (SWE)	Kolos Csizmadia (HUN)
2023 Duisburg	Artūras Seja (LTU)	Badri Kavelashvili (GEO)	Carlos Garrote (ESP)
2024 Samarkand	Messias Baptista (POR)	Jakub Stepun (POL)	Carlos Garrote (ESP)
2025 Milan	Kolos Csizmadia (HUN)	Andrea Di Liberto (ITA)	Badri Kavelashvili (GEO)
2026 Poznán	Andrea Di Liberto (ITA)	Marko Dragosavljević (SRB)	Carlos Arévalo (ESP)

== K-1 500 m ==
Debuted: 1948.

Games	Gold	Silver	Bronze
1948 London	Gert Fredriksson (SWE)	Lars Glassér (SWE)	Poul Agger (DEN)
1950 Copenhagen	Johan Kobberup (DEN)	Lennart Klingström (SWE)	Andreas Lind (DEN)
1954 Mâcon	Gert Fredriksson (SWE)	Meinrad Miltenberger (GER)	Mircea Anastasescu (ROU)
1958 Prague	Stefan Kapłaniak (POL)	Gert Fredriksson (SWE)	Dieter Krause (GDR)
1963 Jajce	Aurel Vernescu (ROU)	Erik Hansen (DEN)	Kálmán Kovács (HUN)
1966 East Berlin	Aurel Vernescu (ROU)	Erik Hansen (DEN)	Paul Hoekstra (NED)
1970 Copenhagen	Anatoliy Tischenko (URS)	Grzegorz Śledziewski (POL)	Jean-Pierre Burny (BEL)
1971 Belgrade	Nikolay Gogol (URS)	Ladislav Souček (TCH)	Mihály Hesz (HUN)
1973 Tampere	Géza Csapó (HUN)	Vitaliy Trukshin (URS)	Grzegorz Śledziewski (POL)
1974 Mexico City	Vasile Dîba (ROU)	Géza Csapó (HUN)	Grzegorz Śledziewski (POL)
1975 Belgrade	Géza Csapó (HUN)	Vasile Dîba (ROU)	Grzegorz Śledziewski (POL)
1977 Sofia	Vasile Dîba (ROU)	Grzegorz Śledziewski (POL)	Zoltán Sztanity (HUN)
1978 Belgrade	Vasile Dîba (ROU)	Vladimir Parfenovich (URS)	Peter Hempel (GDR)
1979 Duisburg	Vladimir Parfenovich (URS)	John Sumegi (AUS)	Peter Hempel (GDR)
1981 Nottingham	Vladimir Parfenovich (URS)	Ion Bîrlădeanu (ROU)	Lars-Erik Moberg (SWE)
1982 Belgrade	Vladimir Parfenovich (URS)	Peter Hempel (GDR)	Lars-Erik Moberg (SWE)
1983 Tampere	Vladimir Parfenovich (URS)	Ian Ferguson (NZL)	Andreas Stähle (GDR)
1985 Mechelen	Andreas Stähle (GDR)	Oliver Seack (FRG)	Bernard Brégeon (FRA)
1986 Montreal	Jeremy West (GBR)	Zsolt Gyulay (HUN)	Igor Nagayev (URS)
1987 Duisburg	Paul MacDonald (NZL)	Andreas Stähle (GDR)	Attila Szabó (TCH)
1989 Plovdiv	Martin Hunter (AUS)	Kay Bluhm (GDR)	Mike Herbert (USA)
1990 Poznań	Sergey Kalesnik (URS)	Mike Herbert (USA)	Martin Hunter (AUS)
1991 Paris	Renn Crichlow (CAN)	Knut Holmann (NOR)	Zsolt Gyulay (HUN)
1993 Copenhagen	Mikko Kolehmainen (FIN)	Renn Crichlow (CAN)	Daniel Collins (AUS)
1994 Mexico City	Zsombor Borhi (HUN)	Daniel Collins (AUS)	Knut Holmann (NOR)
1995 Duisburg	Piotr Markiewicz (POL)	Knut Holmann (NOR)	Geza Magyar (ROU)
1997 Dartmouth	Botond Storcz (HUN)	Grzegorz Kotowicz (POL)	Antonio Rossi (ITA)
1998 Szeged	Ákos Vereckei (HUN)	Michael Kolganov (ISR)	Lutz Liwowski (GER)
1999 Milan	Ákos Vereckei (HUN)	Petar Merkov (BUL)	Grzegorz Kotowicz (POL)
2001 Poznań	Ákos Vereckei (HUN)	Anton Ryakhov (UZB)	Javier Correa (ARG)
2002 Seville	Nathan Baggaley (AUS)	Petar Merkov (BUL)	Anton Ryakhov (UZB)
2003 Gainesville	Nathan Baggaley (AUS)	Carlos Pérez (ESP)	Lutz Altepost (GER)
2005 Zagreb	Nathan Baggaley (AUS)	Lutz Altepost (GER)	Adam van Koeverden (CAN)
2006 Szeged	Marek Twardowski (POL)	Anton Ryakhov (RUS)	Lutz Altepost (GER)
2007 Duisburg	Adam van Koeverden (CAN)	Tim Brabants (GBR)	Marek Twardowski (POL)
2009 Dartmouth	Ronald Rauhe (GER)	Anders Gustafsson (SWE)	Ken Wallace (AUS)
2010 Poznań	Anders Gustafsson (SWE)	Peter Gelle (SVK)	Adam van Koeverden (CAN)
2011 Szeged	Marek Twardowski (POL)	Pavel Miadzvedzeu (BLR)	Yury Postrigay (RUS)
2013 Duisburg	Tom Liebscher (GER)	René Holten Poulsen (DEN)	Arnaud Hybois (FRA)
2014 Moscow	René Holten Poulsen (DEN)	Bence Dombvári (HUN)	Marcus Walz (ESP)
2015 Milan	René Holten Poulsen (DEN)	Tom Liebscher (GER)	Roman Anoshkin (RUS)
2017 Račice	Josef Dostál (CZE)	René Holten Poulsen (DEN)	Oleh Kukharyk (UKR)
2018 Montemor-o-Velho	Josef Dostál (CZE)	Tom Liebscher (GER)	Bence Nádas (HUN)
2019 Szeged	Tom Liebscher (GER)	Mikita Borykau (BLR)	Maxim Spesivtsev (RUS)
2021 Copenhagen	Mikita Borykau (BLR)	João Ribeiro (POR)	Moritz Florstedt (GER)
2022 Dartmouth	Josef Dostál (CZE)	Jean van der Westhuyzen (AUS)	Fernando Pimenta (POR)
2023 Duisburg	Bálint Kopasz (HUN)	Jean van der Westhuyzen (AUS)	Fernando Pimenta (POR)
2024 Samarkand	Josef Dostál (CZE)	Fernando Pimenta (POR)	Uladzislau Kravets (AIN)
2025 Milan	Josef Dostál (CZE)	Ádám Varga (HUN)	Alex Graneri (ESP)
2026 Poznán	Thomas Green (AUS)	Ádám Varga (HUN)	Alex Borucki (POL)

== K-1 1000 m ==
Debuted: 1938. Not held: 1948. Resumed: 1950.

Games	Gold	Silver	Bronze
1938 Vaxholm	Karl Widmark (SWE)	Helmut Cämmerer (GER)	Gregor Hradetzky (AUT)
1950 Copenhagen	Gert Fredriksson (SWE)	Thorvald Strömberg (FIN)	Lars Petterson (SWE)
1954 Mâcon	Gert Fredriksson (SWE)	Louis Gantois (FRA)	Ferenc Hatlaczky (HUN)
1958 Prague	Fritz Briel (GER)	Ferenc Hatlaczky (HUN)	Gert Fredriksson (SWE)
1963 Jajce	Erik Hansen (DEN)	Aurel Vernescu (ROU)	Siegfried Rossberg (GDR)
1966 East Berlin	Aleksandr Shaparenko (URS)	Erik Hansen (DEN)	Imre Kemecsey (HUN)
1970 Copenhagen	Aleksandr Shaparenko (URS)	Lars Andersson (SWE)	Grzegorz Śledziewski (POL)
1971 Belgrade	Grzegorz Śledziewski (POL)	Lars Andersson (SWE)	Aleksandr Shaparenko (URS)
1973 Tampere	Géza Csapó (HUN)	Grzegorz Śledziewski (POL)	Aleksandr Shaparenko (URS)
1974 Mexico City	Géza Csapó (HUN)	Grzegorz Śledziewski (POL)	Oreste Perri (ITA)
1975 Belgrade	Oreste Perri (ITA); Grzegorz Śledziewski (POL)	None	Rüdiger Helm (GDR)
1977 Sofia	Vasile Dîba (ROU)	Rüdiger Helm (GDR)	Oreste Perri (ITA)
1978 Belgrade	Rüdiger Helm (GDR)	Milan Janić (YUG)	Vitaliy Trukshin (URS)
1979 Duisburg	Rüdiger Helm (GDR)	Ion Bîrlădeanu (ROU)	Felix Masár (TCH)
1981 Nottingham	Rüdiger Helm (GDR)	Ion Bîrlădeanu (ROU)	Einar Rasmussen (NOR)
1982 Belgrade	Rüdiger Helm (GDR)	Alan Thompson (NZL)	Einar Rasmussen (NOR)
1983 Tampere	Rüdiger Helm (GDR)	Artūras Vieta (URS)	Alan Thompson (NZL)
1985 Mechelen	Ferenc Csipes (HUN)	Heiko Zinke (GDR)	Kalle Sundqvist (SWE)
1986 Montreal	Jeremy West (GBR)	Ferenc Csipes (HUN)	Harry Nolte (GDR)
1987 Duisburg	Greg Barton (USA)	Ferenc Csipes (HUN)	Morten Ivarsen (NOR)
1989 Plovdiv	Zsolt Gyulay (HUN)	Torsten Krentz (GDR)	Kalle Sundqvist (SWE)
1990 Poznań	Knut Holmann (NOR)	Maciej Freimut (POL)	Philippe Boccara (FRA)
1991 Paris	Knut Holmann (NOR)	Ferenc Csipes (HUN)	Greg Barton (USA)
1993 Copenhagen	Knut Holmann (NOR)	Thor Nielsen (DEN)	Marin Popescu (ROU)
1994 Mexico City	Clint Robinson (AUS)	Zsolt Borhi (HUN)	Knut Holmann (NOR)
1995 Duisburg	Knut Holmann (NOR)	Clint Robinson (AUS)	Lutz Liwowski (GER)
1997 Dartmouth	Botond Storcz (HUN)	Beniamino Bonomi (ITA)	Knut Holmann (NOR)
1998 Szeged	Lutz Liwowski (GER)	Knut Holmann (NOR)	Javier Correa (ARG)
1999 Milan	Lutz Liwowski (GER)	Knut Holmann (NOR)	Torsten Tranum (DEN)
2001 Poznań	Babak Amir-Tahmasseb (FRA)	Javier Correa (ARG)	Lutz Liwowski (GER)
2002 Seville	Eirik Verås Larsen (NOR)	Javier Correa (ARG)	Adam Seroczyński (POL)
2003 Gainesville	Ben Fouhy (NZL)	Adam van Koeverden (CAN)	Nathan Baggaley (AUS)
2005 Zagreb	Eirik Verås Larsen (NOR)	Adam van Koeverden (CAN)	Nathan Baggaley (AUS)
2006 Szeged	Markus Oscarsson (SWE)	Tim Brabants (GBR)	Ben Fouhy (NZL)
2007 Duisburg	Tim Brabants (GBR)	Adam van Koeverden (CAN)	Eirik Verås Larsen (NOR)
2009 Dartmouth	Max Hoff (GER)	Anders Gustafsson (SWE)	Adam van Koeverden (CAN)
2010 Poznań	Max Hoff (GER)	Tim Brabants (GBR)	Aleh Yurenia (BLR)
2011 Szeged	Adam van Koeverden (CAN)	Anders Gustafsson (SWE)	Eirik Verås Larsen (NOR)
2013 Duisburg	Max Hoff (GER)	Ken Wallace (AUS)	Bence Dombvári (HUN)
2014 Moscow	Josef Dostál (CZE)	Miroslav Kirchev (BUL)	René Holten Poulsen (DEN)
2015 Milan	René Holten Poulsen (DEN)	Josef Dostál (CZE)	Fernando Pimenta (POR)
2017 Račice	Tom Liebscher (GER)	Fernando Pimenta (POR)	Josef Dostál (CZE)
2018 Montemor-o-Velho	Fernando Pimenta (POR)	Max Rendschmidt (GER)	Josef Dostál (CZE)
2019 Szeged	Bálint Kopasz (HUN)	Josef Dostál (CZE)	Fernando Pimenta (POR)
2021 Copenhagen	Fernando Pimenta (POR)	Bálint Kopasz (HUN)	Aleh Yurenia (BLR)
2022 Dartmouth	Bálint Kopasz (HUN)	Fernando Pimenta (POR)	Jacob Schopf (GER)
2023 Duisburg	Fernando Pimenta (POR)	Ádám Varga (HUN)	Jakob Thordsen (GER)
2025 Milan	Bálint Kopasz (HUN)	Thomas Green (AUS)	Fernando Pimenta (POR)
2026 Poznán	Fernando Pimenta (POR)	Bálint Kopasz (HUN)	Thomas Green (AUS)

== K-1 5000 m ==
Debuted: 2010

Games	Gold	Silver	Bronze
2010 Poznań	Ken Wallace (AUS)	Max Hoff (GER)	Maximilian Benassi (ITA)
2011 Szeged	Max Hoff (GER)	Aleh Yurenia (BLR)	Maximilian Benassi (ITA)
2013 Duisburg	Ken Wallace (AUS)	Daniel Dal Bo (ARG)	Edward Rutherford (GBR)
2014 Moscow	Ken Wallace (AUS)	Max Hoff (GER)	Cyrille Carré (FRA)
2015 Milan	Ken Wallace (AUS)	Max Hoff (GER)	Aleh Yurenia (BLR)
2017 Račice	Fernando Pimenta (POR)	Max Hoff (GER)	Aleh Yurenia (BLR)
2018 Montemor-o-Velho	Fernando Pimenta (POR)	René Holten Poulsen (DEN)	Javier Hernanz (ESP)
2019 Szeged	Aleh Yurenia (BLR)	Max Hoff (GER)	Fernando Pimenta (POR)
2021 Copenhagen	Bálint Noé (HUN)	Fernando Pimenta (POR)	Mads Pedersen (DEN)
2022 Dartmouth	Joakim Lindberg (SWE)	Tamás Gecső (GER)	Francisco Cubelos (ESP)
2023 Duisburg	Mads Pedersen (DEN)	Fernando Pimenta (POR)	Nico Paufler (GER)
2024 Samarkand	Mads Pedersen (DEN)	Fernando Pimenta (POR)	Joakim Lindberg (SWE)
2025 Milan	Mads Pedersen (DEN)	Hamish Lovemore (RSA)	Ádám Varga (HUN)
2026 Poznán	Fernando Pimenta (POR)	Hamish Lovemore (RSA)	Mads Pedersen (DEN)

== K-1 10000 m ==
Debuted: 1938. Not held: 1948. Resumed: 1950. Discontinued: 1993. Folding appeared only in 1938.

Games	Gold	Silver	Bronze
1938 Vaxholm	Karl Widmark (SWE)	Czesław Sobieraj (POL)	Egon Nilsson (SWE)
1938 Vaxholm (folding)	Arne Bogren (SWE)	Kamill Balatoni (HUN)	Günter Nowatzki (GER)
1950 Copenhagen	Thorvald Strömberg (FIN)	Gert Fredriksson (SWE)	Arne Jansson (SWE)
1954 Mâcon	Ferenc Hatlaczky (HUN)	Miloš Pech (TCH)	Harald Eriksen (NOR)
1958 Prague	Thorvald Strömberg (FIN)	Ladislav Čepčianský (TCH)	Vagn Schmidt (DEN)
1963 Jajce	Fritz Briel (GER)	Sven-Olov Sjödelius (SWE)	Mihály Hesz (HUN)
1966 East Berlin	Mihály Hesz (HUN)	Vladimir Zemlyakov (URS)	Fritz Briel (GER)
1970 Copenhagen	Viktor Tsaryov (URS)	Erik Hansen (DEN)	Péter Völgyi (HUN)
1971 Belgrade	Viktor Tsaryov (URS)	Péter Völgyi (HUN)	Jochen Schneider (GER)
1973 Tampere	Aleksandr Shaparenko (URS)	Péter Völgyi (HUN)	Flemming Andersen (DEN)
1974 Mexico City	Oreste Perri (ITA)	Aleksandr Shaparenko (URS)	Péter Völgyi (HUN)
1975 Belgrade	Oreste Perri (ITA)	Erich Pasch (GER)	Kazimierz Nikin (POL)
1977 Sofia	Oreste Perri (ITA)	István Fábián (HUN)	Nikolay Stepanenko (URS)
1978 Belgrade	Milan Janić (YUG)	Nikolay Stepanenko (URS)	István Joós (HUN)
1979 Duisburg	Milan Janić (YUG)	Einar Rasmussen (NOR)	Nikolay Stepanenko (URS)
1981 Nottingham	Einar Rasmussen (NOR)	Milan Janić (YUG)	István Fábián (HUN)
1982 Belgrade	Milan Janić (YUG)	Einar Rasmussen (NOR)	Nikolay Astapkovich (URS)
1983 Tampere	Einar Rasmussen (NOR)	Milan Janić (YUG)	Rick Daman (NED)
1985 Mechelen	Greg Barton (USA)	László Nieberl (HUN)	Grant Bramwell (NZL)
1986 Montreal	Ferenc Csipes (HUN)	Bernard Brégeon (FRA)	Stanislav Boreyko (URS)
1987 Duisburg	Greg Barton (USA)	Attila Szabó (TCH)	Einar Rasmussen (NOR)
1989 Plovdiv	Attila Szabó (TCH)	Stanislav Boreyko (URS)	José Garcia (POR)
1990 Poznań	Philippe Boccara (FRA)	Greg Barton (USA)	Torsten Krentz (GDR)
1991 Paris	Greg Barton (USA)	Beniamino Bonomi (ITA)	Morten Ivarsen (NOR)
1993 Copenhagen	Thor Nielsen (DEN)	Knut Holmann (NOR)	Attila Szabó (SVK)

== K-2 200 m ==
Debuted: 1994.

Games	Gold	Silver	Bronze
1994 Mexico City	Maciej Freimut; Adam Wysocki; Poland	Romică Șerban; Daniel Stoian; Romania	Kay Bluhm; Torsten Gutsche; Germany
1995 Duisburg	Stein Jorgensen; John Mooney; United States	Romică Șerban; Daniel Stoian; Romania	Zsolt Gyulay; Krisztián Bártfai; Hungary
1997 Dartmouth	Vince Fehérvári; Róbert Hegedűs; Hungary	Beniamino Bonomi; Paolo Tommasini; Italy	Henrik Andersson; Henrik Nilsson; Sweden
1998 Szeged	Vince Fehérvári; Róbert Hegedűs; Hungary	Sergey Verlin; Anatoly Tishchenko; Russia	Geza Magyar; Romică Șerban; Romania
1999 Milan	Vince Fehérvári; Róbert Hegedűs; Hungary	Roman Zarubin; Aleksandr Ivanik; Russia	Marek Twardowski; Adam Wysocki; Poland
2001 Poznań	Alvydas Duonėla; Egidijus Balčiūnas; Lithuania	Ronald Rauhe; Tim Wieskötter; Germany	Mykola Zaichenkov; Mykhaylo Luchnik; Ukraine
2002 Seville	Alvydas Duonėla; Egidijus Balčiūnas; Lithuania	Marek Twardowski; Adam Wysocki; Poland	Ronald Rauhe; Tim Wieskötter; Germany
2003 Gainesville	Alvydas Duonėla; Egidijus Balčiūnas; Lithuania	Marek Twardowski; Adam Wysocki; Poland	Ronald Rauhe; Tim Wieskötter; Germany
2005 Zagreb	Dragan Zorić; Ognjen Filipović; Serbia and Montenegro	Alvydas Duonėla; Egidijus Balčiūnas; Lithuania	Marek Twardowski; Adam Wysocki; Poland
2006 Szeged	Ronald Rauhe; Tim Wieskötter; Germany	Marek Twardowski; Adam Wysocki; Poland	Dragan Zorić; Ognjen Filipović; Serbia
2007 Duisburg	Raman Piatrushenka; Vadzim Makhneu; Belarus	Ronald Rauhe; Tim Wieskötter; Germany	Dragan Zorić; Ognjen Filipović; Serbia
2009 Dartmouth	Raman Piatrushenka; Vadzim Makhneu; Belarus	Saúl Craviotto; Carlos Pérez; Spain	Andrew Willows; Richard Dober Jr. Canada
2010 Poznań	Arnaud Hybois; Sébastien Jouve; France	Saúl Craviotto; Carlos Pérez; Spain	Liam Heath; Jon Schofield; United Kingdom
2011 Szeged	Arnaud Hybois; Sébastien Jouve; France	Jon Schofield; Liam Heath; United Kingdom	Raman Piatrushenka; Vadzim Makhneu; Belarus
2013 Duisburg	Yury Postrigay; Alexander Dyachenko; Russia	Liam Heath; Jon Schofield; United Kingdom	Ronald Rauhe; Jonas Ems; Germany
2014 Moscow	Nebojša Grujić; Marko Novaković; Serbia	Tom Liebscher; Ronald Rauhe; Germany	Maxime Beaumont; Sébastien Jouve; France
2015 Milan	Sándor Tótka; Péter Molnár; Hungary	Yury Postrigay; Alexander Dyachenko; Russia	Nebojša Grujić; Marko Novaković; Serbia
2017 Račice	Balázs Birkás; Márk Balaska; Hungary	Cristian Toro; Carlos Garrote; Spain	Marko Novaković; Nebojša Grujić; Serbia
2018 Montemor-o-Velho	Balázs Birkás; Márk Balaska; Hungary	Cristian Toro; Saúl Craviotto; Spain	Marko Novaković; Nebojša Grujić; Serbia
2019 Szeged	Yury Postrigay; Alexander Dyachenko; Russia	Piotr Mazur; Bartosz Grabowski; Poland	Márk Balaska; Levente Apagyi; Hungary

== K-2 500 m ==
Debuted: 1948.

Games	Gold	Silver	Bronze
1948 London	Thor Axelsson; Nils Björklöf; Finland	Alfred Christensen; Finn Rasmussen; Denmark	Bernhard Jensen; Ejvind Hansen; Denmark
1950 Copenhagen	Lars Glassér; Ingemar Hedberg; Sweden	Henry Pettersson; Berndt Häppling; Sweden	Max Raub; Herbert Wiedermann; Austria
1954 Mâcon	Ernst Steinhauer; Meinrad Miltenberger; West Germany	Bengt Linfors; Valter Wredberg; Sweden	Ferenc Wagner; András Sován; Hungary
1958 Prague	Stefan Kapłaniak; Władysław Zieliński; Poland	László Nagy; László Kovács; Hungary	Meinrad Miltenberger; Paul Lange; West Germany
1963 Jajce	Vasilie Nicoară; Haralambie Ivanov; Romania	Aurel Vernescu; Mircea Anastasescu; Romania	Heinz Büker; Holger Zander; West Germany
1966 East Berlin	Aurel Vernescu; Atanase Sciotnic; Romania	Heinz Büker; Holger Zander; West Germany	Vladimir Obraztsov; Georgiy Karyukhin; Soviet Union
1970 Copenhagen	Lars Andersson; Rolf Peterson; Sweden	Aurel Vernescu; Atanase Sciotnic; Romania	Gerhard Seibold; Günther Pfaff; Austria
1971 Belgrade	Lars Andersson; Rolf Peterson; Sweden	Jean-Pierre Burny; Paul Hoekstra; Belgium	Nikolay Gogol; Pytor Greshta; Soviet Union
1973 Tampere	Nikolay Gogol; Pytor Greshta; Soviet Union	József Deme; János Rátkai; Hungary	Ion Dragulschi; Ernst Pavel; Romania
1974 Mexico City	Ryszard Oborski; Grzegorz Śledziewski; Poland	József Deme; János Rátkai; Hungary	Volkmar Thiede; Rüdiger Helm; East Germany
1975 Belgrade	Viktor Vorobiyev; Nikolay Astapkovich; Soviet Union	Herbert Laabs; Harald Marg; East Germany	Larion Serghei; Policarp Malîhin; Romania
1977 Sofia	Joachim Mattern; Bernd Olbricht; East Germany	Viktor Vorobiyev; Nikolay Astapkovich; Soviet Union	Géza Csapó; József Svidró; Hungary
1978 Belgrade	Bernd Olbricht; Rüdiger Helm; East Germany	Nicușor Eșanu; Ion Bîrlădeanu; Romania	Sergei Chukhray; Vladimir Tainikov; Soviet Union
1979 Duisburg	Vladimir Parfenovich; Sergei Chukhray; Soviet Union	Bernd Olbricht; Rüdiger Helm; East Germany	Alain Lebas; Francis Hervieu; France
1981 Nottingham	Vladimir Parfenovich; Sergey Superata; Soviet Union	Waldemar Merk; Daniel Wełna; Poland	Bernd Fleckeisen; Frank Fischer; East Germany
1982 Belgrade	Vladimir Parfenovich; Sergey Superata; Soviet Union	Alan Thompson; Paul MacDonald; New Zealand	Matthias Seack; Oliver Seack; West Germany
1983 Tampere	Frank Fischer; André Wohllebe; East Germany	Vladimir Parfenovich; Sergey Superata; Soviet Union	Hugh Fisher; Alwyn Morris; Canada
1985 Mechelen	Ian Ferguson; Paul MacDonald; New Zealand	Guido Behling; Hans-Jörg Bliesener; East Germany	Viktor Pusev; Sergey Superata; Soviet Union
1986 Montreal	Reiner Scholl; Thomas Pfrang; West Germany	András Rajna; Attila Adrovicz; Hungary	Viktor Pusev; Sergey Superata; Soviet Union
1987 Duisburg	Ferenc Csipes; László Fidel; Hungary	Ian Ferguson; Paul MacDonald; New Zealand	Per-Inge Bengtsson; Karl-Axel Sundqvist; Sweden
1989 Plovdiv	Kay Bluhm; Torsten Gutsche; East Germany	Sergey Kalesnik; Anatoly Tishchenko; Soviet Union	Maciej Freimut; Wojciech Kurpiewski; Poland
1990 Poznań	Sergey Kalesnik; Anatoly Tishchenko; Soviet Union	Mike Herbert; Terry Kent; United States	Kay Bluhm; Torsten Gutsche; East Germany
1991 Paris	Juan José Roman; Juan Manuel Sánchez; Spain	Kay Bluhm; Torsten Gutsche; Germany	Ferenc Csipes; Zsolt Gyulay; Hungary
1993 Copenhagen	Kay Bluhm; Torsten Gutsche; Germany	Maciej Freimut; Wojciech Kurpiewski; Poland	Juan Manuel Sánchez; Juan José Roman; Spain
1994 Mexico City	Kay Bluhm; Torsten Gutsche; Germany	András Rajna; Attila Adrovicz; Hungary	Martin Hunter; Clint Robinson; Australia
1995 Duisburg	Beniamino Bonomi; Daniele Scarpa; Italy	Zsolt Gyulay; Krisztián Bártfai; Hungary	Maciej Freimut; Adam Wysocki; Poland
1997 Dartmouth	Andrew Trim; Daniel Collins; Australia	Beniamino Bonomi; Luca Negri; Italy	Krisztián Bártfai; Gábor Horvárth; Hungary
1998 Szeged	Michal Riszdorfer; Juraj Bača; Slovakia	Beniamino Bonomi; Luca Negri; Italy	Krisztián Bártfai; Gábor Horvárth; Hungary
1999 Milan	Marek Twardowski; Adam Wysocki; Poland	Botond Storcz; Gábor Horvárth; Hungary	Daniel Collins; Andrew Trim; Australia
2001 Poznań	Ronald Rauhe; Tim Wieskötter; Germany	Alvydas Duonėla; Egidijus Balčiūnas; Lithuania	Markus Oscarsson; Henrik Nilsson; Sweden
2002 Seville	Ronald Rauhe; Tim Wieskötter; Germany	Adam Wysocki; Marek Twardowski; Poland	Zoltán Kammerer; Botond Storcz; Hungary
2003 Gainesville	Ronald Rauhe; Tim Wieskötter; Germany	Roman Petrushenko; Vadzim Makhneu; Belarus	Alvydas Duonėla; Egidijus Balčiūnas; Lithuania
2005 Zagreb	Ronald Rauhe; Tim Wieskötter; Germany	Marek Twardowski; Adam Wysocki; Poland	Alvydas Duonėla; Egidijus Balčiūnas; Lithuania
2006 Szeged	Ronald Rauhe; Tim Wieskötter; Germany	Richard Dessureault-Dober; Andrew Willows; Canada	Gábor Kucsera; Zoltán Kammerer; Hungary
2007 Duisburg	Ronald Rauhe; Tim Wieskötter; Germany	Raman Piatrushenka; Vadzim Makhneu; Belarus	Gábor Kucsera; Zoltán Kammerer; Hungary
2009 Dartmouth	Raman Piatrushenka; Vadzim Makhneu; Belarus	Gábor Kucsera; Zoltán Kammerer; Hungary	Hendrik Bertz; Marcus Gross; Germany
2010 Poznań	Raman Piatrushenka; Vadzim Makhneu; Belarus	Fernando Pimenta; João Ribeiro; Portugal	Duško Stanojević; Dejan Pajić; Serbia
2011 Szeged	Dávid Tóth; Tamás Kulifai; Hungary	Ričardas Nekriošius; Andrej Olijnik; Lithuania	Denis Ambroziak; Dawid Putto; Poland
2013 Duisburg	Emanuel Silva; João Ribeiro; Portugal	Raman Piatrushenka; Vadzim Makhneu; Belarus	Sébastien Jouve; Maxime Beaumont; France
2014 Moscow	Erik Vlček; Juraj Tarr; Slovakia	Rudolf Dombi; Gergely Boros; Hungary	Raman Piatrushenka; Vadzim Makhneu; Belarus
2015 Milan	Ken Wallace; Lachlan Tame; Australia	Marcus Walz; Diego Cosgaya; Spain	Dávid Hérics; Tamás Somorácz; Hungary
2017 Račice	Rodrigo Germade; Marcus Walz; Spain	Bence Nádas; Sándor Tótka; Hungary	Raman Piatrushenka; Vitaliy Bialko; Belarus
2018 Montemor-o-Velho	Artem Kuzakhmetov; Vladislav Blintsov; Russia	Stefan Vekić; Vladimir Torubarov; Serbia	Ričardas Nekriošius; Andrej Olijnik; Lithuania
2019 Szeged	Stanislau Daineka; Dzmitry Natynchyk; Belarus	Pelayo Roza; Pedro Vázquez; Spain	Marcus Gross; Martin Hiller; Germany
2021 Copenhagen	Marcus Walz; Rodrigo Germade; Spain	Tobias-Pascal Schultz; Martin Hiller; Germany	Samuel Baláž; Denis Myšák; Slovakia
2022 Dartmouth	Bence Nádas; Bálint Kopasz; Hungary	Mindaugas Maldonis; Andrejus Olijnikas; Lithuania	Jean van der Westhuyzen; Thomas Green; Australia
2023 Duisburg	João Ribeiro; Messias Baptista; Portugal	Bence Nádas; Bálint Kopasz; Hungary	Adrián del Río; Rodrigo Germade; Spain
2025 Milan	Levente Kurucz; Bence Nádas; Hungary	João Ribeiro; Messias Baptista; Portugal	Jacob Schopf; Max Lemke; Germany
2026 Poznán	Jacob Schopf; Max Lemke; Germany	João Ribeiro; Messias Baptista; Portugal	Jakub Špicar; Daniel Havel; Czech Republic

== K-2 1000 m ==
Debuted: 1938. Not held: 1948. Resumed: 1950.

Games	Gold	Silver	Bronze
1938 Vaxholm	Helmut Triebe; Hans Eberle; Germany	Kurt Boo; Hans Berglund; Sweden	Poul Larsen; Vagn Jørgensen; Denmark
1950 Copenhagen	Lars Glassér; Ingemar Hedberg; Sweden	Ivar Mathisen; Knut Østby; Norway	Piet Bakker; Harrie Koorstra; Netherlands
1954 Mâcon	István Mészáros; György Mészáros; Hungary	Michel Scheuer; Gustav Schmidt; West Germany	Helmut Noller; Günter Krammer; West Germany
1958 Prague	Henri Verbrugghe; Germain van der Moere; Belgium	Yevgeny Yatsinenko; Ivan Golovachov; Soviet Union	Mikhail Kaaleste; Anatoly Demitkov; Soviet Union
1963 Jajce	Vasilie Nicoară; Haralambie Ivanov; Romania	Wolfgang Lange; Dieter Krause; East Germany	Nikolay Zhushikov; Anatoli Grishin; Soviet Union
1966 East Berlin	Aleksandr Shaparenko; Yuriy Zhetchenko; Soviet Union	Aurel Vernescu; Atanase Sciotnic; Romania	Ferenc Cseh; Endre Hazsik; Hungary
1970 Copenhagen	Gerhard Seibold; Günther Pfaff; Austria	Lars Andersson; Rolf Peterson; Sweden	Klaus-Peter Ebeling; Joachim Mattern; East Germany
1971 Belgrade	Reiner Kurth; Alexander Slatnow; East Germany	Gerhard Seibold; Günther Pfaff; Austria	Costel Coșniță; Vasilie Simiocenco; Romania
1973 Tampere	József Deme; János Rátkai; Hungary	Ion Dragulschi; Ernst Pavel; Romania	Herbert Laabs; Joachim Mattern; East Germany
1974 Mexico City	Zoltán Bakó; István Szabó; Hungary	Vladimir Kozubin; Mikhail Afanasiyev; Soviet Union	Volkmar Thiede; Rüdiger Helm; East Germany
1975 Belgrade	Alexander Slatnow; Gerhard Rummel; East Germany	Larion Serghei; Policarp Malîhin; Romania	József Deme; János Rátkai; Hungary
1977 Sofia	Zoltán Bakó; István Szabó; Hungary	Bernd Olbricht; Joachim Mattern; East Germany	Vladimir Romanovsky; Sergei Nagornyi; Soviet Union
1978 Belgrade	Sergei Chukhray; Vladimir Tainikov; Soviet Union	Einar Rasmussen; Olaf Søyland; Norway	Zoltán Bakó; István Szabó; Hungary
1979 Duisburg	Einar Rasmussen; Olaf Søyland; Norway	Zoltán Bakó; István Szabó; Hungary	Sergei Chukhray; Vladimir Tainikov; Soviet Union
1981 Nottingham	Vladimir Parfenovich; Sergey Superata; Soviet Union	Bernd Fleckeisen; Frank Fischer; East Germany	Waldemar Merk; Daniel Wełna; Poland
1982 Belgrade	Vladimir Parfenovich; Sergey Superata; Soviet Union	Alwyn Morris; Hugh Fisher; Canada	Luis Gregorio Ramos; Herminio Rodriguez; Spain
1983 Tampere	Frank Fischer; André Wohllebe; East Germany	Vladimir Parfenovich; Sergey Superata; Soviet Union	Werner Bachmayer; Wolfgang Hartl; Austria
1985 Mechelen	Pascal Boucherit; Philippe Boccara; France	Viktor Pusev; Sergey Superata; Soviet Union	Don Brien; Colin Shaw; Canada
1986 Montreal	Daniel Stoian; Angelin Velea; Romania	André Wohllebe; Frank Fischer; East Germany	Kerry Grant; Steven Wood; Australia
1987 Duisburg	Ian Ferguson; Paul MacDonald; New Zealand	Philippe Boccara; Pascal Boucherit; France	Thomas Gähme; Thomas Vaske; East Germany
1989 Plovdiv	Kay Bluhm; Torsten Gutsche; East Germany	Vladimir Bobrezhov; Artūras Vieta; Soviet Union	Attila Adrovicz; Zoltán Berkes; Hungary
1990 Poznań	Kay Bluhm; Torsten Gutsche; East Germany	Vladimir Bobrezhov; Artūras Vieta; Soviet Union	Gábor Szabó; Béla Petrovics; Hungary
1991 Paris	Kay Bluhm; Torsten Gutsche; Germany	Juan José Roman; Juan Manuel Sánchez; Spain	Ákos Angyal; Béla Petrovics; Hungary
1993 Copenhagen	Kay Bluhm; Torsten Gutsche; Germany	Antonio Rossi; Daniele Scarpa; Italy	Kalle Sundqvist; Hans Olsson; Sweden
1994 Mexico City	Jesper Staal; Thor Nielsen; Denmark	Antonio Rossi; Daniele Scarpa; Italy	István Beé; István Szijarto; Hungary
1995 Duisburg	Antonio Rossi; Daniele Scarpa; Italy	Kay Bluhm; Torsten Gutsche; Germany	Grzegorz Kotowicz; Dariusz Białkowski; Poland
1997 Dartmouth	Antonio Rossi; Luca Negri; Italy	Jesper Staal; Thomas Holm Jakobsen; Denmark	Grzegorz Kotowicz; Dariusz Białkowski; Poland
1998 Szeged	Antonio Rossi; Luca Negri; Italy	Mićo Janić; Stjepan Janić; FR Yugoslavia	Attila Adám; Krisztián Veréb; Hungary
1999 Milan	Michal Riszdorfer; Juraj Bača; Slovakia	Marek Twardowski; Adam Wysocki; Poland	Jan Schäfer; Olaf Winter; Germany
2001 Poznań	Eirik Verås Larsen; Nils Fjeldheim; Norway	Krisztián Bártfai; Krisztián Veréb; Hungary	Marc Westphalen; Marco Herszel; Germany
2002 Seville	Markus Oscarsson; Henrik Nilsson; Sweden	Eirik Verås Larsen; Nils Fjeldheim; Norway	Ákos Vereckei; Krisztián Veréb; Hungary
2003 Gainesville	Markus Oscarsson; Henrik Nilsson; Sweden	Bob Maesen; Wouter D'Haene; Belgium	Tim Huth; Marco Herszel; Germany
2005 Zagreb	Roland Kökény; Gábor Kucsera; Hungary	Andreas Ihle; Marco Herszel; Germany	Mattis Næss; Jacob Norenberg; Norway
2006 Szeged	Gábor Kucsera; Zoltán Kammerer; Hungary	Rupert Wagner; Andreas Ihle; Germany	Tomasz Górski; Adam Seroczyński; Poland
2007 Duisburg	Philippe Colin; Cyrille Carré; France	Adam Seroczyński; Mariusz Kujawski; Poland	Gábor Kucsera; Zoltán Kammerer; Hungary
2009 Dartmouth	Emilio Merchán; Diego Cosgaya; Spain	David Smith; Luke Morrison; Australia	Reiner Torres; Carlos Montalvo; Cuba
2010 Poznań	Martin Hollstein; Andreas Ihle; Germany	Zoltán Kammerer; Ákos Vereckei; Hungary	Ilya Medvedev; Anton Ryakhov; Russia
2011 Szeged	Peter Gelle; Erik Vlček; Slovakia	Markus Oscarsson; Henrik Nilsson; Sweden	Vitaly Yurchenko; Vasily Pogrebn; Russia
2013 Duisburg	Max Rendschmidt; Marcus Gross; Germany	Pavel Miadzvedzeu; Aleh Yurenia; Belarus	Rudolf Dombi; Roland Kökény; Hungary
2014 Moscow	Erik Vlček; Juraj Tarr; Slovakia	Ken Wallace; Lachlan Tame; Australia	Marko Tomićević; Vladimir Torubarov; Serbia
2015 Milan	Max Rendschmidt; Marcus Gross; Germany	Ken Wallace; Lachlan Tame; Australia	Marko Tomićević; Milenko Zorić; Serbia
2017 Račice	Milenko Zorić; Marko Tomićević; Serbia	Peter Gelle; Adam Botek; Slovakia	Daniel Havel; Jakub Špicar; Czech Republic
2018 Montemor-o-Velho	Max Hoff; Marcus Gross; Germany	Francisco Cubelos; Íñigo Peña; Spain	Marko Tomićević; Milenko Zorić; Serbia
2019 Szeged	Max Hoff; Jacob Schopf; Germany	Francisco Cubelos; Íñigo Peña; Spain	Cyrille Carré; Étienne Hubert; France
2021 Copenhagen	Dennis Kernen; Martin Nathell; Sweden	Simon Jensen; Morten Graversen; Denmark	Bálint Noé; Tamás Kulifai; Hungary
2022 Dartmouth	Martin Hiller; Tamás Gecső; Germany	Samuele Burgo; Andrea Schera; Italy	Bálint Noé; Tamás Kulifai; Hungary
2023 Duisburg	Pedro Vázquez; Íñigo Peña; Spain	Bence Vajda; Tamás Szántói-Szabó; Hungary	Anton Winkelmann; Leonard Busch; Germany
2024 Samarkand	Mikita Borykau; Aleh Yurenia; AIN	Joakim Lindberg; Martin Nathell; Sweden	Felix Frank; Martin Hiller; Germany

== K-2 10000 m ==
Debuted: 1938. Not held: 1948. Resumed: 1950. Discontinued: 1993. Folding kayak only appeared in 1938.

Games	Gold	Silver	Bronze
1938 Vaxholm	Gunnar Johansson; Berndt Berndtsson; Sweden	Helmut Triebe; Hans Eberle; Germany	Adolf Kainz; Karl Maurer; Germany
1938 Vaxholm (folding)	Carl-Gustav Hellstrandt; Erik Helsvik; Sweden	Sven Johansson; Erik Bladström; Sweden	Kurt Kreh; Johann Fuchs; Germany
1950 Copenhagen	Gunnar Åkerlund; Hans Wetterström; Sweden	Svend Frømming; Ingvard Nørregaard; Denmark	Karl-Erick Björk; Per-Olav Olsson; Sweden
1954 Mâcon	Max Raub; Herbert Wiedermann; Austria	Sigvard Johansson; Rolf Fjellmann; Sweden	Ernst Steinhauer; Helmuth Stocker; West Germany
1958 Prague	János Urányi; László Fábián; Hungary	Heinz Ackers; Wilhelm Schlüssel; West Germany	Helmuth Stocker; Franz Teidl; West Germany
1963 Jajce	László Fábián; István Timár; Hungary	Tord Sahlén; Tyrone Ferm; Sweden	Erich Suhrbier; Siegfred Brzoska; West Germany
1966 East Berlin	Imre Szöllősi; László Fábián; Hungary	Egil Søby; Jan Johansen; Norway	Pavel Kvasil; František Švec; Czechoslovakia
1970 Copenhagen	Konstantin Kostenko; Vyacheslav Kononov; Soviet Union	Imre Szöllősi; Vilmos Nagy; Hungary	Costel Coșniță; Vasilie Simiocenco; Romania
1971 Belgrade	Konstantin Kostenko; Vyacheslav Kononov; Soviet Union	Egil Søby; Jan Johansen; Norway	Antrop Varabiev; Emilian Zabara; Romania
1973 Tampere	Zoltán Bakó; Géza Csapó; Hungary	Ion Terente; Antrop Varabiev; Romania	Jos Broekx; Paul Stinckens; Belgium
1974 Mexico City	Antrop Varabiev; Ion Terente; Romania	Jos Broekx; Paul Stinckens; Belgium	Konstantin Kostenko; Vyacheslav Kononov; Soviet Union
1975 Belgrade	Zoltán Bakó; István Szabó; Hungary	Danio Merli; Giorgio Sbruzzi; Italy	Valeriy Zhemeza; Petras Šiurskas; Soviet Union
1977 Sofia	Petras Šiurskas; Anatoliy Korolkov; Soviet Union	Zoltán Bakó; István Szabó; Hungary	Nicolae Țicu; Cuprian Macarencu; Romania
1978 Belgrade	Zoltán Bakó; István Szabó; Hungary	Alain Lebas; Jean-Paul Hanquier; France	Nicușor Eșanu; Grigore Constantin; Romania
1979 Duisburg	Nicușor Eșanu; Ion Bîrlădeanu; Romania	Nikolay Astapkovich; Viktor Bukanov; Soviet Union	Herminio Rodriguez; Luis Gregorio Ramos; Spain
1981 Nottingham	Nikolay Astapkovich; Vladimir Romanovsky; Soviet Union	István Szabó; István Joós; Hungary	Ion Bîrlădeanu; Nicușor Eșanu; Romania
1982 Belgrade	Bernard Brégeon; Patrick Lefoulon; France	Ron Stevens; Gert Jan Lebbink; Netherlands	István Szabó; István Tóth; Hungary
1983 Tampere	Stephen Jackson; Alan Williams; United Kingdom	István Szabó; István Tóth; Hungary	Bengt Andersson; Karl-Axel Sundqvist; Sweden
1985 Mechelen	Mikael Berger; Conny Edholm; Sweden	István Szabó; István Tóth; Hungary	Francesco Uberti; Daniele Scarpa; Italy
1986 Montreal	Gábor Kulcsár; László Gindl; Hungary	Sergey Korneyevez; Viktor Detkovskiy; Soviet Union	Daniel Stoian; Angelin Velea; Romania
1987 Duisburg	Philippe Boccara; Pascal Boucherit; France	Thor Nielsen; Lars Koch; Denmark	Ferenc Csipes; Sándor Hódosi; Hungary
1989 Plovdiv	Attila Ábrahám; Sándor Hódosi; Hungary	Grayson Bourne; Ivan Lawler; United Kingdom	Vladimir Gordilley; Gennadiy Vassilenko; Soviet Union
1990 Poznań	Grayson Bourne; Ivan Lawler; United Kingdom	Ian Ferguson; Paul MacDonald; New Zealand	Boris Danilov; Vladimir Mozeiko; Soviet Union
1991 Paris	Philippe Boccara; Pascal Boucherit; France	Kay Bluhm; Torsten Gutsche; Germany	Róbert Erban; Juraj Kadnár; Czechoslovakia
1993 Copenhagen	Zsolt Borhi; Attila Ábrahám; Hungary	Kalle Sundqvist; Hans Olsson; Sweden	Torgeir Toppe; Peter Ribe; Norway

== K-4 200 m ==
Debuted: 1994. Discontinued: 2009.

Games	Gold	Silver	Bronze
1994 Mexico City	Anatoly Tishchenko; Oleg Gorobiy; Sergey Verlin; Viktor Denisov; Russia	Florin Scoica; Sorin Petcu; Marin Popescu; Geza Magyar; Romania	Michał Śliwiński; Andrey Petrov; Yuriy Kichayev; Andrey Borzukov; Ukraine
1995 Duisburg	Krisztián Bártfai; Gyula Kajner; Antal Páger; Gábor Pankotai; Hungary	Anatoly Tishchenko; Oleg Gorobiy; Sergey Verlin; Viktor Denisov; Russia	Thomas Reineck; André Wohllebe; Jan Günther; Mark Zabel; Germany
1997 Dartmouth	Anatoly Tishchenko; Oleg Gorobiy; Sergey Verlin; Aleksandr Ivanik; Russia	Vince Fehérvári; Krisztián Bártfai; Gábor Horvarth; Róbert Hegedűs; Hungary	Torsten Gutsche; Mark Zabel; Jan Günther; Björn Bach; Germany
1998 Szeged	Gyula Kajner; Vince Fehérvári; István Beé; Róbert Hegedűs; Hungary	Antonio Rossi; Beniamino Bonomi; Ivano Lussignoli; Luca Negri; Italy	Andreas Gjersø; Nils Olav Fjeldheim; Knut Holmann; Robby Roarsen Hangli; Norway
1999 Milan	Vince Fehérvári; Gyula Kajner; István Beé; Róbert Hegedűs; Hungary	Piotr Markiewicz; Marek Twardowski; Adam Wysocki; Paweł Łakomy; Poland	Anatoly Tishchenko; Andrey Shchegolikhin; Oleg Gorobiy; Vitaly Gankin; Russia
2001 Poznań	Vince Fehérvári; Gyula Kajner; István Beé; Róbert Hegedűs; Hungary	Roman Zarubin; Aleksandr Ivanik; Denys Tourtchenkov; Andrey Tissin; Russia	Oleksiy Slivinskiy; Mykola Zaichenkov; Mykhaylo Luchnik; Boris Markin; Ukraine
2002 Seville	Martin Chorváth; Rastislav Kužel; Ladislav Belovič; Juraj Lipták; Slovakia	Manuel Muñoz; Jaime Acuña; Aike González; Oier Aizpurua; Spain	Vince Fehérvári; Róbert Hegedűs; Gábor Horváth; István Beé; Hungary
2003 Gainesville	Oleksiy Slivinskiy; Mykhaylo Luchnik; Mykola Zaichenkov; Andriy Borzukov; Ukraine	Vasile Curuzan; Marian Baban; Alexandru Ceaușu; Romică Șerban; Romania	Manuel Muñoz; Jaime Acuña; Aike González; Oier Aizpurua; Spain
2005 Zagreb	Viktor Kadler; István Beé; Balázs Babella; Gergely Gyertyános; Hungary	Norman Bröckl; Björn Bach; Björn Goldschmidt; Jonas Ems; Germany	Raman Piatrushenka; Aleksey Abalmasov; Dziamyan Turchyn; Vadzim Makhneu; Belarus
2006 Szeged	Milan Đenadić; Ognjen Filipović; Bora Sibinkić; Dragan Zorić; Serbia	Viktor Kadler; Gergely Gyertyános; Balázs Babella; István Beé; Hungary	Sergey Kosilov; Konstantin Vishnyakov; Stepan Shevchuk; Sergey Khovanskiy; Russia
2007 Duisburg	Viktor Kadler; István Beé; Gergely Boros; Balázs Babella; Hungary	Ognjen Filipović; Dragan Zorić; Bora Sibinkić; Milan Đenadić; Serbia	Stepan Shevchuk; Anton Vasilev; Konstantin Vishnyakov; Sergey Khovanskiy; Russia
2009 Dartmouth	Raman Piatrushenka; Taras Valko; Dziamyan Turchyn; Vadzim Makhneu; Belarus	Richard Riszdorfer; Michal Riszdorfer; Erik Vlček; Juraj Tarr; Slovakia	Alexander Dyachenko; Sergey Khovanskiy; Stepan Shevchuk; Roman Zarubin; Russia

== K-4 500 m ==
Debuted: 1977. Discontinued: 2007. Resumed: 2017.

Games	Gold	Silver	Bronze
1977 Sofia	Ryszard Oborski; Daniel Wełna; Grzegorz Kołtan; Henryk Budzicz; Poland	Ion Dragulschi; Beniami Borbandi; Policarp Malîhin; Vasilie Simiocenco; Romania	Herminio Menéndez; Martin Vázquez; José Ramón López; Luis Gregorio Ramos; Spain
1978 Belgrade	Peter Bischof; Bernd Duvigneau; Roland Graupner; Harald Marg; East Germany	Herminio Menéndez; José María Esteban; José Ramón López; Luis Gregorio Ramos; Spain	Ryszard Oborski; Daniel Wełna; Grzegorz Kołtan; Grzegorz Śledziewski; Poland
1979 Duisburg	Bernd Duvigneau; Harald Marg; Jürgen Dittrich; Roland Graupner; East Germany	Sergey Zhinkarenko; Ionas Sautra; Sergei Chukhray; Vladimir Tainikov; Soviet Union	Ryszard Oborski; Daniel Wełna; Grzegorz Kołtan; Grzegorz Śledziewski; Poland
1981 Nottingham	Igor Gaydamaka; Sergey Krivozheyev; Jüri Poljans; Aleksandr Vodovatov; Soviet Union	Jens Nordqvist; Lars-Erik Moberg; Per-Inge Bengtsson; Thomas Ohlsson; Sweden	Frank-Peter Bischof; André Wohllebe; Rüdiger Helm; Harald Marg; East Germany
1982 Belgrade	Sergey Krivozheyev; Igor Gaydamaka; Sergey Kolokolov; Aleksandr Vodovatov; Soviet Union	Frank-Peter Bischof; Frank Fischer; Rüdiger Helm; Harald Marg; East Germany	Jens Nordqvist; Lars-Erik Moberg; Per-Inge Bengtsson; Thomas Ohlsson; Sweden
1983 Tampere	Andreas Stähle; Peter Hempel; Harald Marg; Rüdiger Helm; East Germany	Sergey Kolokolov; Sergei Chukhray; Artūras Vieta; Aleksandr Vodovatov; Soviet Union	István Imai; Attila Császár; Zoltán Lorinczy; András Rajna; Hungary
1985 Mechelen	André Wohllebe; Frank Fischer; Peter Hempel; Heiko Zinke; East Germany	Aleksandr Belov; Igor Gaidamaka; Viktor Denisov; Aleksandr Vodovatov; Soviet Union	Karl-Axel Sundqvist; Per-Inge Bengtsson; Lars-Erik Moberg; Per Lundh; Sweden
1986 Montreal	Andreas Stähle; Frank Fischer; André Wohllebe; Jens Fiedler; East Germany	Aleksandr Motuzenko; Sergey Kirsanov; Nikolay Zhershen; Viktor Denisov; Soviet Union	Gilbert Schneider; Detlef Schmidt; Volker Kreutzer; Thomas Reineck; West Germany
1987 Duisburg	Aleksandr Motuzenko; Sergey Kirsanov; Artūras Vieta; Viktor Denisov; Soviet Union	Robert Chwiałkowski; Kazimierz Krzyżański; Grzegorz Krawców; Wojciech Kurpiewski; Poland	Reiner Scholl; Thomas Pfrang; Volker Kreutzer; Thomas Reineck; West Germany
1989 Plovdiv	Viktor Denisov; Sergey Kirsanov; Aleksandr Motuzenko; Viktor Pusev; Soviet Union	Volker Kreutzer; Thomas Pfrang; Reiner Scholl; Mario von Appen; West Germany	Andrian Dushev; Petar Godev; Nikolay Jordanov; Ivan Marinov; Bulgaria
1990 Poznań	Oleg Gorobiy; Sergey Kirsanov; Aleksandr Motuzenko; Viktor Pusev; Soviet Union	Matthias Hoppe; Uwe Münch; Andreas Stähle; André Wohllebe; East Germany	Attila Ábrahám; Ferenc Csipes; Gyula Kajner; Béla Petrovics; Hungary
1991 Paris	Detlef Hofmann; Oliver Kegel; Thomas Reineck; André Wohllebe; Germany	Attila Ábrahám; Attila Adám; Attila Adrovicz; László Fidel; Hungary	Sergey Gaikov; Oleg Gorobiy; Sergey Kirsanov; Andre Plitkin; Soviet Union
1993 Copenhagen	Viktor Denisov; Anatoliy Tischenko; Aleksandr Ivanik; Oleg Gorobiy; Russia	Thomas Reineck; Oliver Kegel; Mario van Appen; André Wohllebe; Germany	Zsolt Gyulay; Vince Fehérvári; Gábor Horváth; Attila Ábrahám; Hungary
1994 Mexico City	Viktor Denisov; Anatoly Tishchenko; Sergey Verlin; Oleg Gorobiy; Russia	Florin Scoica; Sorin Petcu; Marin Popescu; Geza Magyar; Romania	Gábor Horváth; Ferenc Csipes; Zoltán Antal; Róbert Hegedűs; Hungary
1995 Duisburg	Viktor Denisov; Anatoly Tishchenko; Sergey Verlin; Oleg Gorobiy; Russia	Detlef Hofmann; Thomas Reineck; Mario van Appen; Mark Zabel; Germany	Grzegorz Kotowicz; Marek Witkowski; Grzegorz Kaleta; Dariusz Białkowski; Poland
1997 Dartmouth	Zoltán Kammerer; Botond Storcz; Ákos Vereckei; Róbert Hegedűs; Hungary	Torsten Gutsche; Mark Zabel; Jan Günther; Björn Bach; Germany	Henrik Andersson; Nils-Erik Jonsson; Andreas Svensson; Henrik Nilsson; Sweden
1998 Szeged	Torsten Gutsche; Mark Zabel; Björn Bach; Stefan Ulm; Germany	Botond Storcz; Krisztián Bártfai; Zsolt Szádovszky; Márton Bauer; Hungary	Andrey Tissin; Andrey Shchegolikhin; Vitaliy Gankin; Roman Zarubin; Russia
1999 Milan	Torsten Gutsche; Mark Zabel; Björn Bach; Stefan Ulm; Germany	Andrey Tissin; Vitaliy Gankin; Aleksandr Ivanik; Roman Zarubin; Russia	Zoltán Kammerer; Botond Storcz; Ákos Vereckei; Gábor Horváth; Hungary
2001 Poznań	Roman Zarubin; Aleksandr Ivanik; Denys Tourtchenkov; Andrey Tissin; Russia	Vasile Curuzan; Marian Baban; Geza Magyar; Romică Șerban; Romania	Richard Riszdorfer; Michal Riszdorfer; Erik Vlček; Juraj Bača; Slovakia
2002 Seville	Richard Riszdorfer; Michal Riszdorfer; Erik Vlček; Juraj Bača; Slovakia	Roman Piatrushenko; Aleksey Skurkovskiy; Aleksey Abalmasov; Vadzim Makhneu; Belarus	Manuel Muñoz; Jaime Acuña; Aike González; Oier Aizpurua; Spain
2003 Gainesville	Richard Riszdorfer; Michal Riszdorfer; Erik Vlček; Juraj Bača; Slovakia	Vasile Curuzan; Marian Baban; Alexandru Ceaușu; Romică Șerban; Romania	Aleksandr Ivanik; Anatoly Tishchenko; Oleg Gorobiy; Vladimir Grushikhin; Russia
2005 Zagreb	Roman Piatrushenko; Aleksey Abalmasov; Dziamyan Turchyn; Vadzim Makhneu; Belarus	Michal Riszdorfer; Juraj Tarr; Andrej Wiebauer; Róbert Erban; Slovakia	Franco Benedini; Jaka Jazbec; Luca Piemonte; Antonio Scaduto; Italy
2006 Szeged	Richard Riszdorfer; Michal Riszdorfer; Róbert Erban; Erik Vlček; Slovakia	Attila Csamangó; Gábor Bozsik; Attila Boros; Márton Sik; Hungary	Adam Wysocki; Paweł Baumann; Przemysław Gawrych; Tomasz Mendelski; Poland
2007 Duisburg	Richard Riszdorfer; Michal Riszdorfer; Erik Vlček; Juraj Tarr; Slovakia	Stanislav Strelchanka; Dzianis Zhyhadia; Sergey Findziukevich; Ruslan Bichan; Belarus	Márton Sik; Attila Boros; Attila Csamangó; Gábor Bozsik; Hungary
2017 Račice	Tom Liebscher; Ronald Rauhe; Max Rendschmidt; Max Lemke; Germany	Rodrigo Germade; Cristian Toro; Carlos Garrote; Marcus Walz; Spain	Daniel Havel; Jan Štěrba; Jakub Špicar; Radek Šlouf; Czech Republic
2018 Montemor-o-Velho	Max Rendschmidt; Tom Liebscher; Ronald Rauhe; Max Lemke; Germany	Saúl Craviotto; Marcus Walz; Cristian Toro; Rodrigo Germade; Spain	Sándor Tótka; Péter Molnár; Miklós Dudás; István Kuli; Hungary
2019 Szeged	Max Rendschmidt; Tom Liebscher; Ronald Rauhe; Max Lemke; Germany	Saúl Craviotto; Carlos Arévalo; Rodrigo Germade; Marcus Walz; Spain	Erik Vlček; Adam Botek; Csaba Zalka; Samuel Baláž; Slovakia
2021 Copenhagen	Oleh Kukharyk; Dmytro Danylenko; Igor Trunov; Ivan Semykin; Ukraine	Samuel Baláž; Denis Myšák; Csaba Zalka; Adam Botek; Slovakia	Jakub Špicar; Daniel Havel; Jan Vorel; Radek Šlouf; Czech Republic
2022 Dartmouth	Saúl Craviotto; Carlos Arévalo; Marcus Cooper; Rodrigo Germade; Spain	Max Rendschmidt; Tom Liebscher; Jacob Schopf; Max Lemke; Germany	Oleh Kukharyk; Dmytro Danylenko; Ihor Trunov; Ivan Semykin; Ukraine
2023 Duisburg	Max Rendschmidt; Max Lemke; Jacob Schopf; Tom Liebscher; Germany	Bence Nádas; Kolos Csizmadia; István Kuli; Sándor Tótka; Hungary	Oleh Kukharyk; Dmytro Danylenko; Ihor Trunov; Ivan Semykin; Ukraine
2025 Milan	Gustavo Gonçalves; João Ribeiro; Messias Baptista; Pedro Casinha; Portugal	Márk Opavszky; Bence Fodor; Gergely Balogh; Zsombor Tamási; Hungary	Adrian del Rio; Alex Graneri; Carlos Arévalo; Rodrigo Germade; Spain
2026 Poznań	Max Rendschmidt; Max Lemke; Jacob Schopf; Tom Liebscher; Germany	Jean van der Westhuyzen; Pierre van der Westhuyzen; Riley Fitzsimmons; Noah Havard; Australia	Gustavo Gonçalves; João Ribeiro; Messias Baptista; Pedro Casinha; Portugal

== K-4 1000 m ==
Debuted: 1938. This is one of only two events held at every championships.

Games	Gold	Silver	Bronze
1938 Vaxholm	Ernst Kube; Heini Brüggemann; Ernst Strathmann; Heine Strathmann; Germany	Hans Rein; Josef Reidel; Albert Schorn; Karl Aulenbach; Germany	Roland Karlsson; Göte Carlsson; Gunnar Johansson; Berndt Berndtsson; Sweden
1948 London	Hans Berglund; Lennart Klingström; Gunnar Åkerlund; Hans Wetterström; Sweden	Herbert Klepp; Paul Felinger; Walter Piemann; Alfred Umgeher; Austria	Ludvík Klíma; Karel Lomecký; Ota Kroutil; Miloš Pech; Czechoslovakia
1950 Copenhagen	Einar Pihl; Hans Eriksson; Lars Pettersson; Berndt Häppling; Sweden	Gunnar Åkerlund; Ebbe Frick; Sven-Olov Sjödelius; Hans Wetterström; Sweden	Herbert Klepp; Walter Frühwirth; Hans Ortner; Paul Felinger; Austria
1954 Mâcon	Imre Vagyóczki; László Kovács; László Nagy; Zoltán Szigeti; Hungary	Einar Pihl; Ebbe Frick; Ragnar Heurlin; Stig Andersson; Sweden	Maurice Graffen; Marcel Renaud; Louis Gantois; Robert Enteric; France
1958 Prague	Michel Scheuer; Georg Lietz; Gustav Schmidt; Theodor Kleine; West Germany	György Mészáros; József Pehl; András Szente; János Petroczy; Hungary	Mikhail Kaaleste; Igor Pisarev; Anatoliy Trozhenkov; Anatoly Demitkov; Soviet Union
1963 Jajce	Günter Perleberg; Dieter Krause; Siegfried Rossberg; Wolfgang Lange; East Germany	Nicolae Artimov; Andrei Contolenco; Haralambie Ivanov; Vasilie Nicoară; Romania	Aleksandr Trifonov; Igor Safonov; Nikolay Konnikov; Vyacheslav Vinnik; Soviet Union
1966 East Berlin	Atanase Sciotnic; Mihai Țurcaș; Haralambie Ivanov; Anton Calenic; Romania	Günther Pfaff; Kurt Lindlgruber; Helmut Hediger; Gerhard Seibold; Austria	Aleksandr Shaparenko; Yuriy Zhetchenko; Vladimir Morozov; Georgiy Karyukhin; Soviet Union
1970 Copenhagen	Yuri Filatov; Valeri Didenko; Yuriy Zhetchenko; Vladimir Morozov; Soviet Union	Uwe Will; Eduard Augustin; Klaus-Peter Ebeling; Joachim Mattern; East Germany	István Szabó; Peter Várhelyi; Csaba Giczy; István Timár; Hungary
1971 Belgrade	Yuri Filatov; Vladimir Morozov; Yuriy Zhetchenko; Valeri Didenko; Soviet Union	Hans-Erich Pasch; Rainer Hennes; Rudolf Blass; Eberhard Fischer; West Germany	István Szabó; Peter Várhelyi; Zoltán Bakó; Géza Csapó; Hungary
1973 Tampere	József Deme; János Rátkai; Csongor Vargha; Csaba Giczy; Hungary	Yuri Filatov; Vladimir Morozov; Nikolay Gogol; Valeri Didenko; Soviet Union	Norbert Paschke; Peter Korsch; Jürgen Lehnert; Harald Marg; East Germany
1974 Mexico City	Herbert Laabs; Ulrich Hellige; Jürgen Lehnert; Bernd Duvigneau; East Germany	Yuri Filatov; Aleksandr Degtyarov; Aleksandr Kuprikov; Nikolay Astapkovich; Soviet Union	József Deme; János Rátkai; Csongor Vargha; Csaba Giczy; Hungary
1975 Belgrade	Herminio Rodriguez; José María Esteban; José Ramón López; Luis Gregorio Ramos; Spain	Herbert Laabs; Gerhard Rummel; Rüdiger Helm; Harald Marg; East Germany	István Szabó; Zoltán Bakó; József Deme; János Rátkai; Hungary
1977 Sofia	Ryszard Oborski; Daniel Wełna; Grzegorz Kołtan; Henryk Budzicz; Poland	Aleksandr Shaparenko; Vladimir Morozov; Sergey Nikolskiy; Aleksandr Avdeyev; Soviet Union	Herminio Rodriguez; José María Esteban; José Ramón López; Luis Gregorio Ramos; Spain
1978 Belgrade	Bernd Olbricht; Bernd Duvigneau; Rüdiger Helm; Harald Marg; East Germany	Nicușor Eșanu; Ion Bîrlădeanu; Mihai Zafiu; Alexandru Giura; Romania	Herminio Rodriguez; José María Esteban; José Ramón López; Luis Gregorio Ramos; Spain
1979 Duisburg	Bernd Duvigneau; Rüdiger Helm; Harald Marg; Bernd Olbricht; East Germany	Ryszard Oborski; Daniel Wełna; Grzegorz Kołtan; Grzegorz Śledziewski; Poland	Aleksandr Shaparenko; Sergei Nagornyi; Aleksandr Avdeyev; Ionas Sautra; Soviet Union
1981 Nottingham	Rüdiger Helm; Frank-Peter Bischof; Peter Hempel; Harald Marg; East Germany	Sergey Kolokolov; Aleksandr Volkovskiy; Aleksandr Yermilov; Nikolay Baranov; Soviet Union	Matthias Seack; Andreas Flunker; Frank Renner; Oliver Seack; West Germany
1982 Belgrade	Per-Inge Bengtsson; Lars-Erik Moberg; Thomas Ohlsson; Bengt Andersson; Sweden	Frank-Peter Bischof; Peter Hempel; Rüdiger Helm; Harald Marg; East Germany	Matthias Seack; Oliver Seack; Frank Renner; Bernd Hessel; West Germany
1983 Tampere	Ionel Constantin; Nicolae Feodosei; Ionel Letcae; Angelin Velea; Romania	Andreas Stähle; Peter Hempel; Rüdiger Helm; Harald Marg; East Germany	Sergey Kolokolov; Sergei Chukhray; Artūras Vieta; Aleksandr Vodovatov; Soviet Union
1985 Mechelen	Per-Inge Bengtsson; Lars-Erik Moberg; Karl-Axel Sundqvist; Bengt Andersson; Sweden	Aleksandr Myzgin; Igor Gaidamaka; Artūras Vieta; Aleksandr Vodovatov; Soviet Union	André Wohllebe; Frank Fischer; Peter Hempel; Heiko Zinke; East Germany
1986 Montreal	Ferenc Csipes; Zsolt Gyulay; László Fidel; Zoltán Kovács; Hungary	Guido Behling; Hans-Jörg Bliesener; Jens Fiedler; Thomas Vaske; East Germany	Robert Chwiałkowski; Kazimierz Krzyżański; Grzegorz Krawców; Wojciech Kurpiewski; Poland
1987 Duisburg	Zsolt Gyulay; Ferenc Csipes; László Fidel; Zoltán Kovács; Hungary	Per-Inge Bengtsson; Lars-Erik Moberg; Karl-Axel Sundqvist; Bengt Andersson; Sweden	Aleksandr Motuzenko; Sergey Kirsanov; Artūras Vieta; Viktor Denisov; Soviet Union
1989 Plovdiv	Ferenc Csipes; Attila Ábrahám; Zsolt Gyulay; Sándor Hódosi; Hungary	Robert Chwiałkowski; Maciej Freimut; Grzegorz Krawców; Wojciech Kurpiewski; Poland	Guido Behling; Torsten Krentz; Thomas Vaske; André Wohllebe; East Germany
1990 Poznań	Attila Ábrahám; Ferenc Csipes; László Fidel; Zsolt Gyulay; Hungary	Sergey Kalesnik; Sergey Kirsanov; Aleksandr Motuzenko; Anatoly Tishchenko; Soviet Union	Kay Bluhm; Torsten Gutsche; Torsten Krentz; André Wohllebe; East Germany
1991 Paris	Attila Ábrahám; Ferenc Csipes; László Fidel; Zsolt Gyulay; Hungary	Detlef Hofmann; Oliver Kegel; Thomas Reineck; André Wohllebe; Germany	Karol Becker; Richard Botio; Karel Hrudik; Michael Matus; Czechoslovakia
1993 Copenhagen	Thomas Reineck; Oliver Kegel; André Wohllebe; Mario van Appen; Germany	Zsolt Gyulay; Zsolt Borhi; Gábor Horváth; Attila Ábrahám; Hungary	Viktor Denisov; Anatoly Tishchenko; Aleksandr Ivanik; Oleg Gorobiy; Russia
1994 Mexico City	Viktor Denisov; Anatoly Tishchenko; Aleksandr Ivanik; Oleg Gorobiy; Russia	Piotr Markiewicz; Grzegorz Kotowicz; Adam Wysocki; Marek Witkowski; Poland	Thomas Reineck; Oliver Kegel; André Wohllebe; Mario van Appen; Germany
1995 Duisburg	Detlef Hofmann; Rene Pflugmacher; Thomas Reineck; Mark Zabel; Germany	Zsolt Gyulay; Attila Ábrahám; Krisztián Bártfai; Gábor Szabó; Hungary	Grzegorz Kotowicz; Marek Witkowski; Grzegorz Kaleta; Dariusz Białkowski; Poland
1997 Dartmouth	Torsten Gutsche; Mark Zabel; Björn Bach; Stefan Ulm; Germany	Botond Storcz; Zoltán Antal; Gábor Szabó; Márton Bauer; Hungary	Ross Chaffer; Brian Marton; Peter Scott; Adam Dean; Australia
1998 Szeged	Torsten Gutsche; Mark Zabel; Björn Bach; Stefan Ulm; Germany	Botond Storcz; Krisztián Bártfai; Zsolt Szádovszky; Márton Bauer; Hungary	Anatoly Tishchenko; Sergey Verlin; Georgiy Tsybulnikov; Aleksandr Ivanik; Russia
1999 Milan	Zoltán Kammerer; Botond Storcz; Ákos Vereckei; Gábor Horváth; Hungary	Torsten Gutsche; Mark Zabel; Björn Bach; Stefan Ulm; Germany	Sorin Petcu; Vasile Curuzan; Marian Sîrbu; Romică Șerban; Romania
2001 Poznań	Andreas Ihle; Mark Zabel; Björn Bach; Stefan Ulm; Germany	Zoltán Kammerer; Botond Storcz; Roland Kökény; Gábor Horváth; Hungary	Roman Zarubin; Aleksandr Ivanik; Denys Tourtchenkov; Oleg Gorobiy; Russia
2002 Seville	Richard Riszdorfer; Michal Riszdorfer; Erik Vlček; Juraj Bača; Slovakia	Mark Zabel; Björn Bach; Stefan Ulm; Andreas Ihle; Germany	Petar Merkov; Milko Kasanov; Ivan Hristov; Yordan Yordanov; Bulgaria
2003 Gainesville	Richard Riszdorfer; Michal Riszdorfer; Erik Vlček; Juraj Bača; Slovakia	Zoltán Kammerer; Ákos Vereckei; Roland Kökény; Krisztián Veréb; Hungary	Andreas Ihle; Mark Zabel; Björn Bach; Stefan Ulm; Germany
2005 Zagreb	Lutz Altepost; Norman Bröckl; Björn Bach; Arnd Goldschmidt; Germany	Michal Riszdorfer; Richard Riszdorfer; Erik Vlček; Róbert Erban; Slovakia	Paweł Baumann; Marek Twardowski; Adam Wysocki; Przemysław Gawrych; Poland
2006 Szeged	Ákos Vereckei; Roland Kökény; Lajos Gyökös; Gábor Horváth; Hungary	Marek Twardowski; Tomasz Mendelski; Paweł Baumann; Adam Wysocki; Poland	Vadzim Makhneu; Dziamyan Turhyn; Aleksey Abalmasov; Raman Piatrushenka; Belarus
2007 Duisburg	Lutz Altepost; Norman Bröckl; Marco Herszel; Björn Goldschmidt; Germany	Marek Twardowski; Tomasz Mendelski; Paweł Baumann; Adam Wysocki; Poland	Richard Riszdorfer; Michal Riszdorfer; Erik Vlček; Juraj Tarr; Slovakia
2009 Dartmouth	Aleksey Abalmasov; Artur Litvinchuk; Vadzim Makhneu; Raman Piatrushenka; Belarus	Guillaume Burger; Vincent Lecrubier; Philippe Colin; Sébastien Jouve; France	Richard Riszdorfer; Michal Riszdorfer; Erik Vlček; Juraj Tarr; Slovakia
2010 Poznań	Arnaud Hybois; Étienne Hubert; Sébastien Jouve; Philippe Colin; France	Raman Piatrushenka; Aliaksei Abalmasau; Artur Litvinchuk; Vadzim Makhneu; Belarus	Ondřej Horský; Jan Souček; Daniel Havel; Jan Štěrba; Czech Republic
2011 Szeged	Norman Bröckl; Robert Gleinert; Max Hoff; Paul Mittelstedt; Germany	Jacob Clear; Murray Stewart; David Smith; Tate Smith; Australia	Ilya Medvedev; Anton Vasilev; Anton Ryakhov; Oleg Zhestkov; Russia
2013 Duisburg	Vitaly Yurchenko; Vasily Pogreban; Anton Vasilev; Oleg Zhestkov; Russia	Daniel Havel; Lukáš Trefil; Josef Dostál; Jan Štěrba; Czech Republic	Tate Smith; David Smith; Murray Stewart; Jacob Clear; Australia
2014 Moscow	Daniel Havel; Lukáš Trefil; Josef Dostál; Jan Štěrba; Czech Republic	Fernando Pimenta; João Ribeiro; Emanuel Silva; David Fernandes; Portugal	Zoltán Kammerer; Dávid Tóth; Tamás Kulifai; Dániel Pauman; Hungary
2015 Milan	Denis Myšák; Erik Vlček; Juraj Tarr; Tibor Linka; Slovakia	Zoltán Kammerer; Dávid Tóth; Tamás Kulifai; Dániel Pauman; Hungary	Daniel Havel; Lukáš Trefil; Josef Dostál; Jan Štěrba; Czech Republic
2017 Račice	Kenny Wallace; Jordan Wood; Riley Fitzsimmons; Murray Stewart; Australia	Zoltán Kammerer; Daniel Pauman; Dávid Tóth; Benjámin Ceiner; Hungary	Kai Spenner; Lukas Reuschenbach; Kostja Stroinski; Tamas Gecsö; Germany
2018 Montemor-o-Velho	Tamas Gecsö; Jakob Thordsen; Jacob Schopf; Lukas Reuschenbach; Germany	Samuel Baláž; Juraj Tarr; Erik Vlček; Gábor Jakubík; Slovakia	Francisco Cubelos; Rubén Millán; Pelayo Roza; Íñigo Peña; Spain
2019 Szeged	Lukas Reuschenbach; Felix Frank; Jakob Thordsen; Tobias-Pascal Schultz; Germany	Vasily Pogreban; Aleksei Vostrikov; Oleg Siniavin; Igor Kalashnikov; Russia	Gábor Jakubík; Juraj Tarr; Denis Myšák; Ákos Gacsal; Slovakia

== K-4 10000 m ==
Debuted: 1950. Discontinued: 1993.

Games	Gold	Silver	Bronze
1950 Copenhagen	Karl Andersson; Stig Andersson; Gösta Gustavsson; Harry Johansson; Sweden	Karl-Erick Björk; Per-Olav Olsson; Klas Norgren; Arne Jansson; Sweden	Walter Piemann; Alfred Schmidtberger; Otto Lochner; Alfred Krammer; Austria
1954 Mâcon	Einar Pihl; Ebbe Frick; Ragnar Heurlin; Stig Andersson; Sweden	Hans Wetterström; Carl Sundin; Sigvard Johansson; Rolf Fjellmann; Sweden	János Urányi; István Mészáros; György Mészáros; Ferenc Varga; Hungary
1958 Prague	Michel Scheuer; Georg Lietz; Gustav Schmidt; Theodor Kleine; West Germany	Günter Kruger; Walter Sander; Heinrich Hell; Hubert Birgels; West Germany	Nikolay Rudzinkas; Volodya Tsevtskin; Alfons Rudzinkas; Vasiliy Stepanov; Soviet Union
1963 Jajce	István Timár; László Fábián; Otto Koltai; László Ürögi; Hungary	Günter Holzvoigt; Wolfgang Finger; Wolfgang Niedrig; Siegwart Karbe; East Germany	György Czink; János Petroczy; Gábor Almasi; Sámuel Egri; Hungary
1966 East Berlin	Nikolay Zhuzhikov; Anatoli Grishin; Vladimir Morozov; Vyacheslav Ionov; Soviet Union	Imre Szöllősi; László Fábián; János Petroczy; László Ürögi; Hungary	Wolfgang Lange; Günter Holzvoigt; Wolfgang Niedrig; Siegwart Karbe; East Germany
1970 Copenhagen	Egil Søby; Steinar Amundsen; Tore Berger; Jan Johansen; Norway	Horst Mattern; Rainer Hennes; Jochen Schneider; Erich Kemnitz; West Germany	Kurt Lycjner; Willy Tesch; Åke Sandin; Hans Nilsson; Sweden
1971 Belgrade	Cuprian Macarencu; Costel Coșniță; Vasilie Simiocenco; Atanase Sciotnic; Romania	Csaba Giczy; István Timár; György Mészáros; Csongor Vargha; Hungary	Heino Kurvet; Nikolai Gorbachev; Vladimir Klimov; Vladimir Semiyakov; Soviet Union
1973 Tampere	Csaba Giczy; Tibor Nagy; Csongor Vargha; Géza Kralován; Hungary	Hans-Erich Pasch; Horst Mattern; Rudolf Blass; Eberhard Fischer; West Germany	Atanase Sciotnic; Cuprian Macarencu; Costel Coșniță; Vasilie Simiocenco; Romania
1974 Mexico City	Leonid Derevyanko; Nikolai Gorbachev; Pytor Zhurga; Anatoliy Zharikin; Soviet Union	Csaba Giczy; Csongor Vargha; István Szabó; Zoltán Romhanyi; Hungary	Ryszard Oborski; Kazimierz Górecki; Grzegorz Kołtan; Andrzej Matysiak; Poland
1975 Belgrade	Einar Rasmussen; Steinar Amundsen; Andreas Orheim; Olaf Søyland; Norway	Costel Coșniță; Cuprian Macarencu; Vasilie Simiocenco; Nicușor Eșanu; Romania	Leonid Derevyanko; Nikolai Gorbachev; Pytor Zhurga; Anatoliy Zharikin; Soviet Union
1977 Sofia	Aleksandr Shaparenko; Vladimir Morozov; Sergey Nikolskiy; Aleksandr Avdeyev; Soviet Union	Csaba Giczy; János Rátkai; István Joós; Iván Herczeg; Hungary	Andrzej Klimaszewski; Krzysztof Lepianka; Zbigniew Torzecki; Zdzisław Szubski; Poland
1978 Belgrade	Aleksandr Shaparenko; Sergey Nikolskiy; Vladimir Morozov; Aleksandr Avdeyev; Soviet Union	Andrzej Klimaszewski; Krzysztof Lepianka; Zbigniew Torzecki; Zdzisław Szubski; Poland	Cuprian Macarencu; Ciobann Marian; Stefan Popa; Nicolae Țicu; Romania
1979 Duisburg	Aleksandr Shaparenko; Sergey Nikolskiy; Vladimir Morozov; Aleksandr Avdeyev; Soviet Union	Andrzej Klimaszewski; Krzysztof Lepianka; Zbigniew Torzecki; Zdzisław Szubski; Poland	Tamás Benkő; Péter Konecsny; László Szabó; Zoltán Romhanyi; Hungary
1981 Nottingham	Aleksandr Yermilov; Nikolay Baranov; Sergey Kolokolov; Vasiliy Silenkov; Soviet Union	Leszek Jamroziński; Andrzej Klimaszewski; Ryszard Oborski; Zdzisław Szubski; Poland	Stephen Brown; Christopher Canham; Stephen Jackson; Alan Williams; United Kingdom
1982 Belgrade	Aleksandr Yermilov; Nikolay Baranov; Sergei Chukhray; Vladimir Romanovsky; Soviet Union	Petrica Dimofte; Florian Marinescu; Ionel Igorov; Anghei Coman; Romania	Kálmán Petrikovics; Tamás Szekes; László Rasztotzky; Tibor Helyi; Hungary
1983 Tampere	Nikolay Astapkovich; Aleksandr Avdeyev; Nikolay Baranov; Aleksandr Yermilov; Soviet Union	Harald Amundsen; Geir Kvillum; Lars Ivar Gran; Arne Sletsjøe; Norway	Ireneusz Ciurzyński; Andrzej Klimaszewski; Ryszard Oborski; Krzysztof Szczepański; Poland
1985 Mechelen	Zoltán Böjti; Tibor Helyi; Zoltán Kovács; Kálmán Petrovics; Hungary	Tommy Karls; Bengt Andersson; Peter Ekström; Torbjörn Thoresson; Sweden	Brian Kragh; Thor Nielsen; Lars Koch; Henrik Christiansen; Denmark
1986 Montreal	Nikolay Oselez; Grigory Medvedev; Sergey Kislev; Aleksandr Akunichikov; Soviet Union	Ionel Constantin; Nicolae Feodosei; Ionel Letcae; Alexandru Dulău; Romania	Zoltán Böjti; Tibor Helyi; László Nieberl; Kálmán Petrovics; Hungary
1987 Duisburg	Harald Amundsen; Arne Sletsjøe; Morten Ivarsen; Arne Johan Almeland; Norway	Zoltán Berkes; Zoltán Böjti; Tibor Helyi; Kálmán Petrovics; Hungary	Gilbert Schneider; Oliver Kegel; Carsten Lömker; Thomas Reineck; West Germany
1989 Plovdiv	Vladimir Bobreshov; Aleksandr Myzgin; Sergey Superata; Artūras Vieta; Soviet Union	Gábor Kulcsár; Ákos Angyal; Ferenc Csipes; László Vincze; Hungary	Andrzej Gajewski; Tomasz Franaszek; Grzegorz Kaleta; Mariusz Rutkowski; Poland
1990 Poznań	Dmitry Bankovsky; Vladimir Bobreshov; Aleksandr Myzgin; Artūras Vieta; Soviet Union	Andrzej Gajewski; Andrzej Gryczko; Grzegorz Kaleta; Mariusz Rutkowski; Poland	Gunar Olsson; Hans Olsson; Peter Orban; Kalle Sundqvist; Sweden
1991 Paris	Detlef Hofmann; Oliver Kegel; Thomas Reineck; André Wohllebe; Germany	Ramon Andersson; Clint Robinson; Ian Rowling; Steven Wood; Australia	Jonas Fager; Pablo Grate; Hans Olsson; Peter Orban; Sweden
1993 Copenhagen	Thomas Reineck; Oliver Kegel; André Wohllebe; Mario van Appen; Germany	Andrzej Gryczko; Piotr Markiewicz; Maciej Freimut; Grzegorz Kaleta; Poland	Sergey Verlin; Vladimir Bobreshov; Sergey Tsibuinikov; Sergey Gaikov; Russia

== Relay K-1 4 × 200 m ==
Debuted: 2009. Discontinued in 2014.

Games	Gold	Silver	Bronze
2009 Dartmouth	Francisco Llera; Saúl Craviotto; Carlos Pérez; Ekaitz Saies; Spain	Norman Bröckl; Jonas Ems; Torsten Lubisch; Ronald Rauhe; Germany	Guillaume Burger; Arnaud Hybois; Sébastien Jouve; Jean Baptiste Lutz; France
2010 Poznań	Saúl Craviotto; Francisco Llera; Pablo Andrés; Carlos Pérez; Spain	Ed McKeever; Jonathon Schofield; Liam Heath; Edward Cox; United Kingdom	Viktor Zavolskiy; Alexander Dyachenko; Yevgeny Salakhov; Alexander Nikolaev; Russia
2011 Szeged	Saúl Craviotto; Ekaitz Saies; Carlos Pérez Rial; Pablo Andrés; Spain	Viktor Zavolskiy; Alexander Dyachenko; Mikhail Tamonov; Evgeny Salakhov; Russia	Casper Nielsen; Jimmy Bøjesen; Kasper Bleibach; Lasse Nielsen; Denmark
2013 Duisburg	Piotr Siemionowski; Denis Ambroziak; Sebastian Szypula; Dawid Putto; Poland	Yury Postrigay; Maxim Molochkov; Oleg Kharitonov; Alexander Dyachenko; Russia	Miklós Dudás; Sándor Tótka; Péter Molnár; Dávid Hérics; Hungary
2014 Moscow	Miklós Dudás; Dávid Hérics; Bence Nádas; Sándor Tótka; Hungary	Maxime Beaumont; Étienne Hubert; Arnaud Hybois; Sébastien Jouve; France	Liam Heath; Ed McKeever; Kristian Reeves; Jon Schofield; Great Britain

== Relay K-1 4 x 500 m ==
Debuted: 1948. Discontinued: 1975.

Games	Gold	Silver	Bronze
1948 London	Lars Glassér; Lars Helsvik; Lennart Klingström; Gert Fredriksson; Sweden	Ivar Mathisen; Ivar Iversen; Hans Gulbrandsen; Eivind Skabo; Norway	Bernhard Jensen; Poul Agger; Ejvind Hansen; Johan Kobberup; Denmark
1950 Copenhagen	Lars Glassér; Ingemar Hedberg; Lennart Klingström; Gert Fredriksson; Sweden	Poul Agger; Andreas Lind; Ejvind Hansen; Johan Kobberup; Denmark	Herbert Klepp; Max Raub; Herbert Wiedermann; Günther Rührnschopf; Austria
1954 Mâcon	Lars Glassér; Carl-Åke Ljung; Bert Nilsson; Gert Fredriksson; Sweden	Ervin Szörenyi; András Sován; Ferenc Wagner; Ferenc Hatlaczky; Hungary	Max Raub; Herbert Wiedermann; Alfred Schmidtberger; Hermann Salzner; Austria
1958 Prague	Paul Lange; Meinrad Miltenberger; Helmut Herz; Fritz Briel; West Germany	György Mészáros; László Kovács; Ferenc Hatlaczky; Lajos Kiss; Hungary	Henri Lindelöf; Carl von Gerber; Sven-Olov Sjödelius; Gert Fredriksson; Sweden
1963 Jajce	Aurel Vernescu; Vasilie Nicoară; Haralambie Ivanov; Anton Ivanescu; Romania	Vladimir Morozov; Vladimir Natalukha; Vyacheslav Vinnik; Ivan Gasonov; Soviet Union	Wolfgang Lange; Dieter Krause; Siegfried Rossberg; Günter Perleberg; East Germany
1966 East Berlin	Georgiy Karyukhin; Yuriy Kabanov; Vilnis Baltiņš; Dmitry Matveyev; Soviet Union	Mihály Hesz; András Szente; Ferenc Cseh; Imre Kemecsey; Hungary	Vasilie Nicoară; Haralambie Ivanov; Atanase Sciotnic; Aurel Vernescu; Romania
1970 Copenhagen	Nikolay Gogol; Anatoliy Tischenko; Anatoliy Kobrisev; Anatoliy Sedasov; Soviet Union	Eugen Botez; Mihai Zafiu; Ion Jacob; Aurel Vernescu; Romania	Géza Csapó; István Csizmadia; Mihály Hesz; József Svidró; Hungary
1971 Belgrade	Géza Csapó; István Szabó; Csaba Giczy; Mihály Hesz; Hungary	Dimitrie Ivanov; Mihai Zafiu; Eugen Botez; Aurel Vernescu; Romania	Anatoliy Kobrisev; Anatoliy Sedasov; Leonid Derevyanko; Anatoliy Tischenko; Soviet Union
1973 Tampere	Vitaliy Trukshin; Anatoliy Kobrisev; Sergey Nikolskiy; Oleg Zhegoyev; Soviet Union	István Csizmadia; Zoltán Angyal; Róbert Schaffhauser; Géza Csapó; Hungary	Atanase Sciotnic; Vasilie Simiocenco; Roman Vartolomeu; Mihai Zafiu; Romania
1974 Mexico City	Vasile Dîba; Ernst Pavel; Atanase Sciotnic; Mihai Zafiu; Romania	Vitaliy Trukshin; Sergei Chukhray; Anatoliy Kobrisev; Nikolay Astapkovich; Soviet Union	Ryszard Oborski; Grzegorz Śledziewski; Kazimierz Górecki; Andrzej Matysiak; Poland
1975 Belgrade	Iván Herczeg; József Svidró; Zoltán Sztanity; Péter Várhelyi; Hungary	Zoltfab Eseanu; Mihai Zafiu; Ion Dragulschi; Vasile Dîba; Romania	Herminio Menéndez; José Ramón López; Luis Gregorio Ramos; Martin Vázquez; Spain

== Mix K-2 200 m ==
Debuted: 2021

Games	Gold	Silver	Bronze
2021 Copenhagen	Anna Lucz; Kolos Csizmadia; Hungary	Messias Baptista; Francisca Laia; Portugal	Marta Walczykiewicz; Bartosz Grabowski; Poland

== Mix K-2 500 m ==
Debuted: 2021

Games	Gold	Silver	Bronze
2022 Dartmouth	Alyssa Bull; Jackson Collins; Australia	Teresa Portela; Fernando Pimenta; Portugal	Tobias Schultz; Caroline Arft; Germany
2023 Duisburg	Lena Röhlings; Jacob Schopf; Germany	Alyssa Bull; Jackson Collins; Australia	Bárbara Pardo; Íñigo Peña; Spain
2024 Samarkand	Teresa Portela; Messias Baptista; Portugal	Volha Khudzenka; Dzmitry Natynchyk; AIN	Josef Dostál; Anežka Paloudová; Czech Republic

== Mix K-4 500 m ==
Debuted: 2024

Games	Gold	Silver	Bronze
2024 Samarkand	Nadzeya Kushner; Volha Khudzenka; Uladzislau Kravets; Dzmitry Natynchyk; AIN	Laura Ujfalvi; Emese Kőhalmi; Márk Opavszky; Gergely Balogh; Hungary	Teresa Portela; Fernando Pimenta; Messias Baptista; Francisca Laia; Portugal
