= Vaske =

Vaske is a surname. Notable people with the surname include:

- Dennis Vaske (born 1967), American ice hockey player
- Kim Marie Vaske (born 2005), German para-athlete
- Thomas Vaske, German sprint canoeist
