= Varabiev =

Varabiev is a surname. Notable people with the surname include:

- Antrop Varabiev, Romanian sprint canoeist
- Lipat Varabiev (born 1951), Romanian sprint canoeist
