= Macarencu =

Macarencu is a Romanian surname. Notable people with the surname include:

- Aurel Macarencu (born 1963), Romanian sprint canoer
- Cuprian Macarencu, Romanian sprint canoer
