= Graupner =

Graupner may refer to:

- Adolphus E. Graupner (1875-1947), judge of the United States Board of Tax Appeals
- Christoph Graupner (1683-1760), German harpsichordist and composer
- Johann Christian Gottlieb Graupner (1767-1836), German musician, composer, educator and publisher
- Roland Graupner, German sprint canoer
- Graupner (company), a German manufacturer of radio controlled models and equipment.
