= Aike González =

Spanish canoeist

Medal record

Men's canoe sprint

World Championships
Silver medal – second place	2002 Seville	K-4 200 m
Bronze medal – third place	2002 Seville	K-4 500 m
Bronze medal – third place	2003 Gainesville	K-4 200 m

Aike González is a Spanish sprint canoer who competed in the early first decade of the 21st century. He won three medals at the ICF Canoe Sprint World Championships with a silver (K-4 200 m: 2002) and two bronzes (K-4 200 m: 2003, K-4 500 m: 2002).
