= Vladimir Tainikov =

Medal record

Men's canoe sprint

World Championships
Gold medal – first place	1978 Belgrade	K-2 1000 m
Silver medal – second place	1979 Duisburg	K-4 500 m
Bronze medal – third place	1978 Belgrade	K-2 500 m
Bronze medal – third place	1979 Duisburg	K-2 1000 m

Vladimir Tainikov, Uladzimir Taynikaw (Belarusian: Уладзімір Іванавіч Тайнікаў; born June 23, 1959) is a Soviet sprint canoer who competed in the late 1970s and early 1980s. He won four medals at the ICF Canoe Sprint World Championships with a gold (K-2 1000 m: 1978), a silver (K-4 500 m: 1979), and two bronzes (K-2 500 m: 1978, K-2 1000 m: 1979).

Trainikov also finished seventh in the K-4 1000 m event at the 1980 Summer Olympics in Moscow.
