= Bengt Andersson (canoeist) =

Swedish sprint canoer (born 1961)

Medal record

Men's canoe sprint

Representing Sweden

World Championships
Gold medal – first place	1982 Belgrade	K-4 1000 m
Gold medal – first place	1985 Mechelen	K-4 1000 m
Silver medal – second place	1985 Mechelen	K-4 10000 m
Silver medal – second place	1987 Duisburg	K-4 1000 m
Bronze medal – third place	1983 Tampere	K-2 10000 m

Bengt Andersson (born 6 November 1961) is a Swedish sprint canoer who competed in the 1980s. He won five medals at the ICF Canoe Sprint World Championships with two golds (K-4 1000 m: 1982, 1985), two silvers (K-4 1000 m: 1987, K-4 10000 m: 1985), and a bronze (K-2 10000 m: 1983).

Andersson also competed in two Summer Olympics, earning his best finish of eighth twice (K-2 1000 m: 1984, K-4 1000 m: 1988).
