= József Svidró =

Hungarian sprint canoeist

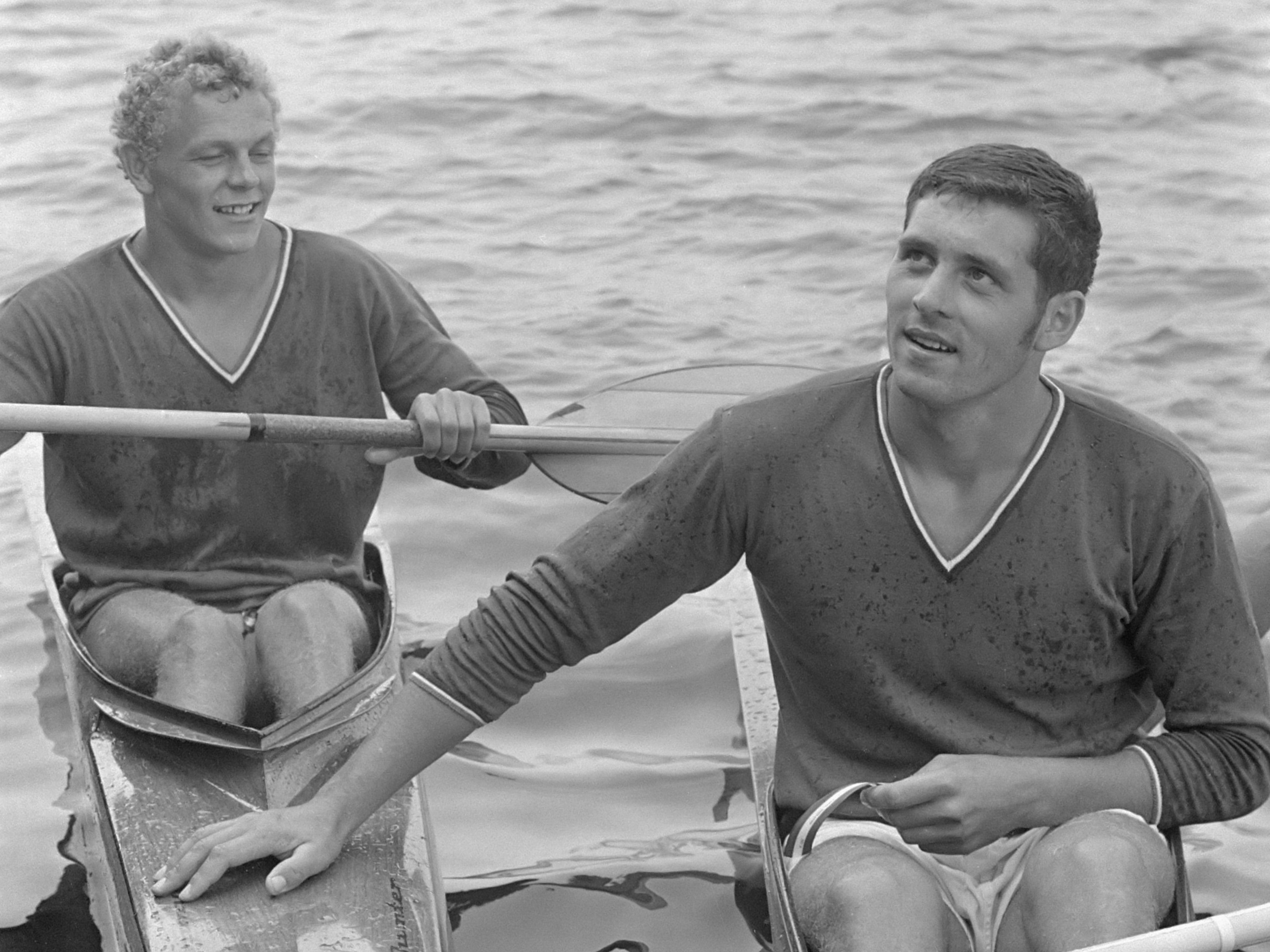
- Svidró (l.) and Csapó in 1971

Medal record

Men's canoe sprint

Representing Hungary

World Championships
Gold medal – first place	1975 Belgrade	K-1 4 x 500 m
Bronze medal – third place	1970 Copenhagen	K-1 4 x 500 m
Bronze medal – third place	1977 Sofia	K-2 500 m

József Svidró is a Hungarian sprint canoer who competed in the 1970s. He won three medals at the ICF Canoe Sprint World Championships with a gold (K-1 4 x 500 m: 1975) and two bronzes (K-1 4 x 500 m: 1970, K-2 500 m: 1977).
