= Iván Herczeg =

Hungarian canoeist

Medal record

Men's canoe sprint

World Championships
Gold medal – first place	1975 Belgrade	K-1 4 x 500 m
Silver medal – second place	1977 Sofia	K-4 10000 m

Iván Herczeg is a Hungarian sprint canoer who competed in the mid to late 1970s. He won two medals at the ICF Canoe Sprint World Championships with a gold (K-1 4 x 500 m: 1975) and a silver (K-4 10000 m: 1977).
