= Attila Adám =

Hungarian canoeist

Medal record

Men's canoe sprint

World Championships
Silver medal – second place	1991 Paris	K-4 500 m
Bronze medal – third place	1998 Szeged	K-2 1000 m

Attilla Adám is a Hungarian sprint canoer who competed in the 1990s. He won two medals at the ICF Canoe Sprint World Championships with a silver (K-4 500 m: 1991) and a bronze (K-2 1000 m: 1998).
