= Mariusz Rutkowski =

Polish canoeist

Medal record

Men's canoe sprint

World Championships
Silver medal – second place	1990 Poznań	K-4 10000 m
Bronze medal – third place	1989 Plovdiv	K-4 10000 m

Mariusz Rutkowski (born 5 September 1963) is a Polish sprint canoer who competed in the late 1980s and early 1990s. He won two medals in the K-4 10000 m event at the ICF Canoe Sprint World Championships with a silver in 1990 and a bronze in 1989.
