= Krzysztof Lepianka =

Polish canoeist

Medal record

Men's canoe sprint

World Championships
Silver medal – second place	1978 Belgrade	K-4 10000 m
Silver medal – second place	1979 Duisburg	K-4 10000 m
Bronze medal – third place	1977 Sofia	K-4 10000 m

Krzysztof Lepianka (born June 6, 1956) is a Polish sprint canoer who competed in the late 1970s and early 1980s. He won three medals in the K-4 10000 m at the ICF Canoe Sprint World Championships with two silvers (1978, 1979) and a bronze (1977).

Lepianka competed in the K-2 1000 m event at the 1980 Summer Olympics in Moscow, but was eliminated in the repechagés.
