= Frank Renner =

Medal record

Men's canoe sprint

World Championships
| Bronze medal – third place | 1981 Nottingham | K-4 1000 m |
| Bronze medal – third place | 1982 Belgrade | K-4 1000 m |

Frank Renner is a West German sprint canoer who competed in the early 1980s. He won two bronze medals in the K-4 1000 m event at the ICF Canoe Sprint World Championships, earning them in 1981 and 1982.
