= Zoltfab Eseanu =

Romanian sprint canoer

Medal record

Men's canoe sprint

World Championships
Silver medal – second place	1975 Belgrade	K-1 4 x 500 m

Zoltfab Eseanu is a Romanian sprint canoer who competed in the mid-1970s. He won a silver medal in the K-1 4 x 500 m event at the 1975 ICF Canoe Sprint World Championships in Belgrade.
