= Alfred Schmidtberger =

Austrian canoeist (1930–2020)

Medal record

Men's canoe sprint

World Championships
Bronze medal – third place	1950 Copenhagen	K-4 10000 m
Bronze medal – third place	1954 Mâcon	K-1 4 x 500 m

Alfred Schmidtberger (21 January 1930 – 18 June 2020) was an Austrian sprint canoeist who competed in the 1950s. He won two bronze medals at the ICF Canoe Sprint World Championships, earning them in the K-1 4 x 500 m (1954) and the K-4 10000 m (1950) events. Schmidtberger also competed in two Summer Olympics, earning his best finish of ninth in the K-1 10000 m event at Helsinki in 1952.

== Sources ==
- "ICF medalists for Olympic and World Championships – Part 1: flatwater (now sprint): 1936–2007" (PDF). Archived (PDF) from the original on January 5, 2010.
- "ICF medalists for Olympic and World Championships – Part 2: rest of flatwater (now sprint) and remaining canoeing disciplines: 1936–2007" (PDF). Archived (PDF) from the original on 2009-11-09.
- Alfred Schmidtberger's profile at Sports Reference.com
- Alfred Schmidtberger's obituary (in German)
