= Viktor Vorobiyev =

Medal record

Men's canoe sprint

World Championships
Gold medal – first place	1975 Belgrade	K-2 500 m
Silver medal – second place	1977 Sofia	K-2 500 m
Bronze medal – third place	1978 Belgrade	C-2 10000 m

Viktor Vorobiyev is a Soviet sprint canoer who competed in the mid to late 1970s. He won a couple of medals at the ICF Canoe Sprint World Championships with a gold (K-2 500 m: 1975), a silver (K-2 500 m: 1977), and a bronze (C-2 10000 m: 1978).
