= Viktor Bukanov =

Soviet canoeist

Medal record

Men's canoe sprint

World Championships
Silver medal – second place	1979 Duisburg	K-2 10000 m

Viktor Bukanov is a soviet sprint canoer who competed in the late 1970s. He won a silver medal in the K-2 10000 m event at the 1979 ICF Canoe Sprint World Championships in Duisburg.
