= Leonid Derevyanko =

Soviet sprint canoer

Medal record

Men's canoe sprint

World Championships
Gold medal – first place	1974 Mexico City	K-4 10000 m
Bronze medal – third place	1971 Belgrade	K-1 4 x 500 m
Bronze medal – third place	1975 Belgrade	K-4 10000 m

Leonid Derevyanko is a Soviet sprint canoer who competed in the early to mid-1970s. He won three medals at the ICF Canoe Sprint World Championships with a gold (K-4 10000 m: 1974) and two bronzes (K-1 4 x 500 m: 1971, K-4 10000 m: 1975).
