= Sergey Tsibuinikov =

Russian canoeist

Medal record

Men's canoe sprint

World Championships
Bronze medal – third place	1993 Copenhagen	K-4 10000 m

Sergey Tsibuinikov is a Russian sprint canoer who competed in the early 1990s. He won a bronze medal in the K-4 10000 m event at the 1993 ICF Canoe Sprint World Championships in Copenhagen.
