= István Tóth (canoeist) =

Hungarian sprint canoer

Medal record

Men's canoe sprint

World Championships
Silver medal – second place	1983 Tampere	K-2 10000 m
Silver medal – second place	1985 Mechelen	K-2 10000 m
Bronze medal – third place	1982 Belgrade	K-2 10000 m

István Tóth is a Hungarian sprint canoer who competed in the early to mid-1980s. He won three medals in the K-2 10000 m event at the ICF Canoe Sprint World Championships with two silvers (1983, 1985) and a bronze (1982).
