= Andrey Shchegolikhin =

Russian sprint canoer

Medal record

Men's canoe sprint

World Championships
Bronze medal – third place	1998 Szeged	K-4 500 m
Bronze medal – third place	1999 Milan	K-4 200 m

Andrey Shchegolikhin is a Russian sprint canoer who competed in the late 1990s. He won two bronze medals at the ICF Canoe Sprint World Championships, earning them in 1998 (K-4 500 m) and 1999 (K-4 200 m).
