= Igor Gaydamaka =

Medal record

Men's canoe sprint

World Championships
Gold medal – first place	1981 Nottingham	K-4 500 m
Gold medal – first place	1982 Belgrade	K-4 500 m
Silver medal – second place	1985 Mechelen	K-4 500 m
Silver medal – second place	1985 Mechelen	K-4 1000 m

Igor Gaydamaka (sometimes shown as Igor Gaidaymaka) is a Soviet sprint canoer who competed in the early 1980s. He won four medals at the ICF Canoe Sprint World Championships with two golds (K-4 500 m: 1981, 1982) and two silvers (K-4 500 m: 1985, K-4 1000 m: 1985).
