= Nikolay Baranov =

Soviet canoeist (born 1960)

Medal record

Men's canoe sprint

Representing Soviet Union

World Championships
| Gold medal – first place | 1981 Nottingham | K-4 10000 m |
| Gold medal – first place | 1982 Belgrade | K-4 10000 m |
| Gold medal – first place | 1983 Tampere | K-4 10000 m |
| Silver medal – second place | 1981 Nottingham | K-4 1000 m |

Nikolay Baranov (born 17 March 1960 in Kremenchuk, Ukrainian SSR) was a Soviet sprint canoeist who competed in the early 1980s. He won four medals at the ICF Canoe Sprint World Championships with three golds (K-4 10000 m: 1981, 1982, 1983) and a silver (K-4 1000 m: 1981).
