= Zoltán Kovács (canoeist) =

Hungarian canoeist

Medal record

Men's canoe sprint

World Championships
Gold medal – first place	1985 Mechelen	K-4 10000 m
Gold medal – first place	1986 Montreal	K-4 1000 m
Gold medal – first place	1987 Duisburg	K-4 1000 m

Zoltán Kovács is a Hungarian sprint canoeist who competed in the late 1980s. He won three gold medals at the ICF Canoe Sprint World Championships with two in the K-4 1000 m (1986, 1987) and one in the K-4 10000 m (1985).
