= Pytor Greshta =

Russian canoeist

Medal record

Men's canoe sprint

World Championships
| Gold medal – first place | 1973 Tampere | K-2 500 m |
| Bronze medal – third place | 1971 Belgrade | K-2 500 m |

Pytor Greshta is a Soviet sprint canoer who competed in the early 1970s. He won two medals in the K-2 500 m event at the ICF Canoe Sprint World Championships with a gold in 1973 and a bronze in 1971.
