= Jan Günther =

German sprint canoer

Medal record

Men's canoe sprint

World Championships
Silver medal – second place	1997 Dartmouth	K-4 500 m
Bronze medal – third place	1995 Duisburg	K-4 200 m
Bronze medal – third place	1997 Dartmouth	K-4 200 m

Jan Günther is a German sprint canoer who competed in the late 1990s. He won three medals at the ICF Canoe Sprint World Championships with a silver (K-4 500 m: 1997) and two bronzes (K-4 200 m: 1995).
