= Sergey Superata =

Russian canoeist

Medal record

Men's canoe sprint

Representing Soviet Union

World Championships
Gold medal – first place	1981 Nottingham	K-2 500 m
Gold medal – first place	1981 Nottingham	K-2 1000 m
Gold medal – first place	1982 Belgrade	K-2 500 m
Gold medal – first place	1982 Belgrade	K-2 1000 m
Gold medal – first place	1989 Plovdiv	K-4 10000 m
Silver medal – second place	1983 Tampere	K-2 500 m
Silver medal – second place	1983 Tampere	K-2 1000 m
Silver medal – second place	1985 Mechelen	K-2 1000 m
Bronze medal – third place	1985 Mechelen	K-2 500 m
Bronze medal – third place	1986 Montreal	K-2 500 m

Sergey Superata is a Soviet sprint canoer who competed in the 1980s. He won ten medals at the ICF Canoe Sprint World Championships with five golds (K-2 500 m: 1981, 1982; K-2 1000 m: 1981, 1982; K-4 10000 m: 1989), three silver (K-2 500 m: 1983, (K-4 1000 m: 1983, 1985) and two bronzes (K-2 500 m: 1985, 1986).
