= Herbert Laabs =

Medal record

Men's canoe sprint

World Championships
| Gold medal – first place | 1974 Mexico City | K-4 1000 m |
| Silver medal – second place | 1975 Belgrade | K-2 500 m |
| Silver medal – second place | 1975 Belgrade | K-4 1000 m |
| Bronze medal – third place | 1973 Tampere | K-2 1000 m |
| Bronze medal – third place | 1974 Mexico City | K-2 500 m |

Herbert Laabs (born 24 October 1950) is an East German sprint canoeist who competed in the early to mid-1970s. He won four medals at the ICF Canoe Sprint World Championships with a gold (K-4 1000 m: 1974), two silvers (K-2 500 m and K-4 1000 m: both 1975), and two bronzes (K-2 500 m and K-2 1000 m: 1973).

Laabs also competed in the K-4 1000 m event at the 1972 Summer Olympics in Munich, but was eliminated in the semifinals.
