= Anatoly Tishchenko Sr. =

Soviet canoer (born 1943)

Medal record

Men's canoe sprint

World Championships
Gold medal – first place	1970 Copenhagen	K-1 500 m
Gold medal – first place	1970 Copenhagen	K-1 4 x 500 m
Bronze medal – third place	1971 Belgrade	K-1 4 x 500 m

Anatoliy Ivanovich Tischenko (Russian: Анато́лий Петро́вич Ти́щенко; born August 22, 1943) is a Soviet sprint canoer who competed in the early 1970s. He won three medals at the ICF Canoe Sprint World Championships with two golds (K-1 500 m and K-1 4 x 500 m: both 1970) and a bronze (K-1 4 x 500 m: 1971).

He is the father of fellow Soviet canoer Anatoly Tishchenko.
