= Aleksandr Vodovatov =

Medal record

Men's canoe sprint

World Championships
Gold medal – first place	1981 Nottingham	K-4 500 m
Gold medal – first place	1982 Belgrade	K-4 500 m
Silver medal – second place	1983 Tampere	K-4 500 m
Silver medal – second place	1985 Mechelen	K-4 500 m
Silver medal – second place	1985 Mechelen	K-4 1000 m
Bronze medal – third place	1983 Tampere	K-4 1000 m

Aleksandr Vodovatov is a Soviet sprint canoer who competed from the early to mid-1980s. He won six medals at the ICF Canoe Sprint World Championships with two golds (K-4 500 m: 1981, 1982), three silvers (K-4 500 m: 1983, 1985; K-4 1000 m: 1985), and a bronze (K-4 1000 m: 1983).
