= Luca Negri =

Italian canoeist (born 1973)

Medal record

Men's canoe sprint

World Championships
Gold medal – first place	1997 Dartmouth	K-2 1000 m
Gold medal – first place	1998 Szeged	K-2 1000 m
Silver medal – second place	1997 Dartmouth	K-2 500 m
Silver medal – second place	1998 Szeged	K-2 500 m
Silver medal – second place	1998 Szeged	K-4 200 m

Luca Negri (born 4 October 1973) is an Italian sprint canoer who competed in the late 1990s. He won five medals at the ICF Canoe Sprint World Championships with two golds(K-2 1000 m: 1997, 1998) and three silvers (K-2 500 m: 1997, 1998; K-4 200 m: 1998)

Negri also competed in the K-4 1000 m event at the 1996 Summer Olympics in Atlanta, but was eliminated in the semifinals.
