= Vasilie Simiocenco =

Romanian sprint canoeist (born 1947)

Medal record

Men's canoe sprint

World Championships
Gold medal – first place	1971 Belgrade	K-4 10000 m
Silver medal – second place	1975 Belgrade	K-4 10000 m
Silver medal – second place	1977 Sofia	K-4 500 m
Bronze medal – third place	1970 Copenhagen	K-2 10000 m
Bronze medal – third place	1971 Belgrade	K-2 1000 m
Bronze medal – third place	1973 Tampere	K-1 4 x 500 m
Bronze medal – third place	1973 Tampere	K-4 10000 m

Vasile Simiocencu (born January 8, 1947) is a Romanian sprint canoeist who competed in the 1970s. He won seven medals at the ICF Canoe Sprint World Championships with a gold (K-4 10000 m: 1971), two silvers (K-4 500 m: 1977, K-4 10000 m: 1975), and four bronzes (K-1 4 x 500 m: 1973, K-2 1000 m: 1971, K-2 10000 m: 1970, K-4 10000 m: 1973).

Simiocencu also competed in two Summer Olympics, earning his best finish of fourth in the K-4 1000 m event at Montreal in 1976.
