= Sergey Krivozheyev =

Soviet sprint canoe racer

Medal record

Men's canoe sprint

World Championships
Gold medal – first place	1981 Nottingham	K-4 500 m
Gold medal – first place	1982 Belgrade	K-4 500 m

Sergey Krivozheyev is a Soviet sprint canoe racer who competed in the early 1980s. He won two gold medals in the K-4 500 m event at the ICF Canoe Sprint World Championships in 1981 and 1982.
