= Sergey Nikolskiy =

Soviet sprint canoer

Medal record

Men's canoe sprint

World Championships
Gold medal – first place	1973 Tampere	K-1 4 x 500 m
Gold medal – first place	1977 Sofia	K-4 10000 m
Gold medal – first place	1978 Belgrade	K-4 10000 m
Gold medal – first place	1979 Duisburg	K-4 10000 m
Silver medal – second place	1977 Sofia	K-4 1000 m

Sergey Nikolskiy is a Soviet sprint canoer who competed in the mid to late 1970s. He won five medals at the ICF Canoe Sprint World Championships with four golds (K-1 4 x 500 m: 1973, K-4 10000 m: 1977, 1978, 1979), and a silver (K-4 1000 m: 1977).
