= Stanislav Boreyko =

Russian canoeist

Medal record

Men's canoe sprint

World Championships
Silver medal – second place	1989 Plovdiv	K-1 10000 m
Bronze medal – third place	1986 Montreal	K-1 10000 m

Stanislav Boreyko (born 7 April 1965) is a Soviet sprint canoeist who competed in the late 1980s. He won two medals in the K-1 10000 m event at the ICF Canoe Sprint World Championships with a silver (1989) and a bronze (1986).
