= Konstantin Kostenko =

Personal information
- Born: 10 November 1939 Magadan, Russian SFSR, Soviet Union
- Died: 6 February 2004 (aged 64) Barnaul, Russia

Sport
- Sport: Canoe sprint
Medal record
Representing the Soviet Union
World Championships
| Gold medal – first place | 1970 Copenhagen | K-2 10000 m |
| Gold medal – first place | 1971 Belgrade | K-2 10000 m |
| Bronze medal – third place | 1974 Mexico City | K-2 10000 m |
European Championships
| Gold medal – first place | 1967 Duisburg | K-1 10000 m |
| Bronze medal – third place | 1969 Moscow | K-1 10000 m |

Konstantin Kostenko (Russian: Константин Костенко; 10 November 1939 – 6 February 2004) was a Soviet sprint canoer who competed in the late 1960s and in the early 1970s. He won three medals in the K-2 10000 m event at the ICF Canoe Sprint World Championships with two golds (1970, 1971) and a bronze (1974).
