= Andrzej Gryczko =

Polish sprint canoer

Medal record

Men's canoe sprint

World Championships
Silver medal – second place	1990 Poznań	K-4 10000 m
Silver medal – second place	1993 Copenhagen	K-4 10000 m

Andrzej Gryczko is a Polish sprint canoer who competed in the early 1990s. He won two silver medals in the K-4 10000 m event at the ICF Canoe Sprint World Championships, earning them in 1990 and 1993.
