= Vladimir Zemlyakov =

Medal record

Men's canoe sprint

World Championships
Silver medal – second place	1966 East Berlin	K-1 10000 m
Bronze medal – third place	1971 Belgrade	K-4 10000 m

Vladimir Zemlyakov (sometimes listed as Vladimir Semiyakov) is a Soviet sprint canoeist who competed in the late 1960s and early 1970s. He won two medals at the ICF Canoe Sprint World Championships with a silver (K-1 10000 m: 1966) and a bronze (K-4 10000 m: 1971).
