= Aleksandr Avdeyev (canoeist) =

Soviet canoeist (born 1956)

Medal record

Men's canoe sprint

Representing Latvia

World Championships
Gold medal – first place	1977 Sofia	K-4 10000 m
Gold medal – first place	1978 Belgrade	K-4 10000 m
Gold medal – first place	1979 Duisburg	K-4 10000 m
Gold medal – first place	1983 Tampere	K-4 10000 m
Silver medal – second place	1977 Sofia	K-4 1000 m
Bronze medal – third place	1979 Duisburg	K-4 1000 m

Aleksandr Avdeyev (also known as Aleksandrs Avdejevs; born 1 August 1956) is a Soviet former sprint canoer who competed in the late 1970s and early 1980s. He has won six medals at the ICF Canoe Sprint World Championships, with four golds (K-4 10000 m: 1977, 1978, 1979, 1983), a silver (K-4 1000 m: 1977), and a bronze (K-4 1000 m: 1979).

Avdeyev also finished seventh in the K-4 1000 m event at the 1980 Summer Olympics in Moscow.
