= Andre Plitkin =

Medal record

Men's canoe sprint

World Championships
Bronze medal – third place	1991 Paris	K-4 500 m

Andre Plitkin is a Soviet sprint canoer who competed in the early 1990s. He won a bronze medal in the K-4 500 m event at the 1991 ICF Canoe Sprint World Championships in Paris.
