= Gábor Szabó (canoeist) =

Hungarian sprint canoer

Medal record

Men's canoe sprint

World Championships
Silver medal – second place	1995 Duisburg	K-4 1000 m
Silver medal – second place	1997 Dartmouth	K-4 1000 m
Bronze medal – third place	1990 Poznań	K-2 1000 m

Gábor Szabó is a Hungarian sprint canoer who competed from the late 1980s to the late 1990s. He won three medals at the ICF Canoe Sprint World Championships with two silvers (K-4 1000 m: 1995, 1997) and a bronze (K-2 1000 m: 1990)..
