= Zoltán Böjti =

Hungarian canoeist

Medal record

Men's canoe sprint

World Championships
Gold medal – first place	1985 Mechelen	K-4 10000 m
Silver medal – second place	1987 Duisburg	K-4 10000 m

Zoltán Bötji is a Hungarian sprint canoer who competed in the late 1980s. He won two medals in the K-4 10000 m event at the ICF Canoe Sprint World Championships with a gold in 1985 and a silver in 1987.
