= Ákos Angyal =

Hungarian canoeist

Medal record

Men's canoe sprint

World Championships
| Silver medal – second place | 1989 Plovdiv | K-4 10000 m |
| Bronze medal – third place | 1991 Paris | K-2 1000 m |

Ákos Angyal is a Hungarian sprint canoer who competed in the late 1980s and early 1990s. He won a silver medal in the K-4 10000 m event at the 1989 ICF Canoe Sprint World Championships in Plovdiv and a bronze medal in the K-2 1000 m event at the 1991 ICF Canoe Sprint World Championships in Paris.
