= Pytor Zhurga =

Soviet canoeist

Medal record

Men's canoe sprint

World Championships
Gold medal – first place	1974 Mexico City	K-4 10000 m
Bronze medal – third place	1975 Belgrade	K-4 10000 m

Pytor Zhurga is a former Soviet sprint canoer who competed in the mid-1970s. He won two medals in the K-4 10000 m at the ICF Canoe Sprint World Championships with a gold in 1974 and a bronze in 1975.
