= Petras Šiurskas =

Lithuanian Soviet sprint canoer (born 1953)

Medal record

Men's canoe sprint

World Championships
Gold medal – first place	1977 Sofia	K-2 10000 m
Bronze medal – third place	1975 Belgrade	K-2 10000 m

Petras Šiurskas (born 11 August 1953) is a Lithuanian Soviet sprint canoer who competed in the mid to late 1970s. He won two medals in the K-2 10000 m event at the ICF Canoe Sprint World Championships with a gold in 1977 and a bronze in 1975.
