= Zsolt Borhi =

Hungarian sprint canoeist

Medal record

Men's canoe sprint

World Championships
Gold medal – first place	1993 Copenhagen	K-2 10000 m
Gold medal – first place	1994 Mexico City	K-1 500 m
Silver medal – second place	1993 Copenhagen	K-4 1000 m
Silver medal – second place	1994 Mexico City	K-1 1000 m

Zsolt Borhi is a Hungarian sprint canoeist who competed in the mid-1990s. He won four medals at the ICF Canoe Sprint World Championships with two golds(K-2 10000 m: 1993K-1 500 m: 1994) and two silvers (K-1 1000 m: 1994, K-4 1000 m: 1993).
