= Martin Vázquez =

Spanish canoeist

Medal record

Men's canoe sprint

World Championships
Bronze medal – third place	1975 Belgrade	K-1 4 x 500 m
Bronze medal – third place	1977 Sofia	K-4 500 m

Martín Vázquez is a Spanish former sprint canoer who competed in the mid to late 1970s. He won two bronze medals at the ICF Canoe Sprint World Championships, earning them in 1975 (K-1 4 x 500 m) and in 1977 (K-4 500 m).
