= Peter Hempel =

German canoeist (born 1959)

Medal record

Men's canoe sprint

World Championships
Gold medal – first place	1981 Nottingham	K-4 1000 m
Gold medal – first place	1983 Tampere	K-4 500 m
Gold medal – first place	1985 Mechelen	K-4 500 m
Silver medal – second place	1982 Belgrade	K-1 500 m
Silver medal – second place	1982 Belgrade	K-4 1000 m
Silver medal – second place	1983 Tampere	K-4 1000 m
Bronze medal – third place	1978 Belgrade	K-1 500 m
Bronze medal – third place	1979 Duisburg	K-1 500 m
Bronze medal – third place	1985 Mechelen	K-4 1000 m

Peter Hempel (born 30 April 1959) is an East German canoe sprinter.

== Sports career ==
Hempel competed from the late 1970s to the mid-1980s. He won nine medals at the ICF Canoe Sprint World Championships with three golds (K-4 500 m: 1983, 1985; K-4 1000 m: 1981), three silvers (K-1 500 m: 1982, K-4 1000 m: 1982, 1983), and three bronzes (K-1 500 m: 1978, 1979; K-4 1000 m: 1985).

Hempel also finished fifth in the K-2 1000 m event at the 1980 Summer Olympics in Moscow.
