= Vitaliy Trukshin =

Medal record

Men's canoe sprint

World Championships
Gold medal – first place	1973 Tampere	K-1 4 x 500 m
Silver medal – second place	1973 Tampere	K-1 500 m
Silver medal – second place	1974 Mexico City	K-1 4 x 500 m
Bronze medal – third place	1978 Belgrade	K-1 1000 m

Vitaliy Trukshin is a Soviet sprint canoeist who competed during the 1970s. He won four medals at the ICF Canoe Sprint World Championships with a gold (K-1 4 x 500 m: 1973), two silvers (K-1 500 m: 1973, K-1 4 x 500 m: 1974), and a bronze (K-1 1000 m: 1978).
