= Aleksandr Yermilov =

Kayaker

Medal record

Men's canoe sprint

Representing Soviet Union

World Championships
Gold medal – first place	1981 Nottingham	K-4 10000 m
Gold medal – first place	1982 Belgrade	K-4 10000 m
Gold medal – first place	1983 Tampere	K-4 10000 m
Silver medal – second place	1981 Nottingham	K-4 1000 m

Aleksandr Yermilov (Hebrew: אלכסנדר ירמילוב; born 12 November 1960) is a Soviet flatwater kayaker/sprint canoer who competed in the early 1980s. He won four medal at the ICF Canoe Sprint World Championships with three golds (K-4 10000 m: 1981 in Nottingham, Great Britain, 1982 in Belgrade, Yugoslavia; 1983 in Tampere, Finland) and a silver (K-4 1000 m: 1981).

He was born in Kharkiv, Ukraine. In the 1990s he immigrated to Israel. Then to Canada.
