= Paul Felinger =

Austrian canoeist (1913–1992)

Medal record

Men's canoe sprint

World Championships
| Silver medal – second place | 1948 London | K-4 1000 m |
| Bronze medal – third place | 1950 Copenhagen | K-4 1000 m |

Paul Felinger (20 June 1913 – 14 June 1992) was an Austrian sprint canoer who competed in the late 1940s and early 1950s. He won two medals in the K-4 1000 m event at the ICF Canoe Sprint World Championships with a silver in 1948 and a bronze in 1950.
