= Aleksandr Myzgin =

Medal record

Men's canoe sprint

Representing Soviet Union

World Championships
Gold medal – first place	1989 Plovdiv	K-4 10000 m
Gold medal – first place	1990 Poznań	K-4 10000 m
Silver medal – second place	1985 Mechelen	K-4 1000 m

Aleksandr Myzgin (born 22 April 1964 in Gomel, Byelorussian SSR) is a Soviet sprint canoer who competed from the mid-1980s to the early 1990s. He won three medals at the ICF Canoe Sprint World Championships with two golds (K-4 10000 m: 1989, 1990) and a silver (K-4 1000 m: 1985).
