= Nikolay Stepanenko =

Medal record

Men's canoe sprint

World Championships
Silver medal – second place	1978 Belgrade	K-1 10000 m
Bronze medal – third place	1977 Sofia	K-1 10000 m
Bronze medal – third place	1979 Duisburg	K-1 10000 m

Nikolay Stepanenko (born 1956, Gomel Oblast, Belarus) is a Soviet sprint canoeist who competed in the late 1970s. He won three medals in the K-1 10000 m event at the ICF Canoe Sprint World Championships with a silver (1978) and two bronzes (1977, 1979).
