= Helmuth Stocker =

West German sprint canoer

Medal record

Men's canoe sprint

World Championships
Bronze medal – third place	1954 Mâcon	K-2 10000 m
Bronze medal – third place	1958 Prague	K-2 10000 m

Helmuth Stocker is a West German sprint canoer who competed in the mid to late 1950s. He won two bronze medals in the K-2 10000 m at the ICF Canoe Sprint World Championships, earning them in 1954 and 1958.
