= Grzegorz Kołtan =

Polish canoeist

Medal record

Men's canoe sprint

World Championships
Gold medal – first place	1977 Sofia	K-4 500 m
Gold medal – first place	1977 Sofia	K-4 1000 m
Silver medal – second place	1979 Duisburg	K-4 1000 m
Bronze medal – third place	1974 Mexico City	K-4 10000 m
Bronze medal – third place	1978 Belgrade	K-4 500 m
Bronze medal – third place	1979 Duisburg	K-4 500 m

Grzegorz Kołtan (born 15 September 1955) is a Polish sprint canoeist who competed from the mid to late 1970s. He won six medals at the ICF Canoe Sprint World Championships with two golds (K-4 500 m: 1977, K-4 1000 m: 1977), a silver (K-4 1000 m: 1979), and three bronzes (K-4 500 m: 1978; K-4 10000 m: 1974).

Kołtan also competed in two Summer Olympics, earning his best finish of fourth in the K-4 1000 m event at Moscow in 1980.
