= Vladimir Bobrezhov =

Russian canoeist

Medal record

Men's canoe sprint

Representing Soviet Union

World Championships
| Gold medal – first place | 1989 Plovdiv | K-4 10000 m |
| Gold medal – first place | 1990 Poznań | K-4 10000 m |
| Silver medal – second place | 1989 Plovdiv | K-2 1000 m |
| Silver medal – second place | 1990 Poznań | K-2 1000 m |

Representing Russia

World Championships
| Bronze medal – third place | 1993 Copenhagen | K-4 10000 m |

Vladimir Bobrezhov (sometimes listed as Vladimir Borbreshov, born 14 April 1968) is a Soviet sprint canoeist who competed in the late 1980s and early 1990s. He won five medals at the ICF Canoe Sprint World Championships with two golds (K-4 10000 m: 1989, 1990), two silvers (K-2 1000 m: 1989, 1990), and a bronze (K-4 10000 m: 1993).

Bobrezhov also competed for the Unified Team at the 1992 Summer Olympics in Barcelona in the K-4 1000 m event, but was eliminated in the semifinals.
