= Sergey Kolokolov =

Soviet canoeist (1962–2008)

Personal information
- Born: 11 April 1962 Kherson, Soviet Union
- Died: 25 September 2008 (aged 46) Kherson, Ukraine

Sport
- Sport: Canoe sprint
Medal record
Representing Soviet Union
World Championships
| Gold medal – first place | 1981 Nottingham | K-4 10000 m |
| Gold medal – first place | 1982 Belgrade | K-4 500 m |
| Silver medal – second place | 1981 Nottingham | K-4 1000 m |
| Silver medal – second place | 1983 Tampere | K-4 500 m |
| Bronze medal – third place | 1983 Tampere | K-4 1000 m |
Summer Universiade
| Silver medal – second place | 1987 Zagreb | K-4 500 m |

Sergey Viktorovich Kolokolov (Russian: Серге́й Ви́кторович Ко́локолов; 11 April 1962 – 25 September 2008) was a Soviet flatwater canoer who competed in the early 1980s. He won five medals at the ICF Canoe Sprint World Championships with two golds (K-4 500 m: 1982, K-4 10000 m: 1981), two silvers (K-4 500 m: 1983, K-4 1000 m: 1981), and a bronze (K-4 1000 m: 1983). He later studied engineering at Kherson State University. He died at Kherson on 25 September 2008.
