= Márton Bauer =

Hungarian canoeist

Medal record

Men's canoe sprint

World Championships
Silver medal – second place	1997 Dartmouth	K-4 1000 m
Silver medal – second place	1998 Szeged	K-4 500 m
Silver medal – second place	1998 Szeged	K-4 1000 m

Márton Bauer is a Hungarian sprint canoer who competed in the late 1990s. He won three silver medals at the ICF Canoe Sprint World Championships (K-4 500 m: 1998; K-4 1000 m: 1997, 1998).
