= Maximilian Benassi =

Italian canoeist

Medal record

Men's canoe sprint

World Championships
Bronze medal – third place	2010 Poznań	K-1 5000 m
Bronze medal – third place	2011 Szeged	K-1 5000 m

Maximilian Benassi is an Italian sprint canoeist who has competed since the late 2000s. He won the bronze medal in the K-1 5000 m event at the 2010 ICF Canoe Sprint World Championships in Poznań and another a year later in Szeged.

Benassi is an athlete of the Gruppo Sportivo Fiamme Gialle,
