= Volker Kreutzer =

West German sprint canoer of the 1980s

Medal record

Men's canoe sprint

World Championships
| Silver medal – second place | 1989 Plovdiv | K-4 500 m |
| Bronze medal – third place | 1986 Montreal | K-4 500 m |
| Bronze medal – third place | 1987 Duisburg | K-4 500 m |

Volker Kreutzer is a West German sprint canoer who competed in the late 1980s. He won three medals in the K-4 500 m event at the ICF Canoe Sprint World Championships with a silver (1989) and two bronzes (1986, 1987).
