= Peter Orban =

Swedish sprint canoeist (born 1961)

Medal record

Men's canoe sprint

World Championships
Bronze medal – third place	1990 Poznań	K-4 10000 m
Bronze medal – third place	1991 Paris	K-4 10000 m

Peter Orban (born 4 November 1961) is a Swedish sprint canoer who competed in the early 1990s. He won two bronze medals in the K-4 10000 m event at the ICF Canoe Sprint World Championships, earning them in 1990 and 1991.
