= Zoltán Berkes (canoeist) =

Hungarian canoeist

Medal record

Men's canoe sprint

World Championships
Silver medal – second place	1987 Duisburg	K-4 10000 m
Bronze medal – third place	1989 Plovdiv	K-2 1000 m

Zoltán Berkes is a Hungarian sprint canoer who competed in the late 1980s. He won two medals at the ICF Canoe Sprint World Championships with a silver (K-4 10000 m: 1987) and a bronze (K-2 1000 m: 1989).
