= Viktor Zavolskiy =

Russian sprint canoer (born 1990)

Medal record

Men's canoe sprint

World Championships
Silver medal – second place	2011 Szeged	K-1 4 x 200 m
Bronze medal – third place	2010 Poznań	K-1 4 x 200 m

Viktor Zavolskiy (born 28 July 1990) is a Russian sprint canoer who has competed since the late 2000s. He won a silver medal in the K-1 4 x 200 m event at the 2011 ICF Canoe Sprint World Championships in Szeged and a bronze medal in the K-1 4 x 200 m event at the 2010 ICF Canoe Sprint World Championships in Poznań.
