= Oier Aizpurua =

Spanish canoeist

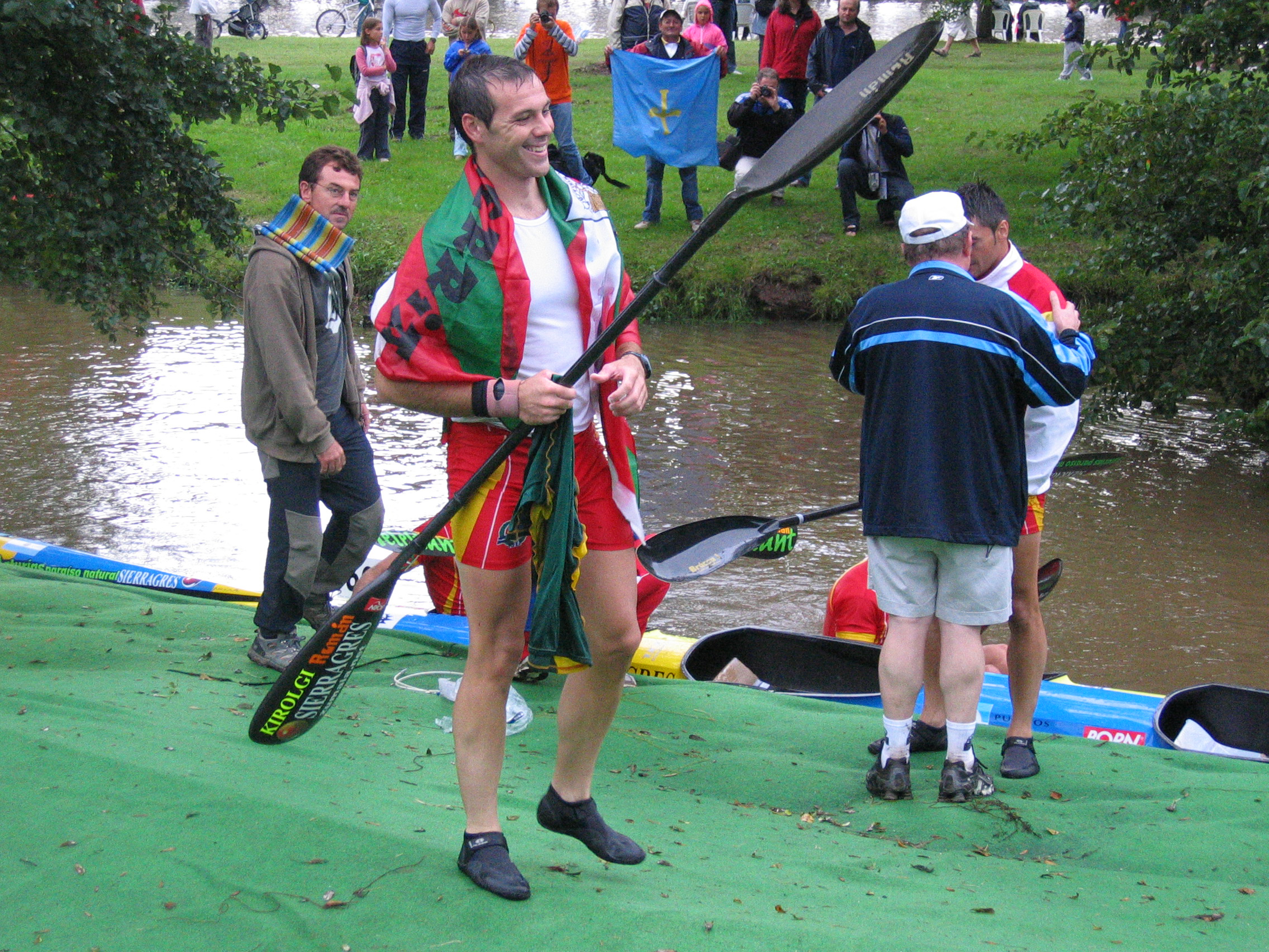
- Oier Aizpurua in Tremolat, 2006

Personal information
- Full name: Oier Aizpurua Aranzadi
- Nationality: Spanish
- Born: 6 November 1977 (age 48) Zumaia, Spain
Medal record
Men's canoe sprint
Representing Spain
World Championships
Silver medal – second place	2002 Seville	K-4 200 m
Bronze medal – third place	2002 Seville	K-4 500 m
Bronze medal – third place	2003 Gainesville	K-4 200 m

Oier Aizpurua Aranzadi (Note: In this Spanish name, the first or paternal surname is Aizpurua and the second or maternal family name is Aranzadi.) (born 6 November 1977 in Zumaia) is a Spanish sprint canoer who competed in the early 2000s. He won three medals at the ICF Canoe Sprint World Championships with a silver (K-4 200 m: 2002) and two bronzes (K-4 200 m: 2003, K-4 500 m: 2002).
