= Przemysław Gawrych =

Medal record

Men's canoe sprint

World Championships
Bronze medal – third place	2005 Zagreb	K-4 1000 m
Bronze medal – third place	2006 Szeged	K-4 500 m

Przemysław Gawrych is a Poland sprint canoer who competed in the mid-2000s. He won two bronze medals at the ICF Canoe Sprint World Championships (K-4 500 m: 2006, K-4 1000 m: 2005).
