= Antrop Varabiev =

Romanian canoeist

Medal record

Men's canoe sprint

World Championships
Gold medal – first place	1974 Mexico City	K-2 10000 m
Silver medal – second place	1973 Tampere	K-2 10000 m
Bronze medal – third place	1971 Belgrade	K-2 10000 m

Antrop Varabiev is a Romanian sprint canoer who competed in the early to mid-1970s. He won a complete set of medals in the K-2 10000 m event at the ICF Canoe Sprint World Championships (gold: 1974, silver: 1973, bronze: 1971).
