= Roland Graupner =

East German canoeist

Medal record

Men's canoe sprint

World Championships
Gold medal – first place	1978 Belgrade	K-4 500 m
Gold medal – first place	1979 Duisburg	K-4 500 m

Roland Graupner is an East German sprint canoer who competed in the late 1970s. He won two gold medals in the K-4 500 m event at the ICF Canoe Sprint World Championships, earning them in 1978 and 1979.
