= Thomas Vaske =

East German sprint canoer

Medal record

Men's canoe sprint

World Championships
Silver medal – second place	1986 Montreal	K-4 1000 m
Bronze medal – third place	1987 Duisburg	K-2 1000 m
Bronze medal – third place	1989 Plovdiv	K-4 1000 m

Thomas Vaske is an East German sprint canoer who competed in the late 1980s. He won three medals at the ICF Canoe Sprint World Championships with a silver (K-4 1000 m: 1986) and two bronzes (K-2 1000 m: 1987, K-4 1000 m: 1989).
