= Cuprian Macarencu =

Romanian canoeist

Medal record

Men's canoe sprint

World Championships
Gold medal – first place	1971 Belgrade	K-4 10000 m
Silver medal – second place	1975 Belgrade	K-4 10000 m
Bronze medal – third place	1973 Tampere	K-4 10000 m
Bronze medal – third place	1977 Sofia	K-2 10000 m
Bronze medal – third place	1978 Belgrade	K-4 10000 m

Cuprian Macarencu is a Romanian sprint canoer who competed in the 1970s. He won five medals at the ICF Canoe Sprint World Championships with a gold (K-4 10000 m: 1971), a silver (K-4 10000 m: 1975), and three bronzes (K-2 10000 m: 1977, K-4 10000 m: 1973, 1978).
