= Canoeing at the 1976 Summer Olympics – Men's C-2 500 metres =

The men's C-2 500 metres event was an open-style, pairs canoeing event conducted as part of the Canoeing at the 1976 Summer Olympics program. This event made its debut at these games.

== Medalists ==
Gold	Silver	Bronze
Serhei Petrenko and Aleksandr Vinogradov (URS)	Jerzy Opara and Andrzej Gronowicz (POL)	Tamás Buday and Oszkár Frey (HUN)

== Results ==
=== Heats ===
The 15 teams first raced in two heats on July 28. The top three finishers from each of the heats advanced directly to the semifinals and the remaining nine teams were relegated to the repechages.

Heat 1
1.	Tamás Buday and Oszkár Frey (HUN)	1:56.44	QS
2.	Gheorghe Danielov and Gheorghe Simionov (ROU)	1:57.27	QS
3.	Gregory Smith and John Wood (CAN)	1:57.81	QS
4.	Bernt Lindelöf and Eric Zeidlitz (SWE)	1:58.86	QR
5.	Roland Muhlen and Andreas Weigand (USA)	2:00.99	QR
6.	Gérald Delacroix and Jean-François Millot (FRA)	2:02.78	QR
7.	Roberto Altamirano and Juan Martínez (MEX)	2:08.15	QR
8.	Mitsuhide Hata and Atsunobu Ogata (JPN)	2:09.32	QR
Heat 2
1.	Serhei Petrenko and Aleksandr Vinogradov (URS)	1:58.22	QS
2.	Ivan Burchin and Krasimir Khristov (BUL)	1:58.84	QS
3.	Jerzy Opara and Andrzej Gronowicz (POL)	1:58.90	QS
4.	Detlef Bothe and Hans-Jürgen Tode (GDR)	1:59.39	QR
5.	Hermann Glaser and Heinz Lucke (FRG)	2:07.63	QR
6.	Jiří Čtvrtečka and Tomáš Šach (TCH)	2:09.37	QR
7.	Tiziano Annoni and Ilario Passerini (ITA)	2:10.73	QR

=== Repechages ===
Taking place on July 28, the top three finishers from each of the repechages advanced to the semifinals.

Repechage 1
1.	Hermann Glaser and Heinz Lucke (FRG)	1:53.76	QS
2.	Gérald Delacroix and Jean-François Millet (FRA)	1:53.81	QS
3.	Bernt Lindelöf and Eric Zeidlitz (SWE)	1:53.94	QS
4.	Tiziano Annoni and Ilario Passerini (ITA)	1:56.36
-	Mitsuhide Hata and Atsunobu Ogata (JPN)	DISQ
Repechage 2
1.	Jiří Čtvrtečka and Tomáš Šach (TCH)	1:56.02	QS
2.	Detlef Bothe and Hans-Jürgen Tode (GDR)	1:57.07	QS
3.	Roland Muhlen and Andreas Weigand (USA)	1:57.58	QS
4.	Roberto Altamirano and Juan Martínez (MEX)	2:00.52

Japan's reason for disqualification was not disclosed in the official report.

=== Semifinals ===
Three semifinals were held on July 30. The top three finishers from each of the semifinals advanced to the final.

Semifinal 1
1.	Jerzy Opara and Andrzej Gronowicz (POL)	1:49.04	QF
2.	Tamás Buday and Oszkár Frey (HUN)	1:49.60	QF
3.	Jiří Čtvrtečka and Tomáš Šach (TCH)	1:51.83	QF
4.	Bernt Lindelöf and Eric Zeidlitz (SWE)	1:55.69
Semifinal 2
1.	Serhei Petrenko and Aleksandr Vinogradov (URS)	1:49.29	QF
2.	Gregory Smith and John Wood (CAN)	1:50.66	QF
3.	Gérald Delacroix and Jean-François Millot (FRA)	1:50.81	QF
4.	Detlef Bothe and Hans-Jürgen Tode (GDR)	1:53.85
Semifinal 3
1.	Gheorghe Danielov and Gheorghe Simionov (ROU)	1:50.56	QF
2.	Ivan Burchin and Krasimir Khristov (BUL)	1:51.63	QF
3.	Hermann Glaser and Heinz Lucke (FRG)	1:51.89	QF
4.	Roland Muhlen and Andreas Weigand (USA)	1:52.33

=== Final ===
The final was held on July 30.

	Serhei Petrenko and Aleksandr Vinogradov (URS)	1:45.81
	Jerzy Opara and Andrzej Gronowicz (POL)	1:47.77
	Tamás Buday and Oszkár Frey (HUN)	1:48.35
4.	Gheorghe Danielov and Gheorghe Simionov (ROU)	1:48.64
5.	Gérald Delacroix and Jean-François Millot (FRA)	1:49.74
6.	Ivan Burchin and Krasimir Khristov (BUL)	1:50.43
7.	Gregory Smith and John Wood (CAN)	1:50.74
8.	Jiří Čtvrtečka and Tomáš Šach (TCH)	1:50.85
9.	Hermann Glaser and Heinz Lucke (FRG)	1:51.26
