= Canoeing at the 1976 Summer Olympics – Men's C-2 1000 metres =

The men's C-2 1000 metres event was an open-style, pairs canoeing event conducted as part of the Canoeing at the 1976 Summer Olympics program.

== Medalists ==
Gold	Silver	Bronze
Serhei Petrenko and Aleksandr Vinogradov (URS)	Gheorge Danielov and Gheorghe Simionov (ROU)	Tamás Buday and Oszkár Frey (HUN)

== Results ==
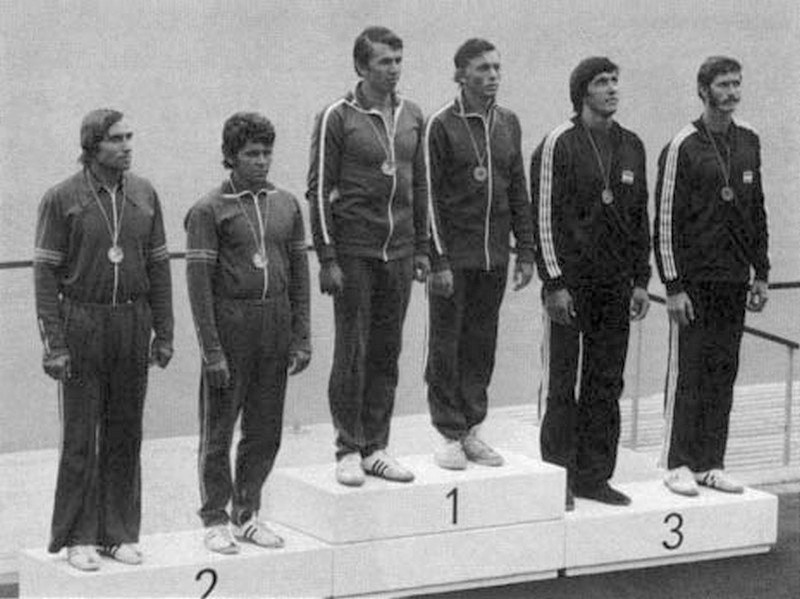
Left-right: Gheorghe Danielov, Gheorghe Simionov, Serhiy Petrenko, Aleksandr Vinogradov, Tamás Buday, Oszkár Frey

=== Heats ===
The 15 teams first raced in two heats on July 29. The top three finishers from each of the heats advanced directly to the semifinal and the remaining ten teams were relegated to the repechages.

Heat 1
1.	Jerzy Opara and Andrzej Gronowicz (POL)	3:52.58	QS
2.	Jiří Čtvrtčeka and Tomáš Šach (TCH)	3:54.06	QS
3.	Detlef Bothe and Hans-Jürgen Tode (GDR)	3:55.73	QS
4.	Ivan Burchin and Krasimir Khristov (BUL)	3:57.13	QR
5.	Hermann Glaser and Heinz Lucke (FRG)	3:57.41	QR
6.	Tiziano Annoni and Ilario Passerini (ITA)	3:59.60	QR
7.	Jeremy Abbott and John Edwards (CAN)	4:02.07	QR
8.	Roberto Altamirano and Juan Martínez (MEX)	4:38.91	QR
Heat 2
1.	Serhei Petrenko and Aleksandr Vinogradov (URS)	3:47.62	QS
2.	Gheorghe Danielov and Gheorghe Simionov (ROU)	3:48.57	QS
3.	Berndt Lindelöf and Eric Zeidlitz (SWE)	3:49.53	QS
4.	Alain Acart and Jean-Paul Cézard (FRA)	3:51.35	QR
5.	Tamás Buday and Oszkár Frey (HUN)	3:52.23	QR
6.	Mitsuhide Hata and Atsunobu Ogata (JPN)	4:05.78	QR
7.	Chuck Lyda and András Törő (USA)	4:21.19	QR

=== Repechages ===
Taking place on July 29, the top three finishers from each of the repechages advanced to the semifinals.

Repechage 1
1.	Tamás Buday and Oszkár Frey (HUN)	3:44.20	QS
2.	Ivan Burchin and Krasimir Khristov (BUL)	3:52.00	QS
3.	Tiziano Annoni and Ilario Passerini (ITA)	3:54.57	QS
4.	Roberto Altamirano and Juan Martínez (MEX)	3:59.04
5.	Chuck Lyda and András Törő (USA)	4:04.95
Repechage 2
1.	Hermann Glaser and Heinz Lucke (FRG)	3:50.68	QS
2.	Alain Acart and Jean-Paul Cézard (FRA)	3:51.71	QS
3.	Mitsuhide Hata and Atsunobu Ogata (JPN)	3:52.97	QS
4.	Jeremy Abbott and John Edwards (CAN)	3:54.33

=== Semifinals ===
Three semifinals were held on July 31. The top three finishers from each of the semifinals advanced to the final.

Semifinal 1
1.	Jerzy Opara and Andrzej Gronowicz (POL)	3:59.34	QF
2.	Berndt Lindelöf and Eric Zeidlitz (SWE)	4:00.26	QF
3.	Hermann Glaser and Heinz Lucke (FRG)	4:00.49	QF
4.	Tiziano Annoni and Ilario Passerini (ITA)	4:02.39
Semifinal 2
1.	Serhei Petrenko and Aleksandr Vinogradov (URS)	3:57.42	QF
2.	Detlef Bothe and Hans-Jürgen Tode (GDR)	3:58.26	QF
3.	Ivan Burchin and Krasimir Khristov (BUL)	3:58.74	QF
4.	Alain Acart and Jean-Paul Cézard (FRA)	3:59.80
Semifinal 3
1.	Gheorghe Danielov and Gheorghe Simionov (ROU)	3:55.12	QF
2.	Tamás Buday and Oszkár Frey (HUN)	3:55.43	QF
3.	Jiří Čtvrtčeka and Tomáš Šach (TCH)	4:12.24	QF
4.	Mitsuhide Hata and Atsunobu Ogata (JPN)	4:14.75

=== Final ===
The final was held on July 31.

Gold	Serhei Petrenko and Aleksandr Vinogradov (URS)	3:52.76
Silver	Gheorghe Danielov and Gheorghe Simionov (ROU)	3:54.28
Bronze	Tamás Buday and Oszkár Frey (HUN)	3:55.66
4.	Jerzy Opara and Andrzej Gronowicz (POL)	3:59.56
5.	Detlef Bothe and Hans-Jürgen Tode (GDR)	4:00.37
6.	Jiří Čtvrtečka and Tomáš Šach (TCH)	4:01.48
7.	Ivan Burchin and Krasimir Khristov (BUL)	4:02.44
8.	Hermann Glaser and Heinz Lucke (FRG)	4:03.86
9.	Berndt Lindelöf and Eric Zeidlitz (SWE)	4:07.84
