= Canoeing at the 1972 Summer Olympics – Men's C-2 1000 metres =

The men's C-2 1000 metres event was an open-style, pairs canoeing event conducted as part of the Canoeing at the 1972 Summer Olympics program.

== Medalists ==
| Gold | Silver | Bronze |
| Vladas Česiūnas and Yuri Lobanov (URS) | Ivan Patzaichin and Serghei Covaliov (ROU) | Fedia Damianov and Ivan Burtchin (BUL) |

== Results ==
=== Heats ===
The 16 teams first raced in two heats on September 5. The top three finishers from each of the heats advanced directly to the semifinals and the remaining ten teams were relegated to the repechages.

Heat 1
| 1. | Vladas Česiūnas and Yuri Lobanov (URS) | 4:07.73 | QS |
| 2. | Peter Hofmann and Hermann Glaser (FRG) | 4:08.89 | QS |
| 3. | John Wood and Scott Lee (CAN) | 4:12.35 | QS |
| 4. | Juan Martínez and Felipe Ojeda (MEX) | 4:13.94 | QR |
| 5. | Jan Żukowski and Andrzej Gronowicz (POL) | 4:27.94 | QR |
| 6. | Alain Acart and Gérald Delacroix (FRA) | 4:30.78 | QR |
| 7. | Mitsuhide Hata and Mitsuo Nakanishi (JPN) | 4:34.13 | QR |
| 8. | Daniel Sedji and Mathieu Koffi M'Broh (CIV) | 4:38.91 | QR |
Heat 2
| 1. | Ivan Patzaichin and Serghei Covaliov (ROU) | 4:09.21 | QS |
| 2. | Dirk Weise and Dieter Lichtenberg (GDR) | 4:12.95 | QS |
| 3. | Fedia Damianov and Ivan Burtchin (BUL) | 4:14.47 | QS |
| 4. | Berndt Lindelöf and Erik Zeidiltz (SWE) | 4:14.67 | QR |
| 5. | Miklós Darvas and Péter Povázsay (HUN) | 4:14.69 | QR |
| 6. | Roland Muhlen and Andreas Weigand (USA) | 4:16.50 | QR |
| 7. | Petr Mokrý and Karel Scheder (TCH) | 4:31.21 | QR |
| 8. | Lennart Mathiassen and Søren Boysen (DEN) | 4:39.50 | QR |

=== Repechages ===
Taking place on September 7, the top three finishers from each of the repechages advanced to the semifinals.

Repechage 1
| 1. | Miklós Darvas and Péter Povázsay (HUN) | 3:54.79 | QS |
| 2. | Petr Mokrý and Karel Scheder (TCH) | 3:56.19 | QS |
| 3. | Juan Martínez and Felipe Ojeda (MEX) | 3:58.20 | QS |
| 4. | Alain Acart and Gérald Delacroix (FRA) | 3:58.24 |
| 5. | Daniel Sedji and Mathieu Koffi M'Broh (CIV) | 4:25.59 |
Repechage 2
| 1. | Berndt Lindelöf and Erik Zeidiltz (SWE) | 4:01.42 | QS |
| 2. | Roland Muhlen and Andreas Weigand (USA) | 4:02.01 | QS |
| 3. | Jan Żukowski and Andrzej Gronowicz (POL) | 4:05.42 | QS |
| 4. | Lennart Mathiassen and Søren Boysen (DEN) | 4:06.30 |
| 5. | Mitsuhide Hata and Mitsuo Nakanishi (JPN) | 4:10.14 |

=== Semifinals ===
Three semifinals were held on September 8. The top three finishers from each of the semifinals advanced to the final.

Semifinal 1
| 1. | Vladas Česiūnas and Yuri Lobanov (URS) | 3:51.96 | QF |
| 2. | Berndt Lindelöf and Erik Zeidlitz (SWE) | 3:52.47 | QF |
| 3. | Fedia Damianov and Ivan Burtchin (BUL) | 3:53.72 | QF |
| 4. | Juan Martínez and Felipe Ojeda (MEX) | 3:56.71 |
Semifinal 2
| 1. | Ivan Patzaichin and Serghei Covaliov (ROU) | 3:51.43 | QF |
| 2. | Roland Muhlen and Andreas Weigand (USA) | 3:52.25 | QF |
| 3. | Petr Mokrý and Karel Scheder (TCH) | 3:53.15 | QF |
| 4. | John Wood and Scott Lee (CAN) | 4:02.67 |
Semifinal 3
| 1. | Dirk Weise and Dieter Lichtenberg (GDR) | 3:52.66 | QF |
| 2. | Peter Hoffmann and Hermann Glaser (FRG) | 3:53.54 | QF |
| 3. | Miklós Darvas and Péter Povázsay (HUN) | 3:59.73 | QF |
| 4. | Jan Żukowski and Andrzej Gronowicz (POL) | 4:01.40 |

=== Final ===
The final was held on September 9.

| Gold | Vladas Česiūnas and Yuri Lobanov (URS) | 3:52.60 |
| Silver | Ivan Patzaichin and Serghei Covaliov (ROU) | 3:52.63 |
| Bronze | Fedia Damianov and Ivan Burtchin (BUL) | 3:58.10 |
| 4. | Peter Hofmann and Hermann Glaser (FRG) | 3:59.24 |
| 5. | Miklós Darvas and Péter Povázsay (HUN) | 4:00.42 |
| 6. | Roland Muhlen and Andreas Weigand (USA) | 4:01.28 |
| 7. | Dirk Weise and Dieter Lichtenberg (GDR) | 4:01.50 |
| 8. | Berndt Lindelöf and Erik Zeidlitz (SWE) | 4:01.60 |
| 9. | Petr Mokrý and Karel Scheder (TCH) | 4:02.05 |

The Soviets took an early lead, but the Romanians mounted a charge at the 700 meter mark which came up 0.03 seconds short at the finish.
