= Canoeing at the 1972 Summer Olympics – Men's C-1 1000 metres =

The men's C-1 1000 metres event was an open-style, individual canoeing event conducted as part of the Canoeing at the 1972 Summer Olympics program.

== Medallists ==
Gold	Silver	Bronze
Ivan Patzaichin (ROU)	Tamás Wichmann (HUN)	Detlef Lewe (FRG)

== Results ==
=== Heats ===
Thirteen competitors were entered. Held on September 5, the top three in each heat move on to final with the others were relegated to the semifinal. Ivan Patzaichin broke his paddle and placed last in his heat. Yet he managed to finish the race, paddling with a peace of wood that he removed from the floor of his canoe, and was included to the repechage.

==== Heat 1 ====
Rank	Canoer	Country	Time	Notes
1.	Tamás Wichmann	Hungary	4:29.01	QF
2.	Boris Lyubenov	Bulgaria	4:32.03	QF
3.	Jerzy Opara	Poland	4:32.39	QF
4.	Roberto Altamirano	Mexico	4:34.52	QS
5.	András Törő	United States	4:39.92	QS
6.	Jiří Čtvrtečka	Czechoslovakia	4:54.56	QS
7.	John Wood	Canada	4:56.70	QS

==== Heat 2 ====
Rank	Canoer	Country	Time	Notes
1.	Detlef Lewe	West Germany	4:31.79	QF
2.	Vasiliy Yurchenko	Soviet Union	4:33.34	QF
3.	Dirk Weise	East Germany	4:41.04	QF
4.	Jean-François Millot	France	4:52.30	QS
5.	Tetsumasa Yamaguchi	Japan	4:53.66	QS
6.	Ivan Patzaichin	Romania	6:34.65	QS

=== Semifinal ===
Only the seven canoeists who did not advance from the first round competed in the semifinal. Taking place on September 8, the top three finishers advanced to the final.

Rank	Canoer	Country	Time	Notes
1.	Ivan Patzaichin	Romania	4:11.90	QF
2.	Jiří Čtvrtečka	Czechoslovakia	4:14.99	QF
3.	Roberto Altamirano	Mexico	4:15.24	QF
4.	Jean-François Millot	France	4:20.70	
5.	John Wood	Canada	4:24.40	
6.	András Törő	United States	4:25.23	
7.	Tetsumasa Yamaguchi	Japan	4:36.34	

=== Final ===
The final took place on September 9.

Rank	Canoer	Country	Time	Notes
1st place, gold medalist(s)	Ivan Patzaichin	Romania	4:08.94	
2nd place, silver medalist(s)	Tamás Wichmann	Hungary	4:12.42	
3rd place, bronze medalist(s)	Detlef Lewe	West Germany	4:13.63	
4.	Dirk Weise	East Germany	4:14.38	
5.	Vasiliy Yurchenko	Soviet Union	4:14.43	
6.	Boris Lyubenov	Bulgaria	4:14.65	
7.	Jiří Čtvrtečka	Czechoslovakia	4:14.98	
8.	Roberto Altamirano	Mexico	4:20.39	
9.	Jerzy Opara	Poland	4:21.05	
