= Kapf =

Kapf is a common local name, especially in the Alemannian area, for a mountain or hill with good views or a settlement on such a place. It may be related to Kopf, the German word for "head". In Switzerland, the variant Gupf is widespread.

Kapf may refer to:

- Kapf (Egenhausen) (625.4 m), in the Black Forest near Egenhausen, county of Calw, Baden-Württemberg, Germany
- Kapf (Oberegg AI), hamlet in the municipality of Oberegg AI, Appenzell Innerrhoden, Switzerland
- Kapf (Krinau), hamlet in the municipality of Krinau, Toggenburg, St. Gallen, Switzerland
- Roland Kapf (born 1937), German sprint canoer
- Naples Municipal Airport, Florida (by ICAO airport code)
