= Peter Hoffmann =

Peter Hoffmann may refer to:

- Peter Hoffmann (historian) (1930–2023), German Canadian professor of history
- Peter Hoffmann (racecar driver) (born 1939), German racer
- Peter Hoffmann (canoeist) (born 1941), German former sprint canoer
- Peter Hoffmann (chess composer) (born 1955), German chess composer
- Peter Hoffmann (runner) (born 1956), British athlete
- Peter M. Hoffman (died 1948), Illinois politician

== See also ==
- Peter Hofmann (1944–2010), German operatic tenor
- Peter Hofmann (handballer) (born 1955), former East German handball player
- Pete Hoffman (1919–2013), American cartoonist
- Peter Hovmand (born 1974), Danish writer
- Pieter Hofman (1640–1692), Flemish Baroque painter
