= Hermann Glaser =

Hermann Glaser may refer to:

- Hermann Glaser (canoeist) (born 1947), West German sprint canoer
- Hermann Glaser (cultural historian) (1928–2018), German cultural historian and commentator
