= Canoeing at the 1968 Summer Olympics – Men's C-1 1000 metres =

The men's C-1 1000 metres event was an open-style, individual canoeing event conducted as part of the Canoeing at the 1968 Summer Olympics program. Heat times were given in tenths of a second (0.1) while the semifinal and final events were given in hundredths of a second (0.01) in the official report.

== Medallists ==
Gold	Silver	Bronze
Tibor Tatai (HUN)	Detlef Lewe (FRG)	Vitaly Galkov (URS)

== Results ==
=== Heats ===
Twelve competitors were entered, but eleven took part. Held on October 22, the top three in each heat move on to final with the others relegated to the semifinal.

==== Heat 1 ====
Rank	Canoer	Country	Time	Notes
1.	Ivan Patzaichin	Romania	4:28.3	QF
2.	Ove Emanuelsson	Sweden	4:32.4	QF
3.	Christopher Hook	Canada	4:34.9	QF
4.	Vitaly Galkov	Soviet Union	4:35.4	QS
5.	Boris Lyubenov	Bulgaria	4:36.2	QS
6.	Félipe Ojeda	Mexico	4:47.3	QS

==== Heat 2 ====
Rank	Canoer	Country	Time	Notes
1.	Detlef Lewe	West Germany	4:24.5	QF
2.	Tibor Tatai	Hungary	4:25.5	QF
3.	Jiří Čtvrtečka	Czechoslovakia	4:28.3	QF
4.	Andreas Weigand	United States	4:30.0	QS
5.	Tetsumasa Yamaguchi	Japan	4:33.3	QS
-	Jürgen Harpke	East Germany	Did not start	

In the official report, Emanuelsson's first name is listed as Sten.

=== Semifinal ===
Only the five canoeists who did not advance from the first round competed in the semifinal. Taking place on October 24, the top three finishers advanced to the final.

Rank	Canoer	Country	Time	Notes
1.	Vitaly Galkov	Soviet Union	4:34.17	QF
2.	Boris Lyubenov	Bulgaria	4:35.82	QF
3.	Andreas Weigand	United States	4:37.11	QF
4.	Félipe Ojeda	Mexico	4:43.20	
5.	Tetsumasa Yamaguchi	Japan	4:54.61	

=== Final ===
The final took place on October 25.

Rank	Canoer	Country	Time	Notes
1st place, gold medalist(s)	Tibor Tatai	Hungary	4:36.14	
2nd place, silver medalist(s)	Detlef Lewe	West Germany	4:38.31	
3rd place, bronze medalist(s)	Vitaly Galkov	Soviet Union	4:40.42	
4.	Jiří Čtvrtečka	Czechoslovakia	4:40.74	
5.	Boris Lyubenov	Bulgaria	4:43.43	
6.	Ove Emanuelsson	Sweden	4:45.80	
7.	Ivan Patzaichin	Romania	4:49.32	
8.	Andreas Weigand	United States	4:50.42	
9.	Christopher Hook	Canada	4:55.88	

Tatai qualified as a reserve for the Hungarian team, but won decisively after driving the other finalists to exhaustion.
