= Lewandowski =

Lewandowski (Polish pronunciation: [lɛvanˈdɔfskʲi]; feminine Lewandowska) is a Polish-language surname. In other languages it may be transliterated as Lewandowsky, Levandovski, Levandovsky, Levandoski, etc.

In 2009 it was the seventh most common surname in Poland (93,404 people in 2009).

It is unlikely to be derived from the place name "Lewandów", because the surname was registered much earlier than the settlement was founded. It is associated with the name of the plant lavender. An early record of the surname is dated by 1908.

== People ==
=== Lewandowski ===
- Adolph J. Lewandowski (1905–1961), American football and basketball coach
- Corey Lewandowski (born 1973), American political consultant
- Edmund Lewandowski (1914–1998), American artist
- Eduard Lewandowski (born 1980), German ice hockey player
- Gina Lewandowski (born 1985), American soccer player
- Grzegorz Lewandowski (born 1969), Polish footballer
- Janusz Lewandowski (born 1951), Polish economist and politician
- Janusz Lewandowski (1931–2013), Polish diplomat
- Jozef Lewandowski (1923–2007), Polish-Swedish historian and writer
- Józef R. Lewandowski, Polish chemist
- Konrad T. Lewandowski (born 1966), Polish writer
- Louis Lewandowski (1821–1894), German composer
- Marcin Lewandowski (born 1987), Polish middle distance runner
- Mariusz Lewandowski (born 1979), Polish footballer
- Mateusz Lewandowski (born 1993), Polish footballer
- Michał Lewandowski (born 1996), Polish footballer
- Michel Lewandowski (1914–1990), French footballer
- Przemysław Lewandowski (born 1975) Polish rower
- Ricardo Lewandowski (born 1948), Minister of the Supreme Federal Court of Brazil
- Robert Lewandowski (born 1988), Polish footballer
- Sascha Lewandowski (1971–2016), German football manager
- Tadeusz Lewandowski (1944–2021), Polish right-wing politician
- Brothers Lewandowski, royal court merchants to the Bavarian court for lingerie

=== Levandowski ===
- Anthony Levandowski (born 1980), American engineer

=== Lewandowsky ===
- Max Lewandowsky (1876–1916), German neurologist
- Felix Lewandowsky (1879–1921), German dermatologist
- Stephan Lewandowsky (born 1958), Australian psychologist
- Via Lewandowsky (born 1963), German artist
- Klaus Lewandowsky (born 1937), West German sprint canoer

=== Lewandowska ===
- Anna Lewandowska (born 1988), Polish karateka, personal trainer and entrepreneur
- Iwona Lewandowska (born 1985), Polish athlete
- Janina Lewandowska (1908–1940), Polish pilot
- Sandra Lewandowska (born 1977), Polish politician
- Sylwia Lewandowska (born 1991), Polish rower

=== Other ===
- Mikhail Levandovsky (1890–1938), Soviet military leader
