= Hovmand =

Hovmand is a surname. Notable people with the surname include:

- Annelise Hovmand (1924–2016), Danish film director, screen director, and film producer
- Peter Hovmand (born 1974), Danish-Greenlandic writer and photographer, son of Svend
- Svend Erik Hovmand (born 1945), Danish politician, son of Annelise
