= Vodnik (disambiguation) =

Vodnik, or Vodnik Arkhangelsk, is a bandy club from Arkhangelsk in Russia.

Vodnik or Vodník may also refer to:

- Vodnik (sports society), a Soviet Voluntary Sports Society
- Vodník (poem), written by Antonín Dvořák in 1896
- Vodyanoy or Vodník, a male water spirit
- GAZ-3937 "Vodnik", a Russian high-mobility multipurpose military vehicle manufactured by GAZ
- Vodnik, the Croatian name for Vodnic village, Lupac Commune, Caraş-Severin County, Romania
- The rank denoting a current-day Sergeant in the Militia of the SFR Yugoslavia

== People with the surname ==
- Anton Vodnik (1901–1965), Slovene art historian, and critic
- Valentin Vodnik (1758–1819), Slovene priest, journalist and poet
- Victor Vodnik (born 1999), American baseball player
