= Detlef Bothe =

Detlef Bothe may refer to:

- Detlef Bothe (canoeist)
- Detlef Bothe (actor)
