= Helmut Wagner =

Helmut Wagner may refer to:

- Helmut Wagner (sociologist) (1904-1989), German educationalist and sociologist
- Helmut Wagner (Fallschirmjäger) (1915–1944), German Luftwaffe officer
- Helmut Wagner (athlete) (born 1945), East German sprint canoer
