= 1978 ICF Canoe Sprint World Championships =

International canoe event

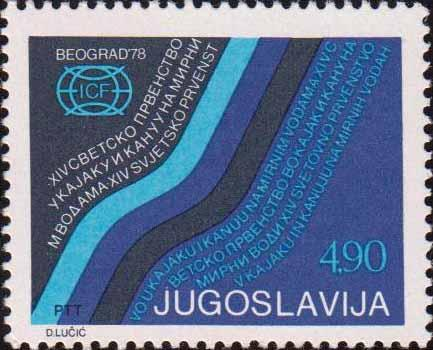
Yugoslav stamp dedicated to the 1978 ICF Canoe Sprint World Championships

The 1978 ICF Canoe Sprint World Championships were held in Belgrade, Yugoslavia for a record third time. The Yugoslavian (now Serbian) city had previously hosted the championships in 1971 and 1975.

The men's competition consisted of six Canadian (single paddle, open boat) and nine kayak events. Three events were held for the women, all in kayak.

This was the fourteenth championships in canoe sprint.

== Medal summary ==
=== Men's ===
==== Canoe ====
Event	Gold	Time	Silver	Time	Bronze	Time
C-1 500 m	Liubomir Ljubenov (BUL)		Gyula Hajdu (HUN)		Sergey Liminovich (URS)	
C-1 1000 m	Matija Ljubek (YUG)		Tamás Wichmann (HUN)		Ivan Patzaichin (ROU)	
C-1 10000 m	Ivan Patzaichin (ROU)		Vasiliy Yurchenko (URS)		Matija Ljubek (YUG)	
C-2 500 m	Hungary; László Foltán; István Vaskúti		Soviet Union; Sergey Petrenko; Petras Grigonis		Romania; Gheorghe Simionov; Toma Simionov	
C-2 1000 m	Hungary; Tamás Buday; Oszkár Frey		Romania; Gheorghe Simionov; Toma Simionov		Soviet Union; Sergey Postrechin; Yuri Lobanov	
C-2 10000 m	Hungary; Tamás Buday; László Vaskúti		Romania; Gheorghe Simionov; Toma Simionov		Soviet Union; Viktor Vorobiyev; Aleksandr Beleyi	

==== Kayak ====
Event	Gold	Time	Silver	Time	Bronze	Time
K-1 500 m	Vasile Dîba (ROU)		Vladimir Parfenovich (URS)		Peter Hempel (GDR)	
K-1 1000 m	Rüdiger Helm (GDR)		Milan Janić (YUG)		Vitaliy Trukshin (URS)	
K-1 10000 m	Milan Janić (YUG)		Nikolay Stepanenko (URS)		István Joós (HUN)	
K-2 500 m	East Germany; Bernd Olbricht; Rüdiger Helm		Romania; Nicușor Eșanu; Ion Bîrlădeanu		Soviet Union; Sergei Chukhray; Vladimir Tainikov	
K-2 1000 m	Soviet Union; Sergei Chukhray; Vladimir Tainikov		Norway; Einar Rasmussen; Olaf Søyland		Hungary; Zoltán Bakó; István Szabó	
K-2 10000 m	Hungary; Zoltán Bakó; István Szabó		France; Alain Lebas; Jean-Paul Hanquier		Romania; Nicușor Eșanu; Grigore Constantin	
K-4 500 m	East Germany; Peter Bischof; Bernd Duvigneau; Roland Graupner; Harald Marg		Spain; Herminio Menéndez; Martin Vázquez; José Ramón López; Luis Gregorio Ramos		Poland; Ryszard Oborski; Daniel Wełna; Grzegorz Kołtan; Grzegorz Śledziewski	
K-4 1000 m	East Germany; Bernd Olbricht; Bernd Duvigneau; Rüdiger Helm; Harald Marg		Romania; Nicușor Eșanu; Ion Bîrlădeanu; Mihai Zafiu; Alexandru Giura		Spain; Herminio Rodriguez; José María Esteban; José Ramón López; Luis Gregorio Ramos	
K-4 10000 m	Soviet Union; Aleksandr Shaparenko; Sergey Nikolskiy; Vladimir Morozov; Aleksandr Avdeyev		Poland; Andrzej Klimaszewski; Krzysztof Lepianka; Zbigniew Torzecki; Zdzisław Szubski		Romania; Cuprian Macarencu; Ciobann Marian; Stefan Popa; Nicolae Țicu	

=== Women's ===
==== Kayak ====
Event	Gold	Time	Silver	Time	Bronze	Time
K-1 500 m	Roswitha Eberl (GDR)		Olga Makarova (URS)		Maria Cosma (ROU)	
K-2 500 m	East Germany; Marion Rösiger; Martina Fischer		Soviet Union; Natalya Kalashinkova; Nina Doroh		Romania; Agafia Orlov; Natasia Nichitov	
K-4 500 m	East Germany; Marion Rösiger; Roswitha Eberl; Carsta Genäuß; Martina Fischer		Bulgaria; Vanja Gescheva; Maria Mintscheva; Natascha Janakieva; Iliana Nikolova		Romania; Agafia Orlov; Natasia Nichitov; Maria Nicolae; Nastasia Buri	

== Medals table ==
Rank	Nation	Gold	Silver	Bronze	Total
1	East Germany (GDR)	7	0	1	8
2	Hungary (HUN)	4	2	2	8
3	Soviet Union (URS)	2	6	5	13
4	Romania (ROU)	2	4	7	13
5	Yugoslavia (YUG)	2	1	1	4
6	Bulgaria (BUL)	1	1	0	2
7	Poland (POL)	0	1	1	2
7	Spain (ESP)	0	1	1	2
9	France (FRA)	0	1	0	1
9	Norway (NOR)	0	1	0	1
Totals (10 entries)		18	18	18	54
