= Administrative divisions of Lviv =

Divisions of Lviv, Ukraine

Administrative divisions of Lviv, Ukraine, include the formal administrative subdivision into raions (districts) and the more detailed informal subdivision into historical neighborhoods.

== Raions of Lviv ==
Lviv is divided into six raions (districts), each with its own administrative bodies:

- Halych district (ukr. Галицький район – Halytskyi raion)
- Railway district (ukr. Залізничний район – Zaliznychnyi raion)
  - Rudne (ukr. селище Рудне - selyshche Rudne)
- Lychakiv district (ukr. Личаківський район – Lychakivskyi raion)
  - Vynnyky (ukr. місто Винники - misto Vynnyky)
- Sykhiv district (ukr. Сихівський район – Sykhivskyi raion)
- Franko district (ukr. Франківський район – Frankivskyi raion)
- Shevchenko district (ukr. Шевченківський район – Shevchenkivskyi raion)
  - Briukhovychi (ukr. селище Брюховичі - selyshche Briukhovychi)
