= Valov =

Valov (masculine, Bulgarian: Вълов, Russian: Валов) or Valova (feminine, Bulgarian: Вълова, Russian: Валова) is a Slavic surname. Notable people with the surname include:

- Dimitar Valov (born 1949), Bulgarian rower
- Elena Valova (born 1963), Russian pair skater
- Jana Vaľová (born 1965), Slovak politician
- Iliya Valov (born 1961), Bulgarian footballer and manager
- Irma Valová (born 1965), Czech basketball player
- Ivan Valov (born 1941), Bulgarian sprint canoeist
- Lenka Valová (born 1983), Czech cyclist
- Lucie Valová (born 1981), Czech sport shooter
- Petko Valov (born 1966), Bulgarian Greek Catholic bishop
- Valya Valova-Demireva (born 1961), Bulgarian sprinter
