= Aleksandr Vinogradov (canoeist) =

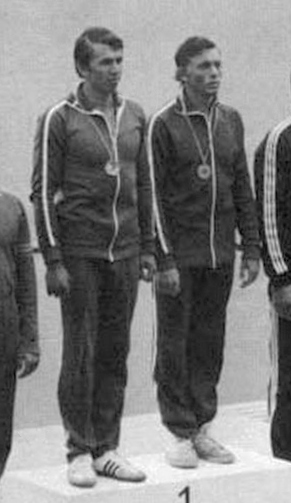
- Vinogradov (right) at the 1976 Olympics

Personal information
- Born: 10 November 1951 (age 75) Moscow, Soviet Union
- Height: 179 cm (5 ft 10 in)
- Weight: 80 kg (176 lb)

Sport
- Sport: Canoe sprint
- Club: Vodnik Moscow
- Coached by: Yuriy Vinogradov
Medal record
Representing the Soviet Union
Olympic Games
Gold medal – first place	1976 Montreal	C-2 500 m
Gold medal – first place	1976 Montreal	C-2 1000 m
World Championships
Gold medal – first place	1971 Belgrade	C-2 10000 m
Gold medal – first place	1974 Mexico City	C-2 500 m
Gold medal – first place	1975 Belgrade	C-2 500 m
Silver medal – second place	1979 Duisburg	C-2 500 m
Bronze medal – third place	1975 Belgrade	C-2 1000 m

Aleksandr Yurievich Vinogradov (Russian: Александр Юрьевич Виноградов, born 10 November 1951) is a retired Soviet sprint canoeist. He competed in doubles at the 1976 and 1980 Olympics and won two gold medals in 1976. He also won five medals at the ICF Canoe Sprint World Championships with three golds (C-2 500 m: 1974, 1975; C-2 10000 m: 1971), one silver (C-2 500 m: 1979, and one bronze (C-2 1000 m: 1975). He trained at VSS Vodnik and coached by his father Yuriy Vinogradov.
