= Marian (surname) =

Marian is a surname. Notable people with the surname include:

- Boris Marian (born 1934), Moldovan writer, translator, journalist and Soviet dissident
- Ciobann Marian, Romanian sprint canoeist
- Ferdinand Marian (1902–1946), Austrian actor
- Michèle Marian (born 1963), German actress
- Radu Marian (born 1977), Moldovan sopranist
- Simion Florea Marian (1847–1907), Romanian folklorist and ethnographer
- Victor Marian (born 1984), Moldovan footballer
- Viorica Marian, Moldovan-born American psychologist and professor
