= CSA Steaua București (canoe-kayak) =

Romanian canoe-kayak team

- Full name: Clubul Sportiv al Armatei Steaua București
- Nickname: Roș-Albaștrii (The Red and Blues)
- Short name: Steaua
- Founded: 1949; 77 years ago
- Based in: Bucharest, Romania
- Colors
- President: George Boroi
- Website: Club home page

The CSA Steaua București Canoe-Kayak section was created in 1949 and is one of the most successful canoe-kayak teams in Romania.

== European champions ==
Year	Category	Name
1961	K-2 500 m	Andrei Conțolenco, Nicolae Artimov
1963	K-1 4 x 500 m K-2 500 m K-2 1000 m	Vasilie Nicoară, Haralambie Ivanov
1965	C-1 10000 m	Andrei Igorov
1965	K-1 4 x 500 m K-2 500 m	Haralambie Ivanov, Vasilie Nicoară
1965	K-4 1000 m	Vasilie Nicoară, Haralambie Ivanov, Andrei Conțolenco, Nicolae Terente
1967	C-1 10000 m	Andrei Igorov
1967	K-1 4 x 500 m	Andrei Conțolenco, Haralambie Ivanov
1967	K-4 1000 m	Ion Irimia
1971	C-2 500 m	Gheorghe Danilov, Gheorghe Simionov
1971	K-4 10000 m	Costel Coșniță, Vasilie Simiocenco
1997	C-4 1000 m	Antonel Borșan
2001	C-2 200 m	Mikhail Vartolemei
2002	C-2 1000 m	Silviu Simioncencu
2004	C-4 500 m	Silviu Simioncencu, Petre Condrat
2004	C-4 1000 m	Petre Condrat
2005	C-4 500 m	Silviu Simioncencu
2006	C-4 500 m	Silviu Simioncencu, Gabriel Talpă

== World champions ==
Year	Category	Name
1963	K-1 4 x 500 m K-2 500 m K-2 1000 m	Vasilie Nicoară, Haralambie Ivanov
1971	K-4 10000 m	Costel Coșniță
1971	C-2 500 m	Gheorghe Danilov, Gheorghe Simionov
1971	K-4 10000 m	Vasilie Simiocenco
1974	K-1 4 x 500 m	Ernst Pavel
1974	K-2 10000 m	Ion Terente
1979	K-2 10000 m	Nicușor Eșanu, Ion Bîrlădeanu
1981	C-2 1000 m	Toma Simionov
1982	C-2 10000 m	Toma Simionov
1983	C-1 500 m	Costică Olaru
1983	C-2 1000 m	Toma Simionov
1983	K-4 1000 m	Ionel Constantin, Nicolae Feodosei, Ionel Lețcae, Angelin Velea
1986	C-1 1000 m C-1 10000 m	Aurel Macarencu
1986	K-2 1000 m	Daniel Stoian, Angelin Velea
1995	C-4 1000 m	Antonel Borșan
1997	C-4 1000 m	Antonel Borșan
2001	C-4 500 m	Mikhail Vartolemei
2002	C-4 500 m	Mikhail Vartolemei
2003	C-2 1000 m	Silviu Simioncencu
2003	C-4 500 m	Petre Condrat, Silviu Simioncencu
2005	C-4 500 m	Silviu Simioncencu

== Olympic champions ==
Year	Category	Name
1980	C-2 1000 m	Toma Simionov
1984	C-2 1000 m	Toma Simionov
1984	K-4 500 m	Agafia Constantin, Nastasia Ionescu, Tecla Marinescu
