= Oszkár Frey =

Hungarian canoeist (born 1953)

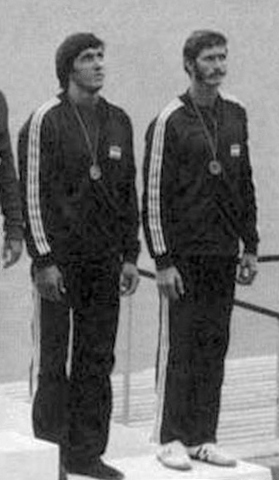
- Tamás Buday and Frey (right) at the 1976 Olympics

Personal information
- Born: 22 April 1953 (age 73) Budapest, Hungary
- Height: 190 cm (6 ft 3 in)
- Weight: 80 kg (176 lb)

Sport
- Sport: Canoe sprint
- Club: Honvéd Budapest; BSE Budapest
Medal record
Representing Hungary
Olympic Games
Bronze medal – third place	1976 Montreal	C-2 500 m
Bronze medal – third place	1976 Montreal	C-2 1000 m
World Championships
Gold medal – first place	1978 Belgrade	C-2 1000 m
Silver medal – second place	1975 Belgrade	C-2 10000 m
Silver medal – second place	1977 Sofia	C-2 1000 m
Silver medal – second place	1979 Duisburg	C-2 1000 m

Oszkár Frey (born 22 April 1953) is a retired Hungarian canoe sprinter who competed in doubles together with Tamás Buday. They won two bronze medals at the 1976 Olympics and one gold and three silver medals at the ICF Canoe Sprint World Championships.
