= Astapkovich =

Astapkovich (Belarusian: Астапковіч) is a Belarusian surname. Notable people with the surname include:

- Igor Astapkovich (born 1963), Belarusian hammer thrower
- Nikolay Astapkovich (1954–2000), Belarusian and Soviet sprint canoeist
