= Vladas Česiūnas =

Lithuanian canoe racer (1940–2023)

Medal record

Representing the Soviet Union

Men's canoe sprint

Olympic Games
Gold medal – first place	1972 Munich	C-2 1000 m

World Championships
Gold medal – first place	1973 Tampere	C-2 10000 m
Gold medal – first place	1974 Mexico City	C-2 1000 m
Gold medal – first place	1974 Mexico City	C-2 10000 m
Gold medal – first place	1975 Belgrade	C-2 10000 m
Silver medal – second place	1973 Tampere	C-2 1000 m
Bronze medal – third place	1971 Belgrade	C-1 1000 m

Vladislovas Česiūnas (15 March 1940 – 16 January 2023) was a Lithuanian sprint canoeist who competed in the early 1970s, representing the Soviet Union. He won one Olympic medal and six ICF Canoe Sprint World Championships medals during his career. He later became known for his role in "The Česiūnas Affair" when he defected from the 1979 ICF Canoe Sprint World Championships in Duisburg, West Germany only to return to the Soviet Union afterward for his "misconduct".

== Sporting career ==
At the 1972 Summer Olympics in Munich, Česiūnas won gold in the C-2 1000 m with Yuri Lobanov. He also won six canoe sprint world championship medals with four golds (C-2 1000 m: 1974, C-2 10000 m: 1973, 1974, 1975), one silver (C-2 1000 m: 1973), and one bronze (C-1 1000 m: 1971).

== The Česiūnas Affair ==
At the 1979 canoe sprint World Championships in Duisburg, West Germany, Česiūnas attended the event as a spectator. During the event he vanished, the first in a series of defections that would later include principal ballet dancers Alexander Godunov, Leonid Kozlov and Valentina Kozlov, and figure skaters Oleg Protopopov and Ludmila Belousova.

However, while he was studying German in Dortmund, KGB agents allegedly swooped in and took Česiūnas back to the Soviet Union.

The Soviets claimed that Česiūnas had met a woman named Ursula Vorkhert who invited to spend the night with him and then drugged him up. Česiūnas later appeared with anti-Communist Lithuanians and was asked to speak out in favor of a boycott of the 1980 Summer Olympics in Moscow, two months before the Soviet's invasion of Afghanistan and almost six months before American President Jimmy Carter's actual boycott of the 1980 Summer Olympics.

Česiūnas made his way to the Soviet Embassy in Bonn—"not without incident" and returned to the Soviet Union and imprisoned with a fractured skull according to Kurt Rebmann, West Germany's chief federal public prosecutor in 1979. Another reason the Soviets were concerned also had to do with a possible book Česiūnas had planned to publish on doping in the Soviet Union prior to the 1980 Summer Olympics. The Soviets later toned down their rhetoric on the incident, stating Česiūnas had "got into dubious company" while the West Germans continued to maintain he had been kidnapped.

In 2002, telephone interview with the Los Angeles Times, Česiūnas stated he returned from West Germany voluntarily but was threatened by Soviet officials with fifteen years of hard labor in a coal mine for his defection and was not imprisoned only due to the upcoming Summer Olympics in Moscow. As a result, Česiūnas was demoted from his customs agent position to being a civilian coach at a children's sports school which paid only a third of the salary of his customs position.

== Later life ==
Česiūnas earned two presidential decrees from Lithuania after the breakup of the Soviet Union in 1991. They were the Order of the Cross of Vytis ("Cross of the Knight") and the Commemorative Medal of 13 January. In 2000, Česiūnas was informed that Vorkhert, whom he met in Lithuania in 1998 after the country's 1991 independence, had died at 75. Česiūnas later returned to his customs position, becoming head of shifts for Lithuanian customs as of 2002. He also received monthly pensions from the Soviet and Lithuanian Olympic Committee of US$30 and US$120, respectively.

== See also ==
- List of Eastern Bloc defectors
