= Mokrý =

Mokrý or Mokry is a Slavic surname literally meaning "wet". Notable people with this surname include:

- Grzegorz Mokry (born 1985), Polish football manager
- Petr Mokrý (born 1948), Czech sprint canoer
