= Scott Lee =

Scott Lee may refer to:

- Scott Lee (canoeist) (born 1949), Canadian canoeist
- Scott Lee (footballer) (born 1963), Australian rules footballer
- Scott Lee (actor) known for Dawn at Socorro (1954), The Kid from Amarillo (1951), and Wild Horse Ambush (1952)
- Jason Scott Lee (born 1966), American actor
- Lisa Scott-Lee (born 1975), Welsh singer
- Andy Scott-Lee (born 1980), Welsh singer
