= Canoeing at the 1968 Summer Olympics – Men's C-2 1000 metres =

The men's C-2 1000 metres event was an open-style, pairs canoeing event conducted as part of the Canoeing at the 1968 Summer Olympics program. In the official report, heat times were shown in tenths of a second (0.1) while semifinal and final events were shown in hundredths of a second (0.01).

== Medalists ==
Gold	Silver	Bronze
Ivan Patzaichin and Serghei Covaliov (ROU)	Tamás Wichmann and Gyula Petrikovics (HUN)	Naum Prokupets and Mikhail Zamotin (URS)

== Results ==
=== Heats ===
The 13 teams first raced in two heats on October 22. One team was disqualified during the heats. The top three finishers from each of the heats advanced directly to the final and the remaining six teams were relegated to the semifinal.

Heat 1
1.	Naum Prokupets and Mikhail Zamotin (URS)	4:09.9	QF
2.	Berndt Lindelöf and Erik Zeidlitz (SWE)	4:10.5	QF
3.	Roland Kapf and Klaus Lewandowsky (FRG)	4:11.4	QF
4.	Juan Martínez and Felix Altamirano (MEX)	4:11.9	QS
5.	Bernard Bouffinier and Jean-François Millot (FRA)	4:13.1	QS
6.	Rudolf Pěnkava and Svatopluk Skarupský (TCH)	4:31.3	QS
7.	William Gates and Malcolm Hickox (USA)	4:37.0	QS
Heat 2
1.	Ivan Patzaichin and Serghei Covaliov (ROU)	4:03.4	QF
2.	Tamás Wichmann and Gyula Petrikovics (HUN)	4:04.4	QF
3.	Jürgen Harpke and Helmut Wagner (GDR)	4:21.8	QF
4.	Ivan Valov and Aleksandar Damyanov (BUL)	4:26.1	QS
5.	Tetsumasa Yamaguchi and Nobuatsu Yoshino (JPN)	4:30.9	QS
-	John Wood and Scott Lee (CAN)	DISQ

Canada was in fifth place halfway through the 2nd heat, but was disqualified in the official report for reasons not disclosed.

=== Semifinal ===
The top three finishers in the semifinal (raced on October 24) advanced to the final.

1.	Juan Martínez and Felix Altamirano (MEX)	4:15.01	QF
2.	Rudolf Pěnkava and Svatopluk Skarupský (TCH)	4:20.19	QF
3.	Ivan Valov and Aleksandar Damyanov (BUL)	4:22.17	QF
4.	Bernard Bouffinier and Jean-François Millot (FRA)	4:22.76
5.	Tetsumasa Yamaguchi and Nobuatsu Yoshino (JPN)	4:29.54
6.	William Gates and Malcolm Hickox (USA)	4:33.49

=== Final ===
The final was held on October 25.

Gold	Ivan Patzaichin and Serghei Covaliov (ROU)	4:07.18
Silver	Tamás Wichmann and Gyula Petrikovics (HUN)	4:08.77
Bronze	Naum Prokupets and Mikhail Zamotin (URS)	4:11.30
4.	Juan Martínez and Felix Altamirano (MEX)	4:15.24
5.	Berndt Lindelöf and Erik Zeidlitz (SWE)	4:16.60
6.	Jürgen Harpke and Helmut Wagner (GDR)	4:22.53
7.	Roland Kapf and Klaus Lewandowsky (FRG)	4:26.36
8.	Ivan Valov and Aleksandar Damyanov (BUL)	4:26.74
-	Rudolf Pěnkava and Svatopluk Skarupský (TCH)	DISQ

Czechoslovakia was sixth at the halfway mark in the official report, but was disqualified for reasons not disclosed.
