= Matysiak =

Matysiak is a Polish surname. Notable people with this surname include:

- Andrzej Matysiak (1948–2025), Polish sprint canoeist
- Bartłomiej Matysiak (born 1984), Polish cyclist
- Paulina Matysiak (born 1984), Polish politician
- Matysiak family, Polish Matysiakowie is a Polish radio drama, since 1956.
