= Tetsumasa =

- Gender: Male

Origin
- Origin: Japanese
- Meaning: Different meanings depending on the kanji used

Tetsumasa (written: 哲昌 or 徹正) is a masculine Japanese given name. Notable people with the name include:

- Tetsumasa Kimura (木村 哲昌; born 1972), Japanese footballer
- Tetsumasa Yamaguchi (山口 徹正; born 1947), Japanese sprint canoeist
