= Mathieu Koffi M'Broh =

Ivorian canoeist

Matheiu Koffi M'Broh (11 October 1949 – 26 February 2012) was an Ivorian sprint canoer who competed in the early 1970s. He was eliminated in the repechages of the C-2 1000 m event at the 1972 Summer Olympics in Munich.
