= Tiziano Annoni =

Italian sprint canoer (born 1955)

- Born: 20 August 1955 (age 70)
- Occupation: Italian sprint canoer

Tiziano Annoni (born 20 August 1955) is an Italian sprint canoer who competed in the mid-1970s. At the 1976 Summer Olympics in Montreal, paired with Ilario Passerini, he was eliminated in the repechages of the C-2 500 m and the semifinals of the C-2 1000 m event.
