= Svatopluk Skarupský =

Czech sprint canoer (born 1947)

Svatopluk Skarupský (born 29 January 1947) is a Czech sprint canoer who competed for Czechoslovakia in the late 1960s. He was disqualified in the final of the C-2 1000 m event at the 1968 Summer Olympics in Mexico City for crossing the track.
