= Atsunobu Ogata =

Japanese canoeist

Atsunobu Ogata (緒方厚信, Ogata Atsunobu) (born July 23, 1948) is a Japanese sprint canoer who competed in the mid-1970s. At the 1976 Summer Olympics in Montreal, he was eliminated in the repechages of the C-1 500 m, while, paired with Mitsuhide Hata, eliminated in the semifinals of the C-2 1000 m events, and disqualified in the repechages of the C-2 500 m.
