= 1974 ICF Canoe Sprint World Championships =

International canoe event

The 1974 ICF Canoe Sprint World Championships were held in Mexico City, Mexico in neighboring Xochimilco. This marked the first time the championships took place outside Europe. As of 2009, all championships have taken place either in Europe or North America. The lake was where the canoeing and rowing events took place for the 1968 Summer Olympics.

The men's competition consisted of six Canadian (single paddle, open boat) and nine kayak events. Three events were held for the women, all in kayak.

This was the eleventh championships in canoe sprint.

== Medal summary ==
=== Men's ===
==== Canoe ====
Event	Gold	Time	Silver	Time	Bronze	Time
C-1 500 m	Sergey Petrenko (URS)		Klaus Zeisler (GDR)		Ivan Patzaichin (ROU)	
C-1 1000 m	Vasiliy Yurchenko (URS)		Klaus Zeisler (GDR)		Ivan Patzaichin (ROU)	
C-1 10000 m	Tamás Wichmann (HUN)		Vasiliy Yurchenko (URS)		Ivan Patzaichin (ROU)	
C-2 500 m	Soviet Union; Aleksandr Vinogradov; Yuri Lobanov		Romania; Gheorghe Danielov; Gheorghe Simionov		Czechoslovakia; Tomáš Šach; Jiří Čtvrtečka	
C-2 1000 m	Soviet Union; Vladas Česiūnas; Yuri Lobanov		Poland; Jerzy Opara; Andrzej Gronowicz		Romania; Cherasim Munteanu; Vasile Serghei	
C-2 10000 m	Soviet Union; Vladas Česiūnas; Yuri Lobanov		Hungary; Tamás Buday; Gábor Haraszti		France; Alain Alcard; Jean-Paul Cézard	

==== Kayak ====
Event	Gold	Time	Silver	Time	Bronze	Time
K-1 500 m	Vasile Dîba (ROU)		Géza Csapó (HUN)		Grzegorz Śledziewski (POL)	
K-1 1000 m	Géza Csapó (HUN)		Grzegorz Śledziewski (POL)		Oreste Perri (ITA)	
K-1 10000 m	Oreste Perri (ITA)		Aleksandr Shaparenko (URS)		Péter Völgyi (HUN)	
K-1 4 x 500 m relay	Romania; Vasile Dîba; Ernst Pavel; Atanase Sciotnic; Mihai Zafiu		Soviet Union; Vitaliy Trukshin; Sergei Chukhray; Anatoliy Kobrisev; Nikolay Astapkovich		Poland; Ryszard Oborski; Grzegorz Śledziewski; Kazimierz Górecki; Andrzej Matysiak	
K-2 500 m	Poland; Ryszard Oborski; Grzegorz Śledziewski		Hungary; József Deme; János Rátkai		East Germany; Ulrich Hellige; Herbert Laabs	
K-2 1000 m	Hungary; Zoltán Bakó; István Szabó		Soviet Union; Vladimir Kozubin; Mikhail Afansiyev		East Germany; Volkmar Thiede; Rüdiger Helm	
K-2 10000 m	Romania; Ion Terente; Antrop Variabev		Belgium; Jos Broekx; Paul Stinckens		Soviet Union; Konstantin Kostenko; Vyacheslav Kononov	
K-4 1000 m	East Germany; Herbert Laabs; Ulrich Hellige; Jürgen Lehnert; Bernd Duvigneau		Soviet Union; Yuri Filatov; Aleksandr Degtyarov; Aleksandr Kuprikov; Nikolay Astapkovich		Hungary; József Deme; János Rátkai; Csongor Vargha; Csaba Giczy	
K-4 10000 m	Soviet Union; Leonid Derevyanko; Nikolai Gorbachev; Pytor Zhurga; Anatoliy Zharkin		Hungary; Csaba Giczy; Csongor Vargha; István Szabó; Zoltán Romhanyi		Poland; Ryszard Oborski; Kazimierz Górecki; Grzegorz Kołtan; Andrzej Matysiak	

=== Women's ===
==== Kayak ====
Event	Gold	Time	Silver	Time	Bronze	Time
K-1 500 m	Anke Ohde (GDR)		Nina Gopova (URS)		Maria Cosma (ROU)	
K-2 500 m	East Germany; Bärbel Köster; Anke Ohde		Romania; Victoria Dumitru; Maria Nichiforov		Hungary; Ilona Tőzsér; Mária Zakariás	
K-4 500 m	East Germany; Ilse Kaschube; Bärbel Köster; Anke Ohde; Carola Zirzow		Soviet Union; Nina Gopova; Larissa Kabakova; Tatyana Korzhunova; Galina Kreft		Romania; Victoria Dumitru; Maria Nichiforov; Maria Cosma; Agafia Orlov	

== Medals table ==
Rank	Nation	Gold	Silver	Bronze	Total
1	Soviet Union	6	7	1	14
2	East Germany	4	2	2	8
3	Hungary	3	4	3	10
4	Romania	3	2	6	11
5	Poland	1	2	3	6
6	Italy	1	0	1	2
7	Belgium	0	1	0	1
8	Czechoslovakia	0	0	1	1
8	France	0	0	1	1
Totals (9 entries)		18	18	18	54
