= Krasimir Khristov =

Bulgarian canoeist

Krasimir Khristov (Bulgarian: Красимир Христов; born 25 February 1953) is a Bulgarian sprint canoeist who competed in the mid-1970s. At the 1976 Summer Olympics in Montreal, he finished sixth in the C-2 500 m event and finished seventh in the C-2 1000 m event.
