= Grzegorz Śledziewski =

Polish sprint canoeist (born 1950)

Medal record

Men's canoe sprint

World Championships
Gold medal – first place	1971 Belgrade	K-1 1000 m
Gold medal – first place	1974 Mexico City	K-2 500 m
Gold medal – first place	1975 Belgrade	K-1 1000 m
Silver medal – second place	1970 Copenhagen	K-1 500 m
Silver medal – second place	1973 Tampere	K-1 1000 m
Silver medal – second place	1974 Mexico City	K-1 1000 m
Silver medal – second place	1977 Sofia	K-1 500 m
Silver medal – second place	1979 Duisburg	K-4 1000 m
Bronze medal – third place	1970 Copenhagen	K-1 1000 m
Bronze medal – third place	1973 Tampere	K-1 500 m
Bronze medal – third place	1974 Mexico City	K-1 500 m
Bronze medal – third place	1974 Mexico City	K-1 4 x 500 m
Bronze medal – third place	1975 Belgrade	K-1 500 m
Bronze medal – third place	1978 Belgrade	K-4 500 m
Bronze medal – third place	1979 Duisburg	K-4 500 m

Grzegorz Śledziewski (born 18 July 1950) is a Polish sprint canoeist who competed from the early 1970s to the early 1980s. He won fifteen medals at the ICF Canoe Sprint World Championships with three golds (K-1 1000 m: 1971, 1975 (tied with Italy's Oreste Perri); K-2 500 m: 1974), five silvers (K-1 500 m: 1970, 1977; K-1 1000 m: 1973, 1974; K-4 1000 m: 1979), and seven bronzes (K-1 500 m: 1973, 1974, 1975; K-1 1000 m: 1970, K-1 4 x 500 m: 1974, K-4 500 m: 1978, 1979).

Śledziewski also competed in three Summer Olympics, earning his best finish of fourth in the K-4 1000 m event at Moscow in 1980.

Olympic Games
Preceded by Waldemar Baszanowski	Flagbearer for Poland; 1976 Montreal	Succeeded by Czesław Kwieciński
