= Mitsuhide Hata =

Japanese canoeist

Mitsuhide Hata (畑 満秀, Hata Mitsuhide; born April 23, 1948) is a Japanese sprint canoer who competed in the early to mid-1970s. He was eliminated in the repechages of the C-2 1000 m event at the 1972 Summer Olympics in Munich. Four years later in Montreal, paired with Atsunobu Ogata, Hata was eliminated in the semifinals of the C-2 1000 m event while being disqualified in the repechages of the C-2 500 m event.
