= Vladimir Kozubin =

Medal record

Men's canoe sprint

World Championships
Silver medal – second place	1974 Mexico City	K-2 1000 m

Vladimir Kozubin (Russian: Владимир Козубин; born 11 October 1953) is a Soviet sprint canoeist who competed in the mid-1970s. He won a silver medal in the K-2 1000 m event at the 1974 ICF Canoe Sprint World Championships in Mexico City.
