= Ulrich Hellige =

East German canoeist

Medal record

Men's canoe sprint

World Championships
Gold medal – first place	1974 Mexico City	K-4 1000 m
Bronze medal – third place	1974 Mexico City	K-2 500 m

Ulrich Hellige is an East German sprint canoer who competed in the mid-1970s. He won a gold medal in the K-4 1000 m event at the 1974 ICF Canoe Sprint World Championships in Mexico City.
