= Sergey Liminovich =

Medal record

Men's canoe sprint

World Championships
Bronze medal – third place	1978 Belgrade	C-1 500 m

Sergeiy Liminovich is a Soviet sprint canoer who competed in the late 1970s. He won a bronze medal in the C-1 500 m event at the 1978 ICF Canoe Sprint World Championships in Belgrade.
