= Hans-Jürgen Tode =

East German sprint canoer

Hans-Jürgen Tode (born 23 December 1957) is an East German sprint canoer who competed in the mid-1970s. At the 1976 Summer Olympics in Montreal, paired alongside Detlef Bothe, he finished fifth in the C-2 1000 m event while being eliminated in the semifinals of the C-2 500 m event.
