= Gregory Smith (canoeist) =

Canadian sprint canoer (born 1956)

Personal information
- Born: November 29, 1956 (age 69) Brantford, Ontario, Canada
Medal record
Men's canoe sprint
World Championships
Silver medal – second place	1977 Sofia	C-2 500 m

Gregg Smith (born November 29, 1956) is a former Canadian sprint canoer who competed in the late 1970s. He won a silver medal in the C-2 500 m event at the 1977 ICF Canoe Sprint World Championships in Sofia.

Smith also finished seventh in the C-2 500 m event at the 1976 Summer Olympics in Montreal, Quebec, Canada.
