= Lennart Mathiasen =

Danish sprint canoer (born 1948)

Personal information
- Nationality: Danish
- Born: Copenhagen, Denmark
- Height: 185 cm (6 ft 1 in)
- Weight: 80 kg (176 lb)

Sport
- Country: Denmark
- Sport: Sprint Canoeing
- Club: Lyngby Kanoklub

Lennart Mathiasen (born 11 April 1948) is a Danish sprint canoeist who competed in the early 1970s. He was eliminated in the repechages of the C-2 1000 m event at the 1972 Summer Olympics in Munich.
