= Serhiy Petrenko =

Ukrainian canoeist (born 1956)

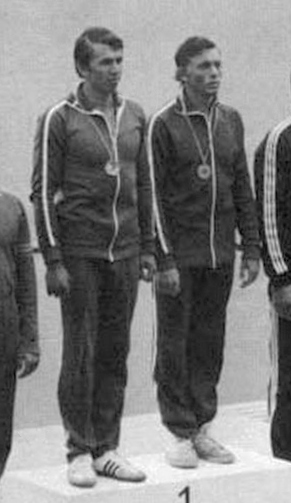
- Petrenko (left) at the 1976 Olympics

Personal information
- Born: December 8, 1956 (age 69) Khmelnytskyi, Ukrainian SSR, Soviet Union
- Height: 183 cm (6 ft 0 in)
- Weight: 80 kg (176 lb)

Sport
- Sport: Canoe sprint
- Club: Lokomotiv Odessa
Medal record
Representing the Soviet Union
Olympic Games
Gold medal – first place	1976 Montreal	C-2 500 m
Gold medal – first place	1976 Montreal	C-2 1000 m
World Championships
Gold medal – first place	1974 Mexico City	C-1 500 m
Gold medal – first place	1975 Belgrade	C-1 500 m
Gold medal – first place	1977 Sofia	C-2 10000 m
Silver medal – second place	1978 Belgrade	C-2 500 m
Silver medal – second place	1979 Duisburg	C-2 500 m
Silver medal – second place	1982 Belgrade	C-2 500 m
Bronze medal – third place	1983 Tampere	C-2 10000 m

Serhiy Volodymyrovych Petrenko (Ukrainian: Сергій Володимирович Петренко; born 8 December 1956) is a retired Soviet and Ukrainian sprint canoeist. He competed in doubles at the 1976 and 1980 Olympics and won two gold medals in 1976. He also won seven medals at the ICF Canoe Sprint World Championships with three golds (C-1 500 m: 1974, 1975; C-2 10000 m: 1977), three silvers (C-1 500 m: 1978, 1979; C-2 500 m: 1982), and one bronze (C-2 10000 m: 1983).
