= Dieter Lichtenberg =

East German sprint canoer (born 1949)

Dieter Lichtenberg (born 4 February 1949) is an East German sprint canoer who competed in the early 1970s. Paired alongside Dirk Weise, he finished seventh in the C-2 1000 m event at the 1972 Summer Olympics in Munich.
