= Karel Scheder =

Czechoslovak sprint canoer (born 1950)

Karel Scheder (born 13 May 1950) is a Czechoslovak sprint canoeist who competed in the early 1970s. He finished ninth in the C-2 1000 m event at the 1972 Summer Olympics in Munich.
