= Nobuatsu Yoshino =

Japanese canoeist (born 1940)

Nobuatsu Yoshino (吉野 伸篤, Yoshino Nobuatsu) (born August 20, 1940) is a Japanese sprint canoer who competed in the late 1960s. He was eliminated in the semifinals of the C-2 1000 metre event at the 1968 Summer Olympics in Mexico City.
