= Valeriy Zhemeza =

Soviet sprint canoer

Medal record

Men's canoe sprint

World Championships
Bronze medal – third place	1975 Belgrade	K-2 10000 m

Valeriy Zhemeza is a Soviet sprint canoer who competed in the mid-1970s. He won a bronze medal in the K-2 10000 m event at the 1975 ICF Canoe Sprint World Championships in Belgrade.
