= Dirk Weise =

East German sprint canoer (born 1952)

Dirk Weise (born 4 February 1952) is an East German sprint canoer who competed in the early 1970s. At the 1972 Summer Olympics in Munich, he finished fourth in the C-1 1000 m event and seventh, alongside Dieter Lichtenberg, in the C-2 1000 m event.
