= Pytor Grigonis =

Soviet sprint canoer

Medal record

Men's canoe sprint

World Championships
Silver medal – second place	1978 Belgrade	C-2 500 m

Pytor Grigonis is a Soviet sprint canoer who competed in the late 1970s. He won a silver medal in the C-2 500 m event at the 1978 ICF Canoe Sprint World Championships in Belgrade.
