= Vitaly Galkov =

Medal record

Men's canoe sprint

Olympic Games
Bronze medal – third place	1968 Mexico City	C-1 1000 m

World Championships
Silver medal – second place	1963 Jajce	C-2 1000 m

Vitaly Aleksandrovich Galkov (Russian: Виталий Александрович Галков; May 26, 1939 in Tambov – April 7, 1998 in Moscow) was a Soviet-born Russian sprint canoer who competed in the 1960s. He won the bronze medal in the C-1 1000 m event at the 1968 Summer Olympics in Mexico City.

Galkov also won a silver medal in the C-2 1000 m event at the 1963 ICF Canoe Sprint World Championships in Jajce.
