= Stefan Iliev =

Bulgarian sprint canoer

Medal record

Men's canoe sprint

World Championships
Bronze medal – third place	1975 Belgrade	C-2 10000 m

Stefan Iliev (Bulgarian: Стефан Илиев) is a Bulgarian sprint canoer who competed in the 1970s. He won a bronze medal in the C-2 10000 m event at the 1975 ICF Canoe Sprint World Championships in Belgrade.
