= Daniel Sedji =

Ivorian sprint canoer

Daniel Sedji (born 15 April 1927) is an Ivorian sprint canoer who competed in the early 1970s. He was eliminated in the repechages of the C-2 1000 m event at the 1972 Summer Olympics in Munich.
