= Grigore Constantin =

Romanian sprint canoer

Medal record

Men's canoe sprint

World Championships
Bronze medal – third place	1978 Belgrade	K-2 10000 m

Grigore Constantin is a Romanian sprint canoer who competed in the late 1970s. He won a bronze medal in the K-2 10000 m event at the 1978 ICF Canoe Sprint World Championships in Belgrade.
