= Aleksandar Damyanov =

Bulgarian sprint canoer (born 1943)

Aleksandar Damyanov (Bulgarian: Александър Дамянов) (born February 25, 1943) is a Bulgarian sprint canoer who competed in the late 1960s. He finished eighth in the C-2 1000 m event at the 1968 Summer Olympics in Mexico City.
