= Zaliznychnyi District, Lviv =

Coordinates: 49.8314°N 23.9578°E

Zaliznychnyi District Залізничний район
- Urban district in Lviv
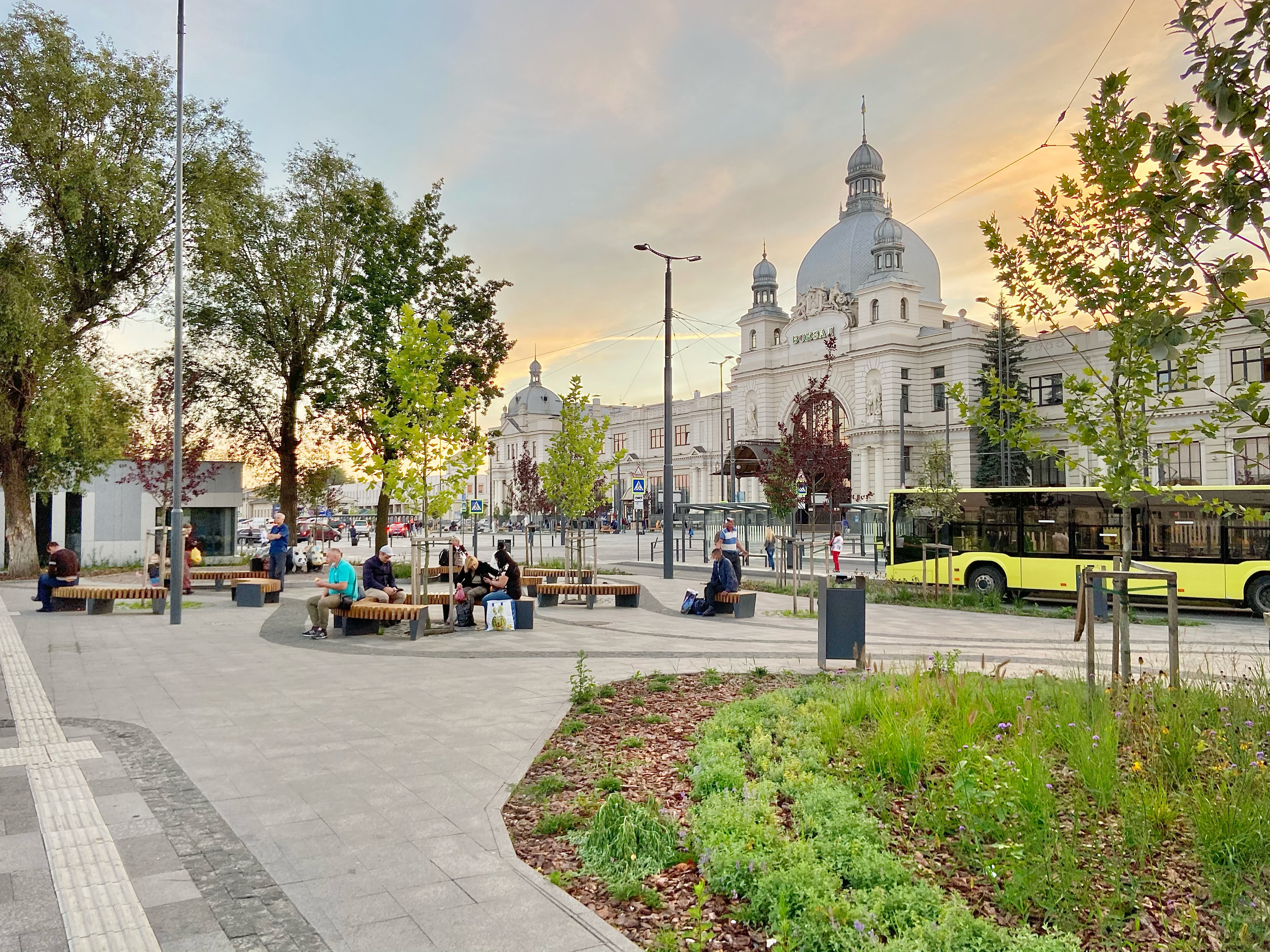
- Lviv railway station

- Map of Lviv and its districts with Zaliznychnyi highlighted in red.
- Country: Ukraine
- Oblast: Lviv Oblast

Population
  - Total: 124,730
- Time zone: EET

Zaliznychnyi District (Ukrainian: Залізничний район) is an urban district of the city of Lviv, named after the Lviv railway station (залізниця, zaliznytsia means railway). This district covers western part of the city. It contains such neighborhoods as Bilohorshcha, Levandivka and Sknylivok. Lviv International Airport is also situated in this district.

== Name ==
The district emerged on the site of the former "Kraków neighbourhood" of Lviv. Zaliznychnyi District is one of the two districts of Lviv, along with Shevchenkivskyi, whose names have not been changed since Soviet times. Its name is derived from the fact that the includes the main railway station and its vicinity. The workers of the Lviv railway have historically lived mostly in Levandivka, which lies within the district.

== Historical areas ==
=== Levandivka ===
The district of Levandivka is separated from the rest of Lviv by railway lines and can only be accessed over two viaducts. Formerly a village of its own, it was incorporated into the city in 1931. Its name is related either to the village's historical owners, the Lewandowski family, or the German colony of Löwendorf, which was founded here in the late 18th century. Another historical name of the area is Kustarivka.

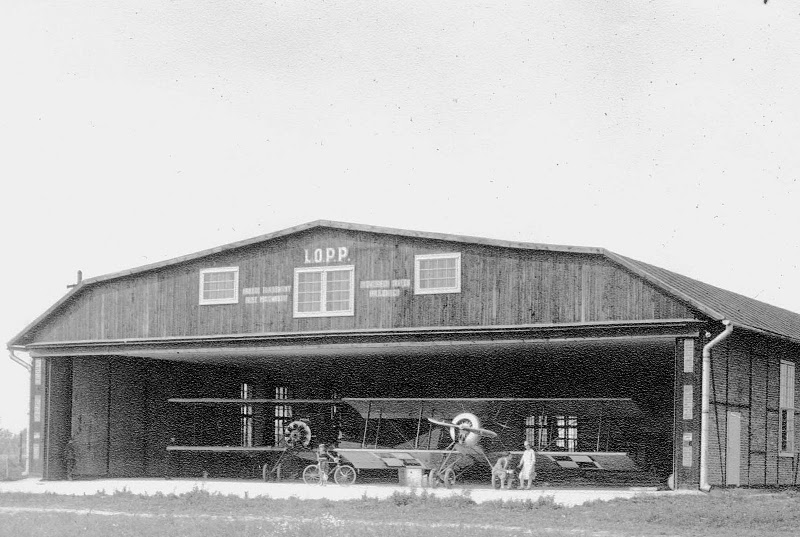
An airport hangar in Levandivka during the early 20th century

A hippodrome functioned on a former Austrian marching ground in Levandivka during the 19th century. The settlement became developing following the construction of a railway line and the Lviv railway station in 1861. In 1912 Lviv's first airfield was created on the site of the former hippodrome. During the following conflicts it served as a base of Russian and Polish air forces and became a target of the Ukrainian Galician Army's air corps. One of Europe's first civilian airlines started operating from the airfield in 1918. Regular air connections with Warsaw were established in 1922. After the creation of the new airport in Sknyliv, in 1929 the airfield was closed, but a number of street names in Levandivka still remind about its existence.

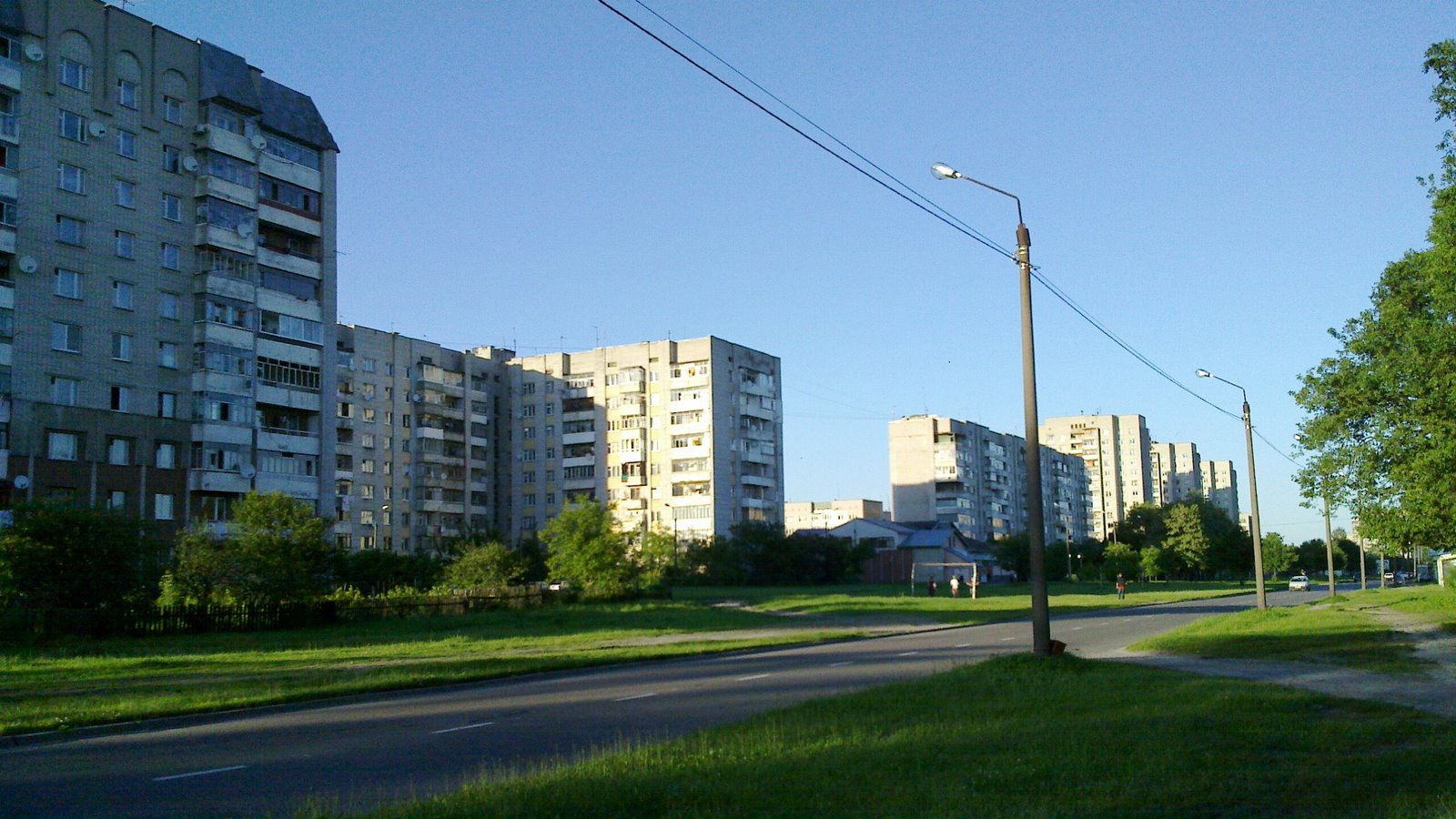
Levandivka microdistrict

Starting from the 1960s Levandivka started developing as a microdistrict. During the 1970s and 1980s the area was known as Zhovtneve, but regained its historical name in the early 1990s.

Levandivka is located on the watershed between the basins of the Black and Baltic Seas.

=== Syhnivka ===
The area of Syhnivka houses a municipal industrial park created by Lviv City Council with the support of the Ministry of Economy of Ukraine. According to the development project, the industrial zone is to take the area of over 30 hectares. A private industrial park is also active in the vicinity.

== See also ==
- Urban districts of Ukraine
