= Kazimierz Nikin =

Polish canoeist

Medal record

Men's canoe sprint

World Championships
| Bronze medal – third place | 1975 Belgrade | K-1 10000 m |

Kazimierz Nikin is a Polish sprint canoeist who competed in the mid-1970s. He won a bronze medal in the K-1 10000 m event at the 1975 ICF Canoe Sprint World Championships in Belgrade.
