= Tibor Tatai =

Hungarian sprint canoeist (born 1944)

Medal record

Men's canoe sprint

Representing Hungary

Olympic Games
Gold medal – first place	1968 Mexico City	C-1 1000 m

World Championships
Gold medal – first place	1970 Copenhagen	C-1 1000 m
Silver medal – second place	1971 Belgrade	C-1 1000 m

Tibor Tatai (born August 4, 1944) is a Hungarian sprint canoeist who competed in the late 1960s and early 1970s. He won the gold medal in the C-1 1000 m event at the 1968 Summer Olympics in Mexico City.

Tatai also won two medals at the ICF Canoe Sprint World Championships in the C-1 1000 m event with a gold in 1970 and a silver in 1971.
