= Jean-Paul Cézard =

Medal record

Men's canoe sprint

Representing France

World Championships
Bronze medal – third place	1974 Mexico City	C-2 10000 m

Jean-Paul Cézard (born January 30, 1953) is a French sports administrator and former sprint canoer who competed in the mid-1970s. He won a bronze medal, alongside Alain Acart, in the C-2 10000 m event at the 1974 ICF Canoe Sprint World Championships in Mexico City. He was national champion repeatedly.

At the 1976 Summer Olympics in Montreal, Cézard was eliminated in the semifinal of the C-2 1000 m event.

Then he had a trainer's career with both female and male national teams in sprint canoeing during Eighties. he participated actively in the successful athletes preparation for 84's and 88's Olympics and, in the same period, for the annual World Championships. He also developed a rational approach of training based on specific physical and energetic measures in situ and studies led in the national institute for sport and physical education (INSEP) in Paris. He was also engaged in teaching his method and signed several technical articles.

From 2010 he is assistant director of the Federation for University Sport of France (FFSU) charged with Handi-U, the Federations disability sports initiative.
