= Yekaterina Nagimaya =

Medal record

Women's canoe sprint

World Championships
Silver medal – second place	1975 Belgrade	K-2 500 m
Silver medal – second place	1975 Belgrade	K-4 500 m

Yekaterina Nagimaya is a Soviet sprint canoer who competed in the mid-1970s. She won two silver medals at the 1975 ICF Canoe Sprint World Championships in Belgrade, earning them in the K-2 500 m and K-4 500 m events.
