= Miklós Darvas =

Hungarian canoeist (born 1949)

Medal record

Men's canoe sprint

World Championships
Gold medal – first place	1973 Tampere	C-1 500 m
Silver medal – second place	1975 Belgrade	C-1 500 m

Miklós Darvas (born 6 June 1949) is a Hungarian sprint canoer who competed in the 1970s. He won two medals in the C-1 500 m event at the ICF Canoe Sprint World Championships with a gold in 1973 and a silver in 1975.

Darvas also finished fifth in the C-2 1000 m event at the 1972 Summer Olympics in Munich.
