= Mikhail Afanasyev (canoeist) =

Russian canoeist

Medal record

Men's canoe sprint

World Championships
| Silver medal – second place | 1974 Mexico City | K-2 1000 m |

Mikhail Afanasyev (Russian: Михаил Афанасьев) is a Soviet sprint canoeist who competed in the mid-1970s. He won a silver medal in the K-2 1000 m event at the 1974 ICF Canoe Sprint World Championships in Mexico City.
