= Ryszard Oborski =

Polish canoeist

Medal record

Men's canoe sprint

World Championships
Gold medal – first place	1974 Mexico City	K-2 500 m
Gold medal – first place	1977 Sofia	K-4 500 m
Gold medal – first place	1977 Sofia	K-4 1000 m
Silver medal – second place	1979 Duisburg	K-4 1000 m
Silver medal – second place	1981 Nottingham	K-4 10000 m
Bronze medal – third place	1974 Mexico City	K-1 4 x 500 m
Bronze medal – third place	1974 Mexico City	K-4 10000 m
Bronze medal – third place	1978 Belgrade	K-4 500 m
Bronze medal – third place	1979 Duisburg	K-4 500 m
Bronze medal – third place	1983 Tampere	K-4 10000 m

Ryszard Oborski (born 2 May 1952 in Poznań) is a Polish canoe sprinter who competed from the mid-1970s to the mid-1980s. He won ten medals at the ICF Canoe Sprint World Championships with three golds (K-2 500 m: 1974, K-4 500 m: 1977, K-4 1000 m: 1977), two silvers (K-4 1000 m: 1979, K-4 10000 m: 1981), and five bronzes (K-1 4 x 500 m: 1974, K-4 500 m: 1978, 1979; K-4 10000 m: 1974, 1983).

Oborski also competed in two Summer Olympics, earning his best finish of fourth in the K-4 1000 m event at Moscow in 1980.
