= Jan Żukowski =

Polish canoeist (born 1947)

Jan Żukowski (born 8 November 1947 in Olsztyn) is a Polish sprint canoer who competed in the early 1970s. He was eliminated in the semifinals of the C-2 1000 m event at the 1972 Summer Olympics in Munich.
