= Tomáš Šach =

Czechoslovak sprint canoer (born 1947)

Medal record

Men's canoe sprint

World Championships
Silver medal – second place	1975 Belgrade	C-2 500 m
Bronze medal – third place	1974 Mexico City	C-2 500 m

Tomáš Šach (born July 22, 1947) is a Czechoslovak sprint canoer who competed in the mid-1970s. He two medals in the C-2 500 m event at the ICF Canoe Sprint World Championships with a silver in 1975 and a bronze in 1974.

Šach also competed at the 1976 Summer Olympics in Montreal, finishing sixth in the C-2 1000 m and eighth in the C-2 500 m events.
