= Larissa Besnitzkaya =

Soviet canoeist

Medal record

Women's canoe sprint

World Championships
Silver medal – second place	1975 Belgrade	K-4 500 m

Larissa Besnitzkaya was a Soviet sprint canoer who competed in the mid-1970s. She won a silver medal in the K-4 500 m event at the 1975 ICF Canoe Sprint World Championships in Belgrade.
