= Aleksandr Beleyi =

Russian canoeist

Medal record

Men's canoe sprint

World Championships
Bronze medal – third place	1978 Belgrade	C-2 10000 m

Aleksandr Beleyi was a Soviet sprint canoer who competed in the late 1970s. He won a bronze medal in the C-2 10000 m event at the 1978 ICF Canoe Sprint World Championships in Belgrade.

== Bibliography ==
- "ICF medalists for Olympic and World Championships – Part 1: flatwater (now sprint): 1936–2007" (PDF). Archived from the original (PDF) on January 5, 2010.
- "ICF medalists for Olympic and World Championships – Part 2: rest of flatwater (now sprint) and remaining canoeing disciplines: 1936–2007" (PDF). Archived from the original (PDF) on 2009-11-09.
