= Christopher Hook =

Canadian canoeist

Christopher Hook (born January 11, 1947) is a Canadian sprint canoer who competed in the late 1960s. He finished ninth in the C-1 1000 m event at the 1968 Summer Olympics in Mexico City.

Hook was born in Dartmouth, Nova Scotia and started his sporting career at the Banook Canoe Club. He was inducted into the Nova Scotia Sports Hall of Fame in 1982.

== Career highlights ==
- 1963 Canadian Juvenile Canoe singles title.
- 1963 North American Juvenile title.
- 1966 1,000 metre and 10,000 metre North American titles.
- 1967 1,000 metres.
- 1968 9th in the Olympics
- 1968 North American 1,000 and 10,000 metre titles.
- 1969 Canadian 1,000 metre champion.
