= Iliana Nikolova =

Bulgarian sprint canoer

Medal record

Women's canoe sprint

World Championships
Silver medal – second place	1978 Belgrade	K-4 500 m

Iliana Nikolova is a Bulgarian sprint canoer who competed in the late 1970s. She won a silver medal in the K-4 500 m event at the 1978 ICF Canoe Sprint World Championships in Belgrade.
