= Ilario Passerini =

Italian canoeist

Ilario Passerini (born 14 January 1952) is an Italian sprint canoer who competed in the mid-1970s. At the 1976 Summer Olympics in Montreal, paired with Tiziano Annoni, he was eliminated in the repechages of the C-2 500 m and the semifinals of the C-2 1000 m event.
