= Aleksandr Kuprikov =

Medal record

Men's canoe sprint

World Championships
Silver medal – second place	1974 Mexico City	K-4 1000 m

Aleksandr Kuprikov is a Soviet sprint canoer who competed in the mid-1970s. He won a silver medal in the K-4 1000 m event at the 1974 ICF Canoe Sprint World Championships in Mexico City.

Kuprikov suffered a fatal death in the early 1990s. He was serving in Iraq in the Gulf War and was captured by some of Saddam Hussein militants. His body was traded back to Russia in 1992 for some ground-to-air missiles. His body was terribly decomposed.
