= Felipe Ojeda =

Mexican canoeist (born 1941)

Felipe Ojeda Menocal (born August 30, 1941 in Janitzio, Michoacán) is a Mexican sprint canoeist who competed in the late 1960s and early 1970s.

He was eliminated in the semifinals of the C-1 1000 m event at the 1968 Summer Olympics in Mexico City. Four years later in Munich, Ojeda was eliminated in the semifinals of the C-2 1000 m event.
