= Bernard Bouffinier =

French sprint canoer (born 1943)

Bernard Bouffinier (born January 22, 1943) is a French sprint canoer who competed in the late 1960s. At the 1968 Summer Olympics in Mexico City, he was eliminated in the semifinals of the C-2 1000 m event.
