= Malcolm Hickox =

USA & CAN Olympian Canoe Sprint

Malcolm MacLeod "Mac" Hickox (born September 2, 1946 in Boston) is a sprint canoeist who competed in the 1960s and early 70's. He was eliminated in the semifinals of the C-2 1000 m event at the 1968 Summer Olympics in Mexico City.

12 years Head Coach Mississauga Canoe Club - 6x National Club Champions. Head Coach Canada's Canoe Sprint Olympic Team 1976 Montreal Olympics - personal coach John Wood Olympic Silver Medallist 1976 500m C1.

Teacher with Peel Board of Education 30 years-retired 2001.

Played Jr B hockey with Dixie Beehives 1964 and St Catherine's Black Hawks Junior A in 1965 and Hamilton Red Wings in 1967 - University Hockey with McMaster Marlins 1966 - 1970 and University of Toronto 1971 - CIAU Champions.

Currently Greater Toronto Hockey League (GTHL) on ice official Level 4.

Consultant with Canoe Kayak Canada 2004 to 2007 - rep for CKC on Coaching Association of Canada Task Force to write NCCP Competition Development Coaching Program.

- 2003-2007 Founder and Head Coach Canadian Senior Dragonboat Club - CSDC.
- 2006 World Club Crew Dragonboat Championships in Toronto - CSDC - 9 for 9 Gold Medals.
- 2007-2014 National Development Director USA Canoe Kayak.
- Ironman triathlete 2013 to 2021-qualified for IM 70.3 WORLDS in 2018,2019 and 2021.

== Awards ==
- 1976 Canada Amateur Coach of Year
- 1976 Mac Hickox Trophy presented to Canadian Canoe Association by Mississauga Canoe Club for annual presentation at National Championships - U18 C2 500m
- 1984 Inducted into City of Mississauga Hall of Fame. Life Member of Mississauga Canoe Club.
- 1996 Canoe Kayak Canada Gilbert Award recipient- Coaching Category
- Recognized as one of 25 Most Influential People in Mississauga Sport 1975 - 1999.
- 2016 Mississauga Spirit of Sports Award Recipient.
- 2018 Inducted into Mississauga Canoe Club HOF
