= Klaus Zeisler =

East German sprint canoer

Medal record

Men's canoe sprint

World Championships
Silver medal – second place	1974 Mexico City	C-1 500 m
Silver medal – second place	1974 Mexico City	C-1 1000 m

Klaus Zeisler is an East German sprint canoer who competed in the mid-1970s. He won two silver medals at the 1974 ICF Canoe Sprint World Championships in Mexico City, earning them in the C-1 500 m and C-1 1000 m events.
