= Gyula Petrikovics =

Hungarian canoeist (1943–2005)

Medal record

Men's canoe sprint

Olympic Games
Silver medal – second place	1968 Mexico City	C-2 1000 m

World Championships
Gold medal – first place	1971 Belgrade	C-2 1000 m
Silver medal – second place	1970 Copenhagen	C-2 1000 m
Bronze medal – third place	1973 Tampere	C-2 1000 m

Gyula Petrikovics (12 January 1943 – 28 June 2005) was a Hungarian sprint canoer who competed from the late 1960s to the early 1970s. At the 1968 Summer Olympics in Mexico City, he won a silver medal in the C-2 1000 m event.

Petrikovics also won a complete set of medals in the C-2 1000 m event at the ICF Canoe Sprint World Championships (gold: 1971, silver: 1970, bronze: 1973).
