= Félix Altamirano =

Mexican canoeist (born 1950)

Félix Altamirano (born November 20, 1950) is a Mexican sprint canoer. He competed in the late 1960s. At the 1968 Summer Olympics in Mexico City, he finished fourth in the C-2 1000 m event.
