= Ágnes Pozsonyi =

Hungarian canoeist

Medal record

Women's canoe sprint

World Championships
Bronze medal – third place	1975 Belgrade	K-4 500 m

Ágnes Pozsonyi is a Hungarian sprint canoer who competed in the mid-1970s. She won a bronze medal in the K-4 500 m event at the 1975 ICF Canoe Sprint World Championships in Belgrade.
