= William Jeremiah Gates =

American canoeist

William Jeremiah Gates (born November 30, 1947) is a former American sprint canoer who competed in the late 1960s. He was eliminated in the repechage of the C-2 1000 m event at the 1968 Summer Olympics in Mexico City.
