= Roman Vyzhenko =

Medal record

Men's canoe sprint

World Championships
| Bronze medal – third place | 1975 Belgrade | C-2 1000 m |

Roman Vyzhenko is a Soviet sprint canoer who competed in the mid-1970s. He won a bronze in the C-2 1000 m event at the 1975 ICF Canoe Sprint World Championships in Belgrade.
