= Heinz Lucke =

West German sprint canoer

Heinz Lucke (born 3 September 1953) is a West German sprint canoeist who competed in the mid-1970s. At the 1976 Summer Olympics in Montreal, he finished eighth in the C-2 1000 m event and ninth in the C-2 500 m event.
