= Gábor Árva =

Hungarian canoeist (born 1948)

Medal record

Men's canoe sprint

World Championships
Gold medal – first place	1975 Belgrade	C-2 1000 m
Bronze medal – third place	1975 Belgrade	C-2 500 m

Gábor Árva (born 1948) is a Hungarian sprint canoer who competed in the early 1970s. He won two medals at the 1975 ICF Canoe Sprint World Championships in Belgrade with a gold in the C-2 1000 m and a bronze in the C-2 500 m events.
