= Jeremy Abbott (canoeist) =

Canadian canoeist

Jeremy C. Abbott (April 15, 1957 in Sheffield – 27 September 1988) was a Canadian sprint canoer who competed in the mid-1970s. At the 1976 Summer Olympics in Montreal, he was eliminated in the repechages of the C-2 1000 m event.

Following his sporting career, Abbott went on to earn a Master of Science degree from Simon Fraser University and became a fisheries biologist in British Columbia, Canada. He was killed during the course of his work carrying out surveys of salmon stocks for the Federal Department of Fisheries in 1988. Abbott and another passenger, Michael Fretwell, died in the crash of a Bell 206B helicopter near Vanderhoof, BC.

An award named after Abbott and Fretwell is offered to graduate students studying fisheries biology at Simon Fraser. The J. Abbott / M. Fretwell Memorial Endowment that funds the award was established by Envirocon Pacific Ltd., Alcan Smelters and Chemicals Ltd., and the Federal Department of Fisheries in the memory of Abbott and Fretwell.
