= Gerhard Rummel =

Medal record

Men's canoe sprint

World Championships
Gold medal – first place	1975 Belgrade	K-2 1000 m
Silver medal – second place	1975 Belgrade	K-4 1000 m

Gerhard Rummel is an East German sprint canoeist who competed in the mid-1970s. He won two medals at the 1975 ICF Canoe Sprint World Championships in Belgrade with a gold in the K-2 1000 m and a silver in the K-4 1000 m events.
