= Naum Prokupets =

Former Israeli Canoe racer

Medal record

Men's canoe sprint

Olympic Games
| Bronze medal – third place | 1968 Mexico City | C-2 1000 m |

World Championships
| Gold medal – first place | 1971 Belgrade | C-2 10000 m |

Naum Leybovich Prokupets (Hebrew: נאום לייבוביץ' פרוקופץ; born March 20, 1948) is a Moldovan-born Israeli former sprint canoeist who competed for the Soviet Union in the late 1960s. He is Jewish.

== Biography ==
Naum Prokupets was born in Basarabeasca, a small town in Moldova. At the age of 17, he was spotted by a canoeing trainer who encouraged him to move to Moscow to train with the national USSR canoeing team. In 1991, after working in senior positions in the sports administration for several years and after the break-up of the Soviet Union, Prokupets immigrated to Israel. Initially he worked as a security guard and a pool lifeguard. Now he is a production worker at the Flextronics electronics plant in Migdal HaEmek. He lives with his family in Nazareth Illit.

== Canoeing career ==
At the 1968 Summer Olympics in Mexico City, he won a bronze medal in the C-2 1000 m event.

Prokupets also won a gold medal in the C-2 10000 m event at the 1971 ICF Canoe Sprint World Championships in Belgrade.

== See also ==
- List of select Jewish canoeists
- Russian immigration to Israel in the 1990s
