= Yuriy Vinogradov =

Medal record

Men's canoe sprint

World Championships
Bronze medal – third place	1958 Prague	C-1 1000 m

Yuriy Vinogradov (Russian: Юрий Виноградов; 16 April 1927 – 25 June 1999) was a Soviet sprint canoer who competed in the late 1950s. He won a bronze medal in the C-1 1000 m event at the 1958 ICF Canoe Sprint World Championships in Prague, Czechoslovakia (now Czech Republic). He was the father and coach of two-time Olympic champion Aleksandr Vinogradov.
