= Péter Povázsay =

Hungarian canoeist (1946–2024)

Medal record

Men's canoe sprint

World Championships
Gold medal – first place	1975 Belgrade	C-2 1000 m
Bronze medal – third place	1975 Belgrade	C-2 500 m

Péter Povázsay (27 July 1946 – 1 March 2024) was a Hungarian sprint canoer who competed in the early 1970s. He won two medals at the 1975 ICF Canoe Sprint World Championships in Belgrade with a gold in the C-2 1000 m and a bronze in the C-2 500 m events.

Povázsay also finished fifth in the C-2 1000 m event at the 1972 Summer Olympics in Munich.

Povázsay died on 1 March 2024, at the age of 77.

== Sources ==
- Sports-reference.com profile
