= Boris Lubenov =

Bulgarian sprint canoer (born 1947)

Medal record

Men's canoe sprint

World Championships
Bronze medal – third place	1970 Copenhagen	C-2 1000 m

Boris Lubenov (sometimes listed as Boris Lyubenov, born April 20, 1947) is a Bulgarian sprint canoer who competed from the late 1960s to the early 1970s. He won a bronze medal in the C-2 1000 m event at the 1970 ICF Canoe Sprint World Championships in Copenhagen.

Lubenov also competed in two Summer Olympics, earning his best finish of fifth in the C-1 1000 m event at Mexico City in 1968.
