= Scott Lee (canoeist) =

Canadian canoeist (born 1949)

Personal information
- Born: March 15, 1949 (age 77) Saskatoon, Saskatchewan

Sport
- Country: Canada
- Sport: Canoe racing

Scott Lee (born March 15, 1949, in Saskatoon, Saskatchewan) is a Canadian sprint canoer who competed in the late 1960s and early 1970s. He was disqualified in the heats of the C-2 1000 m event at the 1968 Summer Olympics in Mexico City. Four years later in Munich, Lee, alongside compatriot John Wood, was eliminated in the semifinals of the C-2 1000 m event.
