= Peter Hoffmann (canoeist) =

German canoeist (born 1941)

Peter Hoffmann (born 2 August 1941 in Witten) is a West German sprint canoer who competed in the early 1970s. At the 1972 Summer Olympics in Munich, he finished fourth in the C-2 1000 m event.
