= Alain Acart =

French sprint canoer (1951–2023)

Medal record

Men's canoe sprint

World Championships
Bronze medal – third place	1974 Mexico City	C-2 10000 m

Alain Acart (sometimes shown as Alain Acard; 28 March 1951 – 2 January 2023) was a French canoe sprinter who competed in the 1970s. He won a bronze medal, alongside Jean-Paul Cézard, in the C-2 10000 m event at the 1974 ICF Canoe Sprint World Championships in Mexico City.

Competing in two Summer Olympics, Acart, in partnership with Cézard, earned his best finish of fourth in the semifinal event in C-2 1000 m event at Montreal in 1976.

Acart died of a heart attack on 2 January 2023, at the age of 71.

== Sources ==
- "ICF medalists for Olympic and World Championships – Part 1: flatwater (now sprint): 1936–2007" (PDF). Archived (PDF) from the original on 5 January 2010.
- "ICF medalists for Olympic and World Championships – Part 2: rest of flatwater (now sprint) and remaining canoeing disciplines: 1936–2007" (PDF). Archived (PDF) from the original on 9 November 2009.
