= Andrzej Matysiak =

Polish canoeist

Medal record

Men's canoe sprint

Representing Poland

World Championships
Bronze medal – third place	1974 Mexico City	K-1 4 x 500 m
Bronze medal – third place	1974 Mexico City	K-4 10000 m

Andrzej Marian Matysiak (23 January 1948 – 18 May 2025) was a Polish sprint canoeist who competed in the early to mid-1970s. He won two bronze medals at the 1974 ICF Canoe Sprint World Championships in Mexico City, earning them in the K-1 4 x 500 m and K-4 10000 m events.

Matysiak also competed in the K-4 1000 m event at the 1972 Summer Olympics in Munich, but was eliminated in the semifinals.
