= Helmut Wagner (athlete) =

East German sprint canoer

Helmut Wagner (born 8 April 1945) is an East German sprint canoer who competed in the late 1960s. He finished seventh in the C-2 1000 m event at the 1968 Summer Olympics in Mexico City.
