= Gheorghe Danielov =

Romanian sprint canoeist

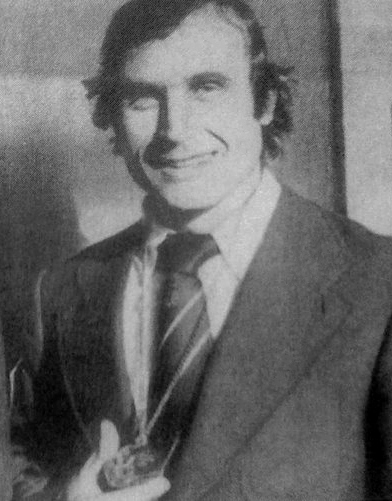
- Danielov in 1976

Personal information
- Born: 20 April 1948 (age 78) Jurilovca, Romania
- Died: 2 August 2017 (aged 69) Bucharest, Romania
- Height: 175 cm (5 ft 9 in)
- Weight: 78 kg (172 lb)

Sport
- Sport: Canoe sprint
- Club: CSA Steaua București
Medal record
Representing Romania
Olympic Games
Silver medal – second place	1976 Montreal	C-2 1000 m
World Championships
Gold medal – first place	1971 Belgrade	C-2 500 m
Silver medal – second place	1973 Tampere	C-2 500 m
Silver medal – second place	1974 Mexico City	C-2 500 m
Silver medal – second place	1975 Belgrade	C-2 1000 m

Gheorghe Danielov (also Danilov, 20 April 1948 –2 August 2017) was a Romanian sprint canoeist who competed in doubles together with Gheorghe Simionov. They won a silver medal in the 1000 m event at the 1976 Olympics, placing fourth over 500 m, and four medals at the ICF Canoe Sprint World Championships with a gold (C-2 500 m: 1971) and three silvers (C-2 500 m: 1973, 1974; C-2 1000 m: 1975).
