= Yuri Lobanov =

Soviet-born Tajikistani sprint canoeist

Medal record

Men's canoe sprint

Representing Soviet Union

Olympic Games
Gold medal – first place	1972 Munich	C-2 1000 m
Bronze medal – third place	1980 Moscow	C-2 1000 m

World Championships
Gold medal – first place	1973 Tampere	C-2 10000 m
Gold medal – first place	1974 Mexico City	C-2 500 m
Gold medal – first place	1974 Mexico City	C-2 1000 m
Gold medal – first place	1974 Mexico City	C-2 10000 m
Gold medal – first place	1975 Belgrade	C-2 500 m
Gold medal – first place	1975 Belgrade	C-2 10000 m
Gold medal – first place	1977 Sofia	C-2 1000 m
Gold medal – first place	1977 Sofia	C-2 10000 m
Gold medal – first place	1979 Duisburg	C-2 1000 m
Gold medal – first place	1979 Duisburg	C-2 10000 m
Silver medal – second place	1971 Belgrade	C-2 500 m
Silver medal – second place	1973 Tampere	C-2 1000 m
Bronze medal – third place	1977 Sofia	C-2 500 m
Bronze medal – third place	1978 Belgrade	C-2 1000 m

Yuri Lobanov (sometimes listed as Yuriy Lobanov, 29 September 1952 – 1 May 2017) was a Soviet-born Tajikistani sprint canoeist who competed from the early 1970s to the early 1980s. Competing in two Summer Olympics, he won two medals in the C-2 1000 m events with a gold in 1972 and a bronze in 1980. He was affiliated with Tadzhikiston Dushanbe.

Lobanov also won 14 medals at the ICF Canoe Sprint World Championships with ten gold (C-2 500 m: 1974, 1975; C-2 1000 m: 1974, 1977, 1979; C-2 10000 m: 1973, 1974, 1975, 1977, 1979), two silvers (C-2 500 m: 1971, C-2 1000 m: 1973), and two bronzes (C-2 500 m: 1977, C-2 1000 m: 1978).

Lobanov died on 1 May 2017, aged 64.

== Sources ==
- Evans, Hilary; Gjerde, Arild; Heijmans, Jeroen; Mallon, Bill; et al. "Yury Lobanov". Olympics at Sports-Reference.com. Sports Reference LLC. Archived from the original on 3 December 2016.
