= Hermann Glaser (cultural historian) =

German cultural historian and journalist

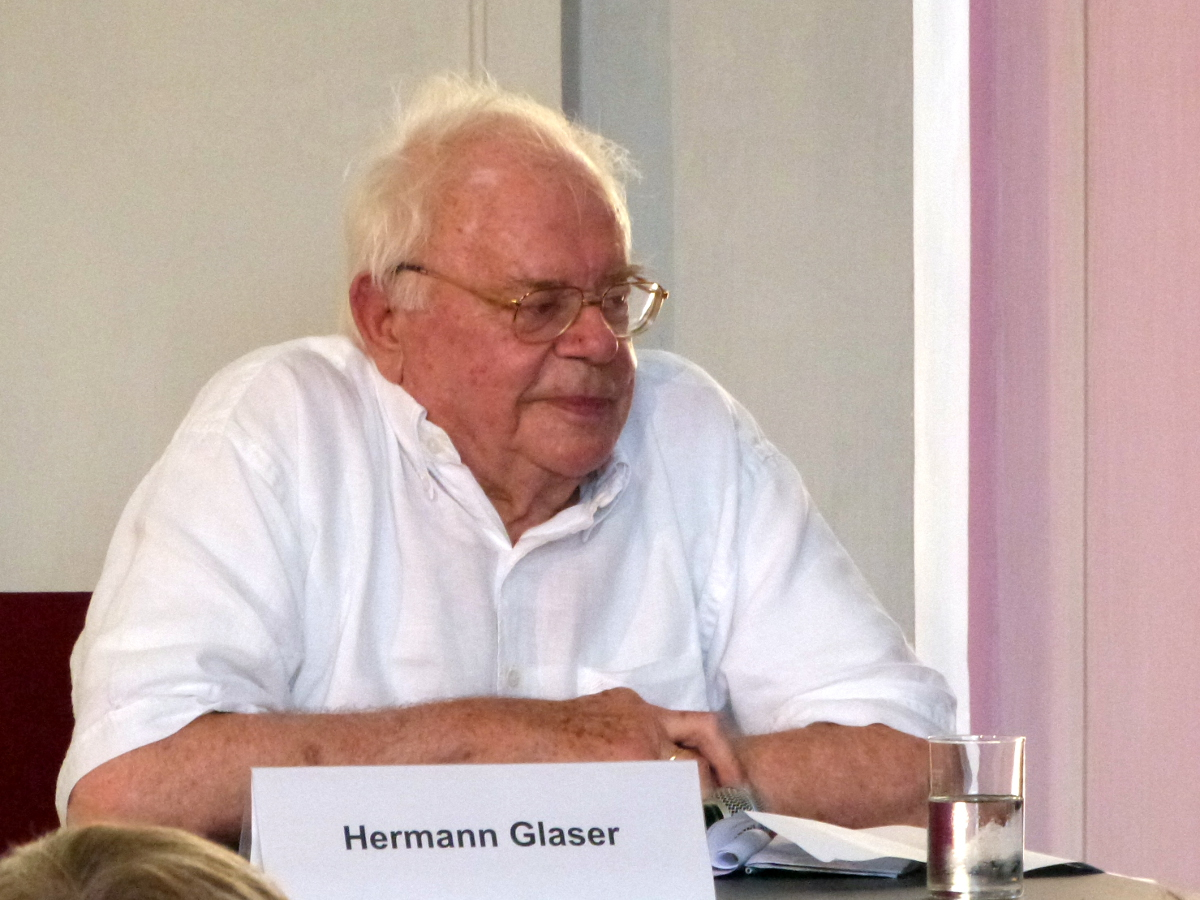
Hermann Glaser, 2015

Hermann Glaser (28 August 1928 – 18 June 2018) was a German politically engaged cultural historian and commentator.

== Life ==
Hermann Glaser was born in Nuremberg, and though he became a national figure, his Middle Franconian provenance was always an important part of his public personality. His father was a secondary school teacher. He studied History, Philosophy, Germanistics and Anglistics at Erlangen and, for two terms, Bristol. It was from Erlangen that he received his doctorate in 1952. His dissertation concerned the place of Hamlet in German Literature. His university studies concluded, in 1953 he embarked on ten years as an enthusiastic and creative secondary school teacher, first for one year in Coburg and then, as the economic and political divisions between East and West Germany increasingly came to be matched by physical divisions, back in his birth-city of Nuremberg. During that decade he also achieved literary success as the author of a number of school text books with a focus on German and world literature. By 2012 his "Kleine Geschichte der modernen Weltliteratur in Problemkreisen" (loosely, "Little history of modern world literature in difficulties") had reached a remarkable nine editions.

In 1983 the publishing editor Arnulf Conradi characterised Hermann Glaser as more "compiler" ("Kompilator" ") than author. Glaser did not agree:

- "I see my craft as making the most of a disparate palette of themes, and that involves more than a little originality in terms of selection and identification of critical aspects, extracted from huge bodies of material, so as to give the interested generalist an informative overview."
- "Meine Leistung sehe ich darin, dass ich zu den verschiedensten Themen, nicht ohne Originalität bei Auswahl und Schwerpunktbildung, durch große Stoffmassen Schneisen schlug, um allgemein interessierte Leserinnen und Leser mit Überblickswissen (...) zu versehen."

In 1964 Glaser switched his teaching job for a political position in Nuremberg as schools and culture consultant. He arrived in post with his ideas well developed. Shortly before his appointment, encouraged by Waldemar von Knoeringen, he became a member of the Social Democratic Party ("Sozialdemokratische Partei Deutschlands" / SPD), and during the 26 years that he remained in post he applied his considerable energies to promoting a "Culture of civil rights" ("Bürgerrecht Kultur") in democratic society. In order to give the Nuremberg adolescents under his supervision more autonomy, in 1973 he co-founded a self-administering "Youth Centre", the so-called Kommunikationszentrum ("KOMM"), which inspired numerous other similar projects in other West German cities. The initiative was not without its own risks, however. After the infamous 1981 Mass arrest of Nuremberg Glaser stood by the 140 young people who had been besieged in the "KOMM" centre by the police and then, when they emerged, taken away and locked up, including 21 minors. Minister-President Franz Josef Strauss was personally involved in what turned out to have been a planned power demonstration on behalf of the police and the Bavarian state government. The incident became highly politicised: although 78 of the 141 who had been locked up faced charges, in the end all charges were dropped. Subsequently, those who had been arrested were awarded damages.

Glaser became chairman of the Deutscher Werkbund (loosely, "German Association of Craftsmen") and became a lecturer and honorary professor in communication sciences at the prestigious Technische Universität Berlin. He also taught on the specialist "Culture and Management" ("Kultur und Management") at Dresden International University. After 1990 there were also guest professorships both in Germany and abroad.

== Awards and honours (selection) ==
- 1985: Waldemar von Knoeringen Prize from the Georg von Vollmar Academy
- 1991: Schubart Literature Prize
- 1993: City of Nuremberg Prize
- 2008: City of Nuremberg Citizens' Medal
- 2009: Order of Merit of the Federal Republic of Germany
- 2011: Honorary membership Kulturpolitischen Gesellschaft e. V. (it was the first honorary membership ever awarded by the society)
- 2016: Wolfram von Eschenbach Prize
