= Kapf (Egenhausen) =

Coordinates: 48°33′51″N 8°38′00″E

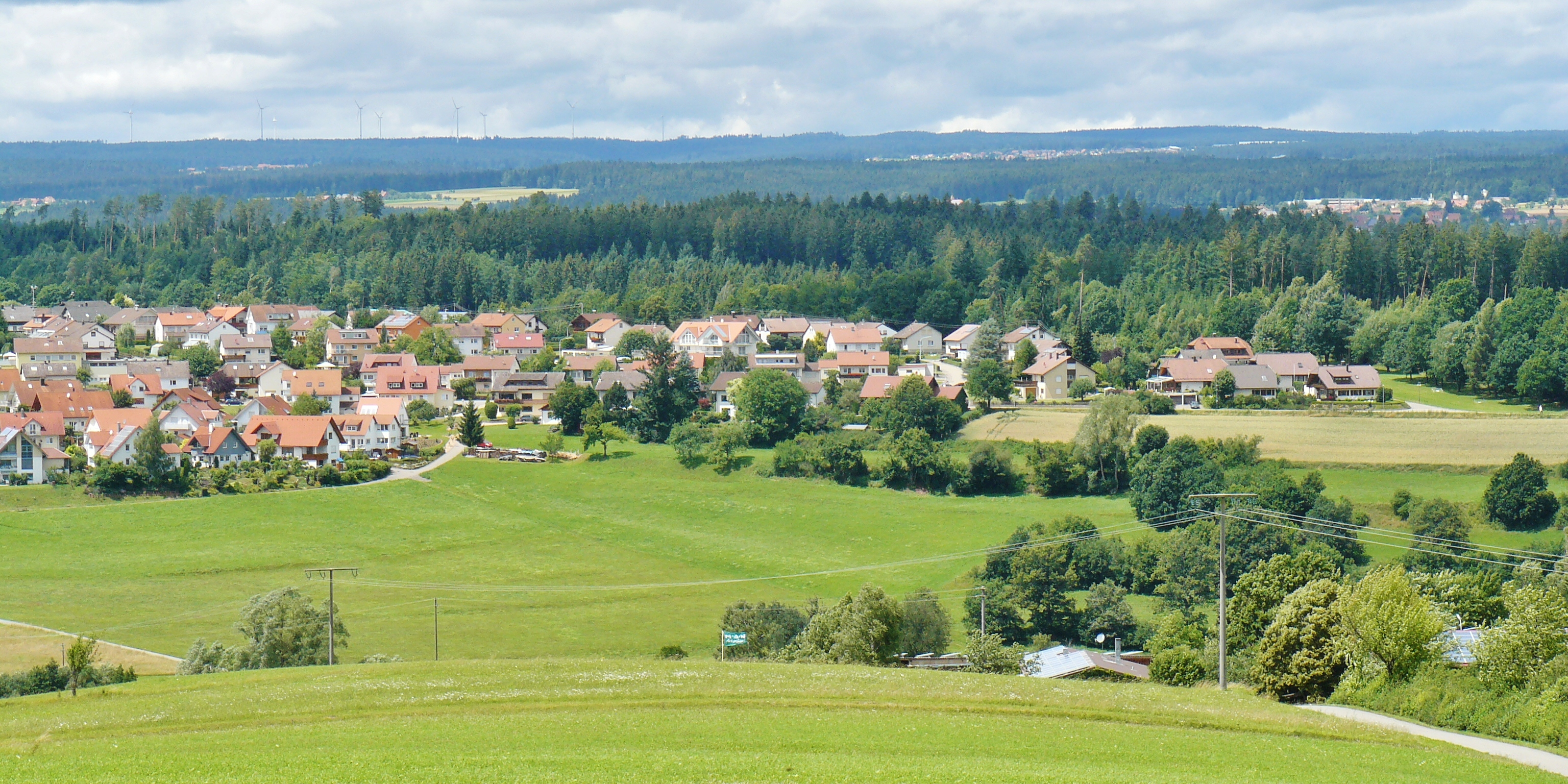
- View from the Kapf looking west

Highest point
- Elevation: 635 m (2,083 ft)

Geography
- Location: Baden-Württemberg, Germany

The Egenhäuser Kapf rises in the northern Black Forest, roughly halfway between Freudenstadt and Calw and, at 635 m above NN, it is the highest point along the Bömbach valley. As the crow flies it is around 8 kilometres (north)west of Nagold and about 3 kilometres southeast of Altensteig, between the municipalities of Egenhausen and Walddorf.

It is home to large areas of the nature reserve and protected landscape known as the Egenhäuser Kapf and Bömbach Valley (Egenhäuser Kapf mit Bömbachtal). As early as 1969 the Egenhäuser Kapf was declared as a protected area, the current ordinance was published by the Regierungspräsidium Karlsruhe on 20 December 1991. The nature reserve, index no. 2,150, has an area of 150.3 hectares, the protected area, no. 2.35.047, covers 294.8 hectares. The conservation aim is the preservation, development and maintenances of the typical natural region countryside of the Bösingen Wellenkalk Plateau, (Bösinger Wellenkalkplatte), the juniper heaths and mesoxerophytic grassland as a habitat for typical, specialised animal and plant species as well as its numerous landscape elements such as open pine woods, hedges, meadows with scattered fruit trees, grazing meadows, stone quarries and stream valleys as a habitat for endangered and threatened mammals, birds, amphibians, reptiles, butterflies, beetles and hymenoptera.

One well known species is the Carline Thistle which is rare at these latitudes and has been adopted for the coat of arms of Egenhausen.

On its western slopes the Kapf transitions into bunter sandstone; otherwise it consists mainly of grey-blue to green-brown Muschelkalk soils which form the basis for juniper heaths, rough pasture, clearance cairns and small quarries. Even in 1860, Rauhbastard sheep were grazed on the gentian grasslands of the parish of Egenhausen.

The Egenhäuser Kapf is home to the Kapf Evangelical Sport and Recreation Centre. This belongs to the Evangelical Youthwork in Württemberg organisation. Since 1950 the terrain was used as a tented camp; in the early 1960s, the recreation centre was built.
