= Roland Kapf =

German canoeist (born 1937)

Roland Kapf (born 24 August 1937 in Hemsbach) is a West German sprint canoer who competed in the late 1960s. He finished seventh in the C-2 1000 m event at the 1968 Summer Olympics in Mexico City.
