= Petr Mokrý =

Czech sprint canoer (born 1948)

Petr Mokrý (born 8 April 1948 in Plzeň) is a Czech former sprint canoer who competed for Czechoslovakia in the early 1970s. He finished ninth in the C-2 1000 m event at the 1972 Summer Olympics in Munich.
