= Tetsumasa Yamaguchi =

Japanese canoeist

Tetsumasa Yamaguchi (山口徹正, Yamaguchi Tetsumasa; born 5 March 1947) is a Japanese sprint canoer who competed in the late 1960s and early 1970s. Competing in two Summer Olympics, he was eliminated in the semifinals in each of three events he competed (1968: C-1 1000 m, C-2 1000 m; 1972: C-1 1000 m).
