= Józef Lewandowski =

Swedish historian (1923–2007)

Józef Lewandowski (1923–2007) was a Polish-born Swedish historian.

== Biography ==
Lewandowski was born on 15 August 1923 in Konin. In his youth he fought in World War II. After the war he studied at Warsaw University, with his doctoral thesis completed in 1961. He specialised in East-European history and national issues. He received the Gold Cross of Merit in April 1947.

In 1969 Lewandowski arrived as a political refugee to Sweden and was associated with Uppsala University, where he worked until his retirement in 1988. He has published a large amount of scientific writings, among which several books. Peter Englund, who wrote the foreword to his last book Knutpunkt Stockholm ("Junction Stockholm"), was one of Józef Lewandowski's students in Uppsala.

Józef Lewandowski died on 17 November 2007.

== Selected works ==
- Federalizm. Litwa i Białoruś w polityce obozu belwederskiego..., PWN, Warszawa 1962.
- Imperializm słabości. Kształtowanie się koncepcji polityki wschodniej piłsudczyków 1921-1926., PWN, Warszawa 1967.
- "Swedish Contribution to the Polish Resistance Movement during World War Two, 1939-1942", Acta Slavica, Uppsala 1976.
- ”Cztery dni w Atlantydzie” ("Four days in Atlantis"), Ex Libris, Uppsala, 1991.
- ”Szkło bolesne, obraz dni... : eseje nieprzedawnione”, Ex Libris, Uppsala 1991. (ISBN 9197165212)
- ”Węzeł stockholmski : szwedzkie koneksje polskiego podziemia IX 1939-VII 1942”, Skrifter Utgivna av Seminariet i Polens Kultur och Historia vid Uppsala Universitet, Uppsala 1999. (ISBN 9150613642)
- Knutpunkt Stockholm: den polska motståndsrörelsens svenska förbindelser från september 1939 till juli 1942 ("Junction Stockholm: the Polish resistance movement's Swedish connections from September 1939 to July 1942"), Atlantis, Stockholm 2006. (ISBN 9173530999)

== General references ==
- Nowinowski, Sławomir M. (2017). "Wkład Józefa Lewandowskiego w dorobek historiograficzny Instytutu Literackiego w Paryżu" [Józef Lewandowski’s contribution to the historiographical output of the Literary Institute in Paris]. In Nowinowski, Sławomir M.; Stobiecki, Rafał (eds.). "Zeszyty Historyczne" z perspektywy półwiecza ["Zeszyty Historyczne" from the perspective of half a century] (in Polish). Warszawa: Instytut Pamięci Narodowej - Komisja Ścigania Zbrodni przeciwko Narodowi Polskiemu. pp. 91–108. ISBN 978-83-8098-421-9.
- Englund, Peter (24 November 2007). "Jozéf Lewandowski Soldat i Röda armén, motståndsman, flykting och historiker" [Jozéf Lewandowski: Soldier in the Red Army, resistance fighter, refugee, and historian]. Dagens Nyheter (in Swedish).
