= Nikolay Astapkovich =

Belarusian sprint canoeist (born 1954)

Medal record

Men's canoe sprint

Representing Soviet Union

World Championships
Gold medal – first place	1975 Belgrade	K-2 500 m
Gold medal – first place	1981 Nottingham	K-2 10000 m
Gold medal – first place	1983 Tampere	K-4 10000 m
Silver medal – second place	1974 Mexico City	K-1 4 x 500 m
Silver medal – second place	1974 Mexico City	K-4 1000 m
Silver medal – second place	1977 Sofia	K-2 500 m
Silver medal – second place	1979 Duisburg	K-2 10000 m
Bronze medal – third place	1982 Belgrade	K-1 10000 m

Mikalai Ivanavich Astapkovich (Belarusian: Мікалай Іванавіч Астапковіч; 25 January 1954 in Zhodzina, Byelorussian SSR – 2000) was a Belarusian sprint canoeist who represented the Soviet Union in the late 1970s and early 1980s.

He won eight medals at the ICF Canoe Sprint World Championships with three golds (K-2 500 m: 1975 ICF Canoe Sprint World Championships, K-2 10000 m: 1981, K-4 10000 m: 1983), four silvers (K-1 4 x 500 m: 1974, K-2 500 m: 1977, K-2 10000 m: 1979, K-4 1000 m: 1974) and a bronze (K-1 10000 m: 1982).
