= Toma Simionov =

Romanian canoe racer

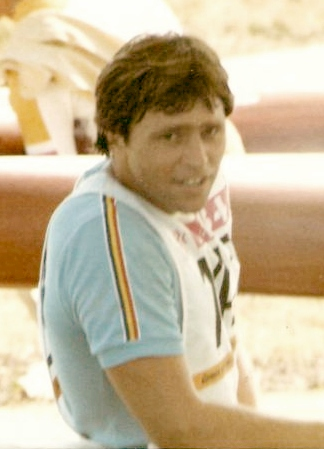

Personal information
- Born: 30 October 1955 (age 70) Caraorman, Romania
- Height: 175 cm (5 ft 9 in)
- Weight: 72 kg (159 lb)

Sport
- Sport: Canoe sprint
Medal record
Representing Romania
Olympic Games
Gold medal – first place	1980 Moscow	C-2 1000 m
Gold medal – first place	1984 Los Angeles	C-2 1000 m
Silver medal – second place	1984 Los Angeles	C-2 500 m
World Championships
Gold medal – first place	1981 Nottingham	C-2 1000 m
Gold medal – first place	1982 Belgrade	C-2 10000 m
Gold medal – first place	1983 Tampere	C-2 1000 m
Silver medal – second place	1978 Belgrade	C-2 1000 m
Silver medal – second place	1978 Belgrade	C-2 10000 m
Silver medal – second place	1981 Nottingham	C-2 10000 m
Silver medal – second place	1983 Tampere	C-2 10000 m
Bronze medal – third place	1978 Belgrade	C-2 500 m
Bronze medal – third place	1979 Duisburg	C-2 1000 m

Toma Simionov (born 30 October 1955) is a retired Romanian canoe sprinter, who competed in doubles together with his elder brother Gheorghe and later with Ivan Patzaichin. He won three Olympic medals, including two golds (1980, 1984) and one silver (1984). He also won nine medals at the ICF Canoe Sprint World Championships with three golds (C-2 1000 m: 1981, 1983; C-2 10000 m: 1982), four silvers (C-2 1000 m: 1978, C-2 10000 m: 1978, 1981, 1983), and two bronzes (C-2 500 m: 1978, C-2 1000 m: 1979).
