= Klaus Lewandowsky =

German canoeist (born 1937)

Klaus Lewandowsky (born 24 January 1937 in Berlin) is a West German sprint canoer who competed in the late 1960s. He finished seventh in the C-2 1000 m event at the 1968 Summer Olympics in Mexico City.
