= Roland Muhlen =

American sprint canoer (1942–2023)

- Born: August 23, 1940; Cincinnati, Ohio, U.S.
- Died: February 1, 2023 (aged 82); Cincinnati, Ohio, U.S.

Roland Muhlen (August 23, 1940 – February 1, 2023) was an American sprint canoer who competed in the early to mid-1970s. Competing in two Summer Olympics, he earned his best finish of sixth in the C-2 1000 m event at Munich in 1972.

Muhlen died in Cincinnati, Ohio, on February 1, 2023, at the age of 82.
