= Tamás Buday =

Hungarian-Canadian canoe sprinter and coach

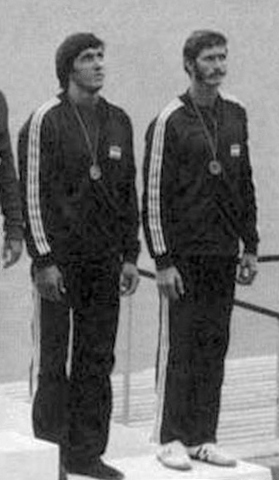
- Buday (left) at the 1976 Olympics

Personal information
- Born: 5 July 1952 (age 73) Budapest, Hungary
- Height: 190 cm (6 ft 3 in)
- Weight: 85 kg (187 lb)

Sport
- Sport: Canoe sprint
- Club: Honvéd Budapest
Medal record
Representing Hungary
Olympic Games
Bronze medal – third place	1976 Montreal	C-2 500 m
Bronze medal – third place	1976 Montreal	C-2 1000 m
World Championships
Gold medal – first place	1978 Belgrade	C-2 1000 m
Gold medal – first place	1978 Belgrade	C-2 10000 m
Gold medal – first place	1981 Nottingham	C-2 10000 m
Gold medal – first place	1983 Tampere	C-2 10000 m
Silver medal – second place	1974 Mexico City	C-2 10000 m
Silver medal – second place	1975 Belgrade	C-2 10000 m
Silver medal – second place	1977 Sofia	C-2 1000 m
Silver medal – second place	1979 Duisburg	C-2 1000 m
Silver medal – second place	1981 Nottingham	C-1 1000 m
Bronze medal – third place	1973 Tampere	C-2 10000 m
Bronze medal – third place	1977 Sofia	C-1 1000 m
Bronze medal – third place	1979 Duisburg	C-2 10000 m
Bronze medal – third place	1982 Belgrade	C-2 10000 m

Tamás Buday (born 5 July 1952) is a Canadian sprint canoe coach and retired Hungarian canoe sprinter. He competed in doubles at the 1976 and 1980 Olympics and won two bronze medals in 1976. From 1978 to 1983, he also won thirteen medals at the ICF Canoe Sprint World Championships with four gold (C-2 1000 m: 1978, C-2 10000 m: 1978, 1981, 1983), five silvers (C-1 1000 m: 1981, C-2 1000 m: 1977, 1979; C-2 10000 m: 1974, 1975), and four bronzes (C-1 1000 m: 1977, C-2 10000 m: 1973, 1979, 1982).

In 1987, Buday moved to Canada, after being invited to train the national canoeing team. He is a member of the Mississauga Sports Hall of Fame and recipient of the Canadian Coaching Excellence Award. His sons Attila and Tamás, Jr. competed in sprint canoe for Canada at three Olympics.
