= Brothers Lewandowski =

Brothers Lewandowski (Hermann, Adolf, Max, and David), sons of Jakob Lewandowski with the headquarter in Berlin produced in 1871 fabrics with own production facilities and more than 56 shops.

The company used early any marketing possibilities. Besides advertising in newspapers, and on advertising pillar, the company produced 1910 one of the first advertising film in Germany. The German director Julius Pinschewer produced this movie called "Die Korsett-Anprobe".

In 1885 the first shops in Munich opened and the company became soon merchants to the royal Bavarian court for lingerie, with branches in Berlin, Amsterdam and Munich. The address book of Munich in 1917 from the Munich historical library lists them as court merchants (Hoflieferant) of Her Majesty Queen Maria Therese of Bavaria, Princess Adalbert of Bavaria, Princess Ludwig Ferdinand and of Infanta Eulalia of Spain. The business did not have the same status of that for a royal merchant of the king, due to lingerie being a feminine item.

The business, later owned by Gerhard and Alfred Lewandowski, was taken over by the Nazis due to the Jewish background of the Lewandowskis. One small shop still remained on Sendlingerstr. 62 in Munich. However it was not owned by any family member but by a former employee of the family and did not offer the original Lewandowski lingerie. The shop was closed in 2015

During the Hitler years, Max Lewandowski fled to Chile, Gerhard fled to and hid near Apeldoorn, the Netherlands, and Alfred, in spite of his Jewish family background, managed to pass as German and joined Rommel's troops.

Currently, investigations are being made regarding a Josef Albers picture in the Guggenheim Museum, which depicts a Mrs Lewandowski from Munich, 1930, and is believed to be the wife of one of the brothers.
