= Ivan Valov =

Bulgarian canoeist (born 1941)

Ivan Valov (Bulgarian: Иван Вълов) (born July 1, 1941) is a Bulgarian sprint canoer who competed in the late 1960s. He finished eighth in the C-2 1000 m event at the 1968 Summer Olympics in Mexico City.
