= Gérald Delacroix =

French canoeist

Gérald Delacroix (born 3 February 1945) is a French sprint canoer.

== Career ==
Delacroix competed in the early to mid-1970s. Participating in two Summer Olympics, he earned his best finish coming in fifth in the C-2 500 m event at Montreal in 1976.
