= Gheorghe Simionov =

Romanian canoeist

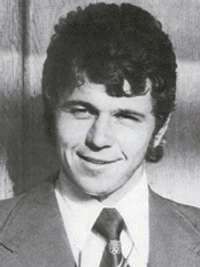

Personal information
- Born: 4 June 1950 (age 76) Caraorman, Romania
- Height: 167 cm (5 ft 6 in)
- Weight: 71 kg (157 lb)

Sport
- Sport: Canoe sprint
- Club: CSA Steaua București
Medal record
Representing Romania
Olympic Games
| Silver medal – second place | 1976 Montreal | C-2 1000 m |
World Championships
| Gold medal – first place | 1966 East Berlin | C-2 10000 m |
| Gold medal – first place | 1970 Copenhagen | C-2 10000 m |
| Gold medal – first place | 1971 Belgrade | C-2 500 m |
| Silver medal – second place | 1973 Tampere | C-2 500 m |
| Silver medal – second place | 1974 Mexico City | C-2 500 m |
| Silver medal – second place | 1975 Belgrade | C-2 1000 m |
| Silver medal – second place | 1978 Belgrade | C-2 1000 m |
| Silver medal – second place | 1978 Belgrade | C-2 10000 m |
| Bronze medal – third place | 1978 Belgrade | C-2 500 m |
| Bronze medal – third place | 1979 Duisburg | C-2 1000 m |

Gheorghe Simionov (born 4 June 1950) is a retired Romanian sprint canoeist. He competed in 500 m and 1000 m doubles at the 1976 Olympics, together with Gheorghe Danilov, and placed fourth and second, respectively. He won ten medals at the ICF Canoe Sprint World Championships with three golds (C-2 500 m: 1971; C-2 10000 m: 1966, 1970), five silvers (C-2 500 m: 1973, 1974; C-2 1000 m: 1975, 1978; C-2 10000 m: 1978), and two bronzes (C-2 500 m: 1978, C-2 1000 m: 1979). After 1975 he raced together with his younger brother Toma.

Simionov spent his entire career with CSA Steaua București, and after retiring from competitions stayed there as a coach. Since 1991 he has trained canoeists in Mexico.
