= Ciobann Marian =

Romanian canoeist

Medal record

Men's canoe sprint

World Championships
| Bronze medal – third place | 1978 Belgrade | K-4 10000 m |

Ciobann Marian is a Romanian sprint canoer who competed in the late 1970s. He won a bronze medal in the K-4 10000 m at the 1978 ICF Canoe Sprint World Championships in Belgrade.
