= 1975 ICF Canoe Sprint World Championships =

International canoe event

The 1975 ICF Canoe Sprint World Championships were held in Belgrade, Yugoslavia for the second time, having hosted them in 1971. This also equaled the most times a city had done so with Copenhagen, Denmark (1950, 1970).

The men's competition consisted of six Canadian (single paddle, open boat) and nine kayak events. Three events were held for the women, all in kayak.

This was the twelfth championships in canoe sprint. It marked the first time in the championships' history in which there was tie for a medal and that happened to be for the gold in the men's K-1 1000 m event between Italy's Oreste Perri and Poland's Grzegorz Śledziewski. The second would occur thirty-five years later in the C-1 200 m (debuted 1994) for the bronze between Canada's Richard Dalton and Ukraine's Yuriy Cheban, neither of who were born in 1975.

== Medal summary ==
=== Men's ===
==== Canoe ====
Event	Gold	Time	Silver	Time	Bronze	Time
C-1 500 m	Sergey Petrenko (URS)		Miklós Darvas (HUN)		Borislav Ananiev (BUL)	
C-1 1000 m	Vasiliy Yurchenko (URS)		Ivan Patzaichin (ROU)		Tamás Wichmann (HUN)	
C-1 10000 m	Vasiliy Yurchenko (URS)		Károly Szegedi (HUN)		Matija Ljubek (YUG)	
C-2 500 m	Soviet Union; Aleksandr Vinogradov; Yuri Lobanov		Czechoslovakia; Tomáš Šach; Jiří Čtvrtečka		Hungary; Gábor Árva; Péter Povázsay	
C-2 1000 m	Hungary; Gábor Árva; Péter Povázsay		Romania; Gheorghe Danielov; Gheorghe Simionov		Soviet Union; Roman Vyzhenko; Aleksandr Vinogradov	
C-2 10000 m	Soviet Union; Vladas Česiūnas; Yuri Lobanov		Hungary; Tamás Buday; Oszkár Frey		Bulgaria; Ivan Burtschin; Stefan Iliev	

==== Kayak ====
Event	Gold	Time	Silver	Time	Bronze	Time
K-1 500 m	Géza Csapó (HUN)		Vasile Dîba (ROU)		Grzegorz Śledziewski (POL)	
K-1 1000 m	(tie)Oreste Perri (ITA) and Grzegorz Śledziewski (POL)		None		Rüdiger Helm (GDR)	
K-1 10000 m	Oreste Perri (ITA)		Erich Pasch (GER)		Kazimierz Nikin (POL)	
K-1 4 x 500 m relay	Hungary; Iván Herczeg; József Svidró; Zoltán Sztanity; Péter Várhelyi		Romania; Nicușor Eșanu; Mihai Zafiu; Ion Dragulschi; Vasile Dîba		Spain; Herminio Menéndez; José Ramón López; Luis Gregorio Ramos; Martin Vázquez	
K-2 500 m	Soviet Union; Viktor Vorobiyev; Nikolay Astapkovich		East Germany; Herbert Laabs; Harald Marg		Romania; Larion Serghei; Policarp Malîhin	
K-2 1000 m	East Germany; Alexander Slatnow; Gerhard Rummel		Romania; Larion Serghei; Policarp Malîhin		Hungary; József Deme; János Rátkai	
K-2 10000 m	Hungary; Zoltán Bakó; István Szabó		Italy; Danio Merli; Giorgi Sbruzzi		Soviet Union; Valeriy Zhemeza; Petras Šiurskas	
K-4 1000 m	Spain; Herminio Rodriguez; José María Esteban; José Ramón López; Luis Gregorio Ramos		East Germany; Herbert Laabs; Gerhard Rummel; Rüdiger Helm; Harald Marg		Hungary; István Szabó; Zoltán Bakó; József Deme; János Rátkai	
K-4 10000 m	Norway; Einar Rasmussen; Steinar Amundsen; Andreas Orheim; Olaf Søyland		Romania; Costel Coșniță; Cuprian Macarencu; Vasilie Simiocenco; Nicușor Eșanu		Soviet Union; Leonid Derevyanko; Nikolai Gorbachev; Pytor Zhurga; Anatoliy Zharkin	

=== Women's ===
==== Kayak ====
Event	Gold	Time	Silver	Time	Bronze	Time
K-1 500 m	Anke Ohde (GDR)		Galina Kreft (URS)		Maria Mihareanu (ROU)	
K-2 500 m	East Germany; Bärbel Köster; Carola Zirzow		Soviet Union; Galina Kreft; Yekaterina Nagimaya		Poland; Maria Kazanecka; Katarzyna Kulczak	
K-4 500 m	East Germany; Bärbel Köster; Anke Ohde; Bettina Müller; Carola Zirzow		Soviet Union; Larissa Besnitzkaya; Galina Kreft; Yekaterina Nagimaya; Nadezhda Trachimenok		Hungary; Ilona Tőzsér; Mária Zakariás; Klára Rajnai; Ágnes Pozsonyi	

== Medals table ==
Rank	Nation	Gold	Silver	Bronze	Total
1	Soviet Union (URS)	6	3	3	12
2	Hungary (HUN)	4	3	5	12
3	East Germany (GDR)	4	2	1	7
4	Italy (ITA)	2	1	0	3
5	Poland (POL)	1	0	3	4
6	Spain (ESP)	1	0	1	2
7	Norway (NOR)	1	0	0	1
8	Romania (ROU)	0	6	2	8
9	Czechoslovakia (TCH)	0	1	0	1
9	West Germany (FRG)	0	1	0	1
11	Bulgaria (BUL)	0	0	2	2
12	Yugoslavia (YUG)	0	0	1	1
Totals (12 entries)		19	17	18	54
