= Jürgen Harpke =

East German sprint canoer (1943–2010)

Jürgen Harpke (15 February 1943 – 2 December 2010) was an East German sprint canoeist who competed in the late 1960s. He finished sixth in the C-2 1000 m event at the 1968 Summer Olympics in Mexico City.
