= Detlef Bothe (canoeist) =

East German sprint canoer

Detlef Bothe (born 9 December 1957) is an East German sprint canoer who competed in the mid-1970s. At the 1976 Summer Olympics in Montreal, paired alongside Hans-Jürgen Tode, he finished fifth in the C-2 1000 m event while being eliminated in the semifinals of the C-2 500 m event.
