= Peter Hovmand =

Peter Hovmand (born 31 January 1974) is a Danish–Greenlandic writer and photographer. Son of Estrella and Mads Hovmand, grandson of film director Annelise Hovmand.

Hovmand was born in Copenhagen and after serving his first period as a soldier, he got his high school diploma in Gentofte. Later on he took an MA in Comparative Literature from the University of Copenhagen with a focus on Nordic, German and French literature.

Over the years he served as a combat soldier in five different regiments: 4th Foreign Regiment, 2nd Foreign Parachute Regiment, Dronningens Livregiment (now closed), Sjællandske Livregiment (now closed) and Den Kongelige Livgarde.

His debut in 1998 was his military memoirs Til det yderste (To the Extreme) focused on his experiences as a recruit in the French Foreign Legion. He later wrote several other books, short stories, novels, as well as an essay on Knut Hamsun and Nietzsche.
