= Jean-François Millot =

French canoeist (born 1944)

Jean-François Millot (born 16 November 1944) is a French sprint canoer who competed from the late 1960s to the mid-1970s. Competing in three Summer Olympics, he earned his best finish of fifth in the C-2 500 m event at Montreal in 1976.
