= Vodnik (sports society) =

Former sports union in the USSR

Vodnik (Russian: Водник; English: Water transport worker) was the All-Union Voluntary Sports Society of Trade Unions. The present professional bandy club Vodnik Arkhangelsk used to be a part of the Vodnik Sports Society.

== Notable members ==
- Leonid Geishtor (canoeing)
- Valentyn Mankin (sailing)
