= Roberto Altamirano =

Mexican canoeist (born 1944)

Roberto Altamirano Sánchez (born November 25, 1944) is a Mexico sprint canoer. Active in the early to mid-1970s, he competed in two Summer Olympics, earning his best finish of eighth in the C-1 1000 m event at Munich in 1972.
