= Ivan Burtchin =

Bulgarian sprint canoer

Medal record

Men's canoe sprint

Olympic Games
Bronze medal – third place	1972 Munich	C-2 1000 m

World Championships
Bronze medal – third place	1975 Belgrade	C-2 10000 m

Ivan Burtchin (Bulgarian: Иван Бурчин) (born December 9, 1952) is a Bulgarian sprint canoer who competed in the 1970s. Competing in two Summer Olympics, he won a bronze in the C-2 1000 m event at Munich in 1972.

Burtchin also won a bronze medal in the C-2 10000 m event at the 1975 ICF Canoe Sprint World Championships in Belgrade.
