= Andrzej Gronowicz =

Polish canoeist

Medal record

Men's canoe sprint
Event	1st	2nd	3rd
Olympic Games	0	1	0
World Championships	0	1	2
European Championships	0	0	0
Total	0	2	2

Olympic Games
Silver medal – second place	1976 Montreal	C-2 500 m

World Championships
Silver medal – second place	1974 Mexico City	C-2 1000 m
Bronze medal – third place	1973 Tampere	C-2 500 m
Bronze medal – third place	1977 Sofia	C-2 1000 m

Andrzej Jerzy Gronowicz (born 7 March 1951 in Piła) is a Polish sprint canoer who competed in the 1970s. Competing in two Summer Olympics, he won a silver medal in the C-2 500 m event at Montreal in 1976.

Gronowicz also won three medals at the ICF Canoe Sprint World Championships with a silver (C-2 1000 m: 1974) and two bronzes (C-2 500 m: 1973, C-2 1000 m: 1977).

Gronowicz became the head coach of the Saskatoon Racing Canoe Club of Saskatoon, Saskatchewan, in 1988. He is a certified Level 3 coach under the NCCP (National Coaching Certification Program) and is pursuing Level 4 certification. His athletes have gone on to compete internationally at the Summer Olympics and the ICF Canoe Sprint World Championships.
