= Jerzy Opara =

Polish canoeist

Medal record

Men's canoe sprint
Event	1st	2nd	3rd
Olympic Games	0	1	0
World Championships	0	2	2
European Championships	0	0	0
Total	0	3	2

Olympic Games
Silver medal – second place	1976 Montreal	C-2 500 m

World Championships
Silver medal – second place	1970 Copenhagen	C-1 1000 m
Silver medal – second place	1974 Mexico City	C-2 1000 m
Bronze medal – third place	1973 Tampere	C-2 500 m
Bronze medal – third place	1977 Sofia	C-2 1000 m

Jerzy Janusz Opara (born 21 July 1948) is a Polish sprint canoeist who competed in the 1970s. He was born in Warsaw. Competing in two Summer Olympics, he won a silver medal in the C-2 500 m event at Montreal in 1976. Opara also won four medals at the ICF Canoe Sprint World Championships with two silvers (C-1 1000 m: 1970, C-2 1000 m: 1974) and two bronzes (C-2 500 m: 1973, C-2 1000 m: 1977).
