= Andreas Weigand =

American canoeist

Andreas Weigand (born September 29, 1945) is an American sprint canoer who competed from the late 1960s to the mid-1970s. Competing in three Summer Olympics, he earned his best finish of sixth in the C-2 1000 m event at Munich in 1972.
