= Jiří Čtvrtečka =

Czech sprint canoer (1942–2025)

Medal record

Men's canoe sprint

World Championships
Silver medal – second place	1975 Belgrade	C-2 500 m
Bronze medal – third place	1970 Copenhagen	C-1 1000 m
Bronze medal – third place	1974 Mexico City	C-2 500 m

Jiří Čtvrtečka (2 December 1942 – 4 February 2025) was a Czech sprint canoer who competed from the late 1960s to the late 1970s, representing Czechoslovakia. He won three medals at the ICF Canoe Sprint World Championships with a silver (C-2 500 m: 1975) and two bronzes (C-1 1000 m: 1970, C-2 500 m: 1974).

Čtvrtečka also competed in three Summer Olympics, earning his best finish of fourth in the C-1 1000 m event at Mexico City in 1968.

Čtvrtečka died on 4 February 2025, at the age of 82.

== Sources ==
- Sports-reference.com profile
