= Hermann Glaser (canoeist) =

German canoeist

Hermann Glaser (born 7 May 1947 in Landau in der Pfalz) is a West German sprint canoer who competed in the early to mid-1970s. Competing in two Summer Olympics, he earned his best finish of fourth in the C-2 1000 m event at Munich in 1972.
