= Erik Zeidlitz =

Swedish canoeist

Medal record

Men's canoe sprint

World Championships
Silver medal – second place	1966 East Berlin	C-2 1000 m
Bronze medal – third place	1970 Copenhagen	C-2 10000 m

Erik Zeidlitz (alternate listings: Eric Zeidlitz, Erik Sigurd Zeidlitz, Eric Sigrud Zeidlitz, born December 11, 1945) is a Swedish sprint canoeist who competed from the 1966 to 1980. He won two medals at the ICF Canoe Sprint World Championships with a silver (C-2 1000 m: 1966) and a bronze (C-2 10000 m: 1970).

Zeidlitz also competed in four Summer Olympics, earning his best finish of fifth in the C-2 1000 m event at Mexico City in 1968.
