= Juan Martínez (canoeist, born 1950) =

Mexican canoeist (born 1950)

Juan Martínez López (born March 21, 1950) is a Mexican sprint canoer who competed from the late 1960s to the mid-1970s. Competing in three Summer Olympics, he earned his best finish of fourth in the C-2 1000 m event at Mexico City in 1968.
