= Canoeing at the 1976 Summer Olympics – Men's K-2 1000 metres =

The men's K-2 1000 metres event was a pairs kayaking event conducted as part of the Canoeing at the 1976 Summer Olympics program.

== Medalists ==
Gold	Silver	Bronze
Serhei Nahorny and Vladimir Romanovsky (URS)	Joachim Mattern and Bernd Olbricht (GDR)	Zoltán Bakó and István Szabó (HUN)

== Results ==
=== Heats ===
The 24 crews first raced in three heats on July 29. The top three finishers from each of the heats advanced directly to the semifinals. The remaining 15 teams were relegated to the repechage heats.

Heat 1
1.	Jean-Pierre Burny and Paul Hoekstra (BEL)	3:33.23	QS
2.	Zdenék Bohutínský and Ladislav Souček (TCH)	3:35.11	QS
3.	Lazar Khristov and Borislav Borisov (BUL)	3:35.94	QS
4.	Rudolf Blass and Hans-Erich Pasch (FRG)	3:41.53	QR
5.	Steve King and Denis Barre (CAN)	3:42.72	QR
6.	Juan Bostelmann and Hermelindo Soto (MEX)	3:44.00	QR
7.	Danio Merli and Giorgio Sbruzzi (ITA)	3:51.03	QR
8.	Hui Cheong and Ng Hin Wan (HKG)	4:22.64	QR
Heat 2
1.	Zoltán Bakó and István Szabó (HUN)	3:30.50	QS
2.	Serhei Nahorny and Vladimir Romanovsky (URS)	3:31.11	QS
3.	Guillermo del Riego and José Seguín (ESP)	3:33.79	QS
4.	Bruce Barton and Peter Deyo (USA)	3:36.17	QR
5.	Rod Gavin and John Leonard (NZL)	3:37.09	QR
6.	John Southwood and Adrian Powell (AUS)	3:37.35	QR
7.	Policarp Malîhin and Larion Serghei (ROU)	3:39.75	QR
8.	Morten Opsahl and Andreas Orheim (NOR)	3:41.51	QR
Heat 3
1.	Bernd Olbricht and Joachim Mattern (GDR)	3:31.94	QS
2.	Anders Andersson and Lars Andersson (SWE)	3:34.43	QS
3.	Ryszard Tylewski and Daniel Wełna (POL)	3:36.57	QS
4.	Hans Mayr and Günther Pfaff (AUT)	3:40.82	QR
5.	Arend Bloem and Lodewijk Jacobs (NED)	3:42.88	QR
6.	Ian Pringle and Howard Watkins (IRL)	3:53.33	QR
7.	Stephen Brown and Norman Mason (GBR)	3:54.64	QR
8.	Jean-Paul Hanquier and Alain Lebas (FRA)	4:00.72	QR

Borisov is listed as Borisov Konstantinov in the official report.

=== Repechages ===
Taking place on July 29, the top three competitors in each of the three repechages advanced to the semifinals.

Repechage 1
1.	Danio Merli and Giorgio Sbruzzi (ITA)	3:31.53	QS
2.	Morten Opsahl and Andreas Orheim (NOR)	3:33.24	QS
3.	Rudolf Blass and Hans-Erich Pasch (FRG)	3:33.40	QS
4.	Ian Pringle and Howard Watkins (IRL)	3:33.54
5.	Rod Gavin and John Leonard (NZL)	3:35.28
Repechage 2
1.	Policarp Malîhin and Larion Serghei (ROU)	3:32.86	QS
2.	Jean-Paul Hanquier and Alain Lebas (FRA)	3:33.92	QS
3.	Bruce Barton and Peter Deyo (USA)	3:36.32	QS
4.	Arend Bloem and Lodewijk Jacobs (NED)	3:39.05
5.	Juan Bostelmann and Hermelindo Soto (MEX)	3:35.38
Repechage 3
1.	Steve King and Denis Barre (CAN)	3:30.90	QS
2.	John Southwood and Adrian Powell (AUS)	3:36.02	QS
3.	Hans Mayr and Günther Pfaff (AUT)	3:36.32	QS
4.	Stephen Brown and Norman Mason (GBR)	3:37.60
5.	Hui Cheong and Ng Hin Wan (HKG)	4:17.25

=== Semifinals ===
The top three finishers in each of the three semifinals (raced on July 31) advanced to the final.

Semifinal 1
1.	Jean-Pierre Burny and Paul Hoekstra (BEL)	3:26.74	QF
2.	Serhei Nahorny and Vladimir Romanovsky (URS)	3:27.23	QF
3.	Jean-Paul Hanquier and Alain Lebas (FRA)	3:28.48	QF
4.	Ryszard Tylewski and Daniel Wełna (POL)	3:29.07
5.	Hans Mayr and Günther Pfaff (AUT)	3:29.45
6.	Danio Merli and Giorgio Sbruzzi (ITA)	3:35.95
Semifinal 2
1.	Lazar Khristov and Borislav Borisov (BUL)	3:26.76	QF
2.	Zoltán Bakó and István Szabó (HUN)	3:27.62	QF
3.	Policarp Malîhin and Larion Serghei (ROU)	3:27.93	QF
4.	Anders Andersson and Lars Andersson (SWE)	3:28.27
5.	John Southwood and Adrian Powell (AUS)	3:29.19
6.	Rudolf Blass and Hans-Erich Pasch (FRG)	3:30.03
Semifinal 3
1.	Bernd Olbricht and Joachim Mattern (GDR)	3:32.58	QF
2.	Steve King and Denis Barre (CAN)	3:33.91	QF
3.	Guillermo del Riego and José Seguín (ESP)	3:34.22	QF
4.	Zdenék Bohutínský and Ladislav Souček (TCH)	3:35.76
5.	Morten Opsahl and Andreas Orheim (NOR)	3:36.24
6.	Bruce Barton and Peter Deyo (USA)	3:41.35

=== Final ===
The final was held on July 31.

Gold	Serhei Nahorny and Vladimir Romanovsky (URS)	3:29.01
Silver	Bernd Olbricht and Joachim Mattern (GDR)	3:29.33
Bronze	Zoltán Bakó and István Szabó (HUN)	3:30.36
4.	Jean-Paul Hanquier and Alain Lebas (FRA)	3:33.05
5.	Guillermo del Riego and José Seguín (ESP)	3:33.16
6.	Jean-Pierre Burny and Paul Hoekstra (BEL)	3:33.86
7.	Policarp Malîhin and Larion Serghei (ROU)	3:34.27
8.	Steve King and Denis Barre (CAN)	3:34.46
9.	Lazar Khristov and Borislav Borisov (BUL)	3:37.30
