= Canoeing at the 1976 Summer Olympics – Men's K-2 500 metres =

The men's K-2 500 metres event was a pairs kayaking event conducted as part of the Canoeing at the 1976 Summer Olympics program. This event made its debut at these games.

== Medalists ==
| Gold | Silver | Bronze |
| Joachim Mattern and Bernd Olbricht (GDR) | Serhei Nahorny and Vladimir Romanovsky (URS) | Larion Serghei and Policarp Malîhin (ROU) |

== Results ==
=== Heats ===
The 21 crews first raced in three heats on July 28. The top three finishers from each of the heats advanced directly to the semifinals while the remaining 12 teams were relegated to the repechages.

Heat 1
| 1. | Jean-Pierre Burny and Paul Hoekstra (BEL) | 1:42.32 | QS |
| 2. | John Southwood and John Sumegi (AUS) | 1:42.40 | QS |
| 3. | Arend Bloem and Lodewijk Jacobs (NED) | 1:44.88 | QS |
| 4. | Bruno Bicocchi and Antoine Cipriani (FRA) | 1:45.40 | QR |
| 5. | Rod Gavin and John Leonard (NZL) | 1:47.03 | QR |
| 6. | Juan Bostelmann and Hermelindo Soto (MEX) | 1:48.88 | QR |
| 7. | Rudolf Blass and Hans-Erich Pasch (FRG) | 1:48.89 | QR |
| 8. | Michael Johnson and William Leach (USA) | 1:55.10 | QR |
Heat 2
| 1. | Joachim Mattern and Bernd Olbricht (GDR) | 1:40.14 | QS |
| 2. | Sergei Nagornyi and Vladimir Romanovsky (URS) | 1:40.23 | QS |
| 3. | José Seguin and Guillermo del Riego (ESP) | 1:41.24 | QS |
| 4. | Anders Andersson and Lars Andersson (SWE) | 1:42.56 | QR |
| 5. | József Deme and János Rátkai (HUN) | 1:42.75 | QR |
| 6. | Ryszard Oborski and Grzegorz Śledziewski (POL) | 1:46.31 | QR |
Heat 3
| 1. | Larion Serghei and Policarp Malîhin (ROU) | 1:43.49 | QS |
| 2. | Hannu Kojo and Kari Markkanen (FIN) | 1:44.51 | QS |
| 3. | Lazar Khristov and Borislav Borisov (BUL) | 1:46.02 | QS |
| 4. | Dennis Barre and Steve King (CAN) | 1:46.47 | QR |
| 5. | Paolo Lepori and Pier Duilio Puccetti (ITA) | 1:49.59 | QR |
| 6. | Delcran Burns and Brendan O'Connell (IRL) | 1:56.86 | QR |
| 7. | Ng Hin Wan and Hui Cheong (HKG) | 2:08.70 | QR |

Borisov is listed as Borislav Konstantinov in the official report.

=== Repechages ===
The 12 crews first raced in three repechages on July 28. The top three finishers from each of the repechages advanced directly to the semifinals.

Repechage 1
| 1. | József Deme and János Rátkai (HUN) | 1:42.51 | QS |
| 2. | Bruno Bicocchi and Antoine Cipriani (FRA) | 1:44.98 | QS |
| 3. | Rudolf Blass and Hans-Erich Pasch (FRG) | 1:46.12 | QS |
| 4. | Delcran Burns and Brendan O'Connell (IRL) | 1:47.56 |
Repechage 2
| 1. | Anders Andersson and Lars Andersson (SWE) | 1:43.60 | QS |
| 2. | Paolo Lepori and Pier Duilio Puccetti (ITA) | 1:45.30 | QS |
| 3. | Juan Bostelmann and Hermelindo Soto (MEX) | 1:45.82 | QS |
Repechage 3
| 1. | Dennis Barre and Steve King (CAN) | 1:47.21 | QS |
| 2. | Ryszard Oborski and Grzegorz Śledziewski (POL) | 1:47.30 | QS |
| 3. | Rod Gavin and John Leonard (NZL) | 1:47.45 | QS |
| 4. | Michael Johnson and William Leach (USA) | 1:49.95 |
| 5. | Ng Hin Wan and Hui Cheong (HKG) | 2:06.42 |

=== Semifinals ===
The top three finishers in each of the semifinals (raced on July 30) advanced to the final.

Semifinal 1
| 1. | Sergei Nagornyi and Vladimir Romanovsky (URS) | 1:38.65 | QF |
| 2. | József Deme and János Rátkai (HUN) | 1:38.92 | QF |
| 3. | Jean-Pierre Burny and Paul Hoekstra (BEL) | 1:39.58 | QF |
| 4. | Lazar Khristov and Borislav Borisov (BUL) | 1:42.21 |
| 5. | Paolo Lepori and Pier Duilio Puccetti (ITA) | 1:43.51 |
| 6. | Rod Gavin and John Leonard (NZL) | 1:45.61 |
Semifinal 2
| 1. | Joachim Mattern and Bernd Olbricht (GDR) | 1:39.06 | QF |
| 2. | Anders Andersson and Lars Andersson (SWE) | 1:39.86 | QF |
| 3. | Hannu Kojo and Kari Markkanen (FIN) | 1:40.06 | QF |
| 4. | Ryszard Oborski and Grzegorz Śledziewski (POL) | 1:41.65 |
| 5. | Rudolf Blass and Hans-Erich Pasch (FRG) | 1:42.64 |
| 6. | Arend Bloem and Lodewijk Jacobs (NED) | 1:43.63 |
Semifinal 3
| 1. | José Seguin and Guillermo del Riego (ESP) | 1:38.54 | QF |
| 2. | John Southwood and John Sumegi (AUS) | 1:40.01 | QF |
| 3. | Larion Serghei and Policarp Malîhin (ROU) | 1:40.38 | QF |
| 4. | Dennis Barre and Steve King (CAN) | 1:41.47 |
| 5. | Bruno Bicocchi and Antoine Cipriani (FRA) | 1:43.36 |
| 6. | Juan Bostelmann and Hermelindo Soto (MEX) | 1:44.85 |

=== Final ===
The final was held on July 30.

| | Joachim Mattern and Bernd Olbricht (GDR) | 1:35.87 |
| | Sergei Nagornyi and Vladimir Romanovsky (URS) | 1:36.81 |
| | Larion Serghei and Policarp Malîhin (ROU) | 1:37.43 |
| 4. | José Seguin and Guillermo del Riego (ESP) | 1:38.50 |
| 5. | József Deme and János Rátkai (HUN) | 1:38.61 |
| 6. | Hannu Kojo and Kari Markkanen (FIN) | 1:39.59 |
| 7. | Anders Andersson and Lars Andersson (SWE) | 1:39.63 |
| 8. | John Southwood and John Sumegi (AUS) | 1:39.77 |
| 9. | Jean-Pierre Burny and Paul Hoekstra (BEL) | 1:40.48 |
