= Oldershaw =

Oldershaw is a surname. Notable people with the surname include:

- Bert Oldershaw (1921–2006), Canadian sprint canoeist and sprint kayaker
- Cally Oldershaw, gemologist and science educator
- Dean Oldershaw (born 1946), Canadian sprint canoeist and kayaker
- Doug Oldershaw (1915–1995), professional American football guard in the National Football League
- Jen Oldershaw, presenter on Triple J, lecturer at the Australian Film Television and Radio School
- John Oldershaw (died 1847), British clergyman
- Mark Oldershaw (born 1983), Canadian sprint canoeist
- Reed Oldershaw (born 1951), Canadian sprint kayaker
- Scott Oldershaw (born 1954), Canadian sprint kayaker

== See also ==
- The Oldershaw Academy, secondary school located in the Liscard area of Wallasey, England
- Oldershaw O-2, American high-wing, single seat, V-tailed glider designed and built by Vernon Oldershaw
- Oldershaw O-3, American high-wing, single seat, V-tailed glider designed by Vernon Oldershaw
