= Canoeing at the 1976 Summer Olympics – Men's K-1 1000 metres =

The men's K-1 1000 metres event was an individual kayaking event conducted as part of the Canoeing at the 1976 Summer Olympics program.

== Medalists ==
Gold	Silver	Bronze
Rüdiger Helm (GDR)	Géza Csapó (HUN)	Vasile Dîba (ROU)

== Results ==
=== Heats ===
The 19 competitors first raced in three heats on July 29. The top three finishers from each of the heats advanced directly to the semifinals. All remaining competitors competed in the repechages later that day.

Heat 1
1.	Oreste Perri (ITA)	3:55.67	QS
2.	Géza Csapó (HUN)	3:57.46	QS
3.	Theo Classens (BEL)	3:59.34	QS
4.	David Gilman (USA)	4:05.38	QR
5.	Patrick Genestier (FRA)	4:09.79	QR
6.	Hans Eich (FRG)	4:22.99	QR
7.	Mak Chi Wai (HKG)	4:54.89	QR
Heat 2
1.	Rüdiger Helm (GDR)	3:53.41	QS
2.	Vasile Dîba (ROU)	3:57.19	QS
3.	Hannu Kojo (FIN)	4:01.44	QS
4.	Donald Cooper (NZL)	4:04.29	QR
5.	Libor Štark (TCH)	4:11.96	QR
6.	Günther Pfaff (AUT)	4:14.92	QR
Heat 3
1.	Aleksandr Shaparenko (URS)	3:54.42	QS
2.	Grezgorz Śledziewski (POL)	3:55.76	QS
3.	Douglas Parnham (GBR)	3:56.47	QS
4.	Berndt Andersson (SWE)	3:57.00	QR
5.	Fernando Henríquez (ESP)	3:59.06	QR
6.	Reed Oldershaw (CAN)	4:07.03	QR

Perri and Diba were disqualified for underweight boats after their heats, but the decision was reversed when judges announced that the super sensitive electronic scales had responded to a change in atmospheric pressure.

=== Repechages ===
Taking place on July 29, three repechages were held. The top three finishers in each repechage advanced to the semifinals.

Repechage 1
1.	David Gilman (USA)	4:16.10	QS
2.	Libor Štark (TCH)	4:19.86	QS
3.	Reed Oldershaw (CAN)	4:24.11	QS
4.	Mak Chi Wai (HKG)	4:42.38
Repechage 2
1.	Fernando Henríquez (ESP)	3:55.03	QS
2.	Donald Cooper (NZL)	3:55.52	QS
3.	Hans Eich (FRG)	3:58.49	QS
Repechage 3
1.	Patrick Genestier (FRA)	3:59.85	QS
2.	Berndt Andersson (SWE)	4:08.62	QS
3.	Günther Pfaff (AUT)	4:14.90	QS

=== Semifinals ===
Raced on July 31, the top three finishers from each of the three semifinals advanced to the final.

Semifinal 1
1.	Oreste Perri (ITA)	3:50.19	QF
2.	Vasile Dîba (ROU)	3:51.69	QF
3.	Douglas Parnham (GBR)	3:52.00	QF
4.	Donald Cooper (NZL)	3:53.21
5.	David Gilman (USA)	3:54.12
6.	Günther Pfaff (AUT)	4:08.65
Semifinal 2
1.	Grezgorz Śledziewski (POL)	3:46.88	QF
2.	Rüdiger Helm (GDR)	3:47.82	QF
3.	Berndt Andersson (SWE)	3:47.97	QF
4.	Reed Oldershaw (CAN)	3:48.82
5.	Fernando Henríquez (ESP)	3:54.33
6.	Theo Classens (BEL)	4:01.38
Semifinal 3
1.	Géza Csapó (HUN)	3:44.77	QF
2.	Aleksandr Shaparenko (URS)	3:45.30	QF
3.	Libor Štark (TCH)	3:53.11	QF
4.	Hannu Kojo (FIN)	3:55.03
5.	Patrick Genestier (FRA)	3:55.61
6.	Hans Eich (FRG)	4:16.77

=== Final ===
The final took place on July 31.

Gold	Rüdiger Helm (GDR)	3:48.20
Silver	Géza Csapó (HUN)	3:48.84
Bronze	Vasile Dîba (ROU)	3:49.65
4.	Oreste Perri (ITA)	3:51.13
5.	Aleksandr Shaparenko (URS)	3:51.45
6.	Berndt Andersson (SWE)	3:51.94
7.	Douglas Parnham (GBR)	3:52.64
8.	Grezgorz Śledziewski (POL)	3:54.29
9.	Libor Štark (TCH)	3:55.98

Helm, the youngest competitor of the event, was fifth at the 250 meter mark, then made his move at the last quarter of the race. Passing Csapó, he shouted for joy as he crossed the finish line in victory.
