= Canoeing at the 1968 Summer Olympics – Men's K-2 1000 metres =

The men's K-2 1000 metres event was a pairs kayaking event conducted as part of the Canoeing at the 1968 Summer Olympics program. In the official report, heats were shown timed in tenths of a second (0.1) while the rest of the events were shown timed in hundredths of a second (0.01).

== Medalists ==
Gold	Silver	Bronze
Aleksandr Shaparenko and Vladimir Morozov (URS)	Csaba Giczy and István Timár (HUN)	Gerhard Siebold and Günther Pfaff (AUT)

== Results ==
=== Heats ===
The 20 crews first raced in three heats on October 22. The top three finishers from each of the heats advanced directly to the semifinals. Three were eliminated to not starting and the remaining eight teams were relegated to the repechage heats.

Heat 1
1.	Atanase Sciotnic and Aurel Vernescu (ROU)	3:36.5	QS
2.	Csaba Giczy and István Timár (HUN)	3:37.9	QS
3.	Aleksandr Shaparenko and Vladimir Morozov (URS)	3:40.9	QS
4.	Adrian Powell and John Southwood (AUS)	3:42.6	QR
5.	Lars Andersson and Gunnar Utterberg (SWE)	3:42.8	QR
6.	Jean-Pierre Burny and Herman Naegels (BEL)	3:49.5	QR
7.	Paul Beachem and Peter Weigand (USA)	4:15.0	QR
Heat 2
1.	Gerhard Siebold and Günther Pfaff (AUT)	3:38.9	QS
2.	Antonius Geurts and Paul Hoekstra (NED)	3:42.0	QS
3.	Cesare Beltrami and Cesare Zilioli (ITA)	3:44.1	QS
4.	Holger Zander and Bernhard Schulze (FRG)	3:50.8	QR
5.	Paul Gnamia M'Boule and N'Gama N'Gama (CIV)	4:09.8	QR
6.	Arpad Simonyik and Jean Barre (CAN)	4:14.5	QR
-	Karl-Gustav von Alfthan and Heikki Mäkelä (FIN)	Did not start
Heat 3
1.	Klaus Heinroth and Manfred Ehrhardt (GDR)	3:50.3	QS
2.	Staniša Radmanović and Zlatomir Šuvački (YUG)	3:51.5	QS
3.	Peter Lawler and Mark Whitby (GBR)	3:53.5	QS
4.	Alonso Heinze and Jerónimo Gómez (MEX)	4:09.9	QR
-	Hans Knudsen and Erik Hansen (DEN)	Did not start
-	Egil Søby and Jan Johansen (NOR)	Did not start

=== Repechages ===
Taking place on October 23, the top three competitors in each of the two repechages advanced to the semifinals.

Repechage 1
1.	Jean-Pierre Burny and Herman Naegels (BEL)	3:47.64	QS
2.	Adrian Powell and John Southwood (AUS)	3:50.82	QS
3.	Paul Gnamia M'Boule and N'Gama N'Gama (CIV)	4:07.98	QS
Repechage 2
1.	Holger Zander and Bernhard Schulze (FRG)	3:50.08	QS
2.	Lars Andersson and Gunnar Utterberg (SWE)	3:54.18	QS
3.	Arpad Simonyik and Jean Barre (CAN)	3:59.03	QS
4.	Paul Beachem and Peter Weigand (USA)	4:00.04
5.	Alonso Heinze and Jerónimo Gómez (MEX)	4:11.57

=== Semifinals ===
The top three finishers in each of the three semifinals (raced on October 24) advanced to the final.

Semifinal 1
1.	Atanase Sciotnic and Aurel Vernescu (ROU)	3:43.94	QF
2.	Jean-Pierre Burny and Herman Naegels (BEL)	3:44.63	QF
3.	Antonius Geurts and Paul Hoekstra (NED)	3:53.05	QF
4.	Arpad Simonyik and Jean Barre (CAN)	3:58.37
5.	Peter Lawler and Mark Whitby (GBR)	3:59.50
Semifinal 2
1.	Aleksandr Shaparenko and Vladimir Morozov (URS)	3:44.39	QF
2.	Gerhard Siebold and Günther Pfaff (AUT)	3:46.30	QF
3.	Holger Zander and Bernhard Schulze (FRG)	3:49.19	QF
4.	Staniša Radmanović and Zlatomir Šuvački (YUG)	3:53.60
5.	Paul Gnamia M'Boule and N'Gama N'Gama (CIV)	4:01.31
Semifinal 3
1.	Csaba Giczy and István Timár (HUN)	3:45.77	QF
2.	Cesare Beltrami and Cesare Zilioli (ITA)	3:48.69	QF
3.	Lars Andersson and Gunnar Utterberg (SWE)	3:48.97	QF
4.	Klaus Heinroth and Manfred Ehrhardt (GDR)	3:51.78
5.	Adrian Powell and John Southwood (AUS)	3:52.17

=== Final ===
The final was held on October 25.

Gold	Aleksandr Shaparenko and Vladimir Morozov (URS)	3:37.54
Silver	Csaba Giczy and István Timár (HUN)	3:38.44
Bronze	Gerhard Siebold and Günther Pfaff (AUT)	3:40.71
4.	Antonius Geurts and Paul Hoekstra (NED)	3:41.36
5.	Lars Andersson and Gunnar Utterberg (SWE)	3:41.99
6.	Atanase Sciotnic and Aurel Vernescu (ROU)	3:45.18
7.	Jean-Pierre Burny and Herman Naegels (BEL)	3:45.21
8.	Cesare Beltrami and Cesare Zilioli (ITA)	3:46.08
9.	Holger Zander and Bernhard Schulze (FRG)	4:02.01
