= Bregeon =

Bregeon is a French surname which may refer to:

- Bernadette Brégeon (born 1964), French sprint canoer
- Bernard Brégeon (born 1962), French sprint canoer
- Dylan Bregeon (born 1994), French boxer
- Maud Bregeon (born 1991), French politician

== See also ==
- Brehon
