= Canoeing at the 1976 Summer Olympics =

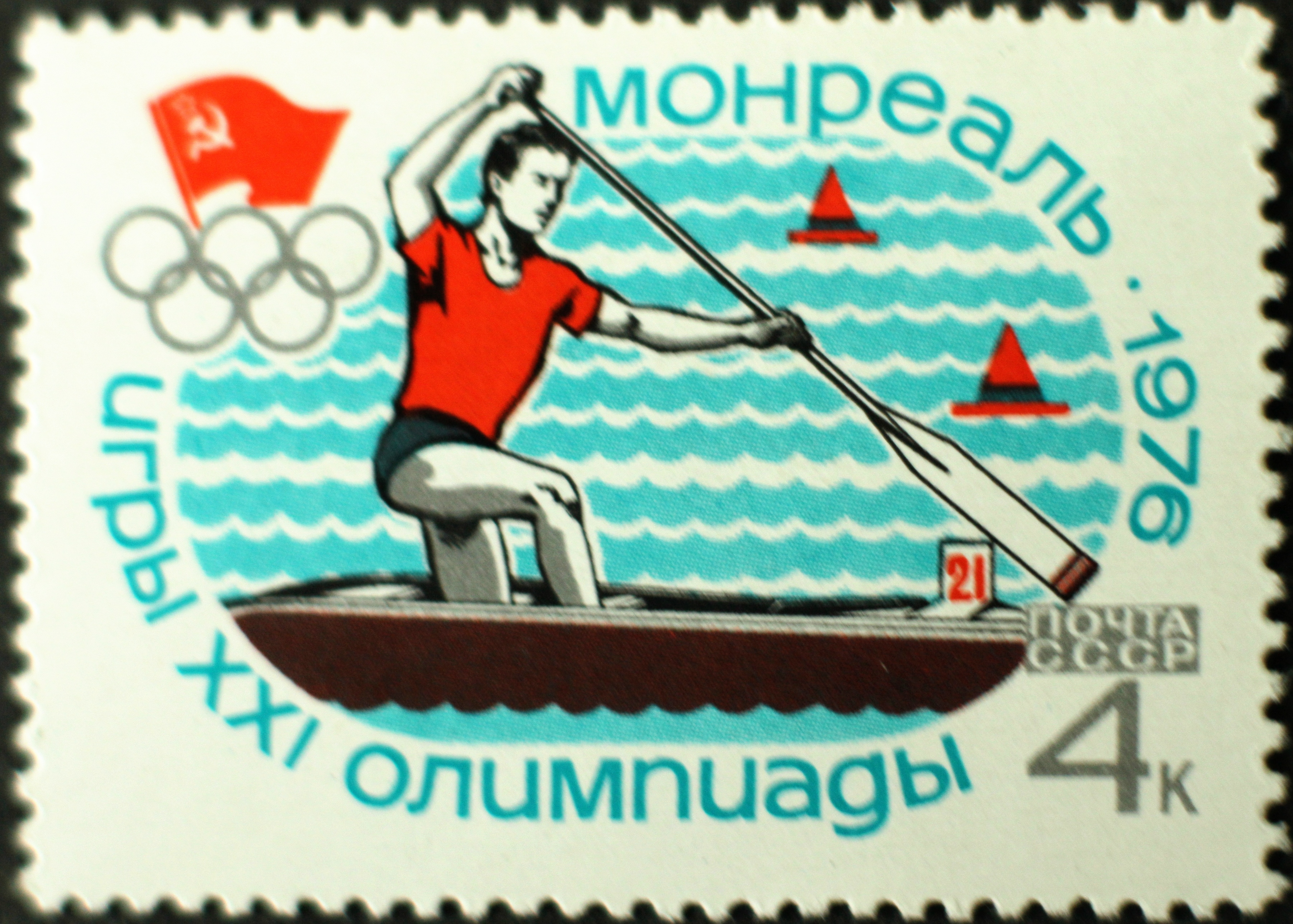
Stamp commemorating the tournament

Canoeing at the 1976 Summer Olympics in Montreal, Quebec, Canada consisted of 11 events, all in canoe sprint, held at the rowing basin on Notre Dame Island. The canoe slalom events introduced at the previous Games in Munich were not included in the Montreal program though four 500 m events for men were (C-1, C-2, K-1, and K-2).

== Medal summary ==
=== Men's events ===
Games	Gold	Silver	Bronze
C-1 500 metres	Aleksandr Rogov; Soviet Union	John Wood; Canada	Matija Ljubek; Yugoslavia
C-1 1000 metres	Matija Ljubek; Yugoslavia	Vasyl Yurchenko; Soviet Union	Tamás Wichmann; Hungary
C-2 500 meters	Serhei Petrenko and Aleksandr Vinogradov; Soviet Union	Jerzy Opara and Andrzej Gronowicz; Poland	Tamás Buday and Oszkár Frey; Hungary
C-2 1000 metres	Serhei Petrenko and Aleksandr Vinogradov; Soviet Union	Gheorge Danielov and Gheorghe Simionov; Romania	Tamás Buday and Oszkár Frey; Hungary
K-1 500 metres	Vasile Dîba; Romania	Zoltán Sztanity; Hungary	Rüdiger Helm; East Germany
K-1 1000 metres	Rüdiger Helm; East Germany	Géza Csapó; Hungary	Vasile Dîba; Romania
K-2 500 metres	Joachim Mattern and Bernd Olbricht; East Germany	Serhei Nahorny and Vladimir Romanovsky; Soviet Union	Larion Serghei and Policarp Malîhin; Romania
K-2 1000 metres	Vladimir Romanovsky and Serhei Nahorny; Soviet Union	Joachim Mattern and Bernd Olbricht; East Germany	Zoltán Bakó and István Szabó; Hungary
K-4 1000 metres	Soviet Union; Sergei Chukhray; Aleksandr Degtyarev; Yuri Filatov; Vladimir Morozov	Spain; José María Esteban; José Ramón López; Herminio Menéndez; Luis Gregorio Ramos	East Germany; Frank-Peter Bischof; Bernd Duvigneau; Rüdiger Helm; Jürgen Lehnert

=== Women's events ===
Games	Gold	Silver	Bronze
K-1 500 metres	Carola Zirzow; East Germany	Tatiana Korshunova; Soviet Union	Klára Rajnai; Hungary
K-2 500 metres	Nina Gopova and Galina Kreft; Soviet Union	Anna Pfeffer and Klára Rajnai; Hungary	Bärbel Köster and Carola Zirzow; East Germany

== Medal table ==
Rank	Nation	Gold	Silver	Bronze	Total
1	Soviet Union	6	3	0	9
2	East Germany	3	1	3	7
3	Romania	1	1	2	4
4	Yugoslavia	1	0	1	2
5	Hungary	0	3	5	8
6	Canada	0	1	0	1
6	Poland	0	1	0	1
6	Spain	0	1	0	1
Totals (8 entries)		11	11	11	33
