= Canoeing at the 1972 Summer Olympics – Men's K-1 1000 metres =

Olympic Event

The men's K-1 1000 metres event was an individual kayaking event conducted as part of the Canoeing at the 1972 Summer Olympics program.

== Medalists ==
Gold	Silver	Bronze
Aleksandr Shaparenko (URS)	Rolf Peterson (SWE)	Géza Csapó (HUN)

== Results ==
=== Heats ===
The 24 competitors first raced in three heats on September 5. The top three finishers from each of the heats advanced directly to the semifinals. One competitor was disqualified. All remaining competitors competed in the repechages the next day.

Heat 1
1.	Ladislav Souček (TCH)	4:04.07	QS
2.	Rolf Peterson (SWE)	4:04.76	QS
3.	Dean Oldershaw (CAN)	4:07.52	QS
4.	Edicto Gilbert (CUB)	4:09.32	QR
5.	Günther Pfaff (AUT)	4:10.17	QR
6.	Bernd Guse (FRG)	4:13.16	QR
7.	John Oliver (GBR)	4:18.53	QR
8.	Tadamasa Sato (JPN)	4:27.76	QR
-	Vasil Chilingrov (BUL)	DISQ
Heat 2
1.	Jean-Pierre Burny (BEL)	3:58.89	QS
2.	Géza Csapó (HUN)	3:59.88	QS
3.	Ilkka Nummisto (FIN)	4:01.20	QS
4.	Erik Hansen (DEN)	4:07.72	QR
5.	Donald Cooper (NZL)	4:12.45	QR
6.	N'Gama N'Gama (CIV)	4:12.90	QR
7.	Hermelindo Soto (MEX)	4:18.31	QR
Heat 3
1.	Aleksandr Shaparenko (URS)	4:02.60	QS
2.	Joachim Mattern (GDR)	4:02.88	QS
3.	Grzegorz Śledziewski (POL)	4:03.40	QS
4.	Ion Dragulschi (ROU)	4:04.17	QR
5.	John Allen Southwood (AUS)	4:12.93	QR
6.	Mauro Chiostri (ITA)	4:15.75	QR
7.	Robert Mitchell (USA)	4:15.76	QR
8.	Howard Watkins (IRL)	4:15.85	QR

Chilingrov's reason for disqualification was not disclosed in the official report.

=== Repechages ===
Taking place on September 7, three repechages were held. The top three finishers in each repechages advanced to the semifinals.

Repechage 1
1.	Donald Cooper (NZL)	4:02.48	QS
2.	Edicto Gilbert (CUB)	4:04.45	QS
3.	John Oliver (GBR)	4:04.69	QS
4.	Mauro Chiostri (ITA)	4:06.75
Repechage 2
1.	Erik Hansen (DEN)	3:53.86	QS
2.	John Allen Southwood (AUS)	3:57.91	QS
3.	Howard Watkins (IRL)	4:04.88	QS
4.	Hermelindo Soto (MEX)	4:12.65
5.	Bernd Guse (FRG)	4:46.29
Repechage 3
1.	Günther Pfaff (AUT)	4:01.07	QS
2.	Ion Dragulschi (ROU)	4:01.40	QS
3.	N'Gama N'Gama (CIV)	4:02.28	QS
4.	Robert Mitchell (USA)	4:02.43
5.	Tadamasa Sato (JPN)	4:11.49

=== Semifinals ===
Raced on September 8, the top three finishers from each of the three semifinals advanced to the final.

Semifinal 1
1.	Géza Csapó (HUN)	3:54.96	QF
2.	Grzegorz Śledziewski (POL)	3:55.45	QF
3.	Ladislav Souček (TCH)	3:55.74	QF
4.	John Allen Southwood (AUS)	3:57.46
5.	Donald Cooper (NZL)	4:01.97
6.	N'Gama N'Gama (CIV)	4:02.40
Semifinal 2
1.	Erik Hansen (DEN)	3:51.12	QF
2.	Jean-Pierre Burny (BEL)	3:52.06	QF
3.	Joachim Mattern (GDR)	3:54.24	QF
4.	Ion Dragulschi (ROU)	3:58.25
5.	Dean Oldershaw (CAN)	3:59.23
6.	John Oliver (GBR)	4:01.38
Semifinal 3
1.	Aleksandr Shaparenko (URS)	3:52.14	QF
2.	Rolf Peterson (SWE)	3:53.75	QF
3.	Ilkka Nummisto (FIN)	3:54.48	QF
4.	Günther Pfaff (AUT)	3:57.70
5.	Edicto Gilbert (CUB)	3:59.77
6.	Howard Watkins (IRL)	4:00.77

=== Final ===
The final took place on September 9.

Gold	Aleksandr Shaparenko (URS)	3:48.06
Silver	Rolf Peterson (SWE)	3:48.35
Bronze	Géza Csapó (HUN)	3:49.38
4.	Jean-Pierre Burny (BEL)	3:50.29
5.	Ladislav Souček (TCH)	3:51.05
6.	Joachim Mattern (GDR)	3:51.94
7.	Erik Hansen (DEN)	3:52.15
8.	Grzegorz Śledziewski (POL)	3:53.22
9.	Ilkka Nummisto (FIN)	3:54.10
