= Paschke =

Paschke is a surname. Notable people with the surname include:

- Ed Paschke (1939–2004), American painter
- Jim Paschke (born 1950), American sportscaster
- Karl Theodor Paschke (born 1935), former Under Secretary General for the United Nations
- Markus Paschke (born 1963), German politician
- Melanie Paschke (born 1970), German sprinter
- Norbert Paschke, East German sprint canoer
- Olive Dorothy Paschke (1905–1942), Australian military nurse
