= Slobodenyuk =

Slobodenyuk (Ukrainian: Слободенюк) is a gender-neutral Ukrainian surname. Notable people with the surname include:

- Vadym Slobodenyuk (born 1981), Ukrainian runner
- Vitaliy Slobodenyuk (born 1953), Soviet sprint canoer
