= Gerhard Seibold =

Austrian canoeist (born 1943)

Medal record

Men's canoe sprint

Olympic Games
Bronze medal – third place	1968 Mexico City	K-2 1000 m

World Championships
Gold medal – first place	1970 Copenhagen	K-2 1000 m
Silver medal – second place	1966 East Berlin	K-4 1000 m
Silver medal – second place	1971 Belgrade	K-2 1000 m
Bronze medal – third place	1970 Copenhagen	K-2 500 m

Gerhard Seibold (born 13 May 1943) was an Austrian sprint canoeist who competed from the late 1960s to the early 1970s. Competing in two Summer Olympics, he won a bronze in the K-2 1000 m event at Mexico City in 1968.

Seibold also won four medals at the ICF Canoe Sprint World Championships with a gold (K-2 1000 m: 1970), two silvers (K-2 1000 m: 1971, K-4 1000 m: 1966), and a bronze (K-2 500 m: 1970).

== Biography ==
Gerhard Seibold was born on 13 May 1943 in Klosterneuburg.

His first major success at senior international level came in 1966, when he was selected for the Austrian national team and competed at the World Championships in East Berlin, where he won a silver medal in the four-man kayak event over 1000 meters. A year later, he competed at the European Championships in Duisburg, West Germany, where he won a bronze medal in the four-man event over ten kilometers.

Thanks to a series of successful performances, he qualified to represent the country at the 1968 Summer Olympics in Mexico City. In the two-man event over a thousand metres, he and partner Günther Pfaff finished third in the final behind teams from the USSR and Hungary, winning the bronze medal. In the four-man event, in which the crew also included Pfaff and rowers Helmut Hediger and Kurt Lindegren, he finished seventh in the final.

After winning the Olympic bronze medal, Seibold remained a member of the Austrian national team and continued to compete at major international regattas. In 1970 he represented the country at the World Championships in Copenhagen, where he and Günter Pfaff won two medals: bronze in the five-hundred-meter double and gold in the thousand-meter double. The following season, at the World Championships in Belgrade, Yugoslavia, he and Pfaff attempted to defend their title in the kilometer two-man kayak event, but finished second, ahead of the German crew of Rainer Kurt and Alexander Slatnov, and won the silver medal.

As one of the leaders of the Austrian national team, Gerhard Seibold qualified for the 1972 Olympic Games in Munich, where he competed only in the four-man thousand-meter event alongside Kurt Heubusch, Heinz Rodinger and Alfred Zechmeister. The crew failed to advance beyond the preliminary stage and finished fifth in the consolation race.

In 1996, Seibold was awarded the first-class Honorary Badge "For Services to the Republic of Austria" for outstanding sporting achievements.

== Links ==
- Evans, Hilary; Gjerde, Arild; Heijmans, Jeroen; Mallon, Bill; et al. "Gerhard Seibold". Olympics at Sports-Reference.com. Sports Reference LLC. Archived from the original on 2009-01-06.
