= Korolkov =

Korolkov (Russian: Корольков) is a Russian male surname. Its feminine counterpart is Korolkova. Notable people with the surname include:

- Anatoliy Korolkov, Russian sprint canoer
- Nikolai Korolkov (1946–2024), Russian equestrian
- Yevgeny Korolkov (1930–2014), Russian gymnast
