= Tibor Nagy =

Tibor Nagy may refer to:

- Tibor Nagy (canoeist), Hungarian sprint canoeist
- Tibor Nagy (footballer, born 1962), Hungarian international association football player, coach
- Tibor Nagy (footballer, born 1991), Hungarian association football player
- Tibor P. Nagy (born 1949), American diplomat
