= Canoeing at the 1984 Summer Olympics – Men's K-1 500 metres =

The men's K-1 500 metres event was an individual kayaking event conducted as part of the Canoeing at the 1984 Summer Olympics program. Ian Ferguson from New Zealand won the gold, with Sweden's Lars-Erik Moberg and France's Bernard Brégeon winning the silver and bronze, respectively.

== Medalists ==
Gold	Silver	Bronze
Ian Ferguson (NZL)	Lars-Erik Moberg (SWE)	Bernard Brégeon (FRA)

== Results ==
=== Heats ===
The 19 competitors first raced in three heats on August 6. The top three finishers from each of the heats advanced directly to the semifinals with the rest competing in the repechages.

Heat 1
1.	Milan Janić (YUG)	1:52.69	QS
2.	Avriam Mizrahi (ISR)	1:53.66	QS
3.	Guillermo del Riego (ESP)	1:53.92	QS
4.	Felix Buser (SUI)	1:55.39	QR
5.	Ian Pringle (IRL)	2:01.10	QR
6.	Terry White (USA)	2:04.12	QR
7.	Ng Hin Wan (HKG)	2:14.60	QR
Heat 2
1.	Lars-Erik Moberg (SWE)	1:51.25	QS
2.	Reiner Scholl (FRG)	1:51.55	QS
3.	Daniele Scarpa (ITA)	1:52.52	QS
4.	David Upson (GBR)	1:52.55	QR
5.	N'Gama N'Gama (CIV)	2:01.16	QR
Heat 3
1.	Vasile Dîba (ROU)	1:48.38	QS
2.	Ian Ferguson (NZL)	1:49.32	QS
3.	Bernard Brégeon (FRA)	1:50.23	QS
4.	Scott Oldershaw (CAN)	1:55.20	QR
5.	Einar Rasmussen (NOR)	1:55.58	QR
6.	Antoon De Brauwer (BEL)	1:57.30	QR
7.	Atilio Vásquez (ARG)	1:58.18	QR

=== Repechages ===
Taking place on August 6, the top four finishers from each repechage advanced to the semifinals.

Repechage 1
1.	Terry White (USA)	1:50.89	QS
2.	Felix Buser (SUI)	1:52.08	QS
3.	Atilio Vásquez (ARG)	1:53.71	QS
4.	Scott Oldershaw (CAN)	1:55.82	QS
5.	N'Gama N'Gama (CIV)	1:57.03
Repechage 2
1.	Einar Rasmussen (NOR)	1:54.10	QS
2.	David Upson (GBR)	1:54.72	QS
3.	Antoon De Brauwer (BEL)	1:57.02	QS
4.	Ian Pringle (IRL)	1:57.92	QS
5.	Ng Hin Wan (HKG)	2:12.075

=== Semifinals ===
The top three finishers in each of the three semifinals (raced on August 8) advanced to the final.

Semifinal 1
1.	Ian Ferguson (NZL)	1:48.00	QF
2.	Milan Janić (YUG)	1:49.08	QF
3.	Daniele Scarpa (ITA)	1:49.10	QF
4.	Terry White (USA)	1:50.00
5.	Scott Oldershaw (CAN)	1:52.53
6.	Antoon De Brauwer (BEL)	1:52.72
Semifinal 2
1.	Bernard Brégeon (FRA)	1:48.80	QF
2.	Lars-Erik Moberg (SWE)	1:49.00	QF
3.	David Upson (GBR)	1:49.26	QF
4.	Avriam Mizrahi (ISR)	1:49.98
5.	Felix Buser (SUI)	1:51.99
6.	Ian Pringle (IRL)	1:56.06
Semifinal 3
1.	Vasile Dîba (ROU)	1:49.45	QF
2.	Reiner Scholl (FRG)	1:50.70	QF
3.	Guillermo del Riego (ESP)	1:51.22	QF
4.	Einar Rasmussen (NOR)	1:52.02
5.	Atilio Vásquez (ARG)	1:56.06

=== Final ===
The final was held on August 10.

Gold	Ian Ferguson (NZL)	1:47.84
Silver	Lars-Erik Moberg (SWE)	1:48.18
Bronze	Bernard Brégeon (FRA)	1:48.41
4.	Vasile Dîba (ROU)	1:48.77
5.	David Upson (GBR)	1:49.32
6.	Daniele Scarpa (ITA)	1:49.60
7.	Guillermo del Riego (ESP)	1:49.71
8.	Reiner Scholl (FRG)	1:49.89
9.	Milan Janić (YUG)	1:49.90
