= David Gilman =

David Gilman may refer to:

- David Gilman (writer), English television writer and novelist
- David Gilman (athlete) (born 1954), American luger and sprint canoer
