= Rátkai =

Rátkai is a surname. Notable people with the surname include:

- János Rátkai (born 1951), Hungarian sprint canoeist
- Márton Rátkai (1881–1951), Hungarian actor and comedian
