= Chiostri =

Chiostri is an Italian surname. Notable people with the surname include:

- Carlo Chiostri (1863–1939), Italian painter and graphic artist
- Mauro Chiostri (born 1948), Italian sprint canoer
