= Ian Pringle =

Ian Pringle may refer to:

- Ian Pringle (director), Australian film director, producer and screenwriter
- Ian Pringle (canoeist) (born 1953), Irish sprint canoeist
