= Stephen Brown (canoeist) =

British sprint canoer

Medal record

Men's canoe sprint

World Championships
| Bronze medal – third place | 1981 Nottingham | K-4 10000 m |

Stephen Brown (born 9 May 1956) is a British canoe sprinter who competed in the late 1970s and early 1980s. He won a bronze medal in the K-4 10000 m event at the 1981 ICF Canoe Sprint World Championships in Nottingham.

== Early life ==
He lived at 36 Devon Drive. In 1976 he was a pattern maker at a Loughborough foundry.

== Career ==
Brown also competed two Summer Olympics, but did not reach the finals in either of those games. At the 1976 Summer Olympics, he was eliminated in the repechage round of the K-2 1000 m event. Four years later in Moscow, Brown was disqualified in the semifinals of the K-4 1000 m event.

== Personal life ==
He later shared a house in Keyworth with fellow canoeist Norman Mason.
