= John Southwood =

John Southwood may refer to:

- John Albert Southwood, Australian politician, newspaperman and trade unionist
- John Southwood (canoeist), Australian sprint canoeist
