= Sbruzzi =

Sbruzzi is a surname. Notable people with the surname include:

- Giorgio Sbruzzi (born 1955), Italian canoeist
- Luciano Supervielle Sbruzzi (born 1976), Uruguayan-French musician
