= Bruce Barton (canoeist) =

American sprint canoeist

Bruce Barton (born May 30, 1957) is an American sprint canoeist who competed in the late 1970s. At the 1976 Summer Olympics in Montreal, he was eliminated in the semifinals of K-2 1000 m event and the repechages of the K-4 1000 m event.

Barton's brother, Greg, won four Summer Olympic medals in canoe sprint between 1984 and 1992, including two golds in 1988.

Bruce holds both the C-1 and C-2 course records in the General Clinton Canoe Regatta 70-mile endurance race
