= Lodewijk Jacobs =

Dutch canoeist

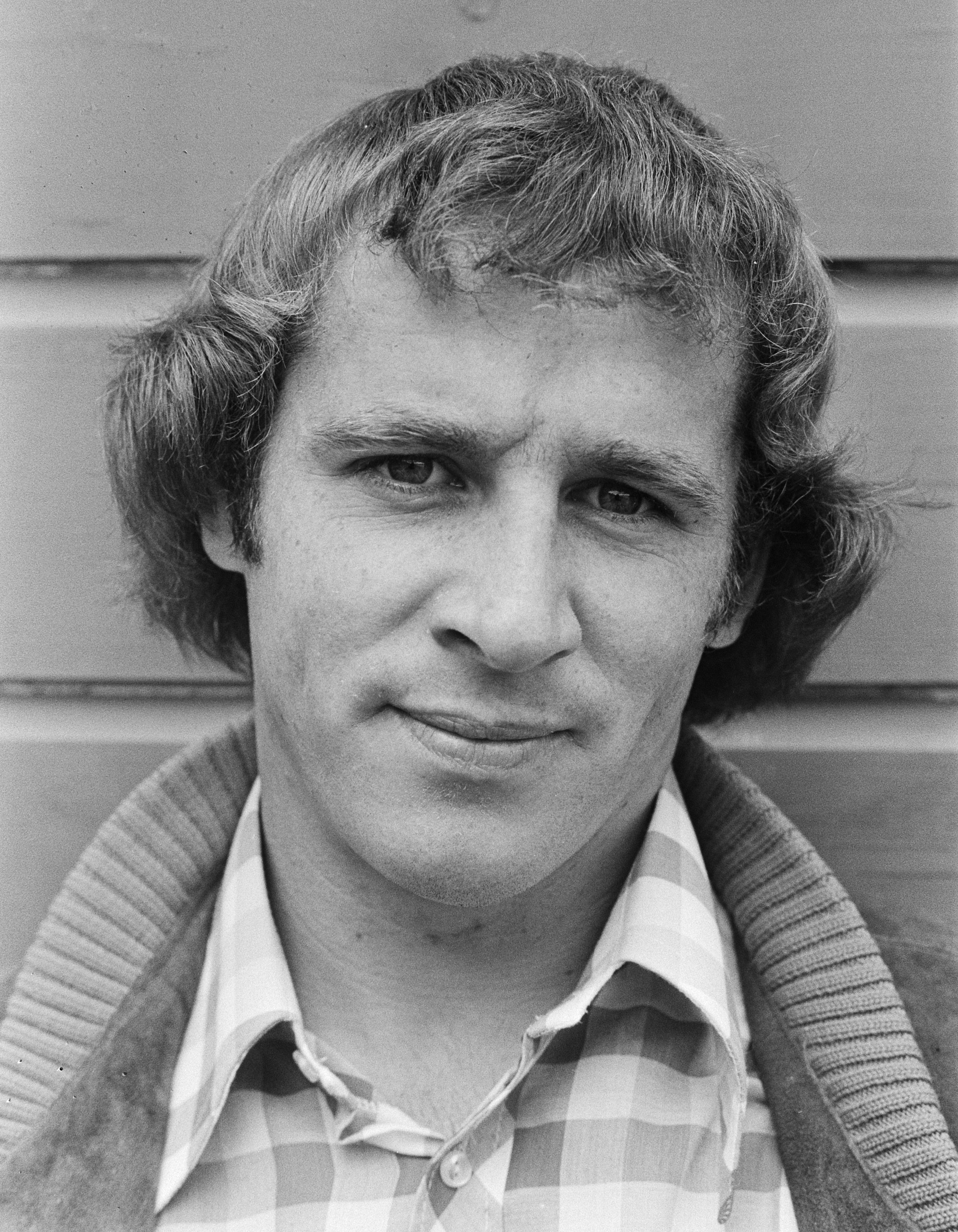
- Lo Jacobs in 1974

Personal information
- Born: 3 July 1951 (age 75) Assendelft, the Netherlands
- Height: 1.78 m (5 ft 10 in)
- Weight: 75 kg (165 lb)

Sport
- Sport: Sprint canoe
- Club: De Zwetplassers, Wormer

Lodewijk "Lo" Jacobs (born 3 July 1951) is a Dutch canoe sprinter who competed in the late 1970s. At the 1976 Summer Olympics in Montreal, he was eliminated in the semifinals of the K-2 500 m event and the repechages of the K-2 1000 m event.
