= András Hubik =

Hungarian canoeist

Medal record

Men's canoe sprint

World Championships
Bronze medal – third place	1977 Sofia	C-2 10000 m

András Hubik is a Hungarian sprint canoer who competed in the late 1970s. He won a bronze medal in the C-2 10000 m event at the 1977 ICF Canoe Sprint World Championships in Sofia, together with Zoltán Parti. Hubik worked as a coach.
