= Paolo Lepori =

Italian sprint canoer (born 1959)

Paolo Lepori (born 20 April 1959 in Livorno) is an Italian sprint canoeist who competed in the late 1970s. At the 1976 Summer Olympics in Montreal, he was eliminated in the semifinals of the K-2 500 m event.
