= Robert Mitchell (canoeist) =

American canoeist (born 1949)

Robert Mitchell (born August 10, 1949 in Monticello, Arkansas) is an American sprint canoer who competed in the early 1970s. At the 1972 Summer Olympics in Munich, he was eliminated in the repechages of the K-1 1000 m event.
