= Sergey Antipov =

Soviet canoeist

Medal record

Men's canoe sprint

World Championships
Silver medal – second place	1977 Sofia	C-1 1000 m

Sergey Antipov is a former Soviet sprint canoer who competed in the late 1970s. He won a silver medal in the C-1 1000 m event at the 1977 ICF Canoe Sprint World Championships in Sofia.
