= Fernando Henríquez =

Spanish canoeist (1956–2018)

Fernando Henríquez Betancor (March 27, 1956 – July 30, 2018) was a Spanish sprint canoer who competed in the late 1970s. He was eliminated in the semifinals of the K-1 1000 m event at the 1976 Summer Olympics in Montreal.
