= Howard Watkins =

Irish canoeist

Howard Watkins (born 16 October 1951) is an Irish canoe sprinter who competed in the early to mid-1970s. At the 1972 Summer Olympics in Munich, he was eliminated in the repechages of the K-2 1000 m event and the semifinals of the K-1 1000 m event. Four years later in Montreal, Watkins was eliminated in the repechages of both the K-2 1000 m and the K-4 1000 m events.
