= Jean Barre (canoeist) =

Canadian canoeist

Jean Barré (born January 3, 1945) is a Canadian sprint canoer who competed in the late 1960s and early 1970s. At the 1968 Summer Olympics in Mexico City, he was eliminated in the heats of the K-4 1000 m event and in the semifinals of the K-2 1000 m event. Four years later in Munich, Barré was eliminated in the semifinals of both the K-2 1000 m and K-4 1000 m events.
