= Tadamasa Sato =

Japanese canoeist

Personal information
- Native name: 佐藤 忠正
- Nationality: Japanese
- Born: May 20, 1941 (age 84) Japan

Sport
- Sport: Canoeing
- Event: Sprint canoe

Achievements and titles
- Olympic finals: 1964 Tokyo; 1972 Munich

Tadamasa Sato (佐藤 忠正, Satō Tadamasa; born May 20, 1941) is a Japanese sprint canoer who competed from the mid-1960s to the early 1970s. He was eliminated in the repechages of the K-4 1000 m event at the 1964 Summer Olympics in Tokyo. Eight years later in Munich, Sato was eliminated in the repechages of the K-1 1000 m event.
