= Peter Korsch =

Medal record

Men's canoe sprint

World Championships
Bronze medal – third place	1973 Tampere	K-4 1000 m

Peter Korsch is an East German sprint canoer who competed in the early 1970s. He won a bronze medal in the K-4 1000 m event at the 1973 ICF Canoe Sprint World Championships in Tampere.
