= John Leonard (canoeist) =

New Zealand canoeist

John Leonard (born 2 June 1948) is a New Zealand sprint canoeist who competed in the late 1970s. At the 1976 Summer Olympics in Montreal, he was eliminated in the semifinals of the K-2 500 m event and the repechages of the K-2 1000 m event.
