= Aviram Mizrahi =

Israeli sprint canoer (born 1962)

Aviram Mizrahi (Hebrew: אבירם מזרחי; born January 20, 1962) is an Israeli sprint canoer who competed in the mid-1980s. He was eliminated in the semifinals of the K-1 500 m event at the 1984 Summer Olympics in Los Angeles.
