= Peter Weigand =

American sprint canoeist (1941–2011)

Peter Michael Weigand (July 26, 1941 – March 18, 2011) was an American sprint canoer who competed in the late 1960s. He was eliminated in the repechage round of K-2 1000 m event at the 1968 Summer Olympics in Mexico City.
