= Felix Buser =

Swiss sprint canoer

Felix Buser (born November 23, 1957) is a Swiss sprint canoer who competed in the mid-1980s. At the 1984 Summer Olympics in Los Angeles, he was eliminated in the semifinals of both the K-1 500 m and the K-4 1000 m events.
