= Arend Bloem =

Dutch sprint canoer (1947–2025)

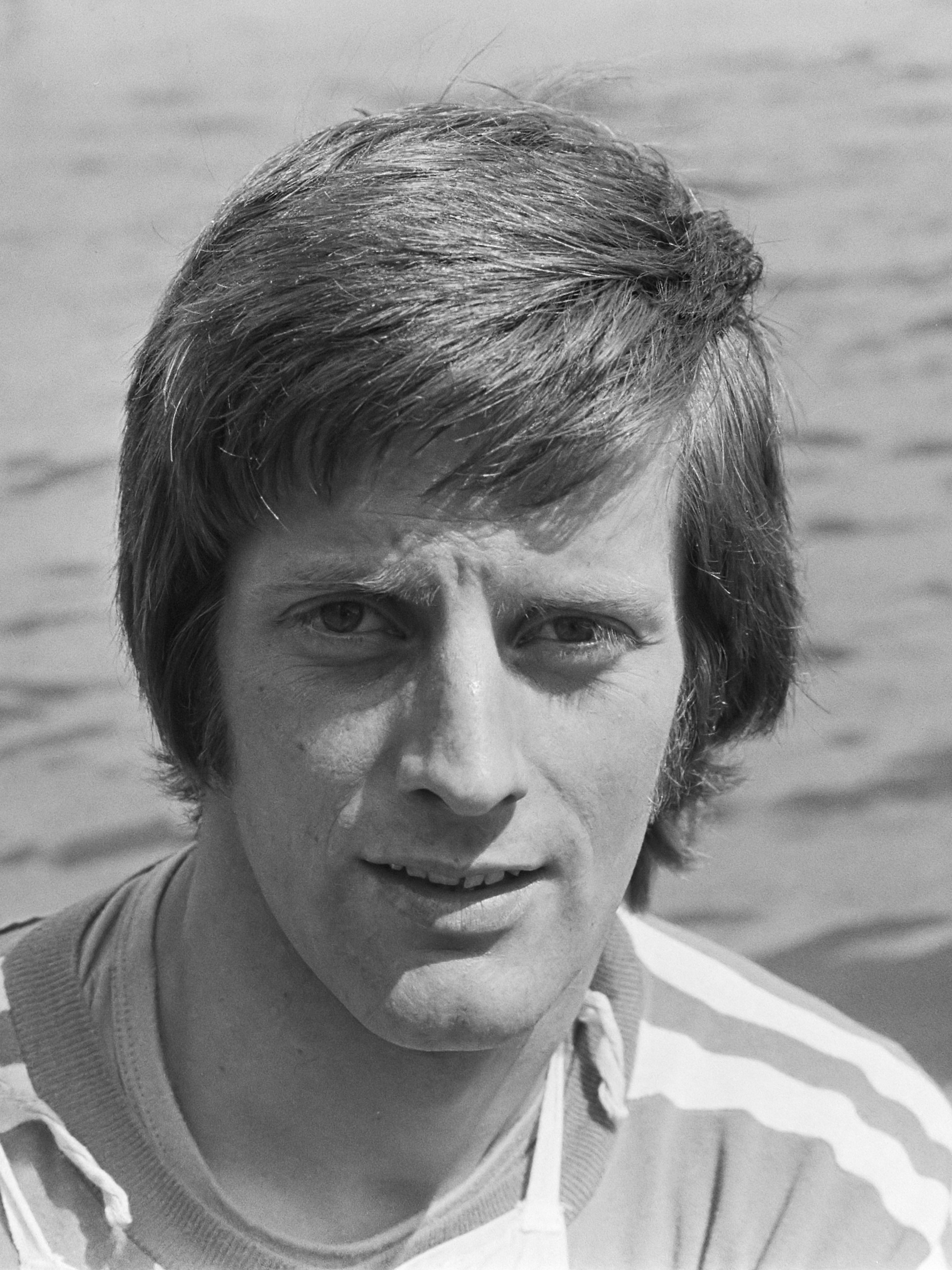
Bloem in 1974

Arend Bloem (31 August 1947 – 27 October 2025) was a Dutch sprint canoer who competed in the late 1970s. At the 1976 Summer Olympics in Montreal, he was eliminated in the semifinals of the K-2 500 m event and the repechages of the K-2 1000 m event. He was born in Wormer.
