= Oleg Kalidov =

Soviet canoeist

Medal record

Men's canoe sprint

World Championships
| Gold medal – first place | 1973 Tampere | C-2 500 m |

Oleg Kalidov (Russian: Олег Калидов; born 15 October 1951 in Borisoglebsk) is a Soviet sprint canoeist who competed in the early 1970s. He won a gold medal in the C-2 500 m event at the 1973 ICF Canoe Sprint World Championships in Tampere.
