= Zlatomir Šuvački =

Yugoslav canoeist

Zlatomir Šuvački (born 26 November 1945) is a Yugoslav sprint canoeist who competed in the late 1960s and early 1970s. At the 1968 Summer Olympics in Mexico City, he was eliminated in the semifinals of K-2 1000 m event. Four years later in Munich, Šuvački was eliminated in the semifinals of the K-4 1000 m event.
