= Pier Duilio Puccetti =

Italian canoeist

Pier Duilio Puccetti (born 31 July 1955) is an Italian sprint canoer who competed in the late 1970s. At the 1976 Summer Olympics in Montreal, he was eliminated in the semifinals of the K-2 500 m event and the repechages of the K-4 1000 m event.
