= Romualdas Vinojinidis =

Soviet canoeist

Medal record

Men's canoe sprint

World Championships
Silver medal – second place	1973 Tampere	C-1 1000 m

Romualdas Vinojinidis is a Soviet sprint canoer who competed in the early 1970s. He won a silver medal at the 1973 ICF Canoe Sprint World Championships in Tampere, Finland in the C-1 1000 m event.
