= Ernst Pavel =

Romanian canoeist

Medal record

Men's canoe sprint

World Championships
Gold medal – first place	1974 Mexico City	K-1 4 x 500 m
Silver medal – second place	1973 Tampere	K-2 1000 m
Bronze medal – third place	1973 Tampere	K-2 500 m

Ernst Pavel is a Romanian sprint canoeist who competed in the early 1970s. He won a complete set of medals at the ICF Canoe Sprint World Championships with a gold (K-1 4 x 500 m: 1974), a silver (K-2 1000 m: 1973), and a bronze (K-2 500 m: 1973).
