= Diana Christova =

Bulgarian sprint canoer

Medal record

Women's canoe sprint

World Championships
Bronze medal – third place	1977 Sofia	K-2 500 m

Diana Christova (Bulgarian: Диана Христова) is a Bulgarian sprint canoer who competed in the late 1970s. She won a bronze medal in the K-2 500 m event at the 1977 ICF Canoe Sprint World Championships in Sofia.
