= Sabine Pochert =

Medal record

Women's canoe sprint

World Championships
Silver medal – second place	1977 Sofia	K-4 500 m

Sabine Pochert is an East German sprint canoer who competed in the late 1970s. She won a silver medal in the K-4 500 m (1,600 ft) event at the 1977 ICF Canoe Sprint World Championships in Sofia.
