= William Leach (canoeist) =

American canoeist (born 1946)

William "Bill" Leach (born April 5, 1946) is an American sprint canoer who competed in the late 1970s. At the 1976 Summer Olympics in Montreal, he was eliminated in the repechages of the K-2 500 m event.

Leach's wife, Julie, finished seventh in the K-1 500 m event at those same games and later became a triathlete in the 1980s.
