= Klaus Heinroth =

German canoeist (born 1944)

Klaus Heinroth (born 25 December 1944 in Halle) is an East German sprint canoer who competed in the late 1960s. At the 1968 Summer Olympics in Mexico City, he was eliminated in the semifinals of K-2 1000 m event.
