= Ng Hin Wan =

Ng Hin Wan (born March 19, 1958) is a Hong Kong sprint canoer who competed from the mid-1970s to the mid-1980s. At the 1976 Summer Olympics in Montreal, he was eliminated in the repechages of both the K-2 500 m and the K-2 1000 m events. Eight years later in Los Angeles, Ng was eliminated in the repechages of both the K-1 500 m and the K-4 1000 m events.
