= Paul Gnamia M'Boule =

Ivorian canoeist

Paul Gnamia M'Boule (born April 11, 1938) is an Ivorian sprint canoer who competed in the late 1960s and early 1970s. He was eliminated in the semifinals of the K-2 1000 m event at the 1968 Summer Olympics in Mexico City. Four years later in Munich, M'Boule was eliminated in the repechage round of the same event.
