= N'Gama N'Gama =

Ivorian canoeist

N'Gama N'Gama (sometimes listed as N'Gama, born October 11, 1947) is an Ivorian sprint canoer who competed from the late 1960s to the mid-1980s. He was eliminated in the semifinals of the K-2 1000 m event at the 1968 Summer Olympics in Mexico City. Four years later in Munich, N'Gama was eliminated in the semifinals of the K-1 1000 m event. At his third and final Summer Olympics in Los Angeles, he was eliminated in the repechages of the K-1 500 m event.
