= Antoine Cipriani =

French sprint canoer

Antoine Cipriani (born August 11, 1954) is a French sprint canoer who competed in the late 1970s. At the 1976 Summer Olympics in Montreal, he was eliminated in the semifinals of the K-2 500 m event.
