= Donald Cooper =

New Zealand canoeist (born 1948)

Donald "Don" Cooper (born 11 December 1948) is a New Zealand canoe sprinter who competed in the early to mid-1970s. At the 1972 Summer Olympics in Munich, he was eliminated in the semifinals of the K-1 1000 m and the repechages of the K-2 1000 m event. Four years later in Montreal, Cooper was eliminated in the semifinals of the K-1 1000 m event.
