= Morten Opsahl =

Norwegian sprint canoer (born 1955)

Morten Opsahl (born April 30, 1955) is a Norwegian sprint canoer who competed in the late 1970s. At the 1976 Summer Olympics in Montreal, he was eliminated in the semifinals of the K-2 1000 m event.
