= Gudrun Klaus-Dittmar =

Medal record

Women's canoe sprint

World Championships
Gold medal – first place	1977 Sofia	K-1 500 m
Silver medal – second place	1977 Sofia	K-4 500 m

Gudrun Klaus-Dittmar is an East German sprint canoer who competed in the late 1970s. She won two medals at the 1977 ICF Canoe Sprint World Championships with a gold in the K-1 500 m event and a silver in the K-4 500 m event.
