= Scott Oldershaw =

Canadian canoeist (born 1954)

Scott Oldershaw (born February 23, 1954, in Toronto) is a Canadian sprint kayaker who competed in the mid-1980s. He was eliminated in the semifinals of the K-1 500 m event at the 1984 Summer Olympics in Los Angeles. He later became head coach at the Burloak Canoe Club in Oakville, Ontario, leading them to national titles in 1997, 1998, 2000 and 2007 and coaching Olympic gold medallist Adam van Koeverden and Olympic bronze medalist Mark Oldershaw. He continued his coaching career with the Canadian National Team, and was named national Head Coach in 2012.

He is a son of Bert Oldershaw, brother of Dean Oldershaw and Reed Oldershaw, and father of Mark Oldershaw, all of whom have represented Canada in the Summer Olympics.
