= Andreas Orheim =

Norwegian canoeist

Medal record

Men's canoe sprint

World Championships
Gold medal – first place	1975 Belgrade	K-4 10000 m

Andreas Orheim (born 19 June 1951 in Bærum, Norway) is a Norwegian sprint canoer who competed in the mid-1970s. He won a gold medal in the K-4 10000 m at the 1975 ICF Canoe Sprint World Championships in Belgrade.

Orheim was eliminated in the semifinals of the K-2 1000 m event at the 1976 Summer Olympics in Montreal.

Orheim has won 10 Norwegian championships in paddling and he has between 20 and 30 top 3 results in the Norwegian championship. Most of his podium places was in team boats, but in 1975 he won the classic 10 000 m races in the Norwegian championship all by himself. Andreas Orheim retired from the sport at the age of 25 and he lives in Berum with his two sons Petter and Herman Orheim. He later worked as a gym teacher at Valler High School.

He took his education at the Norwegian School of Sport Sciences.
