= Hermelindo Soto =

Mexican canoeist (born 1949)

Hermelindo Soto (born in Xochimilco, MEXICO on October 28, 1949) is a Mexican sprint kayaker who competed in the early to mid-1970s. At the 1972 Summer Olympics in Munich, he was eliminated in the repechages of both the K-1 1000 m and K-4 1000 m events. Four years later in Montreal, Soto was eliminated in the semifinals of the K-2 500 m event and the repechages of the K-2 1000 m event.
