= José Seguin =

Spanish canoeist

José Seguín (born November 21, 1951) is a Spanish sprint canoer who competed in the late 1970s. At the 1976 Summer Olympics in Montreal, he finished fourth in the K-2 500 m event and fifth in the K-2 1000 m event. He won the bronze medal in the World Championship of Canoeing in 1975 - men's 4 x K1 500 m.
