= Dean Oldershaw =

Canadian sprint canoeist and kayaker (born 1946)

Dean Oldershaw (born August 7, 1946) is a Canadian sprint canoeist and kayaker who competed in the early to mid-1970s. At the 1972 Summer Olympics in Munich, he was eliminated in the semifinals of the K-1 1000 m and K-4 1000 m events. Four years later in Montreal, Oldershaw was eliminated in the semifinals of the K-1 500 m event. Over the course of his competitive career, Oldershaw has won 15 North American Championships and 75 Canadian Championships, a national record until broken by his nephew, Mark Oldershaw in 2019.

Born in Toronto, Ontario, Canada, Oldershaw is a son of Bert Oldershaw, brother of Reed Oldershaw and Scott Oldershaw, and uncle of Mark Oldershaw, all members of Canadian Summer Olympic teams. He has coached at various clubs including being Head Coach at Mississauga, Oakville, Mohawk and Quebec Canoe Clubs. From 1981-1984, Oldershaw was Ontario Team Head Coach. He is a member of both the Mississauga Sports Hall of Fame (athlete) and the Oakville Sports Hall of Fame (coach).
