= Jean-Paul Hanquier =

French canoeist

Medal record

Men's canoe sprint

World Championships
Silver medal – second place	1978 Belgrade	K-2 10000 m

Jean-Paul Hanquier (born May 12, 1953) is a French sprint canoer.

== Career ==
Hanquier competed in the late 1970s. He won a silver medal in the K-2 10000 m event at the 1978 ICF Canoe Sprint World Championships in Belgrade.

Hanquier also competed at the 1976 Summer Olympics in Montreal, finishing fourth in the K-2 1000 m event.
