= Hui Cheong =

Hong Kong sprint canoer

Hui Cheong (Simplified Chinese：许昌，Traditional Chinese：許昌）(born 20 October 1956) is a Hong Kong canoe sprinter who competed from the mid-1970s to the mid-1980s. At the 1976 Summer Olympics in Montreal, he was eliminated in the repechages of both the K-2 500 m and the K-2 1000 m events.
