= Rosa Bohanova =

Bulgarian sprint canoer

Medal record

Women's canoe sprint

World Championships
Gold medal – first place	1977 Sofia	K-4 500 m

Rosa Bohanova is a Bulgarian sprint canoer who competed from the late 1970s. She won a gold medal in the K-4 500 m event at the 1977 ICF Canoe Sprint World Championships in Sofia.
