= Herman Naegels =

Belgian sprint canoer (born 1943)

Herman Naegels (Mechelen, 17 March 1943) is a Belgian canoe sprinter who competed in the late 1960s and early 1970s. Competing in two Summer Olympics, he earned his best finish of seventh in the K-2 1000 m event at Mexico City in 1968.
