= Michael Johnson (canoeist) =

American canoeist (born 1941)

Michael Johnson (born January 27, 1941, in Los Angeles) is an American sprint canoer who competed in the late 1970s. At the 1976 Summer Olympics in Montreal, he was eliminated in the repechages of the K-2 500 m event.
