= Reed Oldershaw =

Canadian sprint kayaker

Reed Oldershaw (born March 7, 1951, in Toronto) is a Canadian sprint kayaker who competed in the late 1970s. He was eliminated in the semifinals of the K-1 1000 m event at the 1976 Summer Olympics in Montreal.

He is a son of Bert Oldershaw, and brother of Dean Oldershaw and Scott Oldershaw, and uncle of Mark Oldershaw, all of whom have also represented Canada in the Summer Olympics.
