= Brendan O'Connell (canoeist) =

Irish canoeist

Brendan O'Connell (born 19 May 1951) is an Irish canoe sprinter who competed in the early to mid-1970s. Competing in two Summer Olympics, he was eliminated in the repechages of all three events he competed (1972: K-2 1000 m, 1976: K-2 500 m, K-4 1000 m). He later became the President of the Irish Canoe Union.
