= David Upson =

British sprint canoer (born 1962)

David Upson (born 14 March 1962) is a British canoe sprinter who competed in the mid-1980s. He finished fifth in the K-1 500 m event at the 1984 Summer Olympics in Los Angeles.
