= Henryk Budzicz =

Polish sprint canoer

Medal record

Men's canoe sprint

World Championships
Gold medal – first place	1977 Sofia	K-4 500 m
Gold medal – first place	1977 Sofia	K-4 1000 m

Henryk Budzicz (born 11 June 1953 in Olsztyn) is a Polish canoe sprinter who competed from the late 1970s. He won two gold medals at the 1977 ICF Canoe Sprint World Championships in Sofia, earning them in the K-4 500 m and K-4 1000 m events.

Budzicz also finished fifth in the K-4 1000 m event at the 1976 Summer Olympics in Montreal.
