= Maria Ivanov =

Romanian sprint canoer

Medal record

Women's canoe sprint

World Championships
Bronze medal – third place	1973 Tampere	K-4 500 m

Maria Ivanov is a Romanian sprint canoer who competed in the early 1970s. She won a bronze medal in the K-4 500 m event at the 1973 ICF Canoe Sprint World Championships in Tampere.
