= Géza Kralován =

Hungarian canoeist (1946–2025)

Medal record

Men's canoe sprint

World Championships
Gold medal – first place	1973 Tampere	K-4 10000 m

Géza Kralován (8 June 1946 – 19 January 2025) was a Hungarian sprint canoer who competed in the early to mid-1970s. He won a gold medal in the K-4 10000 m at the 1973 ICF Canoe Sprint World Championships in Tampere. Kralován died on 19 January 2025, at the age of 78.
