= Róbert Schaffhauser =

Hungarian sprint canoer

Medal record

Men's canoe sprint

World Championships
Silver medal – second place	1973 Tampere	K-1 4 x 500 m

Róbert Schaffhauser was a Hungarian sprint canoer who competed in the early 1970s. He won a silver medal in the K-1 4 x 500 m event at the 1973 ICF Canoe Sprint World Championships in Tampere.
