= Taisiya Laptyeva =

Medal record

Women's canoe sprint

World Championships
Bronze medal – third place	1977 Sofia	K-4 500 m

Taisiya Laptyeva is a Soviet sprint canoer who competed in the late 1970s. She won a bronze medal in the K-4 500 m event at the 1977 ICF Canoe Sprint World Championships in Sofia.
