= Kari Markkanen =

Finnish canoeist

Kari Seppo Juhani Markkanen (born January 8, 1952, in Espoo) is a Finnish sprint canoer who competed in the early to mid-1970s. Competing in two Summer Olympics, he earned his best finish of sixth in the K-2 500 m event at Montreal in 1976.
