= Juan Bostelmann =

Mexican sprint canoer (born 1954)

Juan Bostelmann Willerer (born February 13, 1954) is a Mexican sprint canoer who competed in the late 1970s. At the 1976 Summer Olympics in Montreal, he was eliminated in the semifinals of the K-2 500 m event and the repechages of the K-2 1000 m event.
