= Atilio Vásquez =

Argentine canoeist (born 1959)

Personal information
- Full name: Atilio César Vásquez
- Born: 9 November 1959 (age 66)
- Height: 175 cm (5 ft 9 in)
- Weight: 80 kg (176 lb)

Sport
- Sport: Canoe sprint
- Event: K-1
Medal record
Representing Argentina
Pan American Games
Bronze medal – third place	1987 Indianapolis	K-1 1000m

Atilio César Vásquez (born 9 November 1959) is an Argentine sprint kayaker. He competed in the mid to late 1980s.

At the 1984 Summer Olympics in Los Angeles, Vásquez was eliminated in the semifinals of both the K-1 500 m and K-1 1000 m events. Four years later in Seoul, he was eliminated in the repechages of the K-1 1000 m event.
