= Zdislav Soroko =

Medal record

Men's canoe sprint

World Championships
Bronze medal – third place	1977 Sofia	C-1 500 m

Zdislav Soroko is a Soviet sprint canoer who competed in the late 1970s. He won a bronze medal in the C-1 500 m event at the 1977 ICF Canoe Sprint World Championships in Sofia.
