= Berndt Andersson =

Swedish canoeist

Berndt Andersson (born 12 November 1951) is a Swedish sprint canoer who competed from the early 1970s to the early 1980s. Competing in three Summer Olympics, he earned his best finish of sixth in the K-1 1000 m event at Montreal in 1976. He came 5th in Munich 1972 and 9th in Moscow 1980.
