= Steve King (canoeist) =

Canadian canoeist

Steve King (born September 4, 1952 in Montreal) is a Canadian sprint canoeist who competed in the late 1970s. At the 1976 Summer Olympics in Montreal, he finished eighth in the K-2 1000 m event while being eliminated in the semifinals of the K-2 500 m event.
