= Bruno Bicocchi =

French sprint canoer

Bruno Bicocchi (8 June 1955 – 19 May 2021) was a French sprint canoer who competed in the late 1970s. At the 1976 Summer Olympics in Montreal, he was eliminated in the semifinals of the K-2 500 m event.
