= Erzsébet Horváth =

Hungarian canoeist

Medal record

Women's canoe sprint

World Championships
| Silver medal – second place | 1973 Tampere | K-4 500 m |

Erzsébet Horváth (born 1953) is a Hungarian canoe sprinter who competed in the early 1970s. She won a silver medal in the K-4 500 m event at the 1973 ICF Canoe Sprint World Championships Tampere.
