= Beniami Borbandi =

Romanian sprint canoer

Medal record

Men's canoe sprint

World Championships
Silver medal – second place	1977 Sofia	K-4 500 m

Beniami Borbandi is a Romanian sprint canoer who competed in the late 1970s. He won a silver medal in the K-4 500 m event at the 1977 ICF Canoe Sprint World Championships in Sofia.
