= 1977 ICF Canoe Sprint World Championships =

International canoe event

The 1977 Canoe Sprint World Championships were held in Sofia, Bulgaria.

The men's competition consisted of six Canadian (single paddle, open boat) and nine kayak events. Three events were held for the women, all in kayak. The men's K-1 4 x 500 m relay was discontinued at these championships and replaced by the men's K-4 500 m event.

This was the thirteenth championships in canoe sprint.

== Medal summary ==
=== Men's ===
==== Canoe ====
Event	Gold	Time	Silver	Time	Bronze	Time
C-1 500 m	Lipat Varabiev (ROU)		Ulrich Eicke (GER)		Zdislav Soroko (URS)	
C-1 1000 m	Ivan Patzaichin (ROU)		Sergey Antipov (URS)		Tamás Buday (HUN)	
C-1 10000 m	Tamás Wichmann (HUN)		Vasiliy Yurchenko (URS)		Ivan Patzaichin (ROU)	
C-2 500 m	Hungary; László Foltán; István Vaskúti		Canada; John Wood; Gregory Smith		Soviet Union; Vasyl Yurchenko; Yuri Lobanov	
C-2 1000 m	Soviet Union; Vasyl Yurchenko; Yuri Lobanov		Hungary; Tamás Buday; Oszkár Frey		Poland; Jerzy Opara; Andrzej Gronowicz	
C-2 10000 m	Soviet Union; Sergey Petrenko; Yuri Lobanov		Romania; Lipat Varabiev; Pavel Cozlov		Hungary; Zoltán Parti; András Hubik	

==== Kayak ====
Event	Gold	Time	Silver	Time	Bronze	Time
K-1 500 m	Vasile Dîba (ROU)		Grzegorz Śledziewski (POL)		Zoltán Sztanity (HUN)	
K-1 1000 m	Vasile Dîba (ROU)		Rüdiger Helm (GDR)		Oreste Perri (ITA)	
K-1 10000 m	Oreste Perri (ITA)		István Fábián (HUN)		Nikolay Stepanenko (URS)	
K-2 500 m	East Germany; Joachim Mattern; Bernd Olbricht		Soviet Union; Viktor Vorobiyev; Nikolay Astapkovich		Hungary; Géza Csapó; József Svidró	
K-2 1000 m	Hungary; Zoltán Bakó; István Szabó		East Germany; Bernd Olbricht; Joachim Mattern		Soviet Union; Vladimir Romanovsky; Sergei Nagornyi	
K-2 10000 m	Soviet Union; Petras Šiurskas; Anatoliy Korolkov		Hungary; Zoltán Bakó; István Szabó		Romania; Nicolae Țicu; Cuprian Macarencu	
K-4 500 m	Poland; Ryszard Oborski; Daniel Wełna; Grzegorz Kołtan; Henryk Budzicz		Romania; Ion Dragulschi; Beniami Borbandi; Policarp Malîhin; Vasilie Simiocenco		Spain; Herminio Menéndez; Martin Vázquez; José Ramón López; Luis Gregorio Ramos	
K-4 1000 m	Poland; Ryszard Oborski; Daniel Wełna; Grzegorz Kołtan; Henryk Budzicz		Soviet Union; Aleksandr Shaparenko; Vladimir Morozov; Sergey Nikolskiy; Aleksandr Avdeyev		Spain; Herminio Rodriguez; José María Esteban; José Ramón López; Luis Gregorio Ramos	
K-4 10000 m	Soviet Union; Aleksandr Shaparenko; Vladimir Morozov; Sergey Nikolskiy; Aleksandr Avdeyev		Hungary; Csaba Giczy; János Rátkai; István Joós; Iván Herczeg		Poland; Andrzej Klimaszewski; Krzysztof Lepianka; Zbigniew Torzecki; Zdzisław Szubski	

=== Women's ===
==== Kayak ====
Event	Gold	Time	Silver	Time	Bronze	Time
K-1 500 m	Gudrun Klaus-Dittmar (GDR)		Maria Cosma (ROU)		Tatyana Korzhunova (URS)	
K-2 500 m	East Germany; Marion Rösiger; Martina Fischer		Romania; Agafia Orlov; Natasia Nichitov		Bulgaria; Vania Gescheva; Diana Christova	
K-4 500 m	Bulgaria; Maria Mintscheva; Rosa Bohanova; Velitscha Mintscheva; Natascha Janakieva		East Germany; Marion Rösiger; Martina Fischer; Sabine Pochert; Gudrun Klaus-Dittmar		Soviet Union; Taisiya Lapteyeva; Galina Zhikareva; Tatyana Korzhunova; Nina Doroh	

== Medals table ==
Rank	Nation	Gold	Silver	Bronze	Total
1	Soviet Union (URS)	4	4	6	14
2	Romania (ROU)	4	4	2	10
3	Hungary (HUN)	3	4	4	11
4	East Germany (GDR)	3	3	0	6
5	Poland (POL)	2	1	2	5
6	Bulgaria (BUL)	1	0	1	2
6	Italy (ITA)	1	0	1	2
8	Canada (CAN)	0	1	0	1
8	West Germany (FRG)	0	1	0	1
10	Spain (ESP)	0	0	2	2
Totals (10 entries)		18	18	18	54
