= István Timár =

Medal record

Men's canoe sprint

Representing Hungary

Olympic Games
Silver medal – second place	1968 Mexico City	K-2 1000 m
Bronze medal – third place	1968 Mexico City	K-4 1000 m

World Championships
Gold medal – first place	1963 Jajce	K-2 10000 m
Gold medal – first place	1963 Jajce	K-4 10000 m
Silver medal – second place	1971 Belgrade	K-4 10000 m
Bronze medal – third place	1970 Copenhagen	K-4 1000 m

István Timár-Geng (7 January 1940 – 4 December 1994) was a Hungarian sprint canoer who competed from the mid-1960s to the early 1970s. At the 1968 Summer Olympics in Mexico City, he won two medals with a silver in the K-2 1000 m and a bronze in the K-4 1000 m events.

Timár-Geng also won four medals at the ICF Canoe Sprint World Championships with two gold (K-2 10000 m and K-4 10000 m: both 1963), a silver (K-4 10000 m: 1971), and a bronze (K-4 1000 m: 1970).
