= Alonso Heinze =

Mexican canoeist (born 1948)

Alonso Heinze Hauser (born February 15, 1948) is a Mexican sprint canoer who competed in the late 1960s. At the 1968 Summer Olympics in Mexico City, he was eliminated in the repechages of the K-2 1000 m event.
