= Oleg Zhegoyev =

Soviet canoeist

Medal record

Men's canoe sprint

World Championships
Gold medal – first place	1973 Tampere	K-1 4 x 500 m

Oleg Zhegoyev is a Soviet sprint canoer who competed in the early 1970s. He won a gold medal in the K-1 4 x 500 m event at the 1973 ICF Canoe Sprint World Championships in Tampere.
