= Manfred Ehrhardt =

East German sprint canoer (born 1946)

Manfred Erhardt (born 5 September 1946 in Magdeburg) is an East German sprint canoer who competed in the late 1960s. At the 1968 Summer Olympics in Mexico City, he was eliminated in the semifinals of the K-2 1000 m event.
