= Douglas Parnham =

British canoeist

Douglas Robert "Doug" Parnham (born 23 July 1951) is a British canoe sprinter who competed from the early 1970s to the early 1980s. Competing in three Summer Olympics, he earned his best finish of seventh in the K-1 1000 m event at Montreal in 1976. He then went on to coach rowing, as of 2018, he coaches Emanuel School Boat Club.
