= Ion Dragulschi =

Romanian sprint canoeist

Medal record

Men's canoe sprint

World Championships
Silver medal – second place	1973 Tampere	K-2 1000 m
Silver medal – second place	1975 Belgrade	K-1 4 x 500 m
Silver medal – second place	1977 Sofia	K-4 500 m
Bronze medal – third place	1973 Tampere	K-2 500 m

Ion Dragulschi (born April 15, 1950) is a Romanian sprint canoeist who competed in the 1970s. He won four medals at the ICF Canoe Sprint World Championships with three silvers (K-1 4 x 500 m: 1975, K-2 1000 m: 1973, K-4 500 m: 1977) and a bronze (K-2 500 m: 1973).

Dragulschi also competed in the K-1 1000 m event at the 1972 Summer Olympics in Munich, but was eliminated in the semifinals.
