= Ryszard Tylewski =

Polish canoeist (born 1952)

Ryszard Tylewski (born 24 February 1952 in Skwierzyna) is a Polish sprint canoer who competed in the mid-1970s. He was eliminated in the semifinals of the K-2 1000 m event at the 1976 Summer Olympics in Montreal.
