= Csaba Giczy =

Hungarian canoeist (born 1945)

Medal record

Men's canoe sprint

Olympic Games
Silver medal – second place	1968 Mexico City	K-2 1000 m
Bronze medal – third place	1968 Mexico City	K-4 1000 m

World Championships
Gold medal – first place	1971 Belgrade	K-1 4 x 500 m
Gold medal – first place	1973 Tampere	K-4 1000 m
Gold medal – first place	1973 Tampere	K-4 10000 m
Silver medal – second place	1971 Belgrade	K-4 10000 m
Silver medal – second place	1974 Mexico City	K-4 10000 m
Silver medal – second place	1977 Sofia	K-4 10000 m
Bronze medal – third place	1970 Copenhagen	K-4 1000 m
Bronze medal – third place	1974 Mexico City	K-4 1000 m

Csaba Giczy (born 5 August 1945) is a Hungarian canoe sprinter who competed from the late 1960s to the late 1970s. Competing in two Summer Olympics, he won two medals at Mexico City in 1968 with a silver in the K-2 1000 m and a bronze in the K-4 1000 m events.

Giczy also won eight medals at the ICF Canoe Sprint World Championships with three golds (K-1 4 x 500 m: 1971, K-4 1000 m: 1973, K-4 10000 m: 1973), three silvers (K-4 10000 m: 1971, 1974, 1977), and two bronzes (K-4 1000 m: 1970, 1974).
