= Hans Mayr (canoeist) =

Austrian canoeist (born 1944)

Hans Peter Mayr (born 27 November 1944 in Lenzing) is an Austrian sprint canoer who competed in the late 1970s and early 1980s. He was eliminated in the semifinals of the K-2 1000 m event at the 1976 Summer Olympics in Montreal. Four years later in Moscow, Mayr was eliminated in the semifinals of the K-4 1000 m event.
