= Mak Chi Wai =

Hong Kong sprint canoer (born 1937)

Mak Chi Wai (born January 29, 1937) is a Hong Kong sprint canoer who competed in the late 1970s. He was eliminated in the repechages of both the K-1 1000 m and the K-4 1000 m events at the 1976 Summer Olympics in Montreal.
