= Rod Gavin =

New Zealand canoeist

Roderick Fitzgerald Gavin (born 20 May 1949) is a New Zealand sprint canoeist who competed in the late 1970s. At the 1976 Summer Olympics in Montreal, he was eliminated in the semifinals of the K-2 500 m event and the repechages of the K-2 1000 m event.
