= Peter Deyo =

American sprint canoeist (born 1957)

Peter Deyo (born September 29, 1957) is an American sprint canoer who competed in the late 1970s. At the 1976 Summer Olympics in Montreal, he was eliminated in the semifinals of K-2 1000 m event and the repechages of the K-4 1000 m event.
