= Patrick Genestier =

French canoeist (born 1954)

Patrick Genestier (born June 1, 1954) is a French sprint canoer who competed in the late 1970s. He was eliminated in the semifinals of the K-1 1000 m event at the 1976 Summer Olympics in Montreal.
