= Ľubor Štark =

Czechoslovak sprint canoer (1953–2022)

Ľubor Štark (28 January 1953 – 8 May 2022) was a Czechoslovak sprint canoeist who competed in the late 1970s. He finished ninth in the K-1 1000 m event at the 1976 Summer Olympics in Montreal. He was born in Nitra.
