= 1973 ICF Canoe Sprint World Championships =

Canoeing competition in Tampere, Finland

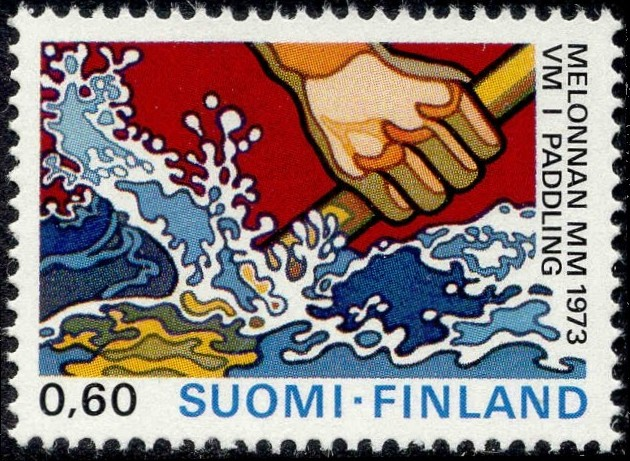
A Finnish stamp dedicated to the 1973 ICF Canoe Sprint World Championships

The 1973 ICF Canoe Sprint World Championships were held in lake Kaukajärvi, Tampere, Finland. Kaukajärvi Canoe/Kayak venue on map..

The men's competition consisted of six Canadian (single paddle, open boat) and nine kayak events. Three events were held for the women, all in kayak.

This was the tenth championships in canoe sprint.

== Medal summary ==
=== Men's ===
==== Canoe ====
Event	Gold	Time	Silver	Time	Bronze	Time
C-1 500 m	Miklós Darvas (HUN)		Nikolay Fedulov (URS)		Ivan Patzaichin (ROU)	
C-1 1000 m	Ivan Patzaichin (ROU)		Romualdas Vinojinidis (URS)		Tamás Wichmann (HUN)	
C-1 10000 m	Vasiliy Yurchenko (URS)		Lipat Varabiev (ROU)		Tamás Wichmann (HUN)	
C-2 500 m	Soviet Union; Oleg Kalidov; Vitaliy Slobodenyuk		Romania; Gheorghe Danielov; Gheorghe Simionov		Poland; Jerzy Opara; Andrzej Gronowicz	
C-2 1000 m	Romania; Gheorghe Danielov; Gheorghe Simionov		Soviet Union; Vladas Česiūnas; Yuri Lobanov		Hungary; Tamás Wichmann; Gyula Petrikovics	
C-2 10000 m	Soviet Union; Vladas Česiūnas; Yuri Lobanov		Romania; Vasile Serghei; Cherasim Munteanu		Hungary; Tamás Buday; Gábor Haraszti	

==== Kayak ====
Event	Gold	Time	Silver	Time	Bronze	Time
K-1 500 m	Géza Csapó (HUN)		Vitaliy Trukshin (URS)		Grzegorz Śledziewski (POL)	
K-1 1000 m	Géza Csapó (HUN)		Grzegorz Śledziewski (POL)		Aleksandr Shaparenko (URS)	
K-1 10000 m	Aleksandr Shaparenko (URS)		Péter Völgyi (HUN)		Jörgen Andersen (DEN)	
K-1 4 x 500 m relay	Soviet Union; Vitaliy Trukshin; Anatoliy Kobrisev; Sergey Nikolskiy; Oleg Zhegoyev		Hungary; István Csizmadia; Zoltán Angyal; Róbert Schaffhauser; István Szabó		Romania; Atanase Sciotnic; Vasilie Simiocenco; Roman Vartolomeu; Mihai Zafiu	
K-2 500 m	Soviet Union; Nikolay Gogol; Pytor Greshta		Hungary; József Deme; János Rátkai		Romania; Ion Dragulschi; Ernst Pavel	
K-2 1000 m	Hungary; József Deme; János Rátkai		Romania; Ion Dragulschi; Ernst Pavel		East Germany; Herbert Laabs; Joachim Mattern	
K-2 10000 m	Hungary; Zoltán Bakó; Géza Csapó		Romania; Ion Terente; Antrop Variabev		Belgium; Jos Broekx; Paul Stinckens	
K-4 1000 m	Hungary; József Deme; János Rátkai; Csongor Vargha; Csaba Giczy		Soviet Union; Yuri Filatov; Vladimir Morozov; Nikolay Gogol; Valeri Didenko		East Germany; Norbert Paschke; Peter Korsch; Jürgen Lehnert; Harald Marg	
K-4 10000 m	Hungary; Csaba Giczy; Tibor Nagy; Csongor Vargha; Géza Kralován		West Germany; Hans-Erich Pasch; Horst Mattern; Rudolf Blass; Eberhard Fischer		Romania; Atanase Sciotnic; Cuprian Macarencu; Costel Coșniță; Vasilie Simiocenco	

=== Women's ===
==== Kayak ====
Event	Gold	Time	Silver	Time	Bronze	Time
K-1 500 m	Nina Gopova (URS)		Petra Borzym (GDR)		Victoria Dumitru (ROU)	
K-2 500 m	East Germany; Ilse Kaschube; Petra Borzym		Soviet Union; Lyudmila Pinayeva; Nina Gopova		Hungary; Anna Pfeffer; Ilona Tőzsér	
K-4 500 m	Soviet Union; Lyudmila Pinayeva; Nina Gopova; Larissa Kabakova; Tamara Popova		Hungary; Anna Pfeffer; Ilona Tőzsér; Erzsébet Horváth; Mária Zakariás		Romania; Victoria Dumitru; Maria Nichiforov; Maria Cosma; Maria Ivanov	

== Medals table ==
Rank	Nation	Gold	Silver	Bronze	Total
1	Soviet Union (URS)	8	6	1	15
2	Hungary (HUN)	7	4	5	16
3	Romania (ROU)	2	5	6	13
4	East Germany (GDR)	1	1	2	4
5	Poland (POL)	0	1	2	3
6	West Germany (FRG)	0	1	0	1
7	Belgium (BEL)	0	0	1	1
7	Denmark (DEN)	0	0	1	1
Totals (8 entries)		18	18	18	54
