= Edicto Gilbert =

Cuban canoeist (born 1945)

Edicto Gilbert Morejon (born May 13, 1945) is a Cuban sprint canoer who competed in the early 1970s. At the 1972 Summer Olympics in Munich, he was eliminated in the semifinals of the K-1 1000 m event and the repechages of the K-2 1000 m event.
