= Serhei Nahorny =

Soviet sprint canoeist

Medal record

Men's canoe sprint

Olympic Games
Gold medal – first place	1976 Montreal	K-2 1000 m
Silver medal – second place	1976 Montreal	K-2 500 m

World Championships
Bronze medal – third place	1977 Sofia	K-2 1000 m
Bronze medal – third place	1979 Duisburg	K-4 1000 m

Serhiy Nahorniy (born December 8, 1956) is a Soviet sprint canoeist who competed from the late 1970s and the early 1980s. Competing in two Summer Olympics, he won two medals at Montreal in 1976 with a gold in the K-2 1000 m and a silver in the K-2 500 m events.

Nahorny also won two bronze medals at the ICF Canoe Sprint World Championships, earning them in the K-2 1000 m (1977) and K-4 1000 m (1979) events.
