= Norman Mason (canoeist) =

British canoeist

Norman Mason (born 23 July 1952) is a maths teacher in Leicester at Wyggeston and Queen Elizabeth I College, and was a British canoe sprinter who competed in the mid-1970s. He was eliminated in the repechages of the K-2 1000 m event at the 1976 Summer Olympics in Montreal.

== Early life ==
He grew up at 60 St Mary's Crescent in Ruddington. He attended the University of Bristol.

== Career ==
In 1976 he taught Maths at Burleigh School in Loughborough.

== Personal life ==
He later lived in Keyworth.

Games	Age	City	Sport	Event	Partner	Team	NOC	Date	Rank
1976 Summer	23	Montréal	Canoeing	Men's Kayak Doubles, 1,000 metres	Stephen Brown	Great Britain	GBR	1976-07-29	4 h3 r2/4
