= Giorgio Sbruzzi =

Italian canoeist (born 1955)

Medal record

Men's canoe sprint

World Championships
Silver medal – second place	1975 Belgrade	K-2 10000 m

Giorgio Sbruzzi (born 13 March 1955) is an Italian sprint canoer who competed from the mid to late 1970s. He won a silver medal in the K-2 10000 m event at the 1975 ICF Canoe Sprint World Championships in Belgrade.

Sbruzzi also competed in the K-2 1000 m event at the 1976 Summer Olympics in Montreal, but was eliminated in the semifinal round.
