= David Gilman (athlete) =

American luger and canoeist

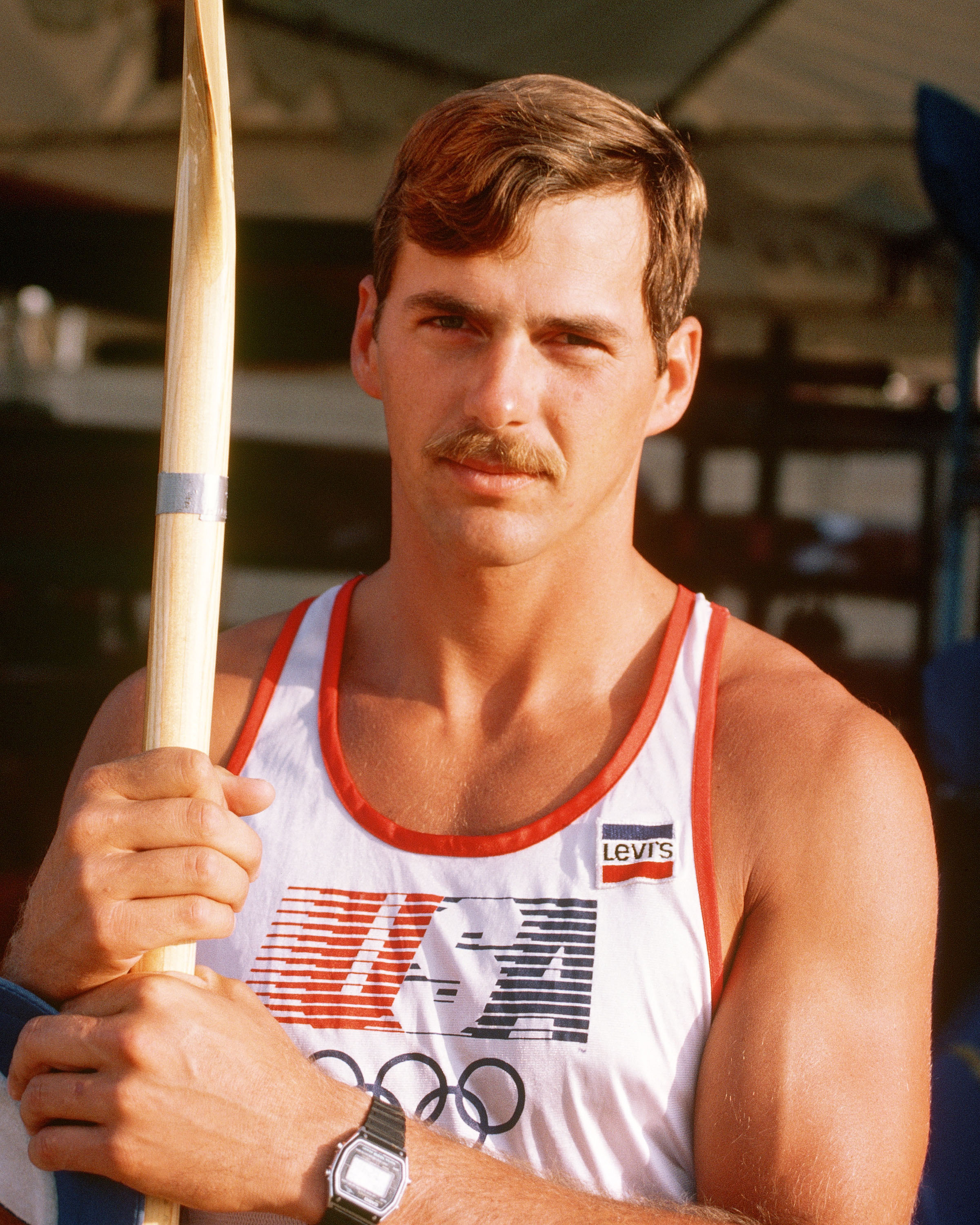
- Gilman in 1984

Personal information
- Nationality: American
- Born: December 6, 1954 (age 71)

Sport
- Sport: luger and sprint canoer

Achievements and titles
- Olympic finals: competed in: Canoe: 1976 Summer Olympics, 1984 Summer Olympics; Luge: 1984 Winter Olympics

David Gilman (born December 6, 1954) is an American luger and sprint canoer who competed in the late 1970s and early 1980s. As a sprint canoer, he was eliminated in the semifinals of the K-1 1000 m event at the 1976 Summer Olympics in Montreal. Eight years later in Los Angeles, Gilman was eliminated in the repechages of the K-4 1000 m event.

Gilman also finished 17th in the men's singles luge event at the 1984 Winter Olympics in Sarajevo.
