= Vitaliy Slobodenyuk =

Medal record

Men's canoe sprint

World Championships
Gold medal – first place	1973 Tampere	C-2 500 m

Vitaliy Slobodenyuk is a Soviet sprint canoeist who competed in the early 1970s. He won a gold medal in the C-2 500 m event at the 1973 ICF Canoe Sprint World Championships in Tampere.
