= Bernadette Brégeon =

French canoeist

Medal record

Women's canoe sprint

World Championships
Bronze medal – third place	1991 Paris	K-2 5000 m

Bernadette Brégeon-Hettich (born February 8, 1964) is a French sprint canoer who competed from the mid-1980s to the early 1990s. She was born Hettich and married the canoer Bernard Brégeon.

She won a bronze medal in the K-2 5000 m event at the 1991 ICF Canoe Sprint World Championships in Paris. Brégeon-Hettich also competed in two Summer Olympics, earning her best finish of sixth in the K-2 500 m event at Los Angeles in 1984.

She is married to fellow canoer Bernard Brégeon.
