= Tibor Nagy (canoeist) =

Hungarian canoeist

Medal record

Men's canoe sprint

World Championships
Gold medal – first place	1973 Tampere	K-4 10000 m

Tibor Nagy is a Hungarian sprint canoer who competed in the early to mid-1970s. He won a gold medal in the K-4 10000 m at the 1973 ICF Canoe Sprint World Championships in Tampere.
