= Bernard Brégeon =

French canoeist (born 1962)

Medal record

Men's canoe sprint

Olympic Games
Silver medal – second place	1984 Los Angeles	K-2 1000 m
Bronze medal – third place	1984 Los Angeles	K-1 500 m

World Championships
Gold medal – first place	1982 Belgrade	K-2 10000 m
Silver medal – second place	1986 Montreal	K-1 10000 m
Bronze medal – third place	1985 Mechlen	K-1 500 m

Bernard Brégeon (born 6 July 1962) is a French sprint canoeist who competed in the 1980s. Competing in two Summer Olympics, he won two medals at Los Angeles in 1984 with a silver in the K-2 1000 m and a bronze in the K-1 500 m events.

Brégeon also won a complete set of medals at the ICF Canoe Sprint World Championships with a gold (K-2 10000 m: 1982), a silver (K-1 10000 m: 1986) and a bronze (K-1 500 m: 1985).

He is married to fellow canoer Bernadette Brégeon.
