= Bernd Olbricht =

East German sprint canoeist (born 1956)

Medal record

Men's canoe sprint

Olympic Games
Gold medal – first place	1976 Montreal	K-2 500 m
Gold medal – first place	1980 Moscow	K-4 1000 m
Silver medal – second place	1976 Montreal	K-2 1000 m
Bronze medal – third place	1980 Moscow	K-2 500 m

World Championships
Gold medal – first place	1977 Sofia	K-2 500 m
Gold medal – first place	1978 Belgrade	K-2 500 m
Gold medal – first place	1978 Belgrade	K-4 1000 m
Gold medal – first place	1979 Duisburg	K-4 1000 m
Silver medal – second place	1977 Sofia	K-2 1000 m
Silver medal – second place	1979 Duisburg	K-2 500 m

Bernd Olbricht (born 17 October 1956 in Gnoien) is an East German sprint canoeist who competed in the late 1970s and early 1980s. Competing in two Summer Olympics, he won four medals with two golds (1976: K-2 500 m, 1980: K-4 1000 m), one silver (1976: K-2 1000 m), and one bronze (1980: K-2 500 m).

Olbricht also won six medals at the ICF Canoe Sprint World Championships with four golds (K-2 500 m: 1977, 1978; K-4 1000 m: 1978, 1979) and two silvers (K-2 500 m: 1979, K-2 1000 m: 1977).
