= József Deme =

Hungarian canoeist (born 1951)

Medal record

Men's canoe sprint

Olympic Games
Silver medal – second place	1972 Munich	K-2 1000 m

World Championships
Gold medal – first place	1973 Tampere	K-2 1000 m
Gold medal – first place	1973 Tampere	K-4 1000 m
Silver medal – second place	1973 Tampere	K-2 500 m
Silver medal – second place	1974 Mexico City	K-2 500 m
Bronze medal – third place	1974 Mexico City	K-4 1000 m
Bronze medal – third place	1975 Belgrade	K-2 1000 m
Bronze medal – third place	1975 Belgrade	K-4 1000 m

József Deme (born 11 December 1951) is a Hungarian sprint canoeist who competed from the early 1970s to the early 1980s. Competing in three Summer Olympics, he won a silver medal in the K-2 1000 m event at Munich in 1972.

Deme also won seven medals at the ICF Canoe Sprint World Championships with two golds (K-2 1000 m and K-4 1000 m: both 1973), two silvers (K-2 500 m: 1973, 1974), and three bronzes (K-2 1000 m: 1975, K-4 1000 m: 1974, 1975).
