= Vladimir Romanovsky =

Soviet sprint canoeist (1957–2013)

Medal record

Men's canoe sprint

Olympic Games
Gold medal – first place	1976 Montreal	K-2 1000 m
Silver medal – second place	1976 Montreal	K-2 500 m

World Championships
Gold medal – first place	1981 Nottingham	K-2 10000 m
Gold medal – first place	1982 Belgrade	K-4 10000 m
Bronze medal – third place	1977 Sofia	K-2 1000 m

Vladimir Romanovsky (June 21, 1957 in Slonim, Belarusian SSR – May 13, 2013) was a Soviet sprint canoeist who competed in the late 1970s and early 1980s. He won two medals at the 1976 Summer Olympics in Montreal with a gold in the K-2 1000 m and a silver in the K-2 500 m events.

Romanovsky also won three medals at the ICF Canoe Sprint World Championships with two golds (K-2 10000 m: 1981, K-4 10000 m: 1982) and a bronze (K-2 1000 m: 1977).
