= Dylan Bregeon =

French boxer

Personal information
- Nationality: French
- Born: 24 February 1994 (age 32) Nantes, France
- Weight: Cruiserweight

Boxing career
- Stance: Southpaw

Boxing record
- Total fights: 21
- Wins: 14
- Win by KO: 3
- Losses: 6
- Draws: 1
Medal record
Men's amateur boxing
Representing France
Summer Universiade
| Bronze medal – third place | 2013 Kazan | -91 kg |

Dylan Bregeon (born February 1994) is a French professional boxer. As an amateur he won a bronze medal at the 2013 Universiade. As a pro he won a French cruiserweight title against Olivier Vautrain.
