= Hannu Kojo =

Finnish canoeist (born 1953)

Hannu Kojo (born July 30, 1953 in Mikkeli) is a Finnish sprint canoer who competed in the late 1970s and early 1980s. Competing in two Summer Olympics, he earned his best finish of sixth in the K-2 500 m event at Montreal in 1976.
