= Ian Pringle (canoeist) =

Irish canoeist

Personal information
- Nationality: Irish
- Born: January 17, 1953 (age 73)

Ian Pringle (born 17 January 1953) is an Irish sprint canoeist who competed from the mid-1970s to the mid-1980s. He was eliminated in the repechages of both the K-2 1000 m and the K-4 1000 m events at the 1976 Summer Olympics in Montreal. Four years later in Moscow, Pringle was eliminated in the repechages of the K-1 1000 m event. At his third and final Summer Olympics in Los Angeles, he was eliminated in semifinals of both the K-1 500 m and the K-1 1000 m events.
