= Anatoliy Korolkov =

Soviet sprint canoer

Medal record

Men's canoe sprint

World Championships
Gold medal – first place	1977 Sofia	K-2 10000 m

Anatoliy Korolkov was a Soviet sprint canoer who competed in the late 1970s. He won a gold medal in the K-2 10000 m event at the 1977 ICF Canoe Sprint World Championships in Sofia.
