= Bert Oldershaw =

Canadian canoeist

Herbert "Bert" Oldershaw (November 10, 1921 in Toronto – March 28, 2006 in Burlington, Ontario) was a Canadian sprint canoeist and sprint kayaker who competed from the late 1940s to the late 1950s.Bert was a founding member of the Toronto Island Canoe Club. Competing in three Summer Olympics, he earned his best finish of fifth in the C-2 10000 m event at London in 1948. Bert's partner was Bill Stevenson.

Oldershaw was inducted into the Canadian Olympic Hall of Fame in 2004 in both athlete and builder categories.

He is a father of Dean Oldershaw, Reed Oldershaw and Scott Oldershaw and grandfather of Mark Oldershaw, all of whom competed for Canada in the Olympics. Mark Oldershaw won a bronze medal for Canada at the 2012 Olympic Games in London, 64 years after his grandfather Bert competed there.
