= Mauro Chiostri =

Italian sprint canoer (born 1948)

Mauro Chiostri (born 19 July 1948) is an Italian sprint canoer who competed in the early 1970s. At the 1972 Summer Olympics in Munich, he was eliminated in the repechages of both the K-1 1000 m event.
