= Aleksandr Shaparenko =

Ukrainian sprint canoeist (born 1946)

Medal record

Men's canoe sprint

Olympic Games
| Gold medal – first place | 1968 Mexico City | K-2 1000 m |
| Gold medal – first place | 1972 Munich | K-1 1000 m |
| Silver medal – second place | 1968 Mexico City | K-1 1000 m |

World Championships
| Gold medal – first place | 1966 East Berlin | K-1 1000 m |
| Gold medal – first place | 1966 East Berlin | K-2 1000 m |
| Gold medal – first place | 1970 Copenhagen | K-1 1000 m |
| Gold medal – first place | 1973 Tampere | K-1 10000 m |
| Gold medal – first place | 1977 Sofia | K-4 10000 m |
| Gold medal – first place | 1978 Belgrade | K-4 10000 m |
| Gold medal – first place | 1979 Duisburg | K-4 10000 m |
| Silver medal – second place | 1974 Mexico City | K-1 10000 m |
| Silver medal – second place | 1977 Sofia | K-4 1000 m |
| Bronze medal – third place | 1966 East Berlin | K-4 1000 m |
| Bronze medal – third place | 1971 Belgrade | K-1 1000 m |
| Bronze medal – third place | 1973 Tampere | K-1 1000 m |
| Bronze medal – third place | 1979 Duisburg | K-4 1000 m |

Aleksandr Shaparenko (sometimes shown as Aleksandr Shaporenko, born 16 February 1946) is a Soviet-born Ukrainian sprint canoeist who competed from the late 1960s to the late 1970s. Competing in three Summer Olympics, he won three medals with two golds (1968: K-2 1000 m, 1972: K-1 1000 m) and one silver (1968: K-1 1000 m).

Shaparenko also won 13 medals at the ICF Canoe Sprint World Championships with seven golds (K-1 1000 m: 1966, 1970; K-1 10000 m: 1973, K-2 1000 m: 1966, K-4 10000 m: 1977, 1978, 1979), two silvers (K-1 10000 m: 1974, K-4 1000 m: 1974), and four bronzes (K-1 1000 m: 1971, 1973; K-4 1000 m: 1966, 1979).
