= Denis Barré =

Canadian canoeist

Denis Barré (born February 4, 1948, in Lachine) is a Canadian sprint canoer who competed in the 1970s. Competing in two Summer Olympics, he earned his best finish of eighth in the K-2 1000 m event at Montreal in 1976.

Barré's wife, Alexandra, won two canoeing medals at the 1984 Summer Olympics in Los Angeles with a silver in the K-2 500 m and a bronze in the K-4 500 m event. Their daughter, Mylanie, has competed in two Summer Olympics of her own, earning her best finish of seventh in the K-2 500 m event at Athens in 2004.
