= Burloak Canoe Club =

Canoe and kayak racing club in Ontario, Canada

Coordinates: 43.4453°N 79.674°W

- Type: Organizations based in Canada
- Legal status: active
- Purpose: advocate and public voice, educator and network
- Headquarters: Oakville, Ontario, Canada
- Region served: Burlington and Oakville, Ontario, Canada
- Official language: English, French
- Website: www.burloakcanoe.com

The Burloak Canoe Club is a flatwater canoe/kayak racing club located in Oakville, Ontario. It serves the communities of Burlington and Oakville and provides a variety of canoe-based activities for local residents focusing primarily on the two disciplines of sprint canoe and sprint kayak. Burloak Canoe Club is located on Navy Flats along the banks of Sixteen Mile Creek and boasts a sizable building that caters not only to sport but to special events as well.

== History ==
Burloak's history emerges from two former canoe clubs: The Mohawk Canoe Club, formerly situated in Burlington where the Spencer Smith Park now lies, and the Oakville Racing Canoe Club. Mohawk was started in 1958 by Mike Moir, Bill Pitt and Bill Dinsmore and raced under the black and green colours. The Oakville Racing Canoe Club was founded in 1974 by former Toronto Island paddler Bill Collins and Dorothy Jamieson. Oakville's colours were brown and white but when the two clubs merged in 1989, the new entity adopted a new set of official colours, though the Mohawk colours are often used unofficially to represent Burloak. The Burloak racing vest is solid black with a coloured badge on the front.

== Programs ==
The Burloak Canoe Club is involved with the local community, participating and hosting local events and providing an alternative to people looking for a unique and challenging sport. Training and competition takes place in C-1, C-2, C-4 and IC-4, C-15 (War Canoe), K-1, K-2 and K-4 canoes and kayaks.

Programs exist for all ages and skill levels, from Atom (under 10) to Masters (25 and over), and beginner to high-performance levels. Participation in local, regional and national competitions takes place for all age groups.

Burloak Canoe Club also provides a venue for numerous local dragon boat teams during the summer months.

== Olympians and World Champions ==
Many of the country's top paddlers have come out of the Burloak Canoe Club. These include Larry Cain (Olympic gold and silver medalist in C-1, 1984), Adam van Koeverden (Olympic gold and bronze medalist in K-1, 2004; Olympic silver in K-1, 2008 and 2012) and Mark Oldershaw (Olympic bronze medalist in C-1, 2012). In total, Burloak sent four paddlers to the Beijing Olympics (Brady Reardon, Mark Oldershaw, Adam van Koeverden and Chris Pellini). Oldershaw and Reardon are both from families that have sent previous generations of paddlers to the Olympics. Burloak has led the way in the development of women's canoeing (as distinct from kayaking), with notable paddlers Sheila Kuyper and Mallorie Nicholson. Nicholson won gold in the world championship C2 500 meter event in both 2010 and 2011.

== Off season ==
Winter training for all levels and ages takes place in the clubhouse between approximately November and March, revolving around weight training and aerobic exercise.

== Notable successes ==
Burloak has won the burgee at the national championship ('CCA') on ten occasions: 1981, 1982, 1983 (as Oakville Racing Canoe Club) and 1997, 1998, 2000, 2007, 2009. 2010 and 2011 Burloak Masters have achieved similar success in the over-25 age-group winning the burgee in 1989, 1994, 1995, 1997, 1998, 2002, 2010 and 2017; and being runners-up at the annual National CanMas Competition on numerous occasions, including 2008, 2009 and 2011.
