= Rudolf Blass =

German canoeist

Medal record

Men's canoe sprint

World Championships
Silver medal – second place	1971 Belgrade	K-4 1000 m
Silver medal – second place	1973 Tampere	K-4 10000 m

Rudolf Blass (born October 5, 1948 in Saarlouis) is a West German sprint canoer who competed in the early to mid-1970s. He won two silver medals at the ICF Canoe Sprint World Championships, earning them 1971 (K-4 1000 m) and 1973 (K-4 10000 m).

Blass also competed in two Summer Olympics, earning his best finish of fifth in the K-4 1000 m event at Munich in 1972.
