= Joachim Mattern =

East German canoe racer

Medal record

Men's canoe sprint

Olympic Games
Gold medal – first place	1976 Montreal	K-2 500 m
Silver medal – second place	1976 Montreal	K-2 1000 m

World Championships
Gold medal – first place	1977 Sofia	K-2 500 m
Silver medal – second place	1970 Copenhagen	K-4 1000 m
Silver medal – second place	1977 Sofia	K-2 1000 m
Bronze medal – third place	1970 Copenhagen	K-2 1000 m
Bronze medal – third place	1973 Tampere	K-2 1000 m

Joachim Mattern (born 2 May 1948 in Beeskow) is an East German sprint canoeist who competed in the 1970s. Competing in two Summer Olympics, he won two medals at Montreal in 1976 with a gold in the K-2 500 m and silver in the K-2 1000 m events.

Mattern also won five medals at the ICF Canoe Sprint World Championships with a gold (K-2 500 m: 1977), two silvers (K-2 1000 m: 1977, K-4 1000 m: 1970), and two bronzes (K-2 1000 m: 1970, 1973).
