= Jean-Pierre Burny =

Belgian canoe sprinter (born 1944)

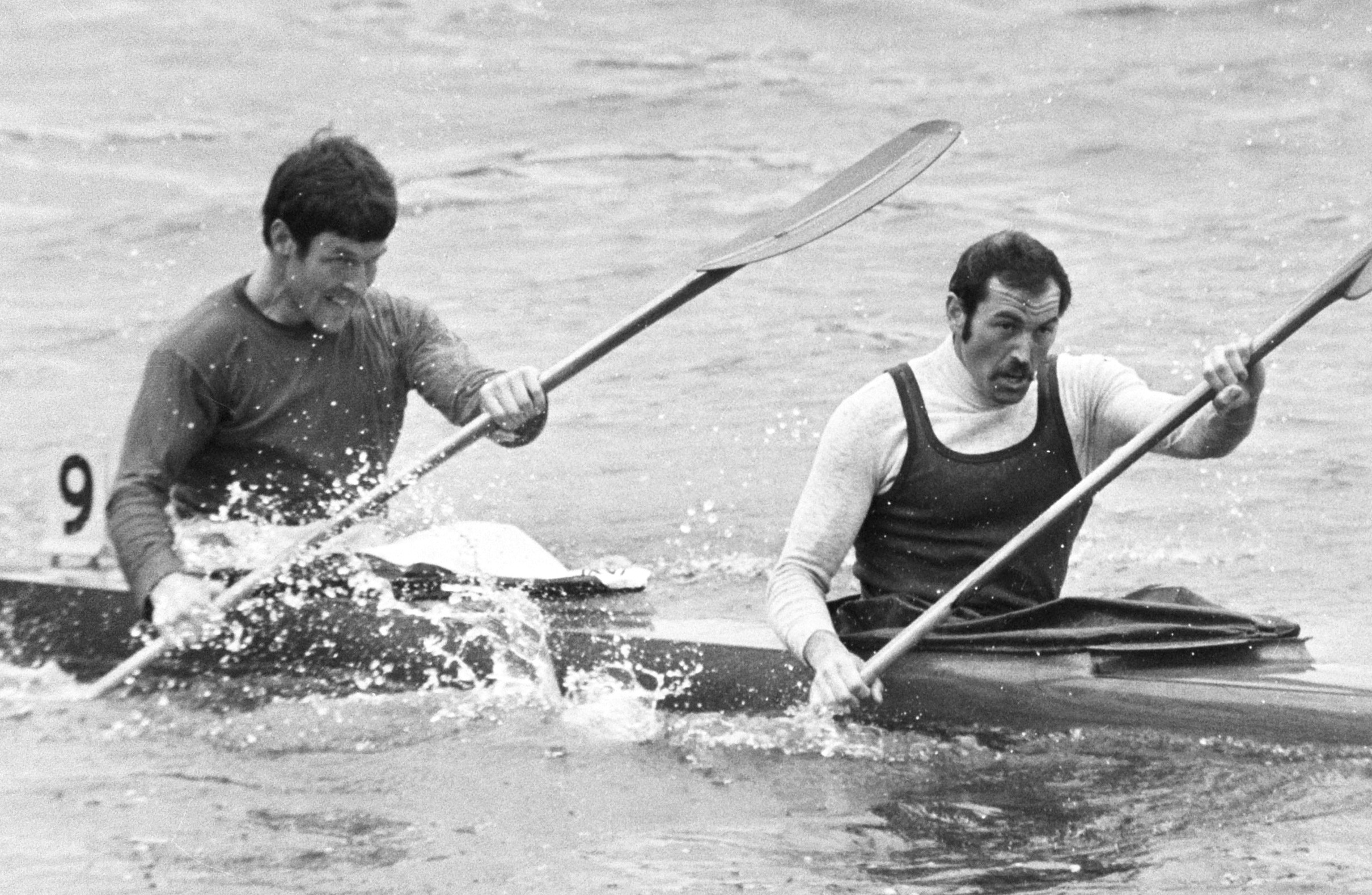
- Paul Hoekstra and Jean-Pierre Burny (right) in 1975

Personal information
- Born: 12 November 1944 (age 81) Mont-Saint-Guibert, Brabant Wallon, Belgium
- Height: 1.75 m (5 ft 9 in)
- Weight: 72 kg (159 lb)

Sport
- Sport: canoe sprint
- Club: KCC Gent, Gent; RCNML, Anseremme
Medal record
Representing Belgium
World Championships
Bronze medal – third place	1970 Copenhagen	K-1 500 m
Silver medal – second place	1971 Belgrade	K-2 500 m

Jean-Pierre Burny (Mont-Saint-Guibert, 12 November 1944) is a Belgian canoe sprinter who competed from the late 1960s to the mid-1970s. He won two medals at the ICF Canoe Sprint World Championships with a silver (K-2 500 m: 1971) and a bronze (K-1 500 m: 1970).

Burny also competed in three Summer Olympics in 1968–1976 with the best result of fourth place in the K-1 1000 m event in 1972.
