= Policarp Malîhin =

Romanian sprint canoeist

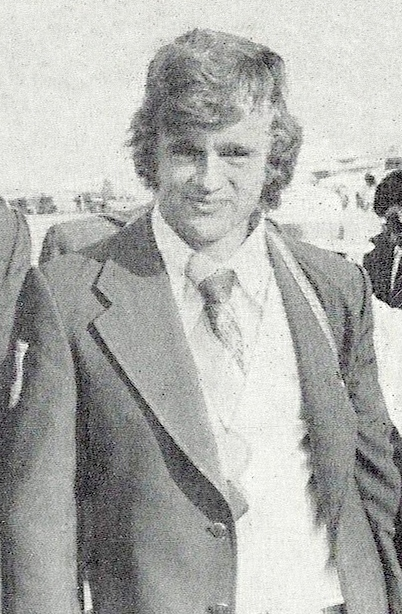
- Malîhin in 1976

Personal information
- Born: 9 March 1954 (age 72) Segarcea, Romania
- Height: 178 cm (5 ft 10 in)
- Weight: 74 kg (163 lb)

Sport
- Sport: Canoe sprint
Medal record
Representing Romania
Olympic Games
Bronze medal – third place	1976 Montreal	K-2 500 m
World Championships
Silver medal – second place	1975 Belgrade	K-2 1000 m
Bronze medal – third place	1975 Belgrade	K-2 500 m
Silver medal – second place	1977 Sofia	K-4 500 m

Policarp Malîhin (born 9 March 1954) is a retired Romanian sprint canoeist who mostly competed in doubles together with Larion Serghei. They won a bronze medal at the 1976 Olympics and two medals at the 1975 World Championships.
