= Anders Andersson (canoeist) =

Swedish sprint canoer

Anders Andersson (born 18 December 1952) is a Swedish sprint canoer who competed in the late 1970s and early 1980s. Competing in two Summer Olympics, he earned his best finish of sixth in the K-1 500 m event at Moscow in 1980.
