= Larion Serghei =

Romanian sprint canoeist (1952–2019)

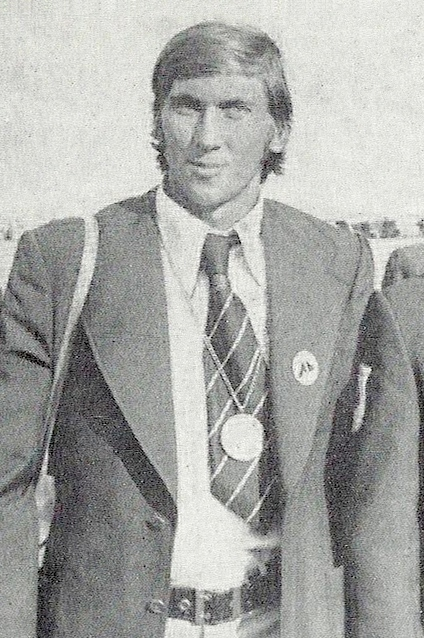
- Larion Serghei in 1976

Personal information
- Born: 11 March 1952 Sadova, Moldavian SSR, Soviet Union
- Died: 5 November 2019 (aged 67) Câineni, Romania
- Height: 184 cm (6 ft 0 in)
- Weight: 74 kg (163 lb)

Sport
- Sport: Canoe sprint
Medal record
Representing Romania
Olympic Games
Bronze medal – third place	1976 Montreal	K-2 500 m
World Championships
Silver medal – second place	1975 Belgrade	K-2 1000 m
Bronze medal – third place	1975 Belgrade	K-2 500 m

Larion Serghei (11 March 1952 – 5 November 2019) was a Romanian sprint canoeist, who competed in doubles together with Policarp Malîhin. They won a bronze medal at the 1976 Olympics and two medals at the 1975 World Championships.
