= Erich Pasch =

Olympic canoeist (born 1946)

Medal record

Men's canoe sprint

Representing West Germany

World Championships
Silver medal – second place	1971 Belgrade	K-4 1000 m
Silver medal – second place	1973 Tampere	K-4 10000 m
Silver medal – second place	1975 Belgrade	K-1 10000 m

Erich Pasch (sometimes listed as Hans-Erich Pasch, born 8 November 1946) is a West German sprint canoeist who competed in the 1970s. He won silver medals at the ICF Canoe Sprint World Championships (K-1 10000 m: 1975, K-4 1000 m: 1971, K-4 10000 m: 1973).

Pasch competed in two Summer Olympics, earning his best finish of fifth in the K-4 1000 m event at Munich in 1972.
