= János Rátkai =

Hungarian canoeist (born 1951)

Medal record

Men's canoe sprint

Olympic Games
| Silver medal – second place | 1972 Munich | K-2 1000 m |

World Championships
| Gold medal – first place | 1973 Tampere | K-2 1000 m |
| Gold medal – first place | 1973 Tampere | K-4 1000 m |
| Silver medal – second place | 1973 Tampere | K-2 500 m |
| Silver medal – second place | 1974 Mexico City | K-2 500 m |
| Silver medal – second place | 1977 Sofia | K-4 10000 m |
| Bronze medal – third place | 1974 Mexico City | K-4 1000 m |
| Bronze medal – third place | 1975 Belgrade | K-2 1000 m |
| Bronze medal – third place | 1975 Belgrade | K-4 1000 m |

János Rátkai (born 30 May 1951) is a Hungarian sprint canoeist who competed from the early 1970s to the early 1980s. Competing in three Summer Olympics, he won a silver medal in the K-2 1000 m event at Munich in 1972.

Rátkai also won eight medals at the ICF Canoe Sprint World Championships with two golds (K-2 1000 m and K-4 1000 m: both 1973), three silvers (K-2 500 m: 1973, 1974; K-4 10000 m: 1977), and three bronzes (K-2 1000 m: 1975, K-4 1000 m: 1974, 1975).
