= Guillermo del Riego =

Spanish canoeist

Olympic medal record

Men's canoe sprint
Silver medal – second place	1980 Moscow	K-2 500 m

Guillermo del Riego Gordón (born 11 September 1958) is a Spanish sprint canoeist who competed from the mid-1970s to the mid-1980s. Competing in three Summer Olympics, he won a silver medal in the K-2 500 m event at Moscow in 1980.
