= Mark Oldershaw =

Canadian canoeist (born 1983)

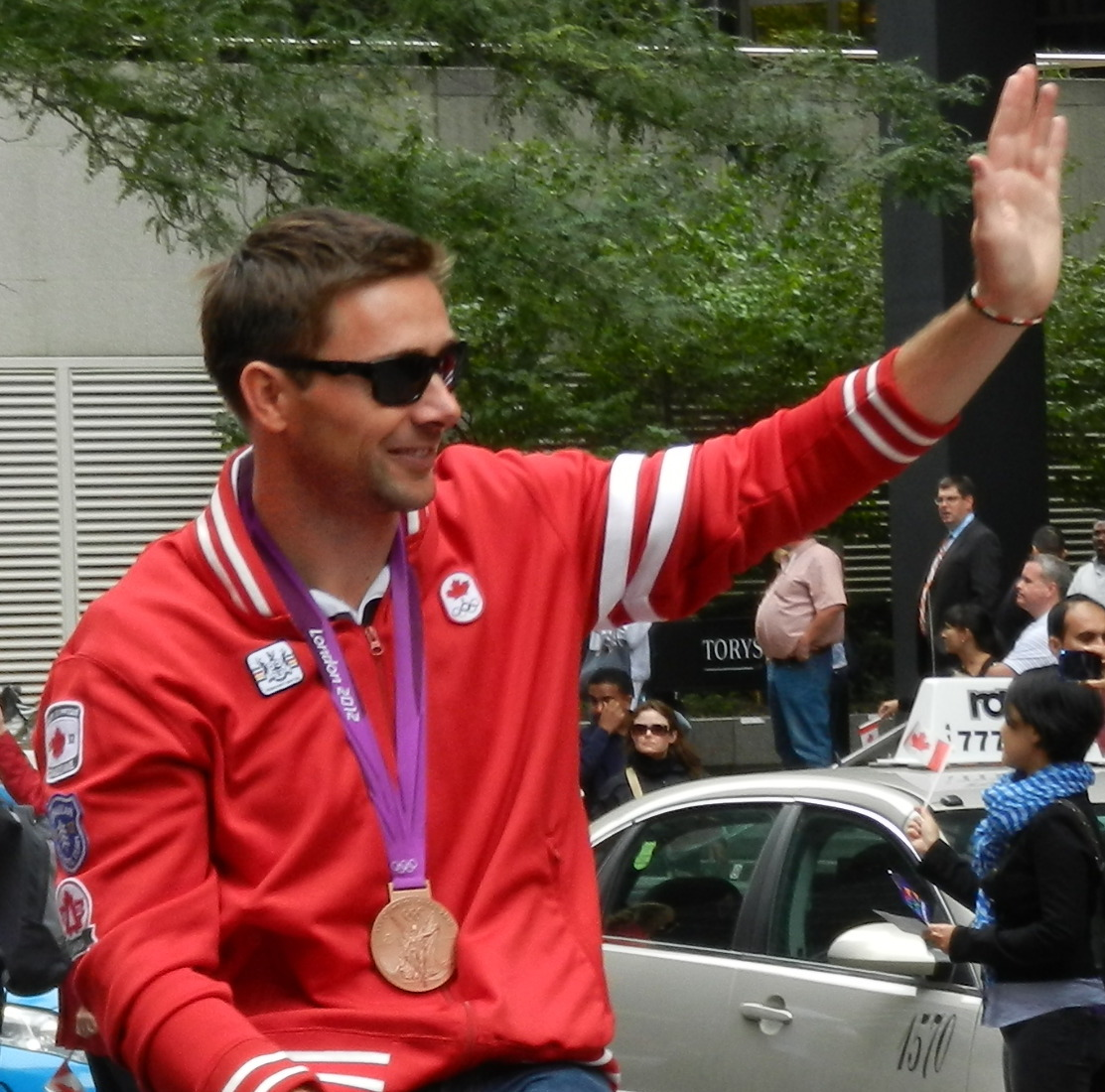
- Oldershaw at the 2012 Olympic Heroes Parade in Toronto, September 2012

Personal information
- Nationality: Canadian
- Born: February 7, 1983 (age 43) Burlington, Ontario, Canada
- Height: 1.86 m (6 ft 1 in)
- Weight: 94 kg (207 lb)

Sport
- Sport: Canoeing
- Events: C-1 1000m, C-1 500m
Medal record
Olympic Games
Bronze medal – third place	2012 London	C-1 1000 m
World Championships
Bronze medal – third place	2013 Duisburg	C-1 5000 m
Bronze medal – third place	2013 Duisburg	4 x C–1 200 m
Pan American Games
Silver medal – second place	2015 Toronto	C-1 1000 m

Mark Oldershaw (born February 7, 1983) is a Canadian sprint canoeist. Oldershaw won the bronze medal in the C-1 1000 m at the 2012 Summer Olympics in London. He is a third generation Canadian Olympic canoer, fifth family member to compete at the Olympics and the first member of the family to win an Olympic medal. He was a double Junior World Champion in the C-1 500 m and C-1 1,000 m in 2001.

== Career ==
Oldershaw was born in Burlington, Ontario. He first rose to prominence as a double gold-medalist at the Junior World Championships in 2001, winning both the C-1 500 m and C-1 1,000 m events. However a few years later a tumour was discovered in his right hand which was his prominent paddling hand. This required two surgeries, damaged a nerve and caused him chronic pain. This also caused him to miss qualifying for the 2004 Summer Olympics in Athens. Oldershaw did qualify for the 2008 Summer Olympics, there at Beijing he suffered further disappointment, missing the final of the C-1 500 m event.

Despite these disappointments he continued on in his career and his goal of Olympic success. At the 2011 World Championships in Szeged, Hungary Oldershaw came 5th in the C-1 1,000 m. He then qualified as part of Canada's team for the 2012 Summer Olympics, he won a bronze medal in the C-1 1,000 m event. After achieving Olympic success at last, he stated that "I am so happy. I just can’t even put it into words right now. I’m just so proud to represent Canada. The whole race I was just staring at the nose of my boat, there’s a big maple leaf on it, and it’s just such a good feeling."

On July 1, 2015 Oldershaw was named the flagbearer of Canada at the 2015 Pan American Games opening ceremony.

== Personal ==
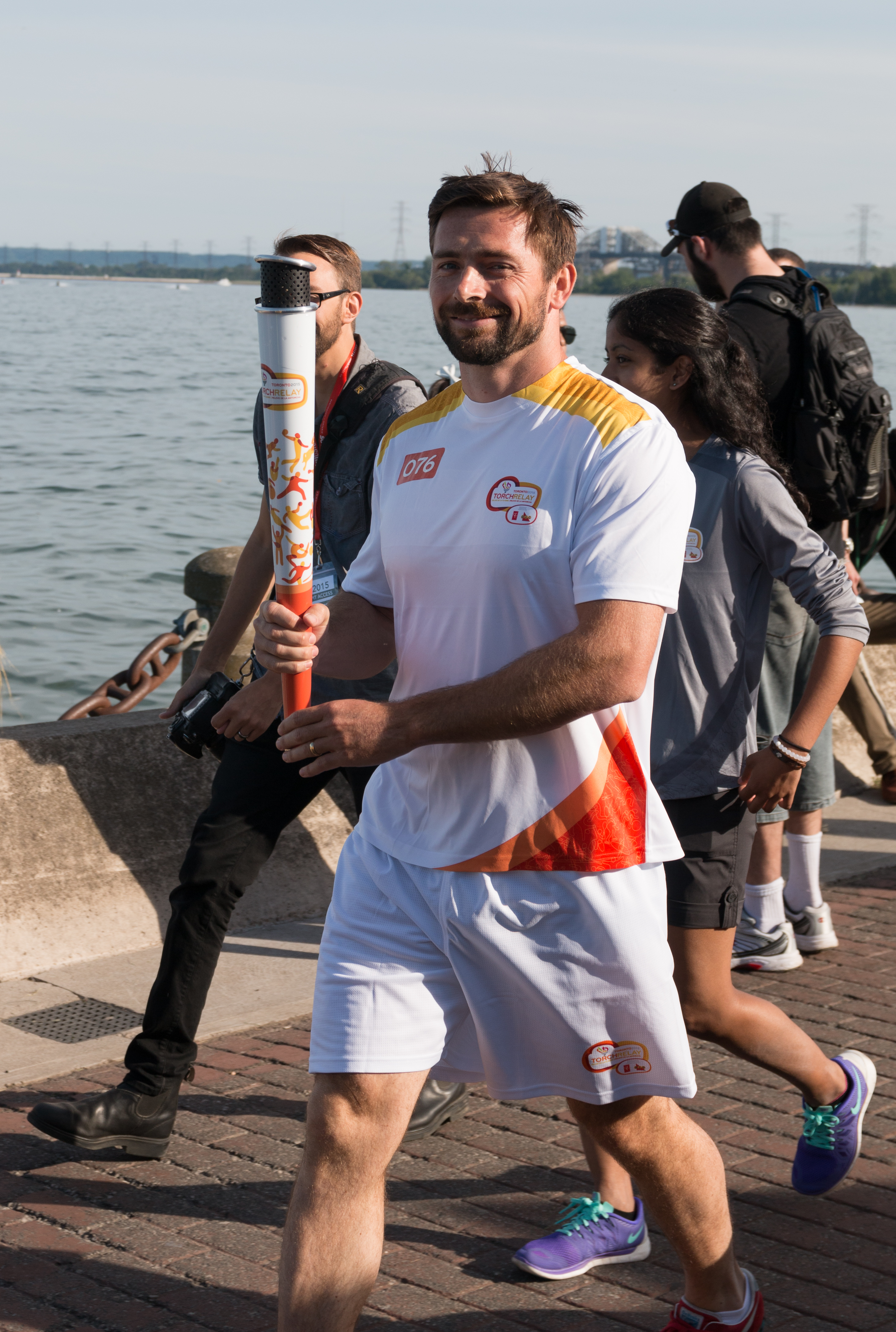
Mark Oldershaw at the 2015 Burlington's Sound of Music Festival, participating as part of the 2015 Pan American Games torch relay.

He is a son of Olympian canoeist Scott Oldershaw—who is also his coach at the Burloak Canoe Club—and grandson of Olympian canoeist Bert Oldershaw, making him the third generation and fifth member of his family to compete in the Olympics. Oldershaw is also close friends with Olympic teammate Adam van Koeverden and trains together with him at the Burloak Canoe Club.
