= Paul Hoekstra =

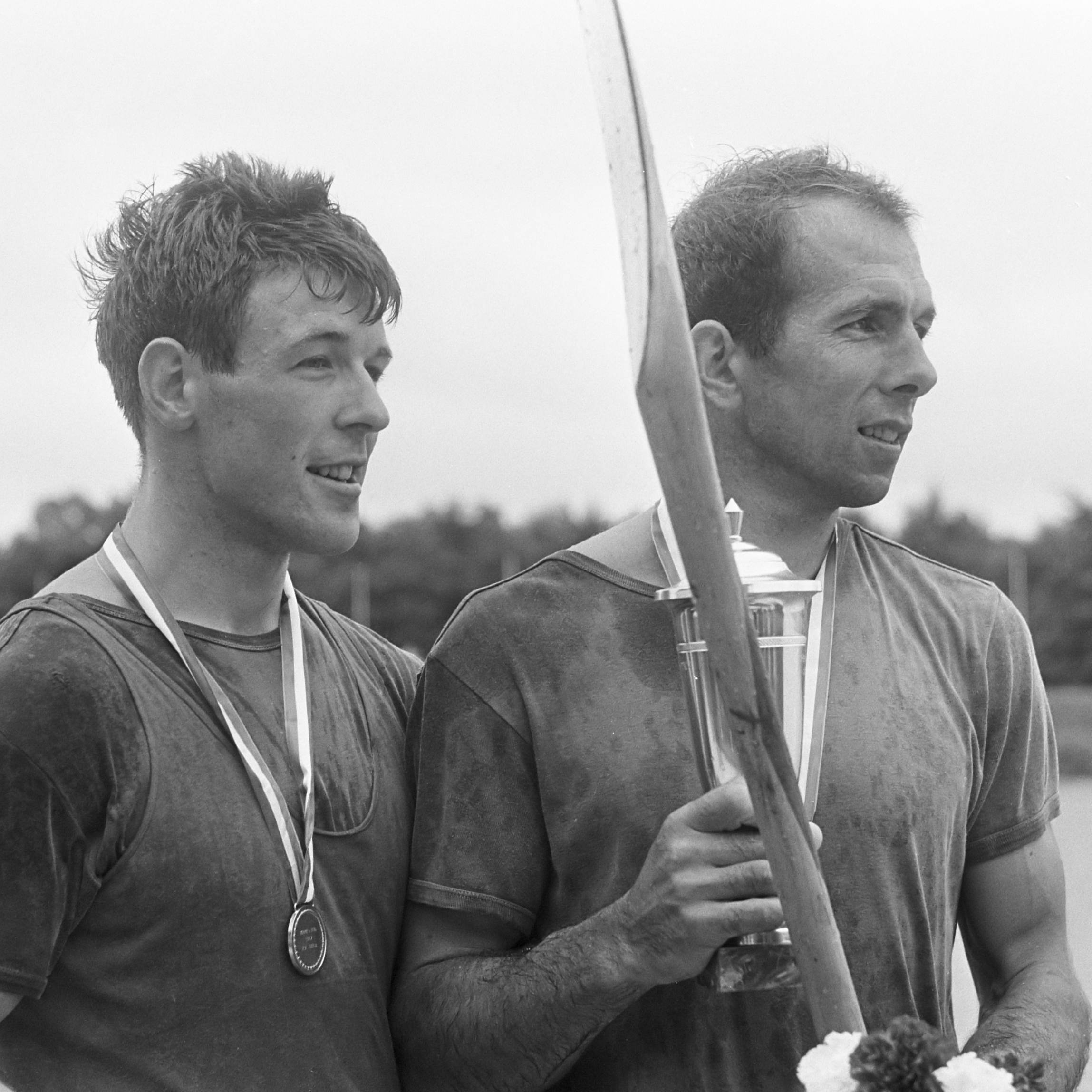
- Hoekstra (left) and Anton Geurts in 1967

Personal information
- Full name: Paulus Joan Hoekstra
- Born: 30 December 1944 (age 81) Enschede, the Netherlands
- Height: 1.79 m (5 ft 10 in)
- Weight: 83 kg (183 lb)

Sport
- Sport: canoe sprint
- Club: TWV, Hengelo (NED); KCC Gent, Gent
Medal record
Olympic Games
Representing the Netherlands
Silver medal – second place	1964 Tokyo	K-2 1000 m
World Championships
Bronze medal – third place	1966 East Berlin	K-1 500 m
Representing Belgium
World Championships
Silver medal – second place	1971 Belgrade	K-2 500 m

Paulus "Paul" Hoekstra (Enschede, 30 December 1944) is a Dutch-born, Belgian retired sprint canoeist who was active from the mid-1960s to the mid-1970s. Competing in three Summer Olympics, he won a silver medal in the K-2 1000 m event at Tokyo in 1964. Hoekstra also won two medals at the ICF Canoe Sprint World Championships with a silver (K-2 500 m: 1971 for Belgium) and a bronze (K-1 500 m: 1966 for the Netherlands).
