= John Southwood (canoeist) =

Australian canoeist

John Allen Southwood (born 18 January 1943) is an Australian sprint canoeist who competed from the late 1960s to the mid-1970s. Competing in three Summer Olympics, He earned his best finish of eighth in the K-2 500 m event at Montreal in 1976.
