= Günther Pfaff =

Austrian canoeist (1939–2020)

Medal record

Men's canoe sprint

Olympic Games
| Bronze medal – third place | 1968 Mexico City | K-2 1000 m |

World Championships
| Gold medal – first place | 1970 Copenhagen | K-2 1000 m |
| Silver medal – second place | 1966 East Berlin | K-4 1000 m |
| Silver medal – second place | 1971 Belgrade | K-2 1000 m |
| Bronze medal – third place | 1970 Copenhagen | K-2 500 m |

Günther Pfaff (Steyr, 12 August 1939 – Garsten, 10 November 2020) was an Austrian sprint canoeist who competed from the mid-1960s to the mid-1970s. Competing in four Summer Olympics, he won a bronze in the K-2 1000 m event at Mexico City in 1968.

Pfaff also won four medals at the ICF Canoe Sprint World Championships with a gold (K-2 1000 m: 1970), two silvers (K-2 1000 m: 1971, K-4 1000 m: 1966), and a bronze (K-2 500 m: 1970).
