= Canoeing at the 1948 Summer Olympics =

Coordinates: 51.5551°N 0.8903°W

Canoeing at the Games of the XIV Olympiad
- No. of events: 9

At the 1948 Summer Olympics in London, nine events in sprint canoe racing were contested. For the first time, a women's event was part of the Olympic program.

== Medal table ==
Rank	Nation	Gold	Silver	Bronze	Total
1	Sweden	4	0	0	4
2	Czechoslovakia	3	1	0	4
3	Denmark	1	2	0	3
3	United States	1	2	0	3
5	Finland	0	1	2	3
6	Canada	0	1	1	2
6	Norway	0	1	1	2
8	Netherlands	0	1	0	1
9	France	0	0	4	4
10	Austria	0	0	1	1
Totals (10 entries)		9	9	9	27

== Medal summary ==
=== Men's events ===
Games	Gold	Silver	Bronze
C-1 1000 metres	Josef Holeček (TCH)	Douglas Bennett (CAN)	Robert Boutigny (FRA)
C-1 10000 metres	František Čapek (TCH)	Frank Havens (USA)	Norman Lane (CAN)
C-2 1000 metres	Jan Brzák-Felix and Bohumil Kudrna (TCH)	Steven Lysak and Stephen Macknowski (USA)	Georges Dransart and Georges Gandil (FRA)
C-2 10000 metres	Steven Lysak and Stephen Macknowski (USA)	Václav Havel and Jiří Pecka (TCH)	Georges Dransart and Georges Gandil (FRA)
K-1 1000 metres	Gert Fredriksson (SWE)	Johan Andersen (DEN)	Henri Eberhardt (FRA)
K-1 10000 metres	Gert Fredriksson (SWE)	Kurt Wires (FIN)	Eivind Skabo (NOR)
K-2 1000 metres	Hans Berglund and Lennart Klingström (SWE)	Ejvind Hansen and Bernhard Jensen (DEN)	Thor Axelsson and Nils Björklöf (FIN)
K-2 10000 metres	Gunnar Åkerlund and Hans Wetterström (SWE)	Ivar Mathisen and Knut Østby (NOR)	Thor Axelsson and Nils Björklöf (FIN)

=== Women's event ===
Games	Gold	Silver	Bronze
K-1 500 metres	Karen Hoff (DEN)	Alida van der Anker-Doedens (NED)	Fritzi Schwingl (AUT)

== Participating nations ==
- Austria (7)
- Belgium (9)
- Canada (7)
- Czechoslovakia (13)
- Denmark (7)
- Finland (5)
- France (10)
- Great Britain (8)
- Hungary (5)
- Luxembourg (3)
- Netherlands (7)
- Norway (4)
- Poland (3)
- Sweden (9)
- Switzerland (6)
- United States (9)
