= Canoeing at the 1948 Summer Olympics – Men's K-2 1000 metres =

These are the results of the men's K-2 1000 metres competition in canoeing at the 1948 Summer Olympics. The K-2 event is raced by two-man canoe sprint kayaks. Heats and final took place on August 12.

== Medalists ==
Gold	Silver	Bronze
Hans Berglund and Lennart Klingström (SWE)	Ejvind Hansen and Jakob Jensen (DEN)	Thor Axelsson and Nils Björklöf (FIN)

== Heats ==
The 16 teams first raced in two heats. The top four teams in each heat advanced directly to the final.

Heat 1
1.	Thor Axelsson and Nils Björklöf (FIN)	4:16.7	QF
2.	Kálmán Blahó and János Urányi (HUN)	4:18.4	QF
3.	Ota Kroutil and Miloš Pech (TCH)	4:20.4	QF
4.	Gerald Covey and Henry Harper (CAN)	4:34.2	QF
5.	René Fonck and Jean Nickels (LUX)	4:41.7
6.	Bruno Masciadri and Franz Reiner (SUI)	4:43.9
7.	Jack Henderson and John Simmons (GBR)	4:45.0
Heat 2
1.	Ejvind Hansen and Bernhard Jensen (DEN)	-	QF
2.	Ivar Mathisen and Knut Østby (NOR)	-	QF
3.	Cees Gravesteyn and Wim Pool (NED)	-	QF
4.	Hans Berglund and Lennart Klingström (SWE)	-	QF
5.	Paul Felinger and Herbert Klepp (AUT)	-
6.	Frans Van den Berghen and Albert Van de Vilet (BEL)	-
7.	François Donna and Raymond Richez (FRA)	-
8.	Alfons Jezewski and Marian Matloka (POL)	-
9.	Raymond Clark and John Eiseman (USA)	-

No times were recorded in the second heat according to the official Olympic report.

== Final ==
Gold	Hans Berglund and Lennart Klingström (SWE)	4:07.3
Silver	Ejvind Hansen and Bernhard Jensen (DEN)	4:07.5
Bronze	Thor Axelsson and Nils Björklöf (FIN)	4:08.7
4.	Ivar Mathisen and Knut Østby (NOR)	4:09.1
5.	Ota Kroutil and Miloš Pech (TCH)	4:09.8
6.	Cees Gravesteyn and Wim Pool (NED)	4:15.8
7.	Gerald Covey and Henry Harper (CAN)	4:56.8
-	Kálmán Blahó and János Urányi (HUN)	DQ

Blahó and Urányi were disqualified for "hanging" in the wake of another kayak.
