= Canoeing at the 1948 Summer Olympics – Women's K-1 500 metres =

These are the results of the women's K-1 500 metres competition in canoeing at the 1948 Summer Olympics. The K-1 event is raced by single-person canoe sprint kayaks. Heat and semifinals took place on August 12.

== Medalists ==
| Gold | Silver | Bronze |
| Karen Hoff (DEN) | Alida van der Anker-Doedens (NED) | Fritzi Schwingl (AUT) |

== Heats ==
The ten competitors first raced in two heats. The top four finishers in both heats moved directly to the final.

Heat 1
| 1. | Růžena Košťálová (TCH) | 2:39.6 | QF |
| 2. | Sylvi Saimo (FIN) | 2:41.7 | QF |
| 3. | Anna Van Marcke (BEL) | 2:44.7 | QF |
| 4. | Claire Vautrin (FRA) | 2:45.2 | QF |
| 5. | Joyce Richards (GBR) | 3:00.1 |
Heat 2
| 1. | Karen Hoff (DEN) | 2:32.2 | QF |
| 2. | Alida van der Anker-Doedens (NED) | 2:35.4 | QF |
| 3. | Fritzi Schwingl (AUT) | 2:35.7 | QF |
| 4. | Klára Fried-Bánfalvi (HUN) | 2:37.5 | QF |
| 5. | Ingrid Wallgren (SWE) | 2:38.5 |

== Final ==
| Gold | Karen Hoff (DEN) | 2:31.9 |
| Silver | Alida van der Anker-Doedens (NED) | 2:32.8 |
| Bronze | Fritzi Schwingl (AUT) | 2:32.9 |
| 4. | Klára Fried-Bánfalvi (HUN) | 2:33.8 |
| 5. | Růžena Košťálová (TCH) | 2:38.2 |
| 6. | Sylvi Saimo (FIN) | 2:38.4 |
| 7. | Anna Van Marcke (BEL) | 2:43.4 |
| 8. | Claire Vautrin (FRA) | 2:44.4 |
