= Ivar Mathisen =

Norwegian canoeist (1920–2008)

Medal record

Men's canoe sprint

Olympic Games
Silver medal – second place	1948 London	K-2 10000 m

World Championships
Silver medal – second place	1948 London	K-1 4 x 500 m
Silver medal – second place	1950 Copenhagen	K-2 1000 m

Ivar Mathisen (14 June 1920 – 7 October 2008) was a Norwegian sprint canoeist who competed in the 1940s and early 1950s. He received a silver medal in the K-2 10000 m event at the 1948 Summer Olympics in London with Knut Østby. Mathisen finished fourth in the K-2 1000 m event at those same games.

== Early life ==
He was a member of the canoeing club Bærum KK from an early age. During the German occupation of Norway, which started before Mathisen's twentieth birthday, the club was dissolved, but several members continued training. In the autumn of 1940 Mathisen and nine others also became involved in the resistance organization Milorg, in group 13321. They held meetings on islands in the Oslofjord during the summer, and held paramilitary exercises in the Vestmarka forested area. Often, they would pick up crates dropped by British pilots. His place of work, the paper factory at Hamang, was also the site of exercises. Laborers practised shooting with Sten submachine guns and Bren light machine guns in the cellar. Once, Mathisen told in an interview, they had stacked targets in front of an exit door, and their rounds went through the targets and the door, possibly revealing the shooting for onlookers. However, Mathisen was never discovered; according to his own statement he was never even controlled by soldiers or Gestapo.

== Sporting career ==
Mathisen profited from his World War II physical activity. He took his first Norwegian national title in 1946, and eight more titles would follow, the last in 1953. Five of the titles came in relay races. He competed in the 1948 ICF Canoe Sprint World Championships, and received a silver medal in K-1 4 x 500 metres relay, together with teammates Ivar Iversen, Hans Martin Gulbrandsen and Eivind Skabo. Before the 1948 Summer Olympics, Mathisen and his teammate Knut Østby (also from Bærum) were considered as having the highest medal hopes in the Norwegian canoeing squad. Mathisen and Østby proceeded to win the silver medal in the K-2 10000 m event and finished fourth in the K-2 1000 m. Mathisen then received a silver medal in K-2 1000 m at the 1950 ICF Canoe Sprint World Championships, with Knut Østby. At the 1952 Summer Olympics in Helsinki, he finished fifth in both the K-2 1000 m and K-2 10000 m events.

Mathisen resided in Vøyenenga until his death in October 2008.
