= Canoeing at the 1948 Summer Olympics – Men's K-1 1000 metres =

These are the results of the men's K-1 1000 metres competition in canoeing at the 1948 Summer Olympics. The K-1 event is raced by single-man canoe sprint kayaks. Heat and semifinals took place on August 12.

== Medalists ==
Gold	Silver	Bronze
Gert Fredriksson (SWE)	Johan Andersen (DEN)	Henri Eberhardt (FRA)

== Heats ==
The 15 competitors first raced in two heats. The top four finishers in both heats moved directly to the final.

Heat 1
1.	Gert Fredriksson (SWE)	4:51.9	QF
2.	Harry Åkerfelt (FIN)	4:52.0	QF
3.	Walter Piemann (AUT)	4:52.2	QF
4.	Lubomir Vambera (TCH)	4:52.8	QF
5.	Julien Bogaert (BEL)	5:00.1
6.	Hans Straub (SUI)	5:05.5
7.	Marcel Lentz (LUX)	5:10.8
Heat 2
1.	Johan Frederik Kobberup (DEN)	4:40.9	QF
2.	Hans Martin Gulbrandsen (NOR)	4:45.4	QF
3.	Henri Eberhardt (FRA)	4:45.5	QF
4.	Wim van der Kroft (NED)	4:46.2	QF
5.	Czesław Soberiaj (POL)	4:46.5
6.	Thomas Horton (USA)	4:58.0
7.	János Toldi (HUN)	4:59.8
8.	Norman Dobson (GBR)	5:00.1

== Final ==
Gold	Gert Fredriksson (SWE)	4:33.2
Silver	Johan Frederik Kobberup (DEN)	4:39.9
Bronze	Henri Eberhardt (FRA)	4:41.4
4.	Hans Martin Gulbrandsen (NOR)	4:41.7
5.	Wim van der Kroft (NED)	4:43.5
6.	Harry Åkerfelt (FIN)	4:44.2
7.	Lubomir Vambera (TCH)	4:44.3
8.	Walter Piemann (AUT)	4:50.3

In the heats, Fredriksson was fourth with 50 meters left and sprinted to the win. Fredriksson's margin of victory is the largest in any Olympic kayak final that was not 10,000 meters in length.
