= Ortner =

Ortner can refer to:

== People ==
- Eric Ortner, an American news producer
- Erwin Ortner (born 1947), Austrian choral conductor
- Hans Ortner, an Austrian canoe racer
- Jon Ortner, an American photographer
- Richard Ortner, president of the Boston Conservatory
- Sherry Ortner, a cultural anthropologist

== Other ==
- 11681 Ortnera main-belt minor planet named for Austrian geophysicist Johannes Ortner
- Ortner's syndrome, a rare cardiovocal disorder
- Ortner, Lancashire, a village in Lancashire, England
