= Canoeing at the 1948 Summer Olympics – Men's K-1 10000 metres =

These are the results of the men's K-1 10000 metres competition in canoeing at the 1948 Summer Olympics. The K-1 event is raced by single-man canoe sprint kayaks.

== Medalists ==
Gold	Silver	Bronze
Gert Fredriksson (SWE)	Kurt Wires (FIN)	Eivind Skabo (NOR)

== Final ==
The final took place on August 11.

Gold	Gert Fredriksson (SWE)	50:47.7
Silver	Kurt Wires (FIN)	51:18.2
Bronze	Elvind Skabo (NOR)	51:35.4
4.	Knud Ditlevsen (DEN)	51:54.2
5.	Henri Eberhardt (FRA)	52:09.0
6.	Jochem Bobeldijk (NED)	52:13.2
7.	Czesław Sobieraj (POL)	52:51.0
8.	Alfred Corbiaux (BEL)	53:23.5
9.	Jan Matocha (TCH)	53:51.0
10.	Herbert Klepp (AUT)	55:11.7
11.	Emil Bottlang (SUI)	55:33.7
12.	Ernest Riedel (USA)	56:34.5
13.	Marcel Lentz (LUX)	59:58.2
