= Harrie Koorstra =

Dutch canoeist (1930–2004)

Medal record

Men's canoe sprint

World Championships
Bronze medal – third place	1950 Copenhagen	K-2 1000 m

Harry, Harri or Harrie Koorstra (15 February 1930 – 6 March 2004) was a Dutch sprint canoeist who competed in the late 1940s and early 1950s. He canoed for the Amsterdam club "Viking" and usually paired with Piet Bakker of the same club. They won a bronze medal in the K-2 1000 m event at the 1950 ICF Canoe Sprint World Championships in Copenhagen.

Koorstra died on 6 March 2004, at the age of 74.
