= Lars Helsvik =

Swedish canoeist

Medal record

Men's canoe sprint

World Championships
Gold medal – first place	1948 London	K-1 4 x 500 m

Lars Helsvik is a Swedish sprint canoeist who competed in the late 1940s.

== Career ==
In 1948, Helsvik won a gold medal in the K-1 4 x 500 m event at the London ICF Canoe Spring World Championships. This event was separate from other canoeing competitions at the 1948 Summer Olympics in London. The K-1 4 x 500 m event was only held once at the 1960 Games in Rome.
