= Van Marcke =

Van Marcke or Vanmarcke is a surname. Notable people with the surname include:

- Anna Van Marcke (1924–2012), Belgian sprint canoer
- Émile van Marcke (1827–1890), French painter
- Ronny Vanmarcke (born 1947), Belgian cyclist
- Rosa Gilissen-Vanmarcke (born 1944), Flemish sculptor
- Sep Vanmarcke (born 1988), Belgian cyclist
