= Henry Peterson =

Henry Peterson may refer to:

- Henry Peterson (author) (1818–1891), American writer and editor
- Henry K. Peterson (1884–1966), justice of the Iowa Supreme Court
- Ole Pete (Henry Peterson, c. 1854–1934), American folk legend

== See also ==
- Harry H. Peterson (1890–1985), American lawyer, judge and politician
- Henry Petersen (1900–1949), Danish athlete
- Henry E. Petersen (1921–1991), American attorney and government official
- Henry Pettersson (1919–2016), Swedish sprint canoer
