= 1948 ICF Canoe Sprint World Championships =

International canoe competition

The 1948 ICF Canoe Sprint World Championships were held in London, Great Britain. This event was held under the auspices of the International Canoe Federation, formed in 1946 from the Internationale Repräsentantenschaft Kanusport (IRK).

The men's competition consisted of four kayak events. One kayak event was held for the women. The women's distance was reduced from 600 m to 500 m at these championships. These events were extraordinary since they were not included in the 1948 Summer Olympics, also held in London.

These were the second championships in flatwater racing and the first ones after World War II ended.

== Medal summary ==
=== Men's kayak ===
| Event | Gold | Time | Silver | Time | Bronze | Time |
|---|---|---|---|---|---|---|
| K-1 500 m | Gert Fredriksson (SWE) | 2:14.2 | Lars Glassér (SWE) | 2:15.0 | Poul Agger (DEN) | 2:15.4 |
| K-1 4 x 500 m relay | Sweden; Lars Glassér; Lars Helsvik; Lennart Klingström; Gert Fredriksson | 8:44.5 | Norway; Ivar Mathisen; Ivar Iversen; Hans Martin Gulbrandsen; Eivind Skabo | 8:52.2 | Denmark; Bernhard Jensen; Poul Agger; Ejvind Hansen; Johan Andersen | 8:56.9 |
| K-2 500 m | Finland; Thor Axelsson; Nils Björklöf | 2:06.4 | Denmark; Alfred Christensen; Finn Rasmussen | 2:07.0 | Denmark; Bernhard Jensen; Ejvind Hansen | 2:08.1 |
| K-4 1000 m | Sweden; Hans Berglund; Lennart Klingström; Gunnar Åkerlund; Hans Wetterström | 4:01.9 | Austria; Herbert Klepp; Paul Felinger; Walter Piemann; Albert Umgeher | 4:06.8 | Czechoslovakia; Ludvík Klíma; Karel Lomecký; Ota Krouthil; Miloš Pech | 4:08.1 |

=== Women's kayak ===
| Event | Gold | Time | Silver | Time | Bronze | Time |
|---|---|---|---|---|---|---|
| K-2 500 m | Denmark; Karen Hoff; Bodil Svendsen | 2:22.9 | Czechoslovakia; Marta Kohoutová; Růžena Košťálová | 2:23.0 | Austria; Fritzi Schwingl; Gertrude Liebhardt | 2:24.0 |

== Medals table ==
| Rank | Nation | Gold | Silver | Bronze | Total |
|---|---|---|---|---|---|
| 1 | Sweden (SWE) | 3 | 1 | 0 | 4 |
| 2 | Denmark (DEN) | 1 | 1 | 3 | 5 |
| 3 | Finland (FIN) | 1 | 0 | 0 | 1 |
| 4 | Austria (AUT) | 0 | 1 | 1 | 2 |
| 4 | Czechoslovakia (TCH) | 0 | 1 | 1 | 2 |
| 6 | Norway (NOR) | 0 | 1 | 0 | 1 |
| Totals (6 entries) | | 5 | 5 | 5 | 15 |
