= Vautin =

Vautin is a surname. Notable people with the surname include:

- Charles Vautin (1867–1942), Australian cricketer
- George Vautin (1869–1949), Australian rules footballer
- Claude Vautin (1855–1939), Australian extractive metallurgist and chemist
- Paul Vautin (born 1959), Australian rugby league player, coach, and television presenter

== See also ==
- Vautrin (disambiguation)
