= Canoeing at the 1948 Summer Olympics – Men's K-2 10000 metres =

Summer Olympics

These are the results of the men's K-2 10000 metres competition in canoeing at the 1948 Summer Olympics. The K-2 event is raced by two-man canoe sprint kayaks.

== Medalists ==
| Gold | Silver | Bronze |
| Gunnar Åkerlund and Hans Wetterström (SWE) | Ivar Mathisen and Knut Østby (NOR) | Thor Axelsson and Nils Björklöf (FIN) |

== Final ==
The final took place August 11.

| Gold | Gunnar Åkerlund and Hans Wetterström (SWE) | 46:09.4 |
| Silver | Ivar Mathisen and Knut Østby (NOR) | 46:44.8 |
| Bronze | Thor Axelsson and Nils Björklof (FIN) | 46:48.2 |
| 4. | Alfred Christensen and Finn Rasmussen (DEN) | 47:17.5 |
| 5. | Gyula Andrási and János Urányi (HUN) | 47:33.1 |
| 6. | Cornelius Koch and Henrdrik Stroo (NED) | 47:35.6 |
| 7. | Ludvík Klíma and Karel Lomecký (TCH) | 48:14.9 |
| 8. | Hilaire Deprez and Jozef Massy (BEL) | 48:23.1 |
| 9. | Walter Piemann and Alfred Umgeher (AUT) | 48:24.5 |
| 10. | Alfons Jezewski and Marian Matłotka (POL) | 48:25.6 |
| 11. | Fritz Frey and Werner Zimmermann (SUI) | 48:33.2 |
| 12. | René Flèche and Maurice Graffen (FRA) | 50:10.1 |
| 13. | Raymond Clark and John Eiseman (USA) | 50:26.6 |
| 14. | Gerald Covey and Henry Harper (CAN) | 53:04.2 |
| 15. | René Fonck and Jean Nickels (LUX) | 53:46.0 |
