= Skabo =

Skabo may refer to:

- Škabo (born 1976), Serbian hip hop musician
- Skabo Jernbanevognfabrikk, a Norwegian railroad car manufacturer
- Eivind Skabo (1916–2006), Norwegian sprint canoeist
