= Piet Bakker =

Piet Bakker may refer to:

- Piet Bakker (writer) (1897–1960), Dutch journalist and author
- Piet Bakker (canoeist), Dutch sprint canoeist
