= Poul Agger =

Danish sprint canoeist

Medal record

Men's canoe sprint

World Championships
| Silver medal – second place | 1950 Copenhagen | K-1 4 x 500 m |
| Bronze medal – third place | 1948 London | K-1 500 m |
| Bronze medal – third place | 1948 London | K-1 4 x 500 m |

Poul Agger is a Danish sprint canoeist who competed in the late 1940s and early 1950s. He won three medals at the ICF Canoe Sprint World Championships with a silver (K-1 4 x 500 m: 1950) and two bronze (K-1 500 m and K-1 4 x 500 m: both 1948).

Note that the K-1 500 m and K-1 4 x 500 m events were separate from the canoeing competitions at the 1948 Summer Olympics in London. The K-1 500 m has been in the Summer Olympics since the 1976 Games in Montreal while the K-1 4 x 500 m event was only held once at the 1960 Games in Rome.
