= Bærum KK =

Norwegian canoe racing club

Logo.

Bærum Kajakklubb is a sports club from Bærum, Norway.

Established in 1935, its only sport is canoe racing. It is based at Kalvøya outside of Sandvika, and has shared the locality with the rowing club Bærum RK since 1972.

Well-known members include Ivar Mathisen, Knut Østby, Harald Eriksen, Andreas Orheim, Geir Kvillum, Steinar Amundsen, Øyvind Amundsen, Harald Amundsen and Hege Brannsten.
