= Alfons Jeżewski =

Polish canoeist

Personal information
- Born: 14 February 1914 Poznań, Poland
- Died: 10 April 1983 (aged 69) Poznań, Poland

Sport
- Country: Poland
- Sport: Canoeing / Kayaking

Alfons Jeżewski (14 February 1914 – 10 April 1983) was a Polish sprint canoeist who competed in the late 1940s.

At the 1948 Summer Olympics in London, Jeżewski finished tenth in the K-2 10000 m event while being eliminated in the heats of the K-2 1000 m event.
