= Thomas Horton (canoeist) =

American canoeist

Thomas Frederick Horton (May 11, 1926 – July 28, 2014) was an American sprint canoer who competed in the late 1940s and the early 1950s. Competing in two Summer Olympics, he was eliminated in the heats for both events he competed (1948: K-1 1000 m, 1952: K-2 1000 m). Horton's best finish in those heats was fifth in the 1952 K-2 1000 m event.
