= René Flèche =

French canoeist

René Flèche was a French canoe sprinter who competed in the late 1940s. He finished 12th in the K-2 10000 m event at the 1948 Summer Olympics in London.
