= Henry Harper (canoeist) =

Canadian canoeist

Hank J. "Henry" Harper (February 21, 1929 – August 5, 1957) was a Canadian sprint canoeist who competed in the late 1940s. At the 1948 Summer Olympics in London, he finished seventh in the K-2 1000 m and 14th in the K-2 10000 m event. After returning from the Olympics, Harper joined the police force in his hometown of Gananoque, Ontario, and later the Ontario Provincial Police. He died in 1957 after being hit by a motorist while directing traffic around an accident. He was 28 years old.
