= Ingemar Hedberg =

Swedish canoeist (1920–2019)

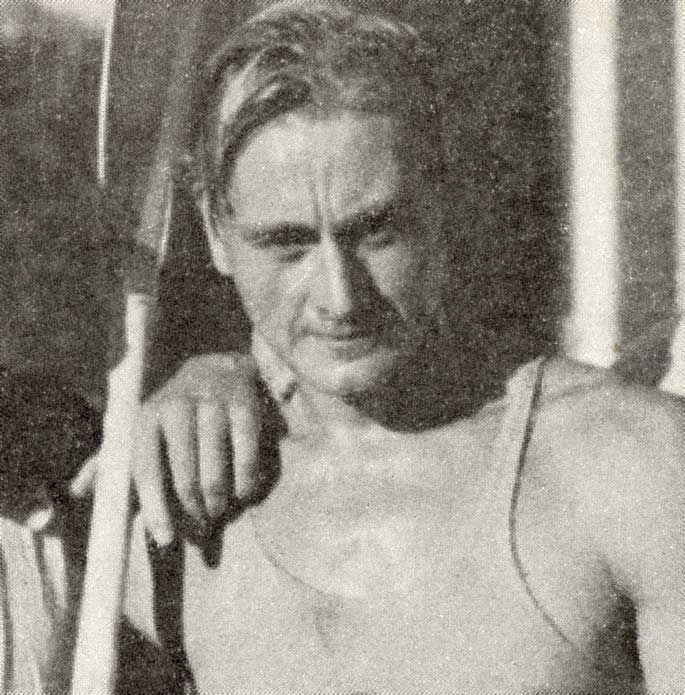

Personal information
- Full name: Ingemar Harald Robert Hedberg
- Born: 8 March 1920 Örebro, Sweden
- Died: 19 May 2019 (aged 99) Stockholm, Sweden

Sport
- Sport: Canoe sprint
- Club: Brunnsvikens Kanotklubb, Stockholm
Medal record
Representing Sweden
Olympic Games
Silver medal – second place	1952 Helsinki	K-2 1000 m
World Championships
Gold medal – first place	1950 Copenhagen	K-1 4×500 m
Gold medal – first place	1950 Copenhagen	K-2 500 m
Gold medal – first place	1950 Copenhagen	K-2 1000 m

Ingemar Harald Robert Hedberg (8 March 1920 – 19 May 2019) was a Swedish sprint canoeist who competed in the early 1950s. He won the silver medal in the K-2 1000 m event at the 1952 Summer Olympics in Helsinki. Hedberg also won three gold medals at the 1950 ICF Canoe Sprint World Championships in Copenhagen, earning them in the K-1 4×500 m, K-2 500 m, and K-2 1000 m events. He died in May 2019 at the age of 99.
