= Jochem Bobeldijk =

Dutch canoeist (1920–2010)

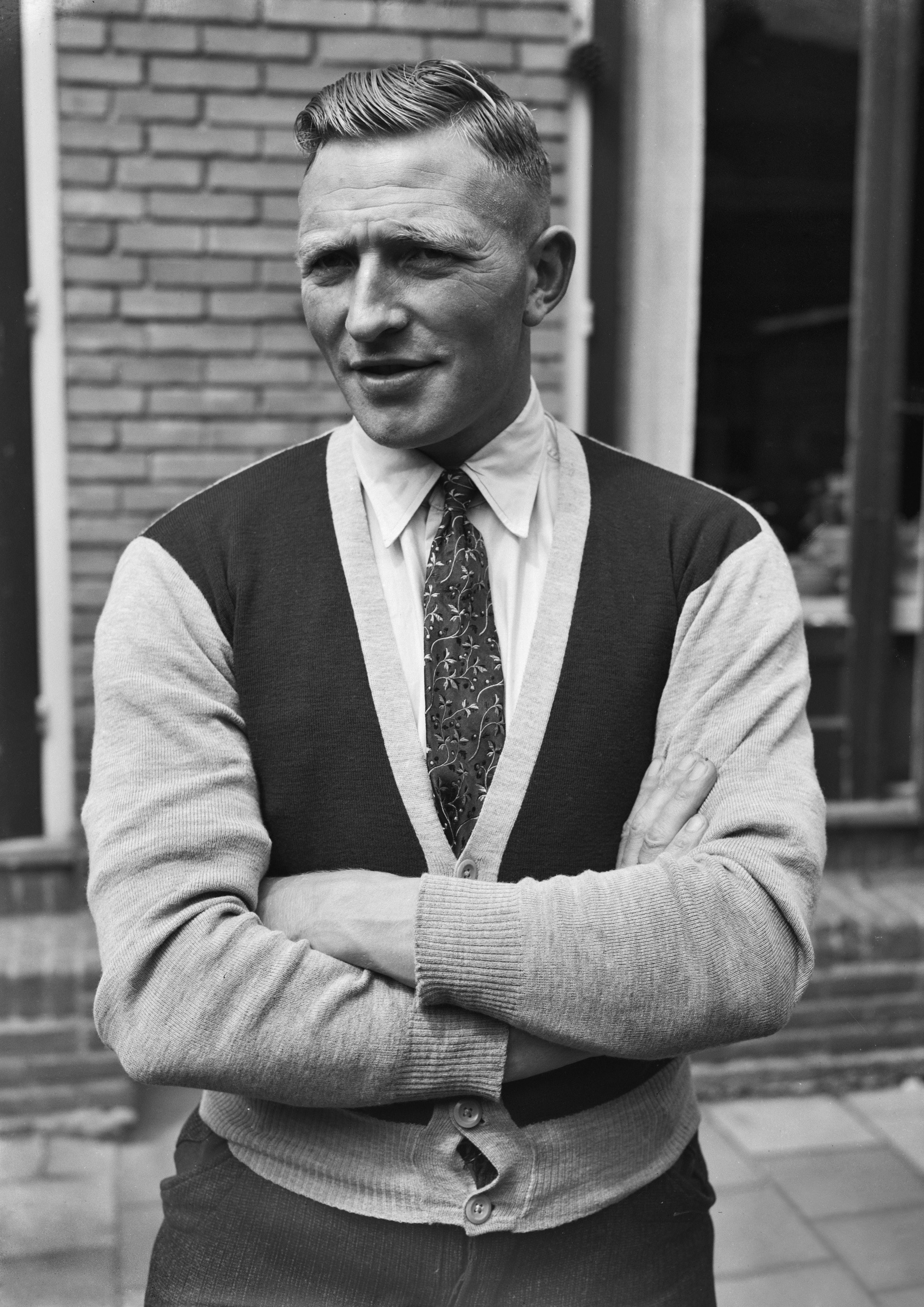
Jochem Bobeldijk (1952)

Jochem Bobeldijk (12 April 1920 Zaandam – 18 November 2010, Egmond aan Zee) was a Dutch sprint canoer who competed in the late 1940s and the early 1950s. Competing in two Summer Olympics, he earned his best finish of sixth in the K-1 10000 m event at London in 1948.
