= Walter Piemann =

Austrian canoeist (1926–1965)

Medal record

Men's canoe sprint

World Championships
Silver medal – second place	1948 London	K-4 1000 m
Bronze medal – third place	1950 Copenhagen	K-4 10000 m

Walter Piemann (14 November 1926 – 1965) was an Austrian sprint canoeist who competed in the late 1940s and early 1950s. He won two medals at the ICF Canoe Sprint World Championships with a silver (K-4 1000 m: 1948) and a bronze (K-4 10000 m: 1950). Piemann also competed at the 1948 Summer Olympics in London, finishing eighth in the K-1 1000 m and ninth in the K-2 10000 m events.
