= Jan Matocha =

Czechoslovak spring canoer

Jan Matocha (5 January 1923 – 11 October 2016) was a Czechoslovak sprint canoer who competed in the late 1940s and early 1950s. Competing in two Summer Olympics, he finished ninth in the K-1 10000 m event at London in 1948. He was born in Střelná.
