= Ota Kroutil =

Czech sprint canoeist (1921–1997)

Medal record

Men's canoe sprint

World Championships
Bronze medal – third place	1948 London	K-4 1000 m

Otakar Kroutil (31 December 1921 – 1997) was a Czech sprint canoeist who competed in the late 1940s and early 1950s for Czechoslovakia. He won a bronze medal in the K-4 1000 m event at the 1948 ICF Canoe Sprint World Championships in London.

== Biography ==
Kroutil was born in Dobřichovice on 31 December 1921.

He also competed in two Summer Olympics, earning his best finish of fifth in the K-2 1000 m event at London in 1948.

Kroutil died in 1997.
