= Raymond Richez =

French canoeist

Raymond Richez was a French sprint canoer who competed in the late 1940s. He was eliminated in the heats of the K-2 1000 m event at the 1948 Summer Olympics in London.
