= Lars Petterson =

Swedish canoeist

Medal record

Men's canoe sprint

World Championships
| Bronze medal – third place | 1950 Copenhagen | K-1 1000 m |

Lars Petterson is a Swedish sprint canoeist who competed in the early 1950s. He won a bronze medal in the K-1 1000 m event at the 1950 ICF Canoe Sprint World Championships in Copenhagen.
