= Ingvard Nørregaard =

Danish canoeist

Medal record

Men's canoe sprint

World Championships
Silver medal – second place	1950 Copenhagen	K-2 10000 m

Ingvard Nørregaard (13 May 1914 – 11 October 1985) was a Danish sprint canoer who competed in the early 1950s. He won a silver medal in the K-2 10000 m event at the 1950 ICF Canoe Sprint World Championships in Copenhagen.

Nørregaard also finished eighth in the K-2 10000 m event at the 1952 Summer Olympics in Helsinki.
