= 1950 ICF Canoe Sprint World Championships =

International canoe competition

The 1950 ICF Canoe Sprint World Championships were held in Copenhagen, Denmark. This event was held under the International Canoe Federation.

The men's competition consisted of four Canadian (single paddle, open boat) and nine kayak events. Two events were held for the women, both in kayak. Events that debuted at these championships were C-1 10000 m and K-4 10000 m.

This was the third championships in canoe sprint.

== Medal summary ==
=== Men's ===
==== Canoe ====
Event	Gold	Time	Silver	Time	Bronze	Time
C-1 1000 m	Josef Holeček (TCH)		Robert Boutigny (FRA)		Bengt Backlund (SWE)	
C-1 10000 m	Robert Boutigny (FRA)		Josef Holeček (TCH)		Bengt Backlund (SWE)	
C-2 1000 m	Czechoslovakia; Jan Brzák-Felix; Bohumil Kudma		France; Georges Dransart; Armand Loreau		Czechoslovakia; Václáv Havel; Jiří Pecka	
C-2 10000 m	Czechoslovakia; Jan Brzák-Felix; Bohumil Kudma		France; Georges Dransart; Armand Loreau		Czechoslovakia; Bohuslav Karlík; Oldřich Lomecký	

==== Kayak ====
Event	Gold	Time	Silver	Time	Bronze	Time
K-1 500 m	Johann Kobberup (DEN)		Lennart Klingström (SWE)		Andreas Lind (DEN)	
K-1 1000 m	Gert Fredriksson (SWE)		Thorvald Strömberg (FIN)		Lars Petterson (SWE)	
K-1 10000 m	Thorvald Strömberg (FIN)		Gert Fredriksson (SWE)		Arne Jansson (SWE)	
K-1 4 x 500 m relay	Sweden; Lars Glassér; Ingermar Hedberg; Lennart Klingström; Gert Fredriksson		Denmark; Poul Agger; Andreas Lind; Ejvind Hansen; Johan Kobberup		Austria; Herbert Klepp; Max Raub; Herbert Wiedermann; Günther Rührnschopf	
K-2 500 m	Sweden; Lars Glassér; Ingermar Hedberg		Sweden; Henry Pettersson; Berndt Häppling		Austria; Max Raub; Herbert Wiedermann	
K-2 1000 m	Sweden; Lars Glassér; Ingermar Hedberg		Norway; Ivar Mathisen; Knut Østby		Netherlands; Piet Bakker; Harrie Koorstra	
K-2 10000 m	Sweden; Gunnar Akerhund; Hans Wetterström		Denmark; Svend Frømming; Ingvar Nørregaard		Sweden; Karl-Erick Björk; Per-Olav Olsson	
K-4 1000 m	Sweden; Einar Pihl; Hans Eirksson; Lars Pettersson; Harry Johansson		Sweden; Gunnar Åkerlund; Ebbe Frick; Sven-Olov Sjödelius; Hans Wetterström		Austria; Herbert Klepp; Walter Frühwirth; Hans Ortner; Paul Felinger	
K-4 10000 m	Sweden; Karl Andersson; Stig Andersson; Gösta Gustavsson; Berndt Häppling		Sweden; Karl-Erick Björk; Per-Olav Olsson; Klas Norgren; Arne Jannson		Austria; Walter Piemann; Alfred Schmidtberger; Otto Lochner; Alfred Krammer	

=== Women's ===
==== Kayak ====
Event	Gold	Time	Silver	Time	Bronze	Time
K-1 500 m	Sylvi Saimo (FIN)		Karen Hoff (DEN)		Fritzi Schwingl (AUT)	
K-2 500 m	Finland; Sylvi Saimo; Greta Grönholm		Austria; Trude Leibhart; Fritzi Schwingl		Sweden; Ingrid Wallgren; Lisa Lundberg	

== Medals table ==
Rank	Nation	Gold	Silver	Bronze	Total
1	Sweden (SWE)	7	5	6	18
2	Czechoslovakia (TCH)	3	1	2	6
3	Finland (FIN)	3	1	0	4
4	Denmark (DEN)	1	3	1	5
5	France (FRA)	1	3	0	4
6	Austria (AUT)	0	1	5	6
7	Norway (NOR)	0	1	0	1
8	Netherlands (NED)	0	0	1	1
Totals (8 entries)		15	15	15	45
