= Raymond Clark (canoeist) =

American canoeist

Raymond Clark (November 16, 1924 in Louisville, Kentucky – December 1, 1990) was an American sprint canoer who competed in the late 1940s. At the 1948 Summer Olympics in London, he finished 13th in the K-2 10000 m event while being eliminated in the heats of the K-2 1000 m event.
