= Wim Pool =

Dutch canoeist

Willem "Wim" Pool (born 20 March 1927) is a Dutch former sprint canoer who competed in the late 1940s. At the 1948 Summer Olympics in London, he finished sixth in the K-2 1000 m event. He was born in Amsterdam.
