= Hilaire Deprez =

Belgian canoeist

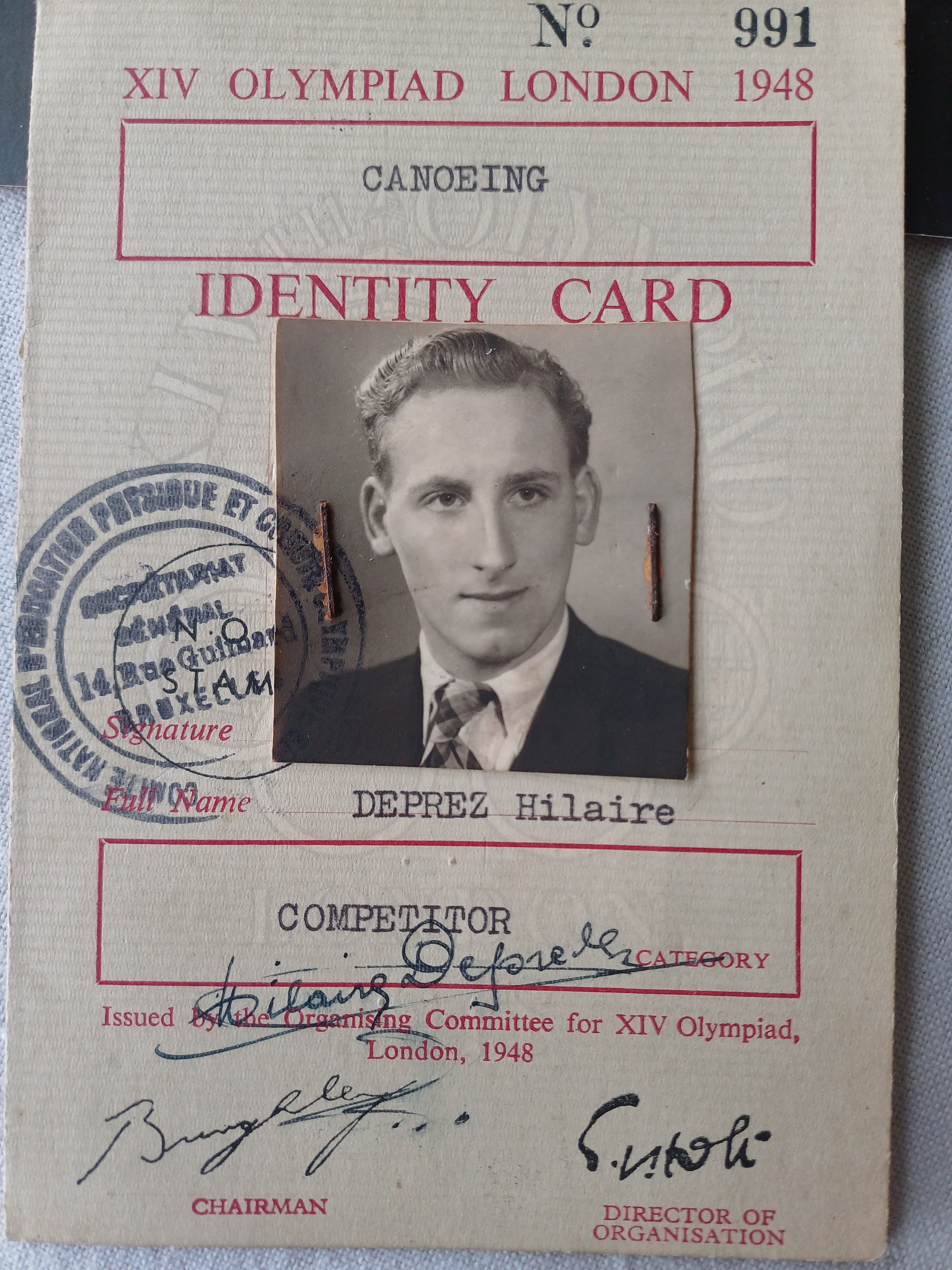
Hilaire Deprez (1948 Olympics)

Hilaire Deprez (Kortrijk, 25 February 1922 – Esneux, 15 September 1957) was a Belgian canoe sprinter who competed in the late 1940s and early 1950s. Competing in two Summer Olympics, he earned his best finish of eighth in the K-2 10000 m event at London in 1948.
