= Herbert Klepp =

Austrian canoeist (1923–1976)

Medal record

Men's canoe sprint

World Championships
Silver medal – second place	1948 London	K-4 1000 m
Bronze medal – third place	1950 Copenhagen	K-1 4 x 500 m
Bronze medal – third place	1950 Copenhagen	K-4 1000 m

Herbert Klepp (14 May 1923 – 4 June 1976) was an Austrian sprint canoeist who competed in the late 1940s and early 1950s. He won three medals at the ICF Canoe Sprint World Championships with a silver (K-4 1000 m: 1948) and two bronzes (K-1 4 x 500 m and K-4 1000 m: both 1950).

Klepp was born in Vienna on 14 May 1923. He also competed at the 1948 Summer Olympics in London, earning his best finish tenth in the K-1 10000 m event. Klepp also competed in the K-2 1000 m event, but was eliminated in the heats.

Klepp died in Vienna on 4 June 1976, at the age of 53.

== Sources ==
- Evans, Hilary; Gjerde, Arild; Heijmans, Jeroen; Mallon, Bill; et al. "Herbert Klepp". Olympics at Sports-Reference.com. Sports Reference LLC. Archived from the original on 2012-10-20.
- Herbert Klepp at Olympedia
