= Joyce Richards =

British canoeist

Joyce Richards (17 December 1920 – 10 November 2005) was a British sprint canoeist who competed in the late 1940s. She was eliminated in the heats of the K-1 500 m event at the 1948 Summer Olympics in London.
