= Gunnar Åkerlund =

Swedish canoeist (1923–2006)

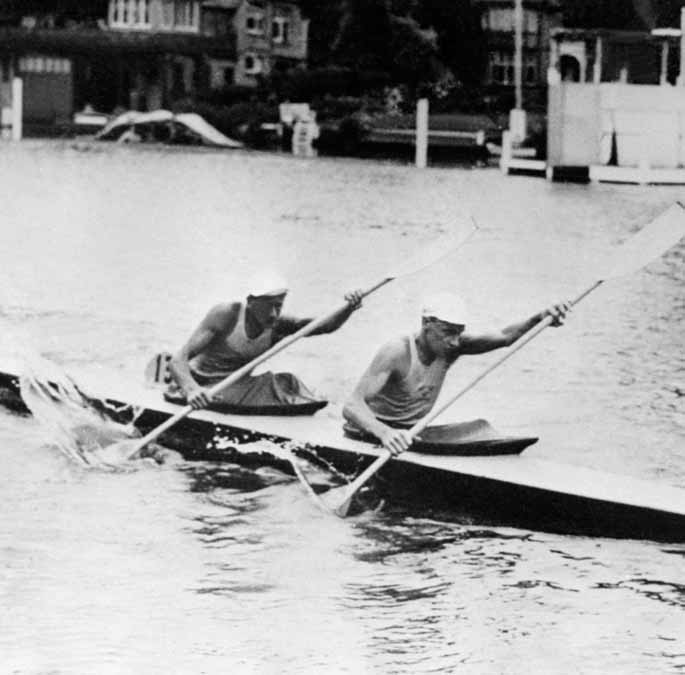
- Åkerlund & Hans Wetterström at 1948 Olympics

Personal information
- Full name: Ernst Gunnar Åkerlund
- Born: 20 November 1923 Nyköping, Sweden
- Died: 4 October 2006 (aged 82) Nyköping, Sweden

Sport
- Sport: Canoe sprint
- Club: Nyköpings Kanotklubb
Medal record
Representing Sweden
Olympic Games
Gold medal – first place	1948 London	K-2 10000 m
Silver medal – second place	1952 Helsinki	K-2 10000 m
World Championships
Gold medal – first place	1948 London	K-4 1000 m
Gold medal – first place	1950 Copenhagen	K-2 10000 m
Silver medal – second place	1950 Copenhagen	K-4 1000 m

Ernst Gunnar Åkerlund (20 November 1923 – 4 October 2006) was a Swedish canoe sprinter who competed in the late 1940s and early 1950s. He won two Olympic medals in the K-2 10000 m event: a gold in 1948 and a silver in 1952.

Åkerlund won three medals at the ICF Canoe Sprint World Championships with two golds (K-2 10000 m: 1950, K-4 1000 m: 1948) and a silver (K-4 1000 m: 1950).
