= John Simmons (canoeist) =

British canoeist

John Simmons (16 July 1912 – 25 June 2005) was a British canoe sprinter who competed in the late 1940s. At the 1948 Summer Olympics in London, he was eliminated in the heats of the K-2 1000 m event.
