= Alfred Krammer =

Austrian canoeist

Medal record

Men's canoe sprint

World Championships
Bronze medal – third place	1950 Copenhagen	K-4 10000 m

Alfred Krammer was an Austrian sprint canoer who competed in the early 1950s. He won a bronze medal in the K-4 10000 m event at the 1950 ICF Canoe Sprint World Championships in Copenhagen.
