= Bruno Masciadri =

Swiss canoeist 1914–2001

Bruno Masciardi (24 February 1914 – 8 May 2001) was a Swiss canoe sprinter who competed in the late 1940s. At the 1948 Summer Olympics in London, he was eliminated in the heats of the K-2 1000 m event. He was born in Basel, where he also died.
