= Hendrik Stroo =

Dutch canoeist

Henrdrik Pieter "Harry" Stroo (2 October 1927, Zaandam – 18 July 1991, Zaandam) was a Dutch sprint canoer who competed in the late 1940s. He finished sixth in the K-2 10000 m event at the 1948 Summer Olympics in London.
