= Alfred Umgeher =

Austrian canoeist (1926–2013)

Medal record

Men's canoe sprint

World Championships
Silver medal – second place	1948 London	K-4 1000 m

Alfred Umgeher (3 October 1926 – 2 November 2013) was an Austrian sprint canoer who competed in the late 1940s. He won a silver medal in the K-4 1000 m event at the 1948 ICF Canoe Sprint World Championships in London. Umgeher also competed at the 1948 Summer Olympics in London, finishing ninth in the K-2 10000 m event.
