= Sylvi Saimo =

Finnish sprint canoeist (1914–2004)

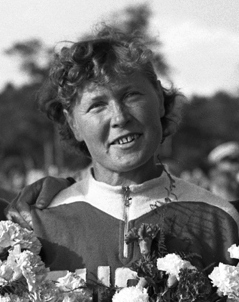
- Saimo at the 1952 Olympics

Personal information
- Born: 12 November 1914 Jaakkima, Finland
- Died: 12 March 2004 (aged 89) Laukaa, Finland
- Height: 170 cm (5 ft 7 in)
- Weight: 59–62 kg (130–137 lb)

Sport
- Sport: Canoe sprint
Medal record
Representing Finland
Olympic Games
Gold medal – first place	1952 Helsinki	K-1 500 m
World Championships
Gold medal – first place	1950 Copenhagen	K-1 500 m
Gold medal – first place	1950 Copenhagen	K-2 500 m

Sylvi Riitta Saimo (née Sikiö, 12 November 1914 – 12 March 2004) was a Finnish sprint canoeist and politician. She was the first female Finnish Olympic Champion at the Summer Olympics, winning a gold medal in K-1 500 m at the 1952 Summer Olympics. She also competed in cross-country skiing, athletics and orienteering. She was a member of the Finnish Parliament from 1966 to 1978.

== Personal life ==
Saimo was born in the former Finnish municipality of Jaakkima (currently Lakhdenpokhsky District, Russia) on 12 November 1914. She died in Laukaa in 2004.

== Sports career ==
Saimo competed in several sports, including skiing, athletics, orienteering and canoeing. She won a gold medal in the K-1 500 m event at the 1952 Summer Olympics and finished sixth in 1948. That was first and only gold medal by Finnish woman at Summer Olympics, until Heli Rantanen won the javelin throw contest in 1996.

Saimo also won two gold medals at the 1950 ICF Canoe Sprint World Championships in Copenhagen, earning them in the K-1 500 m and K-2 500 m events (in K-2, jointly with Greta Grönholm).

Other sports achievements include winning a bronze medal at the Finnish championship in orienteering in 1939. In cross-country skiing, she won a bronze medal in the relay at the Finnish championships in 1947, while placing 5th individually in the 10 km distance.

== Political career ==
Saimo was elected representative to the Finnish Parliament for the Centre Party from 1966 to 1978.

== See also ==
- List of Finnish Members of Parliament
