= Günther Rührnschopf =

Austrian canoeist

Medal record

Men's canoe sprint

World Championships
Bronze medal – third place	1950 Copenhagen	K-1 4 x 500 m

Günter Rührnschopf, (born 1928 in Pöchlarn, Austria, died 2003) was an Austrian sprint canoer who competed in the early 1950s. He won a bronze medal in the K-1 4 x 500 m event at the 1950 ICF Canoe Sprint World Championships in Copenhagen.
