= Gyula Andrási =

Hungarian canoeist (1927–1950)

Gyula Andrási (1927 – 24 September 1950) was a Hungarian sprint canoer who competed in the late 1940s. He finished fifth in the K-2 10000 m event at the 1948 Summer Olympics in London. Andrási died in Siófok on 24 September 1950.

== Sources ==
- Gyula Andrási's profile at Sports Reference.com
