= Klas Norgren =

Swedish canoeist

Medal record

Men's canoe sprint

World Championships
Silver medal – second place	1950 Copenhagen	K-4 10000 m

Klas Norgren is a Swedish sprint canoer who competed in the early 1950s. He won a silver medal in the K-4 10000 m event at the 1950 ICF Canoe Sprint World Championships in Copenhagen.
