= Alida van der Anker-Doedens =

Dutch canoeist (1922–2014)

Olympic medal record

Women's canoe sprint

Representing the Netherlands
| Silver medal – second place | 1948 London | K-1 500 m |

Alida Geertruida "Lida" van der Anker-Doedens (28 July 1922 – 1 April 2014) was a Dutch sprint canoeist who competed in the late 1940s and early 1950s. Competing in two Summer Olympics, she won a silver medal in the K-1 500 m event at London in 1948. She was born in Rolde and died at 91 years in Haarlem.
