= Franz Reiner =

Swiss canoeist (1912–1996)

Joseph Franz Reiner (26 November 1912 – 16 January 1996) was a Swiss sprint canoer who competed in the late 1940s. During the 1948 Summer Olympics in London, he was eliminated in the heats of the K-2 1000 m event. Reiner died in Basel on 16 January 1996, at the age of 83.

== Sources ==
- Evans, Hilary; Gjerde, Arild; Heijmans, Jeroen; Mallon, Bill; et al. "Franz Reiner". Olympics at Sports-Reference.com. Sports Reference LLC. Archived from the original on 2012-01-31.
