= Lars Glassér =

Swedish sprint canoeist

Personal information
- Full name: Lars Bertil Glassér
- Born: 4 October 1925 Stockholm, Sweden
- Died: 15 January 1999 (aged 73) Rättvik, Sweden
Medal record
Men's canoe sprint
Representing Sweden
Olympic Games
Silver medal – second place	1952 Helsinki	K-2 1000 m
World Championships
Gold medal – first place	1948 London	K-1 4 x 500 m
Gold medal – first place	1950 Copenhagen	K-1 4 x 500 m
Gold medal – first place	1950 Copenhagen	K-2 500 m
Gold medal – first place	1950 Copenhagen	K-2 1000 m
Gold medal – first place	1954 Mâcon	K-1 4 x 500 m
Silver medal – second place	1948 London	K-1 500 m

Lars Bertil Glassér (4 October 1925 – 15 January 1999) was a Swedish sprint canoeist who competed in the late 1940s and early 1950s. He won the silver medal in the K-2 1000 m event at the 1952 Summer Olympics in Helsinki.

Glasser also won six medals at the ICF Canoe Sprint World Championships with five golds (K-1 4 x 500 m: 1948, 1950, 1954; K-2 500 m: 1950, K-2 1000 m: 1950) and one silver (K-1 500 m: 1948). Note that the K-1 500 m, K-1 4 x 500 m, and K-2 500 m events were part of the International Canoe Federation's 1948 World Championships and not of the 1948 Summer Olympics, which was also in London. The K-1 4 x 500 m event was held at the Summer Olympics once at the 1960 Games in Rome while the K-1 500 m and K-2 500 m have been held at every Olympics since the 1976 Games in Montreal.
