= Bengt Backlund =

Swedish canoeist (1926–2006)

Medal record

Men's canoe sprint

World Championships
Bronze medal – third place	1950 Copenhagen	C-1 1000 m
Bronze medal – third place	1950 Copenhagen	C-1 10000 m

Bengt Backlund (3 March 1926 – 11 July 2006) was a Swedish flatwater canoer who competed in the early 1950s. He won two bronze medals at the 1950 ICF Canoe Sprint World Championships, earning them in the C-1 1000 m and the C-1 1000m m events.

Backlund also finished fourth in the C-1 10000 m event at the 1952 Summer Olympics in Helsinki.
