= Walter Frühwirth =

Medal record

Men's canoe sprint

World Championships
Bronze medal – third place	1950 Copenhagen	K-4 1000 m

Walter Frühwirth is an Austrian sprint canoer who competed in the early 1950s. He won a bronze medal in the K-4 1000 m at the 1950 ICF Canoe Sprint World Championships in Copenhagen.
