= Berndt Häppling =

Swedish canoeist

Medal record

Men's canoe sprint

World Championships
Gold medal – first place	1950 Copenhagen	K-4 1000 m
Silver medal – second place	1950 Copenhagen	K-2 500 m

Berndt Häppling (29 April 1917 - 10 November 2014) was a Swedish sprint canoer who competed in the early 1950s. He won two medals at the 1950 ICF Canoe Sprint World Championships in Copenhagen with a gold in the K-4 1000 m and a silver in the K-2 500 m events.
