= Jean Nickels =

Luxembourgish canoeist

Jean Nickels (30 January 1917 – 3 March 1985) was a Luxembourgish sprint canoeist who competed in the late 1940s. At the 1948 Summer Olympics in London, he finished 15th in the K-2 10000 m event while being eliminated in the heats of the K-2 1000 m event.
