= Ingrid Wallgren =

Swedish canoeist (1923–2016)

Medal record

Women's canoe sprint

World Championships
Bronze medal – third place	1950 Copenhagen	K-2 500 m

Ingrid Kristina Wallgren (née Ingrid Apelgren; 3 May 1923 – 6 February 2016) was a Swedish sprint canoeist who competed in the late 1940s and the early 1950s. She won a bronze medal in the K-2 500 m event at the 1950 ICF Canoe Sprint World Championships in Copenhagen. She was eliminated in the heats of the K-1 500 m event at the 1948 Summer Olympics in London. Wallgren died in February 2016 at the age of 92.
