= Fernand Donna =

French canoeist

Fernand Donna (30 January 1922 – 7 May 1988) was a French sprint canoeist who competed in the late 1940s. He was eliminated in the heats of the K-2 1000 m event at the 1948 Summer Olympics in London.
