= Vautrin (disambiguation) =

Vautrin is a fictional character from the novels of French writer Honoré de Balzac in the La Comédie humaine series.

== People ==
Vautrin is the French family name. It is from a pet form of the personal name Vautier, a regional variant of Gauthier.

- Catherine Vautrin (born 1960), French politician
- Claire Vautrin (1917–1995), French sprint canoer
- Irénée Vautrin (1888–1974), Canadian politician from Quebec
- Jean Vautrin (1933–2015), French writer
- Minnie Vautrin (1886–1941), American missionary renowned for saving the lives of many women at the Ginling Girls College in Nanjing, China, during the Nanking Massacre

== Film ==
- Vautrin (film), a 1943 French film directed by Pierre Billon

== Awards ==
- Vautrin Lud Prize, the highest award in the field of geography
