= Karel Lomecký =

Personal information
- Born: 4 November 1914
- Died: 13 December 2001 (aged 87)
Medal record
Men's canoe sprint
Representing Czechoslovakia
World Championships
Bronze medal – third place	1948 London	K-4 1000 m

Karel Lomecký (4 November 1914 – 13 December 2001) was a Czechoslovak canoe sprinter who competed in the late 1940s. He won a bronze medal in the K-4 1000 m event at the 1948 ICF Canoe Sprint World Championships in London. Lomecký also finished seventh in the K-2 10000 m event at the 1948 Summer Olympics in London.
