= Finn Rasmussen =

Danish sprint canoeist (1920–2015)

Medal record

Men's canoe sprint

World Championships
Silver medal – second place	1948 London	K-2 500 m

Finn Rasmussen (22 December 1920 – 18 July 2015) was a Danish sprint canoeist who competed in the late 1940s. He won a silver medal in the K-2 500 m event at the 1948 ICF Canoe Sprint World Championships in London.

Rasmussen competed at the 1948 Summer Olympics, also held in London, finishing fourth in the K-2 10000 m event. Note that the K-2 500 m event did not become an official event at the Summer Olympics until the 1976 Games in Montreal. The event has been on the Olympic program since then.
