= Jozef Massy =

Belgian canoeist

Jozef Massy (Sint-Niklaas, 20 August 1914 – Duffel, 28 February 2011) was a Belgian canoe sprinter who competed in the late 1940s. He finished eighth in the K-2 10000 m event at the 1948 Summer Olympics in London. He was born in Sint-Niklaas, Oost-Vlaanderen, Belgium and died in Duffel, Antwerp, Belgium.
