= Andreas Lind =

Medal record

Men's canoe sprint

World Championships
Silver medal – second place	1950 Copenhagen	K-1 4 x 500 m
Bronze medal – third place	1950 Copenhagen	K-1 500 m

Andreas Lind (13 July 1922 - 26 January 1982) was a Danish sprint canoeist who competed in the early 1950s. He won two medals at the 1950 ICF Canoe Sprint World Championships in Copenhagen with a silver in the K-1 4 x 500 m: and a bronze in the K-1 500 m.

Lind also competed at the 1952 Summer Olympics in Helsinki, finishing ninth in the K-2 1000 m event.
