= Armand Loreau =

French canoeist (1931–2022)

Medal record

Men's canoe sprint

World Championships
Silver medal – second place	1950 Copenhagen	C-2 1000 m
Silver medal – second place	1950 Copenhagen	C-2 10000 m

Armand Francois Loreau (30 July 1931 – 11 January 2022) was a French sprint canoer who competed in the early 1950s. He won two silver medals at the 1950 ICF Canoe Sprint World Championships, earning them in the C-2 1000 m and C-2 10000 m events. Loreau also finished fourth in the C-2 1000 m event at the 1952 Summer Olympics in Helsinki. Loreau died in Cargèse on 11 January 2022, at the age of 90.

== Sources ==
- "ICF medalists for Olympic and World Championships – Part 1: flatwater (now sprint): 1936–2007" (PDF). Archived (PDF) from the original on January 5, 2010.
- "ICF medalists for Olympic and World Championships – Part 2: rest of flatwater (now sprint) and remaining canoeing disciplines: 1936–2007" (PDF). Archived (PDF) from the original on 2009-11-09.
- Sports-reference.com Armand Loreau's profile at Sports Reference.com
