= Lars Pettersson (canoeist) =

Swedish canoeist

Medal record

Men's canoe sprint

World Championships
Gold medal – first place	1950 Copenhagen	K-4 1000 m

Lars Pettersson is a Swedish sprint canoer who competed in the early 1950s. He won a gold medal in the K-4 1000 m event at the 1950 ICF Canoe Sprint World Championships in Copenhagen.
