= Cees Gravesteijn =

Dutch canoeist (born 1928)

Cornelis "Cees" Gravesteijn (born 21 April 1928) is a Dutch retired sprint canoer who competed in the late 1940s. At the 1948 Summer Olympics in London, he finished sixth in the K-2 1000 m event. He was born in Wormer.

Gravesteijn, who turned 98 in April 2026, was noted as the oldest living Dutch Olympian.
