= Harry Åkerfelt =

Finnish canoeist (1915–2008)

Harry Åkerfelt (4 April 1915, Tvärminne – 21 July 2008) was a Finnish sprint canoeist who competed in the late 1940s. He finished sixth in the K-1 1000 m event at the 1948 Summer Olympics in London.
