= János Toldi =

Hungarian canoeist (1928–2024)

János Toldi (22 January 1928 – 22 January 2024) was a Hungarian sprint canoer who competed in the late 1940s. He was eliminated in the heats of the K-1 1000 m event at the 1948 Summer Olympics in London. Toldi died on 22 January 2024, his 96th birthday.

== Sources ==
- János Toldi's profile at Sports Reference.com
