= Dobřichovice =

- Town
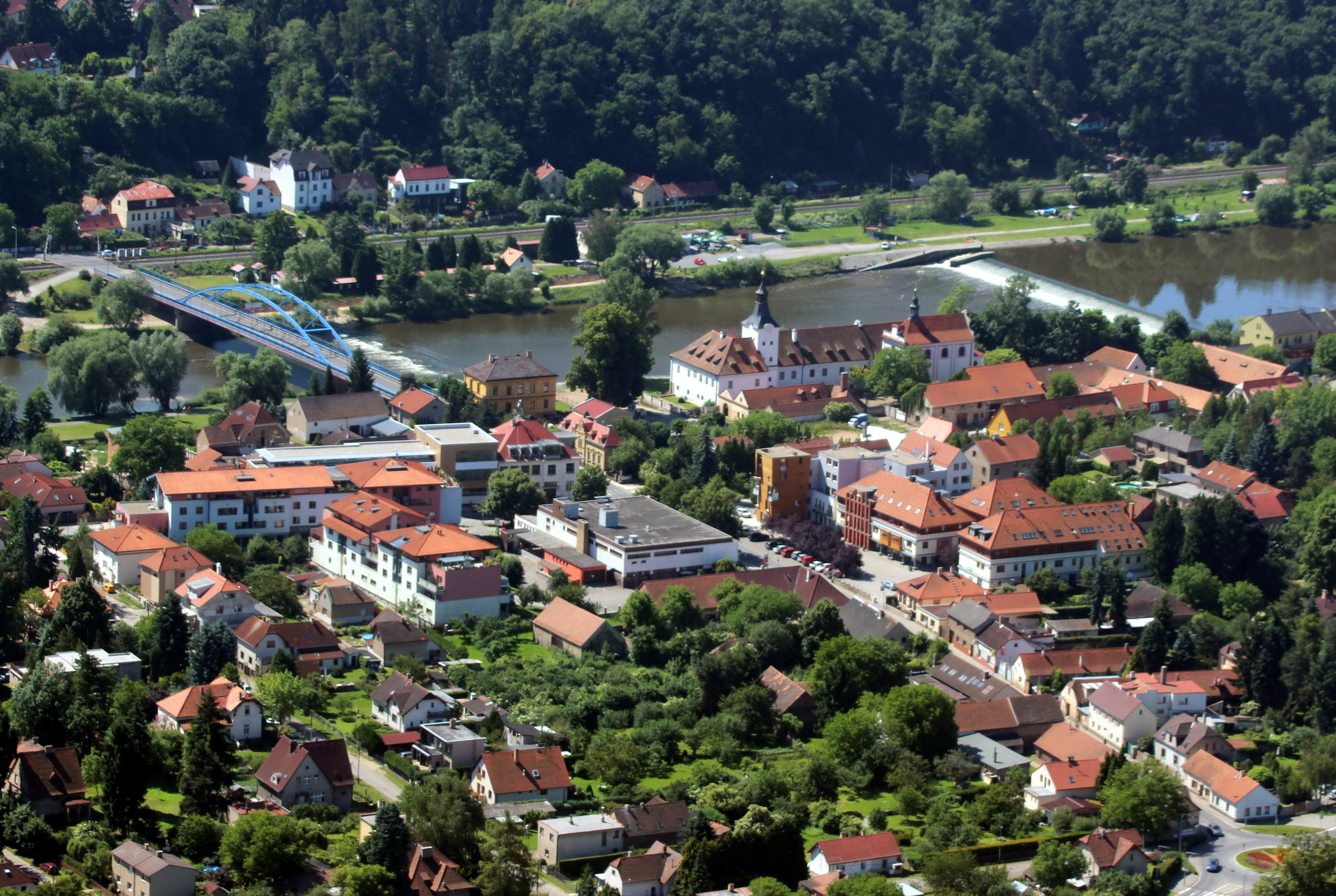
- Aerial view of the centre

- Flag Coat of arms

- Location in the Czech Republic
- Coordinates: 49°55′39″N 14°16′38″E
- Country: Czech Republic
- Region: Central Bohemian
- District: Prague-West
- First mentioned: 1253

Government
  - Mayor: Petr Hampl

Area
  - Total: 10.92 km^{2} (4.22 sq mi)
- Elevation: 205 m (673 ft)

Population (2026-01-01)
  - Total: 3,821
  - Density: 349.9/km^{2} (906.3/sq mi)
- Time zone: UTC+1 (CET)
  - Summer (DST): UTC+2 (CEST)
- Postal code: 252 29
- Website: www.dobrichovice.cz

Dobřichovice (Czech pronunciation: [ˈdobr̝ɪxovɪtsɛ]) is a town in Prague-West District in the Central Bohemian Region of the Czech Republic. It has about 3,800 inhabitants. The town is located on the Berounka River.

== Etymology ==
The initial name of the settlement was Dobrchovice. The name was derived from the personal name Dobrch, meaning "the village of Dobrch's people". Already in the 13th century, it was distored to Dobřichovice.

== Geography ==
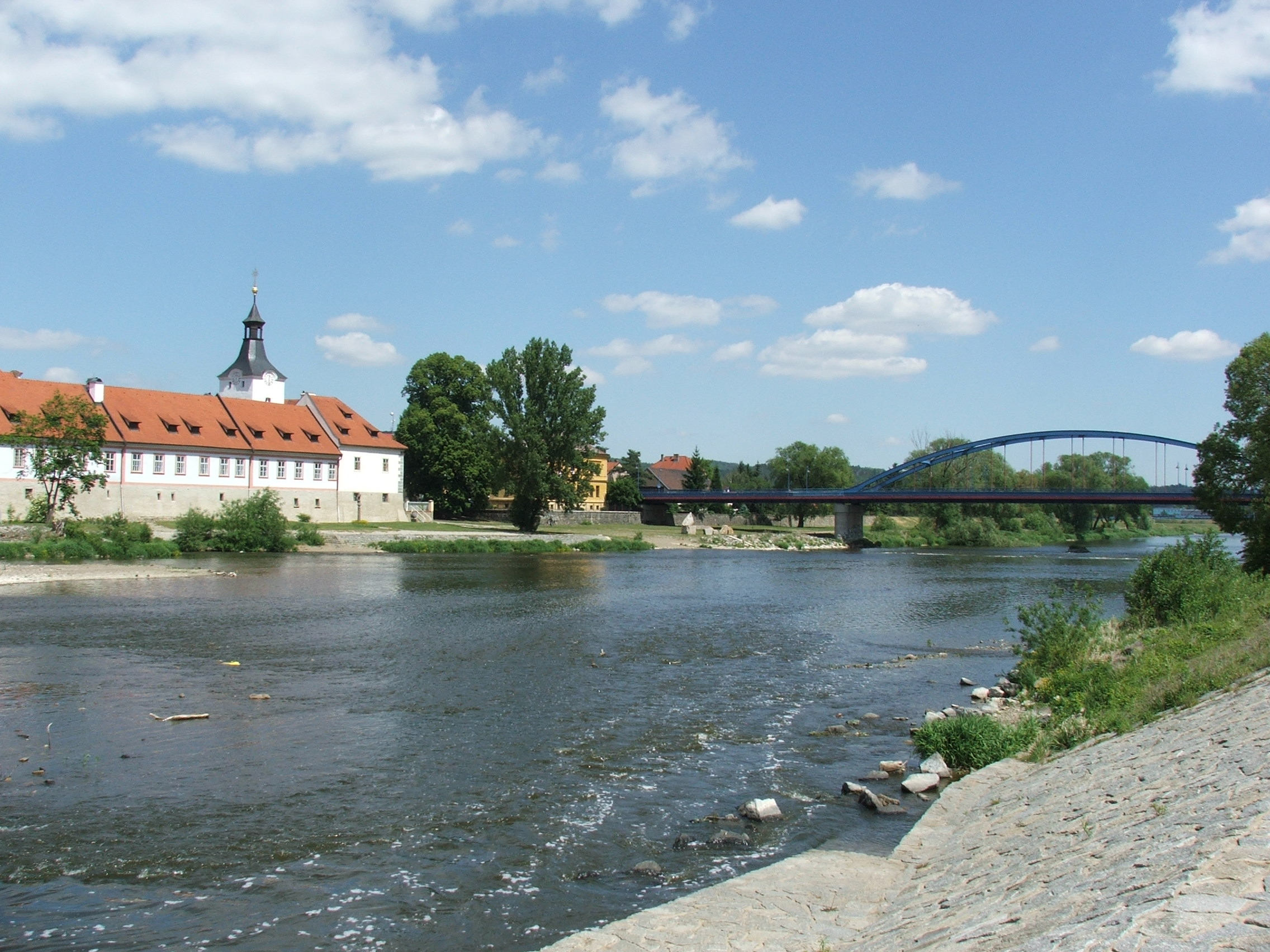
Berounka River and the castle

Dobřichovice is located about 14 kilometres (9 mi) southwest of Prague. The northern part of the municipal territory lies in the Hořovice Uplands and the southern part in the Brdy Highlands. The highest point is the Dobřich hill at 523 m (1,716 ft) above sea level. The town is situated on both banks of the Berounka River.

=== Climate ===
From 20 August 2012 to 27 June 2026, Dobřichovice recorded the highest temperature ever in the Czech Republic, with the heat registering 40.4 °C (104.7 °F).

Climate data for Dobřichovice, 1991–2020 normals, extremes 1999–present
Month	Jan	Feb	Mar	Apr	May	Jun	Jul	Aug	Sep	Oct	Nov	Dec	Year
Record high °C (°F)	15.8 (60.4)	20.6 (69.1)	25.0 (77.0)	31.0 (87.8)	35.0 (95.0)	38.8 (101.8)	38.1 (100.6)	40.4 (104.7)	35.2 (95.4)	29.8 (85.6)	20.2 (68.4)	18.2 (64.8)	40.4 (104.7)
Mean daily maximum °C (°F)	3.3 (37.9)	5.8 (42.4)	10.7 (51.3)	17.3 (63.1)	21.6 (70.9)	25.2 (77.4)	27.3 (81.1)	27.1 (80.8)	21.5 (70.7)	15.1 (59.2)	8.6 (47.5)	4.4 (39.9)	15.7 (60.3)
Daily mean °C (°F)	0.2 (32.4)	1.3 (34.3)	4.6 (40.3)	10.0 (50.0)	14.5 (58.1)	18.2 (64.8)	19.7 (67.5)	19.1 (66.4)	14.1 (57.4)	9.3 (48.7)	5.0 (41.0)	1.5 (34.7)	9.8 (49.6)
Mean daily minimum °C (°F)	−3.2 (26.2)	−2.8 (27.0)	−0.4 (31.3)	2.9 (37.2)	7.4 (45.3)	11.2 (52.2)	12.8 (55.0)	12.4 (54.3)	8.4 (47.1)	4.8 (40.6)	1.6 (34.9)	−1.6 (29.1)	4.5 (40.1)
Record low °C (°F)	−23.3 (−9.9)	−24.2 (−11.6)	−19.0 (−2.2)	−8.3 (17.1)	−2.3 (27.9)	−0.2 (31.6)	4.8 (40.6)	4.0 (39.2)	−1.4 (29.5)	−6.6 (20.1)	−8.5 (16.7)	−20.1 (−4.2)	−24.2 (−11.6)
Average precipitation mm (inches)	25.9 (1.02)	22.7 (0.89)	31.7 (1.25)	26.5 (1.04)	61.9 (2.44)	77.9 (3.07)	76.9 (3.03)	70.3 (2.77)	42.2 (1.66)	35.9 (1.41)	31.0 (1.22)	26.2 (1.03)	529.1 (20.83)
Average snowfall cm (inches)	11.8 (4.6)	8.6 (3.4)	3.2 (1.3)	0.0 (0.0)	0.0 (0.0)	0.0 (0.0)	0.0 (0.0)	0.0 (0.0)	0.0 (0.0)	0.1 (0.0)	1.2 (0.5)	6.4 (2.5)	31.3 (12.3)
Average relative humidity (%)	82.2	77.5	73.7	67.9	69.6	68.9	67.7	71.3	77.3	82.3	85.3	83.8	75.6
Source: Czech Hydrometeorological Institute

== History ==
The first written mention of Dobřichovice is from 6 April 1253, when it was donated to Knights of the Cross with the Red Star. With short breaks it was owned by this order throughout its existence. Dobřichovice Castle was built in the 16th century and rebuilt after a fire in 1779.

Due to its location, Dobřichovice often suffers from floods, the most destructive of which were in 1872, 1941 and 1947. Dobřichovice was also affected by 2002 European floods and more than 200 houses were severely damaged up to the ground floor. The flood also destroyed a 30-year-old footbridge which has since been replaced by a new one.

In 1876, Dobřichovice was promoted to a market town. Dobřichovice was proclaimed a town in 2006.

== Demographics ==
Historical population

Year	Pop.	±%
1869	683	—
1880	699	+2.3%
1890	689	−1.4%
1900	677	−1.7%
1910	851	+25.7%

Year	Pop.	±%
1921	1,162	+36.5%
1930	1,531	+31.8%
1950	2,120	+38.5%
1961	2,500	+17.9%
1970	2,328	−6.9%

Year	Pop.	±%
1980	2,424	+4.1%
1991	2,438	+0.6%
2001	2,777	+13.9%
2011	3,410	+22.8%
2021	3,669	+7.6%

Source: Censuses

== Transport ==
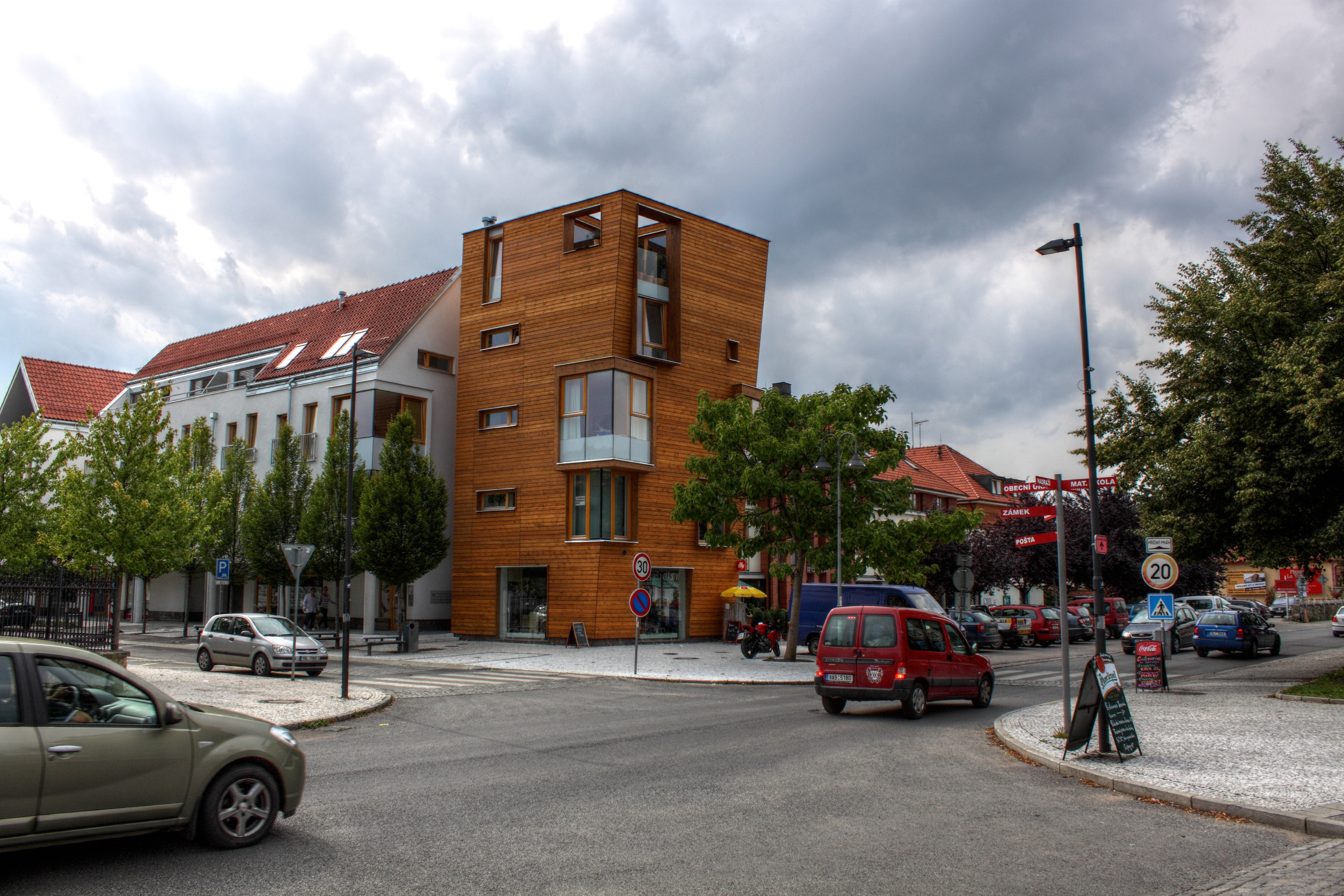
The square Palackého náměstí

Dobřichovice is located on the railway line Prague–Beroun.

== Sights ==
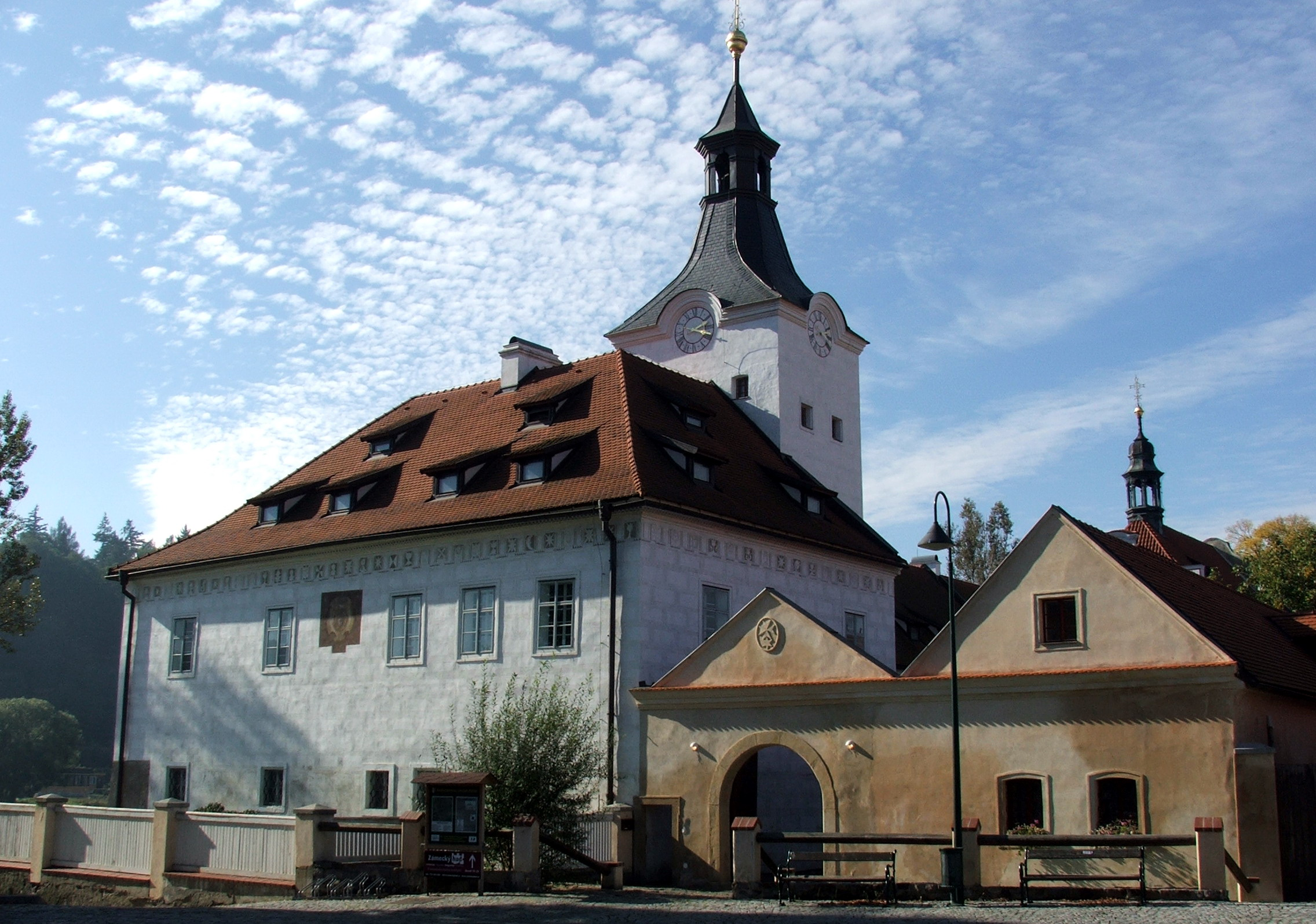
Dobřichovice Castle

The Dobřichovice Castle retains its Baroque appearance from the 18th century. The castle Chapel of Saint Jude the Apostle next to the castle was built in 1679. Until 1948, the castle served as a summer residence of the grand masters of Knights of the Cross with the Red Star. Today it is owned again by the order and inaccessible to the public.

An architectural monument is the Villa Pellé. It was built in the Neoclassical style in 1882–1883. Among the owners of the village were General Maurice Pellé and the painter Zdenka Braunerová, who decorated the house with a wall painting with folk Moravian Slovak motifs.

== Notable people ==
- Ota Kroutil (1921–1997), sprint canoer
- Ludvík Vaculík (1926–2015), writer; lived and died here
- Lenka Kotková (born 1973), astronomer
- Zuzana Čížková (born 1982), painter and sculptor; lives and works here

== Twin towns – sister cities ==
Dobřichovice is twinned with:

- Manhattan, United States
- Villieu-Loyes-Mollon, France

== Gallery ==
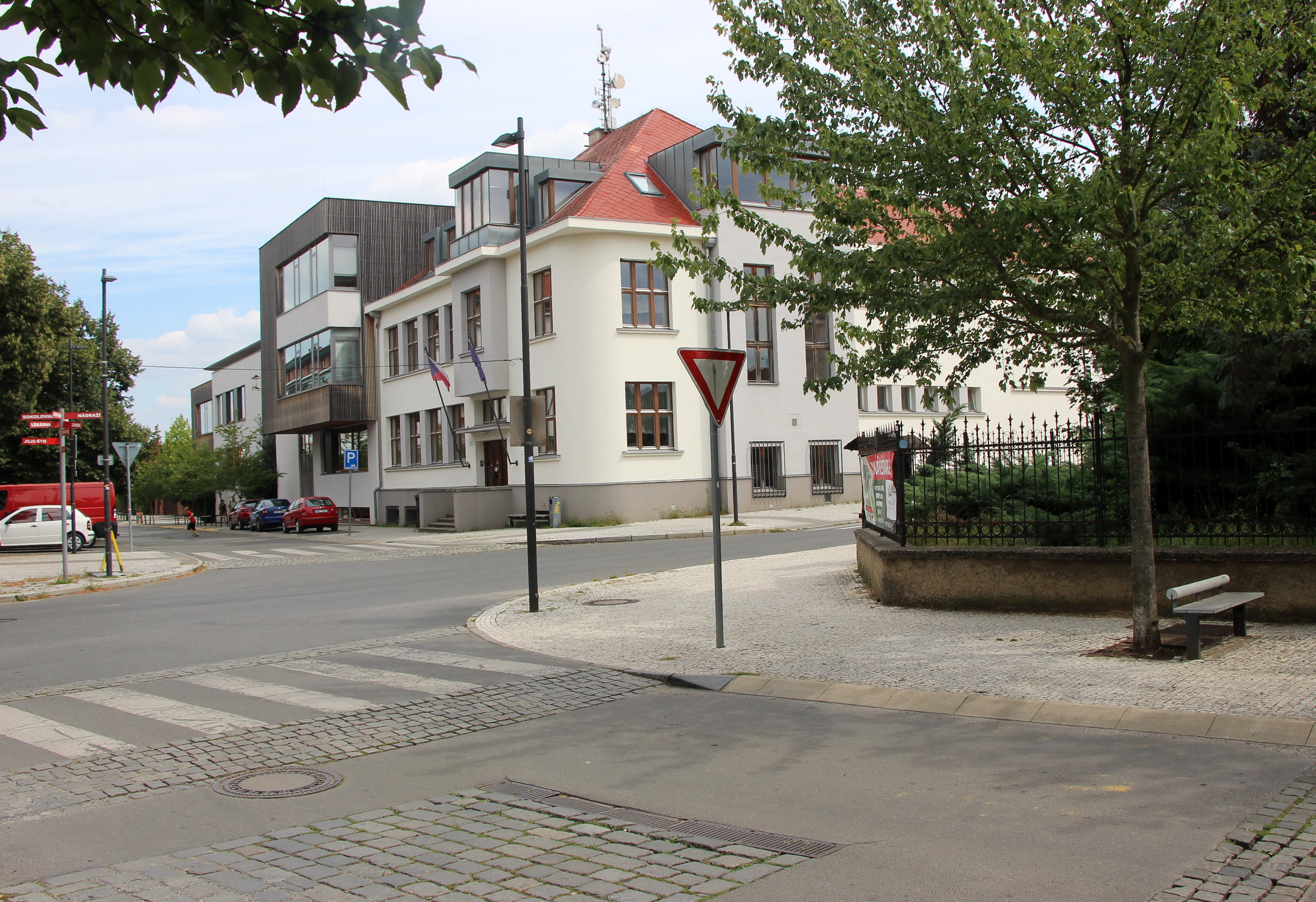
Primary school

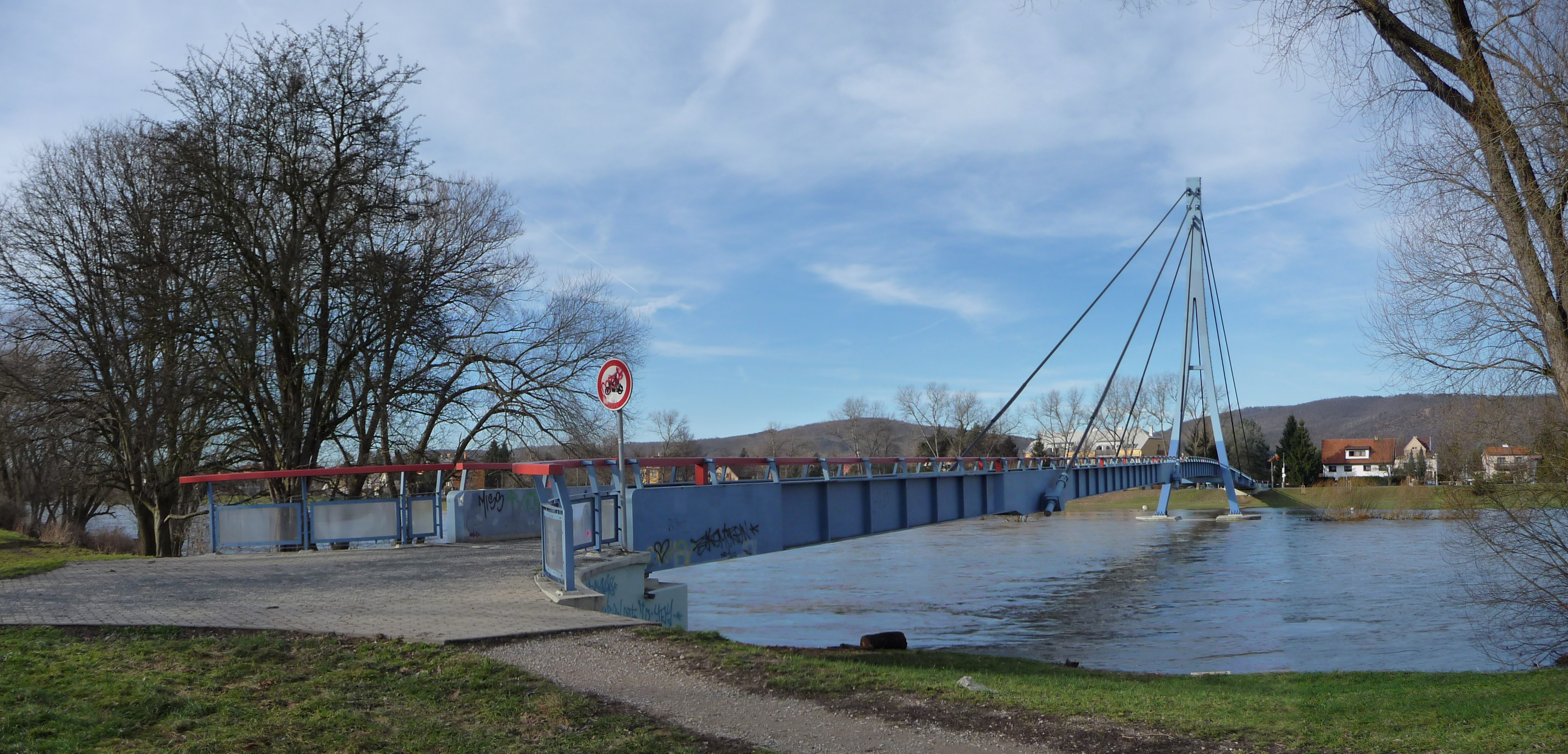
Prof. Karel Lewit's Footbridge over the Berounka

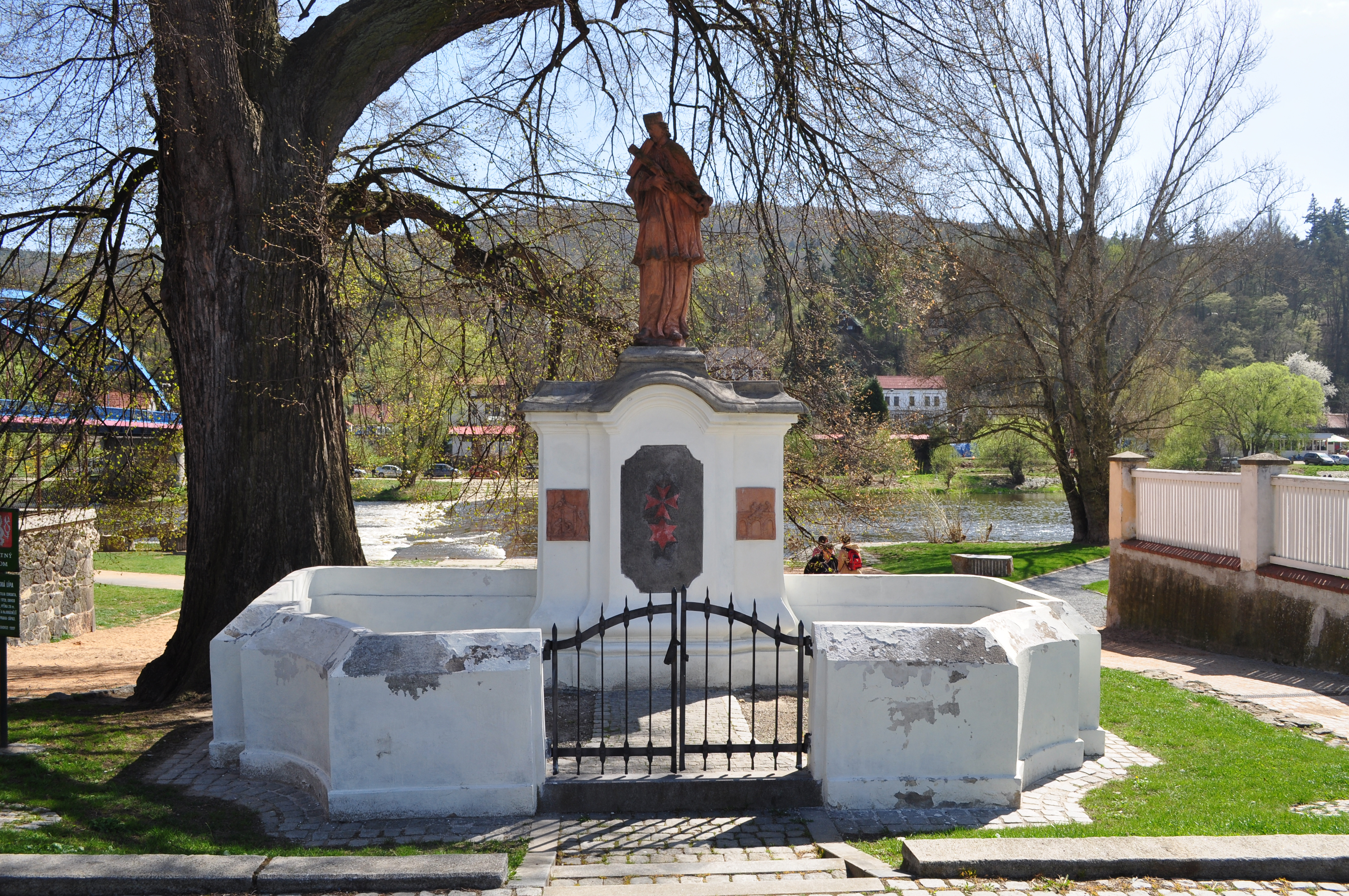
Statue of St. John of Nepomuk at the castle

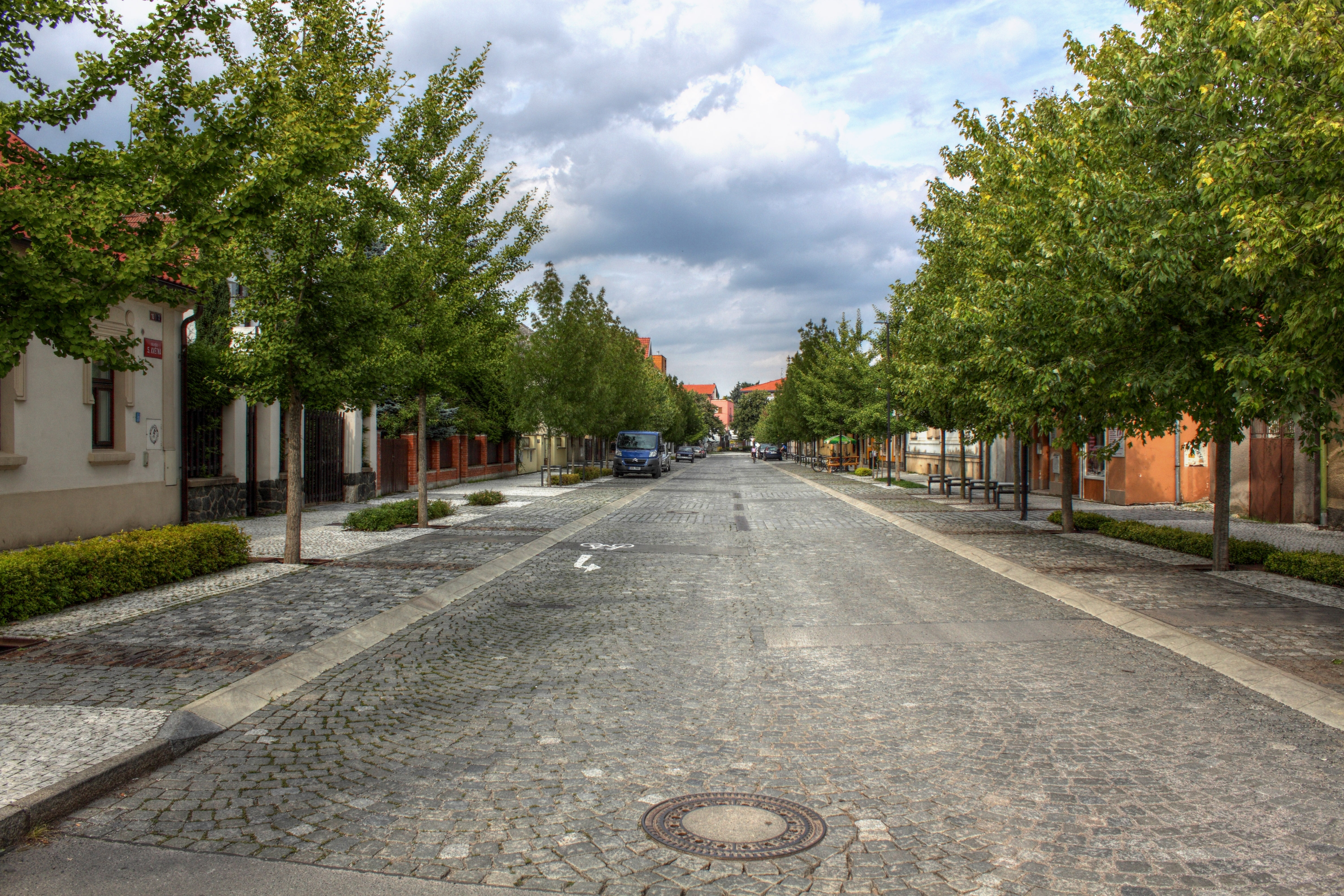
5. května Street

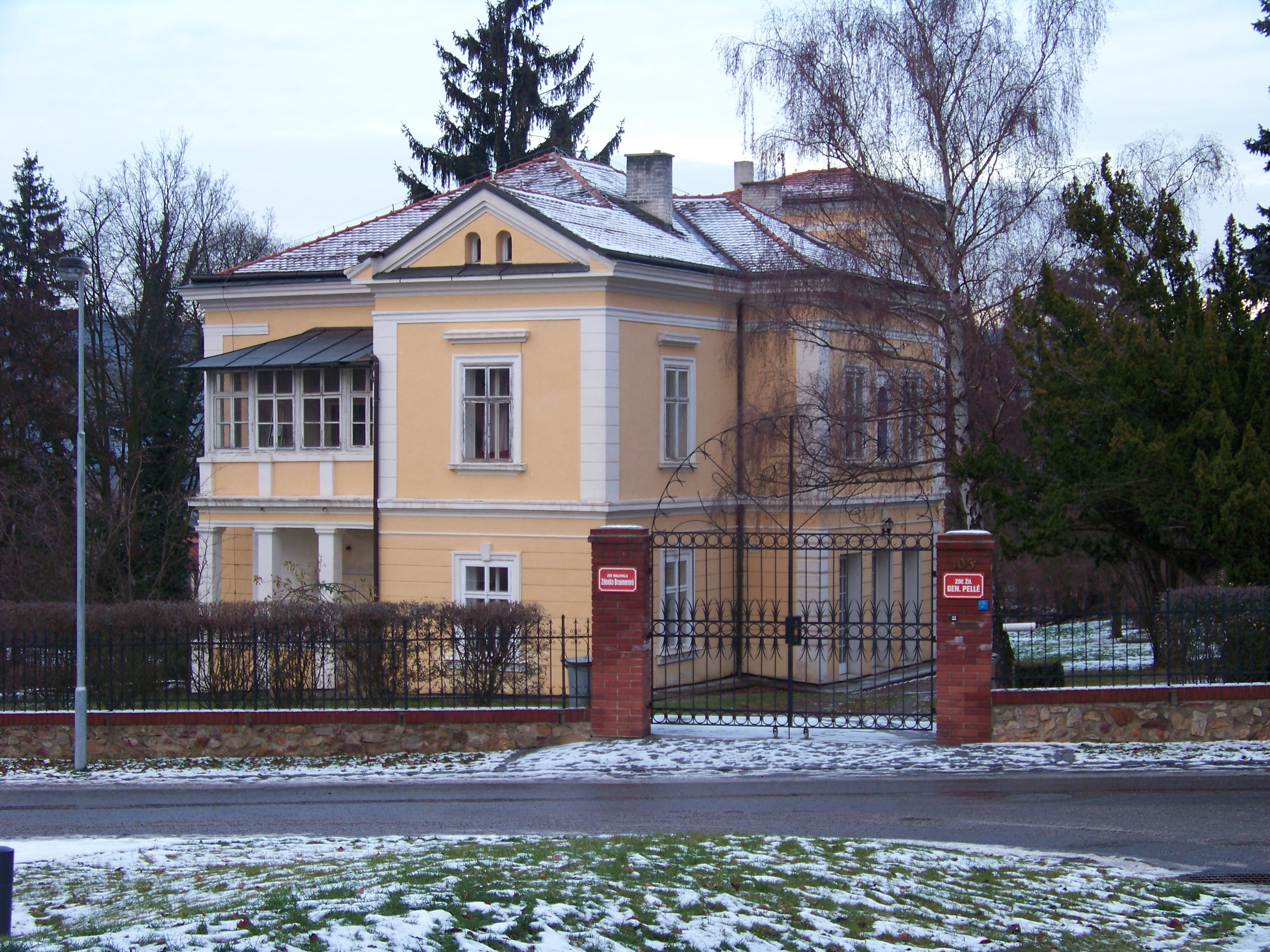
Villa No. 105 (Villa Pellé)
