= Arne Jansson =

Swedish canoeist

Medal record

Men's canoe sprint

World Championships
Silver medal – second place	1950 Copenhagen	K-4 10000 m
Bronze medal – third place	1950 Copenhagen	K-1 10000 m

Arne Jansson was a Swedish sprint canoeist who competed in the early 1950s. He won two medals at the 1950 ICF Canoe Sprint World Championships in Copenhagen with a silver in the K-4 10000 m and a bronze in the K-1 10000 m events.
