= René Fonck (canoeist) =

Luxembourgish sprint canoer

René Fonck (17 February 1923 – 26 February 2018) was a Luxembourgish sprint canoeist who competed in the late 1940s. He was born in Luxembourg City. At the 1948 Summer Olympics in London, he finished 15th in the K-2 10000 m event while being eliminated in the heats of the K-2 1000 m event. In 2008 he was promoted to the rank of Chevalier in the Order of Merit of the Grand Duchy of Luxembourg.
