= Alfred Corbiaux =

Belgian canoeist

Alfred Corbiaux (Namur, 16 August 1919 – 2005) was a Belgian canoe sprinter who competed in the late 1940s. He finished eighth in the K-1 10000 m event at the 1948 Summer Olympics in London.
