= Karl Andersson (sprint canoeist) =

Swedish canoeist

Medal record

Men's canoe sprint

World Championships
| Gold medal – first place | 1950 Copenhagen | K-4 10000 m |

Karl Andersson is a Swedish sprint canoeist who competed in the early 1950s. He won a gold medal in the K-4 10000 m event at the 1950 ICF Canoe Sprint World Championships in Copenhagen.
