= Julien Bogaert =

Belgian canoeist (1924–2018)

Julien Bogaert (18 August 1924 – 3 October 2018) was a Belgian sprint canoeist who competed in the late 1940s. He was eliminated in the heats in the K-1 1000 m event at the 1948 Summer Olympics in London.

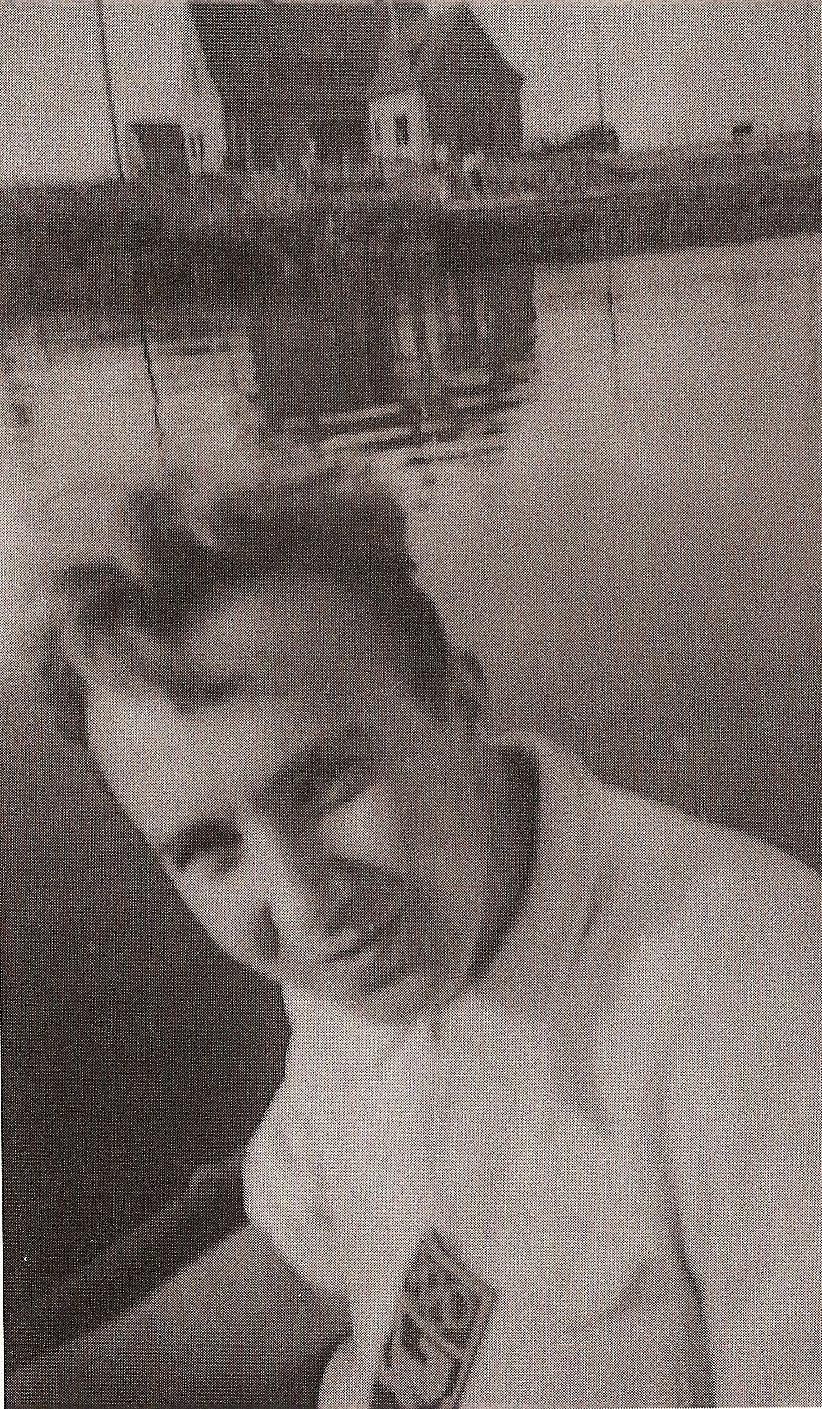
Julien Bogaert

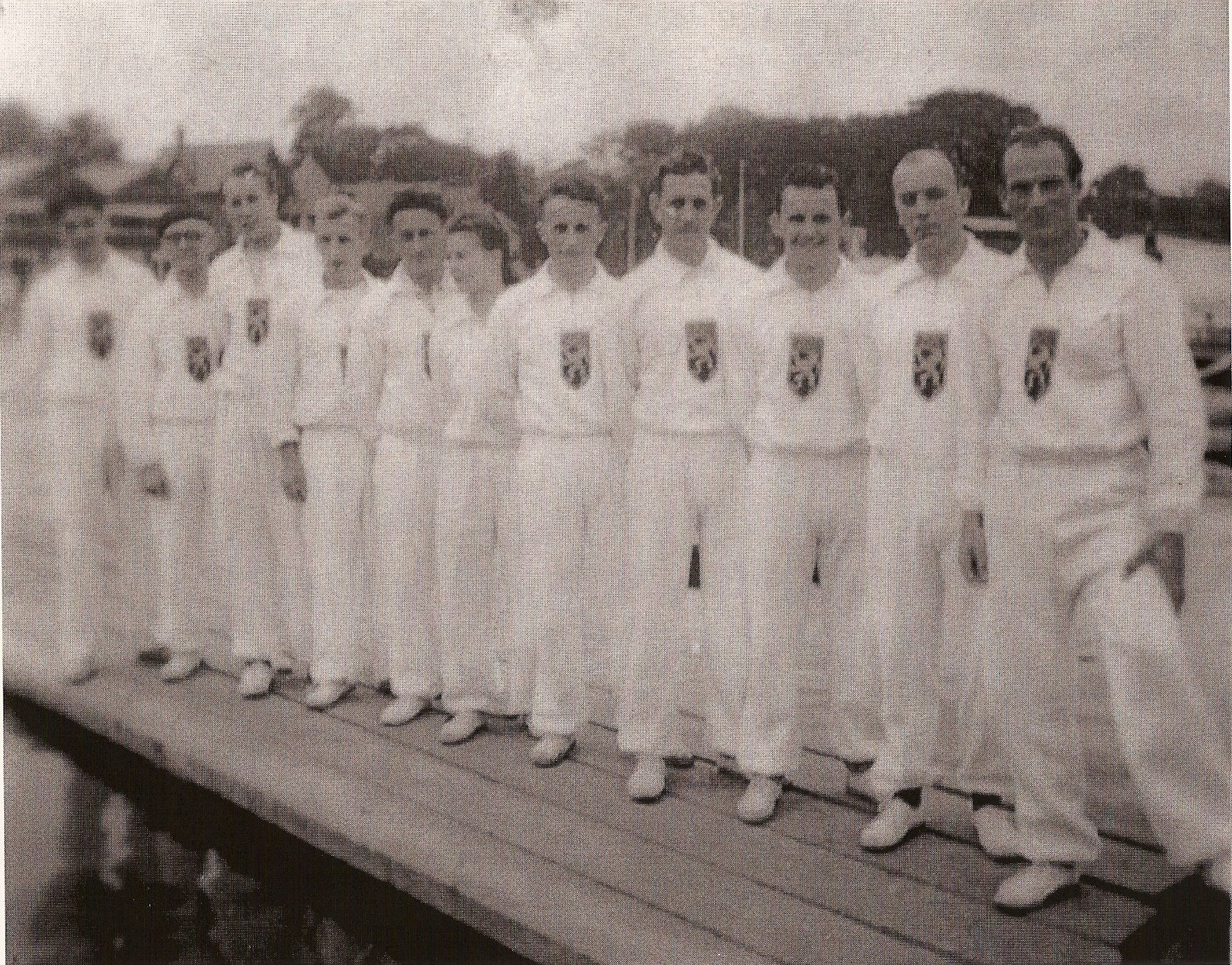
Julien Bogaert during the Summer Olympics in London.
