= Miloš Pech =

Czech canoeist

Medal record

Men's canoe sprint

World Championships
Silver medal – second place	1954 Mâcon	K-1 10000 m
Bronze medal – third place	1948 London	K-4 1000 m

Miloš Pech (born 22 August 1927 in Prague) is a Czech sprint canoeist who competed for Czechoslovakia from the late 1940s to the mid-1950s. He won two medals at the ICF Canoe Sprint World Championships with a silver (K-1 10000 m: 1954) and a bronze (K-4 1000 m: 1948). Pech also competed in two Summer Olympics, earning his best finish of fifth in the K-2 1000 m event at London in 1948. He was born in Prague.
