= Gerald Covey =

Canadian canoeist

Gerald Covey (2 November 1927 – 23 May 1986) was a Canadian sprint canoer who competed in the late 1940s. At the 1948 Summer Olympics in London, he finished seventh in the K-2 1000 m and 14th in the K-2 10000 m event. Covey died in Peterborough, Ontario May 1986.
