= Knud Ditlevsen =

Danish canoeist

Knud Ditlevsen (14 April 1925 – 3 October 2006) was a Danish sprint canoeist who competed in the late 1940s. He finished fourth in the K-1 10000 m event at the 1948 Summer Olympics in London.
