= Jack Henderson (canoeist) =

British sprint canoeist (1914–2000)

Personal information
- Born: John Lewis Henderson; 24 May 1914
- Died: 2000 (aged 85–86)
- Occupation: Canoer

Sport
- Country: Great Britain
- Sport: Men's Canoe
- Team: GB Canoeing Team
- Retired: 2000

John Lewis Henderson (24 May 1914 – 2000) was a British sprint canoeist who competed in the late 1940s. At the 1948 Summer Olympics in London, he was eliminated in the heats of the K-2 1000 m event. He was the author of Kayak to Cape Wrath, published in 1951 by William McLellan, which details the series of summer trips he took with friends over several years during which he journeyed by folding canoe, starting at Fort William and ending at Cape Wrath.
