= Lisa Lundberg =

Swedish sprint canoer

Medal record

Women's canoe sprint

World Championships
Bronze medal – third place	1950 Copenhagen	K-2 500 m

Lisa Lundberg is a Swedish sprint canoer who competed in the early 1950s. She won a bronze medal in the K-2 500 m event at the 1950 ICF Canoe Sprint World Championships in Copenhagen. In 1946, she won the best athlete award in the Borlänge Idrottsallians municipality, nominated by the Borlänge Canoe Club.
