= Kálmán Blahó =

Hungarian canoeist

Kálmán Blahó (3 April 1920 – 24 September 1966) was a Hungarian sprint canoer who competed in the late 1940s. He competed in the K-2 1000 m event at the 1948 Summer Olympics in London, but was disqualified for "hanging" in the wake of another canoe.
