= Frans Van den Berghen =

Belgian sprint canoer (1919–2003)

Frans Bernard Joanna "René" Van Den Berghen (25 September 1919 – 6 June 2003) was a Belgian canoe sprinter who competed in the late 1940s and early 1950s. Competing in two Summer Olympics, he was eliminated in the heats of the K-2 1000 m event at both the 1948 and 1952 Summer Olympics. He was born in Mechelen.
