= Claire Vautrin =

French canoeist

Claire Vautrin (nee Duranton) (1 April 1917 – 21 June 1995) was a French sprint canoeist who competed in the late 1940s. She finished eighth in the K-1 500 m event at the 1948 Summer Olympics in London. She was born in Paris, France and died in Bergerac, France.
