= Johan Andersen (canoeist) =

Danish canoeist (1920–2003)

Medal record

Men's canoe sprint

Olympic Games
Silver medal – second place	1948 London	K-1 1000 m

World Championships
Gold medal – first place	1950 Copenhagen	K-1 500 m
Silver medal – second place	1950 Copenhagen	K-1 4 x 500 m
Bronze medal – third place	1948 London	K-1 4 x 500 m

Johan Frederik Kobberup Andersen (24 January 1920] – 7 May 2003 in Struer) was a Danish sprint canoeist from Aarhus who competed in the late 1940s and early 1950s. He won a silver medal in the K-1 1000 m event at the 1948 Summer Olympics in London.

Andersen also won a complete set of medals at the ICF Canoe Sprint World Championships with a gold (K-1 500 m: 1950), a silver (K-1 4 x 500 m: 1950), and a bronze (K-1 4 x 500 m: 1948).

At club level he roved in Struer Kajakklub. His kayaks were typically built by his brother, Svend.
