= Thor Axelsson =

Finnish canoeist (1921–2012)

Medal record

Men's canoe sprint

Olympic Games
Bronze medal – third place	1948 London	K-2 1000 m
Bronze medal – third place	1948 London	K-2 10000 m

World Championships
Gold medal – first place	1948 London	K-2 500 m

Ture Wilhelm "Thor" Axelsson (3 July 1921 – 2 August 2012) was a Finnish sprint canoer who competed in the late 1940s. He won two bronze medals at the 1948 Summer Olympics in London, earning them in the K-2 1000 m and K-2 10000 m events. He was born in Helsinki. Axelsson also won a gold medal in the K-2 500 m event at the 1948 ICF Canoe Sprint World Championships in London. Note that the K-2 500 m event did not become an official event at the Summer Olympics until the 1976 Games in Montreal. The event has been on the Olympic program since then.
