= Nils Björklöf =

Finnish canoeist (1921–1987)

Medal record

Men's canoe sprint

Olympic Games
| Bronze medal – third place | 1948 London | K-2 1000 m |
| Bronze medal – third place | 1948 London | K-2 10000 m |

World Championships
| Gold medal – first place | 1948 London | K-2 500 m |

Nils Björklöf (13 April 1921, Ingå – 16 September 1987) was a Finnish sprint canoeist who competed in the late 1940s. He won two bronze medals at the 1948 Summer Olympics in London, earning them in the K-2 1000 m and K-2 10000 m events.

Björklöf also won a gold medal in the K-2 500 m event at the 1948 ICF Canoe Sprint World Championships in London.

Though born in Finland, Björklöf died in Stockholm, Sweden.

Note that the K-2 500 m event did not become an official event at the Summer Olympics until the 1976 Games in Montreal. The event has been on the Olympic program since then.
