= Henry Pettersson =

Swedish canoeist

Medal record

Men's canoe sprint

World Championships
Silver medal – second place	1950 Copenhagen	K-2 500 m

Henry Pettersson (11 May 1919 – 25 January 2016) was a Swedish sprint canoer who competed in the late 1940s and early 1950s. He won a silver medal in the K-2 500 m event at the 1950 ICF Canoe Sprint World Championships in Copenhagen.
