= John Eiseman =

American canoeist

John Eiseman (October 13, 1925 – April 26, 2016) was an American sprint canoer who competed in the late 1940s and early 1950s. Competing in two Summer Olympics, he earned his best finish of 13th in the K-2 10000 m event at London in 1948. He was born in Philadelphia.
