= Anna Van Marcke =

Belgian sprint canoeist (1924–2012)

Anna Van Marcke (18 April 1924 – June 2012) was a Belgian sprint canoeist who competed in the late 1940s. She finished seventh in the K-1 500 m event at the 1948 Summer Olympics in London. Born in Kortrijk on 18 April 1924, Van Marcke died in Vilvoorde in June 2012, at the age of 88.

== Sources ==
- Anna Van Marcke's profile at Sports Reference.com
