= Ejvind Hansen =

Medal record

Men's canoe sprint

Olympic Games
Silver medal – second place	1948 London	K-2 1000 m

World Championships
Silver medal – second place	1950 Copenhagen	K-1 4 x 500 m
Bronze medal – third place	1948 London	K-1 4 x 500 m
Bronze medal – third place	1948 London	K-2 500 m

Ejvind Hansen (July 28, 1924 in Fodslette, Langeland, Denmark – December 19, 1996) was a Danish sprint canoeist who competed in the late 1940s and the early 1950s. Competing in two Summer Olympics, he won a silver medal in the K-2 1000 m event at London in 1948 together with Jakob Bernhard Christian Jensen. In the final they did have the lead for the final, but ultimately lost to the Swedish Kajak.

Hansen also won three medals at the ICF Canoe Sprint World Championships with a silver (K-1 4 x 500 m: 1950) and two bronzes (K-1 4 x 500 m and K-2 500 m: both 1948).
