= Karen Hoff =

Danish canoeist

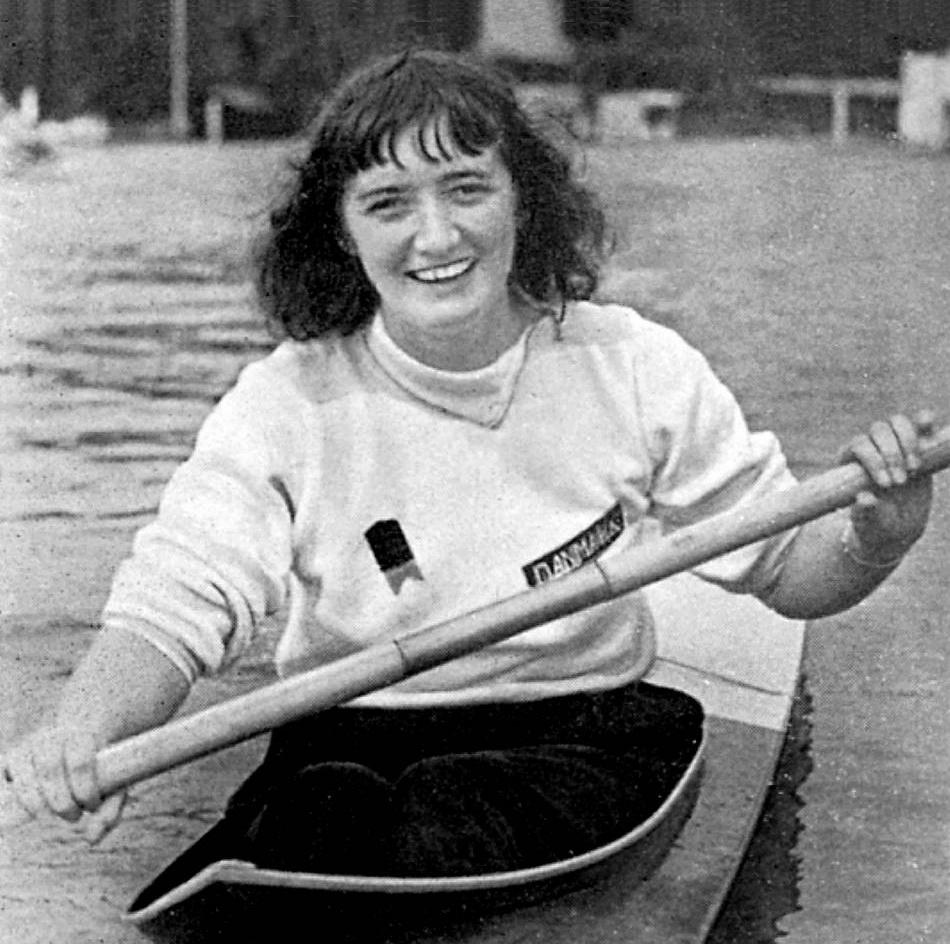
- Karen Hoff at the 1948 Olympics

Personal information
- Born: 29 May 1921 Vorup, Denmark
- Died: 29 February 2000 (aged 78)

Sport
- Sport: Canoe racing
- Club: Kano- og Kajakklubben Gudenaa, Randers
Medal record
Representing Denmark
Olympic Games
Gold medal – first place	1948 London	K-1 500 m
World Championships
Gold medal – first place	1948 London	K-2 500 m
Silver medal – second place	1950 Copenhagen	K-1 500 m

Karen Hoff (29 May 1921 – 29 February 2000) was a Danish sprint canoeist who competed in the late 1940s and early 1950s. She became the first female Olympic champion in the sport of canoeing when she won the gold medal in the K-1 500 m event at the 1948 Summer Olympics. Karen also won two medals at the ICF Canoe Sprint World Championships with a gold in K-2 500 m in 1948 and a silver in K-1 500 m in 1950.
