= Lennart Klingström =

Swedish canoeist (1916–1994)

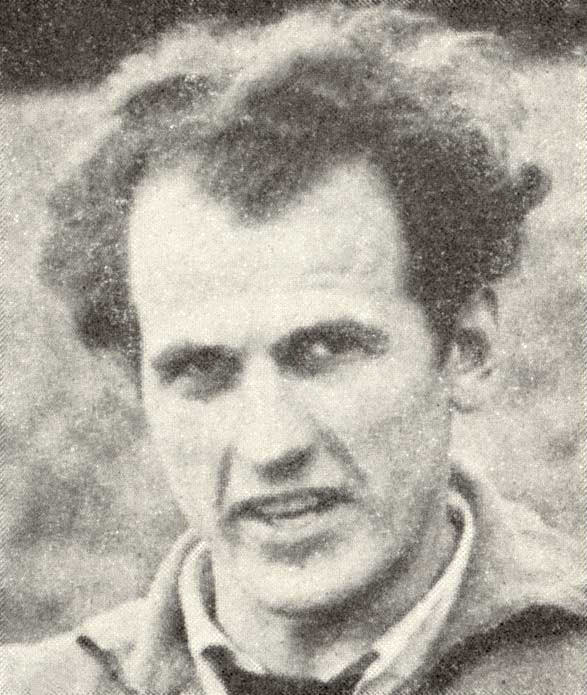

Personal information
- Full name: Lennart Klas Valdemar Klingström
- Born: 18 April 1916 Österåker, Stockholm, Sweden
- Died: 5 July 1994 (aged 78) Danderyd, Stockholm, Sweden

Sport
- Sport: Canoe racing
- Club: Brunnsvikens Kanotklubb, Stockholm
Medal record
Representing Sweden
Olympic Games
Gold medal – first place	1948 London	K-2 1000 m
World Championships
Gold medal – first place	1948 London	K-1 4×500 m
Gold medal – first place	1948 London	K-4 1000 m
Gold medal – first place	1950 Copenhagen	K-1 4×500 m
Silver medal – second place	1950 Copenhagen	K-1 500 m

Lennart Klas Valdemar Klingström (18 April 1916 – 5 July 1994) was a Swedish sprint canoeist who competed in the late 1940s and early 1950s. He won the gold in the K-2 1000 m event at the 1948 Summer Olympics in London.

Klingström also won four medals at the ICF Canoe Sprint World Championships with three golds (K-1 4×500 m: 1948, 1950; K-4 1000 m: 1948) and a silver (K-1 500 m: 1950).
