= Greta Grönholm =

Finnish canoeist

Medal record

Women's canoe sprint

World Championships
Gold medal – first place	1950 Copenhagen	K-2 500 m

Greta Alexandra Grönholm (8 June 1923 – 12 June 2015) was a Finnish sprint canoer who competed in the early 1950s. She won a gold medal in the K-2 500 m event at the 1950 ICF Canoe Sprint World Championships in Copenhagen. Grönholm was born in Ekenäs in June 1923 and died in June 2015 at the age of 92.
