= Albert Van de Vliet =

Belgian sprint canoer

Albert Van de Vliet (15 July 1917 – 30 March 2007) was a Belgian canoe sprinter who competed in the late 1940s and early 1950s. Competing in two Summer Olympics, he was eliminated in the heats of the K-2 1000 m event at both 1948 and 1952. He was born in Westerlo.
