= Bernhard Jensen =

Danish flatwater canoeist

Medal record

Men's canoe sprint

Olympic Games
Silver medal – second place	1948 London	K-2 1000 m

World Championships
Bronze medal – third place	1948 London	K-1 4 x 500 m
Bronze medal – third place	1948 London	K-2 500 m

Jakob Bernhard Christian Jensen (February 16, 1912 in Odense, Denmark – June 17, 1997) was a Danish flatwater canoeist who competed in the late 1940s. He won a silver in the K-2 1000 m event at the 1948 Summer Olympics in London together with Ejvind Hansen. In the final they did have the lead for the final, but ultimately lost to the Swedish Kajak.

Jensen also won two bronze medals at the 1948 ICF Canoe Sprint World Championships in London, earning them in the K-1 4 x 500 m and the K-2 500 m events.
