= Eric Ortner =

Eric Ortner is a producer and talent manager at The Ortner Group and is the principal partner of Vector OMG, a division of Live Nation Entertainment. He is a board member for The Global Poverty Project. In 2015, he was appointed to the President's Committee on the Arts and the Humanities. He was a senior producer for ABC News 20/20, Primetime, and non-fiction programming. He was also senior producer of ABC Television Network's Six Degrees of Martina McBride.

In December 2005, he departed NBC News Today show, where he first began in high school, and was named Senior Producer of ABC's Good Morning America. In 2006, when broadcasting and cable covered new technology, Ortner integrated into Good Morning America.

Prior to joining ABC, Eric Ortner worked in the position of senior tape producer for NBC News Weekend Today and also as producer in charge of consumer and investigative stories for NBC News Today.

In September 2001, Eric Ortner was profiled by Bob Dotson on Today and in a PoynterOnline article chronicling Ortner's experiences as a volunteer EMS during and following the September 11 attacks.

In September 2009, Ortner admiringly referred to Diane Sawyer as a "Super Nova" in The New York Times.

On September 30, 2009, Ortner announced with his company Eric Ortner Productions a production partnership with Flavor Flav and ISH Entertainment to produce an unscripted show with the working title: "Flavor Flav Goes Back to High School". . Additionally, on April 12, 2010, an announcement revealed that Eric Ortner Productions acquired the rights to produce and develop the Golden Raspberry Awards Awards, commonly called the Razzies. Ortner and Eric Ortner Productions will produce future awards telecasts, along with Razzie branded television shows and other entertainment properties.

Ortner helped with the Obama re-election campaign in 2012 and was seen at the DNC and presidential debates. He co-chairs the Entertainment Advisory Council to the White House Office of Public Engagement and was instrumental in celebrity outreach for the 2013-2014 Affordable Care Act enrollment activities.
