= Hans Martin Gulbrandsen =

Norwegian canoeist (1914–1979)

Medal record

Men's canoe sprint

World Championships
Silver medal – second place	1948 London	K-1 4 x 500 m

Hans Martin Gulbrandsen (31 January 1914 – 4 February 1979) was a Norwegian sprint canoeist. He competed at the 1948 Summer Olympics in London where he finished 4th in the K-1 1000 m event, and at the 1952 Summer Olympics in Helsinki, where he finished 5th in K-1 10000 m.

He received a silver medal in K-1 4 x 500 m at the 1948 ICF Canoe Sprint World Championships also held in London.
