= Růžena Košťálová =

Czechoslovak sprint canoeist (1924–2024)

Medal record

Representing Czechoslovakia

Women's canoe sprint

World Championships
Silver medal – second place	1948 London	K-2 500 m

Růžena Košťálová (21 February 1924 – 12 April 2024) was a Czechoslovak sprint canoeist who competed in the late 1940s. She won a silver medal in the K-2 500 m event at the 1948 ICF Canoe Sprint World Championships in London. She turned 100 on 21 February 2024, and died on 12 April.

== Sources ==
- Růžena Košťálová's profile at Sports Reference.com
