= Robert Boutigny =

French sprint canoeist (1927–2022)

Medal record

Men's canoe sprint

Olympic Games
Bronze medal – third place	1948 London	C-1 1000 m

World Championships
Gold medal – first place	1950 Copenhagen	C-1 10000 m
Silver medal – second place	1950 Copenhagen	C-1 1000 m

Robert Boutigny (24 July 1927 – 22 July 2022) was a French sprint canoeist who competed from the late 1940s to the early 1950s. Competing in two Summer Olympics, he won a bronze medal in the C-1 1000 m event at London in 1948. Boutigny also won two medals at the 1950 ICF Canoe Sprint World Championships with a gold in the C-1 10000 m and a silver in the C-1 1000 m events.
