= Fritzi Schwingl =

Austrian canoeist (1921–2016)

Medal record

Representing Austria

Women's canoe sprint

Olympic Games
Bronze medal – third place	1948 London	K-1 500 m

Canoe Sprint World Championships
Silver medal – second place	1950 Copenhagen	K-2 500 m
Silver medal – second place	1954 Mâcon	K-1 500 m
Bronze medal – third place	1948 London	K-2 500 m
Bronze medal – third place	1950 Copenhagen	K-1 500 m

Women's canoe slalom

Canoe Slalom World Championships
Gold medal – first place	1949 Geneva	Folding K-1 team
Gold medal – first place	1951 Steyr	Folding K-1 team
Gold medal – first place	1953 Meran	Folding K-1
Silver medal – second place	1949 Geneva	Folding K-1
Silver medal – second place	1951 Steyr	Folding K-1
Bronze medal – third place	1953 Meran	Folding K-1 team
Bronze medal – third place	1957 Augsburg	Folding K-1 team

Friederike "Fritzi" Schwingl (28 July 1921 – 9 July 2016) was an Austrian slalom and sprint canoeist who competed from the late 1940s to the late 1950s. She won a bronze medal in the K-1 500 m event at the 1948 Summer Olympics in London.

== Biography ==
Schwingl won four medals at the ICF Canoe Sprint World Championships with two silvers (K-1 500 m: 1954, K-2 500 m: 1950) and two bronzes (K-1 500 m: 1950, K-2 500 m: 1948). She also won seven medals at the ICF Canoe Slalom World Championships with three golds (Folding K-1: 1953; Folding K-1 team: 1949, 1951), two silvers (Folding K-1: 1949, 1951) and two bronzes (Folding K-1 team: 1953, 1957). As of 2009, Schwingl was the only woman to medal at both the slalom and sprint canoeing world championships.
