= Henri Eberhardt =

French canoeist (1913–1976)

Olympic medal record

Men's canoe sprint
Silver medal – second place	1936 Berlin	Folding K-1 10000 m
Bronze medal – third place	1948 London	K-1 1000 m

Martin Henri Eberhardt (27 November 1913 – 4 July 1976) was a French sprint canoeist who competed from the late 1930s to the late 1940s. Competing in two Summer Olympics, he won two medals with a silver (1936: Folding K-1 10000 m) and a bronze (1948: K-1 1000 m).

Eberhardt was born in Riedisheim on 27 November 1913. He died in Beaune on 4 July 1976, at the age of 62.
