= Knut Østby =

Norwegian canoe racer

Personal information
- Nationality: Norwegian
- Born: 12 November 1922 Modum
- Died: 6 August 2010 (aged 87)

Sport
- Sport: Canoeing
Medal record
Men's canoe sprint
Olympic Games
| Silver medal – second place | 1948 London | K-2 10000 m |
World Championships
| Silver medal – second place | 1950 Copenhagen | K-2 1000 m |

Knut Østby (12 November 1922 – 6 August 2010) was a Norwegian sprint canoeist who competed from the late 1940s to the late 1950s. Participating in three Summer Olympics, he won a silver medal in the K-2 10000 m event at London in 1948 and another in the K-2 1000 m event at the 1950 World Championships.

== Career ==
Østby was born in Modum, but grew up in Bærum, and was a member of Bærum KK. He was a new name in Norwegian and international kayaking after 1945, as most of the pre-war organized sporting activity had been put on ice during World War II. Already in 1948, before the Summer Olympics that year, Østby and his teammate Ivar Mathisen were considered as having the highest medal hopes in the Norwegian canoeing squad. Østby and Mathisen proceeded to win the silver medal in the K-2 10000 m event and finished fourth in the K-2 1000 m. At the 1950 World Championships he won another silver medal in the K-2 1000 m event. Two years later he finished fifth in both the K-2 1000 m and the K-2 10000 m events at the 1952 Summer Olympics. Ivar Mathisen remained his partner in the K-2 canoe during these years.

In 1953 Østby competed in the Canoe Slalom World Championships in Meran, Italy. He was considered as being without any sporting hopes for the competition, having no prior experience with whitewater kayaking—the newspaper Verdens Gang quoted him as saying "I don't even know what kind of boat to use". The participation was essentially regarded as a test to see whether slalom kayaking should be taken up in Norway—where it was largely unknown, despite the country's abundance of whitewater locations. Østby was the only competitor from Norway, but the vice chairman of the Norwegian Canoe Association traveled with him to help evaluate the championship. The stay and the travel to Italy were paid for in full by the Italian arrangement committee. As it turned out, whitewater kayaking did not reach Norway until the 1960s and was not organized within the Norwegian Canoe Association until 1972.

Østby continued his career in sprint canoeing. At the 1956 Summer Olympics he finished eighth in the K-1 10000 m event, and competed without reaching the final in the K-1 1000 m event. In domestic competitions, he took fifteen national titles between 1946 and 1959, and won the King's Cup for best canoeist in 1955, 1956 and 1957.

Østby lived in Sandvika. He died in August 2010.
