= Hans Wetterström =

Swedish canoeist (1923–1980)

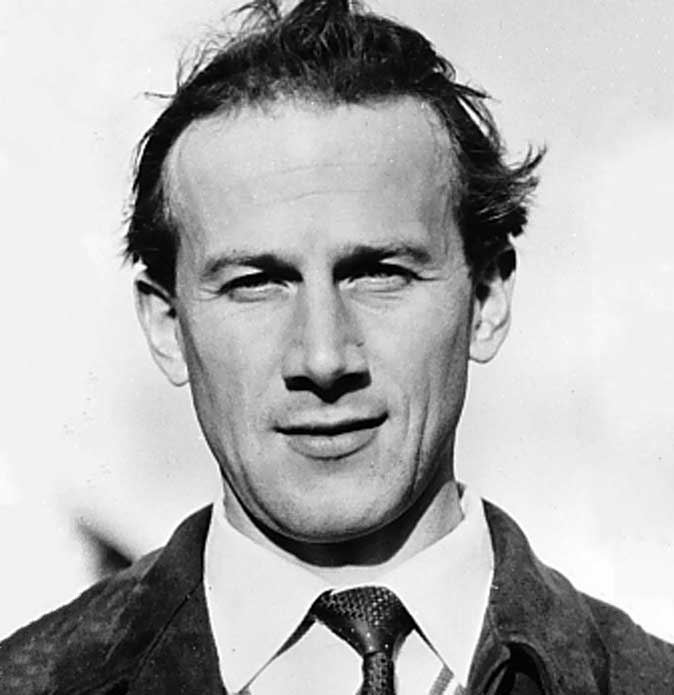

Personal information
- Born: 11 December 1923 Nyköping, Sweden
- Died: 17 November 1980 (aged 56) Nyköping, Sweden

Sport
- Sport: Canoe sprint
- Club: Nyköpings Kanotklubb
Medal record
Men's canoe sprint
Representing Sweden
Olympic Games
Gold medal – first place	1948 London	K-2 10000 m
Silver medal – second place	1952 Helsinki	K-2 10000 m
World Championships
Gold medal – first place	1948 London	K-4 1000 m
Gold medal – first place	1950 Copenhagen	K-2 10000 m
Silver medal – second place	1950 Copenhagen	K-4 1000 m
Silver medal – second place	1954 Mâcon	K-4 10000 m

Hans Wetterström (11 December 1923 – 17 November 1980) was a Swedish canoe sprinter. He competed in the 10,000 m doubles event at the 1948, 1952 and 1956 Olympics and finished in first, second and fourth place, respectively.

Wetterström also won four medals at the ICF Canoe Sprint World Championships with two golds (K-2 10000 m: 1950, K-4 1000 m: 1948) and two silvers (K-4 1000 m: 1950, K-4 10000 m: 1954).
