= Piet Bakker (canoeist) =

Dutch sprint canoeist

Medal record

Men's canoe sprint

World Championships
Bronze medal – third place	1950 Copenhagen	K-2 1000 m

Piet Bakker is a Dutch sprint canoeist who competed in the late 1940s and early 1950s. He won a bronze medal in the K-2 1000 m event at the 1950 ICF Canoe Sprint World Championships in Copenhagen.
