= Eivind Skabo =

Norwegian canoeist

Medal record

Men's canoe sprint

Olympic Games
Bronze medal – third place	1948 London	K-1 10000 m

World Championships
Silver medal – second place	1948 London	K-1 4 x 500 m

Eivind Skabo (August 17, 1916 – April 18, 2006) was a Norwegian sprint canoeist who competed in the late 1940s. He won a bronze medal in the K-1 10000 m event at the 1948 Summer Olympics in London.

Skabio also won a silver medal in K-1 4 x 500 m at the 1948 ICF Canoe Sprint World Championships, also in London.
