= Canoeing at the 1984 Summer Olympics =

At the 1984 Summer Olympics in Los Angeles, twelve events in sprint canoe racing were contested on Lake Casitas. The women's K-4 500 m event was introduced to the Olympic program at these Games.

== Medal table ==
Rank	Nation	Gold	Silver	Bronze	Total
1	New Zealand	4	0	0	4
2	Sweden	2	4	0	6
3	Canada	2	2	2	6
4	Romania	2	1	1	4
5	Yugoslavia	1	2	0	3
6	West Germany	1	1	1	3
7	France	0	1	3	4
8	Denmark	0	1	1	2
9	Australia	0	0	1	1
9	Netherlands	0	0	1	1
9	Spain	0	0	1	1
9	United States	0	0	1	1
Totals (12 entries)		12	12	12	36

== Medal summary ==
=== Men's events ===
Games	Gold	Silver	Bronze
C-1 500 metres	Larry Cain; Canada	Henning Lynge Jakobsen; Denmark	Costică Olaru; Romania
C-1 1000 metres	Ulrich Eicke; West Germany	Larry Cain; Canada	Henning Lynge Jakobsen; Denmark
C-2 500 metres	Matija Ljubek and Mirko Nišović (YUG)	Ivan Patzaichin and Toma Simionov (ROU)	Enrique Míguez and Narcisco Suárez (ESP)
C-2 1000 metres	Ivan Patzaichin and Toma Simionov (ROU)	Matija Ljubek and Mirko Nišović (YUG)	Didier Hoyer and Eric Renaud (FRA)
K-1 500 metres	Ian Ferguson; New Zealand	Lars-Erik Moberg; Sweden	Bernard Brégeon; France
K-1 1000 metres	Alan Thompson; New Zealand	Milan Janić; Yugoslavia	Greg Barton; United States
K-2 500 metres	Ian Ferguson and Paul MacDonald (NZL)	Per-Inge Bengtsson and Lars-Erik Moberg (SWE)	Hugh Fisher and Alwyn Morris (CAN)
K-2 1000 metres	Hugh Fisher and Alwyn Morris (CAN)	Bernard Brégeon and Patrick Lefoulon (FRA)	Barry Kelly and Grant Kenny (AUS)
K-4 1000 metres	New Zealand; Grant Bramwell; Ian Ferguson; Paul MacDonald; Alan Thompson	Sweden; Per-Inge Bengtsson; Tommy Karls; Lars-Erik Moberg; Thomas Ohlsson	France; François Barouh; Philippe Boccara; Pascal Boucherit; Didier Vavasseur

=== Women's events ===
Games	Gold	Silver	Bronze
K-1 500 metres	Agneta Andersson; Sweden	Barbara Schüttpelz; West Germany	Annemiek Derckx; Netherlands
K-2 500 metres	Agneta Andersson and Anna Olsson (SWE)	Alexandra Barre and Susan Holloway (CAN)	Josefa Idem and Barbara Schüttpelz (FRG)
K-4 500 metres	Romania; Agafia Constantin; Nastasia Ionescu; Tecla Marinescu; Maria Ştefan	Sweden; Agneta Andersson; Anna Olsson; Eva Karlsson; Susanne Wiberg	Canada; Alexandra Barre; Lucie Guay; Susan Holloway; Barbara Olmsted

== See also ==
- Canoeing at the Friendship Games
