= List of Olympic medallists for New Zealand =

New Zealand at the Olympics
- IOC code: NZL
- NOC: New Zealand Olympic Committee
- Website: www.olympic.org.nz
- Medals: Gold 65 Silver 44 Bronze 57 Total 166

Summer appearances
- 1908; 1912; 1920; 1924; 1928; 1932; 1936; 1948; 1952; 1956; 1960; 1964; 1968; 1972; 1976; 1980; 1984; 1988; 1992; 1996; 2000; 2004; 2008; 2012; 2016; 2020; 2024; 2028

Winter appearances
- 1952; 1956; 1960; 1964; 1968; 1972; 1976; 1980; 1984; 1988; 1992; 1994; 1998; 2002; 2006; 2010; 2014; 2018; 2022; 2026

Other related appearances
- Australasia (1908–1912)

New Zealand Olympic medallists' success for New Zealand at the Olympics is often considered to be notable due to the relatively small population of the country (5.32 million as of June 2025). Being located in the remote South Pacific, New Zealanders needed to endure long sea voyages to attend the early Olympics. It was not until the VII Olympiad in 1920 that New Zealand sent its first team. Prior to that, three New Zealanders won medals competing for Australasian teams in 1908 and 1912. On only two occasions since 1920 has New Zealand failed to win a medal at the Summer Olympics, in 1948 at London and in 1980 at Moscow, when only four competitors were sent as a result of the 1980 Summer Olympics boycott.

New Zealand has had a much smaller participation in the Winter Olympics, due to the country's temperate climate, not generally experiencing the severe winters to lowland levels, common in many countries in the Northern Hemisphere. The first New Zealand team to attend a Winter Olympics was in 1952. The nation has won medals at four Winter games, in 1992, 2018, 2022 and 2026.

The sporting rivalry between New Zealand and bigger neighbour Australia has been evident at many Olympic Games. In 1984, some Australian media outlets poked fun at the New Zealand gold medallists, saying they had been sitting down on the job at the Los Angeles Games, where they were successful in canoeing, equestrian, rowing and sailing. The New Zealand media pointed out that New Zealand had finished 8th on the final medals table, and Australia only 14th. New Zealand has finished higher than Australia on the medals table at the Summer Olympics only in 1976, when Australia failed to win a gold medal, and Los Angeles in 1984.

== Medallists ==
| # | Medal | Games | Name | Sport | Event | Date |
|---|---|---|---|---|---|---|
| 1 | Bronze | 1920 Antwerp | Darcy Hadfield | Rowing | Men's single sculls | 29 August 1920 |
| 2 | Bronze | 1924 Paris | Arthur Porritt | Athletics | Men's 100 metres | 7 July 1924 |
| 3 | Gold | 1928 Amsterdam | Ted Morgan | Boxing | Welterweight | 11 August 1928 |
| 4 | Silver | 1932 Los Angeles | Cyril Stiles; Rangi Thompson | Rowing | Men's coxless pair | 13 August 1932 |
| 5 | Gold | 1936 Berlin | Jack Lovelock | Athletics | Men's 1500 metres | 6 August 1936 |
| 6 | Bronze | 1952 Helsinki | John Holland | Athletics | Men's 400 metres hurdles | 21 July 1952 |
| 7 | Gold | 1952 Helsinki | Yvette Williams | Athletics | Women's long jump | 23 July 1952 |
| 8 | Bronze | 1952 Helsinki | Jean Stewart | Swimming | Women's 100 metre backstroke | 31 July 1952 |
| 9 | Gold | 1956 Melbourne | Norman Read | Athletics | Men's 50 kilometres walk | 24 November 1956 |
| 10 | Gold | 1956 Melbourne | Jack Cropp; Peter Mander | Sailing | 12m² Sharpie | 5 December 1956 |
| 11 | Gold | 1960 Rome | Peter Snell | Athletics | Men's 800 metres | 2 September 1960 |
| 12 | Gold | 1960 Rome | Murray Halberg | Athletics | Men's 5000 metres | 2 September 1960 |
| 13 | Bronze | 1960 Rome | Barry Magee | Athletics | Men's marathon | 10 September 1960 |
| 14 | Gold | 1964 Tokyo | Peter Snell | Athletics | Men's 800 metres | 16 October 1964 |
| 15 | Bronze | 1964 Tokyo | Marise Chamberlain | Athletics | Women's 800 metres | 20 October 1964 |
| 16 | Gold | 1964 Tokyo | Peter Snell | Athletics | Men's 1500 metres | 21 October 1964 |
| 17 | Bronze | 1964 Tokyo | John Davies | Athletics | Men's 1500 metres | 21 October 1964 |
| 18 | Gold | 1964 Tokyo | Helmer Pedersen; Earle Wells | Sailing | Flying Dutchman | 21 October 1964 |
| 19 | Gold | 1968 Mexico City | Warren Cole; Ross Collinge; Dick Joyce; Dudley Storey; Simon Dickie (cox) | Rowing | Men's coxed four | 19 October 1968 |
| 20 | Bronze | 1968 Mexico City | Ian Ballinger | Shooting | Mixed 50 metre rifle prone | 19 October 1968 |
| 21 | Bronze | 1968 Mexico City | Mike Ryan | Athletics | Men's marathon | 20 October 1968 |
| 22 | Silver | 1972 Munich | Ross Collinge; Noel Mills; Dudley Storey; Dick Tonks | Rowing | Men's coxless four | 2 September 1972 |
| 23 | Gold | 1972 Munich | Trevor Coker; Joe Earl; John Hunter; Tony Hurt; Dick Joyce; Gary Robertson; Wybo Veldman; Lindsay Wilson; Simon Dickie (cox) | Rowing | Men's eight | 2 September 1972 |
| 24 | Bronze | 1972 Munich | Rod Dixon | Athletics | Men's 1500 metres | 10 September 1972 |
| 25 | Bronze | 1976 Montreal | Trevor Coker; Peter Dignan; Joe Earl; Tony Hurt; Alec McLean; Dave Rodger; Ivan Sutherland; Lindsay Wilson; Simon Dickie (cox) | Rowing | Men's eight | 25 July 1976 |
| 26 | Gold | 1976 Montreal | New Zealand men's national team: Paul Ackerley; Jeff Archibald; Arthur Borren; Alan Chesney; John Christensen; Greg Dayman; Tony Ineson; Barry Maister; Selwyn Maister; Trevor Manning; Alan McIntyre; Arthur Parkin; Mohan Patel; Ramesh Patel | Hockey | Men's tournament | 30 July 1976 |
| 27 | Silver | 1976 Montreal | Dick Quax | Athletics | Men's 5000 metres | 30 July 1976 |
| 28 | Gold | 1976 Montreal | John Walker | Athletics | Men's 1500 metres | 31 July 1976 |
| 29 | Gold | 1984 Los Angeles | Mark Todd | Equestrian | Individual eventing | 3 August 1984 |
| 30 | Bronze | 1984 Los Angeles | Kevin Lawton; Barrie Mabbott; Don Symon; Ross Tong; Brett Hollister (cox) | Rowing | Men's coxed four | 5 August 1984 |
| 31 | Gold | 1984 Los Angeles | Shane O'Brien; Les O'Connell; Conrad Robertson; Keith Trask | Rowing | Men's coxless four | 5 August 1984 |
| 32 | Gold | 1984 Los Angeles | Rex Sellers; Chris Timms | Sailing | Tornado | 8 August 1984 |
| 33 | Gold | 1984 Los Angeles | Russell Coutts | Sailing | Finn | 8 August 1984 |
| 34 | Bronze | 1984 Los Angeles | Bruce Kendall | Sailing | Windglider | 8 August 1984 |
| 35 | Gold | 1984 Los Angeles | Ian Ferguson | Canoeing | Men's K-1 500 metres | 10 August 1984 |
| 36 | Gold | 1984 Los Angeles | Ian Ferguson; Paul MacDonald | Canoeing | Men's K-2 500 metres | 10 August 1984 |
| 37 | Silver | 1984 Los Angeles | Kevin Barry | Boxing | Light heavyweight | 11 August 1984 |
| 38 | Gold | 1984 Los Angeles | Alan Thompson | Canoeing | Men's K-1 1000 metres | 11 August 1984 |
| 39 | Gold | 1984 Los Angeles | Grant Bramwell; Ian Ferguson; Paul MacDonald; Alan Thompson | Canoeing | Men's K-4 1000 metres | 11 August 1984 |
| 40 | Bronze | 1988 Seoul | Andrew Bennie; Margaret Knighton; Tinks Pottinger; Mark Todd | Equestrian | Team eventing | 22 September 1988 |
| 41 | Gold | 1988 Seoul | Mark Todd | Equestrian | Individual eventing | 22 September 1988 |
| 42 | Bronze | 1988 Seoul | Paul Kingsman | Swimming | Men's 200 metre backstroke | 22 September 1988 |
| 43 | Bronze | 1988 Seoul | Lynley Hannen; Nikki Payne | Rowing | Women's coxless pair | 24 September 1988 |
| 44 | Bronze | 1988 Seoul | Greg Johnston; George Keys; Ian Wright; Chris White; Andrew Bird (cox) | Rowing | Men's coxed four | 24 September 1988 |
| 45 | Bronze | 1988 Seoul | Eric Verdonk | Rowing | Men's single sculls | 24 September 1988 |
| 46 | Bronze | 1988 Seoul | Anthony Mosse | Swimming | Men's 200 metre butterfly | 24 September 1988 |
| 47 | Bronze | 1988 Seoul | John Cutler | Sailing | Finn | 27 September 1988 |
| 48 | Silver | 1988 Seoul | Rex Sellers; Chris Timms | Sailing | Tornado | 27 September 1988 |
| 49 | Gold | 1988 Seoul | Bruce Kendall | Sailing | Men's Division II | 27 September 1988 |
| 50 | Bronze | 1988 Seoul | Paul MacDonald | Canoeing | Men's K-1 500 metres | 30 September 1988 |
| 51 | Gold | 1988 Seoul | Ian Ferguson; Paul MacDonald | Canoeing | Men's K-2 500 metres | 30 September 1988 |
| 52 | Silver | 1988 Seoul | Ian Ferguson; Paul MacDonald | Canoeing | Men's K-2 1000 metres | 1 October 1988 |
| 53 | Silver | 1992 Albertville | Annelise Coberger | Alpine skiing | Women's slalom | 20 February 1992 |
| 54 | Bronze | 1992 Barcelona | Gary Anderson | Cycling | Men's individual pursuit | 29 July 1992 |
| 55 | Silver | 1992 Barcelona | Vicky Latta; Andrew Nicholson; Blyth Tait | Equestrian | Team eventing | 30 July 1992 |
| 56 | Bronze | 1992 Barcelona | Blyth Tait | Equestrian | Individual eventing | 30 July 1992 |
| 57 | Silver | 1992 Barcelona | Danyon Loader | Swimming | Men's 200 metre butterfly | 30 July 1992 |
| 58 | Bronze | 1992 Barcelona | Lorraine Moller | Athletics | Women's marathon | 1 August 1992 |
| 59 | Gold | 1992 Barcelona | Barbara Kendall | Sailing | Women's Lechner | 2 August 1992 |
| 60 | Silver | 1992 Barcelona | Leslie Egnot; Jan Shearer | Sailing | Women's 470 | 3 August 1992 |
| 61 | Silver | 1992 Barcelona | Don Cowie; Rod Davis | Sailing | Star | 3 August 1992 |
| 62 | Bronze | 1992 Barcelona | Craig Monk | Sailing | Finn | 3 August 1992 |
| 63 | Bronze | 1992 Barcelona | David Tua | Boxing | Heavyweight | 8 August 1992 |
| 64 | Gold | 1996 Atlanta | Danyon Loader | Swimming | Men's 200 metre freestyle | 20 July 1996 |
| 65 | Gold | 1996 Atlanta | Danyon Loader | Swimming | Men's 400 metre freestyle | 23 July 1996 |
| 66 | Bronze | 1996 Atlanta | Vaughn Jefferis; Vicky Latta; Andrew Nicholson; Blyth Tait | Equestrian | Team eventing | 26 July 1996 |
| 67 | Gold | 1996 Atlanta | Blyth Tait | Equestrian | Individual eventing | 26 July 1996 |
| 68 | Silver | 1996 Atlanta | Sally Clark | Equestrian | Individual eventing | 26 July 1996 |
| 69 | Silver | 1996 Atlanta | Barbara Kendall | Sailing | Women's Mistral | 2 August 1996 |
| 70 | Bronze | 2000 Sydney | Mark Todd | Equestrian | Individual eventing | 22 September 2000 |
| 71 | Gold | 2000 Sydney | Rob Waddell | Rowing | Men's single sculls | 23 September 2000 |
| 72 | Bronze | 2000 Sydney | Barbara Kendall | Sailing | Women's Mistral | 24 September 2000 |
| 73 | Bronze | 2000 Sydney | Aaron McIntosh | Sailing | Men's Mistral | 24 September 2000 |
| 74 | Gold | 2004 Athens | Caroline Evers-Swindell; Georgina Evers-Swindell | Rowing | Women's double sculls | 21 August 2004 |
| 75 | Gold | 2004 Athens | Sarah Ulmer | Cycling | Women's individual pursuit | 22 August 2004 |
| 76 | Gold | 2004 Athens | Hamish Carter | Triathlon | Men's event | 26 August 2004 |
| 77 | Silver | 2004 Athens | Bevan Docherty | Triathlon | Men's event | 26 August 2004 |
| 78 | Silver | 2004 Athens | Ben Fouhy | Canoeing | Men's K-1 1000 m | 27 August 2004 |
| 79 | Bronze | 2008 Beijing | Mahé Drysdale | Rowing | Men's single sculls | 16 August 2008 |
| 80 | Bronze | 2008 Beijing | Nathan Twaddle; George Bridgewater | Rowing | Men's coxless pair | 16 August 2008 |
| 81 | Gold | 2008 Beijing | Georgina Evers-Swindell; Caroline Evers-Swindell | Rowing | Women's double sculls | 16 August 2008 |
| 82 | Silver | 2008 Beijing | Hayden Roulston | Cycling | Men's individual pursuit | 16 August 2008 |
| 83 | Gold | 2008 Beijing | Valerie Vili | Athletics | Women's shot put | 16 August 2008 |
| 84 | Bronze | 2008 Beijing | Hayden Roulston; Jesse Sergent; Marc Ryan; Sam Bewley | Cycling | Men's team pursuit | 18 August 2008 |
| 85 | Bronze | 2008 Beijing | Bevan Docherty | Triathlon | Men's triathlon | 19 August 2008 |
| 86 | Silver | 2008 Beijing | Nick Willis | Athletics | Men's 1500 metres | 19 August 2008 |
| 87 | Gold | 2008 Beijing | Tom Ashley | Sailing | Men's RS:X | 20 August 2008 |
| 88 | Bronze | 2012 London | Andrew Nicholson; Jonathan Paget; Caroline Powell; Jonelle Richards; Mark Todd | Equestrian | Team eventing | 31 July 2012 |
| 89 | Bronze | 2012 London | Juliette Haigh; Rebecca Scown | Rowing | Women's pair | 1 August 2012 |
| 90 | Gold | 2012 London | Nathan Cohen; Joseph Sullivan | Rowing | Men's double sculls | 2 August 2012 |
| 91 | Gold | 2012 London | Hamish Bond; Eric Murray | Rowing | Men's coxless pair | 3 August 2012 |
| 92 | Gold | 2012 London | Mahé Drysdale | Rowing | Men's single sculls | 3 August 2012 |
| 93 | Bronze | 2012 London | Sam Bewley; Aaron Gate; Westley Gough; Marc Ryan; Jesse Sergent | Cycling | Men's team pursuit | 3 August 2012 |
| 94 | Bronze | 2012 London | Peter Taylor; Storm Uru | Rowing | Men's lightweight double sculls | 4 August 2012 |
| 95 | Gold | 2012 London | Valerie Adams | Athletics | Women's shot put | 6 August 2012 |
| 96 | Bronze | 2012 London | Simon van Velthooven | Cycling | Men's keirin | 7 August 2012 |
| 97 | Silver | 2012 London | Peter Burling; Blair Tuke | Sailing | 49er class | 8 August 2012 |
| 98 | Gold | 2012 London | Jo Aleh; Polly Powrie | Sailing | Women's 470 | 10 August 2012 |
| 99 | Silver | 2012 London | Sarah Walker | Cycling | Women's BMX | 10 August 2012 |
| 100 | Gold | 2012 London | Lisa Carrington | Canoeing | Women's K-1 200 m | 11 August 2012 |
| 101 | Silver | 2016 Rio de Janeiro | Natalie Rooney | Shooting | Women's trap | 7 August 2016 |
| 102 | Silver | 2016 Rio de Janeiro | New Zealand women's rugby sevens team: Shakira Baker; Kelly Brazier; Gayle Broughton; Theresa Fitzpatrick; Sarah Goss; Huriana Manuel; Kayla McAlister; Tyla Nathan-Wong; Terina Te Tamaki; Ruby Tui; Niall Williams; Portia Woodman | Rugby sevens | Women's tournament | 8 August 2016 |
| 103 | Gold | 2016 Rio de Janeiro | Hamish Bond; Eric Murray | Rowing | Men's coxless pair | 11 August 2016 |
| 104 | Silver | 2016 Rio de Janeiro | Luuka Jones | Canoeing | Women's slalom K-1 | 11 August 2016 |
| 105 | Silver | 2016 Rio de Janeiro | Eddie Dawkins; Ethan Mitchell; Sam Webster | Cycling | Men's team sprint | 11 August 2016 |
| 106 | Silver | 2016 Rio de Janeiro | Genevieve Behrent; Rebecca Scown | Rowing | Women's coxless pair | 12 August 2016 |
| 107 | Silver | 2016 Rio de Janeiro | Valerie Adams | Athletics | Women's shot put | 12 August 2016 |
| 108 | Gold | 2016 Rio de Janeiro | Mahé Drysdale | Rowing | Men's single sculls | 13 August 2016 |
| 109 | Gold | 2016 Rio de Janeiro | Lisa Carrington | Canoeing | Women's K-1 200 m | 16 August 2016 |
| 110 | Bronze | 2016 Rio de Janeiro | Sam Meech | Sailing | Laser | 16 August 2016 |
| 111 | Bronze | 2016 Rio de Janeiro | Lisa Carrington | Canoeing | Women's K-1 500 m | 18 August 2016 |
| 112 | Silver | 2016 Rio de Janeiro | Jo Aleh; Polly Powrie | Sailing | Women's 470 | 18 August 2016 |
| 113 | Gold | 2016 Rio de Janeiro | Peter Burling; Blair Tuke | Sailing | Men's 49er | 18 August 2016 |
| 114 | Silver | 2016 Rio de Janeiro | Alex Maloney; Molly Meech | Sailing | Women's 49er FX | 18 August 2016 |
| 115 | Bronze | 2016 Rio de Janeiro | Tom Walsh | Athletics | Men's shot put | 18 August 2016 |
| 116 | Bronze | 2016 Rio de Janeiro | Eliza McCartney | Athletics | Women's pole vault | 19 August 2016 |
| 117 | Silver | 2016 Rio de Janeiro | Lydia Ko | Golf | Women's individual | 20 August 2016 |
| 118 | Bronze | 2016 Rio de Janeiro | Nick Willis | Athletics | Men's 1500 metres | 20 August 2016 |
| 119 | Bronze | 2018 PyeongChang | Zoi Sadowski-Synnott | Snowboarding | Women's big air | 22 February 2018 |
| 120 | Bronze | 2018 PyeongChang | Nico Porteous | Freestyle skiing | Men's halfpipe | 22 February 2018 |
| 121 | Bronze | 2020 Tokyo | Hayden Wilde | Triathlon | Men's event | 26 July 2021 |
| 122 | Silver | 2020 Tokyo | Brooke Donoghue; Hannah Osborne | Rowing | Women's double sculls | 28 July 2021 |
| 123 | Silver | 2020 Tokyo | New Zealand men's rugby sevens team: Kurt Baker; Scott Curry; Dylan Collier; Andrew Knewstubb; Ngarohi McGarvey-Black; Tim Mikkelson; Sione Molia; Etene Nanai-Seturo; Tone Ng Shiu; Amanaki Nicole; William Warbrick; Regan Ware; Joe Webber | Rugby sevens | Men's tournament | 28 July 2021 |
| 124 | Gold | 2020 Tokyo | Kerri Gowler; Grace Prendergast | Rowing | Women's coxless pair | 29 July 2021 |
| 125 | Gold | 2020 Tokyo | Emma Twigg | Rowing | Women's single sculls | 30 July 2021 |
| 126 | Silver | 2020 Tokyo | Kelsey Bevan; Emma Dyke; Jackie Gowler; Kerri Gowler; Ella Greenslade; Grace Prendergast; Beth Ross; Lucy Spoors; Caleb Shepherd (cox) | Rowing | Women's eight | 30 July 2021 |
| 127 | Gold | 2020 Tokyo | Hamish Bond; Michael Brake; Shaun Kirkham; Matt Macdonald; Tom Mackintosh; Tom Murray; Dan Williamson; Phillip Wilson; Sam Bosworth (cox) | Rowing | Men's eight | 30 July 2021 |
| 128 | Bronze | 2020 Tokyo | Marcus Daniell; Michael Venus | Tennis | Men's doubles | 30 July 2021 |
| 129 | Bronze | 2020 Tokyo | Dylan Schmidt | Gymnastics | Men's trampoline | 31 July 2021 |
| 130 | Gold | 2020 Tokyo | New Zealand women's rugby sevens team: Michaela Blyde; Kelly Brazier; Gayle Broughton; Theresa Fitzpatrick; Stacey Fluhler; Sarah Hirini; Shiray Kaka; Tyla Nathan-Wong; Risi Pouri-Lane; Alena Saili; Ruby Tui; Tenika Willison; Portia Woodman | Rugby sevens | Women's tournament | 31 July 2021 |
| 131 | Bronze | 2020 Tokyo | Valerie Adams | Athletics | Women's shot put | 1 August 2021 |
| 132 | Gold | 2020 Tokyo | Lisa Carrington | Canoeing | Women's K-1 200 m | 3 August 2021 |
| 133 | Bronze | 2020 Tokyo | David Nyika | Boxing | Men's heavyweight | 3 August 2021 |
| 134 | Gold | 2020 Tokyo | Lisa Carrington; Caitlin Regal | Canoeing | Women's K-2 500 m | 3 August 2021 |
| 135 | Silver | 2020 Tokyo | Peter Burling; Blair Tuke | Sailing | Men's 49er | 3 August 2021 |
| 136 | Bronze | 2020 Tokyo | Tom Walsh | Athletics | Men's shot put | 5 August 2021 |
| 137 | Gold | 2020 Tokyo | Lisa Carrington | Canoeing | Women's K-1 500 m | 5 August 2021 |
| 138 | Silver | 2020 Tokyo | Ellesse Andrews | Cycling | Women's keirin | 5 August 2021 |
| 139 | Silver | 2020 Tokyo | Campbell Stewart | Cycling | Men's omnium | 5 August 2021 |
| 140 | Bronze | 2020 Tokyo | Lydia Ko | Golf | Women's individual | 7 August 2021 |
| 141 | Gold | 2022 Beijing | Zoi Sadowski-Synnott | Snowboarding | Women's slopestyle | 6 February 2022 |
| 142 | Silver | 2022 Beijing | Zoi Sadowski-Synnott | Snowboarding | Women's big air | 15 February 2022 |
| 143 | Gold | 2022 Beijing | Nico Porteous | Freestyle skiing | Men's halfpipe | 19 February 2022 |
| 144 | Gold | 2024 Paris | New Zealand women's rugby sevens team: Michaela Blyde; Jazmin Hotham; Sarah Hirini; Tyla King; Jorja Miller; Manaia Nuku; Mahina Paul; Risi Pouri-Lane; Alena Saili; Theresa Fitzpatrick; Stacey Waaka; Portia Woodman | Rugby sevens | Women's tournament | 30 July 2024 |
| 145 | Silver | 2024 Paris | Hayden Wilde | Triathlon | Men's event | 31 July 2024 |
| 146 | Gold | 2024 Paris | Brooke Francis; Lucy Spoors | Rowing | Women's double sculls | 1 August 2024 |
| 147 | Bronze | 2024 Paris | Jackie Gowler; Phoebe Spoors; Davina Waddy; Kerri Williams | Rowing | Women's four | 1 August 2024 |
| 148 | Silver | 2024 Paris | Matt Macdonald; Oliver Maclean; Tom Murray; Logan Ullrich | Rowing | Men's four | 1 August 2024 |
| 149 | Silver | 2024 Paris | Isaac McHardie; William McKenzie | Sailing | 49er | 2 August 2024 |
| 150 | Silver | 2024 Paris | Emma Twigg | Rowing | Women's single sculls | 3 August 2024 |
| 151 | Gold | 2024 Paris | Finn Butcher | Canoeing | Men's kayak cross | 5 August 2024 |
| 152 | Silver | 2024 Paris | Ellesse Andrews; Shaane Fulton; Rebecca Petch | Cycling | Women's team sprint | 5 August 2024 |
| 153 | Silver | 2024 Paris | Ally Wollaston; Bryony Botha; Emily Shearman; Nicole Shields | Cycling | Women's team pursuit | 7 August 2024 |
| 154 | Bronze | 2024 Paris | Micah Wilkinson; Erica Dawson | Sailing | Mixed Nacra 17 | 8 August 2024 |
| 155 | Gold | 2024 Paris | Olivia Brett; Lisa Carrington; Alicia Hoskin; Tara Vaughan | Canoeing | Women's K-4 500 m | 8 August 2024 |
| 156 | Gold | 2024 Paris | Ellesse Andrews | Cycling | Women's keirin | 8 August 2024 |
| 157 | Gold | 2024 Paris | Lisa Carrington; Alicia Hoskin | Canoeing | Women's K-2 500 m | 9 August 2024 |
| 158 | Silver | 2024 Paris | Maddi Wesche | Athletics | Women's shot put | 9 August 2024 |
| 159 | Gold | 2024 Paris | Lisa Carrington | Canoeing | Women's K-1 500 m | 10 August 2024 |
| 160 | Gold | 2024 Paris | Lydia Ko | Golf | Women's individual | 10 August 2024 |
| 161 | Gold | 2024 Paris | Hamish Kerr | Athletics | Men's high jump | 10 August 2024 |
| 162 | Gold | 2024 Paris | Ellesse Andrews | Cycling | Women's sprint | 11 August 2024 |
| 163 | Bronze | 2024 Paris | Ally Wollaston | Cycling | Women's omnium | 11 August 2024 |
| 164 | Silver | 2026 Milano Cortina | Zoi Sadowski-Synnott | Snowboarding | Women's big air | 9 February 2026 |
| 165 | Bronze | 2026 Milano Cortina | Luca Harrington | Freestyle skiing | Men's slopestyle | 10 February 2026 |
| 166 | Silver | 2026 Milano Cortina | Zoi Sadowski-Synnott | Snowboarding | Women's slopestyle | 18 February 2026 |

At the 1972 Summer Olympics, Bruce Biddle originally finished fourth in the cycling road race. When the original Bronze medallist was subsequently disqualified for drug usage, Biddle should have been placed third. However he was not awarded the Bronze medal as he had not been asked to take a drugs test. Despite the continued efforts of the New Zealand Olympic Committee, the International Olympic Committee refused to overturn its decision.

=== Pre-NZOC medals ===
| # | Medal | Games | Name | Competing for | Sport | Event | Date |
|---|---|---|---|---|---|---|---|
| 1 | Gold | 1900 Paris | Victor Lindberg | Great Britain | Water polo | Men's tournament | 12 August 1900 |
| 2 | Bronze | 1908 London | Harry Kerr | Australasia | Athletics | Men's 3500 m walk | 14 July 1908 |
| 3 | Bronze | 1912 Stockholm | Tony Wilding | Australasia | Tennis | Men's indoor singles | 12 May 1912 |
| 4 | Gold | 1912 Stockholm | Malcolm Champion | Australasia | Swimming | Men's 4 × 200 m freestyle relay | 15 July 1912 |

== Milestones ==
- First medal (by a New Zealander): Victor Lindberg (1900, for Great Britain)
- First gold medal (by a New Zealander): Victor Lindberg (1900, for Great Britain)
- First medal (for New Zealand): Darcy Hadfield (1920)
- First gold medal (for New Zealand): Ted Morgan (1928)
- First female medallist: Yvette Williams (1952)
- First female gold medallist: Yvette Williams (1952)
- First double medallist: Peter Snell (1960, 1964)
- First double gold medallist: Peter Snell (1960, 1964)
- First triple medallist: Peter Snell (1960, 1964)
- First triple gold medallist: Peter Snell (1960, 1964)
- First quadruple medallists: Ian Ferguson & Paul McDonald (1984, 1988)
- First quadruple gold medallist: Ian Ferguson (1984, 1988)
- First quintuple medallist: Ian Ferguson & Paul McDonald (1984, 1988)
- First Winter medallist: Annelise Coberger (1992)
- First female double medallist: Vicky Latta (1992, 1996)
- First female triple medallist: Barbara Kendall (1992, 1996, 2000)
- First female double gold medallists: Caroline & Georgina Evers-Swindell (2004, 2008)
- First male Winter medallist: Nico Porteous (2018)
- First female quadruple medallist: Valerie Adams (2008, 2012, 2016, 2020)
- First female quintuple medallist: Lisa Carrington (2012, 2016, 2020)
- First female triple gold medallist: Lisa Carrington (2012, 2016, 2020)
- First female quadruple gold medallist: Lisa Carrington (2012, 2016, 2020)
- First sextuple medallist: Lisa Carrington (2012, 2016, 2020)
- First quintuple gold medallist: Lisa Carrington (2012, 2016, 2020)
- First Winter gold medallist: Zoi Sadowski-Synnott (2022)
- First Winter double medallist: Zoi Sadowski-Synnott (2018, 2022)
- First Winter triple medallist: Zoi Sadowski-Synnott (2018, 2022)
- First male Winter gold medallist: Nico Porteous (2022)
- First male Winter double medallist: Nico Porteous (2018, 2022)
- First septuple medallist: Lisa Carrington (2012, 2016, 2020, 2024)
- First sextuple gold medallist: Lisa Carrington (2012, 2016, 2020, 2024)
- First octuple medallist: Lisa Carrington (2012, 2016, 2020, 2024)
- First septuple gold medallist: Lisa Carrington (2012, 2016, 2020, 2024)
- First nonuple medallist: Lisa Carrington (2012, 2016, 2020, 2024)
- First octuple gold medallist: Lisa Carrington (2012, 2016, 2020, 2024)
- First Winter quadruple medallist: Zoi Sadowski-Synnott (2018, 2022, 2026)
- First Winter quintuple medallist: Zoi Sadowski-Synnott (2018, 2022, 2026)

== Youngest medallists ==
The following table lists all Olympic medals won by New Zealanders 20 years or younger.

Youngest medallists
| Name | Age | Date of birth | Medal date | Type | Notes |
|---|---|---|---|---|---|
| Nico Porteous | 16 years, 91 days | 23 November 2001 | 22 February 2018 | 3rd place, bronze medalist(s) | |
| Zoi Sadowski-Synnott | 16 years, 353 days | 6 March 2001 | 22 February 2018 | 3rd place, bronze medalist(s) | Youngest female medallist |
| Danyon Loader | 17 years, 100 days | 21 April 1975 | 30 July 1992 | 2nd place, silver medalist(s) | Youngest Summer medallist |
| Simon Dickie | 17 years, 202 days | 31 March 1951 | 19 October 1968 | 1st place, gold medalist(s) | Youngest gold medallist |
| Brett Hollister | 18 years, 78 days | 19 May 1966 | 5 August 1984 | 3rd place, bronze medalist(s) | |
| Terina Te Tamaki | 19 years, 79 days | 1 May 1997 | 8 August 2016 | 2nd place, silver medalist(s) | Youngest female Summer medallist |
| Lydia Ko | 19 years, 118 days | 24 April 1997 | 20 August 2016 | 2nd place, silver medalist(s) | |
| Eliza McCartney | 19 years, 252 days | 11 December 1996 | 19 August 2016 | 3rd place, bronze medalist(s) | |
| David Tua | 19 years, 261 days | 21 November 1972 | 8 August 1992 | 3rd place, bronze medalist(s) | |
| Jesse Sergent | 20 years, 41 days | 8 July 1988 | 18 August 2008 | 3rd place, bronze medalist(s) | |
| Bruce Kendall | 20 years, 42 days | 27 June 1964 | 8 August 1984 | 3rd place, bronze medalist(s) | |
| Gayle Broughton | 20 years, 64 days | 5 June 1996 | 8 August 2016 | 2nd place, silver medalist(s) | |
| Nico Porteous | 20 years, 88 days | 23 November 2001 | 19 February 2022 | 1st place, gold medalist(s) | Youngest Winter gold medallist |
| Annelise Coberger | 20 years, 157 days | 16 September 1971 | 20 February 1992 | 2nd place, silver medalist(s) | |
| Jorja Miller | 20 years, 173 days | 8 February 2004 | 30 July 2024 | 1st place, gold medalist(s) | Youngest female Summer gold medallist |
| Tara Vaughan | 20 years, 224 days | 28 December 2003 | 8 August 2024 | 1st place, gold medalist(s) | |
| Zoi Sadowski-Synnott | 20 years, 337 days | 6 March 2001 | 6 February 2022 | 1st place, gold medalist(s) | Youngest female Winter gold medallist |
| Zoi Sadowski-Synnott | 20 years, 346 days | 6 March 2001 | 15 February 2022 | 2nd place, silver medalist(s) | Youngest triple medallist |

== Oldest medallists ==
The following table lists all Olympic medals won by New Zealanders 36 years and older.

| Name | Age | Date of birth | Medal date | Type | Notes |
|---|---|---|---|---|---|
| Mark Todd | 56 years, 134 days | 1 March 1956 | 31 July 2012 | 3rd place, bronze medalist(s) | |
| Andrew Nicholson | 50 years, 365 days | 1 August 1961 | 31 July 2012 | 3rd place, bronze medalist(s) | |
| Ian Ballinger | 46 years, 364 days | 21 October 1925 | 19 October 1968 | 3rd place, bronze medalist(s) | |
| Vicky Latta | 45 years, 44 days | 10 June 1951 | 24 July 1996 | 3rd place, bronze medalist(s) | Oldest female medallist |
| Mark Todd | 44 years, 205 days | 1 March 1956 | 22 September 2000 | 3rd place, bronze medalist(s) | |
| Chris Timms | 41 years, 187 days | 24 March 1947 | 27 September 1988 | 2nd place, silver medalist(s) | |
| Vicky Latta | 41 years, 50 days | 10 June 1951 | 30 July 1992 | 2nd place, silver medalist(s) | |
| Caroline Powell | 39 years, 139 days | 14 March 1973 | 31 July 2012 | 3rd place, bronze medalist(s) | |
| Sally Clark | 38 years, 106 days | 11 April 1958 | 26 July 1996 | 2nd place, silver medalist(s) | |
| Rex Sellers | 37 years, 321 days | 11 November 1950 | 27 September 1988 | 2nd place, silver medalist(s) | |
| Mahé Drysdale | 37 years, 268 days | 19 November 1978 | 13 August 2016 | 1st place, gold medalist(s) | Oldest gold medallist |
| Emma Twigg | 37 years, 156 days | 1 March 1987 | 3 August 2024 | 2nd place, silver medalist(s) | |
| Chris Timms | 37 years, 137 days | 24 March 1947 | 8 August 1984 | 1st place, gold medalist(s) | |
| Lorraine Moller | 37 years, 61 days | 1 June 1955 | 1 August 1992 | 3rd place, bronze medalist(s) | |
| Rod Davis | 36 years, 342 days | 27 August 1955 | 3 August 1992 | 2nd place, silver medalist(s) | |
| Valerie Adams | 36 years, 299 days | 6 October 1984 | 1 August 2021 | 3rd place, bronze medalist(s) | |

== Most successful Olympians ==
New Zealanders who have won two or more gold medals, or three or more medals total:

| Name | Gold | Silver | Bronze | Total | Last medal |
|---|---|---|---|---|---|
| Lisa Carrington | 8 | – | 1 | 9 | 2024 Paris |
| Ian Ferguson | 4 | 1 | – | 5 | 1988 Seoul |
| Paul MacDonald | 3 | 1 | 1 | 5 | 1988 Seoul |
| Peter Snell | 3 | – | – | 3 | 1964 Tokyo |
| Hamish Bond | 3 | – | – | 3 | 2020 Tokyo |
| Ellesse Andrews | 2 | 2 | – | 4 | 2024 Paris |
| Valerie Adams | 2 | 1 | 1 | 4 | 2020 Tokyo |
| Danyon Loader | 2 | 1 | – | 3 | 1996 Atlanta |
| Theresa Fitzpatrick | 2 | 1 | – | 3 | 2024 Paris |
| Tyla King | 2 | 1 | – | 3 | 2024 Paris |
| Portia Woodman | 2 | 1 | – | 3 | 2024 Paris |
| Mark Todd | 2 | – | 3 | 5 | 2012 London |
| Simon Dickie | 2 | – | 1 | 3 | 1976 Montreal |
| Mahé Drysdale | 2 | – | 1 | 3 | 2016 Rio de Janeiro |
| Dick Joyce | 2 | – | – | 2 | 1972 Munich |
| Alan Thompson | 2 | – | – | 2 | 1984 Los Angeles |
| Caroline Evers-Swindell | 2 | – | – | 2 | 2008 Beijing |
| Georgina Evers-Swindell | 2 | – | – | 2 | 2008 Beijing |
| Eric Murray | 2 | – | – | 2 | 2016 Rio de Janeiro |
| Alicia Hoskin | 2 | – | – | 2 | 2024 Paris |
| Zoi Sadowski-Synnott | 1 | 3 | 1 | 5 | 2026 Milano Cortina |
| Peter Burling | 1 | 2 | – | 3 | 2020 Tokyo |
| Blair Tuke | 1 | 2 | – | 3 | 2020 Tokyo |
| Blyth Tait | 1 | 1 | 2 | 4 | 1996 Atlanta |
| Barbara Kendall | 1 | 1 | 1 | 3 | 2000 Sydney |
| Kerri Williams | 1 | 1 | 1 | 3 | 2024 Paris |
| Lydia Ko | 1 | 1 | 1 | 3 | 2024 Paris |
| Andrew Nicholson | – | 1 | 2 | 3 | 2012 London |

== See also ==
- New Zealand at the Olympics
- New Zealand at the Paralympics
