= Doak (name) =

Doak is a surname and a masculine given name. It may refer to:

== Surname ==
- Bill Doak (1891–1954), American Major League Baseball pitcher
- Bob Doak (1881–1942), American college basketball player and college football, basketball and baseball head coach
- Charles Doak (1884–1956), American college baseball player and head coach
- Chris Doak (born 1977), Scottish professional golfer
- David Doak (born 1967), Northern Irish video game designer
- Don Doak, Australian rugby league footballer
- Gary Doak (1946–2017), National Hockey League defenceman
- John Doak (canoeist) (born 1959), Australian sprint canoer
- John D. Doak, American politician from Oklahoma
- Nathan Doak (born 2001), Irish rugby union player
- Neil Doak (born 1972), Northern Irish cricketer and rugby union player
- Peter Doak (born 1944), Australian Olympic sprint freestyle swimmer
- Robert Doak (born 1958), Australian sprint canoer
- Saba Doak (1879–1918), American soprano singer
- Samuel Doak (1749–1830), American Presbyterian clergyman, educator and abolitionist
- Shareen Doak (born 1978), British university professor and scientist
- Sloan Doak (1886–1965), American equestrian who competed in the 1920 Summer Olympics
- Tom Doak, golf course architect
- Wade Doak (1940–2019), New Zealand marine conservationist, scuba diver, photographer and filmmaker
- William N. Doak (1882–1933), American labor leader

== Given name ==
- Doak S. Campbell (1888–1973), president of Florida State College for Women
- Doak Cox (1917–2003), Hawaiian geologist
- Doak Field (born 1958), American football player
- Doak Snead (1949–2020), American singer and songwriter
- Doak Walker (1927–1998), American football player; member of the Pro Football Hall of Fame

== See also ==
- Ben Gannon-Doak (born 2005), Scottish football player
- Nan Doak-Davis (born 1962), American long-distance runner
- Doakes (disambiguation)
