= Doak =

Doak may refer to:

== People ==
- Doak (name), a list of people with the surname or given name

== Places ==
- Doak, West Virginia, United States, an unincorporated community
- Doak Island, Nunavut, Canada
- Doak Historic Site, New Brunswick, Canada

== Other uses ==
- Doak Campbell Stadium, commonly known as the Doak, home to the Florida State Seminoles football team
- Doak Field, home to the North Carolina State University Wolfpack baseball team
- Doak VZ-4, American prototype VTOL aircraft built in the 1950s
- Destiny of Ancient Kingdoms, the first South African free-to-play massively multiplayer online role-playing game

== See also ==
- Doak–Little House, a historic building in South Strabane Township, Pennsylvania
- Lady Doak College, a women's post-secondary educational institution located in the community of Chinnachokikulum in the city of Madurai, India
