= Bethlehem College =

Bethlehem College or Bethlehem Campus may refer to:

- Bethlehem College, Ashfield, a campus of St Vincent's College Ashfield and former girls' school in New South Wales, Australia
- Bethlehem Campus, a campus of several Christian educational institutions, Bethlehem, New Zealand

== See also ==
- Bethlehem University, Bethlehem, Palestine
