= Canoeing at the 1984 Summer Olympics – Men's K-1 1000 metres =

The men's K-1 1000 metres event was an individual kayaking event conducted as part of the Canoeing at the 1984 Summer Olympics program.

== Medalists ==
Gold	Silver	Bronze
Alan Thompson (NZL)	Milan Janić (YUG)	Greg Barton (USA)

== Results ==
=== Heats ===
The 19 competitors first raced in three heats on August 7. The top three finishers from each of the heats advanced directly to the semifinals. All remaining competitors competed in the repechages later that day.

Heat 1
1.	Philippe Boccara (FRA)	3:53.51	QS
2.	Kalle Sundqvist (SWE)	3:56.86	QS
3.	Vasile Dîba (ROU)	3:57.95	QS
4.	Antoon De Brauwer (BEL)	3:59.21	QR
5.	Pedro Alegre (ESP)	3:59.95	QR
6.	Alan Thomson (CAN)	4:03.38	QR
7.	Veli-Pekka Harjola (FIN)	4:03.40	QR
8.	Tsoi Ngai Won (HKG)	4:44.09	QR
Heat 2
1.	Alan Thompson (NZL)	3:53.41	QS
2.	Stephen Jackson (GBR)	3:55.12	QS
3.	Peter Genders (AUS)	3:58.35	QS
4.	Christoph Wolf (FRG)	4:00.21	QR
5.	Ian Pringle (IRL)	4:09.21	QR
6.	Adogon Adogon (CIV)	4:22.30	QR
Heat 3
1.	Milan Janić (YUG)	3:51.72	QS
2.	Greg Barton (USA)	3:52.08	QS
3.	Einar Rasmussen (NOR)	3:57.78	QS
4.	Paolo Carraro (ITA)	4:00.21	QR
5.	Atilio Vásquez (ARG)	4:03.86	QR

=== Repechages ===
Taking place on August 7, two repechages were held. The top four finishers in each repechage advanced to the semifinals.

Repechage 1
1.	Alan Thomson (CAN)	3:56.64	QS
2.	Paolo Carraro (ITA)	3:57.25	QS
3.	Ian Pringle (IRL)	4:07.34	QS
4.	Antoon De Brauwer (BEL)	4:18.60	QS
5.	Tsoi Ngai Won (HKG)	4:35.45
Repechage 2
1.	Christoph Wolf (FRG)	4:03.47	QS
2.	Atilio Vásquez (ARG)	4:04.42	QS
3.	Veli-Pekka Harjola (FIN)	4:19.40	QS
4.	Pedro Alegre (ESP)	4:19.48	QS
5.	Adogon Adogon (CIV)	4:20.11

=== Semifinals ===
Raced on August 9, the top three finishers from each of the three semifinals advanced to the final.

Semifinal 1
1.	Philippe Boccara (FRA)	3:52.12	QF
2.	Greg Barton (USA)	3:54.18	QF
3.	Peter Genders (AUS)	3:56.09	QF
4.	Antoon De Brauwer (BEL)	3:57.84
5.	Alan Thomson (CAN)	3:58.41
6.	Veli-Pekka Harjola (FIN)	4:02.70
Semifinal 2
1.	Alan Thompson (NZL)	3:58.90	QF
2.	Kalle Sundqvist (SWE)	4:01.01	QF
3.	Pedro Alegre (ESP)	4:02.40	QF
4.	Paolo Carraro (ITA)	4:03.84
5.	Atilio Vásquez (ARG)	4:07.15
6.	Einar Rasmussen (NOR)	4:09.77
Semifinal 3
1.	Stephen Jackson (GBR)	3:56.57	QF
2.	Milan Janić (YUG)	3:58.43	QF
3.	Vasile Dîba (ROU)	3:59.40	QF
4.	Christoph Wolf (FRG)	4:00.33
5.	Ian Pringle (IRL)	4:02.81

=== Final ===
The final took place on August 11.

Gold	Alan Thompson (NZL)	3:45.73
Silver	Milan Janić (YUG)	3:46.88
Bronze	Greg Barton (USA)	3:47.38
4.	Kalle Sundqvist (SWE)	3:48.69
5.	Peter Genders (AUS)	3:49.11
6.	Philippe Boccara (FRA)	3:49.38
7.	Vasile Dîba (ROU)	3:51.61
8.	Stephen Jackson (GBR)	3:52.25
9.	Pedro Alegre (ESP)	3:53.20
