= Eichenberger =

Eichenberger may refer to:

- USS Eichenberger (DE-202), American ship
- Eichenberger Bach, German river

== As a surname ==
- Marcel Eichenberger (born 1960), Swiss canoer
- Sabine Eichenberger (born 1968), Swiss canoer
- Stefan Eichenberger (born 1984), Swiss film producer
