= Raymond Martin =

Raymond Martin may refer to:

- Raymond Martin (academic) (1926–2020), Australian chemistry professor and university administrator
- Raymond Martin (wheelchair athlete) (born 1994), American wheelchair racer
- Raymond Martin (canoeist) (born 1960), Australian sprint canoeist
- Raymond Martin (cyclist) (born 1949), French former road bicycle racer

== See also ==
- Ramón Martí, 13th-century friar and theologian
- Ray Martin (disambiguation)
