= Philippe Boccara =

French-born American sprint kayaker

Medal record

Men's Kayak sprint

Olympic Games
Bronze medal – third place	1984 Los Angeles	K-4 1000 m

World Championships
Gold medal – first place	1985 Mechelen	K-2 1000 m
Gold medal – first place	1987 Duisburg	K-2 10000 m
Gold medal – first place	1990 Poznań	K-1 10000 m
Gold medal – first place	1991 Paris	K-2 10000 m
Silver medal – second place	1987 Duisburg	K-2 1000 m
Bronze medal – third place	1990 Poznań	K-1 1000 m

Philippe Boccara (born July 6, 1959) is a French-born American sprint kayaker who competed from the late 1970s to the early 2000s (decade). He appeared in six Olympics for France (1980 to 1992) and the United States (1996, 2000).

He won a bronze medal for France in the K-4 1000 m event at the 1984 Olympics with teammates François Barouh, Pascal Boucherit, and Didier Vavasseur.

Boccara also won six medals for the French at the ICF Canoe Sprint World Championships with four golds (K-1 10000 m: 1990, K-2 1000 m: 1985, K-2 10000 m: 1987, 1991), a silver (K-2 1000 m: 1987), and a bronze (K-1 1000 m: 1990).

In 2000, he became the first Kayaker to compete at six Olympics. This was matched four years later by German-born Italian Josefa Idem-Guerrini and German Birgit Fischer. (Idem-Guerrini went on in 2008 to become the first canoeist to compete at seven Olympics.)

He is the first French-born athlete to compete at six Olympics. This was matched by legendary French cyclist Jeannie Longo in 2004 and surpassed by her in 2008.

== See also ==
- List of athletes with the most appearances at Olympic Games
