= Grant Bramwell =

New Zealand sprint canoeist

Medal record

Men's canoe sprint

Olympic Games
Gold medal – first place	1984 Los Angeles	K-4 1000 m

World Championships
Bronze medal – third place	1985 Mechelen	K-1 10000 m

Grant Bramwell (born 28 January 1961 in Gisborne, New Zealand) is a sprint canoeist who competed in the 1980s. Competing in two Summer Olympics, he won a gold medal in the K-4 1000 m at Los Angeles in 1984 with Alan Thompson, Ian Ferguson and Paul MacDonald. Bramwell also won a K-1 10000 m bronze at the 1985 ICF Canoe Sprint World Championships in Mechelen.

Bramwell was involved in a variety of sports when he was younger including: swimming (representing Poverty Bay while at school), multisport (winning the New Zealand Ironman in 1985 and 1989 and surf live-saving). He was educated at Lytton High School. After retiring from top-level canoeing Bramwell was a selector for New Zealand canoeing in the 1990s.
