= New Zealand Olympic Museum =

Former sports museum in Wellington, New Zealand

Coordinates: 41°17′07″S 174°46′42″E

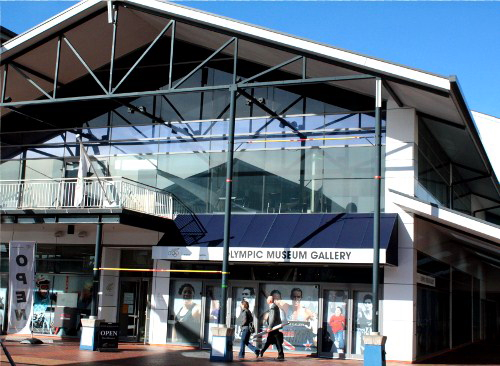
- Exterior of former New Zealand Olympic Museum building
- Established: 1998-2013
- Location: Wellington, New Zealand (closed)
- Website: www.olympic.org.nz/nzoc/olympic-museum

The New Zealand Olympic Museum, was situated on Queens Wharf, Wellington, New Zealand. It was established on 23 June 1998 and closed in January 2013 after the New Zealand Olympic Committee (NZOC) relocated to Auckland. The museum's collection focuses on New Zealand's involvement in the Olympic movement and promoting Olympic values.

== Collection ==
The museum had the Lonsdale Cup (NZOC) on permanent display, as well as the Te Mahutonga Cloak when it was not attending the games.

=== Te Kohatu Mauri Stone ===
On Olympic Day 23 June 2004, Te Runanga O Ngai Tahu presented two greenstone taonga to the New Zealand Olympic Committee a pendant that would travel with the Te Mahutonga Cloak and a Maori touchstone that would travel with the New Zealand Olympic Team to all future games.

== See also ==
- New Zealand at the Olympics
- New Zealand Olympic medallists
