= Raymond Martin (canoeist) =

Australian canoeist (born 1960)

Personal information
- Nickname: Ray Martin
- National team: Australia
- Born: 7 February 1960 (age 66)
- Home town: Minto, New South Wales, Australia
- Education: University of New South Wales; Australian Catholic University
- Occupations: Canoeist; Principal
- Years active: 1984–present
- Employers: Australian Olympic Committee; Sydney Catholic Schools
- Height: 177 cm (5 ft 10 in)
- Weight: 77 kg (170 lb)
- Other interests: Education

Sport
- Country: Australia (canoeing)
- Sport: Canoeing (1984)
- Event: Sprint canoe racing
- Team: Australian Olympic team
- Turned pro: 1984
- Coached by: Adrian Powell

Achievements and titles
- Olympic finals: 1984 Summer Olympics: K-4 1000 m – 7th
- Highest world ranking: 7th (1984)
- Updated on 11 August 1984

Raymond "Ray" Martin (born 7 February 1960) is an Australian sprint canoeist. He participated in the K-4 1000 m event at the 1984 Summer Olympics, finishing in 7th place in the final.

== Education career ==
Martin was the assistant principal of De La Salle College, Kingsgrove, between 1997 and 1998, and Trinity Catholic College, Auburn/Regents Park, between 2002 and 2007. He was the principal of Holy Spirit Catholic College, Lakemba, between 2008 and 2015, and Marist Catholic College Penshurst, between 2016 and 2022.

He is currently the foundation principal of St Vincent's College in Ashfield, which was formed as a result of the amalgamation of De La Salle College Ashfield, Bethlehem College and St Vincent's Primary School in 2023.

== See also ==
- Canoeing at the 1984 Summer Olympics
