= Don Irvine =

Don or Donald Irvine may refer to:

- Donald Roy Irvine (1920–1994), Canadian politician
- Don Irvine (wrestler) (1921–1973), British Olympic wrestler
- Donald Irvine (physician) (1935–2018), British general practitioner and president of the General Medical Council
- Don Irvine (canoeist) (born 1954), Canadian sprint canoeist
