= Don Brien =

Canadian sprint canoer

Medal record

Men's canoe sprint

World Championships
Bronze medal – third place	1985 Mechelen	K-2 1000 m

Don Brien (born September 1, 1959 in Halifax, Nova Scotia) is a Canadian sprint canoer, who competed in the mid to late 1980s. He won a bronze medal with partner Colin Shaw in the K-2 1000 m at the 1985 ICF Canoe Sprint World Championships at Mechelen.

Brien also competed in two Summer Olympics, earning his best finish of ninth in the K-4 1000 m event at Los Angeles in 1984.

Brien began paddling in 1975 at the Banook Canoe Club in Dartmouth, Nova Scotia. Don's older brother Alvin Brien was also a successful paddler, and served as an early mentor. Alvin and Don were both named to the 1980 Summer Olympics in Moscow, but did not compete due to the Canadian boycott of those games. In 1982, Alvin died at sea after a sailing accident. Don Brien went on to compete at both the 1984 and 1988 Summer Olympic Games. He was on the Canadian national team for 12 years, and achieved some of the best international results of any Canadian kayaker during that period.

Following his paddling career, Brien went on to become an orthopaedic surgeon. He lives in Sydney, Nova Scotia.
