= Lars Ivar Gran =

Norwegian sprint canoer (born 1959)

Medal record

Men's canoe sprint

World Championships
Silver medal – second place	1983 Tampere	K-4 10000 m

Lars Ivar Gran (born 1959) is a Norwegian sprint canoer who competed in the early to mid-1980s. He won a silver medal in the K-4 10000 m at the 1983 ICF Canoe Sprint World Championships in Tampere.

He resides in Tønsberg.
