= Scott Wooden =

Australian canoeist (born 1963)

Scott Wooden (born 3 August 1963) is an Australian sprint canoeist who competed in the mid-1980s. He finished seventh in the K-4 1000 m event at the 1984 Summer Olympics in Los Angeles.
