= Detlef Schmidt =

Medal record

Men's canoe sprint

World Championships
Bronze medal – third place	1986 Montreal	K-4 500 m

Detlef Schmidt (born 24 February 1958) is a West German sprint canoer who competed in the mid to late 1980s. He won a silver medal in the K-4 500 m event at the 1986 ICF Canoe Sprint World Championships in Montreal.

Schmidt also finished eighth in the K-4 1000 m event at the 1984 Summer Olympics in Los Angeles.
