= Geir Kvillum =

Norwegian canoeist (born 1959)

Medal record

Men's canoe sprint

World Championships
Silver medal – second place	1983 Tampere	K-4 10000 m

Geir Kvillum (born 6 May 1959) is a Norwegian sprint canoeist who competed in the early to mid-1980s. He won a silver medal in the K-4 10000 m at the 1983 ICF Canoe Sprint World Championships in Tampere.

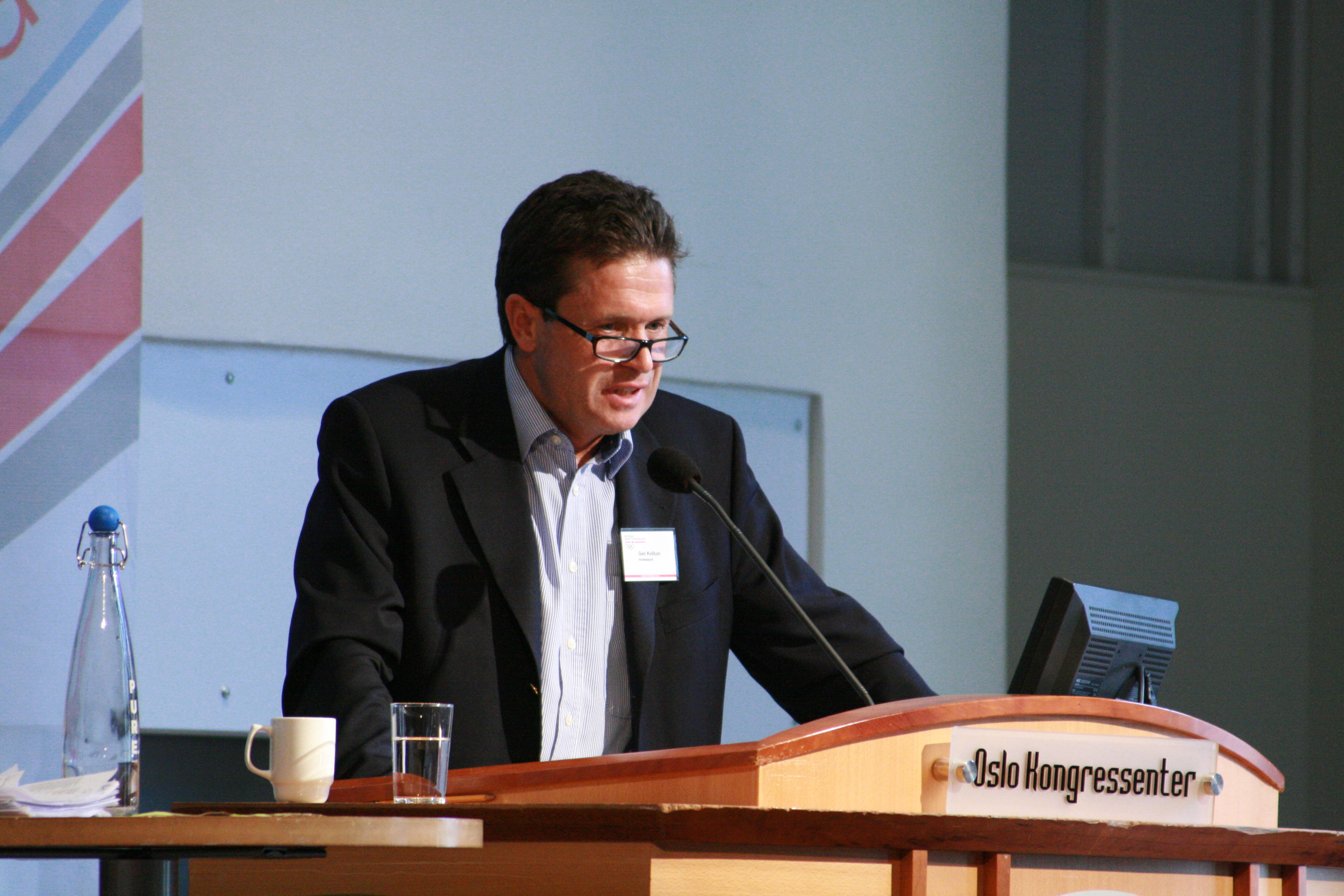

Kvillum also competed at the 1984 Summer Olympics in Los Angeles in the K-4 1000 m event, but was eliminated in the semifinals.

He has been a second vice president of the Norwegian Confederation of Sports, president of the Norwegian Canoe Association and board member of the European Canoe Association. He represents the club Bærum KK.

== Sources ==
- Evans, Hilary; Gjerde, Arild; Heijmans, Jeroen; Mallon, Bill; et al. "Geir Kvillum". Olympics at Sports-Reference.com. Sports Reference LLC. Archived from the original on 2012-10-21.
