= Ray Martin =

Ray Martin may refer to:

- Ray Martin (Australian footballer) (1909–1988), Australian rules footballer
- Ray Martin (baseball) (1925–2013), American baseball player
- Ray Martin (English footballer) (born 1945), English association football player
- Ray Martin (orchestra leader) (1918–1988), British orchestra leader
- Ray Martin (politician) (born 1941), Canadian politician and former leader of the Alberta New Democratic Party
- Ray Martin (pool player) (born 1936), American pool player
- Ray Martin (television presenter) (born 1944), Australian journalist/television presenter
- Ray Martin (shot putter) (born 1935), American shot putter, 1955 All-American for the USC Trojans track and field team

== See also ==
- Raymond Martin (disambiguation)
