= Stephen Jackson (canoeist) =

British canoeist (born 1956)

Medal record

Men's canoe sprint

Representing United Kingdom

World Championships
Gold medal – first place	1983 Tampere	K-2 10000 m
Bronze medal – third place	1981 Nottingham	K-4 10000 m

Stephen Jackson (born 18 September 1956) is a British canoe sprinter who competed in the early to mid-1980s. He won two medals at the ICF Canoe Sprint World Championships with a gold (K-2 10000 m: 1983) and a bronze (K-4 10000 m: 1981).

Jackson also finished eighth in the K-1 1000 m event at the 1984 Summer Olympics in Los Angeles.
