= Jeremy West =

British canoeist

Medal record

Men's canoe sprint

World Championships
Gold medal – first place	1986 Montreal	K-1 500 m
Gold medal – first place	1986 Montreal	K-1 1000 m

Jeremy West (born 29 April 1961) is a British sprint canoeist who competed in the mid to late 1980s. He won two gold medals at the 1986 ICF Canoe Sprint World Championships in Montreal, earning them in the K-1 500 m and K-1 1000 m events.

West also competed in two Summer Olympics, earning his best finish of fifth in the K-4 1000 m event at Los Angeles in 1984.
