= Dan Schnurrenberger =

American canoeist

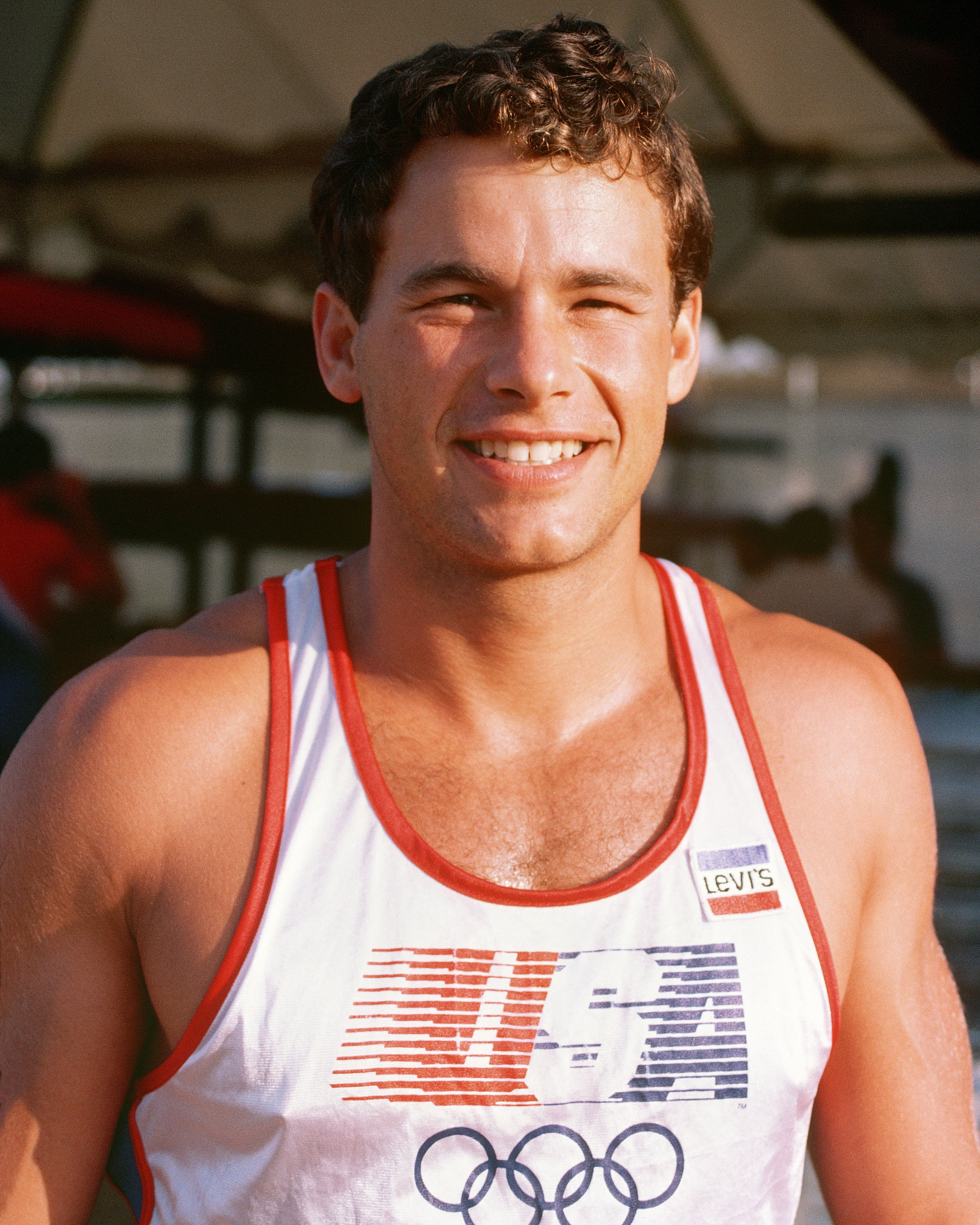
Schnurrenberger in 1984

Dan Schnurrenberger (born November 17, 1955) is an American sprint canoer who competed in the mid-1980s. As a youth, he kayaked at the Valley Mill Camp, and continued training for National Championships and the U.S. Olympic Team at the Washington Canoe Club in Washington, DC. Schnurrenberger is credited as being among the first group of kayakers to run Great Falls, a waterfall in Great Falls, Virginia, in August 1976. He was the U.S.A. Wildwater K-1 Men's Champion in 1979, 1980, and 1981, and C-2 Champion with Chuck Lyda in 1991. He was also slated to be on the U.S. Olympic team for the 1980 Summer Olympics in Moscow, but did not compete because of the U.S. boycott of the Soviet Union. He was eliminated in the repechages of the K-4 1000 m event at the 1984 Summer Olympics in Los Angeles.
