= Andrew Sheriff =

British sprint canoer (born 1957)

Andrew C. Sheriff (born 2 April 1957) is a British canoe sprinter who competed in the mid to late 1980s. Competing in two Summer Olympics, he earned his best finish of fifth in the K-4 1000 m event at Los Angeles in 1984.
