= Colin Shaw (canoeist) =

Canadian canoeist

Medal record

Men's canoe sprint

World Championships
Bronze medal – third place	1985 Mechelen	K-2 1000 m

Colin Shaw (born March 17, 1954, in Powell River, British Columbia) is a retired Canadian sprint canoer who competed from the mid-1980s to the early 1990s. He won bronze medal with partner Don Brien in the K-2 1000 m event at the 1985 ICF Canoe Sprint World Championships in Mechelen.

Shaw also competed in two Summer Olympics, earning his best finish of ninth in the K-4 1000 m event at Los Angeles in 1984.
