= Tsoi Ngai Won =

Hong Kong sprint canoer

Tsoi Ngai Won (born June 12, 1960) is a Hong Kong sprint canoer who competed in the mid-1980s. He was eliminated in the repechages of both the K-1 1000 m and the K-2 500 m events at the 1984 Summer Olympics in Los Angeles.
