= Grayson Bourne =

British sprint canoer

Medal record

Men's canoe sprint

Representing United Kingdom

World Championships
Gold medal – first place	1990 Poznań	K-2 10000 m
Silver medal – second place	1989 Plovdiv	K-2 10000 m

Grayson Bourne is a British canoe sprinter who competed from the early 1980s to the mid-1990s. He won two medals in the K-2 10000 m event at the ICF Canoe Sprint World Championships with a gold (1990) and a silver (K-2 10000 m: 1989).

Bourne also competed in five Summer Olympics, earning his best finish of fifth in the K-4 1000 m event at Los Angeles in 1984. He won 67 British National titles. Bourne now owns the most successful Kayak ergometer company KayakPro USA LLC who have been suppliers of ergometers to the last 5 Olympic Games and to NASA.
