= Kevin Smith (canoeist) =

British sprint canoer (born 1961)

Kevin Smith (born 22 March 1961) is a British canoe sprinter from Stockton-on-Tees, England. Competing in two Summer Olympics, both Los Angeles 1984 and Seoul 1988 - he earned his best finish of fifth in the K-4 1000 m event at Los Angeles.
