= Peter Genders =

Australian sprint canoeist (born 1959)

Peter Genders (born 6 March 1959) is an Australian sprint canoeist who competed in the mid-1980s. He finished fifth in the K-1 1000 m event while being eliminated in the repechages of the K-2 500 m events at the 1984 Summer Olympics in Los Angeles.
