= Christoph Wolf =

West German sprint canoer (born 1961)

Christoph Wolf (born March 26, 1961 in Emsdetten) is a West German sprint canoer who competed in the mid-1980s. He was eliminated in the semifinals of the K-1 1000 m event at the 1984 Summer Olympics in Los Angeles.
