= Mark Todd (equestrian) =

New Zealand horseman

Sir Mark Todd KNZM CBE
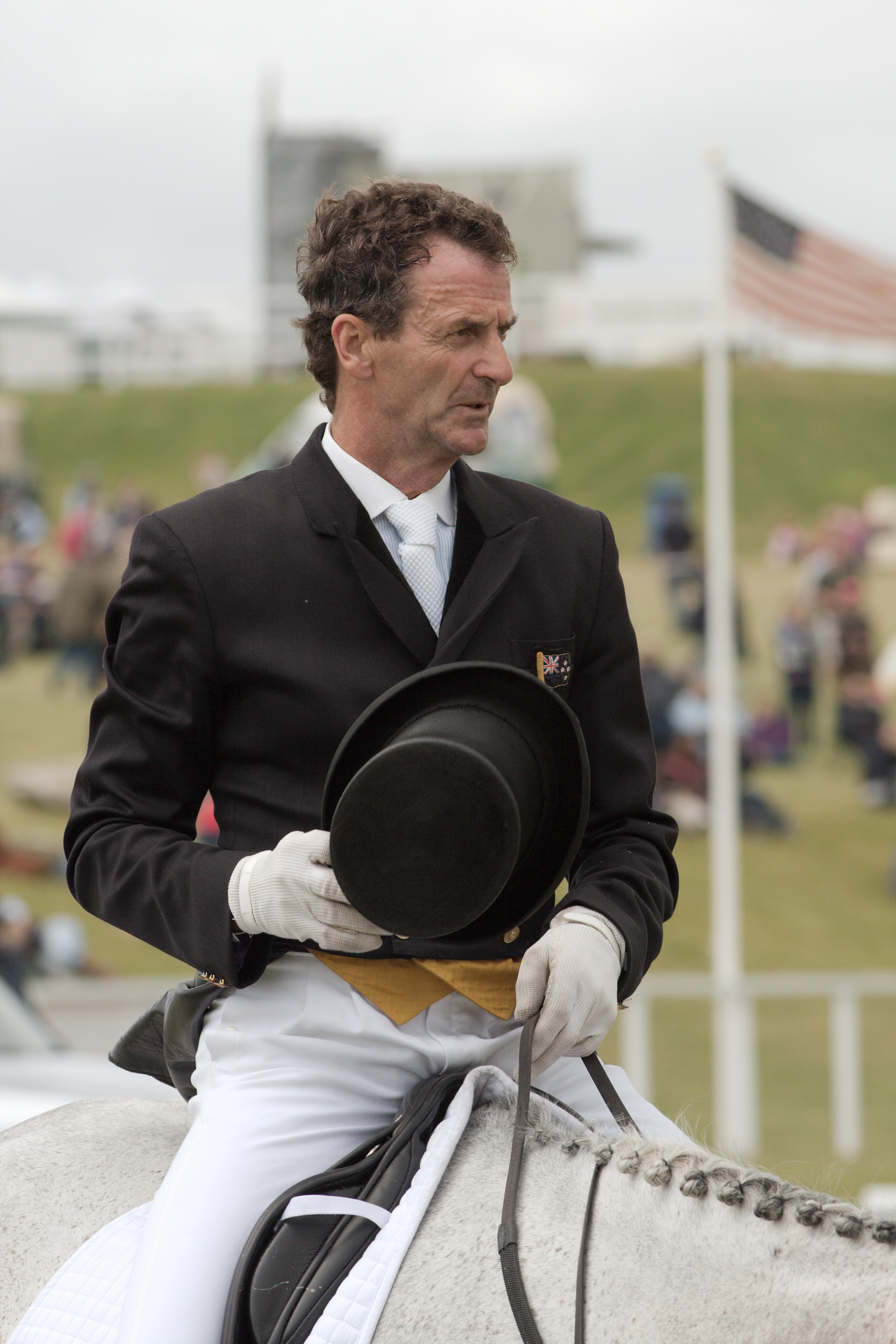
- Todd on Gandalf at the 2008 Barbury International Horse Trials

Personal information
- Full name: Mark James Todd
- Discipline: Eventing
- Born: 1 March 1956 (age 70); Cambridge, New Zealand
Medal record
Equestrian
Representing New Zealand
Event	1st	2nd	3rd
Olympic Games	2	1	3
World Championships	2	1	1
Total	4	2	4
Olympic Games
Gold medal – first place	1984 Los Angeles	Individual eventing
Gold medal – first place	1988 Seoul	Individual eventing
Silver medal – second place	1992 Barcelona	Team eventing
Bronze medal – third place	1988 Seoul	Team eventing
Bronze medal – third place	2000 Sydney	Individual eventing
Bronze medal – third place	2012 London	Team eventing
World Championships
Gold medal – first place	1990 Stockholm	Team eventing
Gold medal – first place	1998 Rome	Team eventing
Silver medal – second place	1998 Rome	Individual eventing
Bronze medal – third place	2010 Lexington	Team eventing

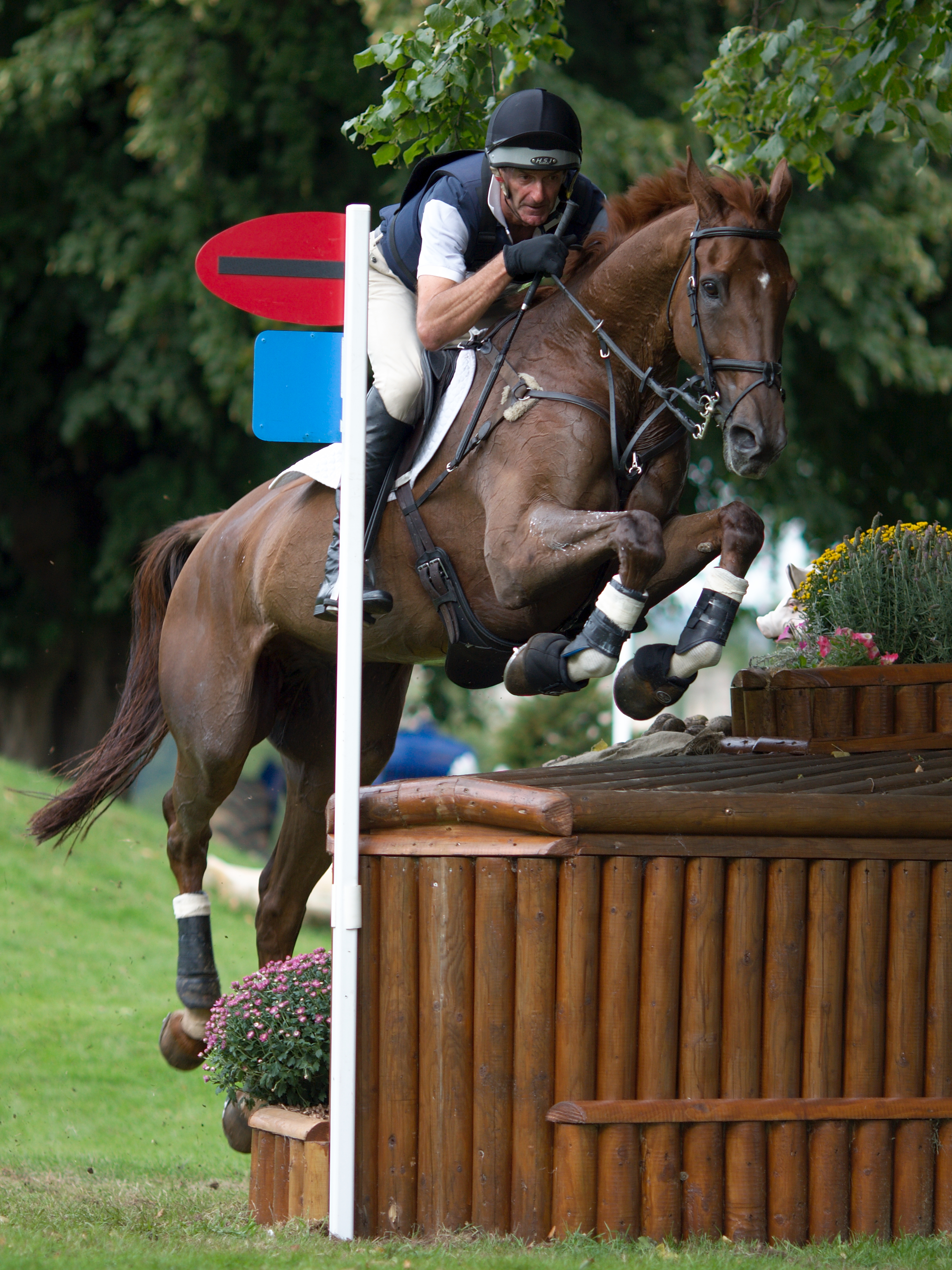
Todd and Major Milestone at the Dairy Farm during the cross-country phase of Burghley Horse Trials 2010

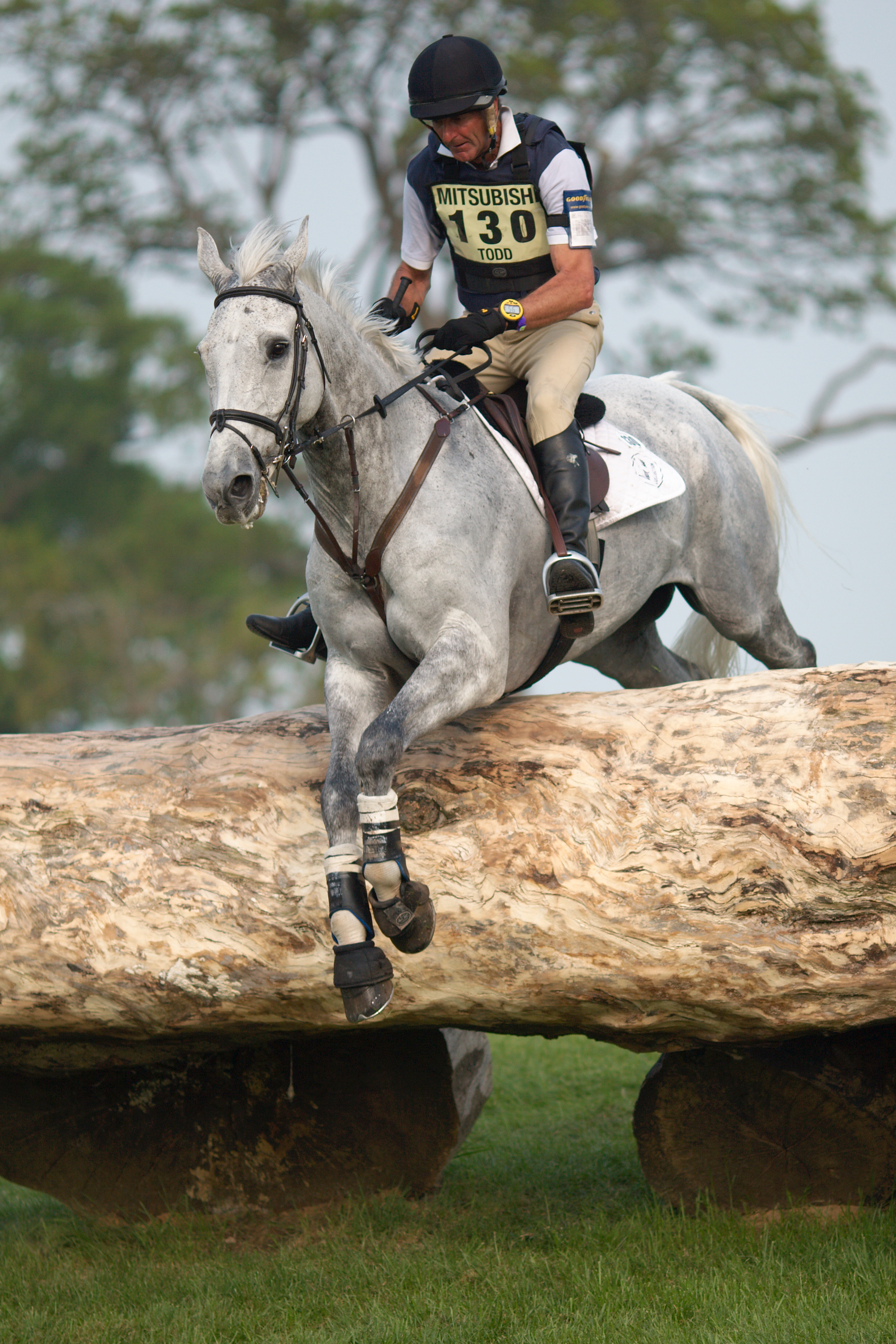
Todd and NZB Land Vision during the cross-country phase of the 2011 Badminton Horse Trials

Sir Mark James Todd KNZM CBE (born 1 March 1956) is a New Zealand horseman noted for his accomplishments in the discipline of eventing. He was voted Rider of the 20th century by the International Federation for Equestrian Sports.

He won gold medals at the Los Angeles (1984) and Seoul (1988) Olympics, the Badminton Horse Trials on four occasions, and the Burghley Horse Trials five times. As a member of New Zealand's Eventing team, he won gold medals at the World Championships in 1990 and 1998 (Rome), plus 20 or more other international events, and numerous other international individual and team titles.

In 1988, he was announced as the New Zealand Sportsperson of the year and winner of the Supreme Halberg Award. In the same year, he was inducted into the New Zealand Sports Hall of Fame.

On 25 April 2011, Todd completed a fourth Badminton victory riding NZB Land Vision, becoming the oldest winner of the event.

By winning his fifth Olympic medal at the 2012 Summer Olympics, Todd equalled the Olympic record established by Hungarian fencer Aladár Gerevich for the longest gap between first and last Olympic medals — 28 years — and shares the record for second-most Olympic medals won by a New Zealander with canoeists Ian Ferguson and Paul MacDonald. The 2016 Games were Todd's seventh, having previously competed in 1984, 1988, 1992, 2000, 2008 and 2012. Todd is the first New Zealander to have competed at seven Olympic Games.

In February 2022, a video emerged of Todd repeatedly hitting a horse with a branch for refusing to enter a water obstacle at a training clinic.

== Early life ==
Born in Cambridge, New Zealand, Todd developed a deep and abiding passion for horses. He rode at pony club as a youngster and competed at local shows.

Todd considered becoming a jockey but grew to 6 ft 2 in (1.88 m) so he moved into show jumping instead. In reference to his riding skills, fellow New Zealand team member, Andrew Nicholson, is quoted as saying "Mark can ride anything – he could go cross-country on a dairy cow!”

On leaving school Todd pursued a career as a farmer, gaining a Diploma of Agriculture at the Waikato Technical Institute, and working on farms while fitting in riding, competing and selling horses.

== Equestrian career ==
In 1978, Todd was part of New Zealand's first three-day eventing team to contest a world championship, at Lexington, Kentucky], United States. He was 10th after the dressage and second in the steeplechase, but then his horse, Tophunter, broke down during the cross-country stage. Thereafter, Todd moved to England, where he mucked out stables and obtained use of horses for event rides. At his first attempt, in 1980, he won the Badminton Horse Trials riding Southern Comfort. Todd was a virtual unknown when he arrived, with fellow New Zealander Andrew Nicholson as his groom.

Todd is recognized as a pioneer of three-day eventing in New Zealand. His success was followed by fellow New Zealand Olympic medallists and world champions Tinks Pottinger, Blyth Tait, Vaughn Jefferis, Vicky Latta, Sally Clark and Nicholson. Jefferis once said: "We all owe a huge debt to Mark Todd. He was the first, and he paved the way for us".

=== Career ===
Todd became a popular sportsman in his home country and some of the horses he rode also became well known. Most notable was Charisma, the 15.2 hands (62 inches, 157 cm) Thoroughbred (with 1/16 Percheron) Todd rode when winning successive Olympic gold medals in 1984 and 1988. Charisma was retired to a Waikato farm after the Seoul Olympics but appeared with Todd for later public appearances including flag bearing at the 1990 Commonwealth Games in Auckland New Zealand. Charisma died aged 30 from a broken shoulder.

In 1984 Todd borrowed a yard at Kington St Michael, Wiltshire, from his friend Charles Cottenham, so that he could base himself in England.

In the 1985 New Year Honours, Todd was appointed a Member of the Order of the British Empire, and he was elevated to Commander of the Order of the British Empire in the 1995 Queen's Birthday Honours.

Todd also competed at the Sydney 2000 Summer Olympics, where he won an individual bronze medal. His win was somewhat clouded by allegations in the Sunday Mirror that Todd had used cocaine with a homosexual partner prior to final team selection. The controversy was a matter of national debate, and almost cost Todd his team selection.

=== Retirement ===
Todd retired from international competition following the Olympics and returned to live in New Zealand. Todd and his family moved to Rivermonte Farm near his home town of Cambridge in Waikato to breed horses and concentrate on several business ventures, including the manufacture/retail of harness and other tack. His Thoroughbreds enjoyed racing success, including wins in the Wellington Cup and New Zealand Oaks. He remained closely involved with the administration of the eventing, acting as coach for the NZ Olympic Eventing team at Athens in 2004. He continued to compete in eventing at a local level and to support the sport in general.

=== Comeback ===
On 25 January 2008, Horse & Hound announced online that Todd would make a return to eventing eight years after he retired in Sydney. He purchased a 10-year-old grey called Gandalf to campaign for selection to ride at the 2008 Summer Olympics.

At the 2008 Olympics in Beijing, the New Zealand team finished fifth, and Todd placed 17th individually.

In February 2009, Todd announced that he was making a full return to elite level eventing, basing himself in England with a team of up to eight horses including Gandalf.

Competing at the 2012 Summer Olympics, Todd became the second oldest New Zealand Olympian in history.

In the 2013 New Year Honours, Todd was appointed a Knight Companion of the New Zealand Order of Merit for services to equestrian sport. His investiture at Buckingham Palace in May 2013 took place only days after the death of his father, Norm.

Todd was selected to represent New Zealand at the 2016 Summer Olympics. Once again he became the second oldest New Zealand Olympian in history, as the fellow equestrian Julie Brougham made her Olympic debut at the age of 62. At the Games held in Rio de Janeiro, Brazil, Todd finished 4th in the team competition and 7th individually. Todd was the last team member to compete in the jumping phase, however, he dropped four rails. As a result, New Zealand team missed out on a possible gold medal. Todd later described this outcome as one of the biggest lows of his career.

In 2019, Todd was an inaugural inductee into the Equestrian Sports New Zealand Hall of Fame.

=== Viral video ===
In February 2022, a two-year old video emerged of Todd hitting a horse with a tree branch at a training clinic. The horse had refused to enter a water obstacle, and Todd hit it ten times. Todd issued an apology after the video was published. The British Horseracing Authority (BHA) announced it was carrying out an investigation. In the interim, Todd was issued with a temporary suspension of his licence. Todd stepped down as a patron of the charity World Horse Welfare. Todd's training licence was returned to him on 14 April 2022 after an independent disciplinary panel issued him with a four month suspension with two months deferred, which meant that he had already served the eight-week suspension.

== Personal life ==
Todd married Carolyn Berry in 1986 and had two children, Lauren and James. They separated in 2009. The couple remarried in 2014, with only their children present as witnesses.

Todd's autobiography, So Far, So Good, was published in 1998. He has had several other books published including Charisma (1989), One Day Eventing, Mark Todd’s Cross-Country Handbook (1995) and Novice Eventing with Mark Todd (1996). He has also produced a series of training videos.

Awards
Preceded by Richard Hadlee	New Zealand's Sportsman of the Year; 1988	Succeeded by Richard Hadlee
Preceded by All Blacks	Halberg Awards – Supreme Award; 1988	Succeeded by Erin Baker
