= Lonsdale Cup (NZOC) =

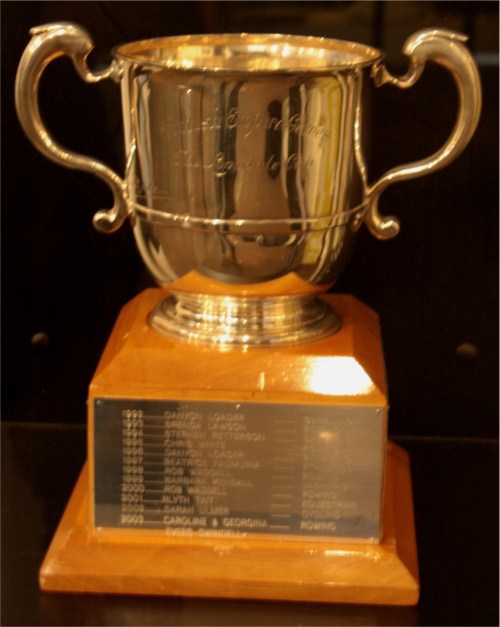
The Lonsdale Cup on display at the New Zealand Olympic Museum

The Lonsdale Cup is awarded annually by the New Zealand Olympic Committee (NZOC) to a New Zealand athlete (or team) who has demonstrated the most outstanding contribution to an Olympic or Commonwealth sport during the previous year.

The cup is a scale replica of the original Queen Anne cup of the same design presented by Lord Lonsdale during the 1911 Festival of Empire meeting. Originally won by Canada, it was subsequently given to the British Empire Games Federation to ensure its best use as an Empire Games trophy.

Due to its impractical size and the Federation deciding not to award such a trophy for the Games, the original was melted down in 1934, and smaller scale cups were given to the British Empire Games Associations in existence at the time.

It is on permanent display at the NZOC's New Zealand Olympic Museum, with athletes receiving a scale replica.

== Recipients ==
New Zealand's Lonsdale Cup has been awarded annually since 1961.

Year	Winner	Sport
1961	Murray Halberg	Athletics
1962	Peter Snell	Athletics
1963	Bill Baillie	Athletics
1964	Peter Snell	Athletics
1965	Don Oliver	Weightlifting
1966	Valerie Young	Athletics
1967	Dave McKenzie	Athletics
1968	Ian Ballinger	Shooting
1969	Jeff Julian	Athletics
1970	Harry Kent	Cycling
1971	Les Mills	Athletics
1972	Rod Dixon	Athletics
1973	Jack Foster	Athletics
1974	Dick Tayler	Athletics
1975	John Walker	Athletics
1976	Dick Quax	Athletics
1978	Rebecca Perrott	Swimming
1979	Ian Ferguson	Canoeing
1980	Anthony Cuff	Cycling
1981	David Barnes; Hamish Willcox	Yachting
1982	Neroli Fairhall	Archery
1983	David Barnes; Hamish Willcox	Yachting
1984	Ian Ferguson	Canoeing
1985	Ian Ferguson; Paul MacDonald	Canoeing
1986	Anthony Mosse	Swimming
1987	Paul MacDonald	Canoeing
1988	Bruce Kendall	Yachting
1989	Anthony Mosse	Swimming
1990	Gary Anderson	Cycling
1991	Anna Simcic	Swimming
1992	Danyon Loader	Swimming
1993	Brenda Lawson	Rowing
1994	Stephen Petterson	Shooting
1995	Chris White	Rowing
1996	Danyon Loader	Swimming
1997	Beatrice Faumuina	Athletics
1998	Rob Waddell	Rowing
1999	Barbara Kendall	Yachting
2000	Rob Waddell	Rowing
2001	Blyth Tait	Equestrian
2002	Sarah Ulmer	Cycling
2003	Caroline Evers-Swindell; Georgina Evers-Swindell	Rowing
2004	Sarah Ulmer	Cycling
2005	New Zealand rowing team	Rowing
2006	Valerie Vili	Athletics
2007	Valerie Vili	Athletics
2008	Caroline Evers-Swindell; Georgina Evers-Swindell	Rowing
2009	Mahé Drysdale	Rowing
2010	Silver Ferns	Netball
2011	Valerie Adams	Athletics
2012	Hamish Bond; Eric Murray	Rowing
2013	Valerie Adams	Athletics
2014	Valerie Adams	Athletics
2015	Lydia Ko	Golf
2016	Lisa Carrington	Canoeing
2017	Lisa Carrington	Canoeing
2018	Black Ferns sevens	Rugby sevens
2019	Silver Ferns	Netball
2020	Peter Burling; Blair Tuke	Sailing
2021	Lisa Carrington	Canoeing
2022	Zoi Sadowski-Synnott	Snowboarding
2023	Lisa Carrington	Canoeing
2024	Lydia Ko	Golf
2025	Hamish Kerr	Athletics
