= Paolo Carraro =

Italian sprint canoer (born 1964)

Paolo Carraro (born 17 January 1964) is an Italian sprint canoeist who competed in the mid-1980s. He was eliminated in the semifinals of the K-1 1000 m event at the 1984 Summer Olympics in Los Angeles.
