= Canoeing at the 1984 Summer Olympics – Men's K-4 1000 metres =

The men's K-4 1000 metres event was a fours kayaking event conducted as part of the Canoeing at the 1984 Summer Olympics program.

== Medalists ==
Gold	Silver	Bronze
New Zealand; Grant Bramwell; Ian Ferguson; Paul MacDonald; Alan Thompson	Sweden; Per-Inge Bengtsson; Tommy Karls; Lars-Erik Moberg; Thomas Ohlsson	France; François Barouh; Philippe Boccara; Pascal Boucherit; Didier Vavasseur

== Results ==
=== Heats ===
15 crews entered in two heats on August 7. The top three finishers from each of the heats advanced directly to the semifinals while the remaining nine teams were relegated to the repechages.

Heat 1
1.	Grant Bramwell, Ian Ferguson, Paul MacDonald, and Alan Thompson (NZL)	3:05.99	QS
2.	Ionel Constantin, Nicolae Fedosel, Ionel Letcae, and Angelin Velea (ROU)	3:06.97	QS
3.	Bernd Hessel, Oliver Kegel, Detlef Schmidt, and Reiner Scholl (FRG)	3:07.30	QS
4.	Don Brien, Mark Holmes, Don Irvine, and Colin Shaw (CAN)	3:08.07	QR
5.	Gennaro Cirillo, Vincenzo Damista, Marco Ganna, and Francesco Mandragona (ITA)	3:08.90	QR
6.	Finn Borchgrevink, Frank Johannesen, Geir Kvillum, and Arne Slettsjø (NOR)	3:10.93	QR
7.	Grayson Bourne, Andrew Sheriff, Kevin Smith, and Jeremy West (GBR)	3:21.05	QR
8.	Cheung Chak Chuen, Ng Hin Wan, Ng Tsuen Man, and Tang Kwok Cheung (HKG)	3:21.05	QR
Heat 2
1.	François Barouh, Philippe Boccara, Pascal Boucherit, and Didier Vavasseur (FRA)	3:06.57	QS
2.	John Doak, Robert Doak, Raymond Martin, and Scott Wooden (AUS)	3:08.32	QS
3.	Per-Inge Bengtsson, Tommy Karls, Lars-Erik Moberg, and Thomas Ohlsson (SWE)	3:08.33	QS
4.	Iván González, Luis Gregorio Ramos, Juan José Román, and Juan Manuel Sánchez (ESP)	3:11.41	QR
5.	Peter Ammann, Felix Buser, Marcel Eichenbeger, and Helmut Lehmann (SUI)	3:12.89	QR
6.	Veli-Pekka Harjola, Mikko Kolehmainen, Ilpo Nieminen, and Mika Savilahti (FIN)	3:13.17	QR
7.	Norman Bellingham, David Gilman, Dan Schnurrenberger, and Chris Spelius (USA)	3:15.77	QR

=== Repechages ===
Nine teams competed in two repechages on August 7. The top three finishers from each of the repechages advanced directly to the semifinals.

Repechage 1
1.	Don Brien, Mark Holmes, Don Irvine, and Colin Shaw (CAN)	3:16.52	QS
2.	Peter Ammann, Felix Buser, Marcel Eichenbeger, and Helmut Lehmann (SUI)	3:17.70	QS
3.	Finn Borchgrevink, Frank Johannesen, Geir Kvillum, and Arne Slettsjø (NOR)	3:18.04	QS
4.	Norman Bellingham, David Gilman, Dan Schnurrenberger, and Chris Spelius (USA)	3:19.72
5.	Cheung Chak Chuen, Ng Hin Wan, Ng Tsuen Man, and Tang Kwok Cheung (HKG)	3:46.92
Repechage 2
1.	Grayson Bourne, Andrew Sheriff, Kevin Smith, and Jeremy West (GBR)	3:18.67	QS
2.	Iván González, Luis Gregorio Ramos, Juan José Román, and Juan Manuel Sánchez (ESP)	3:21.87	QS
3.	Veli-Pekka Harjola, Mikko Kolehmainen, Ilpo Nieminen, and Mika Savilahti (FIN)	3:08.33	QS
4.	Gennaro Cirillo, Vincenzo Damista, Marco Ganna, and Francesco Mandragona (ITA)	Did not finish

Italy recorded a time of 48.45 at the 250 m mark which was in fourth, but did not finish.

=== Semifinals ===
The top three finishers in each of the semifinals (raced on August 9) advanced to the final.

Semifinal 1
1.	Grant Bramwell, Ian Ferguson, Paul MacDonald, and Alan Thompson (NZL)	3:05.67	QF
2.	Per-Inge Bengtsson, Tommy Karls, Lars-Erik Moberg, and Thomas Ohlsson (SWE)	3:06.78	QF
3.	Grayson Bourne, Andrew Sheriff, Kevin Smith, and Jeremy West (GBR)	3:07.52	QF
4.	Finn Borchgrevink, Frank Johannesen, Geir Kvillum, and Arne Slettsjø (NOR)	3:07.97
Semifinal 2
1.	François Barouh, Philippe Boccara, Pascal Boucherit, and Didier Vavasseur (FRA)	3:06.57	QF
2.	Iván González, Luis Gregorio Ramos, Juan José Román, and Juan Manuel Sánchez (ESP)	3:09.03	QF
3.	Bernd Hessel, Oliver Kegel, Detlef Schmidt, and Reiner Scholl (FRG)	3:09.65	QF
4.	Peter Ammann, Felix Buser, Marcel Eichenbeger, and Helmut Lehmann (SUI)	3:10.36
Semifinal 3
1.	Ionel Constantin, Nicolae Fedosel, Ionel Letcae, and Angelin Velea (ROU)	3:08.44	QF
2.	Don Brien, Mark Holmes, Don Irvine, and Colin Shaw (CAN)	3:09.10	QF
3.	John Doak, Robert Doak, Raymond Martin, and Scott Wooden (AUS)	3:09.98	QF
4.	Veli-Pekka Harjola, Mikko Kolehmainen, Ilpo Nieminen, and Mika Savilahti (FIN)	3:12.82

=== Final ===
The final was held on August 11.

Gold	Grant Bramwell, Ian Ferguson, Paul MacDonald, and Alan Thompson (NZL)	3:02.28
Silver	Per-Inge Bengtsson, Tommy Karls, Lars-Erik Moberg, and Thomas Ohlsson (SWE)	3:02.81
Bronze	François Barouh, Philippe Boccara, Pascal Boucherit, and Didier Vavasseur (FRA)	3:03.94
4.	Ionel Constantin, Nicolae Fedosel, Ionel Letcae, and Angelin Velea (ROU)	3:04.39
5.	Grayson Bourne, Andrew Sheriff, Kevin Smith, and Jeremy West (GBR)	3:04.59
6.	Iván González, Luis Gregorio Ramos, Juan José Román, and Juan Manuel Sánchez (ESP)	3:04.71
7.	John Doak, Robert Doak, Raymond Martin, and Scott Wooden (AUS)	3:06.02
8.	Bernd Hessel, Oliver Kegel, Detlef Schmidt, and Reiner Scholl (FRG)	3:06.47
9.	Don Brien, Mark Holmes, Don Irvine, and Colin Shaw (CAN)	3:06.66
