= Chris Spelius =

American sprint canoer (born 1951)

Chris Spelius (born September 10, 1951) is an American sprint canoer who competed in the mid-1980s. He was eliminated in the repechages of the K-4 1000 m event at the 1984 Summer Olympics in Los Angeles.
