= Mark Holmes (canoeist) =

Canadian canoeist

Personal information
- Born: October 28, 1965 (age 61) London, Ontario Canada
- Height: 180 cm (5 ft 11 in)
- Weight: 88 kg (194 lb)

Sport
- Country: Canada
- Sport: Canoe racing

Achievements and titles
- Olympic finals: 9th1984 Summer Olympics

Mark Holmes (born October 28, 1964) is a Canadian sprint canoer who competed in the mid-1980s. He finished ninth in the K-4 1000 m event at the 1984 Summer Olympics in Los Angeles.
