= Cheung Chak Chuen =

Hong Kong sprint canoer (born 1957)

Cheung Chak Chuen (born September 22, 1957) is a Hong Kong sprint canoer who competed in the mid-1980s. He was eliminated in the repechages of the K-4 1000 m event at the 1984 Summer Olympics in Los Angeles.
