= Marco Ganna =

Italian canoeist (born 1961)

Marco Ganna (born 14 December 1961) has been an Italian sprint canoer who competed in the mid-1980s. He did not finish in the repechages of the K-4 1000 m event at the 1984 Summer Olympics in Los Angeles. His son Filippo is a professional cyclist who rides for Netcompany–Ineos.
