= Adogon Adogon =

Ivorian canoeist

Adogon Adogon (sometimes listed as Adogon) is an Ivorian sprint canoer who competed in the mid-1980s. He was eliminated in the repechages of the K-1 1000 m event at the 1984 Summer Olympics in Los Angeles.
