= Gennaro Cirillo =

Italian sprint canoer (born 1961)

Gennaro Cirillo (born 2 September 1961) is an Italian sprint canoer who competed in the mid-1980s. He did not finish in the repechages of the K-4 1000 m event at the 1984 Summer Olympics in Los Angeles.
