= Frank Johannesen =

Norwegian sprint canoer (born 1959)

Frank Johannesen (born July 8, 1959) is a Norwegian sprint canoer who competed in the mid-1980s. He was eliminated in the semifinals of the K-4 1000 m event at the 1984 Summer Olympics in Los Angeles.
