= Veli-Pekka Harjola =

Finnish canoeist

Veli-Pekka Harjola (born 10 January 1963 in Helsinki) is a Finnish sprint canoeist who competed in the mid-1980s. He was eliminated in the semifinals of both the K-1 1000 m and the K-4 1000 m events at the 1984 Summer Olympics in Los Angeles.
