= Bernd Hessel =

German canoeist

Medal record

Men's canoe sprint

World Championships
Bronze medal – third place	1982 Belgrade	K-4 1000 m

Bernd Hessel (born 3 July 1961, in Munich) is a West German sprint canoer who competed in the early to mid-1980s. He won a bronze medal in the K-4 1000 m event at the 1982 ICF Canoe Sprint World Championships in Belgrade.

Hessel also finished eighth in the K-4 1000 m event at the 1984 Summer Olympics in Los Angeles.
