= Attila Császár =

Hungarian sprint canoer

Medal record

Men's canoe sprint

World Championships
Bronze medal – third place	1983 Tampere	K-4 500 m

Attila Császár (21 December 1958 – 3 May 2017) was a Hungarian sprint kayaker who competed in the early 1980s. He won a bronze medal in the K-4 500 m event at the 1983 ICF Kayak Sprint World Championships in Tampere.
