= Ireneusz Ciurzyński =

Polish canoeist

Medal record

Men's canoe sprint

World Championships
Bronze medal – third place	1983 Tampere	K-4 10000 m

Ireneusz Ciurzyński is a Polish sprint canoer who competed in the mid-1980s. He won a bronze medal in the K-4 10000 m at the 1983 ICF Canoe Sprint World Championships in Tampere.
