= Vincenzo Damista =

Italian sprint canoer (born 1963)

Vincenzo Damista (born 7 June 1963) is an Italian sprint canoeist who competed in the mid-1980s. He did not finish in the repechages of the K-4 1000 m event at the 1984 Summer Olympics in Los Angeles.
