= Lars-Erik Moberg =

Swedish canoeist (born 1957)

Medal record

Men's canoe sprint

Olympic Games
Silver medal – second place	1984 Los Angeles	K-1 500 m
Silver medal – second place	1984 Los Angeles	K-2 500 m
Silver medal – second place	1984 Los Angeles	K-4 1000 m

World Championships
Gold medal – first place	1982 Belgrade	K-4 1000 m
Gold medal – first place	1985 Mechelen	K-4 1000 m
Silver medal – second place	1981 Nottingham	K-4 500 m
Silver medal – second place	1987 Duisburg	K-4 1000 m
Bronze medal – third place	1981 Nottingham	K-1 500 m
Bronze medal – third place	1982 Belgrade	K-1 500 m
Bronze medal – third place	1982 Belgrade	K-4 500 m
Bronze medal – third place	1985 Mechelen	K-4 500 m

Lars-Erik Moberg (born August 7, 1957, in Katrineholm) is a Swedish sprint canoer who competed in the 1980s. Competing in three Summer Olympics, he won three silver medals at Los Angeles in 1984 by earning them in the K-1 500 m, K-2 500 m, and K-4 500 m events.

Möberg also won eight medals at the ICF Canoe Sprint World Championships with two golds (K-4 1000 m: 1982, 1985), two silvers (K-4 500 m: 1981, K-4 1000 m: 1987), and four bronzes (K-1 500 m: 1982, 1983; K-4 500 m: 1982, 1985).
