= Krzysztof Szczepański =

Polish canoeist

Personal information
- Born: 13 February 1960 (age 66) Bydgoszcz, Poland

Sport
- Sport: Canoe sprint
Medal record
Representing Poland
World Championships
Bronze medal – third place	1983 Tampere	K-4 10000 m
Summer Universiade
Silver medal – second place	1987 Zagreb	K-4 1000 m

Krzysztof Szczepański (born 13 February 1960) is a Polish sprint canoer who competed in the mid-1980s. He won a bronze medal in the K-4 10000 m at the 1983 ICF Canoe Sprint World Championships in Tampere.
