= Fiodor Gurei =

Romanian canoeist

Medal record

Men's canoe sprint

World Championships
Bronze medal – third place	1983 Tampere	C-2 500 m

Fiodor Gurei is a Romanian sprint canoer who competed in the early 1980s. He won a bronze medal in the C-2 500 m event at the 1983 ICF Canoe Sprint World Championships in Tampere, Finland.
