= Rick Daman =

Dutch canoeist

Medal record

Men's canoe sprint

World Championships
Bronze medal – third place	1983 Tampere	K-1 10000 m

Rick Daman is a Dutch sprint canoeist who competed in the early 1980s. He won a bronze medal in the K-1 10000 m event at the 1983 ICF Canoe Sprint World Championships in Tampere.
