= Pedro Alegre =

Spanish sprint canoer

Personal information
- Full name: Pedro Alegre Arrizabalaga
- Nationality: Spanish
- Born: 15 August 1961 (age 64) Irun, Gipuzkoa, Spain

Pedro Alegre Arrizabalaga (Note: In this Spanish name, the first or paternal surname is Alegre and the second or maternal family name is Arrizabalaga.) (born 15 August 1961 in Irun, Gipuzkoa) is a Spanish sprint canoer who competed in the mid-1980s. He finished ninth in the K-1 1000 m event at the 1984 Summer Olympics in Los Angeles.
