= Angelin Velea =

Romanian canoeist (born 1963)

Personal information
- Born: 1 April 1963 (age 63) Tulcea, Tulcea County, Romania

Sport
- Sport: Canoe sprint
Medal record
Representing Romania
World Championships
Gold medal – first place	1983 Tampere	K-4 1000 m
Gold medal – first place	1986 Montreal	K-2 1000 m
Bronze medal – third place	1986 Montreal	K-2 10000 m
Summer Universiade
Gold medal – first place	1987 Zagreb	K-2 500 m
Silver medal – second place	1987 Zagreb	K-2 1000 m

Angelin Velea (born 1 April 1963) is a Romanian sprint canoeist who competed in the mid to late 1980s. He won three medals at the ICF Canoe Sprint World Championships with two golds (K-2 1000 m: 1986, K-4 1000 m: 1983) and a bronze (K-2 10000 m: 1986).

Velea also competed in two Summer Olympics, earning his best finish of fourth in the K-4 1000 m at Los Angeles in 1984.
