= Ionel Constantin =

Romanian sprint canoer

Personal information
- Born: 6 May 1963 (age 63) Brăila, Brăila County, Romania

Sport
- Sport: Canoe sprint
Medal record
World Championships
Gold medal – first place	1983 Tampere	K-4 1000 m
Silver medal – second place	1986 Montreal	K-4 10000 m
Summer Universiade
Bronze medal – third place	1987 Zagreb	K-4 1000 m

Ionel Constantin (born 6 May 1963) is a Romanian sprint canoeist who competed in the mid-1980s. He won two medals at the ICF Canoe Sprint World Championships with a gold (K-4 1000 m: 1983) and a silver (K-4 10000 m: 1986).

Constantin also finished fourth in the K-4 1000 m event at the 1984 Summer Olympics in Los Angeles.
