= 1983 ICF Canoe Sprint World Championships =

The 1983 ICF Canoe Sprint World Championships were held in Tampere, Finland for the second time. The Finnish city had host the championships previously in 1973.

The men's competition consisted of six Canadian (single paddle, open boat) and nine kayak events. Three events were held for the women, all in kayak.

This was the eighteenth championships in canoe sprint.

== Medal summary ==
=== Men's ===
==== Canoe ====
Event	Gold	Time	Silver	Time	Bronze	Time
C-1 500 m	Costică Olaru (ROU)		Ulrich Papke (GDR)		Anatoliy Volkov (URS)	
C-1 1000 m	Vassily Beresa (URS)		Costică Olaru (ROU)		Jiří Vrdlovec (TCH)	
C-1 10000 m	Jiří Vrdlovec (TCH)		Gheorghe Titu (ROU)		Tamás Wichmann (HUN)	
C-2 500 m	Yugoslavia; Matija Ljubek; Mirko Nišović		Soviet Union; Ivan Klementiev; Sergey Ossadzhiy		Romania; Dumitru Bețiu; Fiodor Gurei	
C-2 1000 m	Romania; Ivan Patzaichin; Toma Simionov		East Germany; Olaf Heukrodt; Alexander Schuck		Yugoslavia; Matija Ljubek; Mirko Nišović	
C-2 10000 m	Hungary; Tamás Buday; László Vaskúti		Romania; Ivan Patzaichin; Toma Simionov		Soviet Union; Sergey Petrenko; Yuriy Laptikov	

==== Kayak ====
Event	Gold	Time	Silver	Time	Bronze	Time
K-1 500 m	Vladimir Parfenovich (URS)		Ian Ferguson (NZL)		Andreas Stähle (GDR)	
K-1 1000 m	Rüdiger Helm (GDR)		Artūras Vieta (URS)		Alan Thompson (NZL)	
K-1 10000 m	Einar Rasmussen (NOR)		Milan Janić (YUG)		Rick Daman (NED)	
K-2 500 m	East Germany; Frank Fischer; André Wohllebe		Soviet Union; Vladimir Parfenovich; Sergey Superata		Canada; Hugh Fisher; Alwyn Morris	
K-2 1000 m	East Germany; Frank Fischer; André Wohllebe		Soviet Union; Vladimir Parfenovich; Sergey Superata		Austria; Werner Bachmeyer; Wolfgang Hartl	
K-2 10000 m	Great Britain; Stephen Jackson; Alan Williams		Hungary; István Szabó; István Tóth		Sweden; Bengt Andersson; Karl-Axel Sundqvist	
K-4 500 m	East Germany; Andreas Stähle; Peter Hempel; Harald Marg; Rüdiger Helm		Soviet Union; Sergey Kolokolov; Sergei Chukhray; Artūras Vieta; Aleksandr Vodovatov		Hungary; István Imai; Attila Császár; Zoltán Lorinczy; András Rajna	
K-4 1000 m	Romania; Ionel Constantin; Nicolae Feodosei; Ionel Letcae; Angelin Velea		East Germany; Andreas Stähle; Peter Hempel; Rüdiger Helm; Harald Marg		Soviet Union; Sergey Kolokolov; Sergei Chukhray; Artūras Vieta; Aleksandr Vodovatov	
K-4 10000 m	Soviet Union; Nikolay Astapkovich; Aleksandr Avdeyev; Nikolay Baranov; Alexander Yermilov		Norway; Harald Amudsen; Geir Kvillum; Lars Ivar Gran; Arne Sletsjøe		Poland; Ireneusz Ciurzyński; Andrzej Klimaszewski; Ryszard Oborski; Krzysztof Szczepański	

=== Women's ===
==== Kayak ====
Event	Gold	Time	Silver	Time	Bronze	Time
K-1 500 m	Birgit Fischer (GDR)		Vania Gesheva (BUL)		Maria Ştefan (ROU)	
K-2 500 m	East Germany; Birgit Fischer; Carsta Kühn		Hungary; Katalin Povázsán; Erika Géczi		Sweden; Agneta Andersson; Susanne Wiberg	
K-4 500 m	East Germany; Birgit Fischer; Carsta Kühn; Ramona Walther; Kathrin Giese		Soviet Union; Inna Zhipulina; Nelli Yefremova; Natalya Kalasnikova; Galina Alekseyeva		Romania; Tecia Borzanea; Agafia Burhaev; Natasia Ionescu; Maria Ştefan	

== Medals table ==
Rank	Nation	Gold	Silver	Bronze	Total
1	East Germany (GDR)	7	3	1	11
2	Soviet Union (URS)	3	6	3	12
3	Romania (ROU)	3	3	3	9
4	Hungary (HUN)	1	2	2	5
5	Yugoslavia (YUG)	1	1	1	3
6	Norway (NOR)	1	1	0	2
7	Czechoslovakia (TCH)	1	0	1	2
8	Great Britain (GBR)	1	0	0	1
9	New Zealand (NZL)	0	1	1	2
10	Bulgaria (BUL)	0	1	0	1
11	Sweden (SWE)	0	0	2	2
12	Austria (AUT)	0	0	1	1
12	Canada (CAN)	0	0	1	1
12	Netherlands (NED)	0	0	1	1
12	Poland (POL)	0	0	1	1
Totals (15 entries)		18	18	18	54
