= Marcel Eichenberger =

Swiss canoeist

Marcel Eichenberger (born 27 January 1960) is a Swiss sprint canoer who competed in the mid-1980s. He was eliminated in the semifinals of the K-4 1000 m event at the 1984 Summer Olympics in Los Angeles.
