= Anthony Mosse =

New Zealand swimmer

Anthony Mosse MBE
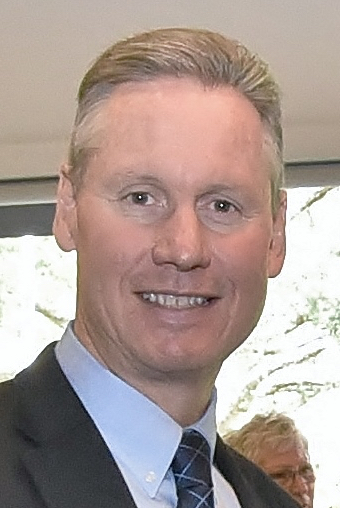
- Mosse in 2017

Personal information
- Full name: Anthony Robin Le Clerc Mosse
- Nationality: New Zealander
- Born: 29 October 1964 (age 61) Hong Kong
- Height: 1.84 m (6 ft 0 in)
- Weight: 77 kg (170 lb)

Sport
- Country: New Zealand
- Sport: Swimming
- Event: Butterfly
- College team: Stanford University
Medal record
Men's swimming
Representing New Zealand
Olympic Games
Bronze medal – third place	1988 Seoul	200 m butterfly
World Championships (LC)
Silver medal – second place	1986 Madrid	200 m butterfly
Pan Pacific Championships
Gold medal – first place	1985 Tokyo	200 m butterfly
Bronze medal – third place	1989 Tokyo	200 m butterfly
Commonwealth Games
Gold medal – first place	1986 Edinburgh	200 m butterfly
Gold medal – first place	1990 Auckland	200 m butterfly
Silver medal – second place	1986 Edinburgh	100 m butterfly
Bronze medal – third place	1990 Auckland	4x200 m freestyle
Summer Universiade
Gold medal – first place	1987 Zagreb	200 m butterfly
Silver medal – second place	1985 Kobe	200 m butterfly
Silver medal – second place	1987 Zagreb	100 m butterfly
Bronze medal – third place	1983 Edmonton	200 m butterfly

Anthony Robin Le Clerc Mosse MBE (born 29 October 1964 in Hong Kong) is a former New Zealand swimmer who competed at two Summer Olympic Games and three Commonwealth Games. He won one Olympic bronze medal, as well as two gold medals, one silver and one bronze at the Commonwealth Games.

== Biography ==
Mosse was the standard bearer for New Zealand competitive swimming through the 1980s. He swam at his first Commonwealth Games, in Brisbane, Australia in 1982, when he was 17. At the 1983 Summer Universiade in Edmonton, Mosse won a bronze medal in the 200-metre butterfly. He also finished 5th in the 100-metre butterfly. At the Los Angeles Olympics, he made the final in his two butterfly events.

At the 1985 Summer Universiade in Kobe, Mosse won a silver medal in the 200-metre butterfly. He also finished 5th in the 100-metre butterfly At the 1986 Commonwealth Games in Edinburgh, Scotland, he won gold and silver and in the same year was second in the 200m butterfly final at the World Championships. At the 1987 Summer Universiade in Zagreb, Mosse won a gold medal in the 200-metre butterfly, and a silver medal in the 100-metre butterfly. Mosse developed his career in the United States but continued to swim for New Zealand, gaining a bronze medal at the 1988 Olympics in Seoul, Korea. He rounded out his career when he won the 200m butterfly at the 1990 Commonwealth Games in Auckland.

Mosse gained a BA (Hons) from Stanford University in 1989 and later completed an MBA at the same university. He and his American wife have two children. He is now a merchant banker in San Francisco, but continues to be involved in swimming and is a regular commentator for TVNZ (including Beijing, 2008).

In the 1989 Queen's Birthday Honours, Mosse was appointed a Member of the Order of the British Empire, for services to swimming.

== See also ==
- List of Commonwealth Games medallists in swimming (men)
- List of Olympic medalists in swimming (men)

Awards
Preceded by Ian Ferguson and Paul MacDonald	Lonsdale Cup of the New Zealand Olympic Committee; 1986; 1989	Succeeded by Paul MacDonald
Preceded by Bruce Kendall	Lonsdale Cup of the New Zealand Olympic Committee; 1986; 1989	Succeeded by Gary Anderson
