= Ian Ballinger =

New Zealand sport shooter (1925–2008)

Personal information
- Full name: Ian Roy Ballinger
- Born: 21 October 1925 New Plymouth, New Zealand
- Died: 24 December 2008 (aged 83) Christchurch, New Zealand
Medal record
Men's shooting
Representing New Zealand
Olympic Games
Bronze medal – third place	1968 Mexico	Small-bore Rifle - Prone

Ian Roy Ballinger (21 October 1925 – 24 December 2008) was a New Zealand shooter who won a bronze medal at the 1968 Summer Olympics. Ballinger competed at three consecutive Olympic Games (1968, 1972 and 1976) and two Commonwealth Games (1974 and 1978) in the 50m Rifle - prone event.

He was awarded the Lonsdale Cup by the New Zealand Olympic Committee in 1968, and the following year he won the Ballinger Belt (named for his great-uncle, turn-of-the-century shooting champion Arthur Ballinger) at the New Zealand rifle shooting championships.

Awards
Preceded by Dave McKenzie	Lonsdale Cup of the New Zealand Olympic Committee; 1968	Succeeded by Jeff Julian
