= St Vincent's College Ashfield =

Coordinates: 33.8852°S 151.1249°E

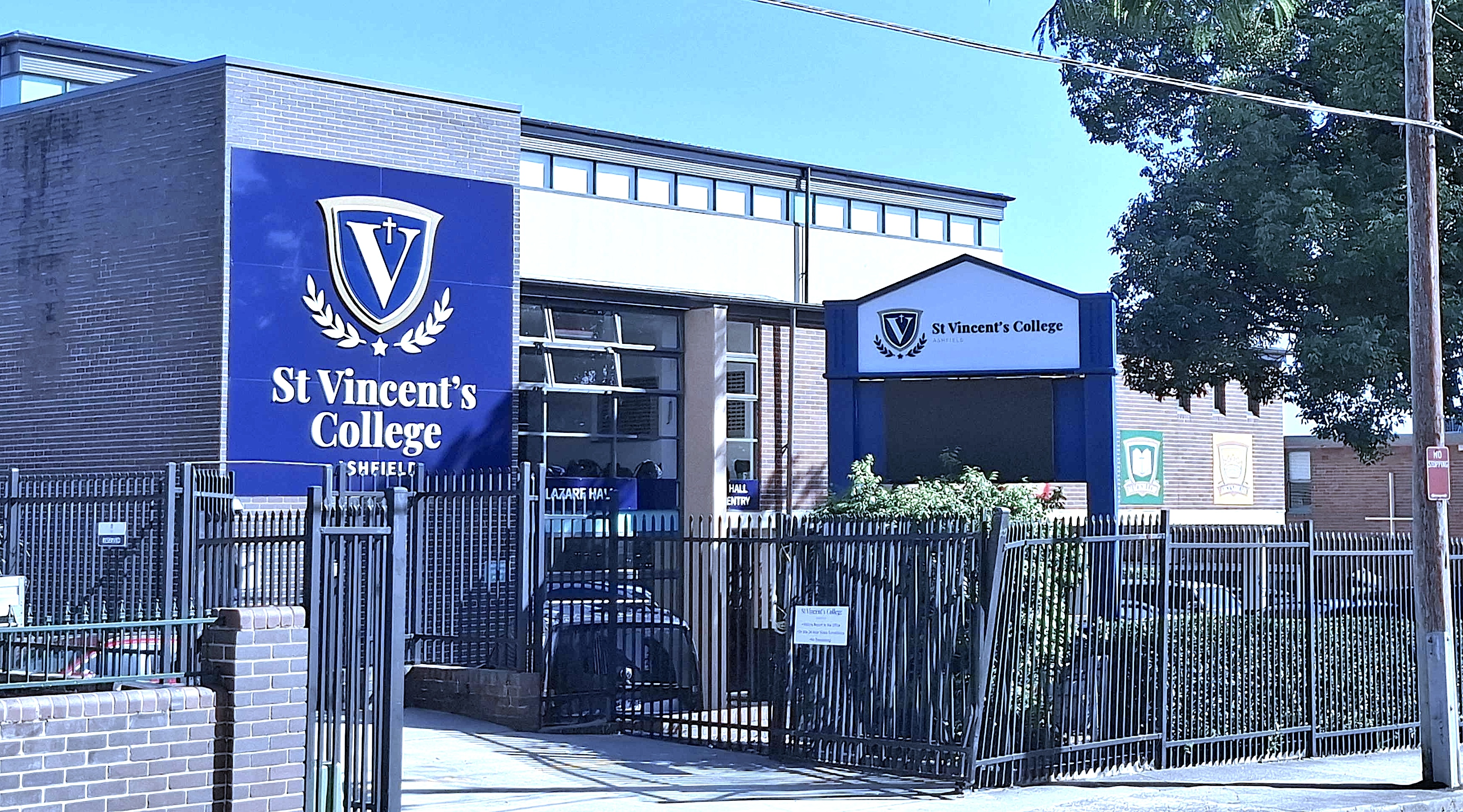
- Bland St exit of St Vincent's College Ashfield, pictured in March 2026
- 2131

Information
- Former name: Bethlehem College, Ashfield; De La Salle College Ashfield
- Motto: Latin: Ecclesia in Mundum (Church to the World)
- Denomination: Roman Catholic
- Established: 20 December 2022 (predecessor schools closed)
- Principal: Raymond "Ray" Martin
- Enrollment: 1039 (2023)
- Language: Australian English
- Campus: Suburban
- Website: svcashfield.syd.catholic.edu.au

St Vincent's College Ashfield is a Roman Catholic co-educational K-12 school located in Ashfield, New South Wales in the Inner West of Sydney, Australia. The college operates within the Sydney Catholic Schools system and provides education from Kindergarten to Year 12. It was established in 2023 through the amalgamation of three neighbouring Catholic schools: Bethlehem College, De La Salle College and St Vincent’s Catholic Primary School. The merger created a single co-educational K-12 institution on the existing Ashfield campus sites.

Prior to the amalgamation, Rosebank College was the only major co-educational Catholic secondary school in the Inner West region of Sydney. Until 2022, many Catholic secondary schools in the area operated as single-sex institutions, including De La Salle College (boys) and Bethlehem College (girls). The creation of St Vincent’s College Ashfield followed increasing demand in the region for co-educational Catholic schooling similar to that offered by Rosebank College. As of 2023, it was reported that the school had 1039 students.

The changes occurred alongside other structural reforms within Catholic education in Sydney. In 2022, St Mary's Cathedral College announced plans to transition from a single-sex boys school to a co-educational model. During this period of restructuring, new school branding and uniforms were designed and supplied by the Ranier schoolwear design group, which also designed the uniforms for the new St Vincent's College.
