= Don Doak =

Australian rugby league footballer and administrator

Personal information
- Full name: Don Doak
- Born: 1942
- Died: 1 October 1989 (aged 46–47)

Playing information
- Position: Prop, Hooker
Club
Years	Team	Pld	T	G	FG	P
1961–67	North Sydney	79	2	0	0	6

Don Doak (1942 – 1 October 1989) was an Australian former rugby league footballer who played in the 1960s. He played for North Sydney in the New South Wales Rugby League (NSWRL) competition.

== Playing career ==
Doak began his first grade career with North Sydney in 1961. In his first 3 seasons at the club, Norths missed out on the finals. In 1964, North Sydney finished fourth on the table and qualified for the finals. Doak played in the club's 11-9 semi-final defeat against Balmain at the Sydney Cricket Ground.

The following year, Norths enjoyed one of their best ever seasons finishing second on the table. North Sydney were defeated in the semi-final by St. George 47-7 but still qualified for the preliminary final the following week against South Sydney which Norths lost 14–9. Doak featured in both finals games for the club.

Doak played two further seasons for Norths and left the club at the end of the 1967 season.
