= Thomas Ohlsson =

Swedish sprint canoer (born 1958)

Medal record

Men's canoe sprint

Olympic Games
Silver medal – second place	1984 Los Angeles	K-4 1000 m

World Championships
Gold medal – first place	1982 Belgrade	K-4 1000 m
Silver medal – second place	1981 Nottingham	K-4 500 m
Bronze medal – third place	1982 Belgrade	K-4 500 m

Thomas Ohlsson (born 20 September 1958) is a Swedish sprint canoer who competed from the late 1970s to the mid-1980s. Competing in two Summer Olympics, he won a silver medal in the K-4 1000 m event at Los Angeles in 1984. Ohlsson's wife, Eva Karlsson, won a silver medal in the K-4 500 m event at those same games.

He also won a complete set of medals at the ICF Canoe Sprint World Championships with a gold (K-4 1000 m: 1982), a silver (K-4 500 m: 1981), and a bronze (K-4 500 m: 1982).
