= Maria Ștefan =

Romanian canoe sprinter (born 1954)

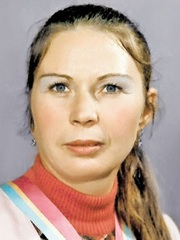

Personal information
- Born: 16 February 1954 (age 72) Jurilovca, Romania
- Height: 170 cm (5 ft 7 in)
- Weight: 63 kg (139 lb)

Sport
- Sport: Canoe sprint
- Club: Danubiu Tulcea; CS Dinamo București
Medal record
Representing Romania
Olympic Games
Gold medal – first place	1984 Los Angeles	K-4 500 m
World Championships
Bronze medal – third place	1981 Nottingham	K-2 500 m
Bronze medal – third place	1983 Tampere	K-1 500 m
Bronze medal – third place	1983 Tampere	K-4 500 m

Maria Ştefan (later Mihoreanu, and Cosma, born 16 February 1954) is a retired Romanian canoe sprinter who competed at the 1976, 1980 and 1984 Olympics. She won a gold medal in the K-4 500 m event in 1984 and placed fourth-fifth in the singles in 1976 and 1980. She won three bronze medals at the ICF Canoe Sprint World Championships, one each in the K-1 500 m (1983), the K-2 500 m (1981), and the K-4 500 m (1983) events. Her sister-in-law Maria Nichiforov is also a former Olympic canoer.
