= Don Irvine (canoeist) =

Canadian canoeist (born 1954)

Don Irvine (born September 26, 1954 in Calgary) is a Canadian sprint canoer who competed in the mid-1980s. He finished ninth in the K-4 1000 m event at the 1984 Summer Olympics in Los Angeles.
