= Per-Inge Bengtsson =

Swedish sprint canoer (born 1961)

Medal record

Men's canoe sprint

Olympic Games
Silver medal – second place	1984 Los Angeles	K-2 500 m
Silver medal – second place	1984 Los Angeles	K-4 1000 m

World Championships
Gold medal – first place	1982 Belgrade	K-4 1000 m
Gold medal – first place	1985 Mechelen	K-4 1000 m
Silver medal – second place	1981 Nottingham	K-4 500 m
Silver medal – second place	1987 Duisburg	K-4 1000 m
Bronze medal – third place	1982 Belgrade	K-4 500 m
Bronze medal – third place	1985 Mechelen	K-4 500 m
Bronze medal – third place	1987 Duisburg	K-2 500 m

Per-Inge Bengtsson (born 29 October 1961) is a Swedish sprint canoer who competed in the 1980s. Competing in two Summer Olympics, he won two silver medals at Los Angeles in 1984, earning them in the K-2 500 m and K-4 1000 m events.

Bengtsson also won seven medals at the ICF Canoe Sprint World Championships with two golds (K-4 1000 m: 1982, 1985), two silvers (K-4 500 m: 1981, K-4 1000 m: 1987), and three bronzes (K-2 500 m: 1987, K-4 500 m: 1982, 1985).
