= Doakes =

Doakes is a surname. Notable people and characters with the surname include:

- Mary Doakes (1936–2019), African-American schoolteacher
- James Doakes, fictional character from the television and book series Dexter
- Joe Doakes, placeholder personal name in American English

== See also ==
- Michael Dokes (1958–2012), American professional boxer
