= John Doak (canoeist) =

Australian sprint canoeist

John Doak (26 March 1959 – 31 March 2021) was an Australian sprint canoeist who competed in the mid-1980s. He finished seventh in the K-4 1000 m event at the 1984 Summer Olympics in Los Angeles.
