= Destiny of Ancient Kingdoms =

2016 video game

- Developer: Utopia Dream Entertainment Alliance
- Publisher: ZAF: Utopia Dream Entertainment Alliance.
- Platform: Windows
- Release: 2016
- Genre: Fantasy MMORPG
- Mode: Multiplayer

Destiny of Ancient Kingdoms more commonly known as DOAK, is the first South African free-to-play massively multiplayer online role-playing game (MMORPG) to be released on Steam. DOAK was created with the purpose of giving South Africans a PC game that they can truly call their own. Destiny of Ancient Kingdoms was developed and distributed by Utopia Dream Entertainment Alliance (UDEA) in South Africa. The story for Destiny of Ancient Kingdoms begins in a prehistoric age after Giants and Gods battled each other to decide the fate of the world. The game is currently shut down, along with the primary website.

== Development ==
The open beta was made available to the public on 5 December 2015, with one server available “Utopia-1” that offers a combined PvE and PvP orientated experience. Destiny of Ancient Kingdoms was then made available to the public on 28 February 2016.

After receiving a rating from the Film and Publication Board of South Africa, UDEA launched Destiny of Ancient Kingdoms on Steam. After three weeks on Steam Greenlight, the game was approved by the Steam community and was officially released on 30 August 2016.

Destiny of Ancient Kingdom's release on STEAM was covered by a single international website posting reviews and articles about the game in many different languages.
