= Robert Doak =

Australian sprint canoeist

Robert Doak (born 6 January 1958) is an Australian sprint canoeist who competed in the mid-1980s. He finished seventh in the K-4 1000 m event at the 1984 Summer Olympics in Los Angeles.
