= Tommy Karls =

Swedish sprint and marathon canoeist (born 1961)

Medal record

Representing Sweden

Men's canoe sprint

Olympic Games
Silver medal – second place	1984 Los Angeles	K-4 1000 m

Canoe Sprint World Championships
Silver medal – second place	1985 Mechelen	K-4 10000 m

Men's canoe marathon

Canoe Marathon World Championships
Bronze medal – third place	1992 Brisbane	K-2 marathon

Sven Tommy Karls (born October 13, 1961) is a Swedish sprint and marathon canoeist who competed in the 1980s. He won a silver medal in the K-4 1000 m event at the 1984 Summer Olympics in Los Angeles.

Karls also won a silver medal in the K-4 10000 m event at the 1985 ICF Canoe Sprint World Championships in Mechelen.
