= Didier Vavasseur =

French sprint canoer (born 1961)

Olympic medal record

Men's canoe sprint
Bronze medal – third place	1984 Los Angeles	K-4 1000 m

Didier Vavasseur (born 7 February 1961) is a French sprint canoeist.

== Career ==
Vavasseur competed in the 1980s. Participating in two Summer Olympics, he won a bronze medal in the K-4 1000 m event at Los Angeles in 1984.
