= Bethlehem College, Ashfield =

Bethlehem College

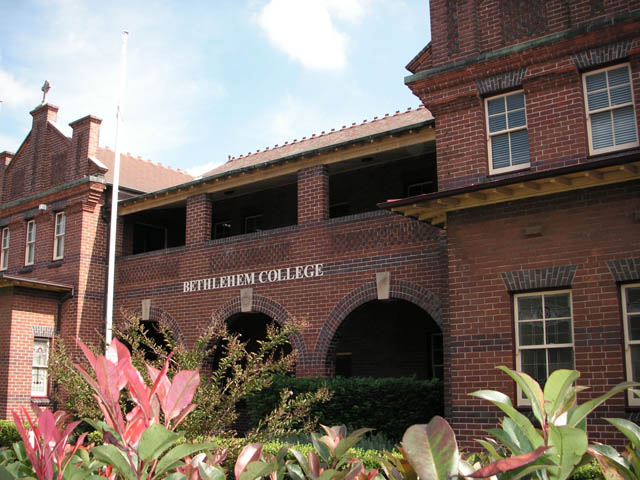
- Bethlehem College, pictured in 2007

Location
- Ashfield, New South Wales; Australia; 33°53′6″S 151°7′28″E

Information
- Former name: Bethlehem Ladies College
- Type: Independent comprehensive single-sex secondary day school
- Motto: Latin: Este Fideles (Be faithful)
- Denomination: Roman Catholic
- Established: 26 January 1881
- Status: Closed
- Closed: 20 December 2022
- Oversight: Catholic Education Office, Archdiocese of Sydney
- Principal: Ann Freeman
- Employees: ~75
- Years: 7–12
- Gender: Girls
- Enrolment: c. 534 (2021)
- Language: Australian English
- Colours: Purple and navy blue
- Slogan: Este Fideles
- Website: bcashfield.catholic.edu.au

Bethlehem College was an Independent Roman Catholic comprehensive single-sex secondary day school for girls, located in Bland Street, Ashfield, the Inner West of Sydney, New South Wales, Australia. The college was founded in 1881 by the Sisters of Charity. In 2022, the school announced plans to amalgamate with the adjacent boys' high school, De La Salle College Ashfield, and St Vincent's Primary School, due to increasing demand for co-educational schools in inner Sydney. Since 2023, the former campus does not exist as an independent school but remains a campus of the co-educational college St Vincent's College Ashfield, that was formed in the amalgamation.

== History under the Sisters of Charity ==
The college was founded in 1881. In the early twentieth century one of the college's Principal was Dorothy Josephine Bruton who was known as Sister Dympna.

== Notable alumnae ==
- Monica Attard – journalist, ABC News and current affairs journalist, presenter of Media Watch; awarded an Order of Australia for excellence in journalism
- Geraldine Brooks – author and journalist; Pulitzer Prize winner for her novel March, author of Year of Wonders and many other books, previously political correspondent for the Wall Street Journal in Bosnia, Somalia and the Middle East
- Angela D'Amore – politician; elected as a member of the New South Wales Legislative Assembly, Member for Drummoyne
- Deirdre O'Connor – Federal Court judge
- Marcia Ralston – actress
- Debbie Spillane – sports journalist and broadcaster

== See also ==
- List of Catholic schools in New South Wales
- Catholic education in Australia
