= Pascal Boucherit =

French sprint canoer

Medal record

Men's canoe sprint

Olympic Games
Bronze medal – third place	1984 Los Angeles	K-4 1000 m

World Championships
Gold medal – first place	1985 Mechelen	K-2 1000 m
Gold medal – first place	1987 Duisburg	K-2 10000 m
Gold medal – first place	1991 Paris	K-2 10000 m
Silver medal – second place	1987 Duisburg	K-2 1000 m

Pascal Boucherit (born 7 August 1959) is a French canoe sprinter who competed from the mid-1980s to the early 1990s. Competing in three Summer Olympics, he won a bronze medal in the K-4 1000 m event at Los Angeles in 1984.

Boucherit also won four medals at the ICF Canoe Sprint World Championships with three golds (K-2 1000 m: 1985, K-2 10000 m: 1987, 1991) and a silver (K-2 1000 m: 1987).
