= François Barouh =

French canoeist (born 1955)

Olympic medal record

Men's canoe sprint
| Bronze medal – third place | 1984 Los Angeles | K-4 1000 m |

François Barouh (born 16 January 1955) is a French sprint canoer. He competed from the late 1970s to the mid-1980s.

Competing in two Summer Olympics, Barouh won a bronze medal in the K-4 1000 m event at Los Angeles in 1984.
