= Ian Ferguson (canoeist) =

New Zealand canoeist (born 1952)

Ian Ferguson MBE
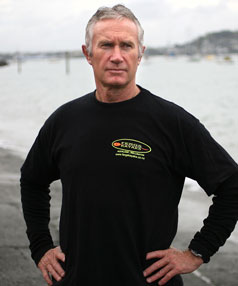

Personal information
- Full name: Ian Gordon Ferguson
- Nickname: Ferg
- Born: 20 July 1952 (age 74) Taumarunui, New Zealand
- Relative: Steven Ferguson (son)

Sport
- Country: New Zealand
- Sport: Canoe racing
- Event: canoe sprint
- Partner: Paul MacDonald

Achievements and titles
- Olympic finals: 1980, 1984, 1988, 1992
Medal record
Men's canoe sprint
Representing New Zealand
Olympic Games
Gold medal – first place	1984 Los Angeles	K-1 500 m
Gold medal – first place	1984 Los Angeles	K-2 500 m
Gold medal – first place	1984 Los Angeles	K-4 1000 m
Gold medal – first place	1988 Seoul	K-2 500 m
Silver medal – second place	1988 Seoul	K-2 1000 m
World Championships
Gold medal – first place	1985 Mechelen	K-2 500 m
Gold medal – first place	1987 Duisburg	K-2 1000 m
Silver medal – second place	1983 Tampere	K-1 500 m
Silver medal – second place	1987 Duisburg	K-2 500 m
Silver medal – second place	1990 Poznań	K-2 10000 m

Ian Gordon Ferguson MBE (born 20 July 1952) is New Zealand's second most successful Olympian. He won four Olympic gold medals competing in K1, K2, and K4 kayak events, and attended five Summer Olympics between 1976 and 1992. He also won two canoe sprint world championship titles.

== Early life and family ==
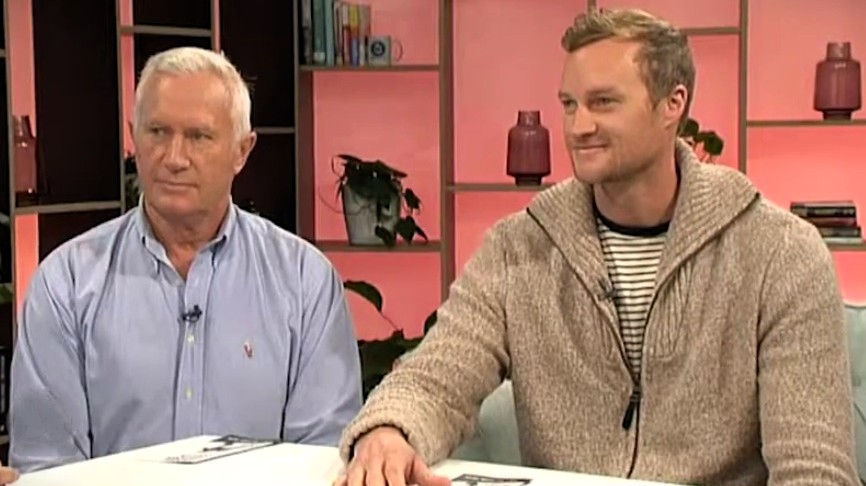
Left to right: Ferguson, son, Olympic swimmer and canoeist Steven Ferguson, in 2016

Ferguson was born in Taumarunui on 20 July 1952, the son of Gilbert and Winsome Ferguson. He was educated at Palmerston North Boys' High School, and was an all-round sportsperson, achieving in running and rugby union, and becoming the school swimming champion. Ferguson studied at Victoria University of Wellington, completing a Bachelor of Commerce and Administration degree in 1976.

In 1973, Ferguson married his wife, Alyson, and the couple went on to have two children.

== Sporting career and honours ==
At the 1984 Olympic Games in Los Angeles he won three gold medals. In the same year he was named New Zealand sportsperson of the year.

In the 1985 New Year Honours, Ferguson was appointed a Member of the Order of the British Empire, for services to canoeing.

New Zealand's flagbearer at the opening ceremony of the 1988 Summer Olympics, he went on to win another gold medal and a silver medal at that Olympic Games in Seoul, South Korea. He was the first New Zealander to compete in five Olympic Games and his four gold medals was the New Zealand record for an individual haul at the Games until beaten by fellow canoeist Lisa Carrington in 2021. His five Olympic medals is the second-highest number of Olympic medals won by a New Zealander, a record he shares with fellow canoeist Paul MacDonald and equestrian Mark Todd.

== Post professional sports ==
In 1990 Ferguson started a kayak retail and hire business named Ferg's Kayaks.

Ferguson also starred in the NZ TV show Clash of the Codes, having been in the winning team on two occasions.

In 2009, Ferguson began fronting a campaign to build an international whitewater canoeing stadium in Manukau City. Vector Wero Whitewater Park was opened in 2016, with Ferguson as general manager.

Ferguson's son, Steven Ferguson, has also represented New Zealand at the Olympic and Commonwealth Games, both in canoeing and swimming events.

Awards
Preceded by Chris Lewis	New Zealand's Sportsman of the Year; 1984	Succeeded by Susan Devoy
Preceded by Rebecca Perrott	Lonsdale Cup of the New Zealand Olympic Committee; 1979; 1984; 1985 (with: Paul MacDonald)	Succeeded by Anthony Cuff
Preceded by David Barnes and Hamish Willcox	Lonsdale Cup of the New Zealand Olympic Committee; 1979; 1984; 1985 (with: Paul MacDonald)	Succeeded by himself and Paul MacDonald
Preceded by himself	Lonsdale Cup of the New Zealand Olympic Committee; 1979; 1984; 1985 (with: Paul MacDonald)	Succeeded by Anthony Mosse
