= Alan Thompson (canoeist) =

New Zealand canoeist

Personal information
- Born: Alan Blair Thompson; 14 June 1959 (age 67) Gisborne, New Zealand
- Height: 179 cm (5 ft 10 in)
- Weight: 83 kg (183 lb)

Sport
- Sport: Canoe sprint
Medal record
Men's canoe sprint
Representing New Zealand
Olympic Games
Gold medal – first place	1984 Los Angeles	K-1 1000 m
Gold medal – first place	1984 Los Angeles	K-4 1000 m
World Championships
Silver medal – second place	1982 Belgrade	K-1 1000 m
Silver medal – second place	1982 Belgrade	K-2 500 m
Bronze medal – third place	1983 Tampere	K-1 1000 m

Alan Blair Thompson (born 14 June 1959) is a sprint canoeist who competed in the early to mid-1980s. He competed at three Olympic Games (1980–1988) and won two Olympic gold medals for New Zealand.

Thompson was born in 1959 in Gisborne, New Zealand. He attended Te Hapara Primary School, Gisborne Intermediate and Gisborne Boys' High School. and played rugby union for his high school. He was also selected for the under-18 North Island rugby team.

Thompson attended his first Summer Olympics in 1980 in Moscow and was part of the small New Zealand team of just four athletes that attended that year, as most western athletes stayed away due to the boycott that year. In the K-2 500 metres, Thompson and Geoff Walker were eliminated in the semi-final. In the K-4 1000 metres, Thompson's team did not start.

Thompson competed at six ICF Canoe Sprint World Championships between 1981 and 1987 and won three medals; two silvers (K-1 1000 m and K-2 500 m: both 1982), and a bronze (K-1 1000 m: 1983).

He won both of his Olympic gold medals at Los Angeles in 1984, in the K-1 1000 m and K-4 1000 m events. Thompson is one of the few New Zealanders to have won two or more Olympic gold medals. He went to his third Olympics in 1988 in Seoul, South Korea, and came sixth in the K-1 1000 m.

After retiring from top-level canoeing Thompson became a coach, selector and manager for New Zealand canoeing teams and eventually became president of the New Zealand Canoeing Federation. He is self-employed in Gisborne.

Thompson is married to Australian Olympic sprint canoeist Elizabeth Blencowe.
