= Paul MacDonald (canoeist) =

New Zealand sprint canoeist (born 1960)

Paul MacDonald MBE
Personal information
- Full name: Christopher Paul MacDonald
- Born: 8 January 1960 (age 66) Auckland, New Zealand

Sport
- Country: New Zealand
- Sport: Canoe racing
- Event: canoe sprint
- Partner: Ian Ferguson
Medal record
Men's canoe sprint
Representing New Zealand
Olympic Games
Gold medal – first place	1984 Los Angeles	K-2 500 m
Gold medal – first place	1984 Los Angeles	K-4 1000 m
Gold medal – first place	1988 Seoul	K-2 500 m
Silver medal – second place	1988 Seoul	K-2 1000 m
Bronze medal – third place	1988 Seoul	K-1 500 m
World Championships
Gold medal – first place	1985 Mechelen	K-2 500 m
Gold medal – first place	1987 Duisburg	K-1 500 m
Gold medal – first place	1987 Duisburg	K-2 1000 m
Silver medal – second place	1982 Belgrade	K-2 500 m
Silver medal – second place	1987 Duisburg	K-2 500 m
Silver medal – second place	1990 Poznań	K-2 10000 m

Christopher Paul MacDonald MBE (born 8 January 1960) is a New Zealand sprint canoeist who competed from the mid-1980s to the early 1990s. He is widely regarded as one of New Zealand's most successful international athletes and holds innumerable international speed records in canoeing.

MacDonald had experience in surf lifesaving when he started kayaking in the late 1970s.

== Career ==
Competing in three Summer Olympics, MacDonald won five medals. This included three golds (K-2 500 m: 1984, 1988; K-4 1000 m: 1984), one silver (K-2 1000 m: 1988), and one bronze (K-1 500 m: 1988). His five Olympic medals is the record for the second most Olympic medals won by a New Zealander, a record he shares with fellow canoeist Ian Ferguson, and equestrian Mark Todd.

He also won six medals at the ICF Canoe Sprint World Championships with three golds (K-1 500 m: 1987, K-2 500 m: 1985, K-2 1000 m: 1987) and three silvers (K-2 500 m: 1982, 1987, K-2 10000 m: 1990).

In retirement from professional competition, MacDonald has produced many television sports events and programmes including Clash of the Codes (the ultimate sporting challenge) and annually presents the Dragon Boat Festival.

== Honors and awards ==
In the 1988 New Year Honours, MacDonald was appointed a Member of the Order of the British Empire, for services to canoeing.

Awards
Preceded by Ian Ferguson	Lonsdale Cup of the New Zealand Olympic Committee; 1985 (with: Ian Ferguson); 1987	Succeeded by Anthony Mosse
Preceded by Anthony Mosse	Lonsdale Cup of the New Zealand Olympic Committee; 1985 (with: Ian Ferguson); 1987	Succeeded by Bruce Kendall
