= Canoeing at the 1980 Summer Olympics =

Canoeing at the 1980 Summer Olympics was held in the Krylatskoe Canoeing and Rowing Basin, located at the Krylatskoye Olympic Sports Complex (Krylatskoye district, Moscow). The canoeing schedule began on 30 July and ended on 2 August. 11 canoeing events were contested.

== Medal summary ==
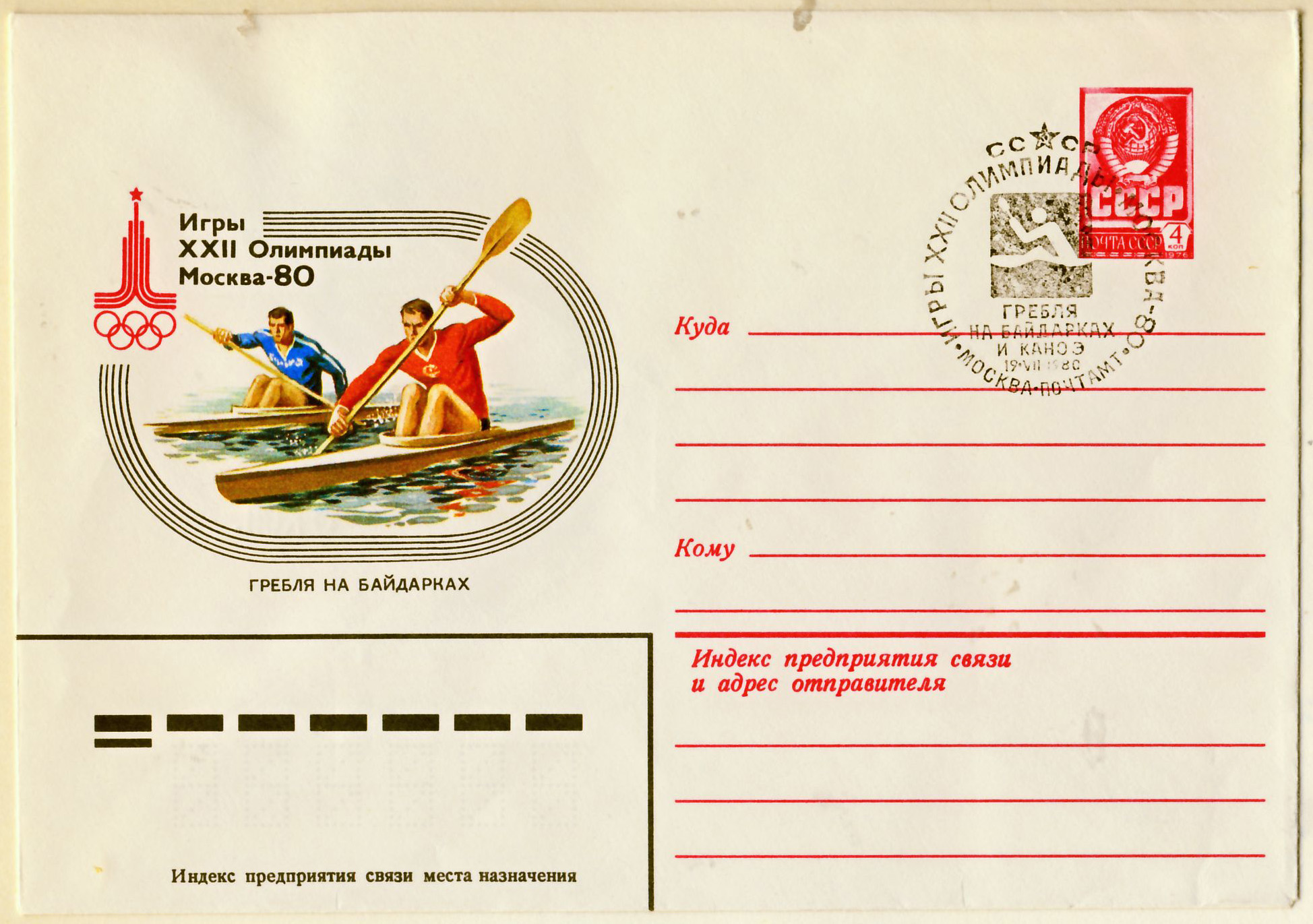
A Soviet post envelope dedicated to canoeing at the 1980 Olympics

=== Men's events ===
Games	Gold	Silver	Bronze
C-1 500 metres	Sergei Postrekhin; Soviet Union	Lyubomir Lyubenov; Bulgaria	Olaf Heukrodt; East Germany
C-1 1000 metres	Lyubomir Lyubenov; Bulgaria	Sergei Postrekhin; Soviet Union	Eckhard Leue; East Germany
C-2 500 metres	László Foltán; István Vaskúti; Hungary	Ivan Patzaichin; Petre Capusta; Romania	Borislav Ananiev; Nikolai Ilkov; Bulgaria
C-2 1000 metres	Ivan Patzaichin; Toma Simionov; Romania	Olaf Heukrodt; Uwe Madeja; East Germany	Vasyl Yurchenko; Yuri Lobanov; Soviet Union
K-1 500 metres	Vladimir Parfenovich; Soviet Union	John Sumegi; Australia	Vasile Dîba; Romania
K-1 1000 metres	Rüdiger Helm; East Germany	Alain Lebas; France	Ion Bîrlădeanu; Romania
K-2 500 metres	Vladimir Parfenovich; Sergei Chukhray; Soviet Union	Herminio Menéndez; Guillermo del Riego; Spain	Rüdiger Helm; Bernd Olbricht; East Germany
K-2 1000 metres	Vladimir Parfenovich; Sergei Chukhray; Soviet Union	István Szabó; István Joós; Hungary	Luis Gregorio Ramos; Herminio Menéndez; Spain
K-4 1000 metres	East Germany; Rüdiger Helm; Bernd Olbricht; Harald Marg; Bernd Duvigneau	Romania; Mihai Zafiu; Vasile Dîba; Ion Geantă; Nicuşor Eşanu	Bulgaria; Borislav Borisov; Bozhidar Milenkov; Lazar Khristov; Ivan Manev

=== Women's events ===
Games	Gold	Silver	Bronze
K-1 500 metres	Birgit Fischer; East Germany	Vanja Gesheva; Bulgaria	Antonina Melnikova; Soviet Union
K-2 500 metres	Carsta Genäuß; Martina Bischof; East Germany	Galina Alexeyeva; Nina Trofimova; Soviet Union	Éva Rakusz; Mária Zakariás; Hungary

== Medal table ==
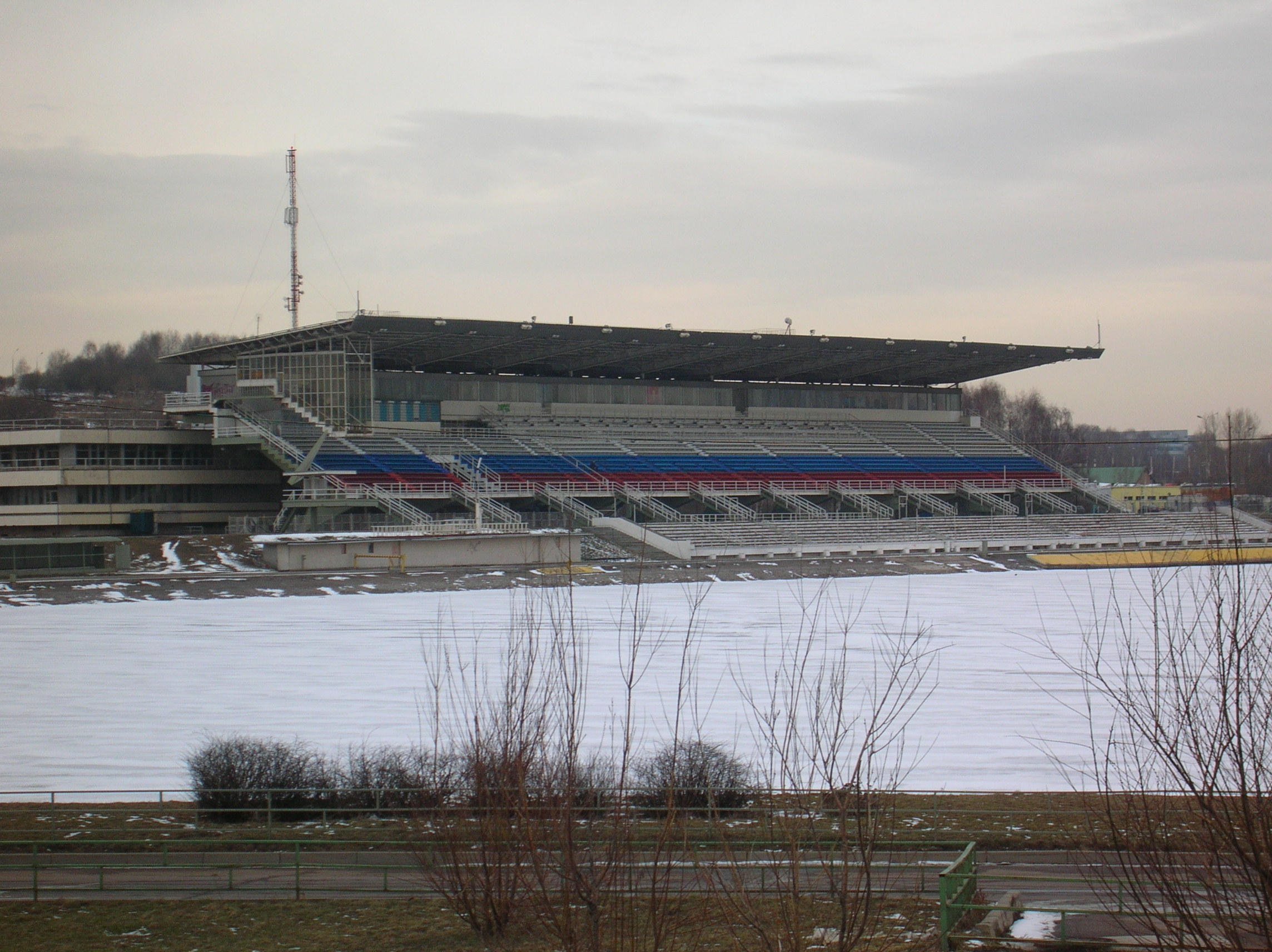
All events took place at the Moscow Canoeing and Rowing Basin in Krylatskoye

Rank	Nation	Gold	Silver	Bronze	Total
1	Soviet Union	4	2	2	8
2	East Germany	4	1	3	8
3	Bulgaria	1	2	2	5
3	Romania	1	2	2	5
5	Hungary	1	1	1	3
6	Spain	0	1	1	2
7	Australia	0	1	0	1
7	France	0	1	0	1
Totals (8 entries)		11	11	11	33

== Participating nations ==
179 canoeists from 23 nations competed

- Australia (5)
- Austria (6)
- Belgium (6)
- Bulgaria (12)
- Cuba (3)
- Denmark (1)
- Spain (5)
- Finland (4)

- France (11)
- Great Britain (10)
- East Germany (13)
- Hungary (16)
- Ireland (2)
- Italy (5)
- Netherlands (6)
- New Zealand (3)

- Poland (15)
- Romania (14)
- Switzerland (3)
- Sweden (12)
- Czechoslovakia (9)
- Soviet Union (17)
- Yugoslavia (3)
