= Canoeing at the 1980 Summer Olympics – Men's K-4 1000 metres =

The men's K-4 1000 metres event was a fours kayaking event conducted as part of the Canoeing at the 1980 Summer Olympics program.

== Medalists ==
Gold	Silver	Bronze
East Germany; Rüdiger Helm; Bernd Olbricht; Harald Marg; Bernd Duvigneau	Romania; Mihai Zafiu; Vasile Dîba; Ion Geantă; Nicușor Eșanu	Bulgaria; Borislav Borisov; Bozhidar Milenkov; Lazar Khristov; Ivan Manev

== Results ==
=== Heats ===
14 crews entered in two heats on July 31, but two teams withdrew. The top three finishers from each of the heats advanced directly to the finals while the remaining six teams were relegated to the semifinal.

Heat 1
1.	Gennady Makhnev, Serhei Nahorny, Aleksandr Avdeyev, and Vladimir Tainikov (URS)	3:02.70	QF
2.	François Barouh, Patrick Berard, Philippe Boccara, and Patrick Lefoulon (FRA)	3:04.77	QF
3.	Lars-Erik Moberg, Per Lundh, Torbjörn Thorsson, and Berndt Andersson (SWE)	3:05.20	QF
4.	József Deme, János Rátkai, József Kosztyán, and Zoltán Sztanity (HUN)	3:06.19	QS
5.	Borislav Borisov, Bozhidar Milenkov, Lazar Khristov, and Ivan Manev (BUL)	3:07.19	QS
6.	Mihai Zafiu, Vasile Dîba, Ion Geantă, and Nicușor Eșanu (ROU)	3:08.69	QS
7.	Stephen Brown, Douglas Parnham, Alan Williams, and Steven Hancock (GBR)	3:10.18	QS
Heat 2
1.	Rüdiger Helm, Bernd Olbricht, Harald Marg, and Bernd Duvigneau (GDR)	3:04.86	QF
2.	Ryszard Oborski, Grzegorz Kołtan, Daniel Wełna, and Grzegorz Śledziewski (POL)	3:09.92	QF
3.	Barry Kelly, Robert Lee, Ken Vidler, and Crosbie Baulch (AUS)	3:10.49	QF
4.	Ron Stevens, Gert Jan Lebbnik, Jan Baaijens, and Rob van Weerdenburg (NED)	3:13.62	QS
5.	Herbert Havlik, Dietmar Schlöglmann, Hans Mayr, and Eduard Reisinger (AUT)	3:13.86	QS
-	Unto Elo, Pertti Kauppila, Leo Lagström, and Harri Myllylä (FIN)	Did not start
-	Christopher MacDonald, Ian Ferguson, Alan Thompson, and Geoffrey Walker (NZL)	Did not start

=== Semifinal ===
The top three finishers in the semifinal (raced on August 2) advanced to the final.

Semifinal
1.	Mihai Zafiu, Vasile Dîba, Ion Geantă, and Nicușor Eșanu (ROU)	3:09.63	QF
2.	József Deme, János Rátkai, József Kosztyán, and Zoltán Sztanity (HUN)	3:11.46	QF
3.	Borislav Borisov, Bozhidar Milenkov, Lazar Khristov, and Ivan Manev (BUL)	3:12.00	QF
4.	Stephen Brown, Douglas Parnham, Alan Williams, and Steven Hancock (GBR)	3:13.41
5.	Herbert Havlik, Dietmar Schlöglmann, Hans Mayr, and Eduard Reisinger (AUT)	3:16.43
6.	Ron Stevens, Gert Jan Lebbnik, Jan Baaijens, and Rob van Weerdenburg (NED)	3:16.58

=== Final ===
The final was held on August 2.

Gold	Rüdiger Helm, Bernd Olbricht, Harald Marg, and Bernd Duvigneau (GDR)	3:13.76
Silver	Mihai Zafiu, Vasile Dîba, Ion Geantă, and Nicușor Eșanu (ROU)	3:15.35
Bronze	Borislav Borisov, Bozhidar Milenkov, Lazar Khristov, and Ivan Manev (BUL)	3:15.46
4.	Ryszard Oborski, Grzegorz Kołtan, Daniel Wełna, and Grzegorz Śledziewski (POL)	3:16.33
5.	József Deme, János Rátkai, József Kosztyán, and Zoltán Sztanity (HUN)	3:17.27
6.	François Barouh, Patrick Berard, Philippe Boccara, and Patrick Lefoulon (FRA)	3:17.60
7.	Gennady Makhnev, Serhei Nahorny, Aleksandr Avdeyev, and Vladimir Tainikov (URS)	3:19.83
8.	Barry Kelly, Robert Lee, Ken Vidler, and Crosbie Baulch (AUS)	3:19.87
9.	Lars-Erik Moberg, Per Lundh, Torbjörn Thorsson, and Berndt Andersson (SWE)	3:20.74
