= Canoeing at the 1980 Summer Olympics – Men's K-2 500 metres =

The men's K-2 500 metres event was a pairs kayaking event conducted as part of the Canoeing at the 1980 Summer Olympics program.

== Medalists ==
| Gold | Silver | Bronze |
| Vladimir Parfenovich and Sergei Chukhray (URS) | Herminio Menéndez and Guillermo del Riego (ESP) | Rüdiger Helm and Bernd Olbricht (GDR) |

== Results ==
=== Heats ===
20 crews were entered into the event on July 30 though two teams did not start. The top three finishers from each of the heats advanced directly to the semifinals while the remaining nine teams were relegated to the repechages.

Heat 1
| 1. | Rüdiger Helm and Bernd Olbricht (GDR) | 1:35.36 | QS |
| 2. | Barry Kelly and Robert Lee (AUS) | 1:36.31 | QS |
| 3. | László Szabó and Zoltán Romhányi (HUN) | 1:36.99 | QS |
| 4. | Alexandru Giura and Ion Bîrlădeanu (ROU) | 1:37.34 | QR |
| 5. | Jens Nordqvist and Thomas Ohlsson (SWE) | 1:38.13 | QR |
| 6. | Antonio Mastrandrea and Danio Merli (ITA) | 1:39.84 | QR |
| - | Slavcho Mangarakov and Boiko Savov (BUL) | Did not start |
Heat 2
| 1. | Vladimir Parfenovich and Sergei Chukhray (URS) | 1:33.75 | QS |
| 2. | Wolfgang Hartl and Werner Bachmayer (AUT) | 1:36.66 | QS |
| 3. | Waldemar Merk and Zdzisław Szubski (POL) | 1:36.98 | QS |
| 4. | Ron Stevens and Gert Jan Lebbnik (NED) | 1:37.15 | QR |
| 5. | Peter Ammann and Dionys Thalmann (SUI) | 1:39.14 | QR |
| 6. | Alan Thompson and Geoffrey Walker (NZL) | 1:39.30 | QR |
| 7. | Christopher Ballard and Neil Robson (GBR) | 1:40.33 | QR |
Heat 3
| 1. | Herminio Menéndez and Guillermo del Riego (ESP) | 1:34.16 | QS |
| 2. | Francis Hervieu and Alain Lebas (FRA) | 1:34.61 | QS |
| 3. | Jiří Svoboda and Vladimír Dolejš (TCH) | 1:36.29 | QS |
| 4. | Jose Marrero and Reynoldo Cunill (CUB) | 1:36.49 | QR |
| 5. | Jacky Alders and Gaëtans Frys (BEL) | 1:43.31 | QR |
| - | Milan Janić and Jovan Djolić (YUG) | Did not start |

=== Repechages ===
The nine crews first raced in two repechages on July 30. The top three finishers from each of the repechages advanced directly to the semifinals.

Repechage 1
| 1. | Alexandru Giura and Ion Bîrlădeanu (ROU) | 1:38.55 | QS |
| 2. | Antonio Mastrandrea and Danio Merli (ITA) | 1:39.64 | QS |
| 3. | Christopher Ballard and Neil Robson (GBR) | 1:39.95 | QS |
| 4. | Jacky Alders and Gaëtans Frys (BEL) | 1:40.43 |
| 5. | Peter Ammann and Dionys Thalmann (SUI) | 1:40.92 |
Repechage 2
| 1. | Jose Marrero and Reynoldo Cunill (CUB) | 1:37.85 | QS |
| 2. | Alan Thompson and Geoffrey Walker (NZL) | 1:39.32 | QS |
| 3. | Jens Nordqvist and Thomas Ohlsson (SWE) | 1:39.89 | QS |
| 4. | Ron Stevens and Gert Jan Lebbnik (NED) | 1:41.03 |

=== Semifinals ===
The top three finishers in each of the semifinals (raced on August 1) advanced to the final.

Semifinal 1
| 1. | Rüdiger Helm and Bernd Olbricht (GDR) | 1:35.88 | QF |
| 2. | Alexandru Giura and Ion Bîrlădeanu (ROU) | 1:36.90 | QF |
| 3. | Jens Nordqvist and Thomas Ohlsson (SWE) | 1:37.42 | QF |
| 4. | Jiří Svoboda and Vladimír Dolejš (TCH) | 1:37.89 |
| 5. | Wolfgang Hartl and Werner Bachmayer (AUT) | 1:39.04 |
Semifinal 2
| 1. | Vladimir Parfenovich and Sergei Chukhray (URS) | 1:34.71 | QF |
| 2. | Francis Hervieu and Alain Lebas (FRA) | 1:36.04 | QF |
| 3. | László Szabó and Zoltán Romhányi (HUN) | 1:36.98 | QF |
| 4. | Jose Marrero and Reynoldo Cunill (CUB) | 1:37.20 |
| 5. | Christopher Ballard and Neil Robson (GBR) | 1:41.37 |
Semifinal 3
| 1. | Herminio Menéndez and Guillermo del Riego (ESP) | 1:35.59 | QF |
| 2. | Barry Kelly and Robert Lee (AUS) | 1:36.63 | QF |
| 3. | Waldemar Merk and Zdzisław Szubski (POL) | 1:37.45 | QF |
| 4. | Alan Thompson and Geoffrey Walker (NZL) | 1:38.38 |
| 5. | Antonio Mastrandrea and Danio Merli (ITA) | 1:41.23 |

=== Final ===
The final was held on August 1.

| Gold | Vladimir Parfenovich and Sergei Chukhray (URS) | 1:32.38 |
| Silver | Herminio Menéndez and Guillermo del Riego (ESP) | 1:33.65 |
| Bronze | Rüdiger Helm and Bernd Olbricht (GDR) | 1:34.00 |
| 4. | Francis Hervieu and Alain Lebas (FRA) | 1:36.22 |
| 5. | Barry Kelly and Robert Lee (AUS) | 1:36.81 |
| 6. | Alexandru Giura and Ion Bîrlădeanu (ROU) | 1:36.96 |
| 7. | Waldemar Merk and Zdzisław Szubski (POL) | 1:37.20 |
| 8. | László Szabó and Zoltán Romhányi (HUN) | 1:37.66 |
| 9. | Jens Nordqvist and Thomas Ohlsson (SWE) | 1:39.92 |
