= 1980 Summer Olympics Parade of Nations =

During the parade of nations portion of the 1980 Summer Olympics opening ceremony, athletes from each country participating in the Olympics paraded in the arena, preceded by their flag. The flag was borne by a sportsperson from that country chosen either by the National Olympic Committee or by the athletes themselves to represent their country.

== Parade order ==
As the nation of the first modern Olympic Games, Greece entered the stadium first; whereas, the host nation Soviet Union marched last, in accordance with the tradition and IOC guidelines. As each delegation entered accompanied by the Soviet march music, the national name was announced in Russian.

Eighty nations entered the stadium with a combined total of 5,179 athletes, the smallest since 1956. Seven of them made their Olympic debut, namely Angola, Botswana, Cyprus, Jordan, Laos, Mozambique and Seychelles.

In partial support of the United States-led boycott, sixteen countries marched into the Olympic stadium under the Olympic flag. Seven of them, however, did not attend the opening ceremonies, their flags were instead carried by Moscow Olympic Committee volunteers. Two other countries (Great Britain and Ireland) paraded into the Stadium only with their officials, while four of them participated under the Olympic flag with their athletes. New Zealand, Portugal, and Spain, on the other hand, participated in the Games under their NOC flags. Due to the boycott, this marked the United States' first (and only) absence from the Olympics for the first time in the 84-year history. United States (Соединённые Штаты Америки Soyedinyonnyye Shtaty Ameriki, "United States of America") would have marched between Syria and Tanzania, Somalia joined the US-led boycott. Somalia would’ve marched between Senegal and Sierra Leone.

== List ==
The following is a list of each country's announced flag bearer. The list is sorted by the order in which each nation appears in the parade of nations. The names are given in their official designations by the IOC.

This table is sortable by country name (in Russian), the flag bearer's name, and the flag bearer's sport.

| Order | Nation | Russian | Transliteration | Flag bearer | Sport |
|---|---|---|---|---|---|
| 1 | Greece | Греция | Gretsiya | Ilias Hatzipavlis | Sailing |
| 2 | Australia | Австралия | Avstraliya | Denise Boyd | Athletics |
| 2 | Australia | Австралия | Avstraliya | Max Metzker | Swimming |
| 3 | Austria | Австрия | Avstriya | Karl Ferstl | Sailing |
| 4 | Algeria | Алжир | Alzhir | Djamel Yahiouche | Swimming |
| 5 | Angola | Ангола | Angola | Fernando Lopes | Swimming |
| 6 | Andorra | ОК Андорра | OK Andorra | Francesc Gaset Fris | Shooting |
| 7 | Afghanistan | Афганистан | Afghanistan | | |
| 8 | Belgium | КОИБ (Бельгия) | KOIB (Beľgiya) | Moscow 1980 – Volunteer | |
| 9 | Benin | Бенин | Benin | | |
| 10 | Burma | Бирма | Birma | | |
| 11 | Bulgaria | Болгария | Bolgariya | Aleksandar Tomov | Wrestling |
| 12 | Botswana | Ботсвана | Botsvana | | |
| 13 | Brazil | Бразилия | Brazilia | João Carlos de Oliveira | Athletics |
| 14 | Great Britain | Британская ОА | Britanskaya OA | Richard Palmer | Official |
| 15 | Hungary | Венгрия | Vengriya | István Szívós, Jr. | Water polo |
| 16 | Venezuela | Венесуэла | Venesuėla | Antonio Esparragoza | Boxing |
| 17 | Vietnam | Вьетнам | Vyetnam | | |
| 18 | Guyana | Гайана | Gaïana | | |
| 19 | Guatemala | Гватемала | Gvatemala | Carlos Silva | Shooting |
| 20 | Guinea | Гвинея | Gvinea | | |
| 21 | German Democratic Republic | ГДР | GDR (Note: GDR – Germanskaya Demokraticheskaya Respublika) | Kristina Richter | Handball |
| 22 | Denmark | Дания | Daniya | Jørgen Lindhardsen | Sailing |
| 23 | Dominican Republic | Доминиканская Республика | Dominikanskaya Respublika | Marisela Peralta | Athletics |
| 24 | Zambia | Замбия | Zambiya | | |
| 25 | Zimbabwe | Зимбабве | Zimbabve | Abel Nkhoma | Athletics |
| 26 | India | Индия | Indiya | | |
| 27 | Jordan | Иордания | Iordaniya | Abdul Latif Abdul Magid | Official |
| 28 | Iraq | Ирак | Irak | | |
| 29 | Ireland | Ирландия | Irlandiya | Ken Ryan | Official |
| 30 | Iceland | Исландия | Islandiya | Birgir Borgþórsson | Weightlifting |
| 31 | Spain | ОК Испании | OK Ispanii | Herminio Menéndez | Canoeing |
| 32 | Italy | НОК Италии | NOK Italii | Moscow 1980 – Volunteer | |
| 33 | Cameroon | Камерун | Kamerun | | |
| 34 | Cyprus | Кипр | Kipr | Kostas Papakostas | Judo |
| 35 | Colombia | Колумбия | Kolumbiya | | |
| 36 | Republic of the Congo | НР Конго | NR Kongo (Note: NR Kongo – Narodnaya Respublika Kongo) | | |
| 37 | Democratic People's Republic of Korea | КНДР | KNDR (Note: KNDR – Koreiskaya Narodnaya Demokraticheskaya Respublika) | | |
| 38 | Costa Rica | Коста-Рика | Kosta-Rika | María París | Swimming |
| 39 | Cuba | Куба | Kuba | Teófilo Stevenson | Boxing |
| 40 | Kuwait | Кувейт | Kuveït | | |
| 41 | Laos | Лаос | Laos | Panh Khemanith | Athletics |
| 42 | Lesotho | Лесото | Lesoto | | |
| 43 | Liberia (Note: Liberia withdrew after marching in the opening ceremony and joined the United States-led boycott.) | Либерия | Liberiya | | |
| 44 | Lebanon | Ливан | Livan | Toni Khouri | Official |
| 45 | Libyan Arab Jamahiriya | Джамахирия (Джамахирии Араб Ливий) | Dzhamakhiriya (Dzhamakhirii Arab Livii) | | |
| 46 | Luxembourg | КОСЛ (Люксембург) | KOSL (Lyuksemburg) | Moscow 1980 – Volunteer | |
| 47 | Madagascar | Мадагаскар | Madagaskar | | |
| 48 | Mali | Мали | Mali | | |
| 49 | Malta | Мальта | Maľta | Frans Chetcuti | Shooting |
| 50 | Mexico | Мексика | Meksika | Carlos Girón | Diving |
| 51 | Mozambique | Мозамбик | Mozambik | | |
| 52 | Mongolia | Монголия | Mongoliya | Zevegiin Düvchin | Wrestling |
| 53 | Nepal | Непал | Nepal | | |
| 54 | Nigeria | Нигерия | Nigeriya | | |
| 55 | Netherlands | НОК Нидерландов | NOK Niderlandov | Moscow 1980 – Volunteer | |
| 56 | Nicaragua | Никарагуа | Nikaragua | Xiomara Larios | Athletics |
| 57 | New Zealand | Новая Зеландия | Novaya Zelandiya | Brian Newth | Modern pentathlon |
| 58 | Peru | Перу | Peru | Walter Perón | Shooting |
| 59 | Poland | Польша | Poľsha | Czesław Kwieciński | Wrestling |
| 60 | Portugal | ОК Португалии | OK Portugalii | Esbela da Fonseca | Gymnastics (non-participant) |
| 61 | Puerto Rico | Пуэрто-Рико | Puėrto-Riko | Alberto Mercado | Boxing |
| 62 | Romania | Румыния | Rumyniya | Vasile Andrei | Wrestling |
| 63 | San Marino | ОК Сан-Марино | OK San-Marino | Moscow 1980 – Volunteer | |
| 64 | Seychelles | Сейшелы | Seïshely | Michael Pillay | Boxing |
| 65 | Senegal | Сенегал | Senegal | | |
| 66 | Sierra Leone | Сьерра-Леоне | Syerra-Leone | | |
| 67 | Syria | Сирия | Siriya | | |
| 68 | Tanzania | Танзания | Tanzaniya | | |
| 69 | Trinidad and Tobago | Тринидад и Тобаго | Trinidad i Tobago | Hasely Crawford | Athletics |
| 70 | Uganda | Уганда | Uganda | | |
| 71 | Finland | Финляндия | Finlyandiya | Peter Tallberg | Sailing |
| 72 | France | НОК Франции | NOK Frantsii | Moscow 1980 – Volunteer | |
| 73 | Czechoslovakia | Чехословакия | Chekhoslovakiya | Vítězslav Mácha | Wrestling |
| 74 | Switzerland | ОК Швейцарии | OK Shveïtsarii | Moscow 1980 – Volunteer | |
| 75 | Sweden | Швеция | Shvetsiya | Stig Pettersson | Athletics (official) |
| 76 | Sri Lanka | Шри-Ланка | Shri-Lanka | | |
| 77 | Ecuador | Эквадор | Ėkvador | Nancy Vallecilla | Athletics |
| 78 | Ethiopia | Эфиопия | Ėfiopiya | | |
| 79 | Yugoslavia | Югославия | Yugoslaviya | Matija Ljubek | Canoeing |
| 80 | Jamaica | Ямайка | Yamaĩka | | |
| 81 | Soviet Union | CCCP | SSSR (Note: SSSR – Soyuz Sovetskih Sotsialisticheskih Respublik) | Nikolay Balboshin | Wrestling |

== Links ==
- Flagbearers for 1980 Summer Olympics
