= Canoeing at the 1980 Summer Olympics – Men's K-2 1000 metres =

The men's K-2 1000 metres event was a pairs kayaking event conducted as part of the Canoeing at the 1980 Summer Olympics program.

== Medalists ==
Gold	Silver	Bronze
Vladimir Parfenovich and Sergei Chukhray (URS)	István Szabó and István Joós (HUN)	Luis Gregorio Ramos and Herminio Menéndez (ESP)

== Results ==
=== Heats ===
19 crews entered in three heats on July 31, but three did not start. The top three finishers from each of the heats advanced directly to the semifinals. The remaining seven teams were relegated to the repechage heats.

Heat 1
1.	Luis Gregario Ramos and Herminio Menéndez (ESP)	3:24.83	QS
2.	Peter Hempel and Harry Nolte (GDR)	3:25.71	QS
3.	Alexandru Giura and Nicolae Ticu (ROU)	3:26.50	QS
4.	Ron Stevens and Gert Jan Lebbink (NED)	3:29.74	QR
5.	Krzysztof Lepianka and Andrzej Klimaszewski (POL)	3:31.80	QR
6.	Antonio Mastrandrea and Danio Merli (ITA)	3:36.18	QR
7.	Jens Nordqvist and Thomas Ohlsson (SWE)	3:40.37	QR
Heat 2
1.	Vladimir Parfenovich and Sergei Chukhray (URS)	3:24.61	QS
2.	István Szábó and István Joós (HUN)	3:28.20	QS
3.	Christopher Ballard and Neil Robson (GBR)	3:28.95	QS
4.	Herbert Havlik and Dietmar Schlöglmann (AUT)	3:28.95	QR
-	Milan Janić and Jovan Jiolić (YUG)	Did not start
-	Alain Lebas and Francis Hervieu (FRA)	Did not start
Heat 3
1.	Jose Marrero and Reynoldo Cunill (CUB)	3:34.04	QS
2.	Alan Thompson and Geoffrey Walker (NZL)	3:34.43	QS
3.	Jos Broeckx and Paul Stinckens (BEL)	3:40.86	QS
4.	Jiří Svoboda and Vladimír Dolejš (TCH)	3:59.27	QR
5.	Peter Ammann and Dionys Thalmann (SUI)	4:11.02	QR
-	Lazar Khristov and Georgi Donchev (BUL)	Did not start

=== Repechages ===
Taking place on July 31, the top three competitors in each of the two repechages advanced to the semifinals.

Repechage 1
1.	Ron Stevens and Gert Jan Lebbink (NED)	3:35.97	QS
2.	Antonio Mastrandrea and Danio Merli (ITA)	3:39.96	QS
3.	Peter Ammann and Dionys Thalmann (SUI)	3:41.19	QS
Repechage 2
1.	Herbert Havlik and Dietmar Schlöglmann (AUT)	3:32.08	QS
2.	Jens Nordqvist and Thomas Ohlsson (SWE)	3:32.43	QS
3.	Jiří Svoboda and Vladimír Dolejš (TCH)	3:32.79	QS
4.	Krzysztof Lepianka and Andrzej Klimaszewski (POL)	3:33.31

=== Semifinals ===
The top three finishers in each of the three semifinals (raced on August 2) advanced to the final.

Semifinal 1
1.	Luis Gregario Ramos and Herminio Menéndez (ESP)	3:36.08	QF
2.	István Szábó and István Joós (HUN)	3:37.12	QF
3.	Ron Stevens and Gert Jan Lebbink (NED)	3:37.30	QF
4.	Jiří Svoboda and Vladimír Dolejš (TCH)	3:37.76
5.	Jos Broeckx and Paul Stinckens (BEL)	3:46.10
Semifinal 2
1.	Vladimir Parfenovich and Sergei Chukhray (URS)	3:35.81	QF
2.	Alexandru Giura and Nicolae Ticu (ROU)	3:37.00	QF
3.	Alan Thompson and Geoffrey Walker (NZL)	3:38.64	QF
4.	Herbert Havlik and Dietmar Schlöglmann (AUT)	3:38.91
5.	Peter Ammann and Dionys Thalmann (SUI)	3:43.12
Semifinal 3
1.	Peter Hempel and Harry Nolte (GDR)	3:32.77	QF
2.	Jose Marrero and Reynoldo Cunill (CUB)	3:35.09	QF
3.	Antonio Mastrandrea and Danio Merli (ITA)	3:35.85	QF
4.	Christopher Ballard and Neil Robson (GBR)	3:40.31
5.	Jens Nordqvist and Thomas Ohlsson (SWE)	3:40.59

=== Final ===
The final was held on August 2.

Gold	Vladimir Parfenovich and Sergei Chukhray (URS)	3:26.72
Silver	István Szabó and István Joós (HUN)	3:28.49
Bronze	Luis Gregorio Ramos and Herminio Menéndez (ESP)	3:28.66
4.	Alexandru Giura and Nicolae Ticu (ROU)	3:28.94
5.	Peter Hempel and Harry Nolte (GDR)	3:31.02
6.	Jose Marrero and Reynoldo Cunill (CUB)	3:31.12
7.	Ron Stevens and Gert Jan Lebbink (NED)	3:33.18
8.	Alan Thompson and Geoffrey Walker (NZL)	3:33.83
9.	Antonio Mastrandrea and Danio Merli (ITA)	3:52.32
