= Canoeing at the 1976 Summer Olympics – Men's K-4 1000 metres =

The men's K-4 1000 metres event was a fours kayaking event conducted as part of the Canoeing at the 1976 Summer Olympics program.

== Medalists ==
Gold	Silver	Bronze
Soviet Union; Sergei Chukhray; Aleksandr Degtyarev; Yuri Filatov; Vladimir Morozov	Spain; José María Esteban; José Ramón López; Herminio Menéndez; Luis Gregorio Ramos	East Germany; Frank-Peter Bischof; Bernd Duvigneau; Rüdiger Helm; Jürgen Lehnert

== Results ==
=== Heats ===
The 20 crews first raced in three heats on July 29. The top three finishers from each of the heats advanced directly to the semifinals while the remaining 11 teams were relegated to the repechage heats.

Heat 1
1.	José María Esteban, José Ramón López, Herminio Menéndez, and Luis Gregorio Ramos (ESP)	3:06.46	QS
2.	Sergei Chukhray, Aleksandr Degtyarev, Yuri Filatov, and Vladimir Morozov (URS)	3:08.77	QS
3.	Ivan Manev, Bozhidar Milenkov, Nikolai Nachev, and Vasil Chilingirov (BUL)	3:11.39	QS
4.	Kjell Hasselqvist, Anders Larsson, Håkan Mattson, and Sakari Peltonen (SWE)	3:14.24	QR
5.	Hugh Fisher, Jean Fournel, Peter Patasi, and Lou Tollas (CAN)	3:19.17	QR
6.	Anthony Alan-Williams, Brian Haynes, John Oliver, and Alan Williams (GBR)	3:19.35	QR
7.	Luciano Buonfiglio, Massimo Moriconi, Pier Duilio Puccetti, and Andrea Salvietti (ITA)	3:19.60	QR
Heat 2
1.	Frank-Peter Bischof, Bernd Duvigneau, Rüdiger Helm, and Jürgen Lehnert (GDR)	3:06.75	QS
2.	Henryk Budzicz, Kazimierz Górecki, Grzegorz Kołtan, and Ryszard Oborski (POL)	3:07.91	QS
3.	Jürgen Bohr, Edgar Hartung, Helmar Mang, and Chris van Eeden (FRG)	3:09.17	QS
4.	József Deme, Csaba Giczy, János Rátkai, and Zoltán Romhányi (HUN)	3:15.52	QR
5.	Bruce Barton, Peter Deyo, Stephen Kelly, and Brent Turner (USA)	3:18.12	QR
6.	Declan Burns, Brendan O'Connell, Ian Pringle, and Howard Watkins (IRL)	3:27.56	QR
7.	Kwan Honk Wai, Mak Chi Wai, Ng Tsuen Man, and John Wai (HKG)	3:55.72	QR
Heat 3
1.	Nicușor Eșanu, Vasilie Simiocenco, Nicolae Simioncenco, and Mihai Zafiu (ROU)	3:06.88	QS
2.	Graham Gilles, Dennis Heussner, John Sumegi, and John Trail (AUS)	3:10.26	QS
3.	Morten Mørland, Einar Rasmussen, Olaf Søyland, and Jostein Stige (NOR)	3:10.60	QS
4.	Jacky Alders, Jos Broekx, Paul Broekx, and Paul Stinckens (BEL)	3:14.68	QR
5.	Heikki Mäkelä, Eero Hynninen, Ilkka Nummisto, and Unto Elo (FIN)	3:16.29	QR
6.	Vladimír Dolejš, Viktor Podloucký, Jiří Svoboda, and Jindřich Wybraniec (TCH)	3:18.03	QR

=== Repechages ===
Taking place on July 29, The top three competitors in each of the two repechages advanced to the semifinals.

Repechage 1
1.	Kjell Hasselqvist, Anders Larsson, Håkan Mattson, and Sakari Peltonen (SWE)	3:08.72	QS
2.	Anthony Alan-Williams, Brian Haynes, John Oliver, and Alan Williams (GBR)	3:09.62	QS
3.	Vladimír Dolejš, Viktor Podloucký, Jiří Svoboda, and Jindřich Wybraniec (TCH)	3:10.62	QS
4.	Bruce Barton, Peter Deyo, Stephen Kelly, and Brent Turner (USA)	3:11.71
5.	Heikki Mäkelä, Eero Hynninen, Ilkka Nummisto, and Unto Elo (FIN)	3:13.73
6.	Kwan Honk Wai, Mak Chi Wai, Ng Tsuen Man, and John Wai (HKG)	3:53.75
Repechage 2
1.	József Deme, Csaba Giczy, János Rátkai, and Zoltán Romhányi (HUN)	3:06.89	QS
2.	Jos Broekx, Roger T'Joncke, Jean-Marie D'Haese, and Paul Stinckens (BEL)	3:09.71	QS
3.	Hugh Fisher, Jean Fournel, Peter Patasi, and Lou Tollas (CAN)	3:11.55	QS
4.	Luciano Buonfiglio, Massimo Moriconi, Pier Duilio Puccetti, and Andrea Salvietti (ITA)	3:19.53
5.	Declan Burns, Brendan O'Connell, Ian Pringle, and Howard Watkins (IRL)	3:22.06

=== Semifinals ===
The top three finishers in each of the three semifinals (raced on July 31) advanced to the final.

Semifinal 1
1.	José María Esteban, José Ramón López, Herminio Menéndez, and Luis Gregorio Ramos (ESP)	3:10.89	QF
2.	Morten Mørland, Einar Rasmussen, Olaf Søyland, and Jostein Stige (NOR)	3:11.84	QF
3.	Henryk Budzicz, Kazimierz Górecki, Grzegorz Kołtan, and Ryszard Oborski (POL)	3:13.62	QF
4.	Hugh Fisher, Jean Fournel, Peter Patasi, and Lou Tollas (CAN)	3:14.49
5.	Kjell Hasselqvist, Anders Larsson, Håkan Mattson, and Sakari Peltonen (SWE)	3:17.60
Semifinal 2
1.	Frank-Peter Bischof, Bernd Duvigneau, Rüdiger Helm, and Jürgen Lehnert (GDR)	3:10.84	QF
2.	József Deme, Csaba Giczy, János Rátkai, and Zoltán Romhányi (HUN)	3:12.21	QF
3.	Ivan Manev, Bozhidar Milenkov, Nikolai Nachev, and Vasil Chilingirov (BUL)	3:14.35	QF
4.	Graham Gilles, Dennis Heussner, John Sumegi, and John Trail (AUS)	3:16.35
5.	Vladimír Dolejš, Viktor Podloucký, Jiří Svoboda, and Jindřich Wybraniec (TCH)	3:18.71
Semifinal 3
1.	Sergei Chukhray, Aleksandr Degtyarev, Yuri Filatov, and Vladimirr Morozov (URS)	3:13.52	QF
2.	Nicușor Eșanu, Vasilie Simiocenco, Nicolae Simioncenco, and Mihai Zafiu (ROU)	3:15.60	QF
3.	Jürgen Bohr, Edgar Hartung, Helmar Mang, and Chris van Eeden (FRG)	3:16.14	QF
4.	Jos Broekx, Roger T'Joncke, Jean-Marie D'Haese, and Paul Stinckens (BEL)	3:18.34
5.	Anthony Alan-Williams, Brian Haynes, John Oliver, and Alan Williams (GBR)	3:19.32

=== Final ===
The final was held on July 31.

Gold	Sergei Chukhray, Aleksandr Degtyarev, Yuri Filatov, and Vladimir Morozov (URS)	3:08.69
Silver	José María Esteban, José Ramón López, Herminio Menéndez, and Luis Gregorio Ramos (ESP)	3:08.95
Bronze	Frank-Peter Bischof, Bernd Duvigneau, Rüdiger Helm, and Jürgen Lehnert (GDR)	3:10.76
4.	Nicușor Eșanu, Vasilie Simiocenco, Nicolae Simioncenco, and Mihai Zafiu (ROU)	3:11.35
5.	Henryk Budzicz, Kazimierz Górecki, Grzegorz Kołtan, and Ryszard Oborski (POL)	3:12.17
6.	Morten Mørland, Einar Rasmussen, Olaf Søyland, and Jostein Stige (NOR)	3:12.38
7.	Ivan Manev, Bozhidar Milenkov, Nikolai Nachev, and Vasil Chilingirov (BUL)	3:12.94
8.	József Deme, Csaba Giczy, János Rátkai, and Zoltán Romhányi (HUN)	3:14.67
9.	Jürgen Bohr, Edgar Hartung, Helmar Mang, and Chris van Eeden (FRG)	3:24.19

The Soviets, third at the 750 meter mark, edged out Spain who was the surprise winner in this event at the 1975 ICF Canoe Sprint World Championships.
