= Makhnev =

Makhnev (masculine, Russian: Махнев) or Makhneva (feminine, Russian: Махнева) is a Russian surname. Notable people with the surname include:

- Denis Makhnev (born 2000), Kazakhstani chess grandmaster
- Elena Makhnev, Mexican violinist
- Gennady Makhnev (born 1951), Soviet sprint canoer
- Marharyta Makhneva (born 1992), Belarusian sprint canoeist, wife of Vadzim
- Vadzim Makhneu (born 1979), Belarusian flatwater canoer, son of Gennady

== See also ==
- Makhneva, Perm Krai, a village in Russia
