= Canoeing at the 1976 Summer Olympics – Men's K-1 500 metres =

The men's K-1 500 metres event was an individual kayaking event conducted as part of the Canoeing at the 1976 Summer Olympics program. This event made its debut at these games.

== Medalists ==
Gold	Silver	Bronze
Vasile Dîba (ROU)	Zoltán Sztanity (HUN)	Rüdiger Helm (GDR)

== Results ==
=== Heats ===
The 18 competitors first raced in three heats on July 28. The top three finishers from each of the heats advanced directly to the semifinals while the rest competed in the repechages.

Heat 1
1.	Grzegorz Śledziewski (POL)	1:54.27	QS
2.	Herminio Menéndez (ESP)	1:55.23	QS
3.	Oreste Perri (ITA)	1:55.39	QS
4.	Ladislav Souček (TCH)	1:59.06	QR
5.	Dean Oldershaw (CAN)	2:01.04	QR
6.	Henry Krawczyk (USA)	2:04.84	QR
7.	Alain Lebas (FRA)	2:05.46	QR
Heat 2
1.	Rüdiger Helm (GDR)	1:55.06	QS
2.	Zoltán Sztanity (HUN)	1:57.12	QS
3.	Douglas Parnham (GBR)	1:58.36	QS
4.	Gaetan Frys (BEL)	1:59.29	QR
5.	Hans Eich (FRG)	2:11.37	QR
6.	Ng Tsuen Man (HKG)	2:18.31	QR
Heat 3
1.	Vasile Dîba (ROU)	1:54.14	QS
2.	Sergey Lizunov (URS)	1:54.47	QS
3.	Ivan Manev (BUL)	1:57.30	QS
4.	Ian Ferguson (NZL)	1:59.18	QR
5.	Harald Nilsen (NOR)	2:10.88	QR

=== Repechages ===
Taking place on July 28, the top three finishers from each repechage advanced to the semifinals.

Repechage 1
1.	Ladislav Souček (TCH)	1:53.20	QS
2.	Hans Eich (FRG)	1:54.23	QS
3.	Harald Nilsen (NOR)	1:55.77	QS
4.	Henry Krawczyk (USA)	2:03.25
Repechage 2
1.	Dean Oldershaw (CAN)	1:53.32	QS
2.	Gaetan Frys (BEL)	1:53.35	QS
3.	Alain Lebas (FRA)	1:53.41	QS
4.	Ian Ferguson (NZL)	1:53.65
5.	Ng Tsuen Man (HKG)	2:07.25

=== Semifinals ===
The top three finishers in each of the three semifinals (raced on July 30) advanced to the final.

Semifinal 1
1.	Grzegorz Śledziewski (POL)	1:52.39	QF
2.	Zoltán Sztanity (HUN)	1:53.79	QF
3.	Alain Lebas (FRA)	1:54.64	QF
4.	Ivan Manev (BUL)	1:57.30
5.	Ladislav Souček (TCH)	2:00.36
Semifinal 2
1.	Sergey Lizunov (URS)	1:52.38	QF
2.	Rüdiger Helm (GDR)	1:53.21	QF
3.	Oreste Perri (ITA)	1:53.99	QF
4.	Dean Oldershaw (CAN)	1:54.88
5.	Harald Nilsen (NOR)	1:58.76
Semifinal 3
1.	Vasile Dîba (ROU)	1:53.64	QF
2.	Herminio Menéndez (ESP)	1:54.66	QF
3.	Douglas Parnham (GBR)	1:56.14	QF
4.	Gaetan Frys (BEL)	1:57.30
5.	Hans Eich (FRG)	2:04.63

=== Final ===
The final was held on July 30.

	Vasile Dîba (ROU)	1:46.41
	Zoltán Sztanity (HUN)	1:46.95
	Rüdiger Helm (GDR)	1:48.30
4.	Herminio Menéndez (ESP)	1:48.40
5.	Grzegorz Śledziewski (POL)	1:48.49
6.	Sergey Lizunov (URS)	1:49.21
7.	Oreste Perri (ITA)	1:50.27
8.	Douglas Parnham (GBR)	1:50.33
9.	Alain Lebas (FRA)	1:50.48
