= Hervieu =

Hervieu is a surname of French origin. Notable people with the surname include:

- Catherine Hervieu (born 1958), French politician
- Félicie Hervieu (1840- ?) French personality at the origin of several social innovations
- Paul Hervieu (1857-1915), French dramatist and novelist
- Louise Hervieu (1878-1954), French writer, artist, painter, draftsman, and lithographer
- Danièle Hervieu-Léger (1947-), French sociologist
- Bertrand Hervieu (1948-), French agronomist
- Francis Hervieu (1956-), French sprint canoer
- Dominique Hervieu (1963-), French dancer and choreographer
