= Giura =

Giura may refer to:

- Giura, a village in Bâcleș, Romania
- Alexandru Giura (born 1957), Romanian sprint canoer
- Luigi Giura, (1795–1865), Italian engineer and architect
