= Andrzej Klimaszewski =

Andrzej Klimaszewski is the name of:

- Andrzej Klimaszewski (canoeist) (born 1954), Polish sprint canoer
- Andrzej Klimaszewski (long jumper) (born 1960), Polish long jumper
