= John Traill (disambiguation) =

John Traill (1835–1897) was the owner of Traill's Temperance Coffee House

John Traill may also refer to:

- John S. Traill (born 1939), Canadian scholar
- John Traill Cargill (1867–1954), Scottish oil magnate
- John Traill Christie (1899–1980), British headmaster
- Johnny Traill (1882–1958), Irish–Argentine 10-goal polo player

== See also ==
- John Trail (born 1943), Australian sprint canoeist
- John Trailly (died 1400), English soldier and diplomat
- Traill (surname)
