= Anders Larsson =

Anders Larsson may refer to:

- Anders Larsson (wrestler) (1892–1945), Swedish freestyle wrestler
- Anders Larsson (canoeist) (born 1951), Swedish sprint canoer
- Anders Larsson (cross-country skier) (born 1961), Swedish cross-country skier
- Anders Larsson, screenwriter of Moomins and the Comet Chase
- Anders Larsson, music composer of Desmond & the Swamp Barbarian Trap
- Anders Larsson (singer) (born 1969), Swedish dancer
