= Neil Robson =

Neil Robson may refer to:

- Neil Robson (politician) (1928–2013), Tasmanian member of parliament, 1976–1992
- Neil Robson (canoeist) (born 1957), British sprint canoer
