= Baulch =

Baulch may refer to:

== People ==
- Crosbie Baulch (born 1959), Australian Olympic canoeist
- Douglas Baulch (1917–1996), Australian artist
- Jamie Baulch (born 1973), British Olympic sprinter

== Places ==
- Baulch Peak, Antarctic mountain
