= Albaching =

- Municipality
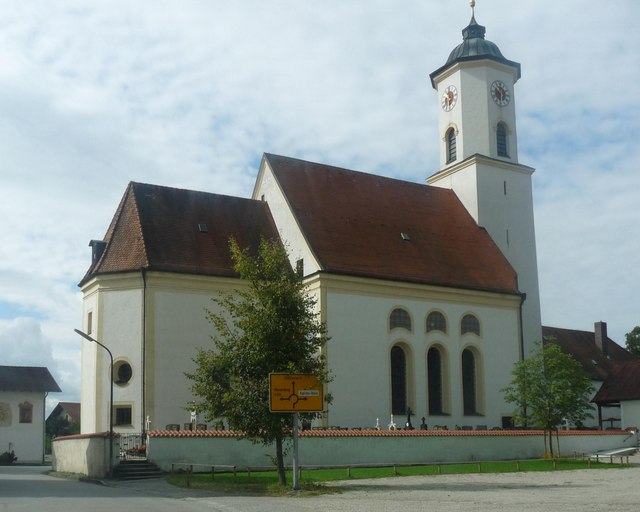
- Church of Saint Nicholas

- Coat of arms

- Location of Albaching within Rosenheim district
- Interactive map of Albaching
- Location within Germany Location within Bavaria
- Coordinates: 48°6′45″N 12°6′55″E
- Country: Germany
- State: Bavaria
- Admin. region: Oberbayern
- District: Rosenheim
- Municipal assoc.: Pfaffing

Government
  - Mayor (2020–26): Rudolf Schreyer (FW)

Area
  - Total: 18.16 km^{2} (7.01 sq mi)
- Elevation: 513 m (1,683 ft)

Population (2025-12-31)
  - Total: 1,735
  - Density: 95.54/km^{2} (247.4/sq mi)
- Time zone: UTC+01:00 (CET)
  - Summer (DST): UTC+02:00 (CEST)
- Postal codes: 83544
- Dialling codes: 08076
- Vehicle registration: RO
- Website: www.albaching.de

Albaching (German: [alˈbaxɪŋ]; locally known as 'Oibich') is a municipality in the district of Rosenheim in Bavaria in Germany.

== Geography ==
Albaching lies in the Alpine foothills, approximately 45 km east of Munich, 30 km south of Erding, 40 km south-west of Mühldorf am Inn, 12 km north-east of Wasserburg am Inn, 38 km north of Rosenheim und 13 km north-east of Ebersberg. The next railway station is in Forsting, a part of Pfaffing, where the railroad line Wasserburg – Grafing bei München can be reached.

=== Structure ===
The municipality Albaching has altogether 32 districts, amongst them the towns of Albaching, Kalteneck, Berg and Stetten. Also within its domain there are the hamlets Zell, Schönanger, Utzenbichl, Gröben, Fuchstal, Aign, Thal, Ödenau, Furth and Schacha as well as several isolated farms.

== History ==
The municipality was documented for the first time in 808 as Alpicha (and in 818 as Alpihha). In the 12th century the spellings "Albachingen" and "Alchingen" were documented. Since 1415 the parochial village was called "Albaching". There were no successful tries to document on where the name is derived from. Explanations include the name of the river "Albach", which is derived from the Indo-German "albh" (for white) and the Old-German "aha" (for water) but the river was called "Mühlbach" until the 19th century. Another theory cites the Roman nomen gentile "Albius" as the source for the name, which would imply a very early settling. Both theories are yet to be proven scientifically.

Albaching was part of the free "Grafschaft Haag" until 1804, which was in turn part of the Wittelsbach domain. In 1818 during an administrative reform in Bavaria Albaching was made an independent political entity. On May 1, 1978, the municipality Albaching was dissolved and integrated in the municipality of Pfaffing. After years of resistance and several negotiations Albaching received its independence again on January 1, 1994, and is since then in an administrative collective with Pfaffing.
