= New Zealand at the 1980 Summer Olympics =

- Athletes competed under the flag of the New Zealand Olympic and Commonwealth Games Association
- IOC code: NZL
- NOC: New Zealand Olympic and Commonwealth Games Association
- Website: www.olympic.org.nz

in Moscow
- Competitors: 5 (all men) in 2 sports
- Flag bearer: Brian Newth (modern pentathlete)
- Medals: Gold 0 Silver 0 Bronze 0 Total 0

Summer Olympics appearances (overview)
- 1908; 1912; 1920; 1924; 1928; 1932; 1936; 1948; 1952; 1956; 1960; 1964; 1968; 1972; 1976; 1980; 1984; 1988; 1992; 1996; 2000; 2004; 2008; 2012; 2016; 2020; 2024; 2028

Other related appearances
- Australasia (1908–1912)

New Zealand competed in the 1980 Summer Olympics in Moscow, USSR. In partial support of the US-led boycott, the banner of the NZOCGA was used instead of its national flag. Tay Wilson was the chef de mission. New Zealand's then largest team had been nominated with 99 competitors. However, only five New Zealand athletes competed as independents after the New Zealand government applied pressure to support the boycott.

== Background ==
The 1980 Summer Olympics were hosted by the Soviet Union. After the host country invaded Afghanistan in December 1979, American president Jimmy Carter called for a boycott of the Moscow Games. On 8 May 1980, the New Zealand Olympic Committee and Commonwealth Games Association (NZOCGA) accepted the invitation for New Zealand to participate in the Olympic Games. The Muldoon government stepped in and threatened the NZOCGA with funding cuts and cancelled leave for competitors who were in the public service. On 29 May, the NZOCGA announced that no sponsorship or government funds would be used to fund the New Zealand team in Moscow. On 3 June, the NZOCGA announced that it would not send the New Zealand team.

Four athletes decided to go as independents: a modern pentathlete and three canoers. The decision for the canoers was based on the fact that they did not receive funding from the NZOCGA anyway so were not subject to their (or the government's) threat of funding cuts. An estimated 200 New Zealand spectators travelled to Moscow in support of the New Zealand team. By the time it became known that New Zealanders competed in two sports only those events had sold out.

Of the other athletes, 61 attended other Olympic Games but the remaining 34 missed out completely; the 34 were:

Archery

- Garry Wright

Athletics

- Karen Page
- Mike Parker
- Kim Robertson

Cycling

- Kevin Blackwell
- Eric Mackenzie
- Jack Swart

Gymnastics

- Rowena Davis

Hockey

- Pat Barwick
- Christine Berry
- Sue Emerson
- Marianne Gray
- Allana Hiha
- Karen Thomas
- Janice Neil
- Judith Phillips
- Gail Rodbourn
- Edith Weber
- Jeff Gibson

Judo

- David Clark
- William (Bill) Vincent

Rowing

- Tony Brook
- Alan Cotter
- Stephen Donaldson
- Duncan Holland
- Peter Jansen
- Robert Robinson
- Anthony Russell

Shooting

- Jack Scott
- Wayne Williams

Swimming

- Melanie Jones
- Paul Rowe

Yachting

- Rick Dodson
- Andrew Knowles
- Gerald Sly

== Results by event ==
=== Canoeing ===
| Athlete | Event | Heats | | Repechages | | Semifinals | | Final | |
| Athlete | Event | Time | Rank | Time | Rank | Time | Rank | Time | Rank |
|---|---|---|---|---|---|---|---|---|---|
| Ian Ferguson | Men's K-1 500 m | 1:46.02 | 3 Q | —N/a | | 1:46.87 | 2 Q | 1:47.36 | 7 |
| Ian Ferguson | Men's K-1 1000 m | 3:59.07 | 6 R | 3:54.46 | 3 Q | 3:54.05 | 3 Q | 3:53.78 | 8 |
| Alan Thompson; Geoff Walker | Men's K-2 500 m | 1:39.30 | 6 R | 1:39.32 | 2 Q | 1:38.38 | 4 | did not advance | |
| Alan Thompson; Geoff Walker | Men's K-2 1000 m | 3:34.43 | 2 Q | —N/a | | 3:38.64 | 3 Q | 3:33.83 | 8 |
| Ian Ferguson; Paul MacDonald; Alan Thompson; Geoff Walker | Men's K-4 1000 m | DNS | | did not advance | | | | | |

=== Modern pentathlon ===
| Athlete | Riding | | Fencing | | Shooting | | Swimming | | Running | | Total points | Final rank |
| Athlete | Points | Rank | Points | Rank | Points | Rank | Points | Rank | Points | Rank | Total points | Final rank |
|---|---|---|---|---|---|---|---|---|---|---|---|---|
| Brian Newth | 1018 | 23 | 532 | 42 | 846 | =38 | 1048 | 39 | 1042 | 28 | 4486 | 40 |
