= Brian Haynes =

Brian Haynes may refer to:

- Brian Haynes (footballer) (born 1962), retired Trinidad soccer midfielder
- Brian Haynes (canoeist) (1951–2011), British sprint canoer
