= Hasselqvist =

Hasselqvist is a surname. Notable people with the surname include:

- Fredrik Hasselqvist, Swedish traveller and naturalist
- Kjell Hasselqvist (born 1949), Swedish canoeist
