= Salvietti =

Salvietti is an Italian surname. Notable people with the surname include:

- Agostino Salvietti (1882–1967), Italian actor
- Andrea Salvietti (born 1952), Italian sprint canoeist
- Armando Salvietti (born 1955), Bolivian sports shooter
- Graziano Salvietti (born 1956), Italian racing cyclist
- Niccolò Salvietti (born 1993), Italian racing cyclist
