= Hynninen =

Hynninen is a Finnish surname. Notable people with the surname include:

- Eero Hynninen (born 1953), Finnish sprint canoeist
- Helka Hynninen (1930–2017), Finnish singer and songwriter
- Jorma Hynninen (born 1941), Finnish opera singer
- Onni Hynninen (1910–2001), Finnish sport shooter
- Paavo Hynninen (1883–1960), Finnish diplomat
