= Hasselquist =

Hasselquist is a surname. Notable people with the surname include:

- Jenny Hasselquist (1894–1978), Swedish ballerina, actress, and ballet teacher
- Tuve Hasselquist (1816–1891), Swedish-American Lutheran minister

== See also ==
- Fredrik Hasselqvist (1722–1752), Swedish naturalist
- Kjell Hasselqvist (born 1949), Swedish sprint canoeist
