= Reisinger (surname) =

Reisinger is a surname. Notable people with the surname include:

- Andreas Reisinger (born 1963), Austrian footballer
- Dan Reisinger (1934–2019), Israeli designer
- Eduard Reisinger (born 1957), Austrian canoeist
- J. Monroe Reisinger (1842–1925), American soldier
- Julius Reisinger (1828–1892), Russian Ballet choreographer
- Stefan Reisinger (born 1981), German footballer
- Wilhelm Reisinger (born 1958), German footballer
- Wolfgang Reisinger (1955–2022), Austrian jazz musician
- Isaac Singer (1811-1875), American inventor, actor, and businessman (his father's name was originally Adam Reisinger)
