= Jacky Alders =

Belgian sprint canoer (born 1956)

Jacky Alders (born 28 January 1956) is a Belgian canoe sprinter who competed in the late 1970s and early 1980s. He was eliminated in the semifinals of the K-4 1000 m event at the 1976 Summer Olympics in Montreal. Four years later in Moscow, Alders was eliminated in the repechages of the K-2 500 m event.
