= Jean Fournel =

Canadian sprint canoer

Jean Fournel (July 13, 1956 – June 14, 1997) was a Canadian sprint canoer who competed in the mid-1970s. He competed in the K-4 1000 m event at the 1976 Summer Olympics in Montreal, but was eliminated in the semifinals.

Fournel's daughter, Émilie, competed for Canada in sprint canoe at the 2008 Summer Olympics in Beijing. Emilie and her brother Hugues Fournel both competed for Canada in sprint canoe at the 2012 Summer Olympics in London.
