= Sakari Peltonen =

Swedish canoeist (born 1954)

(Zakari) Sakari Peltonen (born January 2, 1954, in Södertälje) is a Swedish sprint canoer who competed in the mid-1970s. He was eliminated in the semifinals of the K-4 1000 m event at the 1976 Summer Olympics in Montreal.
