= Ken Vidler =

Australian canoeist (born 1954)

Ken Vidler (born 28 April 1954) is an Australian sprint canoeist who competed in the early 1980s. At the 1980 Summer Olympics in Moscow, he finished eighth in the K-4 1000 m event.

Vidler was born in Perth, and grew up in Scarborough, Western Australia where in 1967 he joined the 'Scarboro Surf Lifesaving Club' in 1967.

Before his Olympic representation Vidler was, according to the Western Australian Institute of Sport (WAIS), "Australia's most-decorated surf lifesaving representative when he retired from top-level competition." In a career that spanned 23 years at junior and senior level, he won 50 medals. He won the Australian Ironman Title, held at the Australian Surf Life Saving Championships every year, in 1973, 1975 and 1976, after winning the junior iron man titles in 1971 and 1972.
