= Steven Hancock =

British canoeist

Stephen Patrick "Steven" Hancock (25 June 1957 – 24 June 2016) was a British canoe sprinter who competed in the early 1980s. At the 1980 Summer Olympics in Moscow, he was eliminated in the semifinals of the K-4 1000 m event.

Hancock resided in Toronto with his family. He was CEO of VidWrx Inc., an Internet video production company. An avid cyclist, he was also a member of two clubs.

Hancock died on 24 June 2016 from injuries he sustained when a car struck his bicycle in Mississauga, Ontario, on 7 June. Hancock was placed on life support; however, his condition worsened and he died on the eve of his 59th birthday.
