= Jürgen Bohr =

West German sprint canoer (born 1953)

Jürgen Bohr (born 5 December 1953 in Merzig) is a West German sprint canoer who competed in the mid-1970s. He finished ninth in the K-4 1000 m event at the 1976 Summer Olympics in Montreal.
