= László Szabó (canoeist) =

Hungarian sprint canoer (1953–2016)

Medal record

Men's canoe sprint

World Championships
Bronze medal – third place	1979 Duisburg	K-4 10000 m

László Szabó (2 November 1953 – August 2016) was a Hungarian sprint canoeist who competed in the late 1970s and early 1980s. He won a bronze medal in the K-4 10000 m at the 1979 ICF Canoe Sprint World Championships in Duisburg. Szabó also finished eighth in the K-2 500 m event at the 1980 Summer Olympics in Moscow.
