= Antonio Mastrandrea =

Italian canoeist

Antonio Mastrandrea (born 26 May 1961) is an Italian sprint canoeist who competed in the early 1980s. At the 1980 Summer Olympics in Moscow, he finished ninth in the men's K-2 1000 m event and was eliminated in the semifinals of the men's K-2 500 m event.
