= Herbert Havlik =

Austrian canoeist

Herbert Havlik (born 24 November 1946 in Korneuburg) is an Austrian sprint canoeist who competed in the early 1980s. He was eliminated in the semifinals of both the K-2 1000 m and the K-4 1000 m events at the 1980 Summer Olympics in Moscow.
