= Kazimierz Górecki =

Medal record

Men's canoe sprint

World Championships
Bronze medal – third place	1974 Mexico City	K-1 4 x 500 m
Bronze medal – third place	1974 Mexico City	K-4 10000 m

Kazimierz Górecki (January 17, 1954 - June 26, 1977) was a Polish sprint canoer who competed in the mid-1970s. He won two bronze medals at the 1974 ICF Canoe Sprint World Championships in Mexico City, earning them in the K-1 4 x 500 m and K-4 10000 m events.

Górecki also finished fifth in the K-4 1000 m event at the 1976 Summer Olympics in Montreal.

Górecki was born in Strączno. His wife, Maria, also competed as a sprint canoer in the 1970s.
