= Christopher Ballard =

British sprint canoer

Christopher Neil Ballard (born 10 October 1958) is a British canoe sprinter who competed in the early to mid-1980s. At the 1980 Summer Olympics in Moscow, he was eliminated in the semifinals of both the K-2 500 m and the K-2 1000 m events.
