= Jostein Stige =

Norwegian canoeist (born 1954)

Jostein Stige (born August 18, 1954 in Oslo) is a Norwegian sprint canoer who competed in the mid-1970s. He finished sixth in the K-4 1000 m event at the 1976 Summer Olympics in Montreal.
