= Nikolai Nachev =

Bulgarian sprint canoer (born 1955)

Nikolai Nachev (Bulgarian: Николай Начев) (born 20 February 1955) is a Bulgarian sprint canoeist who competed in the mid-1970s. He finished seventh in K-4 1000 m event at the 1976 Summer Olympics in Montreal.
