= Graham Gilles =

Australian canoeist

Graham Gillies (born 25 November 1946) is an Australian canoe sprinter who competed in the mid-1970s. He was eliminated in the semifinals of the K-4 1000 m event at the 1976 Summer Olympics in Montreal.
