= Harald Nilsen =

Norwegian canoeist (born 1955)

Harald Nilsen (born February 9, 1955) is a Norwegian sprint canoer who competed in the mid-1970s. At the 1976 Summer Olympics in Montreal, he was eliminated in the semifinals of the K-1 500 m event.
