= Håkan Mattson =

Swedish canoeist (born 1952)

Håkon Ronny Mattsson (born September 10, 1952 in Gothenburg) is a Swedish sprint canoeist who competed in the mid-1970s. He was eliminated in the semifinals of the K-4 1000 m event at the 1976 Summer Olympics, in Montreal.
