= Helmar Mang =

German canoeist

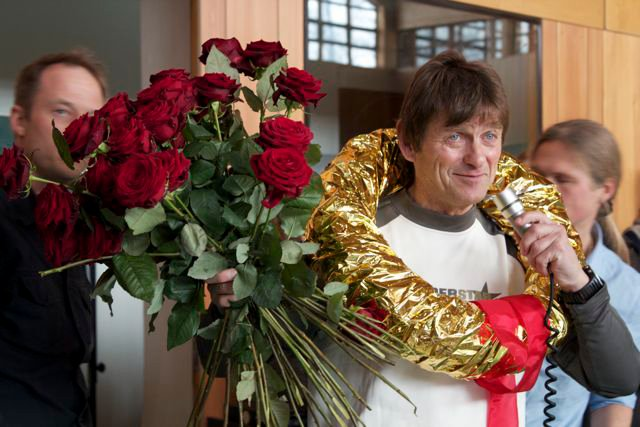
Helmar Mang

Helmar Mang (born October 8, 1948) is a West German sprint canoer who competed in the mid-1970s. He finished ninth in the K-4 1000 m event at the 1976 Summer Olympics in Montreal.
