= José Ramón López =

Spanish canoeist

Medal record

Men's canoe sprint

Olympic Games
Silver medal – second place	1976 Montreal	K-4 1000 m

World Championships
Gold medal – first place	1975 Belgrade	K-4 1000 m
Silver medal – second place	1978 Belgrade	K-4 500 m
Bronze medal – third place	1975 Belgrade	K-1 4 x 500 m
Bronze medal – third place	1977 Sofia	K-4 500 m
Bronze medal – third place	1977 Sofia	K-4 1000 m
Bronze medal – third place	1978 Belgrade	K-4 1000 m

José Ramón López (born 22 November 1950) is a Spanish sprint canoer who competed in the mid to late 1970s. He won a silver medal in the K-4 1000 m event at the 1976 Summer Olympics in Montreal.

López also won six medals at the ICF Canoe Sprint World Championships with a gold (K-4 1000 m: 1975), a silver (K-4 500 m: 1978), and four bronzes (K-1 4 x 500 m: 1975, K-4 500 m: 1977, K-4 1000 m: 1977, 1978).
