= Edgar Hartung =

German canoeist (born 1956)

Edgar Hartung (born 15 November 1956 in Mainz) is a West German sprint canoer who competed in the mid-1970s. He finished ninth in the K-4 1000 m event at the 1976 Summer Olympics in Montreal.
