= Dietmar Schlöglmann =

Austrian canoeist

Dietmar Schlöglmann (born 13 January 1955) is an Austrian sprint canoer who competed in the early 1980s. He was eliminated in the semifinals of both the K-2 1000 m and the K-4 1000 m events at the 1980 Summer Olympics in Moscow.
