= Torbjörn Thoresson =

Swedish sprint canoer (born 1959)

Medal record

Men's canoe sprint

World Championships
Silver medal – second place	1985 Mechelen	K-4 10000 m

Nils Torbjörn Thoresson (born December 29, 1959) is a Swedish sprint canoer who competed from the early to mid-1980s. He won a silver medal in the K-4 10000 m event at the 1985 ICF Canoe Sprint World Championships in Mechelen.

Thoresson also finished ninth in the K-4 1000 m event at the 1980 Summer Olympics in Moscow.
