= Patrick Berard =

French sprint canoer (born 1959)

Patrick Bérard (born 10 December 1959) is a French sprint canoer who competed in the early 1980s. At the 1980 Summer Olympics in Moscow, he finished sixth in the K-4 1000 m event.
