= Brent Turner =

American canoeist

Brent Turner (born February 25, 1954) is an American sprint canoer who competed in the mid-1970s. He was eliminated in the repechages of the K-4 1000 m event at the 1976 Summer Olympics in Montreal.
