= Nicolae Simionenco =

Romanian sprint canoer (born 1952)

Nicolae Simionenco (born July 15, 1952) is a Romanian sprint canoer who competed in the mid-1970s. He finished fourth in the K-4 1000 m event at the 1976 Summer Olympics in Montreal.
