= József Kosztyán =

Hungarian canoeist (born 1955)

József Kosztyán (born February 11, 1955) is a Hungarian sprint canoer who competed in the 1970s and 1980s. At the 1980 Summer Olympics in Moscow, he finished fifth in the K-4 1000 m event.
