= Aleksandr Degtyarev =

Soviet canoeist (born 1955)

Medal record

Men's canoe sprint

Olympic Games
Gold medal – first place	1976 Montreal	K-4 1000 m

World Championships
Silver medal – second place	1974 Mexico City	K-4 1000 m

Aleksandr Degtyarev (born 26 March 1955) is a Soviet sprint canoeist who competed in the 1970s. He won a gold medal in the K-4 1000 m event at the 1976 Summer Olympics in Montreal.

Degtyarev also won a silver in the K-4 1000 m event at the 1974 ICF Canoe Sprint World Championships in Mexico City.
