= Rob van Weerdenburg =

Dutch canoeist (born 1955)

Rob van Weerdenburg (born 8 February 1955, Amsterdam) is a Dutch sprint canoer who competed in the early 1980s. At the 1980 Summer Olympics in Moscow, he was eliminated in the semifinals of the K-4 1000 m event.
