= Nicolae Țicu =

Romanian sprint canoer (born 1953)

Medal record

Men's canoe sprint

World Championships
Bronze medal – third place	1977 Sofia	K-2 10000 m
Bronze medal – third place	1978 Belgrade	K-4 10000 m

Nicolae Tico (born 4 June 1953) is a Romanian sprint canoer who competed in the late 1970s and in the early 1980s. He won two bronze medals at the ICF Canoe Sprint World Championships (K-2 10000 m: 1977, K-4 10000 m: 1978), and finished fourth in the K-2 1000 m event at the 1980 Summer Olympics in Moscow.
