= Viktor Podloucký =

Czech sprint canoer (born 1950)

Viktor Podloucký (born 3 December 1950 in Děčín) is a Czech sprint canoer who competed for Czechoslovakia in the mid-1970s. He was eliminated in the semifinals of the K-4 1000 m event at the 1976 Summer Olympics in Montreal.
