= Luciano Buonfiglio =

Italian sprint canoer

President of CONI
- Incumbent
- Assumed office 26 June 2025
- Preceded by: Giovanni Malagò

Personal details
- Born: 15 November 1950 (age 75) Naples, Italy
- Occupation: Sports executive

Luciano Buonfiglio (born November 15, 1950) is an Italian sprint canoer who competed in the mid-1970s. He was eliminated in the repechages of the K-4 1000 m event at the 1976 Summer Olympics in Montreal, Quebec.

As of 2009, Buonfiglio is treasurer of the International Canoe Federation.

Since 26 June 2025, he is President of the Italian National Olympic Committee (CONI).
