= Ng Tsuen Man =

Hong Kong sprint canoer

Ng Tsuen Man (born June 11, 1948) is a Hong Kong sprint canoer who competed from the mid-1970s to the mid-1980s. At the 1976 Summer Olympics in Montreal, he was eliminated in the repechages of both the K-1 500 m and the K-4 1000 m events. Eight years later in Los Angeles, Ng was eliminated in the repechages of the K-4 1000 m event.
