= Dionys Thalmann =

Swiss canoeist

Dionysius "Dionys" Thalmann (born 30 October 1953) is a Swiss sprint canoer who competed in the early to mid-1980s. At the 1980 Summer Olympics in Moscow, he was eliminated in the repechages of the K-2 500 m event and the semifinals of the K-2 1000 m event.
