= Vassil Chilingirov =

Bulgarian sprint canoer

Vasil Chilingirov (Bulgarian: Васил Чилингиров) (born July 17, 1951) is a Bulgarian sprint canoer who competed in the early to mid-1970s. Competing in two Summer Olympics, he earned his best finish of seventh in the K-4 1000 m event at Montreal in 1976.
