= Zoltán Romhányi =

Hungarian sprint canoer (born 1954)

Medal record

Men's canoe sprint

World Championships
Silver medal – second place	1974 Mexico City	K-4 10000 m
Bronze medal – third place	1979 Duisburg	K-4 10000 m

Zoltán Romhányi (born 22 February 1954) is a Hungarian sprint canoeist who competed from the mid-1970s to the early 1980s. He won two medals in the K-4 10000 m at the ICF Canoe Sprint World Championships with a silver in 1974 and a bronze in 1979.

Romhányi also competed in two Summer Olympics, earning his best finish of eighth twice (K-2 500 m: 1980, K-4 1000 m: 1976).
