= Eduard Reisinger =

Austrian canoeist (born 1957)

Eduard Reisinger (born 12 June 1957 in Pfaffing) is an Austrian sprint canoer who competed in the early 1980s. At the 1980 Summer Olympics in Moscow, he was eliminated in the semi-finals of the K-4 1000 m event.
