= José María Esteban =

Spanish canoeist

Medal record

Men's canoe sprint

Olympic Games
Silver medal – second place	1976 Montreal	K-4 1000 m

World Championships
Gold medal – first place	1975 Belgrade	K-4 1000 m
Silver medal – second place	1978 Belgrade	K-4 500 m
Bronze medal – third place	1977 Sofia	K-4 1000 m
Bronze medal – third place	1978 Belgrade	K-4 1000 m

José María Esteban (born 27 May 1954) is a Spanish sprint canoer who competed in the mid to late 1970s. Competing in two Summer Olympics, he won a silver medal in the K-4 1000 m event at Montreal in 1976.

Esteban also won four medals at the ICF Canoe Sprint World Championships with a gold (K-4 1000 m: 1975), a silver (K-4 500 m: 1978), and two bronzes (K-4 1000 m: 1977, 1978).
