= Jens Nordqvist =

Swedish canoeist (born 1959)

Medal record

Men's canoe sprint

World Championships
Silver medal – second place	1981 Nottingham	K-4 500 m
Bronze medal – third place	1982 Belgrade	K-4 500 m

Jens Nordqvist (born July 3, 1959) is a Swedish sprint canoer who competed in the early 1980s. He won two medals in the K-4 500 m event at the ICF Canoe Sprint World Championships with a silver in 1981 and a bronze in 1982.

Nordqvist also competing at the 1980 Summer Olympics in Moscow, finishing ninth in the K-2 500 m event while being eliminated in the semifinals of the K-2 1000 m event.
