= Harry Nolte =

German canoeist

Medal record

Men's canoe sprint

World Championships
Bronze medal – third place	1986 Montreal	K-1 1000 m

Harry Nolte (born 11 June 1961 in Zwickau) is an East German sprint canoeist who competed in the 1980s. He won two a bronze medal in the K-1 1000 m event at the 1986 ICF Canoe Sprint World Championships in Montreal.

Nolte also finished fifth in the K-2 1000 m event at the 1980 Summer Olympics in Moscow.
