= Peter Patasi =

Canadian canoeist (born 1948)

Peter Patasi (born March 17, 1948) is a Canadian sprint canoer who competed in the mid-1970s. He was eliminated in the semifinals of the K-4 1000 m event at the 1976 Summer Olympics in Montreal.
