= Olaf Søyland =

Norwegian canoeist

Medal record

Men's canoe sprint

World Championships
Gold medal – first place	1975 Belgrade	K-4 10000 m
Gold medal – first place	1979 Duisburg	K-2 1000 m
Silver medal – second place	1978 Belgrade	K-2 1000 m

Olaf Søyland (born 28 July 1952) is a Norwegian sprint canoer who competed in the mid to late 1970s. He was born in Flekkefjord. He won three medals at the ICF Canoe Sprint World Championships with two golds (K-2 1000 m: 1979, K-4 10000 m: 1975) and a silver (K-2 1000 m: 1978). Søyland also finished sixth in the K-4 1000 m event at the 1976 Summer Olympics in Montreal.
