= Pfaffing (Verwaltungsgemeinschaft) =

- Verwaltungsgemeinschaft
- Location of Pfaffing within Rosenheim district
- Interactive map of Pfaffing
- Location within Germany Location within Bavaria
- Coordinates: 48°03′N 12°07′E
- Country: Germany
- State: Bavaria
- Admin. region: Upper Bavaria
- District: Rosenheim
- Seat: Pfaffing
- Subdivisions: 2 municipalities

Area
  - Total: 53.55 km^{2} (20.68 sq mi)

Population (2025-12-31)
  - Total: 5,743
  - Density: 107.2/km^{2} (277.8/sq mi)
- Time zone: UTC+01:00 (CET)
  - Summer (DST): UTC+02:00 (CEST)
- Website: www.pfaffing.de

Pfaffing is a Verwaltungsgemeinschaft (municipal association) in the district of Rosenheim in Bavaria, Germany. Its seat is in Pfaffing.

It consists of the following municipalities:

1. Albaching
2. Pfaffing
