= Jiří Svoboda (canoeist) =

Czechoslovak sprint canoeist (born 1954)

Jiří Svoboda (born April 22, 1954) is a Czechoslovak sprint canoeist who competed in the late 1970s and early 1980s. He was eliminated in the semifinals of the K-4 1000 m event at the 1976 Summer Olympics in Montreal. Four years later in Moscow, Svoboda was eliminated in the semifinals of both the K-2 500 m and the K-2 1000 m event.
