= Kwan Honk Wai =

Hong Kong sprint canoer

Kwan Honk Wai (born February 24, 1953) is a Hongkonger sprint canoer who competed in the mid 1970s. He was eliminated in the repechages of the K-4 1000 m event at the 1976 Summer Olympics in Montreal, Quebec, Canada.

== See also ==
- Hong Kong at the 1976 Summer Olympics
