= Anthony Alan-Williams =

British sprint canoer (born 1947)

Anthony Alan-Williams (born 13 January 1947 in Portsmouth, England) is a British canoe sprinter who competed in the mid-1970s. He was eliminated in the semifinals of the K-4 1000 m event at the 1976 Summer Olympics in Montreal.
