= Chris van Eeden =

West German sprint canoer (born 1956)

Chris van Eeden (born 17 December 1956) is a West German sprint canoer who competed in the mid-1970s. He finished ninth in the K-4 1000 m event at the 1976 Summer Olympics in Montreal.
