= Vladimir Ivanovich Morozov (born 1952) =

Medal record

Men's canoe sprint

Representing Soviet Union

Olympic Games
| Gold medal – first place | 1976 Montreal | K-4 1000 m |

World Championships
| Gold medal – first place | 1977 Sofia | K-4 10000 m |
| Gold medal – first place | 1978 Belgrade | K-4 10000 m |
| Gold medal – first place | 1979 Duisburg | K-4 10000 m |
| Silver medal – second place | 1977 Sofia | K-4 1000 m |

Vladimir Ivanovich Morozov (Russian: Владимир Иванович Морозов) (Sometimes shown as Vladimir Morosov, born 19 June 1952 in Moscow Oblast) was a Soviet sprint canoeist who competed in the late 1970s. He won a gold medal in the K-4 1000 m event at the 1976 Summer Olympics in Montreal, Quebec, Canada.

Morozov also won four medals at the ICF Canoe Sprint World Championships with three golds (K-4 10000 m: 1977, 1978, 1979) and a silver (K-4 1000 m: 1977).
