= Italian National Olympic Committee =

- Country: Italy
- Code: ITA
- Created: 1914
- Recognized: 1915
- Continental Association: EOC
- Headquarters: Rome, Italy
- President: Luciano Buonfiglio
- Website: www.coni.it

Former Italian National Olympic Committee logo

Italia Team logo

The Italian National Olympic Committee (Italian: Comitato Olimpico Nazionale Italiano, CONI; IOC Code: ITA), founded in 1914 and a member of the International Olympic Committee (IOC), is responsible for the development and management of sports activity in Italy. Within Italy, CONI recognizes 48 national sports federations, 15 associate sports disciplines, 14 promotional sports organizations, and 19 organizations for the betterment of sports.

In total 95,000 sports clubs with 11,000,000 members are recognized. Its 2016 annual budget is 412,900,000 euros which is primarily funded by the Italian government.

== Member organizations of CONI ==
=== National sport federations (FSN) ===
- Automobile Club of Italy (Italian: Automobile Club d'Italia (ACI))
- Aviation Club of Italy (Italian: Aero Club d'Italia (AeCI))
- Federazione Italiana Canoa Kayak (FICK)
- Federazione Italiana Cronometristi (FICr)
- Federazione Italiana Danza Sportiva (FIDS)
- Federazione Italiana Discipline Armi Sportive da Caccia (FIDASC)
- Federazione Italiana Judo Lotta Karate Arti Marziali (FIJLKAM)
- Federazione Italiana Motonautica (FIM)
- Federazione Italiana Pentathlon Moderno (FIPM)
- Federazione Italiana Pesca Sportiva E Attività Subacquee (FIPSAS)
- Federazione Italiana Pesistica e Cultura Fisica (FIPCF)
- Federazione Italiana Sci Nautico (FISN)
- Federazione Italiana Sport del Ghiaccio (FISG)
- Federazione Italiana Tiro a Volo (FITAV)
- Federazione Italiana Tiro con L'Arco (FITARCO)
- Italian Athletics Federation (FIDAL - Federazione Italiana d'Atletica Leggera)
- Italian Badminton Federation (Italian: Federazione Italiana Badminton (FIBa))
- Italian Baseball and Softball Federation (FIBS - Federazione Italiana Baseball Softball)
- Italian Basketball Federation (Italian: Federazione Italiana Pallacanestro (FIP))
- Italian Bocce Federation (Italian: Federazione Italiana Bocce (FIB))
- Italian Boxing Federation (Italian: Federazione Pugilistica Italiana (FPI))
- Italian Cycling Federation (Italian: Federazione Ciclistica Italiana (FCI))
- Italian Equestrian Federation (Italian: Federazione Italiana Sport Equestri (FISE))
- Italian Fencing Federation (Italian: Federazione Italiana Scherma (FIS))
- Italian Hockey Federation (Italian: Federazione Italiana Hockey (FIH))
- Italian Football Federation (FIGC - Federazione Italiana Giuoco Calcio)
- Italian Gymnastics Federation (Italian: Federazione Ginnastica d'Italia (FGdI))
- Italian Golf Federation (Italian: Federazione Italiana Golf (FIG))
- Italian Handball Federation (Italian: Federazione Italiana Giuoco Handball (FIGH))
- Italian Motorcycle Federation (Italian: Federazione Motociclistica Italiana (FMI))
- Italian Paralympic Committee (Italian: Comitato Italiano Paralimpico (CIP))
- Italian Hockey and Skating Federation (Italian: Federazione Italiana Hockey E Pattinaggio (FIHP))
- Italian Rowing Federation (Italian: Federazione Italiana Canottaggio (FIC))
- Italian Rugby Federation (FIR - Federazione Italiana Rugby)
- Italian Sailing Federation (Italian: Federazione Italiana Vela (FIV))
- Italian Shooting Union (Italian: Unione Italiana Tiro a Segno (UITS)
- Italian Sports Medical Federation (Italian: Federazione Medico Sportiva Italiana (FMSI))
- Italian Squash Federation (Italian: Federazione Italiana Giuoco Squash (FIGS))
- Italian Table Tennis Federation (Italian: Federazione Italiana Tennistavolo (FITET))
- Italian Swimming Federation (Italian: Federazione Italiana Nuoto (FIN))
- Italian Taekwondo Federation (Italian: Federazione Italiana Taekwondo (FITA))
- Italian Tennis Federation (Italian: Federazione Italiana Tennis (FIT))
- Italian Triathlon Federation (Italian: Federazione Italiana Triathlon (FITRI))
- Italian Volleyball Federation (Italian: Federazione Italiana Pallavolo (FIPAV))
- Italian Winter Sports Federation (Italian: Federazione Italiana Sport Invernali) (FISI)

=== Associate sport disciplines (DSA) ===
- Italian Sport Climbing Federation (Italian: Federazione Arrampicata Sportiva Italiana (FASI))
- Italian Billiards Federation (Italian: Federazione Italiana Biliardo Sportivo (FIBiS))
- Italian Bowling Federation (Italian: Federazione Italiana Sport Bowling (FISB))
- Italian Bridge Federation (Italian: Federazione Italiana Gioco Bridge (FIGB))
- Italian Cricket Federation (Italian: Federazione Cricket Italiana (FCrI))
- Italian Checkers Federation (Italian: Federazione Italiana Dama (FID))
- Federazione Italiana Giochi e Sport Tradizionali (FIGEST)
- Federazione Itailana Sport Orientamento (FISO)
- Federazione Italiana Palla Tamburello (FIPT)
- Federazione Italiana Pallapugno (FIPAP)
- Italian Chess Federation (Italian: Federazione Scacchistica Italiana (FSI))
- Federazione Italiana Canottaggio Sedile Fisso (FICSF)
- Federazione Italiana Wushu-Kung Fu (FIWuK)
- Federazione Italiana Kickboxing MuayThai Savate Shoot Boxe Sambo (FEDERKOMBAT)
- Italian Twirling Federation (Italian: Federazione Italiana Twirling (FITw))
- Federazione Italiana Turismo Equestre Trec - Ante (FITETREC-ANTE)

=== Promotional organizations ===
- Association of Culture, Sport and Leisure Time (Italian: Associazione di cultura, sport e tempo libero (A.C.S.I.))
- Alleanza Sportiva Italiana (A.S.I.)
- Centro Nazionale Sportivo Libertas (C.N.S. Libertas)
- Centro Sportivo Educativo Nazionale (C.S.E.N.)
- Centro Universitario Sportivo Italiano (C.U.S.I.)
- Movimento Sport Azzurro Italia (MSP Italia)
- Unione Sportiva ACLI (U.S.ACLI)
- Associazione Italiana Cultura Sport (A.I.C.S.)
- Centri Sportivi Aziendali Industriali (C.S.A.IN.)
- Centro Sportivo Italiano (C.S.I.)
- Ente Nazionale Democratico di Azione Sociale (E.N.D.A.S.)
- Polisportive Giovanili Salesiane (P.G.S.)
- Unione Italiana Sport Per tutti (U.I.S.P.)

=== Betterment organizations ===
- Associazione Medaglie d'Oro al Valore Atletico (A.M.O.V.A.)
- Associazione Nazionale Atleti Olimpici e Azzurri d'Italia (A.N.A.O.A.I.)
- Associazione Nazionale Promozione Sportiva nelle Comunità (A.N.P.S.C.)
- Italian National Olympic Academy (Italian: Accademia Olimpica Nazionale Italiana (A.O.N.I.))
- Association of CONI Pensioners (Italian: Associazione Pensionati CONI (A.Pe.C.))
- Collegio Nazionale Professori Educazione Fisica e Sportiva (CONAPEFS)
- Italian Sports Committee Against Drugs (Italiano: Comitato Italiano Sport Contro Droga (C.I.S.D.))
- Italian Committee for Fair Play (Italian: Comitato Nazionale Italiano per il Fair Play (C.N.I.F.P.))
- Federazione Italiana Dirigenti Sportivi (F.I.DI.S.)
- Federazione Italiana Educatori Fisici e Sportivi (F.I.E.F.S.)
- Unione Nazionale Veterani dello Sport (U.N.V.S.)
- Italian Sports Press Union (Italian: Unione Stampa Sportiva Italiana (U.S.S.I.))
- Unione Italiana Collezionisti Olimpici e Sportivi (U.I.C.O.S.)
- Associazione Nazionale Stelle, Palme e Collari d'Oro al Merito del CONI e del CIP (A.N.S.Me.S.)
- Federazione Italiana Sportiva Istituti Attività Educative (F.I.S.I.A.E.)
- Società per la Consulenenza e per l'Assistenza nell'Impiantistica Sportiva (S.C.A.I.S.)
- Special Olympics Italia (S.O.I.)
- Unione Nazionale Associazione Sportive Centenarie d'Italia (U.N.A.S.C.I.)
- Centro di Studi per l'Educazione Fisica e l'Attività Sportiva (CE.S.E.F.A.S.)

== Honours ==
=== Orders ===
The Golden Collar of Sports Merit (Collare d'Oro al Merito Sportivo) is the highest honor awarded by the Italian National Olympic Committee. The award was created in 1995.

- CONI: Golden Collar of Sports Merit: Collare d'Oro al Merito Sportivo.

Among the other honors of the Italian National Olympic Committee, in addition to the above-mentioned, we find:

- Star of Sports Merit: Stella al Merito Sportivo
- Medal of Athletic Valor: Medaglia al Valore Atletico
- Palma of Technical Merit: Palma al Merito Tecnico

== List of presidents ==
- Carlo Compans de Brichanteau (1914–1920)
- Carlo Montù (1920–1921)
- Francesco Mauro (1921–1923)
- Aldo Finzi (1923–1925)
- Lando Ferretti (1925–1928)
- Augusto Turati (1928–1930)
- Iti Bacci (1930–1931)
- Leandro Arpinati (1931–1933)
- Achille Starace (1933–1939)
- Rino Parenti (1939–1940)
- Raffaele Manganiello (1940–1943)
- Alberto Bonacossa (1943)
- Giulio Onesti (1944–1978)
- Franco Carraro (1978–1987)
- Arrigo Gattai (1987–1993)
- Mario Pescante (1993–1998)
- Bruno Grandi (1998–1999)
- Gianni Petrucci (1999–2013)
- Giovanni Malagò (2013–2025)
- Luciano Buonfiglio (since 2025)

== See also ==
- Italy at the Olympics
- Sandro Donati anti-doping advocate
