= Per Lundh =

Swedish sprint canoer (born 1958)

Medal record

Men's canoe sprint

Representing Sweden

World Championships
Bronze medal – third place	1985 Mechelen	K-4 500 m

Per Lundh (born April 4, 1958) is a Swedish sprint canoer who competed in the early to mid-1980s. He won a bronze medal in the K-4 500 m event at the 1985 ICF Canoe Sprint World Championships in Mechelen.

Lundh also finished ninth in the K-4 1000 m event at the 1980 Summer Olympics in Moscow.
