= Frank-Peter Bischof =

East German canoe racer

Medal record

Men's canoe sprint

Representing East Germany

Olympic Games
Bronze medal – third place	1976 Montreal	K-4 1000 m

World Championships
Gold medal – first place	1978 Belgrade	K-4 500 m
Gold medal – first place	1981 Nottingham	K-4 1000 m
Silver medal – second place	1982 Belgrade	K-4 500 m
Silver medal – second place	1982 Belgrade	K-4 1000 m
Bronze medal – third place	1981 Nottingham	K-4 500 m

Frank-Peter Bischof (sometimes listed as Frank Bischof or Peter Bischof, born 20 August 1954, in Forst) is an East German canoe sprinter who competed in the late 1970s and early 1980s.

== Career ==
Competing in two Summer Olympics, he won a bronze medal in the K-4 1000 m event at Montreal in 1976.

Bischof also won five medals at the ICF Canoe Sprint World Championships with two golds (K-4 500 m: 1978, K-4 1000 m: 1981), two silvers (K-4 500 m and K-4 1000 m: both 1982), and a bronze (K-4 500 m: 1981).

== Personal life ==
His wife, Martina, won the gold in the women's K-2 500 m event at the 1980 Summer Olympics in Moscow.
