= Jürgen Lehnert =

East German canoe racer

Medal record

Men's canoe sprint

Olympic Games
Bronze medal – third place	1976 Montreal	K-4 1000 m

World Championships
Gold medal – first place	1974 Mexico City	K-4 1000 m
Bronze medal – third place	1973 Tampere	K-4 1000 m

Jürgen Lehnert (born 2 November 1954) is an East German canoe sprinter who competed in the mid to late 1970s. He won a bronze medal in the K-4 1000 m event at the 1976 Summer Olympics in Montreal.

Lehnert also won two medals in the K-4 1000 m event at the ICF Canoe Sprint World Championships with a gold in 1974 and a bronze in 1973.
