= Hans Eich =

West German sprint canoer (born 1949)

Hans Eich (born 17 May 1949) is a West German sprint canoer, who competed in the mid-1970s. At the 1976 Summer Olympics in Montreal, he was eliminated in the semifinals of both the K-1 500 m and the K-1 1000 m events.
