= Lou Tollas =

Canadian canoeist (born 1946)

Lou Tollas (born April 6, 1946 in Mikepércs) is a Canadian sprint canoer who competed in the mid-1970s. He was eliminated in the semifinals of the K-4 1000 m event at the 1976 Summer Olympics in Montreal.
