= José Marrero =

Cuban canoeist (born 1957)

José Marrero Hernández (born March 19, 1957) is a Cuban sprint canoer who competed in the early 1980s. At the 1980 Summer Olympics in Moscow, he finished sixth in the K-2 1000 m event while being eliminated in the semifinals of the K-2 500 m event.
