= Gaetan Frys =

Belgian canoeist

Gaëtan Frys (Anseremme, 21 February 1955) is a Belgian canoe sprinter who competed from the mid-1970s to the early 1980s. At the 1976 Summer Olympics in Montreal, he was eliminated in the semifinals of the K-1 500 m event. Four years later in Moscow, Frys was eliminated in the repechages of the K-2 500 m event.
