= Vladimír Dolejš =

Czech sprint canoer

Vladimír Dolejš (born 7 September 1955 in Prague) is a Czech sprint canoer who competed for Czechoslovakia in the late 1970s and early 1980s. He was eliminated in the semifinals of the K-4 1000 m event at the 1976 Summer Olympics in Montreal. Four years later in Moscow, Dolejš was eliminated in the semifinals of both the K-2 500 m and the K-2 1000 m event.
