= Henry Krawczyk =

American sprint canoer (born 1946)

Henry Krawczyk (born May 29, 1946 in Poland) is an American sprint canoer who competed in the mid-1970s. At the 1976 Summer Olympics in Montreal, he was eliminated in the repechages of the K-1 500 m event.
