= Peter Ammann =

Swiss sprint canoeist (born 1957)

Peter Ammann (born 5 February 1957) is a Swiss sprint canoer who competed in the early to mid-1980s. At the 1980 Summer Olympics in Moscow, he was eliminated in the repechages of the K-2 500 m event and the semifinals of the K-2 1000 m event. Four years later in Los Angeles, Ammann was eliminated in the repechages of the K-2 500 m event and the semifinals of the K-4 1000 m event.
