= Sergey Lizunov =

Soviet sprint canoer

Sergey Nikolayevich Lizunov (Russian: Сергей Николаевич Лизунов; July 4, 1955 – 2003) was a Soviet sprint canoer who competed in the mid-1970s. At the 1976 Summer Olympics in Montreal, he finished sixth in the K-1 500 m event.
