= Bernd Duvigneau =

East German canoeist

Medal record

Men's canoe sprint

Olympic Games
Gold medal – first place	1980 Moscow	K-4 1000 m
Bronze medal – third place	1976 Montreal	K-4 1000 m

World Championships
Gold medal – first place	1974 Mexico City	K-4 1000 m
Gold medal – first place	1978 Belgrade	K-4 500 m
Gold medal – first place	1978 Belgrade	K-4 1000 m
Gold medal – first place	1979 Duisburg	K-4 500 m
Gold medal – first place	1979 Duisburg	K-4 1000 m

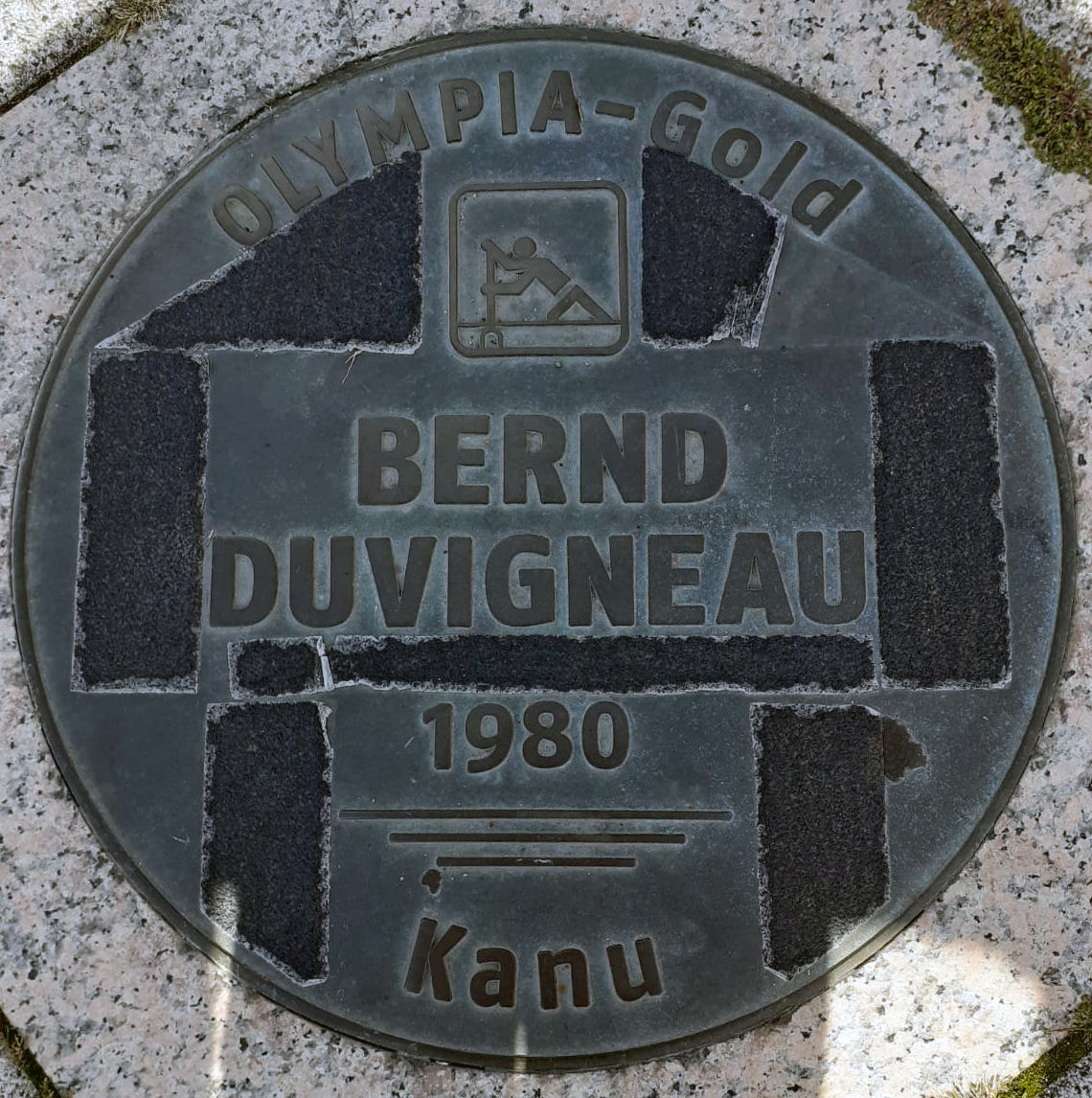
Memorial plaque, Bernd Duvigneau, Breiter Weg, Magdeburg, Deutschland

Bernd Duvigneau (born 3 December 1955 in Magdeburg) is an East German sprint canoeist who competed in the late 1970s and early 1980s. Competing in two Summer Olympics, he won two medals in the K-4 1000 m event with a gold in 1980 and a bronze in 1976.

Duvigneau also won five gold medals at the ICF Canoe Sprint World Championships, earning them in the K-4 500 m (1978, 1979) and the K-4 1000 m (1974, 1978, 1979) events.
