= Danio Merli =

Italian canoeist (born 1956)

Medal record

Men's canoe sprint

World Championships
Silver medal – second place	1975 Belgrade	K-2 10000 m

Danio Merli (born June 9, 1956) is an Italian sprint canoer who competed from the mid-1970s to the early 1980s. He won a silver medal in the K-2 10000 m event at the 1975 ICF Canoe Sprint World Championships in Belgrade.

Merli also competed in two Summer Olympics, earning his best finish of ninth in the K-2 1000 m event at Moscow in 1980. Now he is a gym teacher and one of three coaches of the Canoe Team of Canottieri Baldesio in Cremona, Lombardy.
