= István Joós =

Hungarian canoeist (born 1953)

Medal record

Men's canoe sprint

Olympic Games
Silver medal – second place	1980 Moscow	K-2 1000 m

World Championships
Silver medal – second place	1977 Sofia	K-4 10000 m
Silver medal – second place	1981 Nottingham	K-2 10000 m
Bronze medal – third place	1978 Belgrade	K-1 10000 m

István Joós (born March 27, 1953) is a Hungarian sprint canoeist who competed in the late 1970s and early 1980s. He won a silver medal in the K-2 1000 m event at the 1980 Summer Olympics in Moscow.

Joós also won three medals at the ICF Canoe Sprint World Championships with two silvers (K-2 10000 m: 1981, K-4 10000 m: 1977) and a bronze (K-1 10000 m: 1978).
