= Zoltán Sztanity =

Hungarian sprint canoer (born 1954)

Medal record

Men's canoe sprint

Olympic Games
| Silver medal – second place | 1976 Montreal | K-1 500 m |

World Championships
| Gold medal – first place | 1975 Belgrade | K-1 4 x 500 m |
| Bronze medal – third place | 1977 Sofia | K-1 500 m |

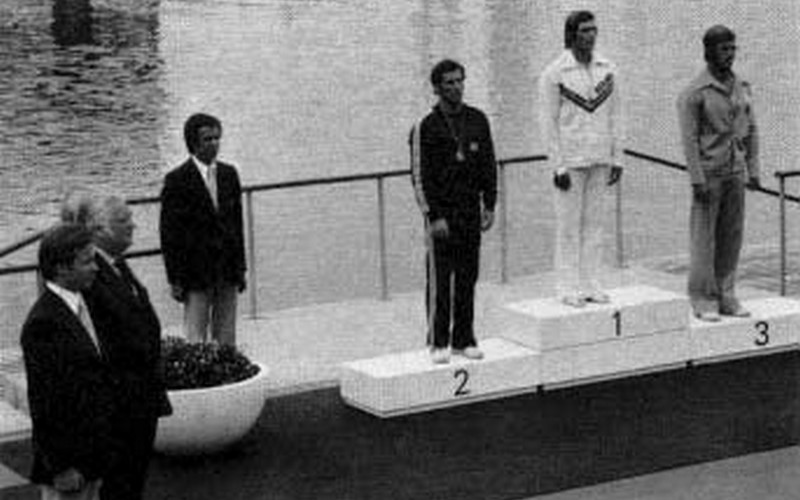
Medal ceremony, 1976 Montreal Olympics

Zoltán Sztanity (born 1 February 1954) is a Hungarian sprint canoeist who competed from the mid-1970s to the early 1980s. Competing in two Summer Olympics, he won a silver medal in the K-1 500 m event at Montreal in 1976.

Sztanity also won two medals at the ICF Canoe Sprint World Championships with a gold (K-1 4 x 500 m: 1975) and a bronze (K-1 500 m: 1977).
