= Unto Elo =

Finnish sprint canoer (born 1944)

Unto Elo (born November 29, 1944, in Helsinki) is a Finnish sprint canoer who competed in the mid-1970s. He was eliminated in the repechages of the K-4 1000 m event at the 1976 Summer Olympics in Montreal.
