= Makhneva, Perm Krai =

Makhneva Махнева
- Village
- Location within Perm Krai Location within Russia
- Coordinates: 59°27′N 57°40′E
- Country: Russia
- Region: Perm Krai
- District: Alexandrovsky District
- Time zone: UTC+5:00

Makhneva (Russian: Махнева) is a rural locality (a village) in Skopkortnenskoye Rural Settlement, Alexandrovsky District, Perm Krai, Russia. The population was 1 as of 2010.

== Geography ==
Makhneva is located 57 km north of Alexandrovsk (the district's administrative centre) by road. Skopkortnaya is the nearest rural locality.
