= Gennady Makhnev =

Soviet sprint canoer

Gennady Makhnev (born July 21, 1951) is a Soviet sprint canoer who competed in the early 1980s. At the 1980 Summer Olympics in Moscow, he finished seventh in the K-4 1000 m event.

Makhnev's son, Vadim, has competed for Belarus in three Summer Olympics, winning four medals with a gold (K-4 1000 m: 2008), a silver (K-2 200m: 2012), and two bronzes (K-2 500 m: 2004, 2008).
