= Borislav Borisov (canoeist) =

Bulgarian sprint canoer

Personal information
- Native name: Борислав Борисов
- Nationality: Bulgaria
- Born: 12 November 1954 (age 71)

Sport
- Sport: Canoe sprint
- Event: K-4 1000 m
- Retired: Early 1980s
Medal record
Representing Bulgaria
Olympic Games
Bronze medal – third place	1980 Moscow	K-4 1000 m

Borislav Borisov (Bulgarian: Борислав Борисов) (born November 12, 1954) is a Bulgarian sprint canoer who competed from the late 1970s to the early 1980s. Competing in two Summer Olympics, he won a bronze medal in the K-4 1000 m event at Moscow in 1980.
