= Crosbie Baulch =

Australian sprint canoeist (born 1959)

Crosbie Baulch (born 3 July 1959) is an Australian sprint canoeist who competed in the early 1980s. At the 1980 Summer Olympics in Moscow, he finished eighth in the K-4 1000 m event.
