= Harald Marg =

East German canoe racer (born 1954)

Medal record

Men's canoe sprint

Olympic Games
Gold medal – first place	1980 Moscow	K-4 1000 m

World Championships
Gold medal – first place	1978 Belgrade	K-4 500 m
Gold medal – first place	1978 Belgrade	K-4 1000 m
Gold medal – first place	1979 Duisburg	K-4 500 m
Gold medal – first place	1979 Duisburg	K-4 1000 m
Gold medal – first place	1981 Nottingham	K-4 1000 m
Gold medal – first place	1983 Tampere	K-4 500 m
Silver medal – second place	1975 Belgrade	K-2 500 m
Silver medal – second place	1975 Belgrade	K-4 1000 m
Silver medal – second place	1982 Belgrade	K-4 500 m
Silver medal – second place	1982 Belgrade	K-4 1000 m
Silver medal – second place	1983 Tampere	K-4 1000 m
Bronze medal – third place	1973 Tampere	K-4 1000 m
Bronze medal – third place	1981 Nottingham	K-4 500 m

Harald Marg (born 26 September 1954) is an East German sprint canoeist, born in Magdeburg, who competed from the mid-1970s to the mid-1980s. At the 1980 Summer Olympics in Moscow, he won the gold medal in the K-4 1000 m event.

Marg also won thirteen medals at the ICF Canoe Sprint World Championships with six golds (K-4 500 m: 1978, 1979, 1983; K-4 1000 m: 1978, 1979, 1981), five silvers (K-2 500 m: 1975, K-4 500 m: 1982, K-4 1000 m: 1975, 1982, 1983), and two bronzes (K-4 500 m: 1981, K-4 1000 m: 1973).
