= Esbela da Fonseca =

Portuguese gymnast (born 1942)

Personal information
- Nationality: Portuguese
- Born: 26 July 1942 (age 82); Lisbon, Portugal

Sport
- Sport: Gymnastics

Esbela da Fonseca (born 26 July 1942) is a Portuguese gymnast. She competed at the 1960 Summer Olympics, the 1964 Summer Olympics and the 1968 Summer Olympics.
