= Brian Haynes (canoeist) =

British canoeist (1951–2011)

Brian Haynes (16 August 1951 – 19 November 2011) was a British canoe sprinter who competed in the mid-1970s. He was eliminated in the semifinals of the K-4 1000 m event at the 1976 Summer Olympics in Montreal. He broke the British record over 1000m in the semi-final but it has now been beaten many times because of advances in equipment and training technology. He never officially retired from the sport and still carried it on right up until his diagnosis.

== Career ==
Haynes competed in the 1976 Summer Olympics. He was first overall in the Round the Island Sailing Race. He won twice the Multihull sailing class at the Cowes week regatta.

Hayne was appointed the vice president of sales of the Europe, Middle East and Africa region of Splunk in 2008.
