= Alexandru Giura =

Romanian canoeist

Medal record

Men's canoe sprint

World Championships
Silver medal – second place	1978 Belgrade	K-4 1000 m

Alexandru Giura (born 11 February 1957) is a Romanian sprint canoer who competed in the late 1970s and the early 1980s. He won a silver medal in the K-4 1000 m event at the 1978 ICF Canoe Sprint World Championships in Belgrade.

At the 1980 Summer Olympics in Moscow, Giura finished fourth in the K-2 1000 m and sixth in the K-2 500 m events.
