= Robert Lee (canoeist) =

Australian canoeist

Robert Lee (born 28 February 1956) is an Australian sprint canoeist who competed in the early 1980s. At the 1980 Summer Olympics in Moscow, he finished fifth in the K-2,500m event and eighth in the K-4 1,000m event.
