= Ion Geantă =

Romanian canoeist (1959–2019)

Medal record

Men's canoe sprint

Representing Romania

Olympic Games
Silver medal – second place	1980 Moscow	K-4 1000 m

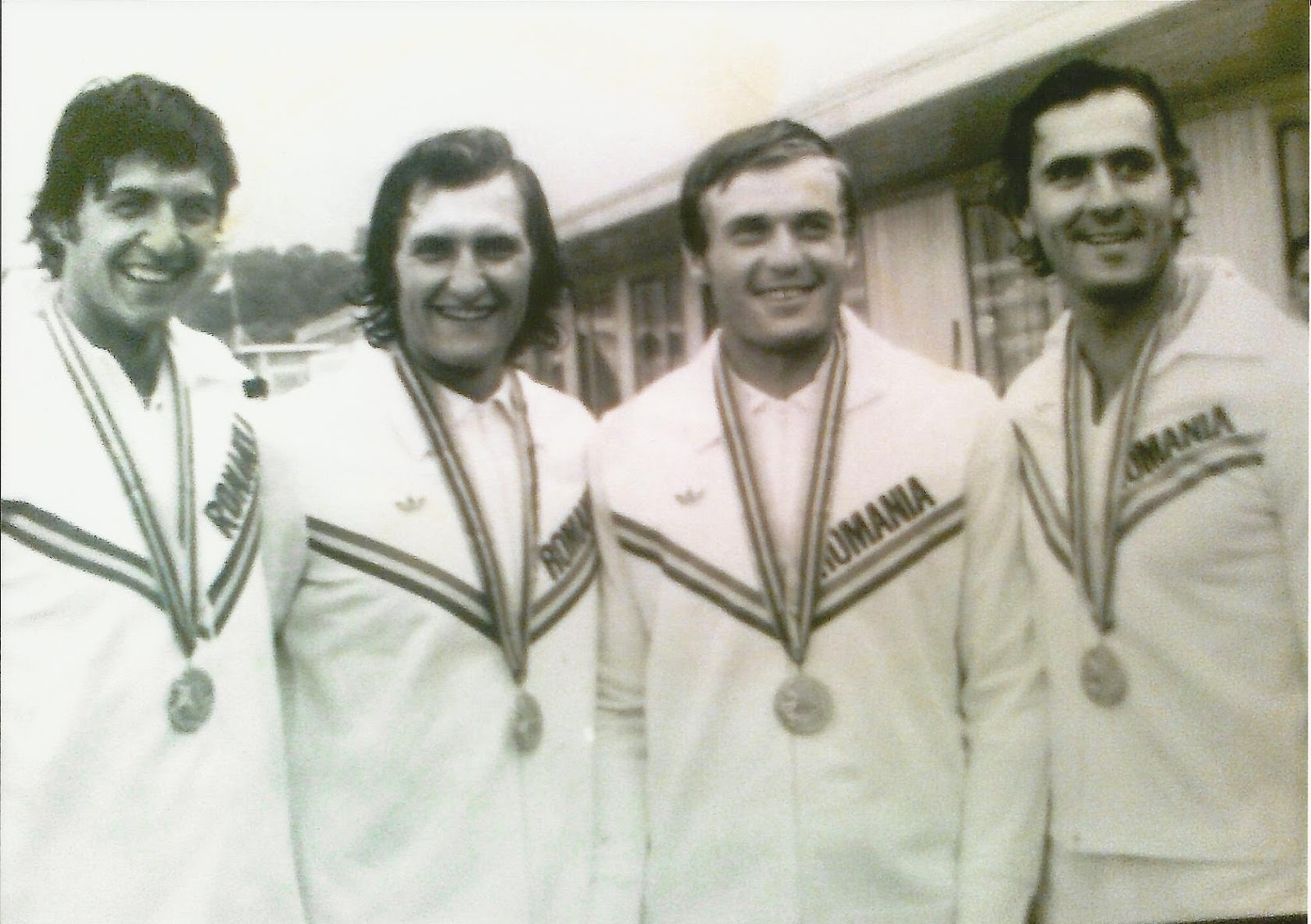
Romanian men's K-4 1000 metres team, 1980 Olympics

Ion Geantă (12 September 1959 – 2 July 2019) was a Romanian sprint canoer who competed from the late 1970s to the mid-1980s. Competing in two Summer Olympics, he won a silver medal in the K-4 1000 m event at Moscow in 1980.
