= Luis Ramos (canoeist) =

Spanish canoeist

Medal record

Men's canoe sprint

Olympic Games
Silver medal – second place	1976 Montreal	K-4 1000 m
Bronze medal – third place	1980 Moscow	K-2 1000 m

World Championships
Gold medal – first place	1975 Belgrade	K-4 1000 m
Silver medal – second place	1978 Belgrade	K-4 500 m
Bronze medal – third place	1975 Belgrade	K-1 4 x 500 m
Bronze medal – third place	1977 Sofia	K-4 500 m
Bronze medal – third place	1977 Sofia	K-4 1000 m
Bronze medal – third place	1978 Belgrade	K-4 1000 m
Bronze medal – third place	1979 Duisburg	K-2 10000 m
Bronze medal – third place	1982 Belgrade	K-2 1000 m

Luis Gregorio Ramos Misioné (born 15 May 1953) is a Spanish sprint canoeist who competed from the mid-1970s to the mid-1980s. Competing in three Summer Olympics, he won two medals with one silvers (1976: K-4 1000 m) and one bronze (1980: K-2 1000 m).

Ramos also won eight medals at the ICF Canoe Sprint World Championships with a gold (K-4 1000 m: 1975), a silver (K-4 500 m: 1978), and six bronzes (K-1 4 x 500 m: 1975. K-2 1000 m: 1982, K-2 10000 m: 1979, K-4 500 m: 1977, K-4 1000 m: 1977, 1978).
