= Barry Kelly (canoeist) =

Australian sprint canoeist and coach (born 1954)

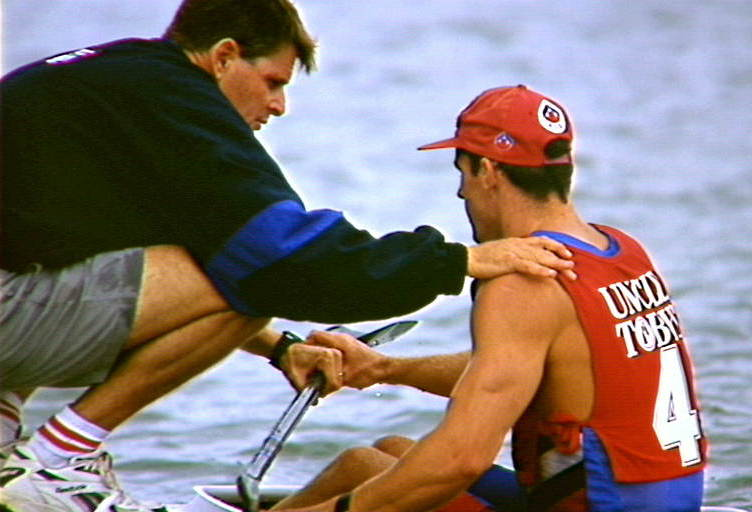

Medal record

Men's canoe sprint
Bronze medal – third place	1984 Los Angeles	K-2 1000 m

Barry Kelly (born 24 September 1954 in Bryon Bay, New South Wales) is an Australian sprint canoeist and coach.

Kelly played several sports in his youth including golf and rugby league. Kelly combined surf life saving and sprint canoe racing careers. Kelly won the single ski in 1977, 1978 and 1982 and the double ski in 1977 and 1988 at the Australian Surf Life Saving Championships.

Kelly competed at the 1980 Moscow Olympics in two events. He finished fifth with Robert Lee in the Men's K-2 500m and eighth in the Men's K-4 1000m. At the 1984 Los Angeles Olympics, with Grant Kenny he won a bronze medal in the K-2 1000m. He competed at the 1978, 1979, 1982 and 1983 ICF Canoe Sprint World Championships consistently placing in the top ten.

In 1989, Kelly was appointed Head Coach of the Australian Institute of Sport Sprint Canoe program that was relocated to the Gold Coast, Queensland. Kelly left this position after the 2000 Sydney Olympics. Kelly was a coach of the Australian sprint canoe team at the 1992 Barcelona Olympics and 1996 Atlanta Olympics and Head coach at the 2000 Sydney Olympics.

In 2000, he was awarded the Australian Sports Medal.
