= Vasile Dîba =

Romanian canoeist (1954–2024)

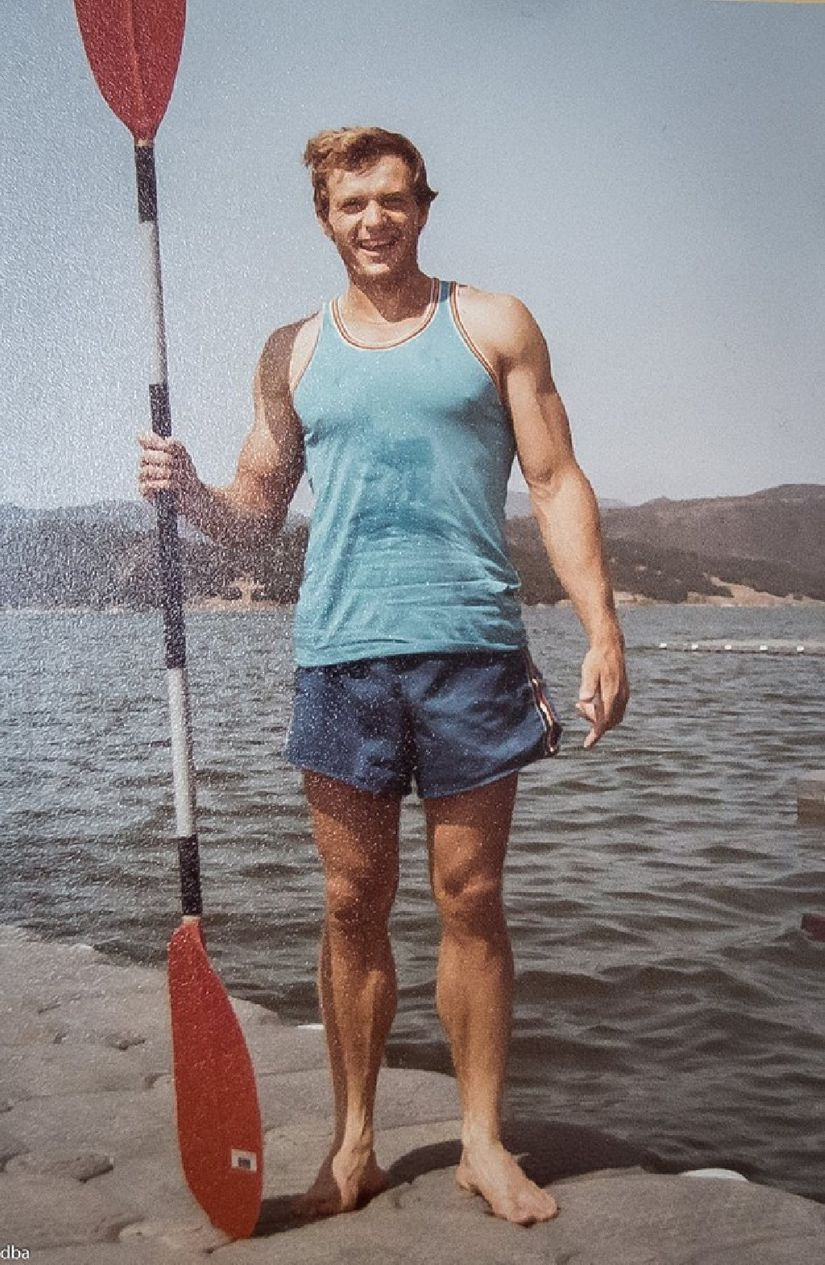
- Dîba in the 1970s

Personal information
- Born: 24 July 1954 Jurilovca, Romania
- Died: 20 February 2024 (aged 69) Bucharest, Romania
- Height: 182 cm (6 ft 0 in)
- Weight: 86 kg (190 lb)

Sport
- Sport: Canoe sprint
- Club: Tulcea; CS Dinamo București
- Coached by: Igor Lipalit
Medal record
Representing Romania
Olympic Games
Gold medal – first place	1976 Montreal	K-1 500 m
Bronze medal – third place	1976 Montreal	K-1 1000 m
Silver medal – second place	1980 Moscow	K-4 1000 m
Bronze medal – third place	1980 Moscow	K-1 500 m
World Championships
Gold medal – first place	1974 Mexico City	K-1 500 m
Gold medal – first place	1974 Mexico City	K-1 4×500 m
Silver medal – second place	1975 Belgrade	K-1 500 m
Silver medal – second place	1975 Belgrade	K-1 4×500 m
Gold medal – first place	1977 Sofia	K-1 500 m
Gold medal – first place	1977 Sofia	K-1 1000 m
Gold medal – first place	1978 Belgrade	K-1 500 m

Vasile Dîba (24 July 1954 – 20 February 2024) was a Romanian sprint canoeist. Competing in three Summer Olympics in 1976–1984, he won four medals with one gold (1976: K-1 500 m), one silver (1980: K-4 1000 m), and two bronzes (1976: K-1 1000 m, 1980: K-1 500 m). Dîba also won seven medals at the ICF Canoe Sprint World Championships with five golds (K-1 500 m: 1974, 1977, 1978; K-1 1000 m: 1977, K-1 4×500 m: 1974) and two silvers (K-1 500 m and K-1 4×500 m: both 1975). He later had a sports hall named after him in Jurilovca. Dîba died in Bucharest on 20 February 2024, at the age of 69.
