= Anders Larsson (canoeist) =

Swedish canoeist (born 1951)

Anders Håkan Larsson (born 6 February 1951 in Jönköping) is a Swedish sprint canoeist who competed in the mid-1970s. He was eliminated in the semifinals of the K-4 1000 m event at the 1976 Summer Olympics in Montreal.
