= Andrzej Klimaszewski (canoeist) =

Polish canoeist

Medal record

Men's canoe sprint

Representing Poland

World Championships
Silver medal – second place	1978 Belgrade	K-4 10000 m
Silver medal – second place	1979 Duisburg	K-4 10000 m
Silver medal – second place	1981 Nottingham	K-4 10000 m
Bronze medal – third place	1977 Sofia	K-4 10000 m
Bronze medal – third place	1983 Tampere	K-4 10000 m

Andrzej Aleksander Klimaszewski (born 26 November 1954) is a Polish sprint canoer who competed from the late 1970s to the mid-1980s. He won five medals in the K-4 10000 m at the ICF Canoe Sprint World Championships with three silvers (1978, 1979, 1981) and two bronzes (1977, 1983).

Klimaszewski competed in the K-2 1000 m event at the 1980 Summer Olympics in Moscow, but was eliminated in the repechagés.
