= Alan Williams (canoeist) =

British sprint canoer (born 1954)

Medal record

Men's canoe sprint

Representing United Kingdom

World Championships
Gold medal – first place	1983 Tampere	K-2 10000 m
Bronze medal – third place	1981 Nottingham	K-4 10000 m

Alan John Williams (born 21 April 1954) is a British canoe sprinter who competed from the late 1970s to the mid-1980s. He won two medals at the ICF Canoe Sprint World Championships with a gold (K-2 10000 m: 1983) and a bronze (K-4 10000 m: 1981). Williams was also a part of the army, based in Maidstone.

Williams also competed in two Summer Olympics, but did not advance to the final in either of the games he competed. His best finish was a fifth in the semifinal round of the K-4 1000 m event at Montreal in 1976.
