= John Trail =

Australian sprint canoeist (born 1943)

John Trail (born 2 October 1943) is an Australian sprint canoeist who competed in the mid-1970s. He was eliminated in the semifinals of the K-4 1000 m event at the 1976 Summer Olympics in Montreal.
