= Andrea Salvietti =

Italian canoeist (born 1952)

Andrea Salvietti (born 25 March 1952) is an Italian sprint canoeist who competed in the mid-1970s. He was eliminated in the repechages of the K-4 1000 m event at the 1976 Summer Olympics in Montreal.
