= Eero Hynninen =

Finnish canoeist (born 1953)

Eero Gunnar Antero Hynninen (born April 19, 1953 in Pieksämäki) is a Finnish sprint canoer who competed in the mid-1970s. He was eliminated in the repechages of the K-4 1000 m event at the 1976 Summer Olympics in Montreal.
