= Rüdiger Helm =

German cano sprinter (born 1956)

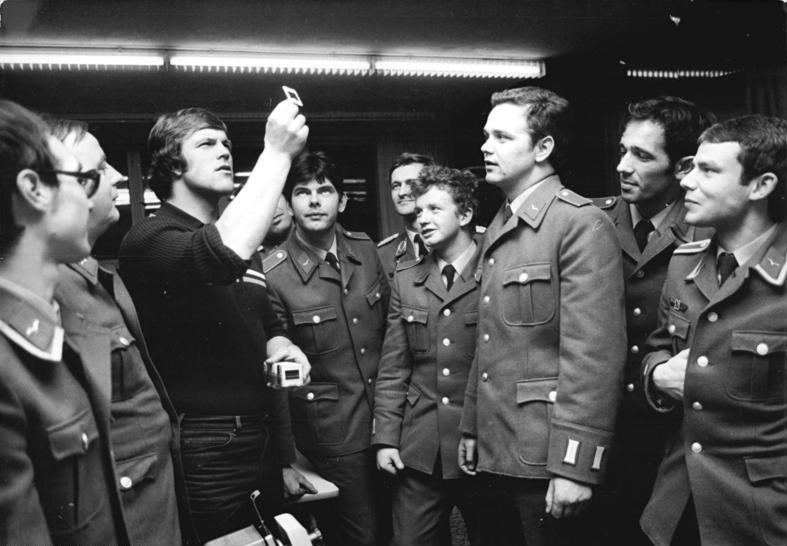
- Rüdiger Helm (in civilian clothing) in 1980

Personal information
- Born: 6 October 1956 (age 69) Neubrandenburg, East Germany
- Height: 188 cm (6 ft 2 in)
- Weight: 87 kg (192 lb)
Medal record
Men's canoe sprint
Olympic Games
Gold medal – first place	1976 Montreal	K-1 1000 m
Gold medal – first place	1980 Moscow	K-1 1000 m
Gold medal – first place	1980 Moscow	K-4 1000 m
Bronze medal – third place	1976 Montreal	K-1 500 m
Bronze medal – third place	1976 Montreal	K-4 1000 m
Bronze medal – third place	1980 Moscow	K-2 500 m
World Championships
Gold medal – first place	1978 Belgrade	K-1 1000 m
Gold medal – first place	1978 Belgrade	K-2 500 m
Gold medal – first place	1978 Belgrade	K-4 1000 m
Gold medal – first place	1979 Duisburg	K-1 1000 m
Gold medal – first place	1979 Duisburg	K-4 1000 m
Gold medal – first place	1981 Nottingham	K-1 1000 m
Gold medal – first place	1981 Nottingham	K-4 1000 m
Gold medal – first place	1982 Belgrade	K-1 1000 m
Gold medal – first place	1983 Tampere	K-1 1000 m
Gold medal – first place	1983 Tampere	K-4 500 m
Silver medal – second place	1975 Belgrade	K-4 1000 m
Silver medal – second place	1977 Sofia	K-1 1000 m
Silver medal – second place	1979 Duisburg	K-2 500 m
Silver medal – second place	1982 Belgrade	K-4 500 m
Silver medal – second place	1982 Belgrade	K-4 1000 m
Silver medal – second place	1983 Tampere	K-4 1000 m
Bronze medal – third place	1974 Mexico City	K-2 1000 m
Bronze medal – third place	1975 Belgrade	K-1 1000 m
Bronze medal – third place	1981 Nottingham	K-4 500 m

Rüdiger Helm (German pronunciation: [ˈʁyːdigɐ hɛlm], audio; born in Neubrandenburg on 6 October 1956) was an East German sprint canoeist who competed from the mid-1970s to the mid-1980s. Competing in two Summer Olympics, he won six medals which included three golds (1976: K-1 1000 m, 1980: K-1 1000 m, K-4 1000 m) and three bronzes (1976: K-1 500 m, K-4 1000 m; 1980: K-2 500 m).

Helm also won 19 medals at the ICF Canoe Sprint World Championships with ten golds (K-1 1000 m: 1978, 1979, 1981, 1982, 1983; K-2 500 m: 1978, K-4 500 m: 1983, K-4 1000 m: 1978, 1979, 1981), six silvers (K-1 1000 m: 1977, K-2 500 m: 1979, K-4 500 m: 1982, K-4 1000 m: 1975, 1982, 1983), and three bronzes (K-1 1000 m: 1975, K-2 1000 m: 1974, K-4 500 m: 1981).
