= Geoff Walker (canoeist) =

- Born: Geoffrey Seddon Walker; 21 July 1952; Christchurch, New Zealand
- Died: 18 October 1997 (aged 45); Christchurch, New Zealand
- Known for: Olympic canoeist

Geoffrey Seddon Walker (21 July 1952 – 18 October 1997) was a New Zealand canoeist who competed at the 1980 Summer Olympics. He partnered Alan Thompson in the K2 500 metres and K-2 1000 metres events, reaching the semi-finals of the former and finishing eighth in the final of the latter.

He first represented New Zealand in swimming, but narrowly missed selection for the 1970 Commonwealth Games in Edinburgh. Then he became one of New Zealand's top surf lifesavers, and the New Zealand surf ski champion six times between 1974 and 1988.

He branched into kayaking, was selected for the team for the 1980 Moscow Olympics.

He was in the New Zealand surf lifesaving team in 1980, 1982 and 1988. He won the New Zealand ironman championship four times, and in 1988 won three golds at the national championships in surf ski, surf ski rescue and double surf ski.

He was born in Christchurch, and died in Christchurch, aged 45, after a long illness.
