= Brian Newth =

New Zealand modern pentathlete

Personal information
- Born: January 13, 1947 (age 79) Wellington, New Zealand

Sport
- Sport: Modern pentathlon

Brian Allen Newth (born 13 January 1947) was a New Zealand modern pentathlete. Newth was one of the eight members (four athletes and four officials) of the New Zealand contingent who participated at the Games of the XXII Olympiad (Moscow) in 1980.

Newth carried the flag of the New Zealand Olympic and Commonwealth Games Association at the Opening Ceremony of the Games.

In the modern pentathlon competition, Newth scored the following:

- 23rd in the Equestrian (1018 points)
- 42nd in the Fencing (532 points)
- 38th in the Shooting (846 points)
- 39th in the Swimming (1048 points)
- 28th in the Cross-country running (1042 points)

Newth totalled 4486 points, placing him 40th overall.

== Notes ==
- THE GAMES - The pride and drama of New Zealanders at Olympic and Commonwealth Games by Ron Palenski and Terry Maddaford.
