= Gert Jan Lebbink =

Dutch sprint canoer (born 1961)

Medal record

Men's canoe sprint

Representing Netherlands

World Championships
Silver medal – second place	1982 Belgrade	K-2 10000 m

Gert Jan Lebbink (born 21 November 1961 in Deventer) is a Dutch sprint canoeist who competed in the early to mid-1980s. He won a silver in the K-2 10000 m event at the 1982 ICF Canoe Sprint World Championships in Belgrade.

Lebbnik also competed in two Summer Olympics, earning his best finish of seventh in the K-2 1000 m event at Moscow in 1980.
