= Ron Stevens (canoeist) =

Dutch sprint canoer (born 1959)

Medal record

Men's canoe sprint

Representing Netherlands

World Championships
Silver medal – second place	1982 Belgrade	K-2 10000 m

Ronaldus Cornelis "Ron" Stevens (born 15 February 1959 in Lienden, Gelderland) is a Dutch sprint canoeist who competed in the early to mid-1980s. He won a silver in the K-2 10000 m event at the 1982 ICF Canoe Sprint World Championships in Belgrade.

Stevens also competed in two Summer Olympics, earning his best finish of seventh in the K-2 1000 m event at Moscow in 1980.
