= Nicușor Eșanu =

Romanian canoeist

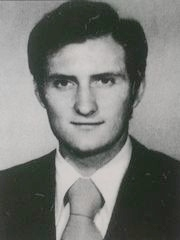

Personal information
- Born: 12 December 1954 (age 71) Bucharest, Romania
- Height: 185 cm (6 ft 1 in)
- Weight: 84 kg (185 lb)

Sport
- Sport: Canoe sprint
- Club: CSA Steaua București
Medal record
Representing Romania
Olympic Games
Silver medal – second place	1980 Moscow	K-4 1000 m
World Championships
Silver medal – second place	1975 Belgrade	K-4 10000 m
Silver medal – second place	1978 Belgrade	K-2 500 m
Silver medal – second place	1978 Belgrade	K-4 1000 m
Bronze medal – third place	1978 Belgrade	K-2 10000 m
Gold medal – first place	1979 Duisburg	K-2 10000 m
Bronze medal – third place	1981 Nottingham	K-2 10000 m

Nicuşor Eşanu (born 12 December 1954) is a retired Romanian canoe sprinter. He competed in the K-4 1000 m event at the 1976 and 1980 Olympics and placed fourth and second, respectively. At the world championships he won six medals with a gold (K-2 10000 m: 1979), three silvers (K-2 500 m: 1978, K-4 1000 m: 1978, K-4 10000 m: 1975), and two bronzes (K-2 10000 m: 1978, 1981).

Eşanu spent his entire career at CSA Steaua București, and after retiring from competitions worked as a coach there.
