= Kjell Hasselqvist =

Swedish canoeist (born 1949)

Kjell Arne Hasselqvist (born July 1, 1949, in Eskilstuna) is a Swedish sprint canoer who competed in the mid-1970s. He was eliminated in the semifinals of the K-4 1000 m event at the 1976 Summer Olympics in Montreal.
