= Pfaffing =

- Municipality
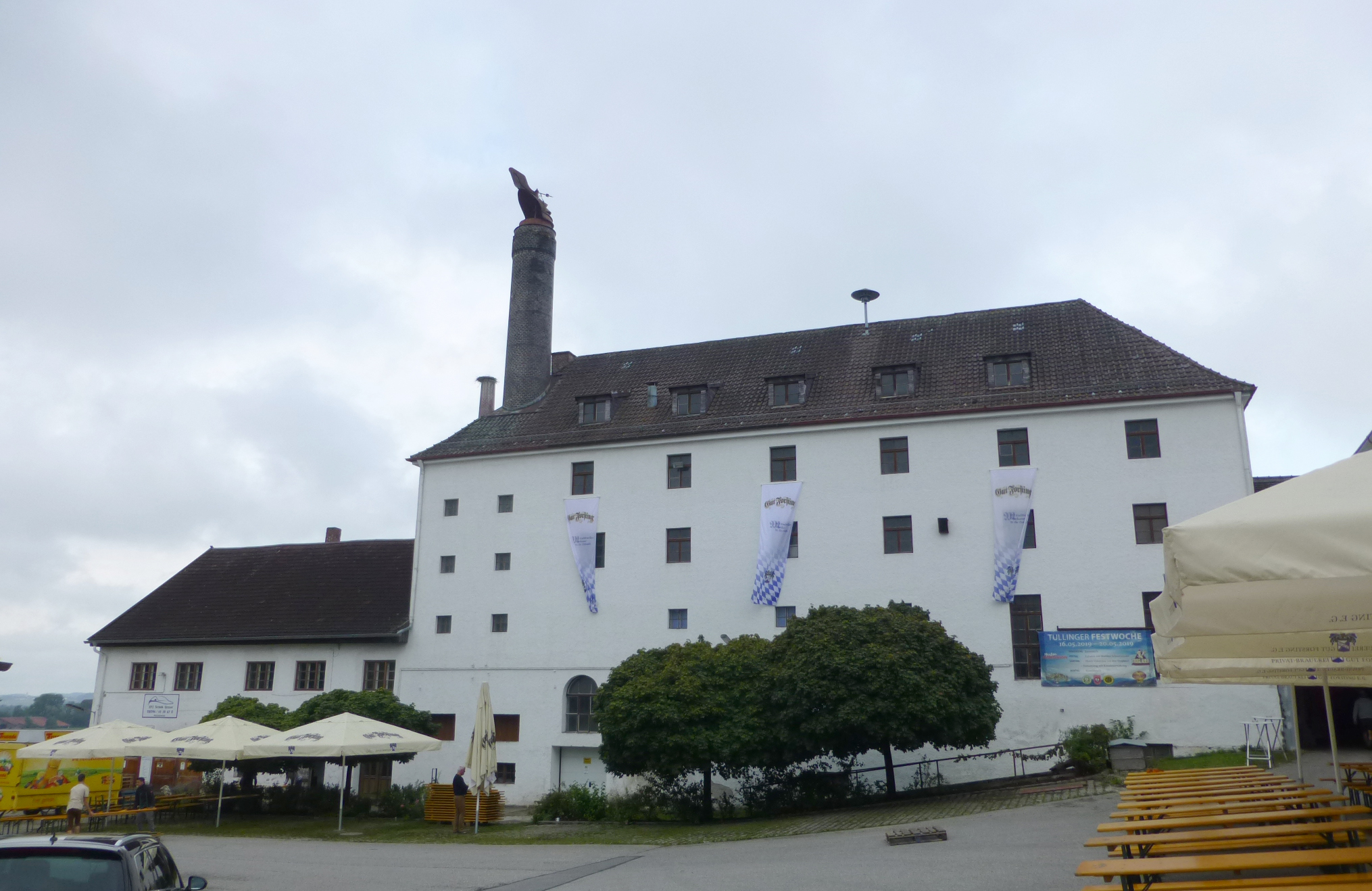
- Forsting Brewery

- Coat of arms

- Location of Pfaffing within Rosenheim district
- Interactive map of Pfaffing
- Location within Germany Location within Bavaria
- Coordinates: 48°03′15″N 12°06′33″E
- Country: Germany
- State: Bavaria
- Admin. region: Oberbayern
- District: Rosenheim
- Municipal assoc.: Pfaffing

Government
  - Mayor (2020–26): Josef Niedermeier (FW)

Area
  - Total: 35.39 km^{2} (13.66 sq mi)
- Elevation: 492 m (1,614 ft)

Population (2025-12-31)
  - Total: 4,008
  - Density: 113.3/km^{2} (293.3/sq mi)
- Time zone: UTC+01:00 (CET)
  - Summer (DST): UTC+02:00 (CEST)
- Postal codes: 83539
- Dialling codes: 08076
- Vehicle registration: RO
- Website: www.pfaffing.de

Pfaffing (German pronunciation: [ˈpfafɪŋ]) is a municipality in the district of Rosenheim in Bavaria in Germany. The main town of the same name is the seat of the municipal administration.
