= Lazar Khristov =

Bulgarian canoeist

Olympic medal record

Men's canoe sprint
Bronze medal – third place	1980 Moscow	K-4 1000 m

Lazar Khristov (Bulgarian: Лазар Христов) (born 17 February 1954) is a Bulgarian sprint canoer who competed from the late 1970s to the early 1980s. Competing in two Summer Olympics, he won a bronze medal in the K-4 1000 m event at Moscow in 1980.
