= Ivan Manev =

Bulgarian canoeist (born 1950)

Olympic medal record

Men's canoe sprint
Bronze medal – third place	1980 Moscow	K-4 1000 m

Ivan Manev (Bulgarian: Иван Манев) (born 23 November 1950) is a Bulgarian sprint canoer who competed from the late 1970s to the early 1980s. Competing in two Summer Olympics, he won a bronze medal in the K-4 1000 m event at Moscow in 1980.
