= Francis Hervieu =

French canoeist

Medal record

Men's canoe sprint

World Championships
Bronze medal – third place	1979 Duisburg	K-2 500 m

Francis Hervieu, born on 13 June 1956, is a French kayaker.

== Palmares ==
Hervieu Francis participated at the Moscow Olympics in 1980, where he finished fourth and at the Olympic Games in Los Angeles in 1984 (6th). He has even been shortlisted for the Olympics in Montreal (1976) and Seoul (1988). He participated in the World Championships (finals) : 7th in 1978, 3rd in 1979, 8th in 1982, 8th in 1983, 5th in 1985, 7th in 1986 and was a semifinalist in 1977 and 1981. Francis Hervieu also holds more than 15 France champion titles in K-1 (single-seater), K-2 (two-seater) and K-4 (four seats) between 1975 and 1987.

== Profession ==
He was bank employee before his military service. He is currently professor of sport the Departmental Direction of Social Cohesion since 1989.
