= Herminio Menéndez =

Spanish canoeist (born 1953)

Medal record

Men's canoe sprint

Representing Spain

Olympic Games
Silver medal – second place	1976 Montreal	K-4 1000 m
Silver medal – second place	1980 Moscow	K-2 500 m
Bronze medal – third place	1980 Moscow	K-2 1000 m

World Championships
Gold medal – first place	1975 Belgrade	K-4 1000 m
Silver medal – second place	1978 Belgrade	K-4 500 m
Bronze medal – third place	1975 Belgrade	K-1 4 x 500 m
Bronze medal – third place	1977 Sofia	K-4 500 m
Bronze medal – third place	1977 Sofia	K-4 1000 m
Bronze medal – third place	1978 Belgrade	K-4 1000 m
Bronze medal – third place	1979 Duisburg	K-2 10000 m
Bronze medal – third place	1982 Belgrade	K-2 1000 m

Herminio Menéndez Rodríguez (Note: In this Spanish name, the first or paternal surname is Menéndez and the second or maternal family name is Rodríguez.) (born 20 December 1953) is a Spanish sprint canoer who competed from the early 1970s to the mid-1980s. Competing in four Summer Olympics, he won three medals with two silvers (1976: K-4 1000 m, 1980: K-2 500 m) and one bronze (1980: K-2 1000 m).

Menéndez also won eight medals at the ICF Canoe Sprint World Championships with a gold (K-4 1000 m: 1975), a silver (K-4 500 m: 1978), and six bronzes (K-1 4 x 500 m: 1975. K-2 1000 m: 1982, K-2 10000 m: 1979, K-4 500 m: 1977, K-4 1000 m: 1977, 1978).
