= Spain at the 1984 Summer Olympics =

- IOC code: ESP
- NOC: Spanish Olympic Committee

in Los Angeles
- Competitors: 179 (163 men and 16 women) in 23 sports
- Flag bearer: Alejandro Abascal
- Medals Ranked 20th: Gold 1 Silver 2 Bronze 2 Total 5

Summer Olympics appearances (overview)
- 1900; 1904–1912; 1920; 1924; 1928; 1932; 1936; 1948; 1952; 1956; 1960; 1964; 1968; 1972; 1976; 1980; 1984; 1988; 1992; 1996; 2000; 2004; 2008; 2012; 2016; 2020; 2024; 2028

Spain competed at the 1984 Summer Olympics in Los Angeles, United States. 179 competitors, 163 men and 16 women, took part in 104 events in 23 sports.

== Medalists ==
Medal	Name	Sport	Event	Date
Gold	Luis Doreste; Roberto Molina	Sailing	470	July 31
Silver	Luis María Lasúrtegui; Fernando Climent	Rowing	Men's coxless pair	August 5
Silver	Spain men's national basketball team: Fernando Romay; Juan Antonio San Epifanio; Ignacio Solozábal; Juan Manuel López Iturriaga; José Margall; Fernando Martín Espina; Juan de la Cruz; Andrés Jiménez; José Llorente; Fernando Arcega; José Manuel Beirán; Juan Corbalán	Basketball	Men's tournament	August 10
Bronze	Narcisco Suárez; Enrique Miguez	Canoeing	Men's C-2 500 m	August 10
Bronze	José Manuel Abascal	Athletics	Men's 1500 m	August 11

Medals by sport
Sport	1st place, gold medalist(s)	2nd place, silver medalist(s)	3rd place, bronze medalist(s)	Total
Sailing	1	0	0	1
Basketball	0	1	0	1
Rowing	0	1	0	1
Athletics	0	0	1	1
Canoeing	0	0	1	1
Total	1	2	2	5

== Archery ==
In its third Olympic archery competition, Spain was represented by two men and two women.
Women's Individual Competition:

- Montserrat Martín – 2418 points (→ 28th place)
- Ascension Guerra – 2304 points (→ 38th place)

Men's Individual Competition:

- Manuel Rubio – 2390 points (→ 37th place)
- José Prieto – 2341 points (→ 47th place)

== Athletics ==
Men's 400 metres

- Angel Heras

- Heat — 46.06
- Quarterfinals — 45.88 (→ did not advance)

- Antonio Sánchez

- Heat — 46.04
- Quarterfinals — 45.79 (→ did not advance)

Men's 1,500 metres

- José Manuel Abascal

- Qualifying Heat — 3:37.68
- Semi-Finals — 3:35.70
- Final — 3:34.30 (→ Bronze Medal)

- Andrés Vera

- Qualifying Heat — 3:45.44
- Semi-Finals — 3:36.55
- Final — 3:37.02 (→ 7th place)

- José Luis González

- Qualifying Heat — 3:47.01 (→ did not advance)

Men's 5,000 metres

- Jorge García

- Heat — 14:12.15 (→ did not advance)

Men's 10,000 metres

- Antonio Prieto

- Qualifying Heat — 28:57.78 (→ did not advance)

Men's Marathon

- Juan Carlos Traspaderne

- Final — did not finish (→ no ranking)

- Santiago de la Parte

- Final — did not finish (→ no ranking)

Men's Long Jump

- Antonio Corgos

- Qualification — 8.02m
- Final — 7.69m (→ 10th place)

Men's 20 km Walk

- Josep Marín

- Final — 1:25:32 (→ 6th place)

Men's 50 km Walk

- Jordi Llopart

- Final — 4:03:09 (→ 7th place)

- Manuel Alcalde

- Final — 4:05:47 (→ 9th place)

Men's Hammer Throw

- Raul Jimeno

- Qualification — 66.38m (→ did not advance)

Men's Pole Vault

- Alberto Ruiz

- Qualifying Round — 5.45m
- Final — 5.20m (→ 9th place)

- Alfonso Cano

- Qualifying Round — no mark (→ did not advance)

Women's 100 metres

- Teresa Rione

- First Heat — 11.55s
- Second Heat — 11.76s (→ did not advance)

Women's High Jump

- Isabel Mozún

- Qualification — 1.75m (→ did not advance, 26th place)

== Basketball ==
Men's Team Competition

- Preliminary round (Group B)

- Defeated Canada (83-82)
- Defeated Uruguay (107-90)
- Defeated France (97-82)
- Defeated PR China (102-83)
- Lost to United States (68-101)

- Quarterfinals

- Defeated Australia (101-93)

- Semifinals

- Defeated Yugoslavia (74-61)

- Final

- Lost to United States (65-96) → Silver Medal

- Team Roster

- Fernando Romay
- Juan San Epifanio
- Ignacio Solozábal
- José López
- José Margall
- Fernando Martín Espina
- Juan de la Cruz
- Andrés Jiménez
- José Llorente
- Fernando Arcega
- José Beirán
- Juan Corbalán

== Boxing ==
Men's Light Flyweight (– 48 kg)

- Agapito Gómez
  1. First Round — Defeated Mahjoub Mjirich (MAR), on points (3:2)
  2. Second Round — Lost to Marcelino Bolivar (VEN), on points (1:4)

Men's Flyweight (– 51 kg)

- Julio Gómez
  1. First Round — Lost to Alvaro Mercado (COL), on points (1:4)

Men's Featherweight (– 57 kg)

- Raul Trapero
  1. First Round — Bye
  2. Second Round — Lost to Türgüt Aykaç (TUR) 0:5

Men's Lightweight (– 60 kg)

- José Antonio Hernando
  1. First Round — Bye
  2. Second Round — Defeated Jean-Claude Labonte (SEY), 5:0
  3. Third Round — Defeated Douglas Odane (GHA), 5:0
  4. Quarterfinals — Lost to Luis Ortiz (PUR), 0:5

== Canoeing ==
Canoe Singles (C1), Men's 500 metres

- Francisco López (9th)

Canoe Singles (C1), Men's 1,000 metres

- Francisco López (9th)

Canoe Doubles (C2), Men's 500 metres

- Enrique Míguez, Narciso Suárez Bronze

Canoe Doubles (C2), Men's 1,000 metres

- Enrique Míguez, Narciso Suárez (6th)

Kayak Singles (K1), Men's 500 metres

- Guillermo del Riego (7th)

Kayak Singles (K1), Men's 1,000 metres

- Pedro Alegre (9th)

Kayak Doubles (K2), Men's 500 metres

- Herminio Menéndez, Guillermo del Riego (2nd semifinal)

Kayak Doubles (K2), Men's 1,000 metres

- Herminio Menéndez, Guillermo del Riego (7th)

Kayak Fours (K4), Men's 1,000 metres

- Iván González, Luis Ramos, Juan José Román, Juan Manuel Sánchez (6th)

== Cycling ==
Four cyclists represented Spain in 1984.

Individual road race

- Francisco Antequera — 23rd place
- Manuel Jorge Domínguez — did not finish (→ no ranking)
- Miguel Induráin — did not finish (→ no ranking)
- José Salvador Sanchis — did not finish (→ no ranking)

== Diving ==
Men's 3m Springboard

- Ricardo Camacho

- Preliminary round — 509.10 (→ did not advance, 17th place)

== Fencing ==
Two fencers, both men, represented Spain in 1984.

Men's épée

- Ángel Fernández

Men's sabre

- Antonio García

== Handball ==
Men's Team Competition

- Preliminary round (Group B)

- Lost to West Germany (16:18)
- Lost to Denmark (16:21)
- Lost to Sweden (25:26)
- Defeated United States (17:16)
- Defeated South Korea (31:25)

- Classification Match

- 7th/8th place: Lost to Switzerland (17:18) → 8th place

- Team Roster

- Cecilio Alonso
- Juan Javier Cabanas
- Juan de la Puente
- Juan Pedro de Miguel
- Pere García
- Rafael López
- Agustín Milián
- Juan Francisco Muñoz
- José Ignacio Novoa
- Jaime Puig
- Javier Reino
- Lorenzo Rico
- Julián Ruiz
- Eugenio Serrano
- Juan José Uría

== Hockey ==
Men's Team Competition

- Preliminary round (Group A)

- Spain – West Germany 1-3
- Spain – Australia 1-3
- Spain – India 3-4
- Spain – United States 3-1
- Spain – Malaysia 3-1

- Classification Matches

- 5th/8th place: Spain – Netherlands 0-0 (Netherlands win after penalty strokes, 10-4)
- 7th/8th place: Spain – New Zealand 0-1 (→ 8th place)

- Team Roster

- José Agut
- Javier Cabot
- Juan Arbós
- Andrés Gómez
- Juan Carlos Peón
- Jaime Arbós
- Ricardo Cabot
- Juan Malgosa
- Carlos Roca
- Mariano Bordas
- Ignacio Cobos
- Jordi Oliva
- Miguel de Paz
- Ignacio Escudé
- Santiago Malgosa
- José Miguel García

== Judo ==
Extra Lightweight, Men

- Carlos Sotillo (=7th)

Half Lightweight, Men

- Francisco Rodríguez (=20th)

Lightweight, Men

- Joaquín Ruiz (=13th)

Half Middleweight, Men

- Ignacio Sanz (=20th)

Middleweight, Men

- Alfonso García (=12th)

Half Heavyweight, Men

- Alberto Rubio (=9th)

== Modern pentathlon ==
Three male modern pentathletes represented Spain in 1984.

Individual

- Jorge Quesada
- Eduardo Burguete
- Federico Galera

Team

- Jorge Quesada
- Eduardo Burguete
- Federico Galera

== Rowing ==
There were eight competitions for men and Spain qualified four boats, but had no women competing in 1984. Although he had competed at the 1980 Summer Olympics, Manuel Vera Vázquez was still the youngest competitor of the Spanish rowing team. The coxless pair of Fernando Climent and Luis María Lasúrtegui was a surprise medallist, and as of 2016, the team's silver medal is the only Olympic rowing medal that the nation has ever won.

Athlete	Event	Heats		Repechage		Semifinals		Final	
Athlete	Event	Time	Rank	Time	Rank	Time	Rank	Time	Rank
José Ramón Oyarzábal	Single sculls	7:39.16	4 R	7:33.68	3 SA/B	7:32.72	4 FB	7:36.78	11
Fernando Climent; Luis María Lasúrtegui	Coxless pair	6:54.34	2 SA/B	Bye		6:53.58	2 FA	6:48.87	2nd place, silver medalist(s)
Isidro Martín; José Manuel Bermúdez; Joaquín Sabriá (cox)	Coxed pair	7:29.30	5 R	7:42.23	4 FB	—N/a		7:34.38	10
Luis Miguel Oliver; Jesús González; Manuel Vera Vázquez; Julio Oliver	Quadruple sculls	6:01.80	2 R	6:08.65	2 FA	—N/a		6:04.99	6

== Sailing ==
Men

Athlete	Event	Race							Net points	Final rank
Athlete	Event	1	2	3	4	5	6	7	Net points	Final rank
Eduardo Bellini	Windglider	3	15	~~YMP~~	24	13	11	8	92.0	12

Open

Athlete	Event	Race							Net points	Final rank
Athlete	Event	1	2	3	4	5	6	7	Net points	Final rank
Joaquín Blanco	Finn	~~DSQ~~	8	18	4	6	2	1	60.7	4
Luis Doreste; Roberto Molina	470	3	1	5	2	1	9	~~DNS~~	33.7	1st place, gold medalist(s)
Alejandro Abascal; Miguel Noguer	Flying Dutchman	6	9	14	11	~~16~~	9	7	91.7	11
Antonio Gorostegui; José Luis Doreste	Star	8	~~14~~	10	5	4	7	7	74.0	7

== Shooting ==
Men

Athlete	Event	Final	
Athlete	Event	Points	Rank
Luis del Cerro	50 m rifle prone	588	30
Ángel Corsino Fernández	50 m free pistol	543	27
Jorge González	50 m rifle three positions	1146	11
Jorge González	50 m rifle prone	588	30
Jorge González	10 m air rifle	572	30
Eduardo Jiménez	25 m rapid fire pistol	579	29
José María Pigrau	50 m rifle three positions	1128	30
José María Pigrau	10 m air rifle	574	26
Juan Segui	25 m rapid fire pistol	589	10

Women

Athlete	Event	Qualification		Final	
Athlete	Event	Points	Rank	Points	Rank
Eva Suarez	10 m air pistol	379	10	Did not advance	
Eva Suarez	25 m pistol	569	32	Did not advance	

Open

Athlete	Event	Qualification		Semifinal		Final	
Athlete	Event	Points	Rank	Points	Rank	Points	Rank
Rafael Axpe	Trap	145	13 Q	193	11	Did not advance	
José Bladas	Trap	144	18 Q	190	18	Did not advance	
Jorge Guardiola	Skeet	147	8 Q	196	6 Q	220	3rd place, bronze medalist(s)
Eladio Vallduvi	Trap	145	11 Q	192	12	Did not advance	
Gemma Usieto	Trap	140	33	Did not advance			

== Swimming ==
Men's 200m Freestyle

- Juan Carlos Vallejo

- Heat — 1:51.97
- B-Final — 1:51.77 (→ 10th place)

- Javier Miralpeix

- Heat — 1:55.25 (→ did not advance, 28th place)

Men's 400m Freestyle

- Juan Enrique Escalas

- Heat — 3:55.93
- B-Final — 3:55.25 (→ 10th place)

Men's 1500m Freestyle

- Rafael Escalas

- Heat — 15:30.09 (→ did not advance, 11th place)

- Juan Enrique Escalas

- Heat — 15:44.85 (→ did not advance, 18th place)

Men's 100m Backstroke

- Ricardo Aldabe

- Heat — 57.90
- B-Final — 58.31 (→ 13th place)

Men's 200m Backstroke

- Ricardo Aldabe

- Heat — 2:03.94
- Final — 2:04.53 (→ 7th place)

Men's 100m Breaststroke

- Enrique Romero

- Heat — 1:05.19 (→ did not advance, 18th place)

Men's 200m Breaststroke

- Enrique Romero

- Heat — 2:21.25
- B-Final — 2:21.19 (→ 13th place)

Men's 100m Butterfly

- David López-Zubero

- Heat — 55.66
- B-Final — 55.61 (→ 12th place)

- Harri Garmendia

- Heat — 55.97 (→ did not advance, 19th place)

Men's 200m Butterfly

- Harri Garmendia

- Heat — 2:02.37
- B-Final — 2:01.82 (→ 15th place)

Men's 200m Individual Medley

- Harri Garmendia

- Heat — 2:08.30 (→ did not advance, 19th place)

Men's 400m Individual Medley

- Rafael Escalas

- Heat — DNS (→ did not advance, no ranking)

Men's 4 × 200 m Freestyle Relay

- Juan Enrique Escalas, Rafael Escalas, Juan Carlos Vallejo, and David López-Zubero

- Heat — 7:32.21 (→ did not advance, 11th place)

== Water polo ==
Men's Team Competition

- Preliminary round (Group B)

- Defeated Brazil (19-12)
- Defeated Greece (12-9)
- Lost to United States (8-10)

- Final Round (Group D)

- Drew with West Germany (8-8)
- Defeated Netherlands (8-4)
- Lost to Yugoslavia (8-14)
- Drew with Australia (10-10) → 4th place

- Team Roster

- Leandro Ribera
- José Morillo
- Felix Férnandez
- Alberto Canal
- Manuel Estiarte
- Pedro Robert
- Rafael Aguilar
- Jorge Signes
- Antonio Aguilar
- Jorge Carmona
- Jorge Sans
- Jorge Neira
- Mariano Moya
