= Canoeing at the 1988 Summer Olympics – Men's C-1 1000 metres =

The men's C-1 1000 metres event was an open-style, individual canoeing event conducted as part of the Canoeing at the 1988 Summer Olympics program.

== Medallists ==
Gold	Silver	Bronze
Ivans Klementyev (URS)	Jörg Schmidt (GDR)	Nikolay Bukhalov (BUL)

== Results ==
=== Heats ===
Fifteen competitors were entered. Held on September 27, the top three finishers in each heat moved on to the semifinals with the others relegated to the repechages.

==== Heat 1 ====
Rank	Canoer	Country	Time	Notes
1.	Jörg Schmidt	East Germany	4:06.18	QS
2.	Eric Jamieson	Great Britain	4:06.88	QS
3.	Nikolay Bukhalov	Bulgaria	4:09.57	QS
4.	Peter Páleš	Czechoslovakia	4:11.88	QR
5.	Jan Pinczura	Poland	4:14.10	QR
6.	Bruce Merritt	United States	4:17.73	QR
7.	Timo Grönlund	Finland	4:24.69	QR

==== Heat 2 ====
Rank	Canoer	Country	Time	Notes
1.	Ivans Klementyev	Soviet Union	4:05.02	QS
2.	Larry Cain	Canada	4:09.50	QS
3.	Aurel Macarencu	Romania	4:09.71	QS
4.	Ivan Šabjan	Yugoslavia	4:11.54	QR
5.	Imre Pulai	Hungary	4:12.18	QR
6.	Francisco López	Spain	4:16.02	QR
7.	Hiroyuki Izumi	Japan	4:40.34	QR
8.	Jang Yeong-Cheol	South Korea	4:47.95	QR

=== Repechages ===
Held on September 27, the top three finishers in each repechage moved on to the semifinals.

==== Repechage 1 ====
Rank	Canoer	Country	Time	Notes
1.	Peter Páleš	Czechoslovakia	4:17.83	QS
2.	Imre Pulai	Hungary	4:20.50	QS
3.	Bruce Merritt	United States	4:41.75	QS
4.	Hiroyuki Izumi	Japan	5:00.98	

==== Repechage 2 ====
Rank	Canoer	Country	Time	Notes
1.	Ivan Šabjan	Yugoslavia	4:20.82	QS
2.	Francisco López	Spain	4:22.34	QS
3.	Jan Pinczura	Poland	4:24.10	QS
4.	Timo Grönlund	Finland	4:26.80	
5.	Jang Yeong-Cheol	South Korea	4:43.95	

=== Semifinals ===
Taking place on September 29, the top three finishers in each semifinal advanced to the final.

==== Semifinal 1 ====
Rank	Canoer	Country	Time	Notes
1.	Aurel Macarencu	Romania	4:07.69	QF
2.	Jörg Schmidt	East Germany	4:08.17	QF
3.	Ivan Šabjan	Yugoslavia	4:08.75	QF
4.	Bruce Merritt	United States	4:16.51	

==== Semifinal 2 ====
Rank	Canoer	Country	Time	Notes
1.	Ivans Klementyev	Soviet Union	4:05.06	QF
2.	Nikolay Bukhalov	Bulgaria	4:07.23	QF
3.	Imre Pulai	Hungary	4:10.79	QF
4.	Francisco López	Spain	4:16.90	

==== Semifinal 3 ====
Rank	Canoer	Country	Time	Notes
1.	Larry Cain	Canada	4:07.47	QF
2.	Peter Páleš	Czechoslovakia	4:08.84	QF
3.	Eric Jamieson	Great Britain	4:13.44	QF
-	Jan Pinczura	Poland	DISQ	

Pinczura's disqualification was not disclosed in the official report.

=== Final ===
The final took place on October 1.

Rank	Canoer	Country	Time	Notes
1st place, gold medalist(s)	Ivans Klementyev	Soviet Union	4:12.78	
2nd place, silver medalist(s)	Jörg Schmidt	East Germany	4:15.83	
3rd place, bronze medalist(s)	Nikolay Bukhalov	Bulgaria	4:18.94	
4.	Larry Cain	Canada	4:20.70	
5.	Aurel Macarencu	Romania	4:21.72	
6.	Imre Pulai	Hungary	4:21.86	
7.	Peter Páleš	Czechoslovakia	4:22.14	
8.	Ivan Šabjan	Yugoslavia	4:24.67	
9.	Eric Jamieson	Great Britain	4:39.60	
