= Canoeing at the 1988 Summer Olympics – Men's C-1 500 metres =

The men's C-1 500 metres event was an open-style, individual canoeing event conducted as part of the Canoeing at the 1988 Summer Olympics program.

== Medallists ==
Gold	Silver	Bronze
Olaf Heukrodt (GDR)	Michał Śliwiński (URS)	Martin Marinov (BUL)

== Results ==
=== Heats ===
18 competitors were entered, but three withdrew prior to the heats. Held on September 26, the top three finishers in each heat moved on to the semifinals with the others were relegated to the repechages. Heat 2 was scheduled, but not held with all three competitors advancing to the semifinals due to an insufficient number of entrants.

Heat 1
1.	Michał Śliwiński (URS)	1:51.90	QS
2.	Martin Marinov (BUL)	1:52.74	QS
3.	Olaf Heukrodt (GDR)	1:53.73	QS
4.	Petr Procházka (TCH)	1:58.09	QR
5.	Jan Pinczura (POL)	2:00.20	QR
6.	Jang Yeong-Cheol (KOR)	2:13.21	QR
Heat 2
-	Narcisco Suárez (ESP)	-	QS
-	Larry Cain (CAN)	-	QS
-	Jim Terrell (USA)	-	QS
Heat 3
1.	Attila Szabó (HUN)	1:54.83	QS
2.	Aurel Macarencu (ROU)	1:54.95	QS
3.	Eric Jamieson (GBR)	1:55.66	QS
4.	Ivan Šabjan (YUG)	2:00.55	QR
5.	Timo Grönlund (FIN)	2:01.60	QR
6.	Yasunobu Kanada (JPN)	2:10.20	QR

=== Repechages ===
Two repechages were held on September 26 with the top three finishers in each repechage advancing to the semifinals. The second repechage was scheduled, but not held with both competitors advancing to the semifinals.

Repechage 1
1.	Petr Procházka (TCH)	2:00.64	QS
2.	Timo Grönlund (FIN)	2:01.48	QS
3.	Jang Yeong-Cheol (KOR)	2:05.85	QS
4.	Yasunobu Kanada (JPN)	2:06.31
Repechage 2
-	Ivan Šabjan (YUG)	-	QS
-	Jan Pinczura (POL)	-	QS

=== Semifinals ===
Three semifinals were held on September 28 with the top three finishers of each semifinal advancing to the final.

Semifinal 1
1.	Michał Śliwiński (URS)	1:52.86	QF
2.	Eric Jamieson (GBR)	1:54.30	QF
3.	Petr Procházka (TCH)	1:55.62	QF
4.	Larry Cain (CAN)	1:56.24
Semifinal 2
1.	Olaf Heukrodt (GDR)	1:55.50	QF
2.	Jan Pinczura (POL)	1:57.61	QF
3.	Aurel Macarencu (ROU)	1:57.81	QF
4.	Jim Terrell (USA)	2:00.13
5.	Jang Yeong-Cheol (KOR)	2:05.04
Semifinal 3
1.	Martin Marinov (BUL)	1:55.61	QF
2.	Attila Szabó (HUN)	1:55.72	QF
3.	Narcisco Suárez (ESP)	1:55.98	QF
4.	Ivan Šabjan (YUG)	1:55.99
5.	Timo Grönlund (FIN)	2:04.82

=== Final ===
The final took place on September 30.

Gold	Olaf Heukrodt (GDR)	1:56.42
Silver	Michał Śliwiński (URS)	1:57.26
Bronze	Martin Marinov (BUL)	1:57.27
4.	Attila Szabó (HUN)	1:59.87
5.	Jan Pinczura (POL)	1:59.97
6.	Aurel Macarencu (ROU)	2:00.98
7.	Narcisco Suárez (ESP)	2:01.33
8.	Petr Procházka (TCH)	2:01.36
9.	Eric Jamieson (GBR)	2:02.27

Heukrodt was last at the halfway mark.
