= Canoeing at the 1980 Summer Olympics – Men's C-2 1000 metres =

The men's C-2 1000 metres event was an open-style, pairs canoeing event conducted as part of the Canoeing at the 1980 Summer Olympics program.

== Medalists ==
Gold	Silver	Bronze
Ivan Patzaichin and Toma Simionov (ROU)	Olaf Heukrodt and Uwe Madeja (GDR)	Vasyl Yurchenko and Yuri Lobanov (URS)

== Results ==
=== Heats ===
Twelve teams entered in two heats on July 31, but one withdrew. The top three finishers from each of the heats advanced directly to the final and the remaining five teams were relegated to the semifinal.

Heat 1
1.	Jiří Vrdlovec and Petr Kubíček (TCH)	3:42.01	QF
2.	Berndt Lindelöf and Eirk Zeidlitz (SWE)	3:44.91	QF
3.	Raycho Karmadzhiev and Kaman Kutsev (BUL)	3:45.56	QF
4.	Narcisco Suárez and Santos Magaz (ESP)	3:45.81	QS
5.	Jarmo Hakala and Jyrki Hakala (FIN)	3:47.37	QS
-	Franck Lambert and Pierre Langlois (FRA)	Did not start
Heat 2
1.	Ivan Patzaichin and Toma Simionov (ROU)	3:38.36	QF
2.	Vasyl Yurchenko and Yuri Lobanov (URS)	3:41.32	QF
3.	Tamás Buday and Oszkár Frey (HUN)	3:45.03	QF
4.	Olaf Heukrodt and Uwe Madeja (GDR)	3:47.43	QS
5.	Matija Ljubek and Mirko Nišović (YUG)	3:47.85	QS
6.	Marek Dopierała and Jan Pinczura (POL)	3:58.77	QS

=== Semifinal ===
A semifinal was held on August 2. The top three finishers from the semifinal advanced to the final.

Semifinal
1.	Olaf Heukrodt and Uwe Madeja (GDR)	3:54.99	QF
2.	Matija Ljubek and Mirko Nišović (YUG)	3:55.52	QF
3.	Marek Dopierała and Jan Pinczura (POL)	3:55.99	QF
4.	Jarmo Hakala and Jyrki Hakala (FIN)	4:03.89
5.	Narcisco Suárez and Santos Magaz (ESP)	4:09.14

=== Final ===
The final was held on August 2.

Gold	Ivan Patzaichin and Toma Simionov (ROU)	3:47.65
Silver	Olaf Heukrodt and Uwe Madeja (GDR)	3:49.93
Bronze	Vasyl Yurchenko and Yuri Lobanov (URS)	3:51.28
4.	Matija Ljubek and Mirko Nišović (YUG)	3:51.30
5.	Jiří Vrdlovec and Petr Kubíček (TCH)	3:52.50
6.	Marek Dopierała and Jan Pinczura (POL)	3:53.01
7.	Raycho Karmadzhiev and Kaman Kutsev (BUL)	3:53.89
8.	Tamás Buday and Oszkár Frey (HUN)	3:54.31
9.	Berndt Lindelöf and Eirk Zeidlitz (SWE)	3:58.62
