= Canoeing at the 1984 Summer Olympics – Men's C-2 1000 metres =

The men's C-2 1000 metres event was an open-style, pairs canoeing event conducted as part of the Canoeing at the 1984 Summer Olympics program.

== Medalists ==
Gold	Silver	Bronze
Ivan Patzaichin and Toma Simionov (ROU)	Matija Ljubek and Mirko Nišović (YUG)	Didier Hoyer and Eric Renaud (FRA)

== Results ==
=== Heats ===
Ten teams entered in two heats on August 7. The top three finishers from each of the heats advanced directly to the final and the remaining four teams were relegated to the semifinal.

Heat 1
1.	Ivan Patzaichin and Toma Simionov (ROU)	3:47.60	QF
2.	Andrew Train and Stephen Train (GBR)	3:59.70	QF
3.	Wolfram Faust and Ralf Wienand (FRG)	4:01.73	QF
4.	Arturo Ferrer and Víctor Velasco (MEX)	4:03.75	QS
5.	Shusei Fukuzato and Hiroyuki Izumi (JPN)	4:05.26	QS
Heat 2
1.	Matija Ljubek and Mirko Nišović (YUG)	3:50.78	QF
2.	Didier Hoyer and Eric Renaud (FRA)	3:52.71	QF
3.	John Plankenhorn and Rodney McLain (USA)	3:55.38	QF
4.	Steve Botting and Eric Smith (CAN)	3:56.60	QS
5.	Enrique Míguez and Narcisco Suárez (ESP)	3:56.70	QS

=== Semifinal ===
A semifinal was held on August 9. The top three finishers from the semifinal advanced to the final.

Semifinal
1.	Enrique Míguez and Narcisco Suárez (ESP)	3:53.83	QF
2.	Steve Botting and Eric Smith (CAN)	3:54.49	QF
3.	Arturo Ferrer and Víctor Velasco (MEX)	3:58.70	QF
4.	Shusei Fukuzato and Hiroyuki Izumi (JPN)	4:10.77

=== Final ===
The final was held on August 11.

Gold	Ivan Patzaichin and Toma Simionov (ROU)	3:40.60
Silver	Matija Ljubek and Mirko Nišović (YUG)	3:41.56
Bronze	Didier Hoyer and Eric Renaud (FRA)	3:48.01
4.	Wolfram Faust and Ralf Wienand (FRG)	3:52.69
5.	John Plankenhorn and Rodney McLain (USA)	3:52.72
6.	Enrique Míguez and Narcisco Suárez (ESP)	3:56.92
7.	Steve Botting and Eric Smith (CAN)	3:56.99
8.	Arturo Ferrer and Víctor Velasco (MEX)	3:56.99
9.	Andrew Train and Stephen Train (GBR)	3:58.62
