= Canoeing at the 1984 Summer Olympics – Men's C-2 500 metres =

The men's C-2 500 metres event was an open-style, pairs canoeing event conducted as part of the Canoeing at the 1984 Summer Olympics program.

== Medalists ==
| Gold | Silver | Bronze |
| Matija Ljubek and Mirko Nišović (YUG) | Ivan Patzaichin and Toma Simionov (ROU) | Enrique Míguez and Narciso Suárez (ESP) |

== Results ==
=== Heats ===
Eleven teams entered in two heats on August 6. The top three finishers from each of the heats advanced directly to the final and the remaining five teams were relegated to the semifinal.

Heat 1
| 1. | Matija Ljubek and Mirko Nišović (YUG) | 1:49.08 | QF |
| 2. | Didier Hoyer and Eric Renaud (FRA) | 1:50.04 | QF |
| 3. | Enrique Míguez and Narciso Suárez (ESP) | 1:50.74 | QF |
| 4. | Wolfram Faust and Ralf Wienand (FRG) | 1:51.08 | QS |
| 5. | Bret Young and Bruce Merritt (USA) | 1:53.50 | QS |
Heat 2
| 1. | Ivan Patzaichin and Toma Simionov (ROU) | 1:47.18 | QF |
| 2. | Steve Botting and Eric Smith (CAN) | 1:51.37 | QF |
| 3. | Eric Jamieson and Andrew Train (GBR) | 1:52.22 | QF |
| 4. | Shusei Fukuzato and Hiroyuki Izumi (JPN) | 1:52.41 | QS |
| 5. | Arturo Ferrer and Víctor Velasco (MEX) | 1:57.80 | QS |
| 6. | Jang Yeong-Cheol and Yun Hui-Chun (KOR) | 2:25.20 | QS |

=== Semifinal ===
A semifinal was held on August 8. The top three finishers from the semifinal advanced to the final.

Semifinal
| 1. | Wolfram Faust and Ralf Wienand (FRG) | 1:50.20 | QF |
| 2. | Shusei Fukuzato and Hiroyuki Izumi (JPN) | 1:51.37 | QF |
| 3. | Bret Young and Bruce Merritt (USA) | 1:51.49 | QF |
| 4. | Arturo Ferrer and Víctor Velasco (MEX) | 1:53.19 |
| 5. | Jang Yeong-Cheol and Yun Hui-Chun (KOR) | 2:20.23 |

=== Final ===
The final was held on August 10.

| Gold | Matija Ljubek and Mirko Nišović (YUG) | 1:43.67 |
| Silver | Ivan Patzaichin and Toma Simionov (ROU) | 1:45.58 |
| Bronze | Enrique Míguez and Narciso Suárez (ESP) | 1:47.71 |
| 4. | Didier Hoyer and Eric Renaud (FRA) | 1:47.72 |
| 5. | Steve Botting and Eric Smith (CAN) | 1:48.81 |
| 6. | Wolfram Faust and Ralf Wienand (FRG) | 1:48.97 |
| 7. | Eric Jamieson and Andrew Train (GBR) | 1:49.59 |
| 8. | Shusei Fukuzato and Hiroyuki Izumi (JPN) | 1:50.22 |
| 9. | Bret Young and Bruce Merritt (USA) | 1:50.55 |

The Yugoslavs won the gold thanks to a closing spurt that pushed them past the Romanians after 400 m.
