= Canoeing at the 1976 Summer Olympics – Men's C-1 1000 metres =

The men's C-1 1000 metres event was an open-style, individual canoeing event conducted as part of the Canoeing at the 1976 Summer Olympics program.

== Medallists ==
Gold	Silver	Bronze
Matija Ljubek (YUG)	Vasyl Yurchenko (URS)	Tamás Wichmann (HUN)

== Results ==
=== Heats ===
Fifteen competitors were entered. Held on July 29, the top three finishers in each heat moved on to the semifinals with the others relegated to the repechages.

==== Heat 1 ====
Rank	Canoer	Country	Time	Notes
1.	Ivan Patzaichin	Romania	4:13.09	QS
2.	Tamás Wichmann	Hungary	4:14.87	QS
3.	Matija Ljubek	Yugoslavia	4:15.14	QS
4.	Roland Iche	France	4:20.13	QR
5.	Ulrich Eicke	West Germany	4:28.66	QR
6.	Pietro Bruschi	Italy	4:33.38	QR
7.	William Reichenstein	Great Britain	4:49.20	QR
8.	Mitsuo Nakanishi	Japan	4:52.59	QR

==== Heat 2 ====
Rank	Canoer	Country	Time	Notes
1.	Vasyl Yurchenko	Soviet Union	4:20.44	QS
2.	Wilfried Stephan	East Germany	4:25.23	QS
3.	Borislav Ananiev	Bulgaria	4:28.18	QS
4.	Göran Backlund	Sweden	4:29.36	QR
5.	Timo Grönlund	Finland	4:30.93	QR
6.	John Edwards	Canada	4:32.67	QR
7.	Angus Morrison	United States	4:35.77	QR

=== Repechages ===
Held on July 29, the top three finisher in each repechage advanced to the semifinals.

==== Repechage 1 ====
Rank	Canoer	Country	Time	Notes
1.	Roland Iche	France	4:15.51	QS
2.	Angus Morrison	United States	4:18.11	QS
3.	Pietro Bruschi	Italy	4:19.11	QS
4.	Timo Grönlund	Finland	4:19.71	
5.	Mitsuo Nakanishi	Japan	4:40.96	

==== Repechage2 ====
Rank	Canoer	Country	Time	Notes
1.	Ulrich Eicke	West Germany	4:12.00	QS
2.	John Edwards	Canada	4:14.47	QS
3.	Göran Backlund	Sweden	4:28.18	QS
4.	William Reichenstein	Great Britain	4:37.47	

=== Semifinals ===
Taking place on July 31, the top three finishers in each semifinal advanced to the final.

==== Semifinal 1 ====
Rank	Canoer	Country	Time	Notes
1.	Borislav Ananiev	Bulgaria	4:13.39	QF
2.	Ivan Patzaichin	Romania	4:15.21	QF
3.	Ulrich Eicke	West Germany	4:16.69	QF
4.	Pietro Bruschi	Italy	4:21.88	

==== Semifinal 2 ====
Rank	Canoer	Country	Time	Notes
1.	Vasyl Yurchenko	Soviet Union	4:12.00	QF
2.	Matija Ljubek	Yugoslavia	4:19.99	QF
3.	John Edwards	Canada	4:21.89	QF
4.	Angus Morrison	United States	4:25.83	

==== Semifinal 3 ====
Rank	Canoer	Country	Time	Notes
1.	Tamás Wichmann	Hungary	4:17.32	QF
2.	Roland Iche	France	4:18.30	QF
3.	Wilfried Stephan	East Germany	4:18.99	QF
4.	Göran Backlund	Sweden	4:20.93	

=== Final ===
The final took place on July 31.

Rank	Canoer	Country	Time	Notes
1st place, gold medalist(s)	Matija Ljubek	Yugoslavia	4:09.51	
2nd place, silver medalist(s)	Vasyl Yurchenko	Soviet Union	4:12.57	
3rd place, bronze medalist(s)	Tamás Wichmann	Hungary	4:14.11	
4.	Borislav Ananiev	Bulgaria	4:14.41	
5.	Ivan Patzaichin	Romania	4:15.08	
6.	Roland Iche	France	4:18.23	
7.	Wilfried Stephan	East Germany	4:22.43	
8.	Ulrich Eicke	West Germany	4:22.77	
9.	John Edwards	Canada	4:30.55	

Ljubek, fourth at the halfway mark, was the only finalist to paddle the second half of the race faster than the first.
