= Hakala =

Hakala is a Finnish surname. Notable people with the surname include:

- Aki Hakala (born 1979), Finnish drummer
- Aleksi Hakala (1886–1959), Finnish politician
- Antti Hakala (born 1978), Finnish musician known by his stage name Nopsajalka
- Jarmo Hakala (born 1954), Finnish canoeist
- Jukka Hakala (born 1977), Finnish footballer
- Jyrki Hakala (born 1960), Finnish canoeist
- Kalle Hakala (1880–1947), Finnish politician
- Marita Hakala, Finnish model
- Tommi Hakala (born 1970), Finnish opera singer
- Tuomo Hakala (born 1957), Finnish footballer
- Vesa Hakala (born 1968), Finnish ski jumper
- Yrjö Hakala (1932–2023), Finnish ice hockey player

== See also ==
- Nihad Fetić Hakala, Bosnian singer
