= Canoeing at the 1980 Summer Olympics – Men's C-2 500 metres =

The men's C-2 500 metres event was an open-style, pairs canoeing event conducted as part of the Canoeing at the 1980 Summer Olympics program.

== Medalists ==
Gold	Silver	Bronze
László Foltán and István Vaskúti (HUN)	Ivan Patzaichin and Petre Capusta (ROU)	Borislav Ananiev and Nikolai Ilkov (BUL)

== Results ==
=== Heats ===
Eleven teams entered in two heats on July 30 though one withdrew prior to the heats. The top three finishers from each of the heats advanced directly to the final and the remaining four teams were relegated to the semifinal.

Heat 1
1.	László Foltán and István Vaskúti (HUN)	1:41.96	QF
2.	Ivan Patzaichin and Petre Capusta (ROU)	1:42.24	QF
3.	Serhei Petrenko and Aleksandr Vinogradov (URS)	1:44.54	QF
4.	Borislav Ananiev and Nikolai Ilkov (BUL)	1:45.00	QS
5.	Jarmo Hakala and Jyrki Hakala (FIN)	1:49.81	QS
-	Mirko Nišović and Matija Ljubek (YUG)	Did not start
Heat 2
1.	Marek Wisła and Jerzy Dunajski (POL)	1:45.67	QF
2.	Jiří Vrdlovec and Petr Kubíček (TCH)	1:46.75	QF
3.	Berndt Lindelöf and Erik Zeidlitz (SWE)	1:46.97	QF
4.	Franck Lambert and Pierre Langlois (FRA)	1:48.94	QS
5.	Narcisco Suárez and Santos Magaz (ESP)	1:50.11	QS

=== Semifinal ===
A semifinal was held on August 1. The top three finishers from the semifinal advanced to the final.

Semifinal
1.	Borislav Ananiev and Nikolai Ilkov (BUL)	1:47.42	QF
2.	Narcisco Suárez and Santos Magaz (ESP)	1:47.98	QF
3.	Franck Lambert and Pierre Langlois (FRA)	1:49.23	QF
4.	Jarmo Hakala and Jyrki Hakala (FIN)	1:49.40

=== Final ===
The final was held on August 1.

Gold	László Foltán and István Vaskúti (HUN)	1:43.39
Silver	Ivan Patzaichin and Petre Capusta (ROU)	1:44.12
Bronze	Borislav Ananiev and Nikolai Ilkov (BUL)	1:44.83
4.	Marek Wisła and Jerzy Dunajski (POL)	1:45.10
5.	Jiří Vrdlovec and Petr Kubíček (TCH)	1:46.48
6.	Serhei Petrenko and Aleksandr Vinogradov (URS)	1:46.95
7.	Narcisco Suárez and Santos Magaz (ESP)	1:48.18
8.	Berndt Lindelöf and Erik Zeidlitz (SWE)	1:48.69
9.	Franck Lambert and Pierre Langlois (FRA)	1:50.33
