= Canoeing at the 1976 Summer Olympics – Men's C-1 500 metres =

The men's C-1 500 metres event was an open-style, individual canoeing event conducted as part of the Canoeing at the 1976 Summer Olympics program. This event debuted at these games.

== Medallists ==
Gold	Silver	Bronze
Aleksandr Rogov (URS)	John Wood (CAN)	Matija Ljubek (YUG)

== Results ==
=== Heats ===
Fifteen competitors were entered. Held on July 28, the top three finishers in each heat moved on to the semifinals with the others were relegated to the repechages.

Heat 1
1.	Wilfried Stephan (GDR)	2:09.32	QS
2.	Ulrich Eicke (FRG)	2:11.79	QS
3.	Timo Grönlund (FIN)	2:14.40	QS
4.	Atsunobu Ogata (JPN)	2:14.55	QR
5.	Pietro Bruschi (ITA)	2:16.44	QR
6.	Ryszard Kosiński (POL)	2:16.60	QR
7.	Angus Morrison (USA)	4:56.70	QR
Heat 2
1.	Matija Ljubek (YUG)	2:10.16	QS
2.	Károly Szegedi (HUN)	2:10.82	QS
3.	Borislav Ananiev (BUL)	2:12.16	QS
4.	John Wood (CAN)	2:12.60	QR
5.	Aleksandr Rogov (URS)	2:12.77	QR
6.	Göran Backlund (SWE)	2:14.82	QR
7.	Ivan Patzaichin (ROU)	2:15.35	QR
8.	Roland Iche (FRA)	2:20.85	QR

=== Repechages ===
Held on July 28, the top three finishers in each repechage moved on to the semifinals.

Repechage 1
1.	Ivan Patzaichin (ROU)	2:03.01	QS
2.	Aleksandr Rogov (URS)	2:04.70	QS
3.	Ryszard Kosiński (POL)	2:08.06	QS
4.	Atsunobu Ogata (JPN)	2:11.66
Repechage 2
1.	John Wood (CAN)	2:04.90	QS
2.	Roland Iche (FRA)	2:06.47	QS
3.	Göran Backlund (SWE)	2:07.81	QS
4.	Pietro Bruschi (ITA)	2:10.84
5.	Angus Morrison (USA)	2:12.92

=== Semifinals ===
Three semifinals were held on July 30 with the top three finishers in each semifinal advancing to the final.

Semifinal 1
1.	Wilfried Stephan (GDR)	2:07.00	QF
2.	John Wood (CAN)	2:09.91	QF
3.	Borislav Ananiev (BUL)	2:11.23	QF
4.	Ryszard Kosiński (POL)	2:12.71
Semifinal 2
1.	Aleksandr Rogov (URS)	2:06.83	QF
2.	Matija Ljubek (YUG)	2:07.99	QF
3.	Roland Iche (FRA)	2:10.18	QF
4.	Timo Grönlund (FIN)	2:17.39
Semifinal 3
1.	Károly Szegedi (HUN)	2:07.50	QF
2.	Ivan Patzaichin (ROU)	2:09.34	QF
3.	Ulrich Eicke (FRG)	2:11.05	QF
4.	Göran Backlund (SWE)	2:13.83

=== Final ===
The final took place on July 30.

	Aleksandr Rogov (URS)	1:59.29
	John Wood (CAN)	1:59.58
	Matija Ljubek (YUG)	1:59.60
4.	Borislav Ananiev (BUL)	1:59.92
5.	Wilfried Stephan (GDR)	2:00.54
6.	Károly Szegedi (HUN)	2:01.12
7.	Ivan Patzaichin (ROU)	2:01.40
8.	Ulrich Eicke (FRG)	2:02.30
9.	Roland Iche (FRA)	2:04.27

Wood jumped out to an early lead to the delight of the Canadian crowd of 5000 leading from start to the last few strokes when he was passed by the favorite Rogov.
