= Ilkov =

Ilkov is a surname. Notable people with the surname include:

- Nikolai Ilkov (born 1955), Bulgarian Olympic canoeist
- Sevdalin Ilkov, Bulgarian Olympic canoeist
