= Botting =

Botting may refer to:

== Surname ==
- Anna Botting (born 1967), British TV news anchor
- Cam Botting (born 1954), Canadian professional ice hockey forward
- Douglas Botting (1934–2018), English explorer, author, biographer and TV presenter and producer
- Francis Joseph Botting (1819–1906), auctioneer in Adelaide, South Australia
- Gary Botting (born 1943), Canadian lawyer, legal scholar, naturalist, playwright and poet
- Graham Botting (1915–2007), New Zealand cricketer
- James Botting (1783–1857), hangman at Newgate Prison in London
- Louise Botting (born 1939), journalist, radio presenter and company director
- Nicola Botting, British language and communication scientist
- Ralph Botting (born 1955), former Major League Baseball pitcher
- Stephen Botting (1845–1927), English cricketer
- Steve Botting (born 1959), Canadian sprint canoeist

== Other ==
- Internet bot, software application that runs automated tasks over the internet
- Video game bot, an automated player in a video game
