= Yasunobu =

- Gender: Male

Origin
- Origin: Japanese
- Meaning: Different meanings depending on the kanji used

Yasunobu is a masculine Japanese given name.

== Kanji and meaning ==
The name Yasunobu is composed of two elements yasu and nobu, each of which could be written with a variety of kanji, for example:

- yasu: 泰 ("great" or "exalted"), 裕 ("abundant"), 康 ("health"), 安 ("peaceful" or "safe")
- nobu: 伸 ("extend"), 暢 ("smoothly"), 信 ("trust")

The same elements can also be written in the opposite order to form the masculine name Nobuyasu.

== People ==
Notable people with the name Yasunobu include:

- Yasunobu Matsuoka (松岡 康暢; born 1986), Japanese footballer
- Yasunobu Sekikawa (堰川 康信; born 1980), Japanese weightlifter
- Yasunobu Chiba (千葉 泰伸; born 1971), Japanese footballer
- Yasunobu Nakamura (中村 泰信; born 1968), Japanese quantum physicist
- Yasunobu Kanada (金田 裕伸; born 1963), Japanese sprint canoeist
- Kanō Yasunobu (狩野 安信; 1614–1685), Japanese painter
- Miyake Yasunobu (三宅 康信; 1563–1632), Japanese daimyō
