= John Wood (canoeist) =

Canadian canoeist (1950–2013)

John Joseph Wood (June 7, 1950 – January 23, 2013) was a Canadian sprint canoeist who competed from the late 1960s to the later 1970s. Competing in three Summer Olympics, he won the silver medal in the C-1 500 m event at Montreal in 1976. The medal was Canada's first in the sport since 1952.

== Athletics career ==
At the 1976 Montreal Olympics, where he won the silver and gold medal in the C-1 500 m and C-2 1000m for Canada, he finished second to Aleksandr Rogov. Rogov had gotten gunk from the officiating boats onto his hands prior to race start, and Wood passed a scrubbing towel to Rogov to help him clean it off, allowing his competitor to win the race over him.

Four years earlier in Munich, Wood and compatriot Scott Lee were eliminated in the semifinals of the C-2 1000 m event.

Wood also won a silver medal in the C-2 500 m event at the 1977 ICF Canoe Sprint World Championships in Sofia, and won a bronze medal in sailing at the 1979 Pan American Games in San Juan.

Wood was featured prominently in the 1978 documentary Paddles Up! on YouTube (originally produced by Wolf Ruck Productions for Canoe Ontario), which promotes the sport of sprint canoe-kayak in Canada. In the film, Wood is shown training in his C-1, running, and in the weight room. Wood provides an accompanying voice-over that discusses the appeal of sport and canoeing in particular: "What I enjoy most about paddling in a race is winning. But that's not necessarily what I enjoy most about paddling. I get real satisfaction out of training: just spinning along out of doors."

== Post-athletics ==
After retiring from active competition, Wood became a successful businessman in Toronto, founding the investment company 20/20 Financial. In addition to his business pursuits, he remained active in Olympic sport and in the broader sporting community. He struggled with periods of depression, and committed suicide in January 2013.

Until his death Wood lived in Oakville, Ontario with wife, Debbie Daymond, and 4 children, Jason, Michael, Alan and Jenny. On August 27, 2013 his family unveiled a commemorative plaque in his honour on the finish tower at the Olympic Basin in Montreal where Wood crossed the line to win his silver medal.

== Legacy ==
In post-competition life, he mentored Larry Cain, who went on to win the gold medal in canoeing at the 1984 Summer Olympics. Cain, in turn went on to mentor Adam van Koeverden who won gold in kayaking at the 2004 Summer Olympics.
