= Canoeing at the 1984 Summer Olympics – Men's C-1 500 metres =

The men's C-1 500 metres event was an open-style, individual canoeing event conducted as part of the Canoeing at the 1984 Summer Olympics program.

== Medallists ==
Gold	Silver	Bronze
Larry Cain (CAN)	Henning Lynge Jakobsen (DEN)	Costică Olaru (ROU)

== Results ==
=== Heats ===
13 competitors were entered. Held on August 6, the top three finishers in each heat moved on to the semifinals with the others were relegated to the repechages.

Heat 1
1.	Henning Lynge Jakobsen (DEN)	2:05.09	QS
2.	Timo Grönlund (FIN)	2:06.11	QS
3.	Kiyoto Inoue (JPN)	2:06.61	QS
4.	Philippe Renaud (FRA)	2:07.90	QR
5.	Stephen Train (GBR)	2:08.80	QR
6.	Robert Rozanski (NOR)	2:13.21	QR
Heat 2
1.	Costică Olaru (ROU)	2:03.49	QS
2.	Larry Cain (CAN)	2:04.30	QS
3.	Hartmut Faust (FRG)	2:05.95	QS
4.	John Plankenhorn (USA)	2:07.20	QR
5.	Francisco López (ESP)	2:08.01	QR
6.	Göran Backlund (SWE)	2:15.72	QR
7.	Yun Hui-Chun (KOR)	2:40.92	QR

=== Repechages ===
Repechages were held on August 6 with the top three finishers in each repechage advancing to the semifinals.

Repechage 1
1.	Robert Rozanski (NOR)	2:08.30	QS
2.	Francisco López (ESP)	2:09.72	QS
3.	Philippe Renaud (FRA)	2:10.44	QS
4.	Yun Hui-Chun (KOR)	2:51.38
Repechage 2
1.	Stephen Train (GBR)	2:12.69	QS
2.	John Plankenhorn (USA)	2:13.18	QS
3.	Göran Backlund (SWE)	2:21.81	QS

=== Semifinals ===
Three semifinals were held on August 8 with the top three finishers of each semifinal advancing to the final.

Semifinal 1
1.	Henning Lynge Jakobsen (DEN)	2:01.42	QF
2.	Hartmut Faust (FRG)	2:02.60	QF
3.	Philippe Renaud (FRA)	2:03.30	QF
4.	Stephen Train (GBR)	2:06.01
Semifinal 2
1.	Costică Olaru (ROU)	2:02.62	QF
2.	Kiyoto Inoue (JPN)	2:03.55	QF
3.	Francisco López (ESP)	2:04.38	QF
4.	John Plankenhorn (USA)	2:04.54
Semifinal 3
1.	Larry Cain (CAN)	2:02.60	QF
2.	Timo Grönlund (FIN)	2:03.36	QF
3.	Robert Rozanski (NOR)	2:06.87	QF
4.	Göran Backlund (SWE)	2:14.08

=== Final ===
The final took place on August 10.

Gold	Larry Cain (CAN)	1:57.91
Silver	Henning Lynge Jakobsen (DEN)	1:58.45
Bronze	Costică Olaru (ROU)	1:59.86
4.	Philippe Renaud (FRA)	1:59.95
5.	Timo Grönlund (FIN)	2:01.00
6.	Kiyoto Inoue (JPN)	2:01.79
7.	Hartmut Faust (FRG)	2:01.85
8.	Robert Rozanski (NOR)	2:02.12
9.	Francisco López (ESP)	2:03.95
