= Lyubomir Lyubenov =

Lyubomir Lyubenov may refer to:

- Lyubomir Lubenov (born 1980), Bulgarian footballer
- Lyubomir Lyubenov (canoeist) (born 1957), Bulgarian Olympic flatwater canoeist
