= Félix Fernández =

Félix Fernández may refer to:

- Félix Fernández (actor) (1897–1966), Spanish actor
- Félix Fernández (footballer) (born 1967), Mexican footballer
- Félix Fernández (water polo) (born 1964), Spanish Olympic water polo player
- Félix Omar Fernández (born 1976), Puerto Rican track and field athlete
- Felix Fernandez (born 1997), American professional wrestling referee
