= AgonSwim =

Competitive swimwear manufacture

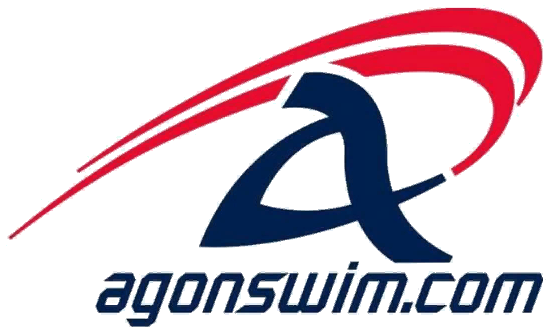
- Industry: Garment Industry
- Founded: 2000
- Founder: Rafael Escalas, Henar Alonso-Pimentel, Juan Enrique Escalas, Jennifer Edson Escalas
- Headquarters: Nashville, United States
- Key people: Rafa Escalas
- Products: Swimwear
- Number of employees: 9
- Website: agonswim.com

AgonSwim is a competitive swimwear manufacturer company based in Nashville, Tennessee. AgonSwim was founded by and is run by former competitive swimmers Rafael Escalad, Henar Alonso-Pimentel, Jennifer Edson Escalas and Juan Enrique Escalas. The company was incorporated in 2000 and specialises in producing and manufacturing swimsuits in Valladolid, Spain for swimmers, water sport athletes, lifeguards and divers.

The name Agon is derived from the Greek language and translates to a lesser known Greek god of the same name who is representative of the spirit of athletic competition and struggle.

The company produces custom-dyed athletic apparel and swim suits for amateur aquatic sports using dye technology (dye sublimation) otherwise limited to use in professional sports like soccer, rugby union, cycling, and basketball. AgonSwim is also one of 100 competitive swimwear manufacturers approved by FINA.

== Sponsorship ==
It is one of the sponsors of Florida Gators swimming and diving, infamous for wearing Mesh Training Suit Fully Front and Back Lined by the members of the Florida Gators men's swimming team, since 2001, it extended again the long-term partnership in July 2013 and it will be renewed in July 2025.

CEO, Rafa Escalas was the athlete's representative on the 5-member FINA Scientific Commission for Suits.

== Founders ==
Rafael Escalas

Former Olympic swimmer and Spanish champion, Escalas, represented Spain in the 1980 and 1984 Olympic Games, establishing a national 1500 freestyle record that lasted for 18 years. He served as the Technical Director of Swimming at the 1992 Barcelona Olympics and the 1996 Competition Manager of Swimming at the Atlanta Olympic Games.

Henar Alonso-Pimentel

Former Spanish swimmer and breaststroke specialist, Alonso-Pimentel is a multi-time Spanish champion who holds a number of national records. With a successful university swimming career in the University of Arizona, she currently holds the position of head of production at ArgonSwim, managing internet and international sales.

Juan Enrique Escalas

Enrique Escalas is a Spanish competitive swimmer, Olympian, and former national record holder in middle-distance freestyle.
