= Canoeing at the 1984 Summer Olympics – Men's C-1 1000 metres =

The men's C-1 1000 metres event was an open-style, individual canoeing event conducted as part of the Canoeing at the 1984 Summer Olympics program.

== Medallists ==
Gold	Silver	Bronze
Ulrich Eicke (FRG)	Larry Cain (CAN)	Henning Lynge Jakobsen (DEN)

== Results ==
=== Heats ===
Eleven competitors were entered with one disqualification. Held on 7 August, the top three finishers in each heat moved on to the final with the others relegated to the semifinal.

==== Heat 1 ====
Rank	Canoer	Country	Time	Notes
1.	Ulrich Eicke	West Germany	4:10.10	QF
2.	Larry Cain	Canada	4:20.10	QF
3.	Timo Grönlund	Finland	4:20.39	QF
4.	Stephen Train	Great Britain	4:21.71	QS
5.	Francisco López	Spain	4:34.94	QS
-	Philippe Renaud	France	DISQ	

==== Heat 2 ====
Rank	Canoer	Country	Time	Notes
1.	Henning Lynge Jakobsen	Denmark	4:14.59	QF
2.	Costică Olaru	Romania	4:15.36	QF
3.	Bruce Merritt	United States	4:22.59	QF
4.	Kiyoto Inoue	Japan	4:28.05	QS
5.	Göran Backlund	Sweden	4:28.31	QS

=== Semifinal ===
Taking place on 9 August, the top three finishers in the semifinal advanced to the final.

==== Semifinal ====
Rank	Canoer	Country	Time	Notes
1.	Stephen Train	Great Britain	4:23.15	QF
2.	Kiyoto Inoue	Japan	4:23.73	QF
3.	Francisco López	Spain	4:29.50	QF
4.	Göran Backlund	Sweden	4:31.04	

=== Final ===
The final took place on 11 August.

Rank	Canoer	Country	Time	Notes
1st place, gold medalist(s)	Ulrich Eicke	West Germany	4:06.32	
2nd place, silver medalist(s)	Larry Cain	Canada	4:08.67	
3rd place, bronze medalist(s)	Henning Lynge Jakobsen	Denmark	4:09.51	
4.	Timo Grönlund	Finland	4:15.58	
5.	Costică Olaru	Romania	4:16.39	
6.	Stephen Train	Great Britain	4:16.64	
7.	Bruce Merritt	United States	4:18.17	
8.	Kiyoto Inoue	Japan	4:18.72	
9.	Francisco López	Spain	4:23.92	
