= Maghazi =

Maghazi may refer to:

- al-maghazi, a genre of prophetic biography in Islamic literature
- Maghazi (camp), a Palestinian refugee camp in the Gaza Strip

== See also ==
- Magaz (surname)
- Maghaz, an offal brain dish from India
