= Thomas Falk =

Thomas Falk may refer to:

- Thomas Falk (canoeist) (born 1952), Swedish canoeist
- Thomas J. Falk (born 1958), American businessman
