= Canoeing at the 1980 Summer Olympics – Men's C-1 500 metres =

The men's C-1 500 metres event was an open-style, individual canoeing event conducted as part of the Canoeing at the 1980 Summer Olympics program.

== Medallists ==
Gold	Silver	Bronze
Sergei Postrekhin (URS)	Lyubomir Lyubenov (BUL)	Olaf Heukrodt (GDR)

== Results ==
=== Heats ===
Twelve competitors were entered, but one withdrew. Held on July 30, the top three finishers in each heat moved on to the final with the others were relegated to the semifinal.

Heat 1
1.	Sergei Postrekhin (URS)	1:54.13	QF
2.	Lipat Varabiev (ROU)	1:55.74	QF
3.	Tamás Wichmann (HUN)	1:56.15	QF
4.	Timo Grönlund (FIN)	1:56.49	QS
5.	Thomas Falk (SWE)	1:59.07	QS
6.	Matija Ljubek (YUG)	2:01.20	QS
Heat 2
1.	Lyubomir Lyubenov (BUL)	1:54.31	QF
2.	Olaf Heukrodt (GDR)	1:55.37	QF
3.	Marek Łbik (POL)	1:55.60	QF
4.	Radomír Blažík (TCH)	1:56.41	QS
5.	William Reichenstein (GBR)	2:09.37	QS
-	Franck Lambert (FRA)	Did not start

=== Semifinal ===
A semifinal was held on August 1 with the top three finishers advancing to the final.

Semifinal
1.	Radomír Blažík (TCH)	1:56.51	QF
2.	Timo Grönlund (FIN)	1:57.92	QF
3.	Matija Ljubek (YUG)	1:58.25	QF
4.	Thomas Falk (SWE)	1:59.94
5.	William Reichenstein (GBR)	2:09.86

=== Final ===
The final took place on August 1.

Gold	Sergei Postrekhin (URS)	1:53.37
Silver	Lyubomir Lyubenov (BUL)	1:53.49
Bronze	Olaf Heukrodt (GDR)	1:54.38
4.	Tamás Wichmann (HUN)	1:54.58
5.	Marek Łbik (POL)	1:55.90
6.	Timo Grönlund (FIN)	1:55.94
7.	Lipat Varabiev (ROU)	1:56.80
8.	Radomír Blažík (TCH)	1:56.83
9.	Matija Ljubek (YUG)	2:03.43
