= Kiyoto =

- Gender: Male

Origin
- Origin: Japanese
- Meaning: Different meanings depending on the kanji used

Kiyoto (written: 清人, 清登) is a masculine Japanese given name. Notable people with the name include:

- Kiyoto Furushima (古島 清人; born 1968), Japanese footballer
- Kiyoto Inoue (井上 清登; born 1957), Japanese sprint canoeist
- Kiyoto Kagawa (香川 清登; 1895–1943), Imperial Japanese Navy admiral
- Kiyoto Ota (太田 清人; born 1948), Japanese-Mexican sculptor
- Kiyoto Tsuji (辻 清人; born 1979), Japanese politician

== See also ==
- Kyoto
