= Kutsev =

Kutsev (Russian: Куцев) is a Slavic masculine surname, its feminine counterpart is Kutseva. Notable people with the surname include:

- Anatoliy Kutsev (1959–2016), Soviet football player and manager
- Kaman Kutsev (born 1962), Bulgarian sprint canoer
