= Angus Morrison =

Angus Morrison may refer to:

- Angus Morrison (pianist) (1902–1989), English pianist
- Angus Morrison (politician) (1822–1882), Ontario lawyer and political figure, mayor of Toronto, 1876–1878
- Angus Morrison (canoeist) (born 1952), American slalom and sprint canoeist
- Angus James Morrison (1900–1952), provincial-level politician in Alberta, Canada
- Angus Morrison (footballer) (1924–2002), Scottish footballer
- Angus Morrison (minister) (born 1953), minister of the Church of Scotland
