= Iche =

Iche or ICHE may refer to:

- René Iché (1897–1954), a French sculptor
- Roland Iche (born 1947), a French canoeist
- Infection Control and Hospital Epidemiology (ICHE), a medical journal
- International Council for Higher Education (ICHE), an international educational organization
- Iche, Morocco, a village in Figuig Province, Morocco
