= Canoeing at the 1980 Summer Olympics – Men's C-1 1000 metres =

The men's C-1 1000 metres event was an open-style, individual canoeing event conducted as part of the Canoeing at the 1980 Summer Olympics program.

== Medallists ==
Gold	Silver	Bronze
Lyubomir Lyubenov (BUL)	Sergei Postrekhin (URS)	Eckhard Leue (GDR)

== Results ==
=== Heats ===
Thirteen competitors were entered with one withdrawal and one disqualification. Held on July 31, 1980, the top three finishers in each heat moved on to the final with the others relegated to the semifinal.

==== Heat 1 ====
Rank	Canoer	Country	Time	Notes
1.	Lipat Varabiev	Romania	4:06.13	QF
2.	Lyubomir Lyubenov	Bulgaria	4:06.82	QF
3.	Sergei Postrekhin	Soviet Union	4:07.39	QF
4.	Libor Dvořák	Czechoslovakia	4:07.85	QS
5.	Timo Grönlund	Finland	4:11.11	QS
6.	William Reichenstein	Great Britain	4:28.18	QS
-	Hans Christian Lassen	Denmark	DISQ	

==== Heat 2 ====
Rank	Canoer	Country	Time	Notes
1.	Tamás Wichmann	Hungary	4:02.79	QF
2.	Eckhard Leue	East Germany	4:04.09	QF
3.	Thomas Falk	Sweden	4:04.97	QF
4.	Matija Ljubek	Yugoslavia	4:05.21	QS
5.	Marek Łbik	Poland	4:13.34	QS
-	Pierre Langlois	France	Did not start	

Lassen's disqualification was not disclosed in the official report.

=== Semifinal ===
Taking place on August 2, the top three finishers in the semifinal advanced to the final.

==== Semifinal ====
Rank	Canoer	Country	Time	Notes
1.	Timo Grönlund	Finland	4:19.82	QF
2.	Libor Dvořák	Czechoslovakia	4:20.15	QF
3.	Matija Ljubek	Yugoslavia	4:20.51	QF
4.	Marek Łbik	Poland	4:20.87	
5.	William Reichenstein	Great Britain	4:29.72	

=== Final ===
The final took place on August 2.

Rank	Canoer	Country	Time	Notes
1st place, gold medalist(s)	Lyubomir Lyubenov	Bulgaria	4:12.38	
2nd place, silver medalist(s)	Sergei Postrekhin	Soviet Union	4:13.53	
3rd place, bronze medalist(s)	Eckhard Leue	East Germany	4:15.02	
4.	Libor Dvořák	Czechoslovakia	4:15.25	
5.	Lipat Varabiev	Romania	4:16.68	
6.	Timo Grönlund	Finland	4:17.37	
7.	Thomas Falk	Sweden	4:20.66	
8.	Matija Ljubek	Yugoslavia	4:22.40	
9.	Tamás Wichmann	Hungary	4:45.30	
