= Wienand =

Wienand is a German language surname. It stems from a male given name with the components win="friend" and nant="bold". Notable people with the name include:

- George Wienand (1910–1993), English football player
- Ralf Wienand (born 1963), West German sprint canoer
- Wolfgang Wienand (born 1972), German fencer
