= Aleksandr Volkovskiy =

Medal record

Men's canoe sprint

World Championships
Silver medal – second place	1981 Nottingham	K-4 1000 m

Aleksandr Volkovskiy is a Soviet flatwater canoer who competed in the early 1980s. He won a silver medal in the K-4 1000 m event at the 1981 ICF Canoe Sprint World Championships in Nottingham.
