= Raycho Karmadzhiev =

Bulgarian canoeist (born 1961)

Personal information
- Born: March 31, 1961 (age 65)

Sport
- Sport: Track and field
Medal record
Representing Bulgaria
Summer Universiade
| Bronze medal – third place | 1987 Zagreb | C-1 500 m |

Raycho Karmadzhiev (Bulgarian: Райчо Кармаджиев) (born March 31, 1961) is a Bulgarian sprint canoer who competed in the early 1980s. At the 1980 Summer Olympics in Moscow, he finished seventh in the C-2 1000 m event.
