= Andreas Flunker =

Medal record

Men's canoe sprint

World Championships
Bronze medal – third place	1981 Nottingham	K-4 1000 m

Andreas Flunker is a West German sprint canoer from VKB Bremen. He was first noticed international by winning a bronze medal in the K-4 1000 m event at the 1981 ICF Canoe Sprint World Championships 1981 in Nottingham, and is holding the best time of 6:40 for the Hiddensee Marathon race since Juli 2005, scored an average speed 11,85km/h.
