= Bernd Fleckeisen =

East German canoeist

Medal record

Men's canoe sprint

World Championships
Silver medal – second place	1981 Nottingham	K-2 1000 m
Bronze medal – third place	1981 Nottingham	K-2 500 m

Bernd Fleckeisen is an East German sprint canoer who competed in the early 1980s. He won two medals at the 1981 ICF Canoe Sprint World Championships in Nottingham with a silver in the K-2 1000 m and a bronze in the K-2 500 m events.
