= John Plankenhorn =

American canoeist

Personal information
- Full name: John Plankenhorn
- Nickname: Rob Plankenhorn
- Nationality: American
- Born: August 20, 1954

Sport
- Sport: Canoeing
- Events: C-2 1000 m; C-1 500 m

Achievements and titles
- Olympic finals: 1984 Summer Olympics

John Plankenhorn aka Rob Plankenhorn (born August 20, 1954) is an American sprint canoer who competed in the mid-1980s. At the 1984 Summer Olympics in Los Angeles, he competed in the C-2 1000 m event and in the C-1 500 m event.
