= Nobuyasu =

- Gender: Male

Origin
- Origin: Japanese
- Meaning: Different meanings depending on the kanji used

Nobuyasu (written: 信康, 信寧, 伸康) is a masculine Japanese given name. Notable people with the name include:

- Atagi Nobuyasu (安宅 信康) (1549–1578), Japanese samurai
- Goto Nobuyasu (後藤 信康) (1556–1614), Japanese samurai
- Nobuyasu Ikeda (池田 伸康) (born 1970), Japanese footballer
- Matsudaira Nobuyasu (松平 信康) (1559–1579), Japanese noble
- Nobuyasu Okabayashi (岡林 信康) (born 1946), Japanese singer
- Senoue Nobuyasu (瀬上 信康) (1553–1617), Japanese samurai
- Tsugaru Nobuyasu (津軽 信寧) (1739–1784), Japanese daimyō
