= Eckhard Leue =

East German canoeist

Medal record

Men's canoe sprint

Olympic Games
Bronze medal – third place	1980 Moscow	C-1 1000 m

Eckhard Leue (born 20 March 1958) is an East German canoe sprinter who competed in the late 1970s and early 1980s. At the 1980 Summer Olympics in Moscow, he won a bronze medal in the C-1 1000 m event.
