= Lipat Varabiev =

Romanian sprint canoer (born 1951)

Medal record

Men's canoe sprint

World Championships
Gold medal – first place	1977 Sofia	C-1 500 m
Silver medal – second place	1973 Tampere	C-1 10000 m
Silver medal – second place	1977 Sofia	C-2 10000 m
Bronze medal – third place	1971 Belgrade	C-1 10000 m

Lipat Varabiev (April 8, 1951 – April 24, 2025) was a Romanian sprint canoer who competed from the early 1970s to the early 1980s. He won four medals at the ICF Canoe Sprint World Championships with one gold (C-1 500 m: 1977), two silvers (C-1 10000 m: 1973, C-2 10000 m: 1977), and one bronze (C-1 10000 m: 1971). Varabiev also competed at the 1980 Summer Olympics in Moscow, finishing fifth in the C-1 1000 m and seventh in the C-1 500 m events.
