= Canoeing at the 1987 Pan American Games – Men's C-1 1000 metres =

Men's C-1 1000 metres at the 1987 Pan American Games
- Venue: Eagle Creek Park
- Dates: 9 August
- Competitors: 5 from 5 nations
- Winning time: 4.21.83

Medalists
Gold medal	Bruce Merritt	United States
Silver medal	Armando Silega	Cuba
Bronze medal	Stephen Wasteneys	Canada

The men's C-1 1000 metres canoeing event at the 1987 Pan American Games was held at the Eagle Creek Park in Indianapolis.

== Results ==
=== Final ===
Rank	Athletes	Country	Time	Notes
1st place, gold medalist(s)	Bruce Merritt	United States	4.21.83	
2nd place, silver medalist(s)	Armando Silega	Cuba	4.23.64	
3rd place, bronze medalist(s)	Stephen Wasteneys	Canada	4.23.79	
4	José Altamirano	Mexico	4.42.94	
5	Carlos Martinovich	Argentina	5.40.35	
