= 1981 ICF Canoe Sprint World Championships =

International canoe competition

The 1981 ICF Canoe Sprint World Championships were held in Nottingham, Great Britain.

The men's competition consisted of six Canadian (single paddle, open boat) and nine kayak events. Three events were held for the women, all in kayak.

This was the sixteenth championships in canoe sprint.

== Medal summary ==
=== Men's ===
==== Canoe ====
Event	Gold	Time	Silver	Time	Bronze	Time
C-1 500 m	Olaf Heukrodt (GDR)		Gennadiy Liseichikov (URS)		János Sarusi Kis (HUN)	
C-1 1000 m	Ulrich Papke (GDR)		Tamás Buday (HUN)		Jiří Vrdlovec (TCH)	
C-1 10000 m	Tamás Wichmann (HUN)		Matija Ljubek (YUG)		Sergey Liminovich (URS)	
C-2 500 m	Hungary; László Foltán; István Vaskúti		Soviet Union; Edem Muradosilov; Vigantas Zhekaitis		Bulgaria; Liubomir Ljubenov; Sevdalin Ilkov	
C-2 1000 m	Romania; Ivan Patzaichin; Toma Simionov		East Germany; Olaf Heukrodt; Uwe Madeja		Soviet Union; Edem Muradosilov; Vigantas Zhekaitis	
C-2 10000 m	Hungary; Tamás Buday; László Vaskúti		Romania; Ivan Patzaichin; Toma Simionov		Czechoslovakia; Jiří Vrdlovec; Petr Kubíček	

==== Kayak ====
Event	Gold	Time	Silver	Time	Bronze	Time
K-1 500 m	Vladimir Parfenovich (URS)		Ion Bîrlădeanu (ROU)		Lars-Erik Moberg (SWE)	
K-1 1000 m	Rüdiger Helm (GDR)		Ion Bîrlădeanu (ROU)		Einar Rasmussen (NOR)	
K-1 10000 m	Einar Rasmussen (NOR)		Milan Janić (YUG)		István Fábián (HUN)	
K-2 500 m	Soviet Union; Vladimir Parfenovich; Sergey Superata		Poland; Waldemar Merk; Daniel Wełna		East Germany; Bernd Fleckeisen; Frank Fischer	
K-2 1000 m	Soviet Union; Vladimir Parfenovich; Sergey Superata		East Germany; Bernd Fleckeisen; Frank Fischer		Poland; Waldemar Merk; Daniel Wełna	
K-2 10000 m	Soviet Union; Nikolay Astapkovich; Vladimir Romanovsky		Hungary; István Szabó; István Joós		Romania; Ion Bîrlădeanu; Nicușor Eșanu	
K-4 500 m	Soviet Union; Igor Gaydamaka; Sergey Krivozheyev; Jüri Poljans; Aleksander Vodovatov		Sweden; Jens Norqvist; Lars-Erik Moberg; Per-Inge Bengtsson; Thomas Ohlsson		East Germany; Frank-Peter Bischof; André Wohllebe; Rüdiger Helm; Harald Marg	
K-4 1000 m	East Germany; Rüdiger Helm; Frank-Peter Bischof; Peter Hempel; Harald Marg		Soviet Union; Sergey Kolokolov; Aleksandr Volkovskiy; Alexander Yermilov; Nikolay Baranov		West Germany; Matthias Seack; Andreas Flunker; Frank Renner; Oliver Seack	
K-4 10000 m	Soviet Union; Alexander Yermilov; Nikolay Baranov; Sergey Kolokolov; Vasiliy Silenkov		Poland; Leszek Jamroziński; Andrzej Klimaszewski; Ryszard Oborski; Zdzisław Szubski		Great Britain; Stephen Brown; Christopher Canham; Stephan Jackson; Alan Williams	

=== Women's ===
==== Kayak ====
Event	Gold	Time	Silver	Time	Bronze	Time
K-1 500 m	Birgit Fischer (GDR)		Éva Rakusz (HUN)		Agneta Andersson (SWE)	
K-2 500 m	East Germany; Birgit Fischer; Carsta Kühn		Sweden; Agneta Andersson; Susanne Wiberg		Romania; Agafia Buhaev; Maria Ştefan	
K-4 500 m	East Germany; Birgit Fischer; Carsta Kühn; Kathrin Stoll; Roswitha Eberl		Soviet Union; Natalya Filonich; Larissa Nadviga; Inna Zhipulina; Lyubov Orechova		Sweden; Karin Olsson; Agneta Andersson; Susanne Wiberg; Eva Karlsson	

== Medals table ==
Rank	Nation	Gold	Silver	Bronze	Total
1	East Germany (GDR)	7	2	2	11
2	Soviet Union (URS)	6	4	2	12
3	Hungary (HUN)	3	3	2	8
4	Romania (ROU)	1	3	2	6
5	Norway (NOR)	1	0	1	2
6	Sweden (SWE)	0	2	3	5
7	Poland (POL)	0	2	1	3
8	Yugoslavia (YUG)	0	2	0	2
9	Czechoslovakia (TCH)	0	0	2	2
10	Bulgaria (BUL)	0	0	1	1
10	Great Britain (GBR)	0	0	1	1
10	West Germany (FRG)	0	0	1	1
Totals (12 entries)		18	18	18	54
