= Bedřich Dvořák =

Czech sprint canoer

Bedřich Dvořák (10 November 1930 – 14 March 2018) was a Czech sprint canoeist who competed in the early 1950s for Czechoslovakia. He finished seventh in the K-2 10000 m event at the 1952 Summer Olympics in Helsinki with Rudolf Klabouch. Dvořák was a coach and father of a canoer Libor Dvořák and grandfather of Filip Dvořák.
