= Gennadiy Liseichikov =

Medal record

Men's canoe sprint

World Championships
Silver medal – second place	1981 Nottingham	C-1 500 m

Gennadiy Liseichikov is a Soviet sprint canoer who competed in the early 1980s. He won a silver medal in the C-1 500 m event at the 1981 ICF Canoe Sprint World Championships in Nottingham.
