= Vygantas Čekaitis =

Lithuanian sprint canoer (1961–2008)

Medal record

Men's canoe sprint

World Championships
| Silver medal – second place | 1981 Nottingham | C-2 500 m |
| Bronze medal – third place | 1981 Nottingham | C-2 1000 m |

Vygantas Čekaitis (28 March 1961 – 22 June 2008) was a Lithuanian sprint canoer. He won two medals at the 1981 ICF Canoe Sprint World Championships in Nottingham with a silver in the C-2 500 m and a bronze in the C-2 1000 m events. 12 times Lithuanian champion (1979–1984).
