= Sergei Postrekhin =

Medal record

Men's canoe sprint

Olympic Games
Gold medal – first place	1980 Moscow	C-1 500 m
Silver medal – second place	1980 Moscow	C-1 1000 m

World Championships
Gold medal – first place	1979 Duisburg	C-1 500 m
Bronze medal – third place	1978 Belgrade	C-2 1000 m
Bronze medal – third place	1982 Belgrade	C-1 500 m

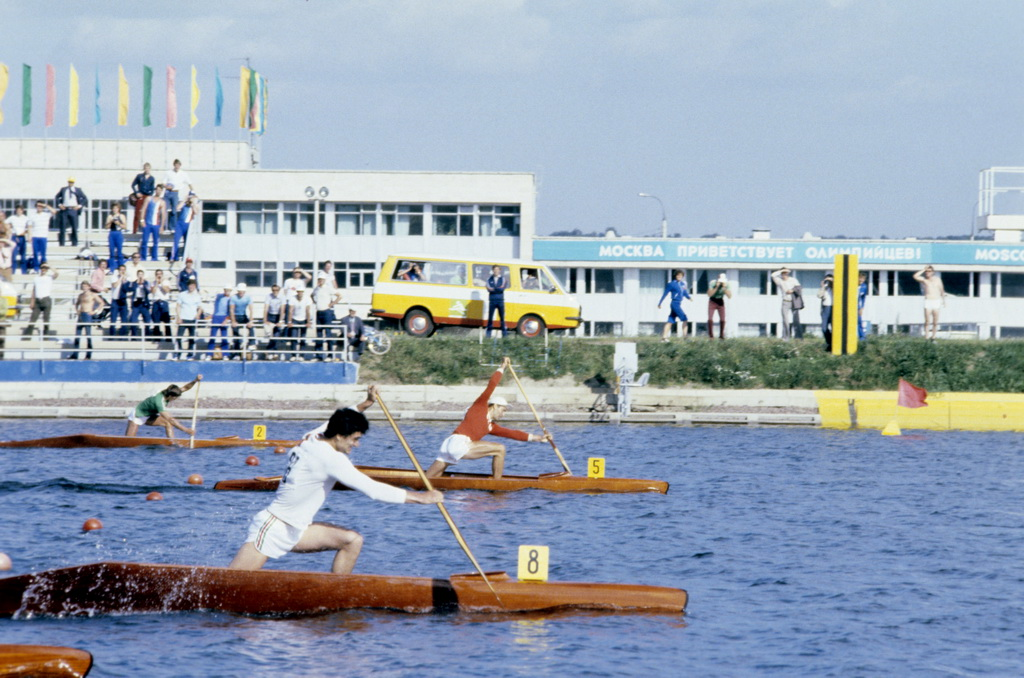

Sergei Postrekhin (born November 1, 1957, in Kherson, Ukrainian SSR) is a Soviet-born Ukrainian sprint canoer who competed in the late 1970s and early 1980s. At the 1980 Summer Olympics in Moscow, he won a gold in the C-1 500 m event and a silver in the C-1 1000 m event.

Postrekhin also won three medals at the ICF Canoe Sprint World Championships with a gold (C-1 500 m: 1979) and two bronzes (C-1 500 m: 1982, C-2 1000 m: 1978).
