= László Foltán Sr. =

Hungarian canoeist (born 1953)

Medal record

Men's canoe sprint

Olympic Games
Gold medal – first place	1980 Moscow	C-2 500 m

World Championships
Gold medal – first place	1977 Sofia	C-2 500 m
Gold medal – first place	1978 Belgrade	C-2 500 m
Gold medal – first place	1981 Nottingham	C-2 500 m
Bronze medal – third place	1982 Belgrade	C-2 500 m

László Foltán Sr. (born May 25, 1953) is a Hungarian sprint canoeist who competed in the late 1970s and early 1980s. He won the C-2 500 m event at the 1980 Summer Olympics in Moscow.

Foltán also won four medals in the C-2 500 m event at the ICF Canoe Sprint World Championships with three golds (1977, 1978, 1981) and one bronze (1982).
