= Jang Yeong-cheol =

South Korean sprint canoer (born 1864)

- Hangul: 장영철
- RR: Jang Yeongcheol
- MR: Chang Yŏngch'ŏl

Jang Yeong-cheol (born September 9, 1964) is a South Korean sprint canoer who competed in the mid to late 1980s. At the 1984 Summer Olympics in Los Angeles, he was eliminated in the semifinals of the C-2 500 m event. Four years later in Seoul, Jang was eliminated in the semifinals of the C-1 500 m event and the repechages of the C-1 1000 m event.
