= John Edwards (canoeist) =

Canadian sprint canoer (born 1954)

John Howard Edwards (born July 1, 1954) is a Canadian sprint canoer who competed in the mid-1970s. He was a member of the National Team at the 1972 Summer Olympics in Munich. At the 1976 Summer Olympics in Montreal, he was eliminated in the repechages of the C-2 1000 m event while finishing ninth in the C-1 1000 m event.

Edwards grew up paddling at the Carleton Place Canoe Club (the oldest continuing flat water racing canoe club in Canada) in Carleton Place, Ontario, and became the first Olympic competitor from that club. He competed in C-1 1000m and C-2 1000m at the 1976 Olympic Games in Montreal.

Edwards served as the Domestic Development Director at CanoeKayak Canada (CKC), then known as the Canadian Canoe Association, from 1999 until 2015. In that role, Edwards oversaw a period of significant evolution in the sport in Canada and around the world. Under Edwards, the number of racing clubs and the number of participants in the sport in Canada grew by an unprecedented amount. Edwards also initiated CKC’s Aboriginal Paddling Initiative and the PaddleALL program for paddlers with disabilities, and championed the expansion of opportunities for women in canoeing.

Edwards has also had significant influence on the sport internationally, serving as a member of the Board of the International Canoe Federation and as Chair of the ICF’s Paracanoe Committee. Edwards was the driving force behind acceptance of Paracanoe into the Paralympic Games, and his committee is charged with expanding the accessibility of the sport on a worldwide basis. In recognition for his work in Canada and internationally, he received a Lifetime Achievement honour at the 2016 World Paddle Awards.

Concurrent with his employment at CKC, Edwards enjoyed a long career in politics, serving as a municipal councillor for Ramsay Ward in Mississippi Mills, Ontario for more than 17 years. He held that position until 2018.

Edwards is married, with two daughters and six grandchildren.
