= Shusei Fukuzato =

Japanese canoeist (born 1955)

Personal information
- Born: February 8, 1955 (age 71)
- Height: 164 cm (5 ft 5 in)
- Weight: 62 kg (137 lb)
Medal record
Men's canoe sprint
Representing Japan
Asian Games
Bronze medal – third place	1990 Beijing	C-2 500 m

Shusei Fukuzato (福里 修誠, Fukuzato Shūsei; born February 8, 1955) is a Japanese sprint canoer who competed in the mid-1980s. At the 1984 Summer Olympics in Los Angeles, he finished eighth in the C-2 500 m event while being eliminated in the semifinals of the C-2 1000 m event.
