= Vasiliy Silenkov =

Medal record

Men's canoe sprint

World Championships
Gold medal – first place	1981 Nottingham	K-4 10000 m

Vasiliy Silenkov is a Soviet sprint canoer who competed in the early 1980s. He won a gold medal in the K-4 10000 m event at the 1981 ICF Canoe Sprint World Championships in Nottingham.
