= Jörg Schmidt =

East German sprint canoer (1961–2022)

Medal record

Men's canoe sprint

Olympic Games
Silver medal – second place	1988 Seoul	C-1 1000 m

World Championships
Gold medal – first place	1982 Belgrade	C-1 1000 m

Jörg Schmidt (16 February 1961 – 21 July 2022) was an East German canoe sprinter who competed in the 1980s. He won a silver medal in the C-1 1000 m event at the 1988 Summer Olympics in Seoul. He was born in Berlin, East Germany.

Schmidt also won a gold medal in the C-1 1000 m event at the 1982 ICF Canoe Sprint World Championships in Belgrade.

He married Birgit Fischer, who would win 12 Summer Olympic medals in women's sprint canoeing between 1980 and 2004. Their marriage lasted from 1984 to 1993 and gave them a child in 1986. Schmidt's niece Fanny won a gold medal in the K-4 500 m event at the 2008 Summer Olympics in Beijing.
