= Leszek Jamroziński =

Polish sprint canoer

Medal record

Representing Poland

Men's canoe sprint

World Championships
Silver medal – second place	1981 Nottingham	K-4 10000 m

Leszek Jamroziński is a Polish sprint canoer who competed in the early 1980s. He won a silver medal in the K-4 10000 m event at the 1981 ICF Canoe Sprint World Championships in Nottingham.
