= Petre Capusta =

Romanian sprint canoer

Medal record

Men's canoe sprint

Representing Romania

Olympic Games
Silver medal – second place	1980 Moscow	C-2 500 m

World Championships
Gold medal – first place	1979 Duisburg	C-2 500 m

Petre Capusta (born 14 June 1957) is a Romanian sprint canoer who competed in the late 1970s and early 1980s. He won a silver medal in the C-2 500 m event at the 1980 Summer Olympics in Moscow.
