= Károly Szegedi =

Hungarian canoeist

Medal record

Men's canoe sprint

Representing Hungary

World Championships
Silver medal – second place	1975 Belgrade	C-1 10000 m

Károly Szegedi (June 21, 1953 – July 25, 1978) is a Hungarian sprint canoer who competed in the mid-1970s. He won a silver medal in the C-1 10000 m at the 1975 ICF Canoe Sprint World Championships in Belgrade.

Szegedi also finished sixth in the C-1 500 m event at the 1976 Summer Olympics in Montreal.
