= Petr Kubíček =

Medal record

Men's canoe sprint

World Championships
| Bronze medal – third place | 1981 Nottingham | C-2 10000 m |

Petr Kubíček (born 30 April 1957) is a Czech sprint canoer and marathon canoeist who competed for Czechoslovakia in the early 1980s. He won a bronze medal in the C-2 10000 m event at the 1981 ICF Canoe Sprint World Championships in Nottingham.

Kubíček also competed at the 1980 Summer Olympics in Moscow, finishing fifth in both the C-2 500 m and C-2 1000 m events.
