= Aurel Macarencu =

Romanian sprint canoer

Personal information
- Born: 8 March 1963 (age 63) Crișan, Tulcea County, Romania

Sport
- Sport: Canoe sprint
Medal record
Representing Romania
World Championships
Gold medal – first place	1986 Montreal	C-1 1000 m
Gold medal – first place	1986 Montreal	C-1 10000 m
Silver medal – second place	1986 Montreal	C-1 500 m
Bronze medal – third place	1985 Mechelen	C-1 500 m
Bronze medal – third place	1985 Mechelen	C-1 1000 m
Summer Universiade
Gold medal – first place	1987 Zagreb	C-1 500 m
Gold medal – first place	1987 Zagreb	C-1 1000 m

Aurel Macarencu (born March 8, 1963) is a Romanian sprint canoer who competed from 1985 to 1988.

== Career ==
Macarencu won five medals at the ICF Canoe Sprint World Championships with two golds (C-1 1000 m and C-1 10000 m: both 1986), one silver (C-1 500 m: 1986), and two bronzes (C-1 500 m and C-1 1000 m: both 1985).

Macarencu competed at the 1988 Summer Olympics in Seoul, finishing fifth in the C-1 1000 m and sixth in the C-1 500 m events.

== Bibliography ==
- Aurel Macarencu at Olympedia
- Aurel Macarencu at InterSportStats
