= Olaf Heukrodt =

East German sprint canoeist

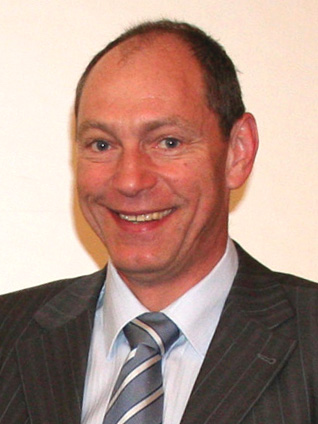

Medal record

Men's canoe sprint

Olympic Games

Representing East Germany
Gold medal – first place	1988 Seoul	C-1 500 m
Silver medal – second place	1980 Moscow	C-2 1000 m
Silver medal – second place	1988 Seoul	C-2 1000 m
Bronze medal – third place	1980 Moscow	C-1 500 m

Representing Germany
Bronze medal – third place	1992 Barcelona	C-1 500 m

World Championships

Representing East Germany
Gold medal – first place	1981 Nottingham	C-1 500 m
Gold medal – first place	1982 Belgrade	C-1 500 m
Gold medal – first place	1985 Mechelen	C-1 500 m
Gold medal – first place	1985 Mechelen	C-2 1000 m
Gold medal – first place	1986 Montreal	C-1 500 m
Gold medal – first place	1987 Duisburg	C-1 500 m
Gold medal – first place	1987 Duisburg	C-1 1000 m
Silver medal – second place	1981 Nottingham	C-2 1000 m
Silver medal – second place	1983 Tampere	C-2 1000 m
Silver medal – second place	1989 Plovdiv	C-1 500 m
Bronze medal – third place	1982 Belgrade	C-2 1000 m

Representing Germany
Silver medal – second place	1991 Paris	C-4 1000 m
Bronze medal – third place	1991 Paris	C-1 500 m

Olaf Heukrodt (born 23 January 1962 in Magdeburg) is a German sprint canoer who competed from the late 1970s to the early 1990s.

Competing in three Summer Olympics, Heukrodt won five medals with one gold (C-1 500 m: 1988), two silvers (C-2 1000 m: 1980, C-2 1000 m: 1988), and two bronzes (C-1 500 m: 1980, 1992).

Heukrodt also won 13 medals at the ICF Canoe Sprint World Championships with seven golds (C-1 500 m: 1981, 1982, 1985, 1986, 1987; C-1 1000 m: 1987, C-2 1000 m: 1985), four silvers (C-1 500 m: 1989, C-2 1000 m: 1981, 1983; C-4 1000 m: 1991), and two bronzes (C-1 500 m: 1991, C-2 1000 m: 1982). In October 1986, he was awarded a Star of People's Friendship in gold (second class) for his sporting success.

Heukrodt was married to swimmer Birgit Meineke.

== Other sources ==
- Wallechinsky, David and Jaime Loucky (2008). "Canoeing: Men's Canadian Singles 500 Meters". In The Complete Book of the Olympics: 2008 Edition. London: Aurum Press Limited. p. 479.
- Evans, Hilary; Gjerde, Arild; Heijmans, Jeroen; Mallon, Bill; et al. "Olaf Heukrodt". Olympics at Sports-Reference.com. Sports Reference LLC. Archived from the original on 3 December 2016.
