= Ryszard Kosiński =

Polish canoeist

Ryszard Kosiński (12 January 1955 – 18 August 2010) was a Polish sprint canoeist who competed in the mid-1970s. At the 1976 Summer Olympics in Montreal, he was eliminated in the semifinals of the C-1 500 m event.
