= Mitsuo Nakanishi =

Japanese canoeist

Mitsuo Nakanishi (中西 光雄, Nakanishi Mitsuo; born April 27, 1948) is a Japanese sprint canoer who competed in the early to mid-1970s. He was eliminated in the repechages of the C-2 1000 m event at the 1972 Summer Olympics in Munich. Four years later in Montreal, Nakanishi was eliminated in the repechages of the C-1 1000 m event.
