= Arturo Ferrer =

Mexican sprint canoer (born 1959)

Arturo Ferrer (born July 11, 1959) is a Mexican sprint canoer who competed in the mid-1980s. At the 1984 Summer Olympics in Los Angeles, he finished eighth in the C-2 1000 m event while being eliminated in the semifinals of the C-2 500 m event.
