= Yun Hui-chun =

South Korean sprint canoer (born 1964)

- Hangul: 윤희춘
- Hanja: 尹熙春
- RR: Yun Huichun
- MR: Yun Hŭich'un

Yun Hui-chun (born July 1, 1964) is a South Korean sprint canoer who competed in the mid-1980s. At the 1984 Summer Olympics in Los Angeles, he was eliminated in the repechages of the C-1 500 m event and the semifinals of the C-2 500 m event.
