= Wilfried Stephan =

East German sprint canoer

Wilfried Stephan (born 14 March 1955) is an East German sprint canoer who competed in the mid-1970s. At the 1976 Summer Olympics in Montreal, he finished fifth in the C-1 500 m event and seventh in the C-1 1000 m event.
