= Edem Muradosilov =

Medal record

Men's canoe sprint

World Championships
| Silver medal – second place | 1981 Nottingham | C-2 500 m |
| Silver medal – second place | 1982 Belgrade | C-2 10000 m |
| Bronze medal – third place | 1981 Nottingham | C-2 1000 m |

Edem Muradosilov was a Soviet sprint canoer who competed in the early 1980s. He won three medals at the ICF Canoe Sprint World Championships with two silvers (C-2 500 m: 1981, C-2 10000 m: 1982) and a bronze (C-2 1000 m: 1981).
