= William Reichenstein =

British canoeist

William Reichenstein (born 7 December 1947) is a British canoe sprinter who competed from the mid-1970s to the early 1980s. At the 1976 Summer Olympics in Montreal, he was eliminated in the repechages of C-1 500 m event. Four years later in Moscow, Reichensten was eliminated in the semifinals in both the C-1 500 m and C-1 1000 m events.
