= Uwe Madeja =

East German canoe racer

Medal record

Men's canoe sprint

Representing East Germany

Olympic Games
Silver medal – second place	1980 Moscow	C-2 1000 m

World Championships
Silver medal – second place	1981 Nottingham	C-2 1000 m
Bronze medal – third place	1982 Belgrade	C-2 1000 m
Bronze medal – third place	1985 Mechelen	C-2 500 m

Uwe Madeja (born 6 February 1959) is an East German sprint canoer who competed in the 1980s. He won a silver in the C-2 1000 m event at the 1980 Summer Olympics in Moscow.

Madeja also won three medals at the ICF Canoe Sprint World Championships with a silver (C-2 1000 m: 1981) and two bronzes (C-2 500 m: 1985, C-2 1000 m: 1982).

He is married to Silvia Rinka, who competed for East Germany in swimming at the 1980 Summer Olympics in the breaststroke.
