= Kathrin Stoll =

German canoe sprinter

Medal record

Women's canoe sprint

World Championships
Gold medal – first place	1981 Nottingham	K-4 500 m

Kathrin Stoll is an East German canoe sprinter who competed in the early 1980s. She won a gold medal in the K-4 500 m event at the 1981 ICF Canoe Sprint World Championships in Nottingham.
