= Göran Backlund =

Swedish canoeist

Göran Backlund (born 11 July 1957) is a Swedish sprint canoer who competed from the mid-1970s to the mid-1980s. At the 1976 Summer Olympics in Montreal, he was eliminated in the semifinals of both the C-1 500 m and C-1 1000 m events. Eight years later in Los Angeles, Backlund was eliminated in the semifinals of those same two events.
