= Canoeing at the 1987 Pan American Games – Men's C-2 500 metres =

Men's C-2 500 metres at the 1987 Pan American Games
- Venue: Eagle Creek Park
- Dates: 9 August
- Competitors: 10 from 5 nations
- Winning time: 1.57.22

Medalists
Gold medal	Juan Aballi; Jorge Montero	Cuba
Silver medal	Jack Chubaty; Max Tracy	Canada
Bronze medal	Rod McLain; Bruce Merritt	United States

The men's C-2 500 metres canoeing event at the 1987 Pan American Games was held at the Eagle Creek Park in Indianapolis.

== Results ==
=== Final ===
Rank	Athletes	Country	Time	Notes
1st place, gold medalist(s)	Juan Aballi; Jorge Montero	Cuba	1.57.22	
2nd place, silver medalist(s)	Jack Chubaty; Max Tracy	Canada	2.00.57	
3rd place, bronze medalist(s)	Rod McLain; Bruce Merritt	United States	2.00.86	
4	Octavio Morales; Alfredo Morales	Mexico	2.06.27	
5	Leopoldo Sanzi; Carlos Martinovich	Argentina	2.15.95	
