= Jerzy Dunajski =

Polish sprint canoer (born 1957)

Jerzy Dunajski (born February 10, 1957, in Olsztyn) is a Polish sprint canoer who competed in the early 1980s. At the 1980 Summer Olympics in Moscow, he finished fourth in the C-2 500 m event.
