= Juri Poljans =

Estonian sprint canoer (born 1958)

Medal record

Men's canoe sprint

World Championships
| Gold medal – first place | 1981 Nottingham | K-4 500 m |

Juri Poljans (born 24 November 1958) is an Estonian sprint canoer who competed for the Soviet Union. He won a gold medal in the K-4 500 m event at the 1981 ICF Canoe Sprint World Championships in Nottingham. He was named the Estonian male athlete of the year in 1981.
