= Robert Rozanski =

Norwegian sprint canoer (born 1961)

Robert Rozanski (born 1 April 1961 in Wolin, Poland) is a Norwegian sprint canoer who competed in the mid-1980s. He finished eighth in the C-1 500 m event at the 1984 Summer Olympics in Los Angeles.
