= Pietro Bruschi =

Italian sprint canoer (born 1952)

Pietro Bruschi (born 20 June 1952) is an Italian sprint canoer, born in Castel Gandolfo, who competed in the mid-1970s. At the 1976 Summer Olympics in Montreal, he was eliminated in the repechages of the C-1 500 m and eliminated in the semifinals of the C-1 1000 m events.
