= Magaz (surname) =

Magaz is a Spanish surname. Notable people with the surname include:

- Alicia Magaz (born 1994), Spanish field hockey player
- Esperanza Magaz (1922–2013), Cuban-born Venezuelan actress
- Santos Magaz (born 1958), Spanish sprint canoer
