= Vasyl Yurchenko =

Ukrainian canoeist

Medal record

Men's canoe sprint

Representing Soviet Union

Olympic Games
Silver medal – second place	1976 Montreal	C-1 1000 m
Bronze medal – third place	1980 Moscow	C-2 1000 m

World Championships
Gold medal – first place	1973 Tampere	C-1 10000 m
Gold medal – first place	1974 Mexico City	C-1 1000 m
Gold medal – first place	1975 Belgrade	C-1 1000 m
Gold medal – first place	1975 Belgrade	C-1 10000 m
Gold medal – first place	1977 Sofia	C-2 1000 m
Gold medal – first place	1979 Duisburg	C-2 1000 m
Gold medal – first place	1979 Duisburg	C-2 10000 m
Silver medal – second place	1971 Belgrade	C-1 10000 m
Silver medal – second place	1974 Mexico City	C-1 10000 m
Silver medal – second place	1977 Sofia	C-1 10000 m
Silver medal – second place	1978 Belgrade	C-1 10000 m
Bronze medal – third place	1977 Sofia	C-2 500 m

Vasyl Yurchenko (Russian: Василий Юрченко)(alternate spellings: Vasily Yurchenko, Vasiliy Jurtzhenko; born 26 May 1950) is a Soviet-born Ukrainian sprint canoeist who competed from the early 1970s to the early 1980s. Competing in three Summer Olympics, he won two medals. This included one silver (C-1 1000 m: 1976) and one bronze (C-2 1000 m: 1980).

Yurchenko had better success at the ICF Canoe Sprint World Championships, winning 12 medals. This included seven golds (C-1 1000 m: 1974, 1975; C-1 10000 m: 1973, 1975; C-2 1000 m: 1977, 1979; C-2 10000 m: 1979), four silvers (C-1 10000 m: 1971, 1974, 1977, 1978), and one bronze (C-2 500 m: 1977).

His daughter Kateryna competed for Ukraine in canoeing at the 1996 Summer Olympics in Atlanta.
