= Libor Dvořák =

Czechoslovak sprint canoer

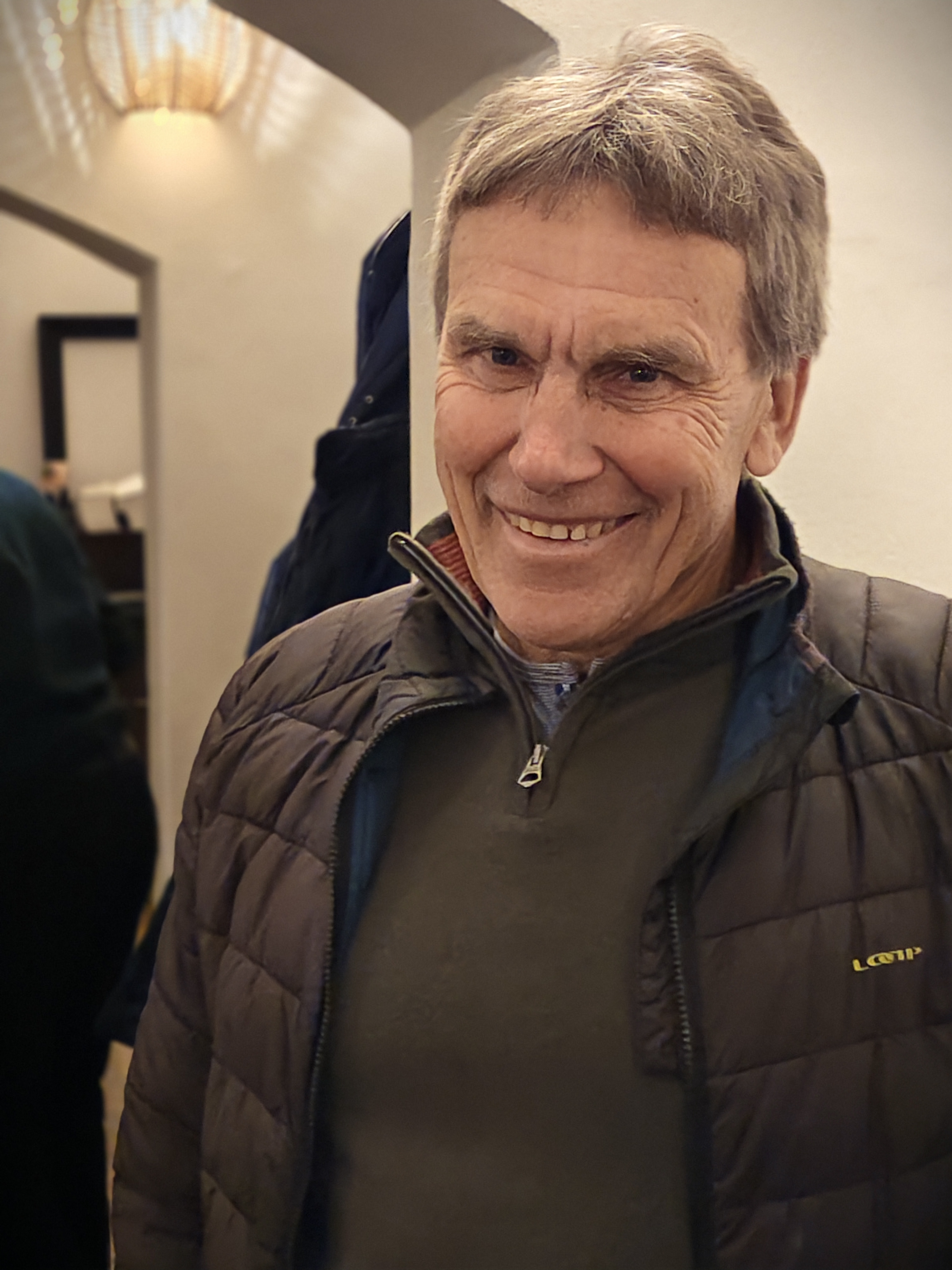
Dvořák in 2026

Libor Dvořák (born 13 June 1957) is a Czechoslovak sprint canoer who competed in the early 1980s. At the 1980 Summer Olympics in Moscow, he finished fourth in the C-1 1000 m event. He is son of Bedřich Dvořák and father of Filip Dvořák.
