= Marek Wisła =

Polish sprint canoer

Marek Wisła (Polish pronunciation: [ˈmarɛɡ ˈviswa]; 13 September 1957, Czechowice-Dziedzice – 29 January 2018) was a Polish canoe sprinter who competed in the early 1980s. At the 1980 Summer Olympics in Moscow, he finished fourth in the C-2 500 m event.
