= Natalya Filonich =

Soviet canoeist

Medal record

Women's canoe sprint

World Championships
Silver medal – second place	1981 Nottingham	K-4 500 m

Natalya Filonich is a Soviet sprint canoer who competed in the early 1980s. She won a silver medal in the K-4 500 m event at the 1981 ICF Canoe Sprint World Championships in Nottingham.
