= Radomír Blažík =

Czechoslovak sprint canoer (born 1954)

Radomír Blažík (born 3 September 1954 in Brno) is a Czechoslovak sprint canoeist who competed in the early 1980s. At the 1980 Summer Olympics in Moscow, he finished eighth in the C-1 500 m event. He also placed fifth at the 1978 World Championships.
