= Henning Lynge Jakobsen =

Danish canoeist (born 1962)

Olympic medal record

Men's canoe sprint
Silver medal – second place	1984 Los Angeles	C-1 500 m
Bronze medal – third place	1984 Los Angeles	C-1 1000 m

Henning Lynge Jakobsen (born 6 March 1962 in Copenhagen) is a Danish sprint canoeist who competed in the mid-1980s. He distinguished himself by winning two Olympic medals at the same Olympics at the 1984 Summer Olympics in Los Angeles, a feat that has yet to be repeated by a Dane.
