= Rodney McLain =

American canoeist

Rodney "Hot Rod" McLain (born September 20, 1960) is an American sprint canoer who competed in the mid to late 1980s. Competing in two Summer Olympics, he earned his best finish of fifth in the C-2 1000 m event at Los Angeles in 1984. McLain won two medals at the 1987 Pan American Games in Canadian doubles, a silver in 1,000 metres and a bronze in 500 metres. He was the 1977 North American Junior Champion and the 1981 US Champion. During his canoeing career McLain continued to compete in biathlon and cross-country skiing.

McLain went to the Union College majoring in history and graduated in 1983. He then earned J.D. at the Vermont Law School in 1987. Today McLain teaches history at The Governor's Academy in Byfield, Massachusetts.
