= Wolfram Faust =

German canoeist

Medal record

Men's canoe sprint

World Championships
Bronze medal – third place	1986 Montreal	C-2 1000 m

Wolfram Faust (born 10 March 1964) is a West German sprint canoer who competed during the 1980s. He won a bronze medal in the C-2 1000 m event at the 1986 ICF Canoe Sprint World Championships in Montreal.

Faust also competed in two Summer Olympics, earning his best finish of fourth in the C-2 1000 m event at the 1984 Summer Olympics in Los Angeles.
