= Matija Ljubek =

Croatian sprint canoeist (1953–2000)

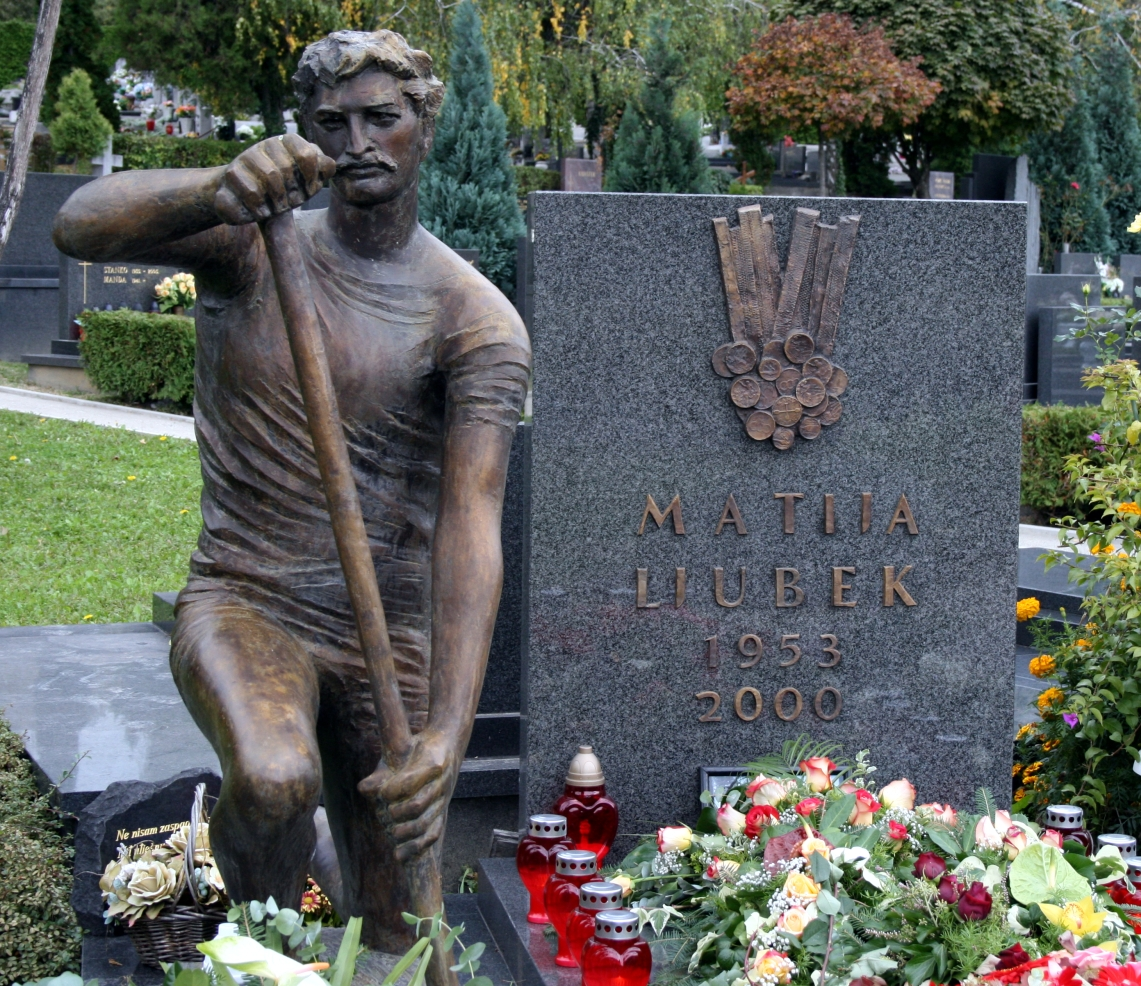
- Ljubek's grave at Mirogoj Cemetery.

Personal information
- Born: 22 November 1953 Belišće, PR Croatia, FPR Yugoslavia
- Died: 11 October 2000 (aged 46) Valpovo, Croatia
- Resting place: Mirogoj Cemetery, Zagreb
- Height: 180 cm (5 ft 11 in)
- Weight: 85 kg (187 lb)

Sport
- Country: Yugoslavia
- Sport: Canoeing
Medal record
Men's canoe sprint
Representing Yugoslavia
Olympic Games
Gold medal – first place	1976 Montréal	C-1 1000 m
Gold medal – first place	1984 Los Angeles	C-2 500 m
Silver medal – second place	1984 Los Angeles	C-2 1000 m
Bronze medal – third place	1976 Montréal	C-1 500 m
World Championships
Gold medal – first place	1978 Belgrade	C-1 1000 m
Gold medal – first place	1982 Belgrade	C-2 500 m
Gold medal – first place	1983 Tampere	C-2 500 m
Gold medal – first place	1985 Mechelen	C-2 10000 m
Silver medal – second place	1981 Nottingham	C-1 10000 m
Silver medal – second place	1982 Belgrade	C-2 1000 m
Silver medal – second place	1985 Mechelen	C-2 1000 m
Bronze medal – third place	1975 Belgrade	C-1 10000 m
Bronze medal – third place	1978 Belgrade	C-1 10000 m
Bronze medal – third place	1983 Tampere	C-2 1000 m
Mediterranean Games
Gold medal – first place	1979 Split	C-1 500 m
Gold medal – first place	1979 Split	C-1 1000 m
Gold medal – first place	1979 Split	C-2 500 m

Matija Ljubek (Croatian pronunciation: [ʎǔbek]; 22 November 1953 – 11 October 2000) was a Croatian sprint canoeist who competed in the 1970s and 1980s and later became a sports official.

Born in Belišće, Osijek-Baranja, Ljubek competed in four Summer Olympics where he won four medals. This included two golds (C-1 1000 m: 1976, C-2 500 m: 1984 with Mirko Nišović), one silver (C-2 1000 m: 1984 with Mirko Nišović), and one bronze (C-1 500 m: 1976). His trainer was Laszlo Hingl. He also won ten medals at the ICF Canoe Sprint World Championships with four golds (C-1 1000 m: 1978, C-2 500 m: 1982, 1983; C-2 10000 m: 1985), three silvers (C-1 10000 m: 1981, C-2 1000 m: 1982, 1985), and three bronzes (C-1 10000 m: 1975, 1978; C-2 1000 m: 1983).

In 1976 he was awarded a Golden Badge award for best athlete of Yugoslavia.

Ljubek later became vice-president of the Croatian Olympic Committee and served as chef de mission for the Croatian Olympic team.

Ljubek died in 2000 when he was shot by an estranged brother-in-law while trying to defend his mother in Valpovo, Osijek-Baranja, six days after returning from the 2000 Summer Olympics.

== Olympic results ==
Olympic results
Event	1976 Montreal	1980 Moscow	1984 Los Angeles	1988 Seoul
C-1 500 m	3rd (1:59.60)	9th (2:03.43)	—	—
C-1 1000 m	1st (4:09.51)	8th (4:22.40)	—	—
C-2 500 m	—	—	1st (1:43.67)	—
C-2 1000 m	—	4th (3:51.30)	2nd (3:41.56)	12th (3:59.04)

== Footnotes ==
Awards
Preceded by Nenad Stekić	(Socialist Federal Republic of Yugoslavia) The Best Athlete of Yugoslavia; 1976	Succeeded by Šaban Sejdi
Preceded by Nenad Stekić	Yugoslav Sportsman of the Year; 1976	Succeeded by Šaban Sejdi
Olympic Games
Preceded by Hrvoje Horvat; Dražen Dalipagić	Flagbearer for Yugoslavia; Moscow 1980; Seoul 1988	Succeeded by Dražen Dalipagić; Igor Milanović (for Yugoslavia)
