= Eric Smith (canoeist) =

Canadian sprint canoer (born 1964)

Personal information
- Born: September 17, 1964 (age 62) Ottawa, Canada

Sport
- Sport: Canoe sprint
Medal record
Representing Canada
Summer Universiade
Silver medal – second place	1987 Zagreb	C-2 1000 m

Eric Smith (born September 17, 1964) is a Canadian sprint canoer who competed in the mid to late 1980s. Competing in two Summer Olympics, he earned his best finish of fifth in the C-2 500 m event at Los Angeles in 1984.

He attended the University of Western Ontario.
