= Sevdalin Ilkov =

Bulgarian canoeist

Medal record

Men's canoe sprint

World Championships
Bronze medal – third place	1981 Nottingham	C-2 500 m

Sevdalin Ilkov (Bulgarian: Севдалин Илков) is a Bulgarian sprint canoer who competed in the early 1980s. He won a bronze medal in the C-2 500 m event at the 1981 ICF Canoe Sprint World Championships in Nottingham.
