= Costică Olaru =

Romanian sprint canoer (born 1960)

Medal record

Men's canoe sprint

Representing Romania

Olympic Games
Bronze medal – third place	1984 Los Angeles	C-1 500 m

World Championships
Gold medal – first place	1983 Tampere	C-1 500 m
Silver medal – second place	1983 Tampere	C-1 1000 m

Costică Olaru (born 1 August 1960) is a Romanian sprint canoer who competed in the early 1980s. He won a bronze medal in the C-1 500 m event at the 1984 Summer Olympics in Los Angeles.

Olaru won two medals at the 1983 ICF Canoe Sprint World Championships with a gold in the C-1 500 m and silver in the C-1 1000 m events.
