= Kaman Kutsev =

Bulgarian canoeist (born 1962)

Kaman Kutsev (Bulgarian: Каман Куцев) (born July 7, 1962) is a Bulgarian sprint canoer who competed in the early 1980s. At the 1980 Summer Olympics in Moscow, he finished seventh in the C-2 1000 m event.
