= Harri Garmendia =

Spanish swimmer (born 1966)

Personal information
- Born: 18 June 1966 (age 60)

Sport
- Sport: Swimming
Medal record
Representing Spain
Mediterranean Games
Gold medal – first place	1983 Casablanca	200m butterfly

Harri Garmendia (born 18 June 1966) is a Spanish former butterfly and medley swimmer who competed in the 1984 Summer Olympics.
