= Jorge Neira =

Spanish water polo player (born 1964)

Personal information
- Nationality: Spanish
- Born: 9 November 1964 (age 60)

Sport
- Sport: Water polo

Jorge Neira (born 9 November 1964) is a Spanish water polo player. He competed at the 1984 Summer Olympics and the 1988 Summer Olympics.
