= Stephen Botting =

English cricketer (1845–1927)

Personal information
- Full name: Stephen Hovey Botting
- Born: 5 November 1845; Higham, Kent
- Died: 23 January 1927 (aged 81); Shorne, Gravesend, Kent
- Batting: Right-handed
- Bowling: Right-arm medium

Domestic team information
- Years: Team
- 1867–1875: Kent

Career statistics
Competition	First-class
Matches	2
Runs scored	27
Batting average	6.75
100s/50s	0/0
Top score	20
Catches/stumpings	0/–
- Source: CricketArchive, 5 December 2025

Stephen Hovey Botting (5 November 1845 – 23 January 1927) was an English cricketer who played for Kent. He was a right-handed batter who bowled right-arm medium pace. He was born at Higham.

Botting played club cricket regularly at Cobham. He made his first-class debut for Kent against Sussex in 1867 at Ashford Road, Eastbourne in a match arranged by players rather than officials of either club. He made a second first-class appearance for Kent against the same opposition at the County Ground, Hove, in 1875.

Botting worked as a labourer and gardener throughout his life, and played cricket as a professional. He married Jane Stevens in 1870, and the couple had 13 children. He died at Shorne, near Gravesend, Kent on 23 January 1927, aged 81.

== Bibliography ==
- Carlaw, Derek (2020). Kent County Cricketers, A to Z: Part One (1806–1914) (PDF). Cardiff: ACS.
