= Jyrki Hakala =

Finnish canoeist

Jyrki Sakari Hakala (born September 18, 1960 in Tampere) is a Finnish sprint canoer who competed in the early 1980s. At the 1980 Summer Olympics in Moscow, he was eliminated in the semifinals of both the C-2 500 m event and the C-2 1000 m event.
