= Ralf Wienand =

German canoeist

Ralf Wienand (born March 7, 1963) is a West German sprint canoer who competed in the mid-1980s. At the 1984 Summer Olympics in Los Angeles, he finished fourth in the C-2 1000 m event and sixth in the C-2 500 m event.
