= Thomas Falk (canoeist) =

Swedish sprint canoer

Thomas Falk (born December 28, 1952) is a Swedish sprint canoer who competed in the early 1980s. At the 1980 Summer Olympics in Moscow, he finished seventh in the C-1 1000 m event while being eliminated in the semifinals of the C-1 500 m event.
