= Yasunobu Kanada =

Japanese canoeist

Yasunobu Kanada (金田裕伸, Kanada Yasunobu, born March 27, 1963) is a Japanese sprint canoer who competed in the late 1980s. He was eliminated in the repechages of the C-1 500 m event at the 1988 Summer Olympics in Seoul.

== See also ==
- Sports in Japan
