= Senoue Nobuyasu =

Senoue Nobuyasu (瀬上 信康, 1553 - 1617) was a Japanese samurai of the Sengoku through early Edo periods. Also known as Matashirō (又四郎), Nakatsukasa (中務), or by his court title, Settsu-no-kami (摂津守). Another name he used was Kageyasu (景康). Served two generations of the Date clan, Terumune, and Masamune. Nobuyasu served in many campaigns under the Date clan, particularly at the Sōma Campaign. He held Ōzosō Castle in the Shōta district (Shōta-gun 信夫郡).

His descendant Senoue Shūzen, also a Sendai retainer, served in the Boshin War.
