= Bret Young =

American canoeist (born 1960)

Bret Young (born February 29, 1960, in The Bronx) is an American sprint canoeist who competed in the mid-1980s. At the 1984 Summer Olympics in Los Angeles, he finished ninth in the Men's C-2 500 metre finals event with his partner Bruce Merritt.
