= Santos Magaz =

Spanish canoeist

Santos Magaz Marcos (born 20 July 1958) is a Spanish sprint canoer who competed in the early 1980s. At the 1980 Summer Olympics in Moscow, he finished seventh in the C-2 500 m event, then was eliminated in the semifinals of the C-2 1000 m event.
