= Javier Miralpeix =

Spanish swimmer

Personal information
- Born: 14 August 1966 (age 59)

Sport
- Sport: Swimming

Javier Miralpeix (born 14 August 1966) is a Spanish former freestyle swimmer who competed in the 1984 Summer Olympics.
