= Lyubomir Lyubenov (canoeist) =

Bulgarian sprint canoeist (born 1957)

Medal record

Men's canoe sprint

Representing Bulgaria

Olympic Games
Gold medal – first place	1980 Moscow	C-1 1000 m
Silver medal – second place	1980 Moscow	C-1 500 m

World Championships
Gold medal – first place	1978 Belgrade	C-1 500 m
Silver medal – second place	1979 Duisburg	C-1 1000 m
Bronze medal – third place	1979 Duisburg	C-1 500 m
Bronze medal – third place	1981 Nottingham	C-2 500 m

Lyubomir Lyubenov (Bulgarian: Любомир Любенов, born 26 August 1957) is a Bulgarian sprint canoeist who competed in the late 1970s and early 1980s. At the 1980 Summer Olympics in Moscow, he won a gold in the C-1 1000 m event and a silver in the C-1 500 m event.

Born in Plovdiv, Lyubenov won four medals at the ICF Canoe Sprint World Championships with a gold (C-1 500: 1978), a silver (C-1 1000 m: 1979), and two bronzes (C-1 500 m: 1979, C-2 500 m: 1981).
