= Roland Iche =

French sprint canoer (born 1947)

Roland Iche (born 3 March 1947) is a French sprint canoeist who competed in the mid-1970s. At the 1976 Summer Olympics in Montreal, he finished sixth in the C-1 1000 m event and ninth in the C-1 500 m event.
