= Enrique Romero (swimmer) =

Spanish swimmer

Enrique Romero (born 30 December 1963) is a Spanish former breaststroke swimmer who competed in the 1984 Summer Olympics.
