= Angus Morrison (canoeist) =

American canoeist

Angus Gault Morrison (born March 11, 1952, in Minneapolis) is an American retired slalom and sprint canoeist who competed in the 1970s. He finished tenth in the C-1 slalom event at the 1972 Summer Olympics in Munich. Four years later in Montreal, Morrison was eliminated in the repechages of the C-1 500 m event at the semifinals of the C-1 1000 m events.
