= Pierre Langlois (canoeist) =

French sprint canoer (born 1958)

Pierre Langlois (French pronunciation: [pjɛʁ lɑ̃ɡlwa]; born 2 February 1958) is a French sprint canoeist who competed in the early 1980s. At the 1980 Summer Olympics in Moscow, he finished ninth in the C-2 500 m event while withdrawing prior to the heats of the C-1 1000 m event.
