= José Morillo =

Spanish water polo player

Personal information
- Nationality: Spanish
- Born: 28 May 1962 (age 64)

Sport
- Sport: Water polo

José Morillo (born 28 May 1962) is a Spanish water polo player. He competed in the men's tournament at the 1984 Summer Olympics.
