= Jorge Signes =

Spanish water polo player (born 1960)

Personal information
- Nationality: Spanish
- Born: 16 June 1960 (age 64)

Sport
- Sport: Water polo

Jorge Signes (born 16 June 1960) is a Spanish water polo player. He competed in the men's tournament at the 1984 Summer Olympics.
