= Jukka Hakala =

Finnish footballer (born 1977)

Personal information
- Full name: Jukka Sakari Hakala
- Date of birth: 7 November 1977 (age 48)
- Place of birth: Kokkola, Finland
- Height: 1.87 m (6 ft 1 1/2 in)
- Position: Defender

Senior career*
Years	Team	Apps	(Gls)
1996–1998	KPV	52	(15)
1998–2002	Silkeborg	8	(0)
2003	Start	18	(0)
2004	Sogndal	4	(0)
2005	TP-47	25	(2)
2006–2009	Notodden	55	(1)
2010	KPV	18	(2)
- * Club domestic league appearances and goals

Jukka Hakala (born 7 November 1977) is a Finnish former footballer who played as defender.

After several years away from Kokkola, at the age of 32, Hakala signed one-year deal with KPV in April 2010.

Later he has worked as an assistant coach for KPV.

== Career statistics ==
As of 1 September 2024.

Appearances and goals by club, season and competition
Club	Season	League			Cup (Note: Includes Norwegian Cup and Suomen Cup)		Europe		Total	
Club	Season	Division	Apps	Goals	Apps	Goals	Apps	Goals	Apps	Goals
KPV	1996	Kakkonen								
KPV	1997	Kakkonen								
KPV	1998	Ykkönen								
KPV	Total		52	15	0	0	0	0	52	15
Silkeborg	1998–99	Danish Superliga	1	0	0	0	–		1	0
Silkeborg	1999–00	Danish Superliga	0	0	0	0	–		0	0
Silkeborg	2000–01	Danish Superliga	0	0	0	0	–		0	0
Silkeborg	2001–02	Danish Superliga	7	0	0	0	1 (Note: Appearance(s) in UEFA Cup)	0	8	0
Silkeborg	Total		8	0	0	0	1	0	9	0
Start	2002	Tippeligaen	14	0	0	0	–		14	0
Start	2003	1. divisjon	4	0	0	0	–		4	0
Start	Total		18	0	0	0	0	0	18	0
Sogndal	2004	Tippeligaen	4	0	1	0	–		5	0
TP-47	2005	Veikkausliiga	25	2	0	0	-		25	2
Notodden	2007	1. divisjon	20	0	0	0	–		20	0
Notodden	2008	1. divisjon	19	0	0	0	–		19	0
Notodden	2009	1. divisjon	16	1	0	0	–		16	1
Notodden	Total		55	1	0	0	0	0	55	1
KPV	2010	Ykkönen	18	2	1	0	–		19	2
Career total			180	20	2	0	1	0	183	20
