= Juan Enrique Escalas =

Spanish swimmer

Personal information
- Born: 25 March 1964 (age 62) Palma de Mallorca, Spain

Sport
- Sport: Swimming

Juan Enrique Escalas (born 25 March 1964, in Palma de Mallorca) is a former Spanish freestyle swimmer who competed in the 1984 Summer Olympics. He is the son of Rafael Escalas Oliver and Catalina Bestard Planisi and brother of Olympic swimmer Rafael Escalas.
