= Franck Lambert =

French canoeist

Franck Lambert (born September 10, 1960) is a French sprint canoer who competed in the early 1980s. At the 1980 Summer Olympics in Moscow, he finished ninth in the C-2 500 m event while withdrawing prior to the heats of the C-1 500 m event.
