= Nikolai Ilkov =

Bulgarian canoeist

Olympic medal record

Men's canoe sprint
Bronze medal – third place	1980 Moscow	C-2 500 m

Nikolai Ilkov (Bulgarian: Николай Илков) (born 21 February 1955) is a Bulgarian sprint canoeist who competed in the late 1970s and early 1980s. He won a bronze medal in the C-2 500 m event at the 1980 Summer Olympics in Moscow.
