= Aleksandr Rogov =

Soviet canoeist

Medal record

Men's canoe sprint

Olympic Games
Gold medal – first place	1976 Montréal	C-1 500 m

Aleksandr Rogov (March 27, 1956 – October 1, 2004) was a Soviet sprint canoer who competed in the mid-1970s. At the 1976 Summer Olympics in Montreal, he won the gold in the C-1 500 m event.

Rogov was born in Moscow.
