= Francisco López (canoeist) =

Spanish canoeist

Francisco López (born 12 February 1965) is a Spanish sprint canoeist who competed from the mid-1980s to the early 1990s. Competing in three Summer Olympics, he earned his best finish of ninth in both the C-1 500 m and C-1 1000 m events at Los Angeles in 1984.
