= Eric Jamieson =

British canoeist (born 1960)

Medal record

Men's canoe slalom

Representing Great Britain

World Championships
Gold medal – first place	1981 Bala	C-2 team
Bronze medal – third place	1983 Meran	C-2 team

Eric Jamieson (born 11 August 1960) is a former British sprint canoeist and slalom canoeist who competed in the 1980s and the 1990s.

== Early life ==
He came from Surrey. He was a construction manager in 1992.

== Career ==
Competing in three Summer Olympics, he earned his best finish of seventh in the C-2 500 m event at Los Angeles in 1984.

He also won two medals in the C-2 team event at the ICF Canoe Slalom World Championships with a gold in 1981 and a bronze in 1983.
