= Mirko Nišović =

Former Serbian Canoe racer

Medal record

Men's canoe sprint

Representing Yugoslavia

Olympic Games
Gold medal – first place	1984 Los Angeles	C-2 500 m
Silver medal – second place	1984 Los Angeles	C-2 1000 m

World Championships
Gold medal – first place	1982 Belgrade	C-2 500 m
Gold medal – first place	1983 Tampere	C-2 500 m
Gold medal – first place	1985 Mechelen	C-2 10000 m
Silver medal – second place	1982 Belgrade	C-2 1000 m
Silver medal – second place	1985 Mechelen	C-2 1000 m
Bronze medal – third place	1983 Tampere	C-2 1000 m

Mediterranean Games
Gold medal – first place	1979 Split	C-2 500 m

Mirko Nišović (Serbian Cyrillic: Мирко Нишовић; born July 2, 1961) is a Serbian retired sprint canoeist who competed from the late 1970s to the late 1980s. Competing in three Summer Olympics, he won two medals at Los Angeles in 1984 with a gold in the C-2 500 m and a silver in the C-2 1000 m events, in team with Matija Ljubek.

Nišović also won six medals at the ICF Canoe Sprint World Championships with three golds (C-2 500 m: 1982, 1983; C-2 10000 m: 1985), two silvers (C-2 1000 m: 1982, 1985), and one bronze (C-2 1000 m: 1983).
