= Jan Pinczura =

Polish canoeist

Jan Pinczura (born 20 October 1960 in Balin) is a Polish sprint canoeist who competed in the 1980s. Competing in two Summer Olympics, he earned his best finish of fifth in the C-1 500 m event in Seoul in 1988.
