= Ivan Šabjan =

Yugoslav-born Croatian sprint canoer

Personal information
- Born: 21 November 1961 (age 64) Korođ, Yugoslavia

Sport
- Sport: Canoe sprint
Medal record
Representing Yugoslavia
World Championships
Gold medal – first place	1987 Duisburg	C-1 10000 m
Silver medal – second place	1986 Montreal	C-1 10000 m
Bronze medal – third place	1986 Montreal	C-1 1000 m
Summer Universiade
Bronze medal – third place	1987 Zagreb	C-1 1000 m
Representing Croatia
Mediterranean Games
Bronze medal – third place	1993 Languedoc	C-2 500m

Ivan Šabjan (born 21 November 1961) is a Yugoslav-born Croatian sprint canoer who competed from 1986 to 1996. He won a complete set of medals at the ICF Canoe Sprint World Championships with a gold in 1987 (C-1 10000 m), a silver in 1986 (C-1 10000 m), and a bronze in 1986 (C-1 1000 m).

Šabjan also competed in two Summer Olympics, earning his best finish of eighth twice, both in the C-1 1000 m event (1988 for Yugoslavia, 1996 for Croatia).
