= Bruce Merritt =

American canoeist (born 1958)

Personal information
- Full name: Bruce Perry Merritt
- Born: April 1, 1958 (age 68) Arlington, Virginia, U.S.
- Height: 1.75 m (5 ft 9 in)
- Weight: 75 kg (165 lb)
Medal record
Men's canoe sprint
Representing the United States
Pan American Games
Gold medal – first place	1987 Indianapolis	C-1 1000m
Bronze medal – third place	1987 Indianapolis	C-2 500m

Bruce Perry Merritt (born April 1, 1958) is an American sprint canoeist who competed as a member of the US National Team from 1978 to 1988. Competing in two Summer Olympics, 1984 and 1988, he earned his best Olympic finish of seventh in the C-1 1000 m event at Los Angeles in 1984.
