= Kiyoto Inoue =

Japanese canoeist

Personal information
- Born: December 10, 1957 (age 68) Kumamoto, Japan
- Height: 176 cm (5 ft 9 in)
- Weight: 67 kg (148 lb)
Medal record
Men's canoe sprint
Representing Japan
Asian Games
Silver medal – second place	1990 Beijing	C-1 500 m

Kiyoto Inoue (井上 清登, Inoue Kiyoto; born December 10, 1957) is a Japanese sprint canoer who competed in the mid to late 1980s. Competing in two Summer Olympics, he earned his best finish of sixth in the C-1 500 m event at Los Angeles in 1984.
