= Borislav Ananiev =

Bulgarian sprint canoer

Medal record

Men's canoe sprint

Olympic Games
Bronze medal – third place	1980 Moscow	C-2 500 m

World Championships
Bronze medal – third place	1975 Belgrade	C-1 500 m

Borislav Ananiev (Bulgarian: Борислав Ананиев) (born December 11, 1955) is a Bulgarian sprint canoer who competed from the mid-1970s to the early 1980s. Competing in two Summer Olympics, he won a bronze medal in the C-2 500 m event at Moscow in 1980.

Ananiev also won a bronze medal in the C-1 500 m event at the 1975 ICF Canoe Sprint World Championships in Belgrade.
