= Enrique Míguez =

Spanish canoeist (born 1966)

Olympic medal record

Men's canoe sprint
Bronze medal – third place	1984 Los Angeles	C-2 500 m

Enrique Míguez (born 4 March 1966) is a Spanish sprint canoer who competed from the mid-1980s to the early 1990s. Competing in three Summer Olympics, he won a bronze medal in the C-2 500 m event at Los Angeles in 1984.
