= Félix Fernández (water polo) =

Spanish water polo player (born 1964)

Personal information
- Full name: Félix Fernández Salcines
- Nationality: Spanish
- Born: 23 May 1961 (age 63)

Sport
- Sport: Water polo

Félix Fernández Salcines (Note: In this Spanish name, the first or paternal surname is Fernández and the second or maternal family name is Salcines.) (born 23 May 1964) is a Spanish water polo player. He competed in the men's tournament at the 1984 Summer Olympics.
