= Ulrich Eicke =

German canoeist

Medal record

Men's canoe sprint

Olympic Games
Gold medal – first place	1984 Los Angeles	C-1 1000 m

World Championships
Silver medal – second place	1977 Sofia	C-1 500 m
Silver medal – second place	1979 Duisburg	C-1 500 m
Silver medal – second place	1985 Mechelen	C-1 1000 m

Ulrich Eicke (born 18 February 1952 in Wuppertal) is a West German sprint canoeist who competed from the mid-1970s to the mid-1980s. Competing in two Summer Olympics, he won the gold in the C-1 1000 m event at Los Angeles in 1984.

Eicke also earned three silver medals at the ICF Canoe Sprint World Championships (C-1 500 m: 1977, 1979; C-1 1000 m: 1985).
