= Rafael Escalas =

Spanish swimmer (born 1961)

Rafael Bestard
Personal information
- Full name: Rafael Escalas Bestard
- National team: Spain
- Born: February 24, 1961 (age 65) Palma de Mallorca, Spain
- Height: 1.78 m (5 ft 10 in)
- Weight: 72 kg (159 lb)

Sport
- Sport: Swimming
- Strokes: Freestyle
- Club: Club Natación Palma
- College team: University of California, Los Angeles
Medal record
Men's swimming
Representing Spain
European Championships (LC)
Bronze medal – third place	1981 Split	1500 m freestyle
Mediterranean Games
Gold medal – first place	1983 Casablanca	1500 m freestyle

Rafael Escalas Bestard (Note: In this Spanish name, the first or paternal surname is Escalas and the second or maternal family name is Bestard.) (born February 24, 1961) is a Spanish former competitive swimmer. Escalas competed in the 1980 and 1984 Olympics. He also swam competitively in the United States for the University of California, Los Angeles (UCLA).

== Swimming career ==
Escalas received an athletic scholarship to attend UCLA, where he competed for coach Ron Ballatore's UCLA Bruins swimming and diving team in National Collegiate Athletic Association (NCAA) competition. In 1981, he set the NCAA record in the men's 1,650-yard freestyle (time: 14:53.90). scalas is the only swimmer to win an NCAA championship after being seeded last. He was also a member of the UCLA's NCAA national championship team in 1982.

Escalas competed in two Olympic Games: 1980 in Moscow, where he placed 6th in the 1500-meter freestyle event, and 1984 in Los Angeles, where he placed 11th in the 1500-meter freestyle. Escalas was also part of Spain's 4x200-meter freestyle relay in Los Angeles. In terms of world rankings, Escalas was ranked third in the world in the 1,500-meter freestyle in 1981, with a time of 15:17.93, which was a Spanish national record for over 19 years.

== Post swimming career ==
In recent Summer Olympics, Escalas served as Technical Director of the Swimming Competition (Barcelona 1992) and Competition Manager of Swimming (Atlanta 1996). A sports center in Palma de Mallorca is named after Rafa and his brother, Juan Enrique: Germans Escalas. Rafa is currently President and CEO of competitive swimwear manufacturer AgonSwim.

Experience as an athlete and as a swimwear manufacturer lead Escalas to be the athlete's representative on the FINA Scientific Commission for Suits (he has since stepped down from the committee). The commission was established to maintain the standards of swimwear and limit the impact that advanced technology might have on performance.

== Personal life ==
Rafa is married to Jennifer Edson Escalas, a professor at Vanderbilt University, and has two daughters: Elena Escalas, who also swims at UCLA, and Marina Escalas.
