= Hiroyuki Izumi =

Japanese canoeist

Personal information
- Born: August 26, 1965 (age 61)
- Height: 170 cm (5 ft 7 in)
- Weight: 70 kg (154 lb)
Medal record
Men's canoe sprint
Representing Japan
Asian Games
Bronze medal – third place	1990 Beijing	C-2 500 m

Hiroyuki Izumi (和泉 博幸, Izumi Hiroyuki; born August 26, 1965) is a Japanese sprint canoer who competed in the mid to late 1980s. Competing in two Summer Olympics, he earned his best finish of eighth in the C-2 500 m event at Los Angeles in 1984.
