= Steve Botting =

Canadian sprint canoer

Steve Botting (born December 5, 1959, in Montreal) is a Canadian sprint canoer who competed in the mid-1980s. At the 1984 Summer Olympics in Los Angeles, he finished fifth in the C-2 1000 m event and seventh in the C-2 1000 m
