= Larry Cain =

Canadian canoeist (born 1963)

Personal information
- Full name: Laurence J. Cain
- Born: January 9, 1963 (age 63) Toronto, Ontario, Canada
- Home town: Oakville, Ontario, Canada

Sport
- Country: Canada
- Sport: Canoe racing
- Event(s): C-1 500 m, C-1 1000 m
- Club: Burloak Canoe Club
Medal record
Men's canoe sprint
Representing Canada
Olympic Games
Gold medal – first place	1984 Los Angeles	C-1 500 m
Silver medal – second place	1984 Los Angeles	C-1 1000 m
World Championships
Silver medal – second place	1989 Plovdiv	C-1 1000 m

Laurence J. Cain, CM (born January 9, 1963) is a Canadian sprint canoeist. He was the first Canadian canoeist since Frank Amyot to win an Olympic gold medal in canoeing.

== Early life ==
Cain was born in Toronto, Ontario. He attended Oakville Trafalgar High School.

== Career ==
Cain began his career in 1974 at the Oakville Racing Canoe Club, now the Burloak Canoe Club, in Oakville, Ontario.

Cain competed in three Summer Olympics, winning a gold medal in the C-1 500 m, and a silver medal in the C1 1000 m events. He also won a silver medal in the C-1 1000 m event at the 1989 ICF Canoe Sprint World Championships in Plovdiv.

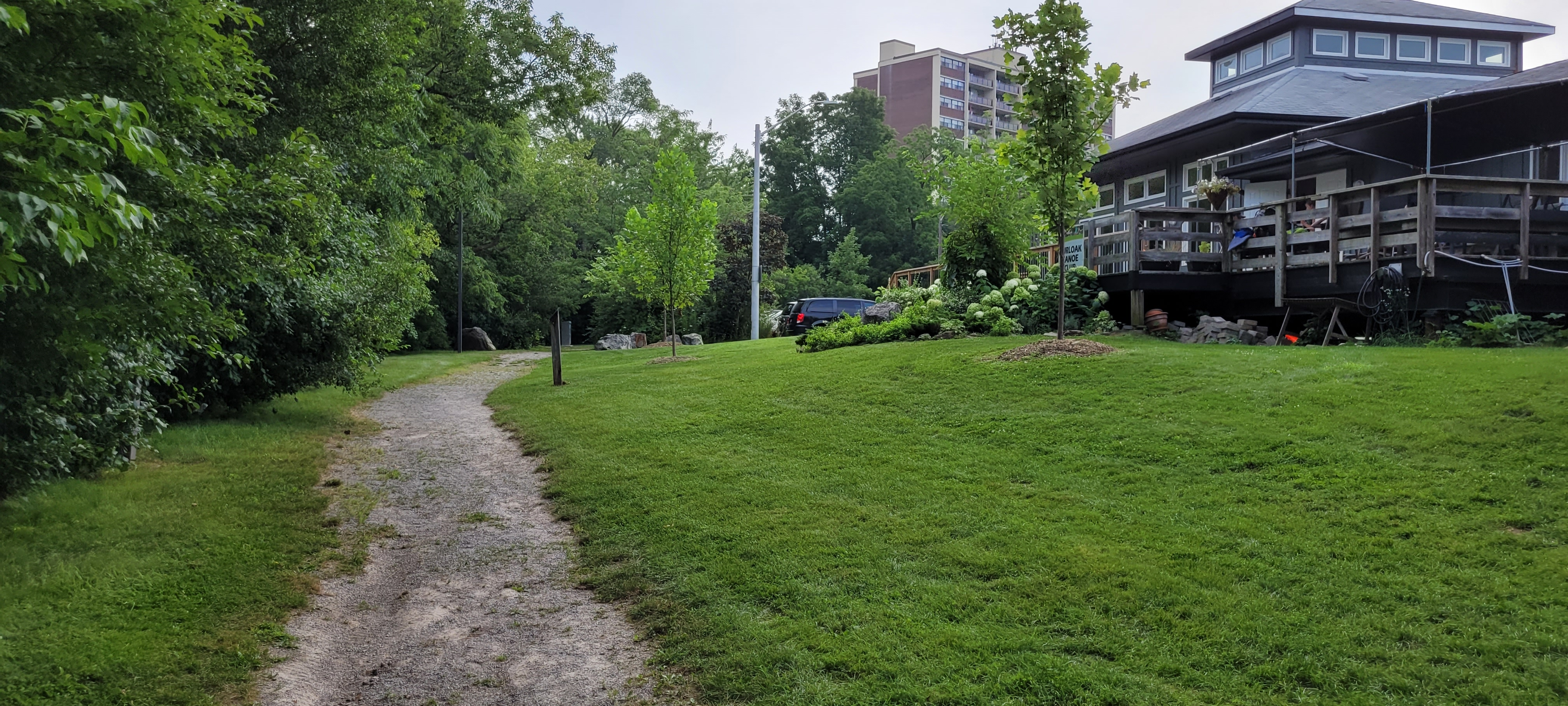
The Larry Cain trail outside the Burloak Canoe Club

In 1984, he was made a Member of the Order of Canada. In 1997, he was inducted into Canada's Sports Hall of Fame. A trail in Oakville has been named in his honour running along the town's waterfront where Cain trained.

Cain taught Physical Education at St. Mildred's-Lightbourn School until 2014. He then worked as a coach, preparing paddlers for the Olympic Games in Rio.

In 2016 Cain founded an online paddle-training company called Paddle Monster for standup paddleboarding. Cain also coached High Performance Canoeing at Burloak Canoe Club.
