= Narciso Suárez =

Spanish canoeist

Olympic medal record

Men's canoe sprint
Bronze medal – third place	1984 Los Angeles	C-2 500 m

Narcisco Suárez Amador (born 18 July 1960 in Valladolid) is a Spanish sprint canoeist who competed from the early 1980s to the early 1990s. Competing in four Summer Olympics, he won a bronze medal in the C-2 500 m event at Los Angeles in 1984.
