= Timo Grönlund =

Finnish canoeist (1954–2022)

Timo Tapio Grönlund (6 January 1954 – 27 December 2022) was a Finnish sprint canoer who competed from the mid-1970s to the late 1980s. Competing in four Summer Olympics, he earned his best finish of fourth in the C-1 1000 m event at Los Angeles in 1984.
