= Canoeing at the 1980 Summer Olympics – Men's K-1 500 metres =

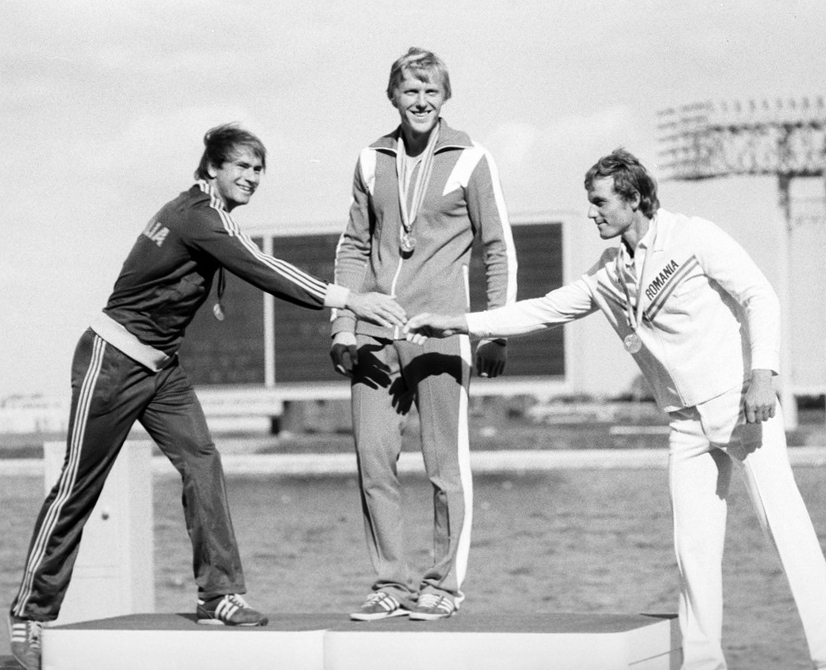
Left-right: John Sumegi, Vladimir Parfenovich and Vasile Dîba

The men's K-1 500 metres event was an individual kayaking event conducted as part of the Canoeing at the 1980 Summer Olympics program.

== Medalists ==
Gold	Silver	Bronze
Vladimir Parfenovich (URS)	John Sumegi (AUS)	Vasile Dîba (ROU)

== Results ==
=== Heats ===
The 21 competitors first raced in three heats on July 30. The top three finishers from each of the heats advanced directly to the semifinals. Four competitors did not start. The rest competed in the repechages.

Heat 1
1.	Frank-Peter Bischof (GDR)	1:46.13	QS
2.	Milan Janić (YUG)	1:46.62	QS
3.	Patrick Lefoulon (FRA)	1:47.10	QS
4.	Jorge Colome (CUB)	1:49.63	QR
5.	Declan Burns (IRL)	1:50.08	QR
6.	Grayson Bourne (GBR)	1:51.80	QR
7.	Helmut Lehmann (SUI)	1:52.02	QR
Heat 2
1.	Vladimir Parfenovich (URS)	1:44.80	QS
2.	Anders Andersson (SWE)	1:46.46	QS
3.	Grzegorz Śledziewski (POL)	1:47.17	QS
4.	Felix Masár (TCH)	1:47.33	QR
-	Wolfgang Hartl (AUT)	Did not start
-	Oreste Perri (ITA)	Did not start
-	Herminio Menéndez (ESP)	Did not start
Heat 3
1.	John Sumegi (AUS)	1:44.45	QS
2.	Vasile Dîba (ROU)	1:45.45	QS
3.	Ian Ferguson (NZL)	1:46.02	QS
4.	Zoltán Sztanity (HUN)	1:46.36	QR
5.	Jan Baaijens (NED)	1:49.21	QR
6.	Theo Claessens (BEL)	1:51.61	QR
-	Ivan Manev (BUL)	Did not start

=== Repechages ===
Taking place on July 30, the top three finishers from each repechage advanced to the semifinals.

Repechage 1
1.	Grayson Bourne (GBR)	1:47.39	QS
2.	Jan Baaijens (NED)	1:47.79	QS
3.	Theo Claessens (BEL)	1:48.13	QS
4.	Jorge Colome (CUB)	1:48.48
Repechage 2
1.	Zoltán Sztanity (HUN)	1:48.06	QS
2.	Felix Masár (TCH)	1:48.61	QS
3.	Helmut Lehmann (SUI)	1:49.94	QS
4.	Declan Burns (IRL)	1:53.65

=== Semifinals ===
The top three finishers in each of the three semifinals (raced on August 1) advanced to the final.

Semifinal 1
1.	Frank-Peter Bischof (GDR)	1:46.21	QF
2.	Ian Ferguson (NZL)	1:46.87	QF
3.	Anders Andersson (SWE)	1:46.93	QF
4.	Grayson Bourne (GBR)	1:48.34
5.	Helmut Lehmann (SUI)	1:51.60
Semifinal 2
1.	Vladimir Parfenovich (URS)	1:43.24	QF
2.	Vasile Dîba (ROU)	1:45.71	QF
3.	Zoltán Sztanity (HUN)	1:46.41	QF
4.	Patrick Lefoulon (FRA)	1:47.12
5.	Theo Claessens (BEL)	1:49.72
Semifinal 3
1.	John Sumegi (AUS)	1:46.11	QF
2.	Milan Janić (YUG)	1:46.92	QF
3.	Felix Masár (TCH)	1:47.11	QF
4.	Grzegorz Śledziewski (POL)	1:47.31
5.	Jan Baaijens (NED)	1:48.61

=== Final ===
The final was held on August 1.

Gold	Vladimir Parfenovich (URS)	1:43.43
Silver	John Sumegi (AUS)	1:44.12
Bronze	Vasile Dîba (ROU)	1:44.90
4.	Milan Janić (YUG)	1:45.63
5.	Frank-Peter Bischof (GDR)	1:45.97
6.	Anders Andersson (SWE)	1:46.32
7.	Ian Ferguson (NZL)	1:47.36
8.	Felix Masár (TCH)	1:48.18
9.	Zoltán Sztanity (HUN)	1:48.32
