= Colomé (disambiguation) =

Colomé or Colome may refer to:

== People ==
- Abelardo Colomé Ibarra (born 1939), Vice President of the Council of State of Cuba
- Álex Colomé (born 1988), Dominican professional baseball pitcher
- Ana María López Colomé, Mexican biochemist
- Antoñita Colomé (1912-2005), Spanish film actress
- Jaime Colomé (born 1979), Cuban retired footballer
- Jesús Colomé (born 1977), former professional relief pitcher
- Jorge Colome (born 1958), Cuban sprint canoer
- Omar Félix Colomé (1932-2015), Argentine Roman Catholic bishop
- Pura López Colomé (born 1952), Mexican poet, translator
- Yoel Colomé (born 1982), Cuban football defender

== Places ==
- Colomé, village and rural municipality in Salta Province in northwestern Argentina
- Colome, South Dakota, city in Tripp County, South Dakota, United States
- Sainte-Colome, commune in the Pyrénées-Atlantiques department in south-western France
