= Canoeing at the 1984 Summer Olympics – Men's K-2 1000 metres =

The men's K-2 1000 metres event was a pairs kayaking event conducted as part of the Canoeing at the 1984 Summer Olympics program.

== Medalists ==
Gold	Silver	Bronze
Hugh Fisher and Alwyn Morris (CAN)	Bernard Brégeon and Patrick Lefoulon (FRA)	Barry Kelly and Grant Kenny (AUS)

== Results ==
=== Heats ===
17 crews entered in three heats on August 7. The top three finishers from each of the heats advanced directly to the semifinals. The remaining eight teams were relegated to the repechage heats.

Heat 1
1.	Hugh Fisher and Alwyn Morris (CAN)	3:29.21	QS
2.	Terry Kent and Terry White (USA)	3:30.87	QS
3.	Werner Bachmeyer and Wolfgang Hartl (AUT)	3:31.58	QS
4.	Bernard Brégeon and Patrick Lefoulon (FRA)	3:31.60	QR
5.	Harald Amundsen and Einar Rasmussen (NOR)	3:44.60	QR
6.	Chu Zhengyong and Peng Bo (CHN)	3:52.98	QR
Heat 2
1.	Matthias Seack and Oliver Seack (FRG)	3:28.30	QS
2.	Barry Kelly and Grant Kenny (AUS)	3:28.73	QS
3.	Daniele Scarpa and Francesco Uberti (ITA)	3:28.82	QS
4.	Herminio Menéndez and Guillermo del Riego (ESP)	3:30.93	QR
5.	Alexandru Dulǎu and Ion Geantă (ROU)	3:35.25	QR
6.	Kazumori Koike and Hisao Yanagisawa (JPN)	3:49.63	QR
Heat 3
1.	Bengt Andersson and Kalle Sundqvist (SWE)	3:31.72	QS
2.	Gert Jan Lebbink and Ron Stevens (NED)	3:34.04	QS
3.	Christopher Canham and Jan Raciborski (GBR)	3:35.93	QS
4.	Robert Jenkinson and Edwin Richards (NZL)	3:37.69	QR
5.	Patrick De Bucke and Patrick Hanssens (BEL)	3:37.92	QR

=== Repechages ===
Taking place on August 7, the top three competitors in each of the two repechages advanced to the semifinals.

Repechage 1
1.	Bernard Brégeon and Patrick Lefoulon (FRA)	3:40.88	QS
2.	Alexandru Dulǎu and Ion Geantă (ROU)	3:41.03	QS
3.	Patrick De Bucke and Patrick Hanssens (BEL)	3:52.20	QS
4.	Chu Zhengyong and Peng Bo (CHN)	3:53.22
Repechage 2
1.	Herminio Menéndez and Guillermo del Riego (ESP)	3:41.20	QS
2.	Harald Amundsen and Einar Rasmussen (NOR)	3:43.61	QS
3.	Robert Jenkinson and Edwin Richards (NZL)	3:45.97	QS
4.	Kazumori Koike and Hisao Yanagisawa (JPN)	4:00.02

=== Semifinals ===
The top three finishers in each of the three semifinals (raced on August 9) advanced to the final.

Semifinal 1
1.	Hugh Fisher and Alwyn Morris (CAN)	3:29.09	QF
2.	Barry Kelly and Grant Kenny (AUS)	3:30.24	QF
3.	Bernard Brégeon and Patrick Lefoulon (FRA)	3:32.25	QF
4.	Christopher Canham and Jan Raciborski (GBR)	3:35.77
5.	Robert Jenkinson and Edwin Richards (NZL)	3:38.80
Semifinal 2
1.	Herminio Menéndez and Guillermo del Riego (ESP)	3:29.98	QF
2.	Matthias Seack and Oliver Seack (FRG)	3:30.18	QF
3.	Patrick De Bucke and Patrick Hanssens (BEL)	3:31.00	QF
4.	Werner Bachmeyer and Wolfgang Hartl (AUT)	3:31.60
5.	Gert Jan Lebbink and Ron Stevens (NED)	3:36.36
Semifinal 3
1.	Daniele Scarpa and Francesco Uberti (ITA)	3:28.25	QF
2.	Bengt Andersson and Kalle Sundqvist (SWE)	3:29.80	QF
3.	Terry Kent and Terry White (USA)	3:29.81	QF
4.	Alexandru Dulǎu and Ion Geantă (ROU)	3:29.99
5.	Harald Amundsen and Einar Rasmussen (NOR)	3:34.77

=== Final ===
The final was held on August 11.

Gold	Hugh Fisher and Alwyn Morris (CAN)	3:24.22
Silver	Bernard Brégeon and Patrick Lefoulon (FRA)	3:25.97
Bronze	Barry Kelly and Grant Kenny (AUS)	3:26.80
4.	Terry Kent and Terry White (USA)	3:27.01
5.	Matthias Seack and Oliver Seack (FRG)	3:27.28
6.	Daniele Scarpa and Francesco Uberti (ITA)	3:27.46
7.	Herminio Menéndez and Guillermo del Riego (ESP)	3:27.53
8.	Bengt Andersson and Kalle Sundqvist (SWE)	3:29.39
9.	Patrick De Bucke and Patrick Hanssens (BEL)	3:32.92
