= Martin Ralph =

Martin Ralph may refer to:

- Martin Ralph (canoeist)
- Martin R. Ralph

== See also ==
- Ralph Martin (disambiguation)
