= Canoeing at the 1980 Summer Olympics – Men's K-1 1000 metres =

The men's K-1 1000 metres event was an individual kayaking event conducted as part of the Canoeing at the 1980 Summer Olympics program.

== Medalists ==
Gold	Silver	Bronze
Rüdiger Helm (GDR)	Alain Lebas (FRA)	Ion Bîrlădeanu (ROU)

== Results ==
=== Heats ===
The 21 competitors first raced in three heats on July 31 though one did not start. The top three finishers from each of the heats advanced directly to the semifinals. All remaining competitors competed in the repechages later that day.

Heat 1
1.	Rüdiger Helm (GDR)	3:45.20	QS
2.	Oreste Perri (ITA)	3:46.18	QS
3.	István Joós (HUN)	3:47.26	QS
4.	Guillermo del Riego (ESP)	3:49.41	QR
5.	Ian Pringle (IRL)	3:53.01	QR
6.	Ian Ferguson (NZL)	3:59.07	QR
7.	Jan Baaijens (NED)	4:15.85	QR
Heat 2
1.	Alain Lebas (FRA)	3:44.78	QS
2.	Ion Bîrlădeanu (ROU)	3:46.76	QS
3.	John Sumegi (AUS)	3:47.60	QS
4.	Rasmutis Višinskis (URS)	3:48.57	QR
5.	Theo Claessens (BEL)	3:51.56	QR
6.	Jorge Colome (CUB)	3:55.26	QR
7.	Hannu Kojo (FIN)	4:10.66	QR
Heat 3
1.	Milan Janić (YUG)	3:47.77	QS
2.	Anders Andersson (SWE)	3:48.16	QS
3.	Felix Masár (TCH)	3:48.49	QS
4.	Waldemar Merk (POL)	3:48.82	QR
5.	Helmut Lehmann (SUI)	3:53.35	QR
6.	Douglas Parnham (GBR)	3:54.58	QR
-	Ivan Manev (BUL)	Did not start

=== Repechages ===
Taking place on July 31, two repechages were held. The top three finishers in each repechage advanced to the semifinals.

Repechage 1
1.	Guillermo del Riego (ESP)	3:51.04	QS
2.	Helmut Lehmann (SUI)	3:52.10	QS
3.	Ian Ferguson (NZL)	3:54.46	QS
4.	Theo Claessens (BEL)	3:57.61
5.	Hannu Kojo (FIN)	3:58.98
6.	Douglas Parnham (GBR)	4:06.96
Repechage 2
1.	Rasmutis Višinskis (URS)	3:50.29	QS
2.	Jan Baaijens (NED)	3:52.13	QS
3.	Waldemar Merk (POL)	3:52.27	QS
4.	Jorge Colome (CUB)	3:53.19
5.	Ian Pringle (IRL)	3:53.96

=== Semifinals ===
Raced on August 2, the top three finishers from each of the three semifinals advanced to the final.

Semifinal 1
1.	Rüdiger Helm (GDR)	3:52.04	QF
2.	Felix Masár (TCH)	3:53.13	QF
3.	Ion Bîrlădeanu (ROU)	3:55.65	QF
4.	Guillermo del Riego (ESP)	3:57.47
5.	Waldemar Merk (POL)	3:58.35
Semifinal 2
1.	Anders Andersson (SWE)	3:52.80	QF
2.	Alain Lebas (FRA)	3:53.05	QF
3.	Ian Ferguson (NZL)	3:54.05	QF
4.	Rasmutis Višinskis (URS)	3:54.52
5.	István Joós (HUN)	4:01.67
Semifinal 3
1.	Milan Janić (YUG)	3:53.34	QF
2.	John Sumegi (AUS)	3:54.28	QF
3.	Oreste Perri (ITA)	3:54.67	QF
4.	Helmut Lehmann (SUI)	3:56.97
5.	Jan Baaijens (NED)	4:01.35

=== Final ===
The final took place on August 2.

Gold	Rüdiger Helm (GDR)	3:48.77
Silver	Alain Lebas (FRA)	3:50.20
Bronze	Ion Bîrlădeanu (ROU)	3:50.49
4.	John Sumegi (AUS)	3:50.63
5.	Oreste Perri (ITA)	3:51.95
6.	Felix Masár (TCH)	3:52.10
7.	Milan Janić (YUG)	3:53.50
8.	Ian Ferguson (NZL)	3:53.78
9.	Anders Andersson (SWE)	3:54.54
