= Lee Young-jin =

Lee Young-jin (Korean: 이영진) is a Korean name consisting of the family name Lee (이) and the given name Young-jin (영진). It may refer to:

- Lee Young-jin (footballer, born 1963), South Korea football manager and former player
- Lee Young-jin (footballer, born 1972), South Korea football coach and former player
- Lee Young-jin (actress) (born 1981), South Korean actress
- Young Jean Lee (born 1974), playwright

== See also ==
- Lee Yong-jin (born 1985), South Korean comedian and singer
