= Canham =

Canham may refer to:

== People ==
- Arthur Canham (1867–1933), South Africa's first trade commissioner
- Charles D. W. Canham (1901–1963), American military commander
- Christopher Canham (born 1962), British sprint canoer
- Don Canham (1918–2005), American athlete, coach, and college athletics administrator
- Erwin Canham (1904–1982), American journalist and author
- Leigh Canham (born 1958), British scientist
- Marc Canham (born 1982), British footballer
- Marc Canham (born 1977), British music composer
- Marsha Canham (born 1951), Canadian writer
- Mitch Canham (born 1984), American baseball coach and former catcher
- Scott Canham (born 1974), English footballer
- Sean Canham (born 1984), English footballer
- Timothy Canham, American software engineer, software lead and operations lead for Ingenuity helicopter
- Tony Canham (born 1960), English footballer

== Places ==
- Mount Canham
- Canham Glacier
