= Kang Kyŏngae =

Korean feminist writer (1906–1944)

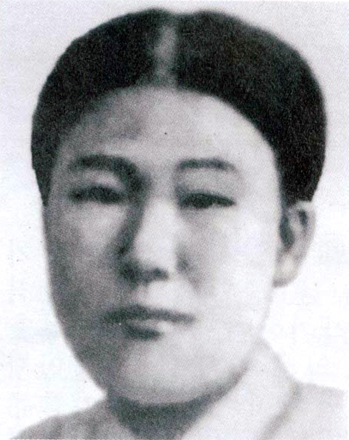
- Kang Kyŏngae
- Born: April 20, 1906; Songhwa County, Hwanghae Province, Korean Empire
- Died: April 26, 1944; Kōkai-dō, Korea, Empire of Japan
- Occupation: Novelist
- Writing career
- Period: 1906–1944

Korean name
- Hangul: 강경애
- Hanja: 姜敬愛
- RR: Gang Gyeongae
- MR: Kang Kyŏngae

Kang Kyŏngae (Korean: 강경애; 20 April 1906 – 26 April 1944) was a Korean writer, novelist and poet involved with the feminist movement. She is also known by her penname Kang Gama.

== Biography ==
Kang Kyŏngae was born in Songhwa County, Hwanghae Province, Korean Empire and had an unhappy childhood. She was the daughter of a servant and lost her father at the age of five. She was then forced to move to Changyeon where her mother remarried a man with three children. All of these circumstances resulted in substantial unhappiness.

Kang was something of a prodigy and started teaching herself to read the Korean alphabet when she was eight years old using her step-father's copy of the Tale of Ch’unhyang at a time when female literacy was not greatly valued. By age ten, she had been nicknamed the “little acorn storyteller” by neighborhood elders for whom she read traditional Korean tales. She was also praised in school for her essay writing and often read stories for her friends.

Kang enrolled in a Catholic boarding school with the help of her brother-in-law. She was later expelled for orchestrating and participating in a sit-in against the school's strict policies and a particularly cruel dorm mistress. She met a college student who was visiting from Tokyo, moved to Seoul with him, and began an affair. When the affair ended, she moved back to her family home in Hwanghae-do.

In 1931 Kang began publishing her writing ("P'ag ŭm" or Broken Zither, 1931), and moved to Manchuria as a newlywed, married to a communist who had divorced his first wife. She lived as a housewife in Yongjin and began to churn out literary works. This period lasted seven years after which Kang ceased writing fiction altogether. This was partly related to the fact that she became the managing editor of the Manchurian Chosun Ilbo.

On April 26, 1944, one month after her mother died, Kang Kyŏngae died at her home in Hwanghae Province.

== Work ==
Kang is often mentioned by literary critics as one of the foremost female writers of the colonial period. Different from other prominent female authors of the time, such as Na Hye-sok and Heo Jong-suk, she focused solely on fiction and essay writing and did not branch out into other forms of artistic expression such as painting. She produced works focusing on the Korean underclass often based on her experiences with extremely poor Koreans in Manchuria, where many of her works took place. These include: "The Broken Geomungo" (Pageum), "Vegetable Garden" (Chaejeon), "Football Game" (Chukgu jeon), and "Mother and Child" (Moja). She also wrote proto-feminist works focusing on women's oppression including "Mothers and Daughters" (Eomeoni wa ttal). Most of her works are anti-love/anti family, in which only those women who cut their ties with their failed relationships can achieve freedom.

From Wonso Pond (Ingan munje), which many consider her best work, is her only novel and deals with a multiplicity of class and gender issues.

=== Works in English ===
From Wŏnso Pond (Feminist Press 2009) ISBN 978-1-55861-601-1
The Underground Village (Honford Star 2018)

=== Works in Korean ===
The Broken Geomungo (Pageum 1931)
Mothers and Daughters (Eomeoni wa ttal 1931)
Comet (Hyeseong 1931)
The Front Line (Jaeilseon 1932)
Vegetable Garden (Chaejeon 1933)
Football Game (Chukgu jeon 1933)
Existence, Nonexistence (Yumu 有無 1933)
Fathers and Sons (Buja 1934)
The Human Problem (Ingan munje 1934)
Salt (Sogeum 1934)
Drugs/Magic Medicine (Mayak)
Mother and Child (Moja 1935)
Writer's Fee: 200 won (Wongoryo Ibaekwon 1935)
Layoff (Haego 1935)
Underground Village (Jihachon 1936)
Mountain Man (Sannam 1936)
Darkness (Eodum 1937)

== See also ==
- List of women writers
- List of Korean novelists
