= Matthias Seack =

Competitive canoeist from Germany

Medal record

Men's canoe sprint

World Championships
Bronze medal – third place	1982 Belgrade	K-2 500 m
Bronze medal – third place	1982 Belgrade	K-4 1000 m

Matthias Seack (born 28 July 1962) is a West German sprint canoeist who competed in the early to mid-1980s. He won two bronze medals at the ICF Canoe Sprint World Championships, earning them in the K-2 500 m (1982) and the K-4 1000 m (1982).

Seack also competed at the 1984 Summer Olympics in Los Angeles, finishing fifth in the K-2 1000 m and seventh in the K-2 500 m events with his twin brother Oliver Seack.
