= Bucke =

Bucke is a surname. Notable people with this surname include:

- Charles Bucke (1781–1846), English writer
- Patrick De Bucke (born 1957), Belgian sprint canoer
- Richard Maurice Bucke (1837–1902), Canadian psychiatrist

== See also ==
- Buck (surname)
