= David Halpern =

David Halpern may refer to:

- David Halpern (canoeist)
- David Halpern (psychologist)
