= Classens =

Classens is a surname. Notable people with the surname include:

- Gustav Classens (1894–1977), German conductor
- Theo Classens (born 1948), Belgian canoe sprinter

== See also ==
- Classen, surname
