= Oshin Derieuw =

Belgian boxer (born 1987)

Personal information
- Born: 29 April 1987 (age 39) Roeselare, Belgium
- Weight: Welterweight

Boxing career
- Stance: Orthodox

Boxing record
- Total fights: 20
- Wins: 20
- Win by KO: 7
- Losses: 0
- Draws: 0
Medal record
Women's amateur boxing
Representing Belgium
European Games
Silver medal – second place	2023 Kraków-Małopolska	Welterweight

Oshin Derieuw (born 29 April 1987) is a Belgian professional boxer, with a professional boxing record of 19 wins and no losses, and who was a WBF Women's World Light Welterweight champion. Late in her career, she made the switch to amateur boxing and qualified as first ever Belgian women boxer for the 2024 Summer Olympics in Paris, France by winning a silver medal at the 2023 European Games. At the Olympics, she reached the quarter-finals where she lost to the Chinese boxer Yang Liu. In September 2025, at the 2025 World Boxing Championships in Liverpool, England, Derieuw became he first ever women boxer from Belgium to win a bout at a World Boxing Championships by beating Algerian boxer Ichrak Chaib in the first round.

== Personal life ==
Oshin Derieuw's parents named her after a character in a Japanese soap series, hence the decidedly non-Belgian sounding first name. She grew up in Roeselare, Belgium, is the sister of Chilo "Chillow" Derieuw, a singer, music producer, and dj, and is married to the triathlete Charlotte Deldaele, the daughter of Belgian Olympic kayaking athletes Inge Coeck and Geert Deldaele.
