= Koike =

Koike (written: 小池) is a Japanese surname. Notable people with the surname include:

- Akihiko Koike, a retired Japanese male race walker
- Akiko Koike, a Japanese voice actress
- Akira Koike, a Japanese politician
- Asao Koike (小池 朝雄; 1931–1985), Japanese actor
- Ayame Koike, a Japanese actress
- Eiko Koike, a Japanese idol and actress
- Junki Koike, a Japanese football player
- Kazuko Koike, a Japanese creative director
- Kazumori Koike, a Japanese sprint canoer
- Kazuo Koike, a Japanese manga writer, novelist, and entrepreneur
- Kensuke Koike, a Japanese contemporary visual artist
- Mariko Koike (小池 真理子; born 1952), Japanese writer
- Masaaki Koike, a Japanese baseball player
- Masakatsu Koike, a Japanese politician
- Reizo Koike, a Japanese breaststroke swimmer
- Rina Koike, a Japanese idol and actress
- Satomi Koike (小池 里美; born 1950), Japanese speed skater
- Shiori Koike (小池 詩織; born 1993), Japanese ice hockey player
- Shota Koike, a Japanese baseball catcher
- Takeshi Koike, a Japanese studio animator, illustrator, and film director
- Teppei Koike, a Japanese actor and singer
- Toshiki Koike, a Japanese football player
- Yui Koike, a Japanese gravure idol and actress
- Yuki Koike (athlete), a Japanese sprinter
- Yuriko Koike, a Japanese politician

== Fictional characters ==
- Koike (小池), a ramen chief character from Little Ghost Q-Taro and Doraemon

== Other uses ==
- Koikeya, a Japanese snack food company
