= Savilahti =

Surname list

Savilahti is a Finnish surname. Notable people with the surname include:

- Eero Savilahti (born 1992), Finnish ice hockey player
- Mika Savilahti (born 1963), Finnish sprint canoer
- Per Savilahti-Nagander, Finnish ice hockey player

In addition, Savilahti may refer to a medieval parish in Finland, see Mikkelin maalaiskunta.

== See also ==
- Savilahti Stone Sacristy, Finland
