= Yanagisawa =

Yanagisawa (written: 柳沢 or 柳澤) is a Japanese surname. Notable people with the name include:

- Atsushi Yanagisawa (born 1977), Japanese footballer
- Hakuo Yanagisawa (born 1935), a Japanese politician
- Hisao Yanagisawa (柳沢 尚久; born 1957), Japanese sprint canoeist
- Ko Yanagisawa (柳澤 亘; born 1996), Japanese footballer
- Kimio Yanagisawa (born 1948), a Japanese manga artist
- Riku Yanagisawa (born 2001), Japanese Curler
- Ryūshi Yanagisawa (born 1972), a Japanese professional wrestler, mixed martial artist, and kickboxer
- Yanagisawa Yoshiyasu (1658–1714), a Japanese samurai
- Satoshi Yanagisawa (born 1971), Japanese racewalker

== Fictional characters ==
- Naoko Yanagisawa, a character in the manga series Cardcaptor Sakura
- Mitsuo Yanagisawa, a character in the light novel series Golden Time

== See also ==
- Yanagisawa Wind Instruments
