= Edwin Richards =

Edwin Richards may refer to:

- Edwin Richards (field hockey) (1879–1930), Welsh field hockey player
- Edwin Richards (canoeist) (born 1957), New Zealand sprint canoer
- Edwin Richards (politician) (1856–1927), Australian politician
- Ed Richards (fencer) (1929–2012), American fencer
