= Raciborski =

Raciborski may refer to:

- Racibórz County in Poland
- Jan Raciborski, canoer
