= Yongjin =

Yongjin can refer to:

- Shen Yongjin (Chinese: 沈勇进; born 1960), Chinese sprint canoeist
- Yongjin Expressway, expressway in Zhejiang province, China
- Yong-jin (Korean: 용진), Korean given name
- Zheng Yongjin (Chinese: 鄭永金), Taiwanese politician
