= Dimofte =

Dimofte is a Romanian surname. Notable people with the surname include:

- Ionuț Dimofte (born 1984), Romanian rugby union footballer
- Petrica Dimofte (fl. 1980s), Romanian sprint canoeist
