= Chu Zhengyong =

Chinese sprint canoer

Personal information
- Native name: 褚正勇
- Nationality: Chinese
- Born: 28 December 1961 (age 64) Qianyuan town, Deqing
- Education: the First Middle School of Deqing, Zhejiang
- Height: 1.89 m (6 ft 2 in)
- Weight: 80 kg (180 lb)

Sport
- Country: China
- Sport: Canoe sprint
- Retired: yes

Chu Zhengyong
- Traditional Chinese: 褚正勇
- Simplified Chinese: 褚正勇
Transcriptions
Standard Mandarin
- Hanyu Pinyin: Chǔ Zhèng Yǒng

Chu Zhengyong (Chinese: 褚正勇; born December 28, 1961, in Fuqing, Zhejiang) is a Chinese sprint canoer who competed in the mid-1980s. At the 1984 Summer Olympics in Los Angeles, he was eliminated in the repechages of the K-2 1000 m event.
