= Francisco Leal (canoeist) =

Spanish canoeist (born 1968)

Francisco Leal (born August 26, 1968) is a Spanish sprint canoer who competed in the late 1980s. At the 1988 Summer Olympics in Seoul, he was eliminated in the semifinals of the K-1 500 m event.
