= Hugh Fisher (canoeist) =

Canadian sprint kayaker

Personal information
- Born: October 1, 1955 (age 71) Hamilton, New Zealand

Sport
- Country: Canada
- Sport: canoe sprint
Medal record
Men's canoe sprint
Representing Canada
Olympic Games
Gold medal – first place	1984 Los Angeles	K-2 1000 m
Bronze medal – third place	1984 Los Angeles	K-2 500 m
World Championships
Silver medal – second place	1982 Belgrade	K-2 1000 m
Bronze medal – third place	1983 Tampere	K-2 500 m

Hugh Fisher, CM (born October 1, 1955) is a New Zealand-born Canadian sprint kayaker who competed from the mid-1970s to the late 1980s. He participated in three Summer Olympics: in 1976 in Montreal, Canada; in 1984 in Los Angeles; and in 1988 in Seoul, South Korea. He was also named to the 1980 Olympic team for Canada, but did not compete due to the Canadian boycott of those Games. At the 1984 Games with his racing partner Alwyn Morris, he won two medals, a gold in the K-2 1000 m and a bronze in the K-2 500 m events.

Fisher and Morris also won medals at the ICF Canoe Sprint World Championships with a silver in the K-2 1000 m in 1982 and a bronze in the K-2 500 m in 1983.

In 1985, he was awarded the Order of Canada for his athletic achievements. In 1985 he was also inducted into the British Columbia Sports Hall of Fame, and is the only canoeing athlete honoured. He was inducted into the Canadian Olympic Hall of Fame in 1986, and to Canada's Sports Hall of Fame in 2000.

Fisher was for many years a medical doctor in the towns of Pemberton and Whistler, British Columbia.
