= Viktor Pusev =

Medal record

Men's canoe sprint

World Championships
Gold medal – first place	1989 Plovdiv	K-4 500 m
Gold medal – first place	1990 Poznań	K-4 500 m
Silver medal – second place	1985 Mechelen	K-2 1000 m
Bronze medal – third place	1985 Mechelen	K-2 500 m
Bronze medal – third place	1986 Montreal	K-2 500 m

Viktor Pusev (born 28 March 1966) is a Soviet sprint canoeist who competed from the mid-1980s to the early 1990s. He won five medals at the ICF Canoe Sprint World Championships with two golds (K-4 500 m: 1989, 1990), a silver (K-2 1000 m: 1985), and two bronzes (K-2 500 m: 1985, 1986).

Pusev also finished ninth in the K-1 500 m event at the 1988 Summer Olympics in Seoul.
