= Ilpo Nieminen =

Finnish sprint canoer (born 1961)

Ilpo Juhani Nieminen (born September 12, 1961 in Lempäälä) is a Finnish sprint canoer who competed in the mid-1980s. He was eliminated in the semifinals in both the K-2 500 m and the K-4 1000 m events at the 1984 Summer Olympics in Los Angeles.
