= Jan Baaijens =

Dutch sprint canoer (born 1957)

Jan Baaijens (born 10 March 1957, Zaandam) is a Dutch sprint canoer who competed in the early 1980s. At the 1980 Summer Olympics in Moscow, he was eliminated in the semifinals of the K-1 500 m, K-1 1000 m, and K-4 1000 m events.
