= Alwyn Morris =

Indigenous Canadian canoe racer

Personal information
- Born: November 22, 1957 (age 68) Kahnawake, Quebec, Canada

Sport
- Country: Canada
- Sport: Canoe racing
Medal record
Men's canoe sprint
Representing Canada
Olympic Games
Gold medal – first place	1984 Los Angeles	K-2 1000 m
Bronze medal – third place	1984 Los Angeles	K-2 500 m
World Championships
Silver medal – second place	1982 Belgrade	K-2 1000 m
Bronze medal – third place	1983 Tampere	K-2 500 m

Alwyn Morris, CM (born November 22, 1957) is a retired Canadian sprint kayaker. A member of the Mohawk nation in Kahnawake, he is considered one of the most influential Indigenous athletes of all time. He is the first and only Aboriginal Canadian athlete who won a gold medal at the Summer Olympic Games and one of the only three North American aboriginals to do so, alongside Jim Thorpe and Billy Mills.

== Sporting career ==
=== Early years ===
Morris was inspired to compete in elite level of canoeing while watching Olympic canoeing competition in his early teens. This pursuit received encouragement and guidance from his grandfather.

Morris' first notable canoeing accomplishment was winning the Canadian National Junior Title in 1977 for K-1 1,000 m, as well as K-1 500 m. He was the winner of multiple junior regional and provincial titles in late 1970s before he won six consecutive K-1 Canadian champions between 1980 and 1984.

Morris also won two medals at the ICF Canoe Sprint World Championships with a silver (K-2 1000 m: 1982) and a bronze (K-2 500 m: 1983).

=== 1984 Olympic Games ===
Morris was a medalist in the 1984 Los Angeles Olympic Games, winning a gold medal in K-2 1000 m, and a bronze medal in K-2 500 m with partner, Hugh Fisher.

== The Eagle Feather Salute ==
After winning the gold medal in K-2 1000m race with fellow Canadian Hugh Fisher, Morris raised an eagle feather when he was standing on the podium. It created widespread influence among Indigenous and non-Indigenous communities.

In a 2009 interview, Morris revealed the intentions behind his eagle feather salute in 1984. First, he wanted to pay tribute to his grandparents, who raised him through his youth. It was important for Morris to commemorate his grandfather, who died before he could witness Morris's achievement: "He wasn't there any longer and I needed to be able to show my respect for what he had taught me and went through with me."

Moreover, Morris saw his eagle feather salute as a way to share the victory with Indigenous Peoples in Canada but also demonstrated his Indigenous identity to Canadians: "It was pretty obvious I was there as an athlete representing Canada, and Canadians as a whole certainly were jubilant and happy that Hugh and I had accomplished our goal and brought home a gold medal for Canada...I am a Mohawk person, and I'm aboriginal in Canada and it was important for me to be self identified in order to share that with the other part of who I am."

The symbolism of Morris's Eagle Feather Salute has been compared with the Black Power salute of U.S. sprinters Tommie Smith and John Carlos in 1968 Olympics. They are both considered iconic examples where athletes used sport as a site to engage in political activism and resistance.

== Other Activities ==
After the Oka Crisis in 1990, Morris started his endeavors in politics, specifically concerning issues related to Indigenous self-governance. He has been an active member of Mohawk Council of Kahnawake and a policy advisor on aboriginal rights and land issues.

Having a vision to create sport programs that would empower Indigenous athletes and youth, Morris also helped create Aboriginal Sport Circle, a national organization that concerns the interests of Aboriginal sport, in 1995. He currently serves as the chairperson of Aboriginal Sport Circle.

On December 8, 2009 Morris carried the Olympic torch through Kahnawake, Quebec as part of the 2010 Vancouver Olympic Games torch relay.

== Recognition ==
He received the National Aboriginal Achievement Award, now the Indspire Awards, in the sports category and won the Tom Longboat Award in 1977 and 1984 that recognizes Aboriginal athletes outstanding contributions to sport in Canada. Morris was made a member of the Order of Canada on December 23, 1985 as recognition for his canoeing success, as well as his continued work with youths for organizations including Health and Welfare Canada's Native Drug Abuse Programme. He was also inducted in Canada's Sports Hall of Fame in 2000.

His athletic achievements were considered highly influential for Indigenous communities across Canada. Joe Delaronde, a staff member of the Mohawk Council commented: "I could never even fathom, that somebody from this community would be the best in the entire world".

== See also ==
- Angela Chalmers
