= Kouame N'Douba =

Ivorian canoeist

Kouame N'Douba (born June 16, 1964) is an Ivorian sprint canoer who competed in the mid to late 1980s. At the 1984 Summer Olympics in Los Angeles, he was eliminated in the repechages of the K-2 500 m event. Four years later in Seoul, N'Douba was eliminated in the repechages of the same event.
