= Saba Komkova =

Soviet canoeist

Medal record

Women's canoe sprint

Representing Soviet Union

ICF Canoe Sprint World Championships
Silver medal – second place	1982 Belgrade	K-4 500 m

Saba Komkova is a Soviet female sprint canoer who competed in the early 1980s. She won a silver medal in the K-4 500 m event at the 1982 ICF Canoe Sprint World Championships in Belgrade.
