= Peng Bo (canoeist) =

Chinese canoeist

Personal information
- Native name: 彭波
- Nationality: Chinese
- Born: 10 June 1962 (age 63) Wuhan, Hubei
- Height: 1.80 m (5 ft 11 in)
- Weight: 81 kg (179 lb)

Sport
- Country: China
- Sport: Canoe sprint
- Retired: Yes

Peng Bo (Chinese: 彭波; born June 10, 1962, in Wuhan) is a Chinese sprint canoer who competed in the mid-1980s. At the 1984 Summer Olympics in Los Angeles, he was eliminated in the repechages of the K-2 1000 m event.

After his retirement of a competing canoe sporter, Peng serves as a Senior Coach, the men's kayak coach in the Water Sports Administration Center of Hubei.
