= Eddie Kalleklev =

Norwegian canoeist (born 1957)

Eddie Kalleklev (born June 25, 1957) is a former Norwegian sprint canoer who competed in the mid-1980s. At the 1984 Summer Olympics in Los Angeles, he was eliminated in the semifinals of the K-2 500 m event. He is also 2 times Pan American Champion- 2 times Scandinavian champion- 4 times Norwegian champion in K-1 and got the King's Cup in 1983 and 1985. He had also qualified for the Olympics in Moscow in 1980. He retired his canoeing career in 1987. But in 2003, at an age of 46, he returned in the Norwegian Championship, after 16 years of retirement. He got the silver medal, 0,2 seconds away from the gold medal, in the K-4 500 meter final.

He is currently living in Norway, Bergen, and he is running the store "Herskap og Tjenere". He has five children, Joachim, Sebastian, Nicolai, Edward and Haakon.
