= Alexandru Dulău =

Medal record

Men's canoe sprint

World Championships
Silver medal – second place	1986 Montreal	K-4 10000 m

Alexandru Dulău (born April 13, 1964) is a Romanian sprint canoer who competed in the 1980s. At the 1984 Summer Olympics in Los Angeles, he was eliminated in the semifinals of the K-2 1000 m event. He won a silver medal in the K-4 10000 m event at the 1986 ICF Canoe Sprint World Championships in Montreal.
