= Canoeing at the 1988 Summer Olympics – Men's K-1 500 metres =

The men's K-1 500 metres event was an individual kayaking event conducted as part of the Canoeing at the 1988 Summer Olympics program.

== Medalists ==
| Gold | Silver | Bronze |
| Zsolt Gyulay (HUN) | Andreas Stähle (GDR) | Paul MacDonald (NZL) |

== Results ==
=== Heats ===
The 18 competitors first raced in three heats on September 26. The top three finishers from each of the heats advanced directly to the semifinals with the rest competing in the repechages.

Heat 1
| 1. | Zsolt Gyulay (HUN) | 1:41.24 | QS |
| 2. | Paul MacDonald (NZL) | 1:41.65 | QS |
| 3. | Viktor Pusev (URS) | 1:42.30 | QS |
| 4. | Mike Herbert (USA) | 1:43.41 | QR |
| 5. | Martin Hunter (AUS) | 1:46.35 | QR |
| 6. | Renn Crichlow (CAN) | 1:47.53 | QR |
| 7. | Jeremy West (GBR) | 1:58.29 | QR |
Heat 2
| 1. | Andreas Stähle (GDR) | 1:44.26 | QS |
| 2. | Einar Rasmussen (NOR) | 1:44.50 | QS |
| 3. | Attila Szabó (TCH) | 1:45.06 | QS |
| 4. | Kalle Sundqvist (SWE) | 1:46.32 | QR |
| 5. | Cheon in-Sik (KOR) | 1:49.86 | QR |
| 6. | José Garcia (POR) | 1:57.83 | QR |
Heat 3
| 1. | Dirk Joestel (FRG) | 1:45.64 | QS |
| 2. | Geert Deldaele (BEL) | 1:46.71 | QS |
| 3. | Francisco Leal (ESP) | 1:47.71 | QS |
| 4. | Luzius Philipp (SUI) | 1:49.08 | QR |
| 5. | Tang Kwok Cheung (HKG) | 2:01.92 | QR |

=== Repechages ===
Taking place on September 26, the top four finishers from the second repechage advanced to the semifinals. The first repechage was scheduled, but not held since there were only three competitors. One competitor was disqualified in the second repechage for reasons not disclosed in the official report.

Repechage 1
| - | Renn Crichlow (CAN) | - | QS |
| - | Cheon in-Sik (KOR) | - | QS |
| - | Luzius Philipp (SUI) | - | QS |
Repechage 2
| 1. | Martin Hunter (AUS) | 1:45.10 | QS |
| 2. | Kalle Sundqvist (SWE) | 1:46.77 | QS |
| 3. | Jeremy West (GBR) | 2:01.16 | QS |
| 4. | Tang Kwok Cheung (HKG) | 2:12.91 | QS |
| - | José Garcia (POR) | DISQ |

=== Semifinals ===
The top three finishers in each of the three semifinals (raced on September 28) advanced to the final.

Semifinal 1
| 1. | Zsolt Gyulay (HUN) | 1:41.52 | QF |
| 2. | Mike Herbert (USA) | 1:43.40 | QF |
| 3. | Attila Szabó (TCH) | 1:43.89 | QF |
| 4. | Renn Crichlow (CAN) | 1:46.51 |
| 5. | Jeremy West (GBR) | 1:46.65 |
| 6. | Geert Deldaele (BEL) | 1:47.21 |
Semifinal 2
| 1. | Paul MacDonald (NZL) | 1:43.33 | QF |
| 2. | Kalle Sundqvist (SWE) | 1:44.45 | QF |
| 3. | Andreas Stähle (GDR) | 1:45.51 | QF |
| 4. | Francisco Leal (ESP) | 1:46.93 |
| 5. | Tang Kwok Cheung (HKG) | 2:03.22 |
| - | Luzius Philipp (SUI) | Did not start |
Semifinal 3
| 1. | Viktor Pusev (URS) | 1:42.90 | QF |
| 2. | Martin Hunter (AUS) | 1:43.36 | QF |
| 3. | Dirk Joestel (FRG) | 1:43.97 | QF |
| 4. | Einar Rasmussen (NOR) | 1:45.15 |
| 5. | Cheon in-Sik (KOR) | 1:51.17 |

Philipp's reason for not starting was not disclosed in the official report.

=== Final ===
The final was held on September 30.

| Gold | Zsolt Gyulay (HUN) | 1:44.82 |
| Silver | Andreas Stähle (GDR) | 1:46.38 |
| Bronze | Paul MacDonald (NZL) | 1:46.46 |
| 4. | Mike Herbert (USA) | 1:46.73 |
| 5. | Kalle Sundqvist (SWE) | 1:46.76 |
| 6. | Attila Szabó (TCH) | 1:47.38 |
| 7. | Martin Hunter (AUS) | 1:47.66 |
| 8. | Dirk Joestel (FRG) | 1:47.91 |
| 9. | Viktor Pusev (URS) | 1:48.83 |
