= Alain Lebas =

French canoeist

Medal record

Men's canoe sprint

Olympic Games
Silver medal – second place	1980 Moscow	K-1 1000 m

World Championships
Silver medal – second place	1978 Belgrade	K-2 10000 m
Bronze medal – third place	1979 Duisburg	K-2 500 m

Alain Lebas (born 10 November 1953) is a French sprint canoeist who competed from the late 1970s to the early 1980s. Competing in two Summer Olympics, he won a silver medal in the K-1 1000 m event at Moscow in 1980.

Lebas also won two medals at the ICF Canoe Sprint World Championships with a silver (K-2 10000 m: 1978) and a bronze (K-2 500 m: 1979).
