= Patrick De Bucke =

Belgian sprint canoer

Patrick Debucke (Ghent, 24 October 1957) is a Belgian canoe sprinter who competed in the mid-1980s. At the 1984 Summer Olympics in Los Angeles, he finished ninth in the K-2 1000 m event with his teammate Patrick Hanssens, while being eliminated in the semifinals of the K-2 500 m event.
