= Dezső Csépai =

Hungarian canoeist

Medal record

Men's canoe sprint

World Championships
| Silver medal – second place | 1982 Belgrade | C-1 1000 m |

Dezső Csépai (1953-2007) is a Hungarian sprint canoer who competed in the early 1980s. He won a silver medal in the C-1 1000 m event at the 1982 ICF Canoe Sprint World Championships in Belgrade.
