= Tamás Szélesi =

Hungarian canoeist

Medal record

Men's canoe sprint

World Championships
Bronze medal – third place	1982 Belgrade	K-4 10000 m

Tamás Szélesi is a Hungarian sprint canoer who competed from the early 1980s. He won a bronze medal in the K-4 10000 m event at the 1982 ICF Canoe Sprint World Championships in Belgrade.
