= Waldemar Merk =

Polish canoeist

Medal record

Men's canoe sprint

World Championships
Silver medal – second place	1981 Nottingham	K-2 500 m
Bronze medal – third place	1981 Nottingham	K-2 1000 m

Waldemar Merk (born June 13, 1959) is a Polish sprint canoer who competed in the early 1980s. He won two medals at the 1981 ICF Canoe Sprint World Championships in Nottingham with a silver in the K-2 500 m and a bronze in the K-2 1000 m events.

Merk also competed at the 1980 Summer Olympics in Moscow, finishing seventh in the K-2 500 m and being eliminated in the semifinals of the K-1 1000 m events.
