= Helmut Lehmann (canoeist) =

Swiss canoeist

Helmut Lehmann (born 6 October 1958) is a Swiss sprint canoer who competed in the early to mid-1980s. At the 1980 Summer Olympics in Moscow, he was eliminated in the semifinals of the K-1 500 m and the K-1 1000 m events. Four years later in Los Angeles, Lehmann was eliminated in the repechages of the K-2 500 m event and the semifinals of the K-4 1000 m event.
