= Florian Marinescu (canoeist) =

Romanian canoeist

Medal record

Men's canoe sprint

World Championships
| Silver medal – second place | 1982 Belgrade | K-4 10000 m |

Florian Marinescu is a Romanian sprint canoer who competed from the early 1980s. He won a silver medal in the K-4 10000 m event at the 1982 ICF Canoe Sprint World Championships in Belgrade.
