= Gianluca Galimberti =

Italian politician

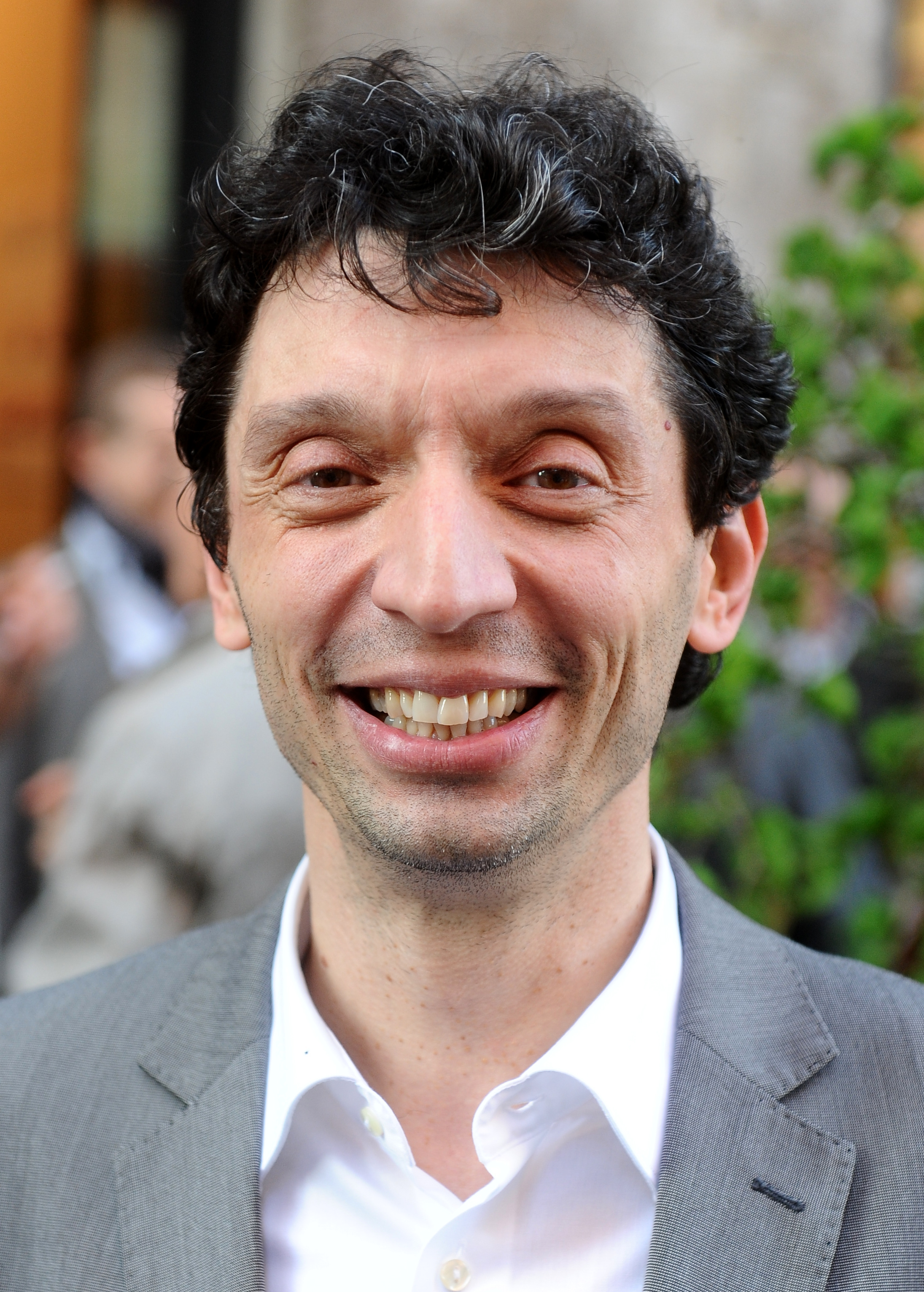

Mayor of Cremona
- In office 10 June 2014 – 26 June 2024
- Preceded by: Oreste Perri
- Succeeded by: Andrea Virgilio

Personal details
- Born: 30 May 1968 (age 58) Cremona, Lombardy, Italy
- Party: Democratic Party
- Education: University of Pavia
- Profession: professor, physicist

Gianluca Galimberti (born 30 May 1968 in Cremona) is an Italian professor and politician.

He is a member of the Democratic Party and he was elected Mayor of Cremona on 8 June 2014 and took office on 10 June. He has been re-elected for a second term in 2019.

== Biography ==
He graduated with a grade of 60/60 from the Liceo Classico in Cremona in 1987. He earned a bachelor’s degree in Physics with a grade of 110/110 summa cum laude from the University of Pavia, where he was a student at the Collegio Borromeo. He subsequently earned his Ph.D. (24th cycle) from the University of Milan in January 2012, with a dissertation titled: Time-Resolved Optical Measurements on Different Carbon Nanotube Architectures.

Currently, in addition to teaching physics at a high school, he has been a contract professor at the Catholic Università Cattolica del Sacro Cuore in Brescia since 1999. His main courses have included general physics, mechanics, thermodynamics, and physics laboratory for undergraduate students. He has also served as an adjunct professor for other courses, such as optoelectronics, physics education in the Department of Education, and physics in the Department of Agriculture.

In February 2014, he received 71.09% of the vote in the center-left primary for the municipality of Cremona, thereby becoming the candidate for mayor of the city.

In the local elections held on 25 May 2014 he emerged as the strongest challenger to the incumbent Centre-right coalition (Italy) mayor, former canoeist Oreste Perri. Galimberti’s coalition secured 45.80% of the vote in the first round, while Perri’s coalition garnered 33.31%. In the runoff on 8 June, Galimberti defeated Perri with 56.31% of the vote and was elected mayor.

In 2019, he ran for mayor again; in the 26 May election he received 46.37% of the vote, advancing to a runoff against Centre-right politics candidate Carlo Malvezzi, who received 41.65%; in the runoff on 9 June, Galimberti received 55.94% of the vote and was re-elected mayor.

== See also ==
- 2014 Italian local elections
- 2019 Italian local elections
- List of mayors of Cremona

Political offices
Preceded by Oreste Perri	Mayor of Cremona since 2014	Succeeded by
