= Felix Masár =

Slovak sprint canoeist

Medal record

Men's canoe sprint

World Championships
Bronze medal – third place	1979 Duisburg	K-1 1000 m

Felix Masár (born December 2, 1955, in Šamorín) is a Slovak sprint canoeist who competed for Czechoslovakia in the late 1970s and early 1980s. He won a bronze medal in the K-1 1000 m event at the 1979 ICF Canoe Sprint World Championships in Duisburg.

Masár also competed at the 1980 Summer Olympics in Moscow, finishing sixth in the K-1 1000 m and eighth in the K-1 500 m events.
