= Martin Hunter (canoeist) =

Australian canoeist (born 1965)

Medal record

Men's canoe sprint

World Championships
Gold medal – first place	1989 Plovdiv	K-1 500 m
Bronze medal – third place	1990 Poznań	K-1 500 m
Bronze medal – third place	1994 Mexico City	K-2 500 m

Martin Hunter (born 3 October 1965) is an Australian sprint canoeist who competed from the late 1980s to the mid-1990s. He won three medals at the ICF Canoe Sprint World Championships with a gold (K-1 500 m: 1989) and two bronzes (K-1 500 m: 1990, K-2 500 m: 1994).

Hunter also competed in two Summer Olympics, earning his best finish of seventh in the K-1 500 m event at Seoul in 1988.

He was an Australian Institute of Sport sprint canoeing scholarship holder in 1988, 1990 and 1996.
