= Gao Ludong =

Chinese canoeist

Personal information
- Native name: 高鲁东
- Nationality: Chinese
- Born: 8 April 1960 (age 66) Huangyan, Taizhou
- Height: 1.80 m (5 ft 11 in)
- Weight: 80 kg (180 lb)

Sport
- Country: China
- Sport: male sprint canoeist
- Retired: yes

Gao Ludong
- Traditional Chinese: 高魯東
- Simplified Chinese: 高鲁东
Transcriptions
Standard Mandarin
- Hanyu Pinyin: Gāo Lǔ Dōng

Gao Lundong (simplified Chinese: 高鲁东; traditional Chinese: 高魯東; pinyin: Gāo Lǔ Dōng; born April 18, 1960) is a Chinese sprint canoeist who competed in the mid-1980s. At the 1984 Summer Olympics in Los Angeles, he was eliminated in the repechages of the K-2 500 m event.
