= Canoeing at the 1984 Summer Olympics – Men's K-2 500 metres =

The men's K-2 500 metres event was a pairs kayaking event conducted as part of the Canoeing at the 1984 Summer Olympics program.

== Medalists ==
Gold	Silver	Bronze
Ian Ferguson and Paul MacDonald (NZL)	Per-Inge Bengtsson and Lars-Erik Moberg (SWE)	Hugh Fisher and Alwyn Morris (CAN)

== Results ==
=== Heats ===
21 crews were entered into the event on August 6. The top three finishers from each of the heats advanced directly to the semifinals while the remaining teams were relegated to the repechages.

Heat 1
1.	Ian Ferguson and Paul MacDonald (NZL)	1:36.82	QS
2.	Per-Inge Bengtsson and Lars-Erik Moberg (SWE)	1:37.12	QS
3.	Nicolae Fedosel and Angelin Velea (ROU)	1:37.94	QS
4.	Werner Bachmeyer and Wolfgang Hartl (AUT)	1:38.00	QR
5.	Rein Gilje and Eddie Kalleklev (NOR)	1:40.30	QR
6.	Peter Genders and Martin Ralph (AUS)	1:41.24	QR
7.	Tang Kwok Cheung and Tsoi Ngai Won (HKG)	1:59.75	QR
Heat 2
1.	Hugh Fisher and Alwyn Morris (CAN)	1:36.30	QS
2.	Daniele Scarpa and Francesco Uberti (ITA)	1:36.72	QS
3.	Matthias Seack and Oliver Seack (FRG)	1:38.57	QS
4.	David Halpern and Terry Kent (USA)	1:39.94	QR
5.	Patrick De Bucke and Patrick Hanssens (BEL)	1:39.97	QR
6.	Gao Ludong and Shen Yongjin (CHN)	1:46.29	QR
7.	Melagne Lath and Kouame N'Douba (CIV)	1:49.82	QR
Heat 3
1.	Andrew Sheriff and Jeremy West (GBR)	1:37.54	QS
2.	Francis Hervieu and Daniel Legras (FRA)	1:37.97	QS
3.	Gert Jan Lebbink and Ron Stevens (NED)	1:38.29	QS
4.	Herminio Menéndez and Guillermo del Riego (ESP)	1:38.88	QR
5.	Kazumori Koike and Hisao Yanagisawa (JPN)	1:44.95	QR
6.	Ilpo Nieminen and Mika Savilahti (FIN)	1:46.70	QR
7.	Peter Ammann and Helmut Lehmann (SUI)	1:51.72	QR

=== Repechages ===
The 12 crews first raced in two repechages on August 6. The top three finishers from each of the repechages advanced directly to the semifinals.

Repechage 1
1.	Werner Bachmeyer and Wolfgang Hartl (AUT)	1:40.12	QS
2.	Ilpo Nieminen and Mika Savilahti (FIN)	1:40.73	QS
3.	Patrick De Bucke and Patrick Hanssens (BEL)	1:41.97	QS
4.	Peter Genders and Martin Ralph (AUS)	1:42.45
5.	Kazumori Koike and Hisao Yanagisawa (JPN)	1:47.42
6.	Melagne Lath and Kouame N'Douba (CIV)	1:47.48
Repechage 2
1.	Herminio Menéndez and Guillermo del Riego (ESP)	1:39.60	QS
2.	Rein Gilje and Eddie Kalleklev (NOR)	1:40.80	QS
3.	David Halpern and Terry Kent (USA)	1:40.87	QS
4.	Peter Ammann and Helmut Lehmann (SUI)	1:41.35
5.	Gao Ludong and Shen Yongjin (CHN)	1:45.74
6.	Tang Kwok Cheung and Tsoi Ngai Won (HKG)	1:52.81

=== Semifinals ===
The top three finishers in each of the semifinals (raced on August 8) advanced to the final.

Semifinal 1
1.	Ian Ferguson and Paul MacDonald (NZL)	1:36.10	QF
2.	Daniele Scarpa and Francesco Uberti (ITA)	1:37.20	QF
3.	Werner Bachmeyer and Wolfgang Hartl (AUT)	1:37.79	QF
4.	David Halpern and Terry Kent (USA)	1:38.59
5.	Gert Jan Lebbink and Ron Stevens (NED)	1:42.08
Semifinal 2
1.	Hugh Fisher and Alwyn Morris (CAN)	1:35.45	QF
2.	Nicolae Fedosel and Angelin Velea (ROU)	1:36.60	QF
3.	Francis Hervieu and Daniel Legras (FRA)	1:36.79	QF
4.	Herminio Menéndez and Guillermo del Riego (ESP)	1:37.38
5.	Patrick De Bucke and Patrick Hanssens (BEL)	1:40.59
Semifinal 3
1.	Andrew Sheriff and Jeremy West (GBR)	1:36.56	QF
2.	Matthias Seack and Oliver Seack (FRG)	1:37.00	QF
3.	Per-Inge Bengtsson and Lars-Erik Moberg (SWE)	1:37.82	QF
4.	Ilpo Nieminen and Mika Savilahti (FIN)	1:38.48
5.	Rein Gilje and Eddie Kalleklev (NOR)	1:38.64

=== Final ===
The final was held on August 10.

Gold	Ian Ferguson and Paul MacDonald (NZL)	1:34.21
Silver	Per-Inge Bengtsson and Lars-Erik Moberg (SWE)	1:35.26
Bronze	Hugh Fisher and Alwyn Morris (CAN)	1:35.41
4.	Daniele Scarpa and Francesco Uberti (ITA)	1:35.50
5.	Nicolae Fedosel and Angelin Velea (ROU)	1:35.60
6.	Francis Hervieu and Daniel Legras (FRA)	1:36.40
7.	Matthias Seack and Oliver Seack (FRG)	1:36.51
8.	Andrew Sheriff and Jeremy West (GBR)	1:36.73
9.	Werner Bachmeyer and Wolfgang Hartl (AUT)	1:37.05
