= 1982 ICF Canoe Sprint World Championships =

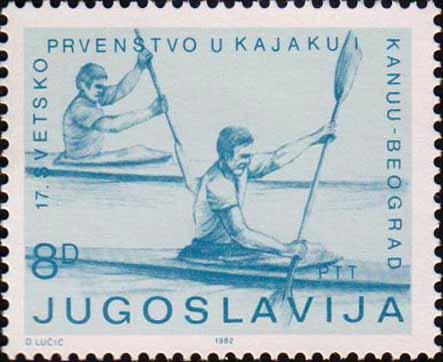
Yugoslav stamp dedicated to the 1982 ICF Canoe Sprint World Championships

The 1982 ICF Canoe Sprint World Championships were held in Belgrade, Yugoslavia for the record fourth time. The Yugoslavian (now Serbian) city had host the championships previously in 1971, 1975, and 1978.

The men's competition consisted of six Canadian (single paddle, open boat) and nine kayak events. Three events were held for the women, all in kayak.

This was the seventeenth championships in canoe sprint.

== Medal summary ==
=== Men's ===
==== Canoe ====
Event	Gold	Time	Silver	Time	Bronze	Time
C-1 500 m	Olaf Heukrodt (GDR)		János Sarusi Kis (HUN)		Sergey Postrechin (URS)	
C-1 1000 m	Jörg Schmidt (GDR)		Dezső Csépai (HUN)		Vassily Beresa (URS)	
C-1 10000 m	Tamás Wichmann (HUN)		Jiří Vrdlovec (TCH)		Gheorghe Titu (ROU)	
C-2 500 m	Yugoslavia; Matija Ljubek; Mirko Nišović		Soviet Union; Yuriy Laptikov; Sergey Petrenko		Hungary; László Foltán; István Vaskúti	
C-2 1000 m	Hungary; János Sarusi Kis; Gyula Hajdu		Yugoslavia; Matija Ljubek; Mirko Nišović		East Germany; Olaf Heukrodt; Uwe Madeja	
C-2 10000 m	Romania; Ivan Patzaichin; Toma Simionov		Soviet Union; Vassily Beresa; Edem Muradosilov		Hungary; Tamás Buday; László Vaskúti	

==== Kayak ====
Event	Gold	Time	Silver	Time	Bronze	Time
K-1 500 m	Vladimir Parfenovich (URS)		Peter Hempel (GDR)		Lars-Erik Moberg (SWE)	
K-1 1000 m	Rüdiger Helm (GDR)		Alan Thompson (NZL)		Einar Rasmussen (NOR)	
K-1 10000 m	Milan Janić (YUG)		Einar Rasmussen (NOR)		Nikolay Astapkovich (URS)	
K-2 500 m	Soviet Union; Vladimir Parfenovich; Sergey Superata		New Zealand; Alan Thompson; Paul MacDonald		West Germany; Matthias Seack; Oliver Seack	
K-2 1000 m	Soviet Union; Vladimir Parfenovich; Sergey Superata		Canada; Alwyn Morris; Hugh Fisher		Spain; Luis Gregorio Ramos; Herminio Rodriguez	
K-2 10000 m	France; Bernard Brégeon; Patrick Lefoulon		Netherlands; Ron Stevens; Gert Jan Lebbink		Hungary; István Szabó; István Tóth	
K-4 500 m	Soviet Union; Sergey Krivozheyev; Igor Gaydamaka; Sergey Kolokolov; Aleksander Vodovatov		East Germany; Frank-Peter Bischof; Frank Fischer; Rüdiger Helm; Harald Marg		Sweden; Jens Nordqvist; Lars-Erik Moberg; Per-Inge Bengtsson; Thomas Ohlsson	
K-4 1000 m	Sweden; Per-Inge Bengtsson; Lars-Erik Moberg; Thomas Ohlsson; Bengt Andersson		East Germany; Frank-Peter Bischof; Peter Hempel; Rüdiger Helm; Harald Marg		West Germany; Matthias Seack; Oliver Seack; Frank Renner; Bernd Hessel	
K-4 10000 m	Soviet Union; Alexander Yermilov; Nikolay Baranov; Sergei Chukhray; Vladimir Romanovsky		Romania; Petrica Dimofte; Florian Marinescu; Ionel Igorov; Anghei Coman		Hungary; Kálmán Petrikovics; Tamás Szekes; László Rasztotzky; Tibor Helyl	

=== Women's ===
==== Kayak ====
Event	Gold	Time	Silver	Time	Bronze	Time
K-1 500 m	Birgit Fischer (GDR)		Agneta Andersson (SWE)		Éva Rakusz (HUN)	
K-2 500 m	East Germany; Birgit Fischer; Bettina Streussel		Hungary; Katalin Povázsán; Erika Géczi		Sweden; Karin Olsson; Agneta Andersson	
K-4 500 m	East Germany; Birgit Fischer; Bettina Streussel; Roswitha Eberl; Kathrin Giese		Soviet Union; Inna Zhipulina; Nelli Yefremova; Yekaterina Golubeva; Saba Komkova		Hungary; Agnes Dragos; Erika Géczi; Katalin Povázsán; Éva Rakusz	

== Medals table ==
Rank	Nation	Gold	Silver	Bronze	Total
1	East Germany (GDR)	6	3	1	10
2	Soviet Union (URS)	5	3	3	11
3	Hungary (HUN)	2	3	6	11
4	Yugoslavia (YUG)	2	1	0	3
5	Sweden (SWE)	1	1	3	5
6	Romania (ROU)	1	1	1	3
7	France (FRA)	1	0	0	1
8	New Zealand (NZL)	0	2	0	2
9	Norway (NOR)	0	1	1	2
10	Canada (CAN)	0	1	0	1
10	Czechoslovakia (TCH)	0	1	0	1
10	Netherlands (NED)	0	1	0	1
13	West Germany (FRG)	0	0	2	2
14	Spain (ESP)	0	0	1	1
Totals (14 entries)		18	18	18	54
