= Anghei Coman =

Romanian sprint canoer

Medal record

Men's canoe sprint

World Championships
Silver medal – second place	1982 Belgrade	K-4 10000 m

Anghei Coman is a Romanian sprint canoer who competed from the early 1980s. He won a silver medal in the K-4 10000 m event at the 1982 ICF Canoe Sprint World Championships in Belgrade.
