= Rein Gilje =

Norwegian sprint canoer (born 1959)

Rein Gilje (born 17 May 1959 in Flekkefjord) is a Norwegian sprint canoeist who competed in the mid-1980s. At the 1984 Summer Olympics in Los Angeles, he was eliminated in the semifinals of the K-2 500 m event.
