= Renzo Zaffanella =

Italian politician (1929–2020)

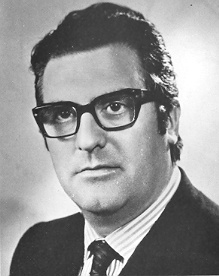
Portrait of Renzo Zaffanella

Renzo Zaffanella (23 October 1929 – 4 October 2020) was an Italian politician.

== Biography ==
A member of the Italian Socialist Party, Zaffanella sat in the Chamber of Deputies representing Mantua and Cremona from 1968 to 1978. He was elected mayor of Cremona in 1980 and served until 1990.
