= Terry White (sprint canoeist) =

American canoeist (born 1955)

Personal information
- Born: October 15, 1955 (age 70) Peru, Vermont, United States

Sport
- Sport: Canoeing
Medal record
Representing United States
Pan American Games
Gold medal – first place	1987 Indianapolis	K-4 1000m

Carl Terence "Terry" White (born October 15, 1955) is an American sprint canoer who competed in the mid to late 1980s. Competing in two Summer Olympics, he earned his best finish of fourth in the K-2 1000 m event at Los Angeles in 1984.

Raised in Peru, Vermont, White attended Middlebury College.
