= Ágnes Dragos =

Hungarian canoeist

Medal record

Women's canoe sprint

World Championships
Bronze medal – third place	1982 Belgrade	K-4 500 m

Ágnes Dragos ( ) is a Hungarian sprint canoer who competed in the early 1980s. She won a bronze medal in the K-4 500 m event at the 1982 ICF Canoe Sprint World Championships in Belgrade.
