= Chun In-shik =

South Korean canoeist (born 1968)

Personal information
- Nationality: South Korean
- Born: March 5, 1968 (age 58)
- Height: 184 cm (6 ft 0 in)
- Weight: 76 kg (168 lb)

Sport
- Sport: Canoe spring

Korean name
- Hangul: 천인식
- Hanja: 千仁植
- RR: Cheon Insik
- MR: Ch'ŏn Insik
Medal record
Men's canoe sprint
Representing South Korea
Asian Games
Gold medal – first place	1990 Beijing	K-1 1000 m
Gold medal – first place	1990 Beijing	K-2 500 m
Gold medal – first place	1990 Beijing	K-2 1000 m

Chun In-shik (born March 5, 1968) is a South Korean sprint canoer who competed in the late 1980s. At the 1988 Summer Olympics in Seoul, he was eliminated in the semifinals of the K-1 500 m event and the repechages of the K-4 1000 m event.
