= Dirk Joestel =

West German sprint canoer

Dirk Joestel (born 14 August 1965 in Berlin) is a West German sprint canoer who competed in the late 1980s. At the 1988 Summer Olympics in Seoul, he finished sixth in the K-4 1000 m event and eighth in the K-1 500 m event.
