= Vassiliy Beresa =

Soviet canoeist

Medal record

Men's canoe sprint

World Championships
Gold medal – first place	1983 Tampere	C-1 1000 m
Silver medal – second place	1982 Belgrade	C-2 10000 m
Bronze medal – third place	1982 Belgrade	C-1 1000 m

Vassiliy Beresa (sometimes listed as Vasiliy Beresa is a Soviet sprint canoer who competed in the early 1980s. He won a complete set of medals at the ICF Canoe Sprint World Championships with a gold in 1983 (C-1 1000 m), a silver in 1982 (C-2 10000 m), and a bronze in 1982 (C-1 1000 m).
