= Melagne Lath =

Ivorian canoeist (born 1963)

Melagne Lath (born September 2, 1963) is an Ivorian sprint canoer who competed in the mid to late 1980s. At the 1984 Summer Olympics in Los Angeles, he was eliminated in the repechages of the K-2 500 m event. Four years later in Seoul, Lath was eliminated in the repechages of the same event.
