= Ralph Martin =

Ralf, Rafe or Ralph Martin may refer to:

== Sportsmen ==
- William Ralph Martin Leake (1865–1942), English rugby union forward
- Ralph Martin Huff (born 1948), American football linebacker
- Ralph Martin Treuel (born 1955), American baseball coach
- Ralf Martin (born 1967), German racing driver

== Writers ==
- Ralph G. Martin (1920–2013), American political biographer
- Ralph P. Martin (1925–2013), English academic and New Testament scholar
- David Ralph Martin (1935–2007), English television and film writer
- Rafe Martin (born 1946), American writer of children's literature for North Atlantic Books
- Ralph C. Martin (born 1942), American Catholic academic and writer since 1960s
- Ralph Martin, American journalist and founder in 1997 of CNHI publications

== Others ==
- Ralph P. Martin (before 1950—2017), American actor in 1998 film The Dentist 2
- Ralph Martin Publicover (born 1952), British diplomat (List of ambassadors of the United Kingdom to Angola)
- Ralph Martin, Western Australian Government Astronomer from 2010 to 2013
- Ralph Martin, American banjoist (American Banjo Museum Hall of Fame members in 2003)

== Characters ==
- Ralph Martin, character in 1933 American film Stage Mother

== See also ==
- Martin Ralph (canoeist) (born 1960), Australian Olympic sprint canoer
