= Young-jin =

- Hangul: 영진
- RR: Yeongjin
- MR: Yŏngjin

Young-jin, also spelled Young-jean, Yeong-jin, or Yong-jin, is a Korean given name. It was the sixth-most-popular name for South Korean newborn boys in 1960, falling to tenth place by 1970.

== People ==
People with this name include:

=== Entertainers ===
- Yoo Young-jin (born 1971), South Korean male pop singer-songwriter and executive of SM Entertainment
- Lee Young-jin (actress) (born 1981), South Korean actress

=== Sportspeople ===
- Lee Young-jin (footballer, born 1963), South Korea male football manager and former player
- Lee Young-jin (footballer, born 1972), South Korea male football coach and former player
- Kim Young-jin (born 1984), South Korean male field hockey player
- Suk Young-jin (born 1990), South Korean male bobsledder

=== Other ===
- Young Jin Cho (born 1946), South Korean-born American Methodist bishop
- Choi Young-jin (born 1948), South Korean male United Nations official
- Kwon Yong-jin, North Korean politician and military officer
- Young Jean Lee (born 1974), South Korean-born American female playwright

== See also ==
- Yong-jin
- List of Korean given names
