= Tang Kwok Cheung =

Hong Kong sprint canoiest

Tang Kwok Cheung (born April 20, 1965) is a Hong Kong sprint canoer who competed in the mid to late 1980s. At the 1984 Summer Olympics in Los Angeles, he was eliminated in the repechages of both the K-2 500 m and the K-4 1000 m events. Four years later in Seoul, Tang was eliminated in the semifinals of the K-1 500 m event.
