= List of mayors of Cremona =

Mayor of Cremona
- Sindaco di Cremona
- Incumbent; Andrea Virgilio (PD) since 26 June 2024
- Appointer: Electorate of Cremona
- Term length: 5 years, renewable once
- Formation: 1860
- Website: Official website

The mayor of Cremona is an elected politician who, along with the Cremona's city council, is accountable for the strategic government of Cremona in Lombardy, Italy.

The current mayor is Andrea Virgilio (PD), who took office on 26 June 2024.

== Overview ==
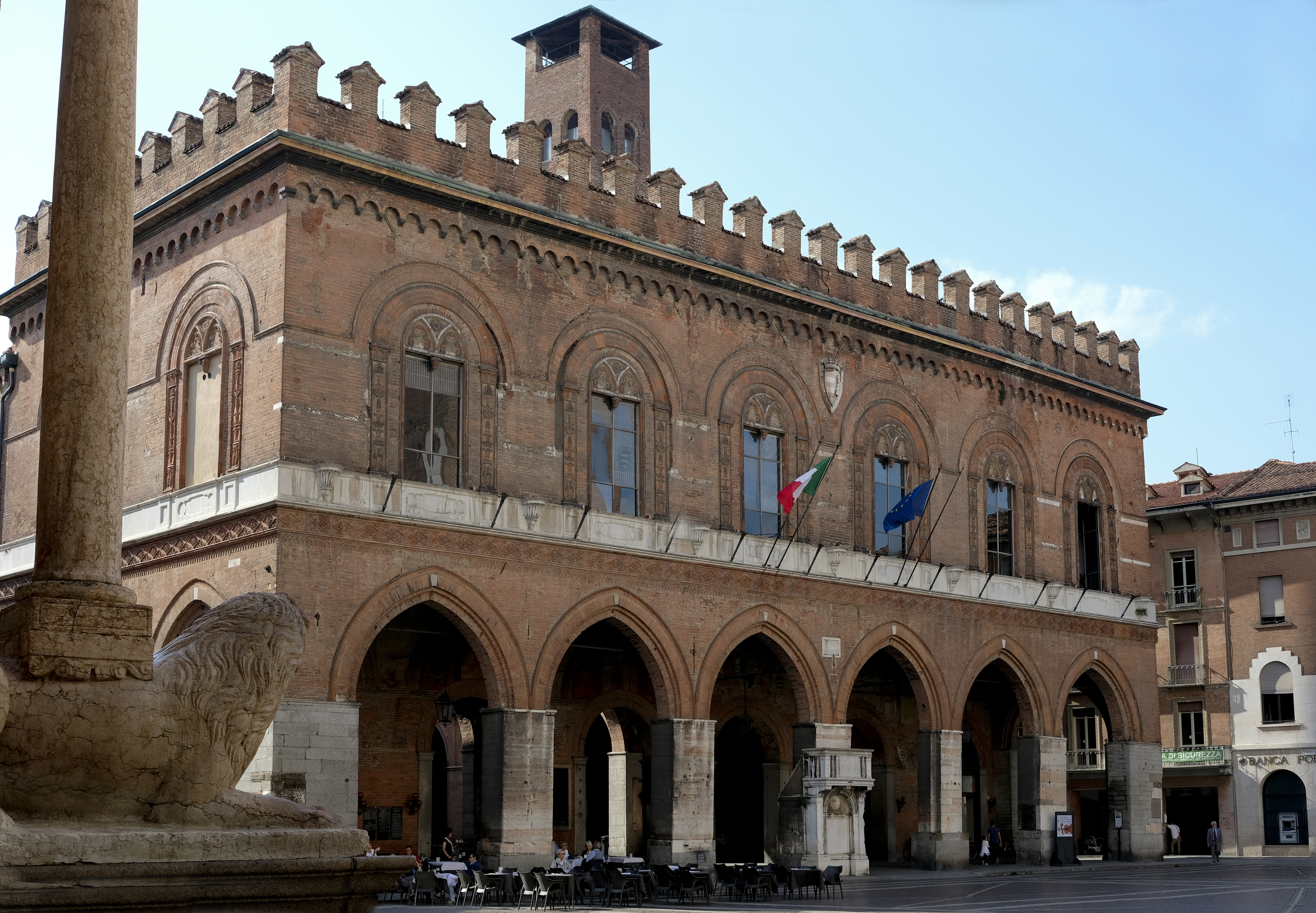
Palazzo del Comune is the seat of the Mayor of Cremona.

According to the Italian Constitution, the mayor of Cremona is member of the city council.

The mayor is elected by the population of Cremona, who also elect the members of the city council, controlling the mayor's policy guidelines and is able to enforce his resignation by a motion of no confidence. The mayor is entitled to appoint and release the members of his government.

Since 1995 the mayor is elected directly by Cremona's electorate: in all mayoral elections in Italy in cities with a population higher than 15,000 the voters express a direct choice for the mayor or an indirect choice voting for the party of the candidate's coalition. If no candidate receives at least 50% of votes, the top two candidates go to a second round after two weeks. The election of the City Council is based on a direct choice for the candidate with a preference vote: the candidate with the majority of the preferences is elected. The number of the seats for each party is determined proportionally.

== Republic of Italy (since 1946) ==
=== City Council election (1946-1995) ===
From 1946 to 1995, the Mayor of Cremona was elected by the City Council.

	Mayor	Term start	Term end	Party
1	Gino Rossini	1946	1948	PSI
2	Ottorino Rizzi	1948	1952	DC
3	Giovani Lombardi	1952	1956	DC
Giovanni Salazar, Special Prefectural Commissioner (1956–1957)
4	Arnaldo Feraboli	1957	1961	PSI
5	Vincenzo Vernaschi	1961	1968	DC
Giovanni Santini, Special Prefectural Commissioner (1968–1970)
6	Emilio Zanoni	1970	1980	PSI
7	Renzo Zaffanella	1980	1990	PSI
8	Alfeo Garini	1990	1995	DC

=== Direct election (since 1995) ===
Since 1995, enacting a new law on local administrations (1993), the Mayor of Cremona is chosen by direct election, originally every four, and since 1999 every five years.

	Mayor of Cremona	Took office	Left office	Party	Coalition	Election
9	Paolo Bodini (b. 1948)	27 June 1995	14 June 1999	PDS; DS	The Olive Tree (PDS-PPI-FdV)	1995
9	Paolo Bodini (b. 1948)	14 June 1999	14 June 2004	PDS; DS	The Olive Tree (DS-PPI-FdV-PdCI)	1999
10	Giancarlo Corada (b. 1951)	14 June 2004	23 June 2009	DS; PD	The Olive Tree (DS-DL-FdV-PRC)	2004
11	Oreste Perri (b. 1951)	23 June 2009	10 June 2014	PdL	PdL • LN	2009
12	Gianluca Galimberti (b. 1968)	10 June 2014	10 June 2019	PD	PD • SEL and leftist lists	2014
12	Gianluca Galimberti (b. 1968)	10 June 2019	26 June 2024	PD	PD • SI and leftist lists	2019
13	Andrea Virgilio (b. 1973)	26 June 2024	Incumbent	PD	PD • AVS and leftist lists	2024

== See also ==
- Timeline of Cremona
