= Sacristy =

Storage room in or attached to a church

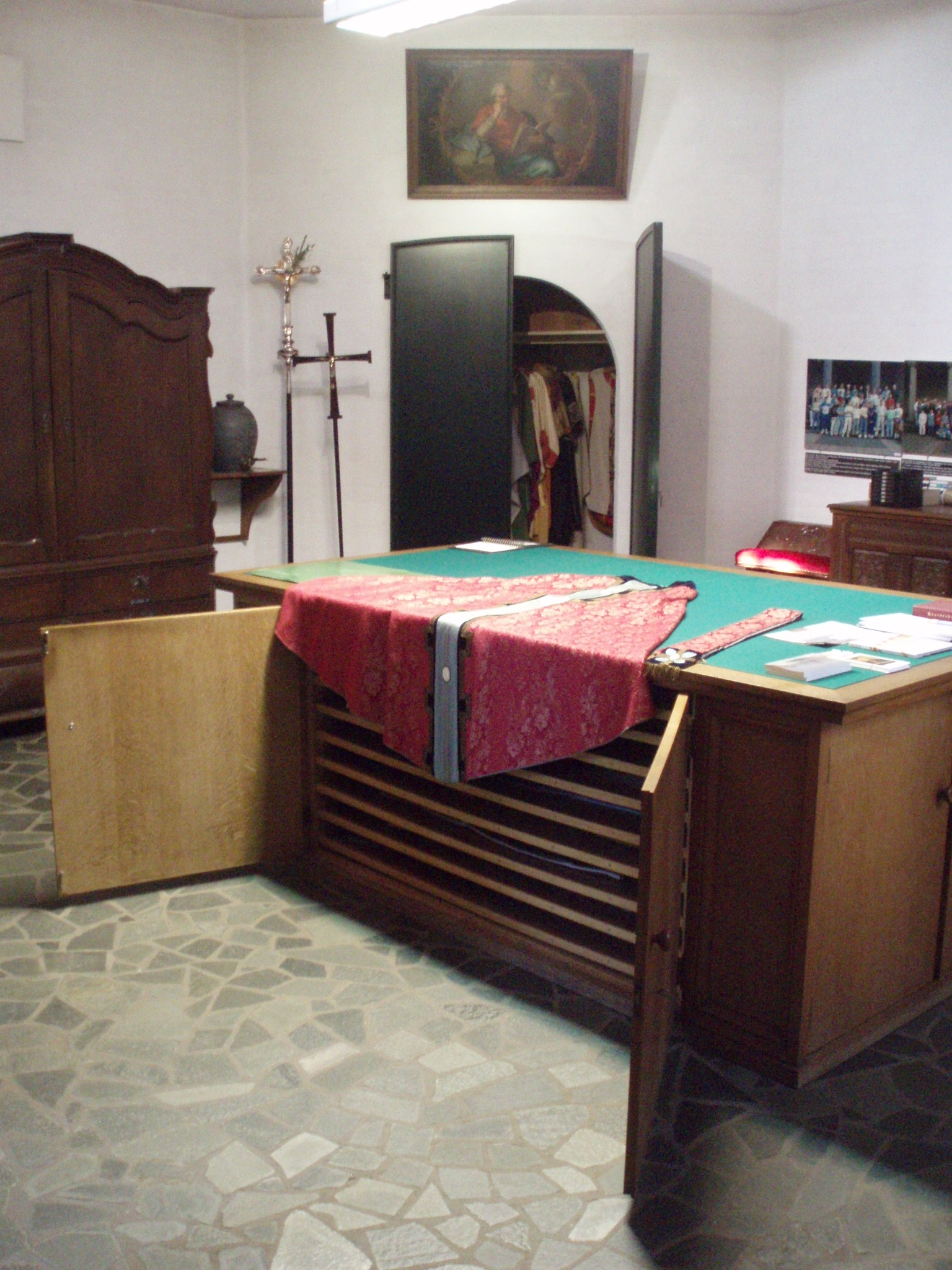
Sacristy with a sacristy credens (a cabinet with wide and very shallow drawers in which vestments and hangings are stored). A chasuble and stole are laid out on top of it, ready to be put on.

A sacristy, also known as a vestry or preparation room, is a room in Christian churches for the keeping of vestments (such as the alb and chasuble) and other church furnishings, sacred vessels, and parish records.

The sacristy is usually located inside the church, but in some cases it is an annex or separate building (as in some monasteries). In most older churches, a sacristy is near a side altar, or more usually behind or on a side of the main altar.

In newer churches the sacristy is often in another location, such as near an entrance to the church.

== Description ==
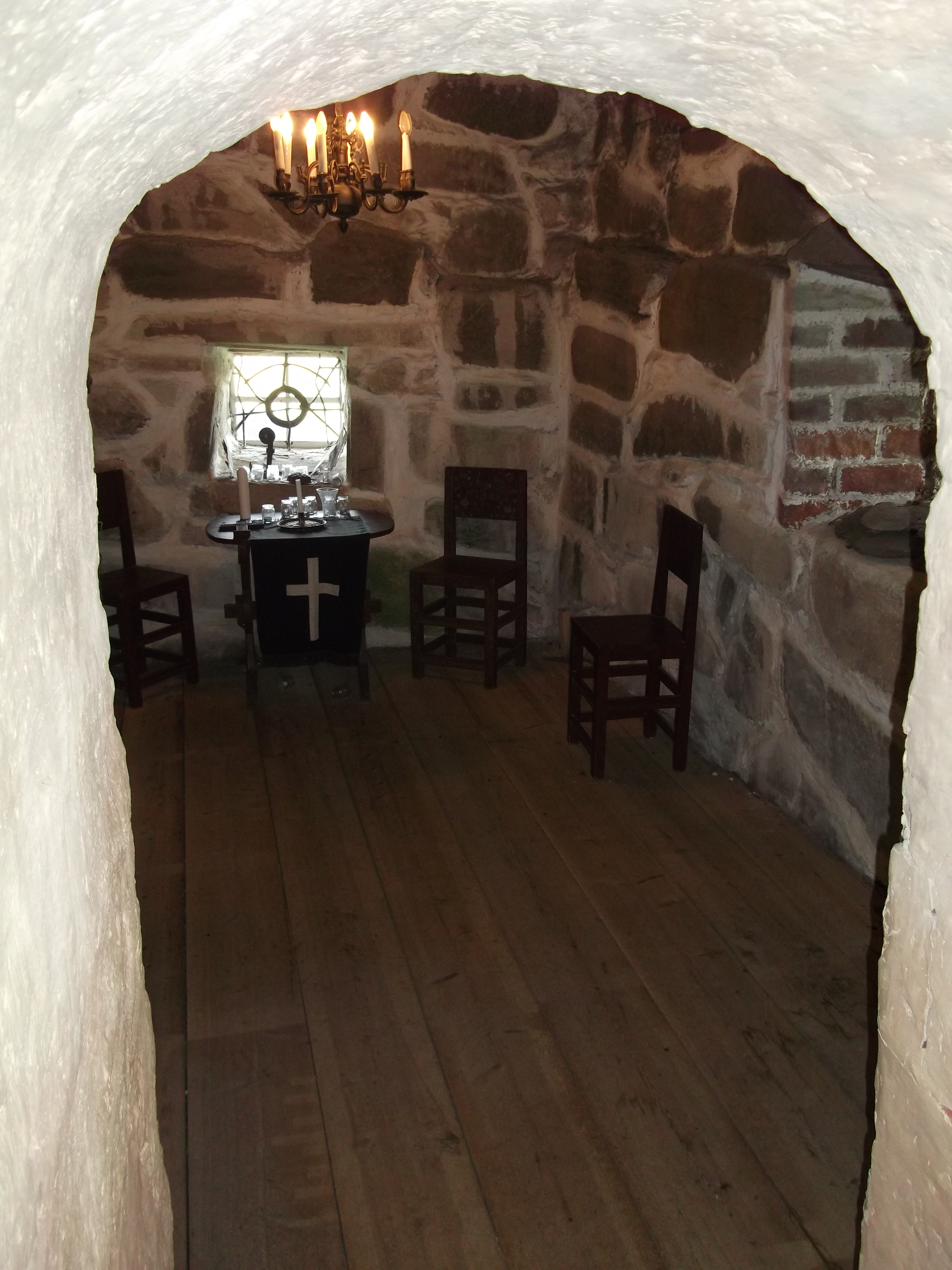
Interior of the sacristy at St. Michael Evangelical-Lutheran Church in Keminmaa, Finland

The sacristy is also where the priest and attendants vest and prepare before the service. They will return there at the end of the service to remove their vestments and put away any of the vessels used during the service. The hangings and altar linens are stored there as well. The parish registers may be kept in the sacristy and are administered by the parish clerk.

Sacristies usually contain a special wash basin, called a piscina, the drain of which is properly called a "sacrarium" in which the drain flows directly into the ground to prevent sacred items such as used baptismal water from being washed into the sewers or septic tanks. The piscina is used to wash linens used during the celebration of the Mass and purificators used during Holy Communion. The cruets, chalice, ciborium, paten, altar linens and sometimes the Holy Oils are kept inside the sacristy. Sacristies are usually off limits to the general public. The word "sacristy" derives from the Latin sacristia, sometimes spelled sacrastia, which is in turn derived from sacrista ("sexton, sacristan"), from sacra ("holy").

A person in charge of the sacristy and its contents is called a sacrist or a sacristan. The latter name was formerly given to the sexton of a parish church, where he would have cared for these things, the fabric of the building and the grounds.

In the Moravian Church, in addition to storing vestments and other vessels, the preparation room is where the Lovefeast is made ready for distribution to the congregation.

In Eastern Christianity, the functions of the sacristy are fulfilled by the Diaconicon and the Prothesis, two rooms or areas adjacent to the Holy Table (altar).

Some churches have more than one sacristy, each of which will have a specific function. Often additional sacristies are used for maintaining the church and its items, such as candles and other materials. Work on finding the so-called "lost medieval sacristy of Henry III" at Westminster Abbey during an episode of the archaeological television programme Time Team revealed that the abbey originally had two separate sacristies. As well as a conventional sacristy for storage of ceremonial vessels such as the chalice and paten, the second, described in a 15th-century document as the "galilee of the sacristy" was determined to have been used for the robing and formation of the procession. Work is planned to rebuild the demolished processional sacristy as an entry route for tourists and visitors to Westminster Abbey. St Nicholas Church in Bradfield, near Sheffield, has a sunken vestry which could be used by visiting clergy who needed to stay overnight during inclement weather.

== Gallery ==
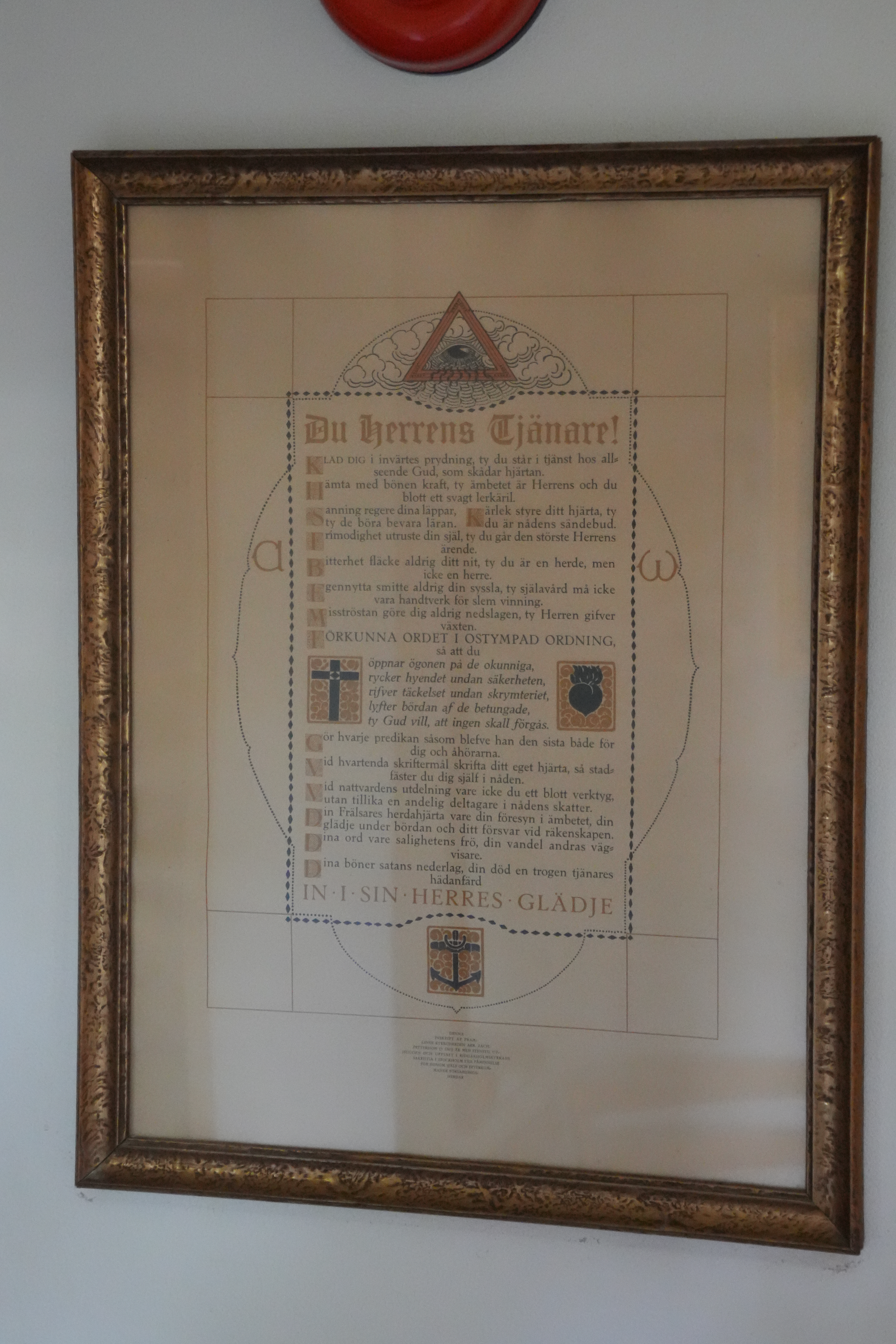
Vesting prayers hanging in the sacristy of Norrtälje Church (Evangelical-Lutheran) in Norrtälje, Sweden

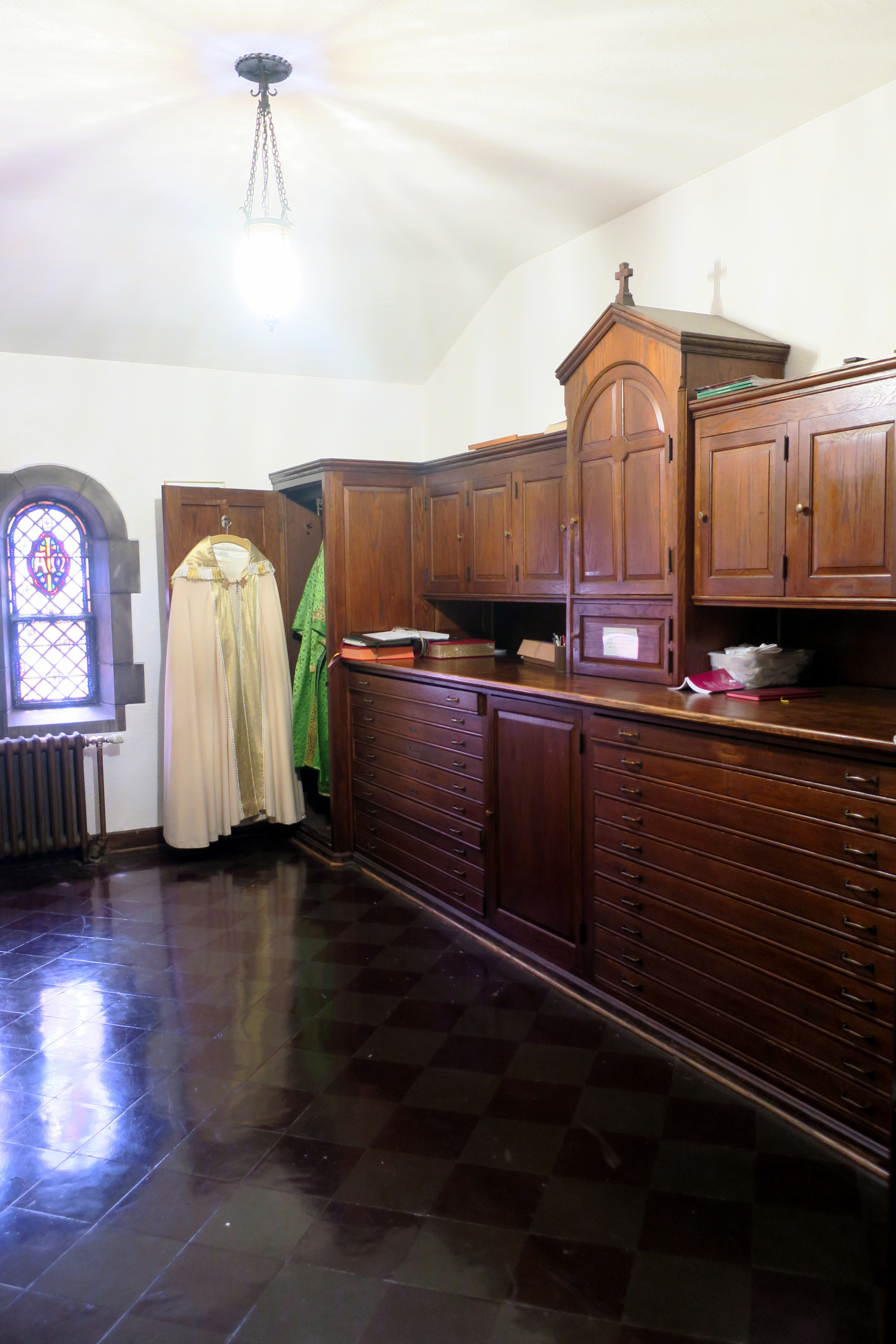
The sacristy of St. Therese Retreat Center in Columbus, Ohio (USA)

== See also ==
- Altar cloth
- Antependium
- Sacristan
- Savilahti Stone Sacristy
- Sexton
- Vestry
