= Bettina Streussel =

German canoe sprinter

Medal record

Women's canoe sprint

World Championships
Gold medal – first place	1982 Belgrade	K-2 500 m
Gold medal – first place	1982 Belgrade	K-4 500 m

Bettina Streussel is an East German canoe sprinter who competed in the early 1980s. She won two gold medals at the 1982 ICF Canoe Sprint World Championships in Belgrade, earning them in the K-2 500 m and K-4 500 m events.
