= Savilahti Stone Sacristy =

Church building in Mikkeli, Finland

Coordinates: 61°41′42″N 27°16′44″E

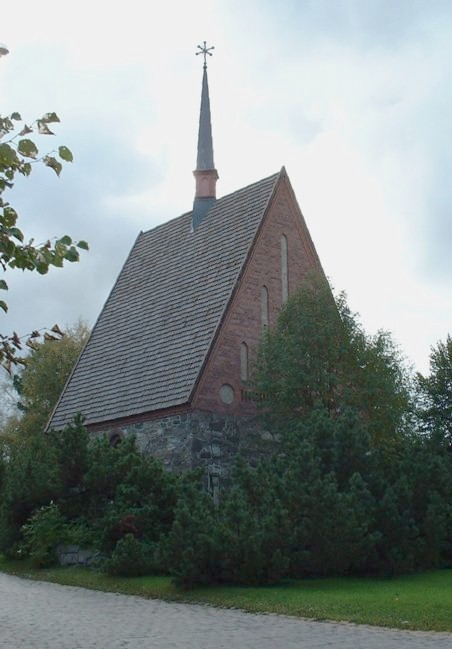
The Stone Sacristy

The Savilahti Stone Sacristy (Finnish: Savilahden kivisakasti) is located on Porrassalmenkatu in Savilahti, Mikkeli, Finland and serves as the sacristy of the old church, which was preserved when the church was destroyed. The walls of the original building, which once had log end triangles and a flat wooden roof as an extension, have been preserved.

It is considered one of Savonia's oldest buildings and one of the most famous symbols of Mikkeli. The exact date of its construction is uncertain. The current façade of the sacristy is the result of renovations carried out in the 1930s.

In 1930, the town council funds to the museum association to convert the sacristy into an ecclesiastical museum. The following year, the sacristy was opened as a museum, showcasing a collection of ecclesiastical artefacts from Mikkeli and the surrounding regions.

== History ==
The sacristy was erected next to the old wooden church, most likely in the first half of the 16th century, between 1520 and 1560. It was initially intended as the first step in building a stone church. However, the plan was abandoned after the crown confiscated the funds intended for it from the parish.

The new wooden church was built in 1664, although its wood material was felled, according to wood grain studies from the Lenius estate church stable, in the winter of 1661–1662. By the beginning of the 18th century, the church had deteriorated significantly and had become too small for the congregation. As a result, a new church was built for the parish in the northeast corner of the present Kirkkopuisto in 1753–1754. However, this church burned down in 1806 after being struck by lightning.

The old church was no longer used as a burial place for nobles. In 1769, a decision was made at the trustees' meeting to dismantle the church. However, nothing was done until in 1776 it was decided to sell the church at auction. The purchaser of the wooden part of the church used the logs to erect the outbuildings of the nearby ranch.

The sacristy itself would also have been sold and dismantled as well, but no buyers were found, and it was left to decay. It was planned to destroy the sacristy in the 1850s, but that plan was abandoned and it was decided instead to repair the poor condition sacristy, and in 1853 repairs were made to it.

Thorough repairs were undertaken at the turn of the 19th and 20th centuries. In this case, the sacristy got its current appearance: a high tiled roof, a roof rider and decorative brick gables. The plans were drawn up by the architect Magnus Schjerfbeck.

According to the surviving information from 1440, the rectory was previously located on the north side of the church, but was later moved to the island south of the church. The church bells have been on a stand on the Bell Rock, located west of the actual church.

== Sources ==
- Savon historia, I osa, 2. p., Pirkko-Liisa Lehtosalo-Hilander, Kauko Pirinen, Kustannuskiila Oy, Kuopio, Savon Sanomain Kirjapaino Oy 1988
