= Rasmutis Višinskis =

Soviet sprint canoer (born 1957)

Rasmutis Višinskis (born 12 October 1957) is a Soviet sprint canoeist who competed in the early 1980s. At the 1980 Summer Olympics in Moscow, he was eliminated in the semifinals of the K-1 1000 m event.
