= Daniel Legras =

French sprint canoer (born 1957)

Daniel Legras (born 28 December 1957) is a French sprint canoeist.

== Career ==
Legras competed in the mid to late 1980s. Participating in two Summer Olympics, he earned his best finish of sixth in the K-2 500 m event at Los Angeles in 1984.
