= Ion Bîrlădeanu =

Romanian canoeist

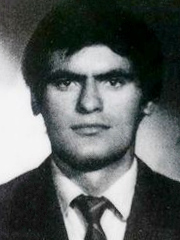

Personal information
- Born: 1 August 1958 (age 67) Cosmești, Galați, Romania
- Height: 187 cm (6 ft 2 in)
- Weight: 87 kg (192 lb)

Sport
- Sport: Canoe sprint
- Club: Dunarea; CSA Steaua București
Medal record
Representing Romania
Olympic Games
Bronze medal – third place	1980 Moscow	K-1 1000 m
World Championships
Silver medal – second place	1978 Belgrade	K-2 500 m
Silver medal – second place	1978 Belgrade	K-4 1000 m
Gold medal – first place	1979 Duisburg	K-2 10000 m
Silver medal – second place	1979 Duisburg	K-1 1000 m
Silver medal – second place	1981 Nottingham	K-1 500 m
Silver medal – second place	1981 Nottingham	K-1 1000 m
Bronze medal – third place	1981 Nottingham	K-2 10000 m

Ion Bîrlădeanu (born 1 August 1958) is a retired Romanian sprint kayaker. He won a bronze medal in the K-1 1000 m event at the 1980 Olympics, placing sixth in the doubles. He also won seven medals at the ICF Canoe Sprint World Championships with a gold (K-2 10000 m: 1979), five silvers (K-1 500 m: 1981, K-1 1000 m: 1979, 1981; K-2 500 m: 1978, K-4 1000 m: 1978), and one bronze (K-2 10000 m: 1981).

Bîrlădeanu spent most of his career with Steaua București, and after retiring from competitions worked as a coach there. Later he trained the national junior and senior teams, and in 2005 became president of the Romanian Canoe and Kayak Federation.
