= Luzius Philipp =

Swiss canoeist (born 1965)

Luzius Philipp (born 28 April 1965) is a Swiss sprint canoeist who competed in the late 1980s. At the 1988 Summer Olympics in Seoul, he advanced to the semifinals of the K-1 500 m event, but did not start.
