= Yekaterina Golubeva (canoeist) =

Soviet canoeist

Medal record

Women's canoe sprint

World Championships
Silver medal – second place	1982 Belgrade	K-4 500 m

Yekaterina Golubeva is a Soviet sprint canoer who competed in the early 1980s. She won a silver medal in the K-4 500 m event at the 1982 ICF Canoe Sprint World Championships in Belgrade.
