= Vladimir Parfenovich =

Soviet canoe racer

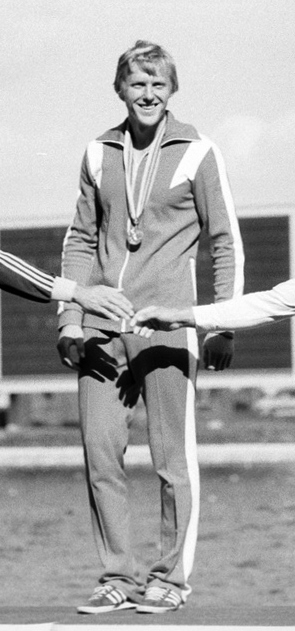
- Parfenovich at the 1980 Olympics

Personal information
- Born: 2 December 1958 (age 67) Minsk, Byelorussian SSR, Soviet Union
- Height: 192 cm (6 ft 4 in)
- Weight: 90 kg (198 lb)

Sport
- Sport: Canoe sprint
- Club: Krasnoye Znamya Minsk
Medal record
Representing the Soviet Union
Olympic Games
Gold medal – first place	1980 Moscow	K-1 500 m
Gold medal – first place	1980 Moscow	K-2 500 m
Gold medal – first place	1980 Moscow	K-2 1000 m
World Championships
Silver medal – second place	1978 Belgrade	K-1 500 m
Gold medal – first place	1979 Duisburg	K-1 500 m
Gold medal – first place	1979 Duisburg	K-2 500 m
Gold medal – first place	1981 Nottingham	K-1 500 m
Gold medal – first place	1981 Nottingham	K-2 500 m
Gold medal – first place	1981 Nottingham	K-2 1000 m
Gold medal – first place	1982 Belgrade	K-1 500 m
Gold medal – first place	1982 Belgrade	K-2 500 m
Gold medal – first place	1982 Belgrade	K-2 1000 m
Gold medal – first place	1983 Tampere	K-1 500 m
Silver medal – second place	1983 Tampere	K-2 500 m
Silver medal – second place	1983 Tampere	K-2 1000 m

Vladimir Vladimirovich Parfenovich (Belarusian: Уладзімір Парфяновіч; Russian: Владимир Владимирович Парфенович, Vladimir Parfenovich; born 2 December 1958) is a Belarusian retired sprint canoer and politician.

== Sport ==
Parfenovich competed for the Soviet Union at the Moscow Olympics and became the first canoer to win all three events he entered: K-1 500 m, K-2 500 m and K-2 1000 m. He also won twelve medals at the ICF Canoe Sprint World Championships, with nine golds (K-1 500 m: 1979, 1981–1983; K-2 500 m: 1979, 1981, 1982; K-2 1000 m: 1981, 1982) and three silvers (K-1 500 m: 1978, K-2 500 m: 1983, K-2 1000 m: 1983).

Parfenovich retired from competitions after learning that the 1984 will be boycotted by the Soviet Union. He then worked as an instructor for the Sport ministry of Belarus and served in the KGB and police forces. In 1995–2007 he headed the Canoe-Kayak Federation of Belarus and was a member of the Belarus Olympic Committee. After that he trained canoers in Russia, and in 2013 became head coach of the Russian team.

== Politics ==
In 2000, he entered politics and was elected to the National Assembly of the Republic of Belarus. He joined the parliamentary group Respublika that opposed the government of Alexander Lukashenko. On 3 June 2004, Parfenovich and two other members of parliament, general Valery Fralou and Siarhiej Skrabiec, started a hunger strike, arguing that the chair of the parliament did not give them the chance for debate and did not put to vote their proposed amendments to the election code. They stopped the strike on 21 June, when parliament voted against their proposals.
