= Francesco Uberti =

Italian canoeist (born 1962)

Medal record

Men's canoe sprint

World Championships
Bronze medal – third place	1985 Mechelen	K-2 10000 m

Francesco Uberti (born 15 January 1962) is an Italian sprint canoer who competed in the mid-1980s. He won a bronze medal in the K-2 10000 m event at the 1985 ICF Canoe Sprint World Championships in Mechelen.

Uberti also competed at the 1984 Summer Olympics in Los Angeles, finishing fourth in the K-2 500 m and sixth in the K-2 1000 m events.
