= Nicolae Feodosei =

Romanian sprint canoer

Personal information
- Born: 6 December 1962 (age 63) Slava Cercheză, Tulcea, Romania
- Height: 182 cm (6 ft 0 in)
- Weight: 82 kg (181 lb)
Medal record
Men's canoe sprint
Representing Romania
World Championships
Gold medal – first place	1983 Tampere	K-4 1000 m
Silver medal – second place	1986 Montreal	K-4 10000 m
Summer Universiade
Bronze medal – third place	1987 Zagreb	K-4 500 m
Bronze medal – third place	1987 Zagreb	K-4 1000 m

Nicolae Feodosei (born 6 December 1962) is a Romanian canoe sprinter who competed in the mid-1980s. He won two medals at the ICF Canoe Sprint World Championships with a gold (K-4 1000 m: 1983) and a silver (K-4 10000 m: 1986).

Feodosei also competed at the 1984 Summer Olympics in Los Angeles, finishing fourth in the K-4 1000 m and fifth in the K-2 500 m events.
