= Sainte-Colome =

- Commune
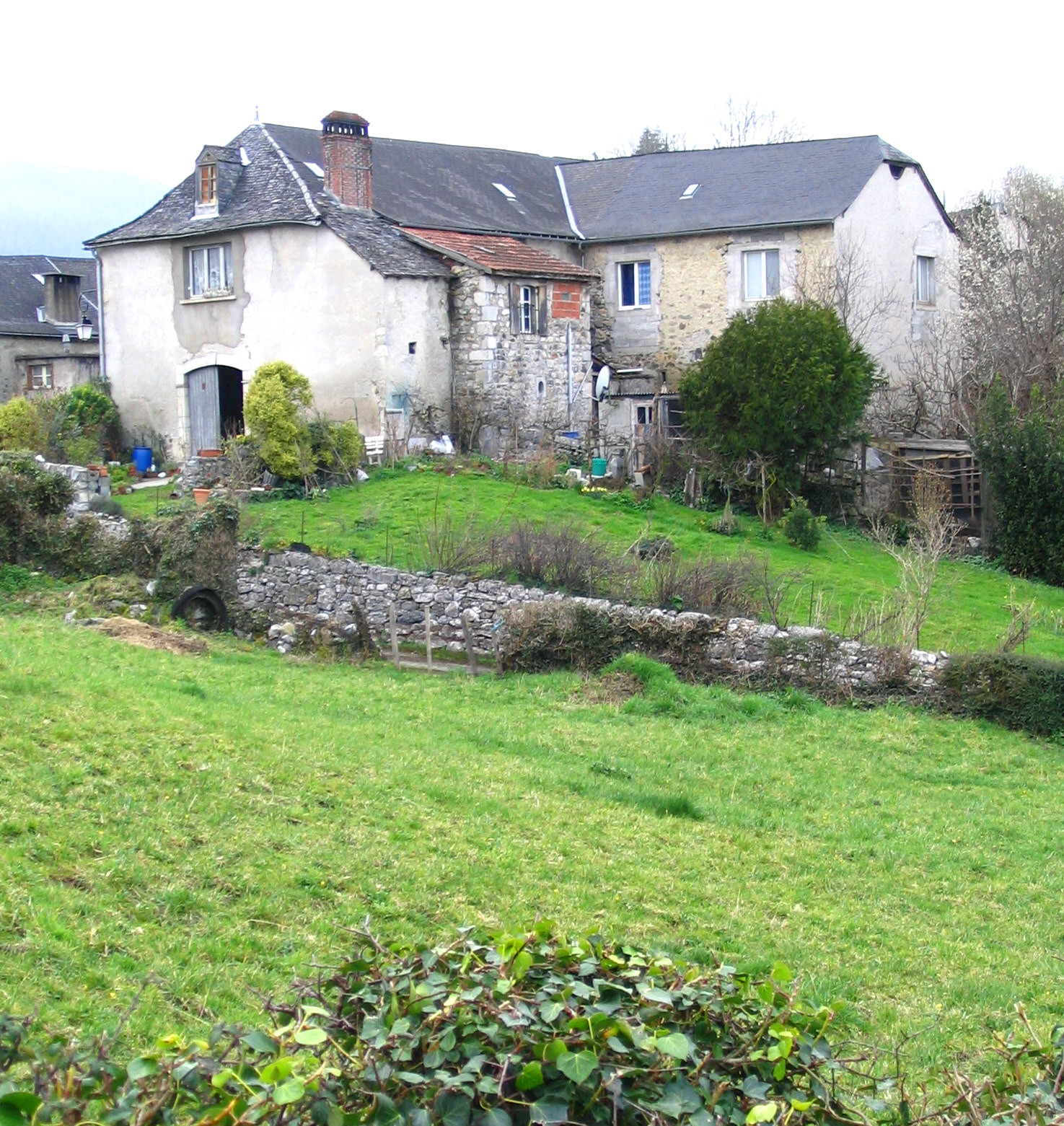
- A house in the commune
- Location of Sainte-Colome
- Location within France Location within Nouvelle-Aquitaine
- Coordinates: 43°06′11″N 0°24′04″W
- Country: France
- Region: Nouvelle-Aquitaine
- Department: Pyrénées-Atlantiques
- Arrondissement: Oloron-Sainte-Marie
- Canton: Oloron-Sainte-Marie-2

Government
  - Mayor (2020–2026): Jean-Pierre Garrocq
- Area^{1}: 9.35 km^{2} (3.61 sq mi)
- Elevation: 453 m (1,486 ft)
- Highest elevation: 618 m (2,028 ft)
- Lowest elevation: 347 m (1,138 ft)
- Population (2023): 354
  - Density: 37.9/km^{2} (98.1/sq mi)
- Time zone: UTC+01:00 (CET)
  - Summer (DST): UTC+02:00 (CEST)
- INSEE/Postal code: 64473 /64260
- ^{1} French Land Register data, which excludes lakes, ponds, glaciers > 1 km^{2} (0.386 sq mi or 247 acres) and river estuaries.

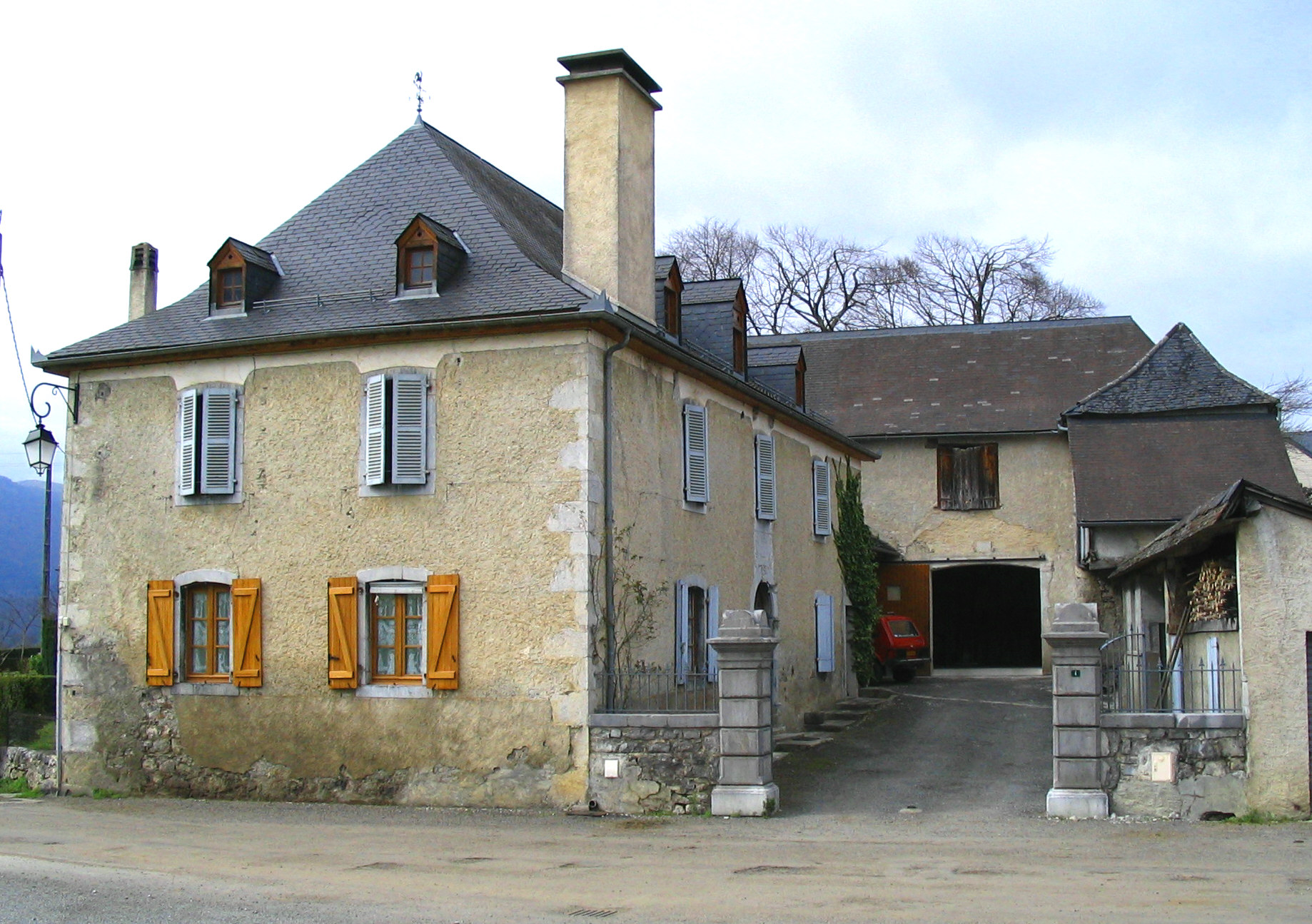

Sainte-Colome (French pronunciation: [sɛ̃t kɔlɔm]; Occitan: Senta Coloma) is a commune in the Pyrénées-Atlantiques department in south-western France.

== See also ==
- Ossau Valley
- Communes of the Pyrénées-Atlantiques department
