= David Halpern (canoeist) =

American sprint kayaker

David Halpern (born August 18, 1955) is an American sprint kayaker who competed in the 1980s. Halpern competed in the 1984 Summer Olympics in Los Angeles, placing tenth in the K-2 500 m.

During his competitive career he won over 50 medals in U.S. Nationals competition. After retiring from international competition, he earned his keep as a writer and cartoonist. Currently he works as a Ranger for Washington State Parks.
