= Jorge Colome =

Cuban sprint canoer (born 1958)

Jorge Colome Jaime (born February 16, 1958) is a Cuban sprint canoer who competed in the early 1980s. At the 1980 Summer Olympics in Moscow, he was eliminated in the repechages of the K-1 500 m and the K-1 1000 m events.
