= Oliver Seack =

German canoeist

Medal record

Men's canoe sprint

World Championships
Silver medal – second place	1985 Mechelen	K-1 500 m
Bronze medal – third place	1981 Nottingham	K-4 1000 m
Bronze medal – third place	1982 Belgrade	K-2 500 m
Bronze medal – third place	1982 Belgrade	K-4 1000 m

Oliver Seack (born 28 July 1962) is a West German sprint canoer who competed in the early to mid-1980s. He won four medals at the ICF Canoe Sprint World Championships with a silver (K-1 500 m: 1985) and three bronzes (K-2 500 m: 1982, K-4 1000 m: 1981, 1982).

Seack also competed at the 1984 Summer Olympics in Los Angeles, finishing fifth in the K-2 1000 m and seventh in the K-2 500 m events.
