= Jan Raciborski =

British canoeist

Jan Raciborski (born 23 July 1961 in Totnes) is a British canoe sprinter who competed in the mid to late 1980s. At the 1984 Summer Olympics in Los Angeles, he was eliminated in the semifinals of the K-2 1000 m event. Four years later in Seoul, Raciborski was eliminated in the repechages of the K-4 1000 m event.
