= Edwin Richards (canoeist) =

New Zealand canoeist (born 1957)

Edwin Richards (born 15 June 1957 in Christchurch) is a New Zealand canoe sprinter who competed in the mid-1980s. At the 1984 Summer Olympics in Los Angeles, he was eliminated in the semifinals of the K-2 1000 m event.
