= Shen Yongjin =

Chinese former male sprint canoeist (born 1960)

Personal information
- Native name: 沈勇进
- Nationality: Chinese
- Born: 6 May 1960 (age 65); Wuhan, Hubei
- Height: 1.82 m (6 ft 0 in)
- Weight: 76 kg (168 lb)

Sport
- Country: China
- Sport: Canoe sprint

Shen Yongjin (Chinese: 沈勇进; born May 6, 1960) is a Chinese former male sprint canoeist who competed in the mid-1980s. At the 1984 Summer Olympics in Los Angeles, he was eliminated in the repechages of the K-2 500 m event.

Shen was born in Wuhan, after his retirement of a competing canoe sporter, He serves as a Senior Coach, the men's kayak coach in the Water Sports Administration Center of Hubei.
