= Patrick Hanssens =

Belgian canoeist

Patrick Hanssens (Antwerp, 6 June 1956) is a Belgian canoe sprinter who competed in the mid-1980s. At the 1984 Summer Olympics in Los Angeles, he finished ninth in the K-2 1000 m event while being eliminated in the semifinals of the K-2 500 m event.
