= Christopher Canham =

British sprint canoer

Medal record

Men's canoe sprint

World Championships
Bronze medal – third place	1981 Nottingham	K-4 10000 m

Christopher Canham (born 3 August 1962) is a British canoe sprinter who competed in the early to mid-1980s. He won a bronze medal in the K-4 10000 m event at the 1981 ICF Canoe Sprint World Championships in Nottingham.

Canham also competed at the 1984 Summer Olympics in Los Angeles in the K-2 1000 m event, but was eliminated in the semifinals.
