= Hisao Yanagisawa =

Japanese canoeist

Hisao Yanagisawa (柳沢 尚久, Yanagisawa Hisao; born May 7, 1957) is a Japanese sprint canoer who competed in the mid-1980s. He was eliminated in the repechages in both the K-2 500 m and the K-2 1000 m events at the 1984 Summer Olympics in Los Angeles.
