= Mika Savilahti =

Finnish canoeist

Mika Pekka Savilahti (born 31 March 1963 in Tampere) is a Finnish sprint canoeist who competed in the mid-1980s. He was eliminated in the semifinals in both the K-2 500 m and the K-4 1000 m events at the 1984 Summer Olympics in Los Angeles.
