= Arthur Canham =

South African diplomat

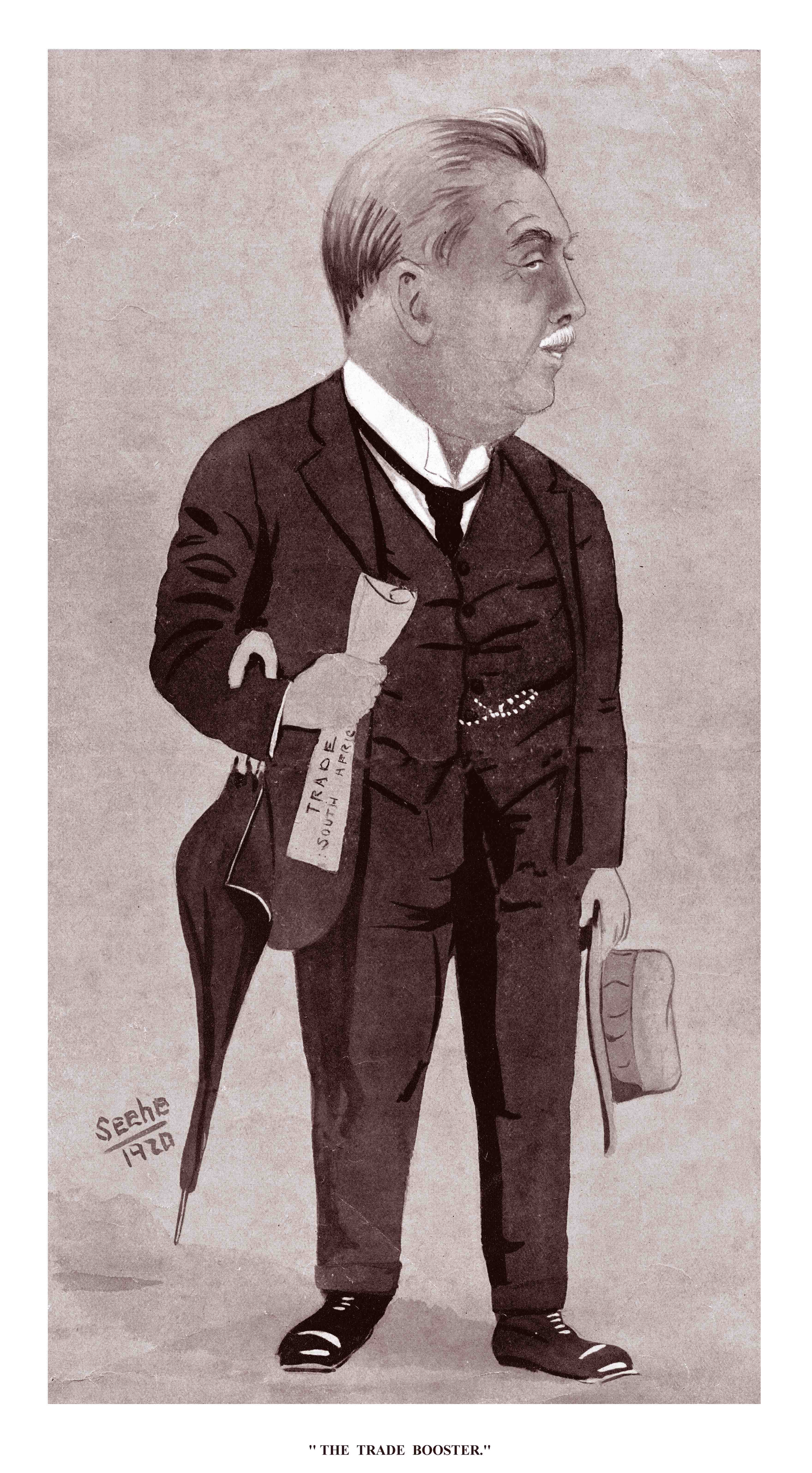
Arthur Canham, 'The Trade Booster'.

Arthur Canham (1867–1933) was South Africa's first Trade Commissioner. He was born in Crowland, Lincolnshire, England and emigrated to Natal in 1901 where he joined the Civil Service as a shorthand writer at the Supreme Court in Pietermaritzburg. He then served successively in the Natal Government Railways and the Prime Minister's office.

After the foundation of the Union of South Africa in 1910, Canham transferred to the new Department of Commerce and Industry. Following a period as Acting Trade Commissioner, he was appointed the Union's first Trade Commissioner in 1918. From his base in the South African High Commission in London, he achieved considerable success in establishing overseas outlets for South African exports.

Arthur Canham died in Kingston-upon-Thames, England in 1933 aged 65.
