= Yong-jin =

- Hangul: 용진
- RR: Yongjin
- MR: Yongjin

Yong-jin, also spelled Ryong-jin, is a Korean given name. People with this name include:

== Entertainers ==
- Kim Yong Jin (born 1982), member of South Korean pop band Bohemian
- Lee Yong-jin (born 1985), South Korean comedian and singer

== Sportspeople ==
- Choi Yong-jin (athlete), South Korean Paralympic athlete
- Choi Yong-jin (speed skater) (born 1922), South Korean speed skater

== Other ==
- Choe Yong-jin (1911–1998), North Korean politician
- Chung Yong-jin (born 1968), South Korean business executive
- Kim Yong-jin (politician) (1953–2016), North Korean politician
- Park Yong-jin (born 1971), South Korean politician

== See also ==
- Kwon Yong-jin (권영진), North Korean politician and military officer
- Young-jin
- List of Korean given names
