= John Sumegi =

Australian flatwater canoeist

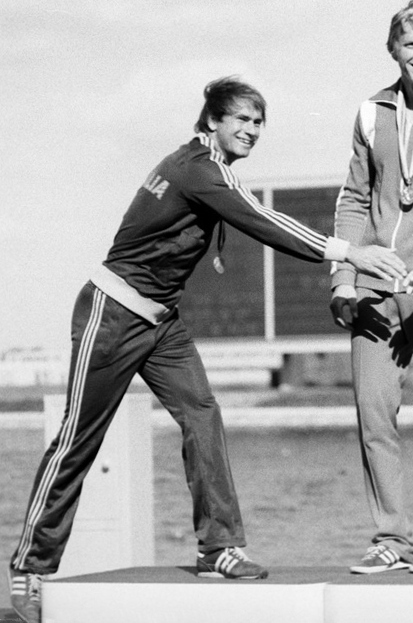
- Sumegi at the 1980 Olympics

Personal information
- Full name: John Zoltan Sumegi
- Born: 27 October 1954 (age 72) Orange, New South Wales, Australia
- Height: 182 cm (6 ft 0 in)
- Weight: 86 kg (190 lb)

Sport
- Sport: Canoe sprint
Medal record
Representing Australia
Olympic Games
Silver medal – second place	1980 Moscow	K-1 500 m
World Championships
Silver medal – second place	1979 Duisburg	K-1 500 m

John Zoltan Sumegi (born 27 October 1954) is a retired Australian K-1 500 m flatwater canoeist who competed at the 1976 Summer Olympics, won a silver medal at the 1979 ICF Canoe Sprint World Championships and another at the 1980 Summer Olympics.
