= Geert Deldaele =

Belgian sprint canoer

Geert Deldaele (Zwevegem, 18 March 1964) is a Belgian canoe sprinter who competed in the late 1980s. At the 1988 Summer Olympics in Seoul, he was eliminated in the semifinals of the K-1 500 m event.
