= Kazumori Koike =

Japanese canoeist

Kazumori Koike (小池 一守, Koike Kazumori; born October 20, 1958) is a Japanese sprint canoer who competed in the mid-1980s. He was eliminated in the repechages in both the K-2 500 m and the K-2 1000 m events at the 1984 Summer Olympics in Los Angeles.
