= Theo Classens =

Belgian canoeist

Theófhiel "Theo" Classens (born 18 December 1948) is a Belgian canoe sprinter who competed in the late 1970s and early 1980s. He was eliminated in the semifinals of the K-1 1000 m event at the 1976 Summer Olympics in Montreal. Four years later in Moscow, Classens was eliminated in the semifinals of the K-1 500 m and the repechages of the K-1 1000 m events.
