= Patrick Lefoulon =

French canoeist (born 1958)

Medal record

Men's canoe sprint

Olympic Games
| Silver medal – second place | 1984 Los Angeles | K-2 1000 m |

World Championships
| Gold medal – first place | 1982 Belgrade | K-2 10000 m |

Patrick Lefoulon (born 6 May 1958) is a French sprint canoeist who competed in the early 1980s. Competing in two Summer Olympics, he won a silver medal in the K-2 1000 m event at Los Angeles in 1984. He also won a gold in the K-2 10000 m event at the 1982 ICF Canoe Sprint World Championships in Belgrade. At the 1984 Summer Olympics in Los Angeles, he was runner-up to Bernard Brégeon in the 1000 m double canoe.
