= Werner Bachmayer =

Austrian sprint canoer

Medal record

Men's canoe sprint

World Championships
| Bronze medal – third place | 1983 Tampere | K-2 1000 m |

Werner Bachmayer (Vienna, 6 December 1960) is an Austrian sprint canoeist who competed in the early 1980s. He won a bronze medal in the K-2 1000 m event at the 1983 ICF Canoe Sprint World Championships in Tampere.

Bachmayer also competed in two Summer Olympics, earning his best finish of ninth in the K-2 500 m event at Los Angeles in 1984.
