= Martin Ralph (canoeist) =

Australian canoeist

Martin Ralph (born 18 January 1960) is an Australian sprint canoeist who competed in the mid-1980s.

== Career ==
At the 1984 Summer Olympics in Los Angeles, he was eliminated in the repechages of the K-2 500 m event. Subsequently, he began to coach with the VIS (Victorian Institute of Sport) and independently. Martin received the Australian Sports Medal from the Prime Minister and the Governor General for sporting achievement in the year 2000. Often asked if he won a gold medal Martin replies, "I didn't come first and I didn't come last but I got a real good look at the bloke who did!"

As a publicity stunt, Martin busked in the City of Melbourne to raise sporting funds to represent Australia. Within 10 days of street performing, "the hat was full" and Martin was on his way to the World Championships. Little did he know that this was to lead to a new career. In 1987 he retired from competition and started working full-time in the contemporary comedy rooms of Melbourne and Sydney alongside his coaching role with the Victorian Institute of Sport.

Since 1987, he has worked as a comedian, master of ceremonies and motivational speaker, specializing in stand-up comedy routines based around things that spin. He performed cowboy-style spinning rope routines, unicycle feats and yoyo routines, using traditional yoyos, high-tech yoyos and the manipulation of a yoyo that was not attached to any string.

During the 1990s and beyond, Martin spent years developing and building his own props including two of the largest spinning tops in the world. The largest spinning top was nearly one meter high, powered up to a speed of 2200 rpm using an electric drill, with over 60 small led globes installed in the top to emit a light display. As an inventor, Martin designed and built a gyroscope that self propels along a string set up to run safely through or over the audience.

Based in Riddells Creek, Martin has created a private museum featuring a number of unique and collectable yoyos and spinning tops in Australia.
