= Wolfgang Hartl =

Austrian canoeist

Medal record

Men's canoe sprint

World Championships
Bronze medal – third place	1983 Tampere	K-2 1000 m

Wolfgang Hartl (Linz, 2 February 1961) is an Austrian sprint canoeist who competed in the early 1980s. He won a bronze medal in the K-2 1000 m event at the 1983 ICF Canoe Sprint World Championships in Tampere.

Hartl also competed in two Summer Olympics, earning his best finish of ninth in the K-2 500 m event at Los Angeles in 1984.
