= Lee Young-jin (footballer, born 1972) =

South Korean footballer

Personal information
- Date of birth: March 27, 1972 (age 54)
- Place of birth: South Korea
- Height: 1.80 m (5 ft 11 in)
- Position: Defender

Team information
- Current team: Seongnam FC

Youth career
- Daegu University

Senior career*
Years	Team	Apps	(Gls)
1994–2004	Ilhwa / Cheonan Ilhwa; Seongnam Ilhwa	111	(2)
1997–1998	→ Sangmu (Military service)	?	(?)
2007–2008	Yongin Citizen FC	?	(?)

International career^{‡}
1995–1996	Korea Republic	9	(1)

Managerial career
- 2005–2006: Wonsam Middle School (Coach)
- 2007–2008: Wonsam Middle School (Coach)
- 2008: Baegam High School (Coach)
- 2009–2012: Seongnam Ilhwa Chunma (Coach)
- 2013: FC Seoul (Assistant manager)
- 2014–: Seongnam FC (Coach)
- 2014–: Seongnam FC (Caretaker manager)
- * Club domestic league appearances and goals as of 26 August 2014 ‡ National team caps and goals as of 26 August 2014

- Lee Young-jin
- Hangul: 이영진
- RR: I Yeongjin
- MR: I Yŏngjin

Lee Young-jin (born March 27, 1972) is a retired South Korean football player. He was a participant at 1996 AFC Asian Cup in the U.A.E. After professional career, He was played at K3 (amateur) during 2007–2008.

He was appointed as assistant manager of FC Seoul in February 2013
