= Oreste Perri =

Italian sprint canoeist and politician

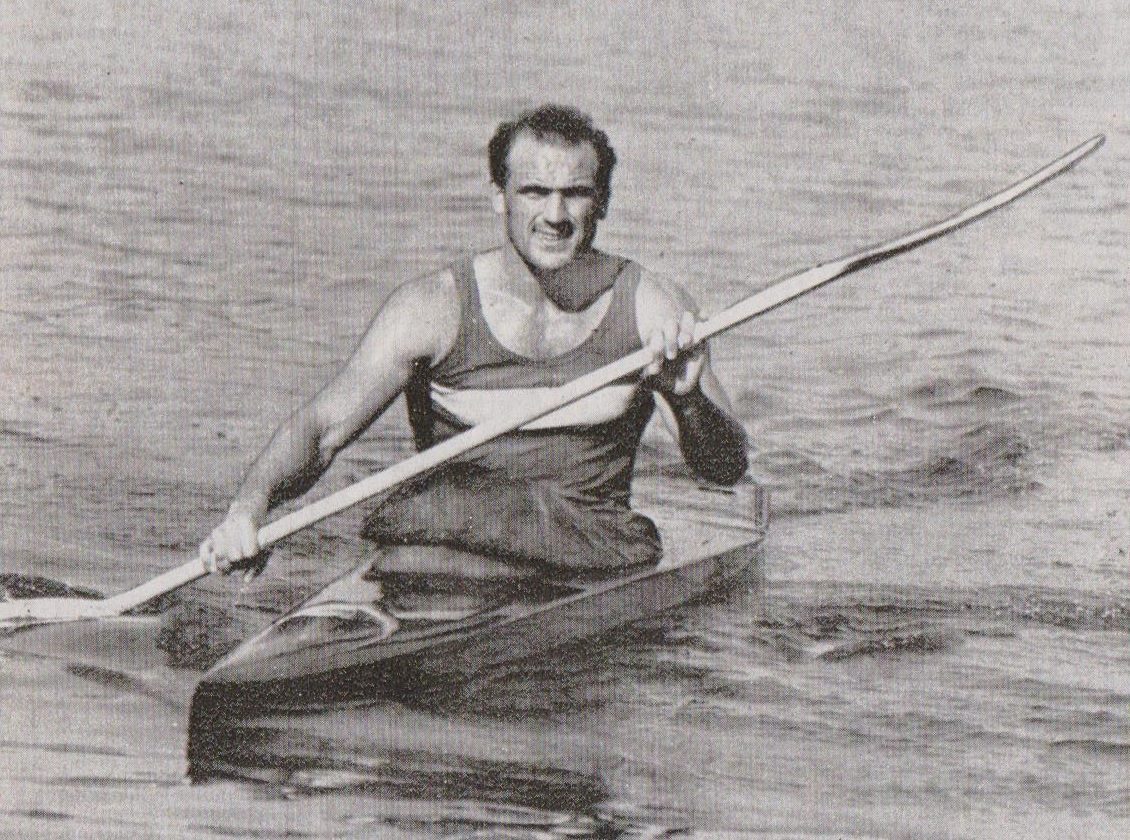
- Perri in 1974

Personal information
- Born: 27 June 1951 (age 75) Castelverde, Lombardy, Italy

Mayor of Cremona
- In office 23 June 2009 – 12 June 2014
- Preceded by: Gian Carlo Corada
- Succeeded by: Gianluca Galimberti

Personal details
- Party: The People of Freedom
Medal record
Men's canoe sprint
Representing Italy
World Championships
Gold medal – first place	1974 Mexico City	K-1 10000 m
Gold medal – first place	1975 Belgrade	K-1 1000 m
Gold medal – first place	1975 Belgrade	K-1 10000 m
Gold medal – first place	1977 Sofia	K-1 10000 m
Bronze medal – third place	1974 Mexico City	K-1 1000 m
Bronze medal – third place	1977 Sofia	K-1 1000 m

Oreste Perri (born 27 June 1951) is an Italian sprint canoeist (and later politician) who competed from the early 1970s to the early 1980s.

== Biography ==
Perri was born in Castelverde, in the province of Cremona. He won six medals at the ICF Canoe Sprint World Championships with four golds (K-1 1000 m: 1975 (tied with Poland's Grzegorz Śledziewski, K-1 10000 m: 1974, 1975, 1977) and two bronzes (K-1 1000 m: 1974, 1977).

Perri also competed in three Summer Olympics, earning his best finish of fourth twice (1972: K-4 1000 m, 1976: K-1 1000 m). On 22 June 2009, Perri was sworn in as mayor of Cremona, Italy.

Political offices
Preceded by Gian Carlo Corada	Mayor of Cremona; 2009-2014	Succeeded by Gianluca Galimberti
