= 1965 Canoe Sprint European Championships =

International canoeing and kayaking event

- Venue: Lake Snagov
- Location: Bucharest, Romania
- Start date: 13 August 1965
- End date: 15 August 1965

The 1965 Canoe Sprint European Championships were held in Bucharest, Romania from 13 to 15 August 1965. This was the 8th edition of the event. The men's competition consisted of four canoe and nine kayak events. Three events were held for women, all in kayak.

== Medal overview ==
=== Men's ===
==== Canoe ====
Event	Gold	Time	Silver	Time	Bronze	Time
C-1 1000 m	Detlef Lewe (FRG)	4:21,68	Igor Lipalit (ROU)	4:24,92	Jürgen Eschert (GDR)	4:26,91
C-1 10000 m	Andrei Igorov (ROU)	52:58,10	Mikhail Zamotin (URS)	53:04,41	Herbert Koschnik (FRG)	53:23,21
C-2 1000 m	Soviet Union; Stepan Oshchepkov; Andrey Khimich	3:59,53	Soviet Union; Vitaly Galkov; Mikhail Zamotin	4:03,44	Denmark; John Sørensen; Peer Nielsen	4:04,71
C-2 10000 m	Soviet Union; Valeriy Drybas; Andrey Khimich	48:42,50	Romania; Simion Ismailciuc; Achim Sidorov	49:07,50	Romania; Serghei Covaliov; Lavrente Calinov	49:15,46

==== Kayak ====
Event	Gold	Time	Silver	Time	Bronze	Time
K-1 500 m	Aurel Vernescu (ROU)	1:51,32	Dieter Krause (GDR)	1:52,41	Rolf Peterson (SWE)	1:52,61
K-1 1000 m	Erik Hansen (DEN)	3:51,08	Imre Kemecsey (HUN)	3:53,61	Imre Szöllősi (HUN)	3:54,21
K-1 10000 m	László Ürögi (HUN)	47:07,88	Mihály Hesz (HUN)	47:13,59	Avery Matkava (URS)	47:17,00
K-1 4 x 500 m relay	Romania; Aurel Vernescu; Vasilie Nicoară; Haralambie Ivanov; Atanase Sciotnic	7:36,08	East Germany; Dieter Krause; Uwe Will; Friedhelm Wentzke; Jürgen Seibt	7:38,46	Hungary; György Mészáros; András Szente; László Kovács; Mihály Hesz	7:38,83
K-2 500 m	Romania; Vasilie Nicoară; Haralambie Ivanov	1:42,20	Soviet Union; Vladimir Obraztsov; Georgiy Karyukhin	1:44,30	Hungary; András Szente; György Mészáros	1:44,35
K-2 1000 m	Romania; Vasilie Nicoară; Haralambie Ivanov	3:30,35	Romania; Aurel Vernescu; Atanase Sciotnic	3:31,29	Hungary; Imre Szöllősi; László Fábián	3:32,01
K-2 10000 m	Hungary; Imre Szöllősi; László Fábián	42:46,04	Hungary; Csaba Giczy; Zoltan Novotny	43:37,35	East Germany; Edmond Frenzel; Peter Ebeling	43:50,38
K-4 1000 m	Romania; Vasilie Nicoară; Haralambie Ivanov; Andrei Conţolenco; Nicolae Terente	3:17,20	Romania; Aurel Vernescu; Atanase Sciotnic; Mihai Țurcaș; Miron Husarenko	3:17,70	West Germany; Bernhard Schulze; Ernst Blasek; Erich Kemnitz; Erich Suhrbier	3:18,60
K-4 10000 m	East Germany; Günter Holzvoigt; Siegwart Karbe; Wolfgang Finger; Wolfgang Niedrig	38:47,67	Soviet Union; Igor Pisarev; Ibragim Khasanov; Avery Matkava; Konstantin Nazarov	38:50,99	Soviet Union; Nikolai Chuzhikov; Anatoli Grishin; Vladimir Morozov; Vyacheslav Ionov	39:15,35

=== Women's ===
==== Kayak ====
Event	Gold	Time	Silver	Time	Bronze	Time
K-1 500 m	Lyudmila Khvedosyuk (URS)	2:13,99	Antonina Seredina (URS)	2:15,00	Renate Breuer (FRG)	2:18,15
K-2 500 m	Soviet Union; Antonina Seredina; Mariya Shubina	1:54,86	Soviet Union; Lyudmila Khvedosyuk; Nadezhda Levchenko	1:55,07	West Germany; Elke Felten; Roswitha Esser	1:55,27
K-4 500 m	Soviet Union; Mariya Shubina; Antonina Seredina; Lyudmila Khvedosyuk; Nadezhda Levchenko	1:44,03	Poland; Izabella Antonowicz; Jadwiga Doering; Stanisława Szydłowska; Agnieszka Wyszynska	1:46,04	West Germany; Elke Felten; Roswitha Esser; Irene Pepinghege; Renate Breuer	1:46,80

== Medals table ==
Rank	Nation	Gold	Silver	Bronze	Total
1	Romania (ROU)	6	4	1	11
2	Soviet Union (URS)	5	6	2	13
3	Hungary (HUN)	2	3	4	9
4	East Germany (GDR)	1	2	2	5
5	West Germany (FRG)	1	0	5	6
6	Denmark (DEN)	1	0	1	2
7	Poland (POL)	0	1	0	1
8	Sweden (SWE)	0	0	1	1
Totals (8 entries)		16	16	16	48
