= 1967 Canoe Sprint European Championships =

International canoeing and kayaking event

- Location: Duisburg, West Germany
- Start date: 25 August 1967
- End date: 27 August 1967

The 1967 Canoe Sprint European Championships were held in Duisburg, West Germany from 25 to 27 August 1967. This was the 9th edition of the event. The men's competition consisted of four canoe and nine kayak events. Three events were held for women, all in kayak.

== Medal overview ==
=== Men's ===
==== Canoe ====
Event	Gold	Time	Silver	Time	Bronze	Time
C-1 1000 m	Detlef Lewe (FRG)	4:21,06	Tamas Wichmann (HUN)	4:22,53	Jiří Čtvrtečka (TCH)	4:22,87
C-1 10000 m	Andrei Igorov (ROU)	51:23,40	Rudolf Pěnkava (TCH)	51:36,60	Naum Prokupets (URS)	51:50,40
C-2 1000 m	Hungary; Tamás Wichmann; Gyula Petrikovics	4:00,55	Romania; Constantin Manea; Procop Serghei	4:01,84	Soviet Union; Vasiliy Kalyagin; Valeriy Drybas	4:02,54
C-2 10000 m	Romania; Petre Maxim; Aurel Simionov	46:42,65	Soviet Union; Vasiliy Kalyagin; Valeriy Drybas	46:48,71	Sweden; Bernt Lindelöf; Erik Zeidlitz	46:49,71

==== Kayak ====
Event	Gold	Time	Silver	Time	Bronze	Time
K-1 500 m	Aurel Vernescu (ROU)	1:54,13	Rolf Peterson (SWE)	1:54,20	Anatoly Tishchenko (URS)	1:54,62
K-1 1000 m	Aleksandr Shaparenko (URS)	3:54,71	Erik Hansen (DEN)	3:55,81	Mihály Hesz (HUN)	3:56,13
K-1 10000 m	Konstantin Kostenko (URS)	45:33,10	Viktor Tsaryov (URS)	45:35,80	Egil Søby (NOR)	45:37,20
K-1 4 x 500 m relay	Romania; Mihai Țurcaș; Andrei Conţolenco; Haralambie Ivanov; Aurel Vernescu	7:33,57	West Germany; Bernd Guse; Hans Günther; Heinz Büker; Holger Zander	7:33,70	Soviet Union; Yuriy Kabanov; Georgiy Karyukhin; Anatoly Tishchenko; Vilnis Baltiņš	7:34,64
K-2 500 m	Soviet Union; Vladimir Obraztsov; Georgiy Karyukhin	1:42,80	Romania; Aurel Vernescu; Atanase Sciotnic	1:43,01	Romania; Andrei Conţolenco; Costel Coșniță	1:44,61
K-2 1000 m	Romania; Aurel Vernescu; Atanase Sciotnic	3:33,71	Sweden; Lars Andersson; Gunnar Utterberg	3:34,30	Hungary; Csaba Giczy; István Timár	3:34,37
K-2 10000 m	Hungary; Imre Kemecsey; László Fábián	42:13,60	Sweden; Lars Andersson; Gunnar Utterberg	42:19,27	Romania; Antrop Varabiev; Ion Terente	42:21,85
K-4 1000 m	Romania; Serghei Covaliov; Mihai Țurcaș; Anton Calenic; Ian Irimia	3:16,31	Soviet Union; Vladimir Morozov; Anatoli Grishin; Vyacheslav Ionov; Valeri Didenko	3:17,12	Soviet Union; Nikolai Chuzhikov; Yuri Stetsenko; Georgiy Karyukhin; Yuriy Kabanov	3:17,32
K-4 10000 m	Soviet Union; Vladimir Morozov; Anatoli Grishin; Vyacheslav Ionov; Valeri Didenko	36:45,51	Romania; Costel Coșniță; Haralambie Ivanov; Ion Terente; Anton Calenic	36:48,10	Austria; Günther Pfaff; Gerhard Seibold; Helmut Hediger; Kurt Lindlgruber	36:56,08

=== Women's ===
==== Kayak ====
Event	Gold	Time	Silver	Time	Bronze	Time
K-1 500 m	Lyudmila Pinayeva (URS)	2:09,43	Ivana Chalupova (TCH)	2:12,70	Antonina Seredina (URS)	2:12,71
K-2 500 m	Soviet Union; Lyudmila Pinayeva; Antonina Seredina	1:54,00	Romania; Viorica Dumitru; Valentina Serghei	1:54,80	West Germany; Roswitha Esser; Renate Breuer	1:54,82
K-4 500 m	Soviet Union; Lyudmila Pinayeva; Nadezhda Levchenko; Antonina Seredina; Mariya Shubina	1:43,91	West Germany; Roswitha Esser; Renate Breuer; Elke Felten; Sigrid Ritter	1:46,29	Soviet Union; Natalya Boyko; Galina Kiryanova; Adelaida Mishechkina; Lidiya Ivanova	1:46,78

== Medals table ==
Rank	Nation	Gold	Silver	Bronze	Total
1	Soviet Union (URS)	7	3	7	17
2	Romania (ROU)	6	4	2	12
3	Hungary (HUN)	2	1	2	5
4	West Germany (FRG)	1	2	1	4
5	Sweden (SWE)	0	3	1	4
6	Czechoslovakia (TCH)	0	2	1	3
7	Denmark (DEN)	0	1	0	1
8	Austria (AUT)	0	0	1	1
8	Norway (NOR)	0	0	1	1
Totals (9 entries)		16	16	16	48
