= Canoeing at the 1968 Summer Olympics =

Canoeing at the Games of the XIX Olympiad
- No. of events: 7

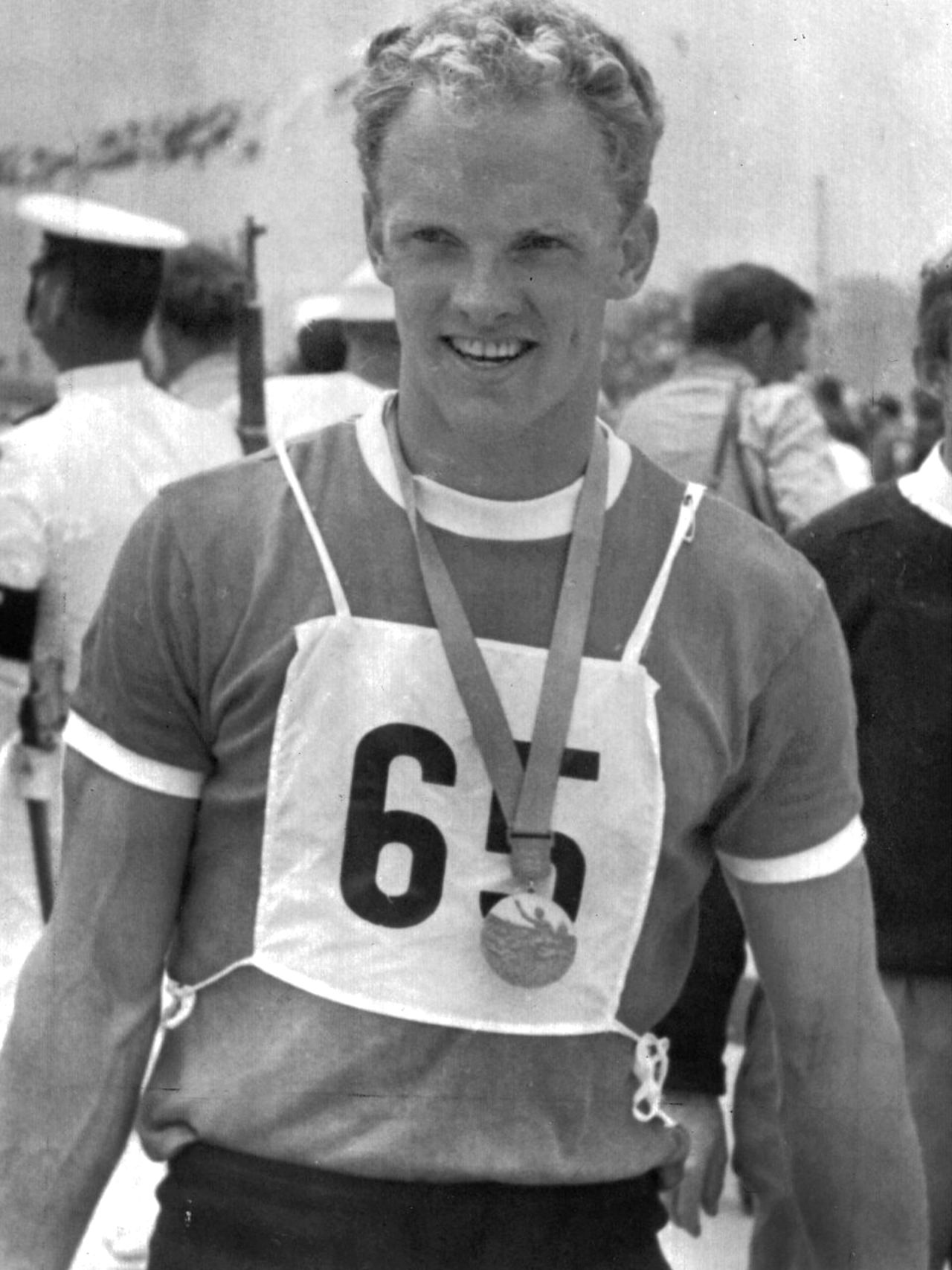
Erik Hansen at the 1968 Olympics

At the 1968 Summer Olympics in Mexico City, seven events in sprint canoe racing were contested. The program was unchanged from the previous Games in 1964. Lake Xochimilco was where the events took place.

== Medal table ==
Rank	Nation	Gold	Silver	Bronze	Total
1	Hungary	2	3	1	6
2	Soviet Union	2	1	3	6
3	West Germany	1	2	0	3
4	Romania	1	1	1	3
5	Norway	1	0	0	1
6	Austria	0	0	1	1
6	Denmark	0	0	1	1
Totals (7 entries)		7	7	7	21

== Medal summary ==
=== Men's events ===
Games	Gold	Silver	Bronze
C-1 1000 metres	Tibor Tatai; Hungary	Detlef Lewe; West Germany	Vitaly Galkov; Soviet Union
C-2 1000 metres	Ivan Patzaichin and Serghei Covaliov (ROU)	Tamás Wichmann and Gyula Petrikovics (HUN)	Naum Prokupets and Mikhail Zamotin (URS)
K-1 1000 metres	Mihály Hesz; Hungary	Aleksandr Shaparenko; Soviet Union	Erik Hansen; Denmark
K-2 1000 metres	Aleksandr Shaparenko and Vladimir Morozov (URS)	Csaba Giczy and István Timár (HUN)	Gerhard Siebold and Günther Pfaff (AUT)
K-4 1000 metres	Norway; Steinar Amundsen; Tore Berger; Egil Søby; Jan Johansen	Romania; Anton Calenic; Haralambie Ivanov; Dimitrie Ivanov; Mihai Țurcaș	Hungary; Csaba Giczy; Imre Szöllősi; István Timár; István Csizmadia

=== Women's events ===
Games	Gold	Silver	Bronze
K-1 500 metres	Lyudmila Pinayeva; Soviet Union	Renate Breuer; West Germany	Viorica Dumitru; Romania
K-2 500 metres	Annemarie Zimmermann and Roswitha Esser (FRG)	Anna Pfeffer and Katalin Rozsnyói (HUN)	Lyudmila Pinayeva and Antonina Seredina (URS)
