= Anita Nüßner =

Olympic canoeist (1935–2025)

Personal information
- Born: 10 June 1935 Plaue, Saxony, Germany
- Died: 27 February 2025 (aged 89)
- Height: 178 cm (5 ft 10 in)
- Weight: 69 kg (152 lb)

Sport
- Sport: Canoe sprint
- Club: Fortschritt Plaue (1958); Wissenschaft Jena (1959); SC DHfK Leipzig (1960 onwards)
Medal record
Women's canoe sprint
Representing East Germany
World Championships
Bronze medal – third place	1963 Jajce	K-4 500 m

Anita Nüßner (also spelled Nüssner and sometimes wrongly listed as Nüssner-Kobuss or Nüßner-Kobuß, 10 June 1935 – 27 February 2025) was an East German sprint canoeist who competed from the late-1950s until 1968. Nüßner won a K-4 500 m bronze medal at the 1963 ICF Canoe Sprint World Championships. She finished sixth in the K-1 500 m event at the 1968 Summer Olympics in Mexico City.

== Domestic competitions ==
Nüßner was born in 1935 in Plaue in Saxony, then an independent village but now a suburb of Flöha. (Note: Note that her Sports Reference entry wrongly identifies Plaue in Thuringia as her birth place.) She learned canoeing on the Zschopau that flows through Plaue. Standing 178 centimetres (70 in) tall and weighing 69 kilograms (152 lb) during her competitive career, she competed for Fortschritt Plaue in the 1958 East German canoe sprint championships. She came third in the K-1 500 m that year and second in the K-1 3000 m. By 1959, she had changed club and was competing for Wissenschaft Jena. She repeated her results from the previous year and came third in the K-1 500 m and second in the K-1 3000 m. For the 1960 season, Nüßner changed club again and from now on started for SC DHfK Leipzig. At a domestic regatta in Grünau on the Olympic course at Langer See, she won the K-2 500 m alongside Charlotte Seidelmann. At the August 1960 championships in Hoyerswerda, Nüßner came third in the K-1 500 m with Seidelmann taking the title. Seidelmann and Nüßner won the K-2 500 m and also the K-4 alongside Rasing und Tietze. At the July 1961 championships at Wusterwitzer See, Nüßner came second in the K-1 500 m with Seidelmann once again taking the title. Seidelmann and Nüßner won the K-2 500 m and also the K-4.

The 1962 national championships were held in mid-July at the Knappensee near Hoyerswerda. Seidelmann and Nüßner won the K-2 500 m and also the K-4. The 1963 national championships were held in September in Hoyerswerda. In the K-1 500 m, Seidelmann won her fifth title in a row with Nüßner coming third. Seidelmann and Nüßner won the K-2 500 m. In the K-4 500 m, the team from SC DHfK Leipzig lost the title to a crew from SC Potsdam. Nüßner did not compete at the 1964 national championships but concentrated on Olympic qualification races instead. At the 1965 national championships in Grünau, Nüßner was narrowly defeated by Anita Kobuß in the K-1 500 m and thus gained second place. The 1966 national championships were held in mid-July but Nüßner does not appear in the results lists. Nüßner returned for the 1967 national championships held in September and won the K-1 5000 m and the K-1 10,000 m marathon distance. At the 1968 national championships held in June on the Wusterwitzer See, Nüßner came second in the K-1 500 m beaten by Kobuß. In the K-4 500 m, Nüßner came third alongside teammates Damm, Kampfrath and Eggert from Leipzig.

== International competitions ==
In July 1960, Nüßner and Seidelmann won an international regatta at Langer See in the K-2 500 m. This counted towards the Olympic pre-qualification but only Seidelmann went to the final qualification regatta for the United Team of Germany and became a reserve for the K-2 500 m team of Therese Zenz and Ingrid Hartmann. At the 1961 international regatta in Grünau, Nüßner and Seidelmann won the K-2 500 m, beaten the favourites from Poland. In the K-1 500 m, Nüßner came first and Seidelmann was second. At the 1961 Canoe Sprint European Championships in Poznań, Poland, Nüßner and Seidelmann came fourth in the K-2 500 m. In December 1961, Nüßner was given a Master of Sport award. At an international regatta in Prague in August 1962, Nüßner came seventh in the K-1 500 m (Seidelmann came fifth) and in the K-2 500 m, Nüßner and Seidelmann came fourth.

At the 1963 ICF Canoe Sprint World Championships in Jajce, Yugoslavia, Nüßner and Seidelmann came fourth in the K-2 500 m. Alongside Marion Knobba and Helga Ulze, they won bronze with the K-4 500 m. In the 1964 season Nüßner teamed up with Charlotte Marquardt (née Seidelmann) for the K-2 500 m. At a regatta in Poznan, Marquardt and Nüßner came first. With 1964 an Olympic year, inner-German contests had to be held for the qualifications to the United Team of Germany. Marquardt and Nüßner caused a sensation when they beat the reigning champions, Annemarie Zimmermann and Roswitha Esser, at the first regatta held on the Mittelland Canal at the Rothensee boat lift. At the second Olympic qualifying regatta in Duisburg the East Germans could not repeat their performance and were beaten by both West German teams. Consequently, Zimmermann and Esser won the nomination and subsequently Olympic gold.

At an international regatta in Stockholm in June 1965, Nüßner won the K-1 500 m competition. A month later at a regatta in Copenhagen, Nüßner won both the K-1 500 m and 5000 m competitions. At the 1965 Canoe Sprint European Championships on Lake Snagov near Bucharest, Romania, Nüßner came sixth in the K-1 500 m competition. At an international regatta in Prague in September 1965, Nüßner came fifth in the K-1 500 m but won the K-2 500 m teamed up with Helga Ulze.

At an international regatta in Grünau in the 1968 Olympic year, Nüßner teamed up with Kobuß in the K2 but was replaced by Karin Haftenberger for the final. In August at a regatta in Moscow, Nüßner came third in the K-1 500 m. Nüßner was part of the 13-strong team nominated for the 1968 Summer Olympics in Mexico (12 of whom competed). In Mexico, Nüßner came fifth in her heat and had to qualify for the final in the repechage, where she came second. In the final, she came sixth.

Nüßner retired from active competition after the 1968 Olympics.

Nüßner died on 27 February 2025, at the age of 89.
