= Canoeing at the 1964 Summer Olympics =

Coordinates: 35.8031°N 139.6689°E

Canoeing at the Games of the XVIII Olympiad
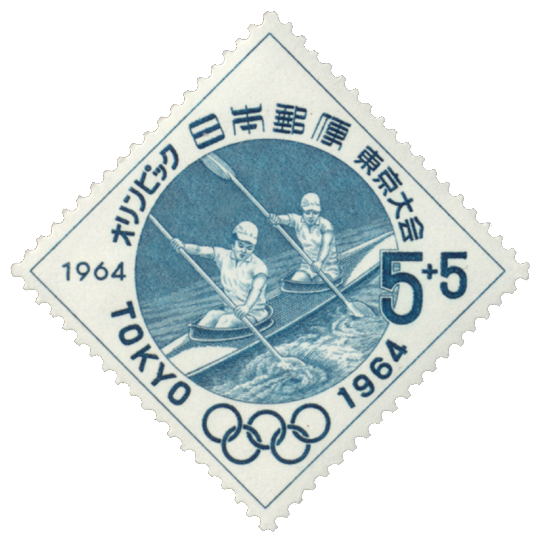
- Canoeing at the 1964 Summer Olympics (women's K2) on a stamp of Japan
- No. of events: 7

Canoeing at the 1964 Summer Olympics was held between 20 October 1964 and 22 October 1964 on Lake Sagami, 60 kilometres (37 miles) from Sagamiko, Kanagawa, Japan. There were 7 events, 5 of which were for men and 2 for women. Both of the women's events were 500 metre kayaking events; there were three kayaking and two canoeing events for men, all of which covered 1000 metres. The K-4 event for men was introduced to the Olympic program at these Games, replacing the 4×500 metre K-1 event that was raced in the 1960 Games.

The Romanian canoeists garnered the most medals at 5, but did not win a single gold medal. In that category the Soviet competitors were the most successful, taking three championships. The German team and the Swedish team each won a pair of golds as well.

== Medal table ==
Rank	Nation	Gold	Silver	Bronze	Total
1	Soviet Union	3	0	1	4
2	United Team of Germany	2	1	1	4
3	Sweden	2	0	0	2
4	Romania	0	2	3	5
5	United States	0	1	1	2
6	France	0	1	0	1
6	Hungary	0	1	0	1
6	Netherlands	0	1	0	1
9	Denmark	0	0	1	1
Totals (9 entries)		7	7	7	21

== Medal summary ==
=== Men's events ===
Games	Gold	Silver	Bronze
C-1 1000 m	Jürgen Eschert; United Team of Germany	Andrei Igorov; Romania	Yevgeny Penyayev; Soviet Union
C-2 1000 m	Andrei Khimich and Stepan Oshchepkov (URS)	Jean Boudehen and Michel Chapuis (FRA)	Peer Nielsen and John Sørensen (DEN)
K-1 1000 m	Rolf Peterson; Sweden	Mihály Hesz; Hungary	Aurel Vernescu; Romania
K-2 1000 m	Gunnar Utterberg and Sven-Olov Sjödelius (SWE)	Antonius Geurts and Paul Hoekstra (NED)	Heinz Büker and Holger Zander (EUA)
K-4 1000 m	Soviet Union; Nikolai Chuzhikov; Anatoli Grishin; Vyacheslav Ionov; Vladimir Morozov	United Team of Germany; Günther Perleberg; Bernhard Schulze; Friedhelm Wentzke; Holger Zander	Romania; Simion Cuciuc; Atanase Sciotnic; Mihai Țurcaș; Aurel Vernescu

=== Women's events ===
Games	Gold	Silver	Bronze
K-1 500 m	Lyudmila Khvedosyuk; Soviet Union	Hilde Lauer; Romania	Marcia Jones; United States
K-2 500 m	Annemarie Zimmermann and Roswitha Esser (EUA)	Francine Fox and Glorianne Perrier (USA)	Hilde Lauer and Cornelia Sideri (ROU)
