= Charlotte Marquardt =

East German sprint canoer

Medal record

Women's canoe sprint

World Championships
Bronze medal – third place	1963 Jajce	K-4 500 m

Charlotte Marquardt (née Seidelmann) is an East German sprint canoer who competed in the mid-1960s.

At the 1963 ICF Canoe Sprint World Championships in Jajce, Yugoslavia, Seidelmann teamed up with Anita Nüßner and came fourth in the K-2 500 m. Alongside Marion Knobba and Helga Ulze, they won bronze with the K-4 500 m. In the 1964 season, Marquardt (now using her married name) again teamed up with Nüßner for the K-2 500 m. At a regatta in Poznan, Marquardt and Nüßner came first. With 1964 an Olympic year, inner-German contests had to be held for the qualifications to the United Team of Germany. Marquardt and Nüßner caused a sensation when they beat the reigning champions, Annemarie Zimmermann and Roswitha Esser, at the first regatta held on the Mittelland Canal at the Rothensee boat lift. At the second Olympic qualifying regatta in Duisburg the East Germans could not repeat their performance and were beaten by both West German teams. Consequently, Zimmermann and Esser won the nomination and subsequently Olympic gold.

She married the canoeist Horst Marquardt between the 1963 and 1964 seasons. He was East German champion in 1961 in the K-1 500 m alongside Siegwart Karbe.
