= Koltai =

Koltai is a Hungarian surname. Notable people with the surname include:

- Henrik Koltai (born 1913), Hungarian long jumper
- Imre Koltai (1938–2022), Hungarian politician
- János Koltai (1935–2026), Hungarian actor
- Lajos Koltai (born 1946), Hungarian cinematographer and film director
- Otto Koltai, Hungarian sprint canoeist
- Ralph Koltai (1924–2018), British stage director
- Róbert Koltai (born 1943), Hungarian actor, film director and screenwriter
- Tamás Koltai, multiple people
