= Koblenz (disambiguation) =

Koblenz is a German city situated on the Rhine at its confluence with the Moselle.

Koblenz may also refer to:

- Koblenz, Switzerland, a municipality in Canton Aargau at the confluence of the Rhine and Aar
- Koblenz (region), a former administrative subdivision of the German state of Rhineland-Palatinate
- Koblenz (Lohsa), a constituent part of the former municipality of Knappensee in Saxony, Germany
- Koblenz Appliances, a brand of consumer white appliances
- Gerson Coblenz, 18th century French rabbi
- Coblenz, Namibia, a small town in Namibia

== See also ==
- SS Coblenz, original name of the steamship SS Cuba
