= Vinnik =

Vinnik or Vynnyk (Russian: Винник; Ukrainian: Винник) is a surname. Notable people with the surname include:

- Alexander Vinnik (born c. 1979), Russian computer expert
- Oleh Vynnyk (born 1973), Ukrainian singer
- Solomiia Vynnyk, Ukrainian freestyle wrestler
- Vyacheslav Vinnik (born 1939), Soviet sprint canoer

== See also ==
- Vinnikov
