= Canoeing at the 1968 Summer Olympics – Men's K-1 1000 metres =

The men's K-1 1000 metres event was an individual kayaking event conducted as part of the Canoeing at the 1968 Summer Olympics program. Heats and the first repechage were timed in tenths of a second (0.1) while semifinals and finals were timed in hundredths of a second (0.01) in the official report.

== Medalists ==
Gold	Silver	Bronze
Mihály Hesz (HUN)	Aleksandr Shaparenko (URS)	Erik Hansen (DEN)

== Results ==
=== Heats ===
The 20 competitors first raced in three heats on October 22. The top three finishers from each of the heats advanced directly to the semifinals. One competitor capsized during their heat while another did not start. All remaining competitors competed in the repechages the next day.

Heat 1
1.	Rolf Peterson (SWE)	4:02.6	QS
2.	Andrei Contolenco (ROU)	4:03.7	QS
3.	Mihály Hesz (HUN)	4:04.7	QS
4.	Paul Hoekstra (NED)	4:05.7	QR
5.	Adrian Powell (AUS)	4:07.3	QR
6.	John Glair (USA)	4:13.5	QR
-	Fernando Inchauste (BOL)	Did not finish
-	Günther Pfaff (AUT)	Did not start
Heat 2
1.	Erik Hansen (DEN)	4:05.6	QS
2.	Rolf Olsen (NOR)	4:08.0	QS
3.	Horst Mattern (FRG)	4:09.5	QS
4.	Marc Moens (BEL)	4:09.6	QR
5.	José María Colon (ESP)	4:16.5	QR
6.	John Glavin (GBR)	4:18.7	QR
7.	Fidel Santander (MEX)	4:28.8	QR
Heat 3
1.	Władysław Szuszkiewicz (POL)	4:03.4	QS
2.	Aleksandr Shaparenko (URS)	4:04.6	QS
3.	Wolfgang Lange (GDR)	4:05.3	QS
4.	Václav Mára (TCH)	4:05.4	QR
5.	Gabor Joo (CAN)	4:11.8	QR
6.	Jouko Viitamäki (FIN)	4:22.2	QR
7.	Jérôme Dodo Gaye (CIV)	4:31.2	QR

Inchusate's boat capsized during the first heat. In the third heat, Viitamäki is shown as Ilkka Nummisto in the official report though Viitamäki's name is shown correctly for the rest of the event.

=== Repechages ===
Taking place on October 23, three repechages were held. The top three finishers in each repechages advanced to the semifinals.

Repechage 1
1.	José María Colon (ESP)	4:16.6	QS
2.	Paul Hoekstra (NED)	4:18.3	QS
3.	Jouko Viitamäki (FIN)	4:25.8	QS
Repechage 2
1.	Marc Moens (BEL)	4:29.08	QS
2.	Gabor Joo (CAN)	4:29.40	QS
3.	John Glair (USA)	4:29.89	QS
4.	Fidel Santander (MEX)	4:30.09
Repechage 3
1.	Adrian Powell (AUS)	4:14.05	QS
2.	John Glavin (GBR)	4:19.28	QS
3.	Václav Mára (TCH)	4:20.58	QS
4.	Jérôme Dodo Gaye (CIV)	4:31.69

=== Semifinals ===
The top three finishers in each of the three semifinals (raced on October 24) advanced to the final.

Semifinal 1
1.	Rolf Peterson (SWE)	4:01.39	QF
2.	Václav Mára (TCH)	4:03.31	QF
3.	Wolfgang Lange (GDR)	4:04.62	QF
4.	Rolf Olsen (NOR)	4:09.08
5.	José María Colon (ESP)	4:13.17
6.	Gabor Joo (CAN)	4:17.50
Semifinal 2
1.	Erik Hansen (DEN)	3:58.72	QF
2.	Aleksandr Shaparenko (URS)	3:59.37	QF
3.	Mihály Hesz (HUN)	4:04.97	QF
4.	Marc Moens (BEL)	4:06.55
5.	John Glavin (GBR)	4:14.93
6.	Jouko Viitamäki (FIN)	4:21.52
Semifinal 3
1.	Władysław Szuszkiewicz (POL)	4:05.72	QF
2.	Paul Hoekstra (NED)	4:06.73	QF
3.	Andrei Contolenco (ROU)	4:06.78	QF
4.	John Glair (USA)	4:08.31
5.	Adrian Powell (AUS)	4:08.78
6.	Horst Mattern (FRG)	4:13.46

=== Final ===
The final took place on October 25.

Gold	Mihály Hesz (HUN)	4:02.63
Silver	Aleksandr Shaparenko (URS)	4:03.58
Bronze	Erik Hansen (DEN)	4:04.39
4.	Władysław Szuszkiewicz (POL)	4:06.36
5.	Rolf Peterson (SWE)	4:07.86
6.	Václav Mára (TCH)	4:09.35
7.	Andrei Contolenco (ROU)	4:09.96
8.	Wolfgang Lange (GDR)	4:10.03
9.	Paul Hoekstra (NED)	4:13.28

Hesz was fifth at the 500 meter mark, then made his move with 200 meters left. He passed both Hansen and Shaparenko in the last 100 meters.
