= Kalyagin =

Kalyagin (Russian: Калягин) is a Russian masculine surname, its feminine counterpart is Kalyagina. Notable people with the surname include:

- Alexander Kalyagin (born 1942), Russian actor and film director
- Vasiliy Kalyagin, Soviet sprint canoer
