= Aleksandr Trifonov =

Aleksandr Trifonov may refer to:

- Alexandr Trifonov (born 1986), Kazakh biathlete
- Aleksandr Trifonov (canoeist), Soviet sprint canoeist
