= Obraztsov =

Obraztsov (masculine, Russian: Образцов) or Obraztsova (feminine, Russian: Образцовa) is a Russian surname. Notable people with the surname include:

- Elena Obraztsova (1939–2015), Russian operatic mezzo-soprano
- Evgenia Obraztsova (also spelled Yevgenia Obraztsova) (born 1984), Russian prima ballerina
- Sergey Obraztsov (1901–1992), Russian Soviet puppeteer
- Vladimir Obraztsov (born 1940), Soviet sprint canoeist

== See also ==
- 4623 Obraztsova, main-belt asteroid named after Elena Obraztsova
