= Vernescu =

Vernescu is a Romanian surname. Notable people with the surname include:

- Aurel Vernescu (1939–2008), Romanian sprint canoeist
- George D. Vernescu (1829–1900), Wallachian-born Romanian politician
