= Fritz Briel =

German canoeist (1934–2017)

Medal record

Men's canoe sprint

Representing Germany

Olympic Games
Silver medal – second place	1956 Melbourne	K-2 10000 m

World Championships
Gold medal – first place	1958 Prague	K-1 1000 m
Gold medal – first place	1958 Prague	K-1 4 x 500 m
Gold medal – first place	1963 Jajce	K-1 10000 m
Bronze medal – third place	1966 East Berlin	K-1 10000 m

Fritz Briel (24 October 1934 – 15 March 2017) was a German sprint canoeist, born in Düsseldorf, who competed in from the late 1950s to the late 1960s. He won a silver medal in the K-2 10000 m event at the 1956 Summer Olympics in Melbourne. Briel also won four medals at the ICF Canoe Sprint World Championships with three golds (K-1 1000 m: 1958, K-1 10000 m: 1963, K-1 4 x 500 m: 1958) and one bronze (K-1 10000 m: 1966).
