= Nikolay Konnikov =

Medal record

Men's canoe sprint

World Championships
Bronze medal – third place	1963 Jajce	K-4 1000 m

Nikolay Konnikov is a Soviet sprint canoer who competed in the early 1960s. He won a bronze medal in the K-4 1000 m event at the 1963 ICF Canoe Sprint World Championships in Jajce.
