= Jouko Viitamäki =

Finnish canoeist (born 1949

Jouko Viitamäki (born January 29, 1949, in Hämeenlinna) is a Finnish sprint canoer who competed in the late 1960s. He was eliminated in the semifinals of the K-1 1000 m event at the 1968 Summer Olympics in Mexico City.
