= Crișan, Tulcea =

Crișan Кришан
- Commune
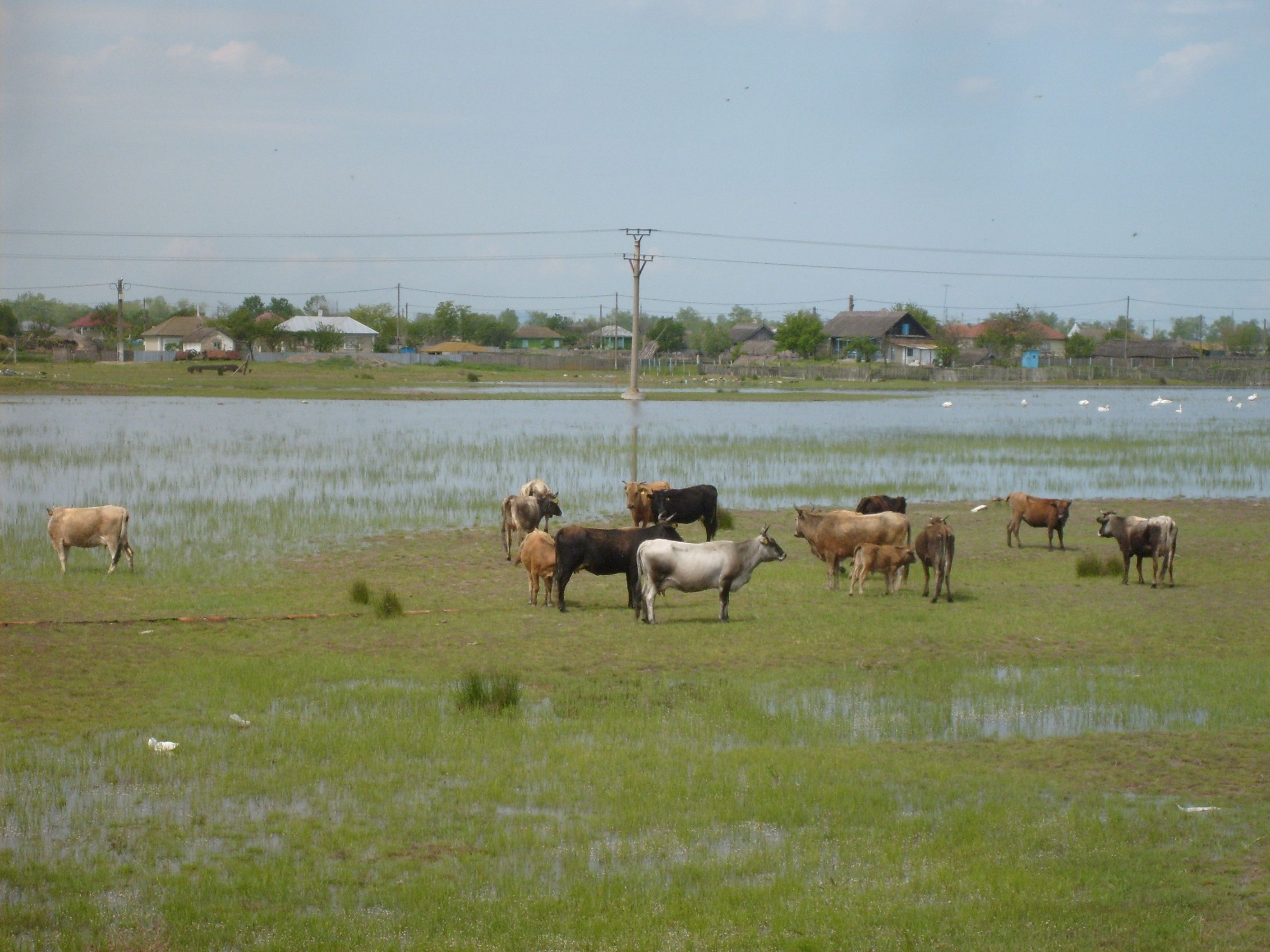
- The Danube Delta in Caraorman

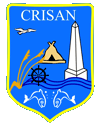
- Coat of arms

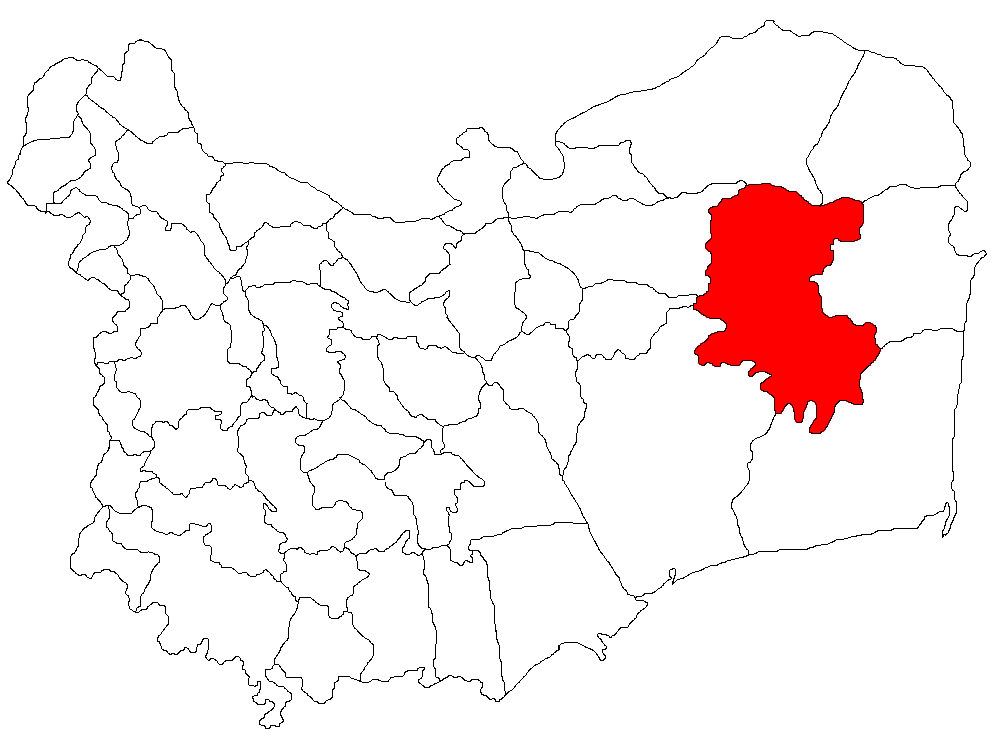
- Location in Tulcea County

- Location in Romania
- Coordinates: 45°10′N 29°23′E
- Country: Romania
- County: Tulcea
- Subdivisions: Crișan, Caraorman, Mila 23

Government
  - Mayor (2024–2028): Silviu Florin Rahău (PSD)
- Area: 380.70 km^{2} (146.99 sq mi)
- Elevation: 2 m (6.6 ft)
- Population (2021-12-01): 1,092
  - Density: 2.868/km^{2} (7.429/sq mi)
- Time zone: UTC+02:00 (EET)
  - Summer (DST): UTC+03:00 (EEST)
- Postal code: 827060
- Area code: +40 x40
- Vehicle reg.: TL
- Website: www.primariacrisan.ro

Crișan (Russian: Кришан) is a commune in Tulcea County, Northern Dobruja, Romania. It includes three villages: Caraorman (45°04′54″N 29°23′20″E), Crișan (45°10′25″N 29°23′26″E), and Mila 23 (45°13′43″N 29°14′57″E).

The commune is located in the middle of the Danube Delta, about 50 km (31 mi) downriver from the county seat, Tulcea. It is crossed west to east by the Sulina branch of the Danube and it is bordered to the south by the Sfântu Gheorghe branch. It neighbors Chilia Veche and C. A. Rosetti communes to the north, the town of Sulina to the east, Sfântu Gheorghe commune to the south, and Murighiol and Maliuc communes to the west.

At the 2021 census, Crișan had 1,092 inhabitants; of those, 77.47% were Romanians, 9.71% Lipovans, and 5.86% Ukrainians. At the 2011 census, the commune had a population of 1,228, of which 52.1% were Romanians, 26.2% Russians or Lipovans, and 21.6% Ukrainians. At the 2002 census, 74.8% were Romanian Orthodox and 25% Lipovan Old-Rite Orthodox.

== Natives ==
- Vicol Calabiciov, sprint canoeist
- Lavrente Calinov (1936-2018), sprint canoeist
- Serghei Covaliov (1944–2011), sprint canoeist
- Haralambie Ivanov (1941–2004), sprint canoeist
- Maria Nichiforov (1951–2022), sprint canoeist
- Ivan Patzaichin (1949–2021), sprint canoeist and canoe racing coach, the winner of four Olympic gold medals
- Silviu Simioncencu (born 1975), sprint canoeist
- Gheorghe Simionov (born 1950), sprint canoeist
- Toma Simionov (born 1955), sprint canoeist
- Agafia Constantin (born 1955), sprint canoeist

== Gallery ==
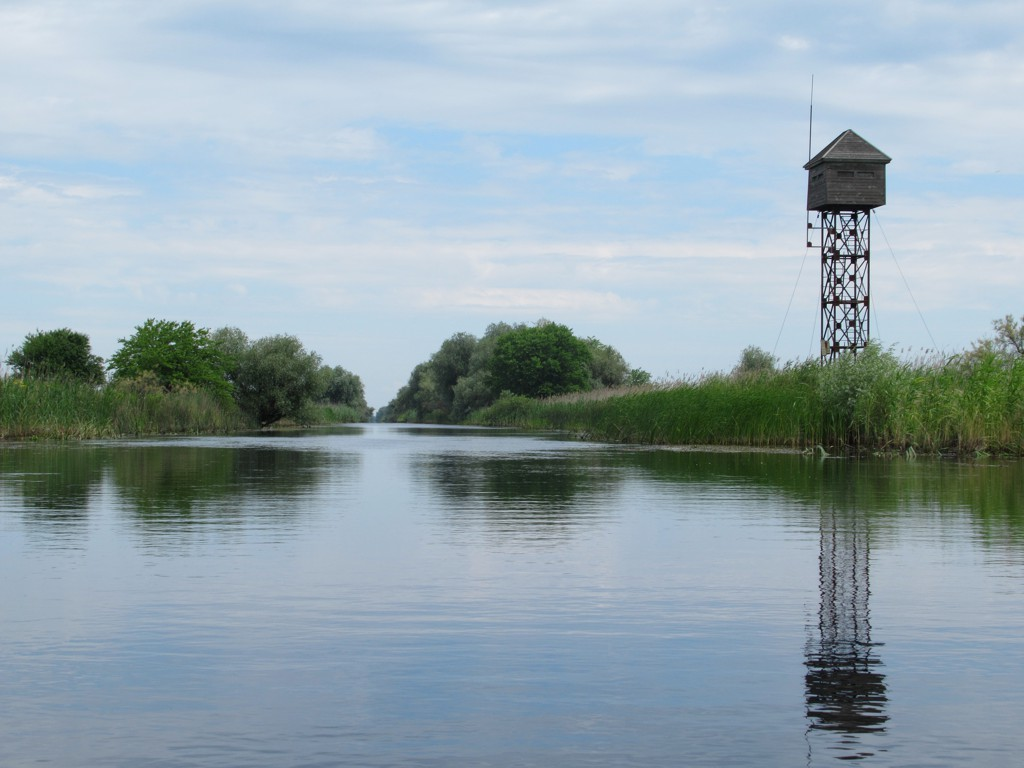
Bird watching tower in Crișan

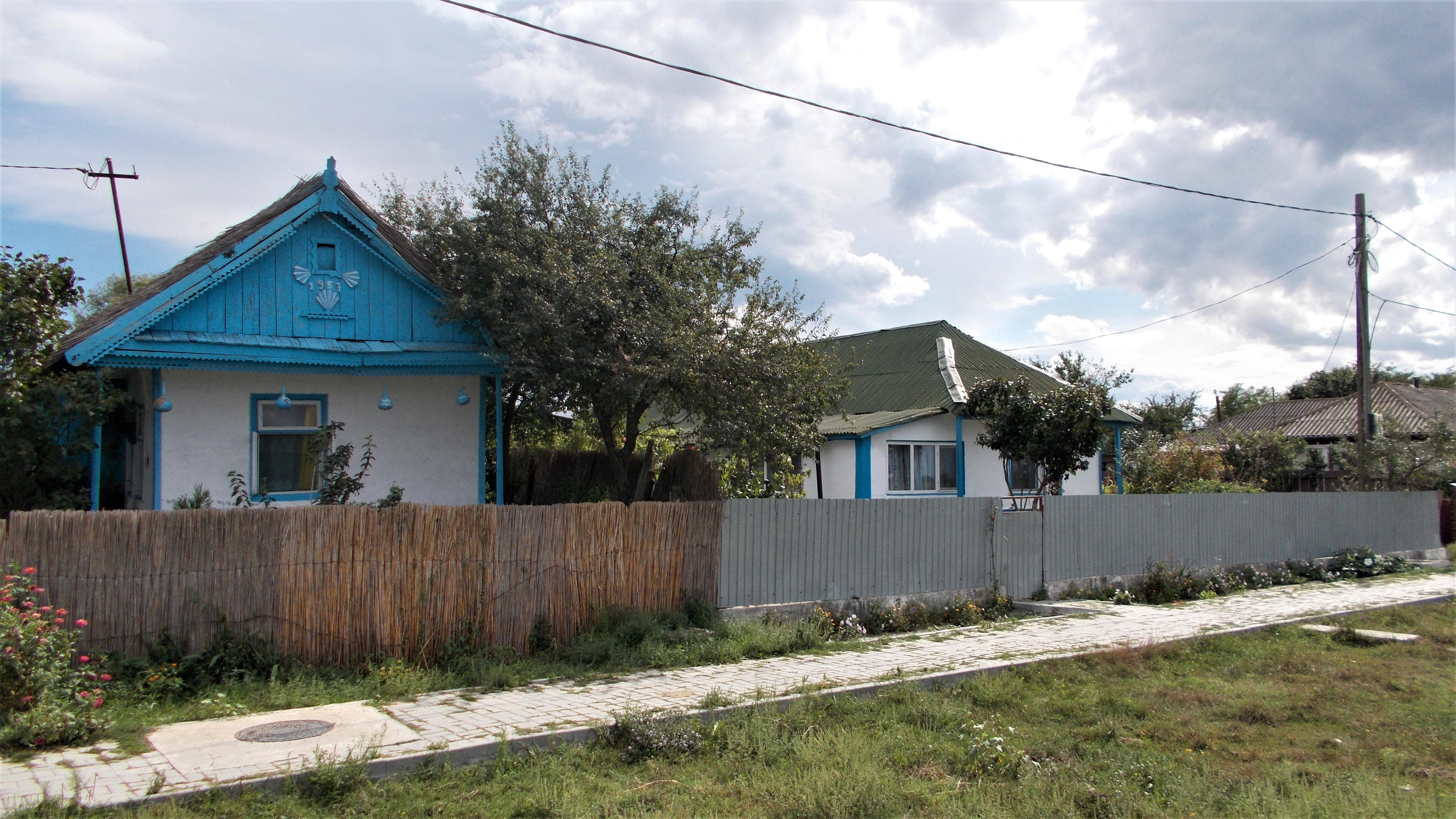
Mila 23

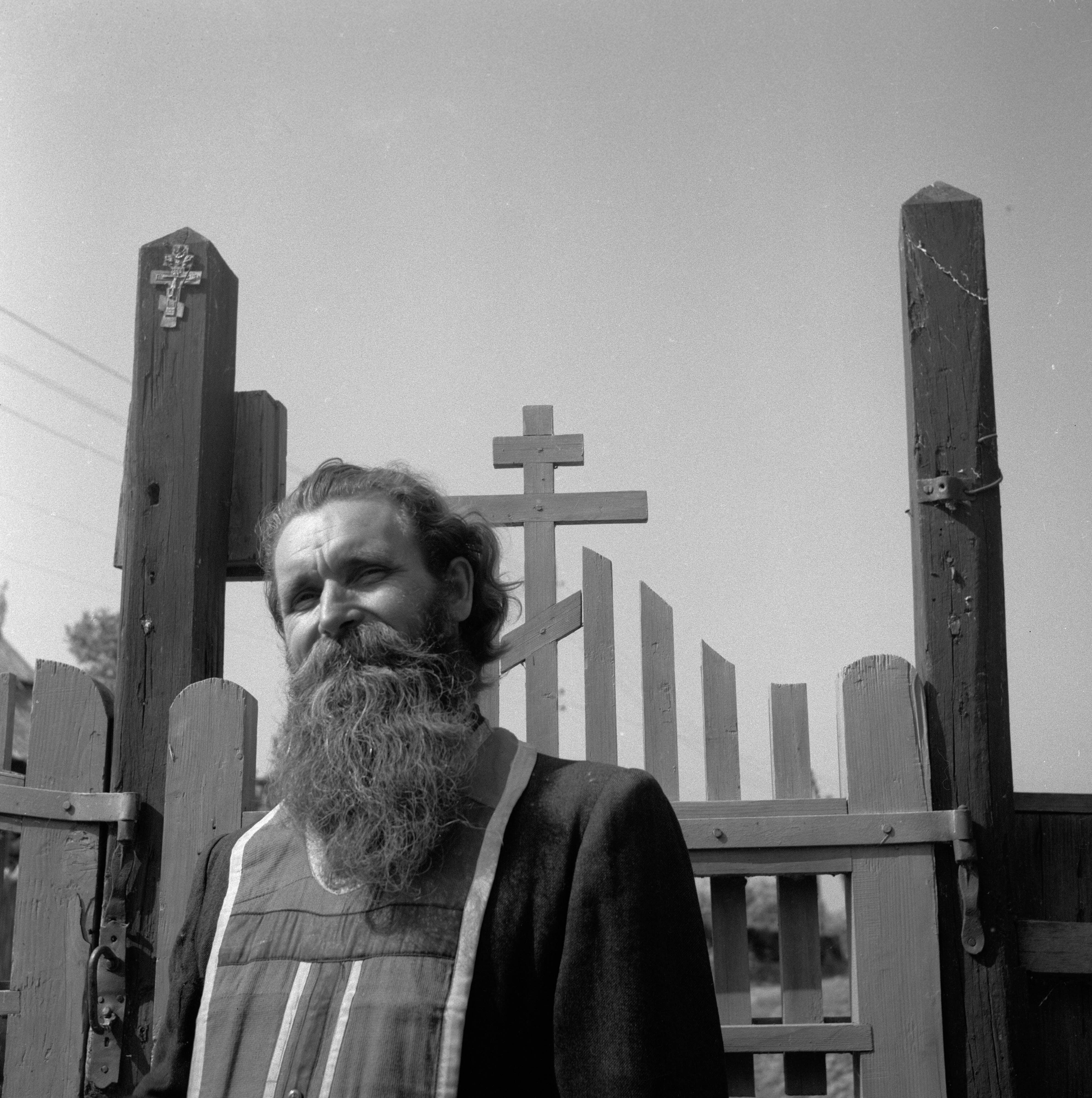
Lipovan priest in Mila 23 (1963)
