= Valentina Bizak =

Soviet canoeist

Medal record

Women's canoe sprint

World Championships
Gold medal – first place	1963 Jajce	K-4 500 m
Bronze medal – third place	1963 Jajce	K-2 500 m

Valentina Bizak is a Soviet sprint canoer who competed in the early 1960s. She won two medals at the 1963 ICF Canoe Sprint World Championships with a gold in the K-4 500 m and a bronze in the K-2 500 m events.
