= György Czink =

Hungarian canoeist

Medal record

Men's canoe sprint

World Championships
Bronze medal – third place	1963 Jajce	K-4 10000 m

György Czink (12 November 1939 – 1 May 2018) was a Hungarian sprint canoer who competed in the mid-1960s. He won a bronze medal in the K-4 10000 m event at the 1963 ICF Canoe Sprint World Championships in Jajce.
