= Kálmán Kovács (canoeist) =

Hungarian canoeist

Medal record

Men's canoe sprint

World Championships
Bronze medal – third place	1963 Jajce	K-1 500 m

Kálmán Kovács is a Hungarian sprint canoer who competed in the late 1950s. He won a bronze medal in the K-1 500 m event at the 1963 ICF Canoe Sprint World Championships in Jajce.
