= Gabor Joo =

Canadian canoeist

Gabor Joo (born March 12, 1937) is a Canadian sprint canoer who competed in the mid to late 1960s. At the 1964 Summer Olympics in Tokyo, he was eliminated in the semifinals of the K-2 1000 m event. Four years later in Mexico City, Joo was eliminated in the semifinals of the K-1 1000 m event and in the heats of the K-4 1000 m event.
