= Käthe Pohland =

Medal record

Women's canoe sprint

World Championships
Bronze medal – third place	1966 East Berlin	K-4 500 m

Käthe Pohland is an East German sprint canoeist who competed in the late 1960s. She won a bronze medal in the K-4 500 m event at the 1966 ICF Canoe Sprint World Championships in East Berlin.
