= Fidel Santander =

Mexican canoeist (born 1947)

Fidel Santander (born April 13, 1947) is a Mexican sprint canoer who competed in the late 1960s. He was eliminated in the repechages of the K-1 1000 m event at the 1968 Summer Olympics in Mexico City.
