= Siegfried Roßberg =

German canoeist

Personal information
- Born: 4 November 1936 (age 89) Dresden
- Height: 182 cm (6 ft 0 in)
- Weight: 69 kg (152 lb)

Sport
- Sport: Canoeing
Medal record
Men's canoe sprint
World Championships
Gold medal – first place	1963 Jajce	K-4 1000 m
Bronze medal – third place	1963 Jajce	K-1 1000 m
Bronze medal – third place	1963 Jajce	K-1 4 x 500 m

Siegfried Roßberg (born 4 November 1936 in Dresden) is an East German sprint canoeist who competed in the early 1960s. He won three medals at the 1963 ICF Canoe Sprint World Championships in Jajce with a gold (K-4 1000 m) and two bronzes (K-1 1000 m, K-1 4 x 500 m). He has received the awards Master of Sport and Honoured Master of Sport. He studied at TU Dresden and graduated Bachelor of Engineering (civil).
