= 1966 ICF Canoe Sprint World Championships =

International canoe competition

The 1966 ICF Canoe Sprint World Championships were held in the East Berlin suburb of Grünau in East Germany. This event was held under the auspices of the International Canoe Federation. From 19 to 21 August, competitors used the regatta course on the Langer See that had previously been used for the canoeing and rowing events at the 1936 Summer Olympics.

The men's competition consisted of four Canadian (single paddle, open boat) and nine kayak events. Three events were held for the women, all in kayak. This was the first championships which had one competitor or team per nation per event, a rule that continues as of 2008.

It was also the seventh championships in canoe sprint.

== Medal summary ==
=== Men's ===
==== Canoe ====
| Event | Gold | Time | Silver | Time | Bronze | Time |
|---|---|---|---|---|---|---|
| C-1 1000 m | Detlef Lewe (FRG) | 4:29.33 | Tamás Wichmann (HUN) | | Anatoly Martinov (URS) | |
| C-1 10000 m | Antal Hajba (HUN) | | Rudolf Pěnkava (TCH) | | Mikhail Zamotin (URS) | |
| C-2 1000 m | Romania; Vicol Calabiciov; Serghei Covaliov | 4:10.98 | Sweden; Bernt Lindelöf; Erik Zeidlitz | | Hungary; Árpád Soltész; Csaba Szantó | |
| C-2 10000 m | Romania; Petre Maxim; Gheorghe Simionov | | Soviet Union; Valeriy Drybas; Andrey Khimich | | Hungary; András Peter; István Cserha | |

==== Kayak ====
| Event | Gold | Time | Silver | Time | Bronze | Time |
|---|---|---|---|---|---|---|
| K-1 500 m | Aurel Vernescu (ROU) | | Erik Hansen (DEN) | | Paul Hoekstra (NED) | |
| K-1 1000 m | Aleksandr Shaparenko (URS) | 3:59.26 | Erik Hansen (DEN) | | Imre Kemecsey (HUN) | |
| K-1 10000 m | Mihály Hesz (HUN) | | Vladimir Zemlyakov (URS) | | Fritz Briel (GER) | |
| K-1 4 x 500 m relay | Soviet Union; Georgiy Karyukhin; Yuriy Kabanov; Vilnis Baltiņš; Dmitry Matveyev | 7:36.05 | Hungary; Mihály Hesz; András Szente; Ferenc Cseh; Imre Kemecsey | | Romania; Vasilie Nicoară; Haralambie Ivanov; Atanase Sciotnic; Aurel Vernescu | |
| K-2 500 m | Romania; Aurel Vernescu; Atanase Sciotnic | | West Germany; Heinz Büker; Holger Zander | | Soviet Union; Vladimir Obraztsov; Georgiy Karyukhin | |
| K-2 1000 m | Soviet Union; Aleksandr Shaparenko; Yuri Stetsenko | 3:37.51 | Romania; Aurel Vernescu; Atanase Sciotnic | | Hungary; Ferenc Cseh; Endre Hazsik | |
| K-2 10000 m | Hungary; Imre Szöllősi; László Fábián | | Norway; Egil Søby; Jan Johansen | | Czechoslovakia; Pavel Kvasil; František Švec | |
| K-4 1000 m | Romania; Atanase Sciotnic; Mihai Țurcaș; Haralambie Ivanov; Anton Calenic | | Austria; Günther Pfaff; Kurt Lindlgruber; Helmut Hediger; Gerhard Seibold | | Soviet Union; Aleksandr Shaparenko; Yuri Stetsenko; Vladimir Morozov; Georgiy Karyukhin | |
| K-4 10000 m | Soviet Union; Nikolai Chuzhikov; Anatoli Grishin; Vladimir Morozov; Vyacheslav Ionov | 36:56.68 | Hungary; Imre Szöllősi; László Fábián; János Petroczy; László Ürögi | | East Germany; Günter Holzvoigt; Wolfgang Lange; Wolfgang Niedrig; Siegwart Karbe | |

=== Women's ===
==== Kayak ====
| Event | Gold | Time | Silver | Time | Bronze | Time |
|---|---|---|---|---|---|---|
| K-1 500 m | Lyudmila Pinayeva (URS) | | Roswitha Esser (FRG) | | Anita Kobuß (GDR) | |
| K-2 500 m | East Germany; Anita Kobuß; Helga Mühlberg-Ulze | 1:59.41 | Soviet Union; Mariya Shubina; Antonina Seredina | | Hungary; Katalin Benkő; Anna Pfeffer | |
| K-4 500 m | Soviet Union; Mariya Shubina; Antonina Seredina; Lyudmila Pinayeva; Nadezhda Levchenko | 1:45.91 | West Germany; Sigrud Kummer; Roswitha Esser; Irene Rozema; Renate Breuer | | East Germany; Käthe Pohland; Karin Haftenberger; Anita Kobuß; Helga Mühlberg-Ulze | |

== Medals table ==
| Rank | Nation | Gold | Silver | Bronze | Total |
|---|---|---|---|---|---|
| 1 | Soviet Union (URS) | 6 | 3 | 4 | 13 |
| 2 | Romania (ROU) | 5 | 1 | 1 | 7 |
| 3 | Hungary (HUN) | 3 | 3 | 5 | 11 |
| 4 | West Germany (FRG) | 1 | 3 | 1 | 5 |
| 5 | East Germany (GDR) | 1 | 0 | 3 | 4 |
| 6 | Denmark (DEN) | 0 | 2 | 0 | 2 |
| 7 | Czechoslovakia (TCH) | 0 | 1 | 1 | 2 |
| 8 | Austria (AUT) | 0 | 1 | 0 | 1 |
| 8 | Norway (NOR) | 0 | 1 | 0 | 1 |
| 8 | Sweden (SWE) | 0 | 1 | 0 | 1 |
| 11 | Netherlands (NED) | 0 | 0 | 1 | 1 |
| Totals (11 entries) | | 16 | 16 | 16 | 48 |
