= Alexe Iacovici =

Romanian canoeist

Medal record

Men's canoe sprint

World Championships
Gold medal – first place	1963 Jajce	C-2 1000 m

Alexe Iacovici is a Romanian sprint canoer who competed in the early 1960s. He won a gold medal in the C-2 1000 m event at the 1963 ICF Canoe Sprint World Championships in Jajce.
