= Lyubov Sinchina =

Soviet canoeist

Medal record

Women's canoe sprint

World Championships
Bronze medal – third place	1963 Jajce	K-2 500 m

Lyubov Sinchina is a Soviet sprint canoer who competed in the early 1960s. She won a bronze medal in the K-2 500 m event at the 1963 ICF Canoe Sprint World Championships in Jajce.
