= Sigrud Kummer =

German canoeist

Medal record

Women's canoe sprint

World Championships
Silver medal – second place	1966 East Berlin	K-4 500 m

Sigrud Kummer is a West German sprint canoeist who competed in the late 1960s. She won a silver medal in the K-4 500 m event at the 1966 ICF Canoe Sprint World Championships in East Berlin.
