= Siegfred Brzoska =

German canoeist

Medal record

Men's canoe sprint

World Championships
Bronze medal – third place	1963 Jajce	K-2 10000 m

Siegfred Brzoska is a West German sprint canoer who competed in the mid-1960s. He won a bronze medal in the K-2 10000 m event at the 1963 ICF Canoe Sprint World Championships in Jajce.
