= Sámuel Egri =

Hungarian canoeist

Medal record

Men's canoe sprint

World Championships
Bronze medal – third place	1963 Jajce	K-4 10000 m

Sámuel Egri is a Hungarian sprint canoer who competed in the mid-1960s. He won a bronze medal in the K-4 10000 m event at the 1963 ICF Canoe Sprint World Championships in Jajce.
