= Václav Mára =

Czechoslovak sprint canoer (born 1943)

Václav Mára (August 5, 1943 – May 22, 2023) was a Czechoslovak sprint canoer who competed in the late 1960s. He finished sixth in the K-1 1000 m event at the 1968 Summer Olympics in Mexico City. He was born in Sedlec-Prčice.
