= Nadezhda Levchenko =

Soviet canoeist

Medal record

Women's canoe sprint

World Championships
Gold medal – first place	1966 East Berlin	K-4 500 m

European Championships
Gold medal – first place	1965 Bucharest	K-4 500 m
Gold medal – first place	1967 Duisburg	K-4 500 m
Silver medal – second place	1965 Bucharest	K-2 500 m

Nadezhda Levchenko (Russian: Надежда Левченко, née Milinchuk; born 7 November 1931) is a Soviet sprint canoeist who competed in the mid-1960s. She won a gold medal in the K-4 500 m event at the 1966 ICF Canoe Sprint World Championships in East Berlin.
