= Gábor Almasi =

Hungarian canoeist

Medal record

Men's canoe sprint

World Championships
Bronze medal – third place	1963 Jajce	K-4 10000 m

Gábor Almasi is a Hungarian sprint canoer who competed in the mid-1960s.

== Career ==
He won a bronze medal in the K-4 10000 m event at the 1963 ICF Canoe Sprint World Championships in Jajce.
