= Nicolae Artimov =

Romanian sprint canoer

Medal record

Men's canoe sprint

World Championships
Silver medal – second place	1963 Jajce	K-4 1000 m

Nicolae Artimov is a Romanian sprint canoer who competed in the early 1960s. He won a silver medal in the K-4 1000 m event at the 1963 ICF Canoe Sprint World Championships in Jajce.
