= 1963 ICF Canoe Sprint World Championships =

International canoeing and kayaking event

The 1963 ICF Canoe Sprint World Championships were held in Jajce, Yugoslavia (present-day Bosnia and Herzegovina). This event was held under the auspices of the International Canoe Federation.

The men's competition consisted of four Canadian (single paddle, open boat) and nine kayak events. Three events were held for the women, all in kayak. The women's K-4 500 m event debuted at these championships.

This was the sixth championships in canoe sprint.

== Medal summary ==
=== Men's ===
==== Canoe ====
Event	Gold	Time	Silver	Time	Bronze	Time
C-1 1000 m	Simion Ismailciuc (ROU)		Detlef Lewe (GER)		Albrecht Müller (GDR)	
C-1 10000 m	Mikhail Zamotin (URS)		Andrei Igorov (ROU)		Albrecht Müller (GDR)	
C-2 1000 m	Romania; Achim Sidorov; Alexe Iacovici		Soviet Union; Vitaliy Galkov; Mikhail Zamotin		Hungary; Endre Gyürü; Árpád Soltész	
C-2 10000 m	Soviet Union; Leonid Geishtor; Sergey Makarenko		East Germany; Willi Mehlberg; Werner Ulrich		Romania; Lavrente Calinov; Igor Lipalit	

==== Kayak ====
Event	Gold	Time	Silver	Time	Bronze	Time
K-1 500 m	Aurel Vernescu (ROU)		Erik Hansen (DEN)		Kálmán Kovács (HUN)	
K-1 1000 m	Erik Hansen (DEN)		Aurel Vernescu (ROU)		Siegfried Rossberg (GDR)	
K-1 10000 m	Fritz Briel (GER)		Sven-Olov Sjödelius (SWE)		Mihály Hesz (HUN)	
K-1 4 x 500 m relay	Romania; Aurel Vernescu; Vasilie Nicoară; Haralambie Ivanov; Anton Ivanescu		Soviet Union; Vladimir Morozov; Vladimir Natalukha; Vyacheslav Vinnik; Ibragim Khasanov		East Germany; Wolfgang Lange; Dieter Krause; Siegfried Rossberg; Günter Perleberg	
K-2 500 m	Romania; Vasilie Nicoară; Haralambie Ivanov		Romania; Aurel Vernescu; Mircea Anastasescu		West Germany; Heinz Büker; Holger Zander	
K-2 1000 m	Romania; Vasilie Nicoară; Haralambie Ivanov		East Germany; Wolfgang Lange; Dieter Krause		Soviet Union; Nikolai Chuzhikov; Anatoli Grishin	
K-2 10000 m	Hungary; László Fábián; István Timár		Sweden; Tord Sahlén; Tyrone Ferm		West Germany; Erich Suhriber; Sigfred Brzoska	
K-4 1000 m	East Germany; Günter Perleberg; Dieter Krause; Siegfried Rossberg; Wolfgang Lange		Romania; Nicolae Artimov; Andrei Contolenco; Haralambie Ivanov; Vasilie Nicoară		Soviet Union; Aleksandr Trifonov; Igor Safonov; Nikolay Konnikov; Vyacheslav Vinnik	
K-4 10000 m	Hungary; István Timár; László Fábián; Otto Koltai; László Ürögi		East Germany; Günter Holzvoigt; Wolfgang Finger; Wolfgang Niedrig; Siegwart Karbe		Hungary; György Czink; János Petroczy; Gábor Almasi; Sámuel Egri	

=== Women's ===
==== Kayak ====
Event	Gold	Time	Silver	Time	Bronze	Time
K-1 500 m	Mariya Shubina (URS)		Lyudmila Khvedosyuk (URS)		Hanneliese Spitz (AUT)	
K-2 500 m	West Germany; Roswitha Esser; Annemarie Zimmermann		Soviet Union; Mariya Shubina; Lyudmila Khvedosyuk		Soviet Union; Valentina Bizak; Lyubov Sinchina	
K-4 500 m	Soviet Union; Valentina Bizak; Lyudmila Khvedosyuk; Mariya Shubina; Antonina Seredina		West Germany; Roswitha Esser; Erika Feltman; Ingrid Hertmann; Annemarie Zimmermann		East Germany; Marion Knobba; Anita Nüssner-Kobuss; Charlotte Siedelmann; Helga Mühlberg-Ulze	

== Medals table ==
Rank	Nation	Gold	Silver	Bronze	Total
1	Romania (ROU)	6	4	1	11
2	Soviet Union (URS)	4	4	3	11
3	West Germany (FRG)	2	2	2	6
4	Hungary (HUN)	2	0	4	6
5	East Germany (GDR)	1	3	5	9
6	Denmark (DEN)	1	1	0	2
7	Sweden (SWE)	0	2	0	2
8	Austria (AUT)	0	0	1	1
Totals (8 entries)		16	16	16	48
