= Endre Gyürü =

Hungarian sprint canoer

Medal record

Men's canoe sprint

World Championships
Bronze medal – third place	1963 Jajce	C-2 1000 m

Endre Gyürü is a Hungarian sprint canoer who competed in the early 1960s. He won a bronze medal in the C-2 1000 m event at the 1963 ICF Canoe Sprint World Championships in Jajce.
