= John Glavin =

British sprint canoer (born 1944)

John Glavin (born 16 February 1944) is a British canoe sprinter who was eliminated in the semifinals of the K-1 1000 m event at the 1968 Summer Olympics in Mexico City.
