= Ferenc Cseh =

Hungarian canoeist (1943–2018)

Medal record

Men's canoe sprint

World Championships
Silver medal – second place	1966 East Berlin	K-1 4 x 500 m
Bronze medal – third place	1966 East Berlin	K-2 1000 m

Ferenc Cseh (Budapest, 22 October 1943 – San Jose, California, 16 July 2018) was a Hungarian sprint kayaker who competed in the late 1960s. He won two medals at the 1966 ICF Canoe Sprint World Championships in East Berlin with silver in the K-1 4 x 500 m and a bronze in the K-2 1000 m events.
