= František Švec =

Czechoslovak sprint canoeist

Medal record

Men's canoe sprint

World Championships
| Bronze medal – third place | 1966 East Berlin | K-2 10000 m |

Franišek Švec is a Czechoslovak sprint canoeist who competed in the late 1960s. He won a bronze medal in the K-2 10000 m event at the 1966 ICF Canoe Sprint World Championships in East Berlin.
