= Anatoly Martinov =

Medal record

Men's canoe sprint

World Championships
Bronze medal – third place	1966 East Berlin	C-1 1000 m

Anatoly Martinov is a Soviet flatwater canoeist who competed in the late 1960s. He won a bronze medal in the C-1 1000 m event at the 1966 ICF Canoe Sprint World Championships in East Berlin, East Germany (now Berlin, Germany).
