= Marc Moens =

Belgian sprint canoer (born 1943)

Personal information
- Nationality: Belgian
- Born: 17 January 1943 (age 83) Ledeberg, Belgium

Sport
- Sport: Canoe sprint
- Club: Koninklijke Cano Club Gent

Achievements and titles
- Olympic finals: 1968 Summer Olympics, 1972 Summer Olympics

Marc Moens (Ledeberg, 17 January 1943) is a Belgian canoe sprinter who competed in the late 1960s and early 1970s. He was eliminated in the semifinals of the K-1 1000 m event at the 1968 Summer Olympics in Mexico City. Four years later at the 1972 Summer Olympics in Munich, Moens was eliminated in the semifinals of the K-2 1000 m event with teammate Herman Naegels.

After his sprint career, Moens started paddling in ICF Canoe Marathon World Championships and became world champion in his age category in 2007 in Györ.

Marc Moens is a retired garage holder, and still canoeing (edited April 2022) as a member of Koninklijke Cano Club Gent.
