= János Petroczy =

Hungarian canoeist

Medal record

Men's canoe sprint

World Championships
Silver medal – second place	1958 Prague	K-4 1000 m
Silver medal – second place	1966 East Berlin	K-4 10000 m
Bronze medal – third place	1963 Jajce	K-4 10000 m

János Petroczy is a Hungarian sprint canoeist who competed from the late 1950s to the late 1960s. He won three medals at the ICF Canoe Sprint World Championships with two silvers (K-4 1000 m: 1958, K-4 10000 m: 1966) and a bronze (K-4 10000 m: 1963).
