= John Glair =

American sprint canoer (born 1942)

John Glair (born March 8, 1942 in Traverse City, Michigan) is an American sprint canoer who competed in the late 1960s. He was eliminated in the semifinals of the K-1 1000 m event at the 1968 Summer Olympics in Mexico City.
