= Anton Ivanescu =

Romanian canoeist

Medal record

Men's canoe sprint

World Championships
Gold medal – first place	1963 Jajce	K-1 4 x 500 m

Anton Ivanescu is a Romanian sprint canoeist who competed in the mid-1960s. He won a gold medal in the K-1 4 x 500 m event at the 1963 ICF Canoe Sprint World Championships in Jajce.
