= András Peter =

Hungarian sprint canoeist

Medal record

Men's canoe sprint

World Championships
Bronze medal – third place	1966 East Berlin	C-2 10000 m

András Peter is a Hungarian sprint canoeist who competed in the late 1960s. He won a bronze medal in the C-2 10000 m event at the 1966 ICF Canoe Sprint World Championships in East Berlin.
