= Igor Safonov =

Medal record

Men's canoe sprint

World Championships
| Bronze medal – third place | 1963 Jajce | K-4 1000 m |

Igor Safonov is a Soviet sprint canoer who competed in the early 1960s. He won a bronze medal in the K-4 1000 m event at the 1963 ICF Canoe Sprint World Championships in Jajce.
