= Tyrone Ferm =

Swedish sprint canoer

Medal record

Men's canoe sprint

World Championships
Silver medal – second place	1963 Jajce	K-2 10000 m

Tyrone Ferm is a Swedish sprint canoer who competed in the mid-1960s. He won a silver medal in the K-2 10000 m event at the 1963 ICF Canoe Sprint World Championships in Jajce.
