= Wolfgang Finger =

East German canoeist

Medal record

Men's canoe sprint

World Championships
Silver medal – second place	1963 Jajce	K-4 10000 m

Wolfgang Finger is an East German sprint canoeist who competed in the mid-1960s. He won a silver medal in the K-4 10000 m event at the 1963 ICF Canoe Sprint World Championships in Jajce.
