= Igor Lipalit =

Romanian canoeist

Personal information
- Nationality: Romanian
- Born: January 14, 1940
- Died: June 28, 2021

Sport
- Country: Romania
- Sport: canoe sprint
- Event: 1963 ICF Canoe Sprint World Championships C-2 10000 m (bronze medal)

Igor Lipalit (January 14, 1940 – June 28, 2021) was a Romanian sprint canoer who competed in the early 1960s. He won a bronze medal in the C-2 10000 m event at the 1963 ICF Canoe Sprint World Championships in Jajce. Competing in two Summer Olympics, Lipalit earned his best finish of fourth in the C-2 1000 m event at Rome in 1960, where his C-2 partner was Alexe Dumitru. He was also said to have played a role in recruiting Vasile Dîba to CS Dinamo București, where he became a coach.
