= Knappensee =

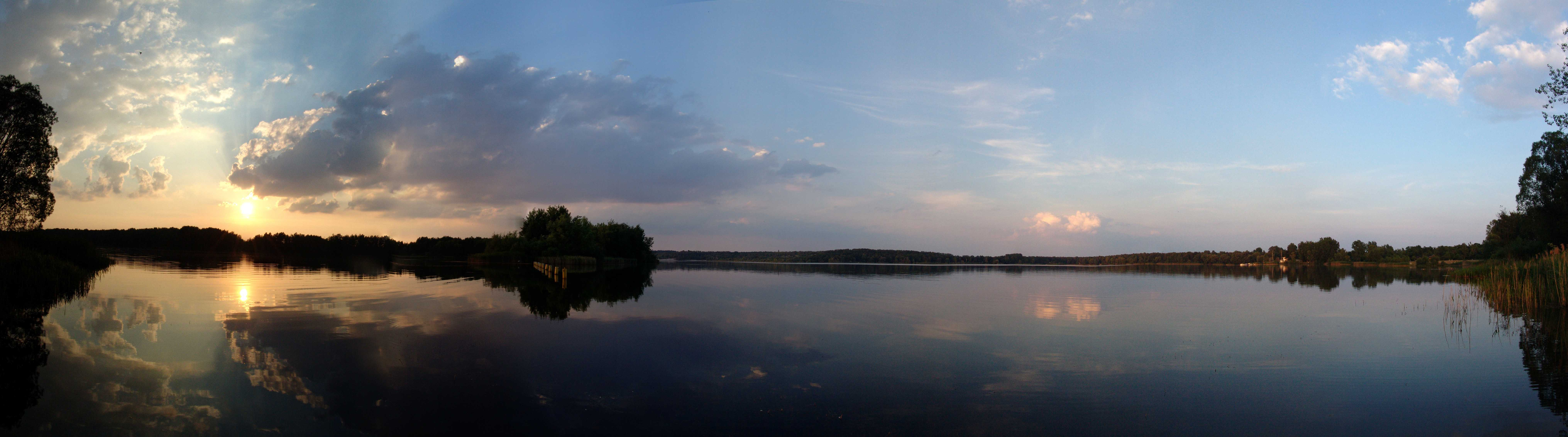
Panorama of the Knappensee

The Knappensee, also known as the Knappenrode reservoir (German: Speicher Knappenrode; Upper Sorbian: Hórnikečanski jězor), is a lake and former open-pit mine located southeast of Hoyerswerda in the state of Saxony, Germany.

The Knappensee is named after the town of Knappenrode to the north and is primarily located within the municipality of Lohsa. The lake was formed by two flood events in May and June 1945, which resulted in the inundation of the Werminghoff lignite open-pit mine.

== See also ==
- Knappensee (municipality)
