= Ion Terente =

Romanian sprint canoer

Medal record

Men's canoe sprint

World Championships
Gold medal – first place	1974 Mexico City	K-2 10000 m
Silver medal – second place	1973 Tampere	K-2 10000 m

Ion Terente is a Romanian sprint canoer who competed in the early to mid-1970s. He won two medals in the K-2 10000 m event at the ICF Canoe Sprint World Championships with a gold in 1974 and a silver in 1973.
