= Vyacheslav Vinnik =

Medal record

Men's canoe sprint

World Championships
Silver medal – second place	1963 Jajce	K-1 4 x 500 m
Bronze medal – third place	1963 Jajce	K-4 1000 m

Vyacheslav Vinnik (born 3 December 1938) is a Soviet sprint canoer who competed in the early 1960s. He won two medals at the 1963 ICF Canoe Sprint World Championships in Jajce with a silver in the K-1 4 x 500 m and a bronze in the K-4 1000 m events. He also won 3 gold and 1 bronze medals in Edmonton, AB, Canada championship in July 2005.
