= Anita Kobuß =

East German canoeist

Personal information
- Born: 13 February 1944 (age 82) Mittweida, Saxony, Germany

Sport
- Sport: Canoeing
- Club: SC Potsdam
Medal record
Women's canoe sprint
Representing East Germany
World Championships
Gold medal – first place	1966 East Berlin	K-2 500 m
Bronze medal – third place	1966 East Berlin	K-1 500 m
Bronze medal – third place	1966 East Berlin	K-4 500 m
Silver medal – second place	1970 Copenhagen	K-4 500 m

Anita Kobuß (born 13 February 1944) is an East German sprint canoeist who competed in the late 1960s. She won a gold medal in the K-2 500 m event and bronze medals in the K-1 500 m and K-4 500 m events at the 1966 ICF Canoe Sprint World Championships in East Berlin.

Kobuß finished fifth in the K-2 500 m event at the 1968 Summer Olympics in Mexico City.
