= Vyacheslav Ionov =

Medal record

Men's canoe sprint

Olympic Games
Gold medal – first place	1964 Tokyo	K-4 1000 m

World Championships
Gold medal – first place	1966 East Berlin	K-4 10000 m

European Championships
Gold medal – first place	1967 Duisburg	K-4 10000 m
Silver medal – second place	1967 Duisburg	K-4 1000 m
Bronze medal – third place	1965 Bucharest	K-4 10000 m

Vyacheslav Ionov (Russian: Вячеслав Ионов; 26 June 1940 – 25 June 2012) was a Soviet sprint canoeist who competed in the mid-1960s. He won a gold in the K-4 1000 m event at the 1964 Summer Olympics in Tokyo. Ionov also won a gold medal in the K-4 10000 m event at the 1966 ICF Canoe Sprint World Championships in East Berlin. He was born in Moscow.
