= Imre Koltai =

Hungarian engineer and politician (1938–2022)

Member of the National Assembly of Hungary
- In office 28 June 1994 – 17 June 1998
- In office 8 June 1980 – 1 May 1990

Personal details
- Born: 15 January 1938 Somogyszil, Hungary
- Died: 23 September 2022 (aged 84) Vác, Hungary
- Party: MSZMP; MSZP
- Education: University of Pannonia; Corvinus University of Budapest; MSZMP Political College
- Occupation: Chemical engineer

Imre Koltai (15 January 1938 – 23 September 2022) was a Hungarian chemical engineer and politician. A member of the Hungarian Socialist Workers' Party and later the Hungarian Socialist Party, he served in the National Assembly from 1980 to 1990 and again from 1994 to 1998.

Koltai died in Vác on 23 September 2022 at the age of 84.
