= Achim Sidorov =

Romanian sprint canoer (born 1936)

Medal record

Men's canoe sprint

World Championships
| Gold medal – first place | 1963 Jajce | C-2 1000 m |
| Silver medal – second place | 1958 Prague | C-2 10000 m |

Achim Sidorov (born 24 August 1936) is a Romanian sprint canoeist who competed in the late 1950s and early 1960s. He won two medals at the ICF Canoe Sprint World Championships with a gold (C-2 1000 m: 1963) and a silver (C-2 10000 m: 1958).

Sidorov also finished fifth in the C-2 1000 m event at the 1964 Summer Olympics in Tokyo.
