= Gerson Coblenz =

Gerson ben Isaac Moses Coblenz (Yiddish: גרשון בן יצחק משה קאָבלענץ; c. 1717 – before 1750) was a French rabbi and writer. He was a student of Rabbi Jacob Reischer, and served as a dayyan in the Jewish community of Metz.

Coblenz's work Kiryat Ḥanah, a collection of responsa which he completed at the age of 25, was published posthumously by his son Jacob in Metz in 1785. His responsa also appear in Reischer's Shevut Yaakov and in Ezekiel Katzenellenbogen's Keneset Yeḥezkel. Coblenz also wrote novellæ on the Turim and corresponded on rabbinical matters with Judah Müller, Samuel Helmann, and Jacob Joshua of Kraków.

== Publications ==
- Kiryat Ḥanah (in Hebrew). Metz. 1785.
