= László Ürögi =

Hungarian sprint canoeist (born 1940)

Medal record

Men's canoe sprint

World Championships
Gold medal – first place	1963 Jajce	K-4 10000 m
Silver medal – second place	1966 East Berlin	K-4 10000 m

László Ürögi (born 1940) is a Hungarian sprint canoeist who competed in the mid to late 1960s. He won two medals in the K-4 10000 m event at the ICF Canoe Sprint World Championships with a gold in 1963 and a silver in 1966.
