= Lavrente Calinov =

Romanian sprint canoer (1936–2018)

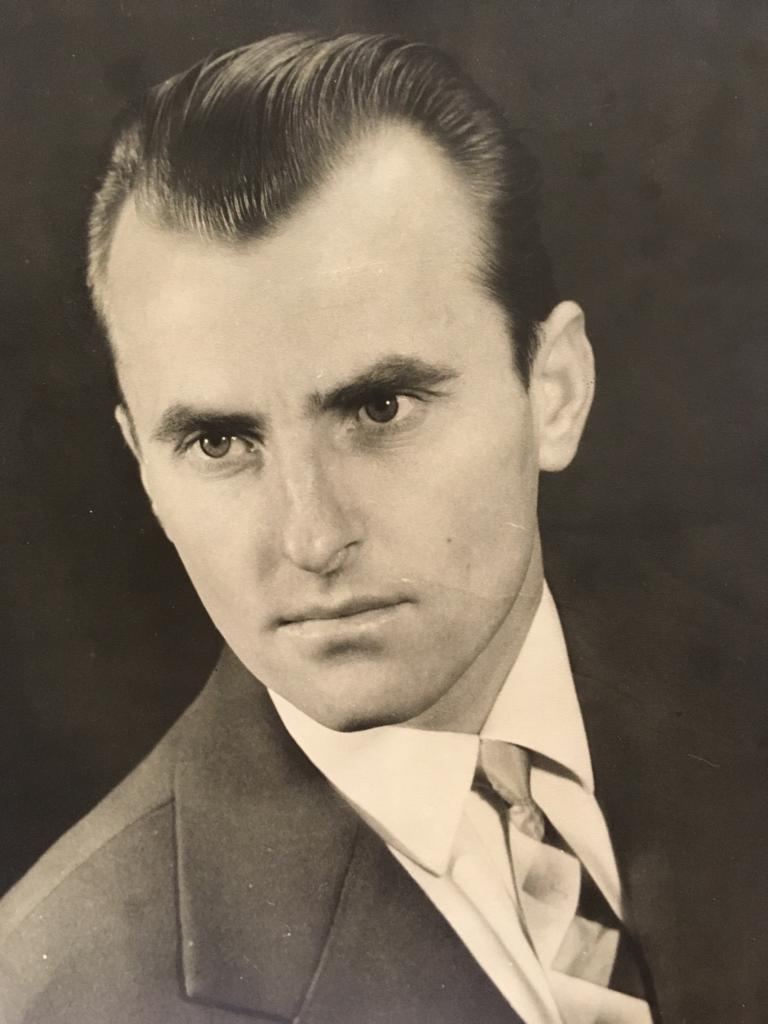

Personal information
- Citizenship: Romania
- Born: August 16, 1936 Mila 23, Tulcea County
- Died: 6 March 2018 (aged 81) București, Romania
- Years active: 1956-1968
- Spouse: Aniuta Calinov

Sport
- Sport: Canoe sprint
- Event: C-2 10000 m
- Club: 1956-1958 CS Steaua; 1958-1968 CS Dinamo București
Medal record
Men's canoe sprint
World Championships
Silver medal – second place	1958 Prague	C-2 10,000 m
European Championships
Bronze medal – third place	Gent 1957	C-2 10,000 m
Silver medal – second place	Duisburg 1959	C-2 1,000 m
Bronze medal – third place	Duisburg 1959	C-2 10,000 m
Bronze medal – third place	Poznan 1961	C-2 10,000 m
Bronze medal – third place	1963 Jajce	C-2 10,000 m

Lavrente Calinov (16 August 1936 – 6 March 2018) was a Romanian sprint canoer who competed in the late 1950s and early 1960s. He won one silver medal in the C-2 10000 m event at the ICF Canoe Sprint World Championships in 1958. He also won 5 silver and bronze medals in the C-2 10000 m event at the European Canoe Sprint World Championships in 1957, 1958, 1960, and 1963.

== Early life ==
Lavrente Calinov was born in the Danube Delta of Romania in the village of Mila 23 accessible only by boat in a Russian speaking Old Believers community known as Lipovans on 16 August 1936. By the time he was 10 he started helping his father Ignat with fishing work in the Danube Delta. At 16 he left home to work in the city of Sulina as a fisherman on the Black Sea until he was drafted in the Romanian conscription-based military service at the time.

== Competitive career ==
Lavrente's career started at the CSA Steaua, which at the time was the sports club ran by the Romanian armed forces, and this is where he won his first two international medals in 1957 and 1958. He transferred two years later to CS Dinamo București where he stayed until the end of his career. His main event was Sprint Canoe 2 (C2), 10,000 m, but he occasionally competed in the C2 1,000 m event. His stance in the sprint canoe was right handed. His main event was not an Olympic event at the time, so he only competed in World and European championships, never in the Olympics. He retired from the sport in 1968.

== Personal life ==
He married Aniuta Pogor in 1963 and had two children, Iulian Doroftei born in 1967 and Olga born in 1972. Calinov died on 6 March 2018, at the age of 81.
