= Vasilie Nicoară =

Romanian canoeist

Medal record

Men's canoe sprint

World Championships
Gold medal – first place	1963 Jajce	K-1 4 x 500 m
Gold medal – first place	1963 Jajce	K-2 500 m
Gold medal – first place	1963 Jajce	K-2 1000 m
Silver medal – second place	1963 Jajce	K-4 1000 m
Bronze medal – third place	1966 East Berlin	K-1 4 x 500 m

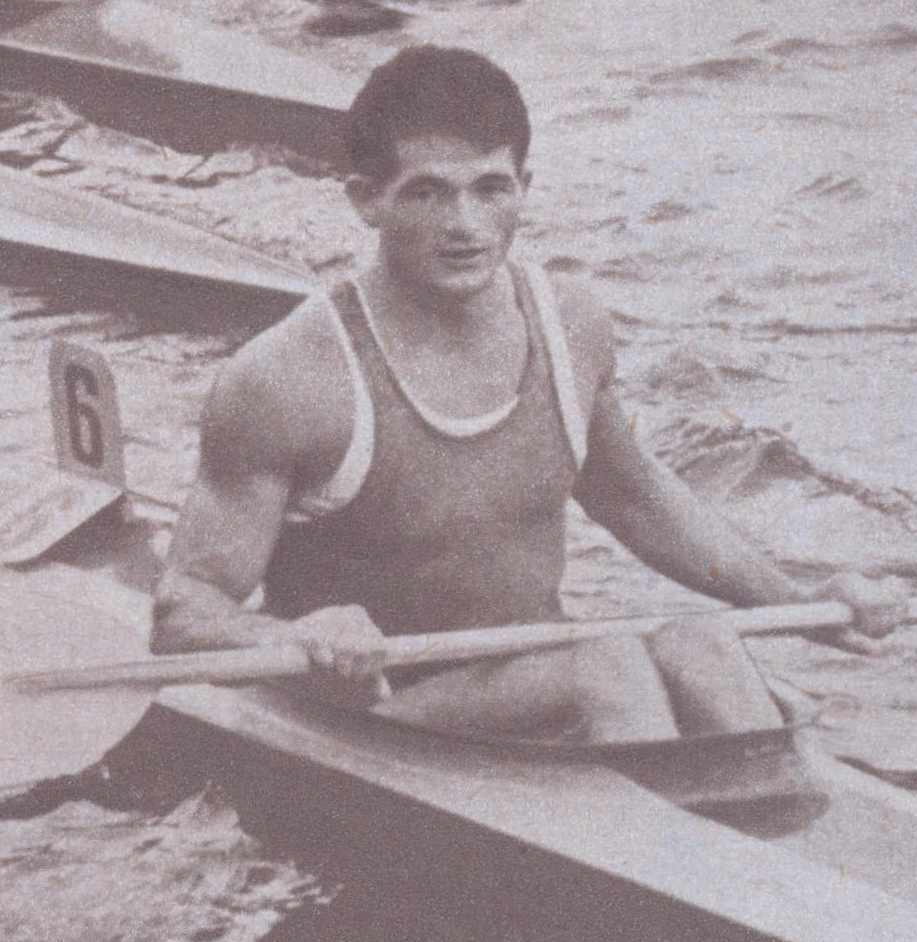

Vasile Nicoară (13 June 1937 – 1978) was a Romanian sprint canoeist who competed in 1960s. He won five medals at the ICF Canoe Sprint World Championships with three golds (K-1 4 x 500 m, K-2 500 m, K-2 1000 m: all 1963), a silver (K-4 1000 m: 1963), and a bronze (K-1 4 x 500 m: 1966).

Nicoară also competed in two Summer Olympics, earning his best finish of fourth in the K-2 1000 m event at Tokyo in 1964.
