= Yuriy Kabanov =

Soviet canoeist

Medal record

Men's canoe sprint

World Championships
Gold medal – first place	1966 East Berlin	K-1 4 x 500 m

Yuriy Kabanov (12 March 1939 in Novgorod – 8 September 2014) was a Soviet sprint canoeist who competed in the mid to late 1960s. He won a gold medal in the K-1 4 x 500 m event at the 1966 ICF Canoe Sprint World Championships in East Berlin.
