= Vinnikov =

Vinnikov (Russian: Винников) and Vinnikova (Russian: Винникова) is a Russian surname. Notable people with the surname include:

- Alexander Vinnikov (born 1955), Russian politician
- Anastasia Vinnikova (born 1991), Belarusian singer
- Isaak Natanovich Vinnikov (1897-1973), Russian Jewish Arabist
- Ivan Vinnikov (born 1964), Russian footballer
- Zino Vinnikov (born 1943), Russian-Dutch violinist
