= Otto Koltai =

Hungarian canoeist

Medal record

Men's canoe sprint

World Championships
Gold medal – first place	1963 Jajce	K-4 10000 m

Otto Koltai is a Hungarian sprint canoer who competed in the early 1960s. He won a gold medal in the K-4 10000 m event at the 1963 ICF Canoe Sprint World Championships in Jajce.
