= Knappensee (municipality) =

Coordinates: 51°22′N 14°19′E

Knappensee (German) or Hórnikečanski jězor (Upper Sorbian) was a municipality in the northeastern part of Saxony, Germany, east of Hoyerswerda.

It was formed in 1995 by the merger of the three municipalities Groß Särchen, Koblenz and Wartha, and was named after the lake Knappensee.

In 2004 it was disbanded. Groß Särchen and Koblenz became parts of Lohsa, Wartha became a part of Königswartha.
