= Ivan Patzaichin =

Romanian canoe racing coach and sprint canoeist (1949–2021)

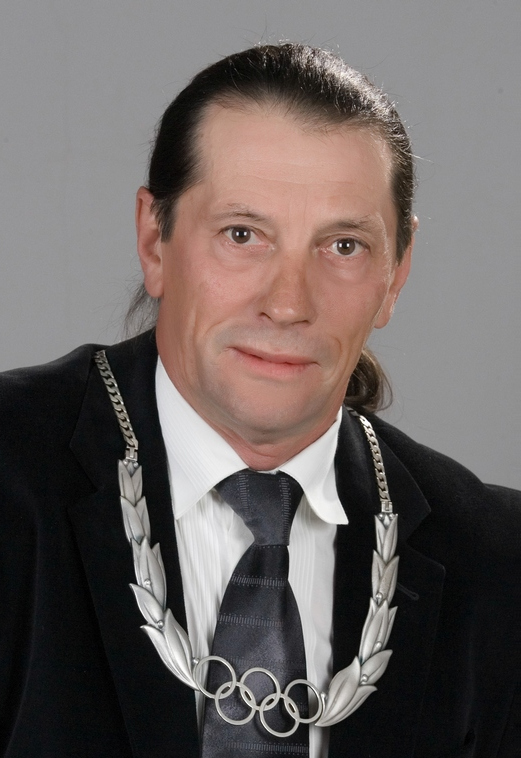
- Patzaichin with the Olympic Order in 1990

Personal information
- Born: 26 November 1949 Crișan, Romania
- Died: 5 September 2021 (aged 71) Bucharest, Romania
- Resting place: Bellu Cemetery
- Height: 176 cm (5 ft 9 in)
- Weight: 79 kg (174 lb)

Sport
- Sport: Canoe sprint
- Club: CS Dinamo București
- Coached by: Octavian Mercurian
Medal record
Representing Romania
Olympic Games
| Gold medal – first place | 1968 Mexico City | C-2 1000 m |
| Gold medal – first place | 1972 Munich | C-1 1000 m |
| Gold medal – first place | 1980 Moscow | C-2 1000 m |
| Gold medal – first place | 1984 Los Angeles | C-2 1000 m |
| Silver medal – second place | 1972 Munich | C-2 1000 m |
| Silver medal – second place | 1980 Moscow | C-2 500 m |
| Silver medal – second place | 1984 Los Angeles | C-2 500 m |
World Championships
| Gold medal – first place | 1970 Copenhagen | C-2 1000 m |
| Gold medal – first place | 1973 Tampere | C-1 1000 m |
| Gold medal – first place | 1977 Sofia | C-1 1000 m |
| Gold medal – first place | 1978 Belgrade | C-1 10000 m |
| Gold medal – first place | 1979 Duisburg | C-2 500 m |
| Gold medal – first place | 1981 Nottingham | C-2 1000 m |
| Gold medal – first place | 1982 Belgrade | C-2 10000 m |
| Gold medal – first place | 1983 Tampere | C-2 1000 m |
| Silver medal – second place | 1971 Belgrade | C-2 1000 m |
| Silver medal – second place | 1975 Belgrade | C-1 1000 m |
| Silver medal – second place | 1981 Nottingham | C-2 10000 m |
| Silver medal – second place | 1983 Tampere | C-2 10000 m |
| Bronze medal – third place | 1971 Belgrade | C-1 500 m |
| Bronze medal – third place | 1973 Tampere | C-1 500 m |
| Bronze medal – third place | 1974 Mexico City | C-1 500 m |
| Bronze medal – third place | 1974 Mexico City | C-1 1000 m |
| Bronze medal – third place | 1974 Mexico City | C-1 10000 m |
| Bronze medal – third place | 1977 Sofia | C-1 10000 m |
| Bronze medal – third place | 1978 Belgrade | C-1 1000 m |
| Bronze medal – third place | 1979 Duisburg | C-1 1000 m |
| Bronze medal – third place | 1979 Duisburg | C-1 10000 m |
European Championships

Ivan Patzaichin (Romanian pronunciation: [iˈvan paˈt͡sajkin]; 26 November 1949 – 5 September 2021) was a Romanian canoe racing coach and sprint canoeist. He took part in all major competitions between 1968 and 1984, including five consecutive Olympics, and won seven Olympic and 22 world championship medals, including four Olympic gold medals. This makes him the most decorated Romanian canoeist of all time.

He later worked as a canoeing coach, attending five more Olympics in this capacity. In 1990 he was awarded the Olympic Order, and in 2006 a nationwide poll included him on the list of 100 Greatest Romanians of all time.

== Biography ==
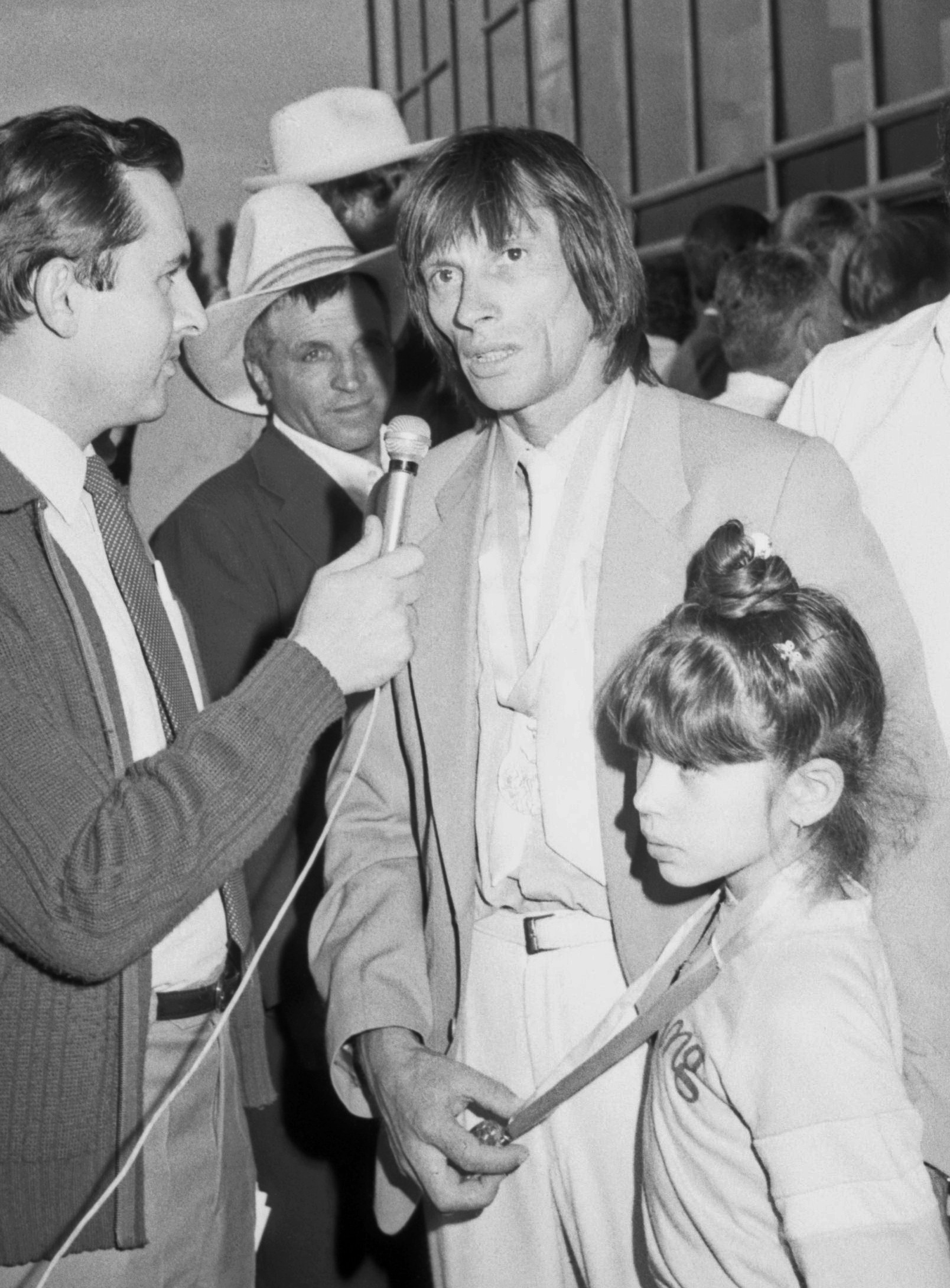
Patzaichin giving an interview alongside his daughter after the 1984 Olympics

Patzaichin was born in a Russian Lipovan family in the village Mila 23, Tulcea County. His father Vicol was a fisherman and his mother Alexandra was a dressmaker. He took up canoeing at an early age inspired by his grandfather, and decided to pursue a canoeing career after watching a television broadcast of two canoers from his village, more specifically Vicol Calabiciov and Serghei Covaliov, winning the 1966 world title in doubles. In 1967, aged 18, he moved to the Romanian capital Bucharest, where he joined the club Dinamo. One year later, in 1968, he was included in the national team and won an Olympic gold medal, paddling with Covaliov.

At the 1972 Olympics, Patzaichin broke his paddle and placed last in the singles heats. Yet he managed to finish the race, paddling with a piece of the floor board that he removed from the inside of his canoe, and was included in the repechage. He eventually won the repechage and the final race. In the doubles, he again teamed with Covaliov and placed second, just 0.03 seconds behind the winners.

Patzaichin spent his entire career with Dinamo, first as a trainee and competitor, paddling 4,000–5,000 km per year in his prime, and then as a coach. His most famous trainees were Olympic champions Florin Popescu and Mitică Pricop. A statue of Patzaichin is installed outside of the Dinamo main office. Besides canoeing, he also founded the association Ivan Patzachin – Mila 23 and launched the national project Rowmania aiming to promote heritage tourism and other outdoor activities. Patzaichin owned his own line of clothing made from natural products.

In 1976, Patzaichin married Georgiana, a woman he met in August 1975. They have a daughter Ivona Beatrice (born c. 1979), who works at the National Commission of Hospital Accreditation.

He was involved in an animation project in 2020, dubbing into Romanian the character Scroop in the Disney movie Treasure Planet.

Ivan Patzaichin died on 5 September 2021, aged 71, in Bucharest, after having been hospitalized for three months with lung cancer.

== Awards and honors ==
- Silver Olympic Order (1990)
- Officer of the Order of Faithful Service (Romania, 2000)
- 1st class Order of Sports Merit (Romanian: Meritul Sportiv, 2008)
- Military rank brigadier general (1 December 2004)
- Nihil Sine Deo (2010)

== See also ==
- List of multiple Olympic gold medalists
