= Wolfgang Lange (canoeist) =

German canoeist (1938–2022)

Medal record

Men's canoe sprint

World Championships
Gold medal – first place	1963 Jajce	K-4 1000 m
Silver medal – second place	1963 Jajce	K-2 1000 m
Bronze medal – third place	1963 Jajce	K-1 4 x 500 m
Bronze medal – third place	1966 East Berlin	K-4 10000 m

Wolfgang Lange (3 July 1938 – 29 October 2022) was an East German sprint canoeist who competed in the 1960s. He won four medals at the ICF Canoe Sprint World Championships with a gold (K-4 1000 m: 1963) a silver (K-2 1000 m: 1963), and two bronzes (K-1 4 x 500 m: 1963, K-4 10000 m: 1966).

Lange also competed in two Summer Olympics, earning his best finish of seventh in the K-1 1000 m event at Rome in 1960.
