= Marion Knobba =

Medal record

Women's canoe sprint

World Championships
Bronze medal – third place	1963 Jajce	K-4 500 m

Marion Knobba is an East German sprint canoer who competed in the mid-1960s. She won a bronze medal in the K-4 500 m event at the 1963 ICF Canoe Sprint World Championships in Jajce.
