= Siegwart Karbe =

Medal record

Men's canoe sprint

World Championships
Silver medal – second place	1963 Jajce	K-4 10000 m
Bronze medal – third place	1966 East Berlin	K-4 10000 m

Siegwart Karbe is an East German sprint canoeist who competed in the mid to late 1960s. He won two medals in the K-4 10000 m event at the ICF Canoe Sprint World Championships with a silver in 1963 and a bronze in 1966.
