= Vladimir Obraztsov =

Soviet canoeist

Medal record

Men's canoe sprint

World Championships
Bronze medal – third place	1966 East Berlin	K-2 500 m

European Championships
Gold medal – first place	1967 Duisburg	K-2 500 m
Silver medal – second place	1969 Moscow	K-2 500 m

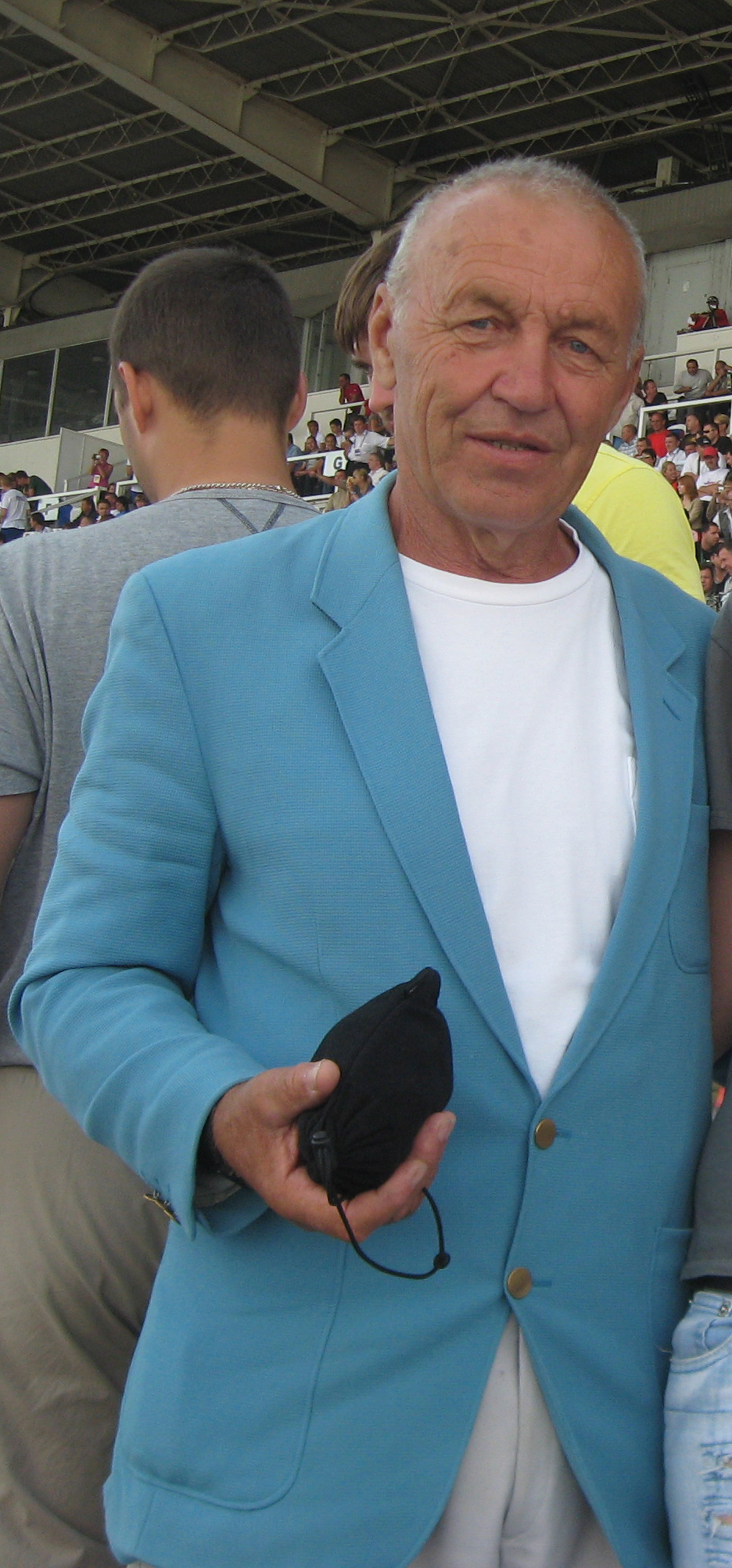
Vladimir Obraztsov

Vladimir Obraztsov (Russian: Владимир Образцов; born January 25, 1940) is a Soviet sprint canoeist who competed in the late 1960s. He won a bronze medal in the K-2 500 m event at the 1966 ICF Canoe Sprint World Championships in East Berlin.
