= Mariya Shubina =

Soviet canoeist (1930–2025)

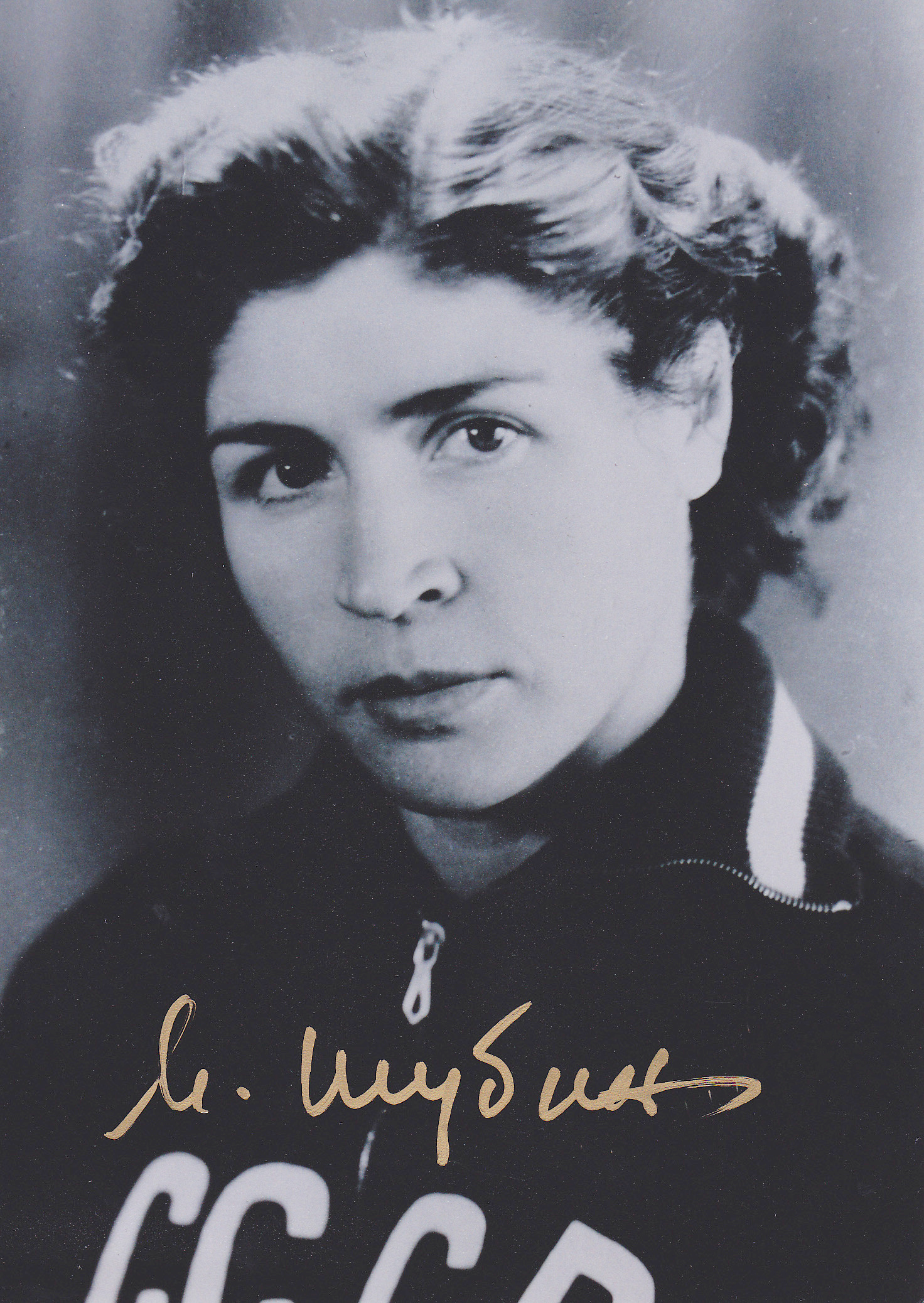
- Shubina in 1960

Personal information
- Born: 12 May 1930 Protasovo, Ichalkovsky District, Mordovian Autonomous Oblast, Middle Volga Krai, Russian SFSR, USSR
- Died: 20 April 2025 (aged 94)
- Height: 1.67 m (5 ft 6 in)
- Weight: 65 kg (143 lb)

Sport
- Sport: Canoe sprint
- Club: Spartak Vladivostok
Medal record
Representing the Soviet Union
Olympic Games
Gold medal – first place	1960 Rome	K-2 500 m
World Championships
Gold medal – first place	1958 Prague	K-2 500 m
Gold medal – first place	1963 Jajce	K-1 500 m
Gold medal – first place	1963 Jajce	K-4 500 m
Silver medal – second place	1963 Jajce	K-2 500 m
Gold medal – first place	1966 East Berlin	K-4 500 m
Silver medal – second place	1966 East Berlin	K-2 500 m

Mariya Timofeyevna Shubina (Russian: Мария Тимофеевна Шубина; 12 May 1930 – 20 April 2025) was a Soviet sprint canoeist who competed from the late 1950s to the late 1960s. She won the K-2 500 m gold medal at the 1960 Summer Olympics in Rome. Shubina also won six medals at the ICF Canoe Sprint World Championships with four golds (K-1 500 m: 1963, K-2 500 m: 1958, K-4 500 m: 1963, 1966) and two silvers (K-2 500 m: 1963, 1966).

Shubina was born into a family of telephone communications engineers in Mordovia. In 1944 she enrolled in a gynecology school, and after graduating worked at a regional hospital. A keen cross-country skier and runner, she used to ski or run to work. In 1950 she enrolled in Kazan State Medical University, where she continued training and competing in ski and athletics. Her first canoe race was accidental – she was asked to replace a missing teammate; she did not even know how to swim. A canoe coach noticed her then and convinced her to start training.

In 1956 Shubina graduated from the Kazan University, and later studied sport medicine in Saint Petersburg. Beginning in 1964 she lived in Volgograd, together with her husband and sons Konstantin and Mikhail. In 1975 she defended a PhD in medicine.

Shubina died on 20 April 2025, at the age of 94.
