= Vasiliy Kalyagin =

Soviet canoeist

Medal record

Men's canoe sprint

World Championships
Silver medal – second place	1970 Copenhagen	C-2 10000 m

Vasiliy Kalyagin is a Soviet sprint canoer who competed in the late 1960s and early 1970s. He won a silver medal in the C-2 10000 m event at the 1970 ICF Canoe Sprint World Championships in Copenhagen.
