= Andrei Contolenco =

Romanian canoeist (born 1938)

Medal record

Men's canoe sprint

World Championships
Silver medal – second place	1963 Jajce	K-4 1000 m

Andrei Conţolenco (born June 22, 1938) is a former Romanian sprint canoer who competed in the 1960s. He won a silver medal in the K-4 1000 m event at the 1963 ICF Canoe Sprint World Championships in Jajce.

Conţolenco also finished seventh in the K-1 1000 m event at the 1968 Summer Olympics in Mexico City.
