= Valeriy Drybas =

Medal record

Men's canoe sprint

World Championships
Silver medal – second place	1966 East Berlin	C-2 10000 m
Silver medal – second place	1970 Copenhagen	C-2 10000 m

Valeriy Drybas is a Soviet sprint canoeist who competed in the late 1960s and early 1970s. He won two silver medals in the C-2 10000 m event at the ICF Canoe Sprint World Championships, earning them in 1966 and 1970.
