= Mikhail Zamotin =

Medal record

Men's canoe sprint

Olympic Games
| Bronze medal – third place | 1968 Mexico City | C-2 1000 m |

World Championships
| Gold medal – first place | 1963 Jajce | C-1 10000 m |
| Silver medal – second place | 1963 Jajce | C-2 1000 m |
| Bronze medal – third place | 1966 East Berlin | C-1 10000 m |

Mikhail Zamotin (Russian: Михаил Замотин; born 14 November 1937 in Leningrad) is a Soviet-born, Russian sprint canoeist who competed in the 1960s. At the 1968 Summer Olympics in Mexico City, he won a bronze medal in the C-2 1000 m event.

Zamotin also won a complete set of medals at the ICF Canoe Sprint World Championships with a gold (C-1 10000 m: 1963), a silver (C-2 1000 m: 1963), and a bronze (C-1 10000 m: 1966).
