= Elke Felten =

German canoeist

Medal record

Women's canoe sprint

World Championships
Silver medal – second place	1963 Jajce	K-4 500 m

Erika "Elke" Felten (born 13 July 1943) is a West German sprint canoer who competed in the mid-1960s. She finished fourth in the K-1 500 m event at the 1964 Summer Olympics in Tokyo while competing for the United Team of Germany, and won a silver medal in the K-4 500 m event at the 1963 ICF Canoe Sprint World Championships in Jajce.
