= László Fábián (canoeist) =

Hungarian canoeist (1936–2018)

Medal record

Men's canoe sprint

Representing Hungary

Olympic Games
Gold medal – first place	1956 Melbourne	K-2 10000 m

World Championships
Gold medal – first place	1958 Prague	K-2 10000 m
Gold medal – first place	1963 Jajce	K-2 10000 m
Gold medal – first place	1963 Jajce	K-4 10000 m
Gold medal – first place	1966 East Berlin	K-2 10000 m
Silver medal – second place	1966 East Berlin	K-4 10000 m

Laszlo Fabian

László Fábián (10 July 1936 in Budapest – 10 August 2018) was a Hungarian sprint canoeist who competed from the late 1950s to the late 1960s. He won a gold medal in the K-2 10000 m at the 1956 Summer Olympics in Melbourne. He was Jewish.

Fábián also won five medals at the ICF Canoe Sprint World Championships with four golds (K-2 10000 m: 1958, 1963, 1966; K-4 10000 m: 1963) and one silver (K-4 10000 m: 1966).

== See also ==
- List of select Jewish canoeists
