= Helga Mühlberg-Ulze =

East German athlete

Medal record

Women's canoe sprint

World Championships
Gold medal – first place	1966 East Berlin	K-2 500 m
Bronze medal – third place	1963 Jajce	K-4 500 m
Bronze medal – third place	1966 East Berlin	K-4 500 m

Helga Mühlberg-Ulze is an East German sprint canoeist who competed in the early to mid-1960s. She won three medals at the ICF Canoe Sprint World Championships with a gold (K-2 500 m: 1966), and two bronzes (K-4 500 m: 1963, 1966). Ulze retired at the end of the 1968 season and afterwards focussed on youth development work.
