= Georgiy Karyukhin =

Medal record

Men's canoe sprint

World Championships
Gold medal – first place	1966 East Berlin	K-1 4 x 500 m
Bronze medal – third place	1966 East Berlin	K-2 500 m
Bronze medal – third place	1966 East Berlin	K-4 1000 m

Georgiy Karyukhin (Russian: Георгий Карюхин; born September 15, 1939) is a Soviet sprint canoeist who competed in the late 1960s. He won three medals at the 1966 ICF Canoe Sprint World Championships in East Berlin with a gold (K-1 4 x 500 m) and two bronzes (K-2 500 m, K-4 1000 m).

Karyuchin also competed in the K-4 1000 m event at the 1968 Summer Olympics in Mexico City, but was eliminated in the semifinals.
