= Heinz Büker =

German canoe racer

Medal record

Men's canoe sprint

Olympic Games
| Bronze medal – third place | 1964 Tokyo | K-2 1000 m |

World Championships
| Silver medal – second place | 1966 East Berlin | K-2 500 m |
| Bronze medal – third place | 1963 Jajce | K-2 500 m |

Heinz Büker (born 6 July 1941) was a West German sprint canoeist who competed in the mid-1960s. He won a bronze medal in the K-2 1000 m event at the 1964 Summer Olympics in Tokyo for the United Team of Germany.

Büker also won two medals for West Germany in the K-2 500 m at the ICF Canoe Sprint World Championships with a silver in 1966 and a bronze in 1963.
