= Holger Zander =

German canoeist (born 1943)

Medal record

Men's canoe sprint

Olympic Games
Silver medal – second place	1964 Tokyo	K-4 1000 m
Bronze medal – third place	1964 Tokyo	K-2 1000 m

World Championships
Silver medal – second place	1966 East Berlin	K-2 500 m
Bronze medal – third place	1963 Jajce	K-2 500 m

Holger Zander (born 24 May 1943) was a West German-German sprint canoeist who competed in the 1960s. Competing in two Summer Olympics, he won two medals at Tokyo in 1964 with a silver in the K-4 1000 m and a bronze in the K-2 1000 m.

Zander also won two medals for West Germany in the K-2 500 m event at the ICF Canoe Sprint World Championships with a silver in 1966 and a bronze in 1963.
