= Detlef Lewe =

German canoe racer

Medal record

Men's canoe sprint

Representing West Germany

Olympic Games
Silver medal – second place	1968 Mexico City	C-1 1000 m
Bronze medal – third place	1972 Munich	C-1 1000 m

World Championships
Gold medal – first place	1966 East Berlin	C-1 1000 m
Gold medal – first place	1971 Belgrade	C-1 500 m
Gold medal – first place	1971 Belgrade	C-1 1000 m
Silver medal – second place	1963 Jajce	C-1 1000 m

Detlef Lewe (20 June 1939, Dortmund – 1 October 2008) was a West German-German sprint canoeist who competed from the late 1950s to the early 1970s.

== Sporting career ==
Competing in four Summer Olympics, Lewe earned two medals in the C-1 1000 m event with a silver in 1968 and a bronze in 1972. He also won four canoe sprint world championship medals with three golds (C-1 500 m: 1971, C-1 1000 m: 1966, 1971) and one silver (C-1 1000 m: 1963). Lewe also carried the West German flag at the opening ceremonies of the 1972 Summer Olympics in Munich.

== Later in life ==
After the Olympics, Dortmund-born Lewe moved to Munich and became a butcher, a business he ran until prior to his 2008 death. His shop was located near the Olympic area where the 1972 Summer Olympics were held. Lewe died in Munich after a brief illness.
