= Anatoli Grishin (canoeist) =

Medal record

Men's canoe sprint
Gold medal – first place	1964 Tokyo	K-4 1000 m

World Championships
Gold medal – first place	1966 East Berlin	K-4 10000 m
Bronze medal – third place	1963 Jajce	K-2 1000 m

Anatoli Kuzmich Grishin (Russian: Анатолий Кузьмич Гришин; 8 July 1939 – 14 June 2016) was a Soviet sprint canoeist who competed in the mid-1960s.

He won a gold medal in the K-4 1000 m event at the 1964 Summer Olympics in Tokyo.

Grishin also won two medals at the ICF Canoe Sprint World Championships with a gold medal (K-4 10000 m: 1966) and a bronze medal (K-2 1000 m: 1963).

Grishin died on 14 June 2016, at the age of 76.
