= Nikolai Chuzhikov =

Soviet canoeist (1938 – 2022)

Personal information
- Born: 5 May 1938 Makeshkino, Belgorod Oblast, Russian SFSR, Soviet Union
- Died: 9 June 2022 (aged 84)
Medal record
Men's canoe sprint
Olympic Games
Gold medal – first place	1964 Tokyo	K-4 1000 m
World Championships
Gold medal – first place	1966 East Berlin	K-4 10000 m
Bronze medal – third place	1963 Jajce	K-2 1000 m

Nikolai Chuzhikov (Russian: Николай Фёдорович Чужиков, romanized: Nikolaj Fëdorovič Čužikov sometimes listed as Nikoly Zhushikov or Nikolay Zhuzhikov, 5 May 1938 – 9 June 2022) was a Soviet sprint canoeist who competed in the 1960s. Competing in two Summer Olympics, he won a gold in the K-4 1000 m at Tokyo in 1964. Chuzhikov also won two medals at the ICF Canoe Sprint World Championships with a gold (K-4 10000 m: 1966) and a bronze (K-2 1000 m: 1963).
