= Antonina Seredina =

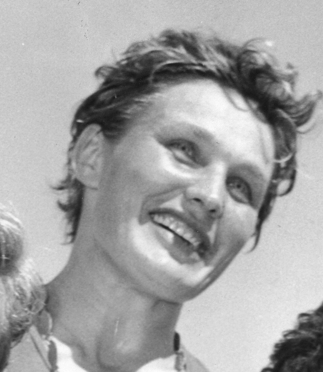
- Seredina at the 1960 Olympics

Personal information
- Born: 23 December 1929 Lovtsovo, Tver Oblast, Russian SFSR, Soviet Union
- Died: 2 September 2016 (aged 86)
- Height: 164 cm (5 ft 5 in)
- Weight: 66 kg (146 lb)

Sport
- Sport: Canoe sprint
- Event: 500 m
- Club: Spartak Moscow
Medal record
Representing the Soviet Union
Olympic Games
Gold medal – first place	1960 Rome	K-1 500 m
Gold medal – first place	1960 Rome	K-2 500 m
Bronze medal – third place	1968 Mexico City	K-2 500 m
World Championships
Gold medal – first place	1963 Jajce	K-4 500 m
Gold medal – first place	1966 East Berlin	K-4 500 m
Silver medal – second place	1958 Prague	K-1 500 m
Silver medal – second place	1958 Prague	K-2 500 m
Silver medal – second place	1966 East Berlin	K-2 500 m

Antonina Alexandrovna Seredina (Russian: Антонина Александровна Середина; 23 December 1929 – 2 September 2016) was a Russian sprint canoeist. She won the 500 m singles and doubles events at the 1960 Olympics, and placed third in the doubles in 1968 and fourth in 1964. She also won five medals at the ICF Canoe Sprint World Championships with two golds (K-4 500 m: 1963, 1966) and three silvers (K-1 500 m: 1958, K-2 500 m: 1958, 1966).
