= Renate Breuer =

German canoeist

Medal record

Women's canoe sprint

Olympic Games
Silver medal – second place	1968 Mexico City	K-1 500 m

World Championships
Gold medal – first place	1970 Copenhagen	K-2 500 m
Silver medal – second place	1966 East Berlin	K-4 500 m
Silver medal – second place	1971 Belgrade	K-4 500 m

Renate Breuer (born 1 December 1939 in Berlin) is a West German sprint canoeist who competed from the late 1960s to the early 1970s. Competing in two Summer Olympics, she won a silver medal in the K-1 500 m event at Mexico City in 1968.

Breuer also won three medals at the ICF Canoe Sprint World Championships with a gold (K-2 500 m: 1970) and two silvers (K-4 500 m: 1966, 1971).
