= Serghei Covaliov =

Romanian canoeist

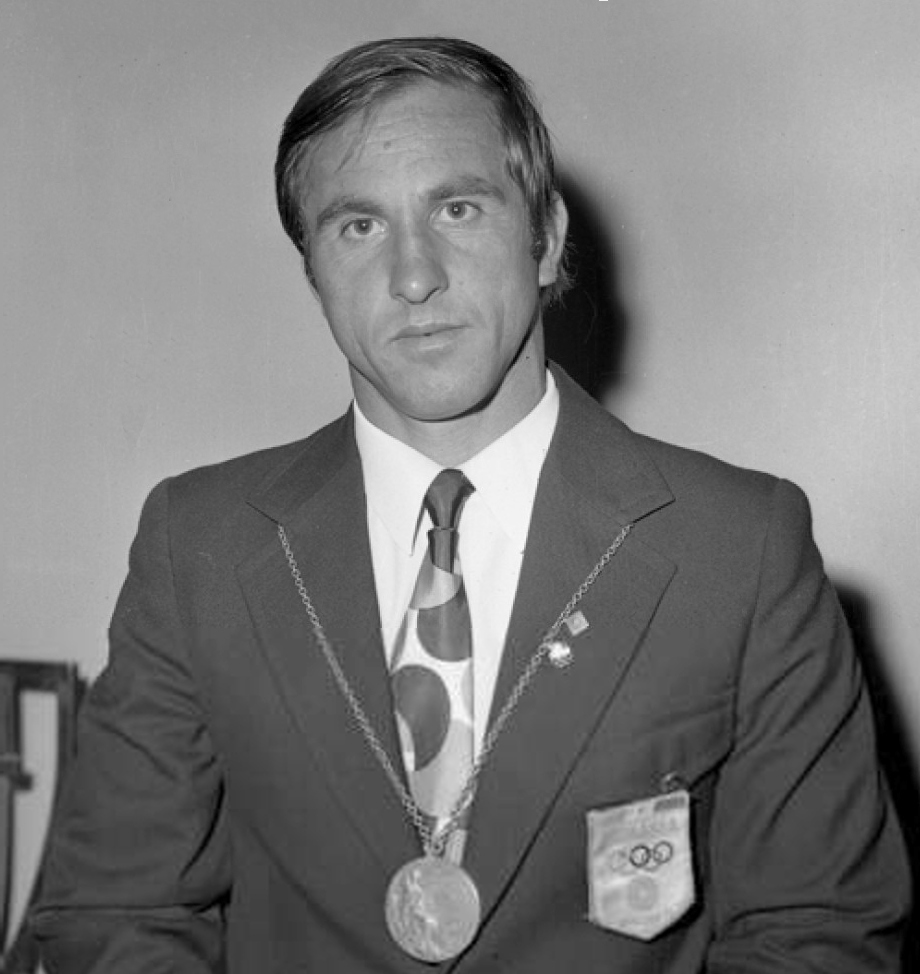

Personal information
- Born: 14 October 1944 Mila 23, Romania
- Died: 16 May 2011 (aged 66) Letea, Romania
- Height: 172 cm (5 ft 8 in)
- Weight: 75 kg (165 lb)

Sport
- Sport: Canoe sprint
Medal record
Representing Romania
Olympic Games
Gold medal – first place	1968 Mexico City	C-2 1000 m
Silver medal – second place	1972 Munich	C-2 1000 m
World Championships
Gold medal – first place	1966 East Berlin	C-2 1000 m
Gold medal – first place	1970 Copenhagen	C-2 1000 m
Silver medal – second place	1971 Belgrade	C-2 1000 m
Bronze medal – third place	1971 Belgrade	C-2 10000 m

Serghei Covaliov (14 October 1944 – 16 May 2011) was a Romanian sprint canoeist. He was the child of Mr. and Mrs. Simeon Covaliov. He mostly competed in doubles together with Ivan Patzaichin, a Russian-born fellow Lipovan in the same village. They won a gold and a silver medal at the 1968 and 1972 Olympics, respectively, missing the first place in 1972 by 0.03 seconds. At the world championships they won one gold, one silver and one bronze medal in 1970–1971, while Covaliov also had a gold medal in 1966 with Vicol Calabiciov, another canoer from his village. Covaliov died aged 66 after suffering a severe concussion while canoeing.
