= Haralambie Ivanov =

Romanian canoeist

Medal record

Men's canoe sprint

Representing Romania

Olympic Games
Silver medal – second place	1968 Mexico City	K-4 1000 m

World Championships
Gold medal – first place	1963 Jajce	K-1 4 x 500 m
Gold medal – first place	1963 Jajce	K-2 500 m
Gold medal – first place	1963 Jajce	K-2 1000 m
Gold medal – first place	1966 East Berlin	K-4 1000 m
Silver medal – second place	1963 Jajce	K-4 1000 m
Bronze medal – third place	1966 East Berlin	K-1 4 x 500 m

Haralambie Ivanov (23 February 1941 – 22 August 2004) was a Romanian sprint canoeist who competed in the mid to late 1960s. Competing in two Summer Olympics, he won a silver in the K-4 1000 m event at Mexico City in 1968. Ivanov also won six medals at the ICF Canoe Sprint World Championships with four golds (K-1 4 x 500 m: 1963, K-2 500 m: 1963, K-2 1000 m: 1963, K-4 1000 m: 1966), a silver (K-4 1000 m: 1963), and a bronze (K-1 4 x 500 m: 1966). He died in Crișan, Tulcea in 2004.
