= Annemarie Zimmermann =

German canoeist (born 1940)

Personal information
- Nationality: German
- Born: 10 June 1940 (age 86) Lendersdorf, Rhine Province, Germany

Sport
- Sport: Canoe sprint
Medal record
Women's canoe sprint
Olympic Games
Gold medal – first place	1964 Tokyo	K-2 500 m
Gold medal – first place	1968 Mexico City	K-2 500 m
World Championships
Gold medal – first place	1963 Jajce	K-2 500 m
Silver medal – second place	1963 Jajce	K-4 500 m

Annemarie Zimmermann (German pronunciation: [ˈʔanəmaˌʁiː ˈt͡sɪmɐˌman]; born 10 June 1940 in Lendersdorf) is a West German canoe sprinter who competed in the 1960s. Competing in two Summer Olympics, she won two gold medals in the K-2 500 m event, earning them in 1964 and 1968.

Zimmermann also won two medals at the 1963 ICF Canoe Sprint World Championships with a gold in the K-2 500 m and a silver in the K-4 500 m events.
