= Aurel Vernescu =

Romanian sprint kayaker

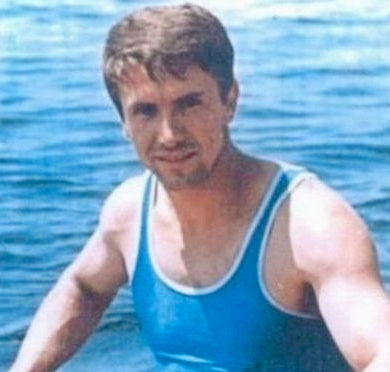

Personal information
- Born: 23 January 1939 Bucharest, Romania
- Died: 1 December 2008 (aged 69) Bucharest, Romania
- Height: 188 cm (6 ft 2 in)
- Weight: 88 kg (194 lb)

Sport
- Sport: Canoe sprint
- Club: Dinamo București
Medal record
Representing Romania
Olympic Games
Silver medal – second place	1972 Munich	K-4 1000 m
Bronze medal – third place	1964 Tokyo	K-1 1000 m
Bronze medal – third place	1964 Tokyo	K-4 1000 m
World Championships
Gold medal – first place	1963 Jajce	K-1 500 m
Gold medal – first place	1963 Jajce	K-1 4×500 m
Silver medal – second place	1963 Jajce	K-1 1000 m
Silver medal – second place	1963 Jajce	K-2 500 m
Gold medal – first place	1966 East Berlin	K-1 500 m
Gold medal – first place	1966 East Berlin	K-2 500 m
Bronze medal – third place	1966 East Berlin	K-1 4×500 m
Silver medal – second place	1966 East Berlin	K-2 1000 m
Silver medal – second place	1970 Copenhagen	K-1 4×500 m
Silver medal – second place	1970 Copenhagen	K-2 500 m
Silver medal – second place	1971 Belgrade	K-1 4×500 m

Aurel Vernescu (23 January 1939 – 1 December 2008) was a Romanian sprint kayaker. He competed at the 1960, 1964, 1968 and 1972 Olympics and won three medals with a silver in 1972 in the K-4 1000 m and two bronze medals in 1964 in the K-1 1000 m and K-4 1000 m events. He served as a flag bearer for Romania at the 1964, 1968 and 1972 Olympics.

Vernescu also won eleven medals at the ICF Canoe Sprint World Championships with four golds (K-1 500 m: 1963, 1966; K-1 4×500 m: 1963, K-2 500 m: 1966), five silvers (K-1 1000 m: 1963, K-1 4×500 m: 1970, 1971, K-2 500 m: 1966, 1970; K-2 1000 m: 1966), and one bronze (K-1 4×500 m: 1966).

Vernescu took up kayaking aged 13 and in total won 42 national titles. He retired from competitions in 1972 to become a kayaking coach and administrator.
