= Mihály Hesz =

Hungarian canoeist (born 1943)

Medal record

Men's canoe sprint

Olympic Games
Gold medal – first place	1968 Mexico City	K-1 1000 m
Silver medal – second place	1964 Tokyo	K-1 1000 m

World Championships
Gold medal – first place	1966 East Berlin	K-1 10000 m
Gold medal – first place	1971 Belgrade	K-1 4 x 500 m
Silver medal – second place	1966 East Berlin	K-1 4 x 500 m
Bronze medal – third place	1963 Jajce	K-1 10000 m
Bronze medal – third place	1970 Copenhagen	K-1 4 x 500 m
Bronze medal – third place	1971 Belgrade	K-1 500 m

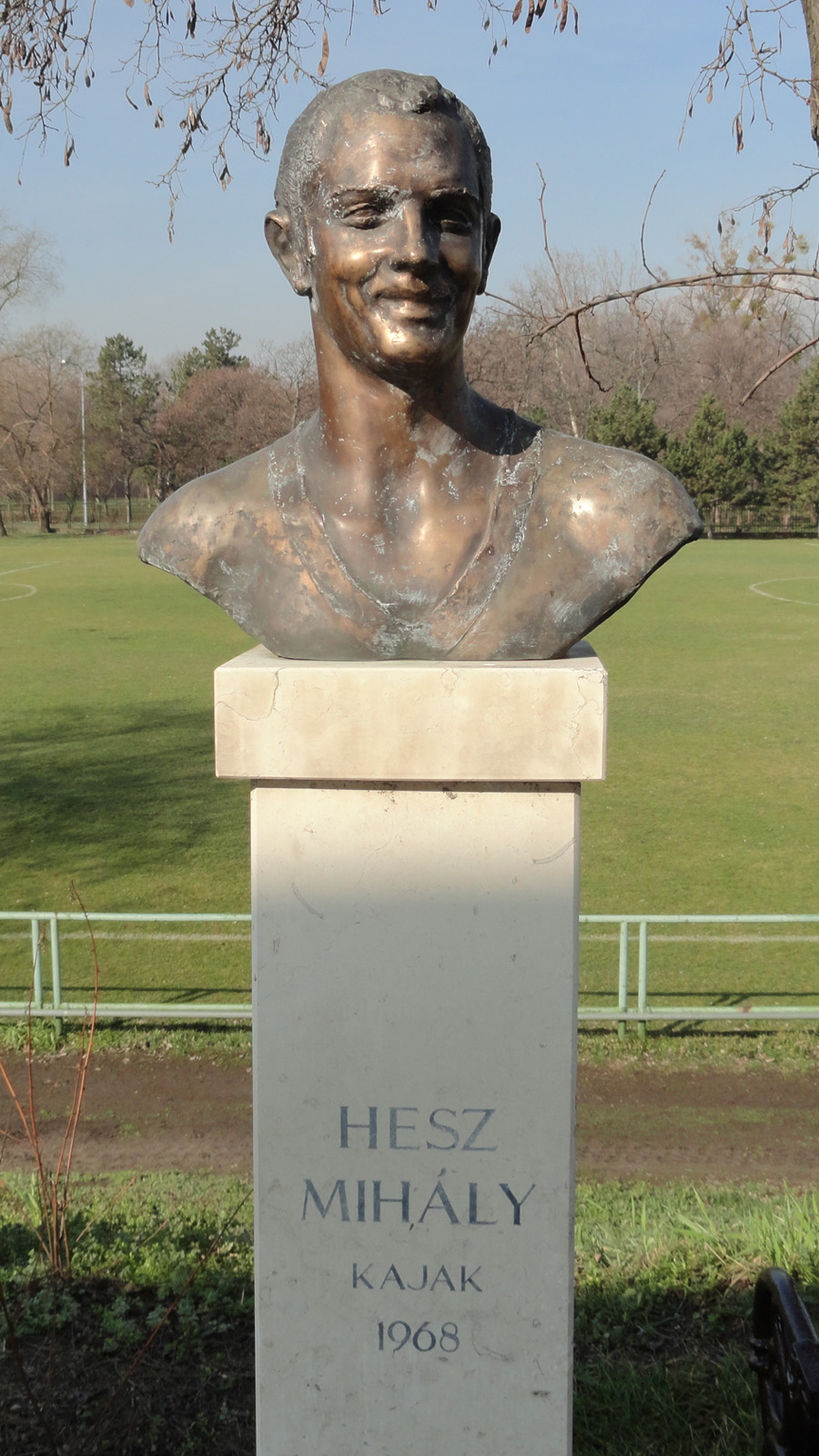
Hesz Mihály.jpg

Mihály Hesz (born 15 December 1943) is a Hungarian sprint canoeist who competed from the early 1960s to the early 1970s. Competing in two Summer Olympics, he won two medals in the K-1 1000 m event with a gold in 1968 and a silver in 1964.

Hesz also won six medals at the ICF Canoe Sprint World Championships with two golds (K-1 10000 m: 1966, K-1 4 x 500 m: 1971), a silver (K-1 4 x 500 m: 1966), and three bronzes (K-1 500 m: 1971, K-1 10000 m: 1963, K-1 4 x 500 m: 1970).

He married and later divorced Andrea Gyarmati, who won two medals in women's swimming at the 1972 Summer Olympics in Munich.
