= Lyudmila Pinayeva =

Russian canoe racer (born 1936)

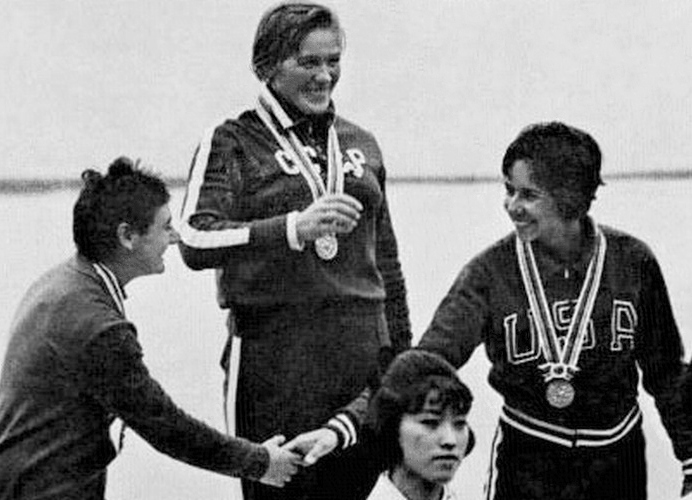
- Pinayeva (center) at the 1964 Olympics

Personal information
- Born: 14 January 1936 (age 90) Krasnoye Selo, Leningrad Oblast, Russian SFSR, Soviet Union
- Height: 164 cm (5 ft 5 in)
- Weight: 67 kg (148 lb)

Sport
- Sport: Canoe sprint
- Club: Trud Leningrad
Medal record
Representing the Soviet Union
Olympic Games
Gold medal – first place	1964 Tokyo	K-1 500 m
Gold medal – first place	1968 Mexico City	K-1 500 m
Bronze medal – third place	1968 Mexico City	K-2 500 m
Gold medal – first place	1972 Munich	K-2 500 m
World Championships
Gold medal – first place	1963 Jajce	K-4 500 m
Silver medal – second place	1963 Jajce	K-1 500 m
Silver medal – second place	1963 Jajce	K-2 500 m
Gold medal – first place	1966 East Berlin	K-1 500 m
Gold medal – first place	1966 East Berlin	K-4 500 m
Gold medal – first place	1970 Copenhagen	K-1 500 m
Gold medal – first place	1971 Belgrade	K-1 500 m
Gold medal – first place	1971 Belgrade	K-4 500 m
Gold medal – first place	1973 Tampere	K-4 500 m
Silver medal – second place	1973 Tampere	K-2 500 m

Lyudmila Iosifovna Pinayeva (Russian: Людмила Иосифовна Пинаева; née Khvedosyuk, Russian: Хведосюк; born 14 January 1936) is a retired Soviet sprint canoeist. She competed at the 1964, 1968 and 1972 Olympics and won four medals, with three golds and one bronze. She also won ten medals at the world championships with seven golds (K-1 500 m: 1966, 1970, 1971; K-4 500 m: 1963, 1966, 1971, 1973) and three silvers (K-1 500 m: 1963, K-2 500 m: 1963, 1973).
