= Roswitha Esser =

German canoeist

Medal record

Women's canoe sprint

Olympic Games
Gold medal – first place	1964 Tokyo	K-2 500 m
Gold medal – first place	1968 Mexico City	K-2 500 m

World Championships
Gold medal – first place	1963 Jajce	K-2 500 m
Gold medal – first place	1970 Copenhagen	K-2 500 m
Silver medal – second place	1963 Jacje	K-4 500 m
Silver medal – second place	1966 East Berlin	K-1 500 m
Silver medal – second place	1966 East Berlin	K-4 500 m
Silver medal – second place	1971 Belgrade	K-4 500 m
Bronze medal – third place	1970 Copenhagen	K-4 500 m

Roswitha Esser (German pronunciation: [ʁɔsˈviːtaː ˈɛsɐ]; born 18 January 1941 in Bad Godesberg) is a West German sprint canoeist who competed from the mid-1960s to the early 1970s.

Esser's interest in sports began at an early age, displaying an interest for canoeing. With years of training, she has excelled in her career, going on to participate in the summer olympics.

Notably, her achievements include:

1. ICF Canoe Sprint World Championships - Esser won seven medals at the ICF Canoe Sprint World Championships with two golds (K-2 500 m: 1963, 1970), four silvers (K-1 500 m: 1966, K-4 500 m: 1963, 1966, 1971), and a bronze (K-4 500 m: 1970).
2. Olympic games - Sprint canoeist Roswitha Esser won two gold medals in the K2 at the 1964 Tokyo and the 1968 Mexico City Olympic Games, alongside her teammate Annemarie Zimmermann. In 1964 Esser and Zimmermann were awarded the Silver Bay Leaf, the highest German sports award. Both were also elected 1964 Sportswomen of the Year. The pair represented the mixed German team in Tokyo and West Germany in 1968. In 1972 Esser came back with her new partner Renate Breuer and finished fifth at the Olympics. Esser also won a gold medal at the 1963 Worlds with Zimmermann, and in 1970 with Breuer. In 1966 she added a silver medal in the K1, winning three silvers in K4 in 1963, 1966, and 1971, also adding a K4 bronze in 1970. At the European Championships Esser won gold in 1963 and bronze in 1969 with Zimmermann in the K2, also claiming K4 medals with a silver in 1969 and a 1965 bronze.
1. Multiple National Championship Titles - Domestically Esser won West German titles in K2 with Zimmermann in 1962-64, and 1968-69, with non-Olympians Irene Rozema in 1965, Erika Rekitt in 1966, and Roswitha Spohr in 1972. Esser also won the K1 title in 1965-67

Outside of her sporting achievements, Esser maintains a private personal life, preferring to keep her activities off the public radar.
