= Canoeing at the 1960 Summer Olympics – Men's K-1 4 × 500 metres =

1960 Summer Olympic event

The men's K-1 4 × 500 metres event was a relay kayaking event conducted over 500 meters as part of the Canoeing at the 1960 Summer Olympics program on Lake Albano. This would be the only time this event was held in the Summer Olympics though it was part of the ICF Canoe Sprint World Championships from 1948 to 1975.

== Medalists ==
Gold	Silver	Bronze
United Team of Germany; Dieter Krause; Günther Perleberg; Paul Lange; Friedhelm Wentzke	Hungary; Imre Szöllősi; Imre Kemecsey; András Szente; György Mészáros	Denmark; Erik Hansen; Helmuth Sørensen; Arne Høyer; Erling Jessen

== Results ==
=== Heats ===
The 18 crews first raced in three heats on August 26. The top two finishers in each heats advanced directly to the semifinals. One was disqualified while remaining 11 teams were relegated to the repechage heats.

Heat 1
1.	Ruud Knuppe, Cees Lagrand, Toon Geurts, and Guillaume Weijzen (NED)	8:04.32	QS
2.	Ronald Rhodes, Raymond Blick, Robert Lowery, and Edward Cronk (GBR)	8:17.29	QS
3.	Walter Buchgraber, Hermann Salzner, Karl Leitner, and Herbert Wiedermann (AUT)	8:20.16	QR
4.	Hans Straub, Werner Weber, Robert Zika, and Roland Huber (SUI)	8:26.40	QR
5.	Russell Dermond, Charles Lundmark, Robert O'Brien, and John Pagkos (USA)	8:29.21	QR
-	Ladislav Čepčianský, Miroslav Pavelec, Vladimír Špaček, and František Vršovský (TCH)	DISQ
Heat 2
1.	Paul Lange, Günther Perleberg, Friedhelm Wentzke, and Dieter Krause (EUA)	7:54.38	QS
2.	Igor Pisaryev, Anatoly Kononenko, Fyodor Lyakhovsky, and Vladimir Natalukha (URS)	8:00.36	QS
3.	Helmuth Sørensen, Arne Høyer, Erling Jessen, and Erik Hansen (DEN)	8:03.55	QR
4.	Cesare Zilioli, Renato Ongari, Alberto Schiavi, and Annibale Berton (ITA)	8:10.76	QR
5.	Hendrik Verbrugghe, Germain Van Der Moere, Robert De Waele, and Yvan Decock (BEL)	8:44.33	QR
6.	Henri Amazouze, Jean Houde, Pierre Derivery, and Jean Friquet (FRA)	8:44.48	QR
Heat 3
1.	Imre Szöllősi, Imre Kemecsey, András Szente, and György Mészáros (HUN)	7:50.51	QS
2.	Carl von Gerber, Åke Nilsson, Gert Fredriksson, and Sven-Olov Sjödelius (SWE)	7:56.24	QS
3.	Mircea Anastasescu, Aurel Vernescu, Ion Sideri, and Stavru Teodorov (ROU)	7:59.81	QR
4.	Stefan Kapłaniak, Władysław Zieliński, Ryszard Skwarski, and Ryszard Marchlik (POL)	8:06.98	QR
5.	Dennis Green, Barry Stuart, Phil Coles, and Allan Livingstone (AUS)	8:17.52	QR
6.	Juhani Helenius, Paavo Vaskio, Torbjörn Blomqvist, and Rolf Björklund (FIN)	8:21.38	QR

Czechoslovakia was disqualified in the first heat in accordance to article 22 of the competition rules.

=== Repechages ===
Held on August 26, the top two finishers in each of the three repechages advanced to the semifinals.

Repechage 1
1.	Cesare Zilioli, Renato Ongari, Alberto Schiavi, and Annibale Berton (ITA)	8:06.48	QS
2.	Dennis Green, Barry Stuart, Phil Coles, and Allan Livingstone (AUS)	8:13.22	QS
3.	Walter Buchgraber, Hermann Salzner, Karl Leitner, and Herbert Wiedermann (AUT)	8:23.90
Repechage 2
1.	Helmuth Sørensen, Arne Høyer, Erling Jessen, and Erik Hansen (DEN)	7:58.40	QS
2.	Stefan Kapłaniak, Władysław Zieliński, Ryszard Skwarski, and Ryszard Marchlik (POL)	8:06.80	QS
3.	Russell Dermond, Charles Lundmark, Robert O'Brien, and John Pagkos (USA)	8:18.51
4.	Henri Amazouze, Jean Houde, Pierre Derivery, and Jean Friquet (FRA)	8:20.87
Repechage 3
1.	Mircea Anastasescu, Aurel Vernescu, Ion Sideri, and Stavru Teodorov (ROU)	7:58.61	QS
2.	Juhani Helenius, Paavo Vaskio, Torbjörn Blomqvist, and Rolf Björklund (FIN)	8:09.43	QS
3.	Hendrik Verbrugghe, Germain Van Der Moere, Robert De Waele, and Yvan Decock (BEL)	8:11.24
4.	Hans Straub, Werner Weber, Robert Zika, and Roland Huber (SUI)	8:36.57

=== Semifinals ===
The top two finishers in each of the three semifinals (raced on August 27) advanced to the final. All other teams were eliminated.

Semifinal 1
1.	Igor Pisaryev, Anatoly Kononenko, Fyodor Lyakhovsky, and Vladimir Natalukha (URS)	7:53.86	QF
2.	Stefan Kapłaniak, Władysław Zieliński, Ryszard Skwarski, and Ryszard Marchlik (POL)	7:57.54	QF
3.	Ruud Knuppe, Cees Lagrand, Toon Geurts, and Guillaume Weijzen (NED)	7:58.44
4.	Cesare Zilioli, Renato Ongari, Alberto Schiavi, and Annibale Berton (ITA)	7:59.21
Semifinal 2
1.	Paul Lange, Günther Perleberg, Friedhelm Wentzke, and Dieter Krause (EUA)	7:43.92	QF
2.	Helmuth Sørensen, Arne Høyer, Erling Jessen, and Erik Hansen (DEN)	7:52.29	QF
3.	Carl von Gerber, Åke Nilsson, Gert Fredriksson, and Sven-Olov Sjödelius (SWE)	7:55.05
4.	Juhani Helenius, Paavo Vaskio, Torbjörn Blomqvist, and Rolf Björklund (FIN)	8:21.25
Semifinal 3
1.	Imre Szöllősi, Imre Kemecsey, András Szente, and György Mészáros (HUN)	7:50.03	QF
2.	Mircea Anastasescu, Aurel Vernescu, Ion Sideri, and Stavru Teodorov (ROU)	7:58.21	QF
3.	Dennis Green, Barry Stuart, Phil Coles, and Allan Livingstone (AUS)	8:09.02
4.	Ronald Rhodes, Raymond Blick, Robert Lowery, and Edward Cronk (GBR)	8:11.52

Beudner replaced Knuppe for the Netherlands between the first heat and the first semifinal.

=== Final ===
The final was held on August 29.

Gold	Paul Lange, Günther Perleberg, Friedhelm Wentzke, and Dieter Krause (EUA)	7:39.43
Silver	Imre Szöllősi, Imre Kemecsey, András Szente, and György Mészáros (HUN)	7:44.02
Bronze	Helmuth Sørensen, Arne Høyer, Erling Jessen, and Erik Hansen (DEN)	7:46.09
4.	Stefan Kapłaniak, Władysław Zieliński, Ryszard Skwarski, and Ryszard Marchlik (POL)	7:49.93
5.	Igor Pisaryev, Anatoly Kononenko, Fyodor Lyakhovsky, and Vladimir Natalukha (URS)	7:50.72
6.	Mircea Anastasescu, Aurel Vernescu, Ion Sideri, and Stavru Teodorov (ROU)	7:53.00
