= Canoeing at the 1960 Summer Olympics =

Canoeing at the Games of the XVII Olympiad
- No. of events: 7

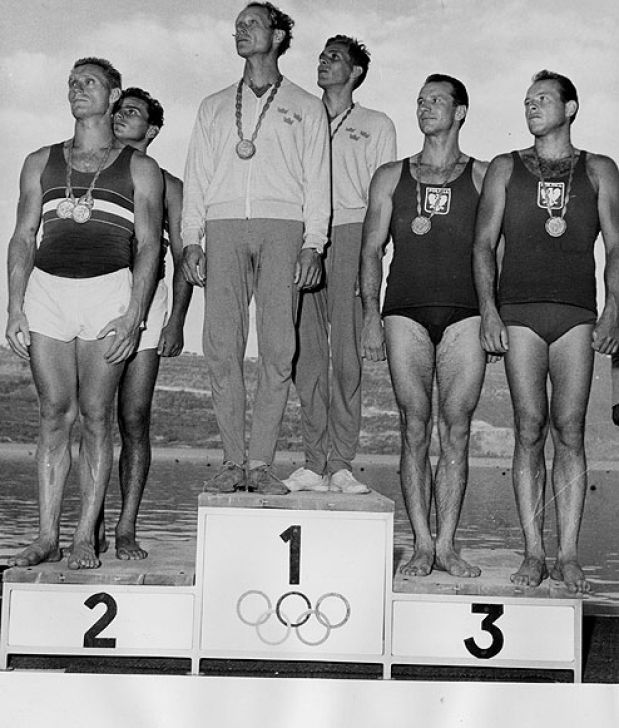
Men's K-2 1000 metres medalist at the 1960 Summer Olympics. 1st: Sweden with Gert Fredriksson and Sven-Olov Sjödelius. 2nd: Hungary with András Szente and György Mészáros. 3rd: Poland with Stefan Kapłaniak and Władysław Zieliński.

At the 1960 Summer Olympics in Rome, seven events in sprint canoe racing were contested at Lake Albano. Four changes were done to the program. First, the 10000 metre events that were raced from 1936 to 1956 were permanently dropped from the Olympic program, leaving all races at the 500 metre and 1000 metre distances. Second, the women's K-2 500 m event was added to the program, as was a men's K-1 4 × 500 m relay event (though for these games). Third, event timing in 1/100ths of a second at these games. Fourth, a repechage system was introduced that was used to the 1996 games in Atlanta at Lake Lanier.

== Medal table ==
Rank	Nation	Gold	Silver	Bronze	Total
1	Soviet Union	3	1	0	4
2	Hungary	1	3	2	6
3	United Team of Germany	1	2	0	3
4	Denmark	1	0	1	2
4	Sweden	1	0	1	2
6	Italy	0	1	0	1
7	Poland	0	0	2	2
8	Romania	0	0	1	1
Totals (8 entries)		7	7	7	21

== Medal summary ==
=== Men's events ===
Games	Gold	Silver	Bronze
C-1 1000 m	János Parti; Hungary	Aleksandr Silayev; Soviet Union	Leon Rotman; Romania
C-2 1000 m	Leonid Geishtor and Sergei Makarenko (URS)	Aldo Dezi and Francesco La Macchia (ITA)	Imre Farkas and András Törő (HUN)
K-1 1000 m	Erik Hansen; Denmark	Imre Szöllősi; Hungary	Gert Fredriksson; Sweden
K-1 4 × 500 m relay	United Team of Germany; Dieter Krause; Günther Perleberg; Paul Lange; Friedhelm Wentzke	Hungary; Imre Szöllősi; Imre Kemeczei; András Szente; György Mészáros	Denmark; Erik Hansen; Helmuth Nyborg; Arne Høyer; Erling Jessen
K-2 1000 m	Gert Fredriksson and Sven-Olov Sjödelius (SWE)	György Mészáros and András Szente (HUN)	Stefan Kapłaniak and Władysław Zieliński (POL)

=== Women's events ===
Games	Gold	Silver	Bronze
K-1 500 metres	Antonina Seredina; Soviet Union	Therese Zenz; United Team of Germany	Daniela Walkowiak; Poland
K-2 500 metres	Mariya Shubina and Antonina Seredina (URS)	Therese Zenz and Ingrid Hartmann (EUA)	Klára Fried-Bánfalvi and Vilma Egresi (HUN)

== Participating nations ==
- Australia (7)
- Austria (10)
- Belgium (4)
- Bulgaria (5)
- Canada (6)
- Czechoslovakia (10)
- Denmark (9)
- Finland (9)
- France (8)
- United Team of Germany (10)
- Great Britain (7)
- Hungary (9)
- Italy (12)
- Luxembourg (3)
- Netherlands (5)
- Norway (2)
- Poland (6)
- Romania (12)
- Soviet Union (12)
- Spain (2)
- Sweden (6)
- Switzerland (4)
- United States (13)
- Yugoslavia (3)
