= Canoeing at the 1960 Summer Olympics – Men's K-2 1000 metres =

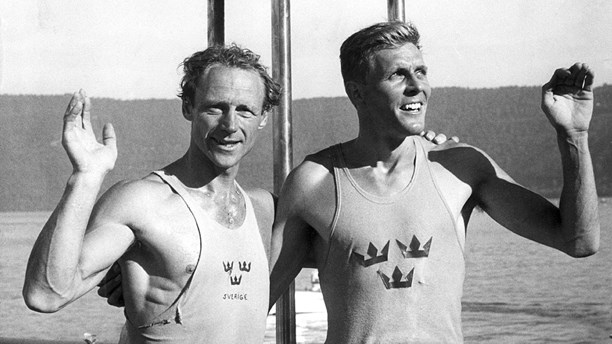
Gert Fredriksson and Sven-Olov Sjödelius at the 1960 Olympics

The men's K-2 1000 metres event was a pairs kayaking event conducted as part of the Canoeing at the 1960 Summer Olympics program on Lake Albano.

== Medalists ==
Gold	Silver	Bronze
Gert Fredriksson and Sven-Olov Sjödelius (SWE)	György Mészáros and András Szente (HUN)	Stefan Kapłaniak and Władysław Zieliński (POL)

== Results ==
=== Heats ===
The 23 crews first raced in three heats on August 26. The top three finishers from each heat advanced directly to the semifinals while the remaining 14 teams were relegated to the repechage heats.

Heat 1
1.	Ruud Knuppe and Antonius Geurts (NED)	3:43.98	QS
2.	František Riha and František Vršovský (TCH)	3:45.49	QS
3.	Lorenzo Cantarello and Antonio Rucco (ITA)	3:45.80	QS
4.	Hendrik Verbrugghe and Germain van der Moere (BEL)	3:46.42	QR
5.	Dennis Green and Barry Stuart (AUS)	3:46.71	QR
6.	Vasilie Nicoarǎ and Mercurie Ivanov (ROU)	3:49.00	QR
7.	John Harris and Basil Pratt (GBR)	3:58.25	QR
Heat 2
1.	Dieter Krause and Wolfgang Lange (EUA)	3:37.87	QS
2.	György Mészáros and András Szente (HUN)	3:38.28	QS
3.	Stefan Kapłaniak and Władysław Zieliński (POL)	3:39.41	QS
4.	Nikolas Rudzinskas and Ivan Holovachev (URS)	3:39.98	QR
5.	Staniša Radmanović and Radovan Božin (YUG)	3:47.85	QR
6.	Kenneth Wilson and John Wolters (USA)	3:49.96	QR
7.	Alan McCleery and Lou Lukanovich (CAN)	-	QR
8.	Arne Ervig and Rolf Olsen (NOR)	3:52.93	QR
Heat 3
1.	Kaj Schmidt and Vagn Schmidt (DEN)	3:45.04	QS
2.	Juan Feliz and Joaquín Larroya (ESP)	3:46.36	QS
3.	Gert Fredriksson and Sven-Olov Sjödelius (SWE)	3:46.50	QS
4.	Rolf Åkerfelt and Rainer Åkerfelt (FIN)	3:48.36	QR
5.	Helmut Holzschuster and Franz Wolf (AUT)	3:49.37	QR
6.	Ivan Simeonov and Lyubomir Oresharov (BUL)	3:49.88	QR
7.	Marcel Lentz and Léon Klares (LUX)	3:54.73	QR
8.	Hans Straub and Robert Zika (SUI)	3:56.17	QR

Canada's time in heat two not shown in the official report while Luxembourg and Switzerland are switched in the official report in heat three though the athletes for both countries were in the correct finishing position in the report.

=== Repechages ===
The top three finishers in each of the three repechages, which took place on August 27, advanced to the semifinals.

Repechage 1
1.	Hendrik Verbrugghe and Germain van der Moere (BEL)	3:49.34	QS
2.	Staniša Radmanović and Radovan Božin (YUG)	3:49.95	QS
3.	Arne Ervig and Rolf Olsen (NOR)	-	QS
4.	Ivan Simeonov and Lyubomir Oresharov (BUL)	3:53.27
5.	John Harris and Basil Pratt (GBR)	3:59.33
Repechage 2
1.	Nikolas Rudzinskas and Ivan Holovachev (URS)	3:45.33	QS
2.	Vasilie Nicoarǎ and Mercurie Ivanov (ROU)	3:50.84	QS
3.	Helmut Holzschuster and Franz Wolf (AUT)	3:53.48	QS
4.	Alan McCleery and Lou Lukanovich (CAN)	3:58.34
5.	Marcel Lentz and Léon Klares (LUX)	4:01.10
Repechage 3
1.	Dennis Green and Barry Stuart (AUS)	3:51.24	QS
2.	Kenneth Wilson and John Wolters (USA)	3:52.15	QS
3.	Rolf Åkerfelt and Rainer Åkerfelt (FIN)	3:52.28	QS
4.	Hans Straub and Robert Zika (SUI)	3:55.58

Norway's time in the first repechage was not listed in the official report.

=== Semifinals ===
The top three finishers in each of the three semifinals (raced on August 28) advanced to the final while the remaining teams were eliminated.

Semifinal 1
1.	György Mészáros and András Szente (HUN)	3:46.75	QF
2.	Gert Fredriksson and Sven-Olov Sjödelius (SWE)	3:47.64	QF
3.	Ruud Knuppe and Antonius Geurts (NED)	3:48.58	QF
4.	Hendrik Verbrugghe and Germain van der Moere (BEL)	3:48.71
5.	Vasilie Nicoarǎ and Mercurie Ivanov (ROU)	3:53.80
6.	Rolf Åkerfelt and Rainer Åkerfelt (FIN)	3:54.44
Semifinal 2
1.	Nikolas Rudzinskas and Ivan Holovachev (URS)	3:46.87	QF
2.	Dieter Krause and Wolfgang Lange (EUA)	3:49.52	QF
3.	Lorenzo Cantarello and Antonio Rucco (ITA)	3:52.51	QF
4.	Arne Ervig and Rolf Olsen (NOR)	3:53.98
5.	Juan Feliz and Joaquín Larroya (ESP)	3:54.14
6.	Kenneth Wilson and John Wolters (USA)	4:01.06
Semifinal 3
1.	Stefan Kapłaniak and Władysław Zieliński (POL)	3:48.62	QF
2.	František Riha and František Vršovský (TCH)	3:50.40	QF
3.	Kaj Schmidt and Vagn Schmidt (DEN)	3:51.65	QF
4.	Staniša Radmanović and Radovan Božin (YUG)	3:52.20
5.	Helmut Holzschuster and Franz Wolf (AUT)	3:54.46
6.	Dennis Green and Barry Stuart (AUS)	3:55.22

=== Final ===
The final was held on August 29, 1960.

Gold	Gert Fredriksson and Sven-Olov Sjödelius (SWE)	3:34.73
Silver	György Mészáros and András Szente (HUN)	3:34.91
Bronze	Stefan Kapłaniak and Władysław Zieliński (POL)	3:37.34
4.	Nikolas Rudzinskas and Ivan Holovachev (URS)	3:37.48
5.	Kaj Schmidt and Vagn Schmidt (DEN)	3:39.06
6.	František Riha and František Vršovský (TCH)	3:40.78
7.	Ruud Knuppe and Antonius Geurts (NED)	3:41.01
8.	Dieter Krause and Wolfgang Lange (EUA)	3:44.26
9.	Lorenzo Cantarello and Antonio Rucco (ITA)	3:44.26
