= Canoeing at the 1956 Summer Olympics – Men's K-2 1000 metres =

The men's K-2 1000 metres was a competition in canoeing at the 1956 Summer Olympics. The K-2 event is raced by two-man canoe sprint kayaks. Heats and final took place on December 1.

== Medalists ==
Gold	Silver	Bronze
Meinrad Miltenberger and Michel Scheuer (EUA)	Anatoly Demitkov and Mikhail Kaaleste (URS)	Maximilian Raub and Herbert Wiedermann (AUT)

== Heats ==
The 15 teams first raced in three heats. The top three teams in each heat advanced directly to the final.

Heat 1
1.	Mikhail Kaaleste and Anatoly Demitkov (URS)	3:55.1	QF
2.	Max Raub and Herbert Wiedermann (AUT)	3:57.2	QF
3.	Miroslav Jemelka and Rudolf Klabouch (TCH)	3:58.3	QF
4.	Carl-Åke Ljung and Ragnar Heurlin (SWE)	4:00.0
5.	Imre Vágyóczky and Zoltán Szigeti (HUN)	4:00.3
Heat 2
1.	Michel Scheuer and Meinrad Miltenberger (EUA)	3:56.4	QF
2.	Mircea Anastasescu and Stavru Teodorov (ROU)	3:59.1	QF
3.	Brian Bullivant and Raymond Blick (GBR)	4:01.6	QF
4.	Ryszard Skwarski and Jerzy Górski (POL)	4:12.6
5.	Russell Dermond and John Pagkos (USA)	4:22.7
Heat 3
1.	Walter Brown and Dennis Green (AUS)	4:03.0	QF
2.	Henri Verbrugghe and Germain van der Moere (BEL)	4:04.7	QF
3.	Maurice Graffen and Michel Meyer (FRA)	4:09.7	QF
4.	Robert Smith and Leslie Melia (CAN)	4:27.8
-	Pentti Raaskoski and Juhani Helenius (FIN)	DQ

The Finnish team originally finished second in their heat prior to their disqualification.

== Final ==
Gold	Michel Scheuer and Meinrad Miltenberger (EUA)	3:49.6
Silver	Mikhail Kaaleste and Anatoly Demitkov (URS)	3:51.4
Bronze	Max Raub and Herbert Wiedermann (AUT)	3:55.8
4.	Mircea Anastasescu and Stavru Teodorov (ROU)	3:56.1
5.	Maurice Graffen and Michel Meyer (FRA)	3:58.3
6.	Henri Verbrugghe and Germain van der Moere (BEL)	3:58.7
7.	Walter Brown and Dennis Green (AUS)	3:59.1
8.	Miroslav Jemelka and Rudolf Klabouch (TCH)	4:01.4
9.	Brian Bullivant and Raymond Blick (GBR)	4:05.9
