= Canoeing at the 1960 Summer Olympics – Men's K-1 1000 metres =

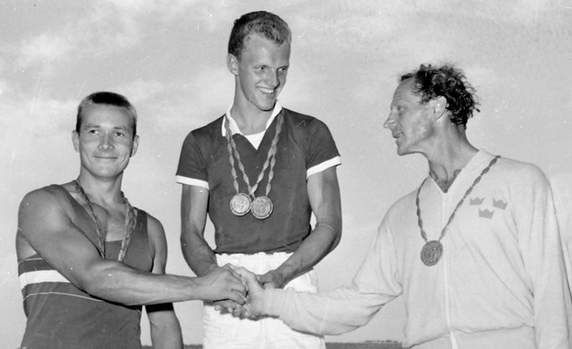
Left-right: Imre Szöllősi, Erik Hansen, Gert Fredriksson

The men's K-1 1000 metres event was an individual kayaking event conducted as part of the Canoeing at the 1960 Summer Olympics.

== Medalists ==
Gold	Silver	Bronze
Erik Hansen (DEN)	Imre Szöllősi (HUN)	Gert Fredriksson (SWE)

== Results ==
=== Heats ===
24 competitors first raced in three heats on August 26. The top three finishers from each of the heats advanced directly to the semifinals; two were eliminated due to not starting, and the remaining 13 competitors were relegated to the repechage heats.

Heat 1
1.	Erik Hansen (DEN)	3:57.04	QS
2.	Ronald Rhodes (GBR)	4:01.68	QS
3.	Wolfgang Lange (EUA)	4:05.08	QS
4.	Rolf Olsen (NOR)	4:08.38	QR
5.	Robert De Waele (BEL)	4:08.60	QR
6.	Roland Huber (SUI)	4:26.26	QR
7.	Michel Meyer (FRA)	4:40.72	QR
-	Lyubomir Oresharov (BUL)	Did not start
Heat 2
1.	Imre Szöllősi (HUN)	4:04.23	QS
2.	Phil Coles (AUS)	4:06.27	QS
3.	Cesare Zilioli (ITA)	4:06.58	QS
4.	Aleksandar Kerčov (YUG)	4:07.08	QR
5.	Simo Kuismanen (FIN)	4:09.78	QR
6.	Joaquín Larroya (ESP)	4:12.93	QR
7.	Paul Beachem (USA)	4:18.64	QR
-	Igor Lipalit (ROU)	Did not start
Heat 3
1.	Ibragim Khasanov (URS)	4:06.14	QS
2.	Guillaume Weijzen (NED)	4:06.77	QS
3.	Gert Fredriksson (SWE)	4:07.35	QS
4.	Ladislav Čepčianský (TCH)	4:07.83	QR
5.	Ryszard Skwarski (POL)	4:12.70	QR
6.	Herbert Wiedermann (AUT)	4:15.71	QR
7.	Michael Brown (CAN)	4:27.28	QR
8.	André Conrady (LUX)	4:27.38	QR

=== Repechages ===
The repechages took place on August 26. The top three finishers in each repechage advanced to the semifinals.

Repechage 1
1.	Simo Kuismanen (FIN)	4:11.50	QS
2.	Herbert Wiedermann (AUT)	4:13.73	QS
3.	Rolf Olsen (NOR)	4:13.87	QS
4.	Michel Meyer (FRA)	4:24.93
Repechage 2
1.	Ryszard Skwarski (POL)	4:06.99	QS
2.	Aleksandar Kerčov (YUG)	4:07.33	QS
3.	Paul Beachem (USA)	4:18.17	QS
4.	Roland Huber (SUI)	4:24.16
5.	André Conrady (LUX)	4:28.40
Repechage 3
1.	Ladislav Čepčianský (TCH)	4:11.39	QS
2.	Joaquín Larroya (ESP)	4:13.82	QS
3.	Robert De Waele (BEL)	4:16.61	QS
4.	Michael Brown (CAN)	4:55.73

=== Semifinals ===
The top three finishers in each of the three semifinals (raced on August 27) advanced to the final with the rest of the competitors eliminated.

Semifinal 1
1.	Erik Hansen (DEN)	3:57.51	QF
2.	Gert Fredriksson (SWE)	4:03.32	QF
3.	Simo Kuismanen (FIN)	4:03.42	QF
4.	Phil Coles (AUS)	4:08.05
5.	Aleksandar Kerčov (YUG)	4:10.27
6.	Robert De Waele (BEL)	4:12.48
Semifinal 2
1.	Imre Szöllősi (HUN)	3:57.11	QF
2.	Wolfgang Lange (EUA)	4:02.88	QF
3.	Rolf Olsen (NOR)	4:04.82	QF
4.	Guillaume Weijzen (NED)	4:07.30
5.	Ryszard Skwarski (POL)	4:09.26
6.	Joaquín Larroya (ESP)	4:20.39
Semifinal 3
1.	Ronald Rhodes (GBR)	4:05.20	QF
2.	Ibragim Khasanov (URS)	4:05.20	QF
3.	Cesare Zilioli (ITA)	4:06.36	QF
4.	Ladislav Čepčianský (TCH)	4:07.75
5.	Paul Beachem (USA)	4:15.10
6.	Herbert Wiedermann (AUT)	4:17.45

=== Final ===
The final was held on August 29.

Gold	Erik Hansen (DEN)	3:53.00
Silver	Imre Szöllősi (HUN)	3:54.02
Bronze	Gert Fredriksson (SWE)	3:55.89
4.	Ibragim Khasanov (URS)	3:56.38
5.	Ronald Rhodes (GBR)	4:01.15
6.	Rolf Olsen (NOR)	4:02.31
7.	Wolfgang Lange (EUA)	4:03.05
8.	Simo Kuismanen (FIN)	4:03.66
9.	Cesare Zilioli (ITA)	4:04.90
