= Anatoly Demitkov =

Soviet canoeist

Medal record

Men's canoe sprint

Olympic Games
Silver medal – second place	1956 Melbourne	K-2 1000 m

World Championships
Bronze medal – third place	1958 Prague	K-2 1000 m
Bronze medal – third place	1958 Prague	K-4 1000 m

Anatoly Nikolayevich Demitkov (27 May 1926 – 15 August 2005) was a Soviet canoeist. He took the silver medal in the K-2 1000 m event at the 1956 Summer Olympics in Melbourne together with Mikhail Kaaleste. They went on to win the European Championship in 1957 and took third place at the 1958 Flatwater Racing World Championship in Prague.

== Biography ==
Anatoly Nikolayevich Demitkov was born on 27 May 1926 and fought in the Red Army during World War II. He began his sports career with DSO Spartak.

Anatoly Demitkov and his doubles partner Mikhail Kaaleste competed in the K-2 1000 m event at the 1956 Summer Olympics in Melbourne, Australia after finishing first in their qualifying heat in 3:55.1. They subsequently took the silver medal for their second-place finish in 3:51.4, coming behind West German Michael Scheuer and Meinrad Miltenberger, who finished 1.7 seconds faster in 3:49.6. They went on to win a gold medal at the 1957 European Championship.

Kaaleste and Demitkov finished third at the K-2 1000 m event at the 1958 ICF Canoe Sprint World Championships (Flatwater Racing World Championship) in Prague in 1958 and also took a second bronze for their K-4 1000 m finish at the same championship.

He worked as a trainer for DSO Spartak in 1963-1986.

Anatoly Demitkov died on 15 August 2005.

== Honours and awards ==
- Order of the Patriotic War, 2nd class
- Order of the Badge of Honour
- Medal "For the Defence of the Soviet Transarctic"
- Medal "For the Victory over Germany in the Great Patriotic War 1941–1945"
