= Canoeing at the 1956 Summer Olympics – Men's K-2 10000 metres =

The men's K-2 10000 metres was a competition in canoeing at the 1956 Summer Olympics. The K-2 event is raced by two-man canoe sprint kayaks. This would the last time this event was held in the Summer Olympics, though it would be held at the ICF Canoe Sprint World Championships from 1938 to 1993.

== Medalists ==
Gold	Silver	Bronze
János Urányi and László Fábián (HUN)	Fritz Briel and Theodor Kleine (EUA)	Dennis Green and Walter Brown (AUS)

== Final ==
The final took place November 30.

Gold	János Urányi and László Fábián (HUN)	43:37.0
Silver	Fritz Briel and Theodor Kleine (EUA)	43:40.6
Bronze	Dennis Green and Walter Brown (AUS)	43:43.2
4.	Hans Wetterström and Carl Sundin (SWE)	44:06.7
5.	Yevgeny Yatsinenko and Sergey Klimov (URS)	45:49.3
6.	Miroslav Jemelka and Rudolf Klabouch (TCH)	46:13.1
7.	Yrjö Hietanen and Simo Kuismanen (FIN)	46:40.4
8.	Brian Bullivant and Raymond Blick (GBR)	47:03.7
9.	Maurice Graffen and Michel Meyer (FRA)	47:12.8
10.	Jerzy Górski and Stefan Kapłaniak (POL)	47:21.5
11.	Alfred Schmidtberger and Hermann Salzner (AUT)	49:03.7
12.	Edward Houston and Kenneth Wilson (USA)	51:25.8
