= Åkerfelt =

Åkerfelt is a surname. Notable people with the surname include:

- Harry Åkerfelt (1915–2008), Finnish sprint canoeist
- Rainer Åkerfelt (1934–2016), Finnish sprint canoeist
- Rolf Åkerfelt (born 1941), Finnish sprint canoeist

== See also ==
- Mikael Åkerfeldt (born 1974), Swedish musician
