= Åke Nilsson =

Åke Nilsson may refer to:

- Åke Nilsson (canoeist) (1937–2005), Swedish sprint canoeist
- Åke Nilsson (athlete) (born 1945), Swedish javelin thrower
- Åke Nilsson (golfer), Swedish golfer
- Kjell-Åke Nilsson (born 1942), Swedish high jumper
- Kjell-Åke Nilsson (footballer), Swedish association football forward
- Sven-Åke Nilsson (born 1951), Swedish road racing cyclist
