= Kaaleste =

Family name

Kaaleste is a surname. Notable people with the surname include:

- Anna Kaaleste (1930–2014), Soviet cross-country skier
- Mikhail Kaaleste (1931–2018), Estonian sprint canoeist
