= Arne Høyer =

Danish canoeist

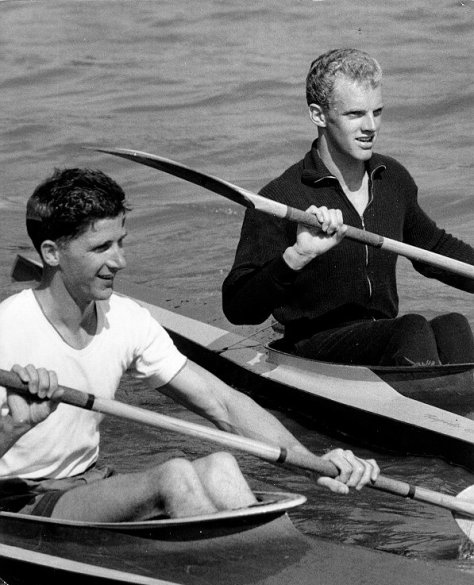
- Arne Høyer (left) and Erik Hansen in 1960

Personal information
- Born: 9 November 1928 Struer, Denmark
- Died: 2 April 2010 (aged 81) Struer, Denmark
- Height: 181 cm (5 ft 11 in)
- Weight: 70 kg (154 lb)

Sport
- Sport: Canoe racing
- Club: Struer Kajakklub
Medal record
Representing Denmark
Olympic Games
Bronze medal – third place	1960 Rome	K-1 4 × 500 m

Arne Høyer (9 November 1928 – 2 April 2010) was a Danish canoe sprinter who won a bronze medal in the K-1 4×500 m relay at the 1960 Summer Olympics, together with Erik Hansen, Helmuth Sørensen and Erling Jessen.
