= Cantarello =

Cantarello is an Italian surname. Notable people with the surname include:

- Lorenzo Cantarello (1932–2013), Italian sprint canoeist
- Vasco Cantarello (1936–2024), Italian rower
