= András Szente =

Hungarian canoeist

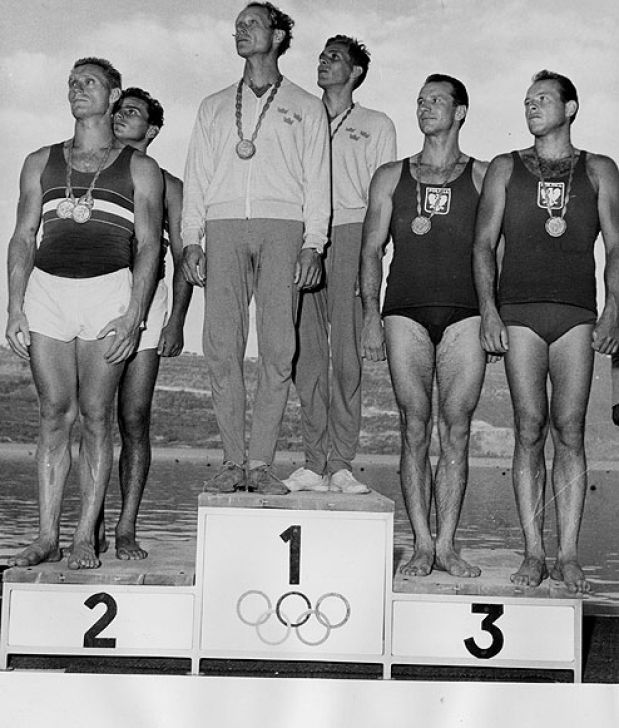
- Men's K-2 1000 m medalist ceremony at the 1960 Summer Olympics. 1st: Sweden with Gert Fredriksson and Sven-Olov Sjödelius. 2nd: Hungary with András Szente and György Mészáros. 3rd: Poland with Stefan Kapłaniak and Władysław Zieliński.

Personal information
- Born: December 10, 1939 Budapest, Hungary
- Died: September 14, 2012 (aged 72) Florida, United States
Medal record
Men's canoe sprint
Representing Hungary
Olympic Games
Silver medal – second place	1960 Rome	K-1 4 × 500 m
Silver medal – second place	1960 Rome	K-2 1000 m
World Championships
Silver medal – second place	1958 Prague	K-4 1000 m
Silver medal – second place	1966 East Berlin	K-1 4 × 500 m

András Szente (December 10, 1939 – September 14, 2012) was a Hungarian sprint canoeist who competed from the late 1950s to the late 1960s. Competing in two Summer Olympics, he won two silver medals at Rome in 1960, earning them in the K-1 4 × 500 m and the K-2 1000 m events.

Szente also won two silver medals at the ICF Canoe Sprint World Championships (K-1 4 × 500 m: 1966, K-4 1000 m: 1958).

== Biography ==
Szente András V was born on December 10, 1939, in Budapest, Hungary to Szente Erzsebet (Schmidt) and Szente András IV. András was one of four children with an older sister named Katalin and younger twin brothers named István and József. His father owned his own hair salon and was a well-known hairstylist in Budapest with a client list that included some of the most famous opera and movie stars of the time.

In his early teens András took up the sport of kayaking, which is a national pastime for the Hungarian people. He quickly rose through the competitive ranks becoming first a national champion, then a European champion, world champion, and finally a two-time Olympian winning two silver medals in the 1960 Rome Olympics and placing fourth in the 1964 Tokyo Olympics. András saw his sports career as a ticket to travel the world, traveling all throughout Europe with his teammates and visiting distant countries that the average Hungarian only dreamed of because travel was strictly limited during communist rule. In 1956, when András was only in his late teens and in high school, he participated in the uprising when the Hungarian people revolted against their communist dictators. Many years later, after he had defected to California, András would commemorate the anniversary of the ’56 uprising and would reflect back that many of his classmates that went out to protest that day never came home because they lost their lives. In 1969 András defected communist Hungary, traveling to Germany where he worked with American aid workers until he was given permission to come to the United States.

Upon arriving in America, András quickly integrated into the large Hungarian-American community in Los Angeles, California, joining a youth dance group where he would meet his future wife, Ágnes Zerinvári. András pursued Ágnes for two years until they fell in love and were married on August 26, 1972. The two were adventurous from the outset, traveling across the United States with their Dalmatian and camper in tow, and later traveled extensively throughout the world. On February 23, 1981, Ágnes and András gave birth to twin boys, and would raise their young family in California.

András died on September 14, 2012, at the age of 72 while vacationing with Ágnes in Florida.
