= Decock =

Decock is a surname. Notable people with the surname include:

- Pierre Decock (born 1959), Luxembourgish historian, writer, illustrator, and financial advisor
- Roger Decock (1927–2020), Belgian cyclist
- Yvan Decock (born 1941), Belgian sprint canoeist

== See also ==
- Decocker
