= György Mészáros =

Hungarian canoeist

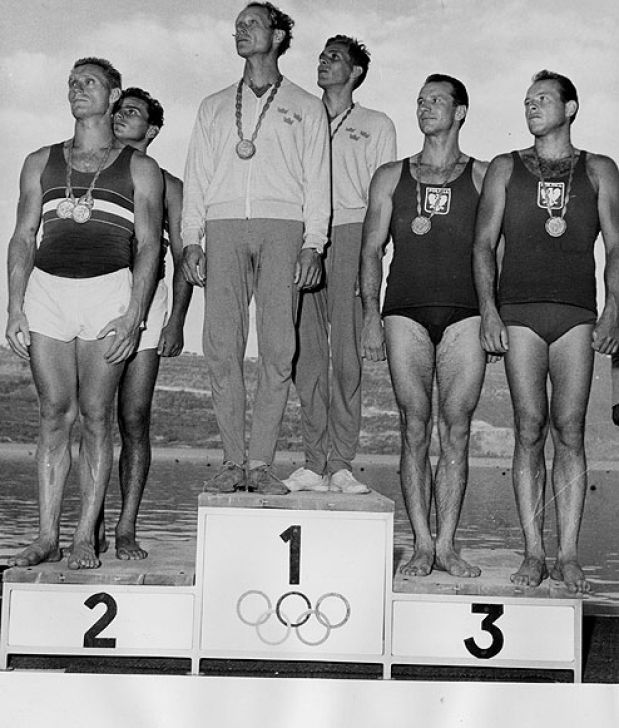
- Men's K-2 1000 metres medalist at the 1960 Summer Olympics. 1st: Sweden with Gert Fredriksson and Sven-Olov Sjödelius. 2nd: Hungary with András Szente and György Mészáros. 3rd: Poland with Stefan Kapłaniak and Władysław Zieliński.

Personal information
- Nationality: Hungarian
- Born: 30 April 1933 Budapest, Hungary
- Died: 14 September 2015 (aged 82)
Medal record
Men's canoe sprint
Representing Hungary
Olympic Games
Silver medal – second place	1960 Rome	K-1 4 × 500 m
Silver medal – second place	1960 Rome	K-2 1000 m
World Championships
Gold medal – first place	1954 Mâcon	K-2 1000 m
Silver medal – second place	1958 Prague	K-1 4 × 500 m
Silver medal – second place	1958 Prague	K-4 1000 m
Silver medal – second place	1971 Belgrade	K-4 10000 m
Bronze medal – third place	1954 Mâcon	K-4 10000 m

György Mészáros (30 April 1933 – 14 September 2015) was a Hungarian sprint canoeist who competed from the mid-1950s to the early 1970s. Competing in two Summer Olympics, he won two silver medals at Rome in 1960, earning them in the K-1 4 × 500 m and the K-2 1000 m events.

Mészáros also won five medals at the ICF Canoe Sprint World Championships with a gold (K-2 1000 m: 1954), three silvers (K-1 4 × 500 m: 1958, K-4 1000 m: 1958, K-4 10000 m: 1971), and a bronze (K-4 10000 m: 1954).

== Sources ==
- Wallechinsky, David and Jaime Loucky (2008). "Canoeing: Women's Kayak Fours 500 Meters". In The Complete Book of the Olympics: 2008 Edition. London: Aurum Press. p. 495.
