= Dermond =

Dermond is a surname. Notable people with the surname include:

- Percy Dermond (1919–2012), Australian rugby league footballer
- Russell C. Dermond (1936–2015), American canoeist
- Russell J. Dermond (1925–2014), American murder victim; husband of Shirley W. Dermond
- Shirley W. Dermond (1926–2014), American murder victim; wife of Russell J. Dermond

== See also ==
- McDermond
