= John Wolters =

John Wolters may refer to:

- John Wolters (musician), drummer with Dr. Hook & the Medicine Show
- John Wolters (canoeist) (born 1940), American sprint canoeist
