= Lyakhovsky =

Lyakhovsky is a Russian masculine surname with a feminine counterpart being Lyakhovskaya. It is also a Russian possessive word originating from the related surname Lyakhov. It may refer to.

- Fyodor Lyakhovsky (born 1936), Soviet sprint canoer
- Irina Lyakhovskaya (1941–2003), Russian swimmer
- Lyakhovsky Islands in Russia, named after Ivan Lyakhov:
  - Bolshoy Lyakhovsky Island
  - Maly Lyakhovsky Island

== See also ==
- Lakhovsky, a surname
