= Pavelec =

Pavelec (feminine Pavelcová) is a Czech surname. Notable people with the surname include:

- Marek Pavelec (born 1989), Czech violinist
- Miroslav Pavelec (1927–2019), Czech canoer
- Ondřej Pavelec (born 1987), Czech ice hockey player
- Ted Pavelec (1918–2005), American football player
