= Kaj Schmidt =

Danish sprint canoer

Kaj Schmidt (20 April 1926 – 21 April 2004) was a Danish sprint canoer who competed in the early 1960s. He finished fifth in the K-2 1000 m event at the 1960 Summer Olympics in Rome. In the K-2 he competed together with his brother Vagn Schmidt.
