= Władysław Zieliński =

Polish canoeist (1935–2025)

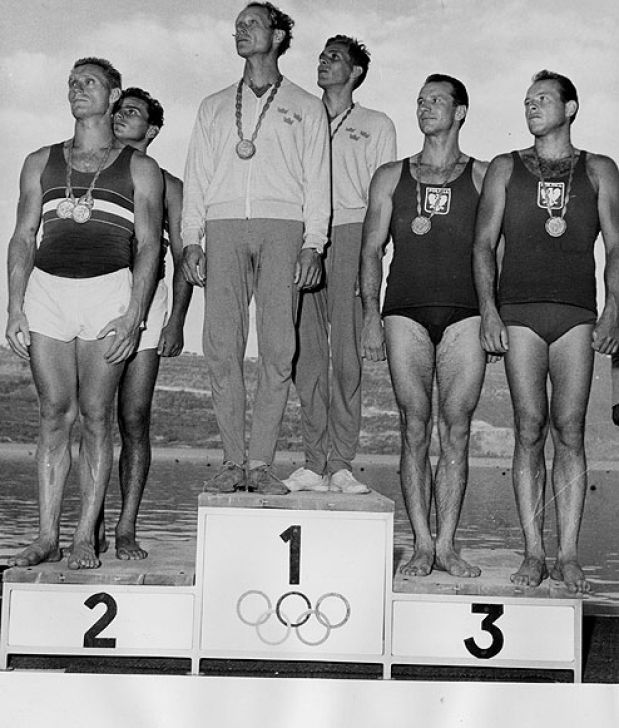
- Men's K-2 1000 metres medalist at the 1960 Summer Olympics. 1st: Sweden with Gert Fredriksson and Sven-Olov Sjödelius. 2nd: Hungary with András Szente and György Mészáros. 3rd: Poland with Stefan Kapłaniak and Władysław Zieliński.

Personal information
- Born: 24 July 1935 Warsaw, Poland
- Died: 20 September 2025 (aged 90)
Medal record
Men's canoe sprint
Olympic Games
Bronze medal – third place	1960 Rome	K-2 1000 m
World Championships
Gold medal – first place	1958 Prague	K-2 500 m

Władysław Zieliński (24 July 1935 – 20 September 2025) was a Polish sprint canoeist who competed in three Summer Olympics. He won a bronze medal in the K-2 1000 m event at Rome in 1960.

Zieliński also won a gold in the K-2 500 m event at the 1958 ICF Canoe Sprint World Championships in Prague.

Zieliński died on 20 September 2025, at the age of 90.

== Sources ==
- Sports-reference.com profile
