= Paul Lange (canoeist) =

Medal record

Men's canoe sprint

Olympic Games
Gold medal – first place	1960 Rome	K-1 4 × 500 m

World Championships
Gold medal – first place	1958 Prague	K-1 4 × 500 m
Bronze medal – third place	1958 Prague	K-2 500 m

Paul Lange (6 February 1931 – 15 March 2016) was a West German-German sprint canoeist who competed in the late 1950s and early 1960s. He won a gold medal in the K-1 4 × 500 m event at the 1960 Summer Olympics in Rome (with Dieter Krause, Günther Perleberg and Friedhelm Wentzke). Lange also won two medals at the 1958 ICF Canoe Sprint World Championships in Prague with a gold in the K-1 4 × 500 m and a bronze in the K-2 500 m events. He was born in Oberhausen.
