= Froemming =

Froemming is a surname. Notable people with the surname include:

- Bruce Froemming (1939–2026), American baseball umpire
- Theodore C. Froemming (1873–1929), American building contractor and politician

== See also ==
- Froemming Brothers
- Frömming, another surname
