= Vladimír Špaček =

Czechoslovak sprint canoer (born 1939)

Vladimír Špaček (born October 29, 1939 in Trenčín) is a Czechoslovak sprint canoer who competed in the early 1960s. At the 1960 Summer Olympics in Rome, he was disqualified in the heats of the K-1 4 × 500 m event.
