= John Pagkos =

American canoeist

John Pagkos (born January 17, 1936) is an American sprint canoer who competed in the late 1950s and early 1960s. At the 1956 Summer Olympics in Melbourne, he was eliminated in the heats of the K-2 1000 m event. Four years later in Rome, he was eliminated in the repechages of the K-1 4 × 500 m event.

== Results ==
Event name	Team	Result	Sport	Event
Rome 1960	USA	# 3 h2 r2/4	Canoe Sprint	Kayak Relay 4 x 500 meters
Melbourne 1960	USA	# 5 h2 r1/2	Canoe sprint	Kayak Doubles, 1000 meters
