= Leslie Melia =

Les Meliaa
Personal information
- Born: September 10, 1929; Montreal, Quebec, Canada
- Died: June 30, 1997 (aged 67); Moncton, New Brunswick, Canada

Sport
- Sport: Sprint canoeing

Leslie Wilfred John Melia (September 10, 1929 – June 30, 1997) was a Canadian sprint canoer who competed in the late 1950s. At the 1956 Summer Olympics, he was eliminated in the heats of the K-2 1000 m event.
