= Antonio Rucco =

Italian canoeist

Antonio Rucco (5 July 1931 – 8 January 2023) was an Italian sprint canoer who competed in the early 1960s. He finished ninth the K-2 1000 m event at the 1960 Summer Olympics in Rome.
