= Charles Lundmark =

American canoeist

Charles Lundmark (May 6, 1927, in Chicago – August 23, 1999) was an American sprint canoer who competed in the early 1960s. At the 1960 Summer Olympics in Rome, he was eliminated in the repechages of the K-1 4 × 500 m event.

He was a very active member of the Washington Canoe Club. Charles served in the US Army and after retiring from active duty service, he and his wife and two sons lived in Alexandria, Virginia until his death.
