= Cees Lagrand =

Dutch sprint canoer (born 1936)

Cees Lagrand (born 20 October 1936, Zaandam) is a Dutch sprint canoer who competed in the early 1960s. At the 1960 Summer Olympics in Rome, he was eliminated in the heats of the K-1 4 × 500 m event.
