= Paavo Vaskio =

Finnish sprint canoer

Paavo Vaskio (March 1, 1931 – September 26, 2012) was a Finnish sprint canoer who competed in the early 1960s. He was eliminated in the semifinals of the K-1 4 × 500 m event at the 1960 Summer Olympics in Rome. He was born in Helsinki and died in Espoo.
