= Canoeing at the 1956 Summer Olympics – Men's K-1 10000 metres =

The men's K-1 10000 metres was a competition in canoeing at the 1956 Summer Olympics. The K-1 event is raced by single-man canoe sprint kayaks. This would the last time this event was held in the Summer Olympics though it would be held at the ICF Canoe Sprint World Championships from 1938 to 1993.

== Medalists ==
Gold	Silver	Bronze
Gert Fredriksson (SWE)	Ferenc Hatlaczky (HUN)	Michel Scheuer (EUA)

== Final ==
The final took place on November 30.

Gold	Gert Fredriksson (SWE)	47:43.4
Silver	Ferenc Hatlaczky (HUN)	47:53.3
Bronze	Michel Scheuer (EUA)	48:00.3
4.	Thorvald Strömberg (FIN)	48:15.8
5.	Igor Pissarov (URS)	49:58.2
6.	Ladislav Čepčianský (TCH)	50:08.2
7.	Svend Frømming (DEN)	50:10.0
8.	Knut Østby (NOR)	51:28.2
9.	Max Baldwin (AUS)	51:49.7
10.	Lloyd Rice (CAN)	52:00.4
11.	Robert O'Brien (USA)	53:02.8
