= Ivan Simeonov =

Bulgarian canoeist (1926–2018)

Ivan Simeonov (Bulgarian: Иван Симеонов) (October 23, 1926 – December 2018) was a Bulgarian sprint canoer who competed in the early 1960s. He was eliminated in the repechages of the K-2 1000 m event at the 1960 Summer Olympics in Rome.
