= Ryszard Marchlik =

Polish canoeist

Ryszard Marchlik (born 3 November 1939) is a Polish sprint canoer who competed in the 1960s. Competing in three Summer Olympics, he earned his best finish of fourth in the K-1 4 × 500 m event at Rome in 1960.
