= Rolf Björklund =

Rolf Björklund may refer to:

- Rolf Björklund (canoeist) (born 1937), Finnish canoeist
- Rolf Björklund (footballer) (born 1938), Swedish footballer
