= Medal "For the Defence of the Soviet Transarctic" =

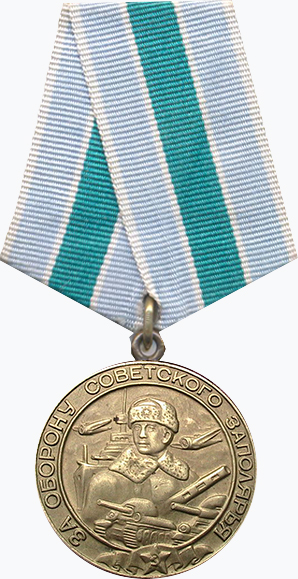
- Medal "For the Defence of the Soviet Transarctic" (obverse)
- Type: Campaign medal
- Awarded for: "Participation in the defence of the Soviet Transarctic"
- Presented by: USSR
- Eligibility: Citizens of the Soviet Union
- Status: No longer awarded
- Established: December 5, 1944

Highlights
- Total: 353,240
- Ribbon of the Medal "For the Defence of the Soviet Transarctic"

Precedence
- Next (higher): Medal "For the Defence of the Caucasus"
- Next (lower): Medal "For the Victory over Germany in the Great Patriotic War 1941–1945"

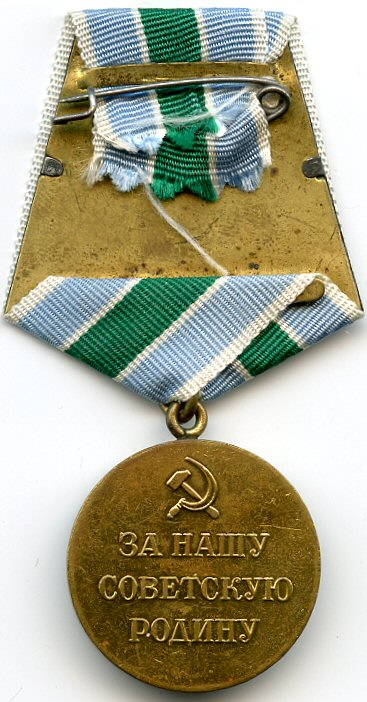
Reverse of the Medal "For the Defence of the Soviet Transarctic"

The Medal "For the Defence of the Soviet Transarctic" (Russian: Медаль «За оборону Советского Заполярья») was a World War II campaign medal of the Soviet Union.

== Medal History ==
The Medal "For the Defence of the Soviet Transarctic" was established on December 5, 1944, by decree of the Presidium of the Supreme Soviet of the USSR to satisfy the petition of the People's Commissariat of Defense of the USSR.

== Medal Statute ==
The Medal "For the Defence of the Soviet Transarctic" was awarded to all participants in the defence of the Soviet Arctic region - soldiers of the Red Army, Navy and troops of the NKVD, as well as persons from the civilian population who took part in the defence of the North.

Award of the medal was made on behalf of the Presidium of the Supreme Soviet of the USSR on the basis of documents attesting to actual participation in the defence of the Soviet Transarctic issued by the unit commander, the chief of the military medical establishment or by the Murmansk Regional or Urban Councils of People's Deputies. Serving military personnel received the medal from their unit commander, retirees from military service received the medal from a regional, municipal or district military commissioner in the recipient's community, members of the civilian population, participants in the defence of the Soviet Transarctic received their medal from the Murmansk Oblast or city Councils of People's Deputies. For the defenders who died in battle or prior to the establishment of the medal, it was awarded posthumously to the family.

The Medal "For the Defence of the Soviet Transarctic" was worn on the left side of the chest and in the presence of other awards of the USSR, was located immediately after the Medal "For the Defence of the Caucasus". If worn in the presence of Orders or medals of the Russian Federation, the latter have precedence.

== Medal Description ==
The Medal "For the Defence of the Soviet Transarctic" was a 32mm in diameter circular brass medal with a raised rim. On its obverse, the bust of a soldier in a sheepskin coat and fur cap carrying a PPSh sub machine gun. To the left of the soldier, the half hidden image of a warship, on both sides of his head, military aircraft in flight, superimposed on the bottom center and bottom right of his coat, two tanks. Along the entire circumference of the obverse, a 3mm band bearing the relief inscription "FOR THE DEFENSE OF THE SOVIET TRANSARCTIC" (Russian: «ЗА ОБОРОНУ СОВЕТСКОГО ЗАПОЛЯРЬЯ»), at the bottom, a five pointed star bearing the hammer and sickle superimposed on a length of ribbon. On the reverse near the top, the relief image of the hammer and sickle, below the image, the relief inscription in three rows "FOR OUR SOVIET MOTHERLAND" (Russian: «ЗА НАШУ СОВЕТСКУЮ РОДИНУ»).

The Medal "For the Defence of the Soviet Transarctic" was secured by a ring through the medal suspension loop to a standard Soviet pentagonal mount covered by a 24mm wide blue silk moiré ribbon with 2mm white edge stripes and a white 6mm central stripe with 1mm white edge stripes.

== Recipients (partial list) ==
The individuals below were all recipients of the Medal "For the Defence of the Soviet Transarctic".

- Marshal of the Soviet Union Kirill Afanasievich Meretskov
- Marshal of the Soviet Union Nikolai Vasilyevich Ogarkov
- Marshal of the Soviet Union Sergei Leonidovich Sokolov
- Sailor and polar explorer Alexey Fyodorovich Tryoshnikov
- Northern Fleet sailor Lev Efimovich Kerbel
- Colonel General Valerian Alexandrovich Frolov
- World War 2 veteran Anatoly Nikolayevich Demitkov
- Lieutenant General Nikolai Pavlovich Simoniak
- Wartime Northern Fleet commander Admiral Arseniy Grigoriyevich Golovko

== See also ==
- Awards and decorations of the Soviet Union
- Arctic convoys of World War II
- Murmansk Oblast
- Murmansk
