= Ruud Knuppe =

Dutch canoeist

Ruud Knuppe (6 August 1938, Amsterdam - 19 April 2002, Jisp) was a Dutch sprint canoer who competed in the early 1960s. At the 1960 Summer Olympics in Rome, he finished seventh in the K-2 1000 m event while being eliminated in the heats of the K-1 4 × 500 m event.
