= Torbjörn Blomqvist =

Finnish sprint canoer (1941–2017)

Torbjörn Blomqvist (February 14, 1941 – February 20, 2017) was a Finnish sprint canoer, who competed in the early 1960s. He was born in Helsinki. He was eliminated in the semifinals of the K-1 4 × 500 m event at the 1960 Summer Olympics in Rome.
