= Léon Klares =

Luxembourgish canoeist (born 1935)

Léon Klares (November 13, 1935 – August 28, 2024) was a Luxembourgish sprint canoer who competed in the early 1960s. He was eliminated in the repechages of the K-2 1000 m event at the 1960 Summer Olympics in Rome.
