= Lyakhov =

Lyakhov or Liakhov (Russian: Ляхов) is a Russian masculine surname, its feminine counterpart is Lyakhova or Liakhova. Notable people with the surname include:

- Ivan Lyakhov (died c. 1800), Russian explorer
- Olha Lyakhova (born 1992), Ukrainian middle-distance runner
- Sergey Lyakhov (born 1968), Russian discus thrower
- Vladimir Liakhov (1869–1919), Russian military commander
- Vladimir Lyakhov (1941–2018), Russian cosmonaut
- Yuliya Lyakhova (born 1977), Russian high jumper

== See also ==
- Lyakhovsky
