= Walter Buchgraber =

Austrian canoeist

Walter Buchgraber (Vienna, 21 November 1938 – December 1992) was an Austrian sprint canoeist who competed in the early 1960s. At the 1960 Summer Olympics in Rome, he was eliminated in the repechages of the K-1 4 × 500 m event.
