= Helmut Holzschuster =

Austrian sprint canoer (born 1935)

Helmut Holzschuster (Linz, October 2, 1935) is an Austrian sprint canoer who competed in the early 1960s. He was eliminated in the semifinals of the K-2 1000 m event at the 1960 Summer Olympics in Rome.
