= Nikolay Rudzinkas =

Medal record

Men's canoe sprint

World Championships
| Bronze medal – third place | 1958 Prague | K-4 10000 m |

Nikolay "Mykolas" Rudzinskas (4 January 1933 – 29 April 2006) was a Soviet sprint canoeist who competed in the late 1950s and early 1960s. He won a bronze medal in the K-4 10000 m event at the 1958 ICF Canoe Sprint World Championships in Prague.

Rudzinskas also finished fourth in the K-2 1000 m event at the 1960 Summer Olympics in Rome.
