= Alan McCleery =

Canadian canoeist (1929–2022)

Alan McCleery (June 13, 1929 – July 1, 2022) was a Canadian sprint canoer, born in Montreal, who competed from the late 1940s through the early 1960s. He was eliminated in the repechage round of the K-2 1000 m event at the 1960 Summer Olympics in Rome.

McCleery grew up in Montreal and started paddling at the Grand Trunk Boating Club on the St Lawrence River. Together with K-2 partner Lou Lukanovich, McCleery qualified for the 1956 Olympic team, but did not compete once it was confirmed that Lukanovich would not be granted Canadian citizenship by the time the games started.

With the Grand Trunk club severely impacted by the construction of the St Lawrence Seaway, McCleery and Lukanovich both moved to the Cartierville Canoe Club in the late 50s. They again qualified for the Olympics in 1960.

McCleery moved to Ottawa in 1976 and was a common sight at the Rideau Canoe Club for more than four decades. He died in Ottawa at the age of 93.
