= Allan Livingstone =

Australian sprint canoeist

Allan Livingstone (14 September 1928 – 10 January 1997) was an Australian sprint canoeist who competed in the early 1960s. He was eliminated in the semifinals of the K-1 4 × 500 m event at the 1960 Summer Olympics in Rome.
