= Lou Lukanovich =

Canadian canoeist

Louis "Lou" Lukanovich (born December 5, 1930) is a Croatian-born, Canadian sprint canoer who competed in the early 1960s. He and partner Alan McCleery were eliminated in the repechage round of the K-2 1000 m event at the 1960 Summer Olympics in Rome.

After his Olympic career, the Zagreb-born Lukanovich went on to a lifetime of involvement in the sport of canoe-kayak. He was a coach for the Canadian team at the Olympic Games in 1972 in Munich and 1976 in Montreal. He is currently the president and chief designer at Simon River Sports, a Quebec-based manufacturer and supplier of canoe-kayak and other sporting equipment. Lukanovich co-founded the Viking Canoe Club in 2001. In 2014 Lukanovich was awarded the Edgar R. Gilbert award by CanoeKayak Canada for his sustained contribution to coaching in the sport.
