= František Vršovský =

Czechoslovak canoeist

František Vršovský (January 6, 1933 – October 3, 2022) was a Czechoslovak sprint canoeist who competed in the early 1960s. At the 1960 Summer Olympics in Rome, he finished sixth in the K-2 1000 m event while being disqualified in the heats of the K-1 4 × 500 m event.
