= Juhani Helenius =

Finnish canoeist

Juhani Helenius (14 May 1933 – 19 February 2010) was a Finnish sprint canoer who competed in the late 1950s. He was born in Hämeenlinna. At the 1956 Summer Olympics, he was disqualified in the heats of the K-2 1000 m event. Four years later in Rome, he was eliminated in the semifinals of the K-1 4 × 500 m event.
