= André Conrardy =

Luxembourgish canoeist

André Conrardy (February 13, 1928 – June 10, 1990) was a Luxembourgish sprint canoer, born in Redange, who competed in the early 1960s. At the 1960 Summer Olympics in Rome, he was eliminated in the repechage round of the K-1 1000 m event.
