= Vladimir Natalukha =

Medal record

Men's canoe sprint

World Championships
Silver medal – second place	1963 Jajce	K-1 4 × 500 m

Vladimir Natalukha (born March 18, 1936) is a Soviet sprint canoer who competed in the early to mid-1960s. He won a silver medal in the K-1 4 × 500 m event at the 1963 ICF Canoe Sprint World Championships in Jajce.

Natalukha also competed at the 1960 Summer Olympics in Rome, finishing fifth in the K-1 4 × 500 m event.
