= Ibragim Khasanov =

Soviet canoeist

Medal record

Men's canoe sprint

World Championships
Silver medal – second place	1963 Jajce	K-1 4 x 500 m

Ibragim Risoyevich Khasanov (4 November 1937 – 2 March 2010) was a Soviet sprint canoer, born in Stalinabad, who competed in the early to mid-1960s. Competing in two Summer Olympics, he earned his best finish of fourth in the K-1 1000 m event at Rome in 1960. Khasanov won a silver medal in the K-1 4 x 500 m event at the 1963 ICF Canoe Sprint World Championships in Jajce. He was a member of the Dushanbe team of the Spartak voluntary sports society.
