= Edward Houston =

American canoeist (born 1937)

Edward Houston (born March 29, 1937) is an American sprint canoer from New York City who competed in the late 1950s. He finished 12th in the K-2 10000 m event at the 1956 Summer Olympics in Melbourne.
