= Renato Ongari =

Italian canoeist

Renato Ongari (July 1, 1935 – October 12, 2016) was an Italian sprint canoer who competed in the early 1960s. At the 1960 Summer Olympics in Rome, he was eliminated in the semifinals of the K-1 4 × 500 m event.
