= Annibale Berton =

Italian canoeist

Annibale Berton (8 March 1936 – 30 December 2004) was an Italian sprint canoer who competed in the early 1960s. At the 1960 Summer Olympics in Rome, he was eliminated in the semifinals of the K-1 4 × 500 m event.
