= Paul Beachem =

American sprint canoer

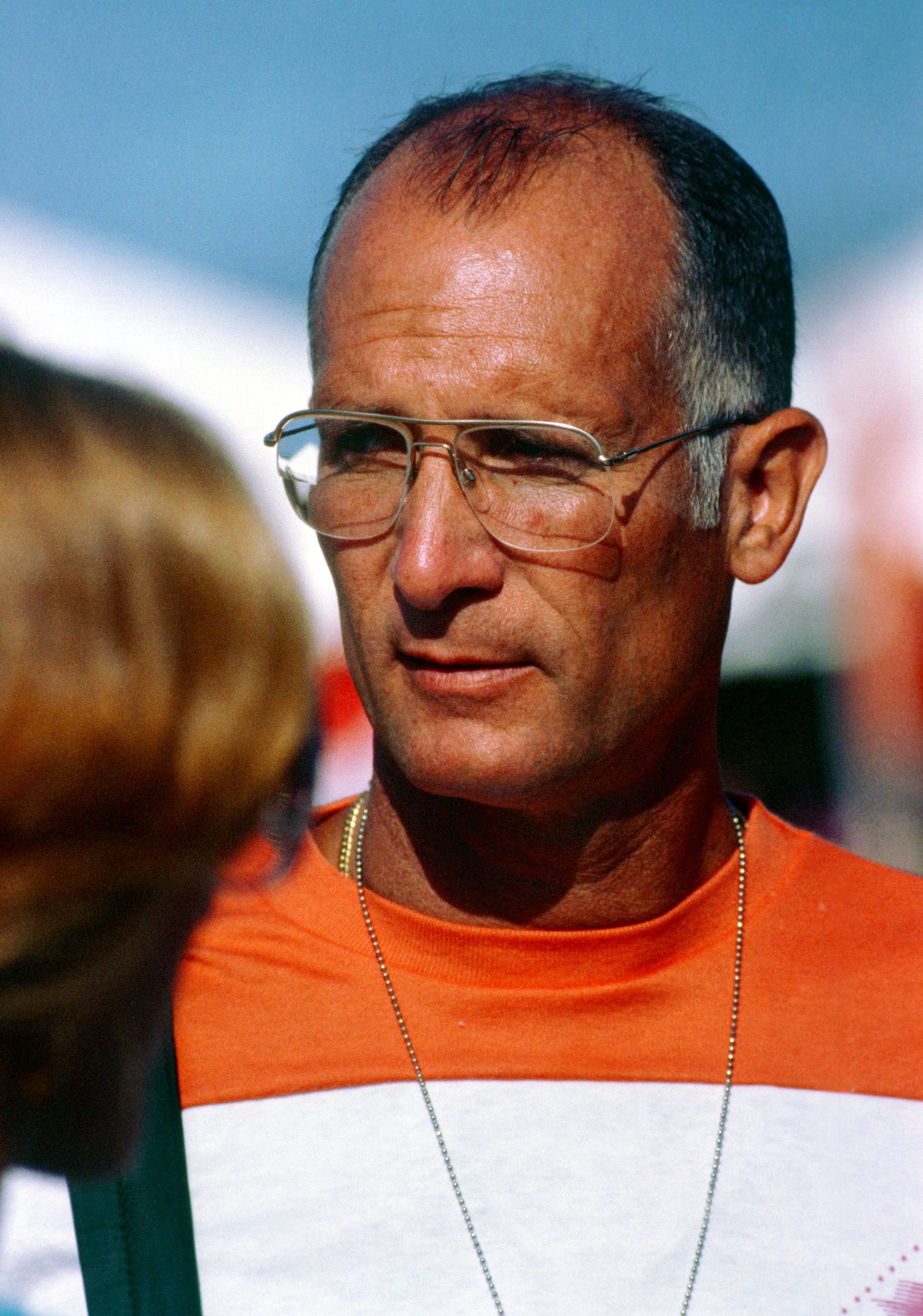
Beachem in 1984

Paul Beachem (born October 14, 1934) is an American sprint canoer who competed in the 1960s. At the 1960 Summer Olympics in Rome, he was eliminated in the semifinals of the K-1 1000 m event. Eight years later in Mexico City, Beachem was eliminated in the repechage round of the K-2 1000 m event.
