= Franz Wolf (canoeist) =

Austrian sprint canoer (born 1938)

Franz Wolf (born 5 July 1938) is an Austrian sprint canoeist who competed in the early 1960s. He was eliminated in the semifinals of the K-2 1000 m event at the 1960 Summer Olympics in Rome.
