= Lloyd Rice =

Canadian canoeist

Lloyd John Rice (September 11, 1928 – September 19, 1996) was a Canadian sprint canoer who competed in the late 1950s. He finished tenth in the K-1 10000 m event at the 1956 Summer Olympics in Melbourne.
