= Lyubomir Oresharov =

Bulgarian sprint canoer (born 1940)

Lyubomir Oresharov (Bulgarian: Любомир Орешаров) (born April 1, 1940) is a Bulgarian sprint canoer who competed in the early 1960s. At the 1960 Summer Olympics in Rome, he was eliminated in the repechages of the K-2 1000 m event.

Oresharov withdrew from the heats in the K-1 1000 m event at those same games.
