= Ivan Golovachyov =

Medal record

Men's canoe sprint

World Championships
Silver medal – second place	1958 Prague	K-2 1000 m

Ivan Golovachyov (Russian: Иван Головачёв; born 21 May 1929) is a Soviet sprint canoeist who competed in the late 1950s. He won a silver medal in the K-2 1000 m event at the 1958 ICF Canoe Sprint World Championships in Prague. Golovachyov also finished fourth in the K-2 1000 m event at the 1960 Summer Olympics in Rome. He was born in Kherson.
