= Pentti Raaskoski =

Finnish canoeist (1929–2014)

Jarmo Pentti Antero Raaskoski (3 March 1929 – 13 October 2014) was a Finnish sprint canoer who competed in the late 1950s. At the 1956 Summer Olympics, he was disqualified in the heats of the K-2 1000 m event. He was born in Porvoo. Raaskoski spent his childhood in Porvoo. His father was a radio repairman and his mother was a baroness. Raaskoski experienced the aerial bombardments of Porvoo during the Continuation War. Towards the end of the war, he started working as a machine forger and was called up for military service in 1949. In 1971, he moved to Sipoos for family reasons. Raaskoski died on 13 October 2014, at the age of 85.

== Sources ==
- Pentti Raaskoski's profile at Sports Reference.com
