= Anatoly Kononenko =

Soviet sprint canoer (1935–2010)

Anatoly Ilyich Kononenko (Russian: Анатолий Ильич Кононенко; February 21, 1935 – April 29, 2010) was a Soviet sprint canoer who competed in the early 1960s. At the 1960 Summer Olympics in Rome, he finished fifth in the K-1 4 × 500 m event. He was born in Rostov-on-Don.
