= Mercurie Ivanov =

Romanian sprint canoer (born 1938)

Mercurie Ivanov (born 24 August 1938) is a Romanian sprint canoer who competed in the early 1960s. He was eliminated in the semifinals of the K-2 1000 m event at the 1960 Summer Olympics in Rome.
