= Dieter Krause =

German sprint canoeist (1936–2020)

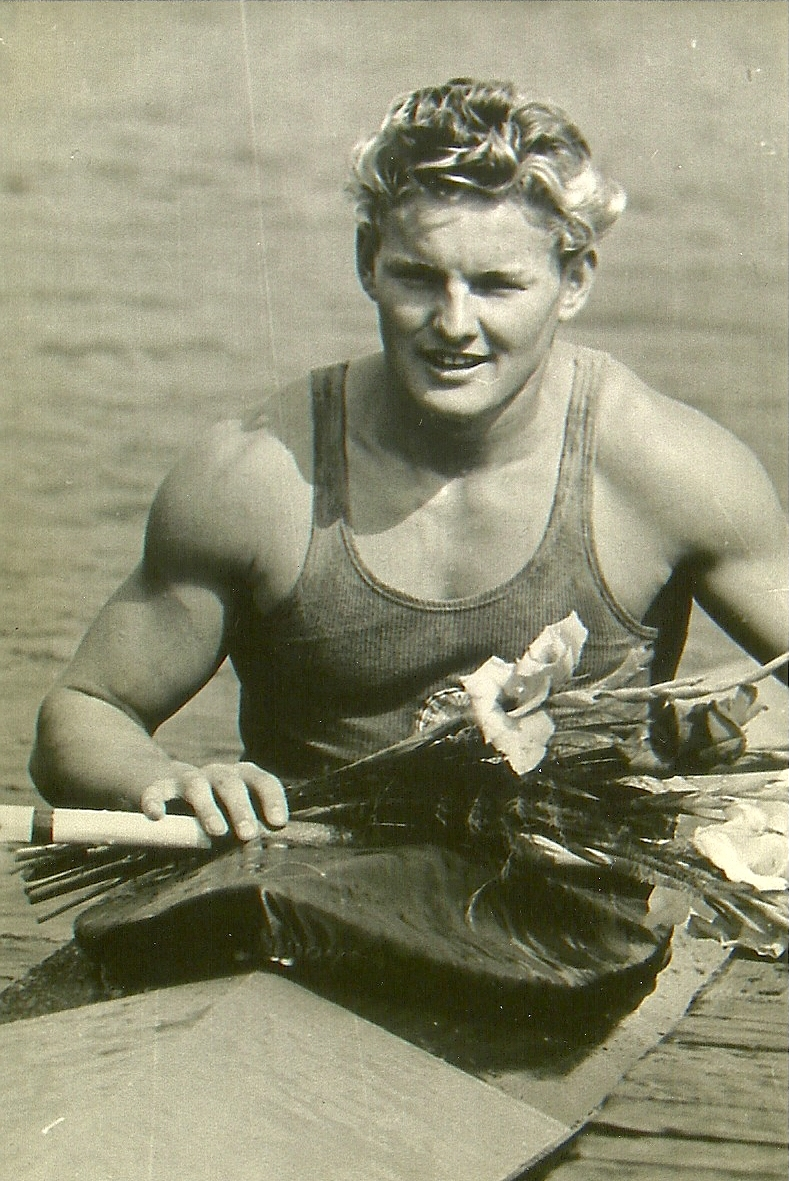

Personal information
- Born: 18 January 1936 Brandenburg an der Havel (Nazi Germany) Germany
- Died: 10 August 2020 (aged 84) Bad Saarow; Germany
- Height: 1.72 m (5 ft 8 in)
- Weight: 74 kg (163 lb)

Sport
- Sport: Canoe sprint
- Club: SC DHfK Leipzig
Medal record
Representing All-German Team
Olympic Games
Gold medal – first place	1960 Rome	K-1 4×500 m
Representing East Germany
World Championships
Gold medal – first place	1963 Jajce	K-4 1000 m
Silver medal – second place	1963 Jajce	K-2 1000 m
Bronze medal – third place	1958 Prague	K-1 500 m
Bronze medal – third place	1963 Jajce	K-1 4×500 m

Dieter Krause (18 January 1936 – 10 August 2020) was a German sprint canoeist who competed from the late 1950s to the mid-1960s. He won a gold medal in the K-1 4×500 m event at the 1960 Summer Olympics in Rome (with Paul Lange, Günther Perleberg and Friedhelm Wentzke).

Krause also won four medals at the ICF Canoe Sprint World Championships with a gold (K-4 1000 m: 1963), a silver (K-2 1000 m: 1963), and two bronzes (K-1 500 m: 1958, K-1 4×500 m: 1963). He was a Stasi informer under the codename "Reiner Lesser".
