= Juan Feliz =

Spanish sprint canoer (born 1937)

Juan Miguel Feliz Bulnes (born 28 May 1937 in Ribadesella) is a Spanish sprint canoeist who competed in the early 1960s. He was eliminated in the semifinals of the K-2 1000 m event at the 1960 Summer Olympics in Rome.
