= Basil Pratt =

British sprint canoer (born 1938)

Rev Basil D Pratt (born 26 June 1938) is a former British canoe sprinter who competed in the early 1960s. He was eliminated in the repechages of the K-2 1000 m event at the 1960 Summer Olympics in Rome. A former Padre in the British Army, Basil Pratt was married on 19 December 1992 at the age of fifty four. He lives with his family in the south-west of Scotland.
