= Frömming =

Frömming is a surname. Notable people with the surname include:

- Ernst Frömming (1911–1959), Luftwaffe officer during World War II
- Götz Frömming (born 1968), German politician
- Johannes Frömming (1910–1996), German harness racer and trainer
- Svend Frømming (1918–1979), Danish sprint canoer
