= Lakhovsky =

Lakhovsky (masculine, Russian: Лаховский) or Lakhovskaya (feminine, Russian: Лаховская) is a Russian surname. Notable people with the surname include:

- Arnold Lakhovsky (1880–1937), Russian–Ukrainian landscape painter
- Georges Lakhovsky (1870–1942), Russian author, engineer, inventor, and scientist

== See also ==
- Lyakhovsky (disambiguation)
