= Jean Friquet =

French sprint canoer (born 1940)

Jean Friquet (born 17 February 1940) is a French sprint canoer. Friquet competed in the early 1960s. At the 1960 Summer Olympics in Rome, he was eliminated in the repechages of the K-1 4 × 500 m event.
