= Henri Amazouze =

French canoeist

Henri Amazouze (1 March 1937 – 8 August 2020) was a French sprint canoer who competed in the early 1960s. At the 1960 Summer Olympics in Rome, he was eliminated in the repechages of the K-1 4 × 500 m event.
