= Ronald Rhodes =

British sprint canoer

Ronald Rhodes (31 October 1937 – 12 January 1962) was a British canoe sprinter who competed in the early 1960s. At the 1960 Summer Olympics in Rome, he finished fifth in K-1 1000 m event while being eliminated in the semifinals of the K-1 4 × 500 m event.

Rhodes was killed in a motorcycle accident in Chelsea, London.
