= Jean Houde =

French canoeist (1939–2026)

Jean Claude Houde (11 September 1939 – 8 June 2026) was a French sprint canoer who competed in the early 1960s. At the 1960 Summer Olympics in Rome, he was eliminated in the repechages of the K-1 4 × 500 m event.

Houde died on 8 June 2026, at the age of 86.
