= Roland Huber =

Swiss canoeist

Roland Huber (born 25 April 1931) is a Swiss sprint canoer who competed in the early 1960s. At the 1960 Summer Olympics in Rome, he was eliminated in the repechages of both the K-1 1000 m event and the K-1 4 × 500 m event.
