= Norway at the 1960 Summer Olympics =

- IOC code: NOR
- NOC: Norwegian Sports Federation

in Rome
- Competitors: 40 in 11 sports
- Flag bearer: Sverre Strandli (athletics)
- Medals Ranked 21st: Gold 1 Silver 0 Bronze 0 Total 1

Summer Olympics appearances (overview)
- 1900; ~~1904~~; 1908; 1912; 1920; 1924; 1928; 1932; 1936; 1948; 1952; 1956; 1960; 1964; 1968; 1972; 1976; 1980; 1984; 1988; 1992; 1996; 2000; 2004; 2008; 2012; 2016; 2020; 2024; 2028

Other related appearances
- 1906 Intercalated Games

Norway competed at the 1960 Summer Olympics in Rome, Italy. 40 competitors, 39 men and 1 woman, took part in 39 events in 11 sports.

== Medalists ==
=== Gold ===
- Peder Lunde Jr. and Bjørn Bergvall – Sailing, Flying Dutchman

== Athletics ==
Men's 100 metres

- Carl Fredrik Bunæs

- Heat – 10.80 s (→ advanced to the quarter-final)
- Quarter final – 10.69 s (→ did not advance)

Men's 200 metres

- Carl Fredrik Bunæs

- Heat – 21.46 s (→ advanced to the quarter-final)
- Quarter final – 21.50 s (→ did not advance)

Men's 1500 metres

- Arne Hamarsland

- Heat – 3:44.63 min (→ advanced to the final)
- Final – 3:45.0 min (→ 9th place)

Men's marathon

- Tor Torgersen – 2:27:30 hrs (→ 26th place)

Men's 110 metres hurdles

- Jan Gulbrandsen

- Heat – 52.39 min (→ advanced to the semi-final)
- Semi final – 52.56 min (→ did not advance)

Men's Long Jump

- Roar Berthelsen

- Qualification – 7.09 m (→ did not advance)

Men's Javelin Throw

- Willy Rasmussen

- Round 1 – 77.95 metres (→ advanced to the final)
- Final – 78.36 metres (→ 5th place)

- Terje Pedersen

- Round 1 – 74.67 metres (→ advanced to the final)
- Final – DNS (→ no ranking)

- Egil Danielsen

- Round 1 – 72.93 metres (→ did not advance)

Women's Javelin Throw

- Unn Thorvaldsen

- Round 1 – 41.99 metres (→ did not advance)

Men's Discus Throw

- Stein Haugen

- Round 1 – 52.75 metres (→ advanced to the final)
- Final – 53.36 metres (→ 11th place)

Men's Hammer Throw

- Sverre Strandli

- Round 1 – 61.41 metres (→ advanced to the final)
- Final – 63.05 metres (→ 11th place)

== Canoeing ==
Two male canoeists represented Norway in 1960.

Men's K-1 1000 metres

- Rolf Olsen (6th)

Men's K-2 1000 metres

- Arne Ervig, Rolf Olsen (Semifinal 2)

== Cycling ==
One male cyclist represented Norway in 1960.

Individual road race

- Per Digerud

== Fencing ==
One fencer represented Norway in 1960.

Men's foil

- Leif Klette

Men's épée

- Leif Klette

== Rowing ==
Norway had two male rowers participate in one out of seven rowing events in 1960.

Men's double sculls

- Harald Kråkenes
- Sverre Kråkenes

== Shooting ==
Six shooters represented Norway in 1960.

25 m pistol

- Nicolaus Zwetnow

50 m pistol

- Kurt Johannessen

50 m rifle, three positions

- Erling Kongshaug
- Magne Landrø

50 m rifle, prone

- Erling Kongshaug
- Tor Richter

Trap

- Hans Aasnæs
