= Edward Cronk =

British sprint canoer

Edward Cronk (5 June 1936 – 31 May 2021) was a British canoe sprinter who competed in the early 1960s. At the 1960 Summer Olympics in Rome, he was eliminated in the semifinals of the K-1 4 × 500 m event.
