= Rolf Björklund (canoeist) =

Finnish sprint canoer (born 1937)

Rolf Björklund (born May 8, 1937, in Helsinki) is a Finnish sprint canoer who competed in the early 1960s. He was eliminated in the semifinals of the K-1 4 × 500 m event at the 1960 Summer Olympics in Rome.
