= Max Baldwin =

Australian canoeist

Max Baldwin (born 4 January 1928) is an Australian canoeist who competed in the 1950s. He finished ninth in the K-1 10000 m event at the 1956 Summer Olympics in Melbourne.

Baldwin lost the use of his left leg due to polio at age one, and walks with crutches. Baldwin's first sport was gymnastics; despite his leg impairment, he won a NSW state championship title. After Baldwin started canoeing, he won several Australian titles. He was the first Australian athlete with a disability to compete in the Olympic Games. Baldwin was made a life member of Gymnastics NSW in 1990 and awarded the Medal of the Order of Australia in 2014, for services to sport.
