= Jerzy Górski =

Polish canoeist

Jerzy Górski (October 27, 1929 – May 24, 1997) was a Polish sprint canoer who competed in the late 1950s. At the 1956 Summer Olympics in Melbourne, he finished tenth in the K-2 10000 m event while being eliminated in heats of the K-2 1000 m event.
