= Alberto Schiavi =

Italian canoeist (born 1939)

Alberto Schiavi (born 23 March 1939) is an Italian sprint canoer who competed in the early 1960s. At the 1960 Summer Olympics in Rome, he was eliminated in the semifinals of the K-1 4 × 500 m event.
