= Joaquín Larroya =

Spanish canoeist (1937–2021)

Joaquín Larroya (7 October 1937 – 14 April 2021) was a Spanish sprint canoer who competed in the early 1960s. At the 1960 Summer Olympics in Rome, he was eliminated in the semifinals of both the K-1 1000 m and K-2 1000 m events.
