= František Říha =

Czechoslovak sprint canoeist (born 1935)

František Říha (born March 8, 1935) is a Czechoslovak sprint canoeist who competed in the early 1960s. He finished sixth the K-2 1000 m event at the 1960 Summer Olympics in Rome.
