= Ion Sideri =

Romanian sprint canoer (1937–2025)

Personal information
- Nationality: Romanian
- Born: 19 January 1937 Constanța, Romania
- Died: 2025

Sport
- Sport: Canoe sprint

Ion Sideri (January 19, 1937 – 2025) was a Romanian sprint canoer who competed in the early 1960s. At the 1960 Summer Olympics in Rome, he finished sixth in the K-1 4 × 500 m event.

Sideri died in 2025.
