= John Harris (canoeist) =

British sprint canoer (born 1938)

John Harris (born 28 May 1938) is a British canoe sprinter who competed in the early 1960s. He was eliminated in the repechages of the K-2 1000 m event at the 1960 Summer Olympics in Rome.

After his career as a canoeist, John Harris attended Birmingham University where he qualified as a doctor. He practiced as a GP for many years before retiring in his 70s. Dr John Harris married and had 3 children.
