= Robert De Waele =

Belgian canoeist

Robert De Waele (Temse, 17 May 1933 – 15 May 1995) was a Belgian canoe sprinter who competed in the early 1960s. At the 1960 Summer Olympics in Rome, he was eliminated in the semifinals of the K-1 1000 m event and the repechages of the K-1 4 × 500 m event.
