= Radovan Božin =

Yugoslav sprint canoeist (born 1940)

Radovan Božin (born 4 May 1940 in Novi Sad) is a Yugoslav sprint canoeist who competed in the 1960s. He was eliminated in the semifinal round of the K-2 1000 m event at the 1960 Summer Olympics in Rome. He placed fifth at the European Championships in 1961 and was considered a "well-known" figure in Yugoslavian rowing.
