= Karl Leitner =

Austrian canoeist (born 1937)

Karl Leitner (Innsbruck, 26 November 1937) is an Austrian sprint canoer who competed in the early 1960s. At the 1960 Summer Olympics in Rome, he was eliminated in the repechages of the K-1 4 × 500 m event.
