= Miroslav Jemelka =

Czechoslovak sprint canoer (born 1931)

Miroslav Jemelka (born 28 July 1931 in Olomouc) is a Czechoslovak sprint canoer who competed in the late 1950s. At the 1956 Summer Olympics in Melbourne, he finished sixth in the K-2 10000 m and eighth in the K-2 1000 m events with Rudolf Klabouch.

== Sources ==
- Sports-reference.com profile
