= Werner Weber (canoeist) =

Swiss sprint canoer (born 1939)

Werner Weber (born 17 February 1939) is a Swiss sprint canoer who competed in the early 1960s. At the 1960 Summer Olympics in Rome, he was eliminated in the repechages of the K-1 4 × 500 m event.
