= Miroslav Pavelec =

Czechoslovak canoeist (1927–2019)

Miroslav Pavelec (19 November 1927 in Městec Králové - 11 February 2019) was a Czechoslovak sprint canoer who competed in the early 1960s. At the 1960 Summer Olympics in Rome, he was disqualified in the heats of the K-1 4 × 500 m event.

Pavelec was a founding member of the Lokomotiva Nymburk speed canoeing club. He won the title of Champion of the Czechoslovak Republic and, as well as the Olympics in Rome, completed in several world championships.
