= Rudolf Klabouch =

Czech sprint canoer

Rudolf Klabouch (born 29 October 1929) is a Czech sprint canoeist who competed for Czechoslovakia in the 1950s. He was born in Prague. Competing in two Summer Olympics, he earned his best finish of sixth in the K-2 10000 m event at Melbourne in 1956 with Miroslav Jemelka in Melbourne and Bedřich Dvořák in Helsinki.
