= Hermann Salzner =

Medal record

Men's canoe sprint

World Championships
Bronze medal – third place	1954 Mâcon	K-1 4 x 500 m

Hermann Salzner (Linz, 15 July 1928 – 30 October 2010) was an Austrian sprint canoeist who competed from the mid-1950s to the early 1960s. He won a bronze medal in the K-1 4 x 500 m event at the 1954 ICF Canoe Sprint World Championships in Mâcon. Salzner also competed in two Summer Olympics, earning his best finish of 11th in the K-2 10000 m event at Melbourne in 1956.
