= Lorenzo Cantarello =

Italian sprint canoer (1932–2013)

Lorenzo Cantarello (March 28, 1932 – January 26, 2013) was an Italian sprint canoer who competed in the early 1960s. He finished ninth the K-2 1000 m event at the 1960 Summer Olympics in Rome. He was a brother of Vasco Cantarello.
