= Kjell-Åke Nilsson (footballer) =

Swedish footballer

Personal information
- Full name: Kjell-Åke Nilsson
- Position: Forward

Senior career*
Years	Team	Apps	(Gls)
1962–1963	Malmö FF	11	(3)
- * Club domestic league appearances and goals

Kjell-Åke Nilsson is a Swedish former footballer who played as a forward.
