= Pierre Derivery =

French sprint canoer

Pierre Derivery (4 November 1925 – 24 November 2013) was a French sprint canoer who competed from the early 1950s to the early 1960s. Competing in two Summer Olympics, he earned his best finish of tenth in the K-1 10000 m event at Helsinki in 1952.

== Bibliography ==
- Pierre Derivery's profile at Sports Reference.com
- Pierre Derivery's obituary (in French)
