= Yvan Decock =

Belgian sprint canoer (born 1941)

Yvan Decock (born 1 July 1941 in Kortrijk) is a Belgian canoe sprinter who competed in the early 1960s. At the 1960 Summer Olympics in Rome, he was eliminated in the repechages of the K-1 4 × 500 m event.
