= John Wolters (canoeist) =

American canoeist (born 1940)

John Wolters (born September 9, 1940) is an American sprint canoeist who competed in the early 1960s. He was eliminated in the semifinal round of the K-2 1000 m event at the 1960 Summer Olympics in Rome.
