= Mircea Anastasescu =

Romanian sprint canoer

Medal record

Men's canoe sprint

World Championships
Silver medal – second place	1963 Jajce	K-2 500 m
Bronze medal – third place	1954 Mâcon	K-1 500 m

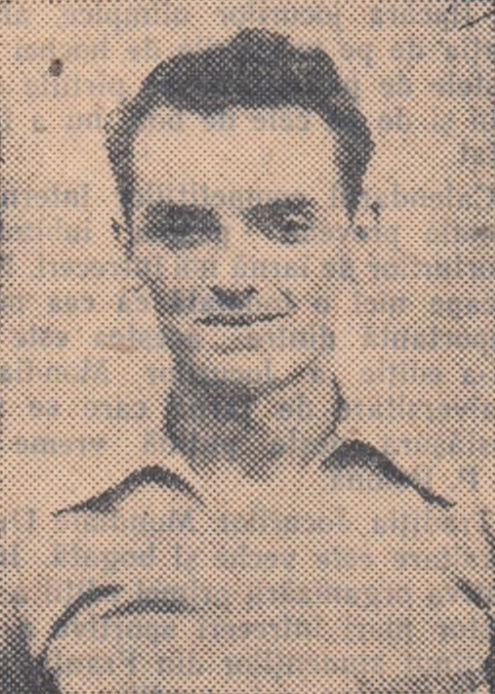
Mircea Anastasescu

Mircea Anastasescu (18 March 1931 – December 1987) was a Romanian sprint canoer who competed from the early 1950s to the early 1960s. He won two medals at the ICF Canoe Sprint World Championships with a silver (K-2 500 m: 1963) and a bronze (K-1 500 m: 1954). He was born in Bucharest.

Anastasescu also competed in three Summer Olympics, earning his best finish of fourth in the K-2 1000 m event at Melbourne in 1956.
