= Hans Straub (canoeist) =

Swiss canoeist

Hans Straub (born 27 May 1928) is a Swiss sprint canoeist who competed from the late 1940s to the early 1960s. Competing in three Summer Olympics, he was eliminated in the heats or repechage rounds at all three games. Straub's best finish was fourth in the repêchage round of the K-1 4 × 500 m event at Rome in 1960
