= Stavru Teodorov =

Romanian sprint canoer (born 1931)

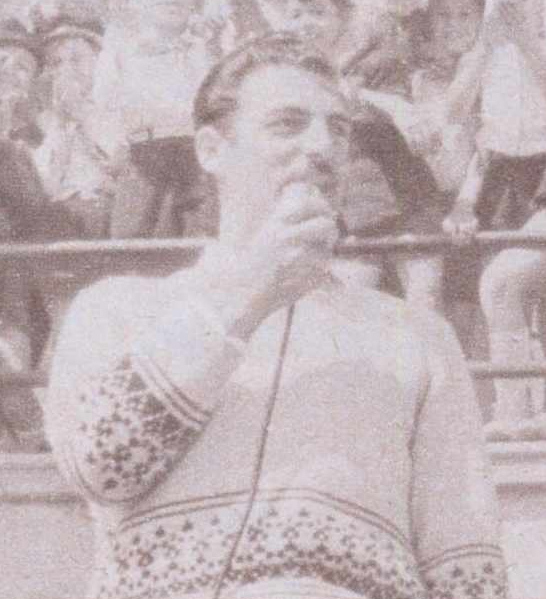

Sport
- Country: Romania
- Sport: Rowing

Stavru Teodorov (11 July 1931 – 2003) was a Romanian sprint canoer who competed in the late 1950s. He competed in two Summer Olympics; his best finish was fourth in the K-2 1000 m event at Melbourne in 1956.
