= Rolf Åkerfelt =

Finnish canoeist (born 1941)

Rolf Åkerfelt (born July 13, 1941, in Ekenäs) is a Finnish sprint canoer who competed in the early 1960s. He was eliminated in the semifinals of the K-2 1000 m event at the 1960 Summer Olympics in Rome.
