= Maurice Graffen =

French canoeist

Medal record

Men's canoe sprint

World Championships
Bronze medal – third place	1954 Mâcon	K-4 1000 m

Maurice Graffen (22 October 1924 – 4 December 2016) was a French sprint kayaker who competed from the late 1940s to the late 1950s. He won a bronze medal in the K-4 1000 m event at the 1954 ICF Canoe Sprint World Championships in Mâcon. Graffen also competed in three Summer Olympics, earning his best finish of fifth in the K-2 1000 m event at Melbourne in 1956.
