= Pierre Decock =

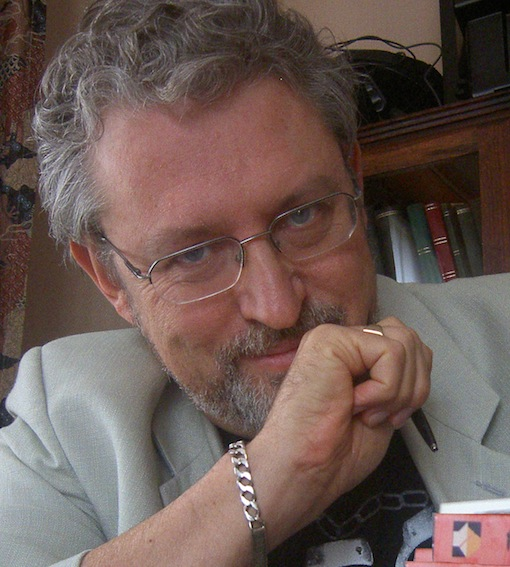
Pierre Decock

Pierre Decock (born 19 August 1959 in Belgium), is a Belgian-Luxembourgish historian, writer, comic draftsman, illustrator, painter, computer scientist and financial adviser.

He has lived and worked in Luxembourg since 1985 and became a citizen in 2003. He writes in French language.

== Early life ==
He studied contemporary history.

== Historian ==
Decock began his career as a historian. He published articles on the “Dame blanche”, a secret network in the First World War, and a biography of Gabrielle Petit, a Belgian heroine in that war.

== Luxembourg ==
In 1985, Decock settled in Luxembourg as a computer scientist and financial adviser. He illustrated some publications and drew comics, particularly in the child newspaper “Zack.”

His first novel, Toccata, is similar to The Da Vinci Code, with an original composition of Bach playing a central role. The story is set in Luxembourg and in Baden-Württemberg. In 2008 Toccata received the “Reader prize of the Greater Region” (Prix des lecteurs de la Grande-région).

His second novel, De Profundis, sets the young Luxembourg policeman João Da Costa Rebelo after a serial killer.

== Selected publications ==
- La Dame Blanche 1916-1918; Revue belge d’histoire militaire XXVII-3.
- Toccata; Op der Lay, Esch-Sauer; 2007; ISBN 978-2-87967-146-8.
- De Profundis ... au seuil des ténèbres je t'attendrai; Op der Lay 157. Esch-Sauer; 2009; ISBN 978-2-87967-160-4.
- Den Tun an de Frunnes: Alles an der Rei; Luxemburgisch von Gaston Zangerlé. Zack Publications. Ed. Saint-Paul, Luxembourg; 1996.
- * Pierre Decock (10 August 2010). La Dame Blanche. un réseau de renseignements de la Grande Guerre. Lulu.com. pp. 276–. ISBN 978-1-4452-9704-0.
- Pierre Decock (18 August 2010). Les mésaventures informatiques de Monsieur Bromfiets. Lulu.com. ISBN 978-1-4452-9434-6.
- K (nouvelle), in Gréng getëppelt, blo gesträift (anthologie 2009 des Walfer Bicherdeeg), Luxembourg, 2009, p. 114-119.
- Petite musique de nuit (nouvelle), in Saz fir Saz (anthologie 2010 des Walfer Bicherdeeg), Luxembourg, 2010, p. 56-61.
- In Articulo Mortis, Editions Guy Binsfeld. Luxembourg. 2011, 223 p. ISBN 978-2-87954-247-8
- Les corbeaux de Greenwood, Editions Guy Binsfeld, 2012, 136 p. ISBN 978-2-87954-253-9
- Petits plaisirs et entourloupes de la langue française, lulu.com, 2014, 155 p. ISBN 978-1-291-78369-8
- Tun, Frunnes a co: Décke Gas!; Luxemburgisch von Gaston Zangerlé. Ed. Revue, Luxembourg, 2015.
