= Åke Nilsson (canoeist) =

Swedish canoeist

Ake Nilsson
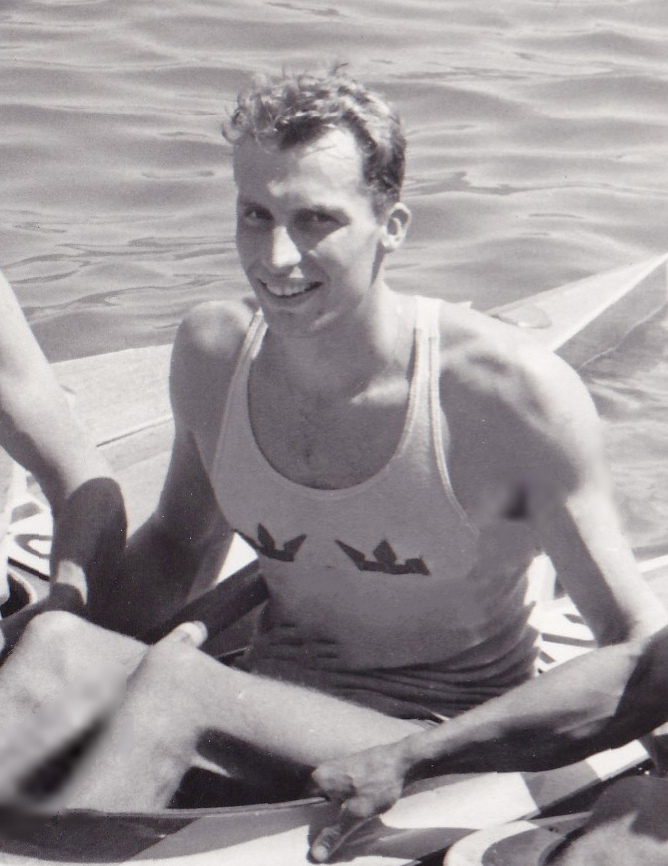
- Nilsson at the 1960 Olympics

Personal information
- Full name: Karl Åke Nilsson
- Born: 12 December 1937 Nyköping, Sweden
- Died: 31 October 2005 (aged 67) Nyköping, Sweden
- Height: 1.90 m (6 ft 3 in)
- Weight: 76 kg (168 lb)

Sport
- Sport: Canoe sprint
- Club: Nyköpings Kanotklubb

Karl Åke Nilsson (12 December 1937 – 31 October 2005) was a Swedish sprint canoeist who competed in the early 1960s. At the 1960 Summer Olympics in Rome, he was eliminated in the repechages of the K-1 4 × 500 m event.
