= Kenneth Wilson (canoeist) =

American canoeist

Kenneth Wilson (born November 30, 1938) is an American sprint canoer who competed in the late 1950s and early 1960s. Competing two Summer Olympics, he earned his best finish of 12th in the K-2 10000 m event at Melbourne in 1956.
