= Meinrad Miltenberger =

German canoeist

Medal record

Men's canoe sprint

Olympic Games
Gold medal – first place	1956 Melbourne	K-2 1000 m

World Championships
Gold medal – first place	1954 Mâcon	K-2 500 m
Gold medal – first place	1958 Prague	K-1 4 x 500 m
Silver medal – second place	1954 Mâcon	K-1 500 m
Bronze medal – third place	1958 Prague	K-2 500 m

Meinrad Miltenberger (6 December 1924, Herdecke, Westphalia – 10 September 1993, Herdecke) was a German canoe sprinter who competed in the 1950s. Competing in two Summer Olympics, he won a gold medal in the K-2 1000 m event at Melbourne in 1956.

Miltenberger also won four medals at the ICF Canoe Sprint World Championships with two golds (K-1 4 x 500 m: 1958, K-2 500 m: 1954), a silver (K-1 500 m: 1954), and a bronze (K-2 500 m: 1958).
