= Imre Kemecsey =

Hungarian canoeist (born 1941)

Medal record

Men's canoe sprint

Olympic Games
Silver medal – second place	1960 Rome	K-1 4 × 500 m

World Championships
Silver medal – second place	1966 East Berlin	K-1 4 × 500 m
Bronze medal – third place	1966 East Berlin	K-1 1000 m

Imre Kemecsey (born 11 February 1941) is a Hungarian sprint canoeist who competed in 1960s. Competing in two Summer Olympics, he won a silver in the K-1 4 × 500 m event at Rome in 1960.

Kemecsey also won two medals at the 1966 ICF Canoe Sprint World Championships in East Berlin with a silver in the K-1 4 × 500 m and a bronze in the K-1 1000 m events.
