= Simo Kuismanen =

Finnish canoeist

Simo Kuismanen (22 July 1932 – 21 October 2015) was a Finnish sprint canoeist who competed in the late 1950s and early 1960s. Competing in two Summer Olympics, he earned his best finish of seventh in the K-2 10000 m event at Melbourne in 1956. He was born in Sortavala.
