= Brian Bullivant =

British sprint canoer

Brian Milton Bullivant (10 February 1927 – 24 November 2013) was a British canoe sprinter who competed in the late 1950s. At the 1956 Summer Olympics in Melbourne, he finished eighth in the K-2 10000 m event and ninth in the K-2 10000 m event.
