= Killings of Russell and Shirley Dermond =

Unsolved murders in Putnam County, Georgia

Russell and Shirley Dermond
- Family photo, date unknown
- Born: Russell Joseph Dermond; June 6, 1925; Shirley Bell Wilcox; July 7, 1926
- Died: Putnam County, Georgia, U.S.
- Cause of death: Gunshot wound (Russell); Blunt-force trauma (Shirley)
- Body discovered: May 6, 2014 (Russell); May 16, 2014 (Shirley)
- Occupation: Retired

The murders of Russell and Shirley Dermond occurred in early May 2014 in Putnam County, Georgia, United States. The decapitated body of Russell Dermond (age 88) was found on May 6, 2014, in the garage of the house he owned on Lake Oconee. Neither his head nor his wife, Shirley (age 87), could be located in the house. Over a week later, Shirley's body was discovered floating in Lake Oconee, her body having been weighted down with concrete blocks. As of April 2026, the murders remain unsolved and Russell's head has not been found.

== Background ==
Russell Joseph Dermond, a native of Hackensack, New Jersey, served in the United States Navy during World War II. He married Shirley Wilcox on December 15, 1950. They went on to have four children and nine grandchildren. After working in the fast food industry, including owning several Hardee's locations in Atlanta, Russell retired in 1994. The Dermonds went on to move into Great Waters Reynolds at Lake Oconee, a gated community located about twelve miles northeast of Eatonton. In 2000, their oldest son Mark was murdered in Atlanta while attempting to purchase crack cocaine. Investigators believe that there is no connection between this crime and the murder of Mark's parents.

Russell was last seen alive on May 1, 2014, as he was running errands in Eatonton. Along with Shirley, he spoke with his son Brad over the phone later that day. The Dermonds were expected to attend a party for the 2014 Kentucky Derby the following weekend with their neighbors, who grew concerned when the couple did not show up. On May 6, one neighbor went to the Dermonds' house to check on them. The neighbor found the door unlocked and entered the house. Russell's decapitated body was found on the floor of his two-car garage, lying in a small pool of blood. When police were unable to locate Shirley inside the house, they initially suspected that she had been kidnapped. Ten days later, Shirley's body was found by fishermen on Lake Oconee. An autopsy found that she had died from either two or three deep wounds to the head from a blunt object.

== Investigations ==
Initially, investigators were pursuing multiple potential leads to find the perpetrator(s) and their motive for killing the Dermonds. However, this eventually led nowhere, and over time the leads gradually declined in frequency. Although the perpetrator(s) and motive remain unknown, Putnam County Sheriff Howard Sills has said he is convinced that multiple people were involved. Because gunshot residue was found on Russell's collar, Sills believes he was decapitated after having been shot in the head in an attempt to prevent police from finding the bullet, and that the perpetrator(s) went to the Dermonds' home intending to obtain money, despite the fact that nothing in the home was stolen.

== See also ==
- Crime in Georgia (U.S. state)
- List of unsolved murders (2000–present)
- List of solved missing person cases (post-2000)
