= Robert O'Brien (canoeist) =

American canoeist

Robert O'Brien (born June 6, 1933) is an American sprint canoer who competed in the late 1950s and early 1960s. Competing in two Summer Olympics, he earned his best finish of 11th in the K-1 10000 m event at Melbourne in 1956.
