= Walter Brown (canoeist) =

Australian canoeist

Olympic medal record

Men's canoe sprint
Bronze medal – third place	1956 Melbourne	K-2 10000 m

Walter William Brown (31 May 1925 – 15 April 2011 in Botany, New South Wales) was an Australian sprint canoeist who competed in the late 1950s. He won a bronze medal in the K-2 10000 m event at the 1956 Summer Olympics in Melbourne, with his kayak partner Dennis Green.
