= Marcel Lentz =

Luxembourgish sprint canoeist

Marcel Lentz (2 June 1929 – 9 April 2008) was a Luxembourgish sprint canoeist who competed from the late 1940s to the early 1960s. He was born in Luxembourg City. Competing in two Summer Olympics, he earned his best finish of 13th in the K-1 10000 m event at London in 1948.
