= Imre Szöllősi =

Hungarian canoeist (1941–2022)

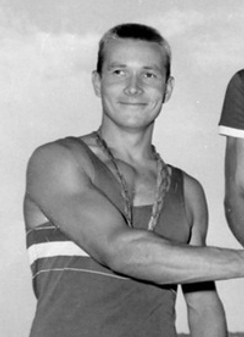
- Szöllősi at the 1960 Olympics

Personal information
- Born: 19 February 1941 Budapest, Hungary
- Died: 27 December 2022 (aged 81) Budapest, Hungary
- Height: 183 cm (6 ft 0 in)
- Weight: 83 kg (183 lb)

Sport
- Sport: Canoe sprint
- Club: Újpesti Dózsa Sportegyesület; Budai Spartacus Sport Club
Medal record
Representing Hungary
Olympic Games
Silver medal – second place	1960 Rome	K-1 1000 m
Silver medal – second place	1960 Rome	K-1 4 × 500 m relay
Bronze medal – third place	1968 Mexico City	K-4 1000 m
Canoe Sprint World Championships
Gold medal – first place	1966 East Berlin	K-2 10000 m
Silver medal – second place	1966 East Berlin	K-4 10000 m
Silver medal – second place	1970 Copenhagen	K-2 10000 m

Imre Szöllősi (19 February 1941 – 27 December 2022) was a Hungarian sprint canoeist who competed in the 1960, 1964, and 1968 Olympics. He won two silver medals in 1960: in the individual 1000 m and 4×500 m relay events, and a bronze in 1968 in the fours. In 1964 he placed fourth-fifth in the doubles and fours.

Szöllősi also won three medals at the ICF Canoe Sprint World Championships, with a gold in K-2 10,000 m in 1966 and two silvers: in K-2 10,000 m in 1970 and in K-4 10,000 m in 1966.

Szöllősi died on 27 December 2022, at the age of 81.
