= Russell Dermond =

American canoeist

Russell Charles "Chick" Dermond (December 31, 1936, in Fair Lawn, New Jersey – May 9, 2015) was an American sprint canoer who competed in the late 1950s and early 1960s. His early years were spent in the American Canoe Association as a flatwater racer and began in the wooden "peanut," which was the predecessor of modern kayaks and C boats. A many-time national champion, he competed in the 1956 and 1960 Olympics. At the 1956 Summer Olympics in Melbourne, he was eliminated in the heats of the K-2 1000 m event. Four years later in Rome, he was eliminated in the repechages of the K-1 4 × 500 m event. He attended as Team Manager in 1972 and later served on the U.S. Olympic Committee. He was very active in the ACA, serving in a number of governing positions including Sugar Island in the Thousand Islands and Lake Sebago in Harriman State Park.

Dermond was a resident of Westwood, New Jersey.
