= Rainer Åkerfelt =

Finnish canoeist (1934–2016)

Rainer Robert Åkerfelt (2 December 1934 – 22 November 2016) was a Finnish sprint canoer who competed in the early 1960s. He was eliminated in the semifinals of the K-2 1000 m event at the 1960 Summer Olympics in Rome. Åkerfel was born in Snappertuna on 2 December 1934. He died on 22 November 2016, at the age of 81.

== Sources ==
- Sports-reference.com profile
