= Fyodor Lyakhovsky =

Fyodor Petrovich Lyakhovsky, also known as Fedir Petrovych Liakhovskiy, (14 February 1936 – 30 May 2017) was a Soviet sprint canoer who competed in the early 1960s. At the 1960 Summer Olympics in Rome, he finished fifth in the K-1 4 × 500 m event.
