= Svend Frømming =

Danish canoeist (1918–1979)

Medal record

Men's canoe sprint

World Championships
Silver medal – second place	1950 Copenhagen	K-2 10000 m

Svend Frømming (August 15, 1918 – April 7, 1979) was a Danish sprint canoer who competed in the 1950s. He won a silver medal in the K-2 10000 m event at the 1950 ICF Canoe Sprint World Championships in Copenhagen.

Frømming also competed in two Summer Olympics, earning his best finish of seventh in the K-1 10000 m event at Melbourne in 1956.
