= Vagn Schmidt =

Danish sprint canoeist (born 1935)

Medal record

Men's canoe sprint

World Championships
| Bronze medal – third place | 1958 Prague | K-1 10000 m |

Arthur Vagn Schmidt (born January 15, 1935) is a Danish sprint canoeist who competed in the late 1950s and early 1960s. He won a bronze medal in the K-1 10000 m event at the 1958 ICF Canoe Sprint World Championships in Prague.

Schmidt also finished fifth in the K-2 1000 m event at the 1960 Summer Olympics in Rome.
