= Michel Scheuer =

West German canoe racer (1927–2015)

Medal record

Men's canoe sprint

Representing West Germany

Olympic Games
Gold medal – first place	1956 Melbourne	K-2 1000 m
Bronze medal – third place	1952 Helsinki	K-1 10000 m
Bronze medal – third place	1956 Melbourne	K-1 10000 m

World Championships
Gold medal – first place	1958 Prague	K-4 1000 m
Gold medal – first place	1958 Prague	K-4 10000 m
Silver medal – second place	1954 Mâcon	K-2 1000 m

Michel Scheuer (20 May 1927 – 31 March 2015) was a West German sprint canoeist, born in Rodange, Luxembourg, who competed in the 1950s. Competing in two Summer Olympics, he won three medals with a gold (1956: K-2 1000 m) and two bronzes (1952, 1956: K-1 10000 m).

Scheuer also won three medals at the ICF Canoe Sprint World Championships; two gold (K-4 1000 m and K-4 10000 m: both 1958) and a silver (K-2 1000m:1954). Scheuer died at the age of 87 in 2015.
