= Vasco Cantarello =

Italian rower (1936–2024)

Personal information
- Nationality: Italian
- Born: 8 April 1936; Padua, Italy
- Died: 16 February 2024 (aged 87); Verbania, Italy

Sport
- Sport: Rowing

Vasco Cantarello (8 April 1936 – 16 February 2024) was an Italian rower. He competed in the men's eight event at the 1960 Summer Olympics. He was a brother of Lorenzo Cantarello. Vasco Cantarello died in Verbania on 16 February 2024, at the age of 87.
