= Anna Kaaleste =

Soviet cross-country skier

Personal information
- Nationality: Russian
- Born: 17 January 1930 Pargolovo, Russian SFSR, Soviet Union
- Died: 16 July 2014 (aged 84) St-Petersburg, Russia

Sport
- Sport: Cross-country skiing

Anna Kaaleste (née Mukhina; 17 January 1930 – 16 July 2014) was a Soviet cross-country skier. She competed in the women's 10 kilometres at the 1956 Winter Olympics. Kaaleste was married to Estonian sprint canoeist Mikhail Kaaleste.

== Cross-country skiing results ==
=== Olympic Games ===
Year	Age	10 km	3 × 5 km relay
1956	26	9	—
