= Raymond Blick =

British sprint canoer

Raymond Blick (born 27 May 1930) is a British canoe sprinter who competed in the late 1950s and early 1960s. Competing in two Summer Olympics, he earned his best finish of eighth in the K-2 10000 m event at Melbourne in 1956.
