= Herbert Wiedermann =

Austrian canoeist (1927–2014)

Medal record

Men's canoe sprint

Olympic Games
Bronze medal – third place	1952 Helsinki	K-2 1000 m
Bronze medal – third place	1956 Melbourne	K-2 1000 m

World Championships
Gold medal – first place	1954 Mâcon	K-2 10000 m
Bronze medal – third place	1950 Copenhagen	K-1 4 x 500 m
Bronze medal – third place	1950 Copenhagen	K-2 500 m
Bronze medal – third place	1954 Mâcon	K-1 4 x 500 m

Herbert Wiedermann (1 November 1927 - 6 May 2014) was an Austrian former sprint canoeist who competed from the early 1950s to the early 1960s. Competing in three Summer Olympics, he won two bronze medals in the K-2 1000 m event (1952, 1956). Wiedermann also won four medals at the ICF Canoe Sprint World Championships with a gold (K-2 10000 m: 1954) and three bronzes (K-1 4 x 500 m: 1950, 1954; K-2 500 m: 1950).
