= Ryszard Skwarski =

Polish canoeist

Ryszard Skwarski (5 April 1930 in Zakroczym - 1 June 1996) was a Polish sprint canoer who competed in the late 1950s and early 1960s. Competing in two Summer Olympics, he earned his best finish of fourth in the K-1 4 × 500 m event at Rome in 1960.
