= Germain Van der Moere =

Belgian canoeist

Medal record

Men's canoe sprint

World Championships
Gold medal – first place	1958 Prague	K-2 1000 m

Germain Van der Moere (Ghent, 29 November 1922 – 11 May 2018) was a Belgian sprint canoeist who competed from the mid-1950s to the early 1960s. He won a gold medal in the K-2 1000 m event at the 1958 ICF Canoe Sprint World Championships in Prague. Van Der Moere also competed in two Summer Olympics, earning his best finish of sixth in the K-2 1000 m event at Melbourne in 1956.
