= Henri Verbrugghe =

Sportsperson

Medal record

Men's canoe sprint

Representing Belgium

World Championships
Gold medal – first place	1958 Prague	K-2 1000 m

Hendrik "Henri" Verbrugghe (Mechelen, 20 July 1929 – Bonheiden, 9 July 2009) was a Belgian sprint canoeist who competed from the early 1950s to the mid-1960s. He won a gold medal in the K-2 1000 m event at the 1958 ICF Canoe Sprint World Championships in Prague.

Verbrugghe also competed in four Summer Olympics, earning his best finish of sixth in the K-2 1000 m event at Melbourne in 1956.
