= Mikhail Kaaleste =

Estonian canoeist

Mihhail Kaaleste
Personal information
- Nationality: Estonian
- Born: 20 August 1931 Väike-Vertuskino, Saatse Vald, Petseri County, Estonia
- Died: 5 May 2018 (aged 86)

Sport
- Sport: canoe sprint
Medal record
Men's canoe sprint
Olympic Games
Silver medal – second place	1956 Melbourne	K-2 1000 m
World Championships
Bronze medal – third place	1958 Prague	K-2 1000 m
Bronze medal – third place	1958 Prague	K-4 1000 m

Mikhail Kaaleste (born Mihail Stoljarov; 20 August 1931 – 5 May 2018) was an Estonian sprint canoeist who competed in 1950s. He won a silver medal in the K-2 1000 m event at the 1956 Summer Olympics in Melbourne.

Kaaleste changed his last name in 1940 from Stoljarov. Originally going into cross-country skiing, he was changed to sprint canoeing by his coaches at Dynamo Sports Club. After winning a silver medal in Melbourne, Kaaleste won two bronze medals at the 1958 ICF Canoe Sprint World Championships in Prague (K-2 1000 m, K-4 1000 m). He also won several medals in the Soviet Union in cross-country skiing in the 1950s.

In 1964, he became coach for the Dynamo Leningrad biathlon and cross-country skiing. Kaaleste's wife, Anna, finished ninth in the 10 km cross-country skiing event at the 1956 Winter Olympics in Cortina d'Ampezzo.
