= Rolf Olsen (canoeist) =

Norwegian canoeist (born 1938)

Rolf Olsen (born April 27, 1938) is a Norwegian sprint canoer who competed in the 1960s. Competing in two Summer Olympics, he earned his best finish of sixth in K-1 1000 m event at Rome in 1960.
