= Michel Meyer =

French canoeist

Michel Meyer (born 3 December 1936) is a French sprint canoeist, born in Paris, who competed in the late 1950s and early 1960s. Competing in two Summer Olympics, he earned his best finish of fifth in the K-2 1000 m event at Melbourne in 1956.
