= Erling Jessen =

Danish canoeist

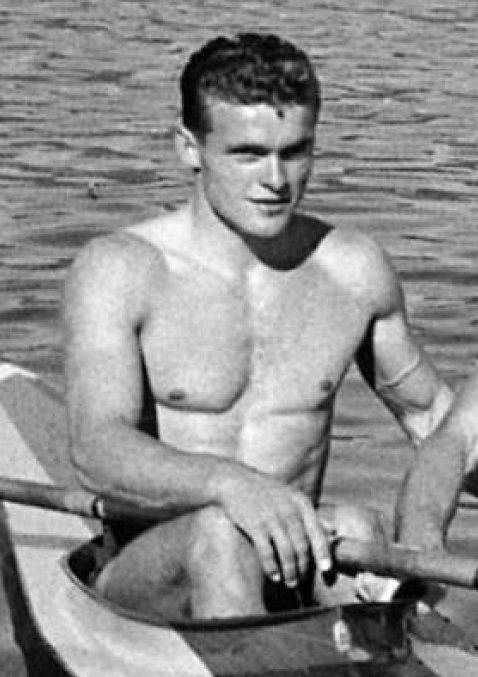
- Jessen in 1960

Personal information
- Born: 31 August 1938 (age 87) Kolding, Denmark
- Height: 174 cm (5 ft 9 in)
- Weight: 75 kg (165 lb)

Sport
- Sport: Canoe racing
- Club: Kajakklubben Pagaj, Holstebro
Medal record
Representing Denmark
Olympic Games
Bronze medal – third place	1960 Rome	K-1 4×500 m

Erling Jessen (born 31 August 1938) is a Danish former canoe sprinter who won a bronze medal in the K-1 4×500 m relay at the 1960 Summer Olympics. In 1970–71 he was chairman of the Stoholm IF club.
