= Erik Hansen (canoeist) =

Danish canoeist

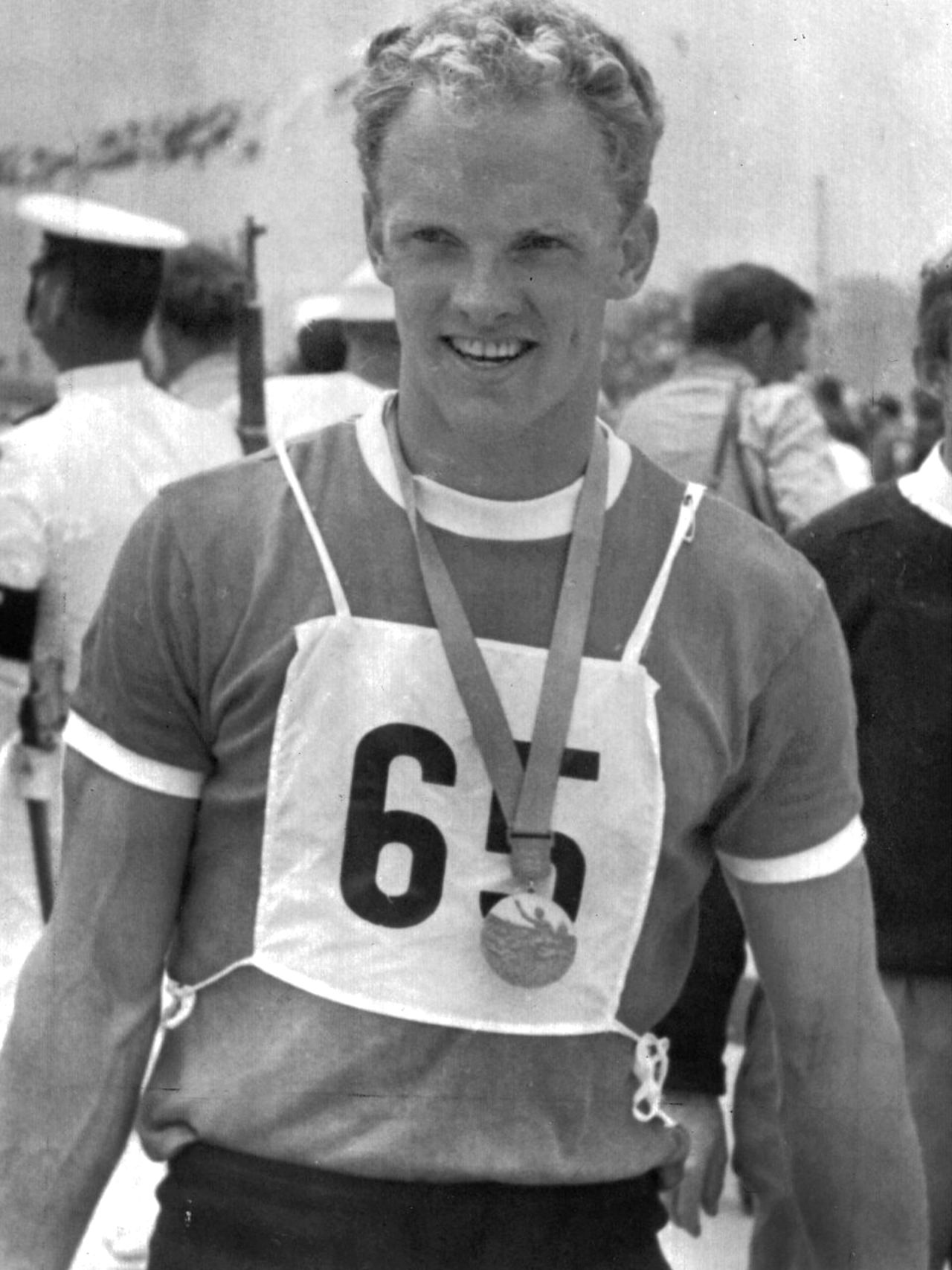
- Hansen at the 1968 Olympics

Personal information
- Born: 15 November 1939 Randers, Denmark
- Died: 30 September 2014 (aged 74)
- Height: 182 cm (6 ft 0 in)
- Weight: 77 kg (170 lb)

Sport
- Sport: Canoe racing
- Club: Kajakklubben Pagaj, Holstebro
Medal record
Representing Denmark
Olympic Games
Gold medal – first place	1960 Rome	K-1 1000 m
Bronze medal – third place	1960 Rome	K-1 4×500 m relay
Bronze medal – third place	1968 Mexico City	K-1 1000 m
World Championships
Gold medal – first place	1963 Jajce	K-1 1000 m
Silver medal – second place	1963 Jajce	K-1 500 m
Silver medal – second place	1966 East Berlin	K-1 500 m
Silver medal – second place	1966 East Berlin	K-1 1000 m
Silver medal – second place	1970 Copenhagen	K-1 10000 m

Erik Rosendahl Hansen (15 November 1939 – 30 September 2014) was a Danish sprint canoeist who competed in singles at the 1960, 1964, 1968 and 1972 Olympics. He won one gold and two bronze medals in 1960 and 1968 and placed seventh in 1964 and 1972. In 1968 he served as the Olympic flag bearer for Denmark.

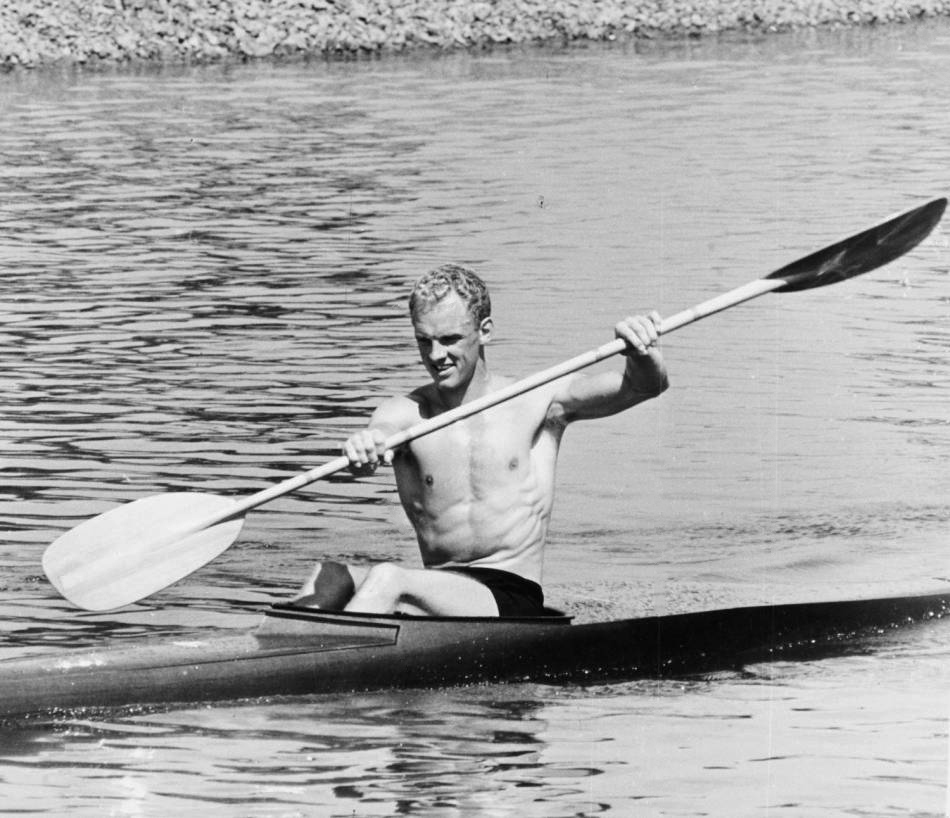
Erik Hansen in 1960

Between 1958 and 1972 Hansen won 37 Danish titles and seven medals at the European Championships; he also earned five medals at the ICF Canoe Sprint World Championships: one gold (K-1 1000 m: 1963) and four silvers (K-1 500 m: 1963, 1966; K-1 1000 m: 1966, K-1 10000 m: 1970).
