= Helmuth Nyborg =

Danish psychologist and author (born 1937)

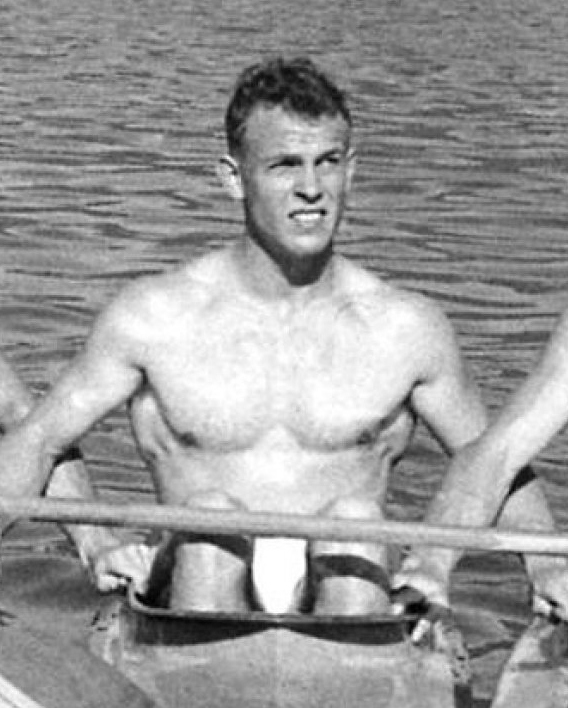
- Nyborg at the 1960 Olympics
- Born: Helmuth Sørensen Nyborg; 5 January 1937 (age 89)
- Citizenship: Danish
- Known for: Heritability of IQ, sex and intelligence
- Scientific career
- Fields: Developmental psychology
- Workplaces: Aarhus University
- Sports career
- Height: 180 cm (71 in)
- Weight: 75 kg (165 lb)
- Sport: Canoe racing
- Club: Skovshoved Kano og Kajak Klub
Medal record
Representing Denmark
Olympic Games
Bronze medal – third place	1960 Rome	K-1 4×500 m

Helmuth Sørensen Nyborg (born 5 January 1937) is a Danish psychologist, writer, far-right politician and former Olympic canoeist. He is a former professor of developmental psychology at Aarhus University. His main research topic is the connection between hormones and intelligence. Among other things, he has worked on increasing the intelligence of girls with Turner's syndrome by giving them estrogen. He has also stood as a candidate for the far-right party Stram Kurs. His publications have been described as scientific racism.

Nyborg is a controversial figure among the Danish public for his research on topics such as the inheritance of intelligence and the relationship between sex and intelligence. In 2004, he wrote an article in Personality and Individual Differences which claimed a five-point average IQ difference in favour of men. This led to strong reactions, for example in an editorial by the Danish newspaper Politiken. In 2011, he argued in an article that migration from third-world countries to Denmark would cause a dysgenic effect on the country's average IQ over time.

Nyborg has argued that white people tend to be more intelligent than black people, that immigration from non-Western countries leads to a decline in the average intelligence of the receiving Western country, and that atheists tend to be more intelligent than religious people. His papers have been criticized within and outside academia and in 2013, the Danish Committees for Scientific Dishonesty (DCSD) ruled that he committed scientific misconduct in his paper The Decay of Western Civilization: Double Relaxed Darwinian Selection. This decision was later overturned by a Danish court, clearing him of the charges.

== Olympic kayaking ==
Nyborg competed as a canoe sprinter in the early 1960s. He won a bronze medal for Denmark in the K-1 4×500 m relay at the 1960 Summer Olympics in Rome.

== Sex-related differences in general intelligence (2005) ==
Nyborg's 2005 paper Sex-related differences in general intelligence g, brain size, and social status was published in Personality and Individual Differences. Nyborg was suspended following criticism of his research. Aarhus University assembled a committee to investigate, and found him innocent of fraud, but guilty of "grossly negligent behavior" and gave him a severe reprimand. He was eventually acquitted by the Danish Committees on Scientific Dishonesty of the charges of scientific misconduct and the university was forced to reinstall him to his chair. On 21 September 2006, the university gave Nyborg a "severe reprimand", revoked his suspension, and declared the case closed. According to a 2006 news story in Science: "Colleagues from around the world have rallied to his defense, accusing the university of having political motives, and claiming that the errors in his research were trivial."

== The Decay of Western Civilization: Double Relaxed Darwinian Selection (2011) ==
In 2011 Nyborg published "The Decay of Western Civilization: Double Relaxed Darwinian Selection" in the journal Personality and Individual Differences, arguing that Denmark was likely to experience a dysgenic effect on intelligence due to immigration from the Middle East. Following publication he was indicted by the Danish Committees on Scientific Dishonesty (DCSD), accused of scientific misconduct and of plagiarism by a number of scholars from the University of Aarhus. They accused him of using a statistical model for the demographic prognoses that was based on the work of Jørn Ebbe Vig, without giving credit, and for using misleading statistics by assuming that Middle Eastern people in Denmark maintained the same reproduction rates as in their countries of origin. Vig had previously published similar demographic models in the journal of Den Danske Forening, a Danish nationalist organization.

As a result, on 31 October 2013 he was convicted of scientific misconduct by the Danish Council for Scientific Misconduct after a two-year investigation. They found him guilty on two charges out of six in total, of which the last was "various other complaints". The first was that he had published the paper without crediting as co-author Jørn Ebbe Vig, whose previously published texts were incorporated into the article without acknowledgement. The DCSD considered that Vig should have been credited, because of the substantial contribution, in terms of data, method and text. Nyborg stated that he had offered co-authorship to Vig, but that the offer was declined and Vig had requested not to be mentioned, making Nyborg choose to publish it himself.

The second charge was that Nyborg had neglected to mention in the methodology section that he had converted a total fertility rate into a crude birth rate, a mistake which, because of its consequences, the DCSD considered to be equivalent to constructing data without acknowledging having done so, or substituting fictive data. When Nyborg learned that this was a problem, he sent an addendum to the journal, which is common practice when errors or omissions are found in published papers. However, the DCSD still considered it scientific misconduct, since they considered it an example of gross negligence.

In 2015, the journal published an editorial commenting on the paper concluding that Nyborg had not committed fraud or plagiarism. This conclusion was based on the verdict of an ad hoc working group consisting of Ian Deary, Jelte Wicherts, John Loehlin and William Revelle. Nyborg then sued the DCSD to get the verdict reversed, won his case in March 2016, and in addition was awarded costs of over 200,000 kr (approximately US$25,000).

== Views and involvement with far-right groups ==
Nyborg stood as a candidate for Stram Kurs, a far-right political party. He is a member of New Right (Denmark).

Nyborg has been criticised for holding pseudohistorical Nordicist and white supremacist beliefs linked to Richard Lynn's cold winter theory including the idea that ancient Egypt, Greece, and Rome civilisations were founded by central-northern European peoples who migrated south. Nyborg describes his idea as the "Thermodynamic Solar Irradiance Selection (TSIS) Hypothesis," which argues "that "Northern brains" had given birth to most positive traits in society, including "altruistic sociability" and "potential for democracy."

He has been quoted as saying (while relying on a map by Charles Murray), "almost all the major advancements in science and the arts since the 14th Century came from White males whose ancestors were born in a tiny, circumscribed chunk of Europe."

Discussing his attendance at a white nationalist conference and his past controversial publications on race; Donna Minkowitz has commented that Nyborg "has been getting white supremacist work published in academic journals for 30 years".

Nyborg has published in the Mankind Quarterly journal which has been described as a "pseudo-scholarly outlet for promoting racial inequality".

In 2011, Nyborg was a speaker at a private seminar hosted by the Danish Society for Historical Research, titled "Revolt Against Civilization" that featured anti-Semites and white nationalists including David Duke former grand wizard of the Ku Klux Klan, Kevin MacDonald and Tomislav Sunić. In 2016, Nyborg was interviewed by alt-right podcaster Stefan Molyneux. The interview was promoted on neo-Nazi website, The Daily Stormer. In 2017, Nyborg spoke at a conference organised by the white nationalist American Renaissance. In 2018, Nyborg spoke at the far-right Scandza Forum conference in Copenhagen, Denmark having met "top people from the Alt-Right movement". The following year in Oslo, Norway he spoke at another annual Scandza Forum conference alongside white nationalist Greg Johnson. In 2022, Nyborg spoke at a Traditional Britain Group conference. Other speakers included Emil Kirkegaard and AfD politician Christine Anderson.

Nyborg has attended the London Conference on Intelligence and was one of 15 attendees to collaborate on a letter defending the conference following media reports of its ties to white supremacy, neo-Nazism, and racist pseudoscience.

In response to why he has attended and spoken at numerous far-right conferences, Nyborg has stated "I have lectured to hundreds of organizations, and some have probably been Nazi as well. I don't really care about that. Everyone deserves access to a scientific message."

== Publications ==
Nyborg is the editor of a 2003 festschrift, The Scientific Study of General Intelligence: Tribute to Arthur Jensen, published by Pergamon Press (ISBN 0080437931). In 2012, he was the editor of a special issue of Personality and Individual Differences dedicated to celebrating the 80th birthday of another controversial psychometrician, British psychologist Richard Lynn.

== See also ==
- Sex and intelligence
