= Günter Perleberg =

German canoeist (1935–2019)

Personal information
- Born: 17 March 1935 Brandenburg an der Havel, Germany
- Died: 1 August 2019 (aged 84) Garbsen, Germany
- Height: 192 cm (6 ft 4 in)
- Weight: 90 kg (198 lb)

Sport
- Sport: Canoeing
- Club: SC Magdeburg
Medal record
Men's canoe sprint
Representing Germany
Olympic Games
| Gold medal – first place | 1960 Rome | K-1 4 × 500 m |
| Silver medal – second place | 1964 Tokyo | K-4 1000 m |
Representing East Germany
World Championships
| Gold medal – first place | 1963 Jajce | K-4 1000 m |
| Bronze medal – third place | 1963 Jajce | K-1 4 × 500 m |

Günter Perleberg also spelled Günther; (17 March 1935 – 1 August 2019) was a German sprint canoeist who competed in the early 1960s. Competing in two Summer Olympics, he won two medals with a gold in the K-1 4 × 500 m (1960 with the East German team) and a silver in the K-4 1000 m (1964 with the West German team).

Perleberg was born in Brandenburg an der Havel in 1935. He trained with SC Aufbau Magdeburg under Ernst Schmidt.

Perleberg won two medals for East Germany at the 1963 ICF Canoe Sprint World Championships in Jajce with a gold in the K-4 1000 m and a bronze in the K-1 4 × 500 m events. On the last day of the 1963 World Championships he defected to West Germany via Austria to be with his pregnant girlfriend in Havelse near Hanover. Perleberg's status as a Republikflüchtling ("deserter from the republic") caused considerable friction between the two German national committees for determining the United Team of Germany at the 1964 Summer Olympics. In the end, Avery Brundage as President of the International Olympic Committee suggested that separate qualification races be held; those involving Perleberg in West Germany and those not involving him in East Germany. That suggestion was followed and Perleberg qualified in the K-4 at the Wedau Regatta Course in Duisburg while the other races were held at the regatta course in Grünau in East Berlin. He acted as an official for the canoeing association in Lower Saxony after his active career.

By profession a civil engineer, he had a civil engineering consultancy in Garbsen.
