= Friedhelm Wentzke =

German canoeist (1935–2026)

Personal information
- Born: 13 September 1935 Castrop-Rauxel, Germany
- Died: 23 May 2026 (aged 90)
Medal record
Representing West Germany
Men's canoe sprint
Gold medal – first place	1960 Rome	K-1 4 × 500 m
Silver medal – second place	1964 Tokyo	K-4 1000 m

Friedhelm Wentzke (13 September 1935 – 23 May 2026) was a German sprint canoeist who competed in the early to mid-1960s. Competing in two Summer Olympics, he won two medals with a gold in the K-1 4 × 500 m (1960) and a silver in the K-4 1000 m (1964).

Wentzke died on 23 May 2026, at the age of 90.
