= Dennis Green (canoeist) =

Australian canoeist (1931–2018)

Personal information
- Full name: Dennis Allan Green
- Nationality: Australian
- Born: 26 May 1931 Epping, New South Wales
- Died: 5 September 2018 (aged 87) Sydney, New South Wales

Sport
- Country: Australia
- Sport: canoe sprint, Ironman surf lifesaving
Medal record
Men's canoe sprint
| Bronze medal – third place | 1956 Melbourne | K-2 10000 m |

Dennis Allan Green OAM BEM (26 May 1931 – 5 September 2018) was an Australian sprint canoeist, surf lifesaver, coach and sporting administrator who competed from the late 1950s to the early 1970s. He was the first Australian to compete in five Summer Olympics, and he won a bronze medal in the K-2 10000 m event at Melbourne in 1956. He also won 57 Gold Medals at the World Masters Games and a further 75 at national level.

== Personal ==
Green was born in Epping, New South Wales on 26 May 1931. He was married to Shirley and they had two daughters – Christine and Karen. From 2012 until his death, he and Shirley lived in Little Bay, New South Wales. Green died of cancer, aged 87, on 5 September 2018.

== Canoeing ==
Green's Olympic Games record:

- 1956 – Men's K-2 1000m – 7th final ; Men's K- 2 10000m – Bronze Medal with Wally Brown
- 1960 – Men's K-2 1000 – 6th semi-final; Men's K Relay – 3rd semi-final
- 1964 – Men's K-4 1000m – 9th final
- 1968 – Men's K-4 1000m – 4th semi-final
- 1972 – Men's K-4 1000m – 5th semi-final

Between 1955 and 1974, Green whilst representing St George Club won 64 Australian championships (singles, pairs and fours), including 18 pairs events with Barry Stuart between 1955 and 1974. He won 79 New South Wales state titles.

In 1976, he was appointed coach of the national kayak team. At the age of 60, Green accepted the position of QLD Regional Director of Coaching for Canoeing at the Queensland Academy of Sport and he remained coaching in Queensland until 2012.

== Surf Life Saving ==
At the age of 15, Green joined Maroubra Surf Life Saving Club. Between 1954 and 1967, he won eight Australian open double ski championships. He won the Australian open single ski championships in 1964/65, and the international single ski title at the Olympic carnival held in association with the 1956 Olympic Games.

In 1981, at the age of 50, Green reached the final of the surf ski at the World Surf Titles in Bali, and he continued to compete in the surf in open events until 1984.

== Recognition ==
- 1972 – Flag bearer Australian Team at the 1972 Munich Olympics
- 1977 – Order of the British Empire – Medal (Civil) / British Empire Medal (Civil) (Imperial)
- 1978 – inaugural Australian Olympic Committee Order of Merit
- 1979 – New South Wales Hall of Champions inductee
- 1986 – Sport Australia Hall of Fame inductee
- 2000 – Australian Sports Medal
- 2005 – Surf Life Saving Australia Life Membership.
- 2007 – Medal of the Order of Australia (OAM)
- 2014 – Surf Lifesaving's Walk of Fame at Maroubra Beach
- 2017 – Paddle Australia Hall of Fame
