= Sven-Olov Sjödelius =

Swedish canoeist (1933–2018)

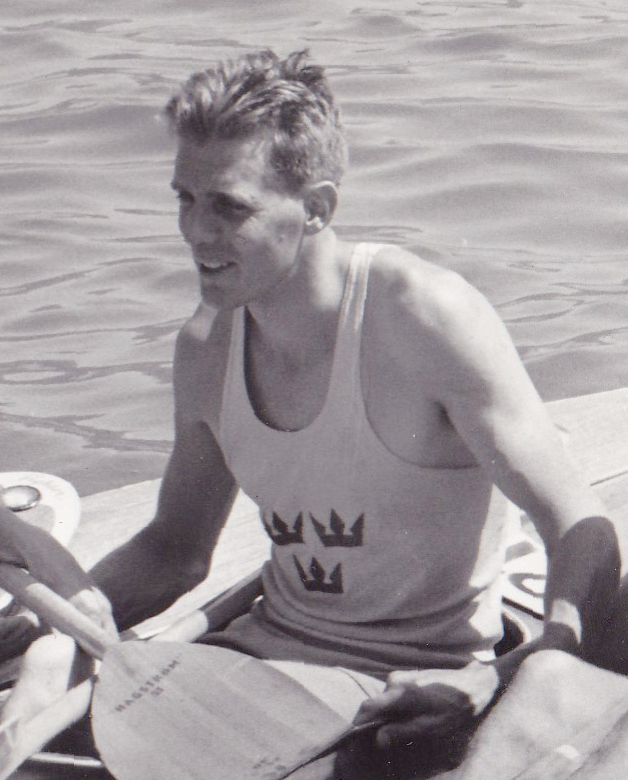
- Sven-Olov Sjödelius at the 1960 Olympics

Personal information
- Full name: Sven-Olov Sjödelius
- Nationality: Swedish
- Born: 13 June 1933 Svärta, Sweden
- Died: 29 March 2018 (aged 84)
- Height: 1.80 m (5 ft 11 in)
- Weight: 67 kg (148 lb)

Sport
- Country: Sweden
- Sport: Canoe sprint
- Club: Nyköpings Kanotklubb
Medal record
Representing Sweden
Olympic Games
Gold medal – first place	1960 Rome	K-2 1000 m
Gold medal – first place	1964 Tokyo	K-2 1000 m
World Championships
Silver medal – second place	1950 Copenhagen	K-4 1000 m
Bronze medal – third place	1958 Prague	K-1 4×500 m
Silver medal – second place	1963 Jajce	K-1 10000 m

Sven-Olov Sjödelius (13 June 1933 – 29 March 2018) was a Swedish sprint canoeist who competed from the early 1950s to the early 1960s. He won two gold medals in the K-2 1000 m event at the 1960 and 1964 Olympics, as well as three medals at the ICF Canoe Sprint World Championships.
