= Gert Fredriksson =

Swedish canoeist (1919–2006)

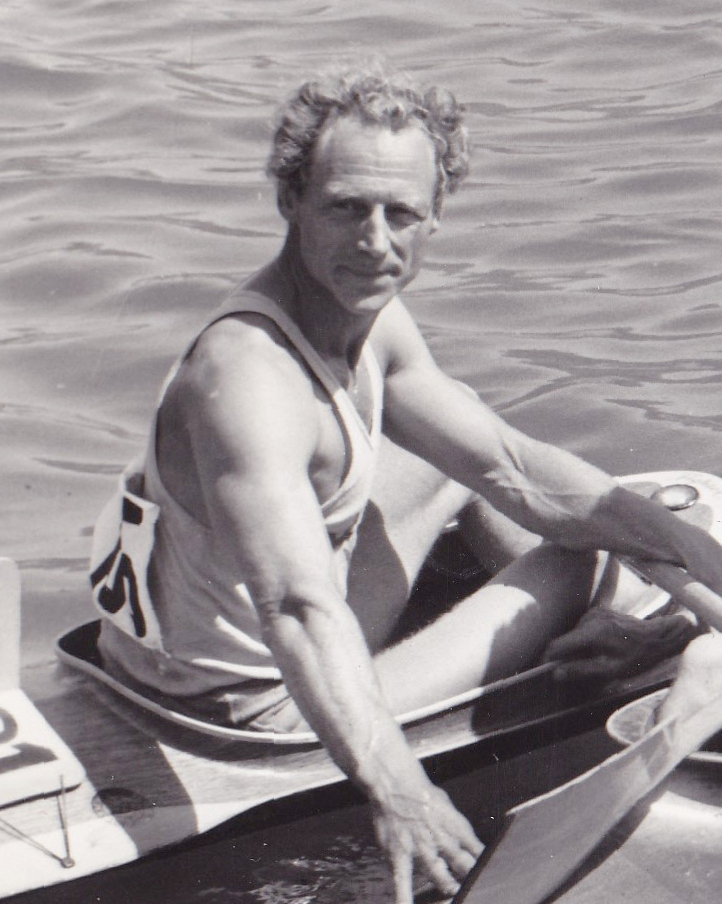
- Gert Fredriksson at the 1960 Olympics

Personal information
- Full name: Gert Fridolf Fredriksson
- Born: 21 November 1919 Nyköping, Sweden
- Died: 5 July 2006 (aged 86) Nyköping, Sweden
- Height: 1.76 m (5 ft 9 in)
- Weight: 72 kg (159 lb)

Sport
- Sport: Canoe sprint
- Club: Nyköpings Kanotklubb
Medal record
Representing Sweden
Olympic Games
Gold medal – first place	1948 London	K-1 1000 m
Gold medal – first place	1948 London	K-1 10000 m
Gold medal – first place	1952 Helsinki	K-1 1000 m
Gold medal – first place	1956 Melbourne	K-1 1000 m
Gold medal – first place	1956 Melbourne	K-1 10000 m
Gold medal – first place	1960 Rome	K-2 1000 m
Silver medal – second place	1952 Helsinki	K-1 10000 m
Bronze medal – third place	1960 Rome	K-1 1000 m
World Championships
Gold medal – first place	1948 London	K-1 500 m
Gold medal – first place	1948 London	K-1 4×500 m
Gold medal – first place	1950 Copenhagen	K-1 1000 m
Gold medal – first place	1950 Copenhagen	K-1 4×500 m
Gold medal – first place	1954 Mâcon	K-1 500 m
Gold medal – first place	1954 Mâcon	K-1 1000 m
Gold medal – first place	1954 Mâcon	K-1 4×500 m
Silver medal – second place	1950 Copenhagen	K-1 10000 m
Silver medal – second place	1958 Prague	K-1 500 m
Bronze medal – third place	1958 Prague	K-1 1000 m
Bronze medal – third place	1958 Prague	K-1 4×500 m

Gert Fridolf Fredriksson (21 November 1919 – 5 July 2006) was a Swedish sprint canoeist. Competing in four Summer Olympics, he won eight medals including six golds (1948: K-1 1000 m, K-1 10000 m; 1952: K-1 1000 m, 1956: K-1 1000 m, K-1 10000 m; 1960: K-2 1000 m), one silver (1952: K-1 10000 m), and one bronze (K-1 1000 m). At the 1964 Summer Olympics in Tokyo, Fredriksson was head coach of the Swedish team.

He was the most successful male canoeist ever, having gained medals in a succession of Swedish, Nordic, World and Olympic championships from 1942 to 1960. With six gold medals Fredriksson remains the most successful Swede at the Olympics.

He also won seven gold medals at the World Championships and 71 medals in the Swedish championships.

Fredriksson was awarded the Svenska Dagbladet Gold Medal in 1949. In 1956 he was awarded the Mohammad Taher trophy by the International Olympic Committee as the number one sportsman in the world, the only canoeist to be presented with this trophy.

Nordic Championships
Year	Event	Gold	Silver	Bronze
1946–1955	K-1 500 m	2
1946–1955	K-1 1000 m	5
1946–1955	K-1 10000 m	5
1946–1955	K-1 4×500 m relay	5
Total		17

Swedish Championships
Year	Event	Gold	Silver	Bronze
1942–1960	K-1 500 m	1	1
1942–1960	K-1 1000 m	16	1	1
1942–1960	K-1 10000 m	15		1
Total		32	2	2

== See also ==
- List of multiple Olympic gold medalists

Preceded by William Grut	Svenska Dagbladet Gold Medal; 1949	Succeeded by Lennart Bergelin
