= Stefan Kapłaniak =

Polish sprint canoer (1933–2021)

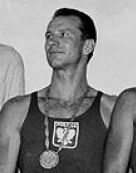
- Stefan Kapłaniak as a Men's K-2 1000 metres medalist at the 1960 Summer Olympics.

Personal information
- Born: 10 April 1933 Szczawnica, Poland
- Died: 8 August 2021 (aged 88) Chicago, U.S.
Medal record
Men's canoe sprint
Olympic Games
Bronze medal – third place	1960 Rome	K-2 1000 m
World Championships
Gold medal – first place	1958 Prague	K-1 500 m
Gold medal – first place	1958 Prague	K-2 500 m

Stefan Kapłaniak "Cenek" (10 April 1933 – 8 August 2021) was a Polish canoe sprinter who competed from the late 1950s to the mid-1960s. Competing in three Summer Olympics, he won a bronze medal in the K-2 1000 m event at Rome in 1960.

Kapłaniak also won two gold medals at the 1958 ICF Canoe Sprint World Championships in Prague, earning them in the K-1 500 m and K-2 500 m events.
