= František =

František (Czech pronunciation: [ˈfrancɪʃɛk]) is a masculine Czech and Slovak given name. It is a cognate of Francis, Francisco, François and Franz. It can be also surname (feminine: Františková). Notable people with the name include:

== Given name ==
=== Arts ===
- Frank Daniel (František Daniel) (1926–1996), Czech film director, producer and screenwriter
- František Bartoš (folklorist) (1837–1906), Czech ethnomusicologist and folklorist
- František Bělský, known as Franta Belsky (1921–2000), Czech sculptor
- František Bílek (1872–1941), Czech sculptor and architect
- František Brikcius, Czech cellist
- František Brixi (1732–1771), Czech composer
- František Čáp (1913–1972), Czech film director and screenwriter
- František Čelakovský (1799–1852), Czech writer and translator
- František Čermák (painter) (1822–1884), Czech painter
- František Doucha (1810–1884), Czech literary translator and writer
- František Drdla (1868–1944), Czech violinist and composer
- František Drtikol (1883–1961), Czech photographer
- František Xaver Dušek (1731–1799), Czech composer, harpsichordist and pianist
- František Dvořák (painter) (1862–1927), Czech painter
- František Flos (1864–1961), Czech novelist
- František Gellner (1881– c. 1914), Czech poet and writer
- František Griglák (born 1953), Slovak guitarist
- František Halas (1901–1949), Czech poet, essayist and translator
- František Vladislav Hek (1769–1847), Czech writer and composer
- František Hrubín (1910–1971), Czech poet and writer
- František Janák (born 1951), Czech glass artist
- František Kaván (1866–1941), Czech painter and poet
- František Kmoch (1848–1912), Czech composer and orchestra conductor
- Frantisek Kotzwara (1730–1791), Czech violist, double bassist and composer
- František Kupka (1871–1957), Czech painter and graphic artist
- František Langer (1888–1965), Czech playwright, military physician, script writer and essayist
- František Listopad (1921–2017), Czech poet, writer and theatre and television director
- František Václav Míča (1694–1744), Czech composer and orchestra conductor
- František Ondříček (1857–1922), Czech violinist and composer
- František Jakub Prokyš (1713–1791), Czech Rococo painter
- František Skála (born 1956), Czech sculptor, painter, illustrator and musician
- František Škroup (1801–1862), Czech composer and conductor
- František Zdeněk Skuherský (1830–1892), Czech composer, pedagogue and theoretician
- František Sláma (musician) (1923–2004), Czech chamber music cellist
- František Tůma (1704–1774), Czech composer
- František Uprka (1868–1929), Czech sculptor
- František Velecký (1934–2003), Slovak actor
- František Krištof Veselý (1903–1977), Slovak actor and singer
- František Vízner (1936–2011), Czech glass artist
- František Vláčil (1924–1999), Czech film director, painter and graphic artist
- František Ženíšek (1849–1916), Czech painter
- František Zvarík (1921–2008), Slovak actor

=== Sport ===
- František Balvín (1915–2003), Czech cross-country skier
- František Bartoš (motorcyclist) (1926–1987), Czech motorcycle road racer
- František Bočko (1941–2025), Slovak gymnast
- František Bolček (1920–1968), Slovak footballer
- František Brůna (1944–2017), Czech handball player
- František Brzák (1915–2006), Czech canoeist
- František Čapek (1914–2008), Czech sprint canoeist
- František Čermák (born 1976), Czech tennis player
- František Černík (born 1953), Czech ice hockey player
- František Cipro (1947–2023), Czech football player and manager
- František Doležal (1913–?), Czech boxer
- František Donth (fl. 1920s), Czech Nordic skier
- František Douda (1908–1990), Czech shot putter
- František Dřížďal (born 1978), Czech footballer
- František Dvořák (fencer) (1871–1939), Czech fencer
- František Fadrhonc (1914–1981), Czech football manager
- František Getreuer (1906–1945), Czech swimmer and water polo player
- František Häckel (fl. 1920s), Czech cross-country skier
- František Havelka (1908–?), Czech boxer
- František Hoholko (1947–2005), Slovak football player and coach
- František Hrabě (fl. 1950s), Czech slalom canoeist
- František Huf (born 1981), Czech bodybuilder
- František Jakubec (1956–2016), Czech footballer
- František Janda-Suk (1878–1955), Czech athlete
- František Jež (born 1970), Czech ski jumper and Nordic skier
- František Junek (1907–1970), Czech footballer
- František Kaberle Sr. (born 1951), Czech ice hockey player
- František Kaberle (born 1973), Czech ice hockey player
- František Kadaňka (born 1944), Czech slalom canoeist
- František Kloz (1905–1945), Czech footballer
- František Komňacký (born 1951), Czech football manager
- František Králík (1942–1974), Czech handball player
- František Kučera (born 1968), Czech ice hockey player
- František Lanák (20th century), Slovak football manager
- František Laurinec (born 1951), Slovak Football Association president
- František Maka (born 1968), Czech Nordic skier
- František Masarovič (fl. 1930s), Slovak footballer
- František Metelka (born 1980), Czech footballer
- Frank Musil (born František Musil 1964), Czech ice hockey player and coach
- František Nekolný (1907–1990), Czech boxer
- František Pecháček (1896–1944), Czech gymnast
- František Plánička (1904–1996), Czech footballer
- František Pospíšil (born 1944), Czech ice hockey player and coach
- František Procházka (born 1962), Czech ice hockey player
- František Provazník (born 1948), Czech rower
- František Raboň (born 1983), Czech bicycle road racer
- František Rajtoral (born 1986), Czech footballer
- František Říha (born 1935), Czech sprint canoeist
- František Šafránek (1931–1987), Czech footballer
- František Schmucker (1940–2004), Czech footballer
- František Schneider (born 1987), Czech footballer
- František Schubert (1894–1940), Czech chess master
- František Šimůnek (1910–unknown), Czech Nordic skier
- František Sokol (1939–2011), Czech volleyball player
- František Štambachr (born 1953), Czech footballer
- František Šťastný (1927–2000), Czech motorcycle road racer
- František Šterc (1912–1978), Czech footballer
- František Straka (born 1958), Czech football player and manager
- František Šulc (born 1950), Czech handball player
- František Švec, Czechoslovak sprint canoeist
- František Svoboda (1906–1948), Czech footballer
- František Svoboda (canoeist) (1904–1991), Czech canoeist
- František Tikal (1933–2008), Czech ice hockey player
- František Treybal (1882–1947), Czech chess master
- František Vaněček (1891–1945), Czech gymnast
- František Ventura (1894–1969), Czech horse jumper
- František Veselý (1943–2009), Czech footballer
- František Vršovský (1933–2022), Czech sprint canoeist
- František Wende (1904–1968), Czech ski jumper and Nordic skier
- František Zajíšek (1912–1987), Czech bobsledder
- František Zíta (1909–1977), Czech chess master

=== Politics ===
- František Bublan (born 1951), Czech politician and dissident
- František Chvalkovský (1885–1945), Czech diplomat and politician
- František Kašický (born 1968), Slovak politician and government minister
- František Knapík (born 1956), Slovak politician
- František Kriegel (1908–1979), Czechoslovak politician and physician
- František Lipka (born 1946), Slovak diplomat, poet and translator
- František Mareš (1857–1942), Czech philosopher and politician
- František Mikloško (born 1947), Slovak politician
- František Palacký (1798–1876), Czech historian and politician
- František Pitra (1932–2018), Czech politician; Prime Minister of the Czech Republic 1988–1990
- František Ladislav Rieger (1818–1903), Czech politician and publicist
- František Šebej (born 1947), Slovak politician and academic
- František Sláma (politician) (1850–1917), Czech writer, traveller, lawyer and politician
- František Udržal (1866–1938), Czech politician; Prime Minister of Czechoslovakia 1929–1932

=== Other ===
- František Běhounek (1898–1973), Czech scientist, explorer and writer
- František Chvostek (1835–1884), Moravian physician
- František Dvorník (1893–1975), Czech historian
- František Fajtl (1912–2006), Czech fighter pilot
- František Fuka (born 1968), Czech computer programmer and musician
- František Lydie Gahura (1891–1958), Czech architect and sculptor
- František Josef Gerstner (1756–1832), Bohemian physicist and engineer
- František Graus (1921–1989), Czech historian of medieval Europe
- František Janeček (1878–1941), Czech engineer and entrepreneur
- František Jílek (1913–1993), Czech orchestra conductor
- František Klácel (1808–1882), Moravian Augustinian author, philosopher and scientist
- František Koláček (1851–1913), Czech physicist
- František Křižík (1847–1941), Czech inventor, electrical engineer and entrepreneur
- František Lexa (1876–1960), Czech Egyptologist
- František Lorenz (1872–1957), Czech polyglot, philosopher and Esperantist
- František Maxmilián Kaňka (1674–1766), Czech architect
- František Moravec (1895–1966), Czechoslovak military intelligence officer before and during World War II
- František Mrázek (1958–2006), Czech entrepreneur and mobster; assassinated
- František Neuwirt (1895–1957), Czech professor of stomatology
- František Antonín Nickerl (1813–1871), Czech entomologist
- František Nušl (1867–1951), Czech astronomer and mathematician
- František Patočka (1904–1985), Czech microbiologist, serologist and virologist
- František Peřina (1911–2006), Czech fighter pilot
- František Rábek (born 1949), Slovak Catholic prelate
- František Rint (fl. 19th century), Czech woodcarver, carpenter and sculptor of bones
- František Roubík (1890–1974), Czech historian and archivist
- František Šmahel (1934–2025), Czech historian
- František Šorm (1913–1980), Czech chemist
- František Josef Studnička (1836–1903), Czech mathematician and university professor
- František Sušil (1804–1868), Moravian Roman Catholic priest and collector of traditional Moravian folk music
- František Švantner (1912–1950), Slovak writer
- František Tomášek (1899–1992), Czech cardinal of the Roman Catholic Church in Bohemia
- František Vymazal (1841–1917), Czech polyglot and language textbook writer
- František Vyskočil (born 1941), Czech neuroscientist and physiologist
- František Záviška (1879–1945), Czech physicist

== Surname ==
- Josef František (1914–1940), Czech fighter pilot
