= Chyšná =

- Municipality
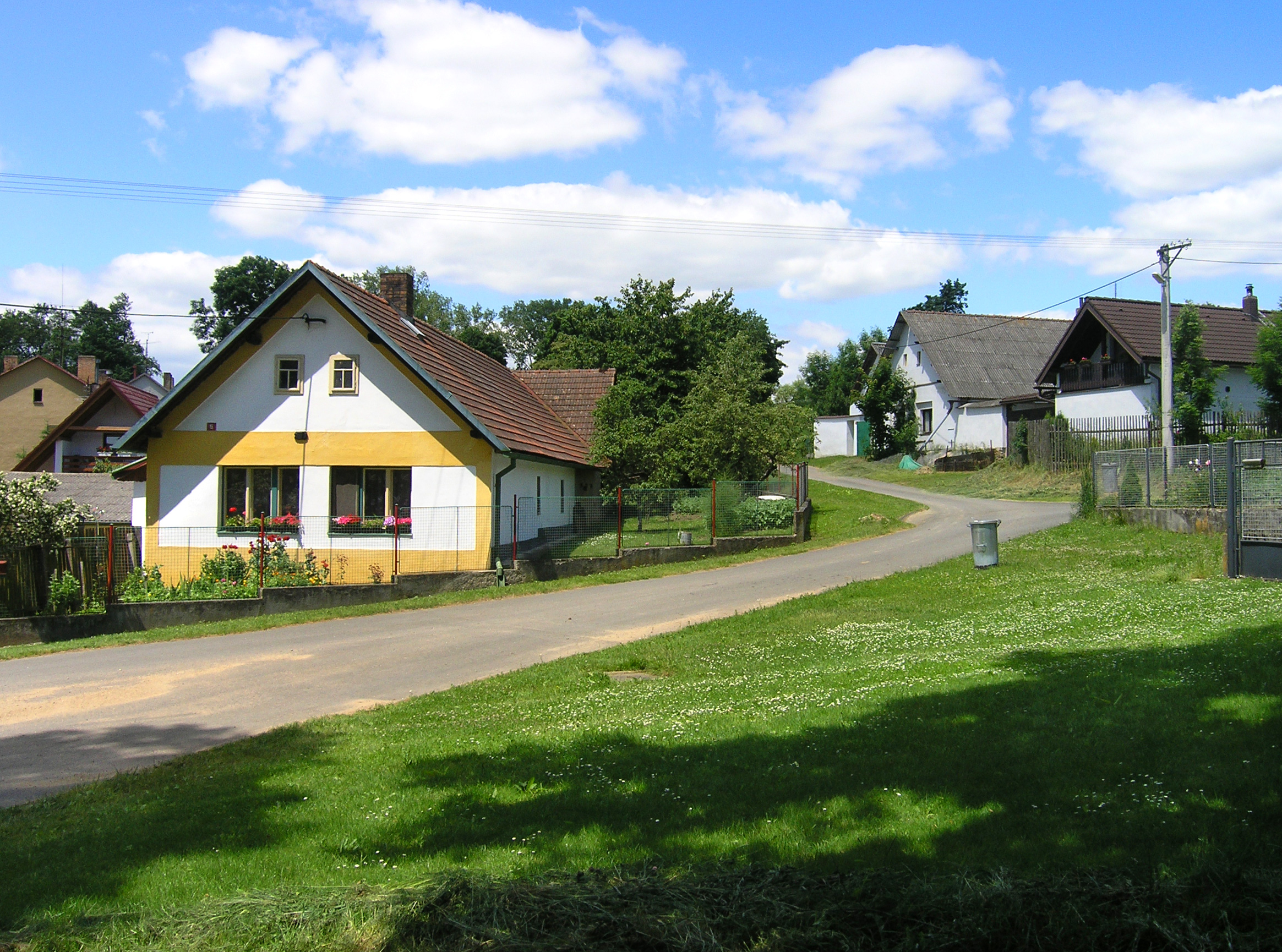
- Centre of Chyšná

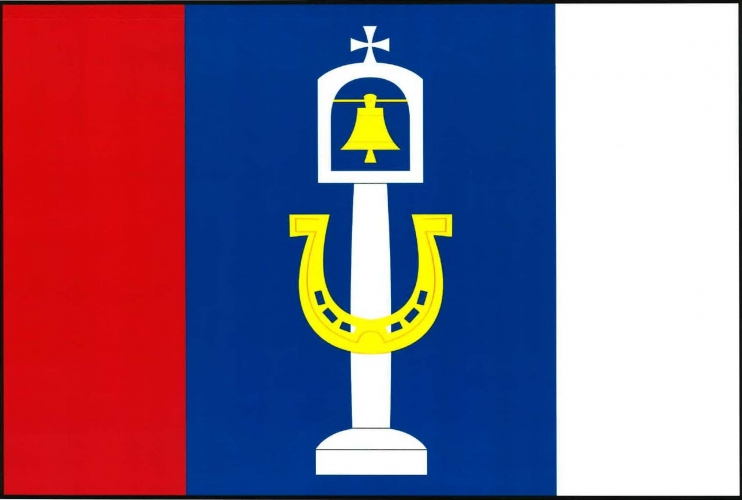
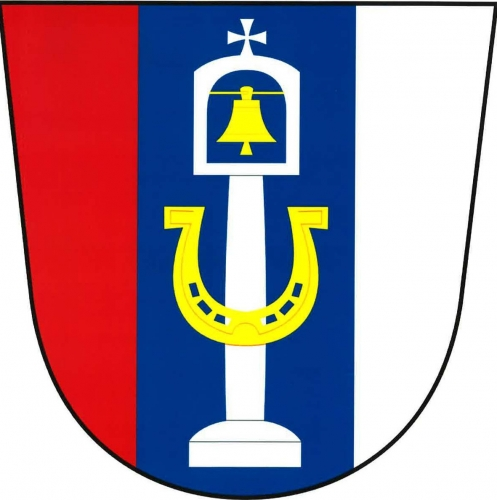
- Flag Coat of arms

- Location in the Czech Republic
- Coordinates: 49°35′11″N 15°6′0″E
- Country: Czech Republic
- Region: Vysočina
- District: Pelhřimov
- First mentioned: 1305

Area
  - Total: 2.83 km^{2} (1.09 sq mi)
- Elevation: 485 m (1,591 ft)

Population (2026-01-01)
  - Total: 124
  - Density: 43.8/km^{2} (113/sq mi)
- Time zone: UTC+1 (CET)
  - Summer (DST): UTC+2 (CEST)
- Postal code: 395 01
- Website: chysna.unas.cz

Chyšná is a municipality and village in Pelhřimov District in the Vysočina Region of the Czech Republic. It has about 100 inhabitants.

Chyšná lies approximately 20 kilometres (12 mi) north-west of Pelhřimov, 42 km (26 mi) north-west of Jihlava, and 74 km (46 mi) south-east of Prague.

== Demographics ==
Historical population
Year	Pop.	±%
1869	209	—
1880	222	+6.2%
1890	227	+2.3%
1900	246	+8.4%
1910	202	−17.9%
1921	199	−1.5%
1930	190	−4.5%
1950	141	−25.8%
1961	144	+2.1%
1970	139	−3.5%
1980	136	−2.2%
1991	105	−22.8%
2001	102	−2.9%
2011	93	−8.8%
2021	87	−6.5%
Source: Censuses
