= Vyklantice =

- Municipality
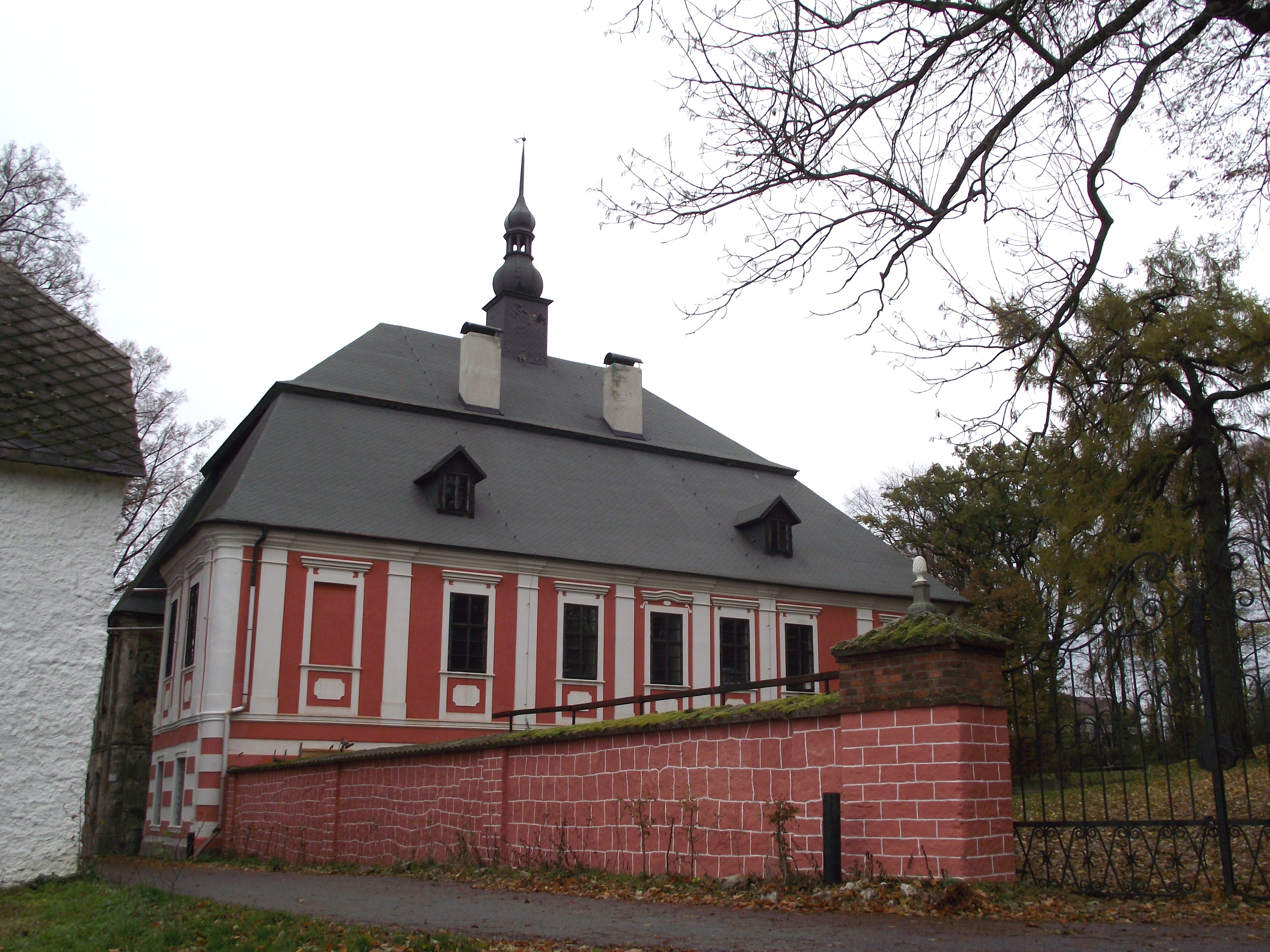
- Vyklantice Castle

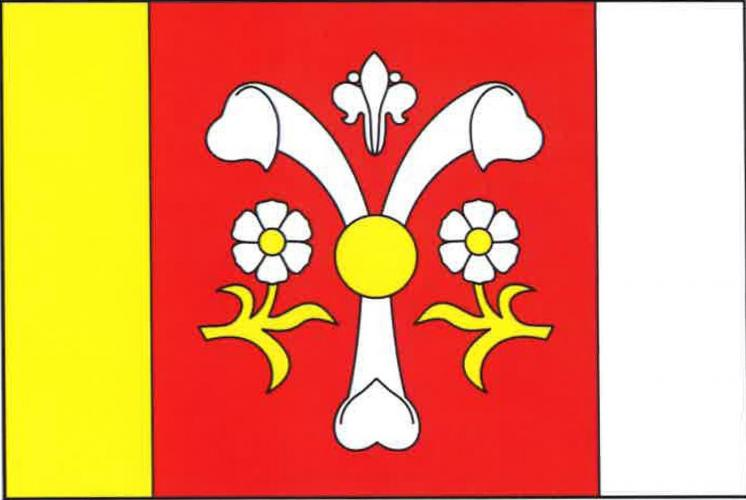
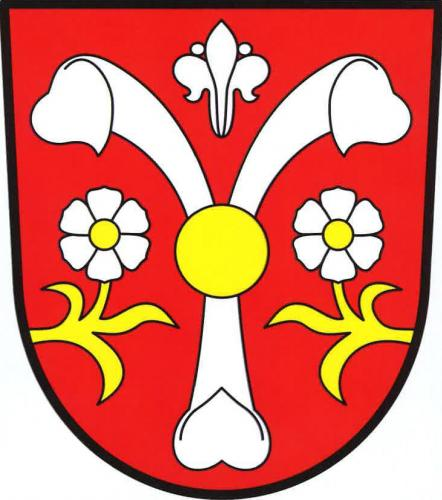
- Flag Coat of arms

- Location in the Czech Republic
- Coordinates: 49°33′16″N 15°2′26″E
- Country: Czech Republic
- Region: Vysočina
- District: Pelhřimov
- First mentioned: 1410

Area
  - Total: 6.81 km^{2} (2.63 sq mi)
- Elevation: 602 m (1,975 ft)

Population (2026-01-01)
  - Total: 142
  - Density: 20.9/km^{2} (54.0/sq mi)
- Time zone: UTC+1 (CET)
  - Summer (DST): UTC+2 (CEST)
- Postal codes: 394 27, 395 01
- Website: www.vyklantice.cz

Vyklantice is a municipality in Pelhřimov District in the Vysočina Region of the Czech Republic. It has about 100 inhabitants.

Vyklantice lies approximately 20 kilometres (12 mi) north-west of Pelhřimov, 44 km (27 mi) north-west of Jihlava, and 74 km (46 mi) south-east of Prague.

== Administrative division ==
Vyklantice consists of six municipal parts (in brackets population according to the 2021 census):

- Staré Vyklantice (76)
- Nové Vyklantice (13)
- Kateřinky (16)
- Nový Smrdov (11)
- Petrovsko (7)
- Starý Smrdov (17)

== Demographics ==
Historical population
Year	Pop.	±%
1869	826	—
1880	772	−6.5%
1890	723	−6.3%
1900	735	+1.7%
1910	662	−9.9%
1921	670	+1.2%
1930	597	−10.9%
1950	433	−27.5%
1961	469	+8.3%
1970	380	−19.0%
1980	296	−22.1%
1991	225	−24.0%
2001	186	−17.3%
2011	163	−12.4%
2021	140	−14.1%
Source: Censuses
