= Bořetín (Pelhřimov District) =

- Municipality
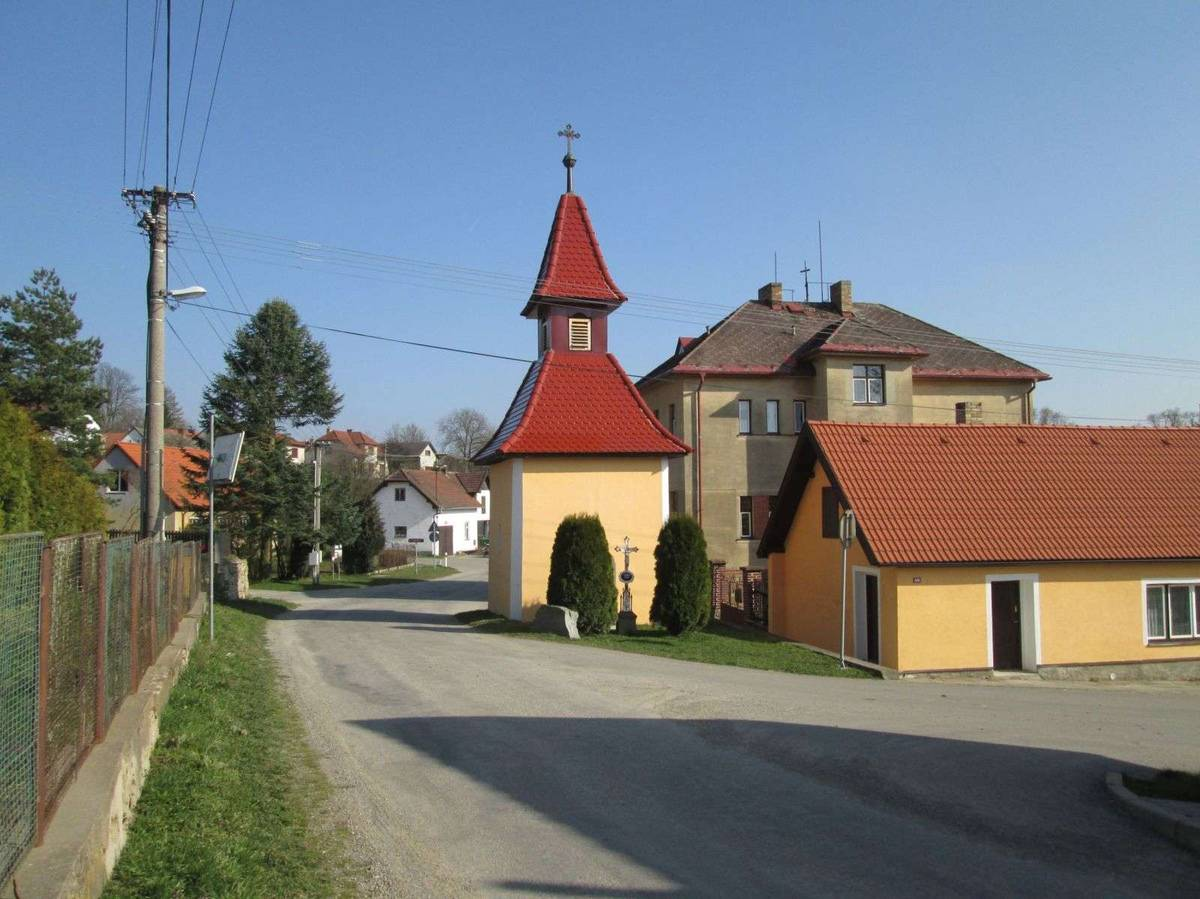
- Chapel in the centre of Bořetín

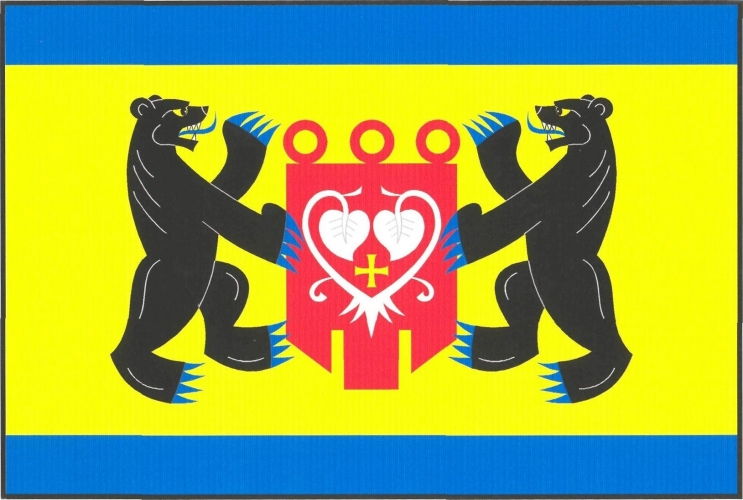
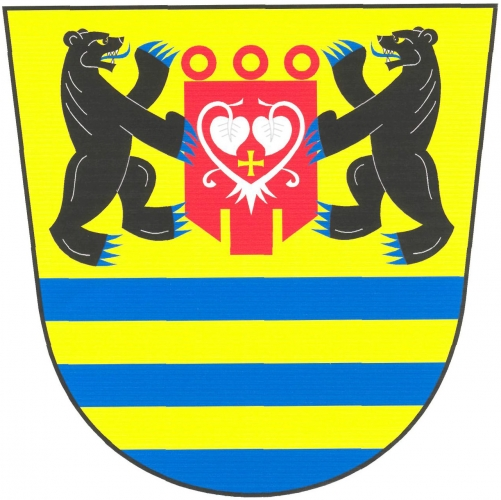
- Flag Coat of arms

- Location in the Czech Republic
- Coordinates: 49°18′37″N 14°56′52″E
- Country: Czech Republic
- Region: Vysočina
- District: Pelhřimov
- First mentioned: 1549

Area
  - Total: 4.81 km^{2} (1.86 sq mi)
- Elevation: 576 m (1,890 ft)

Population (2026-01-01)
  - Total: 112
  - Density: 23.3/km^{2} (60.3/sq mi)
- Time zone: UTC+1 (CET)
  - Summer (DST): UTC+2 (CEST)
- Postal code: 394 70
- Website: www.boretin.cz

Bořetín is a municipality and village in Pelhřimov District in the Vysočina Region of the Czech Republic. It has about 100 inhabitants.

Bořetín lies approximately 24 kilometres (15 mi) south-west of Pelhřimov, 48 km (30 mi) west of Jihlava, and 94 km (58 mi) south-east of Prague.

== Demographics ==
Historical population
Year	Pop.	±%
1869	399	—
1880	361	−9.5%
1890	387	+7.2%
1900	388	+0.3%
1910	379	−2.3%
1921	389	+2.6%
1930	329	−15.4%
1950	237	−28.0%
1961	204	−13.9%
1970	171	−16.2%
1980	148	−13.5%
1991	127	−14.2%
2001	106	−16.5%
2011	101	−4.7%
2021	102	+1.0%
Source: Censuses
