= Libkova Voda =

- Municipality
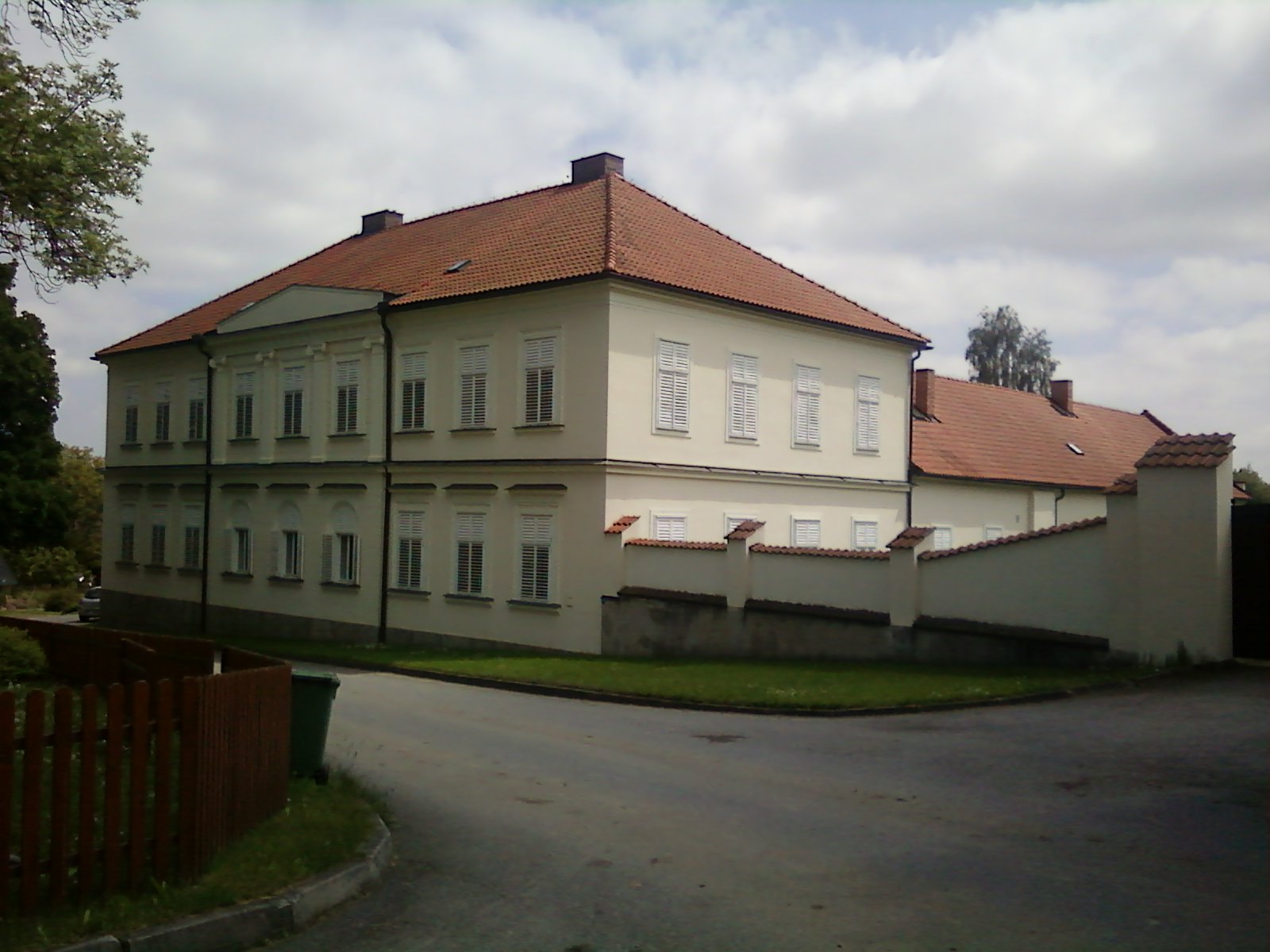
- Libkova Voda Castle

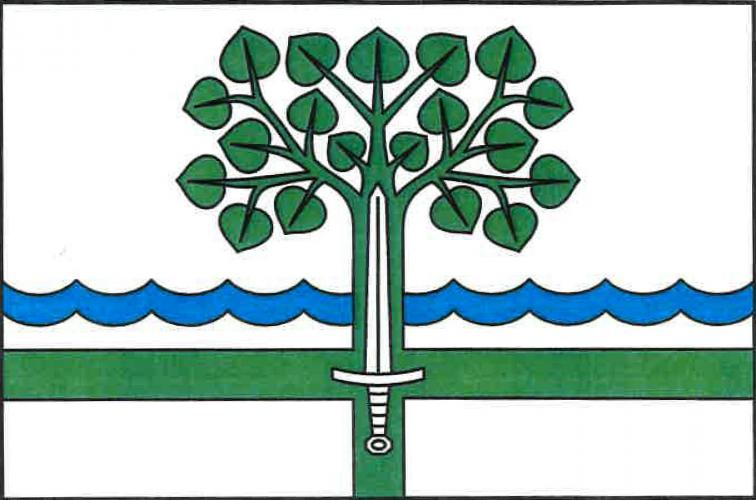
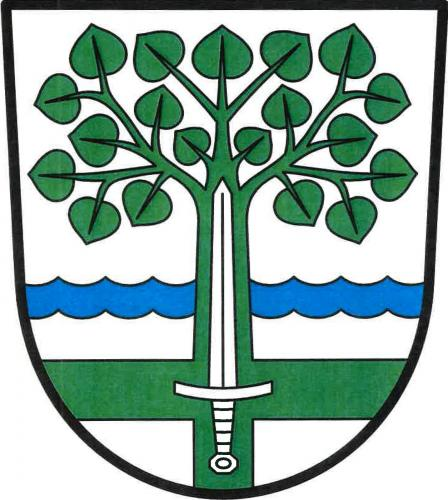
- Flag Coat of arms

- Location in the Czech Republic
- Coordinates: 49°22′36″N 15°11′58″E
- Country: Czech Republic
- Region: Vysočina
- District: Pelhřimov
- First mentioned: 1352

Area
  - Total: 7.41 km^{2} (2.86 sq mi)
- Elevation: 598 m (1,962 ft)

Population (2026-01-01)
  - Total: 271
  - Density: 36.6/km^{2} (94.7/sq mi)
- Time zone: UTC+1 (CET)
  - Summer (DST): UTC+2 (CEST)
- Postal code: 394 62
- Website: www.libkova-voda.cz

Libkova Voda (German: Libekswasser) is a municipality and village in Pelhřimov District in the Vysočina Region of the Czech Republic. It has about 300 inhabitants.

Libkova Voda lies approximately 7 kilometres (4 mi) south of Pelhřimov, 29 km (18 mi) west of Jihlava, and 97 km (60 mi) south-east of Prague.

== Demographics ==
Historical population
Year	Pop.	±%
1869	459	—
1880	456	−0.7%
1890	509	+11.6%
1900	491	−3.5%
1910	467	−4.9%
1921	440	−5.8%
1930	388	−11.8%
1950	304	−21.6%
1961	304	+0.0%
1970	261	−14.1%
1980	226	−13.4%
1991	187	−17.3%
2001	188	+0.5%
2011	223	+18.6%
2021	258	+15.7%
Source: Censuses
