= Roubík =

Roubík (Czech feminine: Roubíková) is a Czech surname. Notable people with the surname include:

- František Roubík (1890–1974), Czech historian
- Václav Roubík (1919–2013), Czech rower

== See also ==
- Roubíček, a related surname
