= Dehtáře =

- Municipality
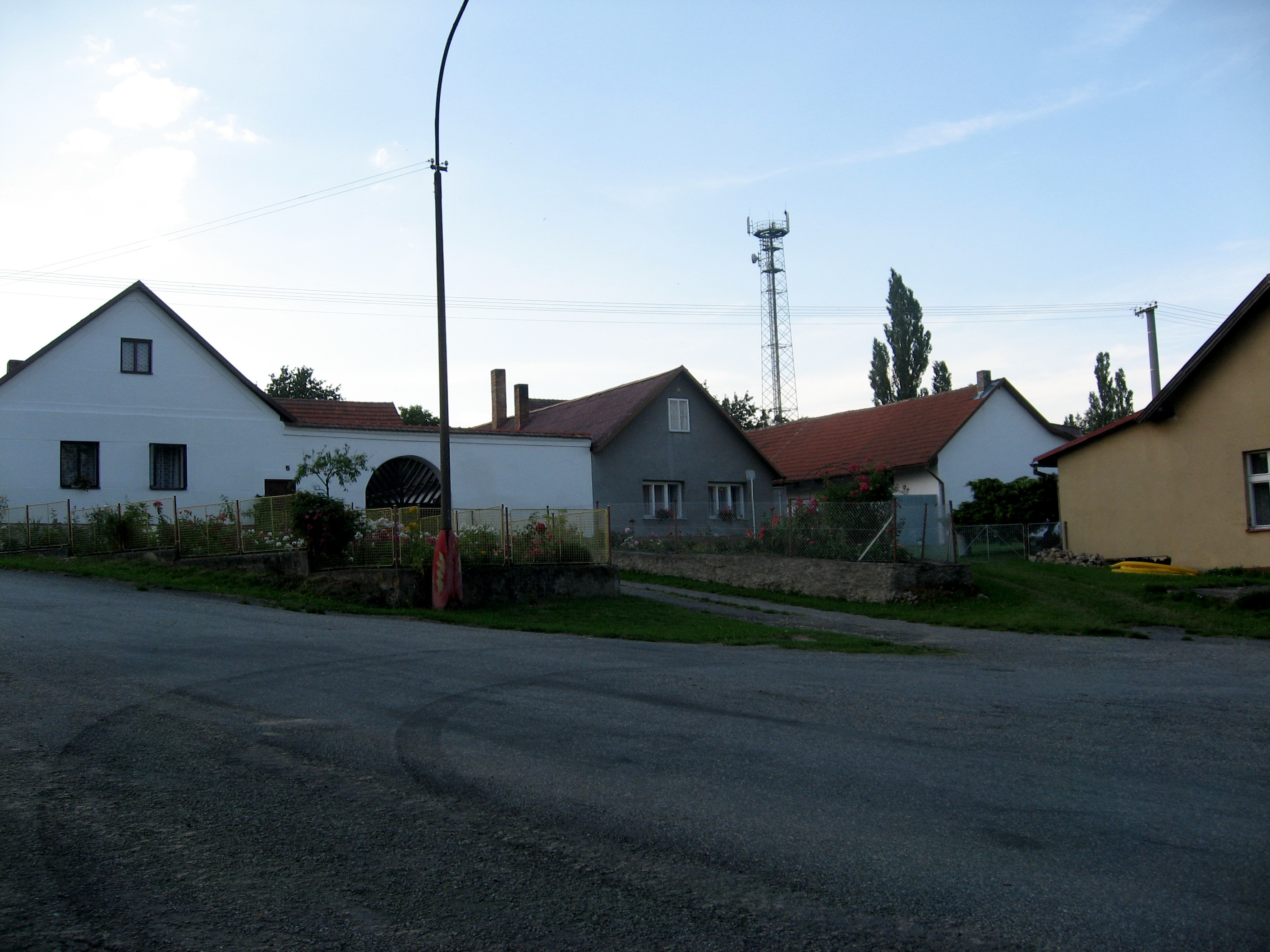
- Houses in Dehtáře

- Location in the Czech Republic
- Coordinates: 49°29′10″N 15°16′31″E
- Country: Czech Republic
- Region: Vysočina
- District: Pelhřimov
- First mentioned: 1379

Area
  - Total: 7.95 km^{2} (3.07 sq mi)
- Elevation: 524 m (1,719 ft)

Population (2026-01-01)
  - Total: 123
  - Density: 15.5/km^{2} (40.1/sq mi)
- Time zone: UTC+1 (CET)
  - Summer (DST): UTC+2 (CEST)
- Postal code: 393 01
- Website: www.obec-dehtare.cz

Dehtáře is a municipality and village in Pelhřimov District in the Vysočina Region of the Czech Republic. It has about 100 inhabitants.

Dehtáře lies approximately 7 kilometres (4 mi) north-east of Pelhřimov, 25 km (16 mi) north-west of Jihlava, and 91 km (57 mi) south-east of Prague.

== Administrative division ==
Dehtáře consists of four municipal parts (in brackets population according to the 2021 census):

- Dehtáře (33)
- Milotice (19)
- Onšovice (44)
- Vadčice (20)

== Demographics ==
Historical population
Year	Pop.	±%
1869	449	—
1880	433	−3.6%
1890	377	−12.9%
1900	360	−4.5%
1910	358	−0.6%
1921	352	−1.7%
1930	301	−14.5%
1950	198	−34.2%
1961	211	+6.6%
1970	184	−12.8%
1980	135	−26.6%
1991	116	−14.1%
2001	101	−12.9%
2011	124	+22.8%
2021	116	−6.5%
Source: Censuses
