= Vojtěch Benedikt Juhn =

Czech painter (1779–1843)

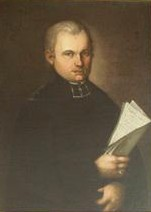
Portrait of Juhn, first half of the 19th century, Červený Kameň Castle

Vojtěch Benedikt Juhn (21 March 1779 – 27 November 1843, Jindřichův Hradec) was a Czech painter and engraver.

== Life ==
Juhn was born on 21 March 1779 in Pelhřimov where his father was a tailor. During his studies he decided to study theology. He served as rector of the seminary. His theological career ended as Jindřichův Hradec provost.

In art he became famous because of his popular engravings of city views – vedutas. Juhn captured the character of local cities such as České Budějovice, Jindřichův Hradec, Pacov, Počátky, Prachatice, Kamenice nad Lipou, Písek, Tábor, and Vodňany.

He collaborated with leading engravers George Karl Dobler and Postle, who was the first Czech classical landscape painter and printmaker. Juhn's works are often found at the top of the various guilds' diplomas, certificates for journeyman apprenticeship certificates and similar publications. Many of his sketchbooks, paintings and engravings over time have been lost.

Juhn died in Jindřichův Hradec on 27 November 1843, and was buried at the cemetery at the former Church of the Holy Trinity.
