= Poutník Brewery =

Czech brewery

Pivovar Poutník
- Poutník Brewery
- Location: Pelhřimov, Czech Republic
- Coordinates: 49°25′50.2″N 15°13′13.08″E
- Opened: 1899
- Annual production volume: 50,000 hectolitres (43,000 US bbl)
- Owned by: DUP Pelhřimov
- Website: pivovarpoutnik.cz/en/

Poutník Brewery (Czech: Pivovar Poutník) is a brewery in Pelhřimov, Czech Republic.

== History ==
The town of Pelhřimov was granted brewing rights in 1552. At first the beer was brewed in various town houses. In the 17th century the burghers decided to establish a communal brewery. The brewery was moved multiple times to different locations due to insufficient space.

In 1899 the current brewery building complex was built at the Na hradišti location. It was designed for lager brewing and was equipped by modern technologies of the era. In 1948 the brewery was nationalized and directed by n. p. Jihočeské pivovary. The company was bought by DUP Pelhřimov in 2001 and the name of the brewery was changed to Poutník.

== Beers ==
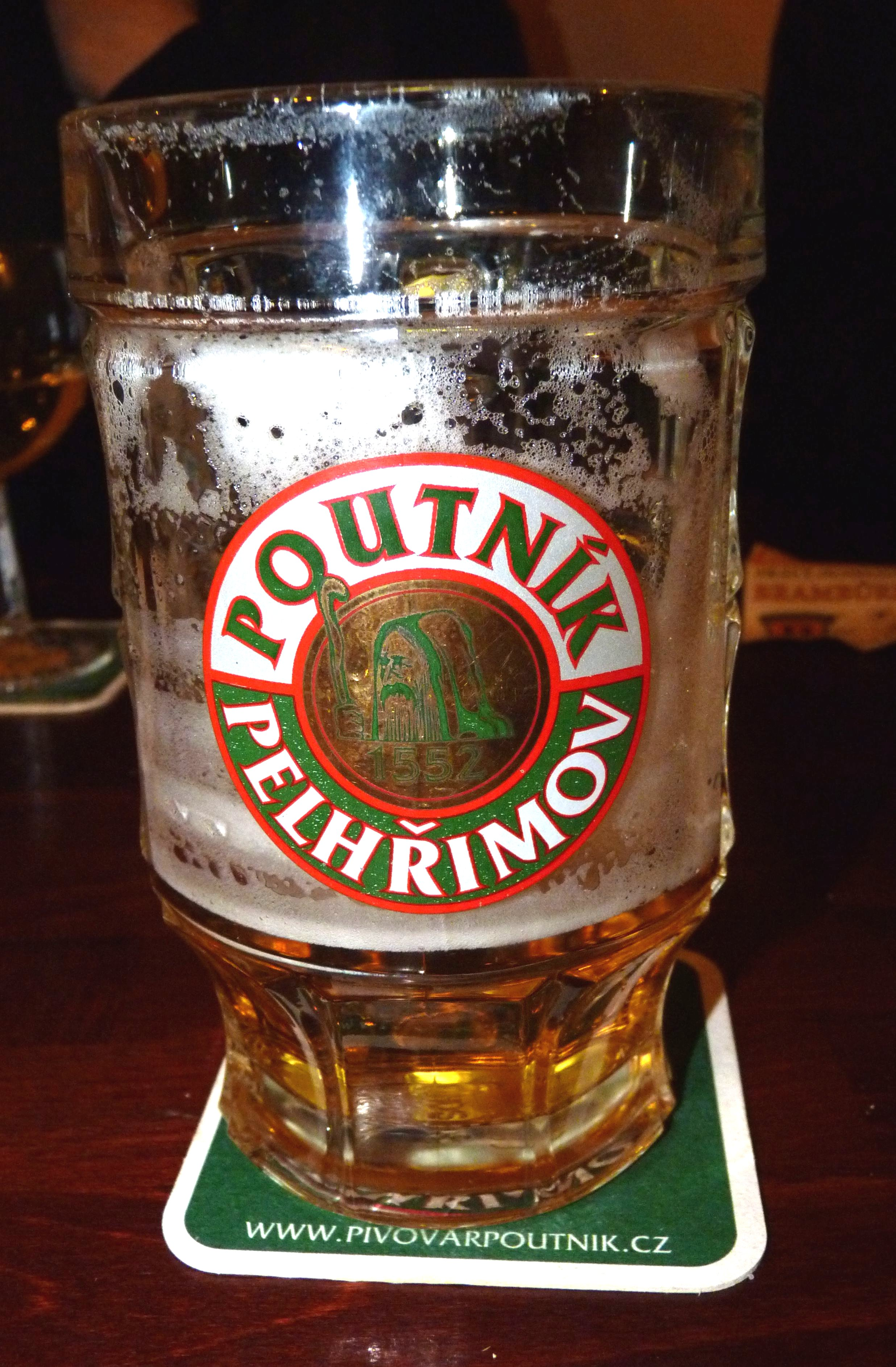
A mug of Poutník beer

- Poutník 10° (4.0% abv) pale lager
- Poutník 11° (4.5% abv) pale lager
- Poutník 12° (5.0% abv) pale lager
- Poutník 12° Hořký (5.0% abv) pale lager with extra hops
- Poutník 14° (5.8% abv) strong pale lager, sold only during Christmas and Easter times
