= Roubíček =

Roubíček (Czech feminine: Roubíčková) is a Czech surname. Notable people with this surname include:

- George Roubicek (born 1935), Austrian actor
- Dr. Bruno Roubicek (born 1963), English/Austrian actor - Son of George Roubicek
- Sasha Roubicek (born 1966), English/Austrian dancer - Daughter of George Roubicek
- Iveta Roubíčková (born 1967), Czech biathlete
- Václav Roubíček (born 1967), Czech tennis player
- Katja Roubicek aka Katja Macabre (born 1998), English/Austrian singer- Daughter of Sasha Roubicek

== See also ==
- Roubík, a related surname
