= František Huf =

Czech bodybuilder and model (born 1981)

- Professional bodybuilder
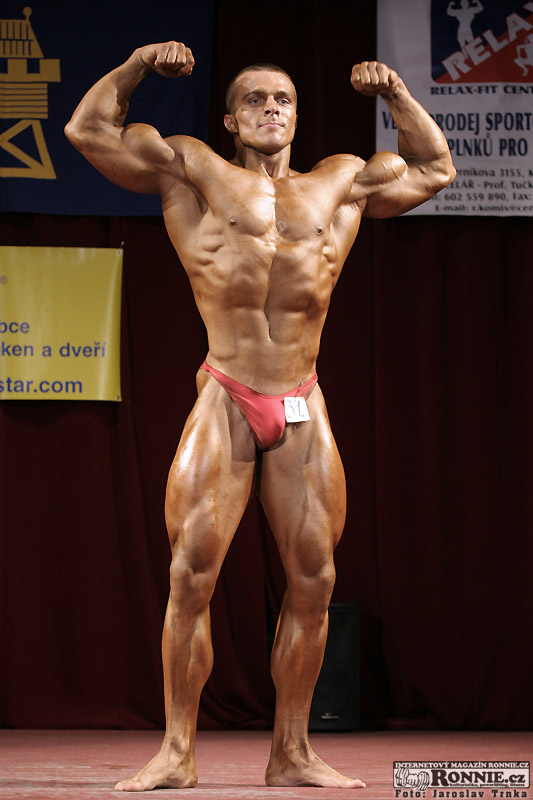

Personal info
- Born: 1981 (age 44–45); Olomouc, Czechoslovakia

Best statistics
- Height: 174 cm (5 ft 9 in)
- Weight: 92 kg (203 lb)

František Huf (born 1981 in Olomouc, Czechoslovakia) is a Czech bodybuilder and model.

He is 174 centimetres (5 ft 9 in) tall, and usually competes in the "Classic Bodybuilder" weight class. He weighs 107 kilograms (236 lb) in the off-season. He won the Grand Prix Fitness Nutrend in 2005. He is Lukáš Osladil's protégé.

== Private life ==
He married in 2006, and the couple had a son named Samuel František in 2008. He worked in the gay porn industry in the early 2000s.

== Awards ==
- 1997 - 1st Mr. Czech Republic younger adolescents in Hronov
- 1998 - 1st Mr. Moravy and Silesian adolescents in Zbýšov
- 1998 - 1st Mr. Czech Republic adolescents in Zlín
- 1999 - 1st Mr. Moravy and Silesian adolescents in Zbýšov
- 1999 - 1st Mr. Czech Republic in Čelákovice
- 1999 - 1st Mr. Czech Republic junior in Zbýšov
- 1999 - 4th Mr. The International Cup Competition for Men in Slovensko
- 2001 - 1st Mr. World Jr., in Španělsko in Alicante
- 2002 - 1st Mr. Junior Czech Republic in Jaroměř
- 2003 - Transfer between male categories
- 2005 - 1st Mr. + The Absolute Winner of the Grand Prix Nutrend
- 2007 - 3rd Mr. European Championship in Baku in Azerbaijan
- 2007 - 1st Mr. Grand Prix Vyškov
- 2007 - 1st Mr. Grand Prix Opava
- 2007 - 1st Mr. Prague Cup + Absolute winner
- 2007 - 3rd Mr. World Championship in Barcelona
