= František Jakub Prokyš =

Bohemian Rococo painter

František Jakub Prokyš (1713–1791) was a Bohemian Rococo painter.
