= František Záviška =

Czechslovak physicist (1879–1945)

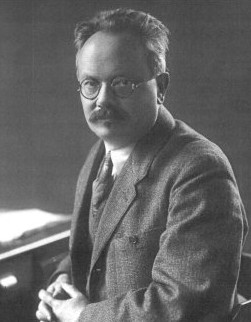
František Záviška

František Záviška (November 18, 1879 – April 17, 1945) was a Czechslovak physicist. The major asset of his scientific work is integrated in nine studies on waveguides published between the years 1912 and 1939. They evaluated, on the basis of the Maxwell equations, the effect of radiation by electromagnetic waves in space using conductible and non-conductible cylinders, tubes and their combinations, organized in different ways. The results of Záviška's experiments were groundbreaking, but they were published in Czech journals only and never became known abroad.

In January 1944, the Nazi Gestapo arrested him on suspicion of resistance activities. He was imprisoned first in Prague and Brno, and later in the concentration camps of Mauthausen and Osterode^{(de)}. He died April 17, 1945, as a result of exhaustion during a death march from the concentration camp.
