= František Vyskočil =

Czech neuroscientist (born 1941)

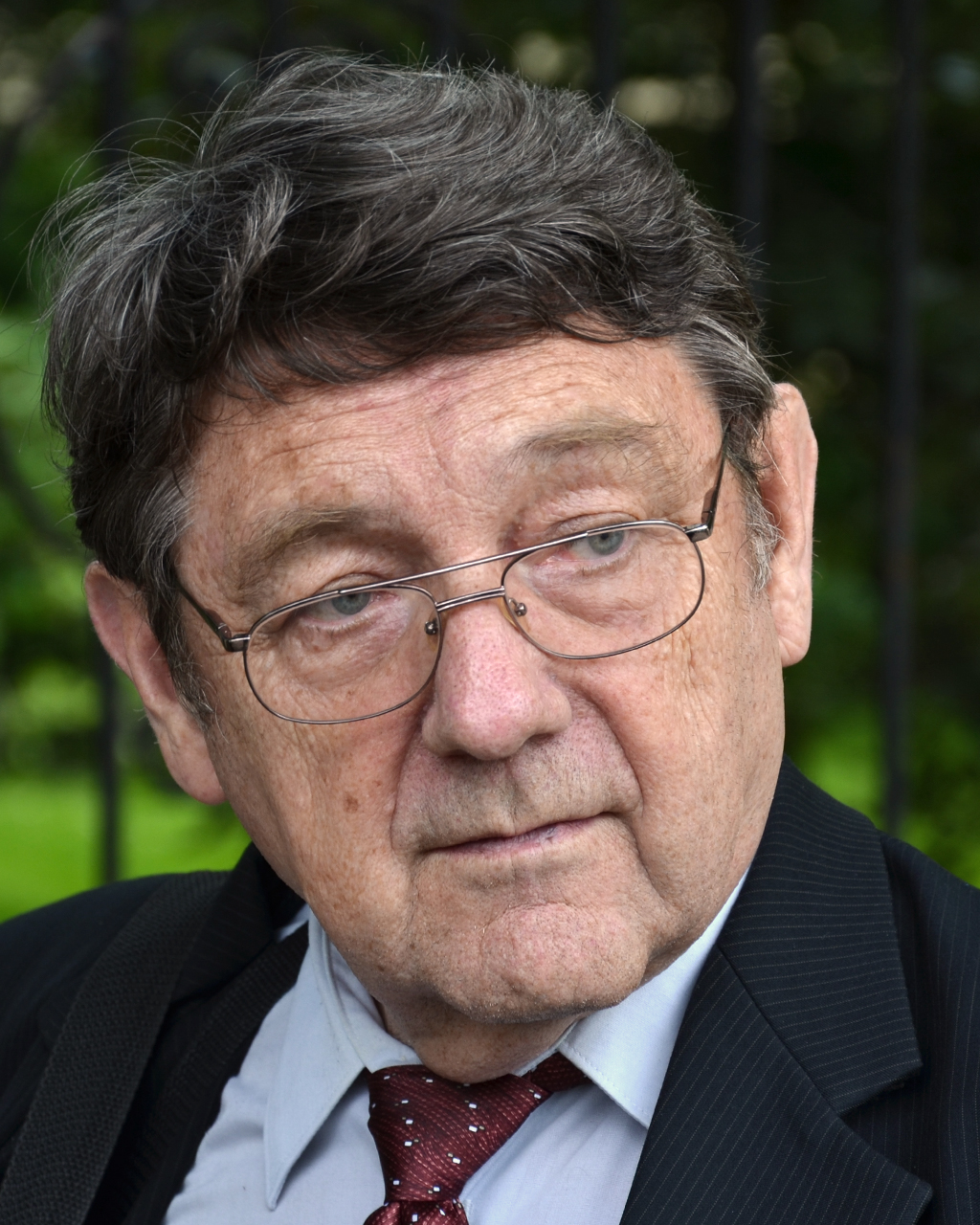
- Vyskočil in 2016
- Born: September 3, 1941 (age 85); Pelhřimov, Protectorate of Bohemia and Moravia
- Education: Charles University (RNDr); Institute of Physiology, Czechoslovak Academy of Sciences (DSc)
- Known for: Non-quantal synaptic release of neurotransmitters
- Spouse: Emilia
- Children: 2
- Awards: Josef Hlávka Medal, Purkynje Medal (Czech Academy of Sciences, 2011), Silver Medal of the Chairman (Senate of the Czech Republic, 2014), Medal (Learned Society of the Czech Republic, 2019), Silver Medal (Charles University, 2022)
- Scientific career
- Fields: Neuroscience, physiology, neurophysiology
- Workplaces: Charles University, Czech Academy of Sciences, Kazan State Medical University, University of California, San Francisco

František Vyskočil (born September 3, 1941) is a Czech neuroscientist and a professor of physiology and neurophysiology at Charles University. He is best known for his contributions in the field of non-quantal synaptic release of neurotransmitters.

== Biography ==
He graduated from the Faculty of Science of Charles University in Prague and the Institute of Physiology, Czechoslovak Academy of Sciences. Vyskočil later divided his professional life between the Department of Physiology at the university and the Institute of Physiology of the Czech Academy of Sciences. He also worked as a Visiting Professor at the Department of Physiology, University of California, San Francisco.

Professor Vyskočil is a laureate of several prizes, most prominently the Purkynje Medal of the Czech Academy of Sciences and a Silver Medal of the Chairman of the Senate. He is a founding member of The Learned Society of the Czech Republic.

František Vyskočil, DSc, received a silver commemorative medal for his significant lifetime work in the field of physiology and his long-standing scientific and pedagogical activities at Charles University in Prague.

Vyskočil was an atheist and later became convinced of the existence of a creator god and converted to Jehovah's Witnesses.

He is also an avid violin player.
