= František Metelka =

Czech footballer

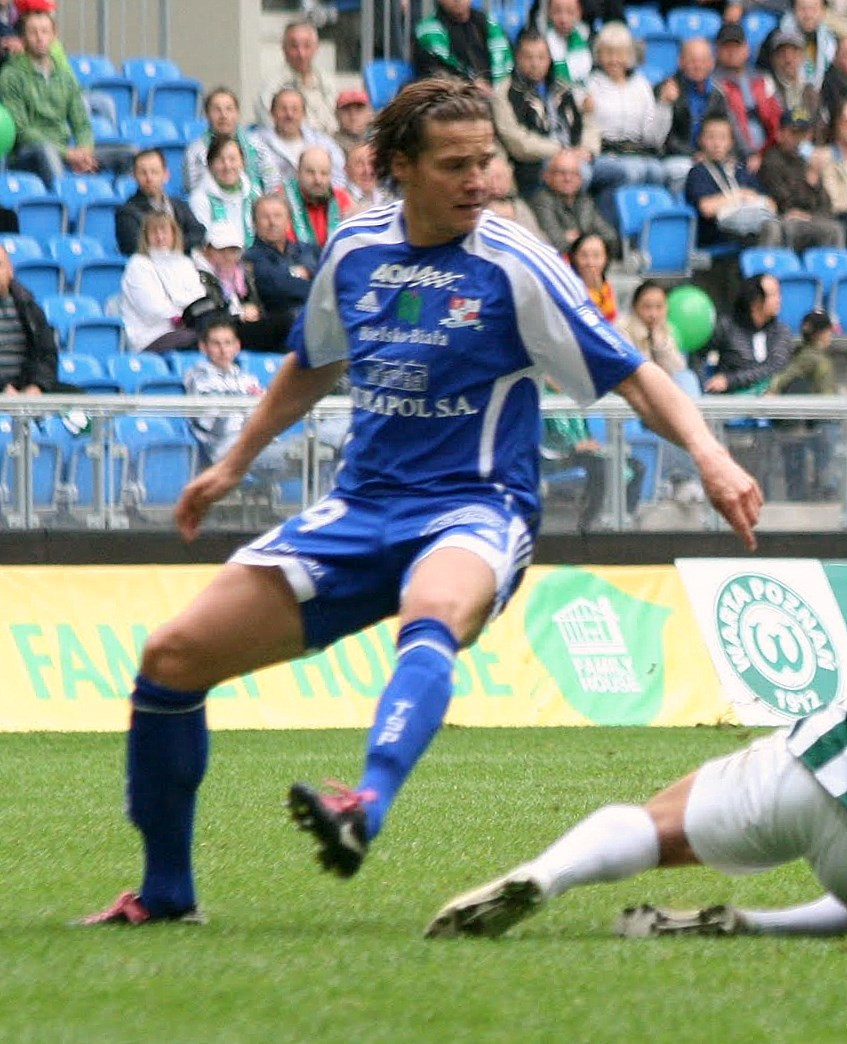

Personal information
- Date of birth: 8 April 1980 (age 46)
- Place of birth: Vítkov, Czechoslovakia
- Height: 1.86 m (6 ft 1 in)
- Position: Midfielder

Youth career
- 1987–1998: SFC Opava

Senior career*
Years	Team	Apps	(Gls)
1998–2003	SFC Opava	120	(6)
2000	→ Vítkovice (loan)	14	(1)
2004–2009	Baník Ostrava	83	(7)
2008	→ SFC Opava (loan)	9	(0)
2010	Rudar Velenje	28	(0)
2011–2012	Podbeskidzie Bielsko-Biała	20	(0)
2012	Baník Ostrava	0	(0)
2012	→ Baník Sokolov (loan)	10	(2)
2012–2017	Opava	82	(10)
2016	→ Vítkovice (loan)	12	(1)
- * Club domestic league appearances and goals

František Metelka (born 8 April 1980) is a Czech former professional footballer who played as a midfielder.

== Career ==
Metelka played for Silesian clubs SFC Opava and Baník Ostrava before moving to Slovenia to play for Rudar Velenje. He won the Czech Cup with Baník in 2005.

In February 2011, he joined Podbeskidzie Bielsko-Biała on a one-year contract.

In July 2016 he returned to Opava as a playing assistant manager for Opava's reserve team.

== Honours ==
Baník Ostrava

- Czech Cup: 2004–05
