= František Lanák =

Slovak football manager

František Lanák was a Slovak football manager. He coached ŠK Slovan Bratislava.
