= František Neuwirt =

Czech stomatologist

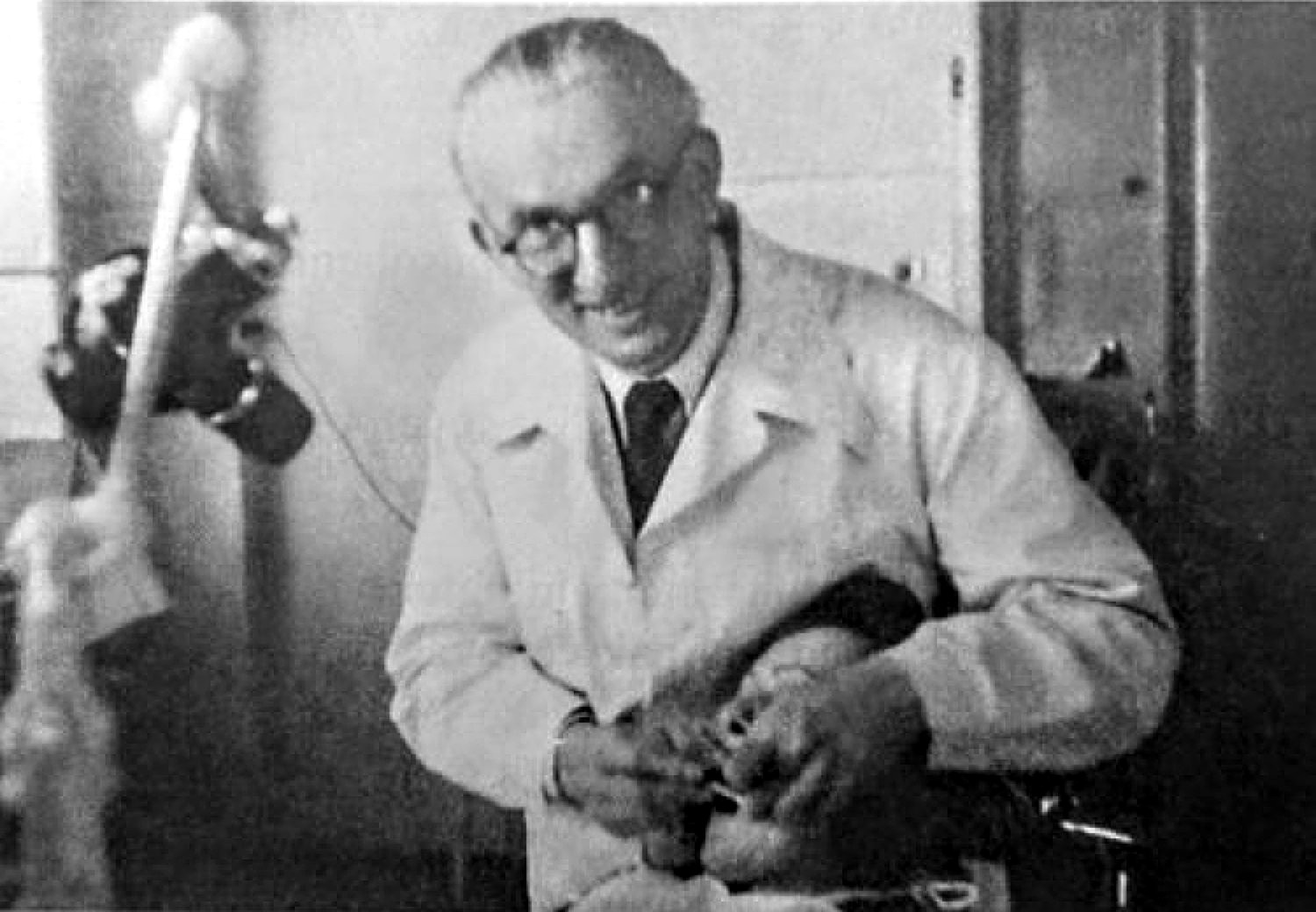
- Neuwirt in 1950
- Born: 26 August 1895; Malenovice, Austria-Hungary
- Died: 15 August 1957 (aged 61); Dobřív, Czechoslovakia
- Occupation: Stomatologist

František Neuwirt (26 August 1895 – 15 August 1957), was a Czech stomatologist. He was a member of the Czechoslovak Academy of Sciences.

== Biography ==
Neuwirt was born on 26 August 1895 in Malenovice (today an integral part of Zlín).

He followed Jan Jesenský as head of the Prague Stomatology Clinic until his death. He was a member of the Bohemian Academy, a member of International Association for Dental Research (IADR), whose Honorary Vice-President he became in 1939–1940, and co-founder of its Prague Section in 1932.

He had a daughter, Hana, a historian at the Charles University and a son, Jan, a hematologist and researcher at Charles University.

His sister Rosalie was the wife of Vladimír Jiří Rott, Prague entrepreneur. František Neuwirt had his private general practice at their premises on Malé náměstí and was one of the frequent guests at their "Thursdays", where Prague and international society met.

He died on 15 August 1957 in Dobřív.

== Literature ==
- Neuwirt, František (1948). Jan Jesenský. Prague: nakladatelství České akademie věd a umění.
