= František Schneider =

Czech footballer

Personal information
- Date of birth: 21 April 1987 (age 39)
- Place of birth: Czechoslovakia
- Height: 1.85 m (6 ft 1 in)
- Position: Midfielder

Senior career*
Years	Team	Apps	(Gls)
2006–2010	1. FC Brno	8	(0)
2008	→ FC Vysočina Jihlava (loan)	28	(4)
2009	→ 1. FK Příbram (loan)	5	(0)
2010	1. SC Znojmo	8	(0)
2011	Birżebbuġa St. Peter's	10	(1)
2014	MFK Zvolen	14	(1)
- * Club domestic league appearances and goals

František Schneider (born 21 April 1987) is a Czech former football player. He played in the Czech First League for 1. FC Brno and 1. FK Příbram.
