= František Masarovič =

Slovak footballer

František Masarovič was a former Slovak football player. In the 1930s, he played for FC Spartak Trnava and ŠK Slovan Bratislava.
