= František Roubík =

Czech archivist and historian (1890–1974

- Born: 31 July 1890
- Died: 5 May 1974 (aged 83)
- Occupation: historian
- Known for: archivist for aristocratic family Czernin

František Roubík (31 July 1890 – 5 May 1974) was an eminent Czech historian. He was an archivist for aristocratic family Czernin.
