= Pelhřimov =

- Town
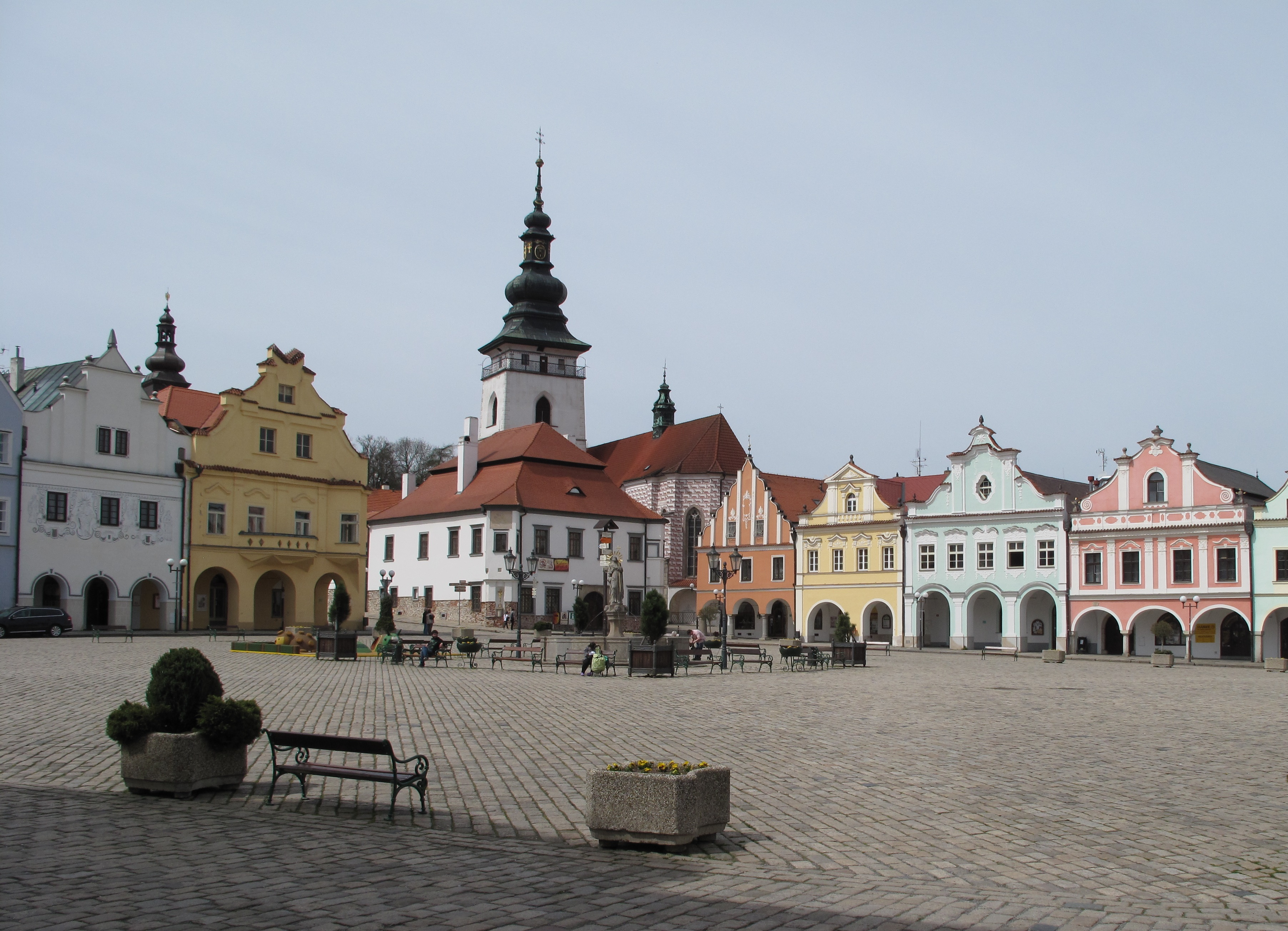
- The square Masarykovo náměstí

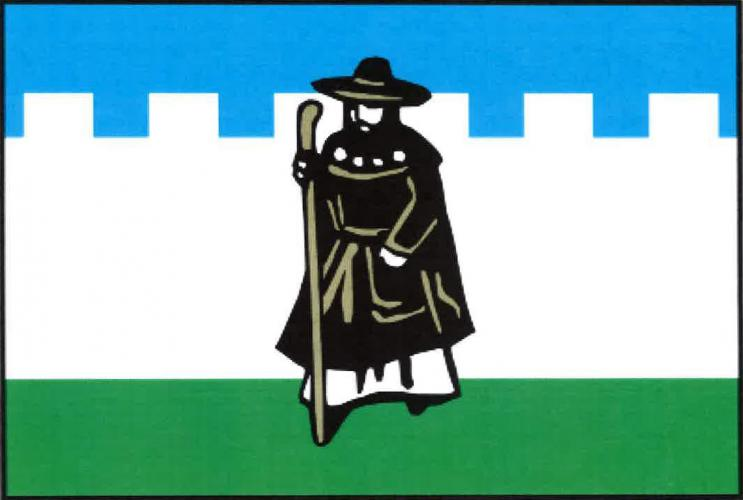
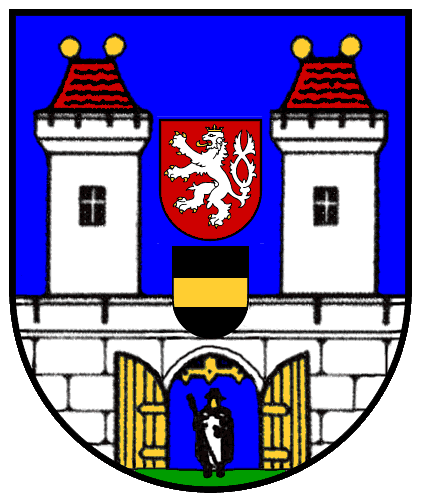
- Flag Coat of arms

- Location in the Czech Republic
- Coordinates: 49°25′53″N 15°13′24″E
- Country: Czech Republic
- Region: Vysočina
- District: Pelhřimov
- First mentioned: 1289

Government
  - Mayor: Ladislav Med (ODS)

Area
  - Total: 95.28 km^{2} (36.79 sq mi)
- Elevation: 494 m (1,621 ft)

Population (2026-01-01)
  - Total: 16,233
  - Density: 170.4/km^{2} (441.3/sq mi)
- Time zone: UTC+1 (CET)
  - Summer (DST): UTC+2 (CEST)
- Postal code: 393 01
- Website: www.mestopelhrimov.cz

Pelhřimov (Czech pronunciation: [ˈpɛlɦr̝ɪmof]; German: Pilgram) is a town in the Vysočina Region of the Czech Republic. It has about 16,000 inhabitants. The town is located in the Křemešník Highlands, in the valley of the Bělá Stream. It is a regional industrial centre.

The historic town centre with valuable Baroque and Renaissance houses is well preserved and is protected as an urban monument reservation. Among the main landmarks of Pelhřimov is the Church of Saint Bartholomew

Pelhřimov is home to the Dobrý den Agency, which maintains the database of Czech records and curiosities. The town is home to the Museum of Records and Curiosities Pelhřimov and the main cultural event in the town is the annual International Festival of Records and Curiosities.

== Administrative division ==
Pelhřimov consists of 27 municipal parts (in brackets population according to the 2021 census):

- Pelhřimov (13,695)
- Benátky (25)
- Bitětice (29)
- Čakovice (49)
- Chvojnov (69)
- Hodějovice (62)
- Houserovka (52)
- Janovice (69)
- Jelcovy Lhotky (16)
- Kocourovy Lhotky (6)
- Lešov (71)
- Lipice (56)
- Myslotín (143)
- Nemojov (59)
- Ostrovec (11)
- Pejškov (37)
- Pobistrýce (17)
- Radětín (51)
- Radňov (71)
- Rybníček (26)
- Skrýšov (181)
- Služátky (74)
- Starý Pelhřimov (328)
- Strměchy (170)
- Útěchovičky (60)
- Vlásenice (104)
- Vlásenice-Drbohlavy (46)

Benátky, Houserovka, Janovice and Ostrovec, Lešov, Nemojov and Radňov, and Vlásenice-Drbohlavy form three exclaves of the municipal territory.

== Etymology ==
The name Pelhřimov is derived from the personal name Pelhřim (in Latin Peregrinus), meaning "Pelhřim's (court)". In Latin, the word peregrinus literally means 'stranger'. According to legend, Pelhřimov was founded by Bishop Pelhřim (Peregrinus) of Vartenberk around 1225.

== Geography ==
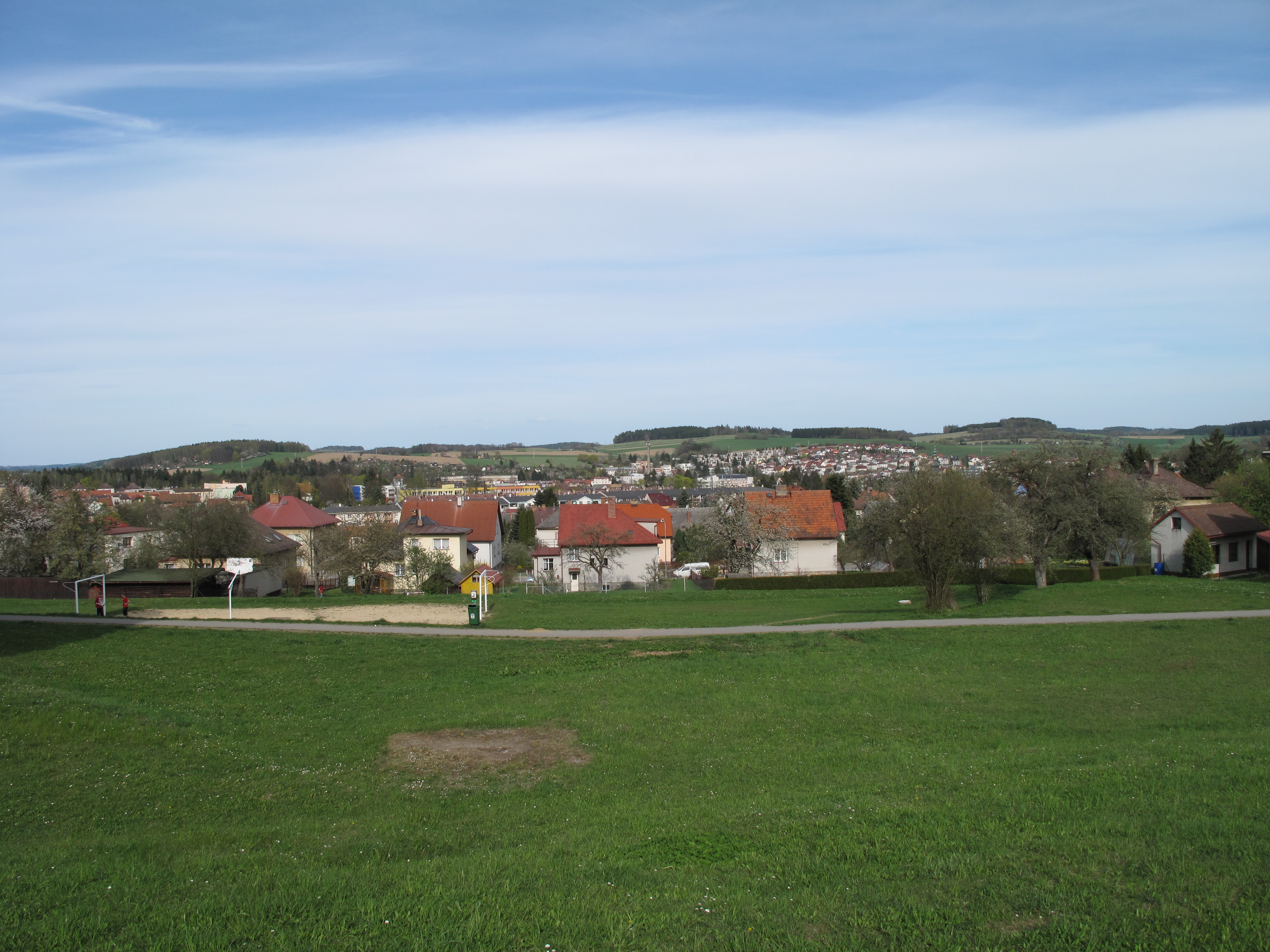
General view

Pelhřimov's municipal territory of about 95 km^{2} (37 sq mi) is one of the largest for a town in the Czech Republic. The town is located about 37 kilometres (23 mi) west of Jihlava, approximately halfway between Prague and Brno.

Pelhřimov lies in the Křemešník Highlands. The highest point of the municipal territory is a contour line in the southeastern part, at 700 m (2,297 ft) above sea level. The municipal territory is located in the valley of the Bělá Stream, which flows through the built-up area. Typical for the territory is a large number of small fishponds.

== History ==
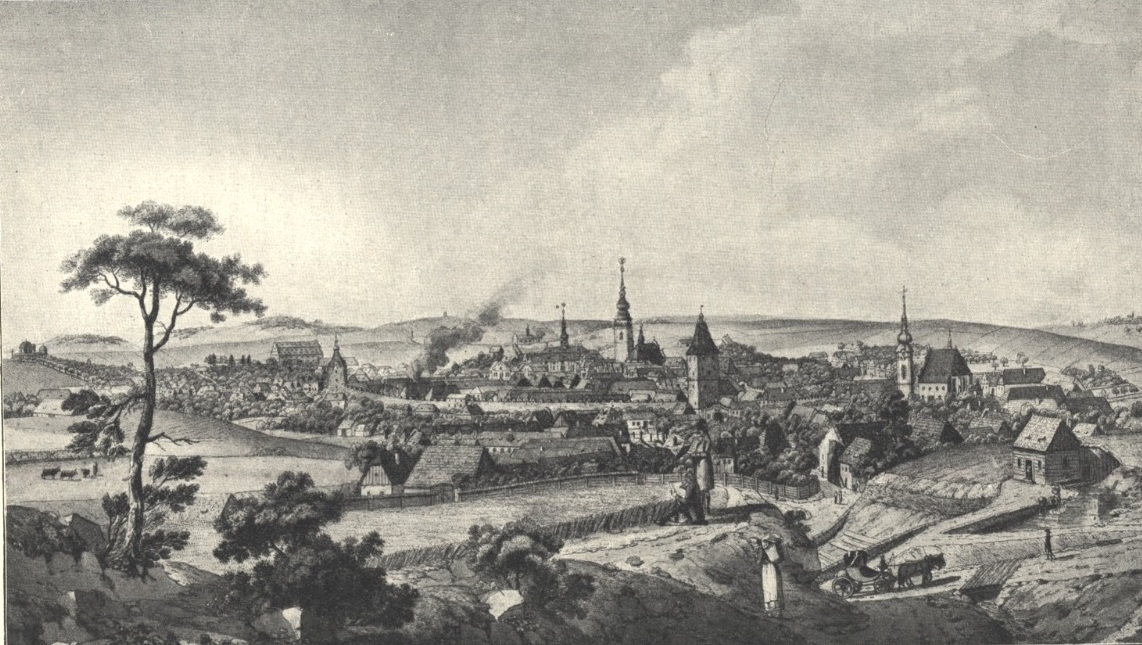
Painting of Pelhřimov by Vojtěch Benedikt Juhn from the first half of the 19th century

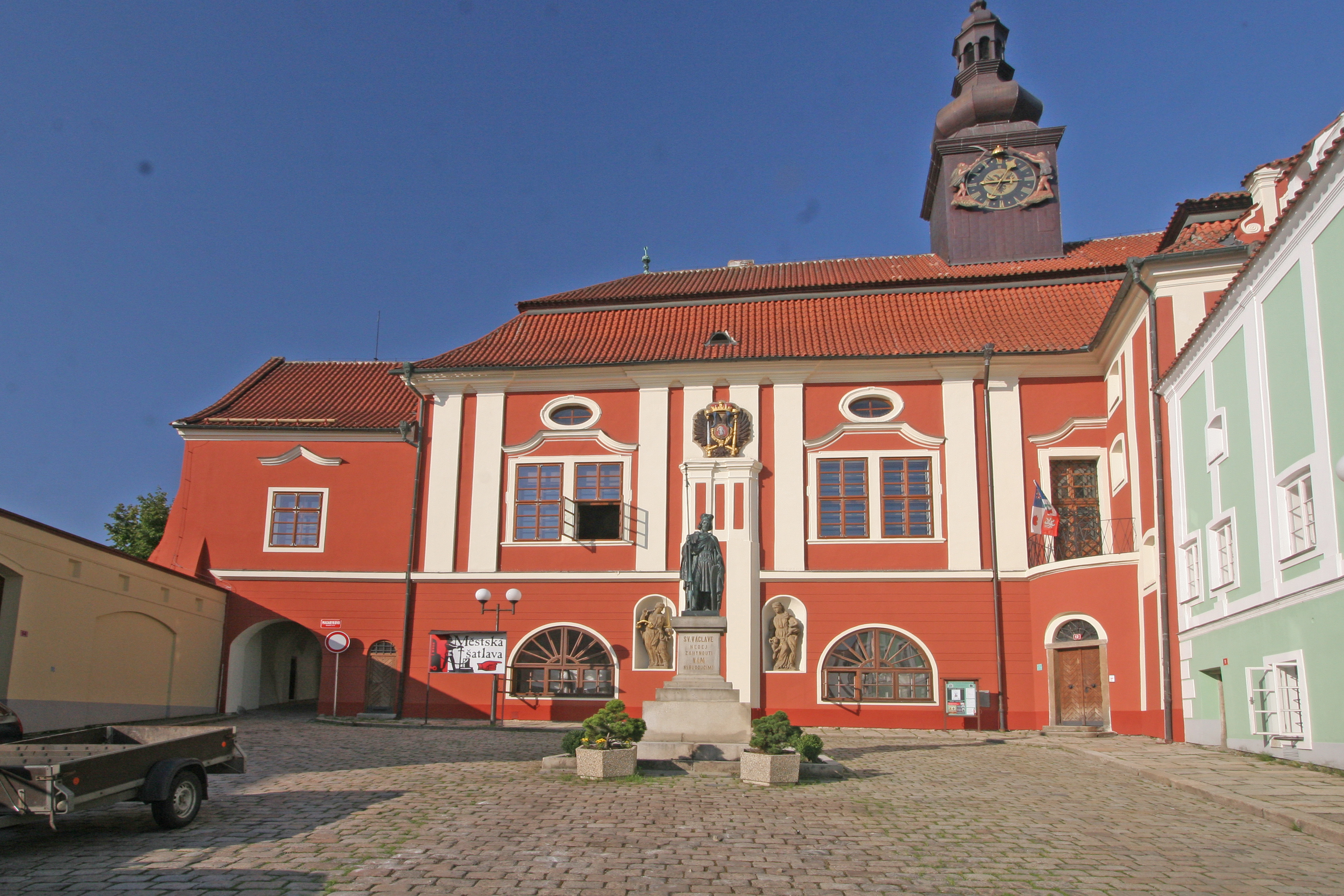
Pelhřimov Castle

The earliest settlement was probably founded in first half of the 13th century near the Church of Saint Vitus. The first written mention of Pelhřimov is from 1289, when it was raided by Vítek of Hluboká. In 1290, King Wenceslaus II granted Bishop Tobiáš of Bechyně a concession to renovate the town and fortify it. The town was first settled mainly by German colonists. Gradually Czechs established themselves as the majority.

In the Hussite Wars, Pelhřimov sided with the Hussites. The favourable position of the town, on the borderline of the domain of the Rosenberg family and of the Lords of Kunštát, was important after the upheavals ended and the reconciliation of the lords began. In 1446–1450, Pelhřimov was chosen as the venue of land diets (parliaments or deliberative councils), which were attended by King George of Poděbrady. Silver mining in the vicinity of Křemešník helped the expansion of Pelhřimov. The crafts flourished in the town. In 1434, the town was acquired by the Lords Trčka of Lípa. They sold the estate in 1550 to Adam Říčanský of Říčany, who had built a castle adjacent to the town walls. The Lords of Říčany resided in the castle until 1572, when the town bought its freedom.

In 1596, Emperor Rudolf II promoted Pelhřimov to a royal town. The repressions that followed the Bohemian Revolt interrupted the promising expansion of the town. The town was then severely damaged by a large fire in 1646, which destroyed most of the town's buildings. Another devastating fire ravaged the town in 1766. The burgher houses were uniformly reconstructed in the Renaissance-Baroque style and so the fires helped the town to maintain its homogeneity.

During the 19th century, the town has experienced cultural development as a result of the Czech National Revival. Patriotic associations, theatre and singing ensembles were founded. The salt house from 1707 was reconstructed as the National House and is today the Pelhřimov Theatre. In the second half of the 19th century, the industrialisation occurred. It was represented especially by brush-making, hosiery and the production of agricultural implements.

A neo-Gothic synagogue was built in 1890 in Růžová street according to the design by the architect Max Fleischer. The synagogue was demolished in 1967.

== Demographics ==
Historical population

| Year | Pop. | ±% |
|---|---|---|
| 1869 | 8,387 | — |
| 1880 | 8,689 | +3.6% |
| 1890 | 8,738 | +0.6% |
| 1900 | 8,894 | +1.8% |
| 1910 | 9,938 | +11.7% |

| Year | Pop. | ±% |
|---|---|---|
| 1921 | 10,079 | +1.4% |
| 1930 | 10,259 | +1.8% |
| 1950 | 9,198 | −10.3% |
| 1961 | 9,754 | +6.0% |
| 1970 | 11,559 | +18.5% |

| Year | Pop. | ±% |
|---|---|---|
| 1980 | 14,239 | +23.2% |
| 1991 | 16,480 | +15.7% |
| 2001 | 16,590 | +0.7% |
| 2011 | 16,232 | −2.2% |
| 2021 | 15,577 | −4.0% |

Source: Censuses

== Economy ==
Pelhřimov is a regional industrial centre, represented especially by the food industry, engineering and consumer goods manufacture.

The largest local company is Agrostroj, which manufactures agricultural machinery. It was founded in 1896 and employs more than 1,500 people. Other manufacturing companies based in the town are Spojené kartáčovny (SPOKAR), a major producer of brushes; Rimowa, a manufacturer of luggages; a branch of Koh-i-Noor Hardtmuth, a company that makes art supplies and office equipment; and FIA ProTeam, a manufacturer of painting tools.

The food industry mainly processes crops produced in the region. Škrobárny Pelhřimov is a potato starch factory that was founded in 1871. A local branch of the dairy company Madeta has been producing boxed milk in Pelhřimov since 1942. Adélka, a bakery founded in 1990, is producing baked goods and flour and employs almost 300 people. ZZN Pelhřimov, a part of the Agrofert conglomerate, produces fodder for farm animals and employs more than 250 people. The Poutník Brewery has been brewing beer in the town since 1552.

== Transport ==
Pelhřimov lies at the intersection of two primary roads: the I/19, which connects Pelhřimov with Plzeň, and the I/34 from České Budějovice to Svitavy.

Pelhřimov is located on the Jihlava–Tábor railway line. There are two railway stations: Pelhřimov and Vlásenice.

== Culture ==
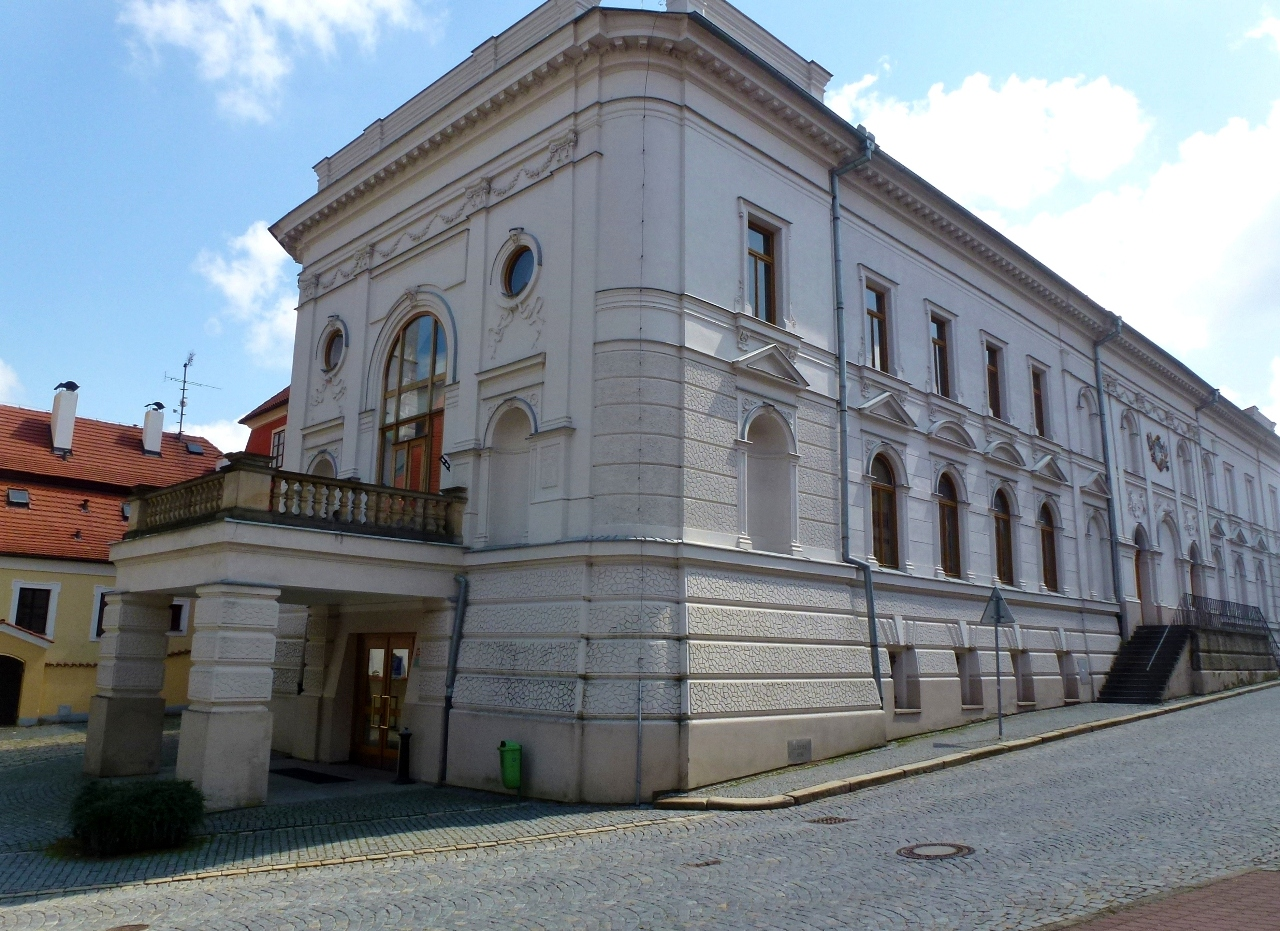
Municipal Theatre

During the National Revival, various patriotic associations were formed in Pelhřimov and managed to maintain their continuity to this day. Záboj, a local choir company, was founded in 1862. In 1865, a local branch of Sokol gymnastic organisation was established. The library was founded in 1846 and the Rieger amateur theatre group was formed in 1894.

The Vesmír Cinema was built in 1962.

Since 1991, the town hosts an annual International Festival of Records and Curiosities. The Dobrý den Agency, which organises the festival, also maintains the Czech Database of Records and publishes Czech Book of Records, a national equivalent of Guinness World Records. The agency operates the Museum of Records and Curiosities Pelhřimov and the Golden Czech Hands exposition.

== Sport ==
The local football club FK Maraton Pelhřimov plays in the fifth-tier football league. Ice hockey club, HC Lední Medvědi Pelhřimov, plays in the fourth-tier ice hockey league. Floorball club Spartak Pelhřimov plays in the third-tier floorball league.

The sports complex in Nádražní street includes a football stadium with an athletic track, an ice hockey stadium, indoor sports halls and swimming pools. Both indoor and outdoor tennis courts are located in the town park Městské sady. Indoor and outdoor beach volleyball facilities are located in Táborská street.

== Education ==
There are five primary schools in the town. The secondary schools are: a gymnasium with a business academy, a vocational school and secondary school of the hotel management, and a secondary technical school with a secondary vocational school.

== Sights ==
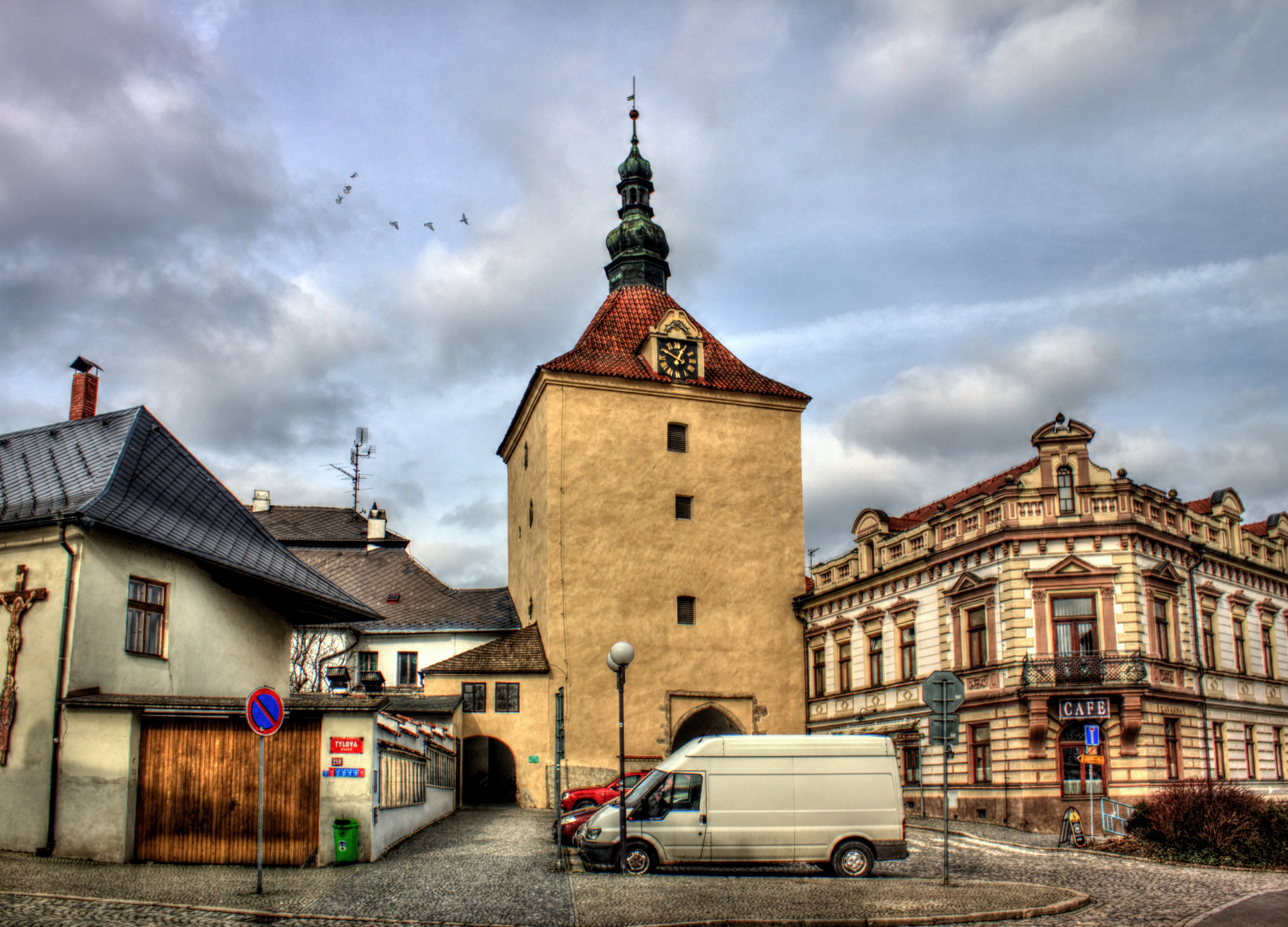
Rynárec Gate

The historic town centre is formed by the square Masarykovo náměstí with adjacent streets. It was surrounded by stone walls. Parts of the walls survived to this day.

=== Masarykovo náměstí ===
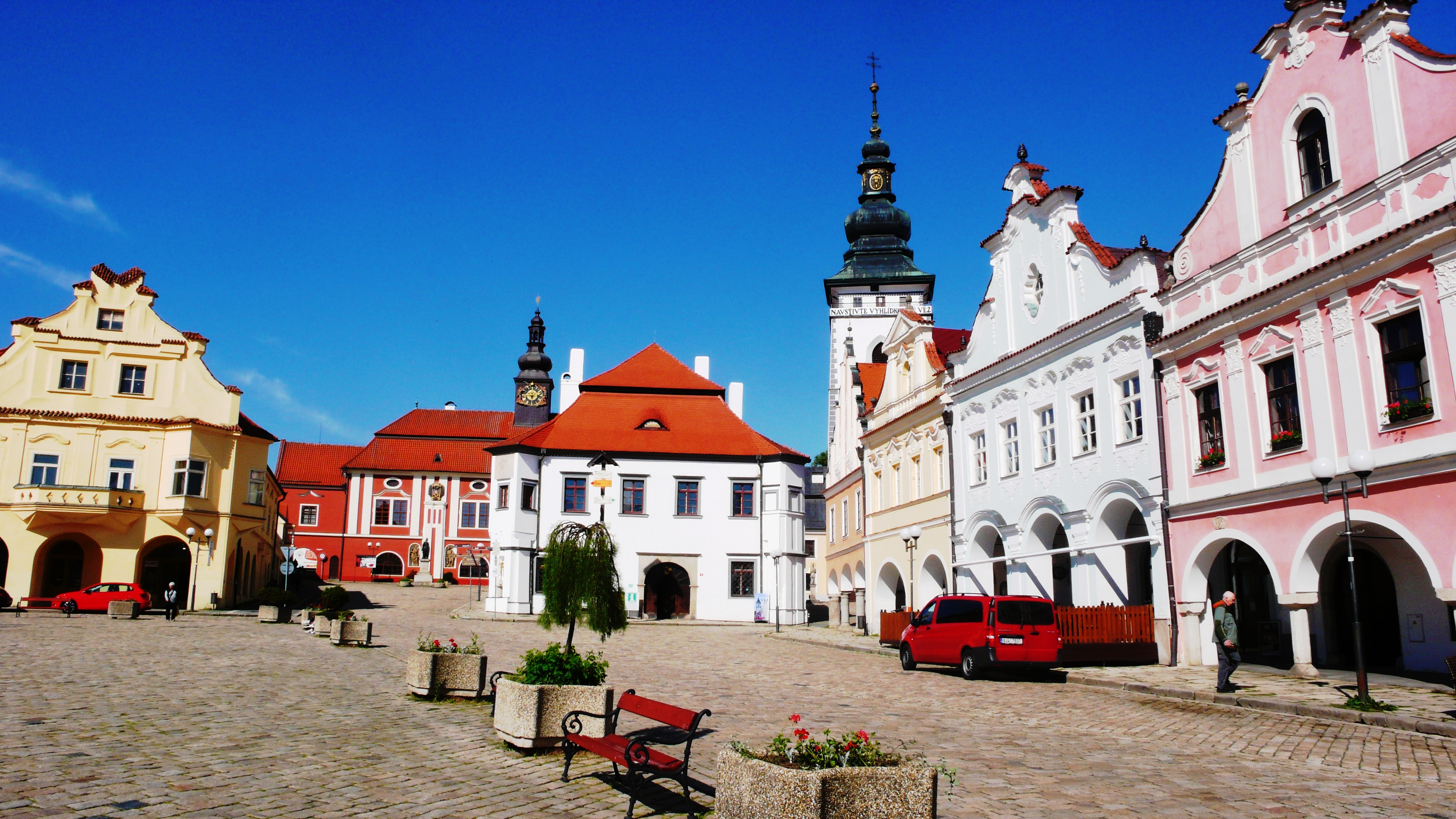
Masarykovo náměstí

The town square is lined by well-preserved valuable Baroque and Renaissance houses with arcades and decorated gables, and contains also Art Nouveau buildings. The Šrejnar's House was built in the Renaissance style in 1614. It houses a tourist information centre and the Memorial Hall of the Lipský Family. The Fára's House with Baroque façade and a mansard roof was rebuilt under a project by the architect Pavel Janák in the Cubist style in 1913–1914.

The Burgrave's House No. 17 was reconstructed after the fire in 1561. It features Renaissance, Neoclassical and Empire elements. The façade is decorated with sgraffiti. Today, there is an art gallery and a museum of bugaboos in its premises.

In the middle of the square is a fountain with the statue of Saint James the Great. The fountain was first mentioned in 1546 and the present-day appearance is from 1828.

=== Town fortifications ===
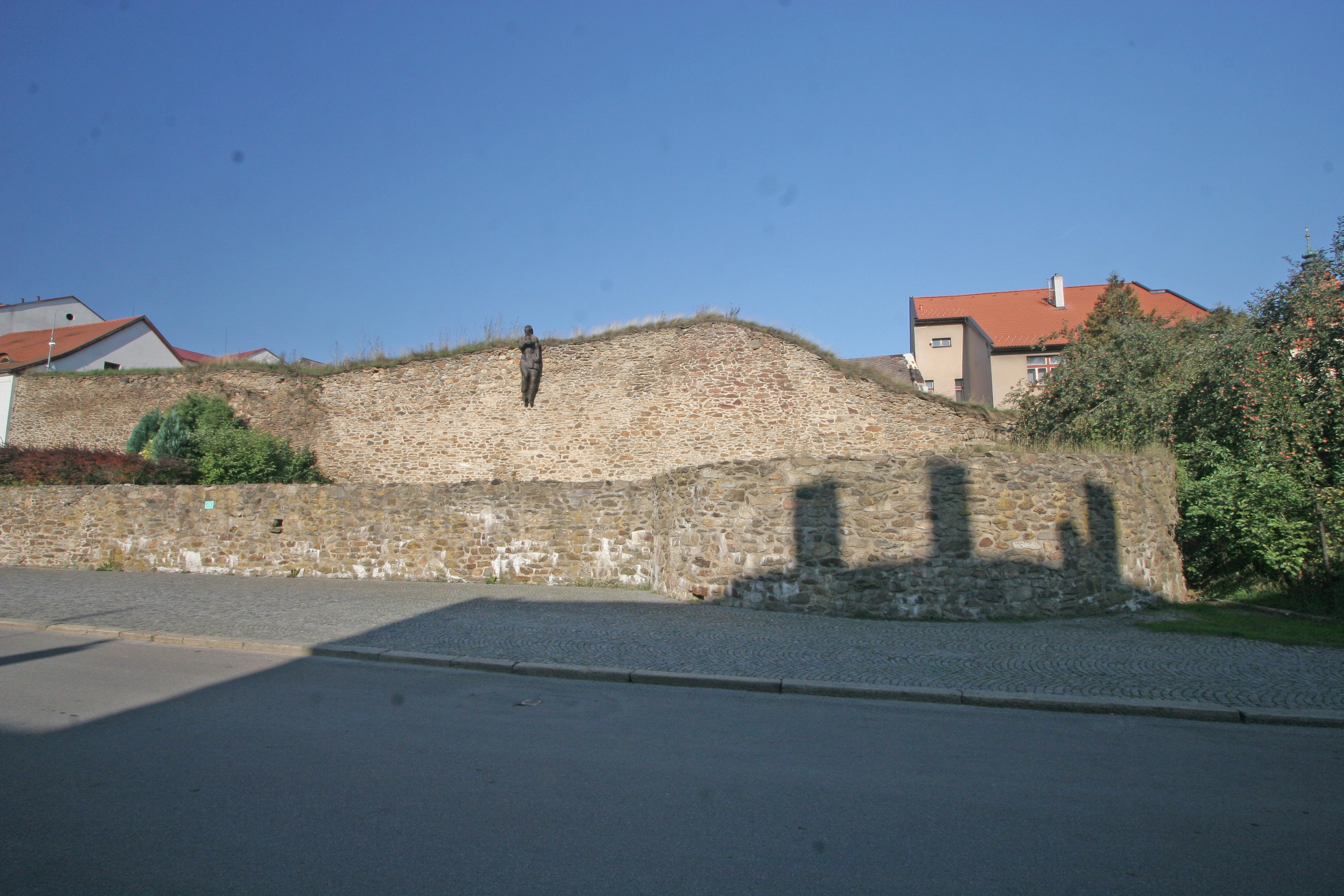
Remnants of the town fortifications

The Renaissance castle from 1550 replaced an old manor house. Its oldest part is a Gothic bastion, incorporated into the castle after the fire in 1561. One of the three preserved town gates is also part of the castle. Significant reconstructions were made after the castle was damaged by fires in 1682 and 1766. Since then, the castle has undergone only minor decorative alterations. Since 1908, it houses the Vysočina Museum Pelhřimov. Its exhibitions focuses on regional history and ethnography, town jail and torture instruments, and work of local artists Josef Šejnosta (sculptor and medalist) and his son Zdeněk Šejnosta (sculptor and restorer).

The Lower (Jihlava) Gatehouse and the Upper (Rynárec) Gatehouse were built in the 16th century as parts of the fortification system. The Lower Gatehouse is a 36 metres (118 ft)-high five-storeyed construction that today houses the Museum of Records and Curiosities.

=== Ecclesiastical buildings ===
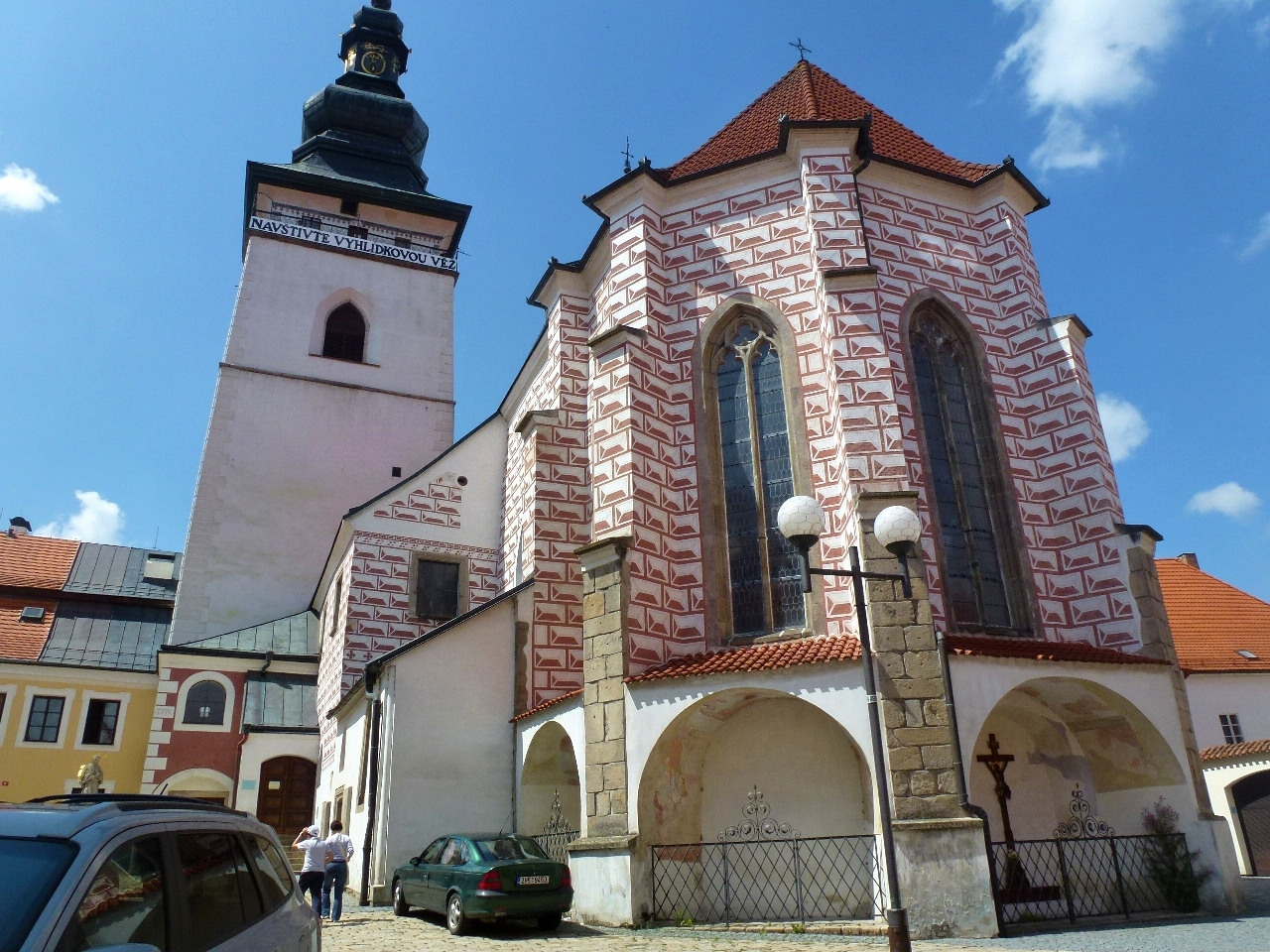
Church of Saint Bartholomew

The Church of Saint Bartholomew is one of the main landmarks of the town. It was built in Gothic style in the late 13th or the early 14th century. Since 1589, the church exterior shell has been adorned with sgraffiti. The interior of the church is mostly Baroque. On the main altar there are statues of saints Bartholomew, Adalbert, Procopius, Vitus and Wenceslaus. The Way of the Cross paintings in the church were designed by František Bílek and painted by Viktor Foerster. A tower with a viewing gallery at a height of 30 metres (98 ft) was added to the church in 1576. Today it is open to the public as a lookout tower.

The Church of Saint Vitus is documented in 1325 and is the oldest sacral building in Pelhřimov. The former parish church was originally built in the Gothic style, which is still evident in the presbytery. After many reconstructions, it contains Gothic, Renaissance and mainly Baroque elements. Nowadays the church is used as an exhibition and concert hall.

The Chapel of the Holy Cross was originally built in 1671 as a small replica of the Church of the Holy Sepulchre in Jerusalem. It was extended to a church in 1750 and a tower was added. In 1865, the town council decided to demolish the structure and build a new church. The new chapel was built in the neo-Gothic style in 1883–1886.

The pilgrimage Chapel of Our Lady of Sorrows was built in the Baroque style in 1710–1714. The crypt of the chapel used to be a burial place for members of burgher families. The town cemetery was transferred here from the Church of St. Vitus in 1787 and until 1906, it served as a cemetery chapel.

== Notable people ==
- Mikuláš of Pelhřimov (c. 1385 – c. 1459), Hussite priest and theologian
- Vojtěch Benedikt Juhn (1779–1843), painter
- Václav Fresl (1868–1915), politician
- Otomar Krejča (1921–2003), theatre director and dissident
- Lubomír Lipský (1923–2015), actor
- Oldřich Lipský (1924–1986), film director and screenwriter
- Joseph Veverka (born 1941), American astronomer
- František Vyskočil (born 1941), neurophysiologist
- Jan Kůrka (born 1943), sport shooter, Olympic winner
- Jiří Novotný (born 1983), ice hockey player
- Tomáš Sivok (born 1983), footballer
- Milan Kopic (born 1985), footballer
- Martin Frk (born 1993), ice hockey player
- Libor Šulák (born 1994), ice hockey player
- Kristýna Napoleaová (born 1996), golfer

== Twin towns – sister cities ==
Pelhřimov is twinned with:

- Dolný Kubín, Slovakia
- Mukachevo, Ukraine
- St. Valentin, Austria

== Gallery ==
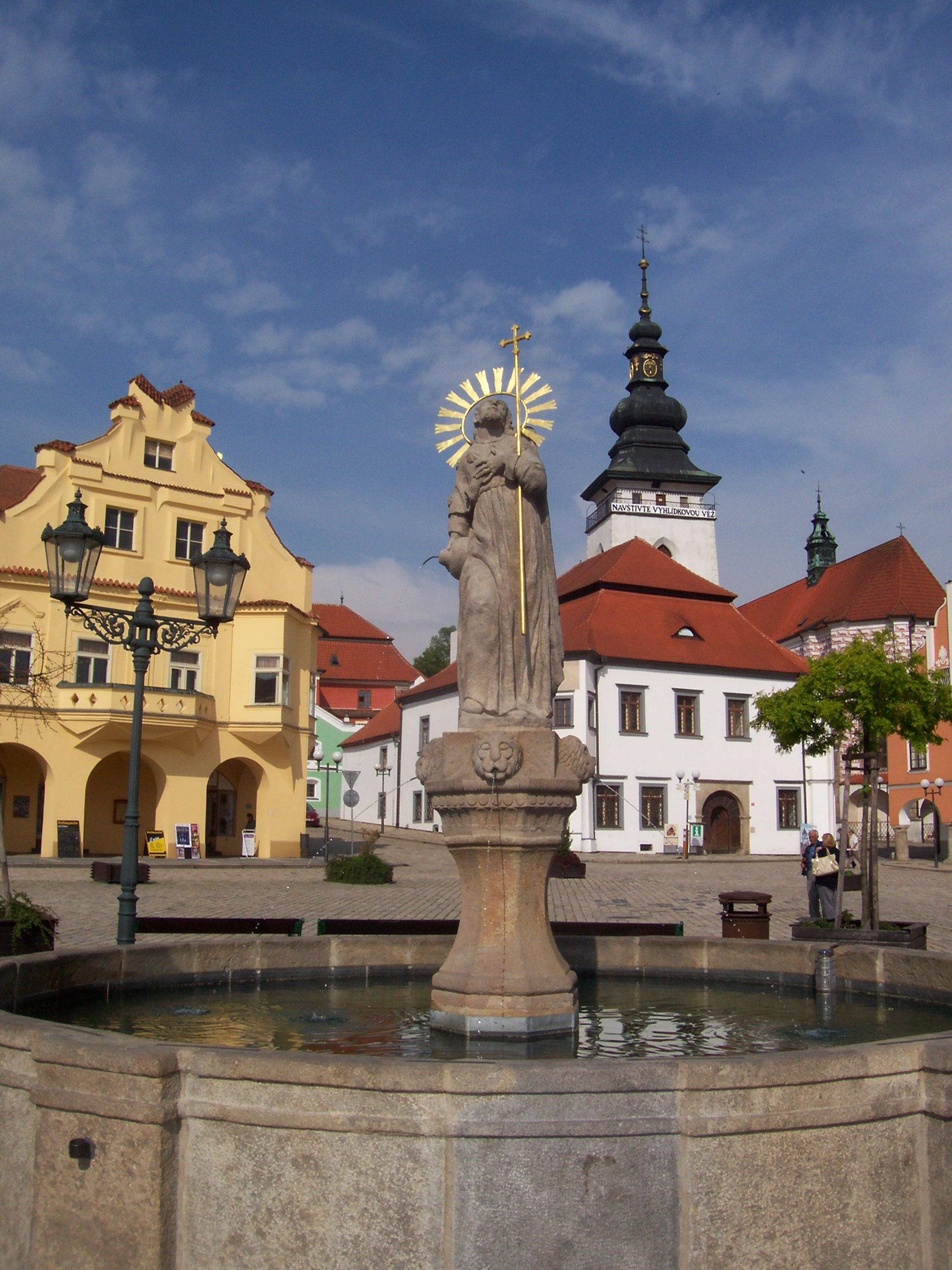
Fountain with the statue of St. James the Great

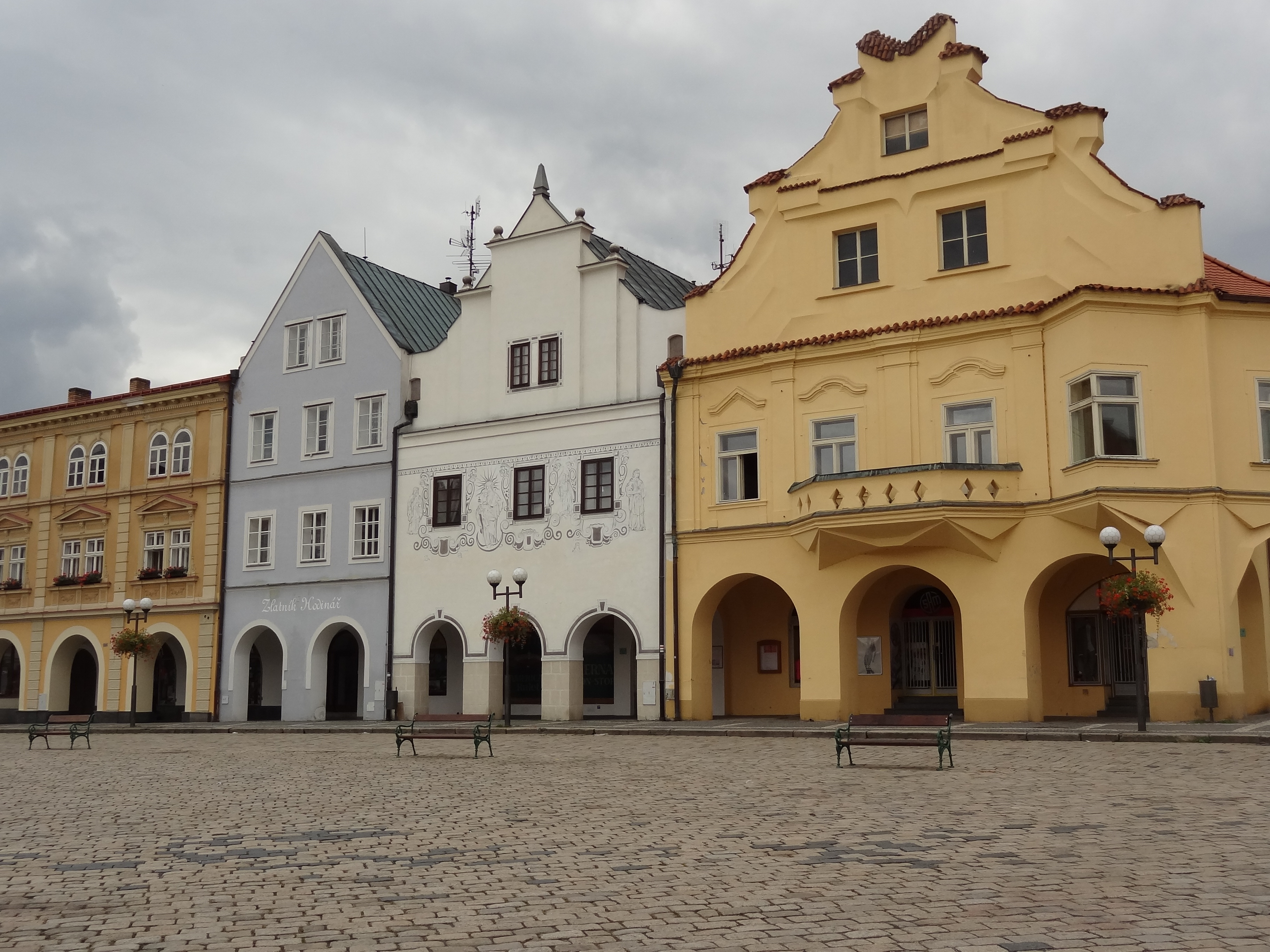
Burgher houses

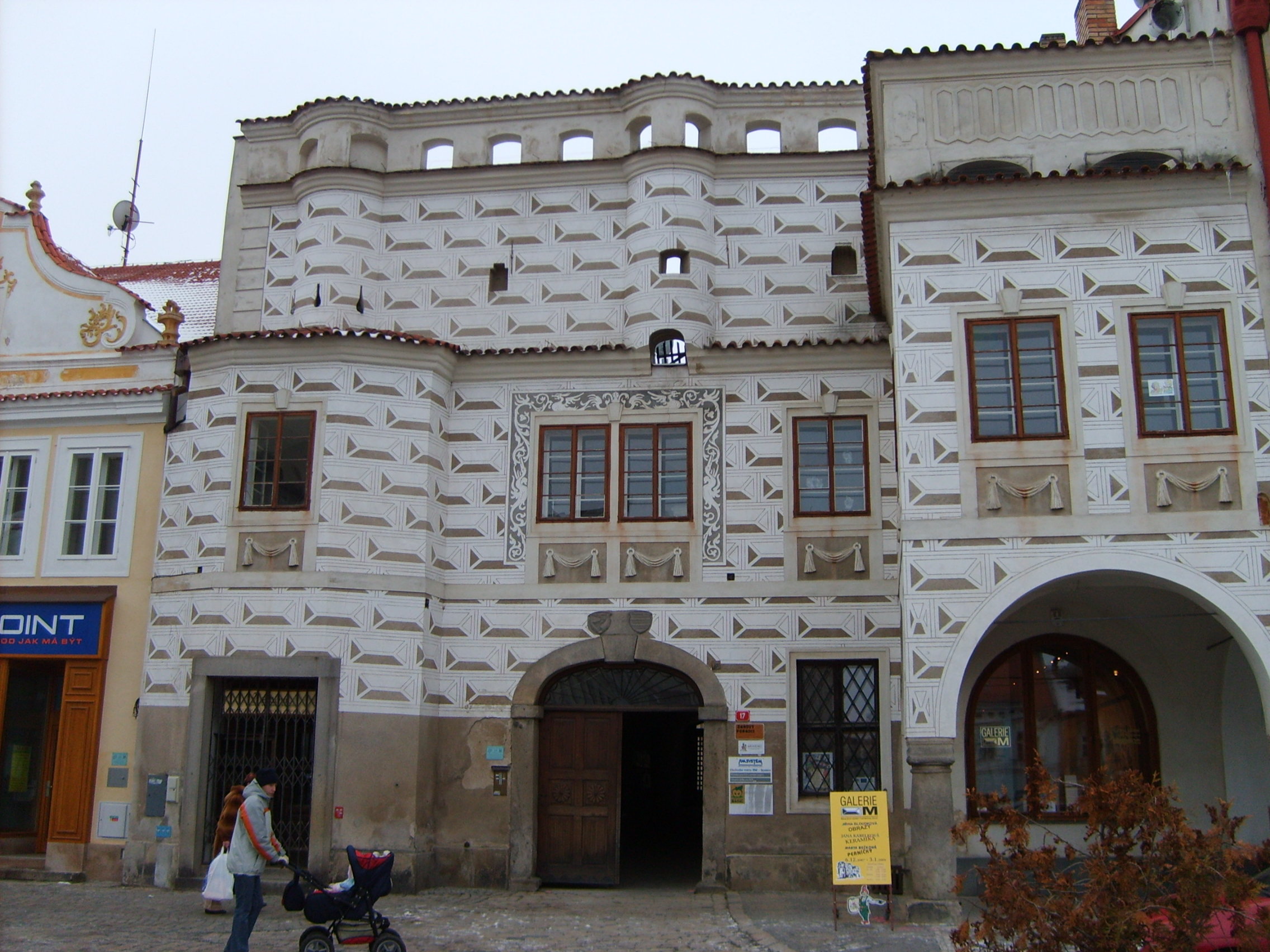
Burgrave's House No. 17

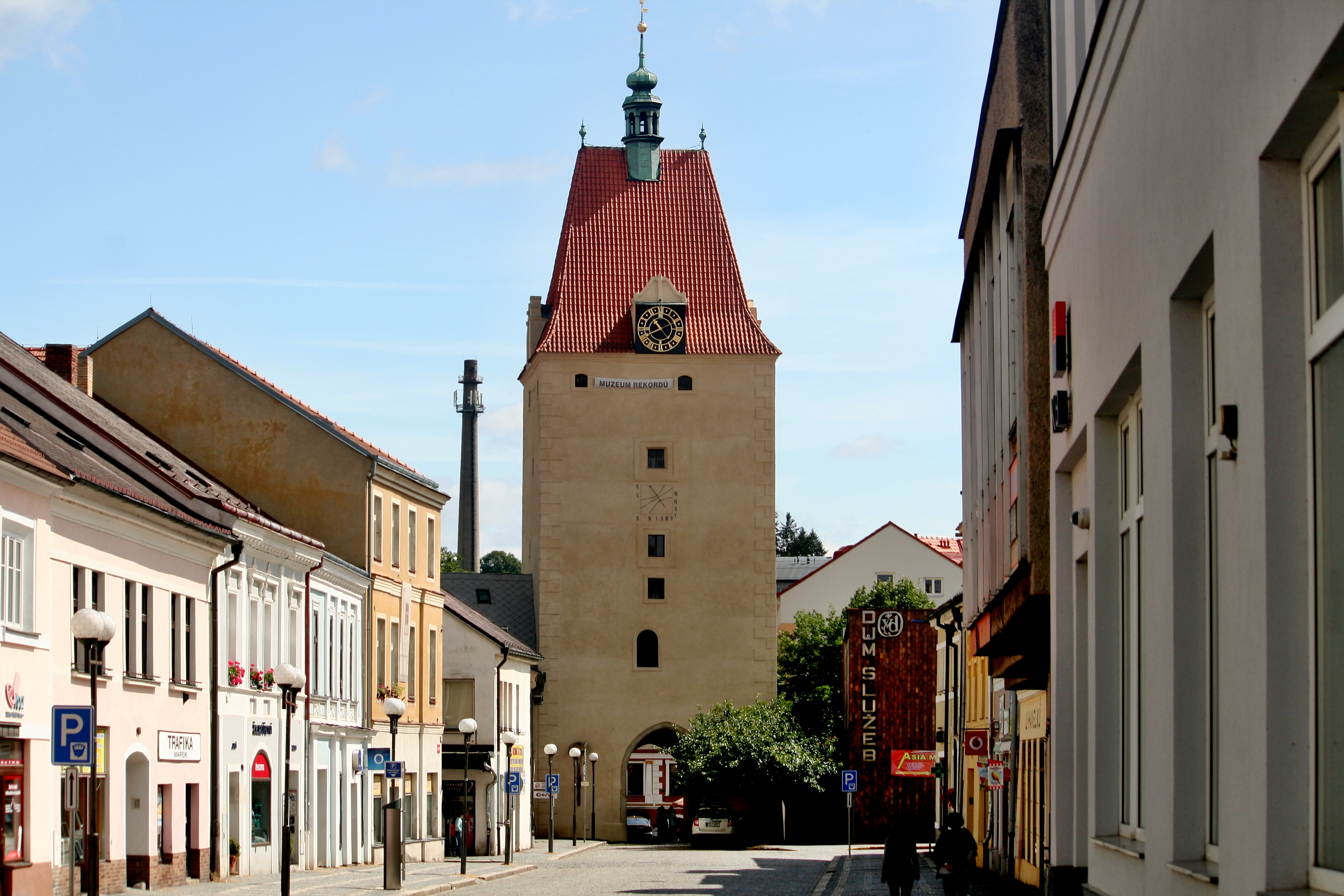
Jihlava Gate

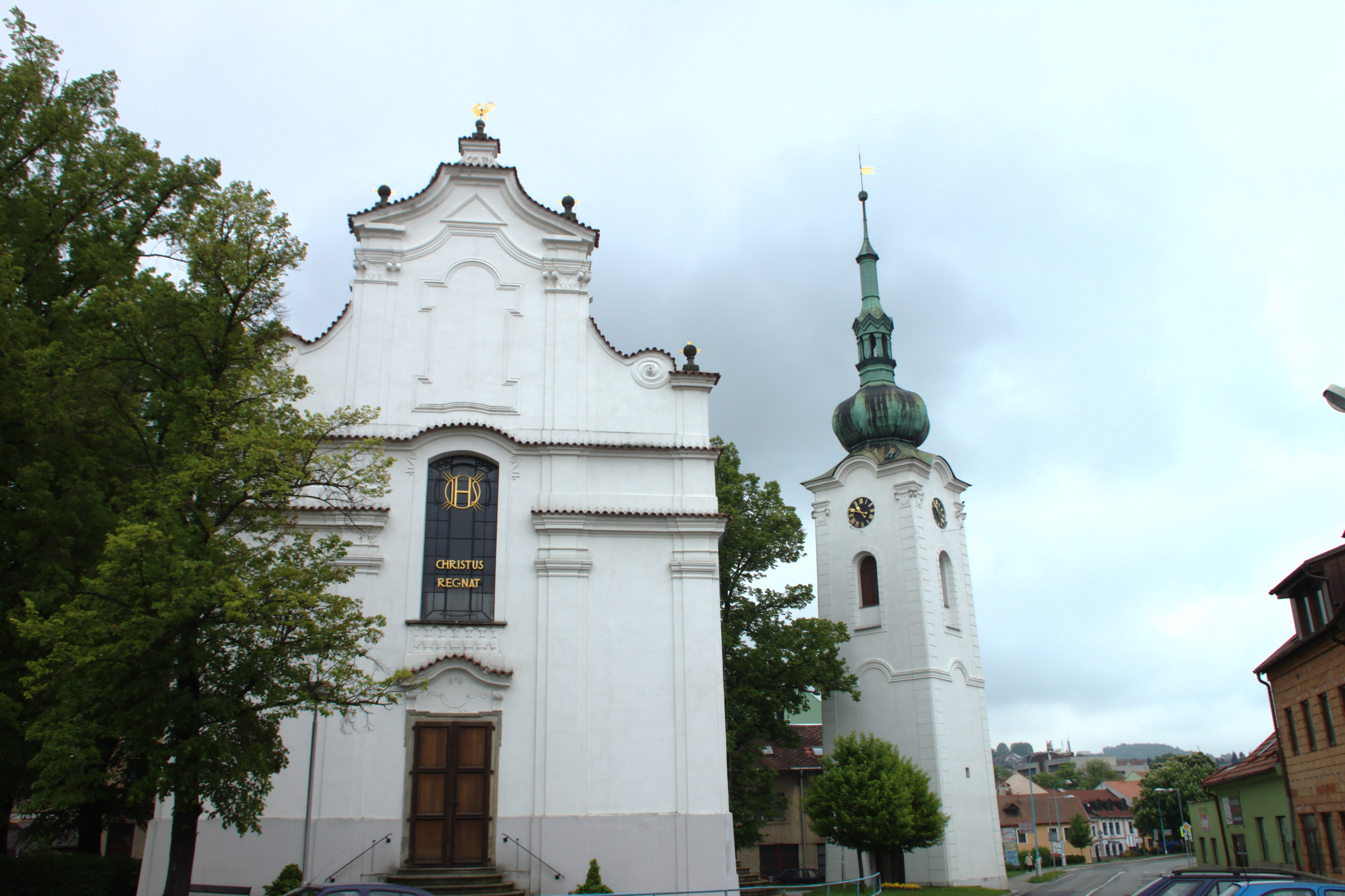
Church of Saint Vitus

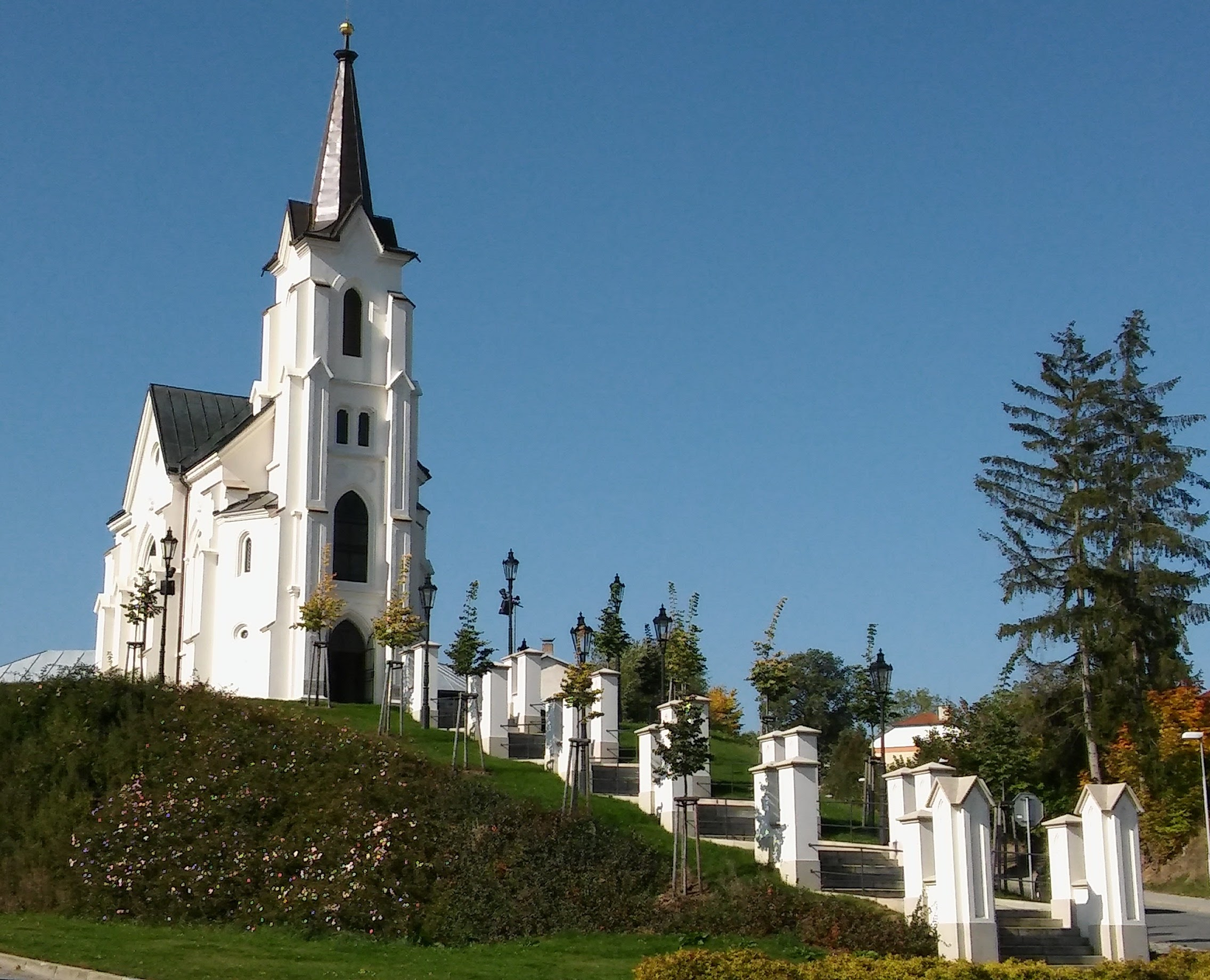
Chapel of the Holy Cross

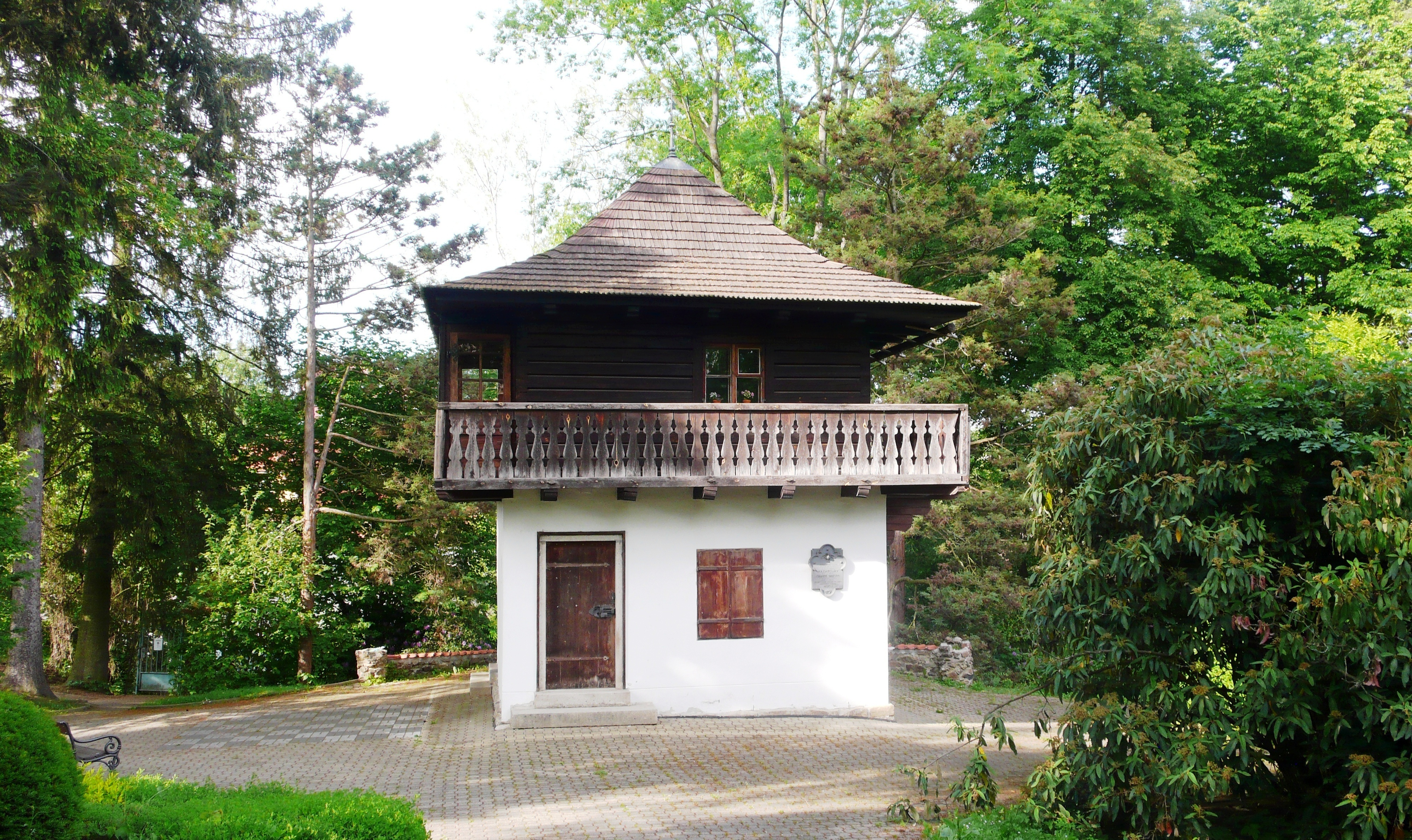
House of F. B. Vaněk in the Deacon's garden

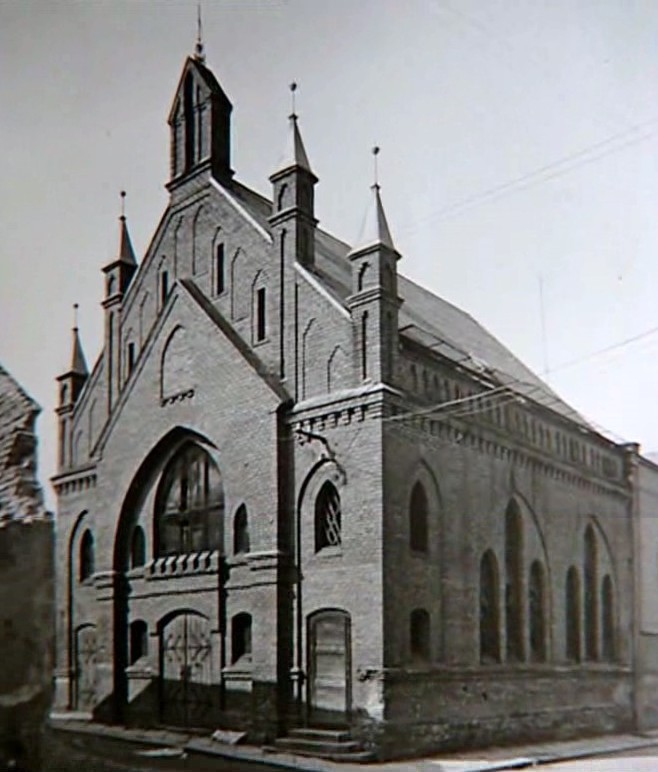
Synagogue, demolished in 1967
