= Hungarian Canoe Federation =

Sports governing body in Hungary

- Sport: Canoeing
- Founded: 30 July 1941
- Affiliation: International Canoe Federation
- Affiliation date: 1946
- Regional affiliation: European Canoe Association
- President: Etele Baráth

Official website
- kajakkenusport.hu
- (Hungary)

The Hungarian Canoe Federation (Hungarian: Magyar Kajak-Kenu Szövetség, pronounced [ˈmɒɟɒr ˈkɒjɒk ˈkɛnu ˈsøvɛt͡ʃːeːɡ], MKKSZ) is the governing body of Canoe in Hungary. It organizes the Hungarian representation at international competitions and the Hungarian National Championships.

The Federation was formed on July 30, 1941, in Budapest. It became a member of the International Canoe Federation and of the European Canoe Association.

== International competitions in Hungary ==
World Championships:

- 1998 ICF Canoe Sprint World Championships – Szeged, 3–6 September
- 2006 ICF Canoe Sprint World Championships – Szeged, 17–20 August
- 2011 ICF Canoe Sprint World Championships – Szeged, 17–21 August
- 2019 ICF Canoe Sprint World Championships – Szeged,

European Championships:

- 2002 Canoe Sprint European Championships – Szeged, 18–21 July

== International achievements ==
Event	Gold medal	Silver medal	Bronze medal	Pos.
Olympic Games	22	29	26	3rd
World Championships	200	150	134	1st
European Championships	112	99	52	1st

=== Olympic Games ===
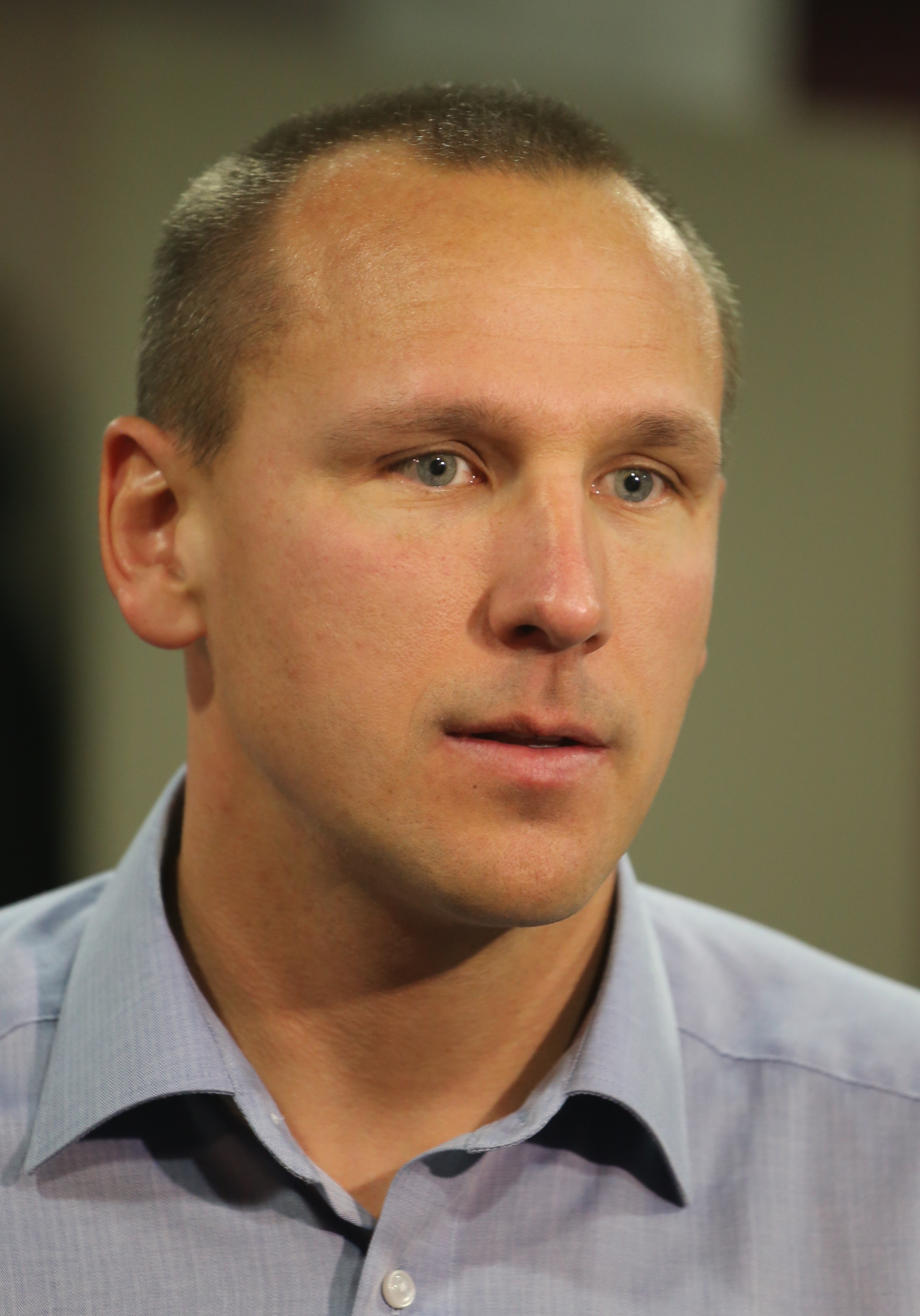
Botond Stocz - Olympic, World and European champion

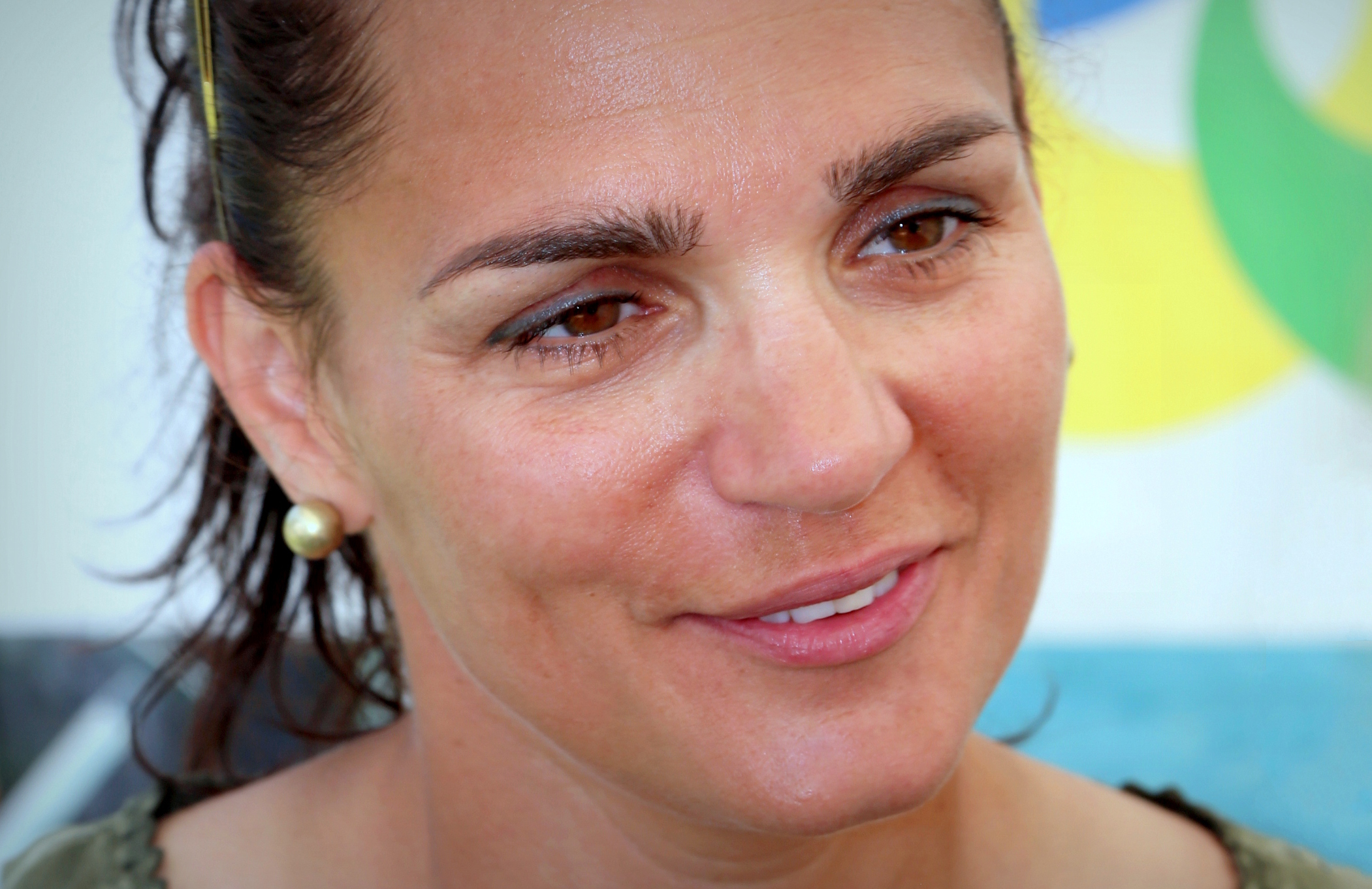
Katalin Kovács - Olympic, World and European champion

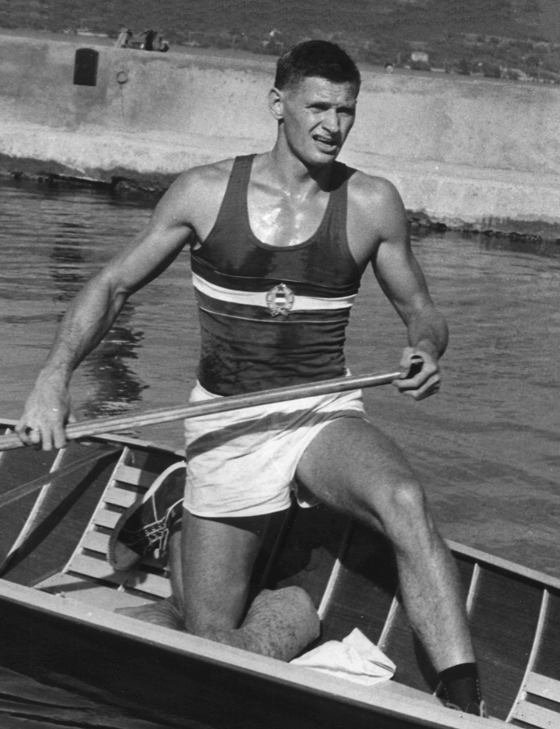
János Parti - Olympic, World and European champion

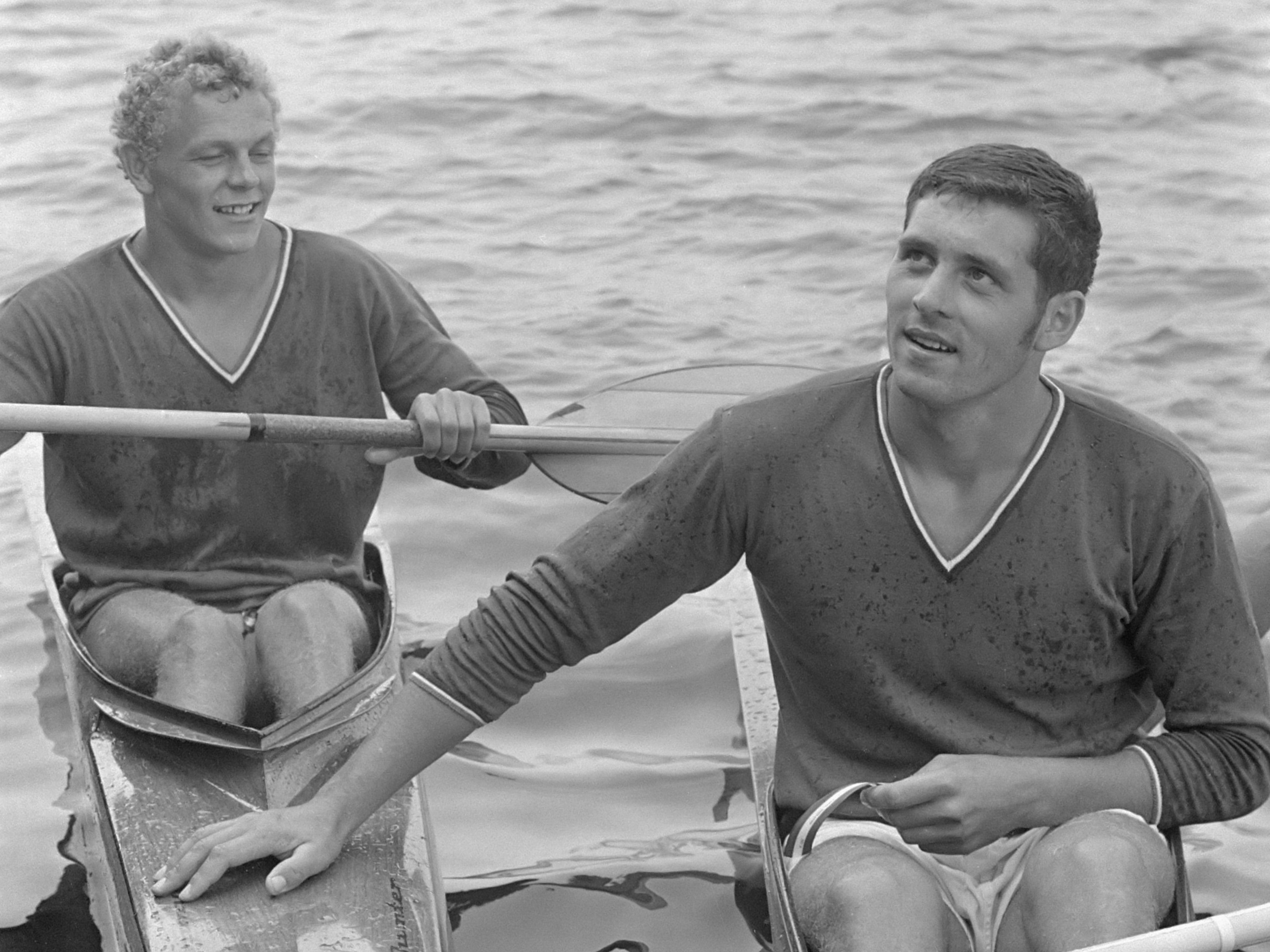
Géza Csapó (r) - World and European champion

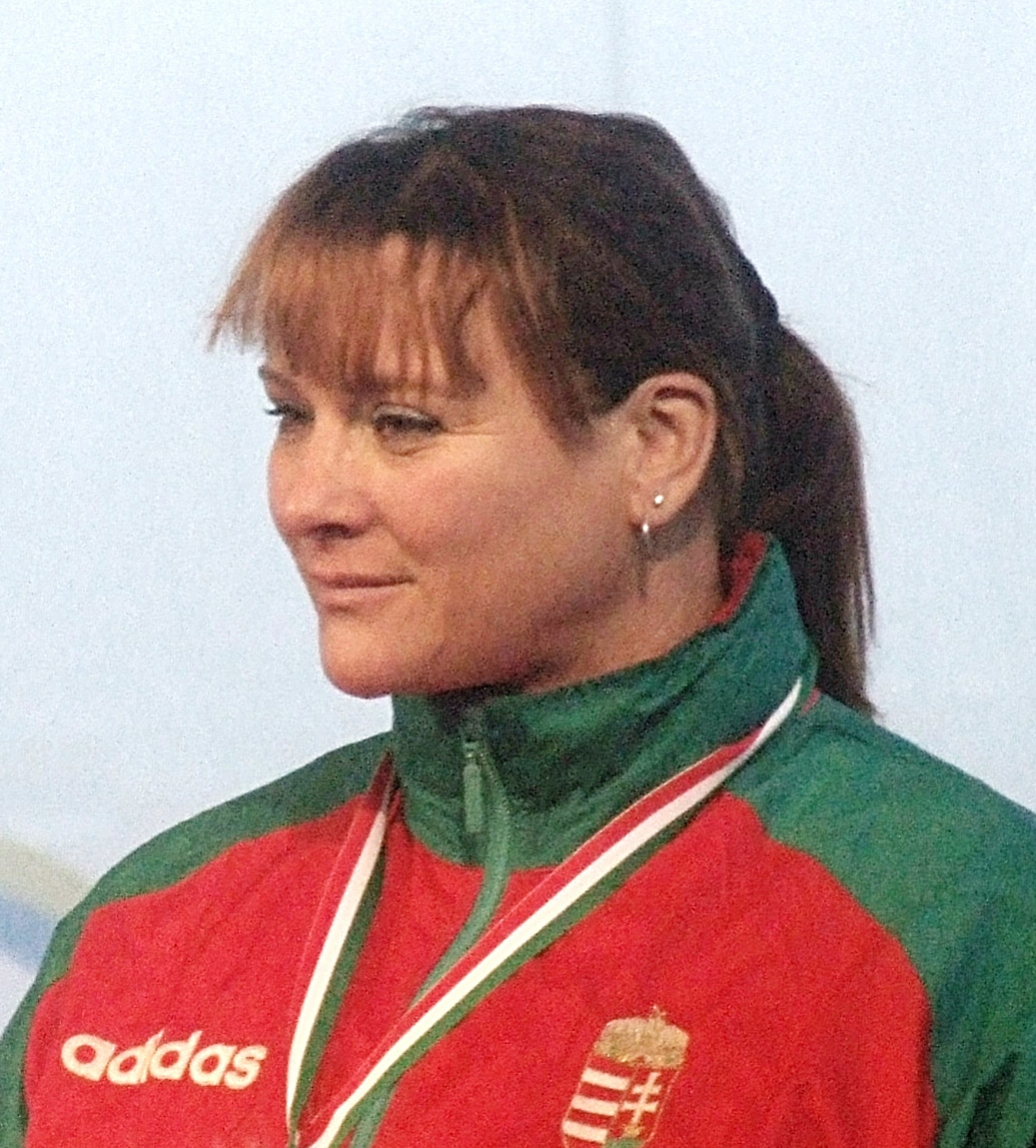
Rita Kőbán - Olympic, World and European champion

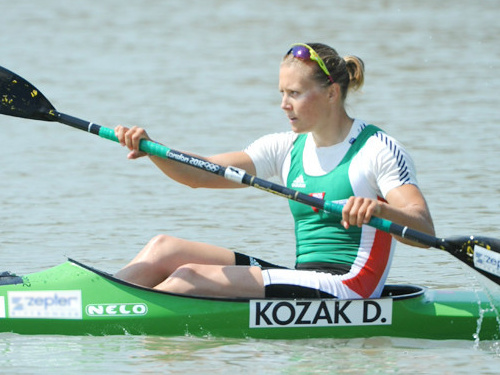
Danuta Kozák - Olympic, World and European champion

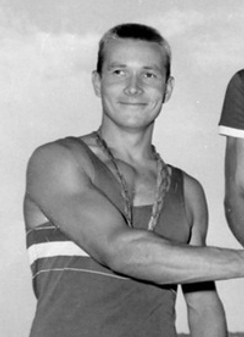
Imre Szőlősi - World and European champion

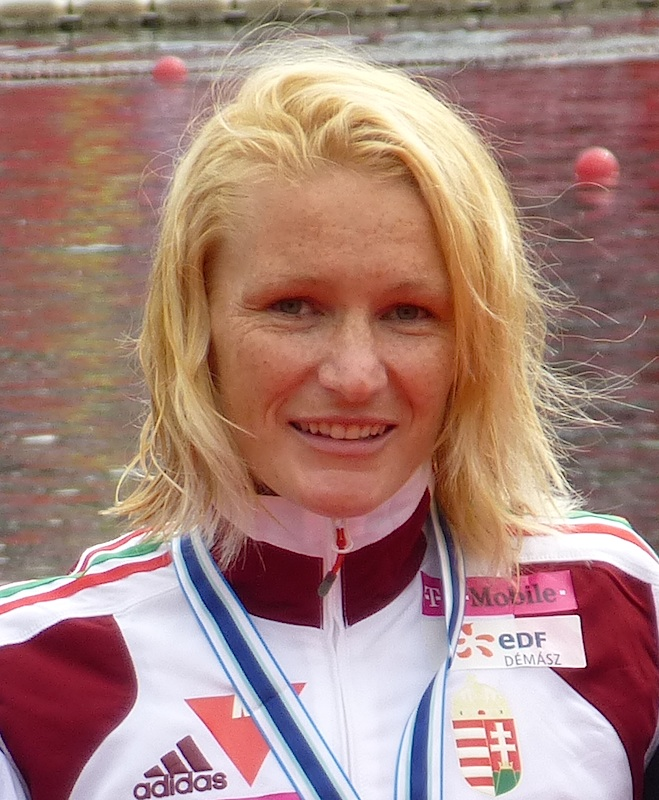
Natasa Janics - Olympic, World and European champion

Year	Host city	No. of canoer	Gold	Silver	Bronze	Total	
1936	(Germany) Berlin	5	0	0	0	0	-
1948	(United Kingdom) London	5	0	0	0	0	-
1952	(Finland) Helsinki	12	0	2	1	3	VII.
1956	(Australia) Melbourne	13	1	3	3	7	IV.
1960	(Italy) Rome	9	1	3	2	6	II.
1964	(Japan) Tokyo	10	0	1	0	1	VI.
1968	Mexico City	10	2	3	1	6	I.
1972	(West Germany) Munich	12	0	2	2	4	V.
1976	(Canada) Montreal	14	0	3	5	8	V.
1980	(Soviet Union) Moscow	16	1	1	1	3	V.
1988	(South Korea) Seoul	16	2	1	1	4	III.
1992	(Spain) Barcelona	14	1	3	2	6	III.
1996	(United States) Atlanta	19	2	1	3	6	IV.
2000	(Australia) Sydney	15	4	2	1	7	I.
2004	(Greece) Athens	16	3	1	2	6	II.
2008	(China) Beijing	16	2	1	1	4	III.
2012	(United Kingdom) London	13	3	2	1	6	II.
2016	(Brazil) Rio de Janeiro	18	3	0	0	3	III.
2020	(Japan) Tokyo						
Total			25	29	26	80	III.

=== World Championships ===
Year	Host city	Gold	Silver	Bronze	Total	
1938	(Sweden) Vaxholm	0	1	0	1	VI.
1954	(France) Mâcon	6	5	5	16	I.
1958	(Czechoslovakia) Prague	1	5	0	6	IV.
1963	(Socialist Federal Republic of Yugoslavia) Jajce	2	0	4	6	IV.
1966	(East Germany) East Berlin	3	3	5	11	III.
1970	(Denmark) Copenhagen	2	2	3	7	III.
1971	(Socialist Federal Republic of Yugoslavia) Belgrade	4	5	2	11	II.
1973	(Finland) Tampere	7	4	5	16	II.
1974	Mexico City	3	4	3	10	III.
1975	(Socialist Federal Republic of Yugoslavia) Belgrade	4	3	5	12	II.
1977	(Bulgaria) Sofia	3	4	4	11	III.
1978	(Socialist Federal Republic of Yugoslavia) Belgrade	4	2	2	8	II.
1979	(West Germany) Duisburg	2	2	3	7	IV.
1981	(United Kingdom) Nottingham	3	3	2	8	III.
1982	(Socialist Federal Republic of Yugoslavia) Belgrade	2	3	6	11	III.
1983	(Finland) Tampere	1	2	2	5	IV.
1985	(Belgium) Mechelen	3	3	2	8	II.
1986	(Canada) Montreal	7	3	1	11	I.
1987	(West Germany) Duisburg	2	5	2	9	II.
1989	(Bulgaria) Plovdiv	3	6	2	11	III.
1990	(Poland) Poznań	2	6	3	11	III.
1991	(France) Paris	4	5	3	12	II.
1993	(Denmark) Copenhagen	5	5	2	12	II.
1994	Mexico City	6	12	2	20	I.
1995	(Germany) Duisburg	9	3	3	15	I.
1997	(Canada) Dartmouth	8	6	2	16	II.
1998	(Hungary) Szeged	7	5	5	17	I.
1999	(Italy) Milan	6	2	8	16	II.
2001	(Poland) Poznań	8	4	4	16	I.
2002	(Spain) Seville	6	1	4	11	I.
2003	(United States) Gainesville	10	1	3	14	I.
2005	(Croatia) Zagreb	6	3	3	12	II.
2006	(Hungary) Szeged	12	2	4	18	I.
2007	(Germany) Duisburg	9	3	6	18	II.
2009	(Canada) Dartmouth	6	4	2	12	II.
2010	(Poland) Poznań	6	5	1	12	I.
2011	(Hungary) Szeged	6	1	3	10	II.
2013	(Germany) Duisburg	7	5	5	17	II.
2014	(Russia) Moscow	6	5	6	17	I.
2015	(Italy) Milan	3	6	4	13	III.
2017	(Czech Republic) Račice					
2018	(Portugal) Montemor-o-Velho					
2019	(Hungary) Szeged					
Total		200	150	134	484	I.

=== European Championships ===
Year	Host city	Gold	Silver	Bronze	Total	
1957	(Belgium) Ghent	3	1	2	6	
1959	(West Germany) Duisburg	7	6	4	17	
1961	(Poland) Poznań	4	2	5	11	
1963	(Socialist Federal Republic of Yugoslavia) Jajce	2	0	4	6	
1965	(Romania) Bucharest	1	3	4	8	
1967	(West Germany) Duisburg	2	1	2	5	
1969	(Soviet Union) Moscow	4	3	4	11	
1997	(Bulgaria) Plovdiv	9	6	3	18	I.
1999	(Croatia) Zagreb	2	9	1	12	IV.
2000	(Poland) Poznań	5	7	3	15	I.
2001	(Italy) Milan	8	9	3	20	I.
2002	(Hungary) Szeged	10	7	2	19	I.
2004	(Poland) Poznań	10	4	4	18	I.
2005	(Poland) Poznań	6	7	2	15	II.
2006	(Czech Republic) Račice	10	4	4	18	I.
2007	(Spain) Pontevedra	6	7	7	20	II.
2008	(Italy) Milan	6	7	5	18	I.
2009	(Germany) Brandenburg	6	9	2	17	II.
2010	(Spain) Trasona	6	4	2	12	II.
2011	(Serbia) Belgrade	6	2	2	10	I.
2012	(Croatia) Zagreb	5	2	3	10	II.
2013	(Portugal) Montemor-o-Velho	4	3	5	12	III.
2014	(Germany) Brandenburg	8	5	0	13	I.
2015	(Czech Republic) Račice	0	2	0	2	XII.
2016	(Russia) Moscow	5	5	4	14	I.
2017	(Germany) Duisburg					
Total		112	99	52	263	I.

== Notable kayakers, canoers ==
=== Canoe (C) ===
Men's

- Gábor Árva (1948– ), World champion
- Gábor Balázs ( – ), World and European medalist
- Péter Balázs (1906–1989), 2x World champion and European medalist
- Béla Belicza (1969– ), 2x World and 2x European champion
- Lajos Bodnár (1937–2005), World medalist
- István Bodor (1927– ), World medalist
- Zsolt Bohács (1964– ), 5x World and European champion
- Boldizsár Gáspár (1967– ), 2x World champion
- Attila Bozsik, 2x European champion and World medalist
- Tamás Buday (1952– ), 4x World champion and Olympic medalist
- Miklós Buzál, European champion and World medalist
- Edvin Csabai (1976– ), World Games, 17x World and 4x European champion
- István Cserha (1945–2001), European champion and World medalist
- Ferenc Csonka, World medalist
- Miklós Darvas (1949– ), World champion
- Gyula Dömötör (1933– ), European champion
- Dr. Dezső Csépai, World medalist
- Dr. János Parti (1932–1999), Olympic, World and 3x European champion
- Oszkár Faix, European medalist
- Imre Farkas, Olympic and European medalist
- Imre Feil, European medalist
- László Foltán (1953– ), Olympic and 3x World champion
- ifj. László Foltán, World and 2x European champion
- Oszkár Frey (1953– ), World champion and Olympic medalist
- Gábor Fürdök, 2x European champion
- Áron Gajárszki, World medalist
- Attila Györe (1975– ), World Games, 11x World and 7x European champion
- István Gyulai (1966– ), World champion
- Endre Gyűrű (1945– ), World medalist
- Antal Hajba (1938– ), World champion
- Gyula Hajdú (1957– ), World champion
- József Halmai (1934– ), World champion
- Gábor Haraszti (1948–1986), World medalist
- István Hernek (1935– ), Olympic and World medalist
- László Hingl (1945– ), European champion and World medalist
- Ervin Hoffmann (1969– ), 4x World champion and European medalist
- Csaba Horváth (1971– ), Olympic, 13x World and 2x European champion
- Gábor Horváth, 2x World champion and European medalist
- András Hubik, World medalist
- József Hunics (1936–2012), European champion and Olympic medalist
- Csaba Hüttner (1971– ), 4x World and 2x European champion
- Endre Ipacs (1971– ), World medalist
- Gábor Iván, World and 2x European champion
- Márton Joób, 3x World champion and European medalist
- Tamás Kiss, Olympic medalist
- György Kolonics (1972–2008), 2x Olympic, 15x World and 3x European champion
- Gergely Kovács, European medalist
- György Kozmann (1978– ), 3x World, 3x European champion and Olympic medalist
- Gusztáv Leikep (1966– ), World medalist
- Attila Lipták, World medalist
- Gábor Máté, European medalist
- Márton Metka, World and European medalist
- Róbert Mike, European champion and World medalist
- Ferenc Mohácsi (1929– ), Olympic medalist
- Gergő Németh, World medalist
- Ferenc Novák (1969– ), Olympic, 3x World and 2x European champion
- Gábor Novák (1934– ), European champion, World and Olympic medalist
- Attila Pálizs (1967– ), World champion
- Zoltán Parti, World medalist
- András Péter, World medalist
- Pál Pétervári (1955– ), World champion
- Gyula Petrikovics (1943–2005), World, European champion and Olympic medalist
- Péter Povázsay (1946– ), World champion
- Imre Pulai (1967– ), Olympic, 4x World and European champion
- Róbert Rideg, World medalist
- Mátyás Sáfrán, European champion and World medalist
- Mihály Sáfrán, European champion and World medalist
- Pál Sarudi, World champion and European medalist
- János Sarusi Kiss (1960– ), 4x World champion
- Mihály Sasvári, World medalist
- László Simári, World medalist
- Árpád Soltész, World medalist
- Attila Szabó (1963– ), 5x World champion
- Csaba Szántó (1945– ), World medalist
- Károly Szegedi (1953–1978), World medalist
- László Szuszkó (1973– ), 2x World and European champion
- Gábor Takács (1959–2007), World medalist
- Tibor Takács (1969– ), 2x World and European champion
- Tibor Tatai (1944– ), Olympic, World champion and European medalist
- András Törő (1940– ), Olympic medalist
- Márton Tóth, European champion and World medalist
- József Tuza (1928–2008), World medalist
- Attila Vajda (1983– ), Olympic, 3x World and 2x European champion
- Zsolt Varga, World medalist
- Henrik Vasbányai, World and European medalist
- István Vaskuti (1955– ), Olympic and 9x World champion
- Attila Végh, European champion and World medalist
- Viktor Volein, European medalist
- Tamás Wichmann (1948–2020), 9x World, 3x European champion and Olympic medalist
- Károly Wieland (1934– ), World champion and Olympic medalist
- György Zala (1969– ), World, European champion and Olympic medalist

Women's

- Gyöngyvér Baravics ( – ), World medalist
- Zsanett Lakatos, World and European champion
- Dorina Obermayer, World medalist
- Kincső Takács, European champion and World medalist

=== Kayak (K) ===
Men's

- Attila Ábrahám (1967– ), Olympic and 5x World champion
- Attila Ádám ( – ), World medalist
- Attila Adrovicz (1966– ), Olympic and World medalist
- Mihály Agócs (1972– )
- Gábor Almási, World medalist
- Péter Almási (1975– ), European champion
- Ákos Angyal, World medalist
- Zoltán Angyal (1953– ), World medalist
- Zoltán Antal, World medalist
- Balázs Babella, 2x World and 2x European champion
- László Babella (1939– )
- Zoltán Bakó (1951– ), 5x World champion and Olympic medalist
- Kamill Balatoni (1912–1945), World medalist
- Krisztián Bártfai (1974– ), World champion, Olympic and European medalist
- Márton Bauer, World medalist
- István Beé (1972– ), 5x World and 5x European champion
- Tamás Benkő, World medalist
- Zoltán Benkő, 2x European champion
- Zoltán Berkes ( ), World medalist
- Zsolt Böjti (1966– ), World champion
- József Bokody (1928– ),
- Zsombor Borhi (1972– ), 2x World and European champion
- Attila Boros (1982– ), World and European medalist
- Gergely Boros, World and European champion
- Gábor Bozsik, World champion and European medalist
- Attila Csamangó, World and European medalist
- Géza Csapó (1950– ), 6x World champion and Olympic medalist
- Attila Császár, World medalist
- Ferenc Cseh, World medalist
- Ferenc Csipes (1965– ), Olympic and 8x World champion
- István Csizmadia (1944– ), World champion, Olympic and European medalist
- Tibor Komáromi (1939– ), European champion
- József Deme (1951– ), 2x World champion and Olympic medalist
- Rudolf Dombi (1986– ), Olympic, European champion and World medalist
- Dr. István Irmai, World medalist
- Dr. László Nagy (1931–2004), European medalist
- Dr. László Nagy (1930– ), World champion and European medalist
- Miklós Dudás (1991– ), World and European medalist
- Sámuel Egri, European medalist
- István Fábián, World medalist
- László Fábián (1936– ), Olympic, 4x World and 5x European champion
- Vince Fehérvári (1972– ), 7x World and 5x European champion
- László Fidel (1965– ), 5x World champion and Olympic medalist
- Csaba Giczy (1945– ), 3x World, European champion and Olympic medalist
- László Gindl (1965– ), World champion
- Gábor Gönczy, European medalist
- József Gurovits (1928– ), Olympic medalist
- Gergely Gyertyános, World and European champion
- Lajos Gyökös, World champion and European medalist
- Zsolt Gyulay (1964– ), 2x Olympic, 6x World champion
- Gergely Hadvina, European medalist
- Ferenc Hatlaczky (1934–1986), World, European champion and Olympic medalist
- Endre Hazsik (1941– ), World medalist
- Róbert Hegedűs (1973– ), 7x World and 5x European champion
- Tibor Helyi (1963– ), World champion
- Iván Herczeg (1943– ), World champion
- Mihály Hesz (1943– ), Olympic, 2x World champion and European medalist
- Sándor Hódosi (1966– ), Olympic and 2x World champion
- Gábor Horváth (1971– ), 2x Olympic, 3x World and 2x European champion
- István Joós (1953– ), Olympic and World medalist
- Viktor Kadler, 2x World and 2x European champion
- Gyula Kajner (1967– ), 3x World and European champion
- Zoltán Kammerer (1978– ), 3x Olympic, 3x World and 5x European champion
- Imre Kemecsei (1941– ), European champion, Olympic and World medalist
- Lajos Kiss (1934–2014), World and European medalist
- Roland Kökény (1975– ), Olympic, 2x World and 2x European champion
- Ottó Koltai (1943– ), World champion
- Péter Konecsni, World medalist
- Kálmán Kovács (1942– ), World and European medalist
- László Kovács (1932– ), World champion and European medalist
- Zoltán Kovács (1965– ), 3x World champion
- Géza Kralován (1946– ), World champion
- Gábor Kucsera (1982– ), 2x World and 3x European champion
- Gábor Kulcsár (1963– ), World champion
- Tamás Kulifai (1989– ), World champion, Olympic and European medalist
- Zoltán Lőrinczy, World medalist
- György Mészáros (1933–2015), World, 2x European champion and Olympic medalist
- István Mészáros (1933–1994), World champion
- Péter Molnár, 2x European champion
- Tibor Nagy (1947– ), World champion
- Vilmos Nagy, World medalist
- Szabolcs Németh, World and European medalist
- László Nieberl, World medalist
- Milán Noé, European medalist
- László Novotny (1941– ), European medalist
- Zoltán Páger (1967– ), World champion
- Gábor Pankotai (1971– ), World champion
- Dániel Pauman (1986– ), Olympic and European medalist
- József Péhl (1932–2015), World medalist
- János Petróczky (1937– ), 2x European champion and World medalist
- Béla Petrovics, World medalist
- Kálmán Petrovics (1961– ), World champion
- András Rajna (1960– ), Olympic and World medalist
- János Rátkai (1951– ), World champion and Olympic medalist
- Zoltán Romhányi, World medalist
- Róbert Schaffhauser, World medalist
- Márton Sík, World and European medalist
- András Sován (1933–1998), European champion and World medalist
- Botond Storcz (1975– ), 3x Olympic, 4x World and 4x European champion
- József Svidró (1950– ), World champion
- Gábor Szabó, World medalist
- István Szabó (1950– ), 5x World champion and Olympic medalist
- László Szabó, World medalist
- Zsolt Szádovszky (1974– ), World medalist
- Tamás Szalai, European champion
- András Szente, European champion, Olympic and World medalist
- Zoltán Szigeti (1932– ), World champion
- István Szijjártó, World medalist
- Imre Szőlősi, World, 5x European champion and Olympic medalist
- Ervin Szörenyi, World medalist
- Zoltán Sztanity (1954– ), World champion and Olympic medalist
- István Tímár (1940–1994), 2x World champion, Olympic and European medalist
- Dávid Tóth (1985– ), World champion, Olympic and European medalist
- István Tóth, World medalist
- János Urányi (1924–1964), Olympic, World and European champion
- László Ürögi (1940– ), World and 2x European champion
- Imre Vágyóczky (1932– ), World champion
- Ferenc Varga (1925– ), Olympic and World medalist
- Csongor Varga (1946– ), 3x World champion
- Péter Várhelyi (1950– ), World champion
- Dezső Veréb (1935–2005), European medalist
- Krisztián Veréb (1977– ), 3x World and European champion
- Ákos Vereckei (1977– ), 2x Olympic, 6x World and 8x European champion
- László Vincze, World medalist
- Péter Völgyi, World medalist
- Ferenc Wagner (1929–2011), World medalist

Women's

- Anikó Balogh (1940– ), European medalist
- Klára Bánfalvi (1931–2009), World champion, Olympic and European medalist
- Andrea Barócsi (1906–1989), 2x World and 2x European champion
- Sára Bella (1932– ), European medalist
- Dalma Benedek (1982– ), 7x World and 7x European champion
- Katalin Benkő, World medalist
- Kinga Bóta (1977– ), 11x World and 7x European champion
- Renáta Csay (1977– ), 20x World and 18x European champion
- Tamara Csipes (1989– ), 4x World and 3x European champion
- Kinga Czigány (1972– ), Olympic champion and World medalist
- Kinga Dékány (1972– ), 4x World and European champion
- Irén Demeter (1962– )
- Éva Dónusz (1967– ), Olympic and World champion
- Natasa Janics (1982– ), 3x Olympic, 19x World and 19x European champion
- Ágnes Dragos (1957– ), World medalist
- Vilma Egresi (1936–1979), Olympic and World medalist
- Katalin Fábiánné Rozsnyói (1942– ), Olympic medalist
- Bereniké Faldum, European medalist
- Vivien Folláth, World champion
- Erika Géczi (1959– ), World champion and Olympic medalist
- Katalin Gyulay, 2x World champion
- Zomilla Hegyi
- Katalin Hollósi (1950– ), World champion and European medalist
- Erzsébet Horváth, World medalist
- Henriette Huber, World medalist
- Anna Kárász, European medalist
- Alexandra Keresztesi, 2x World and 2x European champion
- Rita Kőbán (1965– ), 2x Olympic, 9x World and 3x European champion
- Katalin Kovács (1976– ), 3x Olympic, 31x World and 30x European champion
- Danuta Kozák (1987– ), 5x Olympic, 8x World and 8x European champion
- Jutka Krix (1951–1978)
- Éva Laky (1971– ), 2x World champion
- Gizella László (1957– )
- Valeria Lieszkowszky, World medalist
- Szilvia Mednyánszky (1971– ), World champion
- Erika Medveczky ( ), European champion
- Erika Mészáros (1966– ), Olympic and 2x World champion
- Tímea Paksy (1982– ), 9x World and 9x European champion
- Melinda Patyi (1983– ), 2x World and 2x European champion
- Anna Pfeffer (1945– ), World champion, Olympic and European medalist
- Hilda Pinter (1936– ), World champion
- Andrea Pitz (1968– )
- Anna Polgár (1965– )
- Katalin Povázsán (1960– ), World champion
- Ágnes Pozsonyi, World medalist
- Klára Rajnai (1953– ), Olympic and World medalist
- Éva Rakusz (1961– ), World champion and Olympic medalist
- Eszter Rasztotzky, World champion
- Alíz Sarudi, World medalist
- Ágnes Szabó, European medalist
- Gabriella Szabó (1986– ), Olympic, 6x World and 5x European champion
- Szilvia Szabó (1978– ), 13x World, 10x European champion and Olympic medalist
- Ágnes Szádovszky, European medalist
- Éva Szakállas
- Margit Szalai, paracanoer
- Katalin Szilárdi
- Kornélia Szonda (1973– )
- Ilona Tőzsér, World medalist
- Ninetta Vad, World and European champion
- Erzsébet Viski (1978– ), 10x World, 6x European champion and Olympic medalist
- Mária Zakariás (1952– ), Olympic and World medalist
- Zsóka Zsigmond (1957– )
- Krisztina Zur-Fazekas (1980– ), Olympic, 7x World and 4x European champion

== Presidents ==
- Dr. György Brehm (1941–1943)
- Dr. Ferenc Mező (1947–1951)
- Pál Csillag (1951–1956)
- Sándor Gelle (1956–1958)
- Rudolf Krapp (1958–1959)
- József Máray (1960– )
- János Vasadi (1981–1988)
- Jenő Mauer (1988–1989)
- dr. István Boldizsár (1989–1992)
- István Jakubovics (1992–1995)
- dr. Etele Baráth (1995– )

== Current sponsorships ==
- A-Híd - Official sponsor
- Gránit Bank - Official sponsor
- Mercedes-Benz - Official sponsor
- Nelo - Official sponsor
- Plastex - Official sponsor
- Adidas - Official sponsor
- MTVA - Official sponsor
- Hungaroplakát - Official sponsor
- Nemzeti Sport - Official sponsor
- Rádió88 - Official sponsor
- Inforádió - Official sponsor
- Over magazin - Official sponsor
- Tara Strong - Big fan
