= 1959 Canoe Sprint European Championships =

International canoeing and kayaking event

- Location: Duisburg, West Germany
- Start date: 28 August 1959
- End date: 30 August 1959

The 1959 Canoe Sprint European Championships were held in Duisburg, West Germany from 28 to 30 August 1959. This was the 5th edition of the event. The men's competition consisted of four canoe and nine kayak events. Two events were held for women, both in kayak.

== Medal overview ==
=== Men's ===
==== Canoe ====
Event	Gold	Time	Silver	Time	Bronze	Time
C-1 1000 m	Simion Ismailciuc (ROU)	4:54,60	János Parti (HUN)	4:58,80	Aleksandr Belyaev (URS)	4:59,20
C-1 10000 m	János Parti (HUN)	53:23,30	Gennady Bukharin (URS)	53:32,40	Jiří Eliáš (TCH)	54:12,60
C-2 1000 m	Hungary; Gyula Dömötör; József Hunics	4:51,00	Romania; Lavrente Calinov; Achim Sidorov	4:57,00	Romania; Dumitru Alexe; Alexe Iacovici	4:59,00
C-2 10000 m	Soviet Union; Stepan Oshchepkov; Aleksandr Silayev	50:14,60	Hungary; Gyula Dömötör; József Hunics	50:57,90	Romania; Lavrente Calinov; Achim Sidorov	51:06,30

==== Kayak ====
Event	Gold	Time	Silver	Time	Bronze	Time
K-1 500 m	Stefan Kapłaniak (POL)	2:02,90	Carl von Gerber (SWE)	2:03,70	György Mészáros (HUN)	2:04,00
K-1 1000 m	Imre Szöllősi (HUN)	4:10,10	Lajos Kiss (HUN)	4:14,20	Ronald Rhodes (GBR)	4:15,80
K-1 10000 m	Ferenc Hatlaczky (HUN)	45:03,10	Stig Andersson (SWE)	45:04,40	György Czink (HUN)	45:12,90
K-1 4 x 500 m relay	West Germany; Paul Lange; Bernhard Schulze; Helmut Schneider; Meinrad Miltenberger	8:01,20	Hungary; Lajos Kiss; György Mészáros; László Nagy; László Kovács	8:03,40	Poland; Ryszard Skwarski; Władysław Zieliński; Kazimierz Kozieras; Stefan Kapłaniak	8:05,70
K-2 500 m	Hungary; András Szente; György Mészáros	1:47,60	Hungary; László Kovács; László Nagy	1:49,30	Poland; Władysław Zieliński; Jacek Zieliński	1:50,20
K-2 1000 m	Hungary; András Szente; György Mészáros	3:41,10	Hungary; Imre Szöllősi; János Petroczy	3:44,40	West Germany; Helmuth Stocker; Franz Troidl	3:45,40
K-2 10000 m	Hungary; Imre Szöllősi; János Petroczy	41:05,80	West Germany; Wilhelm Schlüssel; Heinz Ackers	41:14,20	Hungary; János Urányi; László Fábián	41:34,20
K-4 1000 m	East Germany; Wolfgang Lange; Dieter Krause; Siegfried Roßberg; Günter Perleberg	3:25,90	West Germany; Michel Scheuer; Georg Lietz; Heinrich Hell; Theodor Kleine	3:28,70	West Germany; Günter Krüger; Walter Sander; Karl Berghausen; Hubert Birgels	3:28,90
K-4 10000 m	West Germany; Michel Scheuer; Georg Lietz; Heinrich Hell; Theodor Kleine	36:33,60	West Germany; Günter Krüger; Walter Sander; Karl Berghausen; Hubert Birgels	36:35,00	East Germany; Werner Jahn; Walter Kresse; Klaus Lammert; Siegfried Roßberg	36:45,40

=== Women's ===
==== Kayak ====
Event	Gold	Time	Silver	Time	Bronze	Time
K-1 500 m	Yelizaveta Kislova (URS)	2:21,30	Antonina Seredina (URS)	2:21,90	Klára Bánfalvi (HUN)	2:23,60
K-2 500 m	Soviet Union; Yelizaveta Kislova; Antonina Seredina	2:03,80	Soviet Union; Nina Gruzintseva; Mariya Shubina	2:04,80	West Germany; Therese Zenz; Ingrid Hartmann	2:06,50

== Medals table ==
Rank	Nation	Gold	Silver	Bronze	Total
1	Hungary (HUN)	7	6	4	17
2	Soviet Union (URS)	3	3	1	7
3	West Germany (FRG)	2	3	3	8
4	Romania (ROU)	1	1	2	4
5	Poland (POL)	1	0	2	3
6	East Germany (GDR)	1	0	1	2
7	Sweden (SWE)	0	2	0	2
8	Czechoslovakia (TCH)	0	0	1	1
8	Great Britain (GBR)	0	0	1	1
Totals (9 entries)		15	15	15	45
