= 1957 Canoe Sprint European Championships =

International canoeing and kayaking event

- Location: Ghent, Belgium
- Start date: 23 August 1957
- End date: 25 August 1957

The 1957 Canoe Sprint European Championships were held in Ghent, Belgium from 23 to 25 August 1957. This was the 4th edition of the event. The men's competition consisted of four canoe and nine kayak events. Two events were held for women, both in kayak.

== Medal overview ==
=== Men's ===
==== Canoe ====
Event	Gold	Time	Silver	Time	Bronze	Time
C-1 1000 m	Gábor Novák (HUN)	4:49,40	Gennady Bukharin (URS)	4:50,50	Yuri Zhukovsky (URS)	4:50,90
C-1 10000 m	János Parti (HUN)	65:13,00	Gennady Bukharin (URS)	65:56,00	Werner Tschaschke (FRG)	67:08,00
C-2 1000 m	Soviet Union; Aleksandr Silayev; Pavel Kharin	4:25,90	Romania; Dumitru Alexe; Simion Ismailciuc	4:26,00	Hungary; Imre Farkas; József Hunics	4:27,00
C-2 10000 m	Romania; Dumitru Alexe; Simion Ismailciuc	59:19,00	Soviet Union; Aleksandr Silayev; Pavel Kharin	59:23,00	Romania; Igor Lipalit; Lavrente Calinov	60:05,00

==== Kayak ====
Event	Gold	Time	Silver	Time	Bronze	Time
K-1 500 m	Valentin Naumov (URS)	1:52,70	Aleksandr Markovtsev (URS)	1:53,60	Stefan Kapłaniak (POL)	1:54,30
K-1 1000 m	Valentin Naumov (URS)	3:57,30	Fritz Briel (FRG)	3:59,10	Villy Christiansen (DEN)	4:01,00
K-1 10000 m	Fritz Briel (FRG)	50:34,00	Heinz Ackers (FRG)	50:49,00	Igor Pisarev (URS)	52:30,00
K-1 4 x 500 m relay	Soviet Union; Valentin Naumov; Yevgeny Yatsinenko; Aleksandr Markovtsev; Igor Pisarev	8:10,70	West Germany; Georg Lietz; Paul Lange; Gustav Schmidt; Meinrad Miltenberger	8:19,20	Hungary; Dezső Veréb; János Petroczy; György Mészáros; Lajos Kiss	8:21,10
K-2 500 m	Hungary; János Urányi; László Fábián	1:41,00	West Germany; Meinrad Miltenberger; Gustav Schmidt	1:42,10	Romania; Mircea Anastasescu; Stavru Teodorov	1:42,40
K-2 1000 m	West Germany; Fritz Briel; Heinz Ackers	3:36,50	Denmark; Villy Christiansen; Vagn Schmidt	3:38,70	Soviet Union; Mikhail Kaaleste; Anatoly Demitkov	3:38,80
K-2 10000 m	Soviet Union; Mikhail Kaaleste; Anatoly Demitkov	46:02,00	Hungary; János Urányi; László Fábián	46:03,00	Belgium; Hendrik Verbrugghe; Germain Van der Moere	46:28,00
K-4 1000 m	Soviet Union; Alfonsas Rudzinskas; Volodar Zvyozdkin; Mykolas Rudzinskas; Vasiliy Stepanov	3:16,40	Soviet Union; Viktor Shadrin; Pavel Dubinin; Konstantin Nazarov; Igor Feoktistov	3:17,50	West Germany; Fritz Briel; Heinz Ackers; Wilhelm Schlüssel; Josef Knell	3:20,50
K-4 10000 m	West Germany; Michel Scheuer; Gustav Schmidt; Georg Lietz; Theodor Kleine	38:42,00	Soviet Union; Alfonsas Rudzinskas; Volodar Zvyozdkin; Mykolas Rudzinskas; Vasiliy Stepanov	39:06,60	Soviet Union; Viktor Shadrin; Pavel Dubinin; Konstantin Nazarov; Igor Feoktistov	39:28,00

=== Women's ===
==== Kayak ====
Event	Gold	Time	Silver	Time	Bronze	Time
K-1 500 m	Yelizaveta Dementyeva (URS)	2:05,70	Therese Zenz (FRG)	2:07,30	Nina Konistiapina (URS)	2:10,30
K-2 500 m	Soviet Union; Nina Gruzintseva; Nina Konistiapina	1:57,80	West Germany; Therese Zenz; Ingrid Hartmann	1:57,90	West Germany; Ruth Rohrbach; Sigrid Nowinski	1:59,00

== Medals table ==
Rank	Nation	Gold	Silver	Bronze	Total
1	Soviet Union (URS)	8	6	5	19
2	West Germany (FRG)	3	6	3	12
3	Hungary (HUN)	3	1	2	6
4	Romania (ROU)	1	1	2	4
5	Denmark (DEN)	0	1	1	2
6	Belgium (BEL)	0	0	1	1
6	Poland (POL)	0	0	1	1
Totals (7 entries)		15	15	15	45
