= Canoeing at the 1960 Summer Olympics – Men's C-2 1000 metres =

The men's C-2 1000 metres event was an open-style, pairs canoeing event conducted as part of the Canoeing at the 1960 Summer Olympics program on Lake Albano.

== Medalists ==
Gold	Silver	Bronze
Leonid Geishtor and Sergei Makarenko (URS)	Aldo Dezi and Francesco La Macchia (ITA)	Imre Farkas and András Törő (HUN)

== Results ==
=== Heats ===
Eleven teams first raced in two heats on August 26. The top three finishers from each heat advanced directly to the final, and the remaining five teams were relegated to the repechage.

Heat 1
1.	Leonid Geishtor and Sergei Makarenko (URS)	4:27.29	QF
2.	Aldo Dezi and Francesco La Macchia (ITA)	4:29.24	QF
3.	Igor Lipalit and Alexe Dumitru (ROU)	4:31.33	QF
4.	Jiří Kodeš and Václav Vokál (TCH)	4:38.59	QR
5.	Willi Mehlberg and Werner Ulrich (EUA)	4:39.44	QR
6.	Marin Gopov and Toma Sokolov (BUL)	4:39.68	QR
Heat 2
1.	Imre Farkas and András Törő (HUN)	4:29.42	QF
2.	Georges Turlier and Michel Picard (FRA)	4:29.76	QF
3.	Kurt Liebhart and Herwig Dirnböck (AUT)	4:42.43	QF
4.	John Beedell and Joseph Derochie (CAN)	4:47.82	QR
5.	Arnold Demos and Richard Moran (USA)	4:59.15	QR

=== Repechage ===
The top three finishers in the repechage (raced on August 27) advanced to the final, while the rest were eliminated.

1.	Jiří Kodeš and Václav Vokál (TCH)	4:44.20	QF
2.	Marin Gopov and Toma Sokolov (BUL)	4:48.06	QF
3.	Willi Mehlberg and Werner Ulrich (EUA)	4:50.23	QF
4.	John Beedell and Joseph Derochie (CAN)	5:02.14
-	Arnold Demos and Richard Moran (USA)	5:03.83	DQ

The American team was disqualified for reasons not disclosed in the official report.

=== Final ===
The final was held on August 29.

Gold	Leonid Geishtor and Sergei Makarenko (URS)	4:17.04
Silver	Aldo Dezi and Francesco La Macchia (ITA)	4:20.77
Bronze	Imre Farkas and András Törő (HUN)	4:20.89
4.	Igor Lipalit and Alexe Dumitru (ROU)	4:22.36
5.	Jiří Kodeš and Václav Vokál (TCH)	4:27.66
6.	Marin Gopov and Toma Sokolov (BUL)	4:31.52
7.	Willi Mehlberg and Werner Ulrich (EUA)	4:31.68
8.	Georges Turlier and Michel Picard (FRA)	4:35.48
9.	Kurt Liebhart and Herwig Dirnböck (AUT)	4:43.70

Bulgaria's time was not listed in the official report, but it was found in Wallechinsky and Loucky's reference, which is shown below.
