= Halmay =

Halmay is a surname. Notable people with the surname include:

- Gyula Halmay (1910–death unknown), Hungarian rower
- József Halmay, Hungarian sprint canoeist
- Tibor Halmay (1894–1944), Hungarian stage and film actor
- Zoltán Halmay (1881–1956), Hungarian Olympic swimmer

== See also ==
- Halme
