= Gieysztor =

Gieysztor, Geysztor is a Polish noble family name. The surname may be Russified to Geishtor or Geyshtor. It may refer to:

- Aleksander Gieysztor (1916–1999), Polish medievalist historian
- Jakób Gieysztor (pl:Jakub Gieysztor)

== See also ==
- Giejsz
