= Derochie =

Derochie is a surname. Notable people with the surname include:

- Angela Derochie (born 1973), Canadian competitive figure skater
- Darren Derochie (born 1966), Canadian cross-country skier
- Joseph Derochie (born 1939), Canadian sprint canoer
