= Harald Eriksen =

Harald Eriksen is the name of:

- Harald Eriksen (gymnast) (1888–1968), Norwegian gymnast
- Harald Eriksen (canoeist), Norwegian sprint canoer

== See also ==
- Harald Eriksson (1921–2015), Swedish cross-country skier
- Hal Erickson (disambiguation)
