= Ljung (surname) =

Ljung is a surname of Swedish origin. Notable people with the surname include:

- Axel Ljung (1884–1938), Swedish gymnast who competed in the 1908 Summer Olympics
- Carl-Åke Ljung (1934–2023), Swedish sprint canoer
- Eva Lisa Ljung (born 1970), Swedish pageant titleholder
- Greta M. Ljung (born 1941), Finnish-American statistician
- Jesper Ljung (born 1973), Swedish footballer and manager
- Kim Ljung (born 1971), Norwegian musician
- Lennart Ljung (engineer) (born 1946), Swedish academic
- Lennart Ljung (general) (1921–1990), Swedish Army general
- Martin Ljung (1917–2010), Swedish comedian, actor and singer
- Oscar Ljung (1909–1999), Swedish film actor
- Ove Ljung (1918–1997), Swedish Army general
- Peter Ljung (speedway rider) (born 1982), Swedish motorcycle speedway rider
- Peter Ljung (bowler) (born 1977), Swedish ten-pin bowler
- Roger Ljung (born 1966), Swedish footballer
- Viktor Ljung (born 1991), Swedish footballer

== Fictional characters ==
- Bert Ljung
