= Dezi (disambiguation) =

Dezi may refer to:

- Dezi- (or Deci-; symbol d), a decimal unit prefix in the metric system denoting a factor of one tenth

People

- Aldo Dezi (born 1939), Italian former sprint canoer
- Jacopo Dezi (born 1992), Italian footballer
- Dezi Arnaz (1917-1986), Cuban-born American actor, musician, and television producer
