= Heurlin =

Heurlin or Hörlin is a Swedish surname. Notable people with the surname include:

- Magnus Colcord Heurlin (1895–1986), Swedish-American artist
- Ragnar Heurlin (1928–2013), Swedish sprint canoer
