= Gustav Schmidt =

Gustav Schmidt may refer to:

- Gustav Schmidt (general) (1894–1943), German military officer, lieutenant general in World War II
- Gustav Schmidt (canoeist) (1926–2016), German canoeist
- Gustav Schmidt (composer) (1816–1882), German composer, see Philharmonisches Staatsorchester Mainz
