= Carl Sundin =

Swedish canoeist (1930–2026)

Medal record

Men's canoe sprint

World Championships
Silver medal – second place	1954 Mâcon	K-4 10000 m

Carl Axel Gunnar Sundin (8 September 1930 – 14 September 2026) was a Swedish sprint canoeist who competed in the mid-1950s. He won a silver medal in the K-4 10000 m event at the 1954 ICF Canoe Sprint World Championships in Mâcon.

Sundin also finished fourth in the K-2 10000 m event at the 1956 Summer Olympics in Melbourne.

Sundin died on 14 September 2026, six days after his 96th birthday.

== Sources ==
- Sports-reference.com profile
