= Helmut Herz =

German canoeist

Medal record

Men's canoe sprint

World Championships
Gold medal – first place	1958 Prague	K-1 4 x 500 m

Helmut Herz is a West German sprint canoer who competed in the late 1950s. He won a gold medal in the K-1 4 x 500 m event at the 1958 ICF Canoe Sprint World Championships in Prague.
