= Igor Feoktistov =

Soviet sprint canoeist (1928–2013)

Medal record

Men's canoe sprint

European Championships
Silver medal – second place	1957 Ghent	K-4 1000 m
Bronze medal – third place	1957 Ghent	K-4 10000 m

Igor Feoktistov (Russian: Игорь Феоктистов; 31 July 1928 – 2013) was a Soviet sprint canoeist who competed in the 1950s. He finished tenth in the K-2 10000 m event at the 1952 Summer Olympics in Helsinki.
