= Hal Erickson =

Hal Erickson may refer to:

- Hal Erickson (American football) (1898–1963), American football player
- Hal Erickson (baseball) (1919–2008), Major League Baseball pitcher for the Detroit Tigers
- Hal Erickson (author) (born 1950), American media historian

== See also ==
- Harald Eriksen (disambiguation)
