= Jiří Vokněr =

Czechoslovak sprint canoer

Medal record

Men's canoe sprint

World Championships
Gold medal – first place	1954 Mâcon	C-1 10000 m
Silver medal – second place	1958 Prague	C-1 1000 m
Silver medal – second place	1958 Prague	C-1 10000 m

Jiří Vokněr (12 May 1931 – 29 May 2018) is a Czechoslovak sprint canoer who competed in the mid to late 1950s. He won three medals at the ICF Canoe Sprint World Championships with one gold (1954: C-1 10000 m) and two silvers (1958: C-1 1000 m, C-1 10000 m).

Vokněr also finished fourth in the C-1 10000 m event at the 1956 Summer Olympics in Melbourne.
