= Sergei Makarenko =

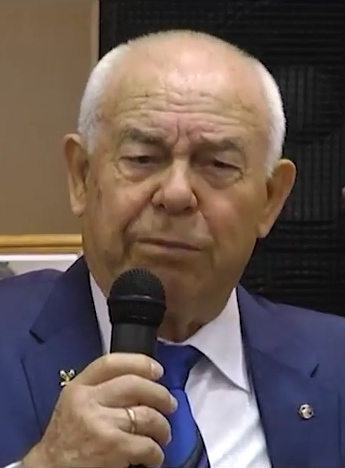
- Makarenko in 2017

Personal information
- Born: Сергей Лаврентьевич Макаренко; Сергій Лаврентійович Макаренко; 11 September 1937 (age 88) Kryvyi Rih, Ukrainian SSR, Soviet Union
- Height: 1.71 m (5 ft 7 in)
- Weight: 70 kg (154 lb)

Sport
- Sport: Canoe sprint
- Club: Spartak Brest
Medal record
Representing the Soviet Union
Olympic Games
Gold medal – first place	1960 Rome	C-2 1000 m
World Championships
Gold medal – first place	1963 Jajce	C-2 10000 m

Sergei Lavrentyevich Makarenko (born 11 September 1937) is a retired Soviet sprint canoeist who competed from the late 1950s to the early 1960s. Together with Leonid Geishtor he won the C-2 1,000 m event at the 1960 Olympics and the 1963 World Championships.

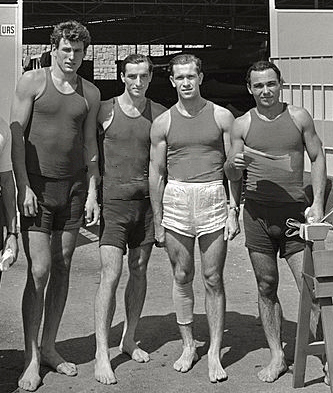
Makarenko (2nd from right) at the 1960 Olympics
