= Michel Picard (canoeist) =

French sprint canoer (born 1934)

Michel Picard (December 4, 1934 – March 13, 1999) was a French sprint canoer who competed in the early 1960s. Competing alongside Georges Turlier, he finished eighth in the C-2 1000 m event at the 1960 Summer Olympics in Rome. Picard was scheduled to compete in the C-1 1000 m event at those same games, but withdrew prior to the heats.
