= Nichifor Tarara =

Romanian sprint canoer (born 1936)

Medal record

Men's Canoe sprint

World Championships
| Bronze medal – third place | 1958 Prague | C-1 10000 m |

Nichifor Tarara (born 12 March 1936) is a Romanian sprint canoer who competed in the late 1950s. He won a bronze medal in the C-1 10000 m event at the 1958 ICF Canoe Sprint World Championships in Prague. He also competed in the men's coxless four rowing event at the 1964 Summer Olympics.
