= Robert Smith (canoeist) =

Canadian canoeist

Robert Carlisle Smith (April 11, 1929 – August 2, 2001) was a Canadian sprint canoer who competed in the late 1950s. At the 1956 Summer Olympics in Melbourne, he was eliminated in the heats both of the K-1 1000 m and the K-2 1000 m events.
