= Zdeněk Ziegler (canoeist) =

Czechoslovak canoeist (1926–2022)

Medal record

Men's canoe sprint

Representing Czechoslovakia

World Championships
Bronze medal – third place	1954 Mâcon	C-2 10000 m

Zdeněk Ziegler (20 July 1926 – 6 May 2022) was a Czechoslovak sprint canoer who competed in the mid-1950s. He won a bronze medal in the C-2 10000 m event at the 1954 ICF Canoe Sprint World Championships in Mâcon. "In 1953, as a canoeist, I won the title of master of sports and I started riding in pairs with my colleague Sieger. However, he was a little younger and worked in the war and then the ÚDA Prague, the successor to ATK, and so that we could train together I became a civilian employee of the army." The last matches that he played were for ÚDA Prague in 1954–55. He rowed two kilometers a day every day in his town Holoubkov until his death.
