= Lisa Schwarz =

Medal record

Women's canoe sprint

World Championships
Bronze medal – third place	1954 Mâcon	K-2 500 m

Lisa Schwarz is a West German canoe sprinter who competed in the mid-1950s. She won a bronze medal in the K-2 500 m event at the 1954 ICF Canoe Sprint World Championships in Mâcon.
