= Richard Moran (canoeist) =

American sprint canoer (born 1932)

Richard Moran (November 22, 1932 – June 14, 1989) was an American sprint canoer who competed in the late 1950s and the early 1960s. At the 1956 Summer Olympics in Melbourne, he was eliminated in the heats of the C-2 1000 m event. Four years later in Rome, Moran was disqualified in the repechage round of the C-2 1000 m event.
