= Lajos Bodnar =

Hungarian sprint canoer

Medal record

Men's canoe sprint

World Championships
Silver medal – second place	1958 Prague	C-2 1000 m

Lajos Bodnar was a Hungarian sprint canoer who competed in the late 1950s. He won the silver medal in the C-2 1000 m event at the 1958 ICF Canoe Sprint World Championships in Prague.
