= Franz Teidl =

Medal record

Men's canoe sprint

World Championships
Bronze medal – third place	1958 Prague	K-2 10000 m

Franz Teidl is a West German sprint canoer who competed in the late 1950s. He won a bronze medal in the K-2 10000 m event at the 1958 ICF Canoe Sprint World Championships in Prague.
