= Ernst Steinhauer =

German canoeist

Medal record

Men's canoe sprint

World Championships
Gold medal – first place	1954 Mâcon	K-2 500 m
Bronze medal – third place	1954 Mâcon	K-2 10000 m

Ernst Steinhauer (9 December 1925 – 8 November 2005) was a West German sprint canoer who competed in the mid to late 1950s. He won two medals at the 1954 ICF Canoe Sprint World Championships in Mâcon with a gold in the K-2 500 m and a bronze in the K-2 10000 m events.

Steinhauer competed for the United Team of Germany at the 1956 Summer Olympics in Melbourne, finishing eighth in the K-1 1000 m event.
