= John Beedell =

Canadian canoeist

- Born: February 14, 1933; New Zealand
- Died: December 18, 2014 (aged 81); Ottawa
- Education: Queen's University (non-graduate)
- Spouse: Ann
- Children: Michael, David and Jeffery

John Beedell (February 14, 1933 – December 18, 2014) was a New Zealand-born, Canadian sprint canoer who competed in the late 1950s into the early 1960s. He competed for Canada at the 1958 ICF Canoe Sprint World Championships in Prague and at the 1960 Summer Olympics in Rome. He was eliminated, along with his doubles partner Joseph Derochie, in the repechage round of the Men's C-2 1000 metres event at 1960 Olympics.

Beedell spent his early childhood in New Zealand, England, and British Guyana. In British Guyana he contracted malaria and was sent to live in Canada while recovering. His family joined him in Canada in 1941, and Beedell lived there for the rest of his life. He attended Queen's University but dropped out after his first year in the engineering program. He was married in 1955. He and his wife Ann had three children: Michael, born in 1956; Jeffrey, born in 1958; and David, born in 1961.

Beedell trained in Sudbury, Ontario as a runner and competitive canoer during this period, while holding a full-time job and helping to raise a family and made the 1958 World Championship and 1960 Olympic teams.

After the Olympics, Beedell completed his teaching degree and became a science teacher at Ashbury College in Ottawa. He also contributed to outdoor education by serving as director of the Ontario Camp Leadership Centre. He was an avid skier and runner, competing in more than 20 marathons around the world. In 1988 he suffered a serious brain injury as the result of a fall, which curtailed his physical and outdoor activities. He died in 2014, at the age of 81, after being struck by a school bus in the New Edinburgh neighbourhood of Ottawa.
