= Günter Krammer =

Medal record

Men's canoe sprint

World Championships
Bronze medal – third place	1954 Mâcon	K-2 1000 m

Günter Krammer is a West German sprint canoeist who competed in the mid-1950s. He won a bronze medal in the K-2 1000 m event at the 1954 ICF Canoe Sprint World Championships in Mâcon.
