= Marin Gopov =

Bulgarian canoeist (born 1939)

Marin Gopov (Bulgarian: Марин Гопов; born April 20, 1939) is a Bulgarian sprint canoer who competed in the early 1960s. Paired with Toma Sokolov, he finished sixth in the C-2 1000 m event at the 1960 Summer Olympics in Rome.
