= David Merwin =

American canoeist (1936–1960)

David Merwin (August 17, 1936 – July 3, 1960) was an American sprint canoer who competed in the late 1950s. He was eliminated in the heats of the K-1 1000 m event at the 1956 Summer Olympics in Melbourne. Sixteen competitors entered, but only 13 took part. Those 13 raced in three heats. The top finishers in each heat moved to the finals. Merwin placed fourth in heat 3 at 4:35.9 and was eliminated, but his time was better than that of the third place qualifier in Heat 2, who came in at 4:39.9.

Merwin was from Canton, Ohio, and had a sister. He graduated from Phillips Exeter Academy in New Hampshire in 1954. Merwin was a member of the Alpha Tau Omega fraternity at Cornell University in Ithaca, NY, where he was also a member of the university's crew. When the Cornell crew did not qualify for the 1956 Olympics, he sought to qualify individually. While at Cornell, he planned to become an Episcopal priest. He graduated in 1958, but, while training for the 1960 Olympics, died in an automobile accident near Greenville, Pennsylvania, July 3, 1960 while returning from a vacation in Canada with a friend.
