= Georges Turlier =

French canoeist

Olympic medal record

Men's canoe sprint

Representing France
| Gold medal – first place | 1952 Helsinki | C-2 10000 m |

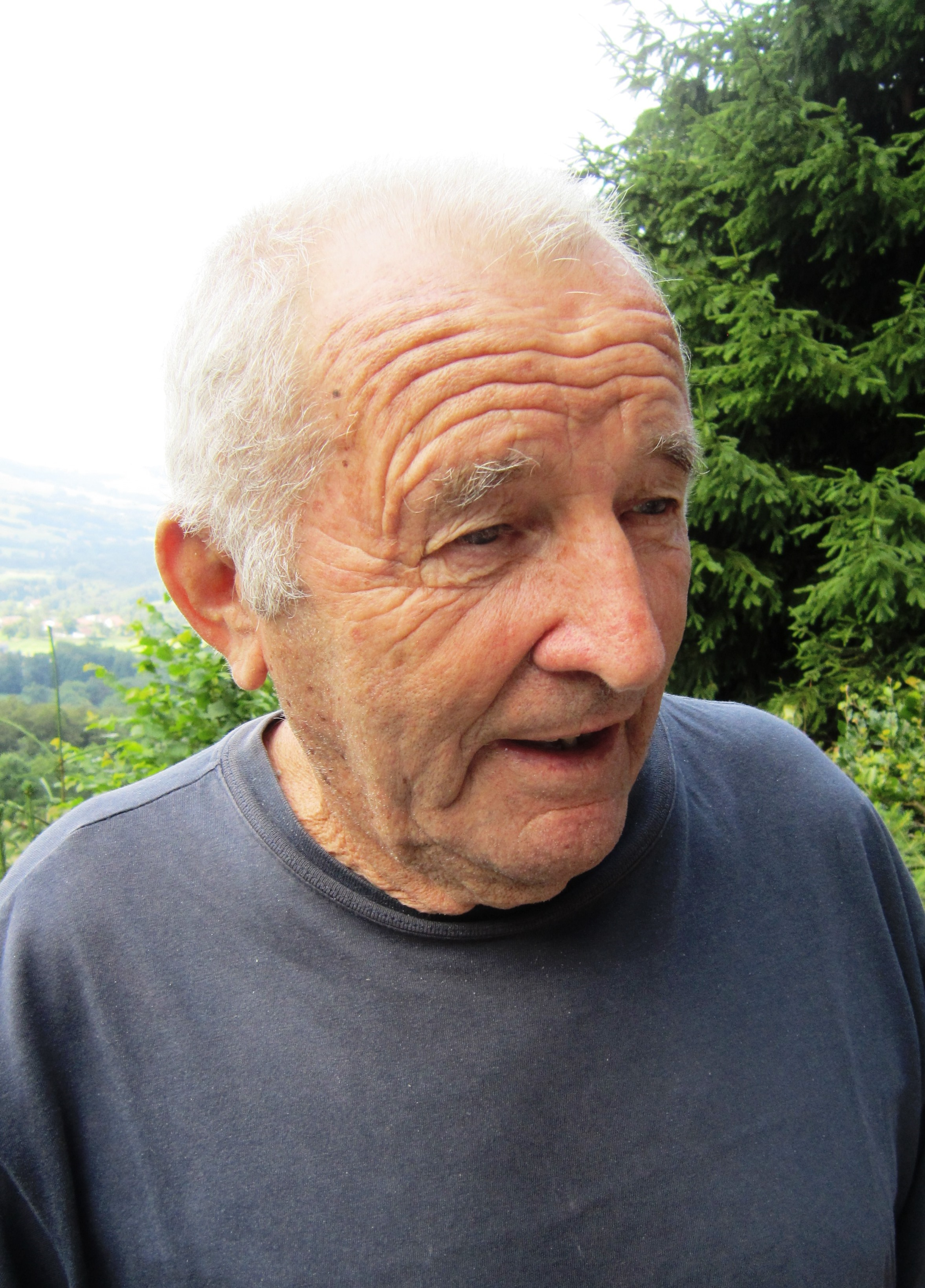
Turlier in 2016

Georges Turlier (born 16 July 1931) is a French sprint canoer who competed from the early 1950s to the early 1960s. Competing in two Summer Olympics, he won a gold medal in the C-2 10000 m event at Helsinki in 1952.

Competing alongside Michel Picard, Turlier finished eighth in the C-2 1000 m event at the 1960 Summer Olympics in Rome.
