= Toma Sokolov =

Bulgarian canoeist

Toma Sokolov (Bulgarian: Тома Соколов) (November 6, 1938 – December 21, 2011) was a Bulgarian sprint canoer who competed in the early 1960s. Paired with Marin Gopov, he finished sixth in the C-2 1000 m event at the 1960 Summer Olympics in Rome.
