= Herwig Dirnböck =

Austrian canoeist

Herwig Dirnböck (Vienna, 23 November 1935) is an Austrian sprint canoeist who competed in the early 1960s. Paired with Kurt Liebhart, he finished ninth in the C-2 1000 m event at the 1960 Summer Olympics in Rome.
