= Henri Lindelöf =

Swedish canoeist

Medal record

Men's canoe sprint

World Championships
Bronze medal – third place	1958 Prague	K-1 4 x 500 m

Henri Lindelöf is a Swedish sprint canoer who competed in the late 1950s. He won a bronze medal in the K-1 4 x 500 m event at the 1958 ICF Canoe Sprint World Championships in Prague.
