= Canoeing at the 1956 Summer Olympics – Men's K-1 1000 metres =

The men's K-1 1000 metres was a competition in canoeing at the 1956 Summer Olympics. The K-1 event is raced by single-man canoe sprint kayaks. Heat and semifinals took place on December 1.

== Medalists ==
| Gold | Silver | Bronze |
| Gert Fredriksson (SWE) | Igor Pissarov (URS) | Lajos Kiss (HUN) |

== Heats ==
16 competitors entered, but 13 only took part. Those 13 competitors first raced in three heats. The top three finishers in each heat moved directly to the final.

Heat 1
| 1. | Gert Fredriksson (SWE) | 4:22.0 | QF |
| 2. | Igor Pissarov (URS) | 4:22.2 | QF |
| 3. | Ladislav Čepčianský (TCH) | 4:26.0 | QF |
| 4. | Knut Østby (NOR) | 4:27.1 |
| 5. | Thorvald Strömberg (FIN) | 4:51.3 |
| 6. | Robert Smith (CAN) | 4:54.2 |
Heat 2
| 1. | Stefan Kapłaniak (POL) | 4:35.4 | QF |
| 2. | Lajos Kiss (HUN) | 4:35.8 | QF |
| 3. | Louis Gantois (FRA) | 4:39.9 | QF |
Heat 3
| 1. | Ernst Steinhauer (EUA) | 4:24.8 | QF |
| 2. | Villy Christiansen (DEN) | 4:25.2 | QF |
| 3. | Barry Stuart (AUS) | 4:30.1 | QF |
| 4. | David Merwin (USA) | 4:35.9 |

== Final ==
| Gold | Gert Fredriksson (SWE) | 4:12.8 |
| Silver | Igor Pissarov (URS) | 4:15.3 |
| Bronze | Lajos Kiss (HUN) | 4:16.2 |
| 4. | Stefan Kapłaniak (POL) | 4:19.8 |
| 5. | Louis Gantois (FRA) | 4:22.1 |
| 6. | Ladislav Čepčianský (TCH) | 4:23.2 |
| 7. | Villy Christiansen (DEN) | 4:25.2 |
| 8. | Ernst Steinhauer (EUA) | 4:25.5 |
| 9. | Barry Stuart (AUS) | 4:30.7 |
