= Jaroslav Sieger =

Czechoslovak sprint canoer

Medal record

Men's canoe sprint

World Championships
Bronze medal – third place	1954 Mâcon	C-2 10000 m

Jaroslav Sieger is a Czechoslovak sprint canoer who competed in the mid-1950s. He won a bronze medal in the C-2 10000 m event at the 1954 ICF Canoe Sprint World Championships in Mâcon.
