= Einar Pihl =

Swedish canoeist

Medal record

Men's canoe sprint

World Championships
Gold medal – first place	1950 Copenhagen	K-4 1000 m
Gold medal – first place	1954 Mâcon	K-4 10000 m
Silver medal – second place	1954 Mâcon	K-4 1000 m

Einar Pihl (1926/1927 – 2009) was a Swedish sprint canoeist who competed in the early to mid-1950s. He won three medals at the ICF Canoe Sprint World Championships with two golds (K-4 1000 m: 1950, K-4 10000 m: 1954) and a silver (K-4 1000 m: 1954).
