= Robert Enteric =

French sprint canoer

Medal record

Men's canoe sprint

World Championships
Bronze medal – third place	1954 Mâcon	K-4 1000 m

Robert Enteric was a French sprint canoer who competed in the mid-1950s. He won a bronze medal in the K-4 1000 m event at the 1954 ICF Canoe Sprint World Championships at Mâcon.
