= Arnold Demos =

American sprint canoer (born 1936)

Arnold Demos (born September 8, 1936 in Boston) is an American sprint canoer who competed in the early 1960s. He was disqualified in the repechage round of the C-2 1000 m event at the 1960 Summer Olympics in Rome.
