= Sigvard Johansson =

Swedish canoeist

Medal record

Men's canoe sprint

World Championships
Silver medal – second place	1954 Mâcon	K-2 10000 m
Silver medal – second place	1954 Mâcon	K-4 10000 m

Sigvard Johansson is a Swedish sprint canoer who competed in the mid-1950s. He won two silver medals at the 1954 ICF Canoe Sprint World Championships in Mâcon, earning them in the K-2 10000 m and K-4 10000 m events.
