= József Pehl =

Hungarian sprint canoer

Medal record

Men's canoe sprint

World Championships
Silver medal – second place	1958 Prague	K-4 1000 m

József Pehl(1932-2015) is a Hungarian sprint canoer who competed in the late 1950s. He won a silver medal in the K-4 1000 m event at the 1958 ICF Canoe Sprint World Championships in Prague.
