= Kurt Liebhart =

Austrian canoeist

Medal record

Men's canoe sprint

Representing Austria

World Championships
Gold medal – first place	1954 Mâcon	C-2 1000 m

Kurt Liebhart (Korneuburg, 22 August 1933 – Klosterneuburg, 11 January 2010) was an Austrian sprint canoer who competed in the 1950s. He won a gold medal in the C-2 1000 m event at the 1954 ICF Canoe Sprint World Championships in Mâcon.

Competing in two Summer Olympics, Liebhart earned his best finish of sixth in the C-2 1000 m event at Helsinki in 1952.

Paired with Herwig Dirnböck, he finished ninth in the C-2 1000 m event at the 1960 Summer Olympics in Rome.

He was the brother of Gertrude Liebhart and the nephew of Karl Molnar, both also Olympic canoeists representing Austria (at the 1952 and 1948 Summer Olympics respectively).
