= Ebbe Frick =

Swedish canoeist

Medal record

Men's canoe sprint

Representing Sweden

World Championships
Gold medal – first place	1954 Mâcon	K-4 10000 m
Silver medal – second place	1950 Copenhagen	K-4 1000 m
Silver medal – second place	1954 Mâcon	K-4 1000 m

Ebbe Frick is a Swedish sprint canoer who competed in the early to mid-1950s. He won three medals at the ICF Canoe Sprint World Championships with a gold (K-4 10000 m: 1954) and two silver (K-4 1000 m: 1950, 1954).
