= Joseph Derochie =

Canadian sprint canoer

Joseph Derochie (born July 25, 1939) is a Canadian sprint canoer who competed in the early 1960s. He was eliminated in the repechage round of the C-2 1000 m event, along with his doubles partner John Beedell, at the 1960 Summer Olympics in Rome.

His son is Darren Derochie, cross-country skier who competed in the 1992 Winter Games.
