= Bert Nilsson =

Swedish canoeist

Medal record

Men's canoe sprint

World Championships
Gold medal – first place	1954 Mâcon	K-1 4 x 500 m

Bert Nilsson is a Swedish sprint canoer who competed in the mid to late 1950s. He won a gold medal in the K-1 4 x 500 m event at the 1954 ICF Canoe Sprint World Championships in Mâcon.
