= Ladislav Čepčianský =

Czechoslovak canoeist (1931–2021)

Medal record

Men's canoe sprint

World Championships
Silver medal – second place	1958 Prague	K-1 10000 m

Ladislav Čepčianský (2 February 1931 – 2 October 2021) was a Czechoslovak sprint canoeist who competed from the late 1950s to the early 1960s. He won a silver medal in the K-1 10000 m event at the 1958 ICF Canoe Sprint World Championships in Prague. Čepčianský also competed in two Summer Olympics, earning his best finish of sixth at Melbourne in 1956 both in the K-1 1000 m and the K-1 10000 m events.
