= Jaroslav Poupa =

Medal record

Men's canoe sprint

World Championships
Bronze medal – third place	1954 Mâcon	C-1 1000 m

Jaroslav Poupa is a Czechoslovak sprint canoer who competed in the mid-1950s. He won a bronze medal in the C-1 1000 m event at the 1954 ICF Canoe Sprint World Championships in Mâcon, France.
