= Francesco La Macchia =

Italian canoeist

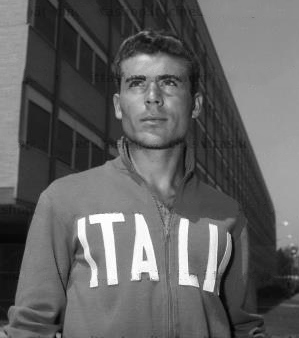

Personal information
- Born: 9 October 1938 Tonnarella, Messina, Italy
- Died: 31 July 2017 (aged 78)
- Height: 1.73 m (5 ft 8 in)
- Weight: 73 kg (161 lb)

Sport
- Sport: Canoe sprint
Medal record
Representing Italy
Olympic Games
Silver medal – second place	1960 Rome	C-2 1000 m

Francesco La Macchia (9 October 1938 – 31 July 2017) was an Italian canoe sprinter who won a C-2 1000 m silver medal at the 1960 Summer Olympics in Rome partnering with Aldo Dezi. The victory was Italy's first medal in canoeing.
