= Werner Ulrich (canoeist) =

East German sprint canoer (born 1940)

Medal record

Men's canoe sprint

World Championships
Silver medal – second place	1963 Jajce	C-2 10000 m

Werner Ulrich (born 18 September 1940) is a former East German sprint canoer who competed in the early 1960s. He was born in Memel, East Prussia (today Klaipėda, Lithuania) and won a silver medal in the C-2 10000 m event at the 1963 ICF Canoe Sprint World Championships in Jajce.

He also competed for the United Team of Germany at the 1960 Summer Olympics in Rome, where, paired with Willi Mehlberg, he finished seventh in the C-2 1000 m event.
