= Anatoliy Trozhenkov =

Russian canoeist

Medal record

Men's canoe sprint

World Championships
Bronze medal – third place	1958 Prague	K-4 1000 m

Anatoliy Trozhenkov (sometimes listed as Anatoly Troshenkov, 1930–1999) was a Soviet sprint canoer who competed in the 1950s. He won a bronze medal in the K-4 1000 m event at the 1958 ICF Canoe Sprint World Championships in Prague.

Trozhenkov also competed at the 1952 Summer Olympics in Helsinki in the K-2 1000 m event, but was eliminated in the heats.
