= Gisela Amail =

German canoeist

Medal record

Women's canoe sprint

World Championships
Bronze medal – third place	1954 Mâcon	K-2 500 m

Gisela Amail is a West German sprint canoer who competed in the mid-1950s. She won a bronze medal in the K-2 500 m event at the 1954 ICF Canoe Sprint World Championships in Mâcon.
