= Zoltán Szigeti =

Hungarian canoeist (1932–2009)

Medal record

Men's canoe sprint

World Championships
Gold medal – first place	1954 Mâcon	K-4 1000 m

Zoltán Szigeti (17 December 1932 – 12 May 2009) was a Hungarian canoe sprinter who competed in the mid to late 1950s. He won a gold medal in the K-4 1000 m event at the 1954 ICF Canoe Sprint World Championships in Mâcon. Szigeti competed in the K-2 1000 m event at the 1956 Summer Olympics in Melbourne, but was eliminated in the heats and did not advance to the final.
