= István Hernek =

Hungarian canoeist (1935–2014)

Medal record

Men's canoe sprint

Olympic Games
Silver medal – second place	1956 Melbourne	C-1 1000 m

World Championships
Silver medal – second place	1954 Mâcon	C-1 1000 m
Bronze medal – third place	1954 Mâcon	C-1 10000 m

István Hernek (23 April 1935 – 25 September 2014) was a Hungarian sprint canoer who competed in the mid-1950s. At the 1956 Summer Olympics in Melbourne, he won a silver medal in the C-1 1000 m event. Hernek also won two medals at the 1954 ICF Canoe Sprint World Championships with a silver in the C-1 1000 m and a bronze in the C-1 10000 m events.
