= Mihály Sasvári =

Hungarian canoeist (1932–2026)

Medal record

Men's canoe sprint

World Championships
Silver medal – second place	1954 Mâcon	C-2 10000 m
Bronze medal – third place	1954 Mâcon	C-2 1000 m

Mihály Sasvári (19 October 1932 – April 2026) was a Hungarian sprint canoeist who competed in the early 1950s. He won two medals at the 1954 ICF Canoe Sprint World Championships in Mâcon with a silver in the C-2 10000 m and a bronze in the C-2 1000 m events. Sasvári died in April 2026, at the age of 93.
