= Hilda Pinter =

Hungarian canoeist

Medal record

Women's canoe sprint

World Championships
Gold medal – first place	1954 Mâcon	K-2 500 m

Hilda Pintér is a Hungarian sprint canoer who competed in the mid-1950s. She won a gold medal in the K-2 500 m event at the 1954 ICF Canoe Sprint World Championships in Mâcon. She was born on September 14, 1933, in Budapest, Hungary. She left Hungary in 1956. She married in Basel, Switzerland in 1957 Franz Salamon, Dr.-Ing. (Franz A. Salamon, Ph.D., Dr.-Ing., Biography: born on February 8, 1932, in Budapest, Hungary. Father Austrian, mother Hungarian. Deported to Bavaria/Germany in 1944. Returned to Hungary with his parents in 1946. Maturity at the "Fazekas Mihàly Gimnazium" in Budapest in 1950. Diploma from the Budapesti Müszaki Egyetem as Mechanical Engineer in 1954. Electrical Engineer in 1956. Escaped from Hungary in November 1956 after the revolution. He married in Basel, Switzerland in June 1957, with Pintér Hilda, Kayak-2 world champion in 1954 in Macon, France. Worked in Switzerland from 1956 to 1960. Worked at SHELL in The Hague/The Netherlands from 1960 to 1962. Worked for Du Pont de Nemours in the US and in Europe from 1962 to 1990. Started as Technical Rep., followed as Techn. Manager, Product Mgr., Customer Service Mgr., Director of Corporate Planning, Corporate Waste Management. As employee of Du Pont, invented the "Fishtail Guide", for the waste free production of the Teflon PTFE unsintered tape. Developed the membrane of Teflon, known as Gore-Tex. Produced the first Fiber Optics as Crofon. From 1990, he is working as independent consultant. Chief executive officer of Dinatar S.A. in 1995 in Geneva. President and CEO of TEDE S.A./Zug/Switzerland in 2004. He lives in Geneva, Switzerland. He won the International Honda NSX Trophy in 2000, 2001, and 2002.) She gave birth to their son Jörg in Basel in 1958. She became Swiss in 1972. She won the K-1 Swiss Championship in 1968. Since 1979 she is living in Geneva, Switzerland.
