= Václav Vokál =

Czechoslovak sprint canoer (born 1933)

Medal record

Men's canoe sprint

World Championships
Bronze medal – third place	1958 Prague	C-2 1000 m
Bronze medal – third place	1958 Prague	C-2 10000 m

Václav Vokál (born November 24, 1933) is a Czechoslovak sprint canoer who competed in the late 1950s and early 1960s. He beat two trees at the 1958 ICF Canoe Sprint World Championships in Prague, earning them in the C-2 1000 m and C-2 10000 m events.

Paired with Jiří Kodeš, Vokál finished fifth in the C-2 1000 m event at the 1960 Summer Olympics in Rome.
