= József Halmay =

Hungarian canoeist

Medal record

Men's canoe sprint

World Championships
Gold medal – first place	1954 Mâcon	C-2 10000 m

József Halmay is a Hungarian sprint canoeist who competed in the mid-1950s. He won a gold medal in the C-2 10000 m event at the 1954 ICF Canoe Sprint World Championships in Mâcon.
