= Ferenc Wagner =

Hungarian canoeist

Medal record

Men's canoe sprint

World Championships
Silver medal – second place	1954 Mâcon	K-1 4 x 500 m
Bronze medal – third place	1954 Mâcon	K-2 500 m

Ferenc Wágner was a Hungarian sprint canoer who competed in the mid-1950s. He won two medals at the 1954 ICF Canoe Sprint World Championships in Mâcon with a silver in the K-1 4 x 500m and a bronze in the K-2 500 m events. He died in Newport, Wales in October 2010.
