= Ervin Szörenyi =

Hungarian canoeist

Medal record

Men's canoe sprint

World Championships
| Silver medal – second place | 1954 Mâcon | K-1 4 x 500 m |

Ervin Szörenyi was a Hungarian sprint canoer who competed in the mid-1950s. He won a silver medal in the K-1 4 x 500 m event at the 1954 ICF Canoe Sprint World Championships in Mâcon.
