= Ragnar Heurlin =

Swedish canoeist

Medal record

Men's canoe sprint

World Championships
Gold medal – first place	1954 Mâcon	K-4 10000 m
Silver medal – second place	1954 Mâcon	K-4 1000 m

Ragnar Heurlin (6 August 1928 – 3 February 2013) was a Swedish sprint canoer who competed in the mid to late 1950s. He won two medals at the 1954 ICF Canoe Sprint World Championships in Mâcon with a gold in the K-4 10000 m and a silver in the K-4 1000 m events.

Heurlin also competed in the K-2 1000 m event at the 1956 Summer Olympics in Melbourne, but was eliminated in the heats and did not advance to the final.
