= Heinrich Hell =

German canoeist

Medal record

Men's canoe sprint

World Championships
| Silver medal – second place | 1958 Prague | K-4 10000 m |

Heinrich Hell is a West German sprint canoer who competed in the late 1950s. He won a silver medal in the K-4 10000 m event at the 1958 ICF Canoe Sprint World Championships in Prague.
