= Jiří Kodeš =

Medal record

Men's canoe sprint

World Championships
Bronze medal – third place	1958 Prague	C-2 1000 m
Bronze medal – third place	1958 Prague	C-2 10000 m

Jiří Kodeš (17 February 1933 – 2 March 2006) was a Czech sprint canoer and golf player. As a canoer, he won two bronze medals at the 1958 ICF Canoe Sprint World Championships. As a golfer, he was a successful player in senior categories and became member of the Czech Golf Hall of Fame.

== Life ==
Jiří Kodeš was born on 17 February 1933 in Poděbrady. He graduated from the Faculty of Physical Education and Sport of Charles University in Prague via distance learning and worked as a university physical education teacher. He died on 2 March 2006.

== Canoeing career ==
He competed in the late 1950s and early 1960s. He won two bronze medals at the 1958 ICF Canoe Sprint World Championships in Prague, earning them in the C-2 1000 m and C-2 10000 m events. Paired with Václav Vokál, Kodeš finished fifth in the C-2 1000 m event at the 1960 Summer Olympics in Rome.

== Golf career ==
After he ended the canoeing career, at the age of 37, Kodeš started to play golf and became a member of the Golf Club Poděbrady. At the end of the 1970s, he became a regular participant in the Czechoslovak Championship. At the beginning of the 1980s, he became the manager of the Golf Club Poděbrady golf course and was the main initiator of its reconstruction and expansion. In 1987, he represented Czechoslovakia in the European Championship in Austria. He achieved his greatest success in the senior categories. He won six domestic titles and in 1999 and 2000 was named the best golfer in Europe over 65 years of age. Until 2005, he was a member of the committee of the Czechoslovak and later the Czech Golf Federation. In 2003, he was inducted into the Czech Golf Hall of Fame.
