= Leonid Geishtor =

Soviet-born Belarusian sprint canoeist

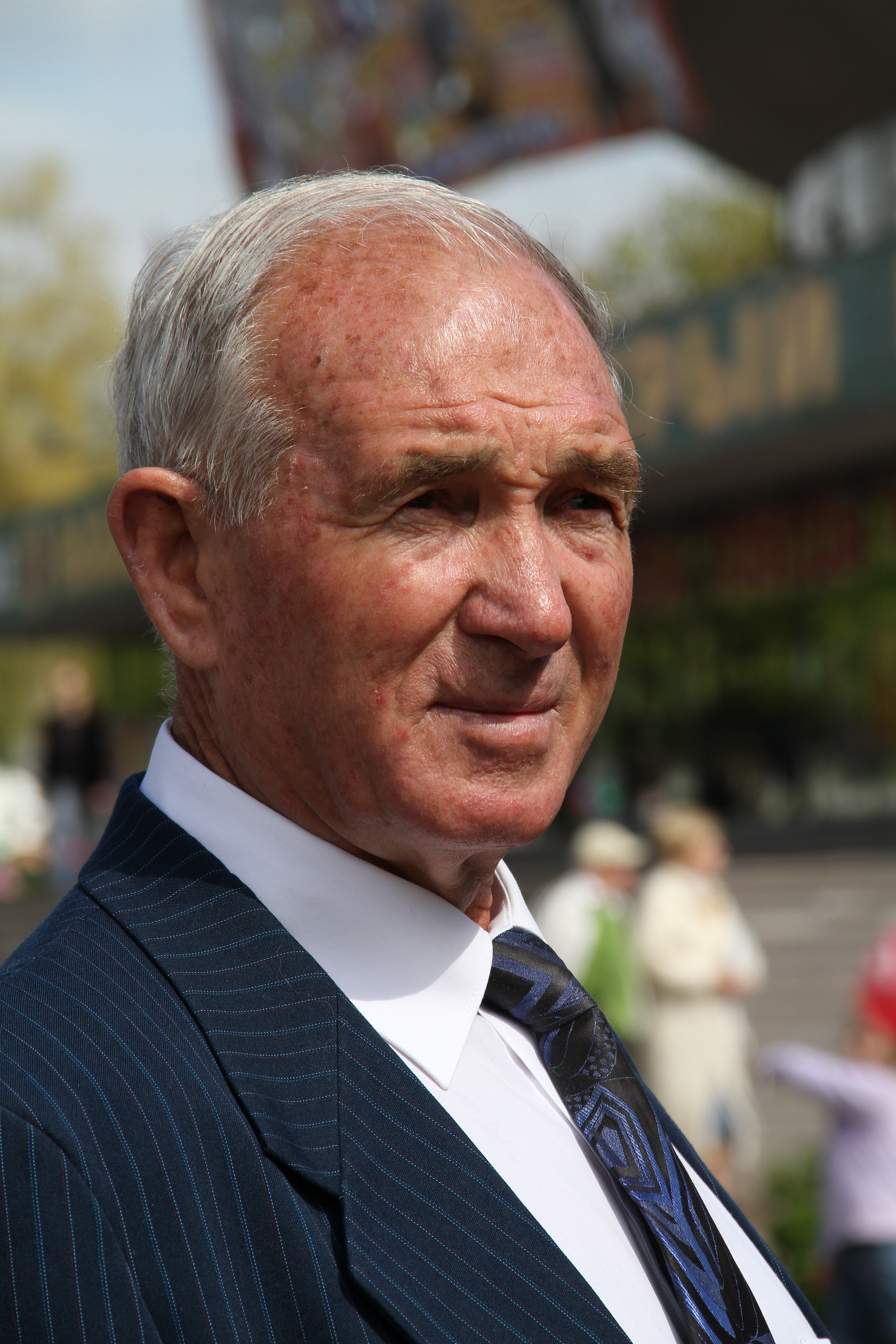
- Geishtor in 2011

Medal record

Men's canoe sprint

Representing Soviet Union

Olympic Games
Gold medal – first place	1960 Rome	C-2 1000 m

World Championships
Gold medal – first place	1963 Jajce	C-2 10000 m

Leonid Grigorievich Geishtor; also Geyshtor (Russian: Леонид Григорьевич Гейштор) (born October 15, 1936, in Homel, Belarusian SSR) is a Soviet-born Belarusian sprint canoeist who competed in the late 1950s and early 1960s.

== Life and career ==
Geishtor is Jewish. He trained at Vodnik in Gomel. Along with teammate Sergei Makarenko, Geishtor won the first Olympic gold medal by a Belarusian competitor. The two won the C-2 1000 m event at the 1960 Summer Olympics in Rome.

Geishtor was awarded the Order of the Badge of Honor in 1960.

Paired with Makarenko, he also won a gold medal in the C-2 10000 m event at the 1963 ICF Canoe Sprint World Championships in Jajce.

== See also ==
- List of select Jewish canoeists
