= Halme =

Halme is a Finnish surname. Notable people with the surname include:

- Aatu Halme (1873–1933), Finnish construction worker, trade union functionary and politician
- Juho Halme (1888–1918), Finnish athlete
- Reijo Halme (1899–1941), Finnish sprinter
- Viljo Halme (1907–1981), Finnish footballer
- Pekka Halme (1927–2018), Finnish athlete.
- Laila Halme (1934–2021), Finnish singer
- Tony Halme (1963–2010), Finnish politician, professional wrestler, writer and actor
- Jussi Halme (born 1980), Finnish ice hockey player
- Jukka Halme (born 1985), Finnish footballer
- Aapo Halme (born 1998), Finnish professional footballer
