= Alfons Rudzinkas =

Soviet canoeist

Medal record

Men's canoe sprint

World Championships
Bronze medal – third place	1958 Prague	K-4 10000 m

Alfons Rudzinskas was a Soviet sprint canoer who competed in the late 1950s. He won a bronze medal in the K-4 10000 m event at the 1958 ICF Canoe Sprint World Championships in Prague.
