= 1954 ICF Canoe Sprint World Championships =

International canoe competition

The 1954 ICF Canoe Sprint World Championships were held in Mâcon, France. This event was held under the auspices of the International Canoe Federation.

The men's competition consisted of four Canadian (single paddle, open boat) and nine kayak events. Two events were held for the women, both in kayak. The type or number of events held at the championships remained unchanged from the previous championships.

This was the fourth championships in canoe sprint.

== Medal summary ==
=== Men's ===
==== Canoe ====
Event	Gold	Time	Silver	Time	Bronze	Time
C-1 1000 m	János Parti (HUN)		István Hernek (HUN)		Jaroslav Poupa (TCH)	
C-1 10000 m	Jiří Vokněr (TCH)		František Čapek (TCH)		István Hernek (HUN)	
C-2 1000 m	Austria; Kurt Liebhart; Engelbert Lulla		Hungary; István Bodor; József Tuza		Hungary; Ferenc Csonka; Mihály Sasvári	
C-2 10000 m	Hungary; Károly Wieland; József Halmay		Hungary; Ferenc Csonka; Mihály Sasvári		Czechoslovakia; Jaroslav Sieger; Zdeněk Ziegler	

==== Kayak ====
Event	Gold	Time	Silver	Time	Bronze	Time
K-1 500 m	Gert Fredriksson (SWE)		Meinhard Mittenberger (GER)		Mircea Anastasescu (ROU)	
K-1 1000 m	Gert Fredriksson (SWE)		Louis Gantois (FRA)		Ferenc Hatlaczki (HUN)	
K-1 10000 m	Ferenc Hatlaczki (HUN)		Miloš Pech (TCH)		Harald Eriksen (NOR)	
K-1 4 x 500 m relay	Sweden; Lars Glassér; Carl-Åke Ljung; Bert Nilsson; Gert Fredriksson		Hungary; Ervin Szörenyi; András Sován; Ferenc Wagner; Ferenc Hatlaczki		Austria; Max Raub; Herbert Wiedermann; Alfred Schmidtberger; Hermann Salzner	
K-2 500 m	West Germany; Ernst Steinhauer; Meinhard Miltenberger		Sweden; Bengt Linfors; Valter Wredgberg		Hungary; Ferenc Wagner; András Sován	
K-2 1000 m	Hungary; István Mészáros; György Mészáros		West Germany; Michel Scheuer; Gustav Schmidt		West Germany; Helmut Noller; Günter Krammer	
K-2 10000 m	Austria; Max Raub; Herbert Wiedermann		Sweden; Sigvard Johansson; Rolf Fjellmann		West Germany; Ernst Steinhauer; Helmuth Stocker	
K-4 1000 m	Hungary; Imre Vagyócki; László Kovács; László Nagy; Zoltán Szigeti		Sweden; Einar Pihl; Ebbe Frick; Ragnar Heurlin; Stig Andersson		France; Maurice Graffen; Marcel Renaud; Louis Gantois; Robert Enteric	
K-4 10000 m	Sweden; Einar Pihl; Ebbe Frick; Ragnar Heurlin; Stig Andersson		Sweden; Hans Wetterström; Carl Sundin; Sigvard Johansson; Rolf Fjellmann		Hungary; János Urányi; István Mészáros; György Mészáros; Ferenc Varga	

=== Women's ===
==== Kayak ====
Event	Gold	Time	Silver	Time	Bronze	Time
K-1 500 m	Therese Zenz (SAA)		Fritzi Schwingl (AUT)		Tove Nielsen (DEN)	
K-2 500 m	Hungary; Hilda Pinter; Klára Fried-Bánfalvi		Hungary; Valeria Lieszkowszky; Vilma Egresi		West Germany; Lisa Schwarz; Gisela Amail	

== Note ==
Zenz competed for Saar, but is listed in official reports as competing for West Germany.

== Medals table ==
Rank	Nation	Gold	Silver	Bronze	Total
1	Hungary (HUN)	6	5	5	16
2	Sweden (SWE)	4	4	0	8
3	Austria (AUT)	2	1	1	4
4	West Germany (FRG)	1	2	3	6
5	Czechoslovakia (TCH)	1	2	2	5
6	Saar (SAA)	1	0	0	1
7	France (FRA)	0	1	1	2
8	Denmark (DEN)	0	0	1	1
8	Norway (NOR)	0	0	1	1
8	Romania (ROU)	0	0	1	1
Totals (10 entries)		15	15	15	45
