= Harald Eriksen (canoeist) =

Norwegian sprint canoeist

Medal record

Men's canoe sprint

World Championships
| Bronze medal – third place | 1954 Mâcon | K-1 10000 m |

Harald Eriksen is a Norwegian sprint canoeist who competed in the mid-1950s. He won a bronze medal in the K-1 10000 m event at the 1954 ICF Canoe Sprint World Championships in Mâcon.
