= Carl-Åke Ljung =

Swedish canoeist (1934–2023)

Medal record

Men's canoe sprint

World Championships
Gold medal – first place	1954 Mâcon	K-1 4 x 500 m

Carl-Åke Ljung (16 August 1934 – 16 February 2023) was a Swedish sprint canoer who competed in the mid to late 1950s. He won a gold medal in the K-1 4 x 500 m event at the 1954 ICF Canoe Sprint World Championships in Mâcon.

Ljung also competed in the K-2 1000 m event at the 1956 Summer Olympics in Melbourne, but was eliminated in the heats.

Ljung died in Västervik on 16 February 2023, at the age of 88.
