= Stig Andersson (canoeist) =

Swedish sprint canoeist (1927–2016)

Medal record

Men's canoe sprint

World Championships
Gold medal – first place	1950 Copenhagen	K-4 10000 m
Gold medal – first place	1954 Mâcon	K-4 10000 m
Silver medal – second place	1954 Mâcon	K-4 1000 m

Stig Andersson (7 August 1927 – 30 April 2016) was a Swedish sprint canoeist who competed in the early to mid-1950s. He won three medals at the ICF Canoe Sprint World Championships with two golds (K-4 10000 m: 1950, 1954) and a silver (K-4 1000 m: 1954). Andersson also won six Swedish championships, four Nordic championships and one European championships. As of 2010, he resided in Västervik.
