= József Tuza =

Hungarian canoeist

Medal record

Men's canoe sprint

World Championships
Silver medal – second place	1954 Mâcon	C-2 1000 m

József Tuza (June 3, 1926 – July 27, 2008) was a Hungarian sprint canoer who competed in the early 1950s. He won a silver medal in the C-2 1000 m event at the 1954 ICF Canoe Sprint World Championships in Mâcon. Tuza also finished fifth in the C-2 1000 m event at the 1952 Summer Olympics in Helsinki.
