= Imre Vagyóczki =

Hungarian canoeist (1932–2023)

Medal record

Men's canoe sprint

Representing Hungary

World Championships
Gold medal – first place	1954 Mâcon	K-4 1000 m

Imre Vagyóczki (sometimes listed as Imre Vagyóczky, 26 July 1932 – 5 March 2023) was a Hungarian sprint canoer who competed in the 1950s. He won a gold medal in the K-4 1000 m at the 1954 ICF Canoe Sprint World Championships in Mâcon.

Vagyóczki also competed in the K-2 1000 m event at the 1956 Summer Olympics in Melbourne, but was eliminated in the heats.

Vagyóczki died in Budapest on 5 March 2023, at the age of 90.
