= Willi Mehlberg =

Medal record

Men's canoe sprint

World Championships
Silver medal – second place	1963 Jajce	C-2 10000 m

Willi Mehlberg (born 28 February 1937) is an East German sprint canoer, born in Stettin, who competed in the early 1960s. He won the gold medal in the C-2 10000 m event at the 1963 ICF Canoe Sprint World Championships in Jajce.

Mehlberg also competed for the United Team of Germany at the 1960 Summer Olympics in Rome, where, paired with Werner Ulrich, he finished seventh in the C-2 10000 m event.
