= András Törő =

American sprint canoer (born 1940)

Olympic medal record

Men's canoe sprint
Bronze medal – third place	1960 Rome	C-2 1000 m

András Törő (born July 10, 1940) is an American sprint canoer who competed from the early 1960s to the mid-1970s. Competing in four Summer Olympics, he won a bronze medal in the C-2 1000 m event at Rome in 1960 along with his doubles partner Imre Farkas.

Törő defected from Hungary during the 1964 Summer Olympics in Tokyo. Earning his degree from the University of Michigan, he went to work as a naval architect and marine engineer. Becoming an American citizen in 1971, Törő competed for the United States in two more Summer Olympics, earning his best finish of sixth in the semifinal event of the C-1 1000 m event at Munich in 1972.

In 2022, Törő received the U.S. Olympic & Paralympic Committee's Olympic & Paralympic Torch Award in recognition of his contributions to the Olympic movement.

== See also ==
- List of Eastern Bloc defectors
