= Giejsz coat of arms =

Polish coat of arms

Giejsz
- Alternative names: Geisz, Gieysz
- Earliest mention: 1180
- Families: Drogiejko, Dzid, Dziel, Eliaszewicz, Eliaszowicz, Gibasiewicz, Gibaszewicz, Giedygołd, Giejsz, Giejsztowt, Gierulski, Giesztowt, Iliaszewicz, Narwoyjn, Nerwojń, Orwid, Orwidowicz, Orwit, Orwitowicz

Giejsz is a Polish coat of arms. It was used by several szlachta families.

== Gallery ==
Andrzejewicz (odm. Giejsz)

== See also ==
- Polish heraldry
- Heraldic family
- List of Polish nobility coats of arms

== Bibliography ==
- Juliusz Karol Ostrowski: Księga herbowa rodów polskich. T. 2. Warszawa: Główny skład księgarnia antykwarska B. Bolcewicza, 1897, s. 88.
- Kasper Niesiecki: Herbarz polski. T. 4. Lipsk: Breitkopf i Heartel, 1841, s. 116.
- Tadeusz Gajl: Herbarz polski od średniowiecza do XX wieku : ponad 4500 herbów szlacheckich 37 tysięcy nazwisk 55 tysięcy rodów. L&L, 2007, s. 406–539. ISBN 978-83-60597-10-1.
