= Aldo Dezi =

Italian sprint canoeist

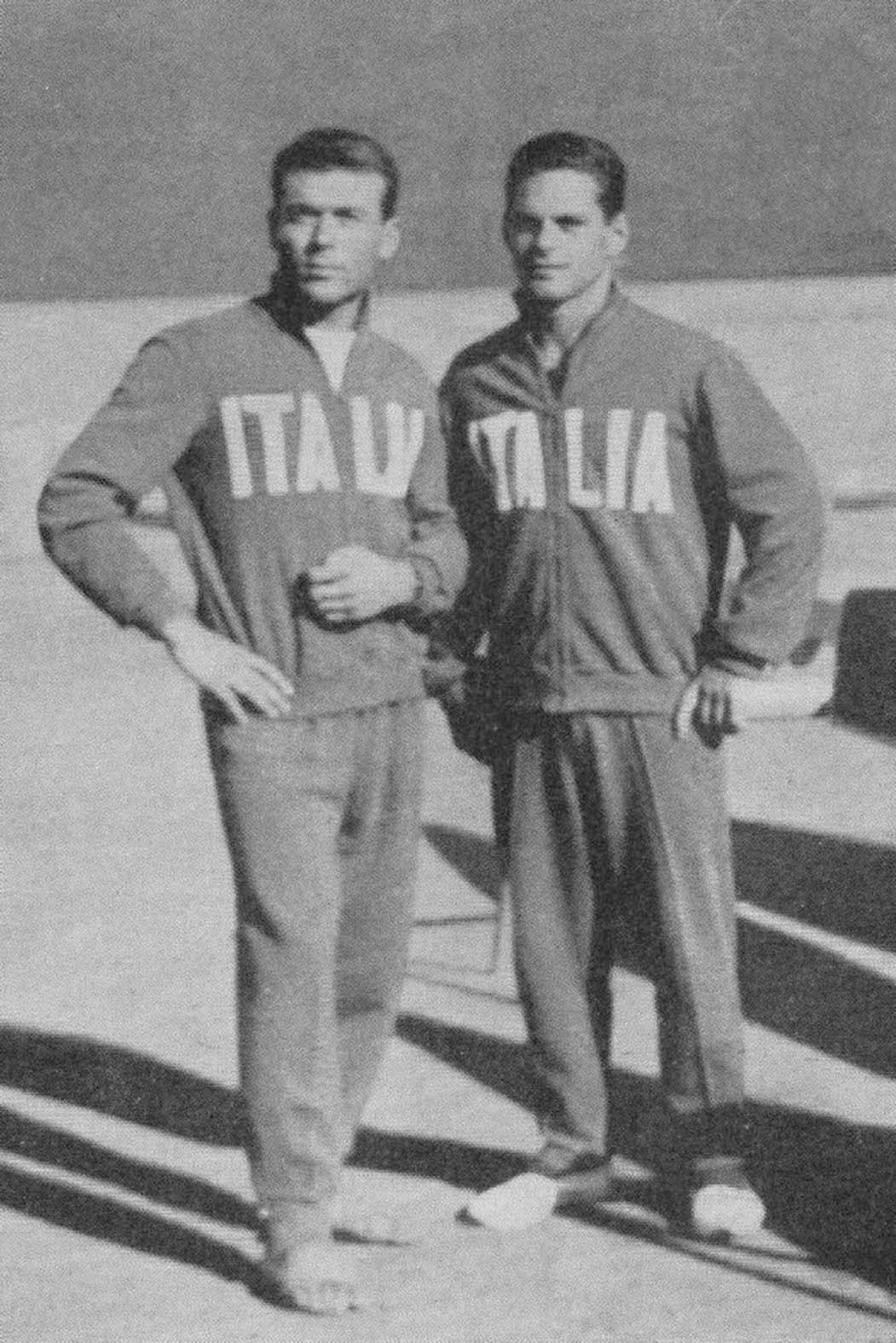
- La Macchia and Dezi (right) at the 1960 Olympics

Personal information
- Born: 27 June 1939 (age 86) Castel Gandolfo, Italy
- Height: 1.65 m (5 ft 5 in)
- Weight: 67 kg (148 lb)

Sport
- Sport: Canoe sprint
- Club: G.S. Marina Militare
Medal record
Representing Italy
Olympic Games
| Silver medal – second place | 1960 Rome | C-2 1000 m |

Aldo Dezi (born 27 June 1939) is a retired Italian canoe sprinter who won a C-2 1000 m silver medal at the 1960 Summer Olympics, when he was paired with Francesco La Macchia. Their victory gave Italy its first medal in canoeing.
