= Volodar Zvyozdkin =

Medal record

Men's canoe sprint

World Championships
Bronze medal – third place	1958 Prague	K-4 10000 m

Volodar Zvyozdkin (Russian: Володар Звёздкин; 26 April 1927 – 9 August 2023) was a Soviet sprint canoer who competed in the late 1950s. He won a bronze medal in the K-4 10000 m event at the 1958 ICF Canoe Sprint World Championships in Prague. Zvyozdkin died on 9 August 2023, at the age of 96.
