= Valeria Lieszkowszky =

Hungarian canoeist

Medal record

Women's canoe sprint

World Championships
Silver medal – second place	1954 Mâcon	K-2 500 m

Valeria Lieszkowszky is a Hungarian sprint canoer who competed in the mid-1950s. She won a silver medal in the K-2 500 m event at the 1954 ICF Canoe Sprint World Championships in Mâcon.
