= Ferenc Varga (athlete) =

Hungarian canoeist (1925–2023)

Medal record

Men's canoe sprint

Olympic Games
Bronze medal – third place	1952 Helsinki	K-2 10000 m

World Championships
Bronze medal – third place	1954 Mâcon	K-4 10000 m

Ferenc Varga (3 July 1925 – 17 January 2023) was a Hungarian canoe sprinter who competed in the early to mid-1950s. He won a bronze medal in the K-2 10000 m event at the 1952 Summer Olympics in Helsinki.

Varga also won a bronze medal in the K-4 10000 m event at the 1954 ICF Canoe Sprint World Championships in Mâcon.

Varga died on 17 January 2023, at the age of 97.
