= Ferenc Csonka =

Hungarian canoeist

Medal record

Men's canoe sprint

World Championships
| Silver medal – second place | 1954 Mâcon | C-2 10000 m |
| Bronze medal – third place | 1954 Mâcon | C-2 1000 m |

Ferenc Csonka is a Hungarian sprint canoer who competed in the early 1950s. He won two medals at the 1954 ICF Canoe Sprint World Championships in Mâcon with a silver in the C-2 10000 m and a bronze in the C-2 1000 m events.
