= István Mészáros (canoeist) =

Hungarian canoeist

Medal record

Men's canoe sprint

World Championships
Gold medal – first place	1954 Mâcon	K-2 1000 m
Bronze medal – third place	1954 Mâcon	K-4 10000 m

István Mészáros (30 April 1933 – 6 May 1994) was a Hungarian sprint canoeist who competed in the mid-1950s. He won two medals at the 1954 ICF Canoe Sprint World Championships in Mâcon with a gold in the K-2 1000 m and a bronze in the K-4 10000 m events.
