= Yevgeny Yatsinenko =

Medal record

Men's canoe sprint

World Championships
Silver medal – second place	1958 Prague	K-2 1000 m

Yevgeney Yatsinenko (January 8, 1925 – December 15, 2013) was a Soviet sprint canoeist who competed in the late 1950s. He won a silver medal in the K-2 1000 m event at the 1958 ICF Canoe Sprint World Championships in Prague. Yatsinenko also finished fifth in the K-2 10000 m event at the 1956 Summer Olympics in Melbourne.
