= András Sován =

Hungarian sprint canoer

Medal record

Men's canoe sprint

World Championships
| Silver medal – second place | 1954 Mâcon | K-1 4 x 500 m |
| Bronze medal – third place | 1954 Mâcon | K-2 500 m |

András Sován is a Hungarian sprint canoer who competed in the mid-1950s. He won two medals at the 1954 ICF Canoe Sprint World Championships in Mâcon with a silver in the K-1 4 x 500m and a bronze in the K-2 500 m events.
