= József Hunics =

Hungarian canoeist (1936–2012)

Personal information
- Born: 10 March 1936 Ráckeresztúr, Hungary
- Died: 27 July 2012 (aged 76)

Sport
- Sport: Canoe racing
Medal record
Representing Hungary
Olympic Games
Bronze medal – third place	1956 Melbourne	C-2 10000 m
European Championships
Gold medal – first place	1959 Duisburg	C-2 1000 m
Silver medal – second place	1959 Duisburg	C-2 10000 m
Bronze medal – third place	1957 Gent	C-2 1000 m

József Hunics (March 10, 1936 – July 27, 2012) was a Hungarian sprint canoer who competed in the late 1950s. He won a bronze medal in the C-2 10000 m event at the 1956 Summer Olympics in Melbourne. His pairing with Imre Farkas led to two national championships in 1956 and 1957. He later teamed up with Gyula Dömötör and they won gold in the one kilometer and silver in the ten thousand meters events at the 1959 Canoe Sprint European Championships. Hunics was forced to retire in 1960 due to health issues at the age of 24. He later became a coach in kayak-canoeing and sport shooting. He died on July 27, 2012.
