= Gustav Schmidt (canoeist) =

West German canoeist (1926–2016)

Medal record

Men's canoe sprint

World Championships
Gold medal – first place	1958 Prague	K-4 1000 m
Gold medal – first place	1958 Prague	K-4 10000 m
Silver medal – second place	1954 Mâcon	K-2 1000 m

Gustav Schmidt (9 August 1926 – 29 December 2016) was a West German sprint canoeist, born in Duisburg, who competed in the 1950s. He won three medals at the ICF Canoe Sprint World Championships with two golds (K-4 1000 m and K-4 10000 m: both 1958) and a silver (K-2 1000 m: 1954). Schmidt also finished fourth in the K-2 1000 m event at the 1952 Summer Olympics in Helsinki.
