= Theodor Kleine =

German canoe sprinter

Medal record

Men's canoe sprint

Representing Germany

Olympic Games
Silver medal – second place	1956 Melbourne	K-2 10000 m

World Championships
Gold medal – first place	1958 Prague	K-4 1000 m
Gold medal – first place	1958 Prague	K-4 10000 m

Theodor "Theo" Kleine (4 September 1924 – 12 February 2014) was a German canoe sprinter who competed in the late 1950s. He won a silver medal in the K-2 10000 m at the 1956 Summer Olympics in Melbourne.

Kleine also won two gold medals at the 1958 ICF Canoe Sprint World Championships in Prague, earning them in the K-4 1000 m and the K-4 10000 m events.
