= Georg Lietz =

West German sprint canoer

Medal record

Men's canoe sprint

World Championships
Gold medal – first place	1958 Prague	K-4 1000 m
Gold medal – first place	1958 Prague	K-4 10000 m

Georg Lietz is a West German canoe sprinter who competed in the late 1950s. He won two gold medals at the 1958 ICF Canoe Sprint World Championships in Prague, earning them in the K-4 1000 m and K-4 10000 m events.
