= Darren Derochie =

Canadian cross-country skier

Darren Derochie (born 1 January 1966) is a Canadian former cross-country skier who competed in the 1992 Winter Olympics.
