= László Nagy (canoeist) =

Hungarian canoeist

Medal record

Men's canoe sprint

World Championships
Gold medal – first place	1954 Mâcon	K-4 1000 m
Silver medal – second place	1958 Prague	K-2 500 m

László Nagy is a Hungarian sprint canoeist who competed in the mid to late 1950s. He won two medals at the ICF Canoe Sprint World Championships with a gold (K-4 1000 m: 1954) and a silver (K-2 500 m: 1958).
