= Imre Farkas (canoeist) =

Hungarian sprint canoer (1935–2020)

Medal record

Men's canoe sprint

Representing Hungary

Olympic Games
Bronze medal – third place	1956 Melbourne	C-2 10000 m
Bronze medal – third place	1960 Rome	C-2 1000 m

András Kassai-Farkas, better known as Imre Farkas (23 June 1935 – 10 August 2020) was a Hungarian sprint canoer who competed in the late 1950s and early 1960s. He was Jewish. Competing in two Summer Olympics, he won two bronze medals, earning one in 1956 (C-2 10000 m) and one in 1960 (C-2 1000 m) with András Törő. He also won two Hungarian championships with József Hunics in 1956 and 1957.

== See also ==
- List of select Jewish canoers
