= Ferenc Hatlaczky =

Hungarian sprint canoer

Medal record

Men's canoe sprint

Olympic Games
Silver medal – second place	1956 Melbourne	K-1 10000 m

World Championships
Gold medal – first place	1954 Mâcon	K-1 10000 m
Silver medal – second place	1954 Mâcon	K-1 4 x 500 m
Silver medal – second place	1958 Prague	K-1 1000 m
Silver medal – second place	1958 Prague	K-1 4 x 500 m
Bronze medal – third place	1954 Mâcon	K-1 1000 m

Ferenc Hatlaczky (sometimes shown as Ferenc Hatlaczki, 17 January 1934 - 8 September 1986) was a Hungarian sprint canoer who competed in the mid to late 1950s. He won a silver medal in the K-1 10000 m event at the 1956 Summer Olympics in Melbourne.

Hatlaczky also won five medals at the ICF Canoe Sprint World Championships with a gold (K-1 10000 m: 1954), three silvers (K-1 1000 m: 1958, K-1 4 x 500 m: 1954, 1958), and a bronze (K-1 1000 m: 1954).
