= 1958 ICF Canoe Sprint World Championships =

The 1958 ICF Canoe Sprint World Championships were held in Prague, Czechoslovakia. This event was held under the auspices of the International Canoe Federation.

The men's competition consisted of four Canadian (single paddle, open boat) and nine kayak events. Two events were held for the women, both in kayak. This was the fifth championships in canoe sprint.

The Soviet Union won their first medals at these championships.

== Medal summary ==
=== Men's ===
==== Canoe ====
Event	Gold	Time	Silver	Time	Bronze	Time
C-1 1000 m	Gennady Bukharin (URS)		Jiří Vokněr (TCH)		Yuriy Vinogradov (URS)	
C-1 10000 m	Gennady Bukharin (URS)		Jiří Vokněr (TCH)		Nichifor Tarara (ROU)	
C-2 1000 m	Romania; Alexe Dumitru; Simion Ismailciuc		Hungary; László Simari; Lajos Bodnar		Czechoslovakia; Jiří Kodeš; Václav Vokál	
C-2 10000 m	Soviet Union; Stepan Oshchepkov; Aleksandr Silayev		Romania; Achim Sidorov; Lavrente Calinov		Czechoslovakia; Jiří Kodeš; Václav Vokál	

==== Kayak ====
Event	Gold	Time	Silver	Time	Bronze	Time
K-1 500 m	Stefan Kapłaniak (POL)		Gert Fredriksson (SWE)		Dieter Krause (GDR)	
K-1 1000 m	Fritz Briel (GER)		Ferenc Hatlaczki (HUN)		Gert Fredriksson (SWE)	
K-1 10000 m	Thorvald Strömberg (FIN)		Ladislav Čepčianský (TCH)		Vagn Schmidt (DEN)	
K-1 4 x 500 m relay	West Germany; Paul Lange; Meinard Miltenberger; Helmut Herz; Fritz Briel		Hungary; György Mészáros; László Kovács; Ferenc Hatlaczki; Lajos Kiss		Sweden; Henri Lindelöf; Carl von Gerber; Sven-Olov Sjödelius; Gert Fredriksson	
K-2 500 m	Poland; Stefan Kapłaniak; Władysław Zieliński		Hungary; László Nagy; László Kovács		West Germany; Meinard Miltenberger; Paul Lange	
K-2 1000 m	Belgium; Henri Verbrugghe; Germain van der Moere		Soviet Union; Yevgeny Yatsinenko; Ivan Golovachov		Soviet Union; Mikhail Kaaleste; Anatoly Demitkov	
K-2 10000 m	Hungary; János Urányi; László Fábián		West Germany; Heinz Ackers; Wilhelm Schlüssel		West Germany; Helmuth Stocker; Franz Teidl	
K-4 1000 m	West Germany; Michel Scheuer; Georg Lietz; Gustav Schmidt; Theodor Kleine		Hungary; György Mészáros; József Pehl; András Szente; János Petroczy		Soviet Union; Mikhail Kaaleste; Igor Pisarev; Anatoliy Trozhenkov; Anatoly Demitkov	
K-4 10000 m	West Germany; Michel Scheuer; Georg Lietz; Gustav Schmidt; Theodor Kleine		West Germany; Günter Kruger; Walter Sander; Heinrich Hell; Hubert Birgels		Soviet Union; Nikolay Rudzinkas; Volodar Zvyozdkin; Alfons Rudzinkas; Vasiliy Stepanov	

=== Women's ===
==== Kayak ====
Event	Gold	Time	Silver	Time	Bronze	Time
K-1 500 m	Yelisaveta Kislova (URS)		Antonina Seredina (URS)		Theresa Zens (GER)	
K-2 500 m	Soviet Union; Nina Gruzintseva; Mariya Shubina		Soviet Union; Antonina Seredina; Yelisaveta Kislova		West Germany; Theresa Zens; Ingrid Hartmann	

== Medals table ==
Rank	Nation	Gold	Silver	Bronze	Total
1	Soviet Union (URS)	5	3	4	12
2	West Germany (FRG)	4	2	4	10
3	Poland (POL)	2	0	0	2
4	Hungary (HUN)	1	5	0	6
5	Romania (ROU)	1	1	1	3
6	Belgium (BEL)	1	0	0	1
6	Finland (FIN)	1	0	0	1
8	Czechoslovakia (TCH)	0	3	2	5
9	Sweden (SWE)	0	1	2	3
10	Denmark (DEN)	0	0	1	1
10	East Germany (GDR)	0	0	1	1
Totals (11 entries)		15	15	15	45
