= László Kovács (canoeist) =

Hungarian canoeist

Medal record

Men's canoe sprint

World Championships
Gold medal – first place	1954 Mâcon	K-4 1000 m
Silver medal – second place	1958 Prague	K-1 4 x 500 m
Silver medal – second place	1958 Prague	K-2 500 m

László Kovács is a Hungarian sprint canoeist who competed in the early 1950s. He won three medals at the ICF Canoe Sprint World Championships with a gold (K-4 1000 m: 1954) and two silvers (K-1 4 x 500 m and K-2 500 m: 1958).
