= Lajos Kiss (sprint canoer) =

Hungarian canoeist (1934–2014)

Personal information
- Born: 22 May 1934 Hungary
- Died: 31 August 2014 (aged 80)
- Occupation: Canoe racer
- Years active: 1950-present
Medal record
Men's canoe sprint
Representing Hungary
Olympic Games
Bronze medal – third place	1956 Melbourne	K-1 1000 m
World Championships
Silver medal – second place	1958 Prague	K-1 4 x 500 m

Lajos Kiss (22 May 1934 – 31 August 2014) was a Hungarian sprint canoer who competed in the late 1950s. He won a bronze medal in the K-1 1000 m event at the 1956 Summer Olympics in Melbourne.

Kiss also won a silver medal in the K-1 4 x 500 m event at the 1958 ICF Canoe Sprint World Championships in Prague.
