= János Urányi =

Hungarian canoeist

Medal record

Men's canoe sprint

Olympic Games
Gold medal – first place	1956 Melbourne	K-2 10000 m

World Championships
Gold medal – first place	1958 Prague	K-2 10000 m
Bronze medal – third place	1954 Mâcon	K-4 10000 m

János Urányi (24 June 1924 – 23 May 1964) was a Hungarian sprint canoer.

Urányi was born in Balatonboglár and competed from the late 1940s to the late 1950s. Competing in three Summer Olympics, he won a gold medal in the K-2 10000 m event at Melbourne in 1956.

Urányi also won two medals at the ICF Canoe Sprint World Championships with a gold (K-2 10000 m: 1958) and a bronze (K-4 10000 m: 1954).

He died in Budapest, aged 39.
