= Canoeing at the 1972 Summer Olympics =

Canoeing at the Games of the XX Olympiad
- No. of events: 11

At the 1972 Summer Olympics in Munich, seven events in sprint canoe racing were contested, and for the first time at the Olympic Games, four events in slalom canoeing were also contested, at the Augsburg Eiskanal.

== Medal table ==
Rank	Nation	Gold	Silver	Bronze	Total
1	Soviet Union	6	0	0	6
2	East Germany	4	1	1	6
3	Romania	1	2	1	4
4	West Germany	0	3	2	5
5	Hungary	0	2	2	4
6	Austria	0	1	0	1
6	Netherlands	0	1	0	1
6	Sweden	0	1	0	1
9	Bulgaria	0	0	1	1
9	France	0	0	1	1
9	Norway	0	0	1	1
9	Poland	0	0	1	1
9	United States	0	0	1	1
Totals (13 entries)		11	11	11	33

== Medal summary ==
=== Slalom ===
Games	Gold	Silver	Bronze
Men's C-1	Reinhard Eiben; East Germany	Reinhold Kauder; West Germany	Jamie McEwan; United States
Men's C-2	Walter Hofmann and Rolf-Dieter Amend (GDR)	Hans-Otto Schumacher and Wilhelm Baues (FRG)	Jean-Louis Olry and Jean-Claude Olry (FRA)
Men's K-1	Siegbert Horn; East Germany	Norbert Sattler; Austria	Harald Gimpel; East Germany
Women's K-1	Angelika Bahmann; East Germany	Gisela Grothaus; West Germany	Magdalena Wunderlich; West Germany

=== Sprint ===
==== Men's events ====
Games	Gold	Silver	Bronze
C-1 1000 metres	Ivan Patzaichin; Romania	Tamás Wichmann; Hungary	Detlef Lewe; West Germany
C-2 1000 metres	Vladas Česiūnas and Yuri Lobanov (URS)	Ivan Patzaichin and Serghei Covaliov (ROU)	Fedia Damianov and Ivan Burtchin (BUL)
K-1 1000 metres	Aleksandr Shaparenko; Soviet Union	Rolf Peterson; Sweden	Géza Csapó; Hungary
K-2 1000 metres	Nikolai Gorbachev and Viktor Kratasyuk (URS)	József Deme and János Rátkai (HUN)	Władysław Szuszkiewicz and Rafał Piszcz (POL)
K-4 1000 metres	Soviet Union; Yuri Filatov; Yuri Stetsenko; Vladimir Morozov; Valeri Didenko	Romania; Aurel Vernescu; Mihai Zafiu; Roman Vartolomeu; Atanase Sciotnic	Norway; Egil Søby; Steinar Amundsen; Tore Berger; Jan Johansen

==== Women's events ====
Games	Gold	Silver	Bronze
K-1 500 metres	Yulia Ryabchinskaya; Soviet Union	Mieke Jaapies; Netherlands	Anna Pfeffer; Hungary
K-2 500 metres	Lyudmila Pinayeva and Yekaterina Kuryshko (URS)	Ilse Kaschube and Petra Grabowski (GDR)	Maria Nichiforov and Viorica Dumitru (ROU)

== See also ==
- 1972 Summer Olympics official report Volume 3. pp. 487–99. (in English, French, and German)
- "Olympic Medal Winners". International Olympic Committee.
