= MTK Budapest (canoeing) =

Canoeing club in Budapest, Hungary

MTK Budapest is a canoeing team based in Budapest, Hungary. MTK's canoeing section is composed of men and women teams.

== Current squad ==
=== Technical and Managerial Staff ===
Canoeing team officials according to the official website:

Name	Nat.	Job
Tamás Wichmann	(Hungary)	Chairman of section
András Rajna	(Hungary)	Section Director
Rita Kőbán	(Hungary)	Coach
István Hargittai	(Hungary)	Coach
Péter Balázs	(Hungary)	Coach (canoe)
Éva Berekalli	(Hungary)	Coach
István Pruzsinszky	(Hungary)	Coach

== Honours ==
=== Olympic medalists ===
The team's olympic medalists are shown below.

Games	Medal	Category	Name
(Italy) 1960 Rome	Silver	Men's K-1 4x500 m	Imre Kemecsey - I. Szöllősi, A. Szente, Gy. Mészáros
1968 Mexico City	Silver	Men's C-2 1000 m	Tamás Wichmann - Gy. Petrikovics
(West Germany) 1972 Munich	Silver	Men's C-1 1000 m	Tamás Wichmann
(Canada) 1976 Montreal	Bronze	Men's C-1 1000 m	Tamás Wichmann
(Canada) 1976 Montreal	Bronze	Men's K-2 1000 m	István Szabó - Z. Bakó
(Soviet Union) 1980 Moscow	Silver	Men's K-2 1000 m	István Szabó - I. Joós
(United States) 1996 Atlanta	Silver	Men's K-4 1000 m	András Rajna - G. Horváth, F. Csipes, A. Adrovicz
(Australia) 2000 Sydney	Gold	Men's K-2 500 m	Botond Storcz - Z. Kammerer
(Australia) 2000 Sydney	Gold	Men's K-4 1000 m	Botond Storcz - Z. Kammerer, Á. Vereckei, G. Horváth
(Australia) 2000 Sydney	Bronze	Men's K-2 1000 m	Krisztián Bártfai - K. Veréb
(Greece) 2004 Athens	Gold	Women's K-2 500 m	Katalin Kovács - N. Janics
(Greece) 2004 Athens	Silver	Women's K-4 500 m	Katalin Kovács - Sz. Szabó, E. Viski, K. Bóta
(China) 2008 Beijing	Gold	Women's K-2 500 m	Katalin Kovács - N. Janics
(China) 2008 Beijing	Silver	Women's K-4 500 m	Katalin Kovács - G. Szabó, D. Kozák, N. Janics
(United Kingdom) 2012 London	Silver	Men's K-4 1000 m	Dávid Tóth, Tamás Kulifai, Dániel Pauman - Z. Kammerer

=== World Championships ===
Year	Category	Name
1954	Men's K-4 1000 m	László Kovács, László Nagy, Zoltán Szigeti, Imre Vagyóczki
1954	Women's K-2 500 m	Hilda Pinter, Klára Fried-Bánfalvi
1970	Men's C-1 10000 m	Tamás Wichmann
1971	Women's K-2 500 m	Katalin Hollósy - A. Pfeffer
1971	Men's C-1 1000 m	Tamás Wichmann - Gy. Petrikovics
1971	Men's C-1 10000 m	Tamás Wichmann
1971	Men's K-1 4x500 m	István Szabó - G. Csapó, Cs. Giczy, M. Hesz
1974	Men's K-2 1000 m	István Szabó - Z. Bakó
1974	Men's C-1 10000 m	Tamás Wichmann
1975	Men's C-2 1000 m	Gábor Árva - P. Povázsay
1975	Men's K-2 10000 m	István Szabó - Z. Bakó
1977	Men's K-2 1000 m	István Szabó - Z. Bakó
1977	Men's C-1 10000 m	Tamás Wichmann
1978	Men's K-2 10000 m	István Szabó - Z. Bakó
1979	Men's C-1 1000 m	Tamás Wichmann
1979	Men's C-1 10000 m	Tamás Wichmann
1981	Men's C-1 10000 m	Tamás Wichmann
1982	Men's C-2 1000 m	János Sarusi Kis - Gy. Hajdú
1982	Men's C-1 10000 m	Tamás Wichmann
1985	Men's C-2 500 m	János Sarusi Kis - I. Vaskuti
1985	Men's K-4 10000 m	Tibor Helyi - Z. Böjti, Z. Kovács, K. Petrovics
1986	Men's C-2 500 m	János Sarusi Kis - I. Vaskuti
1986	Men's C-2 1000 m	János Sarusi Kis - I. Vaskuti
1995	Men's K-4 200 m	Krisztián Bártfai - Gy. Kajner, A. Páger, G. Pankotai
1997	Men's K-1 500 m	Botond Storcz
1997	Men's K-4 500 m	Botond Storcz - Z. Kammerer, R. Hegedűs, G. Horváth
1997	Men's K-1 1000 m	Botond Storcz
1999	Men's K-4 500 m	Botond Storcz - Z. Kammerer, Á. Vereckei, G. Horváth
2001	Women's K-4 200 m	Krisztina Fazekas, Katalin Kovács - K. Dékány, E. Viski
2001	Women's K-4 500 m	Katalin Kovács - Sz. Szabó, K. Bóta, E. Viski
2002	Women's K-4 200 m	Tímea Paksy - N. Janics, Sz. Szabó, K. Bóta
2002	Women's K-1 500 m	Katalin Kovács
2002	Women's K-4 500 m	Katalin Kovács - Sz. Szabó, K. Bóta, E. Viski
2002	Women's K-1 1000 m	Katalin Kovács
2003	Women's K-2 200 m	Tímea Paksy - M. Patyi
2003	Women's K-4 200 m	Katalin Kovács - Sz. Szabó, E. Viski, K. Bóta
2003	Women's K-1 500 m	Katalin Kovács
2003	Women's K-4 500 m	Katalin Kovács - Sz. Szabó, E. Viski, K. Bóta
2003	Women's K-1 1000 m	Katalin Kovács
2003	Women's K-2 1000 m	Tímea Paksy - D. Benedek
2003	Women's K-4 1000 m	Eszter Rasztótsky, Krisztina Fazekas - N. Janics, K. Dékány
2005	Women's K-2 200 m	Katalin Kovács - N. Janics
2005	Women's K-2 500 m	Katalin Kovács - N. Janics
2005	Women's K-2 1000 m	Katalin Kovács - N. Janics
2005	Women's K-4 500 m	Tímea Paksy - E. Viski, Sz. Szabó, K. Bóta
2006	Women's K-1 200 m	Tímea Paksy
2006	Women's K-2 200 m	Katalin Kovács - N. Janics
2006	Women's K-4 200 m	Tímea Paksy, Melinda Patyi, Katalin Kovács - N. Janics
2006	Women's K-2 500 m	Katalin Kovács - N. Janics
2006	Women's K-4 500 m	Krisztina Fazekas, Tímea Paksy, Katalin Kovács: N. Janics
2006	Women's K-2 1000 m	Katalin Kovács - N. Janics
2006	Women's K-4 1000 m	Katalin Kovács, Tímea Paksy - N. Janics, A. Keresztesi
2007	Women's K-1 500 m	Katalin Kovács
2007	Women's K-1 1000 m	Katalin Kovács
2007	Women's K-4 1000 m	Tímea Paksy, Krisztina Fazekas - A. Keresztesi, D. Benedek
2009	Women's K-4 500 m	Dalma Benedek - K. Danuta, N. Janics, K. Kovács
2010	Women's K-4 500 m	Dalma Benedek - N. Janics, T. Csipes, K. Kovács
2011	Men's K-2 500 m	Dávid Tóth, Tamás Kulifai
2011	Women's K-4 500 m	Dalma Benedek - G. Szabó, K. Danuta, K. Kovács

=== European Championships ===
Year	Category	Name
1967	Men's C-2 1000 m	Tamás Wichmann - Gy. Petrikovics
1967	Men's K-2 10000 m	Imre Kemecsey -
1969	Men's C-1 1000 m	Tamás Wichmann
1969	Men's C-1 10000 m	Tamás Wichmann
1997	Men's K-1 500 m	Botond Storcz
1997	Men's K-1 1000 m	Botond Storcz
2001	Women's K-4 200 m	Krisztina Fazekas - K. Dékány, E. Viski, K. Bóta
2001	Women's K-1 500 m	Katalin Kovács
2001	Women's K-4 500 m	Katalin Kovács - K. Bóta, E. Viski, Sz. Szabó
2002	Women's K-1 500 m	Katalin Kovács
2002	Women's K-4 500 m	Katalin Kovács - K. Bóta, Sz. Szabó, E. Viski
2002	Women's K-1 1000 m	Katalin Kovács
2002	Women's K-4 1000 m	Katalin Móni, Tímea Paksy, Alexandra Keresztesi - E. Viski
2004	Women's K-2 500 m	Tímea Paksy - D. Benedek
2004	Men's K-4 500 m	Gábor Kucsera - Z. Benkő, R. Kökény, I. Beé
2004	Women's K-1 1000 m	Katalin Kovács
2005	Women's K-2 200 m	Katalin Kovács - N. Janics
2005	Women's K-2 500 m	Katalin Kovács - N. Janics
2005	Women's K-2 1000 m	Katalin Kovács - N. Janics
2006	Women's K-2 200 m	Katalin Kovács - N. Janics
2006	Women's K-4 200 m	Melinda Patyi, Katalin Kovács, Tímea Paksy - N. Janics
2006	Women's K-2 500 m	Katalin Kovács - N. Janics
2006	Women's K-4 500 m	Krisztina Fazekas, Tímea Paksy, Katalin Kovács: N. Janics
2006	Women's K-4 1000 m	Katalin Kovács, Tímea Paksy - A. Keresztesi, N. Janics
2007	Women's K-2 500 m	Tímea Paksy - D. Benedek
2007	Women's K-4 1000 m	Krisztina Fazekas, Tímea Paksy - D. Benedek, A. Keresztesi
2008	Women's K-4 200 m	Melinda Patyi, Krisztina Fazekas, Tímea Paksy - D. Kozák
2008	Women's K-1 500 m	Katalin Kovács
2008	Women's K-4 1000 m	Krisztina Fazekas, Tímea Paksy - D. Benedek, A. Keresztesi
2009	Women's K-4 200 m	Tímea Paksy, Krisztina Fazekas - N. Janics, K. Kovács
2011	Men's C-4 1000 m	Róbert Mike - M. Tóth, Má. Sáfrán, Mi. Sáfrán
