= Canoeing at the 1972 Summer Olympics – Men's K-4 1000 metres =

The men's K-4 1000 metres event was a fours kayaking event conducted as part of the Canoeing at the 1972 Summer Olympics program.

== Medalists ==
Gold	Silver	Bronze
Soviet Union; Yuri Filatov; Yuri Stetsenko; Vladimir Morozov; Valeri Didenko	Romania; Aurel Vernescu; Mihai Zafiu; Roman Vartolomeu; Atanase Sciotnic	Norway; Egil Søby; Steinar Amundsen; Tore Berger; Jan Johansen

== Results ==
=== Heats ===
The 20 crews first raced in three heats on September 5. The top three finishers from each of the heats advanced directly to the semifinals while the remaining 11 teams were relegated to the repechage heats.

Heat 1
1.	Aurel Vernescu, Mihai Zafiu, Roman Vartolomeu, and Atanase Sciotnic (ROU)	3:16.15	QS
2.	Rudolf Blass, Eberhard Fischer, Rainer Hennes, and Hans-Erich Pasch (FRG)	3:18.42	QS
3.	Lars Andersson, Gunnar Utterberg, Per Larsson, and Hans Nilsson (SWE)	3:19.69	QS
4.	Alberto Ughi, Pierangelo Congiu, Mario Pedretti, and Oreste Perri (ITA)	3:19.77	QR
5.	Robert Avery, Douglas Parnham, Peter Lawler, and John Oliver (GBR)	3:26.65	QR
6.	István Szabó, Peter Várhelyi, Zoltán Bakó, and Csongor Vargha (HUN)	3:29.65	QR
7.	John van Dyke, Jerry Welborn, Philip Rogosheske, and Stephen Kelly (USA)	3:32.94	QR
Heat 2
1.	Yuri Filatov, Yuri Stetsenko, Vladimir Morozov, and Valeri Didenko (URS)	3:18.35	QS
2.	Volkmar Thiede, Eduard Augustin, Herbert Laabs, and Joachim Mattern (GDR)	3:18.65	QS
3.	Zlatomir Šuvački, Ivan Ohmut, Miloš Kralj, and Dušan Flipović (YUG)	3:22.98	QS
4.	Jos Broekx, Roger T'Joncke, Jean-Marie D'Haese, and Paul Stinckens (BEL)	3:23.31	QR
5.	Dennis Green, Dennis Heussner, Rodney Fox, and Gordon Jeffery (AUS)	3:24.63	QR
6.	Dennis Barré, Jean Barre, Dean Oldershaw, and Jim Reardon (CAN)	3:29.75	QR
7.	Hermelindo Soto, Gilberto Soriano, Horacio Flores, and Alejandro Amecua (MEX)	3:34.38	QR
Heat 3
1.	Steinar Amundsen, Tore Berger, Egil Søby, and Jan Johansen (NOR)	3:19.12	QS
2.	Zbigniew Niewiadomski, Jerzy Dziadkowiec, Zdzisław Tomyślak, and Andrzej Matysiak (POL)	3:24.59	QS
3.	Kari Markkanen, Heikki Mäkelä, Ilkka Nummisto, and Jorma Lehtosalo (FIN)	3:26.90	QS
4.	Ladislav Souček, Zdenék Bohutínský, Ľubomír Kadnár, and Pavel Kvasil (TCH)	3:27.62	QR
5.	Gerhard Siebold, Kurt Heubusch, Heinz Rodinger, and Alfred Zechmeister (AUT)	3:27.77	QR
6.	Herminio Menéndez, Álvaro López, Javier Sanz, and José María Esteban (ESP)	3:34.19	QR

=== Repechages ===
Taking place on September 7, The top three competitors in each of the two repechages advanced to the semifinals.

Repechage 1
1.	István Szabó, Peter Várhelyi, Zoltán Bakó, and Csongor Vargha (HUN)	3:14.35	QS
2.	Alberto Ughi, Pierangelo Congiu, Mario Pedretti, and Oreste Perri (ITA)	3:15.68	QS
3.	Dennis Green, Dennis Heussner, Rodney Fox, and Gordon Jeffery (AUS)	3:16.24	QS
4.	Herminio Menéndez, Álvaro López, Javier Sanz, and José María Esteban (ESP)	3:21.07
5.	Gerhard Siebold, Kurt Heubusch, Heinz Rodinger, and Alfred Zechmeister (AUT)	3:21.97
6.	Hermelindo Soto, Gilberto Soriano, Horacio Flores, and Alejandro Amecua (MEX)	3:31.65
Repechage 2
1.	Ladislav Souček, Zdenék Bohutínský, Ľubomír Kadnár, and Pavel Kvasil (TCH)	3:17.39	QS
2.	Jos Broekx, Roger T'Joncke, Jean-Marie D'Haese, and Paul Stinckens (BEL)	3:18.63	QS
3.	Dennis Barré, Jean Barre, Dean Oldershaw, and Jim Reardon (CAN)	3:19.77	QS
4.	John van Dyke, Jerry Welborn, Philip Rogosheske, and Stepehn Kelly (USA)	3:22.89
5.	Robert Avery, Douglas Parnham, Peter Lawler, and John Oliver (GBR)	3:26.80

=== Semifinals ===
The top three finishers in each of the three semifinals (raced on September 8) advanced to the final.

Semifinal 1
1.	Aurel Vernescu, Mihai Zafiu, Roman Vartolomeu, and Atanase Sciotnic (ROU)	3:09.98	QF
2.	Kari Markkanen, Heikki Mäkelä, Ilkka Nummisto, and Jorma Lehtosalo (FIN)	3:11.15	QF
3.	István Szabó, Peter Várhelyi, Zoltán Bakó, and Csongor Vargha (HUN)	3:11.24	QF
4.	Volkmar Thiede, Eduard Augustin, Herbert Laabs, and Joachim Mattern (GDR)	3:11.65
5.	Dennis Barré, Jean Barre, Dean Oldershaw, and Jim Reardon (CAN)	3:20.53
Semifinal 2
1.	Yuri Filatov, Yuri Stetsenko, Vladimir Morozov, and Valeri Didenko (URS)	3:09.68	QF
2.	Lars Andersson, Gunnar Utterberg, Per Larsson, and Hans Nilsson (SWE)	3:10.45	QF
3.	Ladislav Souček, Zdenék Bohutínský, Ľubomír Kadnár, and Pavel Kvasil (TCH)	3:11.57	QF
4.	Zbigniew Niewiadomski, Jerzy Dziadkowiec, Zdzisław Tomyślak, and Andrzej Matysiak (POL)	3:12.46
5.	Dennis Green, Dennis Heussner, Rodney Fox, and Gordon Jeffery (AUS)	3:13.76
Semifinal 3
1.	Steinar Amundsen, Tore Berger, Egil Søby, and Jan Johansen (NOR)	3:08.72	QF
2.	Rudolf Blass, Eberhard Fischer, Rainer Hennes, and Hans-Erich Pasch (FRG)	3:09.71	QF
3.	Alberto Ughi, Pierangelo Congiu, Mario Pedretti, and Oreste Perri (ITA)	3:09.89	QF
4.	Jos Broekx, Roger T'Joncke, Jean-Marie D'Haese, and Paul Stinckens (BEL)	3:10.70
5.	Zlatomir Šuvački, Ivan Ohmut, Miloš Kralj, and Dušan Flipović (YUG)	3:11.21

The Soviet Union's position at 500 meters in the second semifinal is missing in the official report. The third semifinal was so fast that Belgium and Yugoslavia's time would have gotten them into the finals if either nation had competed in the other two semifinals.

=== Final ===
The final was held on September 9.

Gold	Yuri Filatov, Yuri Stetsenko, Vladimir Morozov, and Valeri Didenko (URS)	3:14.02
Silver	Aurel Vernescu, Mihai Zafiu, Roman Vartolomeu, and Atanase Sciotnic (ROU)	3:15.07
Bronze	Steinar Amundsen, Tore Berger, Egil Søby, and Jan Johansen (NOR)	3:15.27
4.	Alberto Ughi, Pierangelo Congiu, Mario Pedretti, and Oreste Perri (ITA)	3:15.60
5.	Rudolf Blass, Eberhard Fischer, Rainer Hennes, and Hans-Erich Pasch (FRG)	3:16.63
6.	István Szabó, Peter Várhelyi, Zoltán Bakó, and Csongor Vargha (HUN)	3:16.88
7.	Kari Markkanen, Heikki Mäkelä, Ilkka Nummisto, and Jorma Lehtosalo (FIN)	3:16.92
8.	Lars Andersson, Gunnar Utterberg, Per Larsson, and Hans Nilsson (SWE)	3:17.39
9.	Ladislav Souček, Zdenék Bohutínský, Ľubomír Kadnár, and Pavel Kvasil (TCH)	3:20.22
