= Didenko (surname) =

Didenko is a Ukrainian surname. Notable people with the surname include:

- Alexei Didenko (born 1983), Russian politician
- Anatoliy Didenko (born 1982), Ukrainian footballer
- Ihor Didenko (born 1967), Ukrainian politician
- Nadiya Didenko (born 1986), Ukrainian freestyle skier
- Valeri Didenko (born 1946), Soviet canoeist
- Vladyslav Didenko (born 1992), Ukrainian politician
- Yulia Didenko (born 1978), Ukrainian politician
