= Ughi =

Ughi is a surname. Notable people with the surname include:

- Alberto Ughi (born 1951), Italian sprint canoer
- Federico Ughi (born 1972), Italian drummer and composer
- Uto Ughi (born 1944), Italian violinist and conductor
- Giovanni J. Ughi, Italian engineer and scientist
- Chantal Ughi (born 1981), Italian-American kick boxer
