= Eberhard Fischer =

Eberhard Fischer may refer to:

- Eberhard Fischer (canoeist)
- Eberhard Fischer (art historian)
- Eberhard Fischer (botanist)
