= MTK Budapest (disambiguation) =

MTK Budapest is a sport society in Budapest, Hungary.

MTK Budapest may also refer to:

- MTK Budapest (women's handball)
- MTK Budapest (canoeing), canoeing/kayaking
- MTK Budapest (fencing)
- MTK Budapest (women's basketball)

== See also ==
- MTK Budapest FC, men's football club
- MTK Budapest FC (women), women's football club
