= Zechmeister =

Zechmeister is a surname. Notable people with the surname include:

- Alfred Zechmeister (born 1950), Austrian sprint canoer
- Barbara Zechmeister, German operatic soprano
- Christa Zechmeister (born 1957), German skier
- Elizabeth Zechmeister (born 1972), American political scientist
- Marianne Zechmeister (born 1960), German skier
