= Pedretti =

Pedretti is an Italian surname. Notable people with the surname include:

- Benoît Pedretti (born 1980), French footballer
- Carlo Pedretti (1928–2018), Italian historian
- Erica Pedretti (1930–2022), Swiss writer and artist
- Giuseppe Pedretti (1694–1770), Italian Baroque painter
- Mario Pedretti (born 1948), Italian sprint canoeist
- Paolo Pedretti (1906–1983), Italian cyclist
- Victoria Pedretti (born 1995), American actress
