= Várhelyi =

Várhelyi may refer to:

== People ==
- Péter Várhelyi (born April 15, 1950) a Hungarian sprint canoer
- Olivér Várhelyi (born 1972), Hungarian diplomat
