= Grupe =

Grupe is a German-language surname. Notable people with the surname include:

- Blake Grupe (born 1998), American football player
- Marion Grupe, East German sprint canoer
- Tommy Grupe (born 1992), German footballer
