= Nikolay Gogol (canoeist) =

Soviet canoer

Medal record

Men's canoe sprint

World Championships
| Gold medal – first place | 1970 Copenhagen | K-1 4 x 500 m |
| Gold medal – first place | 1971 Belgrade | K-1 500 m |
| Gold medal – first place | 1973 Tampere | K-2 500 m |
| Silver medal – second place | 1973 Tampere | K-4 1000 m |
| Bronze medal – third place | 1971 Belgrade | K-2 500 m |

Nikolay Gogol (5 January 1948 – 1997) was a Soviet sprint canoer who competed in the early to mid-1970s. He won five medals at the ICF Canoe Sprint World Championships with three golds (K-1 500 m: 1971, K-1 4 x 500 m: 1970, K-2 500 m: 1973), a silver (K-4 1000 m: 1973), and a bronze (K-2 500 m: 1971).
