= Paul Stinckens =

Belgian sprint canoer (born 1953)

Medal record

Men's canoe sprint

World Championships
Silver medal – second place	1974 Mexico City	K-2 10000 m
Bronze medal – third place	1973 Tampere	K-2 10000 m

Paul Stinckens (Weert, 25 June 1953) is a Belgian canoe sprinter who competed from the early 1970s to the early 1980s. He won two medals in the K-2 10000 m event at the ICF Canoe Sprint World Championships with a silver in 1974 and a bronze in 1973.

Stinckens also competed in three Summer Olympics, but did not advance to the finals in any event he competed. Stinckens' best finish was fourth in the semifinal round twice (K-4 1000 m: 1972, 1976).

Following his athletic career Stinckens founded the company "Unicorn Group" in Overpelt (Belgium), focussing on corporate professional training with outdoor team and leadership development seminars.
