= Alejandro Amezcua =

Mexican sprint canoer (born 1949)

Alejandro Amezcua Carried (born 17 April 1949) is a Mexican canoe sprinter who competed in the early 1970s. He was eliminated in the repechages of the K-4 1000 m event at the 1972 Summer Olympics in Munich.
