= Rolf Peterson =

Swedish canoeist (born 1944)

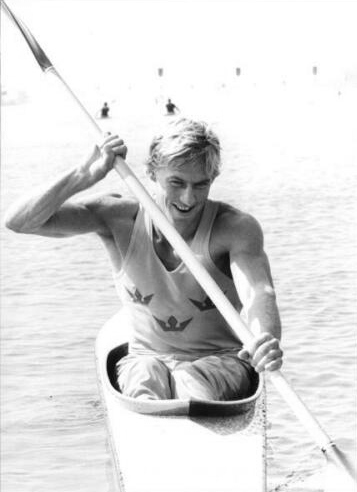
- Rolf Peterson in the 1960s

Personal information
- Born: 11 May 1944 (age 82) Halmstad, Sweden
- Height: 1.86 m (6 ft 1 in)
- Weight: 77 kg (170 lb)

Sport
- Sport: Canoe sprint
- Club: Halmstads Kanotklubb, Kanotföreningen Kanotisterna, Södertälje
Medal record
Representing Sweden
Olympic Games
Gold medal – first place	1964 Tokyo	K-1 1000 m
Silver medal – second place	1972 Munich	K-1 1000 m
World Championships
Gold medal – first place	1970 Copenhagen	K-2 500 m
Gold medal – first place	1971 Belgrade	K-2 500 m
Silver medal – second place	1970 Copenhagen	K-2 1000 m

Rolf Peterson (born 11 May 1944) is a retired Swedish sprint canoeist. He competed in the K-1 1000 m event at the 1964, 1968 and 1972 Olympics and won a gold medal in 1964 and a silver in 1972, finishing fifth in 1968. At the world championships Peterson won two gold and one silver medals in K-2 events in 1970–1971, all with Lars Andersson. He was awarded the Svenska Dagbladet Gold Medal in 1964 and served as the Swedish Olympic flag bearer in 1968.

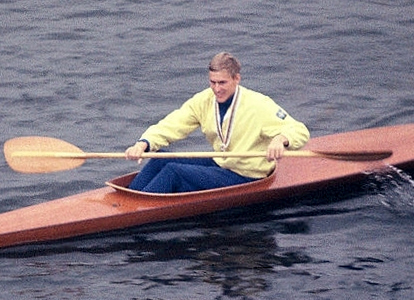
Peterson at the 1964 Olympics

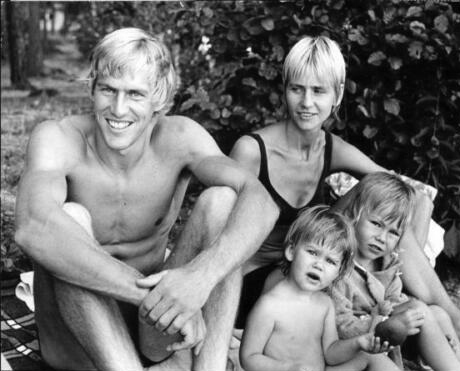
Peterson with wife, Anna Lindgren, and children

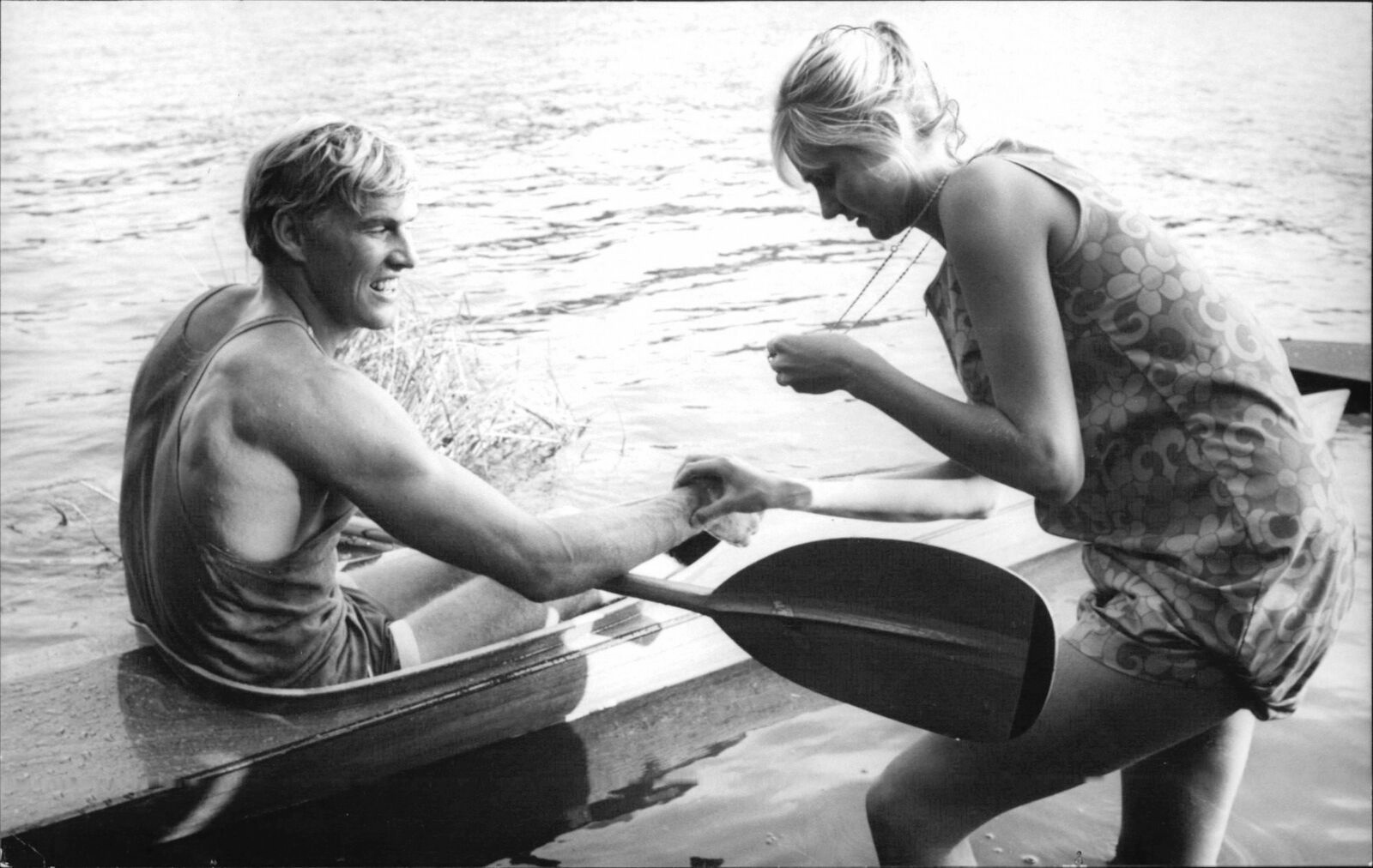
Anna checking Rolf's heart rate in 1968

Awards
Preceded by Jonny Nilsson	Svenska Dagbladet Gold Medal; 1964	Succeeded by Kjell Johansson
