= Jerry Welborn =

American canoeist (born 1932)

Personal information
- Nationality: United States
- Born: January 7, 1932 (age 94)
- Height: 178 cm (5 ft 10 in)
- Weight: 72 kg

Sport
- Sport: Canoeing
- Event: Sprint canoeing

Jerome Lowell "Jerry" Welbourn (born January 7, 1932) is an American sprint canoer who competed in the early 1970s. At the 1972 Summer Olympics in Munich, he was eliminated in the repechages of the K-4 1000 m event.
