= Álvaro López (canoeist) =

Spanish canoeist (born 1952)

Álvaro López Espejo (born 13 February 1952 in Seville) is a Spanish sprint canoeist who competed in the early 1970s. He was eliminated in the repechages of the K-4 1000 m event at the 1972 Summer Olympics in Munich.
