= Jochen Schneider =

German canoeist (1942–2020)

Medal record

Men's canoe sprint

World Championships
Silver medal – second place	1970 Copenhagen	K-4 10000 m
Bronze medal – third place	1971 Belgrade	K-1 10000 m

Jochen Schneider (September 19, 1942 – January 6, 2020) was a West German sprint canoeist who competed in the late 1960s and early 1970s. He won two medals at the ICF Canoe Sprint World Championships a silver (K-4 10000 m: 1970) and a bronze (K-1 10000 m: 1971). Schneider also competed in the K-4 1000 m event at the 1968 Summer Olympics in Mexico City, but was eliminated in the semifinal round. He was born in Stuttgart.
