= Heinz Rodinger =

Austrian canoeist

Heinz Rodinger (born 21 February 1941) is an Austrian sprint canoer who competed in the early 1970s. He was eliminated in the repechages of the K-4 1000 m event at the 1972 Summer Olympics in Munich. From 1956 to 2020 he paddled 333.333 km on various rivers and lakes in Europe, Kanada and Australia.
