= Eduard Augustin =

East German canoeist

Medal record

Men's canoe sprint

World Championships
Silver medal – second place	1970 Copenhagen	K-4 1000 m

Eduard Augustin (born 10 September 1942) is an East German sprint canoer who competed in the early 1970s. He won a silver medal in the K-4 1000 m event at the 1970 ICF Canoe Sprint World Championships in Copenhagen.

Augustin was a reserve for the East German team at the 1968 Summer Olympics but he did not compete. Augustin competed in the K-4 1000 m event at the 1972 Summer Olympics in Munich, but was eliminated in the semifinals.
