= Anatoliy Sedasov =

Soviet sprint canoer

Medal record

Men's canoe sprint

World Championships
Gold medal – first place	1970 Copenhagen	K-1 4 x 500 m
Bronze medal – third place	1971 Belgrade	K-1 4 x 500 m

Anatoliy Mikhailovich Sedasov (Russian: Анато́лий Миха́йлович Седашёв) is a Soviet sprint canoer who competed in the early to mid-1970s. He won two medals in the K-1 4 x 500 m event at the ICF Canoe Sprint World Championships with a gold in 1970 and a bronze in 1971.
