= Pierangelo Congiu =

Italian sprint canoer (born 1951)

Pierangelo Congiu (born 1 June 1951 in Muravera) is an Italian sprint canoer who competed in the early 1970s. At the 1972 Summer Olympics in Munich, he finished fourth in the K-4 1000 m event.
