= Pavel Kvasil =

Czechoslovak sprint canoeist (born 1939)

Personal information
- Born: 27 June 1939 (age 87)
- Spouse: Alena Postlová

Sport
- Sport: Canoeing
Medal record
Men's canoe sprint
World Championships
Bronze medal – third place	1966 East Berlin	K-2 10000 m

Pavel Kvasil (born 27 June 1939) is a Czechoslovak sprint canoeist who competed in the late 1960s and the early 1970s. He won a bronze medal in the K-2 10000 m event at the 1966 ICF Canoe Sprint World Championships in East Berlin.

Kvasil also finished ninth in the K-4 1000 m event at the 1972 Summer Olympics in Munich.

He was married to the competitive rower Alena Postlová; his wife died in 2005.
