= Javier Sanz =

Spanish canoeist

Javier Sanz Celma (born 20 December 1953) is a Spanish sprint canoeist who competed in the early 1970s. He was eliminated in the repechages of the K-4 1000 m event at the 1972 Summer Olympics in Munich. Sanz also competed in the K-4 10000 m event at the 1974 ICF Canoe Sprint World Championships in Mexico City, where his team finished in fifth place.
