= Eugen Botez =

Romanian sprint canoer (1948–2026)

Medal record

Men's canoe sprint

World Championships
Silver medal – second place	1970 Copenhagen	K-1 4 x 500 m
Silver medal – second place	1971 Belgrade	K-1 4 x 500 m

Eugen Botez (19 October 1948 – 20 January 2026) was a Romanian sprint canoer who competed in the early 1970s. He won two silver medals in the K-1 4 x 500 m event at the ICF Canoe Sprint World Championships, earning them in 1970 and 1971. Botez died on 20 January 2026, at the age of 77.
