= Rodney Fox (canoeist) =

Australian sprint canoeist (born 1946)

Rodney Fox (born 26 June 1946) is an Australian sprint canoeist who competed in the 1970s. He was eliminated in the semifinals of the K-4 1000 m event at the 1972 Summer Olympics in Munich.
