= Petra Setzkorn =

Medal record

Women's canoe sprint

World Championships
Silver medal – second place	1970 Copenhagen	K-4 500 m
Silver medal – second place	1971 Belgrade	K-2 500 m
Bronze medal – third place	1970 Copenhagen	K-1 500 m
Bronze medal – third place	1970 Copenhagen	K-2 500 m
Bronze medal – third place	1971 Belgrade	K-1 500 m
Bronze medal – third place	1971 Belgrade	K-4 500 m

Petra Setzkorn is an East German canoe sprinter who competed in the early 1970s. She won six medals at the ICF Canoe Sprint World Championships with two silvers (K-2 500 m: 1971, K-4 500 m: 1970) and four bronzes (K-1 500 m: 1970, 1971; K-2 500 m: 1970, K-4 500 m: 1971).
