= Zdzisław Tomyślak =

Polish canoeist (born 1946)

Zdzisław Tomyślak (born 24 September 1946 in Poznań) is a Polish sprint canoer who competed in the early 1970s. He was eliminated in the semifinals of the K-4 1000 m event at the 1972 Summer Olympics in Munich.
