= John van Dyke (canoeist) =

American sprint canoer (born 1935)

John van Dyke (December 18, 1935 – August 28, 2021) was an American sprint canoer who competed in the early 1970s. At the 1972 Summer Olympics in Munich, he was eliminated in the repechages of the K-4 1000 m event.
