= Dytmarów =

- Village
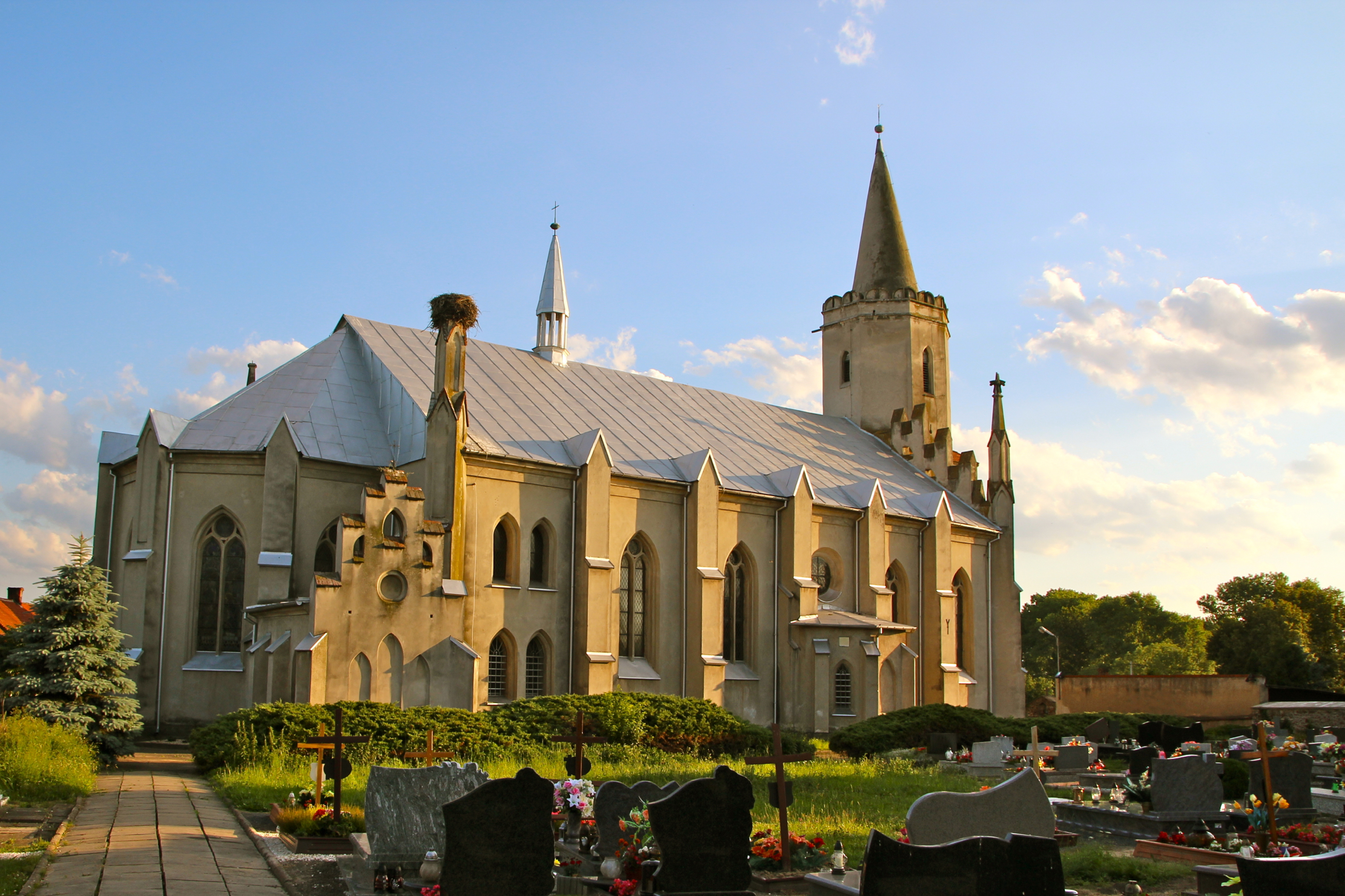
- Saint Catherine of Alexandria church
- Interactive map of Dytmarów
- Location within Poland
- Coordinates: 50°18′45″N 17°39′44″E
- Country: Poland
- Voivodeship: Opole
- County: Prudnik
- Gmina: Lubrza
- Population: 559
- Website: dytmarow.pl

Dytmarów [dɨtˈmaruf] (German: Dittersdorf) is a village in the administrative district of Gmina Lubrza, within Prudnik County, Opole Voivodeship, in south-western Poland, close to the Czech border.

== Notable people ==
- Jerzy Dziadkowiec (born 1949), Polish sprint canoer

== See also ==
- Prudnik Land
