= Viktor Boitschev =

Bulgarian sprint canoer

Medal record

Men's canoe sprint

World Championships
Bronze medal – third place	1971 Belgrade	C-2 500 m
Bronze medal – third place	1971 Belgrade	C-2 1000 m

Viktor Boitschev (Bulgarian: Виктор Бойчев) is a Bulgarian sprint canoer who competed in the early 1970s. He won two bronze medals at the 1971 ICF Canoe Sprint World Championships in Belgrade, earning them in the C-2 500 m and C-2 1000 m events.
