= Heino Kurvet =

Estonian canoeist (1941–2020)

Medal record

Men's canoe sprint

World Championships
Bronze medal – third place	1971 Belgrade	K-4 10000 m

Heino Kurvet (12 September 1941 in Mõisaküla – 9 April 2020) was an Estonian sprint canoer who competed in the early 1970s for the Soviet Union. He won a bronze medal in the K-4 10,000 m event at the 1971 ICF Canoe Sprint World Championships in Belgrade.
