= Roger T'Joncke =

Belgian sprint canoer (born 1945)

Roger t'Joncke (born 18 July 1945 in Petegem-aan-de-Leie) is a Belgian canoe sprinter who competed in the early 1970s. He was eliminated in the semifinals of the K-4 1000 m event at the 1972 Summer Olympics in Munich.
