= Stephen Kelly (canoeist) =

American canoeist

Stephen Kelly (born December 20, 1950) is an American sprint canoer who competed in the early to mid-1970s. At the 1972 Summer Olympics in Munich, he was eliminated in the repechages of the K-4 1000 m event. Four years later in Montreal, Kelly was eliminated in the repechages of the same event. He was also selected four years later to compete in the [ [Moscow] ] Olympics which was boycotted by the United States. In 1996, he was selected to become the Canoeing Competition Manager for the [ [Atlanta] ] Olympic Games.
