= Vladimir Pankov =

Medal record

Men's canoe sprint

World Championships
Silver medal – second place	1971 Belgrade	C-2 500 m

Vladimir Pankov (Russian: Владимир Панков; born 18 February 1950 in Barnaul) is a Soviet sprint canoer who competed in the early 1970s. He won a silver medal in the C-2 500 m event at the 1971 ICF Canoe Sprint World Championships in Belgrade.
