= Volkmar Thiede =

East German sprint canoeist (born 1948)

Medal record

Men's canoe sprint

World Championships
Bronze medal – third place	1974 Mexico City	K-2 1000 m

Volkmar Thiede (born 21 May 1948) is a former East German sprint canoeist who competed in the early to mid-1970s. He won a bronze medal at the 1974 ICF Canoe Sprint World Championships in Mexico City in K-2 1000 m event.

Thiede also competed in the K-4 1000 m event at the 1972 Summer Olympics in Munich, but was eliminated in the semifinals.
