= Willy Tesch =

Swedish sprint canoer

Medal record

Men's canoe sprint

World Championships
| Bronze medal – third place | 1970 Copenhagen | K-4 10000 m |

Willy Tesch was a Swedish sprint canoer who competed in the early 1970s. He won a bronze medal in the K-4 10000 m event at the 1970 ICF Canoe Sprint World Championships in Copenhagen.
