= Dennis Heussner =

Australian canoeist

Dennis Norman Heussner OAM (20 October 1943 – 6 July 2012) was an Australian sprint canoeist and surf lifesaver who competed in the early to mid-1970s. Competing in two Summer Olympics, he was eliminated in the semifinals of the K-4 1000 m event in both 1972 and 1976.

Born in Albury, New South Wales, Heussner was for a period of time the leading gold medalist at the Australian Surf Lifesaving titles. He finished his career as the most successful long board paddler, and a leading malibu, malibu relay, ski, double ski and ski relay champion.

Dennis was succeeded by his son Kane and daughter Holly who won numerous Australian and New South Wales title individually and claimed three Australian Mixed Double ski titles together.

Heussner was inducted into the Surf Life Saving Hall of Fame and the Randwick City Council's Australian Surfing Walk of Fame.
