= Zbigniew Niewiadomski =

Polish canoeist (born 1946)

Zbigniew Jan Niewiadomski (born 18 February 1946 in Ruda, Wieluń County) is a Polish sprint canoeist who competed in the early 1970s. He was eliminated in the semifinals of the K-4 1000 m event at the 1972 Summer Olympics in Munich.
