= Per Palle Storm =

20th-century sculptor active in Norway

Per Palle Storm (1 December 1910 – 6 January 1994) was a Danish-born Norwegian sculptor and professor at the Norwegian National Academy of Fine Arts.

== Biography ==
He was born in Copenhagen and was raised in Argentina. He was the son of Hans Peter Blix Storm and Ellen von Müllen. His father was a businessman who served as a Norwegian Consul. Storm grew up in Buenos Aires where he was a student of the sculptors Bartolome Tasso and Urbici Soler (1927–29). He studied at the Norwegian National Academy of Fine Arts under Wilhelm Rasmussen (1930–33). He also studied art in Germany, Spain, France and Italy. In 1947 he became a professor at the National Academy of Fine Arts, a position he held until 1980, where his students included Oddmund Raudberget.

In 1939, Storm won the competition for a statue of Olympic skier Thorleif Haug which was erected in Drammen. In 1952, he was commissioned by Thomas Fearnley, who was a member of the International Olympic Committee, to design the Fearnley award (Fearnleys olympiske ærespris) in connection with the 1952 Winter Olympics. Storm also accounted for the design of the King Olav V of Norway coin series which was issued between 1958 and 1973.

Among his sculptures are Arbeiderbevegelsens pionerer which was unveiled at Youngstorget in Oslo during 1958. He also designed six bronze sculptures (Handenlangeren, Elektrikeren and Steinhoggeren 1950, Mureren 1951, Tømmermannen 1954, Steinbryteren 1960) situated outside the Oslo City Hall and several World War II memorials.

Storm was awarded the King's Medal of Merit (Kongens fortjenstmedalje) in 1950. He was decorated Knight, First Class of the Order of St. Olav in 1980, and was decorated Knight of the Order of the Dannebrog.

== Personal life ==
In 1948, he married Ingeborg Aasengen Dal f. Amundsen (1903–1991). In 1993, he founded the Ingeborg og Per Palle Storms Legat. Awards from this foundation, Ingeborg og Per Palle Storms ærespris, are distributed for the purpose of accommodating sculptors living in Norway.

== Selected works ==
- Minnesmerke over falne fra Sarpsborg, Tune, Skjeberg og Varteig (1946–1948) Kulåsparken, Sarpsborg
- Statsråd Sven Oftedal (1950) Sven Oftedals plass, Stavanger
- Kong Haakon VII (1950–1951) Torget, Kristiansand
- Krigsminnesmerke (1952) Ris Church, Oslo
- Mann som drikker (1958) Kronprinsesse Märthas plass, Oslo
- Kong Haakon VII (1967–1969) Rådhusparken, Tromsø
