= Vyacheslav Kononov =

Soviet canoeist

Medal record

Men's canoe sprint

World Championships
Gold medal – first place	1970 Copenhagen	K-2 10000 m
Gold medal – first place	1971 Belgrade	K-2 10000 m
Bronze medal – third place	1974 Mexico City	K-2 10000 m

Vyacheslav Kononov was a Soviet sprint canoer who competed in the late 1960s. He won three medals in the K-2 10000 m event at the ICF Canoe Sprint World Championships, two golds (1970, 1971) and a bronze (1974).
