= Jean-Marie D'Haese =

Belgian canoeist (born 1949)

Jean-Marie D'Haese (Zottegem, 7 June 1949) is a Belgian canoe sprinter who competed in the early 1970s. He was eliminated in the semifinals of the K-4 1000 m event at the 1972 Summer Olympics in Munich.
