= Kateryna Koryshko =

Soviet canoeist (born 1949)

Medal record

Women's canoe sprint

Olympic Games
| Gold medal – first place | 1972 Munich | K-2 500 m |

World Championships
| Gold medal – first place | 1971 Belgrade | K-4 500 m |
| Bronze medal – third place | 1971 Belgrade | K-2 500 m |

Yekaterina Kuryshko (Russian: Екатерина Курышко; born 12 April 1949) is a Soviet sprint canoer who competed in the early 1970s. At the 1972 Summer Olympics in Munich, she won a gold medal in the K-2 500 m event. Kuryshko also won two medals at the 1971 ICF Canoe Sprint World Championships in Belgrade with a gold in the K-4 500 m event and a bronze in the K-2 500 m event.
