= Vilmos Nagy =

Hungarian canoeist

Medal record

Men's canoe sprint

World Championships
| Silver medal – second place | 1970 Copenhagen | K-2 10000 m |

Vilmos Nagy is a Hungarian sprint canoer who competed in the early 1970s. He won a silver medal in the K-2 10000 m event at the 1970 ICF Canoe Sprint World Championships in Copenhagen.
