= Emilian Zabara =

Romanian sprint canoer

Medal record

Men's canoe sprint

World Championships
Bronze medal – third place	1971 Belgrade	K-2 10000 m

Emilian Zabara is a Romanian sprint canoer who competed in the early 1970s. He won a bronze medal in the K-2 10000 m event at the 1971 ICF Canoe Sprint World Championships in Belgrade. Born in Chilia Veche (22 January 1946 - 5 June 2016) in a large family of Ukrainian cossacks. At his funerals were present some of his colleagues and life friends as Antrop Varabiev, Costel Coșniță, Ion Dragulschi and Atanase Sciotnic.
