= Sachko Iliev =

Bulgarian sprint canoer

Medal record

Men's canoe sprint

World Championships
Bronze medal – third place	1970 Copenhagen	C-2 1000 m

Sachko Iliev is a Bulgarian sprint canoer who competed in the late 1960s and early 1970s. He won a bronze medal in the C-2 1000 m event at the 1970 ICF Canoe Sprint World Championships in Copenhagen.
