= Ingeborg Loesch =

East German sprint canoer

Medal record

Women's canoe sprint

World Championships
Silver medal – second place	1970 Copenhagen	K-4 500 m

Ingeborg Loesch is an East German sprint canoer who competed in the early 1970s. She won a silver medal in the K-4 500 m event at the 1970 ICF Canoe Sprint World Championships in Copenhagen.
