= Rainer Hennes =

German canoeist

Medal record

Men's canoe sprint

World Championships
Silver medal – second place	1970 Copenhagen	K-4 10000 m
Silver medal – second place	1971 Belgrade	K-4 1000 m

Rainer Hennes (born 9 November 1942) was a West German sprint canoeist who competed in the early 1970s. He won two silver medals at the ICF Canoe Sprint World Championships, earning them in 1970 (K-4 10000 m) and 1971 (K-4 1000 m).

Hennes also finished fifth in the K-4 1000 m event at the 1972 Summer Olympics in Munich.
