= Natalya Boyko =

Russian canoeist

Medal record

Women's canoe sprint

World Championships
Gold medal – first place	1970 Copenhagen	K-4 500 m
Gold medal – first place	1971 Belgrade	K-4 500 m

European Championships
Gold medal – first place	1969 Moscow	K-4 500 m
Bronze medal – third place	1967 Duisburg	K-4 500 m

Natalya Petrovna Boyko (Russian: Наталья Петровна Бойко; 29 June 1946 – 5 August 1996) was a Soviet sprint canoer who competed in the early 1970s. She won two gold medals in the K-4 500 m event at the ICF Canoe Sprint World Championships, earning them in 1970 and 1971.
