= Dušan Flipović =

Yugoslav sprint canoer

Dušan Flipović (12 December 1952 – 14 February 2007) was a Yugoslav sprint canoer who competed in the early 1970s. At the 1972 Summer Olympics in Munich, he was eliminated in the semifinals of the K-4 1000 m event.
