= Anatoliy Kobrisev =

Soviet canoer (born 1950)

Medal record

Men's canoe sprint

World Championships
Gold medal – first place	1970 Copenhagen	K-1 4 x 500 m
Gold medal – first place	1973 Tampere	K-1 4 x 500 m
Silver medal – second place	1974 Mexico City	K-1 4 x 500 m
Bronze medal – third place	1971 Belgrade	K-1 4 x 500 m

Anatoliy Ivanovich Kobrisev (Russian: Анатолий Иванович Кобрисев; born March 1, 1950) is a Soviet sprint canoer who competed in the early to mid-1970s. He won four medals in the K-1 4 x 500 m event at the ICF Canoe Sprint World Championships with two golds (1970, 1973), a silver (1974), and a bronze (1971).
