= Philip Rogosheske =

American canoeist (born 1944)

Philip Rogosheske (born September 13, 1944 in St. Cloud, Minnesota) is an American sprint canoer who competed in the early 1970s. At the 1972 Summer Olympics in Munich, he was eliminated in the repechages of the K-4 1000 m event.
