= Jerzy Dziadkowiec =

Polish canoeist (born 1949)

Jerzy Stanisław Dziadkowiec (born 7 May 1949 in Dytmarów) is a Polish sprint canoer who competed in the early 1970s. He was eliminated in the semifinals of the K-4 1000 m event at the 1972 Summer Olympics in Munich.
