= Afansie Butelchin =

Romanian sprint canoer

Medal record

Men's canoe sprint

World Championships
Silver medal – second place	1970 Copenhagen	C-1 10000 m

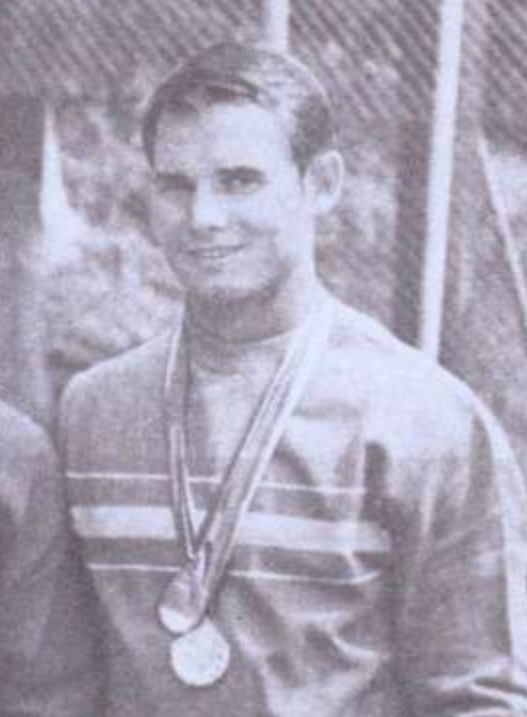
Afanasie Butelchin in 1970

Afanase Butelchin is a Romanian sprint canoer who competed in the late 1960s and early 1970s. He won the silver medal in the C-1 10000 m event at the 1970 ICF Canoe Sprint World Championships in Copenhagen.
