= Costel Coșniță =

Romanian canoeist

Medal record

Men's canoe sprint

World Championships
Gold medal – first place	1971 Belgrade	K-4 10000 m
Silver medal – second place	1975 Belgrade	K-4 10000 m
Bronze medal – third place	1970 Copenhagen	K-2 10000 m
Bronze medal – third place	1971 Belgrade	K-2 1000 m
Bronze medal – third place	1973 Tampere	K-4 10000 m

Costel Coşniţă (born 16 April 1943) is a Romanian sprint canoeist who competed in the early to mid-1970s. He won five medals at the ICF Canoe Sprint World Championships with a gold (K-4 10000 m: 1971), a silver (K-4 10000 m: 1975), and three bronzes (K-2 1000 m: 1971, K-2 10000 m: 1970, K-4 10000 m: 1973.

Coşniţă also finished fifth in the K-2 1000 m event at the 1972 Summer Olympics in Munich.
