= Zdeněk Bohutínský =

Czechoslovak canoeist

Zdeněk Bohutínský (born May 14, 1946) is a Czechoslovak sprint canoer who competed in the early to mid-1970s. Competing in two Summer Olympics, he earned his best finish of ninth in the K-4 1000 m event at Munich in 1972.
