= Ľubomír Kadnár =

Czechoslovak sprint canoer

Ľubomír Kadnár (27 September 1941 – 11 November 2008) was a Czechoslovak sprint canoer who competed in the early 1970s. He finished ninth in the K-4 1000 m event at the 1972 Summer Olympics in Munich.
