= Viktor Tsaryov (canoeist) =

Soviet sprint canoeist (1939–2020)

Medal record

Men's canoe sprint

World Championships
Gold medal – first place	1970 Copenhagen	K-1 10000 m
Gold medal – first place	1971 Belgrade	K-1 10000 m

European Championships
Gold medal – first place	1969 Moscow	K-1 10000 m
Silver medal – second place	1967 Duisburg	K-1 10000 m

Viktor Tsaryov (Russian: Виктор Царёв; 1939 – 2020) was a Soviet sprint canoeist who competed in the early 1970s. He won two gold medals in the K-1 10000 m events at the ICF Canoe Sprint World Championships, earning them in 1970 and 1971.
