= Csongor Vargha =

Hungarian canoeist

Medal record

Men's canoe sprint

World Championships
Gold medal – first place	1973 Tampere	K-4 1000 m
Gold medal – first place	1973 Tampere	K-4 10000 m
Silver medal – second place	1971 Belgrade	K-4 10000 m
Silver medal – second place	1974 Mexico City	K-4 10000 m
Bronze medal – third place	1974 Mexico City	K-4 1000 m

Csonogor Vargha (born 13 February 1946) is a Hungarian canoe sprinter who competed in the early to mid-1970s. He won five medals at the ICF Canoe Sprint World Championships with two golds (K-4 1000 m: 1973, K-4 10000 m: 1973), two silvers (K-4 10000 m: 1971, 1974), and a bronze (K-4 1000 m: 1974).

Vargha also finished sixth in the K-4 1000 m event at the 1972 Summer Olympics in Munich.
