= László Hingt =

Hungarian canoeist

Medal record

Men's canoe sprint

World Championships
Silver medal – second place	1971 Belgrade	C-2 10000 m

László Hingt is a Hungarian sprint canoer who competed in the early 1970s. He won a silver medal in the C-2 10000 m event at the 1971 ICF Canoe Sprint World Championships in Belgrade.
