= Yuri Stetsenko =

Ukrainian canoe racer

Medal record

Men's canoe sprint

Olympic Games
Gold medal – first place	1972 Munich	K-4 1000 m

World Championships
Gold medal – first place	1966 East Berlin	K-2 1000 m
Gold medal – first place	1970 Copenhagen	K-4 1000 m
Gold medal – first place	1971 Belgrade	K-4 1000 m
Bronze medal – third place	1966 East Berlin	K-4 1000 m

Yuri Stetsenko (sometimes listed as Yuriy Zhetchenko, born 11 April 1945) is a Ukrainian sprint canoeist who competed in the late 1960s and early 1970s. Competing in two Summer Olympics, he won a gold medal in the K-4 1000 m event at Munich in 1972.

Stetsenko also won four medals at the ICF Canoe Sprint World Championships with three golds (K-2 1000 m: 1966, K-4 1000 m: 1970, 1971) and a bronze (K-4 1000 m: 1966).
