= Fedia Damianov =

Bulgarian sprint canoer

Medal record

Men's canoe sprint

Representing Bulgaria

Olympic Games
Bronze medal – third place	1972 Munich	C-2 1000 m

World Championships
Bronze medal – third place	1971 Belgrade	C-2 500 m
Bronze medal – third place	1971 Belgrade	C-2 1000 m

Fedia Damianov (Bulgarian: Федя Дамянов; born August 14, 1950) is a Bulgarian sprint canoer who competed in the early 1970s. At the 1972 Summer Olympics in Munich, he won a bronze medal in the C-2 1000 m event.

Damianov also won two bronze medals at the 1971 ICF Canoe Sprint World Championships in Belgrade, earning them in the C-2 500 m and C-2 1000 m events.
