= Marion Grupe =

Medal record

Women's canoe sprint

World Championships
Bronze medal – third place	1971 Belgrade	K-4 500 m

Marion Grupe is an East German sprint canoer who competed in the early 1970s. She won a bronze medal in the K-4 500 m event at the 1971 ICF Canoe Sprint World Championships in Belgrade.
