= Alfred Zechmeister =

Austrian sprint canoer (born 1950)

Alfred Zechmeister (born 1 August 1950) is an Austrian sprint canoer who competed in the early 1970s. He was eliminated in the repechages of the K-4 1000 m event at the 1972 Summer Olympics in Munich.
