= Nordic skiing at the 1992 Winter Olympics =

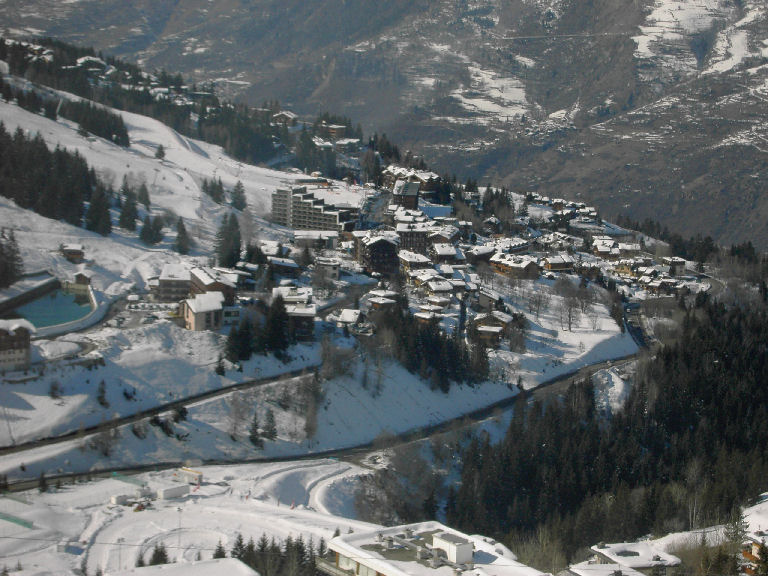

At the 1992 Winter Olympics, fifteen Nordic skiing events were contested – ten cross-country skiing events, three ski jumping events, and two Nordic combined events.

At the men's cross-country skiing Vegard Ulvang of Norway won the 10 km classic and the 30 km classic and Bjørn Dæhlie of Norway won the 15 km pursuit and 50 km freestyle. The Norwegian team, which consisted of Kristen Skjeldal, Vegard Ulvang, Bjørn Dæhlie, and Terje Langli won the men's 4x10 km relay.

At the women's cross-country skiing Lyubov Yegorova of the Unified Team won gold in the 10 km pursuit and 15 km classic, Marjut Rolig of Finland won the 5 km classic, and Stefania Belmondo of Italy won the 30 km freestyle. The Unified Team, which consisted of Lyubov Yegorova, Yelena Välbe, Raisa Smetanina, and Larisa Lazutina won the women's 4x5 km relay.

At the men's ski jumping Toni Nieminen of Finland won the large hill individual while Ernst Vettori of Austria won the normal hill. The Finland team, which consisted of Toni Nieminen, Risto Laakkonen, Ari-Pekka Nikkola, and Mika Laitinen won the large hill team.

At the Nordic combined Fabrice Guy of France won the individual. The Japanese team, which consisted of Kenji Ogiwara, Reiichi Mikata, and Takanori Kono won the team event.

Nordic skiing discipline	Men's events	Women's events
Cross-country skiing	• 10 km (classical)	• 5 km (classical)
Cross-country skiing	• 15 km pursuit	• 10 km pursuit
Cross-country skiing	• 30 km (classical)	• 15 km (classical)
Cross-country skiing	• 50 km (freestyle)	• 30 km (freestyle)
Cross-country skiing	• 4 × 10 km relay	• 4 × 5 km relay
Ski jumping	• Large hill – individual	none
Ski jumping	• Normal hill – individual	none
Ski jumping	• Large hill – team	none
Nordic combined	• Individual	none
Nordic combined	• Team	none
