= Petra Grabowski =

East German canoe racer

Medal record

Women's canoe sprint

Olympic Games
Silver medal – second place	1972 Munich	K-2 500 m

World Championships
Gold medal – first place	1973 Tampere	K-2 500 m
Silver medal – second place	1970 Copenhagen	K-4 500 m
Silver medal – second place	1971 Belgrade	K-2 500 m
Silver medal – second place	1973 Tampere	K-1 500 m
Bronze medal – third place	1970 Copenhagen	K-2 500 m
Bronze medal – third place	1971 Belgrade	K-4 500 m

Petra Grabowski-Borzym (born 31 January 1952 in Brandenburg an der Havel) is an East German canoe sprinter who competed in the early 1970s. She won a silver medal in the K-2 500 m event at the 1972 Summer Olympics in Munich.

Grabowski's husband, Hans-Joachim Borzym, won a bronze medal in the eights rowing event at those same games.

At the ICF Canoe Sprint World Championships, she won six medals with a gold (K-2 500 m: 1973), three silvers (K-1 500 m: 1973, K-2 500 m: 1971, K-4 500 m: 1970), and two bronzes (K-2 500 m: 1970, K-4 500 m: 1971).
