= Yuliya Didenko =

Ukrainian politician and entrepreneur

- Юлія Діденко
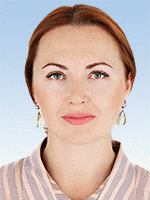

People's Deputy of Ukraine
- Incumbent
- Assumed office 29 August 2019

Personal details
- Born: 8 May 1978 (age 48) Donetsk, Ukrainian SSR, Soviet Union (now Donetsk, Ukraine)
- Party: Servant of the People
- Education: Donetsk National University

Yuliya Oleksandrivna Didenko (Ukrainian: Юлія Олександрівна Діденко; born 8 May 1978) is a Ukrainian entrepreneur, politician and People's Deputy, having been elected to the Verkhovna Rada in 2019.

== Early life and career ==
Didenko was born on 8 May 1978 in Donetsk. She graduated from the Faculty of Human Resource Management of Donetsk National University. Since 2009, she has been engaged in business activities in Odesa. In 2016, she became the founder and head of FIRMA-SOFIA LLC, which is engaged in the activities of hotels and similar means of temporary accommodation. She also worked as the financial director of the Hungarian company Tantal-Plus KFT, which was engaged in the sale of turkey meat, and the commercial director of the LLC "Advertising Agency "VMESTE".

== Political activity ==
Didenko ran successfully as a People's Deputy of Ukraine for President Volodymyr Zelenskyy's Servant of the People party in the 2019 Ukrainian parliamentary election, number 32 on the party list.

Didenko is a member of the Verkhovna Rada's Committee on Finance, Tax and Customs Policy, and head of the subcommittee on personal income taxation, the single social contribution for mandatory state social insurance and other payroll charges. In October 2019, she was suspected of receiving 30,000 dollars for not supporting the draft law on the elimination of corruption schemes during the evaluation of real estate objects in the committee. Didenko voted for draft resolution 0901-P, which does not provide for the existence of Russian-speaking schools.

== Personal life ==
Didenko is married to Hryhoriy Didenko, chairman of the Odesa Oblast Council, and they have two daughters.
