= Mihai Zafiu =

Romanian canoeist

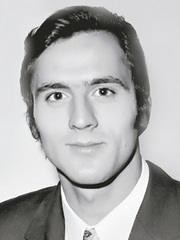

Personal information
- Born: 9 June 1949 (age 77) Bucharest, Romania
- Height: 187 cm (6 ft 2 in)
- Weight: 87 kg (192 lb)

Sport
- Sport: Canoe sprint
- Club: Triumf Bucuresti; CS Dinamo București
Medal record
Representing Romania
Olympic Games
| Silver medal – second place | 1972 Munich | K-4 1000 m |
| Silver medal – second place | 1980 Moscow | K-4 1000 m |
World Championships
| Silver medal – second place | 1970 Copenhagen | K-1 4×500 m |
| Silver medal – second place | 1971 Belgrade | K-1 4×500 m |
| Bronze medal – third place | 1973 Tampere | K-1 4×500 m |
| Gold medal – first place | 1974 Mexico City | K-1 4×500 m |
| Silver medal – second place | 1975 Belgrade | K-1 4×500 m |
| Silver medal – second place | 1978 Belgrade | K-4 1000 m |

Mihai Zafiu (born 9 June 1949) is a Romanian retired canoe sprinter. He competed in the K-4 1000 m event at the 1972, 1976 and 1980 Olympics and won silver medals in 1972 and 1980, placing fourth in 1976. At the world championships he won six medals between 1970 and 1978, five of them in the K-1 4×500 m relay.
