= Roman Vartolomeu =

Romanian flatwater canoer (born 1950)

Medal record

Men's canoe sprint

Representing Romania

Olympic Games
Silver medal – second place	1972 Munich	K-4 1000 m

World Championships
Bronze medal – third place	1973 Tampere	K-1 4 x 500 m

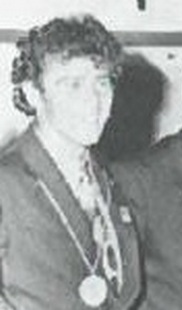

Roman Vartolomeu (born 9 May 1950) is a Romanian flatwater canoer who competed in the early 1970s. He won a silver medal in the K-4 1000 m event at the 1972 Summer Olympics in Munich.

Vartolomeu also won a bronze medal in the K-1 4 x 500 m event at the 1973 ICF Canoe Sprint World Championships in Tampere.
