= Katalin Hollosy =

Hungarian canoeist (born 1950)

Medal record

Women's canoe sprint

World Championships
Gold medal – first place	1971 Belgrade	K-2 500 m

Katalin Hollósy (born February 16, 1950, in Budapest) is a Hungarian sprint canoer who competed in the early 1970s. She won a gold medal in the K-2 500 m event at the 1971 ICF Canoe Sprint World Championships in Belgrade.

Hollósy also finished fourth in the K-2 500 m event at the 1972 Summer Olympics in Munich.
