= 1970 ICF Canoe Sprint World Championships =

International canoe competition

The 1970 ICF Canoe Sprint World Championships were held in Copenhagen, Denmark for the second time after hosting the event in 1950. This event was held under the auspices of the International Canoe Federation. Beginning at these championships, the event would be held on an annual basis in non-Summer Olympic years, a tradition that continues as of 2026.

The men's competition consisted of four Canadian (single paddle, open boat) and nine kayak events. Three events were held for the women, all in kayak.

This was the eighth championships in canoe sprint.

== Medal summary ==
=== Men's ===
==== Canoe ====
Event	Gold	Time	Silver	Time	Bronze	Time
C-1 1000 m	Tibor Tatai (HUN)		Jerzy Opara (POL)		Jiří Čtvrtečka (TCH)	
C-1 10000 m	Tamás Wichmann (HUN)		Afansie Butelchin (ROU)		Nikolay Fedulov (URS)	
C-2 1000 m	Romania; Ivan Patzaichin; Serghei Covaliov		Hungary; Tamás Wichmann; Gyula Petrikovics		Bulgaria; Boris Lubenov; Sachko Iliev	
C-2 10000 m	Romania; Petre Maxim; Gheorghe Simionov		Soviet Union; Valeriy Drybas; Vasiliy Kalyagin		Sweden; Bernt Lindelöf; Erik Zeidlitz	

==== Kayak ====
Event	Gold	Time	Silver	Time	Bronze	Time
K-1 500 m	Anatoliy Tischenko (URS)		Grzegorz Śledziewski (POL)		Jean-Pierre Burny (BEL)	
K-1 1000 m	Aleksandr Shaparenko (URS)		Lars Andersson (SWE)		Grzegorz Śledziewski (POL)	
K-1 10000 m	Viktor Tsaryov (URS)		Erik Hansen (DEN)		Péter Völgyi (HUN)	
K-1 4 x 500 m relay	Soviet Union; Nikolay Gogol; Anatoliy Tischenko; Anatoliy Kobrisev; Anatoliy Sedasov		Romania; Eugen Botez; Mihai Zafiu; Ion Jacob; Aurel Vernescu		Hungary; Géza Csapó; István Csizmadia; Mihály Hesz; József Svidró	
K-2 500 m	Sweden; Lars Andersson; Rolf Peterson		Romania; Aurel Vernescu; Atanase Sciotnic		Austria; Gerhard Seibold; Günther Pfaff	
K-2 1000 m	Austria; Gerhard Seibold; Günther Pfaff		Sweden; Lars Andersson; Rolf Peterson		East Germany; Klaus-Peter Ebeling; Joachim Mattern	
K-2 10000 m	Soviet Union; Konstantin Kostenko; Vyacheslav Kononov		Hungary; Imre Szöllősi; Vilmos Nagy		Romania; Costel Coșniță; Vasilie Simiocenco	
K-4 1000 m	Soviet Union; Yuri Filatov; Valeri Didenko; Yuriy Stetsenko; Vladimir Morozov		East Germany; Uwe Will; Eduard Augustin; Klaus-Peter Ebeling; Joachim Mattern		Hungary; István Szabó; Péter Várhelyi; Csaba Giczy; István Timár	
K-4 10000 m	Norway; Egil Søby; Steinar Amundsen; Tore Berger; Jan Johansen		West Germany; Horst Mattern; Rainer Hennes; Jochen Schneider; Erich Kemnitz		Sweden; Kurt Lycjner; Willy Tesch; Åke Sandin; Hans Nilsson	

=== Women's ===
==== Kayak ====
Event	Gold	Time	Silver	Time	Bronze	Time
K-1 500 m	Lyudmila Pinayeva (URS)		Mieke Jaapies (NED)		Petra Setzkorn (GDR)	
K-2 500 m	West Germany; Roswitha Esser; Renate Breuer		Soviet Union; Lyudmila Bezrukova; Tamara Shymanskaya		East Germany; Petra Setzkorn; Petra Grabowski	
K-4 500 m	Soviet Union; Lyudmila Bezrukova; Tamara Shymanskaya; Natalya Boyko; Ninel Vakula		East Germany; Petra Setzkorn; Petra Grabowski; Ingeborg Loesch; Anita Nüssner-Kobuss		West Germany; Roswitha Esser; Irene Pepinghege; Roswitha Spohr; Monika Bergmann	

== Medals table ==
Rank	Nation	Gold	Silver	Bronze	Total
1	Soviet Union (URS)	8	2	1	11
2	Romania (ROU)	2	3	1	6
3	Hungary (HUN)	2	2	3	7
4	Sweden (SWE)	1	2	2	5
5	West Germany (FRG)	1	1	1	3
6	Austria (AUT)	1	0	1	2
7	Norway (NOR)	1	0	0	1
8	East Germany (GDR)	0	2	3	5
9	Poland (POL)	0	2	1	3
10	Denmark (DEN)	0	1	0	1
10	Netherlands (NED)	0	1	0	1
12	Belgium (BEL)	0	0	1	1
12	Bulgaria (BUL)	0	0	1	1
12	Czechoslovakia (TCH)	0	0	1	1
Totals (14 entries)		16	16	16	48
