= Alberto Ughi =

Italian canoeist (born 1951)

Alberto Ughi (born 16 April 1951 in Livorno) is an Italian sprint canoer who competed in the early 1970s. At the 1972 Summer Olympics in Munich, he finished fourth in the K-4 1000 m event.
