= Eberhard Fischer (canoeist) =

German canoeist

Medal record

Men's canoe sprint

World Championships
Silver medal – second place	1971 Belgrade	K-4 1000 m
Silver medal – second place	1973 Tampere	K-4 10000 m

Eberhard Fischer (born 16 May 1943 in Berlin) is a West German sprint canoeist who competed in the early to mid-1970s. He won two silver medals at the ICF Canoe Sprint World Championships, earning them 1971 (K-4 1000 m) and 1973 (K-4 10000 m).

Fischer also finished fifth in the K-4 1000 m event at the 1972 Summer Olympics in Munich.
