= Mario Pedretti =

Italian canoeist (born 1948)

Mario Pedretti (born 7 February 1948) is an Italian sprint canoeist who competed in the early 1970s. At the 1972 Summer Olympics in Munich, he finished fourth in the K-4 1000 m event.
