= Steinar Amundsen =

Norwegian canoeist (1945–2022)

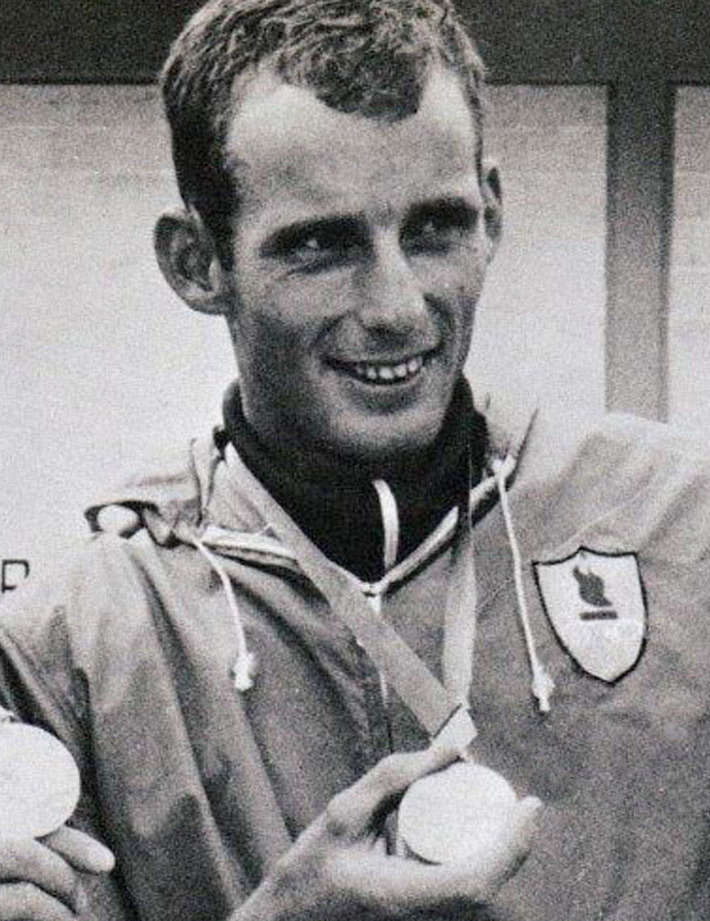
- Amundsen in 1968

Personal information
- Born: 4 July 1945 Bærum, Norway
- Died: 16 June 2022 (aged 76) Røyken, Norway
- Height: 195 cm (6 ft 5 in)
- Weight: 88 kg (194 lb)

Sport
- Sport: Canoe racing
- Club: Bærum KK
Medal record
Representing Norway
Olympic Games
Gold medal – first place	1968 Mexico City	K-4 1000 m
Bronze medal – third place	1972 Munich	K-4 1000 m
World Championships
Gold medal – first place	1970 Copenhagen	K-4 10000 m
Gold medal – first place	1975 Belgrade	K-4 10000 m
European Championships
Gold medal – first place	1969 Moscow	K-4 10000 m

Steinar Amundsen (4 July 1945 – 16 June 2022) was a Norwegian sprint canoeist who mostly competed in four-man events. He won a world title in 1970 and 1975, a European title in 1969, and an Olympic gold medal in 1968, and a bronze medal at the 1972 Games. His younger brother Harald was also an Olympic canoeist.

Amundsen's achievements also include winning four Nordic championships and 13 national titles. He received the Fearnley Olympic award in 1968.
