= Vladimir Ivanovich Morozov (born 1940) =

Soviet canoe racer (1940–2023)

Medal record

Men's canoe sprint

Representing Soviet Union

Olympic Games
Gold medal – first place	1964 Tokyo	K-4 1000 m
Gold medal – first place	1968 Mexico City	K-2 1000 m
Gold medal – first place	1972 Munich	K-4 1000 m

World Championships
Gold medal – first place	1966 East Berlin	K-4 10000 m
Gold medal – first place	1970 Copenhagen	K-4 1000 m
Gold medal – first place	1971 Belgrade	K-4 1000 m
Silver medal – second place	1963 Jajce	K-1 4 x 500 m
Silver medal – second place	1973 Tampere	K-4 1000 m
Bronze medal – third place	1966 East Berlin	K-4 1000 m

Vladimir Ivanovich Morozov (Russian: Владимир Иванович Морозов, sometimes shown as Vladimir Morosov, 4 March 1940 – 8 February 2023) was a Soviet sprint canoeist. He trained at Armed Forces sports society in Krasnovodsk and later in Kyiv.

Morozov was born in Krasnovodsk, Turkmen SSR on 4 March 1940. He began canoeing in 1957 and became a member of the USSR National Team in 1963. He won gold medals for the USSR at three consecutive Olympics between 1964 and 1972.

Morozov also won six medals at the ICF Canoe Sprint World Championships with three golds (K-4 1000 m: 1970, 1971; K-4 10000 m: 1966, two silvers (K-1 4 x 500 m: 1963, K-4 1000 m: 1973), and a bronze (K-4 1000 m: 1966). Morozov was awarded two Orders of the Red Banner of Labour (1969, 1972).

Morozov died on 8 February 2023, at the age of 82.

== Sources ==
- Kamber, Raymond, ed. (2008). "Medal Winners – Olympic Games and World Championships (1936–2007)" (PDF). CanoeICF.com. International Canoe Federation. pp. 1–83. Archived (PDF) from the original on 18 May 2018.
- Evans, Hilary; Gjerde, Arild; Heijmans, Jeroen; Mallon, Bill; et al. "Vladimir Morozov I". Olympics at Sports-Reference.com. Sports Reference LLC. Archived from the original on 19 May 2011.
