= Péter Várhelyi =

Hungarian canoeist

Medal record

Men's canoe sprint

World Championships
Gold medal – first place	1975 Belgrade	K-1 4 x 500 m
Bronze medal – third place	1970 Copenhagen	K-4 1000 m
Bronze medal – third place	1971 Belgrade	K-4 1000 m

Péter Várhelyi (born April 15, 1950) is a Hungarian sprint canoer who competed in the early to mid-1970s. He won three medals at the ICF Canoe Sprint World Championships with a gold (K-1 4 x 500 m: 1975) and two bronzes (K-4 1000 m: 1970, 1971).

Várhelyi also finished sixth in the K-4 1000 m event at the 1972 Summer Olympics in Munich.
