= Jan Johansen (canoeist) =

Norwegian canoeist

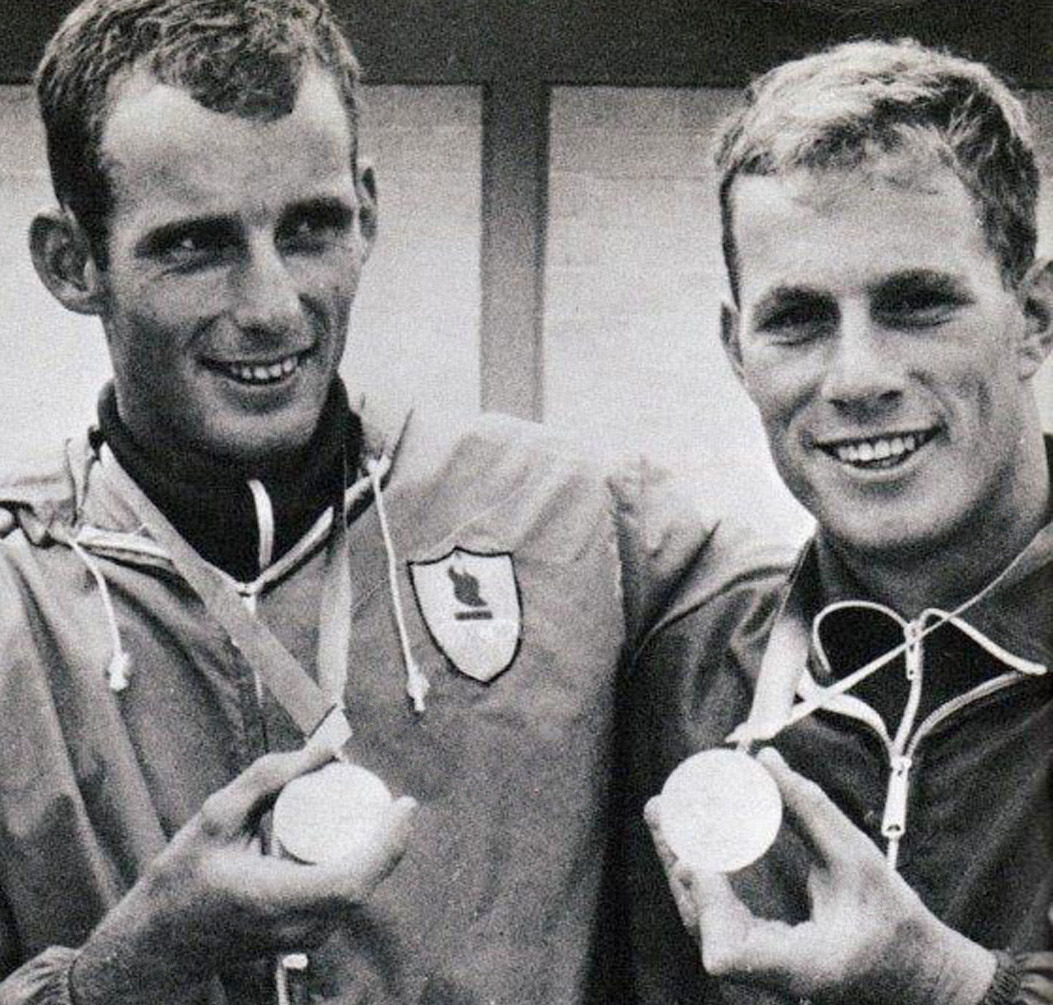
- Johansen (right) in 1968

Personal information
- Born: 3 December 1944 (age 81) Tønsberg, Norway
- Height: 191 cm (6 ft 3 in)
- Weight: 86 kg (190 lb)

Sport
- Sport: Canoe racing
- Club: Tønsberg KK
Medal record
Representing Norway
Olympic Games
Gold medal – first place	1968 Mexico City	K-4 1000 m
Bronze medal – third place	1972 Munich	K-4 1000 m
World Championships
Silver medal – second place	1966 East Berlin	K-2 10000 m
Gold medal – first place	1970 Copenhagen	K-4 10000 m
Silver medal – second place	1971 Belgrade	K-2 10000 m
European Championships
Gold medal – first place	1969 Moscow	K-4 10000 m
Silver medal – second place	1969 Moscow	K-2 10000 m

Jan Johansen (born 3 December 1944) is a retired Norwegian canoeist. He competed in the four-man 1000 m sprint at the 1968 and 1972 Olympics and won a gold and a bronze medal, respectively. Between 1966 and 1971, Søby collected two gold and three silver medals in two-man and four-man 10,000 m events at the world and European championships.
