= Yuri Filatov =

Canoe racer (born 1948)

Medal record

Men's canoe sprint

Olympic Games
Gold medal – first place	1972 Munich	K-4 1000 m
Gold medal – first place	1976 Montreal	K-4 1000 m

World Championships
Gold medal – first place	1970 Copenhagen	K-4 1000 m
Gold medal – first place	1971 Belgrade	K-4 1000 m
Silver medal – second place	1973 Tampere	K-4 1000 m
Silver medal – second place	1974 Mexico City	K-4 1000 m

Yuri Nikolayevich Filatov (Russian: Юрий Николаевич Филатов; Ukrainian: Юрій Миколайович Філатов, born 30 July 1948) is a Soviet-born Ukrainian sprint canoeist who competed in the 1970s. Competing in two Summer Olympics, he won two gold medals in the K-4 1000 m event, earning them in 1972 and 1976.

Filatov also won four medals in the K-4 1000 m event at the ICF Canoe Sprint World Championships with two golds (1970, 1971) and two silvers (1973, 1974).
