= 1971 ICF Canoe Sprint World Championships =

International canoe competition

The 1971 ICF Canoe Sprint World Championships were held in Belgrade, Yugoslavia.

The men's competition consisted of six canoe (single paddle, open boat) and nine kayak events. Three events were held for women, all in kayak. C-1 500 m and C-2 500 m events debuted at this ICF Canoe Sprint World Championships, the ninth Championships in canoe sprint.

== Medal summary ==
=== Men's ===
==== Canoe ====
Event	Gold	Time	Silver	Time	Bronze	Time
C-1 500 m	Detlef Lewe (GER)		Tamás Wichmann (HUN)		Ivan Patzaichin (ROU)	
C-1 1000 m	Detlef Lewe (GER)		Tibor Tatai (HUN)		Vladas Česiūnas (URS)	
C-1 10000 m	Tamás Wichmann (HUN)		Vasiliy Yurchenko (URS)		Lipat Varabiev (ROU)	
C-2 500 m	Romania; Gheorghe Danielov; Gheorghe Simionov		Soviet Union; Yuri Lobanov; Vladimir Pankov		Bulgaria; Viktor Boitschev; Fedia Damianov	
C-2 1000 m	Hungary; Tamás Wichmann; Gyula Petrikovics		Romania; Ivan Patzaichin; Serghei Covaliov		Bulgaria; Viktor Boitschev; Fedia Damianov	
C-2 10000 m	Soviet Union; Naum Prokupets; Aleksandr Vinogradov		Hungary; László Hingt; István Cserha		Romania; Serghei Covaliov; Vicol Calabiciov	

==== Kayak ====
Event	Gold	Time	Silver	Time	Bronze	Time
K-1 500 m	Nikolay Gogol (URS)		Ladislav Souček (TCH)		Mihály Hesz (HUN)	
K-1 1000 m	Grzegorz Śledziewski (POL)		Lars Andersson (SWE)		Aleksandr Shaparenko (URS)	
K-1 10000 m	Viktor Tsaryov (URS)		Péter Völgyi (HUN)		Jochen Schneider (GER)	
K-1 4 x 500 m relay	Hungary; Géza Csapó; István Szabó; Csaba Giczy; Mihály Hesz		Romania; Dimitrie Ivanov; Mihai Zafiu; Eugen Botez; Aurel Vernescu		Soviet Union; Anatoliy Kobrisev; Anatoliy Sedasov; Leonid Derevyanko; Anatoliy Tischenko	
K-2 500 m	Sweden; Lars Andersson; Rolf Peterson		Belgium; Jean-Pierre Burny; Paul Hoekstra		Soviet Union; Nikolay Gogol; Pytor Greshta	
K-2 1000 m	East Germany; Reiner Kurth; Alexander Slatnow		Austria; Gerhard Seibold; Günther Pfaff		Romania; Costel Coșniță; Vasilie Simiocenco	
K-2 10000 m	Soviet Union; Konstantin Kostenko; Vyacheslav Kononov		Norway; Egil Søby; Jan Johansen		Romania; Antrop Varabiev; Emilian Zabara	
K-4 1000 m	Soviet Union; Yuri Filatov; Vladimir Morozov; Yuriy Stetsenko; Valeri Didenko		West Germany; Hans-Erich Pasch; Rainer Hennes; Rudolf Blass; Eberhard Fischer		Hungary; István Szabó; Péter Várhelyi; Zoltán Bakó; Géza Csapó	
K-4 10000 m	Romania; Cuprian Macarencu; Costel Coșniță; Vasilie Simiocenco; Atanase Sciotnic		Hungary; Csaba Giczy; István Timár; György Mészáros; Csongor Vargha		Soviet Union; Heino Kurvet; Nikolai Gorbachev; Vladimir Klimov; Vladimir Zemlyakov	

=== Women's ===
==== Kayak ====
Event	Gold	Time	Silver	Time	Bronze	Time
K-1 500 m	Lyudmila Pinayeva (URS)		Mieke Jaapies (NED)		Petra Setzkorn (GDR)	
K-2 500 m	Hungary; Anna Pfeffer; Katalin Hollósy		East Germany; Petra Setzkorn; Petra Grabowski		Soviet Union; Tamara Popova; Yekaterina Kuryshko	
K-4 500 m	Soviet Union; Yekaterina Kuryshko; Natalya Boyko; Yuliya Ryabtzhinskaya; Lyudmila Pinayeva		West Germany; Renate Breuer; Roswitha Esser; Irene Pepinghege; Heiderose Wallbaum		East Germany; Petra Setzkorn; Marion Grupe; Bettina Müller; Petra Grabowski	

== Medals table ==
Rank	Nation	Gold	Silver	Bronze	Total
1	Soviet Union (URS)	7	2	6	15
2	Hungary (HUN)	4	5	2	11
3	Romania (ROU)	2	2	5	9
4	West Germany (FRG)	2	2	1	5
5	East Germany (GDR)	1	1	2	4
6	Sweden (SWE)	1	1	0	2
7	Poland (POL)	1	0	0	1
8	Austria (AUT)	0	1	0	1
8	Belgium (BEL)	0	1	0	1
8	Czechoslovakia (TCH)	0	1	0	1
8	Netherlands (NED)	0	1	0	1
8	Norway (NOR)	0	1	0	1
13	Bulgaria (BUL)	0	0	2	2
Totals (13 entries)		18	18	18	54
