= Atanase Sciotnic =

Romanian canoeist

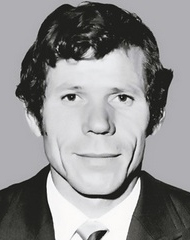

Personal information
- Born: 1 March 1942 Tulcea County, Romania
- Died: 5 April 2017 (aged 75)
- Height: 182 cm (6 ft 0 in)
- Weight: 77 kg (170 lb)

Sport
- Sport: Canoe sprint
- Club: Dinamo Bucharest
Medal record
Representing Romania
Olympic Games
Silver medal – second place	1972 Munich	K-4 1000 m
Bronze medal – third place	1964 Tokyo	K-4 1000 m
World Championships
Gold medal – first place	1966 East Berlin	K-2 500 m
Gold medal – first place	1966 East Berlin	K-4 1000 m
Gold medal – first place	1971 Belgrade	K-4 10000 m
Gold medal – first place	1974 Mexico City	K-1 4×500 m
Silver medal – second place	1966 East Berlin	K-2 1000 m
Silver medal – second place	1970 Copenhagen	K-2 500 m
Bronze medal – third place	1966 East Berlin	K-1 4×500 m
Bronze medal – third place	1973 Tampere	K-1 4×500 m
Bronze medal – third place	1973 Tampere	K-4 10000 m

Atanase Sciotnic, also listed as Atanasie (1 March 1942 – 5 April 2017), was a Romanian sprint canoeist. He took part in the two-man and four man events at most major competitions between 1963 and 1974 and won two Olympic and nine world championships medals, including four gold medals.
