= Ladislav Souček =

Czech sprint canoer (born 1946)

Medal record

Men's canoe sprint

World Championships
Silver medal – second place	1971 Belgrade	K-1 500 m

Ladislav Souček (born 12 May 1946 in Modřany) is a Czech sprint canoeist who competed for Czechoslovakia in the early to mid-1970s. He won a silver medal in the K-1 500 m event at the 1971 ICF Canoe Sprint World Championships in Belgrade.

Souček also competed in two Summer Olympics, earning his best finish of fifth in the K-1 1000 m event at Munich in 1972.
