= Géza Csapó =

Hungarian sprint canoeist

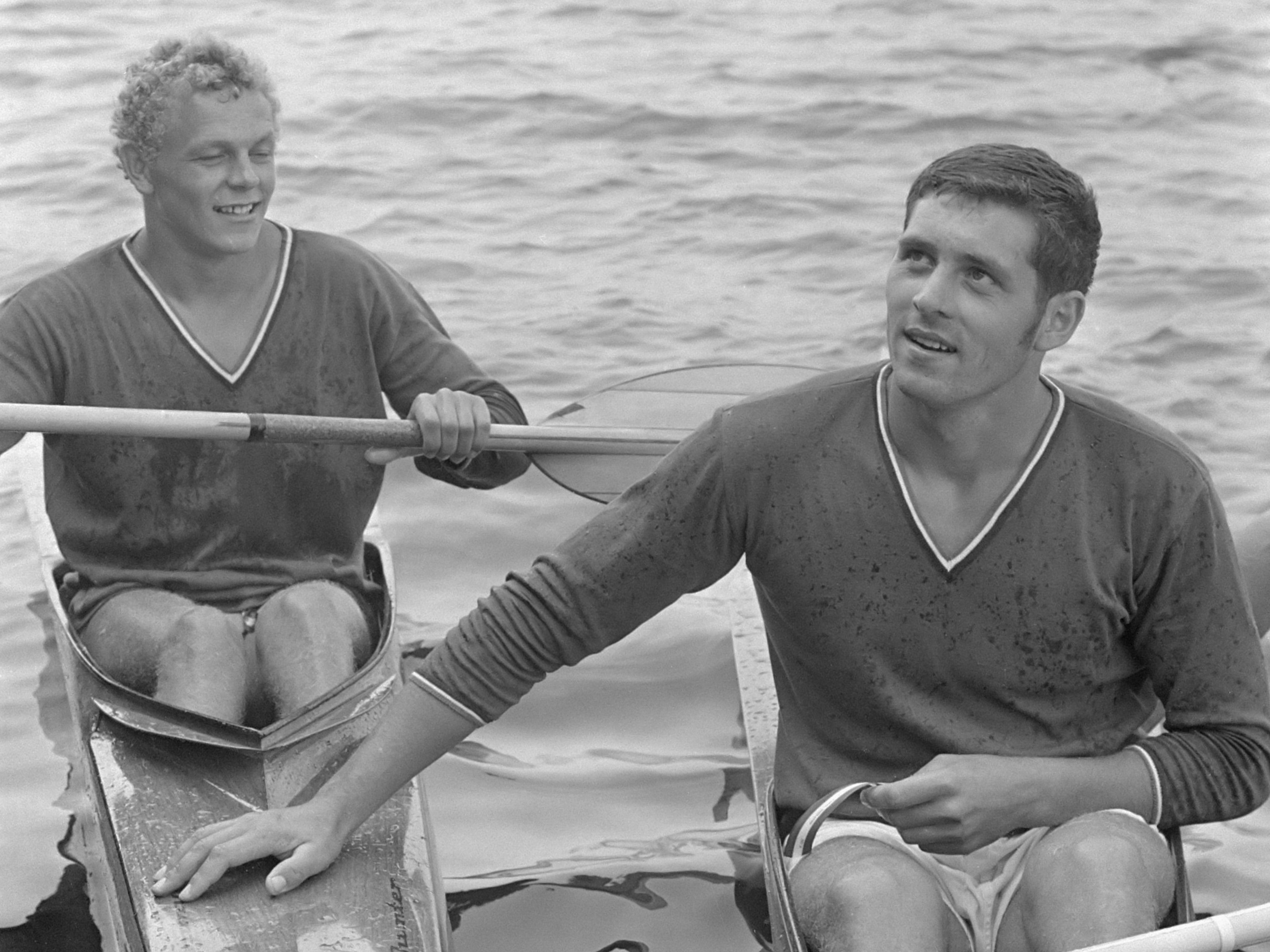
- Svidró and Csapó (r.) in 1971

Medal record

Men's canoe sprint

Representing Hungary

Olympic Games
Silver medal – second place	1976 Montreal	K-1 1000 m
Bronze medal – third place	1972 Munich	K-1 1000 m

World Championships
Gold medal – first place	1971 Belgrade	K-1 4 x 500 m
Gold medal – first place	1973 Tampere	K-1 500 m
Gold medal – first place	1973 Tampere	K-1 1000 m
Gold medal – first place	1973 Tampere	K-2 10000 m
Gold medal – first place	1974 Mexico City	K-1 1000 m
Gold medal – first place	1975 Belgrade	K-1 500 m
Silver medal – second place	1973 Tampere	K-1 4 x 500 m
Silver medal – second place	1974 Mexico City	K-1 500 m
Bronze medal – third place	1970 Copenhagen	K-1 4 x 500 m
Bronze medal – third place	1971 Belgrade	K-4 1000 m
Bronze medal – third place	1977 Sofia	K-2 500 m

Géza Csapó (29 December 1950 – 14 September 2022) was a Hungarian sprint canoeist who competed in the 1970s. Competing in two Summer Olympics, he won two medals in K-1 1000 m event with a silver in 1976 and a bronze in 1972.

Csapó also won eleven medals at the ICF Canoe Sprint World Championships with six golds (K-1 500 m: 1973, 1975; K-1 1000 m: 1973, 1974; K-1 4 x 500 m: 1971, K-2 10000 m: 1973), two silvers (K-1 500 m: 1973, K-1 4 x 500 m: 1973), and three bronzes (K-1 4 x 500 m: 1970, K-2 500 m: 1977, K-4 1000 m: 1971).

Csapó was elected Hungarian Sportsman of the year in 1973 after winning three gold medals at that year's World Championships.

Csapó died on 14 September 2022, at the age of 71.

Awards
Preceded by András Balczó	Hungarian Sportsman of The Year; 1973	Succeeded by Zoltán Magyar
