= Tore Berger =

Norwegian canoeist (1944–2026)

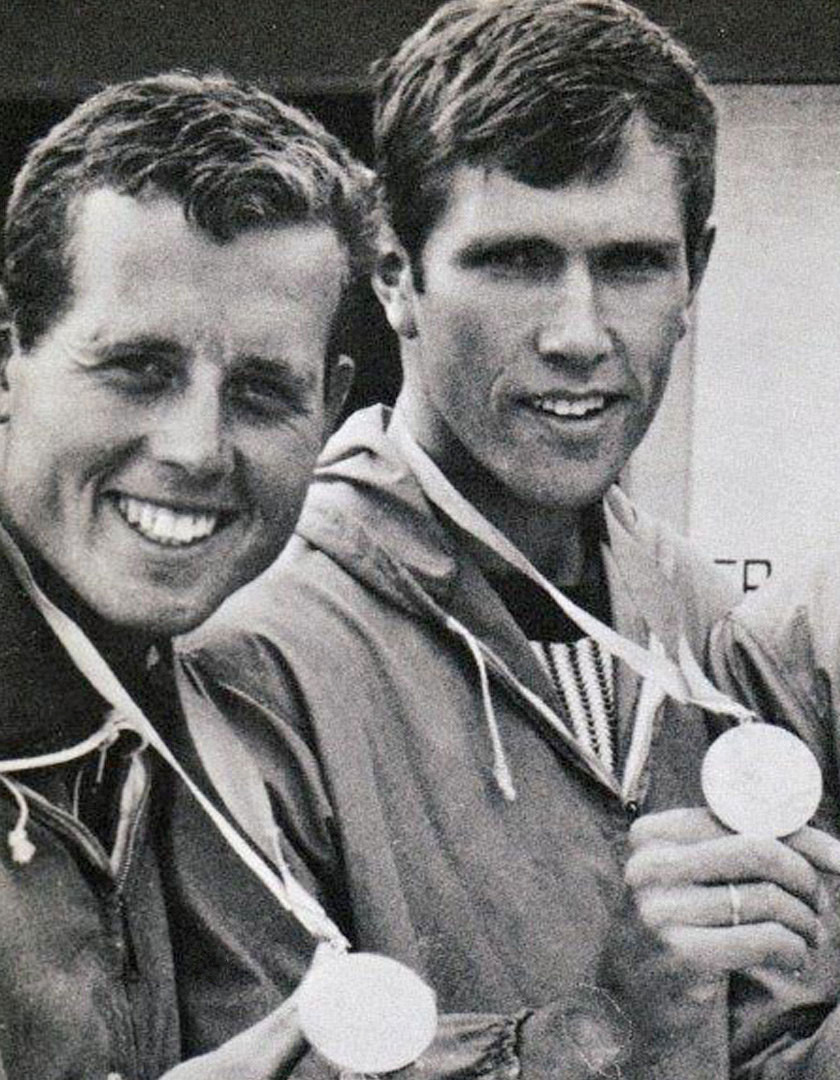
- Berger (right) in 1968

Personal information
- Born: 11 November 1944 Asker, German-occupied Norway
- Died: 19 May 2026 (aged 81) Bærum, Norway
- Height: 186 cm (6 ft 1 in)
- Weight: 76 kg (168 lb)

Sport
- Sport: Canoe racing
- Club: Bærum KK
Medal record
Representing Norway
Olympic Games
Gold medal – first place	1968 Mexico City	K-4 1000 m
Bronze medal – third place	1972 Munich	K-4 1000 m
World Championships
Gold medal – first place	1970 Copenhagen	K-4 10000 m
European Championships
Gold medal – first place	1969 Moscow	K-4 10000 m

Tore Berger (11 November 1944 – 19 May 2026) was a Norwegian sprint canoeist who mostly competed in four-man events.

== Life and career ==
Berger was born in Asker on 11 November 1944. He won a world title in 1970, a European title in 1969, and an Olympic gold medal in 1968, placing third at the 1972 Games.

He won a total of 14 Norwegian titles, including four K1 titles, and won three Nordic titles.

Berger died in Bærum on 19 May 2026, at the age of 81.

== External linls ==
- Tore Berger at Olympedia
- Tore Berger at InterSportStats
