= Zoltán Bakó =

Hungarian canoeist (born 1951)

Medal record

Men's canoe sprint

Olympic Games
Bronze medal – third place	1976 Montreal	K-2 1000 m

World Championships
Gold medal – first place	1973 Tampere	K-2 10000 m
Gold medal – first place	1974 Mexico City	K-2 1000 m
Gold medal – first place	1975 Belgrade	K-2 10000 m
Gold medal – first place	1977 Sofia	K-2 1000 m
Gold medal – first place	1978 Belgrade	K-2 10000 m
Silver medal – second place	1977 Sofia	K-2 10000 m
Silver medal – second place	1979 Duisburg	K-2 1000 m
Bronze medal – third place	1971 Belgrade	K-4 1000 m
Bronze medal – third place	1975 Belgrade	K-4 1000 m
Bronze medal – third place	1978 Belgrade	K-2 1000 m

Zoltán Bakó (born 11 November 1951) is a Hungarian sprint canoeist who competed during the 1970s. Competing in two Summer Olympic Games, he won a bronze medal in the K-2 1000 m event at Montreal in 1976.

Bakó also won ten medals at the ICF Canoe Sprint World Championships with five golds (K-2 1000 m: 1974, 1977; K-2 10000 m: 1973, 1975, 1978), two silvers (K-2 1000 m: 1977, K-2 10000 m: 1979), and three bronzes (K-2 1000 m: 1978, K-4 1000 m: 1971, 1975).
