= Tamás Wichmann =

Hungarian sprint canoer (1948–2020)

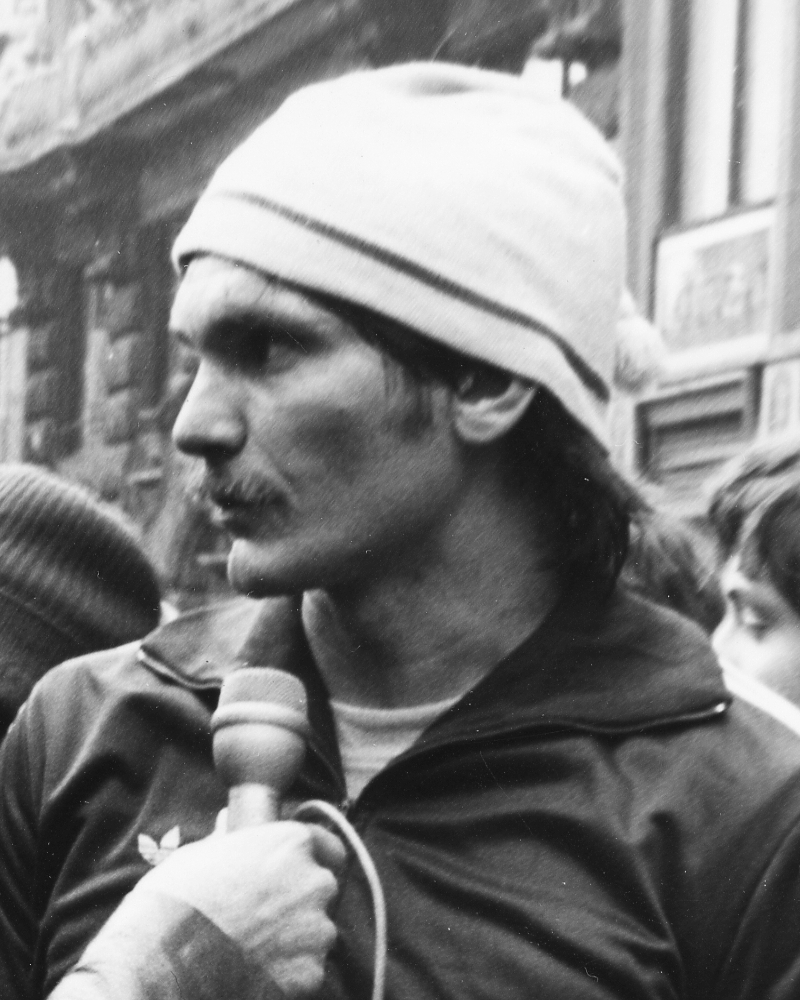
- Wichmann in 1982

Medal record

Men's canoe sprint

Representing Hungary

Olympic Games
Silver medal – second place	1968 Mexico City	C-2 1000 m
Silver medal – second place	1972 Munich	C-1 1000 m
Bronze medal – third place	1976 Montreal	C-1 1000 m

World Championships
Gold medal – first place	1970 Copenhagen	C-1 10000 m
Gold medal – first place	1971 Belgrade	C-1 10000 m
Gold medal – first place	1971 Belgrade	C-2 1000 m
Gold medal – first place	1974 Mexico City	C-1 10000 m
Gold medal – first place	1977 Sofia	C-1 10000 m
Gold medal – first place	1979 Duisburg	C-1 1000 m
Gold medal – first place	1979 Duisburg	C-1 10000 m
Gold medal – first place	1981 Nottingham	C-1 10000 m
Gold medal – first place	1982 Belgrade	C-1 10000 m
Silver medal – second place	1966 East Berlin	C-1 1000 m
Silver medal – second place	1970 Copenhagen	C-2 1000 m
Silver medal – second place	1971 Belgrade	C-1 500 m
Silver medal – second place	1978 Belgrade	C-1 1000 m
Bronze medal – third place	1973 Tampere	C-1 1000 m
Bronze medal – third place	1973 Tampere	C-1 10000 m
Bronze medal – third place	1973 Tampere	C-2 1000 m
Bronze medal – third place	1975 Belgrade	C-1 1000 m
Bronze medal – third place	1983 Tampere	C-1 10000 m

Tamás Wichmann (4 February 1948 – 12 February 2020) was a Hungarian sprint canoeist who competed from 1966 to 1983. Competing in four Summer Olympics, he won three medals. This included two silver (C-1 1000 m: 1972, C-2 1000 m: 1968) and one bronze (C-1 1000 m: 1976).

Wichmann found further success at the ICF Canoe Sprint World Championships, winning a total of 18 medals. This included nine golds (C-1 1000 m: 1979, C-1 10000 m: 1970, 1971, 1974, 1977, 1979, 1981, 1982; C-2 1000 m: 1971), four silvers (C-1 500: 1971, C-1 1000 m: 1966, 1978; C-2 1000 m: 1970), and five bronzes (C-1 1000 m: 1973, 1975; C-1 10000 m: 1973, 1983; C-2 1000 m: 1973).

He was elected Hungarian Sportsman of the year in 1979 after winning two gold medals at that year's World Championships.

Awards
Preceded by Zoltán Magyar	Hungarian Sportsman of The Year; 1979	Succeeded by Zoltán Magyar
