= Egil Søby =

Norwegian canoeist

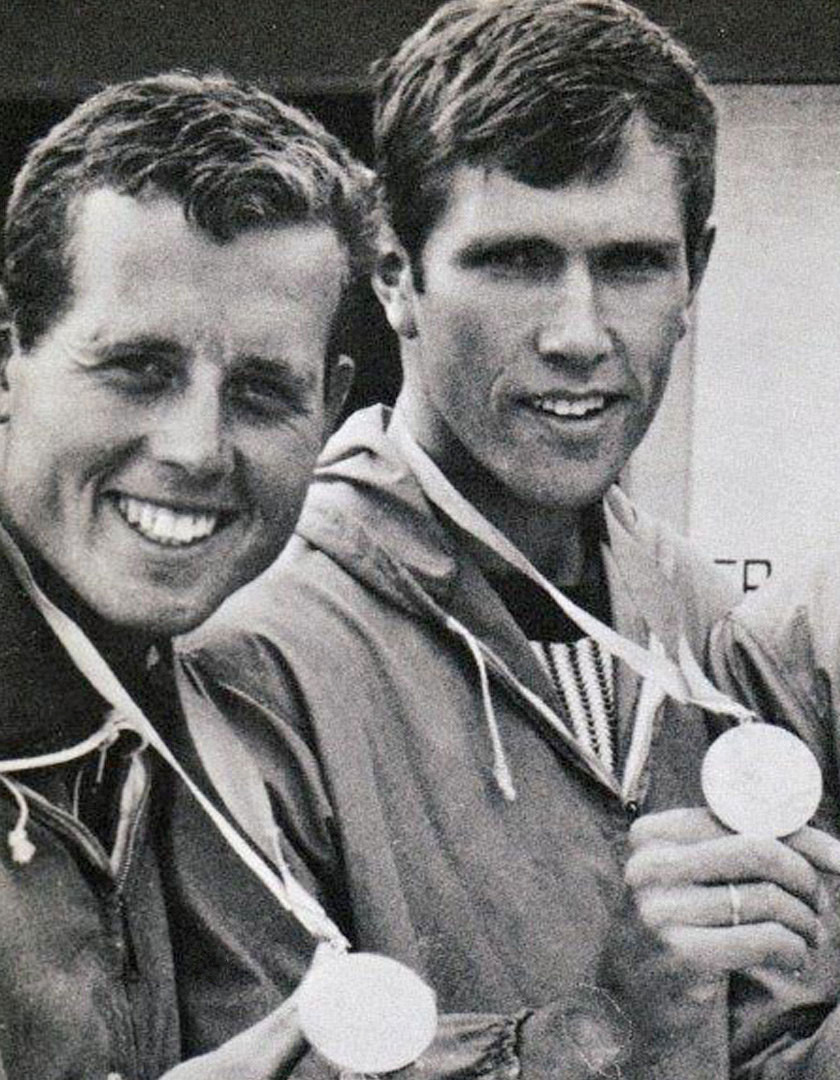
- Søby (right) in 1968

Personal information
- Born: 25 November 1945 (age 80) Tønsberg, Norway
- Height: 195 cm (6 ft 5 in)
- Weight: 90 kg (198 lb)

Sport
- Sport: Canoe racing
- Club: Tønsberg KK
Medal record
Representing Norway
Olympic Games
Gold medal – first place	1968 Mexico City	K-4 1000 m
Bronze medal – third place	1972 Munich	K-4 1000 m
World Championships
Silver medal – second place	1966 East Berlin	K-2 10000 m
Gold medal – first place	1970 Copenhagen	K-4 10000 m
Silver medal – second place	1971 Belgrade	K-2 10000 m
European Championships
Bronze medal – third place	1967 Duisburg	K-1 10000 m
Gold medal – first place	1969 Moscow	K-4 10000 m
Silver medal – second place	1969 Moscow	K-2 10000 m

Egil Vike Søby (born 25 November 1945) is a retired Norwegian sprint canoeist. He competed in the four-man 1000 m sprint at the 1968 and 1972 Olympics and won a gold and a bronze medal, respectively. Between 1966 and 1971 Søby collected six medals in various events at the world and European championships, including two gold medals in K-4 10,000 m.
