= Valeri Didenko =

Soviet canoeist (born 1946)

Medal record

Men's canoe sprint

Olympic Games
Gold medal – first place	1972 Munich	K-4 1000 m

World Championships
Gold medal – first place	1970 Copenhagen	K-4 1000 m
Gold medal – first place	1971 Belgrade	K-4 1000 m
Silver medal – second place	1973 Tampere	K-4 1000 m

Valeri Didenko (born 4 March 1946) is a Soviet sprint canoeist who competed in the early 1970s. He won a gold medal in the K-4 1000 m event at the 1972 Summer Olympics in Munich.

Didenko also won three medals in the K-4 1000 m event at the ICF Canoe Sprint World Championships with two golds (1970, 1971) and a silver (1973).
