= István Szabó (canoeist) =

Hungarian canoeist

Medal record

Men's canoe sprint

Olympic Games
Silver medal – second place	1980 Moscow	K-2 1000 m
Bronze medal – third place	1976 Montreal	K-2 1000 m

World Championships
Gold medal – first place	1971 Belgrade	K-1 4 x 500 m
Gold medal – first place	1974 Mexico City	K-2 1000 m
Gold medal – first place	1975 Belgrade	K-2 10000 m
Gold medal – first place	1977 Sofia	K-2 1000 m
Gold medal – first place	1978 Belgrade	K-2 10000 m
Silver medal – second place	1974 Mexico City	K-4 10000 m
Silver medal – second place	1977 Sofia	K-2 10000 m
Silver medal – second place	1979 Duisburg	K-2 1000 m
Silver medal – second place	1981 Nottingham	K-2 10000 m
Silver medal – second place	1983 Tampere	K-2 10000 m
Silver medal – second place	1985 Mechelen	K-2 10000 m
Bronze medal – third place	1970 Copenhagen	K-4 1000 m
Bronze medal – third place	1971 Belgrade	K-4 1000 m
Bronze medal – third place	1975 Belgrade	K-4 1000 m
Bronze medal – third place	1978 Belgrade	K-2 1000 m
Bronze medal – third place	1982 Belgrade	K-2 10000 m

István Szabó (born 15 June 1950) is a Hungarian sprint canoeist who competed from the early 1970s to the mid-1980s. Competing in three Summer Olympics, he won two medals in the K-2 1000 m event with a silver in 1980 and a bronze in 1976.

Szabó also won sixteen medals at the ICF Canoe Sprint World Championships with five golds (K-1 4 x 500 m: 1971, K-2 1000 m: 1974, 1977; K-2 10000 m: 1975, 1978), six silvers (K-2 1000 m: 1979, K-2 10000 m: 1977, 1981, 1983, 1985, K-4 10000 m: 1974), and five bronzes (K-2 1000 m: 1978, K-2 10000 m: 1982, K-4 1000 m: 1970, 1971, 1975).
