= Lars Andersson (canoeist) =

Swedish sprint canoeist (born 1948)

Medal record

Men's canoe sprint

World Championships
Gold medal – first place	1970 Copenhagen	K-2 500 m
Gold medal – first place	1971 Belgrade	K-2 500 m
Silver medal – second place	1970 Copenhagen	K-1 1000 m
Silver medal – second place	1970 Copenhagen	K-2 1000 m
Silver medal – second place	1971 Belgrade	K-1 1000 m

Lars Ivar Andersson (born 22 November 1948) is a Swedish sprint canoeist who competed from the late 1960s to the late 1970s. He won five medals at the ICF Canoe Sprint World Championships with two golds (K-2 500 m: 1970, 1971) and three silvers (K-1 1000 m: 1970, 1971; K-2 1000 m: 1970).

Andersson also competed in three Summer Olympics, earning his best finish of fifth in the K-2 1000 m event at Mexico City in 1968.
