= 1969 Canoe Sprint European Championships =

International canoeing and kayaking event

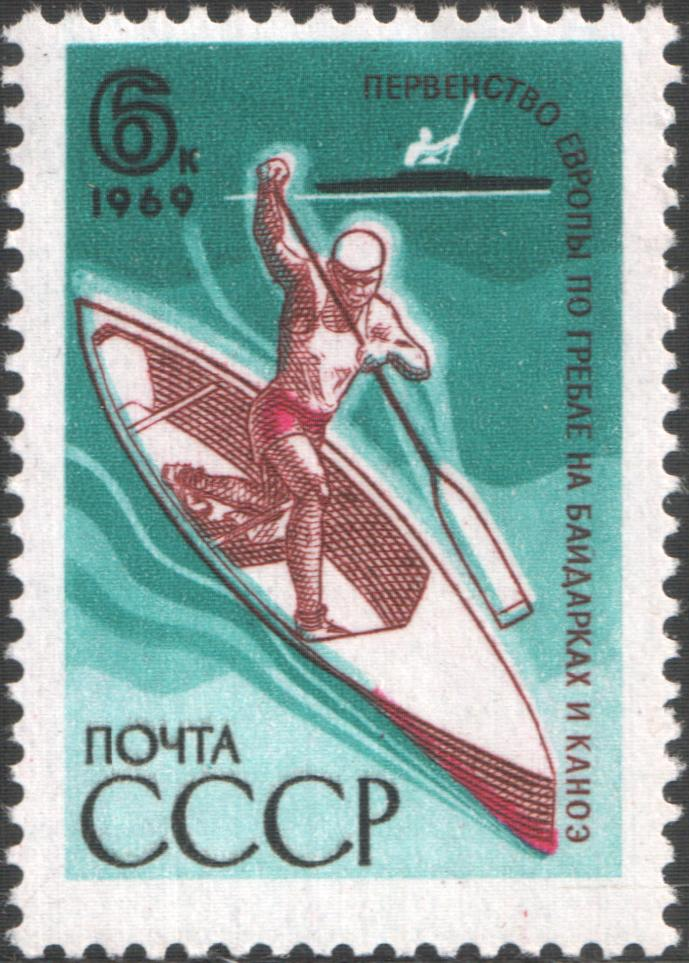
- Location: Moscow, Soviet Union
- Start date: 15 August 1969
- End date: 17 August 1969

The 1969 Canoe Sprint European Championships were held in Moscow, Soviet Union from 15 to 17 August 1969. This was the 10th edition of the event. The men's competition consisted of four canoe and nine kayak events. Three events were held for women, all in kayak.

== Medal overview ==
=== Men's ===
==== Canoe ====
Event	Gold	Time	Silver	Time	Bronze	Time
C-1 1000 m	Tamás Wichmann (HUN)	4:23,80	Nikolay Fedulov (URS)	4:24,25	Tibor Tatai (HUN)	4:25,51
C-1 10000 m	Tamás Wichmann (HUN)	50:10,60	Gyula Petrikovics (HUN)	50:12,80	Ivan Macarenco (ROU)	50:36,40
C-2 1000 m	Romania; Serghei Covaliov; Ivan Patzaichin	3:57,30	Romania; Constantin Manea; Vicol Calabiciov	3:59,02	Soviet Union; Vasiliy Kalyagin; Valeriy Drybas	4:00,62
C-2 10000 m	Hungary; László Hingl; István Cserha	45:46,80	Soviet Union; Naum Prokupets; Mikhail Zamotin	46:13,00	Sweden; Bernt Lindelöf; Erik Zeidlitz	46:49,20

==== Kayak ====
Event	Gold	Time	Silver	Time	Bronze	Time
K-1 500 m	Anatoly Tishchenko (URS)	1:53,57	Aurel Vernescu (ROU)	1:55,19	Anatoly Kaptur (URS)	1:55,45
K-1 1000 m	Aleksandr Shaparenko (URS)	4:02,47	Anatoly Tishchenko (URS)	4:03,00	Lars Andersson (SWE)	4:04,79
K-1 10000 m	Viktor Tsaryov (URS)	44:37,80	Erik Hansen (DEN)	44:59,20	Konstantin Kostenko (URS)	45:08,60
K-1 4 x 500 m relay	Soviet Union; Anatoly Kaptur; Valery Bogatov; Anatoliy Sedasov; Anatoly Tishchenko	7:37,20	Romania; Aurel Vernescu; Ion Jacob; Eugen Botez; Mihai Zafiu	7:40,65	Hungary; Csaba Giczy; Mihály Hesz; István Csizmadia; Imre Szöllősi	7:41,91
K-2 500 m	Romania; Aurel Vernescu; Atanase Sciotnic	1:41,45	Soviet Union; Vladimir Obraztsov; Georgiy Karyukhin	1:42,84	Netherlands; Paul Hoekstra; Jan Wittenberg	1:43,39
K-2 1000 m	Soviet Union; Aleksandr Shaparenko; Vladimir Morozov	3:38,80	Sweden; Lars Andersson; Gunnar Utterberg	3:39,47	Hungary; Csaba Giczy; István Timár	3:40,00
K-2 10000 m	Hungary; Csaba Giczy; István Timár	41:32,20	Norway; Egil Søby; Jan Johansen	41:37,60	Romania; Ștefan Pocora; Vasilie Simiocenco	41:48,00
K-4 1000 m	East Germany; Uwe Will; Eduard Augustin; Joachim Mattern; Peter Ebeling	3:12,03	Romania; Haralambie Ivanov; Atanase Sciotnic; Ion Jacob; Roco Ruzhan	3:13,22	Soviet Union; Aleksandr Shaparenko; Vladimir Morozov; Yuri Stetsenko; Yuri Filatov	3:14,44
K-4 10000 m	Norway; Egil Søby; Jan Johansen; Steinar Amundsen; Tore Berger	36:39,50	Hungary; György Czink; Vilmos Nagy; György Mészáros; Laszlo Fabian	36:48,90	Sweden; Åke Sandin; Willy Tesch; Hans Nilsson; Per Larsson	36:57,50

=== Women's ===
==== Kayak ====
Event	Gold	Time	Silver	Time	Bronze	Time
K-1 500 m	Tamara Shymanskaya (URS)	2:09,45	Renate Breuer (FRG)	2:11,82	Anna Pfeffer (HUN)	2:12,10
K-2 500 m	Soviet Union; Lyudmila Lyaushko; Tamara Shymanskaya	1:56,52	Hungary; Anna Pfeffer; Katalin Hollosy	1:58,81	West Germany; Annemarie Zimmermann; Roswitha Esser	1:59,37
K-4 500 m	Soviet Union; Lyudmila Lyaushko; Tamara Shymanskaya; Natalya Boyko; Ninel Vakula	1:46,70	West Germany; Annemarie Zimmermann; Roswitha Esser; Renate Breuer; Elke Felten	1:47,56	Soviet Union; Galina Kiryanova; Tatiana Malyarenko; Lyubov Beresneva; Lidiya Ivanova	1:49,18

== Medals table ==
Rank	Nation	Gold	Silver	Bronze	Total
1	Soviet Union (URS)	8	4	5	17
2	Hungary (HUN)	4	3	4	11
3	Romania (ROU)	2	4	2	8
4	Norway (NOR)	1	1	0	2
5	East Germany (GDR)	1	0	0	1
6	West Germany (FRG)	0	2	1	3
7	Sweden (SWE)	0	1	3	4
8	Denmark (DEN)	0	1	0	1
9	Netherlands (NED)	0	0	1	1
Totals (9 entries)		16	16	16	48
