= Canoeing at the 1968 Summer Olympics – Men's K-4 1000 metres =

The men's K-4 1000 metres event was a fours kayaking event conducted as part of the Canoeing at the 1968 Summer Olympics program. In the official report, heat results were shown in tenths of a second (0.1) while the remaining events were shown in hundredths of a second (0.01).

== Medalists ==
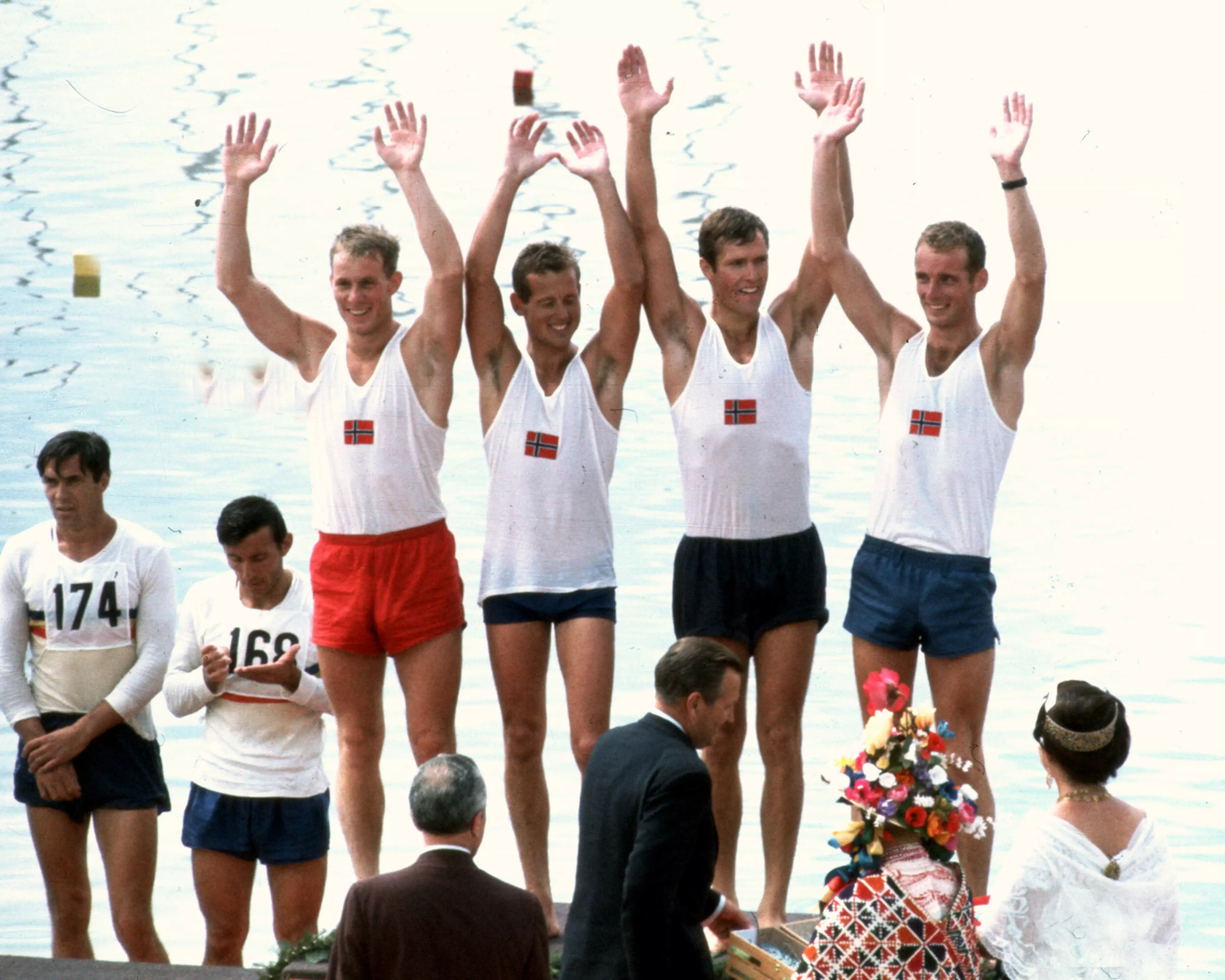
Left-right: Johansen, Berger, Søby, Amundsen

Gold	Silver	Bronze
Norway; Steinar Amundsen; Tore Berger; Egil Søby; Jan Johansen	Romania; Anton Calenic; Haralambie Ivanov; Dimitrie Ivanov; Mihai Țurcaș	Hungary; Csaba Giczy; Imre Szöllősi; István Timár; István Csizmadia

== Results ==
=== Heats ===
The 19 crews first raced in three heats on October 22. The top three finishers from each of the heats advanced directly to the semifinals while the remaining ten teams were relegated to the repechage heats.

Heat 1
1.	Anton Calenic, Dimitrie Ivanov, Haralambie Ivanov, and Mihai Țurcaș (ROU)	3:18.0	QS
2.	Steinar Amundsen, Tore Berger, Egil Søby, and Jan Johansen (NOR)	3:19.6	QS
3.	Karl-Gustav von Alfthan, Heikki Mäkelä, Jorma Lehtosalo, and Ilkka Nummisto (FIN)	3:21.1	QS
4.	Jean Boudehen, Albert Mayer, Jean-Pierre Cordebois, and Claude Picard (FRA)	3:22.6	QR
5.	Harry Sørensen, Jörgen Andersen, Hans Knudsen, and Steen Lund Hansen (DEN)	3:23.3	QR
6.	Phil Coles, Dennis Green, Gordon Jeffery, and Barry Stuart (AUS)	3:27.3	QR
7.	José Perurena, Ángel Villar, Gerardo López, and Pedro Cuesta (ESP)	3:40.4	QR
Heat 2
1.	Csaba Giczy, István Timár, Imre Szöllősi, and István Csizmadia (HUN)	3:18.6	QS
2.	Nikolai Chuzhikov, Yuri Stetsenko, Dmitry Matveyev, and Georgy Karyukhin (URS)	3:18.9	QS
3.	Ewald Janusz, Ryszard Marchlik, Rafał Piszcz, and Władysław Zieliński (POL)	3:21.7	QS
4.	Bernd Guse, Erich Kemnitz, Jochen Schneider, and Erich Suhrbier (FRG)	3:23.8	QR
5.	Antonius Geurts, Jan Wittenberg, Paulus Bunschoten, and Abram Muusse (NED)	3:31.4	QR
6.	Lester Cutler, Ernst Heincke, Mervil Larson, and John Pickett (USA)	3:31.7	QR
Heat 3
1.	Helmut Hediger, Kurt Lindlgruber, Günther Pfaff, and Gerhard Seibold (AUT)	3:21.7	QS
2.	Joachim Wenzke, Klaus-Uwe Will, Erhard Riedrich, and Klaus-Peter Ebeling (GDR)	3:23.5	QS
3.	Per Larsson, Hans Nilsson, Tord Sahlén, and Åke Sandin (SWE)	3:24.5	QS
4.	Alistair Wilson, Alan Edwards, Michael Mean, and John Oliver (GBR)	3:30.5	QR
5.	Carlos Graeff, Luis Lozano, Roberto Heinze, and Carlos Prendes (MEX)	3:37.0	QR
6.	Arpad Simonyik, Wolfgang Ruck, Gabor Joo, and Jean Barre (CAN)	3:39.0	QR

Hansen of Denmark's first name is listed as Jorgen in the official report. In 2008, Spain's Perurena became President of the International Canoe Federation and would become a member of the International Olympic Committee three years later.

=== Repechages ===
Taking place on October 23, three of the top five competitors in each of the two repechages advanced to the semifinals.

Repechage 1
1.	Antonius Geurts, Jan Wittenberg, Paulus Bunschoten, and Abram Muusse (NED)	3:26.86	QS
2.	Jean Boudehen, Albert Mayer, Jean-Pierre Cordebois, and Claude Picard (FRA)	3:28.80	QS
3.	Phil Coles, Dennis Green, Gordon Jeffery, and Barry Stuart (AUS)	3:31.79	QS
4.	Carlos Graeff, Luis Lozano, Roberto Heinze, and Carlos Prendes (MEX)	3:36.90
-	Arpad Simonyik, Wolfgang Ruck, Gabor Joo, and Jean Barre (CAN)	Did not start
Repechage 2
1.	Alistair Wilson, Alan Edwards, Michael Mean, and John Oliver (GBR)	3:26.01	QS
2.	Bernd Guse, Erich Kemnitz, Jochen Schneider, and Erich Suhrbier (FRG)	3:30.58	QS
3.	Harry Sørensen, Jørgen Andersen, Hans Knudsen, and Steen Lund Hansen (DEN)	3:30.92	QS
4.	José Perurena, Ángel Villar, Gerardo López, and Pedro Cuesta (ESP)	3:30.93
5.	Lester Cutler, Ernst Heincke, Mervil Larson, and John Pickett (USA)	3:32.21

=== Semifinals ===
The top three finishers in each of the three semifinals (raced on October 24) advanced to the final.

Semifinal 1
1.	Anton Calenic, Dimitrie Ivanov, Haralambie Ivanov, and Mihai Țurcaș (ROU)	3:19.88	QF
2.	Per Larsson, Hans Nilsson, Tord Sahlén, and Åke Sandin (SWE)	3:20.18	QF
3.	Harry Sørensen, Jørgen Andersen, Hans Knudsen, and Steen Lund Hansen (DEN)	3:21.27	QF
4.	Antonius Geurts, Jan Wittenberg, Paulus Bunschoten, and Abram Muusse (NED)	3:21.60
5.	Nikolai Chuzhikov, Yuri Stetsenko, Dmitry Matveyev, and Georgy Karyukhin (URS)	No time
Semifinal 2
1.	Csaba Giczy, István Timár, Imre Szöllősi, and István Csizmadia (HUN)	3:20.03	QF
2.	Karl-Gustav von Alfthan, Heikki Mäkelä, Jorma Lehtosalo, and Ilkka Nummisto (FIN)	3:21.70	QF
3.	Joachim Wenzke, Klaus-Uwe Will, Erhard Riedrich, and Klaus-Peter Ebeling (GDR)	3:23.30	QF
4.	Phil Coles, Dennis Green, Gordon Jeffery, and Barry Stuart (AUS)	3:24.79
5.	Alistair Wilson, Alan Edwards, Michael Mean, and John Oliver (GBR)	3:25.48
Semifinal 3
1.	Steinar Amundsen, Tore Berger, Egil Søby, and Jan Johansen (NOR)	3:18.29	QF
2.	Helmut Hediger, Kurt Lindlgruber, Günther Pfaff, and Gerhard Seibold (AUT)	3:20.47	QF
3.	Ewald Janusz, Ryszard Marchlik, Rafał Piszcz, and Władysław Zieliński (POL)	3:21.29	QF
4.	Jean Boudehen, Albert Mayer, Jean-Pierre Cordebois, and Claude Picard (FRA)	3:23.51
5.	Bernd Guse, Erich Kemnitz, Jochen Schneider, and Erich Suhrbier (FRG)	3:26.12

=== Final ===
The final was held on October 25.

Gold	Steinar Amundsen, Tore Berger, Egil Søby, and Jan Johansen (NOR)	3:14.38
Silver	Anton Calenic, Dimitrie Ivanov, Haralambie Ivanov, and Mihai Țurcaș (ROU)	3:14.81
Bronze	Csaba Giczy, István Timár, Imre Szöllősi, and István Csizmadia (HUN)	3:15.10
4.	Per Larsson, Hans Nilsson, Tord Sahlén, and Åke Sandin (SWE)	3:16.68
5.	Karl-Gustav von Alfthan, Heikki Mäkelä, Jorma Lehtosalo, and Ilkka Nummisto (FIN)	3:17.28
6.	Joachim Wenzke, Klaus-Uwe Will, Erhard Riedrich, and Klaus-Peter Ebeling (GDR)	3:18.03
7.	Helmut Hediger, Kurt Lindlgruber, Günther Pfaff, and Gerhard Seibold (AUT)	3:18.95
8.	Ewald Janusz, Ryszard Marchlik, Rafał Piszcz, and Władysław Zieliński (POL)	3:22.10
9.	Harry Sørensen, Jørgen Andersen, Hans Knudsen, and Steen Lund Hansen (DEN)	3:25.64

Norway's surprise victory was credited to their trainer Stein Johnson, who had coached previously in athletics, skiing, and speed skating before going into flatwater canoeing. Johnson also finished eighth in the men's discus throw event at the 1948 Summer Olympics in London.
