= Deaths in December 1994 =

The following is a list of notable deaths in December 1994.

Entries for each day are listed alphabetically by surname. A typical entry lists information in the following sequence:

- Name, age, country of citizenship at birth, subsequent country of citizenship (if applicable), reason for notability, cause of death (if known), and reference.

== December 1994 ==
=== 1 ===
- Hugh Chilvers, 92, Australian cricketer.
- Jack Ellis, 65, Canadian politician, member of the House of Commons of Canada (1972-1988).
- Samia Gamal, 70, Egyptian belly dancer and actress.
- Reg Garvin, 82, Australian rules football player.
- William S. Hanna, 71, American politician.
- Max von Hohenlohe, 63, Liechtensteiner Olympic alpine skier (1956).
- Helen McCloy, 90, American writer.
- Ronald Edward Meredith, 48, American district judge (United States District Court for the Western District of Kentucky).
- Calvin Mooers, 75, American computer scientist.

=== 2 ===
- Bogumił Andrzejewski, 72, Polish writer and linguist.
- Jaime Bagúña, 86, Spanish Olympic field hockey player (1928).
- Scotty Cain, 74, American racing driver.
- Julien Davies Cornell, 84, American lawyer who defended pacifist Ezra Pound.
- Miguel M. Delgado, 88, Mexican film director and screenwriter, cancer.
- Orhan Şaik Gökyay, 92, Turkish author.
- John Helwig, 66, American football player (Chicago Bears).
- Alan Splet, 54, American sound designer and sound editor (Eraserhead, Dune, Blue Velvet).
- Reginald Claude Sprigg, 75, Australian geologist and conservationist.

=== 3 ===
- Giorgi Chanturia, 35, Georgian politician and the National Democratic Party leader, homicide.
- Craig Coleman, 33, American artist.
- John E. Henderson, 77, American politician, member of the United States House of Representatives (1955-1961).
- Earl Johnson, 75, American baseball player (Boston Red Sox, Detroit Tigers), scout, and World War II veteran.
- Mihail Lozanov, 83, Bulgarian football player.
- John Wessels, 56, American college basketball player (Illinois Fighting Illini).

=== 4 ===
- Reaves H. Baysinger, 92, American gridiron football player and coach.
- Geoffrey Elton, 73, German-British political and constitutional historian, heart attack.
- Jock Gibson, 73, Australian Olympic fencer (1952).
- Ichiro Ogimura, 62, Japanese table tennis player and coach, lung cancer.
- Julio Ramón Ribeyro, 65, Peruvian writer.
- Rudolf Riedl, 87, Austrian Olympic speed skater (1928).
- Russ Scarritt, 91, American baseball player (Boston Red Sox, Philadelphia Phillies).
- Gertrud Schiller, 89, German writer.
- István Timár, 54, Hungarian canoeist and Olympian (1968).

=== 5 ===
- Woody Abernathy, 79, American baseball player (New York Giants).
- Asım Orhan Barut, 68, Turkish-American theoretical physicist.
- Harry Horner, 84, American art director (The Hustler, The Heiress, They Shoot Horses, Don't They?), Oscar winner (1950, 1962), pneumonia.
- Huiberdina Krul, 72, Dutch Olympic gymnast (1952).
- Günter Meisner, 68, German actor (Willy Wonka & the Chocolate Factory, The Boys from Brazil, The Winds of War).
- Saïd Mohammedi, 81, Algerian politician.
- Rudy Pilous, 80, Canadian ice hockey player and coach (Chicago Black Hawks).
- Dick Rifenburg, 68, American gridiron football player (Detroit Lions), and sports broadcaster.
- E.W. Swackhamer, 67, American television and film director.

=== 6 ===
- Heinz Baas, 72, German football player and manager.
- John Bosak, 72, American basketball player.
- Máire de Paor, 69, Irish historian and archaeologist.
- Otar Gordeli, 66, Georgian musician.
- Marjorie Linton, 77, Canadian swimmer and Olympian (1932).
- Richard Markowitz, 68, American film and television composer (Murder, She Wrote, The Wild Wild West, Police Story).
- Alun Owen, 69, British screenwriter.
- Gian Maria Volonté, 61, Italian actor, heart attack.

=== 7 ===
- Elga Andersen, 59, German actress and singer, cancer.
- William Chalmers, 60, Canadian ice hockey player (New York Rangers).
- Pierre Cloarec, 85, French road bicycle racer.
- Peter Foster, 78, English cricketer.
- Franz Lucas, 83, German SS officer and Auschwitz concentration camp doctor during World War II.
- Edward Rell Madigan, 58, American politician, member of the United States House of Representatives (1973-1991), United States Secretary of Agriculture (1991-1993), lung cancer.
- Poul Byrge Poulsen, 79, Danish Olympic rower (1936).
- Frank Sacka, 70, American baseball player (Washington Senators).
- Freddie Summers, 47, American football player (Cleveland Browns).
- J. C. Tremblay, 55, Canadian ice hockey player (Montreal Canadiens, Quebec Nordiques), kidney cancer.

=== 8 ===
- Antônio Carlos Jobim, 67, Brazilian musician, heart failure.
- Semni Karusou, 96, Greek archaeologist and art historian.
- Enrique Líster, 87, Spanish communist politician and military officer.
- Crawford Nalder, 84, Australian politician.

=== 9 ===
- Antal Apró, 81, Hungarian politician.
- John Joe Barry, 69, Irish middle-distance runner and Olympian (1948).
- Max Bill, 85, Swiss architect, painter and sculptor, heart attack.
- O. C. Fisher, 91, American politician, member of the United States House of Representatives (1943-1974).
- Pat Haggerty, 67, American football official in the National Football League, cancer.
- Garnett Silk, 28, Jamaican reggae musician and Rastafarian, domestic accident.
- Alex Wilson, 87, Canadian sprinter and Olympian (1928, 1932).

=== 10 ===
- Henry Bernard, 82, French architect and urban planner.
- Friedel Dzubas, 79, German-American abstract painter.
- Keith Joseph, 76, British barrister and politician.
- Jiří Marek, 80, Czech publicist, scriptwriter, and writer.
- Veronica DiCarlo Wicker, 64, American district judge (United States District Court for the Eastern District of Louisiana).

=== 11 ===
- Magnus Andersen, 78, Norwegian politician.
- Dionísio Azevedo, 72, Brazilian actor and director, lung cancer.
- Edward A. Craig, 98, United States Marine Corps officer.
- Marian Gobius, 84, Danish sculptor.
- Vera Kuznetsova, 87, Soviet/Russian actress.
- Stanisław Maczek, 102, Polish military officer of World War I and World War II.
- Carl Marzani, 82, American spy.
- Lou Mihajlovich, 69, American football player (Green Bay Packers).
- George Phillips, 73, American gridiron football player (Cleveland Rams).
- Philip Phillips, 94, American archaeologist.
- Yuli Raizman, 90, Soviet/Russian film director, screenwriter.
- Kenneth Rush, 84, American diplomat and ambassador.
- Avet Terterian, 65, Soviet/Armenian composer.
- Yao Yilin, 77, Chinese politician and Vice Premier.

=== 12 ===
- Jerry Green, 58, American football player (Boston Patriots).
- John Hearne, 68, Jamaican writer.
- Jabra Ibrahim Jabra, 75, Palestinian translator.
- Charles Kouyos, 66, French Olympic wrestler (1948, 1952).
- Nicolaas Kuiper, 74, Dutch mathematician.
- Fritz Nikolai, 69, Austrian Olympic footballer (1952).
- Annelise Reenberg, 75, Danish film director.
- Stuart Roosa, 61, American astronaut (Apollo 14), pancreatic cancer.
- Sir Evelyn Shuckburgh, 85, British diplomat.
- Karl Stoiber, 87, Austrian footballer.
- Donna J. Stone, 61, American poet and philanthropist.
- Palle Tillisch, 74, Danish rower and Olympian (1952).
- Frederick Turnovsky, 77, New Zealand businessman and arts advocate.

=== 13 ===
- Glenn M. Anderson, 81, American politician, member of the United States House of Representatives (1969-1993).
- Norman Beaton, 60, British actor, heart attack.
- Claude Curtin, 74, Australian rules footballer.
- Philip S. Foner, 83, American historian.
- Philip Hauser, 85, American academic.
- Robert Weld Mitchell, 79, Canadian politician, member of the House of Commons of Canada (1953-1957).
- Antoine Pinay, 102, French politician and Prime Minister of France.
- Charlie Richard, 53, American football coach.
- Olga Rubtsova, 85, Soviet/Russian chess player.

=== 14 ===
- Orval Faubus, 84, American politician and governor of Arkansas, prostate cancer.
- Edmund Hudleston, 85, British Royal Air Force air marshal.
- Mary Ann McCall, 75, American pop and jazz singer.
- Robert Mersey, 77, American musician, arranger and record producer.
- Lilly Scholz, 91, Austrian figure skater and Olympian (1928).
- Catherine Filene Shouse, 98, American researcher and philanthropist.
- Franco Venturi, 80, Italian historian, essayist and journalist.

=== 15 ===
- Oscar Bidegain, 89, Argentine politician and Olympic sports shooter (1948).
- Boris Chichibabin, 71, Soviet/Russian writer.
- Arthur de la Mare, 80, British diplomat and High Commissioner of Singapore.
- Piero Gardoni, 60, Italian professional footballer.
- Mollie Phillips, 87, British skater and Olympian (1932, 1936).
- Hazel Brannon Smith, 80, American journalist, publisher and Pulitzer Prize winner.
- Harry Tobias, 99, American lyricist.
- Lolesio Tuita, 51, French athlete and Olympian (1972).

=== 16 ===
- Patrick Cobbold, 60, British football executive.
- André Crépin, 87, French Olympic pole vaulter (1936).
- David Dunlap, 84, American Olympic rower (1932).
- Mary Durack, 81, Australian novelist and historian.
- Les Gandar, 75, New Zealand politician.

=== 17 ===
- Pierre Baruzy, 97, French boxing champion and manager.
- Grady W. Courtney, 76, American politician.
- Deon Dreyer, 20, South African recreational scuba diver, drowned.
- Hambardzum Galstyan, 39, Armenian politician and historian, homicide.
- Ella Hval, 90, Norwegian actress.
- Stefano Sertorelli, 82, Italian soldier, skier and Olympian (1936).
- Anton Ström, 84, Swedish Olympic sailor (1936).
- Olavi Talja, 69, Finnish Olympic sprinter (1948, 1952).
- Ajahn Thate, 92, Thai meditation master and buddhist monk.

=== 18 ===
- Roger Apéry, 78, Greek-French mathematician, Parkinson's disease.
- Henry Banks, 81, American racecar driver.
- Phil Bengtson, 81, American gridiron football player and coach (Green Bay Packers, New England Patriots).
- Heinz Bernard, 70, British actor, director and theatre manager.
- Lawrence Russell Dewey, 93, American general.
- Don Fedderson, 81, American television executive.
- David Pitt, Baron Pitt of Hampstead, 81, British politician.
- Peter Hebblethwaite, 64, British priest, journalist, and biographer.
- F. Bradford Morse, 73, American politician, member of the United States House of Representatives (1961-1972).
- Bruno Parovel, 81, Italian Olympic rower (1932).
- Lilia Skala, 98, Austrian-American actress (Lilies of the Field, Flashdance, Charly).
- Suryakantam, 70, Indian actress.

=== 19 ===
- Vera Chaplina, 86, Soviet/Russian children's writer and naturalist.
- Edward J. DeBartolo Sr., 85, American businessman, real estate developer, and hockey team owner (Pittsburgh Penguins), pneumonia.
- Bill Douglass, 71, American jazz drummer.
- Vadim Kozin, 91, Russian tenor and songwriter.
- Noel Pointer, 39, American musician, stroke.
- Gastone Puccioni, 68, Italian Olympic field hockey player (1952).
- K. A. P. Viswanatham, 95, Indian politician.
- Wilson D. Watson, 72, American soldier, Medal of Honor recipient.

=== 20 ===
- Eva Alexanderson, 83, Swedish translator and writer.
- Daniel I. Arnon, 84, Polish-American plant physiologist, heart failure.
- Dirk van den Bosch, 88, Dutch Olympic sports shooter (1936).
- Ted Clayton, 83, South African Olympic cyclist (1936).
- Stephen Coughlan, 83, Irish politician.
- Larry Crawford, 80, American baseball player (Philadelphia Phillies).
- Alexander Felszeghy, 61, Czechoslovak association football player and coach.
- Valeriy Kryvov, 43, Soviet/Ukrainian volleyball player and Olympian (1980).
- Robert Osborn, 90, American satiric cartoonist, illustrator and author (Dilbert Groundloop), bone cancer.
- Cyril Ponnamperuma, 71, Sri Lankan scientist.
- Phelim O'Neill, 2nd Baron Rathcavan, 85, British politician.
- Dean Rusk, 85, American politician and Secretary of State, heart failure.
- Bob Wellman, 69, American baseball player (Philadelphia Athletics), manager and scout.

=== 21 ===
- Göte Almqvist, 73, Swedish ice hockey player and Olympian (1952).
- Butch Hartman, 54, American stock car racing driver, heart attack.
- Mabel Poulton, 93, English actress.
- Audrey Sale-Barker, 91, British aviator and alpine skier.
- Koreya Senda, 90, Japanese stage director and translator, and actor.

=== 22 ===
- Gérard Loiselle, 73, Canadian politician, member of the House of Commons of Canada (1957-1979).
- Nobuko Otowa, 70, Japanese actress, liver cancer.
- Atte Pakkanen, 82, Finnish politician.
- J. A. Todd, 86, English mathematician.

=== 23 ===
- Tony Doyle, 41, Australian politician, AIDS-related complications.
- Mark Foo, 36, Singapore-American surfer, surfing accident.
- Johnny Mince, 82, American swing jazz clarinetist.
- Walter Pektor, 49, Austrian Olympic javelin thrower (1968).
- Sebastian Shaw, 89, English actor (Return of the Jedi) and author.
- Charles Wesley Shilling, 93, American physician and navy officer.
- Teiji Ōmiya, 66, Japanese voice actor, colorectal cancer.

=== 24 ===
- John Boswell, 47, American historian and professor, AIDS-related complications.
- Rossano Brazzi, 78, Italian actor.
- Maurice Chéhab, 89, Lebanese archaeologist and museum curator.
- John T. Dugan, 74, American screenwriter.
- Vera Harsányi, 75, Hungarian Olympic swimmer (1936).
- Julie Haydon, 84, American actress, cancer.
- Antun Lokošek, 74, Yugoslavian footballer.
- Elisabeth Neumann-Viertel, 94, Austrian actress.
- John Osborne, 65, English playwright (Look Back in Anger and actor (Get Carter), diabetes.
- Graham Palmer, 73, British Olympic canoeist (1952).
- André Rasenberg, 80, Dutch Olympic boxer (1936).
- Aleksandr Uvarov, 72, Russian ice hockey player and Olympian (1956).
- Eduardo Orrego Villacorta, 61, Peruvian politician and architect, cancer.

=== 25 ===
- Buddy Ace, 58, American singer, heart attack.
- Henryk Bożek, 70, Polish footballer.
- Ghulam Ahmed Chishti, 89, Pakistani film score composer, heart attack.
- Pierre Dreyfus, 87, French businessman and civil servant.
- Cyril Garnham, 93, British parasitologist.
- Masjkur, 89, Indonesian politician.
- Achille Pintonello, 92, Italian architect.
- Tony Robello, 81, American baseball player (Cincinnati Reds), and scout.
- Zail Singh, 78, Indian politician, President of India, traffic collision.
- Czesław Spychała, 77, Polish tennis player.

=== 26 ===
- Robert Emhardt, 80, American actor (3:10 to Yuma).
- Jock Campbell, Baron Campbell of Eskan, 82, British businessman and peer.
- Hannes Koch, 59, German Olympic racewalker (1960).
- Sylva Koscina, 61, Yugoslav/Croatian actress (Hercules, Judex, The Secret War of Harry Frigg), breast cancer.
- Paul de Lavallaz, 93, Swiss Olympic footballer (1928).
- Kothuku Nanappan, 59, Malayalam film actor.
- Dennis Osadebay, 83, Nigerian politician, poet, and journalist.
- Pietro Pavan, 91, Italian Catholic cardinal.
- Allie Reynolds, 77, American baseball player (Cleveland Indians, New York Yankees).
- Germaine Rouer, 97, French actress.
- Karl Schiller, 83, German scientist and politician.
- Parveen Shakir, 42, Pakistani writer and poet, traffic collision.
- Seetharaman Sundaram, 93, Indian lawyer and yoga as exercise pioneer .
- Rod Thomson, 70, Canadian politician, member of the House of Commons of Canada (1968-1972).
- Edwin Wedge, 83, American Olympic speed skater (1932).
- Peter Weekes, 47, Australian rules footballer.

=== 27 ===
- Winsome Fanny Barker, 87, South African botanist and plant collector.
- Paulus Bunschoten, 61, Dutch Olympic canoeist (1968).
- Fanny Cradock, 85, English restaurant critic, television chef and writer.
- Marjorie Joyner, 98, American businesswoman, philanthropist, and activist.
- Jimmy Kemp, 76, New Zealand cricketer.
- Fred Lewis, 73, American basketball player and coach.
- Peter May, 64, English cricket player and administrator, brain cancer.
- Steve Plytas, 81, British actor.
- J. B. L. Reyes, 92, Filipino jurist.
- Haki Toska, 74, Albanian politician.

=== 28 ===
- Julius Adler, 88, Jewish-American actor and writer.
- Ursula Appolloni, 65, Canadian politician, member of the House of Commons of Canada (1974-1984), lung cancer.
- Georgy Baydukov, 87, Soviet/Russian aircraft test pilot and writer.
- Victor FitzGeorge-Balfour, 81, British Army officer.
- Joseph Holland, 84, American stage actor.
- Gopalaswamy Mahendraraja, 38, Sri Lankan member of Liberation Tigers of Tamil Eelam, executed.
- Arnljot Norwich, 71, Norwegian politician.
- Flavio Tosi, 82, American football player (Boston Redskins).

=== 29 ===
- Woodrow A. Abbott, 75, American officer.
- Robert Barbour, 95, Australian cricket player.
- Bernard Cousino, 92, American inventor.
- Herberts Kušķis, 81, Latvian ice hockey player and Olympian (1936).
- Manuel Mora, 85, Costa Rican politician.
- Jack Rippon, 76, Welsh cricketer.
- Eugen Sigg, 96, Swiss Olympic rower (1924).
- Frank Thring, 68, Australian actor (Ben-Hur, King of Kings, Mad Max Beyond Thunderdome) and theatre director, cancer.

=== 30 ===
- Geoff Bradford, 67, English football player.
- Dmitri Ivanenko, 90, Soviet/Russian physicist.
- Andrei Kuznetsov, 28, Soviet/Russian volleyball player and Olympian (1988, 1992), traffic collision.
- Hap Moran, 93, American gridiron football player.
- Anton Rom, 85, German rower and Olympic champion (1936).
- Maureen Starkey Tigrett, 48, British hairdresser and wife of beatle Ringo Starr, leukemia.
- Xu Yixin, 83, Chinese politician.

=== 31 ===
- Leigh Bowery, 33, Australian performance artist, club promoter, and fashion designer, AIDS-related complications.
- Jacques Dimont, 49, French Olympic fencer (1968).
- Leo Fuchs, 83, Polish-American actor and coupletist.
- Elma Karlowa, 62, Yugoslav/Croatian actress, diabetes.
- Bruno Pezzey, 39, Austrian football player, cardioplegia.
- Jack Shepard, 63, American baseball player (Pittsburgh Pirates).
- Woody Strode, 80, American athlete and actor (Spartacus, The Ten Commandments, Once Upon a Time in the West), lung cancer.
- Harri Webb, 74, Welsh poet, journalist and librarian, stroke.
