= Canoeing at the 1964 Summer Olympics – Men's K-4 1000 metres =

The men's K-4 1000 metres event was a fours kayaking event conducted as part of the Canoeing at the 1964 Summer Olympics programme on Lake Sagami, Japan. This event debuted at these games and is only one of two events that has been at every ICF Canoe Sprint World Championships (the other is the women's K-2 500 m event which made its Olympic debut at the previous Games in Rome).

The preliminary heats were held on 20 October 1964; 15 crews entered and were split into two heats of 8 and 7 fours. The top three placers in each heat advanced to the semifinal, while the remaining eight crews (1 had withdrawn without starting in the heats) had to compete in repechage heats held the same day. There were two repechage heats and three crews to advance from each, resulting in two boats being eliminated in the repechages. Three semifinals, each with four crews, were held, with the top three in each heat to advance to the final and three more teams eliminated. The final was held on 22 October.

== Medalists ==
Gold	Silver	Bronze
Soviet Union; Nikolai Chuzhikov; Anatoli Grishin; Vyacheslav Ionov; Vladimir Morozov	United Team of Germany; Günther Perleberg; Bernhard Schulze; Friedhelm Wentzke; Holger Zander	Romania; Simion Cuciuc; Atanase Sciotnic; Mihai Țurcaș; Aurel Vernescu

== Results ==
=== Heats ===
The 15 crews first raced in two heats on 20 October. The top three finishers from each of the heats advanced directly to the semifinals; one was eliminated due to not starting, and the remaining 8 teams were relegated to the repechage heats.

Heat 1
1.	Simion Cuciuc, Mihai Țurcaș, Atanase Sciotnic, and Aurel Vernescu (ROU)	3:15.17	QS
2.	Nikolai Chuzhikov, Vyacheslav Ionov, Anatoli Grishin, and Vladimir Morozov (URS)	3:18.24	QS
3.	Imre Kemecsey, András Szente, György Mészáros, and Imre Szöllősi (HUN)	3:18.60	QS
4.	Paul Hoekstra, Guillaume Weijzen, Theodorius van Halteren, and Jan Wittenberg (NED)	3:21.15	QR
5.	Stanislaw Jankowiak, Rafal Piszcz, Ryszard Marchlik, and Robert Ruszkowski (POL)	3:28.14	QR
6.	Peter Lawler, Glenn Palmer, Robert Lowery, and Alistair Wilson (GBR)	3:28:59	QR
7.	Kurt Heubusch, Günther Pfaff, Kurt Lindlgruber, and Ernst Severa (AUT)	3:30.54	QR
8.	Izumi Eto, Tomio Sumimoto, Tadamasa Sato, and Yuji Umezawa (JPN)	3:33.25	QR
Heat 2
1.	Günther Perleberg, Friedhelm Wentzke, Bernhard Schulze, and Holger Zander (EUA)	3:17.13	QS
2.	Rolf Peterson, Gunnar Utterberg, Sven-Olov Sjödelius, and Carl von Gerber (SWE)	3:18.79	QS
3.	Dragan Desančić, Aleksandar Kerčov, Vladimir Ignjatijević, and Staniša Radmanović (YUG)	3:20.30	QS
4.	Phil Coles, Dennis McGuire, Dennis Green, and Barry Stuart (AUS)	3:21.20	QR
5.	Claudio Agnisetta, Angelo Pedroni, Cesare Beltrami, and Cesare Zilioli (ITA)	3:25.32	QR
6.	William Jewell, Walter Richards, Tony Ralphs, and William Smoke (USA)	3:35.74	QR
—	Michael Brown, Arpad Simonyik, Gabor Joo, and Paul Stahl (CAN)	Did not start

=== Repechages ===
Three of the four competitors in each of the two repechages advanced to the semifinals.

Repechage 1
1.	Paul Hoekstra, Guillaume Weijzen, Theodorius van Halteren, and Jan Wittenberg (NED)	3:21.04	QS
2.	Claudio Agnisetta, Angelo Pedroni, Cesare Beltrami, and Cesare Zilioli (ITA)	3:21.36	QS
3.	Peter Lawler, Glenn Palmer, Robert Lowery, and Alistair Wilson (GBR)	3:30:44	QS
4.	Izumi Eto, Tomio Sumimoto, Tadamasa Sato, and Yuji Umezawa (JPN)	3:34.68
Repechage 2
1.	Phil Coles, Dennis McGuire, Dennis Green, and Barry Stuart (AUS)	3:22.75	QS
2.	Stanislaw Jankowiak, Rafal Piszcz, Ryszard Marchlik, and Robert Ruszkowski (POL)	3:22.84	QS
3.	Kurt Heubusch, Günther Pfaff, Kurt Lindlgruber, and Ernst Severa (AUT)	3:26.98	QS
4.	William Jewell, Walter Richards, Tony Ralphs, and William Smoke (USA)	3:46.48

=== Semifinals ===
The top three finishers in each of the three semifinals (raced on 21 October) advanced to the final. All other teams were eliminated.

Semifinal 1
1.	Simion Cuciuc, Mihai Țurcaș, Atanase Sciotnic, and Aurel Vernescu (ROU)	3:24.22	QF
2.	Dragan Desančić, Aleksandar Kerčov, Vladimir Ignjatijević, and Staniša Radmanović (YUG)	3:27.84	QF
3.	Phil Coles, Dennis McGuire, Dennis Green, and Barry Stuart (AUS)	3:29.97	QF
4.	Peter Lawler, Glenn Palmer, Robert Lowery, and Alistair Wilson (GBR)	3:33.00
Semifinal 2
1.	Günther Perleberg, Friedhelm Wentzke, Bernhard Schulze, and Holger Zander (EUA)	3:21.01	QF
2.	Imre Kemecsey, András Szente, György Mészáros, and Imre Szöllősi (HUN)	3:24.05	QF
3.	Claudio Agnisetta, Angelo Pedroni, Cesare Beltrami, and Cesare Zilioli (ITA)	3:24.84	QF
4.	Stanislaw Jankowiak, Rafal Piszcz, Ryszard Marchlik, and Robert Ruszkowski (POL)	3:25.43
Semifinal 3
1.	Nikolai Chuzhikov, Vyacheslav Ionov, Anatoli Grishin, and Vladimir Morozov (URS)	3:24.26	QF
2.	Rolf Peterson, Gunnar Utterberg, Sven-Olov Sjödelius, and Carl von Gerber (SWE)	3:25.23	QF
3.	Paul Hoekstra, Guillaume Weijzen, Theodorius van Halteren, and Jan Wittenberg (NED)	3:25.53	QF
4.	Kurt Heubusch, Günther Pfaff, Kurt Lindlgruber, and Ernst Severa (AUT)	3:26.05

=== Final ===
The final was held on 22 October.

Gold	Nikolai Chuzhikov, Vyacheslav Ionov, Anatoli Grishin, and Vladimir Morozov (URS)	3:14.67
Silver	Günther Perleberg, Friedhelm Wentzke, Bernhard Schulze, and Holger Zander (EUA)	3:15.39
Bronze	Simion Cuciuc, Mihai Țurcaș, Atanase Sciotnic, and Aurel Vernescu (ROU)	3:15.51
4.	Imre Kemecsey, András Szente, György Mészáros, and Imre Szöllősi (HUN)	3:16.24
5.	Rolf Peterson, Gunnar Utterberg, Sven-Olov Sjödelius, and Carl von Gerber (SWE)	3:17.47
6.	Claudio Agnisetta, Angelo Pedroni, Cesare Beltrami, and Cesare Zilioli (ITA)	3:19.32
7.	Paul Hoekstra, Guillaume Weijzen, Theodorius van Halteren, and Jan Wittenberg (NED)	3:19.36
8.	Dragan Desančić, Aleksandar Kerčov, Vladimir Ignjatijević, and Staniša Radmanović (YUG)	3:19.79
9.	Phil Coles, Dennis McGuire, Dennis Green, and Barry Stuart (AUS)	3:21.69
