= Canoeing at the 1964 Summer Olympics – Men's K-1 1000 metres =

The men's K-1 1000 metres event was an individual kayaking event conducted as part of the Canoeing at the 1964 Summer Olympics programme on Lake Sagami, Japan.

The preliminary heats were held on 20 October 1964; 19 kayakers entered and were split into three heats of 6 each (with one heat of 7). The top three placers in each heat advanced to the semifinal, while the remaining six crews (4 had withdrawn without starting in the heats) had to compete in repechage heats held the same day. Since there were two repechage heats and three kayakers to advance from each, all of the kayakers who had started in the heats moved on to the semifinals the next day. Three semifinals, each with five kayakers, were held, with the top three in each heat to advance to the final. The final was held on 22 October.

== Medalists ==
Gold	Silver	Bronze
Rolf Peterson (SWE)	Mihály Hesz (HUN)	Aurel Vernescu (ROU)

== Results ==
=== Heats ===
The 19 competitors first raced in three heats on 20 October. The top three finishers from each of the heats advanced directly to the semifinals; four were eliminated due to not starting, and the remaining 6 teams were relegated to the repechage heats.

Heat 1
1.	Erik Hansen (DEN)	4:00.58	QS
2.	Mihály Hesz (HUN)	4:02.90	QS
3.	Rolf Peterson (SWE)	4:04.27	QS
4.	Antonius Geurts (NED)	4:10.68	QR
5.	Ilkka Nummisto (FIN)	4:14.34	QR
6.	Hideo Higashiyama (JPN)	4:17.47	QR
-	Phil Coles (AUS)	Did not start
Heat 2
1.	Aurel Vernescu (ROU)	4:02.06	QS
2.	Erich Suhrbier (EUA)	4:03.44	QS
3.	Günther Pfaff (AUT)	4:07.65	QS
4.	Arpid Simonyik (CAN)	4:12.48	QR
5.	Tony Ralphs (USA)	4:21.53	QR
6.	Fernando Inchauste (BOL)	5:48.74	QR
Heat 3
1.	Władysław Szuszkiewicz (POL)	4:06.48	QS
2.	Alistair Wilson (GBR)	4:09.44	QS
3.	Igor Pissarov (URS)	4:11.91	QS
-	Rene Roels (BEL)	Did not start
-	Georgi Todorov (BUL)	Did not start
-	Cesare Zilioli (ITA)	Did not start

=== Repechages ===
All competitors in the repechages advanced to the semifinals.

Repechage 1
1.	Hideo Higashiyama (JPN)	4:42.93	QS
2.	Antonius Geurts (NED)	4:45.53	QS
3.	Tony Ralphs (USA)	5:09.14	QS
Repechage 2
1.	Arpid Simonyik (CAN)	5:31.18	QS
2.	Ilkka Nummisto (FIN)	5:31.76	QS
3.	Fernando Inchauste (BOL)	6:07.70	QS

=== Semifinals ===
The top three finishers in each of the three semifinals (raced on 21 October) advanced to the final. All other teams were eliminated.

Semifinal 1
1.	Erik Hansen (DEN)	4:03.00	QF
2.	Erich Suhrbier (EUA)	4:04.05	QF
3.	Igor Pissarov (URS)	4:09.95	QF
4.	Hideo Higashiyama (JPN)	4:17.44
—	Fernando Inchauste (BOL)	Did not start
Semifinal 2
1.	Aurel Vernescu (ROU)	4:03.35	QF
2.	Rolf Peterson (SWE)	4:06.97	QF
3.	Alistair Wilson (GBR)	4:07.61	QF
4.	Arpid Simonyik (CAN)	4:13.59
—	Tony Ralphs (USA)	Did not start
Semifinal 3
1.	Günther Pfaff (AUT)	4:03.53	QF
2.	Mihály Hesz (HUN)	4:04.57	QF
3.	Antonius Geurts (NED)	4:05.27	QF
4.	Władysław Szuszkiewicz (POL)	4:08.51
5.	Ilkka Nummisto (FIN)	4:17.47

=== Final ===
The final was held on 22 October.

Gold	Rolf Peterson (SWE)	3:57.13
Silver	Mihály Hesz (HUN)	3:57.28
Bronze	Aurel Vernescu (ROU)	4:00.77
4.	Erich Suhrbier (EUA)	4:01.62
5.	Günther Pfaff (AUT)	4:03.56
6.	Antonius Geurts (NED)	4:04.48
7.	Erik Hansen (DEN)	4:04.72
8.	Alistair Wilson (GBR)	4:05.80
9.	Igor Pissarov (URS)	4:07.67
