= Smoke (surname) =

Smoke is the surname of:

- Albert Smoke (1894–1944), Canadian long-distance runner
- Audra Smoke-Conner (born 1968), Cherokee politician
- Franklin Smoke (1860–1937), Canadian politician
- Jeffrey Smoke (born 1977), American sprint canoer
- Richard Smoke (1944–1995), American historian, and political scientist
- William Smoke (born 1938), American sprint canoer, father of Jeffrey Smoke

== See also ==
- Marcia Jones-Smoke (born 1941), American sprint canoer, former wife of William Smoke and mother of Jeffrey Smoke
- Smoak, surname
