= Canoeing at the 1964 Summer Olympics – Men's K-2 1000 metres =

The men's K-2 1000 metres event was a pairs kayaking event conducted as part of the Canoeing at the 1964 Summer Olympics programme on Lake Sagami, Japan.

The preliminary heats were held on 20 October 1964; 16 pairs entered and were split into two heats of 8 each. The top three placers in each heat advanced to the semifinal, while the remaining eight crews (2 had withdrawn without starting in the heats) had to compete in repechage heats held the same day. There were two repechage heats and three kayakers to advance from each, resulting in two pairs being eliminated in the repechages. Three semifinals, each with four kayakers, were held, with the top three in each heat to advance to the final and three more pairs eliminated. The final was held on 22 October.

== Medalists ==
Gold	Silver	Bronze
Sven-Olov Sjödelius and Gunnar Utterberg (SWE)	Antonius Geurts and Paul Hoekstra (NED)	Heinz Büker and Holger Zander (EUA)

== Results ==
=== Heats ===
The 16 crews first raced in two heats on 20 October. The top three finishers from each of the heats advanced directly to the semifinals; two were eliminated due to not starting, and the remaining 8 teams were relegated to the repechage heats.

Heat 1
1.	Heinz Büker and Holger Zander (EUA)	3:44.25	QS
2.	György Mészáros and Imre Szöllősi (HUN)	3:46.14	QS
3.	Cesare Beltrami and Cesare Zilioli (ITA)	3:46.43	QS
4.	Władysław Zieliński and Stefan Kapłaniak (POL)	3:47.71	QR
5.	Rene Roels and Henri Verbrugghe (BEL)	3:50.07	QR
6.	Gordan Jeffery and Adrian Powell (AUS)	3:50.42	QR
-	Kurt Heubusch and Günther Pfaff (AUT)	Did not start
-	Aleksandar Kerčov and Staniša Radmanović (YUG)	Did not start
Heat 2
1.	Haralambie Ivanov and Vasilie Nicoarǎ (ROU)	3:40.57	QS
2.	Antonius Geurts and Paul Hoekstra (NED)	3:40.67	QS
3.	Sven-Olov Sjödelius and Gunnar Utterberg (SWE)	3:42.65	QS
4.	Erik Kalugin and Ibragim Khasanov (URS)	3:44.66	QR
5.	Preben Jensen and Hans Knudsen (DEN)	3:47.01	QR
6.	Gabor Joo and Michael Brown (CAN)	3:51.57	QR
7.	Tony Ralphs and Gert Grigoleit (USA)	3:54.01	QR
8.	Hideo Kobayashi and Katsufusa Kashimura (JPN)	4:00.94	QR

=== Repechages ===
Three of the four competitors in each of the two repechages advanced to the semifinals.

Repechage 1
1.	Gordan Jeffery and Adrian Powell (AUS)	3:51.19	QS
2.	Preben Jensen and Hans Knudsen (DEN)	3:51.43	QS
3.	Władysław Zieliński and Stefan Kapłaniak (POL)	3:52.49	QS
4.	Tony Ralphs and Gert Grigoleit (USA)	3:54.31
Repechage 2
1.	Erik Kalugin and Ibragim Khasanov (URS)	3:50.20	QS
2.	Gabor Joo and Michael Brown (CAN)	3:53.97	QS
3.	Rene Roels and Henri Verbrugghe (BEL)	3:57.27	QS
4.	Hideo Kobayashi and Katsufusa Kashimura (JPN)	4:03.67

=== Semifinals ===
The top three finishers in each of the three semifinals (raced on 21 October) advanced to the final. All other teams were eliminated.

Semifinal 1
1.	Sven-Olov Sjödelius and Gunnar Utterberg (SWE)	3:45.90	QF
2.	Erik Kalugin and Ibragim Khasanov (URS)	3:46.43	QF
3.	Heinz Büker and Holger Zander (EUA)	3:47.46	QF
4.	Władysław Zieliński and Stefan Kapłaniak (POL)	3:49.24
Semifinal 2
1.	Haralambie Ivanov and Vasilie Nicoarǎ (ROU)	3:49.02	QF
2.	Preben Jensen and Hans Knudsen (DEN)	3:51.20	QF
3.	Cesare Beltrami and Cesare Zilioli (ITA)	3:52.27	QF
4.	Gabor Joo and Michael Brown (CAN)	3:52.90
Semifinal 3
1.	Antonius Geurts and Paul Hoekstra (NED)	3:49.41	QF
2.	Gordan Jeffery and Adrian Powell (AUS)	3:50.98	QF
3.	György Mészáros and Imre Szöllősi (HUN)	3:52.15	QF
4.	Rene Roels and Henri Verbrugghe (BEL)	3:53.66

=== Final ===
The final was held on 22 October.

Gold	Sven-Olov Sjödelius and Gunnar Utterberg (SWE)	3:38.54
Silver	Antonius Geurts and Paul Hoekstra (NED)	3:39.30
Bronze	Heinz Büker and Holger Zander (EUA)	3:40.69
4.	Haralambie Ivanov and Vasilie Nicoarǎ (ROU)	3:41.12
5.	György Mészáros and Imre Szöllősi (HUN)	3:41.39
6.	Cesare Beltrami and Cesare Zilioli (ITA)	3:43.55
7.	Erik Kalugin and Ibragim Khasanov (URS)	3:44.19
8.	Gordan Jeffery and Adrian Powell (AUS)	3:44.52
9.	Preben Jensen and Hans Knudsen (DEN)	3:47.31
