= Canoeing at the 1972 Summer Olympics – Men's K-2 1000 metres =

The men's K-2 1000 metres event was a pairs kayaking event conducted as part of the Canoeing at the 1972 Summer Olympics program.

== Medalists ==
Gold	Silver	Bronze
Nikolai Gorbachev and Viktor Kratasyuk (URS)	József Deme and János Rátkai (HUN)	Władysław Szuszkiewicz and Rafał Piszcz (POL)

== Results ==
=== Heats ===
The 25 crews first raced in three heats on September 5. The top three finishers from each of the heats advanced directly to the semifinals. One was disqualified and the remaining 15 teams were relegated to the repechage heats.

Heat 1
1.	József Deme and János Rátkai (HUN)	3:41.63	QS
2.	Günther Pfaff and Helmut Hediger (AUT)	3:43.34	QS
3.	Vasil Chilingrov and Aleksandar Donkov (BUL)	3:45.06	QS
4.	Jens Sørensen and Jörgen Andersen (DEN)	3:46.32	QR
5.	Jean-Pierre Cordebois and Didier Niquet (FRA)	3:52.12	QR
6.	Adrian Powell and Graham Johnson (AUS)	3:53.23	QR
7.	Herminio Menéndez and José María Esteban (ESP)	3:53.92	QR
8.	Edicto Gilbert and Rogelio Chirino (CUB)	3:57.41	QR
9.	Howard Watkins and Brendan O'Connell (IRL)	3:59.04	QR
Heat 2
1.	Reiner Kurth and Alexander Slatnow (GDR)	3:46.05	QS
2.	Władysław Szuszkiewicz and Rafal Piszcz (POL)	3:48.13	QS
3.	Paolo Malacarne and Francesco De Santis (ITA)	3:50.06	QS
4.	Dennis Barré and Jean Barre (CAN)	3:51.30	QR
5.	Douglas Parnham and Robert Avery (GBR)	3:51.93	QR
6.	Berndt Andersson and Bo Berglund (SWE)	3:54.75	QR
7.	John Brosius and Alan Whitney (USA)	3:55.38	QR
8.	Ivan Ohmut and Miloš Kralj (YUG)	4:23.20	QR
Heat 3
1.	Nikolai Gorbachev and Viktor Kratasyuk (URS)	3:42.18	QS
2.	Coştel Cosniţǎ and Vasile Simiocenco (ROU)	3:43.33	QS
3.	Hans-Jürgen Riemenschneider and Horst Mattern (FRG)	3:45.78	QS
4.	Marc Moens and Herman Naegels (BEL)	3:47.02	QR
5.	Donald Cooper and Tom Dooney (NZL)	3:56.48	QR
6.	Gilberto Soriano and Horacio Flores (MEX)	4:03.99	QR
7.	Barthélemy Koffi Baugré and Paul Gnamia M'Boule (CIV)	4:04.00	QR
-	Terje Wesche and Per Blom (NOR)	DISQ

Norway was disqualified for reasons not given in the official report.

=== Repechages ===
Taking place on September 7, the top three competitors in each of the three repechages advanced to the semifinals.

Repechage 1
1.	Jens Sørensen and Jörgen Andersen (DEN)	3:40.52	QS
2.	Herminio Menéndez and José María Esteban (ESP)	3:40.54	QS
3.	Douglas Parnham and Robert Avery (GBR)	3:40.65	QS
4.	Howard Watkins and Brendan O'Connell (IRL)	3:45.18
5.	Donald Cooper and Tom Dooney (NZL)	3:45.65
6.	Ivan Ohmut and Miloš Kralj (YUG)	3:46.05
Repechage 2
1.	Adrian Powell and Graham Johnson (AUS)	3:41.77	QS
2.	John Brosius and Alan Whitney (USA)	3:47.91	QS
3.	Dennis Barré and Jean Barre (CAN)	3:49.48	QS
4.	Barthélemy Koffi Baugré and Paul Gnamia M'Boule (CIV)	3:54.03
Repechage 3
1.	Jean-Pierre Cordebois and Didier Niquet (FRA)	3:40.44	QS
2.	Marc Moens and Herman Naegels (BEL)	3:41.23	QS
3.	Berndt Andersson and Bo Berglund (SWE)	3:42.93	QS
4.	Edicto Gilbert and Rogelio Chirino (CUB)	3:44.15
5.	Gilberto Soriano and Horacio Flores (MEX)	3:50.61

=== Semifinals ===
The top three finishers in each of the three semifinals (raced on September 8) advanced to the final.

Semifinal 1
1.	József Deme and János Rátkai (HUN)	3:30.71	QF
2.	Władysław Szuszkiewicz and Rafal Piszcz (POL)	3:34.50	QF
3.	Hans-Jürgen Riemenschneider and Horst Mattern (FRG)	3:35.16	QF
4.	Jens Sørensen and Jörgen Andersen (DEN)	3:38.61
5.	Berndt Andersson and Bo Berglund (SWE)	3:41.64
6.	John Brosius and Alan Whitney (USA)	3:46.43
Semifinal 2
1.	Reiner Kurth and Alexander Slatnow (GDR)	3:32.82	QF
2.	Coştel Cosniţǎ and Vasile Simiocenco (ROU)	3:34.60	QF
3.	Vasil Chilingrov and Aleksandar Donkov (BUL)	3:36.39	QF
4.	Adrian Powell and Graham Johnson (AUS)	3:36.40
5.	Douglas Parnham and Robert Avery (GBR)	3:39.36
6.	Marc Moens and Herman Naegels (BEL)	3:42.52
Semifinal 3
1.	Nikolai Gorbachev and Viktor Kratasyuk (URS)	3:30.69	QF
2.	Günther Pfaff and Helmut Hediger (AUT)	3:34.09	QF
3.	Jean-Pierre Cordebois and Didier Niquet (FRA)	3:35.21	QF
4.	Herminio Menéndez and José María Esteban (ESP)	3:35.46
5.	Dennis Barré and Jean Barre (CAN)	3:38.56
6.	Paolo Malacarne and Francesco De Santis (ITA)	3:40.06

=== Final ===
The final was held on September 9.

Gold	Nikolai Gorbachev and Viktor Kratasyuk (URS)	3:31.23
Silver	József Deme and János Rátkai (HUN)	3:32.00
Bronze	Władysław Szuszkiewicz and Rafal Piszcz (POL)	3:33.63
4.	Reiner Kurth and Alexander Slatnow (GDR)	3:34.16
5.	Coştel Cosniţǎ and Vasile Simiocenco (ROU)	3:35.66
6.	Jean-Pierre Cordebois and Didier Niquet (FRA)	3:36.51
7.	Günther Pfaff and Helmut Hediger (AUT)	3:36.61
8.	Hans-Jürgen Riemenschneider and Horst Mattern (FRG)	3:38.67
9.	Vasil Chilingrov and Aleksandar Donkov (BUL)	3:45.40
