= William Jewell =

William Jewell may refer to:

- William Jewell (educator) (1789–1852), American politician, physician and educator, namesake of William Jewell College, Missouri
- William Jewell (cricketer) (1855–1927), English cricketer
- William Jewell (canoeist) (born 1941), American sprint canoer
- William Jewell (footballer) (fl. 1884–1908), English footballer
- William Henry Jewell (1840–1912), mayor of Orlando
- William S. Jewell (1867–1956), American politician and lawyer

== See also ==
- William Jewell College, a four-year college in Missouri
