= Guse (surname) =

Guse is a surname. Notable people with the surname include:

- Bernd Guse (born 1941), West German sprint canoer
- Bruno Guse (born 1939), German boxer
- Kerry-Anne Guse (born 1972), Australian tennis player
- Udo Guse (born 1967), German weightlifter
- Captain William David Guse CD, BSc, CCPA, DMT, (born 1971), RCMS Physician Assistant, United Nations & NATO Veteran
- LTC Steven D. Guse (born 1944), USA Airforce B52 pilot

== See also ==
- Gose (surname)
