= Per Blom =

Per Blom may refer to:

- Per Blom (canoeist) (born 1949), Norwegian sprint canoer
- Per Blom (director) (1946–2013), Norwegian film director
