= Zilioli =

Zilioli is an Italian surname. Notable people with the surname include:

- Cesare Zilioli (born 1938), Italian sprint canoeist
- Gianfranco Zilioli (born 1990), Italian cyclist
- Italo Zilioli (born 1941), Italian cyclist
