= Umezawa =

Umezawa (written: 梅沢 or 梅澤) is a Japanese surname. Notable people with the surname include:

- Hamao Umezawa (梅沢 浜夫; 1914–1986), Japanese scientist
- Haruto Umezawa (梅澤 春人; born 1966), Japanese manga artist
- Hiroomi Umezawa (梅沢 博臣; 1924–1995), Japanese physicist
- Kenichi Umezawa (梅沢 賢一; born 1957), Japanese fencer
- Umezawa Michiharu (梅沢 道治; 1853–1924), Japanese samurai and general
- Minami Umezawa (梅沢 道治; born 1999), Japanese singer and actress
- Yuji Umezawa (梅沢 勇治; born 1945), Japanese sprint canoeist
- Yukari Umezawa (梅沢 由香里; born 1973), Japanese Go player
