= Robert Lowery =

Robert Lowery may refer to:

- Robert Lowery (actor) (1913–1971), American actor
- Robert Lowery (basketball) (born 1987), American basketball player
- Robert Lowery (canoeist) (1937–2024), British canoer who competed in the Summer Olympics
- Robert Lowery (musician) (1931–2016), blues musician
- Robert Newton Lowery (1882–1962), Canadian politician from Manitoba
- Robert O. Lowery (1916–2001), New York City Fire Commissioner
