= Preben Jensen =

Preben Jensen may refer to:

- Preben Jensen (canoeist) (born 1944), Danish sprint canoeist
- Preben Jensen (footballer) (1939–2013), Danish footballer
