= Gose (disambiguation) =

Gose or GOSE may refer to:

- Gose (surname), a surname
- Gose, a German beer style
- Gose, Nara, a city in Nara Prefecture, Japan
- Gosë, a municipality in western Albania
- Gose (river), in Lower Saxony, Germany
- Gose (rapper), an Italian rapper from Rome
- GOSE, signifying a Grand Officer of the Military Order of Saint James of the Sword, a Portuguese order of chivalry
