= Jankowiak =

Jankowiak is a Polish surname. Notable people with the surname include:

- Andy Jankowiak (born 1988), American racing driver
- Sandra Jankowiak (born 1996), Polish sailor
- Stanisław Jankowiak (1941–1999), Polish canoeist
