= Wesche =

Wesche is a surname. Notable people with the name include:

- Maddi Wesche (born 1999), New Zealand shot putter
- Phoebe Wesche (1871–1950) Australian charity worker and clubwoman
- Terje Wesche (born 1947), Norwegian sprint canoer
- Walter Wesché (1857–1910), British composer and entomologist
- Willy Wesche, German World War II oberst

== See also ==
- Wesch
