= Jens Sørensen =

Jens Sørensen may refer to:

- Jens Sørensen (canoeist) (born 1949), Danish canoeist
- Jens Sørensen (cyclist) (born 1941), Danish cyclist
