= Walter Richards =

Walter Richards may refer to:

- Walter Richards (canoeist) (born 1942), American sprint canoer
- Walter Richards (umpire) (1863–1917), English first-class cricketer and Test match umpire
- Walter R. Richards (1904–1991), American football coach, United States Coast Guard officer
