= Malacarne =

Malacarne is an Italian surname. Notable people with the surname include:

- Davide Malacarne (born 1987), Italian cyclist
- Juliana Malacarne (born 1974), American physique competitor
- Lucas Malacarne (born 1988), Argentine footballer
- Paolo Malacarne (born 1947), Italian sprint canoeist
- Simone Malacarne (born 1989), Italian footballer

== See also ==
- Malacarne (film)
