= John Oliver (canoeist) =

British canoeist

John Laurence Oliver (born 12 January 1943) is a British canoe sprinter who competed from the late 1960s to the mid-1970s.

== Early life ==
His father John was a local police sergeant, who served in the Army in Africa in the war, and lived at 69 Westfield Drive in North Greetwell. He attended Monks Road Primary School, being in the cathedral choir, and Rosemary Secondary Modern School, which became St Faith's Middle School. He left at 15 to take GCEs at Lincoln Technical College. He was a soft drinks salesman for four years.

In 1965 he started a three year course at Bishop Grosseteste College, in music. He joined St Peter at Gowts Junior School, which became Bishop King Middle School in 1974.

== Career ==
He teamed with Alan Edwards (canoeist) in 1966.

Laurence Oliver was eliminated in the semifinals of the K-4 1000 m event at the 1968 Summer Olympics in Mexico City. Four years later in Munich, Oliver was eliminated in the repechages of the K-4 1000 m event and in the semifinals of the K-1 1000 m event. At his third and final Summer Olympics in Montreal, he was eliminated in the semifinals of the K-4 1000 m event.

== Personal life ==
He married Beryl Wilson at City Hall in early November 1976. In 1976 he lived at 35 Elm Avenue, in Cherry Willingham.
