= Riemenschneider =

Riemenschneider is a German surname. Notable people with the surname include:

- Albert Riemenschneider (1878–1950), American musician and musicologist
- Hans-Jürgen Riemenschneider (born 1949), German sprint canoer
- Tilman Riemenschneider (c. 1460–1531), German sculptor and woodcarver

== See also ==
- Grauert–Riemenschneider vanishing theorem
- 6145 Riemenschneider, main-belt asteroid
