= Pedroni =

Pedroni is an Italian surname. Notable people with the surname include:

- Alessandro Pedroni (born 1971), Italian footballer
- Angelo Pedroni (canoeist) (born 1943), Italian sprint canoeist
- Franco Pedroni (1926–2001), Italian footballer and manager
- Guido Pedroni (1883–1964), Italian footballer
- José Pedroni (1899–1968), Argentine poet
- Pierpaolo Pedroni (1964–2009), Italian rugby union player, referee and commentator
- Pietro Pedroni (died 1803), Italian painter
- Silvio Pedroni (1918–2003), Italian cyclist
- Simone Pedroni, Italian classical pianist
