= Vakula =

Vakula may refer to:

- Vakula (surname)
- Vakula the Smith, opera by Pyotr Ilyich Tchaikovsky
- Vakula Devi, Hindu goddess
- Vakula Mahadevi, queen regnant in 10th-century India
