= Niquet =

Niquet is a surname. Notable people with the surname include:

- Didier Niquet (born 1949), French sprint canoer
- Hervé Niquet (born 1957), French opera singer and conductor
