= Dmitry Matveyev =

Dmitry Matveyev may refer to:

- Dmitry Matveyev (canoeist)
- Dmitry Matveyev (skier)
