= Angelo Pedroni =

Angelo Pedroni may refer to:

- Angelo Pedroni (canoeist)
- Angelo Pedroni (nuncio)
