= Sumimoto =

Sumimoto (written: 隅本) is a Japanese surname. Notable people with the surname include:

- Tomio Sumimoto (隅本 富夫, born 1945), Japanese sprint canoeist

Sumimoto (written: 澄元) is also a masculine Japanese given name. Notable people with the name include:

- Hosokawa Sumimoto (細川 澄元, 1489–1520), Japanese samurai
