= Karl-Gustav von Alfthan =

Finnish canoeist (born 1945)

Karl-Gustav von Alfthan (born 18 February 1945 in Helsinki) is a Finnish sprint canoer who competed in the late 1960s. At the 1968 Summer Olympics in Mexico City, he finished fifth in the K-4 1000 m event.
