= Dimitrie Ivanov =

Romanian canoeist

Medal record

Men's canoe sprint

Representing Romania

Olympic Games
Silver medal – second place	1968 Mexico City	K-4 1000 m

World Championships
Silver medal – second place	1971 Belgrade	K-1 4 x 500 m

The K-4 crew (from front to back)– Mihai Zafiu, Dimitrie Ivanov, Aurel Vernescu, Ion Negraia.

Dimitrie Ivanov (September 24, 1944 – 1998) was a Romanian sprint canoer who competed in the late 1960s and early 1970s. At the 1968 Summer Olympics in Mexico City, he won a silver medal in the K-4 1000 m event.

Ivanov also won a silver medal in the K-1 4 x 500 m event at the 1971 ICF Canoe Sprint World Championships in Belgrade.
