= Jeffrey Smoke =

American canoeist (born 1977)

Jeffrey Smoke (born December 3, 1977) is an American sprint canoer who competed at the 2004 Summer Olympics in Athens. He finished seventh in the semifinal round of the K-2 1000 m event.

A native of Niles, Michigan, Smoke's parents William and Marcia (since divorced) competed in the Summer Olympics. His father competed at the 1964 Summer Olympics in Tokyo, being eliminated in the second repechage of the K-4 1000 m event. Smoke's mother earned a bronze in the K-1 500 m event at those same games. His aunt, the late Sperry Rademaker, finished seventh in the K-2 500 m event at the 1968 Summer Olympics in Mexico City.
