= Alan Whitney =

American sprint canoer (born 1946)

Alan Whitney (born October 23, 1946) is an American sprint canoer who competed in the early 1970s. He was eliminated in the semifinals of the K-2 1000 m event at the 1972 Summer Olympics in Munich.
