= Theodorius van Halteren =

Dutch canoeist (born 1938)

Theodorius "Theo" van Halteren (born 15 June 1938 in Deventer) is a Dutch sprint canoeist who competed in the mid-1960s. At the 1964 Summer Olympics in Tokyo, he finished seventh in the K-4 1000 m event.
