= Roberto Heinze =

Mexican sprint canoer (born 1946)

Roberto Heinze Hauser (born July 22, 1946) is a Mexican sprint canoer who competed from the late 1960s. He was eliminated in the repechages of the K-4 1000 m event at the 1968 Summer Olympics in Mexico City.
