= Reiner Kurth =

Medal record

Men's canoe sprint

World Championships
Gold medal – first place	1971 Belgrade	K-2 1000 m

Reiner Kurth (born 20 July 1951) is an East German sprint canoeist who competed in the early 1970s. He won a gold medal in the K-2 1000 m event at the 1971 ICF Canoe Sprint World Championships in Belgrade.

Kurth also finished fourth in the K-2 1000 m event at the 1972 Summer Olympics in Munich.
