= Graham Johnson (canoeist) =

Australian canoeist (born 1943)

Personal information
- Nationality: Australian
- Born: November 20, 1943 (age 82) Australia

Sport
- Sport: sprint canoeist
- Event: K-2 1000 m

Achievements and titles
- Olympic finals: 1972 Summer Olympics in Munich – semifinals

Graham Johnson (born 20 November 1943) is an Australian sprint canoeist who competed in the early 1970s. He was eliminated in the semifinals of the K-2 1000 m event at the 1972 Summer Olympics in Munich.
