= John Powell (Australian footballer) =

Australian rules footballer (born 1937)

Personal information
- Full name: John Powell
- Born: 11 March 1937 (age 89)
- Height: 184 cm (6 ft 0 in)
- Weight: 74.5 kg (164 lb)
- Position: Centre

Playing career^{1}
Years	Club	Games (Goals)
1957–59	Collingwood	6 (2)
1960–63	Fitzroy	48 (12)
Total		54 (14)
- ^{1} Playing statistics correct to the end of 1963.

John Powell is a former Australian rules footballer who played with Collingwood and Fitzroy in the Victorian Football League (VFL).

He is the brother of Australian Olympic canoeist Adrian Powell.
