= Mervil Larson =

American canoeist (born 1940)

Mervil Larson (born November 9, 1940) is an American sprint canoer who competed in the late 1960s. He was eliminated in the repechages of the K-4 1000 m event at the 1968 Summer Olympics in Mexico City.
