= Vakula (surname) =

Vakula (Cyrillic: Вакула) is a Belarusian and Ukrainian surname. Notable people with the surname include:

- Ninel Vakula (born 1949), Soviet-Belarusian sprint canoer
- Svetlana Vakula (born 1977), Belarusian sprint canoer
- Vladyslav Vakula (born 1999), Ukrainian football player
