= Harry Sørensen (canoeist) =

Danish canoeist

Harry Sørensen (December 2, 1946 - March 11, 2015) was a Danish sprint canoer who competed in the late 1960s. He finished ninth in the K-4 1000 m event at the 1968 Summer Olympics in Mexico City.
