= Anton Calenic =

Romanian sprint canoeist

Medal record

Men's canoe sprint

Representing Romania

Olympic Games
Silver medal – second place	1968 Mexico City	K-4 1000 m

World Championships
Gold medal – first place	1966 East Berlin	K-4 1000 m

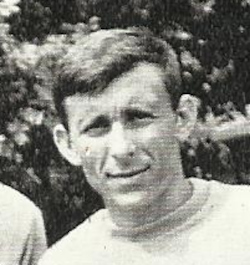
Anton Calenic in 1960

Anton Calenic (born 1 February 1943) is a Romanian sprint canoeist who competed in the late 1960s. At the 1968 Summer Olympics in Mexico City, he won a silver medal in the K-4 1000 m event.

Calenic also won a gold medal in the K-4 1000 m event at the 1966 ICF Canoe Sprint World Championships in East Berlin.
