= Ernst Severa =

Austrian canoeist

Ernst Severa (21 September 1934 – 3 August 2019) was an Austrian who competed in the four man kayak and who competed in the mid-1960s. He was eliminated in the semifinals of the K-4 1000 m event at the 1964 Summer Olympics in Tokyo.
