= Hideo Kobayashi (canoeist) =

Japanese canoeist

Hideo Kobayashi (小林 英男, Kobayashi Hideo; born January 28, 1943) is a Japanese sprint canoer who competed in the mid-1960s. At the 1964 Summer Olympics in Tokyo, he was eliminated in the repechages of the K-2 1000 m event.
