= Ewald Janusz =

Polish sprint canoer (1940–2017)

Ewald Stefan Janusz (13 December 1940 in Czechowice-Dziedzice – 9 June 2017) was a Polish sprint canoer who competed in the late 1960s. He finished eighth in the K-4 1000 m event at the 1968 Summer Olympics in Mexico City.
