= Hideo Higashiyama =

Japanese sprint canoer (born 1942)

Higashiyama Hideo
Personal information
- Native name: 東山日出夫
- Full name: Higashiyama Hideo
- Nationality: Japanese
- Born: May 23, 1942 (age 84)
- Height: 5 ft 7 in (170 cm)
- Weight: 148 lb (67 kg)

Sport
- Country: Japan
- Sport: Sprint canoeing
- Updated on 20 January 2013

Hideo Higashiyama (東山日出夫, Higashiyama Hideo; born May 23, 1942) is a Japanese sprint canoer who competed in the mid-1960s. He was eliminated in the semifinals of the K-1 1000 m event at the 1964 Summer Olympics in Tokyo.
