= Joachim Wenzke =

East German sprint canoer (born 1941)

Joachim Wenzke (born 20 April 1941 in Spremberg) is an East German sprint canoer who competed in the late 1960s. He finished sixth in the K-4 1000 m event at the 1968 Summer Olympics in Mexico City.
