= Dennis McGuire (canoeist) =

Australian canoeist

Dennis McGuire (6 June 1939 – 6 June 1998) was an Australian sprint canoeist and surf ski paddler who competed in the 1960s. He was selected and attended the 1960 Summer Olympics in Rome although he did not compete. He then competed and finished ninth in the K-4 1000 m final at the 1964 Summer Olympics in Tokyo.

He was also prominent in the Australian Surf Life Savings movement in the 1960's & 1970's, particularly in the development of the single and double surf ski events in Sydney, NSW, Dennis won several state and national titles including :

- 1961 Australian Double Ski title with Dennis Green representing the Maroubra SLSC club.
- 1965 Australian Double Ski title with Phil Coles competing for the North Bondi SLSC club.
- 1969 Australian Double Ski title with Phil Coles competing for the North Bondi SLSC club.
