= Tamara Shymanskaya =

Soviet canoeist

Medal record

Women's canoe sprint

World Championships
| Gold medal – first place | 1970 Copenhagen | K-4 500 m |
| Silver medal – second place | 1970 Copenhagen | K-2 500 m |

European Championships
| Gold medal – first place | 1969 Moscow | K-1 500 m |
| Gold medal – first place | 1969 Moscow | K-2 500 m |
| Gold medal – first place | 1969 Moscow | K-4 500 m |

Tamara Shymanskaya (Belarusian: Тамара Мікалаеўна Шыманская; born 27 February 1948) is a Soviet sprint canoer who competed in the late 1960s and the early 1970s. She was born in Minsk. She won two medals at the 1970 ICF Canoe Sprint World Championships in Copenhagen with a gold in the K-4 500 m and a silver in the K-2 500 m events.
