= Erhard Riedrich =

East German sprint canoer

Personal information
- Born: 18 March 1942 (age 84) Eilenburg
- Height: 181 cm (5 ft 11 in)
- Weight: 79 kg (174 lb)

Sport
- Country: East Germany
- Sport: Canoeing

Achievements and titles
- Olympic finals: 1968 Mexico Summer Olympics

Erhard Riedrich (born 19 March 1942) is an East German sprint canoer who competed in the late 1960s. He finished sixth in the K-4 1000 m event at the 1968 Summer Olympics in Mexico City. He won the East German National k1-500 meters title in 1966. And the following year, he won in K2 over the same distance.
