= Hans Berglund =

Swedish canoeist (1918–2006)

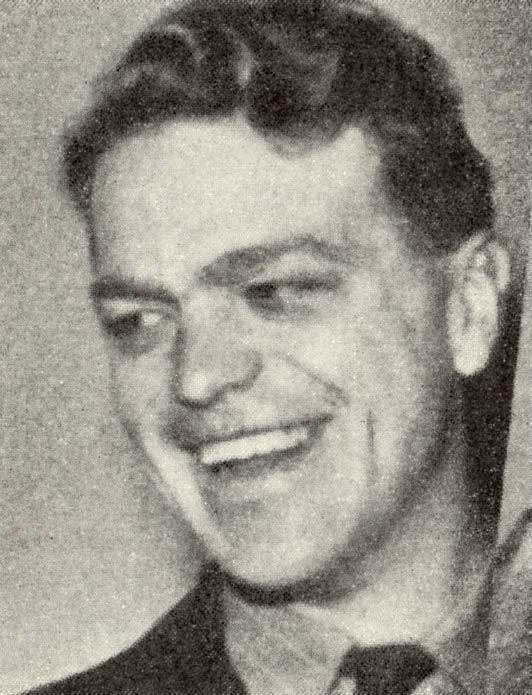

Personal information
- Full name: Hans Gustaf Bo Berglund
- Born: 24 February 1918 Stockholm, Sweden
- Died: 17 September 2006 (aged 88) Hässelby, Stockholm, Sweden

Sport
- Sport: Canoe racing
- Club: Brunnsvikens Kanotklubb, Stockholm
Medal record
Representing Sweden
Olympic Games
Gold medal – first place	1948 London	K-2 1000 m
World Championships
Gold medal – first place	1948 London	K-4 1000 m
Silver medal – second place	1938 Vaxholm	K-2 1000 m

Hans Gustaf Bo Berglund (24 February 1918 – 17 September 2006) was a Swedish sprint canoeist who competed from the late 1930s to the late 1940s. He won the gold in the K-2 1000 m event at the 1948 Summer Olympics in London.

Berglund also won two medals at the ICF Canoe Sprint World Championships with a gold (K-4 1000 m: 1948) and a silver (K-2 1000 m: 1938). Note that the K-4 1000 m event was not part of the Summer Olympics until the 1964 games in Tokyo. It was considered an extraordinary event and was part of the International Canoe Federation's 1948 world championships rather than the 1948 Games.

After retiring from competitions Berglund served as a technical expert for the International Canoe Federation at the 1956 and 1964 Olympics. His son Bo also became an Olympic canoeist.
