= John Pickett (canoeist) =

American canoeist (born 1951)

John Pickett (born March 2, 1951 in Kingston, Pennsylvania) is an American sprint canoer who competed in the late 1960s. He was eliminated in the repechages of the K-4 1000 m event at the 1968 Summer Olympics in Mexico City.
