= Michael Mean =

British sprint canoer (born 1947)

Michael Mean (born 18 February 1947) is a British canoe sprinter who competed in the late 1960s. He was eliminated in the semifinals of the K-4 1000 m event at the 1968 Summer Olympics in Mexico City.
