= Izumi Eto =

Japanese sprint canoer (born 1935)

Izumi Eto (江藤 泉, Etō Izumi; born July 10, 1935) is a Japanese sprint canoer who competed in the 1964 Summer Olympics but was eliminated in the repechages of the K-4 1000 m event.
