= Francesco De Santis =

Italian sprint canoer

Francesco De Santis (born 22 June 1944) is an Italian sprint canoeist who competed in the early 1970s. He was eliminated in the semifinals of K-2 1000 m event at the 1972 Summer Olympics in Munich.
