= Erik Kalugin =

Soviet canoeist

Erik Kalugin (July 26, 1937 – January 26, 2003) was a Soviet sprint canoer who competed in the mid-1960s. At the 1964 Summer Olympics in Tokyo, he finished seventh in the K-2 1000 m event.
