= Steen Lund Hansen =

Danish sprint canoer (born 1943)

- Born: 6 October 1943 (age 83)
- Occupation: Canoeist
- Known for: Canoeing at the 1968 Summer Olympics

Steen Lund Hansen (born 6 October 1943) is a Danish sprint canoeist who competed in the late 1960s. He finished ninth in the K-4 1000 m event at the 1968 Summer Olympics in Mexico City.
