= Glenn Palmer (sprint canoer) =

British sprint canoer (born 1945)

Glenn Palmer (born 17 March 1945) is a British canoe sprinter who competed in the mid-1960s. He was eliminated in the semifinals of the K-4 1000 m event at the 1964 Summer Olympics in Tokyo.
