= Heikki Mäkelä =

Finnish canoeist (1946–2024)

Heikki Mäkelä (19 February 1946 – 29 September 2024) was a Finnish sprint canoeist who competed from the late 1960s to the mid-1970s. Competing in three Summer Olympics, he earned his best finish of fifth in the K-4 1000 m event at Mexico City in 1968. He was born in Lahti.
