= Aleksandar Donkov =

Bulgarian sprint canoer (born 1949)

Aleksandar Donkov (Bulgarian: Александър Донков) (born 27 February 1949) is a Bulgarian sprint canoer who competed in the early 1970s. He finished ninth in the K-2 1000 m event at the 1972 Summer Olympics in Munich.

== See also ==
- Sport in Bulgaria
- Canoe Sprint European Championships
