= Simion Cuciuc =

Romanian sprint canoer

Medal record

Men's canoe sprint

Representing Romania

Olympic Games
Bronze medal – third place	1964 Tokyo	K-4 1000 m

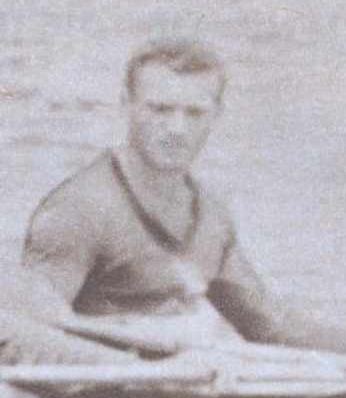
Cuciuc in 1965

Simion Cuciuc (born July 4, 1941) is a Romanian sprint canoer who competed in the mid-1960s. He won a bronze medal in the K-4 1000 m event at the 1964 Summer Olympics in Tokyo.
