= Rogelio Chirino =

Cuban sprint canoer (born 1946)

Rogelio Chirino (born December 23, 1946) is a Cuban sprint canoer who competed in the early 1970s. He was eliminated in the repechages of the K-2 1000 m event at the 1972 Summer Olympics in Munich.
