= Pedro Cuesta =

Spanish sprint canoer (born 1945)

Pedro Cuesta (born 23 March 1945) is a Spanish sprint canoeist who competed during the late 1960s. He was eliminated in the repechages of the K-4 1000 m event at the 1968 Summer Olympics held in Mexico City.
