= Peter Lawler (canoeist) =

British sprint canoer (born 1941)

Peter Lawler (born 25 April 1941) is a British canoe sprinter who competed from the mid-1960s to the early 1970s. He was eliminated in the semifinals of the K-4 1000 m event at the 1964 Summer Olympics in Tokyo. Four years later in Mexico City, Lawler was eliminated in the semifinals of the K-2 1000 m event. At his last Summer Olympics in Munich, he was eliminated in the repechage round of the K-4 1000 m event.
