= Tord Sahlén =

Swedish sprint canoer (born 1937)

Medal record

Men's canoe sprint

World Championships
Silver medal – second place	1963 Jajce	K-2 10000 m

Tord Sahlén (born 17 May 1937) is a Swedish sprint canoer who competed in the mid to late 1960s. He won a silver medal in the K-2 10000 m event at the 1963 ICF Canoe Sprint World Championships in Jajce.

Sahlén also finished fourth in the K-4 1000 m event at the 1968 Summer Olympics in Mexico City.
