= Tom Dooney =

New Zealand canoeist

Tom Dooney (3 August 1939 – 25 May 2018) was a New Zealand sprint canoeist who competed in the early 1970s. He was eliminated in the repechages of K-2 1000 m event at the 1972 Summer Olympics in Munich.
