= Ivan Ohmut =

Ivan Ohmut (born December 5, 1946, in Sremska Mitrovica) is a Yugoslav sprint canoer who competed in the early 1970s. At the 1972 Summer Olympics in Munich, he was eliminated in the repechages of the K-2 1000 m event and the semifinals of the K-4 1000 m event.
