= Barthélemy Koffi Baugré =

Ivorian canoeist (born 1949)

Barthélemy Koffi Baugré (born August 15, 1949) is an Ivorian sprint canoer who competed in the early 1970s. At the 1972 Summer Olympics in Munich, he was eliminated in the repechages of the K-2 1000 m event.
