= Robert Avery =

British sprint canoer

Robin Avery (born 4 December 1948) is a British canoe sprinter who competed in the early 1970s. At the 1972 Summer Olympics in Munich, he was eliminated in the semifinals of the K-2 1000 m event and the repechages of the K-4 1000 m event.
