= Luis Lozano =

Mexican canoeist (born 1945)

Luis Lozano (born August 19, 1945 in Mexico City) is a Mexican sprint canoer who competed from the late 1960s. He was eliminated in the repechages of the K-4 1000 m event at the 1968 Summer Olympics in Mexico City.
