= John Brosius =

American sprint canoer (born 1940)

John Brosius (born February 27, 1940) is an American sprint canoer who competed in the early 1970s. He was eliminated in the semifinals of the K-2 1000 m event at the 1972 Summer Olympics in Munich.
