= Bo Berglund (canoeist) =

Swedish sprint canoeist (born 1948)

Hans Bo Berglund (born 26 March 1948) is a Swedish sprint canoeist who competed in the early 1970s. He was eliminated in the semifinals of the K-2 1000 m event at the 1972 Summer Olympics in Munich.

Berglund's father, Hans, won gold in the K-2 1000 m event at the 1948 Summer Olympics in London.
