= Mihai Țurcaș =

Romanian sprint canoeist

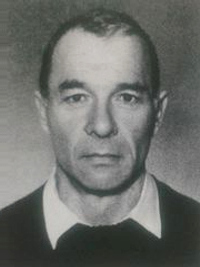

Personal information
- Born: 18 November 1942 Braşov, Romania
- Died: 24 December 2002 (aged 60) Bucharest, Romania
- Height: 181 cm (5 ft 11 in)
- Weight: 84 kg (185 lb)

Sport
- Sport: Canoe sprint
- Club: Dinamo Bucharest
Medal record
Representing Romania
Olympic Games
Bronze medal – third place	1964 Tokyo	K-4 1000 m
Silver medal – second place	1968 Mexico City	K-4 1000 m
World Championships
Gold medal – first place	1966 East Berlin	K-4 1000 m
European Championships
Silver medal – second place	1965 Bucharest	K-4 1000 m
Gold medal – first place	1967 Dusiburg	K-1 4×500 m
Gold medal – first place	1967 Dusiburg	K-4 1000 m

Mihai Țurcaș (born 18 November 1942 – d. 22 December 2002) was a Romanian sprint canoeist. Competing in the four-man 1000 m event (K-4 1000 m) he won the world title in 1966, the European title in 1967, and two Olympic medals in 1964 and 1968. After retiring from competition he worked as a kayaking coach and was involved with the national junior and senior teams between 1990 and 1992.
