= Claudio Agnisetta =

Italian sprint canoer

Claudio Agnisetta (born 29 December 1943) is an Italian canoe sprinter who competed in the mid-1960s. He finished sixth in the K-4 1000 m event at the 1964 Summer Olympics in Tokyo. He was born in Rome.
