= Vladimir Ignjatijević =

Yugoslav canoeist (born 1941)

Vladimir Ignjatijević (born May 6, 1941) is a Yugoslav sprint canoer who competed in the mid-1960s. He finished eighth in the K-4 1000 m event at the 1964 Summer Olympics in Tokyo. He won multiple Yugoslav titles and was described as one of his country's "famous" canoeists in the 1960s.
