= Cesare Beltrami =

Italian sprint canoer

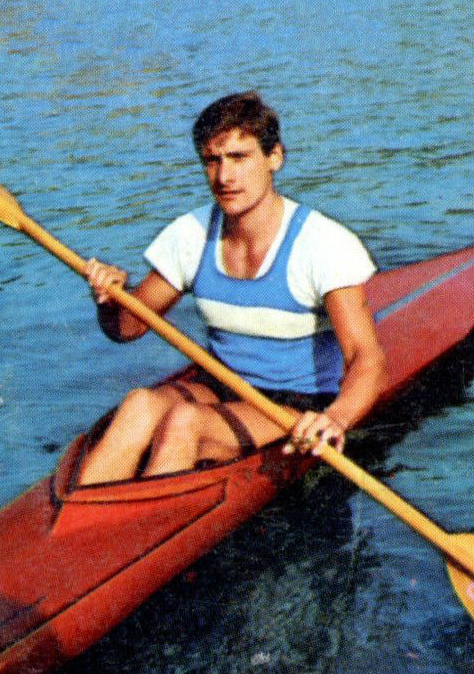

Personal information
- Born: 27 December 1942 (age 83) Cremona, Italy
- Height: 1.78 m (5 ft 10 in)
- Weight: 70 kg (150 lb)

Sport
- Sport: Slalom canoeing
- Club: Canottieri Leonida Bissolati, Cremona

Cesare Beltrami (born 27 December 1942) is an Italian canoe sprinter. He competed at the 1964 and 1968 Summer Olympics and finished sixth twice in 1964: in the K-2 1000 m and K-4 1000 m events.
