= Nikolai Gorbachev =

Soviet-born Belarusian sprint canoer (1948–2019)

Medal record

Men's canoe sprint

Olympic Games
Gold medal – first place	1972 Munich	K-2 1000 m

World Championships
Gold medal – first place	1974 Mexico City	K-4 10000 m
Bronze medal – third place	1971 Belgrade	K-4 10000 m
Bronze medal – third place	1975 Belgrade	K-4 10000 m

Nikolai Stepanovich Gorbachev (Russian: Николай Степанович Горбачёв, Belarusian: Мікалай Сцяпанавіч Гарбачоў; May 15, 1948 – April 9, 2019) was a Soviet-born Belarusian sprint canoer who competed in the early to mid-1970s. He won a gold medal in the K-2 1000 m event at the 1972 Summer Olympics in Munich.

Gorbachev also won three medals in the K-4 10000 m event at the ICF Canoe Sprint World Championships with a gold (1974) and two bronzes (1971, 1975).
