= José Perurena =

Spanish canoeist

José Perurena López (born 4 April 1945) is a Spanish sprint canoeist who competed in the 1960s. He was eliminated in the repechages of the K-4 1000 m event at the 1968 Summer Olympics in Mexico City.

Since 2008, Perurena has been president of the International Canoe Federation.

In July 2011, he became a member of the International Olympic Committee and in April 2014, he became the president of the International World Games Association. In August 2015, after exceeding the age limit of 70 years, he was granted a four-year extension on the International Olympic Committee linked to his International World Games Association presidency, which would come to an end in 2019.
