= Viktor Kratasyuk =

Olympic medal record

Men's canoe sprint
Gold medal – first place	1972 Munich	K-2 1000 m

Viktor Ivanovich Kratasyuk (Russian: Виктор Иванович Кратасюк; January 30, 1949 – March 18, 2003) was a Soviet-born Georgian sprint canoer who competed in the early 1970s. He won a gold medal in the K-2 1000 m event at the 1972 Summer Olympics in Munich.

Born in Poti, Georgian SSR.
