= Erich Kemnitz =

German canoeist

Medal record

Men's canoe sprint

World Championships
Silver medal – second place	1970 Copenhagen	K-4 10000 m

Erich Kemnitz (born 19 January 1936 in Berlin) is a retired West German sprint canoer who competed in the late 1960s and early 1970s. He won a silver medal in the K-4 10000 m event at the 1970 ICF Canoe Sprint World Championships in Copenhagen.

Kemnitz also competed in the K-4 1000 m event at the 1968 Summer Olympics in Mexico City, but was eliminated in the semifinals.
