= Marcia Jones-Smoke =

American canoeist (born 1941)

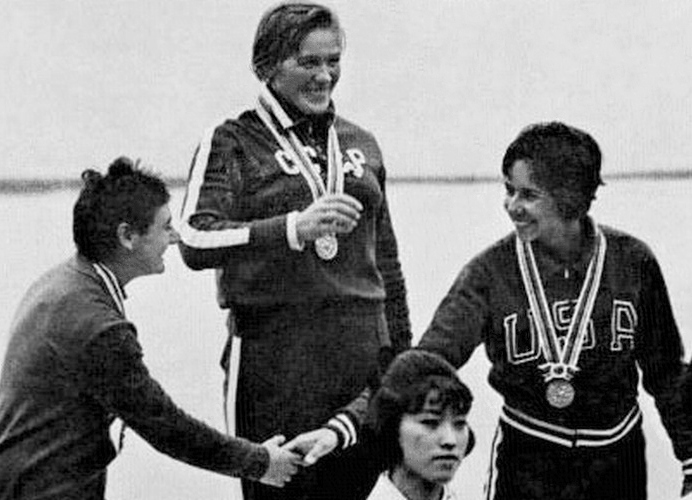
- Jones (right) at the 1964 Olympics

Personal information
- Born: July 18, 1941 (age 85) Oklahoma City, Oklahoma, U.S.
- Height: 169 cm (5 ft 7 in)
- Weight: 61 kg (134 lb)

Sport
- Sport: Canoe sprint
- Club: Niles Kayak Club
Medal record
Representing United States
Olympic Games
Bronze medal – third place	1964 Tokyo	K-1 500 m
Pan American Games
Gold medal – first place	1967 Winnipeg	K-1 500 m
Gold medal – first place	1967 Winnipeg	K-2 500 m
Gold medal – first place	1967 Winnipeg	K-4 500 m

Marcia Ingram Jones Smoke (born July 18, 1941) is an American sprint canoer. She competed at the 1964, 1968 and 1972 Olympics and won a bronze medal in the K-1 500 m event in 1964.

A native of Oklahoma City, Oklahoma, Jones graduated from Michigan State University. She won three gold medals at the 1967 Pan American Games and a record 35 national championships and 24 North American championships.

Her husband, William Smoke, finished fourth in the second repechage event of the K-4 1000 m at the 1964 Summer Olympics in Tokyo. Jones' son, Jeff, finished seventh in the K-2 1000 m semifinal at the 2004 Summer Olympics in Athens. Her sister, the late Sperry Rademaker, finished seventh in the K-2 500 m event at the 1968 Summer Olympics in Mexico City.
