= Gert Grigoleit =

American sprint canoer

Gert Grigoleit (July 12, 1927 – April 25, 2017) was an American sprint canoer who competed in the mid-1960s. At the 1964 Summer Olympics in Tokyo, he was eliminated in the repechages of the K-2 1000 m event.
