= Carl von Gerber =

Swedish canoeist (1931–2013)

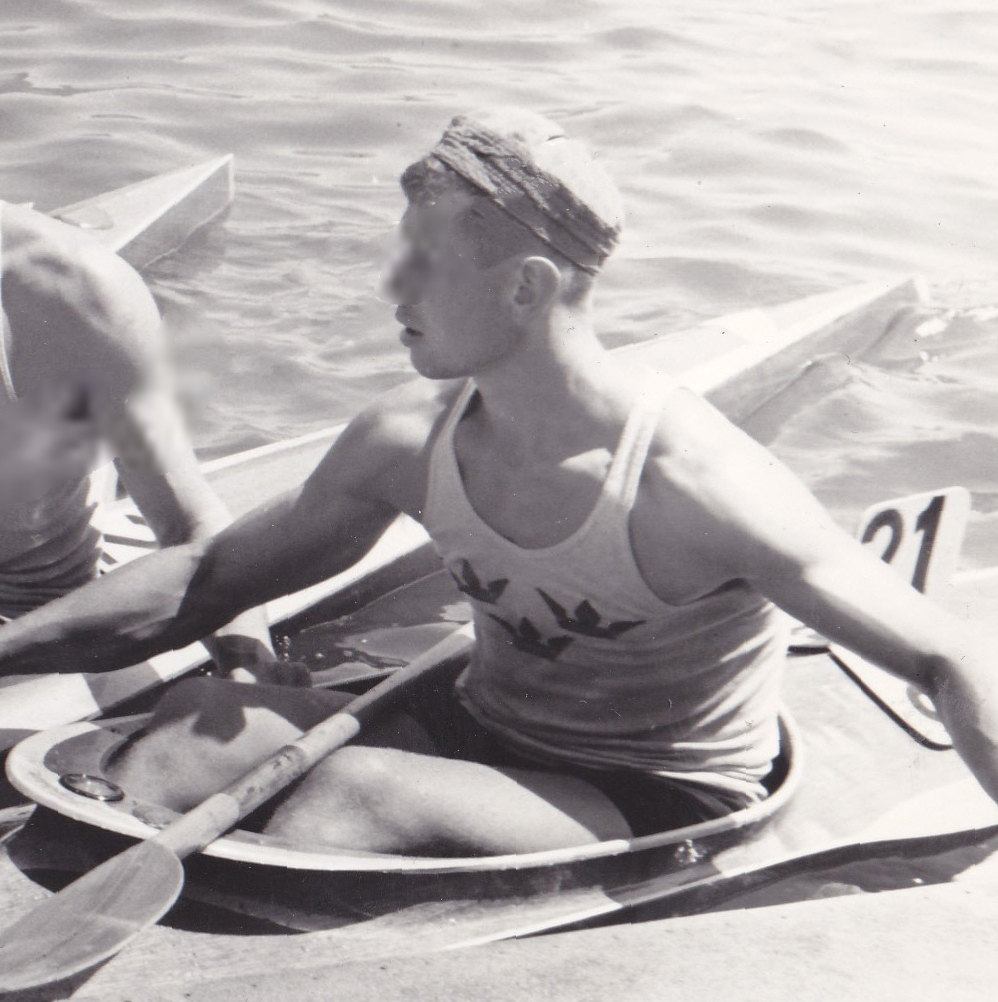
- Carl von Gerber at the 1960 Olympics

Personal information
- Born: 23 August 1931 Västervik, Sweden
- Died: 8 September 2013 (aged 82) Stockholm, Sweden
- Height: 1.74 m (5 ft 9 in)
- Weight: 70 kg (150 lb)

Sport
- Sport: Canoe racing
- Club: Stockholms KK; Brunnsvikens Kanotklubb, Stockholm

Carl von Gerber (23 August 1931 – 8 September 2013) was a Swedish canoe sprinter. He competed at the 1960 and 1964 Olympics with the best result of fifth in the K-4 1000 m event in 1964. He won a bronze medal in the K-1 4 x 500 m event at the 1958 ICF Canoe Sprint World Championships in Prague.
