= Miloš Kralj =

Yugoslav sprint canoer

Miloš Kralj (born 26 October 1946) is a Yugoslav sprint canoer who competed in the early 1970s. At the 1972 Summer Olympics in Munich, he was eliminated in the repechages of the K-2 1000 m event and the semifinals of the K-4 1000 m event.
