= Helmut Hediger =

Austrian sprint canoeist (born 1945)

Medal record

Men's canoe sprint

World Championships
Silver medal – second place	1966 East Berlin	K-4 1000 m

Helmut Hediger (Klosterneuburg, 3 May 1945) is an Austrian sprint canoeist who competed in the late 1960s and early 1970s. He won a silver medal in the K-4 1000 m event at the 1966 ICF Canoe Sprint World Championships in East Berlin.

Hediger also competed in two Summer Olympics, earning his best finish of seventh twice (K-2 1000 m: 1972, K-4 1000 m: 1968).
