= Wolf Ruck =

Canadian canoeist

Wolfgang Ruck (born June 23, 1946) is a Canadian sprint canoer who competed in the late 1960s. He advanced to the repechages of the K-4 1000 m event at the 1968 Summer Olympics in Mexico City, but Canada's K-4 was withdrawn on account of a scheduling conflict and a dire shortage of crew. Canada entered only four athletes to compete in the three Men's Kayaking events (K-1, K-2 and K-4). In the preliminary round, the starting times for the heats in these three events were sufficiently spaced to give some recovery time and thereby permit Canada to crew the K-1, K-2 and K-4 boats. In Canada's repechage round, however, the K-4s were lined up at the start just as the K-2's were crossing the finish line. In the result, Canada's K-4 would have had to miss the start waiting for their (exhausted) K-2 crew to make their way back to the starting line for the K-4 race. For this reason, Canada's K-4 was scratched from the repechage event. Needless to say, lack of foresight and planning on the part of Canada's Canoeing Team management in sending only four paddlers to compete in three events proved the old adage: "penny-wise and pound-foolish".
