= Horacio Flores =

Mexican sprint canoer (born 1951)

Horacio Flores (born April 19, 1951) is a Mexican sprint canoer who competed in the early 1970s. He was eliminated in the repechages of both the K-2 1000 m and K-4 1000 m events at the 1972 Summer Olympics in Munich.
