= Wesch =

Wesch is a surname. Notable people with the surname include:

- Michael Wesch, American cultural anthropologist
- Wilfried Wesch (1940–2024), German racewalker

== See also ==
- Wesche
