= Robert Ruszkowski =

Polish canoeist

Robert Andrzej Ruszkowski (June 9, 1942 – July 16, 1998) was a Polish sprint canoer who competed in the mid-1960s. He was eliminated in the semifinals of the K-4 1000 m at the 1964 Summer Olympics in Tokyo. He was born in Warsaw.
