= Smoak =

Smoak is a surname. Notable people with the name include:

- Gerald C. Smoak (1930–2018), American politician
- Jim Smoak (born 1934), American bluegrass and country music banjo player
- John Richard Smoak Jr. (born 1943), American judge
- Justin Smoak (born 1986), American baseball player
- Marion Hartzog Smoak (1916–2020), American attorney and politician

== Fictional characters ==
- Felicity Smoak, DC Comics character
- Felicity Smoak (Arrowverse) character from The CW's Arrowverse franchise

== See also ==
- Smoke (surname)
