= Carlos Prendes =

Mexican sprint canoer (born 1940)

Carlos Prendes (born July 19, 1940) is a Mexican sprint canoer who competed from the late 1960s. He was eliminated in the repechages of the K-4 1000 m event at the 1968 Summer Olympics in Mexico City.
