= Gerardo López (canoer) =

Spanish canoeist

Gerardo López Espejo (Note: In this Spanish name, the first or paternal surname is López and the second or maternal family name is Espejo.) (born 6 September 1947) is a Spanish sprint canoer who competed in the late 1960s. He was eliminated in the repechages of the K-4 1000 m event at the 1968 Summer Olympics in Mexico City.
