= Carlos Graeff =

Mexican canoeist (born 1947)

Carlos Graeff (born September 1, 1947) is a Mexican sprint canoer who competed from the late 1960s. He was eliminated in the repechages of the K-4 1000 m event at the 1968 Summer Olympics in Mexico City.
