= Jorma Lehtosalo =

Finnish canoeist

Jorma Lehtosalo (born 23 June 1945 in Helsinki) is a Finnish sprint canoer and coach who competed in the late 1960s and early 1970s. Competing in two Summer Olympics, he earned his best finish of fifth in the K-4 1000 m event at Mexico City in 1968, and placed seventh in the K-4 1000 at the 1972 Munich Summer Olympics.

He has won more than 15 Finnish championships in sprint canoe. Lehtosalo competed also in modern pentathlon before choosing kayaking in the late 1960’s. Lehtosalo was Head coach of the Finnish Swimming Federation 1974-1976, Head coach of the Finnish Biathlon Federation 1976-1980 and Head Coach of the Finnish Canoe Federation 1987-2003.
