= Bernhard Schulze =

German canoeist

Olympic medal record

Men's canoe sprint
Silver medal – second place	1964 Tokyo	K-4 1000 m

Bernhard "Berni" Schulze (born 20 May 1938) is a German sprint canoer who competed in the early 1960s. Competing in two Summer Olympics, he won a silver medal in the K-4 1000 m event at Tokyo in 1964.
