= Lester Cutler =

American sprint canoer (born 1940)

Lester Cutler (born September 21, 1940 in Whittier, California) is an American sprint canoer who competed in the late 1960s. He was eliminated in the repechages of the K-4 1000 m event at the 1968 Summer Olympics in Mexico City.
