= Abram Muusse =

Dutch sprint canoer (born 1946)

Abram "Bram" Muusse (born 4 August 1946, Zaandam) is a Dutch sprint canoer who competed in the late 1960s. He was eliminated in the semifinals of the K-4 1000 m event at the 1968 Summer Olympics in Mexico City.
