= René Roels =

Belgian sprint canoer (born 1937)

René Roels (3 September 1937 – 28 January 2023) was a Belgian canoe sprinter who competed in the mid-1960s. At the 1964 Summer Olympics, he was eliminated in the semifinals of the K-2 1000 m event while withdrawing prior to the heats of the K-1 1000 m event. He was born in Sint-Niklaas, Oost-Vlaanderen.
