= Horst Mattern =

Medal record

Men's canoe sprint

World Championships
Silver medal – second place	1970 Copenhagen	K-4 10000 m
Silver medal – second place	1973 Tampere	K-4 10000 m

Horst Mattern (born 4 November 1943) is a West German sprint canoer who competed from the late 1960s to the mid-1970s. He won two silver medals in the K-4 10000 m event at the ICF Canoe Sprint World Championships, earning them in 1970 and 1973.

Mattern also competed in two Summer Olympics, earning his best finish of eighth in the K-2 1000 m event at Munich in 1972.
