= Guillaume Weijzen =

Dutch canoer

Guillaume Hendrik "Chick" Weijzen (born 21 January 1935, Maastricht) is a Dutch sprint canoer who competed in the early to mid-1960s. Competing in two Summer Olympics, he earned his best finish of seventh in the K-4 1000 m event at Tokyo in 1964.

Weijzen's son, Marc, competed in canoeing for the Netherlands at the 1992 Summer Olympics in Barcelona.
