= Lyudmila Bezrukova =

Soviet canoeist

Medal record

Women's canoe sprint

World Championships
Gold medal – first place	1970 Copenhagen	K-4 500 m
Silver medal – second place	1970 Copenhagen	K-2 500 m

European Championships
Gold medal – first place	1969 Moscow	K-2 500 m
Gold medal – first place	1969 Moscow	K-4 500 m

Lyudmila Bezrukova (Russian: Людмила Безрукова, née Lyaushko; born 24 April 1945 in Luga) is a former Soviet sprint canoer who competed in the early 1970s. She won two medals at the 1970 ICF Canoe Sprint World Championships in Copenhagen with a gold in the K-4 500 m and a silver in the K-2 500 m events.
