= Ernst Heincke =

American canoeist

Ernst Heincke (November 19, 1931 – March 8, 2015) was a German born American sprint canoer who competed in the late 1960s. He was eliminated in the repechages of the K-4 1000 m event at the 1968 Summer Olympics in Mexico City.
