= Tony Ralphs =

American canoeist

Tony Ralphs (born December 11, 1943) is an American sprint canoer who competed in the mid-1960s. He founded an orphanage in Tijuana, Mexico. The orphanage he founded, Casa Hogar de Los Ninos, not only acts as a flourishing orphanage, but also hosts groups of volunteers year round, including high school volunteers from First Presbyterian Church Spokane Washington each spring when they travel to Tijuana to build houses in the adjacent surrounding communities. At the 1964 Summer Olympics in Tokyo, he was eliminated in the repechage round of all three events he competed (K-1 1000 m, K-2 1000 m, K-4 1000 m).
