= Claude Picard =

French sprint canoer (born 1938)

Claude Picard (born 29 December 1938) is a French sprint canoeist who competed in the late 1960s. He was eliminated in the semifinals of the K-4 1000 m event at the 1968 Summer Olympics in Mexico City.
