= Alexander Slatnow =

Medal record

Men's canoe sprint

World Championships
Gold medal – first place	1971 Belgrade	K-2 1000 m
Gold medal – first place	1975 Belgrade	K-2 1000 m

Alexander Slatnow (September 29, 1950 – May 21, 2003) was an East German sprint canoeist who competed in the early to mid-1970s. He won two gold medals in the K-2 1000 m event at the ICF Canoe Sprint World Championships, earning them in 1971 and 1975.

Slatnow also finished fourth in the K-2 1000 m event at the 1972 Summer Olympics in Munich.
