= Hans Knudsen (canoeist) =

Danish canoeist (1944–2020)

Hans-Wiggo Knudsen
Personal information
- Nationality: Danish
- Born: 11 August 1944; Herlufsholm, Denmark
- Died: 19 March 2020 (aged 75); Roskilde, Denmark

Sport
- Sport: Canoe racing

Hans-Wiggo Knudsen (sometimes listed as Hans-Viggo Knudsen, August 11, 1944 – March 19, 2020) was a Danish sprint canoer who competed in the mid to late 1960s. Competing in two Summer Olympics, he earned his best finish of ninth twice (1964: K-2 1000 m, 1968: K-4 1000 m).

He was diagnosed with pulmonary fibrosis in 2018, then he died two years later from complications due to COVID-19.
