= Erich Suhrbier =

Medal record

Men's canoe sprint

World Championships
Bronze medal – third place	1963 Jajce	K-2 10000 m

Erich Suhrbier (born 25 April 1938) is a West German sprint canoer who competed in the mid to late 1960s. He won a bronze medal in the K-2 10000 m event at the 1963 ICF Canoe Sprint World Championships in Jajce.

Suhrbier also competed in two Summer Olympics, earning his best finish of fourth in the K-1 1000 m event at Tokyo in 1964.
