= Ninel Vakula =

Soviet canoeist

Medal record

Women's canoe sprint

World Championships
Gold medal – first place	1970 Copenhagen	K-4 500 m

European Championships
Gold medal – first place	1969 Moscow	K-4 500 m

Ninel (Nelli) Vakula (Belarusian: Нінэль Вакула; born 10 September 1949) is a Soviet sprint canoer who competed in the late 1960s and the early 1970s. She was born in Gomel. She won a gold medal in the K-4 500 m event at the 1970 ICF Canoe Sprint World Championships in Copenhagen.
