= Tomio Sumimoto =

Japanese canoeist

Tomio Sumimoto (隅本 富夫, Sumimoto Tomio; born August 20, 1945) is a Japanese sprint canoer who competed in the mid-1960s. He was eliminated in the repechages of the K-4 1000 m event at the 1964 Summer Olympics in Tokyo.
