= Paul de Lavallaz =

Swiss footballer (1901–1995)

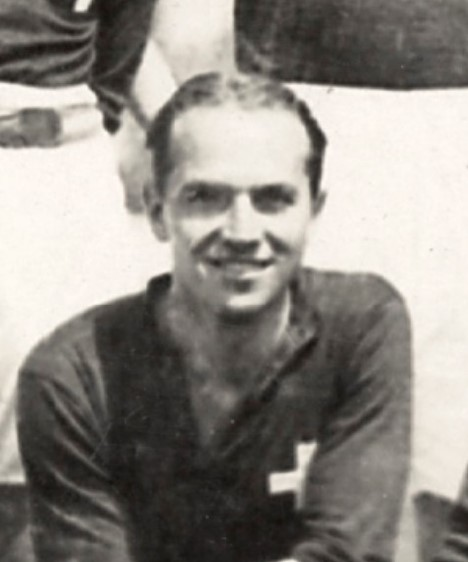
- Paul de Lavallaz in 1928

Personal information
- Date of birth: 28 February 1901
- Date of death: 26 December 1994 (aged 93)

International career
Years	Team	Apps	(Gls)
- Switzerland

Paul de Lavallaz (28 February 1901 – 26 December 1994) was a Swiss footballer. He competed in the men's tournament at the 1928 Summer Olympics. He also played on the Grasshopper Club and Zürich around that same era. His position on the football pitch was the Right-back position.
