= Władysław Szuszkiewicz =

Polish canoeist (1938–2007)

Olympic medal record

Men's canoe sprint
Bronze medal – third place	1972 Munich	K-2 1000 m

Władysław Szuszkiewicz (12 November 1938 in Wilno – 14 November 2007) was a Polish sprint canoer who competed from the mid-1960s to the early 1970s. Competing in three Summer Olympics, he won a bronze medal in the K-2 1000 m event at Munich in 1972.

Szuszkiewicz's wife, the former Izabella Antonowicz, also competed as a sprint canoer during the 1960s and 1970s.
