= Didier Niquet =

French canoeist (born 1949)

Didier Niquet (born 22 July 1949) is a French sprint canoer who competed in the early 1970s. He finished sixth in the K-2 1000 m event at the 1972 Summer Olympics in Munich.
