= Uwe Will =

Medal record

Men's canoe sprint

World Championships
Silver medal – second place	1970 Copenhagen	K-4 1000 m

Klaus-Uwe Will (born 25 June 1939) was an East German sprint canoer who competed in the late 1960s and early 1970s. He won a silver medal in the K-4 1000 m event at the 1970 ICF Canoe Sprint World Championships in Copenhagen.

Will also finished sixth in the K-4 1000 m event at the 1968 Summer Olympics in Mexico City.
