= Preben Jensen (canoeist) =

Danish canoeist (born 1944)

Preben Jensen (born 31 July 1944) is a Danish sprint canoeist who competed in the mid-1960s. At the 1964 Summer Olympics in Tokyo, he finished ninth in the K-2 1000 m event.
