= Walter Richards (canoeist) =

American canoeist (born 1942)

Walter Richards (born March 14, 1942) is an American sprint canoer who competed in the mid-1960s. He was eliminated in the repechages of the K-4 1000 m event at the 1964 Summer Olympics in Tokyo.
