= Dmitry Matveyev (canoeist) =

Soviet sprint canoeist (born 1944)

Medal record

Men's canoe sprint

World Championships
Gold medal – first place	1966 East Berlin	K-1 4 x 500 m

Dmitry Pavlovich Matveyev (Russian: Дми́трий Па́влович Матве́ев; born May 2, 1944) is a Soviet sprint canoeist who competed in the late 1960s. He won a gold medal in the K-1 4 x 500 m event at the 1966 ICF Canoe Sprint World Championships in East Berlin.

Matveyev also competed at the 1968 Summer Olympics in Mexico City in the K-4 1000 m event, but was eliminated in the semifinals.
