= Peter Weekes =

Australian rules footballer

Personal information
- Born: 21 February 1947
- Died: 26 December 1994 (aged 47)
- Original team: Mentone
- Height: 192 cm (6 ft 4 in)
- Weight: 89 kg (196 lb)

Playing career^{1}
| Years | Club | Games (Goals) |
| 1968–71 | Melbourne | 23 (9) |
- ^{1} Playing statistics correct to the end of 1971.

Peter Weekes (21 February 1947 – 26 December 1994) was an Australian rules footballer who played with Melbourne in the Victorian Football League (VFL).
