= William Jewell (footballer) =

English footballer

Personal information
- Date of birth: 1884
- Position: Winger

Senior career*
Years	Team	Apps	(Gls)
1906–1907	Royal Engineers		
1907–1908	Grimsby Town	19	(2)
- * Club domestic league appearances and goals

William Jewell (1884 – after 1907) was an English professional footballer who played as a winger.
