= Woodrow A. Abbott =

United States Air Force general

Brigadier General Woodrow A. Abbott
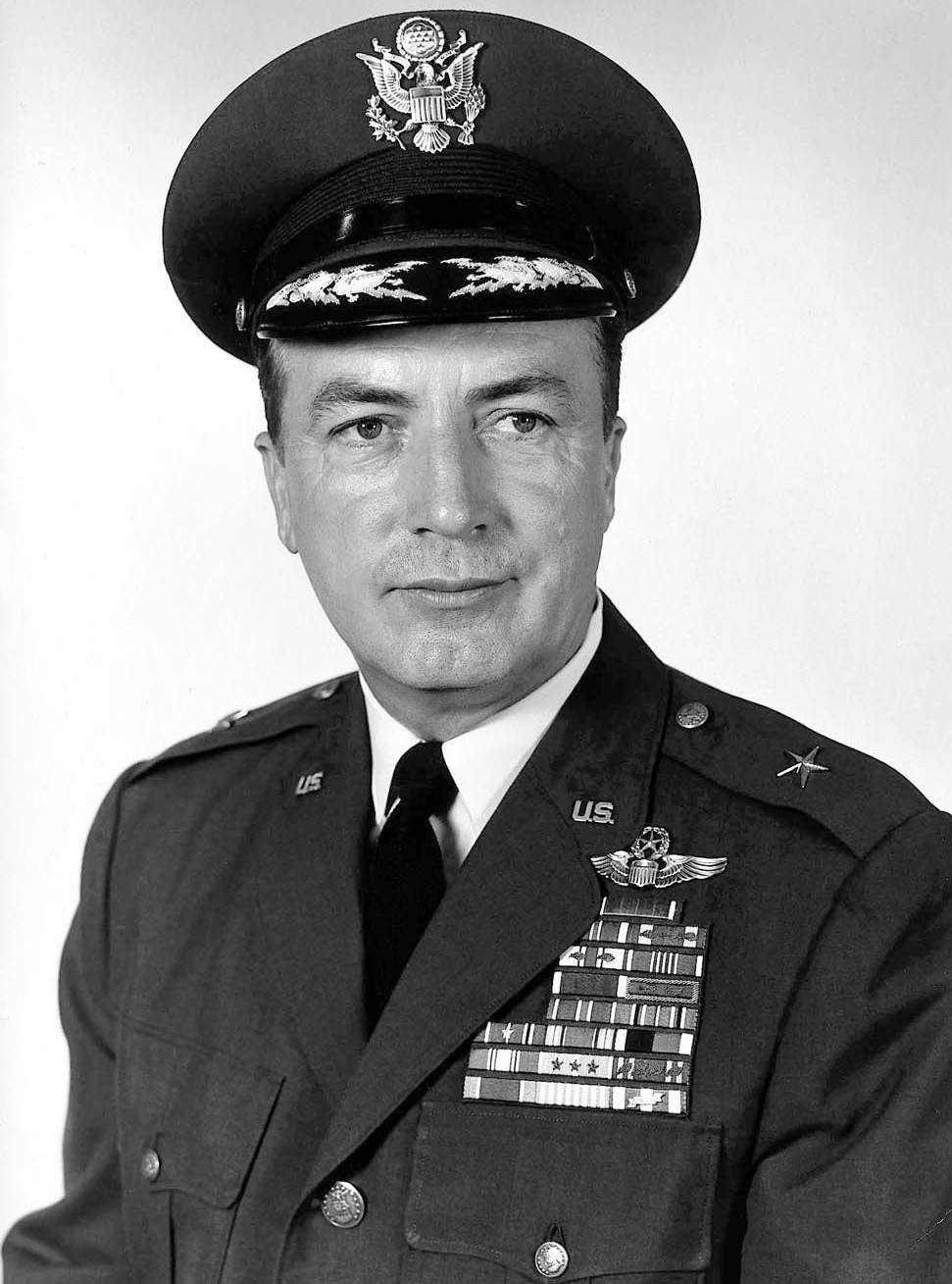
- Brigadier General Woodrow A. Abbott
- Born: 1919; Eubank, Kentucky
- Died: December 29, 1994 (aged 74–75)
- Military career
- Allegiance: United States of America
- Service: United States Air Force
- Service years: retired June 1, 1974
- Rank: Brigadier General
- Website: www.af.mil/About-Us/Biographies/Display/Article/107874/woodrow-a-abbott/

Brigadier General Woodrow A. Abbott (1919 − December 29, 1994) was a United States Air Force officer who served as director of intelligence, J-2, and inspector general of the U.S. Readiness Command, which was then headquartered at MacDill Air Force Base.

Abbott began his college education at Butler University in Indianapolis, Indiana, and completed his bachelor's degree in industrial management at the University of Maryland.
