= Jens Sørensen (canoeist) =

Danish sprint canoer (born 1949)

Jens Christian Sørensen (born 20 August 1949 in Aarhus) is a Danish former sprint canoeist who competed in the early 1970s. He was eliminated in the semifinals of the K-2 1000 m event at the 1972 Summer Olympics in Munich.
