= Paulus Bunschoten =

Dutch canoeist (1933–1994)

Paulus "Paul" Bunschoten (10 October 1933, Koog aan de Zaan - 27 December 1994, Wormerveer) was a Dutch sprint canoer who competed in the late 1960s. He was eliminated in the semifinals of the K-4 1000 m event at the 1968 Summer Olympics in Mexico City.
