= Gordon Jeffery =

Australian canoeist

Gordon Jeffery (born 20 May 1936) is an Australian sprint canoeist who competed from the mid-1960s to the early 1970s. Competing in three Summer Olympics, he earned his best finish of eighth in the K-2 1000 m event at Tokyo in 1964.
