= Herberts Kušķis =

Latvian ice hockey player

- Born: March 5, 1913 Riga, Governorate of Livonia, Russian Empire
- Died: December 29, 1994 (aged 81) Toronto, Ontario, Canada
- Position: Goaltender
- Played for: Unions Rīga; HK ASK Rīga
- National team: Latvia
- Playing career: 1931–1940

Herberts Kušķis (5 March 1913 – 29 December 1994) was a Latvian ice hockey goaltender. He played for Unions Rīga and HK ASK Rīga during his career. He won the Latvian league championship six times, twice with Unions (1932 and 1933) and four with ASK (1935, 1936, 1938, 1939). Kušķis also played for the Latvian national team at the 1936 Winter Olympics and four World Championships.
