= Jörgen Andersen =

Danish canoeist

Medal record

Men's canoe sprint

World Championships
Bronze medal – third place	1973 Tampere	K-1 10000 m

Jörgen Wrønding Andersen (sometimes listed as Jørgen Andersen, born November 5, 1941) is a Danish sprint canoeist who competed from the 1960s to the early 1970s. He won a bronze medal in the K-1 10000 m event at the 1973 ICF Canoe Sprint World Championships in Tampere.

Andersen also competed in two Summer Olympics, earning his best finish of ninth in the K-4 1000 m event at Mexico City in 1968.
