= Staniša Radmanović =

Yugoslav canoeist

Staniša Radmanović (8 October 1940 – 20 January 2010) was a Yugoslav sprint canoeist who competed in the 1960s. Competing in three Summer Olympics, he earned his best finish of eighth in the K-4 1000 m event at Tokyo in 1964.
