= Per Larsson =

Swedish canoeist

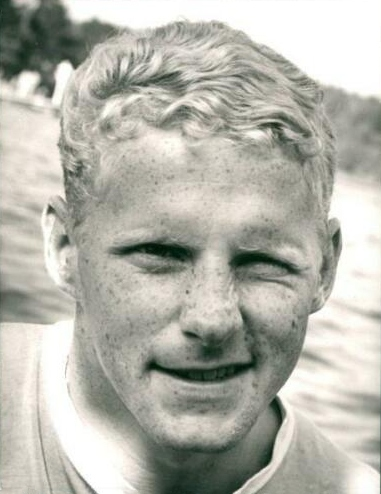
- Larsson in 1968

Personal information
- Born: 30 January 1946 (age 79); Jönköping, Sweden
- Height: 183 cm (6 ft 0 in)
- Weight: 76 kg (168 lb)

Sport
- Sport: Canoe racing
- Club: Jönköpings KK

Per Gunnar Larsson (born 30 January 1946) is a retired Swedish sprint canoer. He was part of four-men teams that finished fourth and eighth in the K-4 1000 m event at the 1968 and 1972 Olympics, respectively.
