= Kurt Lindlgruber =

Austrian canoeist

Medal record

Men's canoe sprint

World Championships
Silver medal – second place	1966 East Berlin	K-4 1000 m

Kurt Lindlgruber (Steyr, 1 November 1934 – 20 October 2013) was an Austrian sprint canoeist who competed from the mid to late 1960s. He won a silver medal in the K-4 1000 m event at the 1966 ICF Canoe Sprint World Championships in East Berlin. Lindlgruber also competed in two Summer Olympics, earning his best finish of seventh in the K-4 1000 m event at Mexico City in 1968.
