= Robert Lowery (canoeist) =

British sprint canoer (born 1937)

Robert Lowery (22 May 1937 – 12 November 2024) was a British canoe sprinter who competed in the early to mid-1960s. Competing two Summer Olympics, he was eliminated in the semifinals of both events at both games (1960: K-1 4 × 500 m, 1964: K-4 1000 m).
