= Per Blom (canoeist) =

Norwegian sprint canoer (born 1949)

Per Conrad Søren Blom (born 27 June 1949) is a Norwegian retired sprint canoer who competed in the early 1970s. At the 1972 Summer Olympics in Munich, he was disqualified in the heats of the K-2 1000 m event.

== Sources ==
- Sports-reference.com profile
