= Yuji Umezawa =

Japanese canoeist (born 1945)

Yuji Umezawa (梅沢 勇治, Umezawa Yūji; born October 16, 1945) is a Japanese sprint canoer who competed in the mid-1960s. He was eliminated in the repechages of the K-4 1000 m event at the 1964 Summer Olympics in Tokyo.
