= Aleksandar Kerčov =

Yugoslav sprint canoer

Aleksandar Kerčov (born 29 November 1940 in Belgrade) is a Yugoslav sprint canoer who competed in the early to mid-1960s. Competing in two Summer Olympics, he earned his best finish of eighth in the K-4 1000 m at Tokyo in 1964.
