= Adrian Powell =

Australian canoeist

Personal information
- Full name: Adrian Francis Powell
- Nationality: Australian
- Born: 6 April 1941 (age 85)
- Height: 5 ft 7 in (170 cm)
- Weight: 139 lb (63 kg)

Sport
- Sport: Canoeing

Adrian Francis Powell (born 6 April 1941) is an Australian sprint canoeist who competed from the early 1960s to the mid-1970s. Competing in five Summer Olympics, he earned his best finish of eighth in the K-2 1000 m event at Tokyo in 1964.

He is the brother of Australian footballer John Powell.
