= Bernd Guse =

German canoeist

Bernd Guse (born 23 February 1941) is a West German sprint canoeist who competed in the late 1960s and early 1970s. He was eliminated in the semifinals of the K-4 1000 m event at the 1968 Summer Olympics in Mexico City. Four years later in Munich, he was eliminated in the repechages of the K-1 1000 m event.
