= William Smoke =

American canoeist

William Smoke (born January 2, 1938) is an American sprint canoeist who competed in the mid-1960s. At the 1964 Summer Olympics in Tokyo, he competed in the K-4 1000 m event, but was eliminated in the 2nd repecharge.

A native of Detroit, Michigan, Smoke was the former husband of Marcia Jones, bronze medalist in the K-1 500 m event at those same games. Their son, Jeff, competed in the K-2 1000 m event at the 2004 Summer Olympics in Athens, but was eliminated in the semifinal.
