= Arpad Simonyik =

Canadian canoeist (born 1940)

Arpad Simonyik (born February 23, 1940, in Bečej) is a Canadian sprint canoer who competed in the mid to late 1960s. He was eliminated in the semifinals of the K-1 1000 m event at the 1964 Summer Olympics in Tokyo. Four years later in Mexico City, Simonyik was eliminated in the heats of the K-2 1000 m event and the semifinals of the K-4 1000 m event.
