= Barry Stuart =

Australian canoeist (1934–2020)

Barry Stuart (4 April 1934 – 27 August 2020) was an Australian sprint canoeist who competed from the late 1950s to the late 1960s. Competing in four Summer Olympics, he earned his best finish of ninth twice (1956: K-1 1000 m, 1964: K-4 1000 m).
