= Paolo Malacarne =

Italian canoeist (born 1947)

Paolo Malacarne (born 4 January 1947) is an Italian sprint canoer who competed in the early 1970s. He was eliminated in the semifinals of K-2 1000 m event at the 1972 Summer Olympics in Munich.
