= Klaus-Peter Ebeling =

East German sprint canoeist

Medal record

Men's canoe sprint

World Championships
Silver medal – second place	1970 Copenhagen	K-4 1000 m
Bronze medal – third place	1970 Copenhagen	K-2 1000 m

Klaus-Peter Ebeling (born 4 August 1944) is an East German sprint canoeist who competed in the late 1960s and early 1970s. Competing He won two medals at the 1970 ICF Canoe Sprint World Championships with a silver in the K-4 1000 m and a bronze in the K-2 1000 m events.

Ebeling also finished sixth in the K-4 1000 m event at the 1968 Summer Olympics in Mexico City.
