= Alan Edwards (canoeist) =

British Olympic sprint canoer

Alan Edwards (21 October 1943 – July 2002) was a British canoe sprinter who competed in the late 1960s. He was eliminated in the semifinals of the K-4 1000 m event at the 1968 Summer Olympics in Mexico City.

During his time at Worcester Canoe Club, he built the current club building in his free time.

He died in July 2002 after battling bowel cancer.
