= Jean-Pierre Cordebois =

French sprint canoer

Jean-Pierre Cordebois (born September 28, 1944) is a French sprint canoer who competed in the late 1960s and late 1970s. Competing in two Summer Olympics, he earned his best finish of sixth in the K-2 1000 m event at Munich in 1972.
