= Hans-Jürgen Riemenschneider =

West German sprint canoer (born 1949)

Hans-Jürgen Riemenschneider (born May 4, 1949 in Bad Nauheim) is a West German sprint canoer who competed in the early 1970s. He finished eighth in the K-2 1000 m event at the 1972 Summer Olympics in Munich.
