= István Csizmadia =

Hungarian canoe racer (born 1944)

Medal record

Men's canoe sprint

Olympic Games
Bronze medal – third place	1968 Mexico City	K-4 1000 m

World Championships
Silver medal – second place	1973 Tampere	K-1 4 x 500 m
Bronze medal – third place	1970 Copenhagen	K-1 4 x 500 m

István Csizmadia (born December 16, 1944) was a Hungarian sprint canoer who competed from the late 1960s to the mid-1970s. He won a bronze medal in the K-4 1000 m event at the 1968 Summer Olympics in Mexico City.

Csizmadia also won two medals in the K-1 4 x 500 m event at the ICF Canoe Sprint World Championships with a silver in 1973 and a bronze in 1970.
