= Terje Wesche =

Norwegian canoeist

Terje Wesche (born May 15, 1947) is a Norwegian sprint canoer who competed in the early 1970s. At the 1972 Summer Olympics in Munich, he was disqualified in the heats of the K-2 1000 m event due to management fault. He won several gold medals i international competitions and in the Norwegian and Nordic Championships.
