= Åke Sandin =

Swedish sprint canoer (born 1944)

Medal record

Men's canoe sprint

World Championships
Bronze medal – third place	1970 Copenhagen	K-4 10000 m

Thor Fritz Åke Sandin (born February 23, 1944) is a Swedish sprint canoer who competed in the late 1960s and early 1970s. He won a bronze medal in the K-4 10000 m event at the 1970 ICF Canoe Sprint World Championships in Copenhagen.

Sandin also finished fourth in the K-4 1000 m event at the 1968 Summer Olympics in Mexico City.
