= Kurt Heubusch =

Kurt Heubusch (August 4, 1941 – Linz, March 12, 2006) was an Austrian sprint canoer who competed from the mid-1960s to the early 1970s. At the 1964 Summer Olympics in Tokyo, he was eliminated in the semifinals of the K-4 1000 m event. Eight years later in Munich, Heubusch was eliminated again in the K-4 1000 m event only this time it was in the repechages.
