= Ion Jacob =

Romanian canoeist

Medal record

Men's canoe sprint

World Championships
Silver medal – second place	1970 Copenhagen	K-1 4 x 500 m

Ion Jacob is a Romanian sprint canoer who competed in the early 1970s. He won a silver medal in the K-1 4 x 500 m event at the 1970 ICF Canoe Sprint World Championships in Copenhagen.
