= Stanisław Jankowiak =

Polish canoeist (1941–1999)

Stanisław Jankowiak (born 8 May 1941 in Zasutowo near Poznań – 11 May 1999 in Poznań) was a Polish sprint canoer who competed in the mid-1960s. He was eliminated in the semifinals of the K-4 1000 m at the 1964 Summer Olympics in Tokyo.
