= Hans Nilsson (canoeist) =

Swedish canoeist

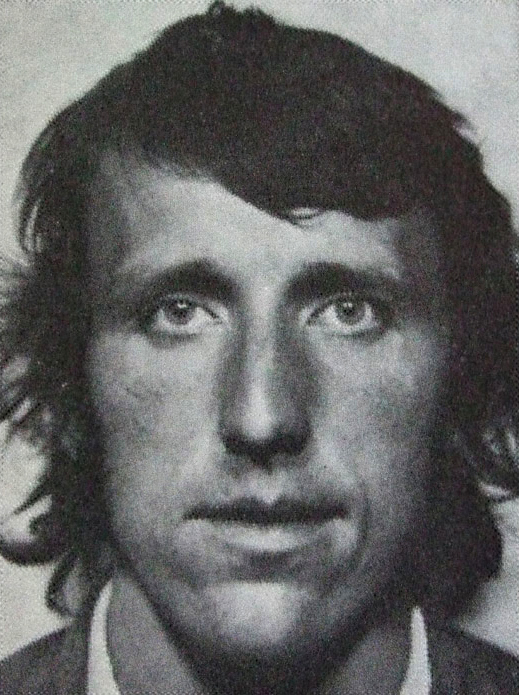

Personal information
- Born: 5 September 1946 (age 79) Nyköping, Sweden
- Height: 192 cm (6 ft 4 in)
- Weight: 85 kg (187 lb)

Sport
- Sport: Canoe racing
- Club: Nyköping Kanotklubb
Medal record
Representing Sweden
World Championships
Bronze medal – third place	1970 Copenhagen	K-4 10000 m

Hans Evert Nilsson (born 5 September 1946) is a Swedish sprint canoer who competed in the late 1960s and early 1970s. He won a bronze medal in the K-4 10000 m event at the 1970 ICF Canoe Sprint World Championships in Copenhagen.

Nilsson also competed in two Summer Olympics, earning his best finish of fourth in the K-4 1000 m event in 1968.
