= William Jewell (canoeist) =

American canoeist

Personal information
- Born: July 14, 1941 (age 85)

Sport
- Country: United States
- Sport: Canoeing

William Jewell (born July 14, 1941) is an American sprint canoer who competed in the mid-1960s. He was eliminated in the repechages of the K-4 1000 m event at the 1964 Summer Olympics in Tokyo.
