= Fritz Nikolai =

Austrian footballer (1925–1994)

Personal information
- Full name: Friedrich Nikolai
- Date of birth: 1 September 1925
- Place of birth: Vienna, Austria
- Date of death: 12 December 1994 (aged 69)
- Place of death: Wiener Neustadt, Austria
- Position: Goalkeeper

International career
Years	Team	Apps	(Gls)
- Austria

Fritz Nikolai (1 September 1925 – 12 December 1994) was an Austrian footballer. He competed in the men's tournament at the 1952 Summer Olympics. Nikolai died in Wiener Neustadt on 12 December 1994, at the age of 69.
