= Michael Brown (canoeist) =

Canadian sprint canoer (1937–2024)

Michael Brown (August 21, 1937 – May 1, 2024) was a Canadian sprint canoer who competed in the early to mid-1960s. At the 1960 Summer Olympics in Rome, he was eliminated in the repechage round of the K-1 1000 m event. Four years later, at the 1964 Summer Olympics in Tokyo, Brown was eliminated in the semifinals of the K-2 1000 m. Brown died on May 1, 2024, at the age of 86.

== Sources ==
- Michael Brown's profile at Sports Reference.com
- Michael Brown at Olympedia
