= Angelo Pedroni (canoeist) =

Italian canoeist

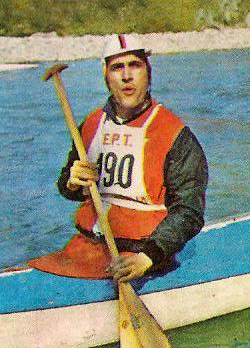

Personal information
- Born: 6 October 1943 (age 83) Cremona, Italy
- Height: 1.75 m (5 ft 9 in)
- Weight: 71 kg (157 lb)

Sport
- Sport: Slalom canoeing
- Club: Società Canottieri Baldesio, Cremona

Angelo Pedroni (born 6 October 1943) is an Italian canoe sprinter who competed in the mid-1960s. He finished sixth in the K-4 1000 m event at the 1964 Summer Olympics in Tokyo.
