= Alistair Wilson =

British sprint canoeist (1939–2023)

Alistair Wilson (20 August 1939 – 19 November 2023) was a British sprint canoeist who competed in the mid-1960s. He competed in two Summer Olympics, 1964 and 1968. He earned his best finish of eighth in the K-1 1000 m event at Tokyo in 1964. Wilson died on 19 November 2023, at the age of 84.

== Sources ==
- Sports-reference.com profile
