= Cesare Zilioli =

Italian canoeist

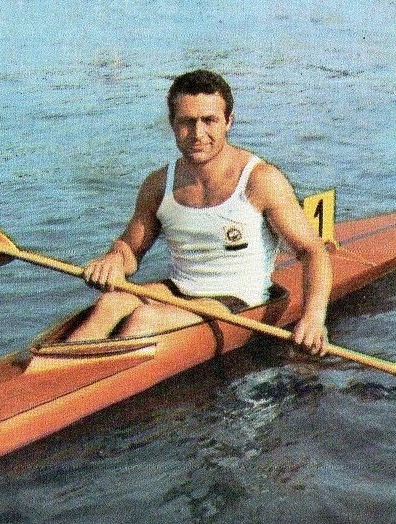

Personal information
- Born: 21 April 1938 (age 88) Stagno Lombardo, Cremona, Italy
- Height: 1.73 m (5 ft 8 in)
- Weight: 79 kg (174 lb)

Sport
- Sport: Slalom canoeing
- Club: Società Canottieri Baldesio, Cremona

Cesare Zilioli (born 21 April 1938) is an Italian canoe sprinter. He competed at the 1960, 1964 and 1968 Olympics with the best results of sixth place in 1964, in the K-2 1000 m and K-4 1000 m events.
