= Gose (surname) =

Gose is a surname. Notable people with the surname include:

- Anthony Gose (born 1990), American baseball player
- Isabel Marie Gose (born 2002), German swimmer
- Stephen M. Gose, American oilman and polo player

== See also ==
- Gore (surname)
