= Jan Wittenberg =

Dutch sprint canoer (born 1943)

- Born: February 26, 1943 (age 83)
- Occupation: sprint canoer

Jan Wittenberg (born 26 February 1943, Deventer) is a Dutch sprint canoer who competed in the mid to late 1960s. Competing in two Summer Olympics, he earned his best finish of seventh in the K-4 1000 m at Tokyo in 1964.
