= Gunnar Utterberg =

Swedish canoe sprinter (1942–2021)

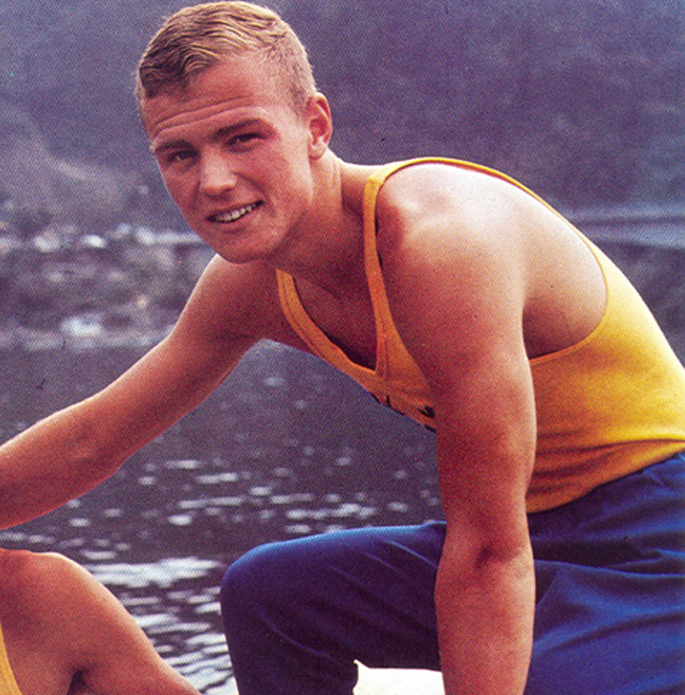
- Gunnar Utterberg competing at the 1964 Summer Olympics in Tokyo.

Personal information
- Nationality: Swedish
- Born: 28 November 1942 Jönköping, Sweden
- Died: 12 September 2021 (aged 78)
- Height: 1.82 m (6 ft 0 in)
- Weight: 69 kg (152 lb)

Sport
- Country: Sweden
- Sport: Canoe sprint
- Club: Nyköpings Kanotklubb
Medal record
Representing Sweden
Olympic Games
Gold medal – first place	1964 Tokyo	K-2 1000 m
Canoe Sprint European Championships
Silver medal – second place	1967 Duisburg	K-2 1000 m
Silver medal – second place	1967 Duisburg	K-2 10000 m
Silver medal – second place	1969 Moscow	K-2 10000 m

Gunnar Utterberg (28 November 1942 – 12 September 2021) was a Swedish canoe sprinter from Jönköping. He competed in 1000 m doubles and fours at the 1964, 1968 and 1972 Olympics and won a gold medal in the doubles event in 1964. He also won three silver medals at the European championships in 1967 and 1969. He died in September 2021, at the age of 78.
