= Rafał Piszcz =

Polish canoeist (1940–2012)

Olympic medal record

Men's canoe sprint
Bronze medal – third place	1972 Munich	K-2 1000 m

Rafał Maciej Piszcz (24 October 1940 – 12 September 2012) was a Polish sprint canoer who competed from the mid-1960s to the early 1970s. Competing in three Summer Olympics, he won a bronze medal in the K-2 1000 m event at Munich in 1972. He was born and died in Poznań.
