= Toon Geurts =

Dutch sprint canoer

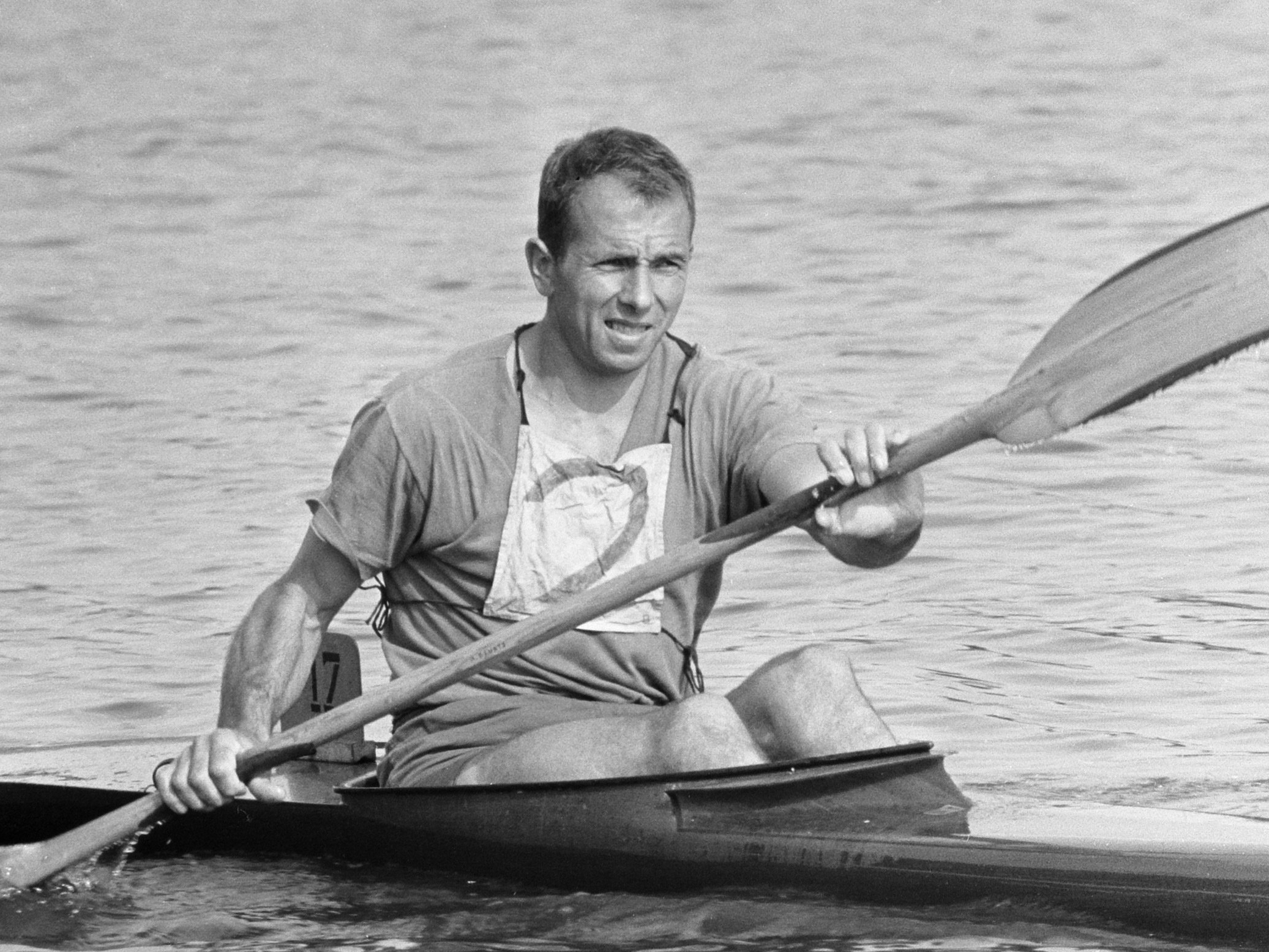
- Anton Geurts in 1968

Personal information
- Born: 29 February 1932 Veldhoven, Netherlands
- Died: 5 October 2017 (aged 85)
- Height: 1.82 m (6 ft 0 in)
- Weight: 83 kg (183 lb)

Sport
- Sport: Canoe sprint
- Club: Beatrix, Eindhoven
Medal record
Representing the Netherlands
Olympic Games
Silver medal – second place	1964 Tokyo	K-2 1000 m

Antonius "Toon" Geurts (29 February 1932 – 5 October 2017) was a Dutch canoe sprinter. He was most successful in the K-2 1000 m event, in which he finished in seventh, second and fourth place at the 1960, 1964 and 1968 Olympics, respectively.
