= Canoeing at the 1980 Summer Olympics – Women's K-2 500 metres =

The women's K-2 500 metres event was a pairs kayaking event conducted as part of the Canoeing at the 1980 Summer Olympics program.

== Medalists ==
Gold	Silver	Bronze
Carsta Genäuß and Martina Bischof (GDR)	Galina Alexeyeva and Nina Trofimova (URS)	Éva Rakusz and Mária Zakariás (HUN)

== Results ==
=== Heats ===
Thirteen crews entered in two heats on July 30, but one withdrew. The top three finishers from each of the heats advanced directly to the final while the remaining six teams were relegated to the semifinal.

Heat 1
1.	Galina Kreft and Nina Gopova (URS)	1:47.07	QF
2.	Elisabeta Bǎbeanu and Agafia Buhaev (ROU)	1:48.04	QF
3.	Anne-Marie Loriot and Valérie Leclerc (FRA)	1:48.52	QF
4.	Agneta Andersson and Karin Olsson (SWE)	1:49.96	QS
5.	Mariya Mincheva and Natasha Petrova (BUL)	1:50.51	QS
6.	Luisa Ponchio and Elisabetta Introini (ITA)	1:58.35	QS
-	Marleen Kuppens and Brigitte Vernaillen (BEL)	Did not start
Heat 2
1.	Carsta Genäuß and Martina Bischof (GDR)	1:46.95	QF
2.	Éva Rakusz and Mária Zakariás (HUN)	1:49.92	QF
3.	Ewa Eichler and Ewa Wojtaszek (POL)	1:52.14	QF
4.	Ineke Bakker and Marijke Kegge (NED)	1:52.31	QS
5.	Frances Wetherall and Lesley Smither (GBR)	1:53.25	QS
6.	Jana Polakovičová and Helena Vašáková (TCH)	1:59.83	QS

In the official report, Mincheya's first name was listed as Velichka.

=== Semifinal ===
The top three finishers in the semifinal (raced on August 1) advanced to the final.

Semifinal
1.	Mariya Mincheva and Natasha Petrova (BUL)	1:51.66	QF
2.	Agneta Andersson and Karin Olsson (SWE)	1:52.77	QF
3.	Frances Wetherall and Lesley Smither (GBR)	1:53.12	QF
4.	Ineke Bakker and Marijke Kegge (NED)	1:54.36
5.	Luisa Ponchio and Elisabetta Introini (ITA)	1:55.29
6.	Jana Polakovičová and Helena Vašáková (TCH)	1:57.34

=== Final ===
The final was held on August 1.

Gold	Carsta Genäuß and Martina Bischof (GDR)	1:43.88
Silver	Galina Kreft and Nina Gopova (URS)	1:46.91
Bronze	Éva Rakusz and Mária Zakariás (HUN)	1:47.95
4.	Elisabeta Bǎbeanu and Agafia Buhaev (ROU)	1:48.04
5.	Agneta Andersson and Karin Olsson (SWE)	1:49.27
6.	Anne-Marie Loriot and Valérie Leclerc (FRA)	1:49.48
7.	Ewa Eichler and Ewa Wojtaszek (POL)	1:51.31
8.	Frances Wetherall and Lesley Smither (GBR)	1:52.76
9.	Mariya Mincheva and Natasha Petrova (BUL)	1:53.12

The East Germans achieved the most decisive victory in women's Olympic canoeing ever.
