= Canoeing at the 1976 Summer Olympics – Women's K-2 500 metres =

The women's K-2 500 metres event was a pairs kayaking event conducted as part of the Canoeing at the 1976 Summer Olympics program.

== Medalists ==
Gold	Silver	Bronze
Nina Gopova and Galina Kreft (URS)	Anna Pfeffer and Klára Rajnai (HUN)	Bärbel Köster and Carola Zirzow (GDR)

== Results ==
=== Heats ===
The 14 crews first raced in two heats on July 28. The top three finishers from each of the heats advanced directly to the semifinals while the remaining eight teams were relegated to the repechages.

Heat 1
1.	Nina Gopova and Galina Kreft (URS)	1:54.49	QS
2.	Nastasia Nichitov and Agafia Orlov (ROU)	1:59.33	QS
3.	Maria Kazanecka and Katarzyna Kulczak (POL)	2:01.45	QS
4.	Susan Holloway and Anne Dodge (CAN)	2:03.50	QR
5.	Sylvaine Deltour and Anne-Marie Loriot (FRA)	2:06.12	QR
6.	Catherine Burelle and Marleen Kuppens (BEL)	2:10.48	QR
7.	Helen Jacobsohn and Sue Whitebrook (AUS)	2:10.62	QR
Heat 2
1.	Bärbel Köster and Carola Zirzow (GDR)	1:52.67	QS
2.	Anna Pfeffer and Klára Rajnai (HUN)	1:54.25	QS
3.	Barbara Lewe-Pohlmann and Heiderose Wallbaum (FRG)	1:55.59	QS
4.	Linda Dragan and Ann Turner (USA)	1:59.32	QR
5.	Anastázie Hajná and Jindřiška Řeháčková (TCH)	1:59.45	QR
6.	Pauline Goodwin and Hilary Peacock (GBR)	2:00.34	QR
7.	Mariya Mincheva and Natasha Petrova (BUL)	2:00.52	QR

=== Repechages ===
The eight crews first raced in two repechages on July 28. The top three finishers from each of the repechages advanced directly to the semifinals.

Repechage 1
1.	Susan Holloway and Anne Dodge (CAN)	1:55.63	QS
2.	Mariya Mincheva and Natasha Petrova (BUL)	1:56.60	QS
3.	Anastázie Hajná and Jindřiška Řeháčková (TCH)	1:58.97	QS
4.	Catherine Burelle and Marleen Kuppens (BEL)	2:00.44
Repechage 2
1.	Linda Dragan and Ann Turner (USA)	1:59.15	QS
2.	Sylvaine Deltour and Anne-Marie Loriot (FRA)	2:00.70	QS
3.	Pauline Goodwin and Hilary Peacock (GBR)	2:01.68	QS
4.	Helen Jacobsohn and Sue Whitebrook (AUS)	2:03.87

=== Semifinals ===
The top three finishers in each of the semifinals (raced on July 30) advanced to the final.

Semifinal 1
1.	Nina Gopova and Galina Kreft (URS)	1:54.70	QF
2.	Barbara Lewe-Pohlmann and Heiderose Wallbaum (FRG)	1:55.31	QF
3.	Anastázie Hajná and Jindřiška Řeháčková (TCH)	1:56.45	QF
4.	Linda Dragan and Ann Turner (USA)	1:57.10
Semifinal 2
1.	Bärbel Köster and Carola Zirzow (GDR)	1:50.56	QF
2.	Mariya Mincheva and Natasha Petrova (BUL)	1:53.29	QF
3.	Maria Kazanecka and Katarzyna Kulczak (POL)	1:53.50	QF
4.	Sylvaine Deltour and Anne-Marie Loriot (FRA)	1:55.75
Semifinal 3
1.	Anna Pfeffer and Klára Rajnai (HUN)	1:52.51	QF
2.	Nastasia Nichitov and Agafia Orlov (ROU)	1:53.38	QF
3.	Susan Holloway and Anne Dodge (CAN)	1:56.83	QF
4.	Pauline Goodwin and Hilary Peacock (GBR)	1:59.53

=== Final ===
The final was held on July 30.

Gold	Nina Gopova and Galina Kreft (URS)	1:51.15
Silver	Anna Pfeffer and Klára Rajnai (HUN)	1:51.69
Bronze	Bärbel Köster and Carola Zirzow (GDR)	1:51.81
4.	Nastasia Nichitov and Agafia Orlov (ROU)	1:53.77
5.	Barbara Lewe-Pohlmann and Heiderose Wallbaum (FRG)	1:53.86
6.	Maria Kazanecka and Katarzyna Kulczak (POL)	1:55.05
7.	Mariya Mincheva and Natasha Petrova (BUL)	1:55.95
8.	Susan Holloway and Anne Dodge (CAN)	1:56.75
9.	Anastázie Hajná and Jindřiška Řeháčková (TCH)	1:59.65
