= Canoeing at the 1980 Summer Olympics – Women's K-1 500 metres =

The women's K-1 500 metres event was an individual kayaking event conducted as part of the Canoeing at the 1980 Summer Olympics program.

== Medalists ==
Gold	Silver	Bronze
Birgit Fischer (GDR)	Vanja Gesheva-Tsvetkova (BUL)	Antonina Melnikova (URS)

== Results ==
=== Heats ===
Thirteen competitors entered in two heats on July 30, but two withdrew. The top three finishers from each of the heats advanced directly to the final while the rest competed in the semifinal.

Heat 1
1.	Birgit Fischer (GDR)	1:56.92	QF
2.	Vanja Gesheva (BUL)	1:58.40	QF
3.	Antonina Melnikova (URS)	1:58.74	QF
4.	Katalin Povázsán (HUN)	2:01.21	QS
5.	Lucy Perret (GBR)	2:03.09	QS
-	Elisabetta Introini (ITA)	Did not start
-	Ineke Bakker (NED)	Did not start
Heat 2
1.	Ewa Eichler (POL)	1:59.75	QF
2.	Maria Ştefan (ROU)	1:59.94	QF
3.	Béatrice Knopf (FRA)	2:00.59	QF
4.	Agneta Andersson (SWE)	2:01.00	QS
5.	Marleen Kuppens (BEL)	2:05.61	QS
6.	Jana Polakovičová (TCH)	2:07.68	QS

=== Semifinal ===
The top three finishers in the semifinal (raced on August 1) advanced to the final.

Semifinal
1.	Katalin Povázsán (HUN)	2:02.66	QF
2.	Lucy Perret (GBR)	2:03.73	QF
3.	Agneta Andersson (SWE)	2:04.39	QF
4.	Marleen Kuppens (BEL)	2:04.86
5.	Jana Polakovičová (TCH)	2:08.99

=== Final ===
The final was held on August 1.

Gold	Birgit Fischer (GDR)	1:57.96
Silver	Vanja Gesheva (BUL)	1:59.48
Bronze	Antonina Melnikova (URS)	1:59.66
4.	Maria Ştefan (ROU)	2:00.90
5.	Ewa Eichler (POL)	2:01.23
6.	Agneta Andersson (SWE)	2:01.33
7.	Katalin Povázsán (HUN)	2:01.52
8.	Béatrice Knopf (FRA)	2:02.91
9.	Lucy Perret (GBR)	2:04.89
