= Sletsjøe =

Sletsjøe is a Norwegian surname. Notable people with the surname include:

- Anna Margrete Sletsjøe (born 1997), Norwegian canoeist
- Arne Sletsjøe (born 1960), Norwegian mathematician and retired sprint canoer
- Arne Sletsjøe (1916–1999), Norwegian violist
