= 2024 ICF Canoe Sprint World Championships – Women's K-1 5000 metres =

Women's K-1 5000 metres at the 2024 ICF Canoe Sprint World Championships
- Venue: Rowing and Canoeing Race Course in Samarkand
- Location: Samarkand, Uzbekistan
- Dates: 25 August
- Competitors: 16 from 16 nations
- Winning time: 25:18.913

Medalists
| gold medal | Emese Kőhalmi | Hungary |
| silver medal | Maryna Litvinchuk | Authorised Neutral Athletes |
| bronze medal | Miriam Vega | Spain |

The women's K-1 5000 metres competition at the 2024 ICF Canoe Sprint World Championships in Samarkand took place in Rowing and Canoeing Race Course in Samarkand.

== Schedule ==
The schedule is as follows:

| Date | Time | Round |
|---|---|---|
| Sunday 25 August 2024 | 17:09 | Final |

== Results ==
As a long-distance event, it was held as a direct final.

| Rank | Canoeist | Country | Time |
|---|---|---|---|
| 1st place, gold medalist(s) | Emese Kőhalmi | Hungary | 25:18.913 |
| 2nd place, silver medalist(s) | Maryna Litvinchuk | Authorised Neutral Athletes | 25:35.267 |
| 3rd place, bronze medalist(s) | Miriam Vega | Spain | 25:58.804 |
| 4 | Anna Margrete Sletsjøe | Norway | 26:01.282 |
| 5 | Doreen Kemp | New Zealand | 26:29.846 |
| 6 | Anežka Paloudová | Czech Republic | 27:15.784 |
| 7 | Ana Šteblaj | Slovenia | 28:11.923 |
| 8 | Pauline Freslon | France | 28:21.020 |
| 9 | Tatyana Tokarnitskaya | Kazakhstan | 28:25.376 |
| 10 | Choi Ran | South Korea | 28:35.614 |
| 11 | Juri Urada | Japan | 28:45.096 |
| | Melina Andersson | Sweden | DNF |
| | Katrine Jensen | Denmark | DNS |
| | Shakhrizoda Mavlonova | Uzbekistan | DNF |
| | Nataliia Dokiienko | Ukraine | DNF |
| | Saman Soltani | ICF | DNS |
