= 2025 ICF Canoe Sprint World Championships – Women's K-1 5000 metres =

Women's K-1 5000 metres at the 2025 ICF Canoe Sprint World Championships
- Venue: Idroscalo Regatta Course
- Location: Milan, Italy
- Dates: 24 August
- Competitors: 26 from 25 nations
- Winning time: 23:10.86

Medalists
gold medal	Melina Andersson	Sweden
silver medal	Susanna Cicali	Italy
bronze medal	Anna Margrete Sletsjøe	Norway

The women's K-1 5000 metres competition at the 2025 ICF Canoe Sprint World Championships in Milan took place at Idroscalo Regatta Course.

== Schedule ==
The schedule is as follows:

Date	Time	Round
Sunday 24 August 2025	15:15	Final

== Results ==
As a long-distance event, it was held as a direct final.

Rank	Name	Country	Time
1st place, gold medalist(s)	Melina Andersson	Sweden	23:10.86
2nd place, silver medalist(s)	Susanna Cicali	Italy	23:54.97
3rd place, bronze medalist(s)	Anna Margrete Sletsjøe	Norway	24:17.48
4	Estefania Fernandez	Spain	24:25.35
5	Zsóka Csikós	Hungary	25:01.89
6	Romana Švecová	Slovakia	25:04.12
7	Barbora Sovová	Czech Republic	25:06.14
8	Doreen Kemp	New Zealand	25:11.39
9	Uladzislava Skryhanava	Individual Neutral Athletes	25:31.43
10	Emma Russell	Great Britain	25:31.72
11	Kali Wilding	United States	25:44.24
12	Mariya Povkh	Ukraine	25:47.34
13	Pauline Freslon	France	25:58.10
14	Enja Roesseling	Germany	26:00.86
15	Magdalena Garro	Argentina	26:17.57
16	Sara Terui	Japan	26:20.87
17	Netta Malinen	Finland	26:28.62
18	Saman Soltani	ICF	26:38.32
19	Kitty Schiphorst Preuper	Netherlands	26:54.53
20	Seon Min-ju	South Korea	27:01.16
21	Stevani Maysche Ibo	Indonesia	28:00.40
22	Samara Antony Chacko	India	Lapped
	Karen Berrelleza	Mexico	DSQ
	Elizaveta Fedorova	Estonia	DNF
	Elena Mironchenko	Individual Neutral Athletes	DNF
	Stella Sukhanova	Kazakhstan	DNF
