= Eva Karlsson =

Swedish sprint canoer (born 1961)

Medal record

Women's canoe sprint

Olympic Games
Silver medal – second place	1984 Los Angeles	K-4 500 m

World Championships
Bronze medal – third place	1981 Nottingham	K-4 500 m

Eva Karlsson (born 21 September 1961) is a Swedish sprint canoer who competed in the 1980s. She won a silver medal in the K-4 500 m event at the 1984 Summer Olympics, together with teammates Susanne Wiberg-Gunnarsson, Anna Olsson and Agneta Andersson.

Karlsson's husband Thomas Ohlsson won a silver medal in the K-4 1000 m event at those same games.

She also won a bronze medal in the K-4 500 m event at the 1981 ICF Canoe Sprint World Championships in Nottingham.
