= 2025 ICF Canoe Sprint World Championships – Women's K-1 1000 metres =

Women's K-1 1000 metres at the 2025 ICF Canoe Sprint World Championships
- Venue: Idroscalo Regatta Course
- Location: Milan, Italy
- Dates: 20–22 August
- Competitors: 25 from 25 nations
- Winning time: 3:50.46

Medalists
gold medal	Zsóka Csikós	Hungary
silver medal	Alyssa Buck	Australia
bronze medal	Aimee Fisher	New Zealand

The women's K-1 1000 metres competition at the 2025 ICF Canoe Sprint World Championships in Milan took place in Idroscalo Regatta Course.

== Schedule ==
The schedule is as follows:

Date	Time	Round
Wednesday 20 August 2025	10:47	Heats
Thursday 21 August 2025	14:28	Semifinals
Friday 22 August 2025	14:15	Final B
Friday 22 August 2025	15:32	Final A

== Results ==
=== Heats ===
The fastest boat in each heat advanced directly to the final (FA). The next six fastest boats in each heat advanced to the semifinal (QS).

==== Heat 1 ====
Rank	Canoeist	Country	Time	Notes
1	Zsóka Csikós	Hungary	4:03.11	FA
2	Iuliia Babashinskaia	Individual Neutral Athletes	4:06.22	QS
3	Laura Pedruelo	Spain	4:09.23	QS
4	Giada Rossetti	Italy	4:10.02	QS
5	Franziska Widmer	Switzerland	4:10.17	QS
6	Enja Rößeling	Germany	4:10.84	QS
7	Elise Austvoll Erland	Norway	4:18.26	QS
8	Bianca Istratescu	Romania	4:18.98	
9	Yan Siou-hua	Chinese Taipei	4:47.02	

==== Heat 2 ====
Rank	Canoeist	Country	Time	Notes
1	Alyssa Buck	Australia	3:56.62	FA
2	Melina Andersson	Sweden	3:58.25	QS
3	Elizaveta Fedorova	Estonia	4:08.07	QS
4	Pauline Freslon	France	4:09.49	QS
5	Kitty Schiphorst Preuper	Netherlands	4:11.20	QS
6	Barbora Sovová	Czech Republic	4:14.73	QS
7	Saman Soltani	ICF	4:16.78	QS
8	Karen Berrelleza	Mexico	4:32.34	

==== Heat 3 ====
Rank	Canoeist	Country	Time	Notes
1	Aimee Fisher	New Zealand	4:02.68	FA
2	Mariya Povkh	Ukraine	4:06.04	QS
3	Stella Sukhanova	Kazakhstan	4:08.12	QS
4	Emma Russell	Great Britain	4:08.97	QS
5	Pernille Knudsen	Denmark	4:12.53	QS
6	Netta Malinen	Finland	4:16.07	QS
7	Kali Wilding	United States	4:18.79	QS
8	Lize Broekx	Belgium	4:33.00	

=== Semifinals ===
The fastest three boats in each semi advanced to the A final. The next four fastest boats in each semi and best 8th advanced to the final B.

==== Semifinal 1 ====
Rank	Canoeist	Country	Time	Notes
1	Laura Pedruelo	Spain	3:59.29	FA
2	Mariya Povkh	Ukraine	4:00.96	FA
3	Emma Russell	Great Britain	4:01.47	FA
4	Elizaveta Fedorova	Estonia	4:03.88	FB
5	Barbora Sovová	Czech Republic	4:07.13	FB
6	Franziska Widmer	Switzerland	4:07.40	FB
7	Kali Wilding	United States	4:10.69	FB
8	Pauline Freslon	France	4:14.14	
9	Enja Rößeling	Germany	4:16.14	

==== Semifinal 2 ====
Rank	Canoeist	Country	Time	Notes
1	Melina Andersson	Sweden	3:59.03	FA
2	Iuliia Babashinskaia	Individual Neutral Athletes	4:00.57	FA
3	Giada Rossetti	Italy	4:02.71	FA
4	Pernille Knudsen	Denmark	4:06.07	FB
5	Kitty Schiphorst Preuper	Netherlands	4:07.44	FB
6	Stella Sukhanova	Kazakhstan	4:10.99	FB
7	Saman Soltani	ICF	4:11.56	FB
8	Netta Malinen	Finland	4:13.18	fB
9	Elise Austvoll Erland	Norway	4:14.23	

=== Finals ===
==== Final B ====
Competitors in this final raced for positions 10 to 18.

Rank	Canoeist	Country	Time	Notes
1	Stella Sukhanova	Kazakhstan	4:06.43	
2	Pernille Knudsen	Denmark	4:06.67	
3	Kitty Schiphorst Preuper	Netherlands	4:07.49	
4	Elizaveta Fedorova	Estonia	4:10.14	
5	Barbora Sovová	Czech Republic	4:10.44	
6	Franziska Widmer	Switzerland	4:12.07	
7	Netta Malinen	Finland	4:14.05	
8	Saman Soltani	ICF	4:17.31	
9	Kali Wilding	United States	4:27.24	

==== Final A ====
Competitors raced for positions 1 to 9, with medals going to the top three.

Rank	Canoeist	Country	Time	Notes
1st place, gold medalist(s)	Zsóka Csikós	Hungary	3:50.46	
2nd place, silver medalist(s)	Alyssa Buck	Australia	3:51.53	
3rd place, bronze medalist(s)	Aimee Fisher	New Zealand	3:54.11	
4	Melina Andersson	Sweden	3:54.61	
5	Iuliia Babashinskaia	Individual Neutral Athletes	3:56.41	
6	Laura Pedruelo	Spain	3:59.17	
7	Mariya Povkh	Ukraine	4:00.64	
8	Emma Russell	Great Britain	4:02.08	
9	Giada Rossetti	Italy	4:02.26	
