= Canoeing at the 1984 Summer Olympics – Women's K-1 500 metres =

The women's K-1 500 metres event was an individual kayaking event conducted as part of the Canoeing at the 1984 Summer Olympics program.

== Medalists ==
Gold	Silver	Bronze
Agneta Andersson (SWE)	Barbara Schüttpelz (FRG)	Annemiek Derckx (NED)

== Results ==
=== Heats ===
Eleven competitors entered in two heats on August 6. The top three finishers from each of the heats advanced directly to the final while the rest competed in the semifinal.

Heat 1
1.	Agneta Andersson (SWE)	2:03.99	QF
2.	Elizabeth Blencowe (AUS)	2:05.51	QF
3.	Tecla Marinescu (ROU)	2:05.72	QF
4.	Sheila Conover (USA)	2:06.89	QS
5.	Lesley Smither (GBR)	2:10.81	QS
6.	Ho Kim Fai (HKG)	2:30.96	QS
Heat 2
1.	Barbara Schüttpelz (FRG)	2:02.14	QF
2.	Béatrice Basson (FRA)	2:03.61	QF
3.	Annemiek Derckx (NED)	2:04.75	QF
4.	Lucie Guay (CAN)	2:06.94	QS
5.	Ingeborg Rasmussen (NOR)	2:09.33	QS

=== Semifinal ===
The top three finishers in the semifinal (raced on August 8) advanced to the final.

Semifinal
1.	Lucie Guay (CAN)	2:03.73	QF
2.	Sheila Conover (USA)	2:03.79	QF
3.	Lesley Smither (GBR)	2:03.80	QF
4.	Ingeborg Rasmussen (NOR)	2:04.46
5.	Ho Kim Fai (HKG)	2:30.40

=== Final ===
The final was held on August 10.

Gold	Agneta Andersson (SWE)	1:58.72
Silver	Barbara Schüttpelz (FRG)	1:59.93
Bronze	Annemiek Derckx (NED)	2:00.11
4.	Tecla Marinescu (ROU)	2:00.12
5.	Béatrice Basson (FRA)	2:01.21
6.	Sheila Conover (USA)	2:02.38
7.	Lucie Guay (CAN)	2:02.49
8.	Elizabeth Blencowe (AUS)	2:02.63
9.	Lesley Smither (GBR)	2:04.09

Andersson earned three medals at the 1984 Summer Olympics with two golds and one silver. She credited her switch to organic foods.
