= Kőhalmi =

Kőhalmi is a Hungarian surname which comes from Kőhalom ("mound of rocks"), the Hungarian name of Rupea, a town in Romania. Notable people with the surname include:

- András Kőhalmi (born 1981), Hungarian footballer
- Emese Kőhalmi (born 2002), Hungarian canoeist
- Gábor Kőhalmi (born 1955), Hungarian footballer
