= Mylanie Barré =

Canadian canoeist

Personal information
- Born: July 25, 1979 (age 46) Budapest, Hungary
Medal record
Women's canoe sprint
Representing Canada
World Championships
| Bronze medal – third place | 2003 Gainesville | K-2 1000 m |

Mylanie Barré (born July 25, 1979) is a Canadian sprint kayaker who has competed since the mid-2000s. She won a bronze medal in the K-2 1000 m event at the 2003 ICF Canoe Sprint World Championships in Gainesville.

Barré also competed in two Summer Olympics, earning her best finish of seventh in the K-2 500 m event at Athens in 2004.

Born in Budapest, Hungary, her parents also competed in the Summer Olympics. Barré's father, Denis, earned his best finish of eighth in the K-2 1000 m event at Montreal in 1976. Her mother, Alexandra, won two medals at Los Angeles in 1984 with a silver in the K-2 500 m and a bronze in the K-4 500 m events.
