= 2025 ICF Canoe Sprint World Championships – Women's K-1 500 metres =

Women's K-1 500 metres at the 2025 ICF Canoe Sprint World Championships
- Venue: Idroscalo Regatta Course
- Location: Milan, Italy
- Dates: 20–22 August
- Competitors: 36 from 36 nations
- Winning time: 1:49.30

Medalists
gold medal	Anna Puławska	Poland
silver medal	Natalia Drobot	Australia
bronze medal	Zsóka Csikós	Hungary

The women's K-1 500 metres competition at the 2025 ICF Canoe Sprint World Championships in Milan took place in Idroscalo Regatta Course.

== Schedule ==
The schedule is as follows:

Date	Time	Round
Wednesday 20 August 2025	14:28	Heats
Friday 22 August 2025	10:55	Semifinals
Saturday 23 August 2025	13:37	Final B
Saturday 23 August 2025	14:41	Final A

== Results ==
=== Heats ===
The fastest six fastest boats (QS) in each heat plus the fastest three remaining boats (qs), advanced to the semi-finals.

==== Heat 1 ====
Rank	Canoeist	Country	Time	Notes
1	Anna Puławska	Poland	1:49.67	QS
2	Beatriz Briones	Mexico	1:51.55	QS
3	Wang Nan	China	1:51.63	QS
4	Pernille Knudsen	Denmark	1:54.53	QS
5	Ekaterina Shubina	Uzbekistan	1:54.81	QS
6	Maya Hosomi	Japan	1:55.98	QS
7	Esti Olivier	South Africa	1:56.41	qS
8	Salya Lefoulon	France	1:57.53	
9	Seon Min-ju	South Korea	1:57.74	

==== Heat 2 ====
Rank	Canoeist	Country	Time	Notes
1	Zsóka Csikós	Hungary	1:53.20	QS
2	Mia Medved	Slovenia	1:54.43	QS
3	Julia Lagerstam	Sweden	1:55.83	QS
4	Melānija Čamane	Latvia	1:57.87	QS
5	Hanna Pavlova	Ukraine	1:58.18	QS
6	Selma Konijn	Netherlands	1:59.49	QS
7	Netta Malinen	Finland	2:00.96	
8	Ramla Baharuddin	Indonesia	2:03.74	
9	Yan Siou-hua	Chinese Taipei	2:09.75	

==== Heat 3 ====
Rank	Canoeist	Country	Time	Notes
1	Natalia Drobot	Australia	1:51.81	QS
2	Lucrezia Zironi	Italy	1:52.95	QS
3	Barbora Betlachová	Czech Republic	1:53.86	QS
4	Elena Wolgamot	United States	1:54.36	QS
5	Michelle Russell	Canada	1:54.62	QS
6	Laura Pedruelo	Spain	1:56.84	QS
7	Franziska Widmer	Switzerland	1:58.49	qS
8	Elise Austvoll Erland	Norway	1:59.75	
9	Saman Soltani	ICF	2:01.33	

==== Heat 4 ====
Rank	Canoeist	Country	Time	Notes
1	Aimee Fisher	New Zealand	1:49.98	QS
2	Milica Novaković	Serbia	1:50.90	QS
3	Iuliia Babashinskaia	Individual Neutral Athletes	1:51.72	QS
4	Yoana Georgieva	Bulgaria	1:54.01	QS
5	Estella Damm	Germany	1:54.60	QS
6	Elizaveta Fedorova	Estonia	1:55.07	QS
7	Tatyana Tokarnitskaya	Kazakhstan	1:55.54	qS
8	Emma Russell	Great Britain	1:55.85	
9	Soniya Devi Phairembam	India	2:09.50	

=== Semifinals ===
The fastest three boats in each semi advanced to the A final. The next three fastest boats in each semi advanced to the final B.

==== Semifinal 1 ====
Rank	Canoeist	Country	Time	Notes
1	Anna Puławska	Poland	1:51.47	FA
2	Mia Medved	Slovenia	1:53.62	FA
3	Lucrezia Zironi	Italy	1:53.84	FA
4	Michelle Russell	Canada	1:54.35	FB
5	Iuliia Babashinskaia	Individual Neutral Athletes	1:55.17	FB
6	Yoana Georgieva	Bulgaria	1:55.70	FB
7	Ekaterina Shubina	Uzbekistan	1:56.17	
8	Selma Konijn	Netherlands	1:56.33	
9	Tatyana Tokarnitskaya	Kazakhstan	1:59.47	

==== Semifinal 2 ====
Rank	Canoeist	Country	Time	Notes
1	Zsóka Csikós	Hungary	1:50.89	FA
2	Milica Novaković	Serbia	1:51.08	FA
3	Wang Nan	China	1:51.33	FA
4	Barbora Betlachová	Czech Republic	1:53.69	FB
5	Pernille Knudsen	Denmark	1:54.13	FB
6	Elena Wolgamot	United States	1:55.56	FB
7	Hanna Pavlova	Ukraine	1:56.46	
8	Esti Olivier	South Africa	1:57.05	
9	Elizaveta Fedorova	Estonia	1:57.66	

==== Semifinal 3 ====
Rank	Canoeist	Country	Time	Notes
1	Aimee Fisher	New Zealand	1:49.96	FA
2	Natalia Drobot	Australia	1:50.51	FA
3	Beatriz Briones	Mexico	1:52.68	FA
4	Julia Lagerstam	Sweden	1:53.92	FB
5	Estella Damm	Germany	1:56.06	FB
6	Laura Pedruelo	Spain	1:57.29	FB
7	Maya Hosomi	Japan	1:57.99	
8	Melānija Čamane	Latvia	1:58.18	
9	Franziska Widmer	Switzerland	1:58.54	

=== Finals ===
==== Final B ====
Competitors in this final raced for positions 10 to 18.

Rank	Canoeist	Country	Time	Notes
1	Julia Lagerstam	Sweden	1:53.30	
2	Michelle Russell	Canada	1:53.42	
3	Barbora Betlachová	Czech Republic	1:54.34	
4	Pernille Knudsen	Denmark	1:54.34	
5	Iuliia Babashinskaia	Individual Neutral Athletes	1:54.36	
6	Elena Wolgamot	United States	1:55.12	
7	Yoana Georgieva	Bulgaria	1:55.36	
8	Estella Damm	Germany	1:56.24	
9	Laura Pedruelo	Spain	1:56.86	

==== Final A ====
Competitors raced for positions 1 to 9, with medals going to the top three.

Rank	Canoeist	Country	Time	Notes
1st place, gold medalist(s)	Anna Puławska	Poland	1:49.30	
2nd place, silver medalist(s)	Natalia Drobot	Australia	1:49.73	
3rd place, bronze medalist(s)	Zsóka Csikós	Hungary	1:49.84	
4	Aimee Fisher	New Zealand	1:50.29	
5	Wang Nan	China	1:50.98	
6	Milica Novaković	Serbia	1:51.56	
7	Lucrezia Zironi	Italy	1:52.11	
8	Beatriz Briones	Mexico	1:52.21	
9	Mia Medved	Slovenia	1:54.47	
