= Wallbaum =

Wallbaum is a surname. Notable people with the surname include:

- Heiderose Wallbaum (born 1951), German canoe sprinter
- Wilhelm Wallbaum (1876-1933), German union official and politician
