= Höfle =

Höfle is a Germanic surname. Notable people with the surname include:

- Frank Höfle (born 1967), German Paralympic athlete
- Hermann Höfle (1911–1962), Austrian Nazi SS officer and Holocaust perpetrator
- Hermann Höfle (SS general) (1898–1947), German Nazi SS general
- Heiderose Wallbaum (born 1951), full name Adelhied Wallbaum-Höfle, West German sprint canoer

== See also ==
- Höfle Telegram, a document discovered in 2000 which reveals statistical information about the Holocaust
