= Pauline Goodwin-Squires =

British canoeist

Pauline Mary Joan Goodwin (née Squires, born 28 May 1946) is a British retired slalom canoeist and sprint canoeist who competed in the 1960s and the 1970s. She is married to fellow canoeist Jon Goodwin.

Goodwin competed at the 1972 Summer Olympics in Munich, finishing 21st in the K-1 slalom event. At the 1976 Summer Olympics in Montreal, she was eliminated in the semifinals of the K-2 500 m sprint, but set a new British record with Hilary Peacock.

She is the first woman to canoe 225 miles of the Colorado River, Grand Canyon, United States in July 1971. She is also the only British canoeist (male or female) to have competed in British teams in all four categories of canoeing: sprint, marathon, wild water racing and slalom.

Goodwin is also a hill climber and circuit racing driver in a Ferrari 328 since 2005.
