= 2026 ICF Canoe Sprint World Championships – Women's K-1 5000 metres =

Women's K-1 5000 metres at the 2026 ICF Canoe Sprint World Championships
- Venue: Lake Malta
- Location: Poznań, Poland
- Dates: 30 August
- Competitors: 29
- Winning time: 27:19.42

Medalists
gold medal	Melina Andersson	Sweden
silver medal	Emese Kohalmi	Hungary
bronze medal	Katerina Milova	Czech Republic

The women's K-1 5000 metres competition at the 2026 ICF Canoe Sprint World Championships in Poznań took place at Lake Malta.

== Schedule ==
The schedule is as follows:

Date	Time	Round
Sunday 30 August 2026	15:15	Final

=== Finals ===
The K1-5000 metre event is held as a straight final. The results of that final were as follows.

Rank	Bib	Name	Nation	Time	Gap
1st place, gold medalist(s)	16	Melina Andersson	Sweden	27:19.42	
2nd place, silver medalist(s)	12	Emese Kohalmi	Hungary	27:51.18	+31.76
3rd place, bronze medalist(s)	9	Katerina Milova	Czech Republic	27:52.07	+32.65
4	8	Elena Mironchenko	Neutral Athlete A	27:57.77	+38.35
5	17	Anna Margrete Sletsjoee	Norway	28:15.03	+55.61
6	11	Uladzislava Skryhanava	Neutral Athlete B	28:17.85	+58.43
7	24	Mariya Povkh	Ukraine	28:18.54	+59.12
8	21	Caroline Heuser	Germany	28:35.72	+1:16.30
9	14	Romana Svecova	Slovakia	28:40.12	+1:20.70
10	18	Hermien Peters	Belgium	28:47.52	+1:28.10
11	15	Estefania Fernandez	Spain	28:51.37	+1:31.95
12	19	Maria Magdalena Garro	Argentina	29:17.28	+1:57.86
13	22	Elizaveta Fedorova	Estonia	29:45.50	+2:26.08
14	30	Zuzanna Blazejczak	Poland	29:51.79	+2:32.37
15	1	Bridgitte Hartley	South Africa	29:55.97	+2:36.55
16	13	Pauline Freslon	France	29:57.61	+2:38.19
17	26	Xiaowan Zhang	China	30:11.81	+2:52.39
18	10	Netta Malinen	Finland	30:26.30	+3:06.88
19	7	Pernille Kuijers Hostrup	Denmark	30:30.63	+3:11.21
20	23	Saman Soltani	Austria	30:35.45	+3:16.03
21	29	Maria Rego Gomes	Portugal	30:37.16	+3:17.74
22	25	Milana Dushev-Janic	Uzbekistan	30:59.27	+3:39.85
23	28	Alina Tverie	Canada	31:33.18	+4:13.76
24	2	Honami Tohda	Japan	1.LAP	
25	27	Aya Ferfad	Algeria	2.LAP	
26	5	Samara Antony Chacko	India	3.LAP	
27	6	Kaitlyn Mcelroy	United States	4.LAP	
	3	Sandra Scalia	Colombia	DSQ	
	20	Franziska Widmer	Switzerland	DNS	
	4	Sabiha Ben Othmane	Tunisia	DNF	
