= Elisabeta =

Elisabeta is a Romanian female name, equivalent to Elizabeth (given name), and may refer to:

- Elisabeta Abrudeanu
- Elisabeta Anghel
- Elisabeta Bǎbeanu
- Elisabeta Bostan
- Elisabeta Ionescu
- Elisabeta Lazăr
- Elisabeta Lipă
- Elisabeta Movilă
- Elisabeta Polihroniade
- Elisabeta Rizea
- Elisabeta Turcu
- Elisabeta Știrbey

Two royal figures are known as Elisabeta in Romanian:

- Elisabeth of Wied
- Elisabeth of Romania
  - Elisabeta Palace
