= 2024 ICF Canoe Sprint World Championships – Women's K-1 1000 metres =

Women's K-1 1000 metres at the 2024 ICF Canoe Sprint World Championships
- Venue: Rowing and Canoeing Race Course in Samarkand
- Location: Samarkand, Uzbekistan
- Dates: 23–24 August
- Competitors: 18 from 18 nations
- Winning time: 4:03.433

Medalists
gold medal	Emese Kőhalmi	Hungary
silver medal	Maryna Litvinchuk	Authorised Neutral Athletes
bronze medal	Melina Andersson	Sweden

The women's K-1 1000 metres competition at the 2024 ICF Canoe Sprint World Championships in Samarkand took place in Rowing and Canoeing Race Course in Samarkand.

== Schedule ==
The schedule is as follows:

Date	Time	Round
Friday 23 August 2024	9:00	Heats
Friday 23 August 2024	11:00	Semifinals
Saturday 24 August 2024	14:04	Final

== Results ==
=== Heats ===
The fastest three boats in each heat advanced directly to the final.
The next four fastest boats in each heat, plus the fastest remaining boat advanced to the semifinal.

==== Heat 1 ====
Rank	Canoeist	Country	Time	Notes
1	Emese Kőhalmi	Hungary	3:59.440	QF
2	Maryna Litvinchuk	Individual Neutral Athletes	4:01.792	QF
3	Bianka Sidová	Slovakia	4:04.705	QF
4	Arina Tanatmisheva	Uzbekistan	4:07.549	QS
5	Adéla Házová	Czech Republic	4:13.900	QS
6	Tatyana Tokarnitskaya	Kazakhstan	4:14.560	QS
7	Pauline Freslon	France	4:19.684	QS
8	Jo Shin-young	South Korea	4:20.930	qS
9	Justyna Iskrzycka	Poland	4:25.141	

==== Heat 2 ====
Rank	Canoeist	Country	Time	Notes
1	Maria Virik	Norway	4:00.049	QF
2	Isabel Maria Contreras	Spain	4:01.648	QF
3	Melina Andersson	Sweden	4:02.447	QF
4	Hanna Pavlova	Ukraine	4:15.276	QS
5	Kitty Schiphorst Preuper	Netherlands	4:15.720	QS
6	Anamaria Govorčinović	Croatia	4:15.726	QS
7	Doreen Kemp	New Zealand	4:20.418	QS
8	Saman Soltani	ICF	4:22.014	
9	Ana Šteblaj	Slovenia	4:22.577	

=== Semifinal ===
The fastest three boats advanced to the A final.

Rank	Canoeist	Country	Time	Notes
1	Adéla Házová	Czech Republic	4:12.674	QF
2	Anamaria Govorčinović	Croatia	4:14.136	QF
3	Hanna Pavlova	Ukraine	4:14.148	QF
4	Kitty Schiphorst Preuper	Netherlands	4:16.662	
5	Arina Tanatmisheva	Uzbekistan	4:21.221	
6	Tatyana Tokarnitskaya	Kazakhstan	4:23.029	
7	Doreen Kemp	New Zealand	4:23.101	
8	Pauline Freslon	France	4:26.674	
9	Jo Shin-young	South Korea	4:32.868	

=== Final ===
Competitors raced for positions 1 to 9, with medals going to the top three.

Rank	Canoeist	Country	Time
1st place, gold medalist(s)	Emese Kőhalmi	Hungary	4:03.433
2nd place, silver medalist(s)	Maryna Litvinchuk	Individual Neutral Athletes	4:07.277
3rd place, bronze medalist(s)	Melina Andersson	Sweden	4:07.687
4	Isabel Maria Contreras	Spain	4:10.240
5	Anamaria Govorčinović	Croatia	4:12.009
6	Adéla Házová	Czech Republic	4:12.758
7	Bianka Sidová	Slovakia	4:13.778
8	Maria Virik	Norway	4:15.971
9	Hanna Pavlova	Ukraine	4:18.545
