= Canoeing at the 1984 Summer Olympics – Women's K-2 500 metres =

The women's K-2 500 metres event was a pairs kayaking event conducted as part of the Canoeing at the 1984 Summer Olympics program.

== Medalists ==
Gold	Silver	Bronze
Agneta Andersson and Anna Olsson (SWE)	Alexandra Barre and Susan Holloway (CAN)	Josefa Idem and Barbara Schüttpelz (FRG)

== Results ==
=== Heats ===
Ten crews entered in two heats on August 6. The top three finishers from each of the heats advanced directly to the final while the remaining four teams were relegated to the semifinal.

Heat 1
1.	Alexandra Barre and Susan Holloway (CAN)	1:51.41	QF
2.	Bernadette Brégeon and Cathérine Mathevon (FRA)	1:53.61	QF
3.	Lucy Perrett and Lesley Smither (GBR)	1:54.98	QF
4.	Marleen Kuppens and Lutgarde Thijs (BEL)	1:56.17	QS
5.	Ho Kim Fai and To Kit Yong (HKG)	1:50.51	QS
Heat 2
1.	Agneta Andersson and Anna Olsson (SWE)	1:47.82	QF
2.	Agafia Constantin and Nastasia Ionescu (ROU)	1:49.85	QF
3.	Josefa Idem and Barbara Schüttpelz (FRG)	1:50.84	QF
4.	Shirley Dery and Leslie Klein (USA)	1:54.61	QS
5.	Kari Ofstad and Anne Wahl (NOR)	1:56.19	QS

=== Semifinal ===
The top three finishers in the semifinal (raced on August 8) advanced to the final.

Semifinal
1.	Shirley Dery and Leslie Klein (USA)	1:53.69	QF
2.	Kari Ofstad and Anne Wahl (NOR)	1:55.98	QF
3.	Marleen Kuppens and Lutgarde Thijs (BEL)	1:57.88	QF
4.	Ho Kim Fai and To Kit Yong (HKG)	2:11.71

=== Final ===
The final was held on August 10.

Gold	Agneta Andersson and Anna Olsson (SWE)	1:45.25
Silver	Alexandra Barre and Susan Holloway (CAN)	1:47.13
Bronze	Josefa Idem and Barbara Schüttpelz (FRG)	1:47.32
4.	Agafia Constantin and Nastasia Ionescu (ROU)	1:47.56
5.	Shirley Dery and Leslie Klein (USA)	1:49.51
6.	Bernadette Brégeon and Cathérine Mathevon (FRA)	1:51.40
7.	Kari Ofstad and Anne Wahl (NOR)	1:51.61
8.	Lucy Perrett and Lesley Smither (GBR)	1:51.73
9.	Marleen Kuppens and Lutgarde Thijs (BEL)	1:51.92
