= 2026 ICF Canoe Sprint World Championships – Women's K-1 1000 metres =

Women's K-1 1000 metres at the 2026 ICF Canoe Sprint World Championships
- Venue: Lake Malta
- Location: Poznań, Poland
- Dates: 26-28 August
- Competitors: 28 from 28 nations
- Winning time: 4:11.95

Medalists
gold medal	Zsoka Csikos	Hungary
silver medal	Laia Pelachs	Spain
bronze medal	Pernille Knudsen	Denmark

The women's K-1 1000 metres competition at the 2026 ICF Canoe Sprint World Championships in Poznań took place at Lake Malta.

== Schedule ==
The schedule is as follows:

Date	Time	Round
Wednesday 26 August 2026	11:50	Heats
Thursday 27 August 2026	16:50	Semifinals
Friday 28 August 2026	14:50	Final B
Friday 28 August 2026	15:33	Final A

== Record ==
The best performance previously in this discipline was:

Women's K-1 1000 metres
World Best	3:49.42	Teneale Hatton (NZL)	Moscow (Russia)

== Results ==
=== Heats ===
Four heats were held. The results of the heats was as follows:

Qualification rule : First six in each heat (SF) plus next three fastest (qBT) qualify for semi-finals; remainder are eliminated.

Heat 1

11:50

Rank	Lane	Name	Nation	Time	Gap	Notes
1	5	Zsoka Csikos	Hungary	4:32.81		SF
2	6	Laia Pelachs	Spain	4:35.84	+3.03	SF
3	4	Pernille Knudsen	Denmark	4:45.62	+12.81	SF
4	7	Savvia Kyriaki Hadjicharalambous	Cyprus	4:47.36	+14.55	SF
5	8	Bridgitte Hartley	South Africa	4:47.83	+15.02	SF
6	2	Tatyana Gladkova	Kazakhstan	4:48.47	+15.66	SF
7	3	Karen Itzel Berrelleza Torres	Mexico	4:49.98	+17.17	qBT

Heat 2

11:57

Rank	Lane	Name	Nation	Time	Gap	Notes
1	6	Elizaveta Fedorova	Estonia	4:28.82		SF
2	3	Elena Mironchenko	Neutral Athlete	4:29.24	+0.42	SF
3	7	Olivia Clues	Australia	4:32.68	+3.86	SF
4	2	Elena Ricchiero	Italy	4:35.98	+7.16	SF
5	5	Romana Svecova	Slovakia	4:38.22	+9.40	SF
6	4	Netta Malinen	Finland	4:43.98	+15.16	SF
	8	Florence Prossy Namanda	Uganda	DNS		

Heat 3

12:04

Rank	Lane	Name	Nation	Time	Gap	Notes
1	4	Caroline Heuser	Germany	4:32.32		SF
2	3	Weronika Marczewska	Poland	4:34.75	+2.43	SF
3	6	Lucy Lee-Smith	Great Britain	4:36.39	+4.07	SF
4	5	Mia Medved	Slovenia	4:37.74	+5.42	SF
5	8	Olivia Larsson	Sweden	4:46.38	+14.06	SF
6	7	Kaitlyn Mcelroy	United States	4:46.42	+14.10	SF
7	2	Alina Tverie	Canada	5:00.35	+28.03	qBT

Heat 4

12:11

Rank	Lane	Name	Nation	Time	Gap	Notes
1	5	Franziska Widmer	Switzerland	4:34.87		SF
2	4	Barbora Betlachova	Czech Republic	4:36.00	+1.13	SF
3	8	Liudmila Sinkel	Neutral Athlete	4:38.28	+3.41	SF
4	6	Mengyuan Yang	China	4:43.36	+8.49	SF
5	3	Saman Soltani	Austria	5:00.45	+25.58	SF
6	2	Aya Ferfad	Algeria	5:08.88	+34.01	SF
7	7	Samara Antony Chacko	India	5:37.16	+1:02.29	qBT

=== Semi finals ===
Three semifinals were held.

Qualification rule : First three in each heat to A final: Next three in each heat to B final; remainder are eliminated

Semifinal 1

16:50

Rank	Lane	Name	Nation	Time	Gap	Notes
1	5	Zsoka Csikos	Hungary	4:24.59		FA
2	4	Elena Mironchenko	Neutral Athlete A	4:25.73	+1.14	FA
3	6	Weronika Marczewska	Poland	4:27.96	+3.37	FA
4	3	Liudmila Sinkel	Neutral Athlete B	4:32.63	+8.04	FB
5	8	Bridgitte Hartley	South Africa	4:36.10	+11.51	FB
6	7	Mengyuan Yang	China	4:36.14	+11.55	FB
7	2	Olivia Larsson	Sweden	4:40.75	+16.16	
8	1	Netta Malinen	Finland	4:40.98	+16.39	
9	9	Karen Itzel Berrelleza Torres	Mexico	4:49.13	+24.54	

Semifinal 2

16:57

Rank	Lane	Name	Nation	Time	Gap	Notes
1	6	Pernille Knudsen	Denmark	4:21.48		FA
2	5	Elizaveta Fedorova	Estonia	4:22.45	+0.97	FA
3	4	Barbora Betlachova	Czech Republic	4:24.28	+2.80	FA
4	8	Romana Svecova	Slovakia	4:25.75	+4.27	FB
5	7	Mia Medved	Slovenia	4:27.05	+5.57	FB
6	2	Savvia Kyriaki Hadjicharalambous	Cyprus	4:27.89	+6.41	FB
7	3	Lucy Lee-Smith	Great Britain	4:28.21	+6.73	
8	1	Alina Tverie	Canada	4:49.61	+28.13	
9	9	Aya Ferfad	Algeria	5:02.88	+41.40	

Semifinal 3

17:04

Rank	Lane	Name	Nation	Time	Gap	Notes
1	4	Caroline Heuser	Germany	4:20.63		FA
2	6	Laia Pelachs	Spain	4:21.63	+1.00	FA
3	5	Franziska Widmer	Switzerland	4:24.83	+4.20	FA
4	3	Olivia Clues	Australia	4:26.30	+5.67	FB
5	7	Elena Ricchiero	Italy	4:29.77	+9.14	FB
6	2	Saman Soltani	Austria	4:32.81	+12.18	FB
7	8	Kaitlyn Mcelroy	United States	4:37.51	+16.88	
8	1	Tatyana Gladkova	Kazakhstan	4:42.67	+22.04	
9	9	Samara Antony Chacko	India	5:20.86	+1:00.23	

=== Finals ===
The results of the finals were as follows:

B final

14:10

Rank	Lane	Name	Nation	Time	Gap	Notes
1	6	Olivia Clues	Australia	4:40.52		
2	5	Romana Svecova	Slovakia	4:40.79	+0.27	
3	7	Mia Medved	Slovenia	4:44.72	+4.20	
4	3	Elena Ricchiero	Italy	4:46.18	+5.66	
5	9	Mengyuan Yang	China	4:48.20	+7.68	
6	8	Bridgitte Hartley	South Africa	4:48.76	+8.24	
7	4	Liudmila Sinkel	Neutral Athletes B	4:48.91	+8.39	
8	2	Savvia Kyriaki Hadjicharalambous	Cyprus	4:51.91	+11.39	
9	1	Saman Soltani	Austria	5:05.66	+25.14	

A final

15:33

Rank	Lane	Name	Nation	Time	Gap	Notes
1st place, gold medalist(s)	6	Zsoka Csikos	Hungary	4:11.95		
2nd place, silver medalist(s)	7	Laia Pelachs	Spain	4:14.76	+2.81	
3rd place, bronze medalist(s)	5	Pernille Knudsen	Denmark	4:17.30	+5.35	
4	8	Barbora Betlachova	Czech Republic	4:18.65	+6.70	
5	4	Caroline Heuser	Germany	4:19.15	+7.20	
5	3	Elizaveta Fedorova	Estonia	4:19.15	+7.20	
7	9	Weronika Marczewska	Poland	4:19.80	+7.85	
8	1	Franziska Widmer	Switzerland	4:22.28	+10.33	
9	2	Elena Mironchenko	Neutral Athletes A	4:22.85	+10.90	
