= Catherine Burelle =

Belgian canoeist (born 1959)

Catherine Burelle (born 21 February 1959) is a Belgian canoe sprinter who competed in the mid-1970s. Together with Marleen Kuppens, she was eliminated in the repechages of the K-2 500 m event at the 1976 Summer Olympics in Montreal.
