= Annemiek Derckx =

Dutch sprint canoer

Personal information
- Born: 12 April 1954 (age 72) Beegden, Netherlands
Medal record
Women's canoe sprint
Olympic Games
Bronze medal – third place	1984 Los Angeles	K-1 500 m
Bronze medal – third place	1988 Seoul	K-2 500 m
World Championships
Silver medal – second place	1987 Duisburg	K-2 500 m
Bronze medal – third place	1985 Mechelen	K-2 500 m

Anna Maria ("Annemiek") Josephine Derckx (born 12 April 1954 in Beegden, Limburg) is a Dutch sprint canoeist who competed in the 1980s. Competing in two Summer Olympics, she earned two bronze medals (1984: K-1 500 m, 1988: K-2 500 m).

Derckx also won two medals in the K-2 500 m event at the ICF Canoe Sprint World Championships with a silver in 1987 and a bronze in 1985.
