= Ho Kim Fai =

Hong Kong canoeist and rower (born 1962)

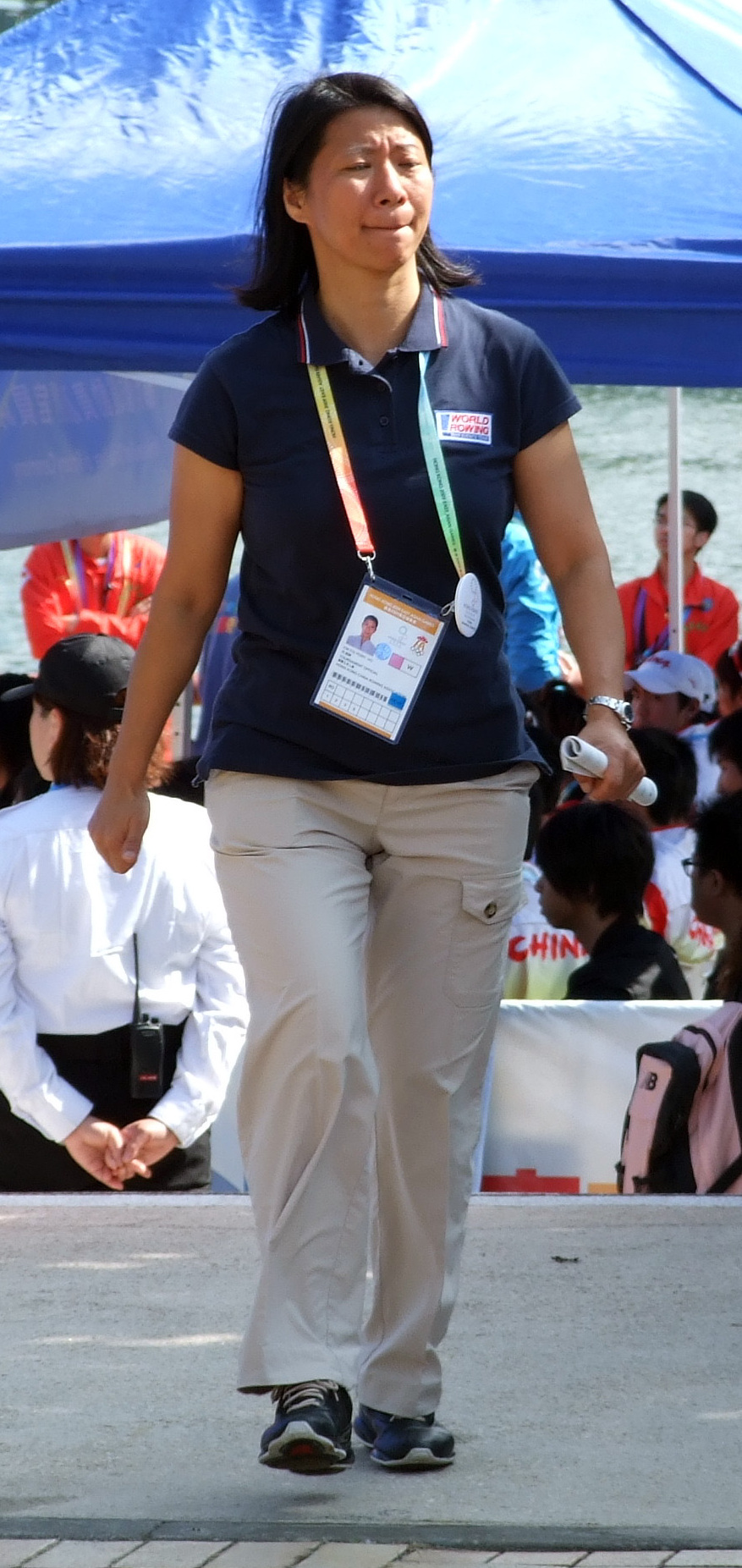
Ho Kim Fai in 2009

Ho Kim Fai (Chinese: 何劍暉; Jyutping: ho^{4} gim^{3} fai^{1}; born 27 November 1962) is a Hong Kong rower and canoe sprinter who competed from the mid-1980s to the early 1990s. At the 1984 Summer Olympics in Los Angeles, she was eliminated in the semifinals of both the K-1 500 m and the K-2 500 m events in canoeing.

Eight years later in Barcelona, Ho finished 15th in the single sculls event.
