= Jana Polakovičová =

Czechoslovak sprint canoer (born 1961)

Jana Polakovičová (born 28 June 1961) is a Czechoslovak sprint canoeist who competed in the early 1980s. At the 1980 Summer Olympics in Moscow, she was eliminated in the semifinals of both the K-1 500 m and the K-2 500 m events.
