= Luisa Ponchio =

Italian canoeist (born 1961)

Luisa Ponchio (born July 5, 1961 in Verbania) is an Italian sprint canoer who competed in the early 1980s. At the 1980 Summer Olympics in Moscow, she was eliminated in the semifinals of the K-2 500 m event.
