= Sylvaine Deltour =

French sprint canoer

Sylvaine Deltour (born August 25, 1953) is a French sprint canoer who competed in the mid-1970s. At the 1976 Summer Olympics in Montreal, she reached the semifinals of the K-2 500 m event. She was French champion from 1974 to 1976.

In the years that followed, she became involved with the French Canoe-Kayak Federation, of which she was a leading member. She also took part in the management of the Amicale des Internationaux Français du Canoë-Kayak.

She is a member of the Chambéry Le Bourget Canoe-Kayak club.

In 2024, in connection with the Paris Olympic Games, Sylvaine Deltour is co-curator of a major retrospective exhibition retracing 100 years of canoeing at the Olympic Games. This exhibition is presented on the web and near the Vaires-sur-Marne Olympic water sports stadium, where the canoe-kayak events are held.

== Bibliography ==
- Sports-reference.com profile
