= 2022 ICF Canoe Sprint World Championships – Women's K-1 5000 metres =

Women's K-1 5000 metres at the 2022 ICF Canoe Sprint World Championships
- Venue: Lake Banook
- Location: Dartmouth, Canada
- Dates: 7 August
- Competitors: 11 from 11 nations
- Winning time: 23:56.44

Medalists
gold medal	Emese Kőhalmi	Hungary
silver medal	Jule Hake	Germany
bronze medal	Jennifer Egan-Simmons	Ireland
bronze medal	Sára Mihalik	Finland

The women's K-1 5000 metres competition at the 2022 ICF Canoe Sprint World Championships in Dartmouth took place on Lake Banook.

== Schedule ==
The schedule is as follows:

Date	Time	Round
Sunday 7 August 2022	14:40	Final

== Results ==
As a long-distance event, it was held as a direct final.

Rank	Canoeist	Country	Time
1st place, gold medalist(s)	Emese Kőhalmi	Hungary	23:56.44
2nd place, silver medalist(s)	Jule Hake	Germany	24:00.17
3rd place, bronze medalist(s)	Jennifer Egan-Simmons	Ireland	24:41.51
3rd place, bronze medalist(s)	Sára Mihalik	Finland	24:41.51
5	Lize Broekx	Belgium	24:46.78
6	Kaitlyn McElroy	United States	KO
7	Rebecca Georgsdotter	Sweden	KO
8	Angelica See	Singapore	KO
9	Susanna Cicali	Italy	KO
	Anna Mus	Netherlands	DNF
	Madeline Schmidt	Canada	DNF
