= Katarzyna Kulczak =

Polish canoeist

Medal record

Women's canoe sprint

World Championships
Bronze medal – third place	1975 Belgrade	K-2 500 m

Katarzyna Maria Kulczak (born September 25, 1954 in Bydgoszcz) is a Polish sprint canoer who competed in the mid-1970s. She won a bronze medal in the K-2 500 m event at the 1975 ICF Canoe Sprint World Championships in Belgrade.

Kulczak also finished sixth in the K-2 500 m event at the 1976 Summer Olympics in Montreal, Quebec, Canada.
