= Ingeborg Rasmussen =

Norwegian canoeist

Ingeborg Nancy Rasmussen (born 1960) is a Norwegian sprint canoer. She represented Norway in the 1984 Summer Olympics and 1992 Summer Olympics. In 1984, she competed in the K-1 500m event, placing fourth, as well as in the K-4 500 m, placing sixth. In 1992, she placed sixth in the K-4 500m and seventh in the K-2 500m.

She is married to Arne Sletsjøe, and they have two children. Her daughter, Anna Margrete Sletsjøe, is an Olympic canoeist.
