= Lutgarde Thijs =

Belgian canoeist (born 1962)

Lutgarde Thijs (born 2 January 1962 in Neerpelt) is a Belgian canoe sprinter who competed in the mid-1980s. She finished ninth in the K-2 500 m event at the 1984 Summer Olympics in Los Angeles.
