= Regina Schmidt =

German canoeist (born 1958)

Regina Schmidt (born 24 February 1958 in Mannheim) is a West German canoe sprinter who competed in the mid-1980s. At the 1984 Summer Olympics in Los Angeles, she finished fifth in the K-4 500 m event.
