= Alexandra Barré =

Canadian canoe racer

Personal information
- Born: January 29, 1958 (age 68) Budapest, Hungary
Medal record
Women's canoe sprint
Representing Canada
Olympic Games
Silver medal – second place	1984 Los Angeles	K-2 500 m
Bronze medal – third place	1984 Los Angeles	K-4 500 m

Alexandra Barré (born January 29, 1958) is a Hungarian-born Canadian sprint kayaker who competed in the mid-1980s to the early 2000s. She won two medals at the 1984 Summer Olympics in Los Angeles with a silver in the K-2 500 m event and a bronze in the K-4 500 m event.

Barré's husband Denis, competed as a canoer for Canada in two Summer Olympics, earning his best finish of eighth in the K-2 1000 m event at Montreal in 1976. Their daughter, Mylanie, has also competed in two Summer Olympics of her own, earning her best finish of seventh in the K-2 500 m event at Athens in 2004.
