= Frances Wetherall =

British sprint canoer (born 1952)

Frances Wetherall (born 3 February 1952) is a British canoe sprinter who competed in the early 1980s. At the 1980 Summer Olympics in Moscow, she finished eighth in the K-2 500 m event.
