= Canoeing at the 1984 Summer Olympics – Women's K-4 500 metres =

The women's K-4 500 metres event was a fours kayaking event conducted as part of the Canoeing at the 1984 Summer Olympics program. This event debuted at these games.

== Medalists ==
| Gold | Silver | Bronze |
| Romania; Agafia Constantin; Nastasia Ionescu; Tecla Marinescu; Maria Ştefan | Sweden; Agneta Andersson; Anna Olsson; Eva Karlsson; Susanne Wiberg | Canada; Alexandra Barre; Lucie Guay; Susan Holloway; Barbara Olmsted |

== Final ==
With only seven crews entered, a final was held on August 11. This was the first time that less than nine competitors competed in a final at the Summer Olympics since the men's C-2 1000 m event at Melbourne in 1956. As of the 2024 Summer Olympics, it is the only canoeing event since 1956 that did not have eight or nine competitors or crews in the final.

| Gold | Agafia Constantin, Nastasia Ionescu, Tecla Marinescu, and Maria Ştefan (ROU) | 1:38.34 |
| Silver | Agneta Andersson, Anna Olsson, Eva Karlsson, and Susanne Wiberg (SWE) | 1:38.87 |
| Bronze | Alexandra Barre, Lucie Guay, Susan Holloway, and Barbara Olmsted (CAN) | 1:39.40 |
| 4. | Shelia Conover, Shirley Dery, Leslie Klein, and Ann Turner (USA) | 1:40.49 |
| 5. | Josefa Idem, Regina Schmidt, Barbara Schüttpelz, and Judith Skolnik (FRG) | 1:42.68 |
| 6. | Wenche Lægraid, Kari Ofstad, Ingeborg Rasmussen, and Anne Wahl (NOR) | 1:42.97 |
| 7. | Janine Lawler, Lucy Perrett, Lesley Smither, and Deborah Watson (GBR) | 1:46.30 |

In the official report, there was no time taken for the British team at the 250 m mark.
