= Zsóka Csikós =

Hungarian canoeist (born 2001)

Personal information
- Born: 23 January 2001 (age 25)

Sport
- Country: Hungary
- Sport: Canoe sprint Canoe marathon
- Events: K-1 500 m, K-1 1000 m, K-1 5000 m
Medal record
Representing Hungary
Women's canoe sprint
World Championships
Gold medal – first place	2025 Milan	K-1 1000 m
Gold medal – first place	2026 Poznań	K-1 1000 m
Bronze medal – third place	2025 Milan	K-1 500 m
European Championships
Gold medal – first place	2025 Račice	K-1 500 m
Gold medal – first place	2025 Račice	K-1 1000 m
Gold medal – first place	2025 Račice	K-1 5000 m
Bronze medal – third place	2022 Munich	K-4 500 m
Bronze medal – third place	2026 Montemor-o-Velho	K-1 500 m
Women's canoe marathon
World Championships
Gold medal – first place	2024 Metković	K-2
Gold medal – first place	2025 Győr	K-1 short race
World Games
Bronze medal – third place	2022 Birmingham	K-1 short race

Zsóka Csikós (born 23 January 2001) is a Hungarian canoeist.

== Career ==
In July 2022, she competed at the 2022 World Games in canoe marathon and won a bronze medal in the K-1 short race.

In September 2024, Csikós competed at the 2024 ICF Canoe Marathon World Championships and won a gold medal in the K-2 event, along with Emese Kőhalmi, with a time of 1:53:01.90.

In June 2025, Csikós competed at the 2025 Canoe Sprint European Championships and won gold medals in the K-1 500 metres, K-1 1000 metres, and K-1 5000 metres events. In August 2025, she competed at the 2025 ICF Canoe Sprint World Championships and won a gold medal in the K-1 1000 metres, and a bronze medal in the K-1 500 metres. The next month she competed at the 2025 ICF Canoe Marathon World Championships and won a gold medal in the K-1 short race with a time of 15:21.64.

In August 2026, she competed at the 2026 ICF Canoe Sprint World Championships and won a gold medal in the K-1 1000 metres with a time of 4:11.95, defending her world championship from the previous year.
