= Anne Dodge =

Canadian sprint kayaker

Personal information
- Born: March 26, 1958 (age 67); Halifax, Nova Scotia, Canada

Ann Dodge (born March 26, 1958) is a Canadian sprint kayaker who competed in the mid-1970s.

Dodge was the first woman from Nova Scotia ever selected to the Canadian Olympic team in sprint kayak. At the 1976 Summer Olympics in Montreal, she finished eighth in the K-2 500 m event. She and partner Sue Holloway were the first Canadian women ever to reach an Olympic final in the sport.

Dodge was named Nova Scotia Athlete of the Year in 1973 and was inducted into the Nova Scotia Sports Hall of Fame in 1994. She earned a bachelor's degree in Physical Education from Acadia University and a master's from the University of New Brunswick. She is currently a lecturer in kinesiology at Acadia.
