= Kari Ofstad =

Norwegian canoeist

Kari Ofstad (born 26 June 1961) is a Norwegian sprint canoeist who competed in the mid-1980s. At the 1984 Summer Olympics in Los Angeles, she finished sixth in the K-4 500 m event and seventh in the K-2 500 m event.
