= Maria Kazanecka =

Polish canoeist (born 1955)

Medal record

Women's canoe sprint

World Championships
Bronze medal – third place	1975 Belgrade	K-2 500 m

Maria Jolanta Kazanecka-Górecka (later Bajka, born 29 August 1955 in Poznań) is a Polish sprint canoeist who competed in the mid-1970s. She won a bronze medal in the K-2 500 m event at the 1975 ICF Canoe Sprint World Championships in Belgrade.

Kazanecka also finished sixth in the K-2 500 m event at the 1976 Summer Olympics in Montreal.

Her husband, Kazimierz Górecki (1954–1977), also competed as a sprint canoer in the 1970s.
