= Linda Murray-Dragan =

American canoeist

Linda Murray-Dragan (born September 18, 1952) is an American sprint canoer who competed in the early 1970s. She was born in Washington, D.C. and attended Oxon Hill High School in Maryland. She graduated from the University of Maryland in 1976. She was eliminated in the semifinals of the K-2 500 m event at the 1972 Summer Olympics in Munich. Four years later in Montreal, Murray-Dragan was also eliminated in the semifinals of the K-2 500 m event.
