= Karin Olsson (canoeist) =

Swedish sprint canoer (born 1961)

Medal record

Women's canoe sprint

World Championships
Bronze medal – third place	1981 Nottingham	K-4 500 m
Bronze medal – third place	1982 Belgrade	K-2 500 m

Karin Olsson (born November 23, 1961) is a Swedish sprint canoer who competed in the early 1980s. She won two bronze medals at the ICF Canoe Sprint World Championships with one in the K-2 500 m (1982) and one in the K-4 500 m (1981).

Olsson also finished fifth in the K-2 500 m event at the 1980 Summer Olympics in Moscow.
