= Wenche Lægraid =

Norwegian canoeist (born 1965)

Wenche Lægraid (born March 4, 1965, in Kristiansand) is a Norwegian sprint canoer who competed in the mid-1980s. At the 1984 Summer Olympics in Los Angeles, she finished sixth in the K-4 500 m event.
