= Elizabeth Blencowe =

Australian sprint canoeist

Elizabeth Blencowe Thompson (born 10 January 1961) is an Australian sprint canoeist who competed in the mid-1980s. At the 1984 Summer Olympics in Los Angeles, she finished eighth in the K-1 500 m event.

She is married to New Zealand Olympic kayaker Alan Thompson and has lived in Gisborne, New Zealand with him since 1981; as of 2017 they coached the Poverty Bay Kayak Club there.
