= Antonina Melnikova =

Belarusian sprint canoer (born 1958)

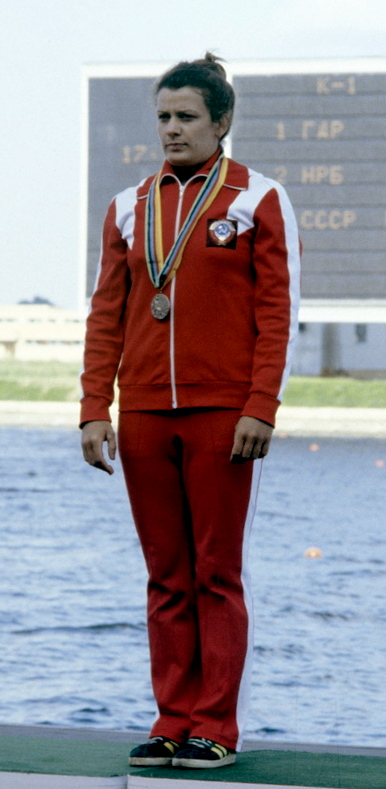
- Melnikova at the 1980 Olympics

Personal information
- Born: 19 February 1958 (age 68) Rahachow, Byelorussian SSR, Soviet Union (now Belarus)
- Height: 170 cm (5 ft 7 in)
- Weight: 65 kg (143 lb)

Sport
- Sport: Canoe racing
- Club: Spartak Rahachow
Medal record
Representing the Soviet Union
Olympic Games
Bronze medal – third place	1980 Moscow	K-1 500 m

Antonina Alekseyevna Melnikova (Belarusian: Антаніна Аляксееўна Мельнікава, romanized: Antanina Aliaksiejeŭna Mielnikava; Russian: Антонина Алексеевна Мельникова, born 19 February 1958) is a Belarusian sprint canoer who competed for the Soviet Union. She won a bronze medal in the K-1 500 m event at the 1980 Olympics.
