= Helena Vašáková =

Czechoslovak sprint canoer (born 1961)

Helena Vašáková (born April 27, 1961) is a Czechoslovak sprint canoer who competed in the early 1980s. She was eliminated in the semifinals of the K-2 500 m event at the 1980 Summer Olympics in Moscow.
