= Leslie Klein =

American sprint canoer (born 1954)

Leslie Klein (born December 20, 1954) is an American sprint canoer who competed in the mid-1980s. At the 1984 Summer Olympics in Los Angeles, she finished fourth in the K-4 500 m event and fifth in the K-2 500 m event.

Klein attended Middlebury College as a member of the class of 1978.
