= Helen Jacobsohn =

Australian canoeist

Helen Jacobsohn (born 17 June 1945 in Brisbane, Queensland) is an Australian sprint canoeist who competed in the mid-1970s. She was eliminated in the repechages of K-2 500 m event the 1976 Summer Olympics in Montreal.
