= Nina Gopova =

Soviet sprint canoeist (born 1953)

Medal record

Women's canoe sprint

Representing Soviet Union

Olympic Games
Gold medal – first place	1976 Montreal	K-2 500 m
Silver medal – second place	1980 Moscow	K-2 500 m

World Championships
Gold medal – first place	1973 Tampere	K-1 500 m
Gold medal – first place	1973 Tampere	K-4 500 m
Silver medal – second place	1973 Tampere	K-2 500 m
Silver medal – second place	1974 Mexico City	K-1 500 m
Silver medal – second place	1974 Mexico City	K-4 500 m

Nina Yuryevna Gopova-Trofimova (Russian: Нина Юрьевна Гопова-Трофимова; born 4 May 1953) is a Soviet sprint canoer who competed from the mid-1970s to the early 1980s. Competing in two Summer Olympics, she won two medals in the K-2 500 m event with a gold in 1976 and a silver in 1980.

Gopova also won five medals at the ICF Canoe Sprint World Championships with two golds (K-1 500 m and K-4 500 m: both 1973) and three silvers (K-1 500 m: 1974, K-2 500 m: 1973, K-4 500 m: 1974).
