= Mária Zakariás =

Hungarian canoeist

Medal record

Women's canoe sprint

Olympic Games
Bronze medal – third place	1980 Moscow	K-2 500 m

World Championships
Silver medal – second place	1973 Tampere	K-4 500 m
Bronze medal – third place	1974 Mexico City	K-2 500 m
Bronze medal – third place	1975 Belgrade	K-4 500 m

Mária Zakariás (born December 28, 1952) is a Hungarian sprint canoer who competed from the mid-1970s to the early 1980s. She won a bronze medal in the K-2 500 m event at the 1980 Summer Olympics in Moscow.

Zakariás also won three medals at the ICF Canoe Sprint World Championships with a silver (K-4 500 m: 1973) and two bronzes (K-2 500 m: 1974, K-4 500 m: 1975).
