= Beegden =

Beegden Bieëgdje
- Village
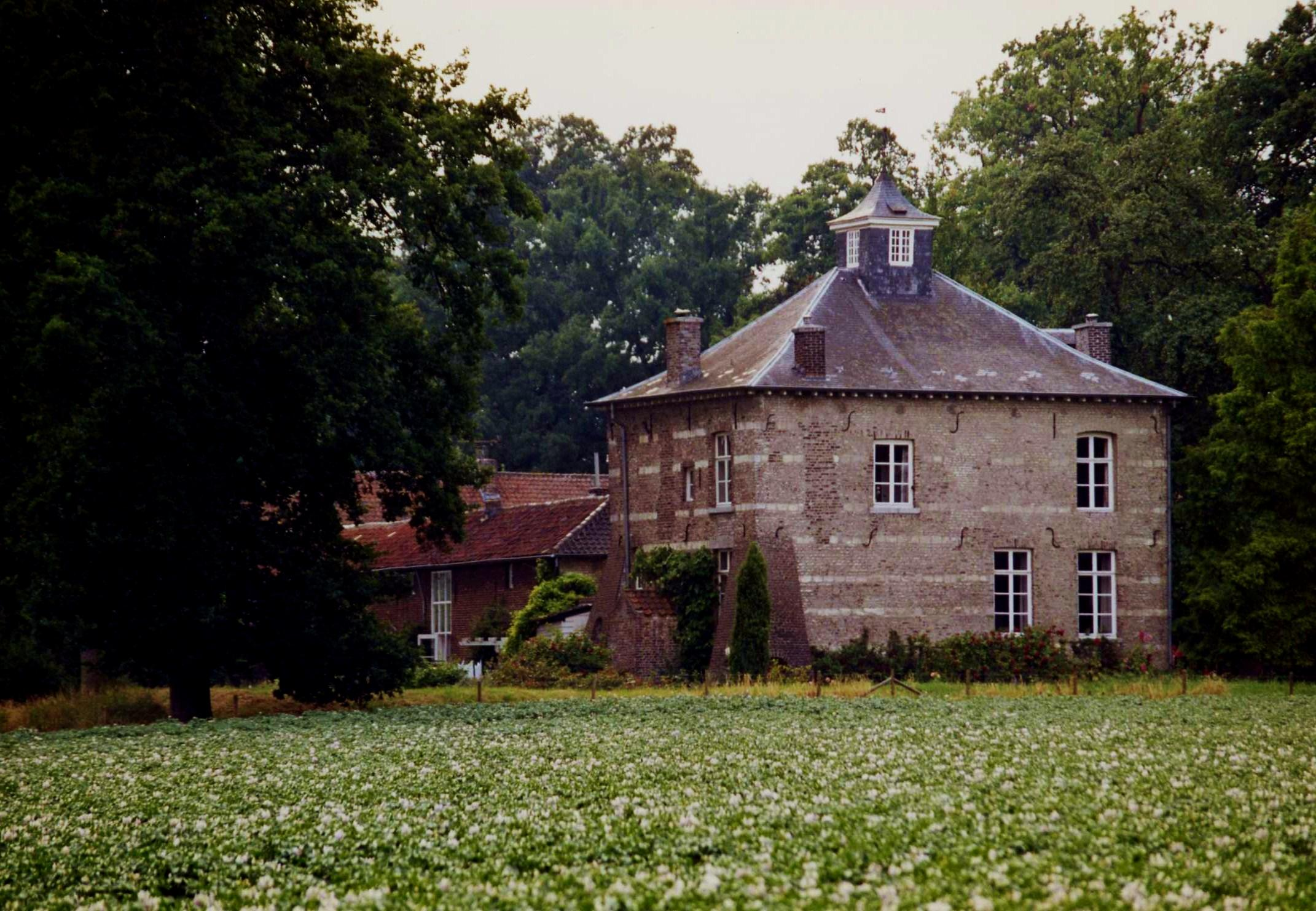
- Nederhoven estate

- Location in the Netherlands Location in the province of Limburg in the Netherlands
- Coordinates: 51°11′N 5°55′E
- Country: Netherlands
- Province: Limburg
- Municipality: Maasgouw

Area
  - Total: 8.14 km^{2} (3.14 sq mi)
- Elevation: 27 m (89 ft)

Population (2021)
  - Total: 1,815
  - Density: 223/km^{2} (577/sq mi)
- Time zone: UTC+1 (CET)
  - Summer (DST): UTC+2 (CEST)
- Postal code: 6099
- Dialing code: 0475
- Major roads: N273

Beegden (Dutch pronunciation: [ˈbeːɣdə(n)]; Limburgish: Bieëgdje [ˈbiəɣdʒə]) is a village in the Dutch province of Limburg. It is a part of the municipality of Maasgouw, and is located about 6 km west of Roermond.

Until 1991, Beegden was a separate municipality. During that year the village became part of the municipality of Heel en Panheel. In 2007 the municipality of Heel en Panheel, including Beegden, became part of the new municipality of Maasgouw. The town currently has about 1800 inhabitants. During the past few years tourism has developed in Beegden, the key attractions of the town are the church, the seventeenth-century house Huis Nederhoven and the St. Lindert windmill. The last underwent a major restoration in 2000 and can be visited free of charge every Wednesday and Saturday.

== Born in Beegden ==
- Annemiek Derckx (born 1954), Dutch canoer who twice won a bronze medal at the Summer Olympics

== Gallery ==
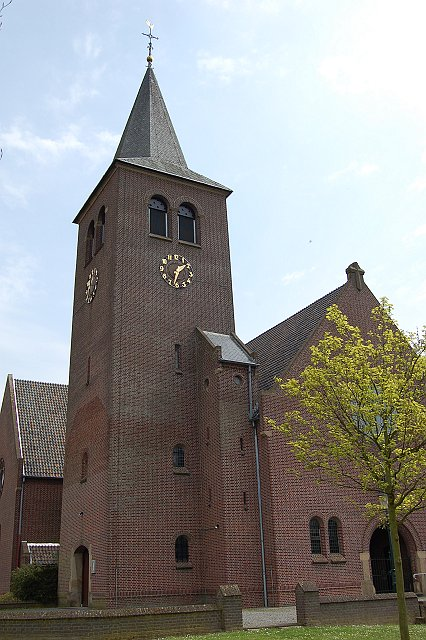
The Church of Beegden

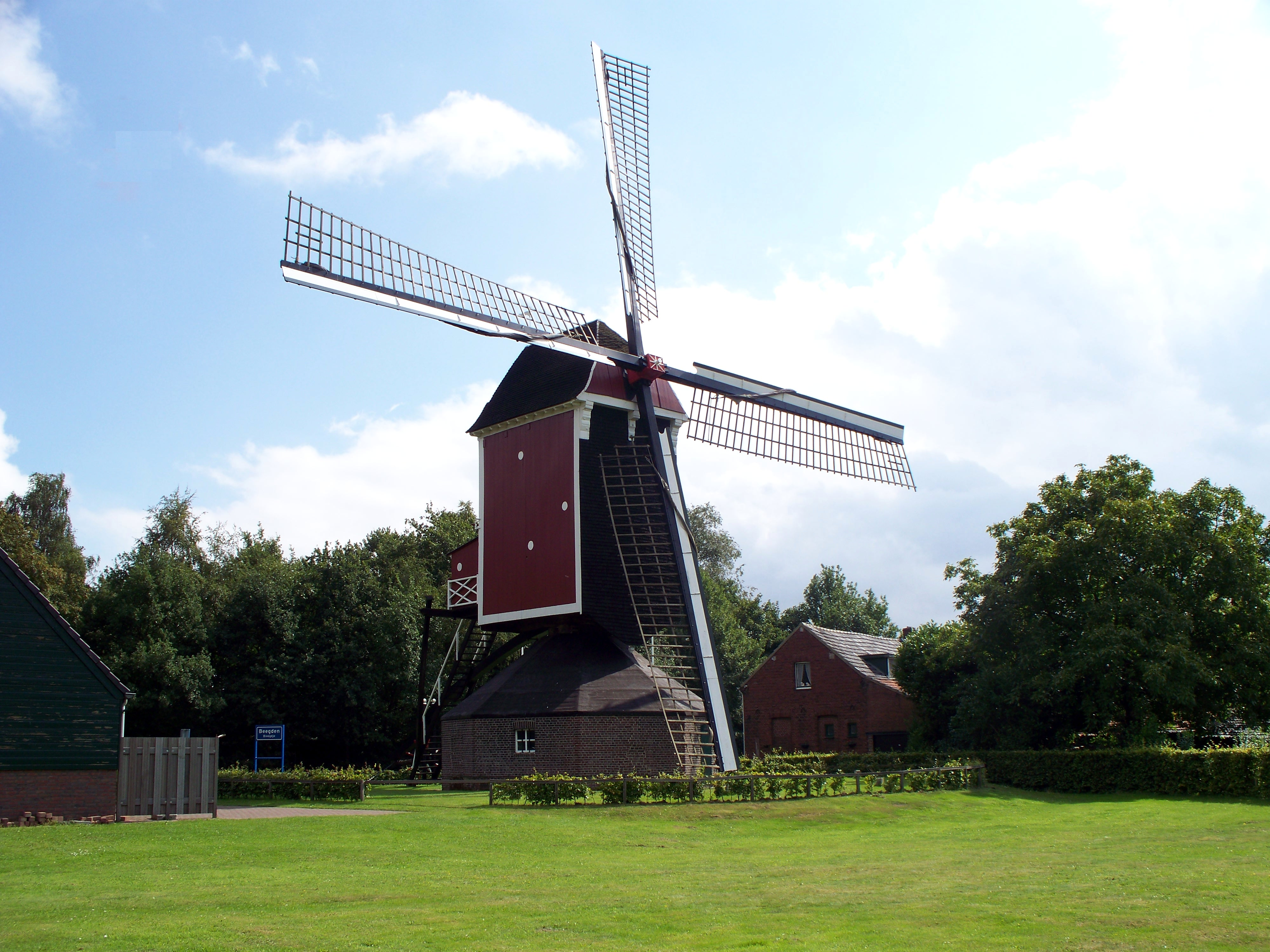
Windmill St Lindert

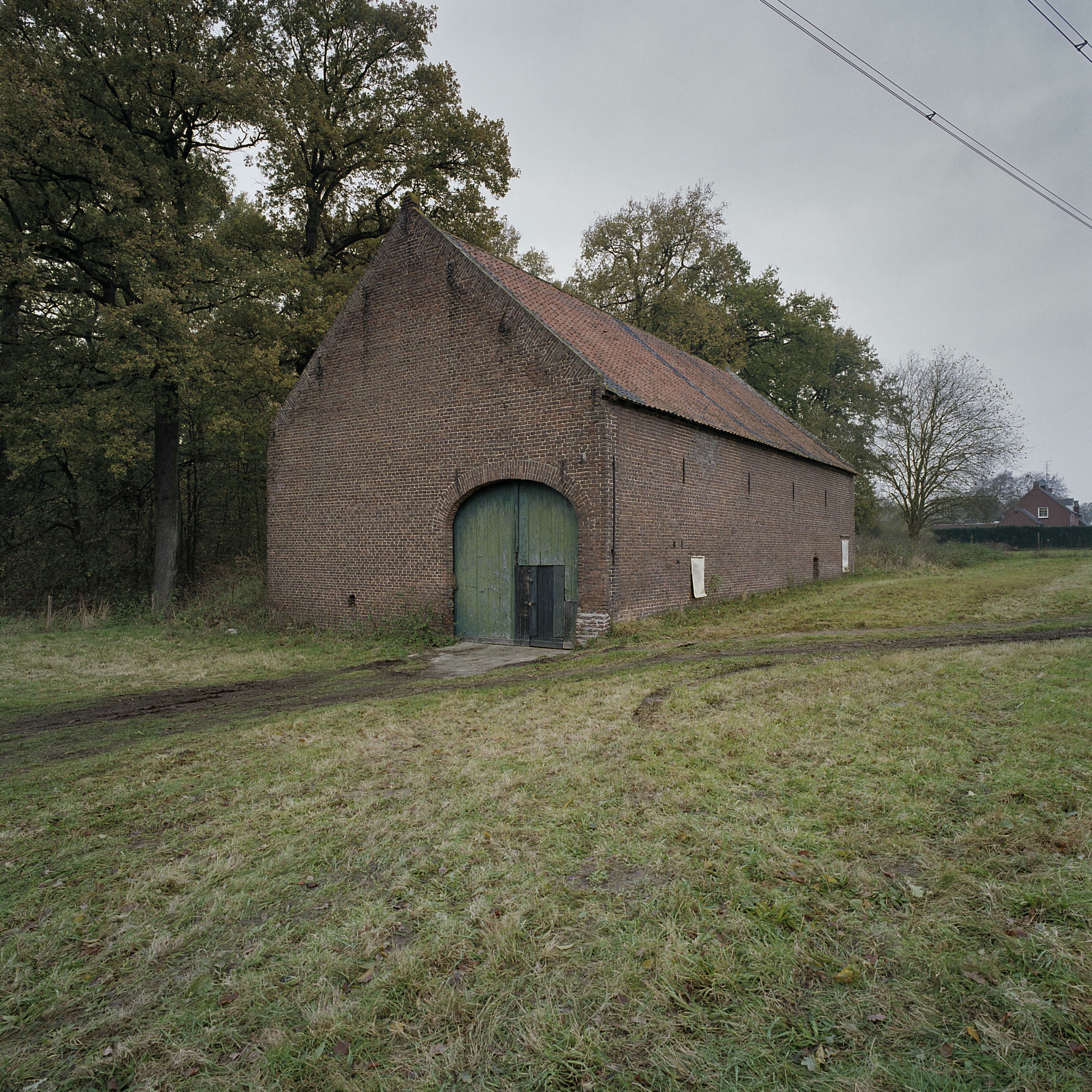
Barn in Beegden

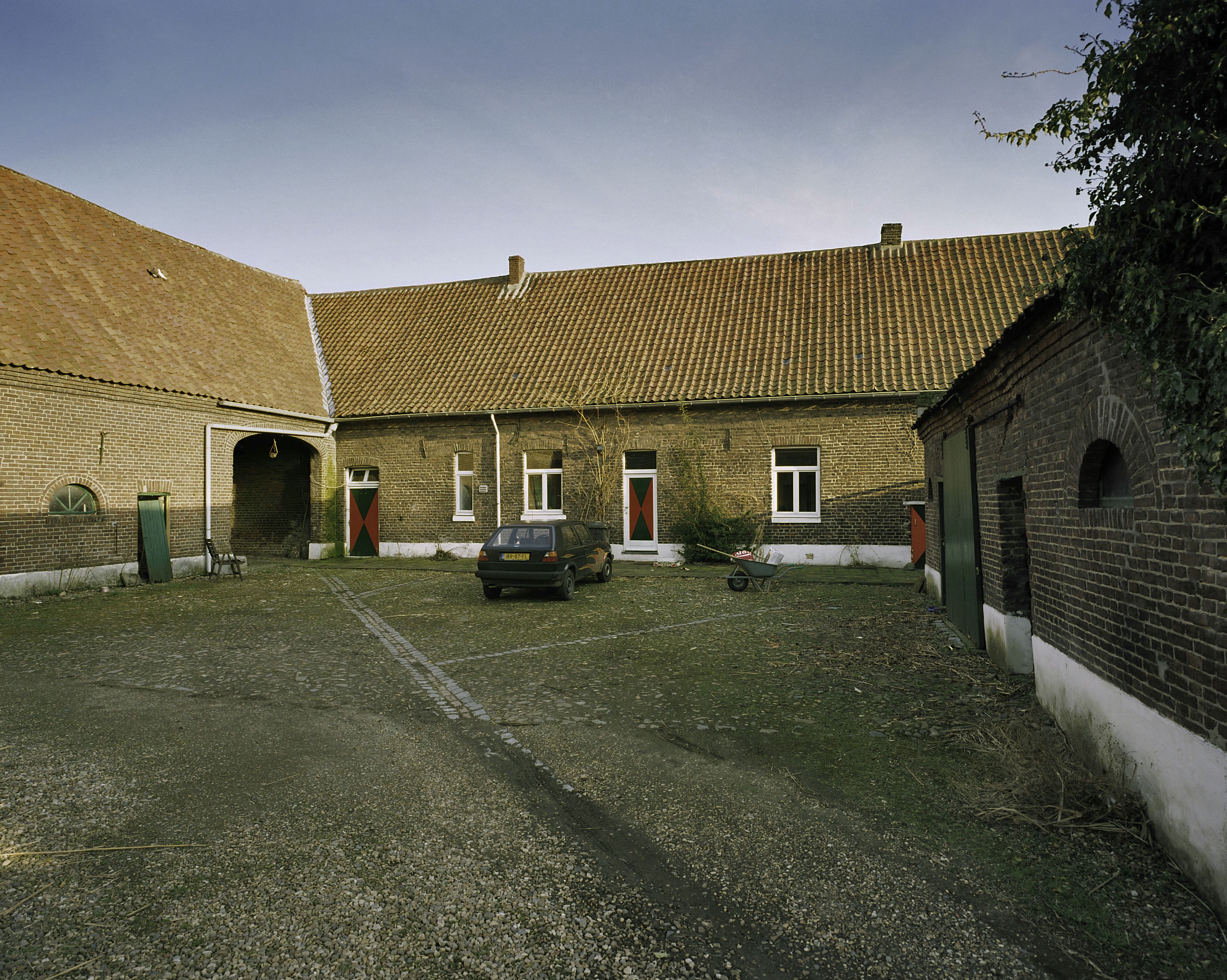
Court of a farm house
