= Ewa Wojtaszek =

Polish canoeist (born 1959)

Personal information
- Born: February 28, 1959 Tomaszów Mazowiecki
- Died: December 31, 2025 (aged 66)

Sport
- Sport: Sprint canoe
- Event: K-2 500 m

Ewa Wojtaszek (28 February 1959 – 31 December 2025) was a Polish sprint canoeist who competed in the early 1980s. At the 1980 Summer Olympics in Moscow, she finished seventh in the K-2 500 m event. Born in Tomaszów Mazowiecki.
