= Judith Skolnik =

West German sprint canoer (born 1966)

Judith Skolnik (born 24 January 1966) is a West German canoe sprinter who competed in the mid-1980s. At the 1984 Summer Olympics in Los Angeles, she finished fifth in the K-4 500 m event.
