= Ineke Bakker =

Dutch sprint canoer (born 1956)

Ineke Bakker (born 25 January 1956, in Amsterdam) is a Dutch sprint canoer who competed in the early 1980s. At the 1980 Summer Olympics in Moscow, she was eliminated in the semifinals of the K-2 500 m event while withdrawing from the heats of the K-1 500 m event.
