= Valérie Leclerc =

French canoeist (born 1961)

Valérie Leclerc (born 1 July 1961) is a French sprint canoeist who competed in the early 1980s. At the 1980 Summer Olympics in Moscow, she finished sixth in the K-2 500 m event.
