= Anne Wahl =

Norwegian canoeist (born 1953)

Personal information
- Nationality: Norwegian
- Born: August 25, 1953 (age 73) Norway

Sport
- Sport: Canoe sprint
- Events: K-2 500 m; K-4 500 m

Achievements and titles
- Olympic finals: 1984 Summer Olympics

Anne Wahl (born August 25, 1953) is a Norwegian sprint canoer who competed in the mid-1980s. At the 1984 Summer Olympics in Los Angeles, she finished sixth in the K-4 500 m event and seventh in the K-2 500 m event.
