= Marijke Kegge =

Dutch canoeist

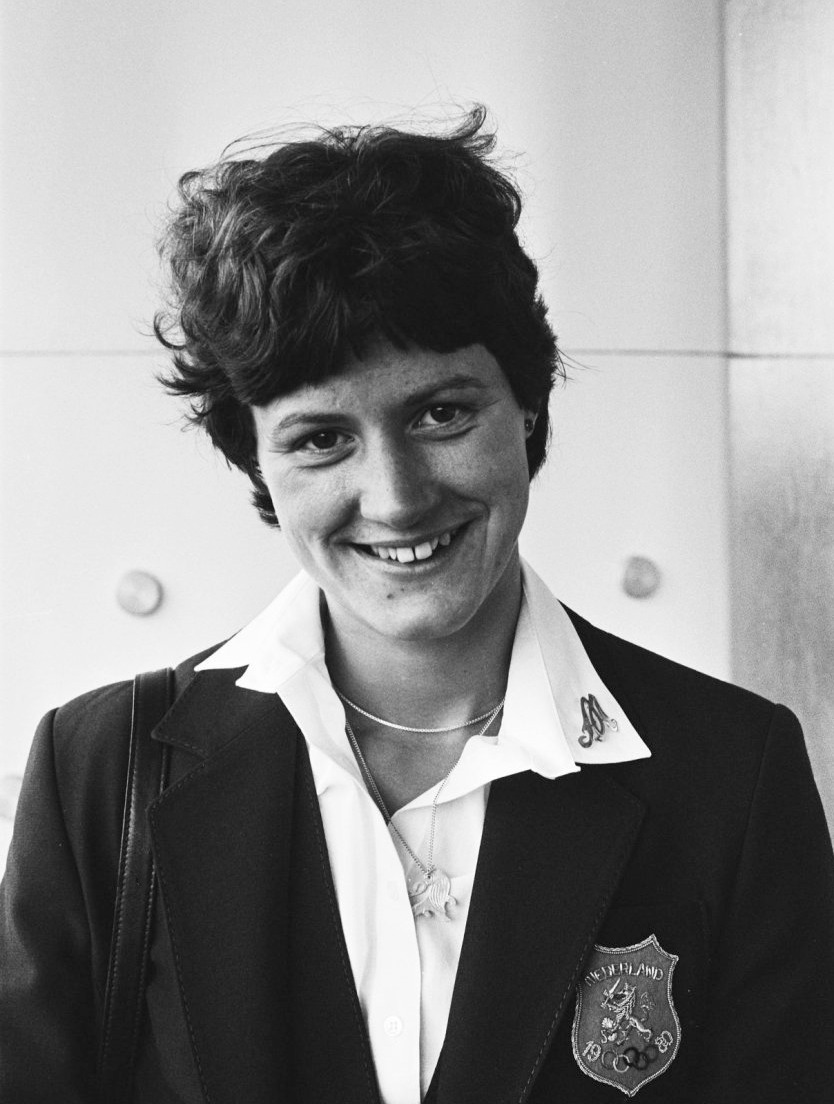
- Marijke Kegge in 1980

Personal information
- Born: 26 July 1957 (age 69) The Hague, the Netherlands
- Height: 1.65 m (5 ft 5 in)
- Weight: 59 kg (130 lb)

Sport
- Sport: Canoe racing
- Club: De Windhappers, Den Haag

Maria "Marijke" Kegge-Deege (born 26 July 1957) is a Dutch canoe sprinter who competed in the early 1980s. At the 1980 Summer Olympics in Moscow, she was eliminated in the semifinals of the K-2 500 m event.
