= Cathérine Mathevon =

French canoeist (born 1963)

Cathérine Mathevon (born 22 August 1963) is a French sprint canoeist who competed in the mid-1980s. She finished sixth in the K-2 500 m event at the 1984 Summer Olympics in Los Angeles.
