= Deborah Watson =

British canoeist

Personal information
- Nationality: British
- Born: 30 May 1964 (age 62)

Sport
- Sport: Canoe sprint

Deborah Watson (born 30 May 1964) is a British sprint canoeist who competed in the mid-1980s. She finished seventh in the K-4 500 m event at the 1984 Summer Olympics in Los Angeles.
