= Sue Whitebrook =

Australian sprint canoeist (born 1960)

Sue Whitebrook (born 2 February 1960) is an Australian sprint canoeist who competed in the mid-1970s. She participated in the 1976 Summer Olympics in Montreal, where she was eliminated in the repechages of the K-2 500 m event.
