= Natascha Janakieva =

Bulgarian canoeist

Medal record

Women's canoe sprint

Representing Bulgaria

World Championships
Gold medal – first place	1977 Sofia	K-4 500 m
Silver medal – second place	1978 Belgrade	K-4 500 m

Natascha Janakieva Petrova (alternate listings: Natasha Petrova, Natasha Yanakieva, Bulgarian: Наташа Петрова, born 19 March 1951) is a Bulgarian sprint canoer who competed from the early 1970s to the early 1980s. She won two medals in the K-4 500 m event at the ICF Canoe Sprint World Championships with a gold in 1977 and a silver in 1978.

Petrova also competed in three Summer Olympics, earning her best finish of seventh in the K-2 500 m event at Montreal in 1976.
