= Anne-Marie Loriot =

French canoeist

Anne-Marie Loriot (born 12 August 1956) is a French sprint canoeist who competed in the late 1970s and early 1980s. Competing in two Summer Olympics, she earned her best finish of sixth in the K-2 500 m event at Moscow in 1980.
