= Arne Sletsjøe =

Norwegian mathematician and canoe sprinter

Medal record

Men's canoe sprint

World Championships
Silver medal – second place	1983 Tampere	K-4 10000 m
Gold medal – first place	1987 Duisburg	K-4 10000 m

Arne Bernhard Sletsjøe (sometimes shown as Arne Slettsjø, born 8 April 1960) is a Norwegian mathematician and retired canoe sprinter who competed internationally in the mid to late 1980s.

== Career ==
He won two medals in the K-4 10000 m event at the ICF Canoe Sprint World Championships with a gold in 1987 and a silver in 1983. Sletsjøe also competed in two Summer Olympics in the K-4 1000 m event. At the 1984 Summer Olympics in Los Angeles, he was eliminated in the semifinals. Four years later in Seoul, Sletsjøe and his teammates made the semifinals, but did not finish. Sletsjøe later served as president of the Norwegian Canoe/ Kayak Federation.

He finished his secondary education at Oslo Cathedral School in 1977, graduated from the University of Oslo with the cand.real. degree in 1983 and took the doctorate in 1989. His academic advisor was Arnfinn Laudal. Sletsjøe still works at the university as an associate professor, having started out as a research fellow.

== Personal life ==
He is a son of violist Arne Sletsjøe. He is married to Ingeborg Rasmussen, has two children and resides at Jar. His daughter, Anna Margrete Sletsjøe, is an Olympic canoeist.
