= Hilary Peacock =

British canoeist

Hilary Jean Peacock MBE (born 8 February 1951) is a British canoe sprinter who competed in the mid-1970s. She was eliminated in the semifinals of K-2 500 m event at the 1976 Summer Olympics in Montreal. She was appointed MBE in the 1978 Birthday Honours.
