= Susanne Gunnarsson =

Swedish canoeist (born 1963)

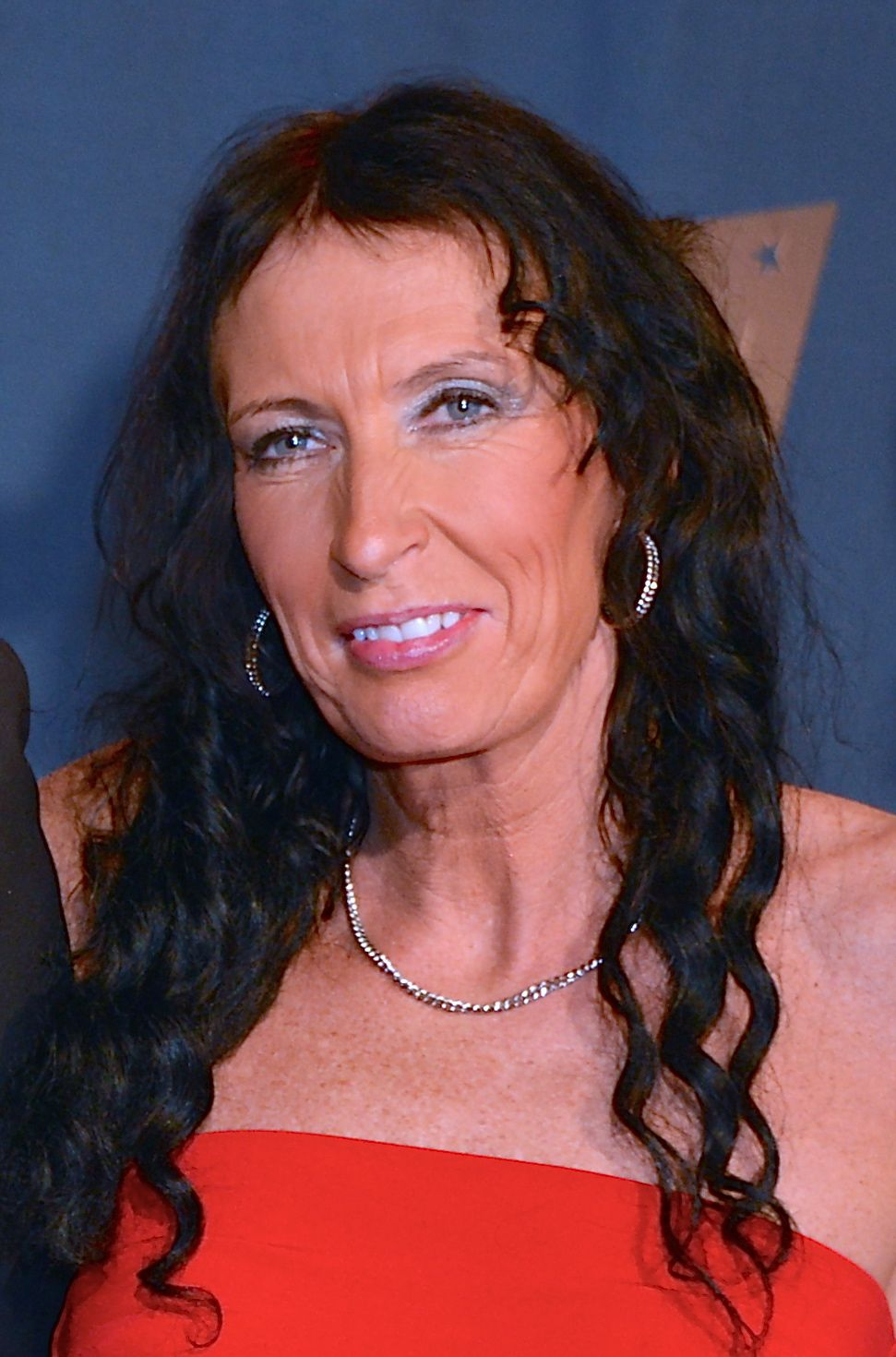
Medal record
Women's canoe sprint
Representing Sweden
Olympic Games
Gold medal – first place	1996 Atlanta	K-2 500 m
Silver medal – second place	1984 Los Angeles	K-4 500 m
Silver medal – second place	1992 Barcelona	K-2 500 m
World Championships
Gold medal – first place	1993 Copenhagen	K-1 5000 m
Silver medal – second place	1981 Nottingham	K-2 500 m
Silver medal – second place	1995 Duisburg	K-2 200 m
Silver medal – second place	1998 Szeged	K-4 200 m
Bronze medal – third place	1981 Nottingham	K-4 500 m
Bronze medal – third place	1983 Tampere	K-2 500 m
Bronze medal – third place	1995 Duisburg	K-1 500 m
Bronze medal – third place	1995 Duisburg	K-2 500 m
Bronze medal – third place	1998 Szeged	K-2 1000 m

Susanne Gunnarsson (née Wiberg; born 8 September 1963) is a Swedish sprint canoer and marathon canoeist who competed from the early 1980s to the late 1990s. Competing in four Summer Olympics, she won three medals with one gold (1996: K-2 500 m) and two silvers (1984: K-4 500 m, 1992: K-2 500 m).

Gunnarsson also won nine medals at the ICF Canoe Sprint World Championships with a gold (K-1 5000 m: 1993), three silvers (K-2 200 m: 1995, K-2 500 m: 1981, K-4 200 m: 1998), and five bronzes (K-1 500 m: 1995, K-2 500 m: 1983, 1995; K-2 1000 m: 1998, K-4 500 m: 1981).

She was awarded the Svenska Dagbladet Gold Medal in 1996, jointly with Agneta Andersson.

Awards
Preceded by Annika Sörenstam	Svenska Dagbladet Gold Medal with Agneta Andersson; 1996	Succeeded by Ludmila Engquist
