= Lucie Guay =

Canadian canoeist (born 1958)

Olympic medal record

Women's canoe sprint
Bronze medal – third place	1984 Los Angeles	K-4 500 m

Lucie Guay (born December 12, 1958) is a Canadian sprint kayaker who competed in the early 1980s. She was born in Montreal and won a bronze medal in the K-4 500 m event at the 1984 Summer Olympics in Los Angeles.
