= Maria Mintscheva =

Bulgarian canoeist

Medal record

Women's canoe sprint

World Championships
Gold medal – first place	1977 Sofia	K-4 500 m
Silver medal – second place	1978 Belgrade	K-4 500 m

Maria Mintscheva (sometimes listed as Mariya Mincheva) (Bulgarian: Мария Минчева), born 7 February 1952) is a Bulgarian sprint canoer who competed in the late 1970s and early 1980s. She won two medals in the K-4 500 m event at the ICF Canoe Sprint World Championships with a gold in 1977 and a silver in 1978.

Mintscheva also competed in two Summer Olympics, earning her best finish of seventh in the K-2 500 m event at Montreal in 1976.
