= Gábor Kőhalmi =

Hungarian footballer

Personal information
- Date of birth: 31 October 1955 (age 71)
- Place of birth: Szombathely, Hungary
- Position: Defender

Youth career
- 1971–1972: Szombathelyi Haladás

Senior career*
Years	Team	Apps	(Gls)
1972–1973	Haladás		
1973–1978	Budapest Honvéd FC	17	(0)
1977–1978	->Csepel SC	32	(5)
1978–1984	Csepel SC	144	(3)

International career
1983	Hungary	2	(0)
- * Club domestic league appearances and goals

Gábor Kőhalmi (31 October 1955) is a former Hungarian professional footballer who played as defender. He was a member of the Hungary national team.

== Career ==
In October 1972, he made his debut for Haladás. In the summer of 1973, he was transferred from Haladás to Budapest Honvéd FC. In 1977, he was loaned to Csepel SC for a year. At the end of the season, he returned to Honvéd, and from mid-November 1978 he was a Csepel player for good. He played for Csepel until 1984. Between 1980 and 1984 he played 123 league games for Csepel and scored three goals. In 1984 he was banned for several years for bribery.

=== National team ===
He played 2 times for the Hungary national team in 1983.

== Honours ==
- Nemzeti Bajnokság I (NB I)
  - Second: 1974-75
