= Béatrice Knopf-Basson =

French canoeist (born 1958)

Béatrice Knopf-Basson (born 29 June 1958 in Mulhouse) is a French sprint canoer who competed in the 1980s. Competing in three Summer Olympics, she earned her best finish of fifth in the K-1 500 m event at Los Angeles in 1984.
