= Ann Turner (canoeist) =

American sprint canoer (born 1956)

Ann Turner (born December 18, 1956) is an American sprint canoer who competed from the mid-1970s to the mid-1980s. Competing in two Summer Olympics, she earned her best finish of fourth in the K-4 500 metres event at Los Angeles in 1984. She retired from the sport in 1985.

Her brother is fellow sprint canoer Brent Turner.
