= Arne Sletsjøe (violist) =

Norwegian violist

Arne Sletsjøe (12 January 1916 – 1999) was a Norwegian violist.

He was born in Larvik. He was the father of canoer and mathematician Arne B. Sletsjøe.

He studied at Oslo Music Conservatory, the forerunner of the Norwegian Academy of Music. From 1945 onwards, he was violist, later solo violist of the Oslo Philharmonic. He played in the orchestra until 1981, when he retired after 36 years of service. Sletsjøe was a member of the ensembles Johnsrudkvartetten (1948–1953) and Den Norske Strykekvartett (1954–1965). In the former, the concert leader Henry Johnsrud was the leader, while Kåre Fuglesang led Den Norske Strykekvartett. In this quartet, he played alongside the violinist Aage Wallin and cellist Arne Novang.

After his retirement at age 65, he was a freelancer for the Norwegian National Opera for five years.
