= Elisabeta Băbeanu =

Romanian canoeist (born 1962)

Elisabeta Băbeanu (born 10 April 1962) is a Romanian sprint canoer who competed in the early 1980s. At the 1980 Summer Olympics in Moscow, she finished fourth in the K-2 500 m event.
