= Anna Margrete Sletsjøe =

Norwegian canoeist (born 1997)

Personal information
- Born: 22 December 1997 (age 28)

Sport
- Country: Norwegian
- Sport: Canoe sprint Canoe marathon
- Events: K-1 5000 m, K-2 500, K-4 500
Medal record
Representing Norway
Women's canoe sprint
World Championships
Bronze medal – third place	2025 Milan	K-1 5000 m
European Championships
Bronze medal – third place	2024 Szeged	K-4 500 m
Women's canoe marathon
World Championships
Bronze medal – third place	2025 Győr	K-1
European Championships
Gold medal – first place	2025 Ponte de Lima	K-1
Silver medal – second place	2025 Ponte de Lima	K-1 short race

Anna Margrete Sletsjøe (born 22 December 1997) is a Norwegian canoeist. She represented Norway at the 2024 Summer Olympics.

== Career ==
In August 2024, Sletsjøe represented Norway at the 2024 Summer Olympics in the K-4 500 metres and finished in seventh place with a time of 1:35.02.

In June 2025, she competed at the 2025 Canoe Marathon European Championships and won a gold medal in the K-1 and a silver medal in the K-1 short race. In August 2025, she competed at the 2025 ICF Canoe Sprint World Championships and won a bronze medal in the K-1 5000 metres with a time of 23:10.86. This was Norways's first medal at the 2025 Sprint World Championships. The next month she competed at the 2025 ICF Canoe Marathon World Championships and won a bronze medal in the K-1 event with a time of 1:58:41.00. She also competed in the K-1 short race and finished in fifth place.

== Personal life ==
Sletsjøe is the daughter of Arne Sletsjøe and Ingeborg Rasmussen, who are both former canoeists.
