= Pernille Knudsen =

Danish canoeist (born 1997)

Personal information
- Full name: Pernille Brandstrup Knudsen
- Nationality: Danish
- Born: 31 July 1997 (age 29)

Sport
- Country: Denmark
- Sport: Sprint kayak
- Club: Maribo Kayakclub
Medal record
World Championships
Bronze medal – third place	2021 Copenhagen	K-1 1000 m
Bronze medal – third place	2026 Poznań	K-1 1000 m
European Championships
Silver medal – second place	2022 Munich	K-4 500 m

Pernille Brandstrup Knudsen (born 31 July 1997) is a Danish sprint canoeist.

She competed at the 2021 ICF Canoe Sprint World Championships, winning a bronze medal in the K-1 1000 m distance.
