= Lucy Perrett =

British canoeist

Lucy Perrett (born 4 November 1960) is a British canoe sprinter who competed in the early to mid-1980s. Competing in two Summer Olympics, she earned her best finish of seventh in the K-4 500 m event at Los Angeles in 1984.
