= Emese Kőhalmi =

Hungarian canoeist

Personal information
- Nationality: Hungarian
- Born: 31 May 2002 (age 24)

Sport
- Country: Hungary
- Sport: Sprint kayak
Medal record
Women's canoe sprint
World Championships
Gold medal – first place	2021 Copenhagen	K-1 5000 m
Gold medal – first place	2022 Dartmouth	K-1 5000 m
Gold medal – first place	2024 Samarkand	K-1 1000 m
Gold medal – first place	2024 Samarkand	K-1 5000 m
Silver medal – second place	2024 Samarkand	K-4 Mix 500 m
Silver medal – second place	2026 Poznań	K-1 5000 m
European Championships
Gold medal – first place	2022 Munich	K-2 1000 m
Gold medal – first place	2022 Munich	K-1 5000 m
Gold medal – first place	2024 Szeged	K-1 5000 m
Gold medal – first place	2025 Racice	K-4 500 m
Gold medal – first place	2026 Montemor O Velho	K-1 1000 m
Gold medal – first place	2026 Montemor O Velho	K-1 5000 m
Women's canoe marathon
World Championships
Gold medal – first place	2023 Vejen	K-2
Silver medal – second place	2024 Metković	K-1 short race
Bronze medal – third place	2024 Metković	K-1

Emese Kőhalmi (born 31 May 2002) is a Hungarian sprint canoeist.

== Career ==
She competed at the 2021 ICF Canoe Sprint World Championships, winning a gold medal in the K-1 5000 m distance.

== Major results ==
=== World championships ===
Year	K-1 1000	K-1 5000	K-4 500	XK-4 500
2021		1st place, gold medalist(s)		—N/a
2022		1st place, gold medalist(s)	6	—N/a
2024	1st place, gold medalist(s)	1st place, gold medalist(s)	—N/a	2nd place, silver medalist(s)
