= Heiderose Wallbaum =

West German canoe sprinter (born 1951)

Medal record

Women's canoe sprint

World Championships
Silver medal – second place	1971 Belgrade	K-4 500 m

Adelheid "Heiderose" Wallbaum-Höfle (born 24 February 1951) is a West German canoe sprinter who competed in the early to mid-1970s. She won a silver medal in the K-4 500 m event at the 1971 ICF Canoe Sprint World Championships in Belgrade.

Wallbaum also finished fifth in the K-2 500 m event at the 1976 Summer Olympics in Montreal.
