= Barbara Schüttpelz =

Olympic medal record

Women's canoe sprint
Silver medal – second place	1984 Los Angeles	K-1 500 m
Bronze medal – third place	1984 Los Angeles	K-2 500 m

Barbara Lewe-Pohlmann-Schüttpelz (born 9 September 1956 in Emsdetten, North Rhine-Westphalia) is a West German canoe sprinter who won competed from the late 1970s to the early 1980s. Competing in two Summer Olympics, she won two medals at Los Angeles in 1984 with a silver in the K-1 500 m and a bronze in the K-2 500 m events.
