= Lesley Smither =

British sprint canoer (born 1958)

Lesley Smither (born 12 March 1958) is a British canoe sprinter who competed in the early to mid-1980s. Competing in two Summer Olympics, she earned her best finish of seventh in the K-4 500 m event at Los Angeles in 1984.
