= Agneta Andersson =

Swedish sprint canoer (1961–2023)

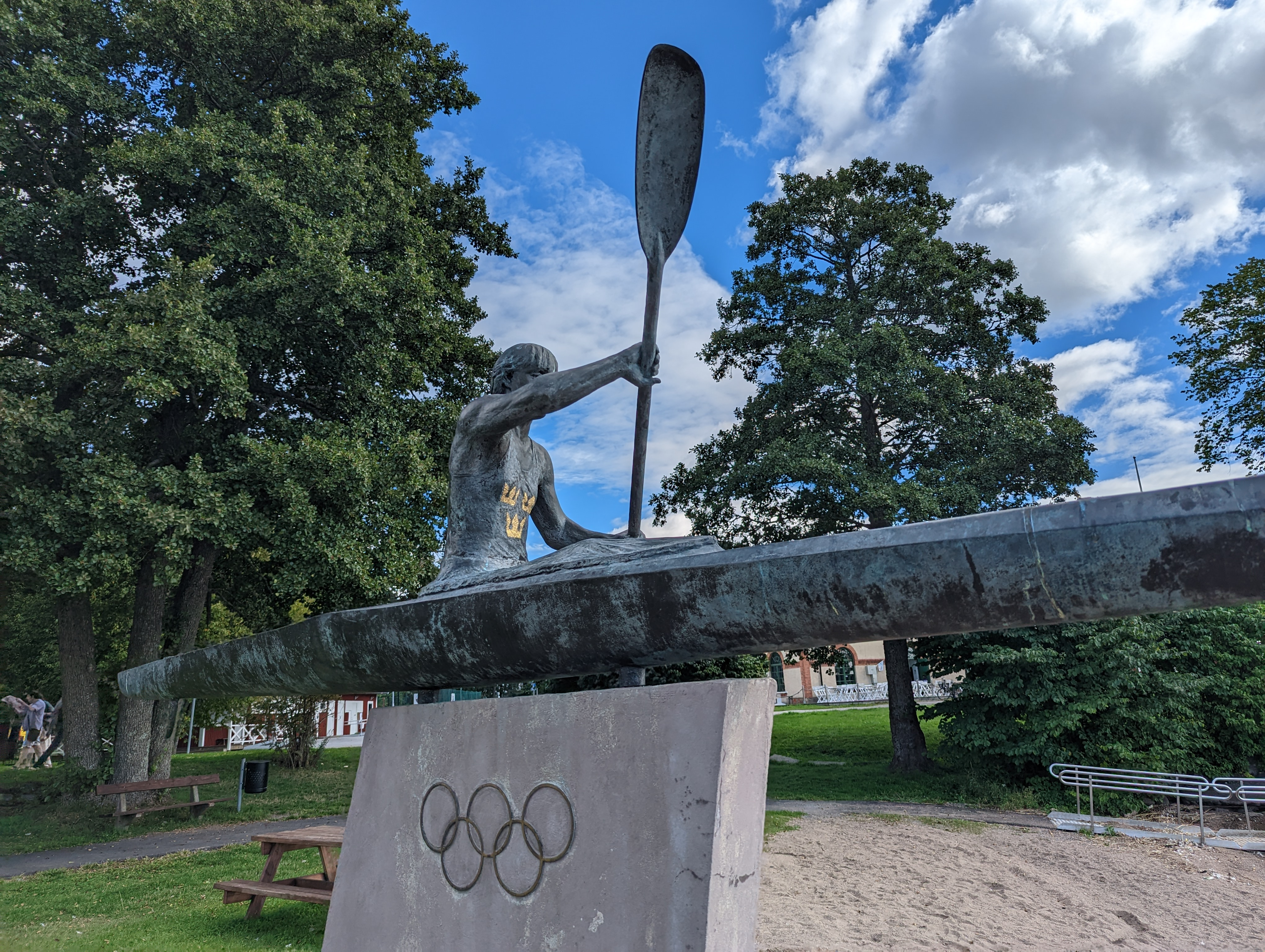

Personal information
- Born: 25 April 1961 Karlskoga, Sweden
- Died: 8 October 2023 (aged 62) Karlskoga, Sweden
- Resting place: Skogskyrkogården
Medal record
Women's canoe sprint
Olympic Games
Gold medal – first place	1984 Los Angeles	K-1 500 m
Gold medal – first place	1984 Los Angeles	K-2 500 m
Gold medal – first place	1996 Atlanta	K-2 500 m
Silver medal – second place	1984 Los Angeles	K-4 500 m
Silver medal – second place	1992 Barcelona	K-2 500 m
Bronze medal – third place	1992 Barcelona	K-4 500 m
Bronze medal – third place	1996 Atlanta	K-4 500 m
World Championships
Gold medal – first place	1993 Copenhagen	K-2 500 m
Silver medal – second place	1981 Nottingham	K-2 500 m
Silver medal – second place	1982 Belgrade	K-1 500 m
Silver medal – second place	1993 Copenhagen	K-4 500 m
Bronze medal – third place	1981 Nottingham	K-1 500 m
Bronze medal – third place	1981 Nottingham	K-4 500 m
Bronze medal – third place	1982 Belgrade	K-2 500 m
Bronze medal – third place	1983 Tampere	K-2 500 m
Bronze medal – third place	1985 Mechelen	K-1 500 m
Bronze medal – third place	1987 Duisburg	K-1 500 m
Bronze medal – third place	1991 Paris	K-2 500 m

Agneta Monica Andersson (25 April 1961 – 8 October 2023) was a Swedish sprint canoer who competed from the early 1980s to the late 1990s. Competing in five Summer Olympics, she won seven medals with three gold (K-1 500 m: 1984, K-2 500 m: 1984, 1996), two silvers (K-4 500 m: 1984, K-2 500 m: 1992), and two bronzes (K-4 500 m: 1992, 1996).

Andersson was awarded the Svenska Dagbladet Gold Medal in 1996, jointly with Susanne Gunnarsson. She also won eleven medals at the ICF Canoe Sprint World Championships with a gold (K-2 500 m: 1993), three silvers (K-1 500 m: 1982, K-2 500 m: 1981, K-4 500 m: 1993), and seven bronzes (K-1 500 m: 1981, 1985, 1987; K-2 500 m: 1982, 1983, 1985, 1991).

Andersson died of cancer on 8 October 2023, at the age of 62.

Awards
Preceded by Annika Sörenstam	Svenska Dagbladet Gold Medal with Susanne Gunnarsson; 1996	Succeeded by Ludmila Engquist
Olympic Games
Preceded by Hans Svensson	Flagbearer for Sweden; Seoul 1988	Succeeded by Stefan Edberg
