= Marleen Kuppens =

Belgian canoeist (born 1959)

Marleen Kuppens (born 30 April 1959, in Neerpelt) is a Belgian canoe sprinter who competed from the mid-1970s to the mid-1980s. Competing in three Summer Olympics, she earned her best finish of ninth in the K-2 500 m event at Los Angeles in 1984.
