= Saman Soltani =

Iranian canoe sprinter

Personal information
- Native name: سمن سلطانی
- Born: 11 June 1996 (age 30)

Sport
- Sport: Canoe sprint

Saman Soltani (Persian: سمن سلطانی; born 11 June 1996) is an Iranian canoe sprinter based in Austria.

== Life ==
Soltani began swimming at age six. She was competing in the sport by age eight, and later competed in artistic swimming. Although the sport was not well-supported in Iran, Soltani went on to become the country's national champion, a title which she held for a decade. However, she was not allowed to compete internationally by authorities.

Soltani was introduced to kayaking as a teenager, and switched to the sport as it was more accessible for women in Iran. Within two years, she was a member of Iran's national team. In 2018, Soltani and her team won silver at the Asian Under-23 championships. Although she wanted to compete in the 2020 Olympics, COVID-19 and lack of funding prevented her.

In 2022, Soltani was invited to attend an artistic swimming camp in Barcelona. While there, she learned that Iranian morality police planned to arrest her when she returned home because she had posted photos on Instagram without wearing a hijab. She flew to Vienna, where her only European friend was living. She was granted asylum in Austria, where she has since trained with the Austrian Canoe Federation.

She competed in canoe sprint at the 2024 Summer Olympics in Paris as part of the Refugee Olympic Team. She reached the quarter-finals for the women's K1 500 event.

In 2025, Soltani competed in the ICF Canoe Sprint World Cup.

== Personal life ==
Soltani was raised in Tehran. She has a degree in accounting.
