= Canoeing at the 1972 Summer Olympics – Women's K-2 500 metres =

The women's K-2 500 metres event was a pairs kayaking event conducted as part of the Canoeing at the 1972 Summer Olympics program.

== Medalists ==
Gold	Silver	Bronze
Lyudmila Pinayeva and Yekaterina Kuryshko (URS)	Ilse Kaschube and Petra Grabowski (GDR)	Maria Nichiforov and Viorica Dumitru (ROU)

== Results ==
=== Heats ===
The 12 crews first raced in two heats on September 5. The top three finishers from each of the heats advanced directly to the final; the remaining six teams were relegated to the semifinal.

Heat 1
1.	Lyudmila Pinayeva and Yekaterina Kuryshko (URS)	2:00.31	QF
2.	Ilse Kaschube and Petra Grabowski (GDR)	2:00.96	QF
3.	Anna Pfeffer and Katalin Hollósy (HUN)	2:01.87	QF
4.	Izabella Antonowicz and Ewa Grajkowska (POL)	2:04.30	QS
5.	Natasha Petrova and Petrana Koleva (BUL)	2:05.16	QS
6.	Majorie Horner-Dixon and Claudia Hunt (CAN)	2:11.24	QS
Heat 2
1.	Maria Nichiforov and Viorica Dumitru (ROU)	1:59.59	QF
2.	Roswitha Esser and Renate Breuer (FRG)	2:00.32	QF
3.	Mieke Jaapies and Maria van der Holst-Blijlevens (NED)	2:03.33	QF
4.	Anastászie Fridrichová and Oldřiška Kaplanová (TCH)	2:06.73	QS
5.	Helen Woodhouse and Pamela Renshaw (GBR)	2:10.22	QS
6.	Nancy Purves and Linda Murray (USA)	2:11.50	QS

=== Semifinal ===
The top three finishers in the semifinal (raced on September 8) advanced to the final.

Semifinal
1.	Izabella Antonowicz and Ewa Grajkowska (POL)	1:55.50	QF
2.	Natasha Petrova and Petrana Koleva (BUL)	1:57.31	QF
3.	Anastászie Fridrichová and Oldřiška Kaplanová (TCH)	1:58.25	QF
4.	Nancy Purves and Linda Murray (USA)	2:01.27
5.	Majorie Horner-Dixon and Claudia Hunt (CAN)	2:03.60
6.	Helen Woodhouse and Pamela Renshaw (GBR)	2:04.44

=== Final ===
The final was held on September 9.

Gold	Lyudmila Pinayeva and Yekaterina Kuryshko (URS)	1:53.50
Silver	Ilse Kaschube and Petra Grabowski (GDR)	1:54.30
Bronze	Maria Nichiforov and Viorica Dumitru (ROU)	1:55.01
4.	Anna Pfeffer and Katalin Hollósy (HUN)	1:55.12
5.	Roswitha Esser and Renate Breuer (FRG)	1:55.64
6.	Izabella Antonowicz and Ewa Grajkowska (POL)	1:57.45
7.	Mieke Jaapies and Maria van der Holst-Blijlevens (NED)	1:58.11
8.	Natasha Petrova and Petrana Koleva (BUL)	1:59.40
9.	Anastászie Fridrichová and Oldřiška Kaplanová (TCH)	1:59.84
