= Canoeing at the 1976 Summer Olympics – Women's K-1 500 metres =

The women's K-1 500 metres event was an individual kayaking event conducted as part of the Canoeing at the 1976 Summer Olympics program.

== Medalists ==
Gold	Silver	Bronze
Carola Zirzow (GDR)	Tatiana Korshunova (URS)	Klára Rajnai (HUN)

== Results ==
=== Heats ===
The 15 competitors first raced in two heats on July 28. The top three finishers from each of the heats advanced directly to the semifinals while the rest competed in the repechages.

Heat 1
1.	Ewa Kamińska (POL)	2:12.38	QS
2.	Carola Zirzow (GDR)	2:12.54	QS
3.	Klára Rajnai (HUN)	2:14.90	QS
4.	Maria Mihoreanu (ROU)	2:15.00	QR
5.	Anastázie Hajná (TCH)	2:16.43	QR
6.	Brigitte Vernaillen (BEL)	2:21.21	QR
7.	Marita Skogh (SWE)	2:22.14	QR
8.	Françoise Bonetat (FRA)	2:22.38	QR
Heat 2
1.	Tatiana Korshunova (URS)	2:11.58	QS
2.	Julie Leach (USA)	2:13.00	QS
3.	Irene Pepinghege (FRG)	2:13.90	QS
4.	Rosa Georgieva (BUL)	2:14.23	QR
5.	Sheila Burnett (GBR)	2:17.07	QR
6.	Kate Olsen (DEN)	2:18.26	QR
7.	Susan Holloway (CAN)	2:18.86	QR

=== Repechages ===
Taking place on July 28, the top three finishers from each repechage advanced to the semifinals.

Repechage 1
1.	Maria Mihoreanu (ROU)	2:06.60	QS
2.	Sheila Burnett (GBR)	2:10.59	QS
3.	Susan Holloway (CAN)	2:11.39	QS
4.	Françoise Bonetat (FRA)	2:11.61
5.	Brigitte Vernaillen (BEL)	2:15.72
Repechage 2
1.	Anastázie Hajná (TCH)	2:10.22	QS
2.	Rosa Georgieva (BUL)	2:10.57	QS
3.	Kate Olsen (DEN)	2:13.10	QS
4.	Marita Skogh (SWE)	2:14.60

=== Semifinals ===
The top three finishers in each of the three semifinals (raced on July 30) advanced to the final.

Semifinal 1
1.	Ewa Kamińska (POL)	2:08.48	QF
2.	Anastázie Hajná (TCH)	2:10.31	QF
3.	Irene Pepinghege (FRG)	2:11.45	QF
4.	Susan Holloway (CAN)	2:13.23
Semifinal 2
1.	Tatiana Korshunova (URS)	2:07.90	QF
2.	Klára Rajnai (HUN)	2:09.39	QF
3.	Rosa Georgieva (BUL)	2:10.51	QF
4.	Sheila Burnett (GBR)	2:12.07
Semifinal 3
1.	Carola Zirzow (GDR)	2:04.21	QF
2.	Maria Mihoreanu (ROU)	2:05.72	QF
3.	Julie Leach (USA)	2:09.44	QF
4.	Kate Olsen (DEN)	2:12.71

=== Final ===
The final was held on July 30.

Gold	Carola Zirzow (GDR)	2:01.05
Silver	Tatiana Korshunova (URS)	2:03.07
Bronze	Klára Rajnai (HUN)	2:05.01
4.	Ewa Kamińska (POL)	2:05.16
5.	Maria Mihoreanu (ROU)	2:05.40
6.	Anastázie Hajná (TCH)	2:06.72
7.	Julie Leach (USA)	2:06.92
8.	Irene Pepinghege (FRG)	2:07.80
9.	Rosa Georgieva (BUL)	2:08.54
