= Canoeing at the 1968 Summer Olympics – Women's K-1 500 metres =

The women's K-1 500 metres event was an individual kayaking event conducted as part of the Canoeing at the 1968 Summer Olympics program. In the official report, heats were shown timed in tenths of a second (0.1) while the semifinal and final events were timed in hundredths of a second (0.01).

== Medalists ==
Gold	Silver	Bronze
Lyudmila Pinayeva (URS)	Renate Breuer (FRG)	Viorica Dumitru (ROU)

== Results ==
=== Heats ===
The 13 competitors first raced in two heats on October 22. The top three finishers from each of the heats advanced directly to the final while the rest competed in the semifinal two days later.

Heat 1
1.	Lyudmila Pinayeva (URS)	2:07.1	QF
2.	Anna Pfeffer (HUN)	2:08.6	QF
3.	Iva Vávrová (TCH)	2:09.1	QF
4.	Marcia Smoke (USA)	2:09.6	QS
5.	Stanisława Szydłowska (POL)	2:12.1	QS
6.	Sylvia Jackson (GBR)	2:13.6	QS
7.	Ann Margarit Henningsen (MEX)	2:18.2	QS
Heat 2
1.	Viorica Dumitru (ROU)	2:10.0	QF
2.	Renate Breuer (FRG)	2:10.3	QF
3.	Mieke Jaapies (NED)	2:10.9	QF
4.	Ingmårie Svensson (SWE)	2:12.2	QS
5.	Anita Nüssner (GDR)	2:17.0	QS
6.	Majorie Homer-Dixon (CAN)	2:18.5	QS

In the official report, Nüssner's surname is shown as Nübner and Svensson's first name is shown as Ing-Marie.

=== Semifinal ===
The top three finishers in the semifinal (raced on October 24) advanced to the final.

Semifinal
1.	Marcia Smoke (USA)	2:12.67	QF
2.	Anita Nüssner (GDR)	2:13.42	QF
3.	Ingmårie Svensson (SWE)	2:14.55	QF
4.	Stanisława Szydłowska (POL)	2:15.32
5.	Sylvia Jackson (GBR)	2:17.98
6.	Majorie Homer-Dixon (CAN)	2:20.84
7.	Ann Margarit Henningsen (MEX)	2:21.39

=== Final ===
The final was held on October 25.

Gold	Lyudmila Pinayeva (URS)	2:11.09
Silver	Renate Breuer (FRG)	2:12.71
Bronze	Viorica Dumitru (ROU)	2:13.22
4.	Marcia Smoke (USA)	2:14.68
5.	Iva Vávrová (TCH)	2:14.78
6.	Anita Nüssner (GDR)	2:16.02
7.	Ingmårie Svensson (SWE)	2:16.04
8.	Mieke Jaapies (NED)	2:18.38
-	Anna Pfeffer (HUN)	DNF

Pfeffer capsized in the water midway through the final and had to be rescued by watercraft following the canoers.
