= Brunon Synak =

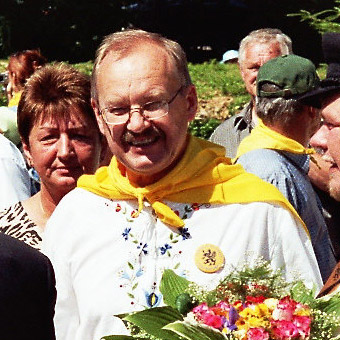
Prof. Brunon Synak in Łeba

Brunon Synak (23 October 1943 – 18 December 2013) was a Kashubian sociologist, politician and local government activist. He was Chairman of the Main Board of the Kashubian-Pomeranian Association.

== Life history ==
=== Childhood and education ===
Brunon Synak was born on 23 October 1943 in Podjazy in the Sulęczyno commune. His father, Ambroży Synak, was the director of a local mill, and his mother, Helena née Kotłowska, took care of the children and the household. Having finished his education at the primary school of Podjazy, in 1957 Brunon Synak was admitted to the Pedagogical High School in Kościerzyna, where he passed the Polish end-of-school examination (matura) in 1962. Then he undertook work as a teacher in the primary school of Borek Kamienny. In 1963, he continued his education in the Teacher's School of Physical Education in Gdańsk (which was later transformed into the Academy of Physical Education and Sport in Gdańsk). During his stay at the School, he began studying pedagogy at the Higher Pedagogical School in Gdańsk and was actively involved in the Scientific Sociological Circle of the Department of Sociology. Having obtained the vocational title of the Master, in 1969 he was employed as the factory's sociologist in the Radio Factory "Radmor" of Gdynia. After a year's work at the enterprise, he undertook PhD studies at the Institute of Sociology of the University of Warsaw. Under the supervision of professor Stefan Nowakowski, he wrote his doctoral dissertation focusing on the life and financial situation of the elderly in the country. In 1973, he defended his PhD dissertation.

=== Scientific work ===
Having obtained the doctoral degree, he was employed at the Department of Sociology of the University of Gdańsk, the Director of which was then professor Bolesław Maroszek. Synak many times stayed at the University in Turk which had signed a contract of cooperation with his University. In 1983, he participated in a trip of the members of the Scientific Sociological Circle to the University of Tromsø. Apart from that, he cooperated with and was a scientific intern of the University of Aberdeen, the University of Cambridge, and the Free University of Berlin. At the same time, in 1983, he obtained the degree of assistant professor. In 1989, as a result of a division of the Department of Sociology, he became the Director of the Department of General Sociology. He held this position for many years. On 27 December 1993, he obtained the degree of professor of humanities.

In the years 1988–1989, Brunon Synak presided over the Gdańsk branch of the Polish Sociological Society. In his scientific work, he focused mainly on concepts related to social gerontology, which touched upon, inter alia, the situation of the elderly in the countryside environments and the influences of the transformation processes. He researched the countryside environment in the Gdańsk Pomerania, where he focused mainly on the changes on the countryside areas under the influence of the processes of migration, urbanization, the situation of elderly farmers, generation conflicts, the social advancement of the youth. In 1986, he joined the research team (including Marek Latoszek and Olgierd Sochacki) conducting, for the first time as wide in range, field research in Kashubia under a draft title "Ethnicity as a structural factor of local communities" ("Etniczność jako czynnik strukturalny społeczności lokalnych"). The results led to publishing, in 1990, the sociological monograph "Kashubians" ("Kaszubi"). In 1991, Brunon Synak and other researchers were awarded the Stolem Medal for this monograph by "Pomorania" Student Organization. In 2012, his contribution in this area was appreciated again - he was awarded the Jan Heweliusz Scientific Prize of the City of Gdańsk (Nagroda Naukowa Miasta Gdańska im. Jana Heweliusza).

Brunon Synak held also administrative positions at the University of Gdańsk; he was a member of the rectorial council for many years. In 1984, he was appointed to the position of the Pro-rector for Student Affairs, from which he resigned, together with other representatives of the University authorities, in the name of solidarity with Rector Karol Taylor. Taylor was dismissed from his position after he, together with his co-employees, participated in the funeral of the student Marcin Antonowicz who had been fatally beaten by the Citizen's Militia of the Polish People's Republic. He became a member of the rectorial council again in 1990, when he was appointed to the position of the Pro-rector for Teaching Affairs (later the name of the position was changed into Pro-rector for Educational Affairs). Under the supervision of Rector Zbigniew Grzonka, he prepared a programme of a reform of the previous manner of teaching at the University of Gdańsk. Although the programme was accepted, it was not fully implemented. He continued holding the position of Pro-rector in the next term (his candidature was passed with one vote). During the presidential campaign in 1995, with regard to journalists' questions as to the authenticity of Aleksander Kwaśniewski's declaration of having a degree of higher education, he stated that in the light of the documents of the University, the politician had not graduated from higher education studies.

Brunon Synak was also a lecturer at the Academy of Tourism and Hotel Management (Wyższa Szkoła Turystyki i Hotelarstwa) in Gdańsk.

=== Political and local-governmental activity ===
In 1969, he was admitted to the then-ruling Polish United Workers' Party (Polska Zjednoczona Partia Robotnicza, PZPR). Later he justified the decision with conformism. After the events of August 1980, he became a member of the University branch of the Solidarity Trade Union (Niezależny Samorządny Związek Zawodowy "Solidarność"), whom he was up to 2006. He resigned from membership in the PZPR after the declaration of martial law in 1981.

In the elections of 1998, he was elected from the Electoral Action Solidarity list for the freshly established Pomeranian local government (sejmik). In 2002, he was reelected for the second term from a joint list of the Civic Platform (Platforma Obywatelska, PO) and Law and Justice (Prawo i Sprawiedliwość, PiS) (as a candidate of the Civic Platform). He was then appointed the Chairman of sejmik. He became the initiator of actions stressing the heritage and diversity of the Pomeranian province (województwo) - devoting subsequent years to particular cultural subregions of the province. In 2006, from the list of the Civic Platform, he was elected for the third term and again became the Chairman. In 2010 he decided to pull back political activity, mainly on account of his progressive illness.

As part of over-regional activity, in the years 2000–2004, Brunon Synak presided over the Baltic Sea States Subregional Co-operation Conference. He also participated in the works of the Committee of Regions of the European Union, was a Deputy Chairman of a fraction of the European People's Party in the RC. In 2004, he was a candidate for the European Parliament and gained almost 34 thousand votes.

=== Activity in the Kashubian-Pomeranian Association ===
In 1985, he became a member of the Kashubian-Pomeranian Association. Soon, he was elected a member of the Main Board of the organisation. He was there responsible for cooperation with and taking care of "Pomorania" Student Organisation, for which the Association is an umbrella organisation. On 5 December 1998, he was elected the Chairman of the Main Board of the Kashubian-Pomeranian Association (in 2000, the position was renamed as the Chairman of the Kashubian-Pomeranian Association). He held this position for the next two terms until December 2004. During his management, field structures of the Kashubian-Pomeranian Association in Kashubia developed but at the same time, branches in Kociewie and Bory Tucholskie went into decline. As a result of his actions, the buildings of the Kashubian People's University (Kaszubski Uniwersytet Ludowy) in Wieżyca and Starbienino became the Association's ownership. In February 2004, it was decided to establish the "Kashubian People's University" Foundation, and on 8 May that year, Brunon Synak became the first Chairman of the Council of the Foundation.

When he presided over the Association, Brunon Synak strived for elements of Kashubian culture and language to be present during the service and liturgy. In October 2004, he initiated the Kashubian trip to Rome to pray for the beatification of bishop Konstantyn Dominik. For the first time in the history of St Peter's Basilica in the Vatican, a mass was said with elements of the liturgy in the Kashubian language. During his presiding over the Association, in June 1999, the first Convention of Kashubians took place in Chojnice. At that time, works on the Act of 2005 on National and Ethnic Minorities and Regional Languages were in progress.

== Publications ==
Brunon Synak has published ca. 250 scientific works. His first book, a changed version of his doctoral dissertation, was "Problems of Old Farmers" ("Problemy starych rolników"), published in 1976. In 2010, he published a book "My Kashubian Path" ("Moja kaszubska stegna"), in which autobiographical threads are included with reference to his own thoughts on the fate of Kashubians from the end of WW II to the current times.

Selected publications:

- "The Image of Kashubian Community - Introductory Sociological Diagnosis" ("Obraz społeczności kaszubskiej – wstępne rozpoznanie socjologiczne") (1990),
- "Subjective Aspects of Cultural and Ethnic Identity of the People of Kashubia" ("Subiektywne aspekty tożsamości kulturowo-etnicznej ludności Kaszub") (1990),
- "Kashubian Identity - Consciousness Aspects" ("Kaszubska tożsamość – aspekty świadomościowe") (1991),
- "Kashubian Identity Today - Dangers and Prospects" ("Tożsamość kaszubska dziś – jej zagrożenia i perspektywy rozwoju") (1991),
- "Kashubian Identity. Continuity and Change" ("Kaszubska tożsamość. Ciągłość i zmiana") (1998),
- "My Kashubian Path" ("Moja kaszubska Stegna") (2010).

== Awards and distinctions ==
Under President Bronisław Komorowski's decision of 8 November 2010, Brunon Synak was appointed a Knight of the Order of Polonia Restituta "for outstanding contribution to the development of territorial government in Poland, for achievements in scientific and didactic work". In 2011, he was a laureate of the honourable distinction "For Contribution to the Pomeranian Voivodeship" ("Za Zasługi dla Województwa Pomorskiego"). For his activity in support of the development and upgrading of the Kashubian identity, in 2008, he was awarded the Florian Ceynowa Medal "Awakener of Kashubians" ("Budziciel Kaszubów").
