= Canoeing at the 1968 Summer Olympics – Women's K-2 500 metres =

The women's K-2 500 metres event was a pairs kayaking event conducted as part of the Canoeing at the 1968 Summer Olympics program. In the official report, heat times were shown in tenths of a second (0.1) while semifinal and final times were shown in hundredths of a second (0.01).

== Medalists ==
Gold	Silver	Bronze
Roswitha Esser and Annemarie Zimmermann (FRG)	Anna Pfeffer and Katalin Rozsnyói (HUN)	Lyudmila Pinayeva and Antonina Seredina (URS)

Rosznyói is shown by her married name Sági in the official report.

== Results ==
=== Heats ===
The 11 crews first raced in two heats on 20 October. The top three finishers from each of the heats advanced directly to the final; the remaining five teams were relegated to the semifinal.

Heat 1
1.	Roswitha Esser and Annemarie Zimmermann (FRG)	1:59.5	QF
2.	Valentina Serghei and Viorica Dumitru (ROU)	1:59.6	QF
3.	Lyudmila Pinayeva and Antonina Seredina (URS)	1:59.9	QF
4.	Sperry Rademaker and Marcia Smoke (USA)	2:08.9	QS
5.	Claudia Hunt and Betty Gowans (CAN)	2:12.1	QS
6.	Ann Margarit Henningsen and Angelica Zawadzki (MEX)	2:15.3	QS
Heat 2
1.	Anna Pfeffer and Katalin Rozsnyói (HUN)	2:01.0	QF
2.	Anita Kobuss and Karin Haftenberger (GDR)	2:02.8	QF
3.	Mieke Jaapies and Tjeertje Bergers-Duif (NED)	2:03.4	QF
4.	Lesley Oliver and Barbara Mean (GBR)	2:06.5	QS
5.	Izabella Antonowicz and Jadwiga Doering (POL)	2:06.8	QS

=== Semifinal ===
The top three finishers in the semifinal (raced on October 24) advanced to the final.

Semifinal
1.	Izabella Antonowicz and Jadwiga Doering (POL)	2:03.48	QF
2.	Sperry Rademaker and Marcia Smoke (USA)	2:04.54	QF
3.	Lesley Oliver and Barbara Mean (GBR)	2:06.31	QF
4.	Claudia Hunt and Betty Gowans (CAN)	2:07.88
5.	Ann Margarit Henningsen and Angelica Zawadzki (MEX)	2:10.11

=== Final ===
The final was held on October 25.

Gold	Roswitha Esser and Annemarie Zimmermann (FRG)	1:56.44
Silver	Anna Pfeffer and Katalin Rozsnyói (HUN)	1:58.60
Bronze	Lyudmila Pinayeva and Antonina Seredina (URS)	1:58.61
4.	Valentina Serghei and Viorica Dumitru (ROU)	1:59.17
5.	Anita Kobuss and Karin Haftenberger (GDR)	2:00.18
6.	Mieke Jaapies and Tjeertje Bergers-Duif (NED)	2:02.02
7.	Sperry Rademaker and Marcia Smoke (USA)	2:02.97
8.	Lesley Oliver and Barbara Mean (GBR)	2:03.70
9.	Izabella Antonowicz and Jadwiga Doering (POL)	2:04.20
