= Canoeing at the 1972 Summer Olympics – Women's K-1 500 metres =

The women's K-1 500 metres event was an individual kayaking event conducted as part of the Canoeing at the 1972 Summer Olympics program.

== Medalists ==
Gold	Silver	Bronze
Yulia Ryabchinskaya (URS)	Mieke Jaapies (NED)	Anna Pfeffer (HUN)

== Results ==
=== Heats ===
The 15 competitors first raced in two heats on September 5. The top three finishers from each of the heats advanced directly to the semifinals while the rest competed in the repechages two days later.

Heat 1
1.	Yulia Ryabchinskaya (URS)	2:09.27	QS
2.	Ingmårie Svensson (SWE)	2:11.63	QS
3.	Maria Nichiforov (ROU)	2:12.27	QS
4.	Marcia Smoke (USA)	2:12.43	QR
5.	Stanisława Szydłowska (POL)	2:14.75	QR
6.	Majorie Homer-Dixon (CAN)	2:17.38	QR
7.	Jane Rouse (GBR)	2:19.75	QR
8.	Ann McQuaid (IRL)	2:32.64	QR
Heat 2
1.	Mieke Jaapies (NED)	2:12.86	QS
2.	Anna Pfeffer (HUN)	2:13.51	QS
3.	Irene Pepinghege (FRG)	2:14.34	QS
4.	Bettina Müller (GDR)	2:15.15	QR
5.	Kate Olsen (DEN)	2:16.44	QR
6.	France Gaud (FRA)	2:23.29	QR
7.	Natasha Petrova (BUL)	2:25.49	QR

=== Repechages ===
Taking place on September 7, the top three finishers from each repechage advanced to the semifinals.

Repechage 1
1.	Marcia Smoke (USA)	2:06.19	QS
2.	Kate Olsen (DEN)	2:07.92	QS
3.	Majorie Homer-Dixon (CAN)	2:10.79	QS
4.	Natasha Petrova (BUL)	2:19.66
5.	Ann McQuaid (IRL)	2:24.56
Repechage 2
1.	Bettina Müller (GDR)	2:08.92	QS
2.	Stanisława Szydłowska (POL)	2:10.04	QS
3.	France Gaud (FRA)	2:12.94	QS
4.	Jane Rouse (GBR)	2:13.35

=== Semifinal ===
The top three finishers in of the three semifinal (raced on September 8) advanced to the final.

Semifinal 1
1.	Yulia Ryabchinskaya (URS)	2:04.67	QF
2.	Irene Pepinghege (FRG)	2:05.86	QF
3.	Bettina Müller (GDR)	2:07.90	QF
4.	Majorie Homer-Dixon (CAN)	2:12.51
Semifinal 2
1.	Mieke Jaapies (NED)	2:04.64	QF
2.	Maria Nichiforov (ROU)	2:05.23	QF
3.	Kate Olsen (DEN)	2:06.20	QF
4.	Stanisława Szydłowska (POL)	2:08.89
Semifinal 3
1.	Anna Pfeffer (HUN)	2:07.15	QF
2.	Marcia Smoke (USA)	2:09.13	QF
3.	Ingmårie Svensson (SWE)	2:11.21	QF
4.	France Gaud (FRA)	2:15.21

=== Final ===
The final was held on September 9.

Gold	Yulia Ryabchinskaya (URS)	2:03.17
Silver	Mieke Jaapies (NED)	2:04.03
Bronze	Anna Pfeffer (HUN)	2:05.50
4.	Irene Pepinghege (FRG)	2:06.55
5.	Bettina Müller (GDR)	2:06.85
6.	Maria Nichiforov (ROU)	2:07.13
7.	Kate Olsen (DEN)	2:07.16
8.	Ingmårie Svensson (SWE)	2:07.61
9.	Marcia Smoke (USA)	2:07.98
