= Ostrowite, Kartuzy County =

Ostrowite
- Village
- Location within Poland
- Coordinates: 54°12′42″N 17°48′58″E
- Country: Poland
- Voivodeship: Pomeranian
- County: Kartuzy
- Gmina: Sulęczyno

Ostrowite [ɔstrɔˈvitɛ] is a village in the administrative district of Gmina Sulęczyno, within Kartuzy County, Pomeranian Voivodeship, in northern Poland.

For details of the history of the region, see History of Pomerania.
