= Kistowo =

- Village
- Location within Poland
- Coordinates: 54°16′2″N 17°45′5″E
- Country: Poland
- Voivodeship: Pomeranian
- County: Kartuzy
- Gmina: Sulęczyno
- Population: 199

Kistowo [kisˈtɔvɔ] is a village in the administrative district of Gmina Sulęczyno, within Kartuzy County, Pomeranian Voivodeship, in northern Poland.

For details of the history of the region, see History of Pomerania.
