= Nowy Dwór, Gmina Sulęczyno =

Nowy Dwór
- Village
- Location within Poland
- Coordinates: 54°12′59″N 17°44′28″E
- Country: Poland
- Voivodeship: Pomeranian
- County: Kartuzy
- Gmina: Sulęczyno

Nowy Dwór [ˈnɔvɨ ˈdvur] is a village in the administrative district of Gmina Sulęczyno, within Kartuzy County, Pomeranian Voivodeship, in northern Poland.

For details of the history of the region, see History of Pomerania.
