= Kłodno, Pomeranian Voivodeship =

Kłodno
- Village
- Location within Poland
- Coordinates: 54°12′46″N 17°45′30″E
- Country: Poland
- Voivodeship: Pomeranian
- County: Kartuzy
- Gmina: Sulęczyno
- Population: 80

Kłodno [ˈkwɔdnɔ] is a village in the administrative district of Gmina Sulęczyno, within Kartuzy County, Pomeranian Voivodeship, in northern Poland.
