= Bukowa Góra, Gmina Sulęczyno =

Bukowa Góra
- Village
- Location within Poland
- Coordinates: 54°14′42″N 17°48′32″E
- Country: Poland
- Voivodeship: Pomeranian
- County: Kartuzy
- Gmina: Sulęczyno
- Population: 109

Bukowa Góra ([buˈkɔva ˈɡura]; German: Bukowagorra, 1942–45 Eichenberg) is a village in the administrative district of Gmina Sulęczyno, within Kartuzy County, Pomeranian Voivodeship, in northern Poland.

For details of the history of the region, see History of Pomerania.
