= Borowiec, Gmina Sulęczyno =

Borowiec
- Village
- Location within Poland
- Coordinates: 54°13′46″N 17°53′25″E
- Country: Poland
- Voivodeship: Pomeranian
- County: Kartuzy
- Gmina: Sulęczyno
- Population: 139

Borowiec [bɔˈrɔvjɛt͡s] is a village in the administrative district of Gmina Sulęczyno, within Kartuzy County, Pomeranian Voivodeship, in northern Poland.

For details of the history of the region, see History of Pomerania.
