= Maria van der Holst-Blijlevens =

Dutch canoeist

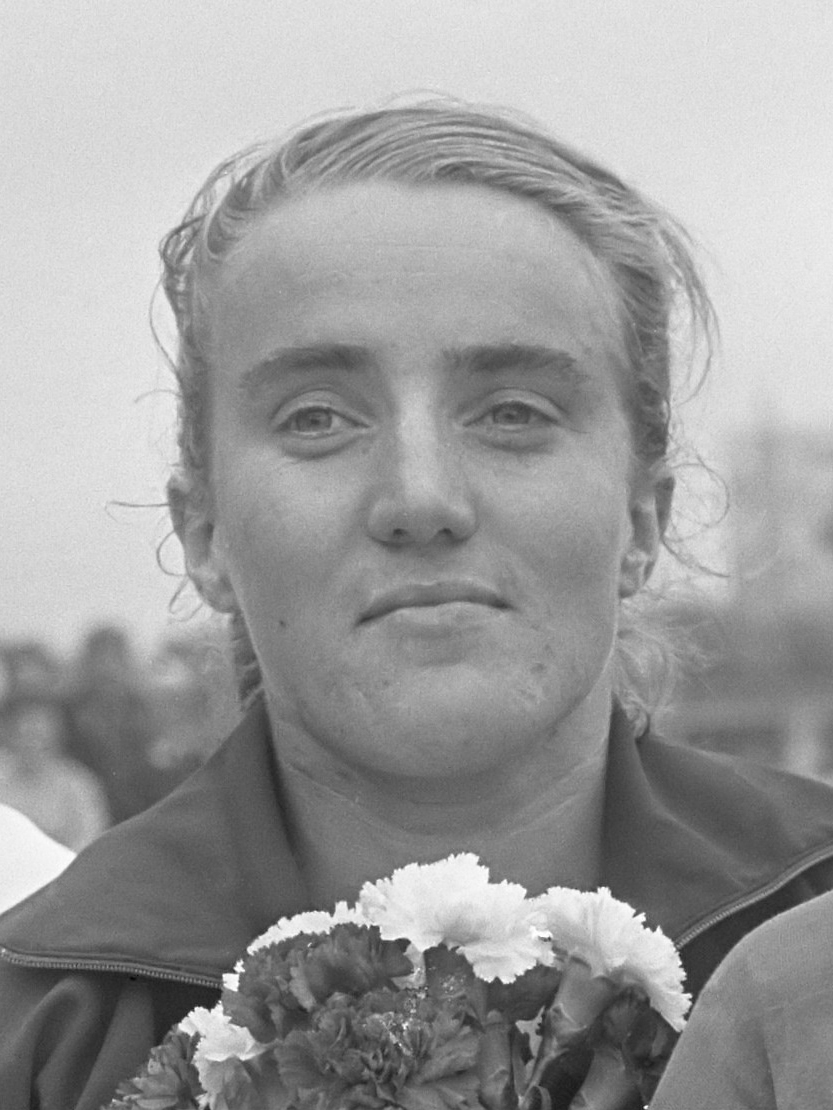
- Maria Blijlevens (1967)

Personal information
- Born: 6 May 1946 (age 80) Helmond, the Netherlands
- Height: 1.71 m (5 ft 7 in)
- Weight: 73 kg (161 lb)

Sport
- Sport: Canoe racing
- Club: De Helmvaarders, Helmond

Maria van der Holst-Blijlevens (born 6 May 1946) is a Dutch sprint canoer who competed in the early 1970s. Together with Mieke Jaapies she finished seventh in the K-2 500 m event at the 1972 Summer Olympics in Munich.
