= Duif =

Duif ("dove, pigeon") is an archaic Dutch male given name and patronymic surname. Variant spellings include Duijf, Duyf and Duive. Female forms are Duifje, Duifke, Duijfie, etc., some of which are still in use.

- Jan Ariens Duif (1617–1649), Dutch Golden Age painter from Gouda
- Tjeertje Bergers-Duif (born 1944), Dutch sprint canoer

Duyff

- Jan Willem Duyff (1907–1969), Dutch World War II resistance fighter

== See also ==
- De Duif, a church on the Prinsengracht in Amsterdam
- Daub
- Douwe, West-Frisian given name of the same origin
