= Widna Góra, Pomeranian Voivodeship =

Widna Góra
- Village
- Location within Poland
- Coordinates: 54°17′50″N 17°49′13″E
- Country: Poland
- Voivodeship: Pomeranian
- County: Kartuzy
- Gmina: Sulęczyno
- Population: 144

Widna Góra [ˈvidna ˈɡura] is a village in the administrative district of Gmina Sulęczyno, within Kartuzy County, Pomeranian Voivodeship, in northern Poland.

For details of the history of the region, see History of Pomerania.
