= Borek, Pomeranian Voivodeship =

Borek
- Village
- Location within Poland
- Coordinates: 54°17′N 17°48′E
- Country: Poland
- Voivodeship: Pomeranian
- County: Kartuzy
- Gmina: Sulęczyno
- Population: 140

Borek [ˈbɔrɛk] is a village in the administrative district of Gmina Sulęczyno, within Kartuzy County, Pomeranian Voivodeship, in northern Poland.

For more details of the history of the region, see History of Pomerania.
