= Chojna, Gmina Sulęczyno =

Chojna
- Village
- Location within Poland
- Coordinates: 54°17′5″N 17°43′45″E
- Country: Poland
- Voivodeship: Pomeranian
- County: Kartuzy
- Gmina: Sulęczyno

Chojna [ˈxɔi̯na] is a village in the administrative district of Gmina Sulęczyno, within Kartuzy County, Pomeranian Voivodeship, in northern Poland.

For details of the history of the region, see History of Pomerania.
