= Ogonki =

Ogonki may refer to:

- Ogonki, Pomeranian Voivodeship (north Poland)
- Ogonki, Warmian-Masurian Voivodeship (north-east Poland)
- Ogonki, plural of ogonek, a diacritic mark used in Polish
