= Zimna Góra =

- Settlement
- Location within Poland
- Coordinates: 54°14′9″N 17°45′27″E
- Country: Poland
- Voivodeship: Pomeranian
- County: Kartuzy
- Gmina: Sulęczyno

Zimna Góra [ˈʑimna ˈɡura] is a settlement in the administrative district of Gmina Sulęczyno, within Kartuzy County, Pomeranian Voivodeship, in northern Poland.

For details of the history of the region, see History of Pomerania.
