= Jadwiga Doering =

Polish sprint canoer

Personal information
- National team: Poland
- Born: November 2, 1938 Podjazy, Pomeranian Voivodeship, Second Polish Republic
- Died: April 24, 2018 (aged 79) Gdańsk, Pomeranian Voivodeship, Poland

Sport
- Sport: Sprint canoeing
- Event: K-2 500 m

Achievements and titles
- Olympic finals: 1968 Summer Olympics (9th place)

Jadwiga Doering (2 November 1938 in Podjazy, Pomeranian Voivodeship, Second Polish Republic – 24 April 2018 in Gdańsk, Pomeranian Voivodeship, Third Polish Republic) was a Polish sprint canoer who competed in the late 1960s. She finished ninth in the K-2 500 m event at the 1968 Summer Olympics in Mexico City.
