= Węsiory =

- Village
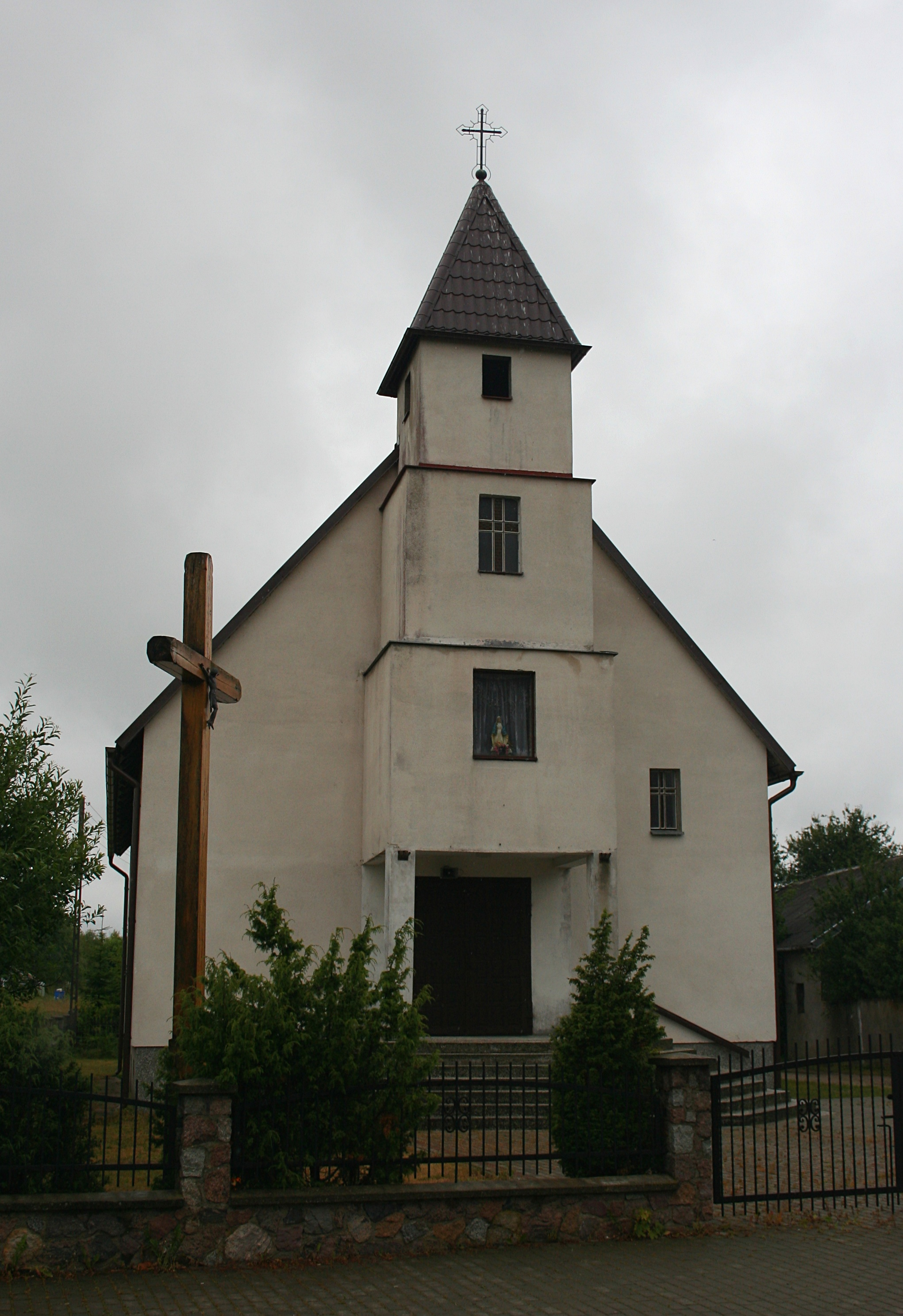
- The church in Węsiory

- Location within Poland
- Coordinates: 54°13′52″N 17°50′36″E
- Country: Poland
- Voivodeship: Pomeranian
- County: Kartuzy
- Gmina: Sulęczyno
- Population: 745
- Website: http://wesiory.pl/

Węsiory [vɛ̃ˈɕɔrɨ] is a village in the administrative district of Gmina Sulęczyno, within Kartuzy County, Pomeranian Voivodeship, in northern Poland.

For details of the history of the region, see History of Pomerania.

Near the village is a concentration of stone circles and burial places of the Wielbark Culture.

== Gallery - Iron Age stone circles and burial places ==
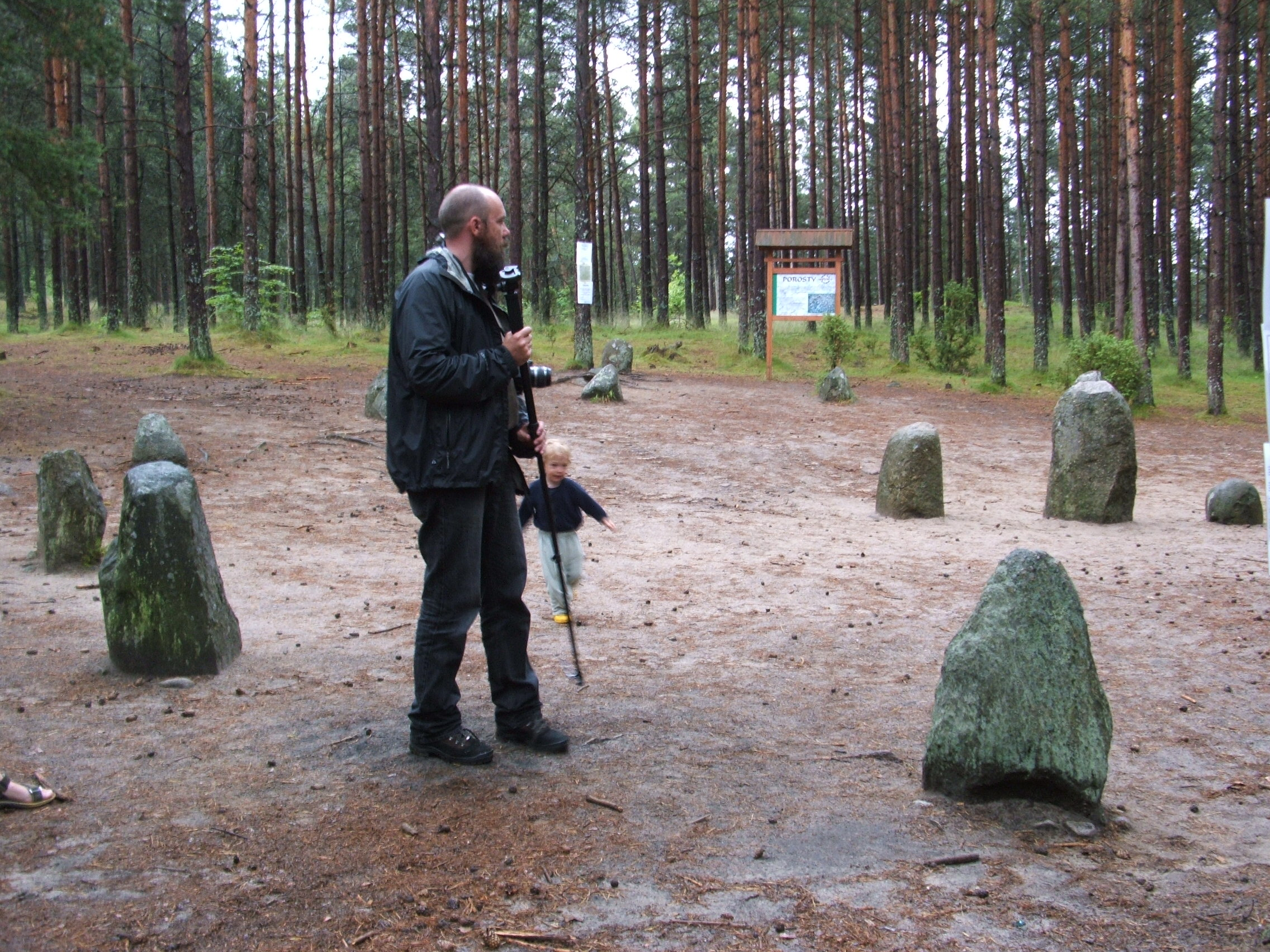

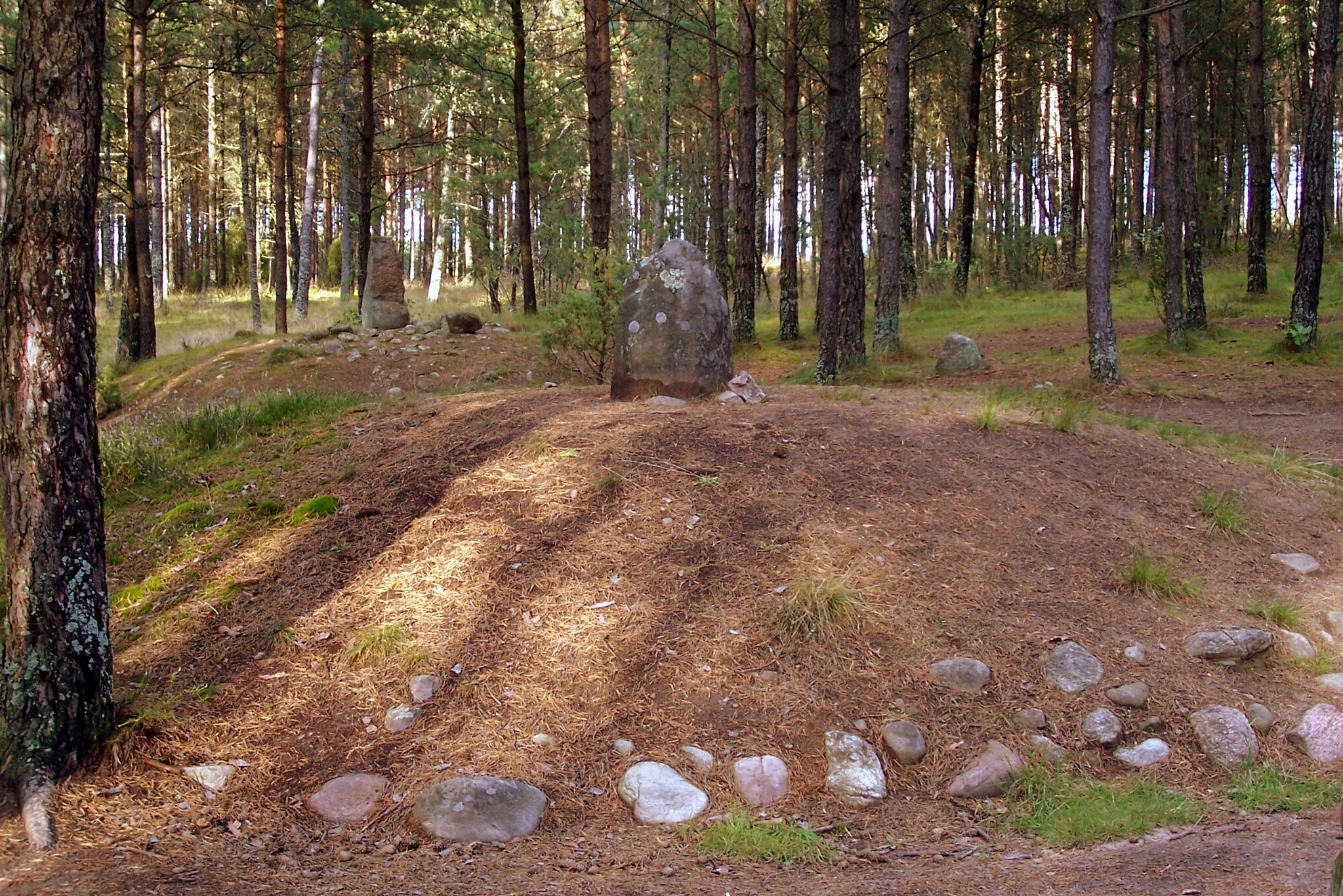

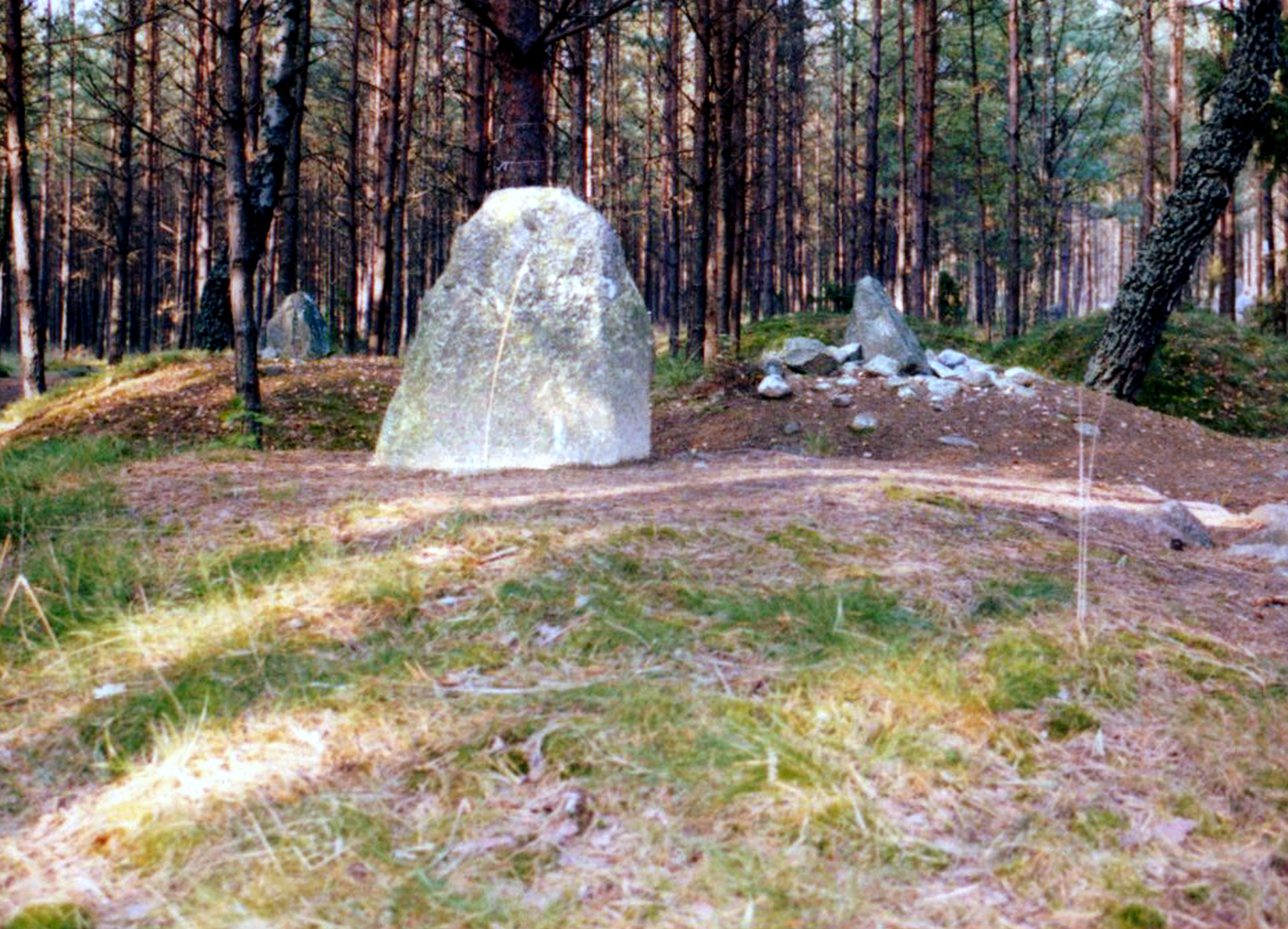

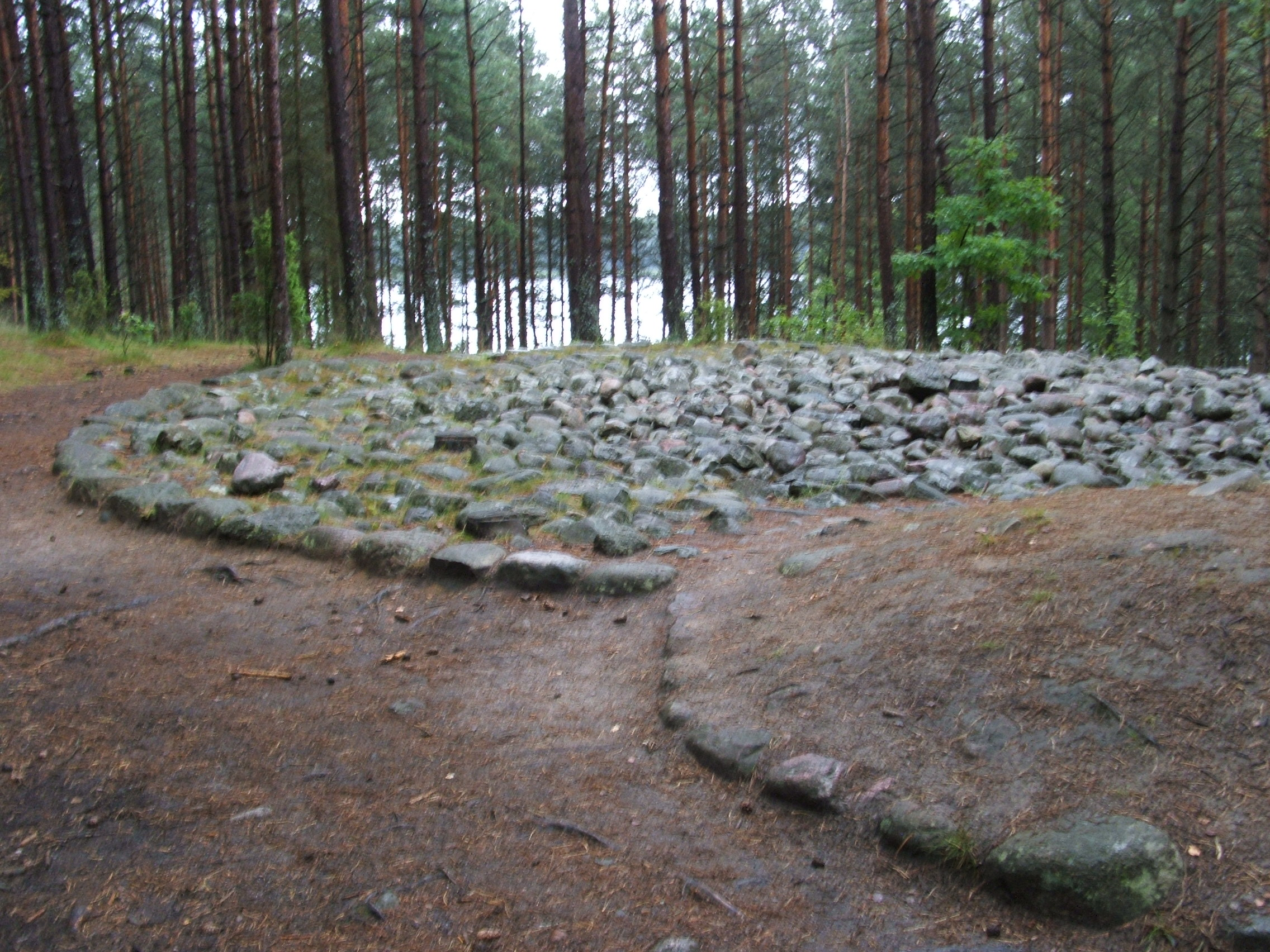

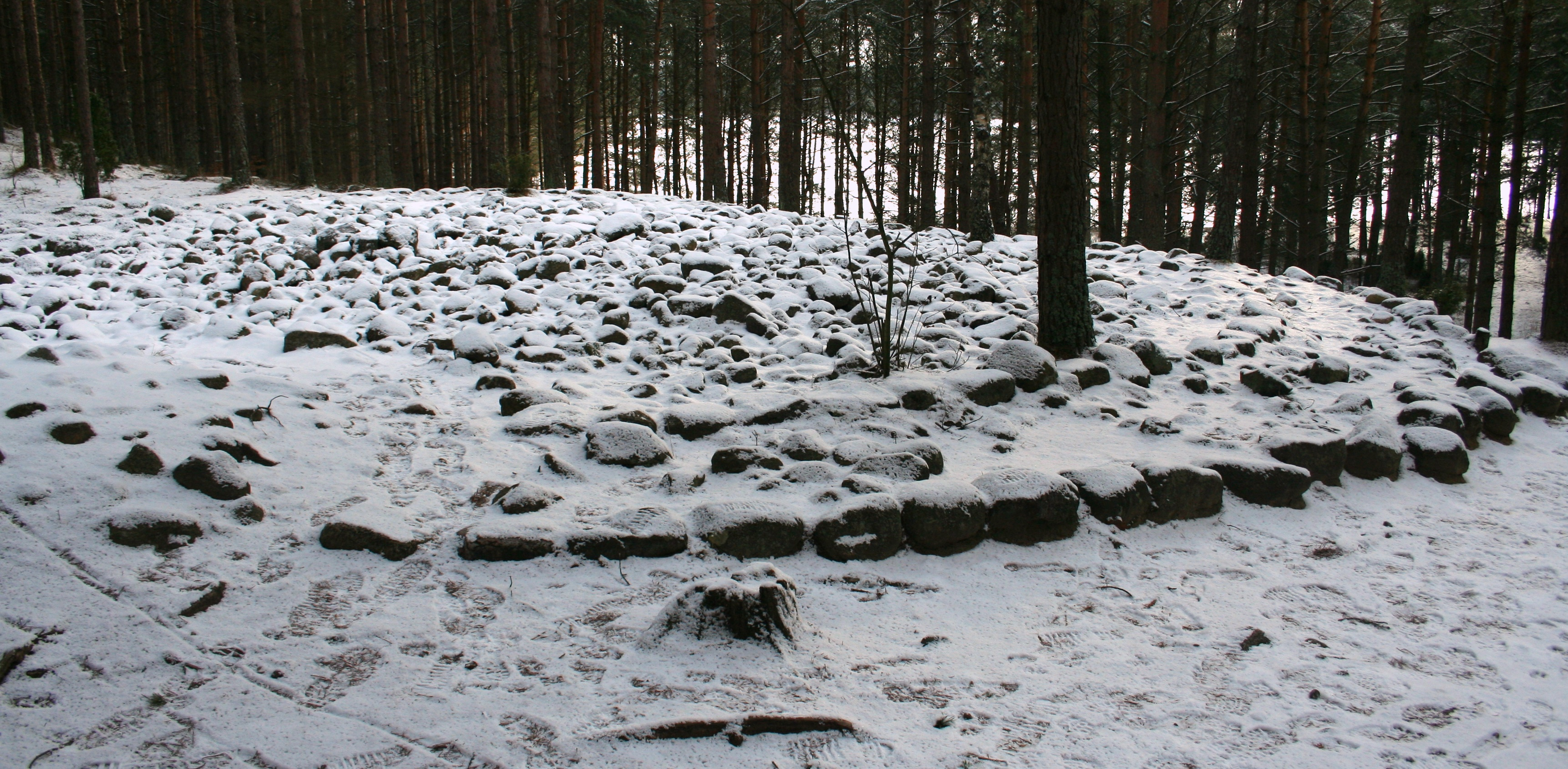
