= Sulecki Borek =

- Settlement
- Location within Poland
- Coordinates: 54°13′35″N 17°49′4″E
- Country: Poland
- Voivodeship: Pomeranian
- County: Kartuzy
- Gmina: Sulęczyno

Sulecki Borek [suˈlɛt͡ski ˈbɔrɛk] is a settlement in the administrative district of Gmina Sulęczyno, within Kartuzy County, Pomeranian Voivodeship, in northern Poland.

For details of the history of the region, see History of Pomerania.
