= Ostrów-Mausz =

- Village
- Location within Poland
- Coordinates: 54°12′12″N 17°43′24″E
- Country: Poland
- Voivodeship: Pomeranian
- County: Kartuzy
- Gmina: Sulęczyno

Ostrów-Mausz [ˈɔstruf ˈmauʂ] is a village in the administrative district of Gmina Sulęczyno, within Kartuzy County, Pomeranian Voivodeship, in northern Poland.

For details of the history of the region, see History of Pomerania.
