= Nancy Purves =

American canoeist (born 1949)

Nancy Purves (born August 6, 1949 in Topeka, Kansas) is an American sprint canoer who competed in the early 1970s. She was eliminated in the semifinals of the K-2 500 m event at the 1972 Summer Olympics in Munich.
