= Sperry Rademaker =

American canoeist

Sperry Jones Rademaker (October 4, 1939 – January 31, 2005) was an American sprint canoer who competed at the 1968 Summer Olympics in Mexico City. She finished seventh in the K-2 500 m event.

A native of Oklahoma City, Oklahoma, she was the older sister of Marcia Jones-Smoke who won a bronze medal in the K-1 500 m event at the 1964 Summer Olympics in Tokyo.
