= Pamela Renshaw =

British sprint canoer (born 1951)

Pamela Renshaw (born 3 March 1951) is a British canoe sprinter who competed in the early 1970s. She was eliminated from the semi-finals of the K-2 500 m event at the 1972 Summer Olympics in Munich.
