= Ewa Kamińska-Eichler =

Polish canoeist

Ewa Urszula Kamińska-Eichler (born 17 May 1953 in Elbląg) is a Polish sprint canoeist who competed in the late 1970s and early 1980s. Competing in two Summer Olympics, she earned her best finish of fourth in the K-1 500 m event at Montreal in 1976.
