= Claudia Hunt =

Canadian canoeist (born 1950)

Claudia Hunt (born March 12, 1950, in Montreal) is a Canadian sprint canoer who competed in the late 1960s and early 1970s. Competing in two Summer Olympics, she was eliminated in the semifinals of the K-2 500 m event in both 1968 and 1972.
