= Viorica Dumitru =

Romanian canoeist (born 1946)

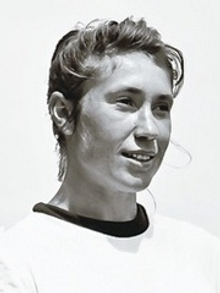

Personal information
- Born: 4 August 1946 (age 79) Bucharest, Romania
- Height: 165 cm (5 ft 5 in)
- Weight: 64 kg (141 lb)

Sport
- Sport: Canoe sprint
- Club: CS Dinamo București
Medal record
Representing Romania
Olympic Games
| Bronze medal – third place | 1968 Mexico City | K-1 500 m |
| Bronze medal – third place | 1972 Munich | K-2 500 m |
World Championships
| Bronze medal – third place | 1973 Tampere | K-1 500 m |
| Bronze medal – third place | 1973 Tampere | K-4 500 m |
| Silver medal – second place | 1974 Mexico City | K-2 500 m |
| Bronze medal – third place | 1974 Mexico City | K-4 500 m |

Viorica Dumitru (born 4 August 1946) is a retired Romanian sprint canoer. She competed at the 1968 and 1972 Olympics and 1973 and 1974 world championships and won one silver and five bronze medals in various events. She also placed fourth in the K-2 500 m final at the 1968 Olympics, 0.57 seconds behind the second and third places.
