= Lesley Oliver =

British canoeist (born 1948)

Lesley Oliver (born 31 August 1948) is a British canoe sprinter who competed in the late 1960s. She won the National K-1 3000 metres title in 1967 and finished eighth in the K-2 500 m event at the 1968 Summer Olympics in Mexico City.
