= Marita Skogh =

Swedish canoeist (born 1956)

Marita Skogh (born 29 December 1956) is a Swedish sprint canoeist who competed in the late 1970s. She was eliminated in the repechages of the K-1 500 m event at the 1976 Summer Olympics in Montreal.
