= Betty Gowans =

Canadian canoeist

Betty Gowans (born April 18, 1947) is a Canadian sprint canoer. Born in Montreal, Quebec, Canada, Gowans competed in the late 1960s. She was eliminated in the semifinals of the K-2 500 m event at the 1968 Summer Olympics in Mexico City.
