= Borek Kamienny =

- Village
- Location within Poland
- Coordinates: 54°16′39″N 17°45′29″E
- Country: Poland
- Voivodeship: Pomeranian
- County: Kartuzy
- Gmina: Sulęczyno
- Population: 64

Borek Kamienny [ˈbɔrɛk kaˈmjɛnnɨ] is a village in the administrative district of Gmina Sulęczyno, within Kartuzy County, Pomeranian Voivodeship, in northern Poland.

For details of the history of the region, see History of Pomerania.
