= Françoise Bonetat =

French canoeist (born 1944)

Françoise Bonetat (born March 27, 1944) is a French sprint canoer who competed in the late 1970s. She was eliminated in the repechages of the K-1 500 m event at the 1976 Summer Olympics in Montreal.
