= Stanisława Szydłowska =

Polish canoeist

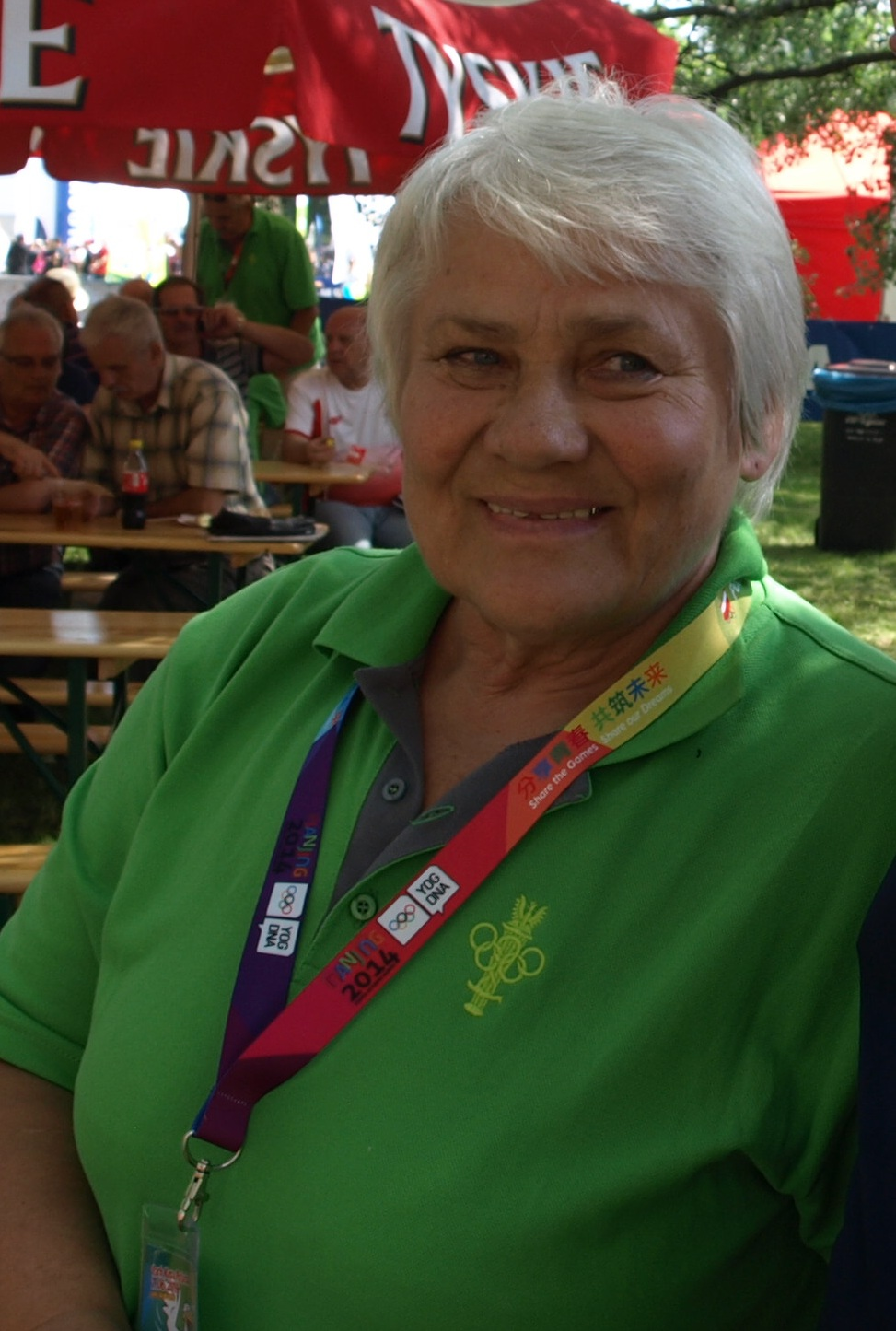
Stanislawa Szydlowska

Stanisława Teresa Szydłowska (born 21 April 1944 in Zaręby Kościelne) is a Polish sprint canoeist who competed in the late 1960s and early 1970s. Competing in two Summer Olympics, she was eliminated in the semifinals in the K-1 500 m event both in 1968 and in 1972.
