= Tjeertje Bergers-Duif =

Dutch canoeist (born 1944)

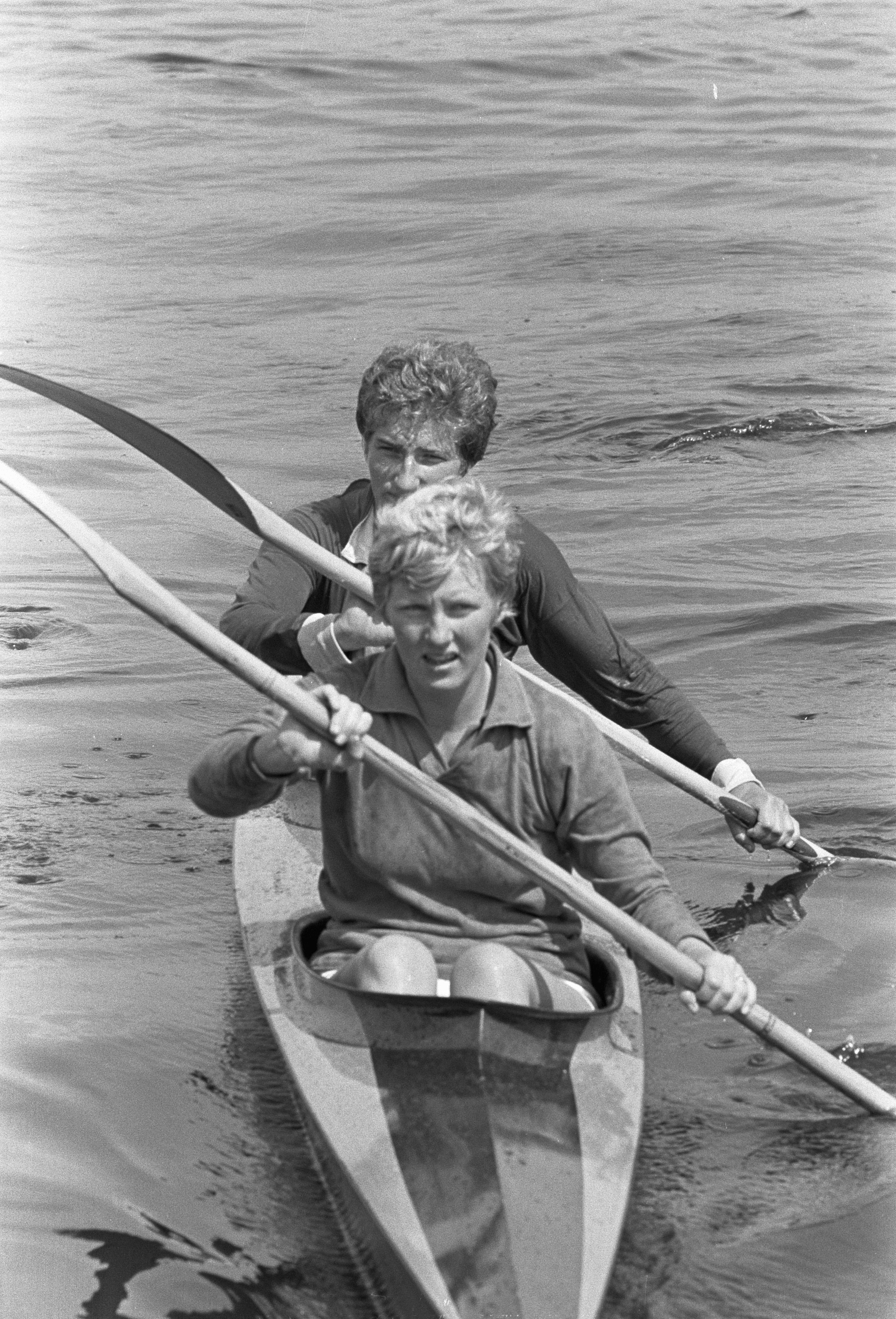
- Bergers-Duif and Mieke Jaapies (back) in 1966

Personal information
- Born: 13 September 1944 (age 82) Zaandam, the Netherlands
- Height: 1.65 m (5 ft 5 in)
- Weight: 60 kg (130 lb)

Sport
- Sport: Canoe racing

Thea "Tjeertje" Bergers-Duif (born 13 September 1944) is a Dutch sprint canoer who competed in the late 1960s. Together with Mieke Jaapies she finished sixth in the K-2 500 m event at the 1968 Summer Olympics in Mexico City.
