= Brigitte Vernaillen =

Belgian sprint canoer (born 1958)

Brigitte Vernaillen (Schoten, 6 April 1958) is a Belgian canoe sprinter who competed in the late 1970s. She was eliminated in the repechages of the K-1 500 m event at the 1976 Summer Olympics in Montreal. Together with Marleen Kuppens she was selected for the K-2 500 m at the 1980 Summer Olympics in Moscow.
