= Ilse Kaschube =

German canoe sprinter (born 1953)

Medal record

Women's canoe sprint

Olympic Games
Silver medal – second place	1972 Munich	K-2 500 m

World Championships
Gold medal – first place	1973 Tampere	K-2 500 m
Gold medal – first place	1974 Mexico City	K-4 500 m

Ilse Kaschube (later Zeisler; born 25 June 1953 in Altentreptow, Bezirk Neubrandenburg) is an East German canoe sprinter who competed in the early 1970s. She won a silver medal in the K-2 500 m event at the 1972 Summer Olympics in Munich.

Kaschube also won two gold medals at the ICF Canoe Sprint World Championships with one in the K-2 500 m event (1973) and one in the K-4 500 m event (1974).
