= Bettina Müller (canoeist) =

Medal record

Women's canoe sprint

World Championships
Gold medal – first place	1975 Belgrade	K-4 500 m
Bronze medal – third place	1971 Belgrade	K-4 500 m

Bettina Müller (born 24 July 1952) is an East German sprint canoer who competed in the early to mid-1970s. She won two medals in the K-4 500 m event at the ICF Canoe Sprint World Championships with a gold in 1975 and a bronze in 1971.

Müller also finished fifth in the K-1 500 m event at the 1972 Summer Olympics in Munich.
