= Sheila Burnett =

British sprint canoeist

Sheila Burnett (born 4 July 1949) is a British sprint canoeist who competed in the 1970s. She is believed to be the first woman to complete the Devizes to Westminster marathon canoe race, which she entered in 1971 as part of a mixed crew with Colin Dickens, then a fellow member of Cambridge University Canoe Club. Women were at that time barred from the event, so Sheila sent in her entry using her initials rather than her full forenames to disguise her gender. Sheila and her partner successfully completed the 125 mile course, but were subsequently disqualified as ineligible and did not appear in the official results. Although unofficial reports of their race time are contradictory, evidence suggests that they finished the event in just under 35 hours, including an overnight stop. Sheila went on to represent Great Britain at the 1976 Summer Olympics in Montreal, where she was eliminated in the semifinals of the K-1 500 m event.
