= Ing-Marie Svensson =

Swedish canoeist (born 1950)

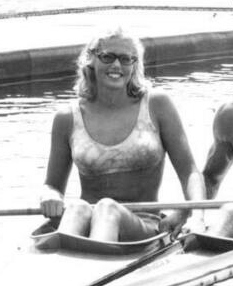
- Svensson at the 1968 Olympics

Personal information
- Born: 13 January 1950 (age 76) Sollentuna, Sweden
- Height: 172 cm (5 ft 8 in)
- Weight: 60 kg (132 lb)

Sport
- Sport: Canoe sprint
- Club: KK Glid; Sollentuna Kanotsällskap

Barbro Ing-Marie Svensson (married Blom; born 13 January 1950) is a Swedish retired sprint canoer. Competing in the K-1 500 m event she placed seventh and eights at the 1968 and 1972 Olympics, respectively. She is married to the Norwegian Olympic sprint canoer Per Blom.
