= Barbara Mean =

British sprint canoer (born 1950)

Barbara Mean (born 5 January 1950) is a British canoe sprinter who competed in the late 1960s. She finished eighth in the K-2 500 m event at the 1968 Summer Olympics in Mexico City.
