= Valentina Serghei =

Romanian canoeist (born 1948)

Valentina Serghei (born February 14, 1948) is a Romanian sprint canoer who competed in the late 1960s. She finished fourth in the K-2 500 m event at the 1968 Summer Olympics in Mexico City.
