= France Gaud =

French canoeist

Françoise "France" Gaud (born April 9, 1947) is a French sprint canoer who competed in the early 1970s. She was eliminated in the semifinals of the K-1 500 m event at the 1972 Summer Olympics in Munich.
