= Jane Rouse =

British sprint canoer (born 1946)

Jane Rouse (born 23 April 1946) is a British canoe sprinter who competed in the early 1970s. She was eliminated in the repechages of the K-1 500 m event at the 1972 Summer Olympics in Munich.
