= Iva Vávrová =

Czech canoeist (born 1943)

Iva Várová (born 1 December 1943 in Hradec Králové) is a Czech sprint canoer who competed for Czechoslovakia in the late 1960s. She finished fifth in the K-1 500 m event at the 1968 Summer Olympics in Mexico City.
