= Oldřiška Kaplanová =

Czechoslovak sprint canoer (born 1944)

Oldřiška Kaplanová (born 21 December 1944 in Tišnov) is a Czechoslovak sprint canoer who competed in the early 1970s. She finished ninth in the K-2 500 m event at the 1972 Summer Olympics in Munich. She was a multi-time national champion.
