= Sylvia Jackson (canoeist) =

British sprint canoer (born 1945)

Sylvia Jackson (born 12 June 1945) is a British former canoe sprinter who competed in the late 1960s. She participated in the K-1 500 m event at the 1968 Summer Olympics in Mexico City, where she was eliminated in the semifinals.
