= Yulia Ryabchinskaya =

Ukrainian soviet canoe racer (1947–1973)

Medal record

Women's canoe sprint

Olympic Games
Gold medal – first place	1972 Munich	K-1 500 m

World Championships
Gold medal – first place	1971 Belgrade	K-4 500 m

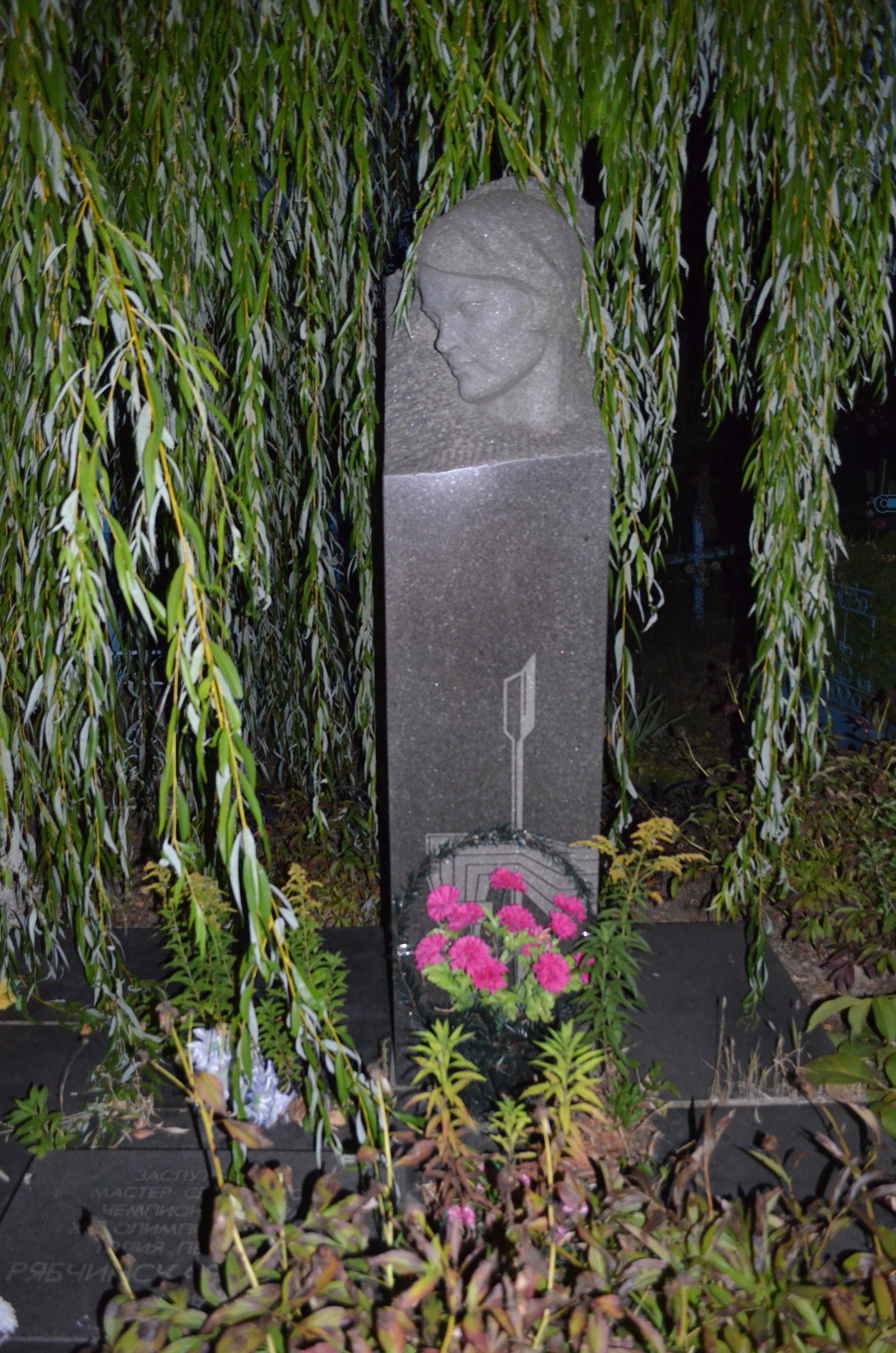
Grave of Yulia Ryabchinskaya.

Yulia Ryabchinskaya (21 January 1947 – 13 January 1973) was a canoeist from Ukraine and Olympic champion. She represented the USSR at the 1972 Summer Olympics in Munich, winning the gold in the K-1 500 m event.

Only four months after her Olympic victory, Ryabchinskaya was taking part in winter training at Lake Paliastomi in the Soviet republic of Georgia when she fell into the water and died from abrupt cooling. An international competition is held in her honor in Moscow every spring.

Ryabchinskaya also won a gold in the K-4 500 m event at the 1971 ICF Canoe Sprint World Championships in Belgrade.
