= Ann Margarit Henningsen =

Mexican canoeist (born 1949)

Ann Margarit Henningsen (born October 11, 1949, in the state of Schleswig-Holstein, Germany) is a Mexican sprint canoer who competed in the late 1960s. At the 1968 Summer Olympics, she was eliminated in the semifinals both in the K-1 500 m and K-2 500 m events.
