= Helen Woodhouse =

British sprint canoer (born 1953)

Helen Woodhouse (born 6 May 1953) is a British canoe sprinter who competed in the early 1970s. She was eliminated in the semifinals of the K-2 500 m event at the 1972 Summer Olympics in Munich.

== Education ==
She was educated at St. Michael's Catholic Grammar School in North Finchley, London.
