= Gmina Sulęczyno =

Gmina Sulęczyno Sulęczyno Commune
- Gmina
- Coat of arms
- Interactive map of Gmina Sulęczyno
- Coordinates (Sulęczyno): 54°14′N 17°46′E
- Country: Poland
- Voivodeship: Pomeranian
- County: Kartuzy
- Seat: Sulęczyno

Area
  - Total: 131.31 km^{2} (50.70 sq mi)

Population (2006)
  - Total: 4,886
  - Density: 37.21/km^{2} (96.37/sq mi)
- Website: http://www.suleczyno.pl

Gmina Sulęczyno (Kashubian: Sëlëczëno) is a rural gmina (administrative district) in Kartuzy County, Pomeranian Voivodeship, in northern Poland. Its seat is the village of Sulęczyno, which lies approximately 31 kilometres (19 mi) west of Kartuzy and 59 km (37 mi) west of the regional capital Gdańsk.

The gmina covers an area of 131.31 square kilometres (50.7 sq mi), and as of 2006 its total population is 4,886.

== Villages ==
Gmina Sulęczyno contains the villages and settlements of Amalka, Bielawki, Borek, Borek Kamienny, Borowiec, Bukowa Góra, Chojna, Czarlino, Kistówko, Kistowo, Kłodno, Kołodzieje, Mściszewice, Nowy Dwór, Ogonki, Opoka, Ostrów-Mausz, Ostrowite, Podjazy, Sucha, Sulecki Borek, Sulęczyno, Węsiory, Widna Góra, Żakowo, Zdunowice, Zdunowice Małe and Zimna Góra.

== Neighbouring gminas ==
Gmina Sulęczyno is bordered by the gminas of Kościerzyna, Lipusz, Parchowo, Sierakowice and Stężyca.
