= Ann McQuaid =

Irish canoeist (born 1951)

Ann McQuaid (born 26 August 1951) is an Irish canoe sprinter who competed in the early 1970s. She was eliminated in the repechages of the K-1 500 m event at the 1972 Summer Olympics in Munich.
