= Petrana Koleva =

Bulgarian canoeist (born 1947)

Petrana Koleva (Bulgarian: Петрана Колева; born 11 October 1947) is a Bulgarian sprint canoer who competed in the early 1970s. She finished eighth in the K-2 500 m event at the 1972 Summer Olympics in Munich.
