= Ewa Grajkowska-Stańko =

Polish canoeist (born 1948)

Ewa Grajkowska-Stańko (born 26 October 1948 in Gorzów Wielkopolski) is a Polish sprint canoer who competed in the early 1970s. She finished sixth in the K-2 500 m event at the 1972 Summer Olympics in Munich.
