= Irene Pepinghege =

German canoeist

Medal record

Women's canoe sprint

World Championships
Silver medal – second place	1966 East-Berlin	K-4 500 m
Silver medal – second place	1971 Belgrade	K-4 500 m
Bronze medal – third place	1970 Copenhagen	K-4 500 m

Irene Pepinghege-Rozema (born 11 February 1941) is a West German canoe sprinter who competed in the early to mid-1970s. She won three medals in the K-4 500 m event at the ICF Canoe Sprint World Championships with two silver in 1966 and 1971 and also a bronze in 1970.

Pepinghege also competed in three Summer Olympics, earning her best finish of fourth in the K-1 500 m event at Munich in 1972.
