= Anastázie Fridrichová-Hajná =

Czechoslovak sprint canoer

Anastázie Fridrichová-Hajná (born 1 January 1946) is a Czechoslovak canoe sprinter who competed for Czechoslovakia in the early to mid-1970s. Competing in two Summer Olympics, she earned her best finish of sixth in the K-1 500 m event at the 1976 Montreal Olympics.
