= Sulęczyno =

- Village
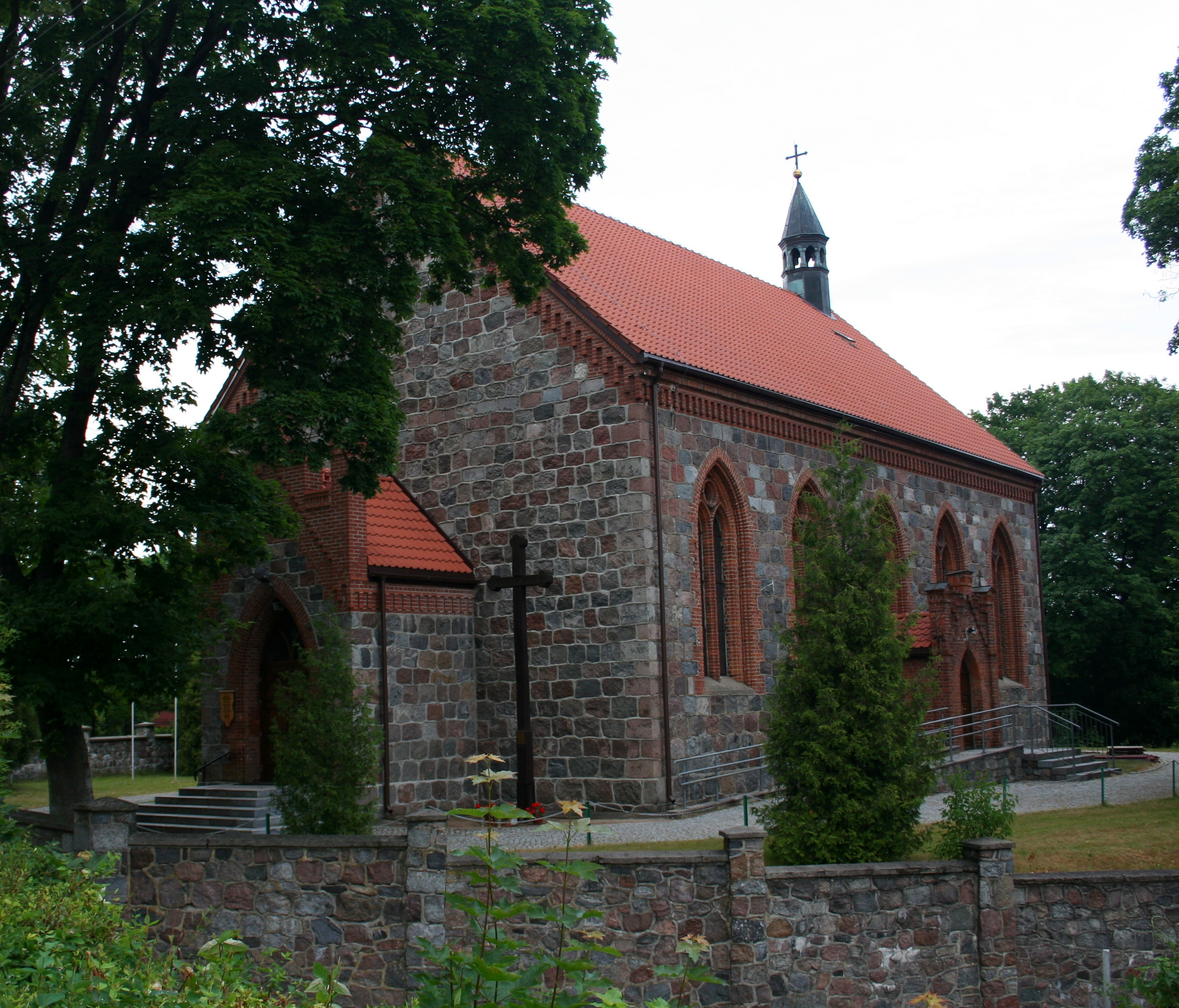
- Holy Trinity Church

- Coat of arms

- Location within Poland
- Coordinates: 54°14′N 17°46′E
- Country: Poland
- Voivodeship: Pomeranian
- County: Kartuzy
- Gmina: Sulęczyno
- Population: 1,500
- Time zone: UTC+1 (CET)
  - Summer (DST): UTC+2 (CEST)
- Vehicle registration: GKA

Sulęczyno [sulɛnˈt͡ʂɨnɔ] is a village in Kartuzy County, Pomeranian Voivodeship, in northern Poland. It is the seat of the gmina (administrative district) called Gmina Sulęczyno.

It is located on the shores of the Węgorzyno, Guścierz Duży and Guścierz Mały lakes, within the ethnocultural region of Kashubia in the historic region of Pomerania.

== History ==
Sulęczyno was a private village of Polish nobility, administratively located in the Mirachowo County in the Pomeranian Voivodeship of the Kingdom of Poland.

During the German occupation of Poland (World War II), local priest Tadeusz Zapałowski was murdered during a massacre of Polish priests from the region perpetrated by the Einsatzkommando 16 in November 1939 in the forest near Kartuzy (see: Nazi persecution of the Catholic Church in Poland).
