= Julie Leach =

American Olympic Kayak athlete (born 1957)

Medal record

Women's triathlon

Representing United States

Ironman World Championship
Gold medal – first place	1982 (Oct)	Individual

Julie Leach (born February 23, 1957) is an American Olympic Kayak athlete who competed in the 1976 Montreal Olympics, then switched to triathlon. After winning numerous races she won the Oct '82 Hawaiian Ironman World Championship. Julie has two children with Bill Leach: Shane (3–23–88) and Hayden (7–1–93). She taught Earth science at Arnold O. Beckman High School in Irvine, California until 2012.

== Canoeing career ==
Julie started her paddling career in 1971 and in 1974 she competed in the Jr. World Championships Poznan, Poland. In 1975 she finished 7th in the K-1 finals and followed that up in the 1976 Summer Olympics in Montreal, finishing 7th in the women's K-1 500 m event. She also won the Molokai to Oahu Outrigger Race in 1986 as part of the Off Shore Outrigger Team from Newport Beach, Calif., the first time a non-Hawaiian team won the World Championships. This was the first of several victories that Off Shore, coached by Billy Whitford, won over the next decade. In 1987 she won the Molokai to Oahu Surf Ski race; considered the World Championship of the sport at the time. After teaching fitness and PE classes at Irvine Valley College Julie was hired to coach the IVC inaugural Men's and women's Cross Country in 1991. The women's team won their first California State Community College Championship in '91 and again in '93. For that feat she was recognized as the Calif State CC Coach of the Year. She now lives in Hawaii with her husband Bill.

== Triathlon career ==
Leach switched from flatwater canoeing to triathlon, winning the Hawaii Ironman Triathlon in October 1982. In 1986 she competed in the Molokai Outrigger Race with Offshore Canoe Club of Newport Beach and placed 1st Overall, the first time a non-Hawaiian Team won the World Championship. In 1987 she won the Molokai Surf Ski race which is considered the World Championship in that sport. The race leaves from the West End of Molokai and ends on Oahu. She continues to train to stay in shape through riding a bike and weight lifting and enjoys boogie boarding during the summer.

Date	Position	Event	Swim time	Bike time	Run time	transition time	Total time
October 1982	1st	Ironman Triathlon, Hawaii	1:04:57	5:50:36	3:58:35		10:54:08
