= Rosa Georgieva =

Bulgarian canoeist (born 1956)

Rosa Georgieva (born December 17, 1956) is a Bulgarian sprint canoer who competed in the late 1970s. She finished ninth in the Women's K-1 500 metres at the 1976 Summer Olympics in Montreal.
