= Kate Olsen =

Danish canoeist

Kate Olsen (born November 23, 1946) is a Danish sprint canoer who competed in the early to mid-1970s. Competing in two Summer Olympics, she earned he best finish of seventh in the K-1 500 m event at Munich in 1972.
