= Izabella Antonowicz =

Polish canoeist

Izabella Antonowicz-Szuszkiewicz (born March 16, 1942, in Vilnius) is a Polish sprint canoer who competed from the mid-1960s to the early 1970s. Competing in three Summer Olympics, she earned her best finish of sixth in the K-2 500 m event at Munich in 1972.

Antonowicz's husband, Władysław (1938–2007), also competed as a sprint canoer during the 1960s and 1970s.
