= Maria Nichiforov =

Romanian canoeist (1951–2022)

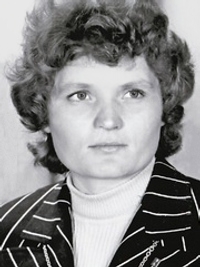

Personal information
- Born: 9 April 1951 Mila 23, Romania
- Died: 24 June 2022 (aged 71)
- Height: 168 cm (5 ft 6 in)
- Weight: 71 kg (157 lb)

Sport
- Sport: Canoe sprint
- Club: CS Dinamo București
Medal record
Representing Romania
Olympic Games
Bronze medal – third place	1972 Munich	K-2 500 m
World Championships
Bronze medal – third place	1973 Tampere	K-4 500 m
Bronze medal – third place	1974 Mexico City	K-4 500 m
Silver medal – second place	1974 Mexico City	K-2 500 m
Bronze medal – third place	1975 Belgrade	K-1 500 m

Maria Nichiforov (later Mihoreanu, 9 April 1951 – 24 June 2022) was a Romanian canoe sprinter. She won four medals at the world championships with a silver in 1974 and bronzes in 1973, 1974 and 1975. At the 1972 Olympics she won a bronze medal in the K-2 500 m event and placed sixth in the singles. She is a sister-in-law of the Olympic canoer Maria Ştefan-Mihoreanu.
