= Podjazy =

Village in Kashubia

Podjazy Pòdjazë
- Village
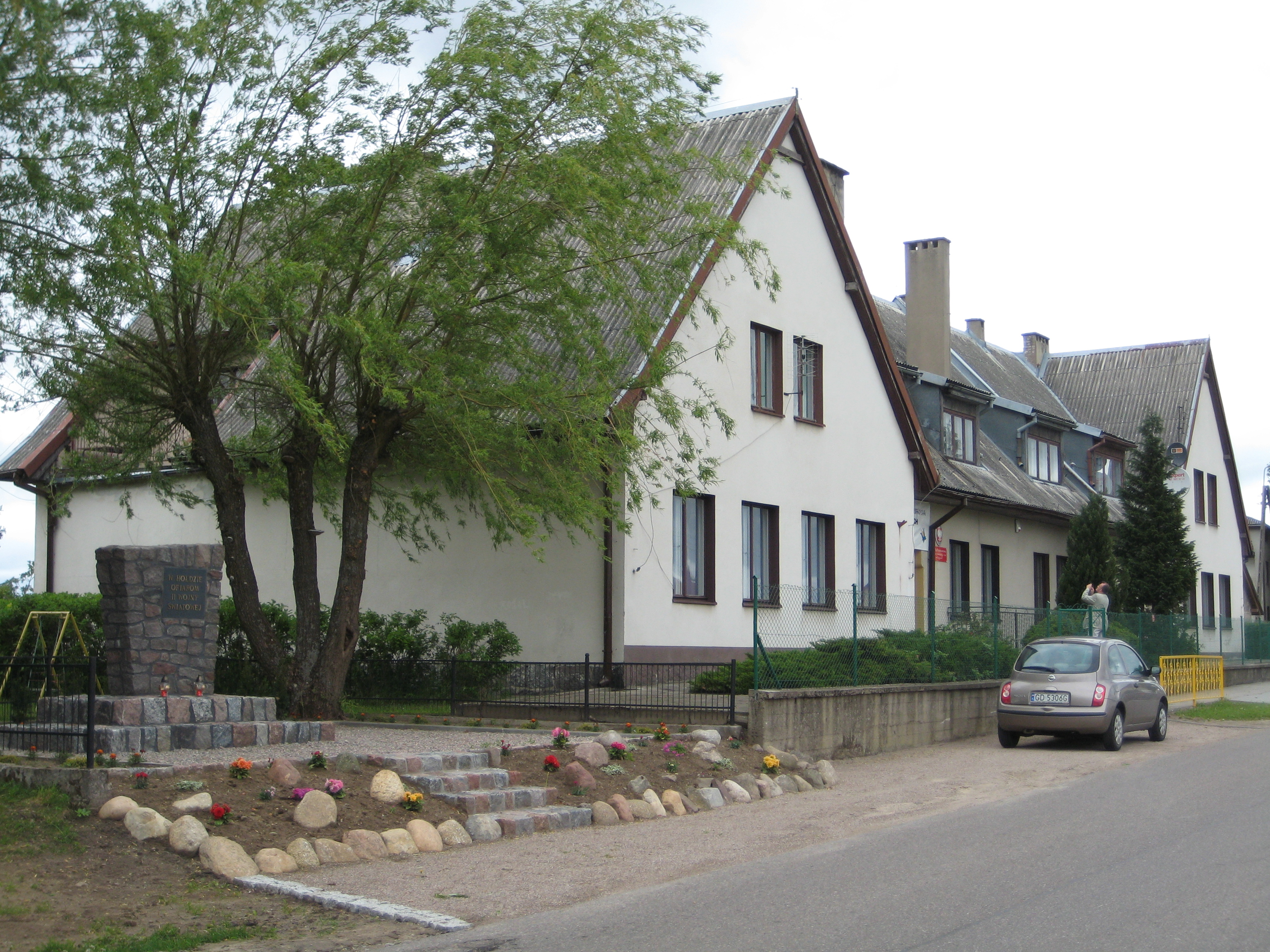
- Grammar school

- Location within Poland
- Coordinates: 54°17′N 17°48′E
- Country: Poland
- Voivodeship: Pomeranian
- County: Kartuzy
- Gmina: Sulęczyno
- Population: 461

Podjazy [pɔdˈjazɨ] (Kashubian: Pòdjazë) is a village in the administrative district of Gmina Sulęczyno, within Kartuzy County, Pomeranian Voivodeship, in northern Poland.

For details of the history of the region, see History of Pomerania.
