= Anna Pfeffer =

Hungarian canoeist (born 1945)

Medal record

Women's canoe sprint

Olympic Games
Silver medal – second place	1968 Mexico City	K-2 500 m
Silver medal – second place	1976 Montreal	K-2 500 m
Bronze medal – third place	1972 Munich	K-1 500 m

World Championships
Gold medal – first place	1971 Belgrade	K-2 500 m
Silver medal – second place	1973 Tampere	K-4 500 m
Bronze medal – third place	1966 East Berlin	K-2 500 m
Bronze medal – third place	1973 Tampere	K-2 500 m

Anna Pfeffer (born 31 August 1945 in Kaposvár) is a Hungarian sprint canoeist who competed from the late 1960s to the late 1970s. She is Jewish.

Competing in three Summer Olympics, she won three medals with two silvers (K-2 500 m: 1968, 1976) and one bronze (1972: K-1 500 m).

Pfeffer also won four medals at the ICF Canoe Sprint World Championships with a gold (K-2 500 m: 1971), a silver (K-4 500 m: 1973), and two bronzes (K-2 500 m: 1966, 1973).
