= Majorie Homer-Dixon =

Canadian canoeist

Majorie Homer-Dixon (born August 10, 1945) is a Canadian sprint kayaker who competed in the late 1960s and early 1970s. Competing in two Summer Olympics, she was eliminated in the semifinals of all three events in which she competed (1968: K-1 500 m, 1972: K-1 500 m, K-2 500 m). She was born in Indochina.
