= Mieke Jaapies =

Dutch sprint canoer (born 1943)

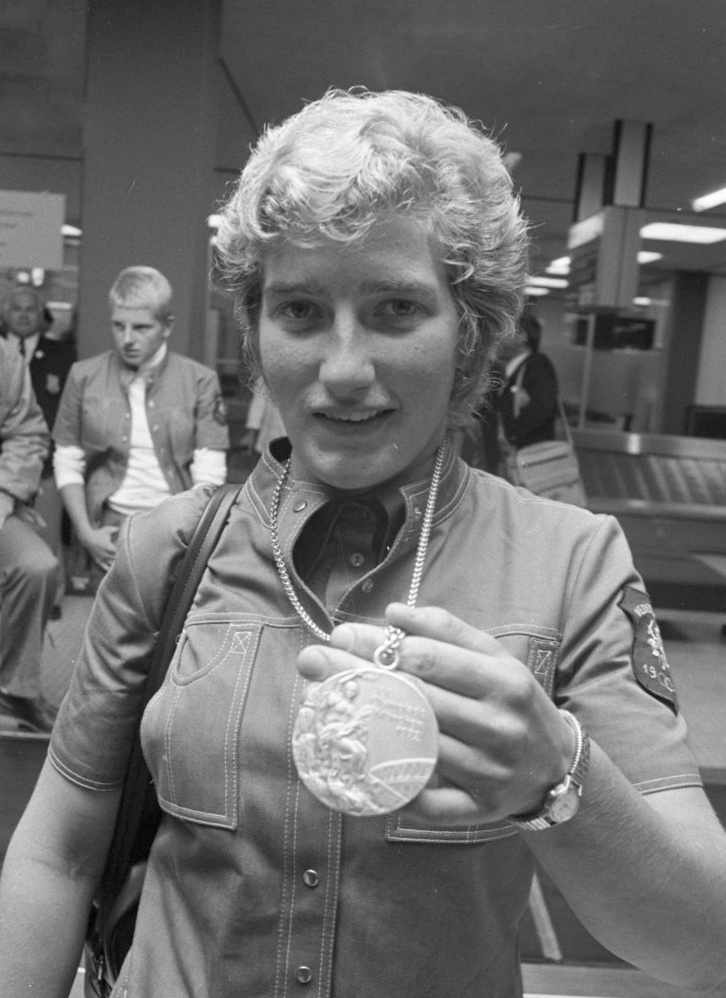
- Mieke Jaapies in 1972

Personal information
- Born: 7 August 1943 (age 82) Wormerveer, the Netherlands
- Height: 1.67 m (5 ft 6 in)
- Weight: 70 kg (154 lb)

Sport
- Sport: Canoe racing
Medal record
Representing the Netherlands
Olympic Games
Silver medal – second place	1972 Munich	K-1 500 m
World Championships
Silver medal – second place	1970 Copenhagen	K-1 500 m
Silver medal – second place	1971 Belgrade	K-1 500 m

Marie ("Mieke") Jaapies (born 7 August 1943) is a Dutch sprint canoer. She competed at the 1968 and 1972 Summer Olympics in 500 m singles and 500 m doubles. She won a silver medal in the singles in 1972 and finished in 6th-8th place in other three events.

Jaapies also won two silver medals in the K-1 500 m event at the ICF Canoe Sprint World Championships, earning them in 1970 and 1971.
