= Kartuzy County =

Kartuzy County Powiat kartuski
- County
- Flag Coat of arms

- Division into gminas
- Coordinates (Kartuzy): 54°20′N 18°12′E
- Country: Poland
- Voivodeship: Pomeranian
- Seat: Kartuzy
- Gminas: Total 8: Gmina Chmielno; Gmina Kartuzy; Gmina Przodkowo; Gmina Sierakowice; Gmina Somonino; Gmina Stężyca; Gmina Sulęczyno; Gmina Żukowo

Area
  - Total: 1,120.04 km^{2} (432.45 sq mi)

Population (2019)
  - Total: 137,942
  - Density: 123.158/km^{2} (318.978/sq mi)
  - Urban: 21,227
  - Rural: 116,715
- Car plates: GKA
- Website: www.kartuskipowiat.com.pl

Kartuzy County (Polish: powiat kartuski; Kashubian: kartësczi pòwiat) is a county in the Pomeranian Voivodeship, Poland, with administrative seat and largest town being Kartuzy.

It came into being on 1 January 1999, as a result of the Polish local government reforms passed in 1998. The only other town in the county is Żukowo. The county covers an area of 1,120.04 square kilometres (432.4 sq mi). As of 2019 its total population is 137,942, out of which the population of Kartuzy is 14,536, that of Żukowo is 6,691, and the rural population is 116,715.

Kartuzy County on a map of the counties of Pomeranian Voivodeship

Kartuzy County is bordered by Wejherowo County to the north, the city of Gdynia to the north-east, the city of Gdańsk and Gdańsk County to the east, Kościerzyna County to the south, Bytów County to the west, and Lębork County to the north-west.

== Administrative divisions ==
The county is subdivided into eight gminas (two urban-rural and six rural). These are listed in the following table, in descending order of population.

Gmina	Type	Area (km^{2})	Population (2019)	Seat
Gmina Żukowo	urban-rural	164.0	39,899	Żukowo
Gmina Kartuzy	urban-rural	205.3	33,914	Kartuzy
Gmina Sierakowice	rural	182.4	19,940	Sierakowice
Gmina Somonino	rural	112.3	10,771	Somonino
Gmina Stężyca	rural	160.3	10,575	Stężyca
Gmina Przodkowo	rural	85.4	9,556	Przodkowo
Gmina Chmielno	rural	79.2	7,767	Chmielno
Gmina Sulęczyno	rural	131.3	5,520	Sulęczyno

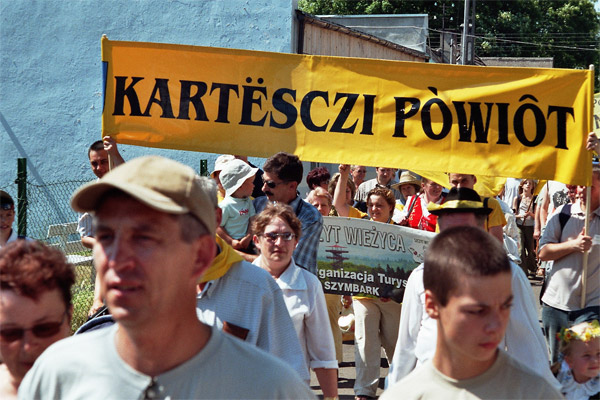
Kashubian jamboree in Łeba in 2005 – banner showing the Kashubian name of Kartuzy County

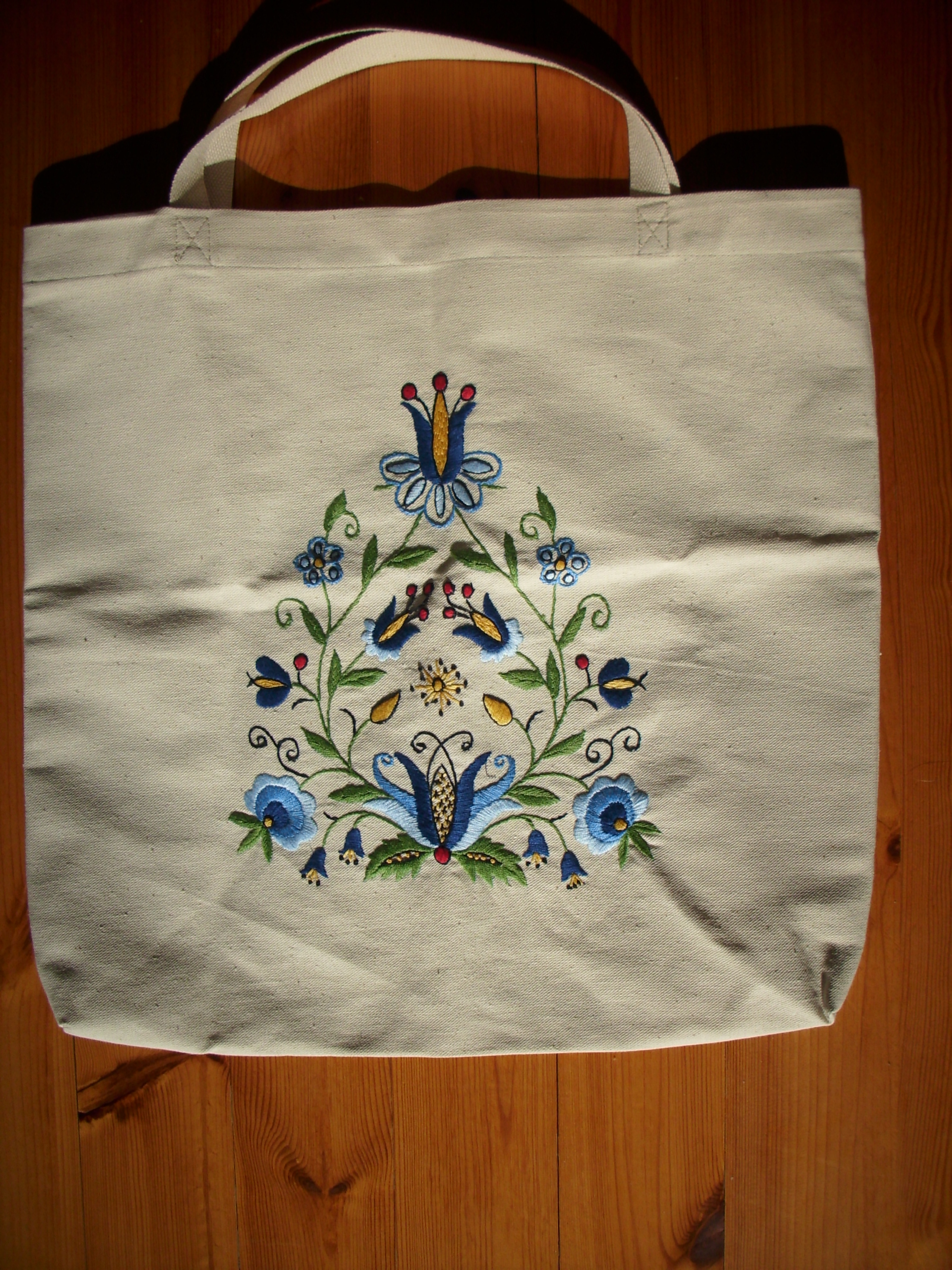
The embroidery of Zukowo school of Kashubian embroidery
