= Canoeing at the 2004 Summer Olympics – Men's C-2 500 metres =

These are the results of the men's C-2 500 metres competition in canoeing at the 2004 Summer Olympics. The C-2 event is raced by two-man sprint canoes.

== Medalists ==
Gold	Silver	Bronze
Meng Guanliang and Yang Wenjun (CHN)	Ibrahim Rojas and Ledis Balceiro (CUB)	Alexander Kostoglod and Aleksandr Kovalyov (RUS)

== Heats ==
The 14 teams first raced in two heats on August 24. The top three finishers from each of the heats advanced directly to the final, and the remaining 8 teams moved on to the semifinal.

Heat	Place	Athlete	Country	Time	Notes
1	1	Christian Gille and Tomasz Wylenzek	Germany	1:40.128	QF
1	2	Attila Buday and Tamas Buday Jr.	Canada	1:40.488	QF
1	3	Paweł Baraszkiewicz and Daniel Jędraszko	Poland	1:40.524	QF
1	4	György Kozmann and György Kolonics	Hungary	1:41.324	QS
1	5	Maksym Prokopenko and Ruslan Dzhalilov	Ukraine	1:44.532	QS
1	6	Peter Páleš and Daniel Biksadsky	Slovakia	1:45.860	QS
1	7	Jordan Malloch and Nathan Johnson	United States	1:48.172	QS
2	1	Meng Guanliang and Yang Wenjun	China	1:38.916	QF
2	2	Ibrahim Rojas and Ledis Balceiro	Cuba	1:39.860	QF
2	3	Alexander Kostoglod and Aleksandr Kovalyov	Russia	1:40.128	QF
2	4	Silviu Simioncencu and Florin Popescu	Romania	1:41.368	QS
2	5	Aliaksandr Kurliandchyk and Aliaksandr Bahdanovich	Belarus	1:41.576	QS
2	6	José Alfredo Bea and David Mascató	Spain	1:43.708	QS
2	7	Yannick Lavigne and Jose Lenoir	France	1:49.940	QS

== Semifinal ==
The top three finishers in the semifinal (raced on August 26) advanced to the final, joining the six teams who had moved directly from the heats. All other teams were eliminated.

1.	Silviu Simioncencu and Florin Popescu (ROU)	1:41.424	QF
2.	György Kozmann and György Kolonics (HUN)	1:41.472	QF
3.	Aliaksandr Kurliandchyk and Aliaksandr Bahdanovich (BLR)	1:42.484	QF
4.	Maksym Prokopenko and Ruslan Dzhalilov (UKR)	1:42.860
5.	José Alfredo Bea and David Mascató (ESP)	1:43.160
6.	Peter Páleš and Daniel Biksadsky (SVK)	1:44.732
7.	Yannick Lavigne and Jose Lenoir (FRA)	1:45.548
8.	Jordan Malloch and Nathan Johnson (USA)	1:46.424

== Final ==
The final was held on August 28.

Gold	Meng Guanliang and Yang Wenjun (CHN)	1:40.278
Silver	Ibrahim Rojas and Ledis Balceiro (CUB)	1:40.350
Bronze	Alexander Kostoglod and Aleksandr Kovalyov (RUS)	1:40.442
4.	Silviu Simioncencu and Florin Popescu (ROU)	1:40.618
5.	Christian Gille and Tomasz Wylenzek (GER)	1:40.802
6.	Aliaksandr Kurliandchyk and Aliaksandr Bahdanovich (BLR)	1:40.858
7.	György Kozmann and György Kolonics (HUN)	1:41.138
8.	Attila Buday and Tamas Buday Jr. (CAN)	1:41.210
9.	Paweł Baraszkiewicz and Daniel Jędraszko (POL)	1:42.046

The Chinese duo had just won their first World Cup races weeks earlier and were only looking to gain experience for the next Summer Olympics in Beijing. The race was so close that race officials could not determine the winners until most of the canoers were out of their boats and the canoes were on the dock.
