= 2016 Hungarian Canoeing Championships =

The 2016 Hungarian Canoeing Championships were the .... edition of the Hungarian Canoeing Championships (Hungarian: Felnőtt és Parakenu Magyar Bajnokság), which took place on 14–16 July 2016 on the Holt-Tisza in Szolnok.

== Results ==
=== Men's events ===
==== Canoe ====
Event	Gold		Silver		Bronze	
C–1 200 m	Jonatán Hajdu (DUNAFERR)	42.730	Péter Nagy (Graboplast Győr)	42.984	Ádám Lantos (Graboplast Győr)	43.004
C–1 500 m	Tamás Kiss (Csepeli KKE)	1:49.514	Ádám Fekete (UTE)	1:50.060	Attila Vajda (EDF Démász)	1:51.374
C–1 1000 m	Tamás Kiss (Csepeli KKE)	4:08.938	Attila Vajda (EDF Démász)	4:11.704	András Dávid Bodonyi (EDF Démász)	4:11.838
C–1 5000 m	Tamás Kiss (Csepeli KKE)	24:04.229	Marcell Androkity (Csepeli KKE)	24:05.856	Bence Balázs Dóri (UTE)	24:22.036
C–2 200 m	Péter Nagy (Graboplast Győr); Ádám Lantos (Graboplast Győr)	42.555	Gábor Széles (Graboplast Győr); Ákos Horváth (Graboplast Győr)	43.609	Levente Gellért Balla (Graboplast Győr); Jenő Kristóf Hajnal (Graboplast Győr)	43.609
C–2 500 m	Dávid Korisánszky (KSI SE); Tamás Ballér (KSI SE)	1:43.969	Ádám Lantos (Graboplast Győr); Patrik Varga (Graboplast Győr)	1:46.743	Richárd Schmidt (UTE); József Duró (UTE)	1:46.863
C–2 1000 m	András Petkó (VVSI-PRO); Ádám Fekete (UTE)	3:53.516	Pál Sarudi (Közgép SE); Dávid Varga (Graboplast Győr)	3:55.316	Patrik Varga (Graboplast Győr); Viktor Viola (DKSC)	3:58.863
C–4 200 m	Graboplast Győr; Gábor Széles; Péter Nagy; Ádám Lantos; Dávid Varga	37.734	Csepeli KKE; Tamás Kiss; Ádám Dóczé; Marcell Androkity; Zoltán Jakus	38.081	KSI SE; Balázs Vörös; Szabolcs Németh (Merkapt-Mekler ITSE); Dávid Korisánszky; Tamás Ballér	38.141
C–4 500 m	Csepeli KKE; Tamás Kiss; Ádám Dóczé; Marcell Androkity; Zoltán Jakus	1:34.814	KSI SE; Péter Nagy (Graboplast Győr); Balázs Vörös; Dávid Korisánszky; Tamás Ballér	1:34.901	UTE; Richárd Schmidt; Bence Balázs Dóri; József Duró; Dávid Lelovics	1:37.828
C–4 1000 m	Csepeli KKE; Ádám Dóczé; Marcell Androkity; Milán Moldován; Zoltán Jakus	3:35.345	UTE; Richárd Schmidt; Bence Balázs Dóri; József Duró; Dávid Lelovics	3:37.611	Graboplast Győr; Gábor Széles; Viktor Viola (DKSC); Levente Gellért Balla; Ákos Horváth	3:40.491

==== Kayak ====
Event	Gold		Silver		Bronze	
K–1 200 m	Sándor Tótka (UTE)	36.872	Balázs Birkás (EDF Démász)	37.705	Péter Molnár (BHSE)	38.718
K–1 500 m	Milán Noé (BHSE)	1:40.982	Csaba Csontos (BHSE)	1:41.155	Viktor Máté Németh (EDF Démász)	1:42.335
K–1 1000 m	Dániel Pauman (Vasas)	3:44.226	László Solti (UKSC)	3:44.672	Bence Nádas (EDF Démász)	3:44.972
K–1 5000 m	Milán Noé (BHSE)	21:37.340	Csaba Csontos (BHSE)	21:38.424	Máté Györgyjakab (UTE)	21:47.134
K–2 200 m	Péter Molnár (BHSE); Sándor Tótka (UTE)	33.132	Márk Balaska (Váci Vasutas); Balázs Birkás (EDF Démász)	33.259	Rudolf Dombi (UTE); Kristóf Tamás Bán (FTC)	34.266
K–2 500 m	Máté Szeiler (FÉMALK BOMBA); Márk Varga (FÉMALK BOMBA)	1:31.190	Szabolcs Majercsik (UTE); Máté Györgyjakab (UTE)	1:31.370	Krisztián Máthé (UTE); Antal Vidákovich (UTE)	1:33.610
K–2 1000 m	Dávid Tóth (Vasas); Tamás Kulifai (Vasas)	3:25.871	Tamás Szalai (Vasas); Zoltán Kammerer (Graboplast Győr)	3:26.071	Róbert Ilyés (BHSE); Mátyás Koleszár (BHSE)	3:26.191
K–4 200 m	Péter Molnár (BHSE); Sándor Tótka (UTE); Márk Balaska (Váci Vasutas); Balázs Birkás (EDF Démász)	30.617	FÉMALK BOMBA; László Kerék; Máté Szeiler; Bálint Hájos; Márk Varga	32.570	FÉMALK BOMBA; Attila Kugler (Vasas); Ábris Rab; Vilmos Fodróczi (Pécs); Zsolt Márk Csontos	33.677
K–4 500 m	FÉMALK BOMBA; Vilmos Fodróczi (Pécs); Máté Szeiler; Bálint Hájos; Márk Varga	1:22.786	UTE; Szabolcs Majercsik; Kristóf Piller; Antal Vidákovich; Máté Györgyjakab	1:23.406	UTE; Buda Varga; Tamás Rónai; Imre Bálint Kalivoda; Marcell Drevenka	1:26.293
K–4 1000 m	BHSE; Róbert Ilyés; Bálint Noé; Bence Nádas (EDF Démász); Mátyás Koleszár	3:05.093	UTE; Buda Varga; Szabolcs Majercsik; Antal Vidákovich; Máté Györgyjakab	3:08.986	MTK; Gergő Márk Luczó; Péter Bálint Freisták; Dominik Varga; Zoltán Kiss	3:12.726

=== Women's events ===
==== Canoe ====
Event	Gold		Silver		Bronze	
C–1 200 m	Kincső Takács (Graboplast Győr)	53.126	Virág Balla (Graboplast Győr)	53.513	Zsanett Lakatos (Graboplast Győr)	53.806
C–1 500 m	Zsanett Lakatos (Graboplast Győr)	2:08.177	Virág Balla (Graboplast Győr)	2:10.030	Kincső Takács (Graboplast Győr)	2:15.003
C–2 500 m	Kincső Takács (Graboplast Győr); Virág Balla (Graboplast Győr)	2:03.999	Rebeka Molnár (Lágymányos); Regina Bonyai (Bajai Vizisport)	2:10.406	Rita Sztolyka (KSI SE); Gabriella Baló (KSI SE)	2:29.053

==== Kayak ====
Event	Gold		Silver		Bronze	
K–1 200 m	Dóra Lucz (UTE)	45.088	Réka Hagymási (BHSE)	45.561	Ágnes Viktória Szabó (KSI SE)	46.374
K–1 500 m	Danuta Kozák (UTE)	1:47.788	Dóra Lucz (UTE)	1:50.808	Tamara Takács (Vasas)	1:51.521
K–1 1000 m	Dóra Lucz (UTE)	4:15.130	Alexandra Enikő Horváth (EDF Démász)	4:15.643	Noémi Horváth (BHSE)	4:17.016
K–1 5000 m	Renáta Csay (Graboplast Győr)	23:25.223	Noémi Horváth (BHSE)	23:25.496	Alexandra Bara (KSI SE)	23:39.263
K–2 200 m	Rita Katrinecz (UTE); Eszter Malcsiner (UTE)	40.166	Anita Hagymási (BHSE); Réka Hagymási (BHSE)	40.279	Edina Csernák (Váci Vasutas); Petra Jeszenszky (MAFC)	43.419
K–2 500 m	Gabriella Szabó (BHSE); Danuta Kozák (UTE)	1:40.116	Rita Katrinecz (UTE); Eszter Malcsiner (UTE)	1:43.383	Réka Hagymási (BHSE); Tamara Takács (Vasas)	1:44.083
K–2 1000 m	Erika Medveczky (KDSE); Alexandra Enikő Horváth (EDF Démász)	3:58.386	Zsófia Metz (UTE); Boróka Braun (UTE)	4:02.786	Petra Gyuricza (Szolnoki Sportcentrum); Anna Kolozsvári (UTE)	4:07.960
K–4 200 m	Péter Molnár (BHSE); Sándor Tótka (UTE); Márk Balaska (Váci Vasutas); Balázs Birkás (EDF Démász)	30.617	FÉMALK BOMBA; László Kerék; Máté Szeiler; Bálint Hájos; Márk Varga	32.570	FÉMALK BOMBA; Attila Kugler (Vasas); Ábris Rab; Vilmos Fodróczi (Pécs); Zsolt Márk Csontos	33.677
K–4 500 m	FÉMALK BOMBA; Vilmos Fodróczi (Pécs); Máté Szeiler; Bálint Hájos; Márk Varga	1:22.786	UTE; Szabolcs Majercsik; Kristóf Piller; Antal Vidákovich; Máté Györgyjakab	1:23.406	UTE; Buda Varga; Tamás Rónai; Imre Bálint Kalivoda; Marcell Drevenka	1:26.293
K–4 1000 m	BHSE; Róbert Ilyés; Bálint Noé; Bence Nádas (EDF Démász); Mátyás Koleszár	3:05.093	UTE; Buda Varga; Szabolcs Majercsik; Antal Vidákovich; Máté Györgyjakab	3:08.986	MTK; Gergő Márk Luczó; Péter Bálint Freisták; Dominik Varga; Zoltán Kiss	3:12.726

== See also ==
- 2018 Hungarian Canoe Sprint Championships
- Hungarian Canoeing Championships
- Hungarian Canoe Federation
