= 2018 Hungarian Canoe Sprint Championships =

- Venue: Szolnoki Kajak-Kenu Pálya (Holt-Tisza)
- Location: Szolnok, Jász-Nagykun-Szolnok
- Dates: 29–31 August

The 2018 Hungarian Canoe Sprint Championships was held in Szolnok, from 29 to 31 August 2018.

== Explanation of events ==
Canoe sprint competitions were contested in either a Canadian canoe (C), an open canoe with a single-blade paddle, or in a kayak (K), a closed canoe with a double-bladed paddle. Each canoe or kayak can hold one person (1), two people (2), or four people (4). For each of the specific canoes or kayaks, such as a K-1 (kayak single), the competition distances can be 200, 500, 1000 or 5000 metres. When a competition is listed as a K-2 500m event, for example, it means two people were in a kayak competing over a distance of 500 metres.

Paracanoe competitions were contested in either a va'a (V), an outrigger canoe (which includes a second pontoon) with a single-blade paddle, or in a kayak (as above). All international competitions were held over 200 metres in single-man boats, with three event classes in both types of vessel for men and women depending on the level of an athlete's impairment. The lower the classification number, the more severe the impairment is - for example, VL1 is a va'a competition for those with particularly severe impairments.

== Medal overview ==
=== Medal table ===
Rank	Team	Gold	Silver	Bronze	Total
1	BHSE	6	4	3	13
2	NKM Szeged	6	3	4	13
3	Mixed teams	4	2	3	9
4	Grapolast Győr	4	2	1	7
5	UTE	3	7	4	14
6	KSI SE	3	5	5	13
7	Dunaferr	3	1	6	10
8	Csepeli KKE	2	3	0	5
9	MTK	1	1	0	2
10	ASE	1	0	1	2
11	Algyő	1	0	0	1
12	Szolnok KKK	0	3	2	5
13	FÉMALK Bomba!-AVSE	0	2	2	4
14	DKSC	0	1	1	2
15	Merkapt-Mekler ITSE	0	1	0	1
16	FTC-Rekontir	0	0	1	1
16	Tiszaújvárosi KKSE	0	0	1	1
16	City-Gas Tiszafüredi KKSE	0	0	1	1
Total		35	35	35	105

- Except for paracanoe events.

=== Men's events ===
==== Canoe (men's) ====
Event	Gold	Time	Silver	Time	Bronze	Time
C-1 200 m	Jonatán Hajdu; Dunaferr	40.935	Dávid Korisánszky; KSI SE	41.668	Balázs Kiss; Dunaferr	41.868
C-1 500 m	András Bodonyi; NKM Szeged	1:48.516	Balázs Kiss; Dunaferr	1:49.110	Ádám Fekete; UTE	1:49.605
C-1 1000 m	András Bodonyi; NKM Szeged	4:07.531	Tamás Kiss; Csepeli KKE	4:10.903	Balázs Kiss; Dunaferr	4:11.825
C-1 5000 m	Ádám Dóczé; Csepeli KKE	20:00.902	Viktor Viola; DKSC	20:06.285	Bence Balázs Dóri; UTE	20:27.274
C-2 200 m	Dunaferr; Jonatán Hajdu; Ádám Slihoczki	39.021	KSI SE; Róbert Mike; Dávid Korisánszky	39.749	Dunaferr; Balázs Kiss; Máté András Kovács	40.399
C-2 500 m	KSI SE; Mátyás Sáfrán; Róbert Mike	1:43.844	Csepeli KKE; Tamás Kiss; Balázs Péter Zupkó	1:44.316	Dunaferr; Balázs Kiss; Ádám Slihoczki	1:44.649
C-2 1000 m	Mixed team Pál Sarudi - Szolnok KKK; András Bodonyi - NKM Szeged	3:48.107	Merkapt-Mekler ITSE; Sebestyén Simon; Dániel Fejes	3:50.513	KSI SE; Mátyás Sáfrán; Tamás Bakó	3:52.240
C-4 200 m	Dunaferr; Jonatán Hajdu; Balázs Kiss; Máté András Kovács; Ádám Slihoczki	29.785	KSI SE; Mátyás Sáfrán; Dávid Korisánszky; Konrád Némedi; Tamás Bakó	37.882	UTE; Viktor Viola - DKSC; Ádám Fekete; Gergely Zoltán Kosznovszki; Yam Eldar	38.243
C-4 500 m	Csepeli KKE; Tamás Kiss; Ádám Dóczé; Zoltán Jakus; Balázs Péter Zupkó	1:37.400	Grapolast Győr; Viktor Viola - DKSC; Áron Sáling; Mihály Áron Takács; Ákos Horváth	1:38.900	Dunaferr; Balázs Kiss; Máté András Kovács; Ádám Slihoczki; Benedek Horváth - Rácalmás	1:38.955
C-4 1000 m	KSI SE; Mátáys Sáfrán; Róbert Mike; Dávid Korisánszky; Tamás Bakó	3:31.118	Csepeli KKE; Tamás Kiss; Ádám Dóczé; Zoltán Jakus; Balázs Péter Zubkó	3:33.991	NKM Szeged; Pál Sarudi - Szolnok KKK; András Bodonyi; Ádám Kocsis; Dominik Zombori	3:34.107

==== Kayak (men's) ====
Event	Gold	Time	Silver	Time	Bronze	Time
K-1 200 m	Sándor Tótka; UTE	34.895	Kolos Attila Csizmadia; FÉMALK Bomba!-AVSE	35.445	Péter Molnár; BHSE	35.550
K-1 500 m	István Kuli; NKM Szeged	1:42.826	Péter István Gál; Szolnok KKK	1:43.137	Zsombor József Noé; Dunaferr	1:43.276
K-1 1000 m	Bálint Kopasz; Algyő	3:39.785	Bence Dombvári; BHSE	3:41.291	Bálint Noé; BHSE	3:42.002
K-1 5000 m	Bálint Noé; BHSE	17:41.875	Csaba Erdőssy; Grapolast Győr	17:43.053	Ádám Petró; FTC-Rekontir	17:54.808
K-2 200 m	NKM Szeged; Bence Nádas; Balázs Birkás	32.687	BHSE; Péter Molnár; Márk Balaska	32.793	FÉMALK Bomba!-AVSE; Kolos Attila Csizmadia; Levente Apagyi	32.932
K-2 500 m	NKM Szeged; Bence Nádas; Balázs Birkás	1:29.107	BHSE; Róbert Ilyés; Bálint Noé	1:29.585	Szolnok KKK; Attila Kugler; Gábor Bogár	1:30.113
K-2 1000 m	Mixed team Sándor Tótka - UTE; Bence Nádas - NKM Szeged	3:19.732	UTE; Dávid Tóth; Tamás Kulifai	3:21.371	Mixed team Gábor Bogár - Szolnok KKK; Zsombor József Noé - Dunafüred	3:21.471
K-4 200 m	BHSE; Péter Molnár; Sándor Tótka - UTE; Márk Balaska; Balázs Birkás - NKM Szeged	29.785	FÉMALK Bomba!-AVSE; Miklós Dudás; Vilmos Fodróczi - Pécs; Kolos Attila Csizmadia; Levente Apagyi	31.457	FÉMALK Bomba!-AVSE; Gergő Havasi; Zsolt Márk Csontos; Márk Kovács; Róbert János Sikter	32.057
K-4 500 m	UTE; Dániel Pauman; Dávid Tóth; Tamás Kulifai; Sándor Tótka	1:20.791	BHSE; Péter Molnár; Márk Balaska; Mátyás Koleszár; Viktor Máté Németh	1:18.573	Szolnok KKK; Attila Kugler; Gábor Bogár; Péter István Gál; Zsombor József Noé - Dunafüred	1:19.939
K-4 1000 m	UTE; Zoltán Kammerer - Grapolast Győr; Dániel Pauman; Dávid Tóth; Tamás Kulifai	3:01.221	Szolnok KKK; Attila Kugler; Gábor Bogár; Ákos Gacsal - Grapolast Győr; Zsombor József Noé - Dunafüred	3:01.460	BHSE; Benjámin Ceiner; Róbert Ilyés; Bálint Noé; Mátyás Koleszár	3:04.499

=== Women's events ===
==== Canoe (women's) ====
Event	Gold	Time	Silver	Time	Bronze	Time
C-1 200 m	Kincső Takács; Grapolast Győr	48.223	Zsanett Lakatos; UTE	49.390	Bianka Nagy; NKM Szeged	50.273
C-1 500 m	Virág Balla; Grapolast Győr	2:09.171	Zsanett Lakatos; UTE	2:10.266	Bianka Nagy; NKM Szeged	2:12.327
C-1 5000 m	Virág Balla; Grapolast Győr	22:39.906	Zsanett Lakatos; UTE	22:42.928	Giada Bragato; Tiszaújvárosi KKSE	24:20.372
C-2 200 m	Grapolast Győr; Kincső Takács; Virág Balla	47.091	NKM Szeged; Bianka Nagy; Csenge Molnár	48.491	Mixed team Laura Sáling - Grapolast Győr; Rebeka Molnár - Lágymányos	50.541
C-2 500 m	Mixed team Kincső Takács - Grapolast Győr; Bianka Nagy - NKM Szeged	1:43.844	Mixed team Virág Balla - Grapolast Győr; Csenge Molnár - NKM Szeged	1:44.316	Mixed team Giada Bragato - Tiszaújvárosi KKSE; Zsófia Kisbán - Lágymányos	1:44.649

==== Kayak (women's) ====
Event	Gold	Time	Silver	Time	Bronze	Time
K-1 200 m	Réka Hagymási; BHSE	41.728	Anna Kárász; NKM Szeged	42.351	Adrienn Orosz; DKSC	42.828
K-1 500 m	Anna Kárász; NKM Szeged	1:56.040	Dóra Bodonyi; Szolnok KKK	1:56.940	Noémi Pupp; ASE	1:58.079
K-1 1000 m	Noémi Pupp; ASE	4:10.500	Anna Kárász; NKM Szeged	4:16.072	Alexandra Bara; KSI SE	4:16.922
K-1 5000 m	Alexandra Bara; KSI SE	20:00.290	Szilvia Somogyi; MTK	20:00.301	Petra Sára Kovács; Grapolast Győr	20:18.945
K-2 200 m	BHSE; Erika Medveczky; Réka Hagymási	38.411	UTE; Rita Katrinecz; Anna Lucz	38.656	UTE; Dóra Lucz; Zsófia Szénási	39.778
K-2 500 m	Mixed team Erika Medveczky - BHSE; Noémi Pupp - ASE	1:40.741	Mixed team Dóra Bodonyi - Szolnok KKK; Alida Dóra Gazsó - KSI SE	1:40.963	KSI SE; Alexandra Bara; Lilla Katalin Szendy	1:49.992
K-2 1000 m	MTK; Szilvia Somogyi; Zsófia Potoniec	3:57.095	KSI SE; Alexandra Bara; Lilla Katalin Szendy	4:02.517	City-Gas Tiszafüredi KKSE; Fanni Fülöp; Adriána Fülöp	4:16.984
K-4 200 m	BHSE; Erika Medveczky; Réka Hagymási; Noémi Pupp - ASE; Lisa-Maria Gamsjager	37.230	UTE; Rita Katrinecz; Eszter Malcsiner; Blanka Kiss; Anna Lucz	37.258	KSI SE; Ágnes Szabó; Fruzsina Racskó; Alida Dóra Gazsó; Karina Klaudia Biben	37.797
K-4 500 m	BHSE; Erika Medveczky; Réka Hagymási; Tamara Takács - Vasas; Noémi Pupp - ASE	1:35.012	UTE; Dóra Lucz; Dóra Bodonyi - Szolnok KKK; Zsófia Szénási; Anna Lucz	1:36.628	KSI SE; Ágnes Szabó; Fruzsina Racskó; Alida Dóra Gazsó; Karina Klaudia Biben	1:36.934
K-4 1000 m	BHSE; Erika Medveczky; Réka Hagymási; Noémi Pupp - ASE; Lisa-Maria Gamsjager	3:30.042	KSI SE; Ágnes Szabó; Fruzsina Racskó; Alida Dóra Gazsó; Karina Klaudia Biben	3:33.647	NKM Szeged; Alexandra Enikő Horváth; Anna Kárász; Eszter Verbőczi; Dorottya Zsóka Árok	3:33.881

== Paracanoe ==
=== Medal events ===
Event	Gold	Time	Silver	Time	Bronze	Time
Men's K-1 200m A	Róbert Suba; NKM Szeged	49.488	Tamás Juhász; BHSE	51.643	Péter Pál Kiss; BHSE	57.521
Men's K-1 200 m TA	András Rozbora; BHSE	52.788	Bence András Pál; FÉMALK Bomba!-AVSE	1:02.788	Csaba Rescsik; NKM Szeged	1:15.160
Men's K-1 200 m LTA	Erik Kiss; City-Gas Tiszafüredi KKSE	47.064	Dávid Török; Grapolast Győr	49.775	Zoltán Katona; Szolnoki Sportcentrum	49.492
Men's V-1 200m TA	Tamás Juhász; BHSE	56.992	Róbert Suba; NKM Szeged	57.265		
Men's V-1 200 m LTA	Máté Szomszéd; Grapolast Győr	59.276	Imre Rigó; Szolnoki Sportcentrum	1:02.687	Erik Kiss; City-Gas Tiszafüredi KKSE	1:09.659
Women's K-1 200 m TA	Katalin Eszter Varga; NKM Szeged	53.756				
Women's K-1 200 m LTA	Annamária Fehér; Szolnoki Sportcentrum	1:01.884	Nikoletta Molnár; FÉMALK Bomba!-AVSE	1:02.251	Sarolta Deák; GANZ	1:11.017
Women's V-1 200 m LTA	Katalin Eszter Varga; NKM Szeged	1:14.761	Julianna Molnárné Tóth; BHSE	1:15.600	Annamária Fehér; Szolnoki Sportcentrum	1:22.800

== See also ==
- 2016 Hungarian Canoeing Championships
- Hungarian Canoe Sprint Championships
- Hungarian Canoe Federation
