= Budapesti Honvéd SE (canoeing) =

Canoeing team in Budapest, Hungary

Budapesti Honvéd SE is a canoeing team based in Budapest, Hungary. Bp. Honvéd's canoeing section is composed of men and women teams.

== International success ==
=== Olympic medalists ===
The team's olympic medalists are shown below.

Games	Medal	Category	Name
(Finland) 1952 Helsinki	Bronze	Men's K-2 10 000 m	József Gurovits - Ferenc Varga
(Australia) 1956 Melbourne	Silver	Men's C-1 1000 m	István Hernek
(Australia) 1956 Melbourne	Bronze	Men's C-2 10 000 m	Imre Farkas, József Hunics
(Italy) 1960 Rome	Bronze	Men's C-2 1000 m	András Törő - I. Farkas
1968 Mexico City	Silver	Men's C-2 1000 m	Gyula Petrikovics - T. Wichmann
(Canada) 1976 Montreal	Bronze	Men's C-2 500 m	Tamás Buday, Oszkár Frey
(Canada) 1976 Montreal	Bronze	Men's C-2 1000 m	Tamás Buday, Oszkár Frey
(Canada) 1976 Montreal	Bronze	Men's K-2 1000 m	Zoltán Bakó - I. Szabó
(Soviet Union) 1980 Moscow	Gold	Men's C-2 500 m	István Vaskuti - L. Foltán
(South Korea) 1988 Seoul	Gold	Men's K-1 500 m	Zsolt Gyulay
(South Korea) 1988 Seoul	Gold	Men's K-4 1000 m	Zsolt Gyulay, Ferenc Csipes, Sándor Hódosi, Attila Ábrahám
(South Korea) 1988 Seoul	Bronze	Men's K-2 500 m	Attila Ábrahám, Ferenc Csipes
(Spain) 1992 Barcelona	Silver	Men's K-1 500 m	Zsolt Gyulay
(Spain) 1992 Barcelona	Silver	Men's K-4 1000 m	Ferenc Csipes, Zsolt Gyulay, Attila Ábrahám - L. Fidel
(United States) 1996 Atlanta	Silver	Men's K-4 1000 m	Gábor Horváth, Ferenc Csipes - A. Rajna, A. Adrovicz
(United States) 1996 Atlanta	Bronze	Men's C-1 500 m	Imre Pulai
(Australia) 2000 Sydney	Gold	Men's C-2 500 m	Ferenc Novák - I. Pulai
(Australia) 2000 Sydney	Gold	Men's K-4 1000 m	Gábor Horváth - Á. Vereckei, Z. Kammerer, B. Storcz
(Greece) 2004 Athens	Gold	Men's K-4 1000 m	Ákos Vereckei, Gábor Horváth - Z. Kammerer, B. Storcz
(China) 2008 Beijing	Silver	Women's K-4 500 m	Gabriella Szabó, Danuta Kozák - K. Kovács, N. Janics
(United Kingdom) 2012 London	Gold	Women's K-1 500 m	Danuta Kozák
(United Kingdom) 2012 London	Gold	Women's K-4 500 m	Gabriella Szabó, Danuta Kozák, Katalin Kovács - K. Fazekas-Zur
(United Kingdom) 2012 London	Silver	Women's K-2 500 m	Katalin Kovács - N. Janics
(Brazil) 2016 Rio de Janeiro	Gold	Women's K-2 500 m	Gabriella Szabó - D. Kozák
(Brazil) 2016 Rio de Janeiro	Gold	Women's K-4 500 m	Gabriella Szabó, Tamara Csipes - D. Kozák, K. Fazekas-Zur

=== World Championships ===
Year	Category	Name
1997	Men's K-1 200 m	Vince Fehérvári
1997	Men's K-2 200 m	Vince Fehérvári, Róbert Hegedűs
1997	Men's K-4 500 m	Róbert Hegedűs - Z. Kammerer, B. Storcz, Á. Vereckei
1998	Men's K-2 200 m	Vince Fehérvári, Róbert Hegedűs
1998	Men's K-4 200 m	Vince Fehérvári, István Beé, Róbert Hegedűs - Gy. Kajner
1999	Men's K-2 200 m	Vince Fehérvári, Róbert Hegedűs
1999	Men's K-4 200 m	Vince Fehérvári, István Beé, Róbert Hegedűs - Gy. Kajner
1999	Men's K-4 1000 m	Gábor Horváth - B. Storcz, Z. Kammerer, Á. Vereckei
2001	Men's K-4 200 m	István Beé - V. Fehérvári, R. Hegedűs, Gy. Kajner
2005	Men's K-4 200 m	István Beé - V. Kadler, B. Babella, G. Gyertyános
2005	Men's K-2 1000 m	Roland Kökény, Gábor Kucsera
2006	Men's K-2 1000 m	Gábor Kucsera - Z. Kammerer
2006	Men's K-4 1000 m	Ákos Vereckei, Roland Kökény, Gábor Horváth: L. Gyökös
2007	Men's K-4 200 m	István Beé - V. Kadler, G. Boros, B. Babella
2007	Women's K-4 1000 m	Alexandra Keresztesi - T. Paksy, K. Fazekas, D. Benedek
2009	Women's K-2 200 m	Katalin Kovács - N. Janics
2009	Women's K-1 500 m	Katalin Kovács
2009	Women's K-2 500 m	Danuta Kozák, Gabriella Szabó
2009	Women's K-4 500 m	Danuta Kozák, Katalin Kovács - D. Benedek, N. Janics
2009	Women's K-1 1000 m	Katalin Kovács
2010	Women's K-2 200 m	Katalin Kovács - N. Janics
2010	Women's K-2 500 m	Gabriella Szabó, Danuta Kozák
2010	Women's K-4 500 m	Tamara Csipes, Katalin Kovács - N. Janics, D. Benedek
2010	Women's K-2 1000 m	Gabriella Szabó, Tamara Csipes
2011	Women's K-2 200 m	Katalin Kovács, Danuta Kozák
2011	Women's K-4 500 m	Gabriella Szabó, Danuta Kozák, Katalin Kovács: D. Benedek
2011	Women's K-1 1000 m	Tamara Csipes
2011	Women's K-1 5000 m	Tamara Csipes
2013	Women's K-4 500 m	Gabriella Szabó - D. Kozák, K. Fazekas-Zur, N. Vad
2013	Women's K-2 1000 m	Gabriella Szabó - K. Fazekas-Zur
2014	Women's K-2 500 m	Gabriella Szabó, Tamara Csipes
2014	Women's K-4 500 m	Gabriella Szabó - A. Kárász, D. Kozák, N. Vad
2015	Women's K-2 500 m	Gabriella Szabó - D. Kozák

=== European Championships ===
Year	Category	Name
2001	Men's K-4 200 m	Gábor Horváth, Róbert Hegedűs, Vince Fehérvári, István Beé
2001	Men's K-1 500 m	Ákos Vereckei
2002	Men's K-1 500 m	Ákos Vereckei
2004	Men's K-4 500 m	Roland Kökény, István Beé - Z. Benkő, G. Kucsera
2004	Men's K-4 1000 m	Ákos Vereckei, Gábor Horváth - B. Storcz, Z. Kammerer
2005	Men's K-4 200 m	István Beé - G. Gyertyános, B. Babella, V. Kadler
2005	Men's K-1 500 m	Ákos Vereckei
2011	Women's K-1 500 m	Danuta Kozák
2011	Women's K-1 1000 m	Katalin Kovács
2011	Women's K-2 200 m	Danuta Kozák, Katalin Kovács
2011	Women's K-2 500 m	Tamara Csipes, Katalin Kovács
2011	Women's K-2 1000 m	Tamara Csipes, Gabriella Szabó
2014	Women's K-1 1000 m	Tamara Csipes
2014	Women's K-2 500 m	Gabriella Szabó, Tamara Csipes
2014	Women's K-4 500 m	Gabriella Szabó
