= Újpesti TE (canoeing) =

Canoeing club in Budapest, Hungary

- Founded: 1951
- Based in: Budapest, Hungary
- Colors: purple and white
- President: István Őze
- Head coach: Gergő Doma
- Website: kajak-kenu.ute1885.hu

The Újpesti TE (canoe-kayak section) was created in 1951 and is one of the most successful canoe-kayak teams in Hungary.

== Honours ==
=== Olympic medalists ===
The team's olympic medalists are shown below.

Games	Medal	Category	Name
(Finland) 1952 Helsinki	Bronze	Men's K-2 10 000 m	Ferenc Varga - J. Gurovits
(Australia) 1956 Melbourne	Gold	Men's K-2 10 000 m	János Urányi, László Fábián
(Italy) 1960 Rome	Silver	Men's K-1 1000 m	Imre Szöllősi
(Italy) 1960 Rome	Silver	Men's K-1 4x500 m	Imre Szöllősi - I. Kemecsey, A. Szente, Gy. Mészáros
(Italy) 1960 Rome	Bronze	Women's K-2 500 m	Klára Bánfalvi - V. Egresi
1968 Mexico City	Silver	Men's K-2 1000 m	István Timár - Cs. Giczy
1968 Mexico City	Silver	Women's K-2 500 m	Katalin Rozsnyói - A. Pfeffer
1968 Mexico City	Bronze	Men's K-4 1000 m	Imre Szöllősi, István Timár - Cs. Giczy, I. Csizmadia
(Soviet Union) 1980 Moscow	Bronze	Women's K-2 500 m	Mária Zakariás - É. Rakusz
(South Korea) 1988 Seoul	Silver	Women's K-4 500 m	Erika Mészáros - E. Géczi, É. Rakusz, R. Kőbán
(Spain) 1992 Barcelona	Gold	Women's K-4 500 m	Éva Dónusz, Erika Mészáros, Kinga Czigány - R. Kőbán
(Spain) 1992 Barcelona	Bronze	Women's K-2 500 m	Éva Dónusz - R. Kőbán
(United States) 1996 Atlanta	Silver	Men's K-4 1000 m	Attila Adrovicz - A. Rajna, G. Horváth, F. Csipes
(Australia) 2000 Sydney	Silver	Men's K-2 500 m	Katalin Kovács - Sz. Szabó
(Australia) 2000 Sydney	Silver	Women's K-4 500 m	Rita Kőbán, Katalin Kovács - Sz. Szabó, E. Viski
(Brazil) 2016 Rio de Janeiro	Gold	Women's K-1 500 m	Danuta Kozák
(Brazil) 2016 Rio de Janeiro	Gold	Women's K-2 500 m	Danuta Kozák - G. Szabó
(Brazil) 2016 Rio de Janeiro	Gold	Women's K-4 500 m	Danuta Kozák - G. Szabó, T. Csipes, K. Fazekas-Zur

=== World Championships ===
Year	Category	Name
1958	Men's K-2 1000 m	László Fábián, János Urányi
1963	Men's K-2 10000 m	László Fábián, István Tímár
1963	Men's K-4 10000 m	László Fábián, István Tímár, László Ürögi - O. Koltay
1966	Men's K-2 10000 m	László Fábián, Imre Szöllősi
1975	Men's K-1 4x500 m	Péter Várhelyi - I. Herczeg, J. Svidró, Z. Sztanity
1985	Men's K-4 10000 m	Zoltán Böjti - T. Helyi, Z. Kovács, K. Petrovics
1986	Women's K-2 500 m	Erika Mészáros - K. Povázsán
1986	Women's K-4 500 m	Erika Mészáros - R. Kőbán, É. Rakusz, E. Géczi
1994	Women's K-2 200 m	Éva Laky - R. Kőbán
1994	Women's K-4 200 m	Éva Laky - É. Dónusz, Sz. Mednyánszky, R. Kőbán
1998	Women's K-4 200 m	Erzsébet Viski, Rita Kőbán, Katalin Kovács - K. Dékány
1999	Women's K-4 200 m	Katalin Kovács, Rita Kőbán - Sz. Szabó, E. Viski
1999	Women's K-4 500 m	Katalin Kovács, Rita Kőbán - Sz. Szabó, E. Viski
2005	Men's K-4 200 m	Gergely Gyertyános - B. Babella, I. Beé, V. Kadler
2013	Women's K-1 500 m	Danuta Kozák
2013	Women's K-4 500 m	Danuta Kozák - G. Szabó, K. Fazekas-Zur, N. Vad
2013	Women's K-1 4x200 m	Danuta Kozák - N. Vad, N. Dusev-Janics, K. Fazekas-Zur
2014	Women's K-1 500 m	Danuta Kozák
2014	Women's K-4 500 m	Danuta Kozák - A. Kárász, G. Szabó, N. Vad
2014	Men's K-1 4x200 m	Bence Nádas - M. Dudás, D. Hérics, S. Tótka
2015	Men's K-2 200 m	Sándor Tótka - P. Molnár
2015	Women's K-2 500 m	Danuta Kozák - G. Szabó

=== European Championships ===
Year	Category	Name
1957	Men's K-2 500 m	László Fábián, János Urányi
1959	Men's K-1 1000 m	Imre Szöllősi
1959	Men's K-2 10000 m	Imre Szöllősi - J. Petróczy
1961	Men's K-2 1000 m	László Fábián, Imre Szöllősi
1961	Men's K-2 10000 m	László Fábián, Imre Szöllősi
1961	Men's K-4 10000 m	András Sován, László Ürögi - Gy. Czink, J. Petróczy
1963	Men's K-2 10000 m	László Fábián, István Tímár
1963	Men's K-4 10000 m	László Fábián, István Tímár, László Ürögi - O. Koltay
1965	Men's K-1 10000 m	László Ürögi
1965	Men's K-2 10000 m	László Fábián, Imre Szöllősi
1967	Men's K-2 10000 m	László Fábián - I. Kemecsei
1969	Men's K-2 10000 m	István Tímár - G. Csapó
1999	Women's K-4 500 m	Kinga Bóta, Katalin Kovács - Sz. Szabó, E. Viski
2000	Women's K-1 200 m	Rita Kőbán
2000	Women's K-4 200 m	Katalin Kovács, Rita Kőbán - Sz. Szabó, E. Viski
2000	Women's K-1 500 m	Rita Kőbán
2005	Men's K-4 200 m	Gergely Gyertyános - B. Babella, I. Beé, V. Kadler
2013	Women's K-4 500 m	Danuta Kozák - A. Kárász, K. Kovács, N. Dusev-Janics
2014	Women's K-1 200 m	Danuta Kozák
2014	Women's K-1 500 m	Danuta Kozák
2014	Women's K-4 500 m	Danuta Kozák - G. Szabó, A. Kárász, N. Vad
2016	Women's K-1 500 m	Danuta Kozák
2016	Women's K-2 500 m	Danuta Kozák - G. Szabó
2016	Men's K-4 500 m	Sándor Tótka - B. Nádas, P. Molnár, T. Somorácz
2016	Women's K-4 500 m	Danuta Kozák - G. Szabó, T. Csipes, K. Fazekas-Zur
2017	Women's K-1 200 m	Dóra Lucz
2017	Men's K-2 500 m	Sándor Tótka - B. Nádas
2017	Women's K-4 500 m	Dóra Lucz - T. Takács, E. Medveczky, N. Vad
2017	Men's K-4 500 m	Sándor Tótka - B. Nádas, P. Molnár, M. Mozgi
