= Canoeing at the 2004 Summer Olympics – Men's C-2 1000 metres =

These are the results of the men's C-2 1000 metres competition in canoeing at the 2004 Summer Olympics. The C-2 event is raced by two-man sprint canoes.

== Medalists ==
Gold	Silver	Bronze
Christian Gille and Tomasz Wylenzek (GER)	Aleksandr Kostoglod and Aleksandr Kovalyov (RUS)	György Kozmann and György Kolonics (HUN)

== Heats ==
The 14 teams first raced in two heats. The top three finishers from each of the heats advanced directly to the final, and the remaining 8 teams moved on to the semifinal. The heats were raced on August 23, 2004.

Heat	Place	Athlete	Country	Time	Notes
1	1	Silviu Simioncencu and Florin Popescu	Romania	3:30.419	QF
1	2	Ibrahim Rojas and Ledis Balceiro	Cuba	3:30.435	QF
1	3	Michał Śliwiński and Łukasz Woszczyński	Poland	3:30.607	QF
1	4	Richard Dalton and Michael Scarola	Canada	3:31.123	QS
1	5	Meng Guanliang and Yang Wenjun	China	3:31.795	QS
1	6	Peter Páleš and Daniel Biksadsky	Slovakia	3:47.263	QS
1	7	Jordan Malloch and Nathan Johnson	United States	3:50.735	QS
2	1	Christian Gille and Tomasz Wylenzek	Germany	3:30.059	QF
2	2	Alexander Kostoglod and Aleksandr Kovalyov	Russia	3:31.023	QF
2	3	György Kozmann and György Kolonics	Hungary	3:31.775	QF
2	4	José Alfredo Bea and David Mascató	Spain	3:32.355	QS
2	5	Yannick Lavigne and Jose Lenoir	France	3:35.939	QS
2	6	Maksym Prokopenko and Ruslan Dzhalilov	Ukraine	3:36.075	QS
2	7	Aliaksandr Kurliandchyk and Aliaksandr Bahdanovich	Belarus	3:38.391	QS

== Semifinal ==
The top three finishers in the semifinal advanced to the final, joining the six teams who had moved directly from the heats. All other teams were eliminated. The semifinals were raced on August 25, 2004.

1.	José Alfredo Bea and David Mascató (ESP)	3:31.876	QF
2.	Richard Dalton and Michael Scarola (CAN)	3:32.280	QF
3.	Meng Guanliang and Yang Wenjun (CHN)	3:32.792	QF
4.	Aliaksandr Kurliandchyk and Aliaksandr Bahdanovich (BLR)	3:33.588
5.	Yannick Lavigne and Jose Lenoir (FRA)	3:35.232
6.	Maksym Prokopenko and Ruslan Dzhalilov (UKR)	3:35.740
7.	Peter Páleš and Daniel Biksadsky (SVK)	3:36.572
8.	Jordan Malloch and Nathan Johnson (USA)	3:46.036

== Final ==
The final was raced on August 27, 2004.

Gold	Christian Gille and Tomasz Wylenzek (GER)	3:41.802
Silver	Alexander Kostoglod and Aleksandr Kovalyov (RUS)	3:42.990
Bronze	György Kozmann and György Kolonics (HUN)	3:43.106
4.	Silviu Simioncencu and Florin Popescu (ROU)	3:43.858
5.	Michał Śliwiński and Łukasz Woszczyński (POL)	3:44.338
6.	Richard Dalton and Michael Scarola (CAN)	3:45.638
7.	José Alfredo Bea and David Mascató (ESP)	3:45.766
8.	Ibrahim Rojas and Ledis Balceiro (CUB)	3:50.346
9.	Meng Guanliang and Yang Wenjun (CHN)	3:52.926
