= Bulgaria at the 2008 Summer Olympics =

- IOC code: BUL
- NOC: Bulgarian Olympic Committee
- Website: www.bgolympic.org (in Bulgarian and English)

in Beijing
- Competitors: 70 in 14 sports
- Flag bearers: Petar Stoychev (opening); Matey Kaziyski (closing)
- Medals Ranked 42nd: Gold 1 Silver 1 Bronze 3 Total 5

Summer Olympics appearances (overview)
- 1896; 1900–1920; 1924; 1928; 1932; 1936; 1948; 1952; 1956; 1960; 1964; 1968; 1972; 1976; 1980; 1984; 1988; 1992; 1996; 2000; 2004; 2008; 2012; 2016; 2020; 2024; 2028

Bulgaria was represented at the 2008 Summer Olympics in Beijing, China by the Bulgarian Olympic Committee.

In total, 70 athletes including 43 men and 27 women represented Bulgaria in 14 different sports including archery, athletics, badminton, boxing, canoeing, cycling, gymnastics, rowing, sailing, shooting, swimming, tennis, volleyball and wrestling.

Bulgaria won a total five medals at the games including one gold in the rowing events and one silver and three bronze in the wrestling events.

== Competitors ==
In total, 70 athletes represented Bulgaria at the 2008 Summer Olympics in Beijing, China across 14 different sports.

Sport	Men	Women	Total
Archery	1	0	1
Athletics	7	10	17
Badminton	0	1	1
Boxing	2	–	2
Canoeing	2	0	2
Cycling	2	0	2
Gymnastics	1	9	10
Rowing	2	1	3
Sailing	0	1	1
Shooting	1	3	4
Swimming	3	1	4
Tennis	0	1	1
Volleyball	12	0	12
Wrestling	10	2	12
Total	43	27	70

== Medalists ==
Bulgaria won a total of five medals at the games including one gold, one silver and three bronze.

Medal	Name	Sport	Event
Gold	Rumyana Neykova	Rowing	Women's single sculls
Silver	Stanka Zlateva	Wrestling	Women's freestyle 72 kg
Bronze	Yavor Yanakiev	Wrestling	Men's Greco-Roman 74 kg
Bronze	Radoslav Velikov	Wrestling	Men's freestyle 55 kg
Bronze	Kiril Terziev	Wrestling	Men's freestyle 74 kg

== Archery ==
In total, one Bulgarian athlete participated in the archery events – Daniel Pavlov in the men's individual.

Athlete	Event	Ranking round		Round of 64	Round of 32	Round of 16	Quarterfinals	Semifinals	Final / BM	
Athlete	Event	Score	Seed	Opposition Score	Opposition Score	Opposition Score	Opposition Score	Opposition Score	Opposition Score	Rank
Daniel Pavlov	Men's individual	618	59	Tsyrempilov (RUS) (6); L 102–112	Did not advance					

== Athletics ==
In total, 17 Bulgarian athletes participated in the athletics events – Nikolay Atanasov, Spas Bukhalov, Gita Dodova, Iliyan Efremov, Inna Eftimova, Venera Getova, Desislav Gunev, Georgi Ivanov, Momchil Karailiev, Rumyana Karapetrova, Tsvetelina Kirilova, Ivet Lalova, Tezdzhan Naimova, Kolyo Neshev, Dobrinka Shalamanova and Daniela Yordanova.

Men
Track & road events

Athlete	Event	Heat		Quarterfinal		Semifinal		Final	
Athlete	Event	Result	Rank	Result	Rank	Result	Rank	Result	Rank
Desislav Gunev	100 m	10.66	6	Did not advance					
Desislav Gunev	200 m	21.55	6	Did not advance					

Field events

Athlete	Event	Qualification		Final	
Athlete	Event	Distance	Position	Distance	Position
Nikolay Atanasov	Long jump	7.54	35	Did not advance	
Spas Bukhalov	Pole vault	5.45	=25	Did not advance	
Iliyan Efremov	Pole vault	NM	—	Did not advance	
Georgi Ivanov	Shot put	NM	—	Did not advance	
Momchil Karailiev	Triple jump	17.12	11 Q	16.48	11
Kolyo Neshev	Javelin throw	66.00	36	Did not advance	

Women
Track & road events

Athlete	Event	Heat		Quarterfinal		Semifinal		Final	
Athlete	Event	Result	Rank	Result	Rank	Result	Rank	Result	Rank
Inna Eftimova	100 m	11.67	4	Did not advance					
Inna Eftimova	200 m	23.50	5 Q	23.48	8	Did not advance			
Tsvetelina Kirilova	400 m hurdles	55.22	3 Q	—N/a		55.97	8	Did not advance	
Ivet Lalova	100 m	11.33	1 Q	11.40	3 Q	11.51	7	Did not advance	
Ivet Lalova	200 m	23.13	5 Q	23.15	4	Did not advance			
Tezdzhan Naimova	100 m	11.70	5	Did not advance					
Dobrinka Shalamanova	3000 m steeplechase	DNF		—N/a				Did not advance	
Daniela Yordanova	1500 m	Withdrew for failing the drug test*							

* On 13 June 2008, Daniela Yordanova was tested positive for testosterone in an out-of-competition doping test in Sofia.

Field events

Athlete	Event	Qualification		Final	
Athlete	Event	Distance	Position	Distance	Position
Gita Dodova	Triple jump	13.53	25	Did not advance	
Venera Getova	Discus throw	54.00	34	Did not advance	
Rumyana Karapetrova	Javelin throw	40.15	52	Did not advance	

== Badminton ==
In total, one Bulgarian athlete participated in the badminton events – Petya Nedelcheva in the women's singles.

Athlete	Event	Round of 64	Round of 32	Round of 16	Quarterfinal	Semifinal	Final / BM	
Athlete	Event	Opposition Score	Opposition Score	Opposition Score	Opposition Score	Opposition Score	Opposition Score	Rank
Petya Nedelcheva	Women's singles	Persson (SWE); W 21–10, 21–10	Hosny (EGY); W 21–7, 21–4	Wong M C (MAS); L 16–21, 8–21	Did not advance			

== Boxing ==
In total, two Bulgarian athletes participated in the boxing events – Boris Georgiev in the light welterweight category and Kubrat Pulev in the super heavyweight category.

Athlete	Event	Round of 32	Round of 16	Quarterfinals	Semifinals	Final	
Athlete	Event	Opposition Result	Opposition Result	Opposition Result	Opposition Result	Opposition Result	Rank
Boris Georgiev	Light welterweight	Molina (USA); W 14–1	Mönkh-Erdene (MGL); L 3–10	Did not advance			
Kubrat Pulev	Super heavyweight	—N/a	Rivas (COL); L 5–11	Did not advance			

== Canoeing ==
In total, two Bulgarian athletes participated in the canoeing events – Adnan Aliev and Deyan Georgiev in the men's C-2 500 m and the men's C-2 1,000 m.

Athlete	Event	Heats		Semifinals		Final	
Athlete	Event	Time	Rank	Time	Rank	Time	Rank
Adnan Aliev; Deyan Georgiev	Men's C-2 500 m	1:43.428	5 QS	1:42.891	2 Q	1:43.971	7
Adnan Aliev; Deyan Georgiev	Men's C-2 1,000 m	3:54.111	6 QS	3:45.019	4	Did not advance	

== Cycling ==
In total, two Bulgarian athletes participated in the cycling events – Daniel Petrov and Evgeniy Gerganov in the men's road race.

Athlete	Event	Time	Rank
Daniel Petrov	Men's road race	Did not finish	
Evgeniy Gerganov	Men's road race	Did not finish	

== Gymnastics ==
In total, 10 Bulgarian athletes participated in the gymnastics events – Nikolina Tankusheva in the women's artistic individual all-around, Yordan Yovchev in the men's rings, Elizabeth Paisieva and Simona Peycheva in the women's rhythmic individual all-around and Tsveta Kuseva, Yolita Manolova, Zornitsa Marinova, Maya Paunovska, Yoanna Tancheva and Tatyana Tongova in the women's rhythmic team all-around.

=== Artistic ===
Men

Athlete	Event	Qualification								Final							
Athlete	Event	Apparatus						Total	Rank	Apparatus						Total	Rank
Athlete	Event	F	PH	R	V	PB	HB	Total	Rank	F	PH	R	V	PB	HB	Total	Rank
Yordan Yovchev	Rings	—N/a		16.275	—N/a			16.275	2 Q	—N/a		15.525	—N/a			15.525	8

Women

Athlete	Event	Qualification						Final					
Athlete	Event	Apparatus				Total	Rank	Apparatus				Total	Rank
Athlete	Event	F	V	UB	BB	Total	Rank	F	V	UB	BB	Total	Rank
Nikolina Tankusheva	All-around	12.850	13.850	12.700	12.075	51.475	61	Did not advance					

=== Rhythmic ===
Athlete	Event	Qualification						Final					
Athlete	Event	Rope	Hoop	Clubs	Ribbon	Total	Rank	Rope	Hoop	Clubs	Ribbon	Total	Rank
Elizabeth Paisieva	Individual	16.175	16.400	16.200	14.525	63.300	19	Did not advance					
Simona Peycheva	Individual	16.900	17.125	16.475	16.675	67.175	9 Q	15.975	16.975	16.775	15.750	65.475	10

Athlete	Event	Qualification				Final			
Athlete	Event	5 ropes	3 hoops 2 clubs	Total	Rank	5 ropes	3 hoops 2 clubs	Total	Rank
Tsveta Kuseva; Yolita Manolova; Zornitsa Marinova; Maya Paunovska; Yoanna Tancheva; Tatyana Tongova	Team	16.825	16.875	33.700	5 Q	16.750	16.800	33.550	5

== Rowing ==
In total, three Bulgarian athletes participated in the rowing events – Ivo Yanakiev and Martin Yanakiev in the men's double sculls and Rumyana Neykova in the women's single sculls.

Men

Athlete	Event	Heats		Repechage		Semifinals		Final	
Athlete	Event	Time	Rank	Time	Rank	Time	Rank	Time	Rank
Ivo Yanakiev; Martin Yanakiev	Double sculls	6:45.03	4 R	6:24.70	3 SA/B	6:26.62	4 FB	6:45.91	10

Women

Athlete	Event	Heats		Quarterfinals		Semifinals		Final	
Athlete	Event	Time	Rank	Time	Rank	Time	Rank	Time	Rank
Rumyana Neykova	Single sculls	7:56.07	1 QF	7:22.37	1 SA/B	7:33.29	2 FA	7:22.34	Gold medal

== Sailing ==
In total, one Bulgarian athlete participated in the sailing events – Irina Konstantinova-Bontemps in the women's sailboard.

Athlete	Event	Race											Net points	Final rank
Athlete	Event	1	2	3	4	5	6	7	8	9	10	M*	Net points	Final rank
Irina Konstantinova-Bontemps	RS:X	~~18~~	8	8	15	18	17	10	10	2	13	EL	101	12

== Shooting ==
In total, four Bulgarian athletes participated in the shooting events – Desislava Balabanova in the women's 10 m air rifle and the women's 50 m rifle three positions, Tanyu Kiryakov in the men's 10 m air pistol and the men's 50 m pistol and Mariya Grozdeva and Irena Tanova in the women's 10 m air pistol and the women's 25 m pistol.

Men

Athlete	Event	Qualification		Final	
Athlete	Event	Points	Rank	Points	Rank
Tanyu Kiryakov	10 m air pistol	580	10	Did not advance	
Tanyu Kiryakov	50 m pistol	562	7 Q	656.8	6

Women

Athlete	Event	Qualification		Final	
Athlete	Event	Points	Rank	Points	Rank
Desislava Balabanova	10 m air rifle	393	26	Did not advance	
Desislava Balabanova	50 m rifle 3 positions	574	28	Did not advance	
Mariya Grozdeva	10 m air pistol	382	11	Did not advance	
Mariya Grozdeva	25 m pistol	583	5 Q	786.6	5
Irena Tanova	10 m air pistol	377	32	Did not advance	
Irena Tanova	25 m pistol	289	37	Did not advance	

== Swimming ==
In total, four Bulgarian athletes participated in the swimming events – Mihail Alexandrov in the men's 100 m breaststroke, the men's 200 m breaststroke and the men's 200 m individual medley, Georgi Palazov in the men's 100 m butterfly and the men's 200 m butterfly, Nina Rangelova in the women's 200 m freestyle and Petar Stoychev in the 1,500 m freestyle and the men's 10 km open water.

Men

Athlete	Event	Heat		Semifinal		Final	
Athlete	Event	Time	Rank	Time	Rank	Time	Rank
Mihail Alexandrov	100 m breaststroke	1:00.69 NR	14 Q	1:00.61 NR	11	Did not advance	
Mihail Alexandrov	200 m breaststroke	2:11.94 NR	24	Did not advance			
Mihail Alexandrov	200 m individual medley	2:00.70	20	Did not advance			
Georgi Palazov	100 m butterfly	55.25	60	Did not advance			
Georgi Palazov	200 m butterfly	2:01.84	39	Did not advance			
Petar Stoychev	1,500 m freestyle	15:28.84	30	—N/a		Did not advance	
Petar Stoychev	10 km open water	—N/a				1:52:09.1	6

Women

Athlete	Event	Heat		Semifinal		Final	
Athlete	Event	Time	Rank	Time	Rank	Time	Rank
Nina Rangelova	200 m freestyle	2:00.66 NR	30	Did not advance			

== Tennis ==
In total, one Bulgarian athlete participated in the tennis events – Tsvetana Pironkova in the women's singles.

Athlete	Event	Round of 64	Round of 32	Round of 16	Quarterfinals	Semifinals	Final / BM	
Athlete	Event	Opposition Score	Opposition Score	Opposition Score	Opposition Score	Opposition Score	Opposition Score	Rank
Tsvetana Pironkova	Women's singles	Domachowska (POL); W 6–3, 6–4	Cibulková (SVK); L 2–6, 2–6	Did not advance				

== Volleyball ==
In total, 12 Bulgarian athletes participated in the volleyball events – Todor Aleksiev, Krasimir Gaydarski, Evgeni Ivanov, Matey Kaziyski, Plamen Konstantinov, Vladimir Nikolov, Teodor Salparov, Kostadin Stoykov, Ivan Tasev, Hristo Tsvetanov, Boyan Yordanov and Andrey Zhekov in the indoor men's tournament.

Group play

Pos	Team	Pld	W	L	Pts	SPW	SPL	SPR	SW	SL	SR	Qualification
1	United States	5	5	0	10	460	371	1.240	15	4	3.750	Quarterfinals
2	Italy	5	4	1	9	439	401	1.095	13	6	2.167	Quarterfinals
3	Bulgaria	5	3	2	8	446	440	1.014	10	9	1.111	Quarterfinals
4	China	5	2	3	7	445	492	0.904	9	13	0.692	Quarterfinals
5	Venezuela	5	1	4	6	421	451	0.933	8	12	0.667	
6	Japan	5	0	5	5	392	448	0.875	4	15	0.267	

10 August 2008; 20:00	Bulgaria	3–1	China	Capital Indoor Stadium, Beijing; Attendance: 11,000; Referees: Laert Souza (BRA), Mitch Davidson (CAN)
10 August 2008; 20:00	(25–20, 25–21, 26–28, 25–19); Results Statistics			Capital Indoor Stadium, Beijing; Attendance: 11,000; Referees: Laert Souza (BRA), Mitch Davidson (CAN)

12 August 2008; 22:45	Japan	1–3	Bulgaria	Capital Indoor Stadium, Beijing; Attendance: 3,200; Referees: Mitch Davidson (CAN), Victor Rodriguez (PUR)
12 August 2008; 22:45	(27–29, 25–23, 21–25, 19–25); Results Statistics			Capital Indoor Stadium, Beijing; Attendance: 3,200; Referees: Mitch Davidson (CAN), Victor Rodriguez (PUR)

14 August 2008; 22:30	Bulgaria	1–3	United States	Capital Indoor Stadium, Beijing; Attendance: 5,700; Referees: Laert Souza (BRA), Kun-Tae Kim (KOR)
14 August 2008; 22:30	(29–27, 21–25, 14–25, 24–26) result statistics			Capital Indoor Stadium, Beijing; Attendance: 5,700; Referees: Laert Souza (BRA), Kun-Tae Kim (KOR)

16 August 2008; 14:50	Italy	3–0	Bulgaria	Capital Indoor Stadium, Beijing; Attendance: 8,000; Referees: Umit Sokullu (TUR), Mohammad Shahmiri (IRI)
16 August 2008; 14:50	(25–20, 25–21, 25–16) result statistics			Capital Indoor Stadium, Beijing; Attendance: 8,000; Referees: Umit Sokullu (TUR), Mohammad Shahmiri (IRI)

18 August 2008; 10:00	Bulgaria	3–1	Venezuela	Beijing Institute of Technology Gymnasium, Beijing; Attendance: 3,400; Referees: Mohammad Shahmiri (IRI), Laert Souza (BRA)
18 August 2008; 10:00	(23–25, 25–19, 25–16, 25–22) result statistics			Beijing Institute of Technology Gymnasium, Beijing; Attendance: 3,400; Referees: Mohammad Shahmiri (IRI), Laert Souza (BRA)

Quarterfinal

20 August 2008; 10:00	Bulgaria	1–3	Russia	Capital Indoor Stadium, Beijing; Attendance: 11,500; Referees: Bela Hobor (HUN), Frans Loderus (NED)
20 August 2008; 10:00	(25–20, 16–25, 22–25, 21–25) result statistics			Capital Indoor Stadium, Beijing; Attendance: 11,500; Referees: Bela Hobor (HUN), Frans Loderus (NED)

== Wrestling ==
In total, 12 Bulgarian athletes participated in the wrestling events – Serafim Barzakov in the men's freestyle −66 kg category, Bozhidar Boyadzhiev in the men's freestyle −120 kg category, Kaloyan Dinchev in the men's Greco-Roman −96 kg category, Nikolay Gergov in the men's Greco-Roman −66 kg category, Ivan Ivanov in the men's Greco-Roman −120 kg category, Armen Nazaryan in the men's Greco-Roman −60 kg category, Kiril Terziev in the men's freestyle −74 kg category, Elina Vaseva in the women's freestyle −63 kg category, Radoslav Velikov in the men's freestyle −55 kg category, Venelin Venkov in the men's Greco-Roman −55 kg category, Yavor Yanakiev in the men's Greco-Roman −74 kg category and Stanka Zlateva in the women's freestyle −72 kg category.

On 9 August 2008, Anatolie Guidea ruptured his Achilles' tendon and could not compete in the event. The Bulgarian Wrestling Federation has asked another Bulgarian wrestler, Ismail Redzhep, to replace Guidea, but he was involved in a car accident, prompting him not to compete. Eventually, the freed spot was taken by Mike Zadick from the United States.

Men's freestyle

Athlete	Event	Qualification	Round of 16	Quarterfinal	Semifinal	Repechage 1	Repechage 2	Final / BM	
Athlete	Event	Opposition Result	Opposition Result	Opposition Result	Opposition Result	Opposition Result	Opposition Result	Opposition Result	Rank
Radoslav Velikov	−55 kg	Bye	Cejudo (USA); L 1–3 ^{PP}	Did not advance		Bye	Gochashvili (GEO); W 3–1 ^{PP}	Sevdimov (AZE); W 3–1 ^{PP}	3rd place, bronze medalist(s)
Serafim Barzakov	−66 kg	Bye	Jung Y-H (KOR); W 3–1 ^{PP}	Tushishvili (GEO); L 0–3 ^{PO}	Did not advance				11
Kiril Terziev	−74 kg	Bye	Jokar (IRI); W 3–1 ^{PP}	Gitinov (KGZ); W 5–0 ^{VT}	Saitiev (RUS); L 0–5 ^{VT}	Bye		Fundora (CUB); W 5–0 ^{VT}	3rd place, bronze medalist(s)
Bozhidar Boyadzhiev	−120 kg	Akhmedov (RUS); L 0–3 ^{PO}	Did not advance			Masoumi (IRI); L 1–3 ^{PP}	Did not advance		13

Men's Greco-Roman

Athlete	Event	Qualification	Round of 16	Quarterfinal	Semifinal	Repechage 1	Repechage 2	Final / BM	
Athlete	Event	Opposition Result	Opposition Result	Opposition Result	Opposition Result	Opposition Result	Opposition Result	Opposition Result	Rank
Venelin Venkov	−55 kg	Sourian (IRI); L 0–5 ^{VT}	Did not advance						17
Armen Nazaryan	−60 kg	Bedinadze (GEO); W 3–1 ^{PP}	Sasamoto (JPN); W 3–1 ^{PP}	Rahimov (AZE); L 1–3 ^{PP}	Did not advance	Bye	Sheng J (CHN); L 1–3 ^{PP}	Did not advance	7
Nikolay Gergov	−66 kg	Bye	Eroğlu (TUR); W 3–1 ^{PP}	Kovalenko (RUS); W 3–1 ^{PP}	Begaliev (KGZ); L 1–3 ^{PP}	Bye		Vardanyan (UKR); L 1–3 ^{PP}	5
Yavor Yanakiev	−74 kg	Bye	Chang Yx (CHN); L 1–3 ^{PP}	Did not advance		Bye	Barrera (PER); W 3–0 ^{PO}	Mikhalovich (BLR); W 3–1 ^{PP}	3rd place, bronze medalist(s)
Kaloyan Dinchev	−96 kg	Bye	Švec (CZE); L 1–3 ^{PP}	Did not advance					14
Ivan Ivanov	−120 kg	Bye	Szczepaniak (FRA); L 1–3 ^{PP}	Did not advance					13

Women's freestyle

Athlete	Event	Qualification	Round of 16	Quarterfinal	Semifinal	Repechage 1	Repechage 2	Final / BM	
Athlete	Event	Opposition Result	Opposition Result	Opposition Result	Opposition Result	Opposition Result	Opposition Result	Opposition Result	Rank
Elina Vaseva	−63 kg	Bye	Dunn (GUM); W 3–0 ^{PO}	Kartashova (RUS); L 1–3 ^{PP}	Did not advance	Bye	Shalygina (KAZ); L 1–3 ^{PP}	Did not advance	7
Stanka Zlateva	−72 kg	—N/a	Akuffo (CAN); W 3–0 ^{PO}	Unda (ESP); W 3–1 ^{PP}	Wieszczek (POL); W 3–0 ^{PO}	Bye		Wang J (CHN); L 0–5 ^{VT}	2nd place, silver medalist(s)

== Weightlifting controversy ==
The Bulgarian Olympic Committee initially selected a team of eight athletes, six men and two women, for weightlifting, but decided to withdraw its entire weightlifting delegation to the games after its athletes tested positive for a banned anabolic steroid substance.
