= Canoeing at the 2008 Summer Olympics – Men's C-2 1000 metres =

The men's C-2 1000 metres competition in canoeing at the 2008 Summer Olympics took place at the Shunyi Olympic Rowing-Canoeing Park in Beijing between August 18 and 22. The C-2 event was raced in two-man sprint canoes.

Competition consisted of three rounds: the heats, the semifinals and the final. All boats competed in the heats. The top three finishers in each of the two heats advanced directly to the final, while the top nine finishers from both heats moved on to the semifinal. The top three finishers in the semifinal joined the heats winners in the final.

Heats took place on August 18, semifinals on August 20, and the final on August 22.

== Medalists ==
Gold	Silver	Bronze
Aliaksandr Bahdanovich and Andrei Bahdanovich (BLR)	Christian Gille and Tomasz Wylenzek (GER)	György Kozmann and Tamás Kiss (HUN)

== Schedule ==
All times are China Standard Time (UTC+8)

Date	Time	Round
Monday, August 18, 2008	17:10-17:30	Heats
Wednesday, August 20, 2008	16:30-16:40	Semifinal
Friday, August 22, 2008	17:05-17:15	Final

== Results ==
=== Heats ===
Qualification Rules: 1..3->Final, 4..7->Semifinal + 8th best time, Rest Out

==== Heat 1 ====
Rank	Canoer	Country	Time	Notes
1	Christian Gille, Tomasz Wylenzek	Germany	3:40.939	QF
2	Constantin Ciprian Popa, Niculae Flocea	Romania	3:41.846	QF
3	Andrew Russell, Gabriel Beauchesne-Sévigny	Canada	3:43.491	QF
4	György Kozmann, Tamás Kiss	Hungary	3:46.020	QS
5	Bertrand Hémonic, William Tchamba	France	3:46.431	QS
6	Everardo Cristóbal, Dimas Camilo	Mexico	3:51.684	QS
7	Ruslan Dzhalilov, Petro Kruk	Ukraine	4:06.744	QS

==== Heat 2 ====
Rank	Canoer	Country	Time	Notes
1	Aliaksandr Bahdanovich, Andrei Bahdanovich	Belarus	3:40.369	QF
2	Serguey Torres, Karel Aguilar Chacón	Cuba	3:41.171	QF
3	Sergey Ulegin, Aleksandr Kostoglod	Russia	3:41.291	QF
4	Chen Zhongyun, Zhang Zhiwu	China	3:41.658	QS
5	Wojciech Tyszyński, Paweł Baraszkiewicz	Poland	3:42.177	QS
6	Deyan Georgiev, Adnan Aliev	Bulgaria	3:54.111	QS

=== Semifinal ===
Qualification Rules: 1..3->Final, Rest Out

Rank	Canoer	Country	Time	Notes
1	Wojciech Tyszyński, Paweł Baraszkiewicz	Poland	3:42.435	QF
2	György Kozmann, Tamás Kiss	Hungary	3:42.482	QF
3	Chen Zhongyun, Zhang Zhiwu	China	3:42.619	QF
4	Deyan Georgiev, Adnan Aliev	Bulgaria	3:45.019	
5	Ruslan Dzhalilov, Petro Kruk	Ukraine	3:46.050	
6	Bertrand Hémonic, William Tchamba	France	3:48.406	
7	Everardo Cristóbal, Dimas Camilo	Mexico	3:49.695	

=== Final ===
Rank	Canoer	Country	Time	Notes
Gold medal	Aliaksandr Bahdanovich, Andrei Bahdanovich	Belarus	3:36.365	
Silver medal	Christian Gille, Tomasz Wylenzek	Germany	3:36.588	
Bronze medal	György Kozmann, Tamás Kiss	Hungary	3:40.258	
4	Constantin Ciprian Popa, Niculae Flocea	Romania	3:40.342	
5	Chen Zhongyun, Zhang Zhiwu	China	3:40.593	
6	Andrew Russell, Gabriel Beauchesne-Sévigny	Canada	3:41.165	
7	Wojciech Tyszyński, Paweł Baraszkiewicz	Poland	3:42.845	
8	Sergey Ulegin, Aleksandr Kostoglod	Russia	3:44.669	
9	Serguey Torres, Karel Aguilar Chacón	Cuba	3:48.877	
