= György Kolonics =

Hungarian canoeist (1972–2008)

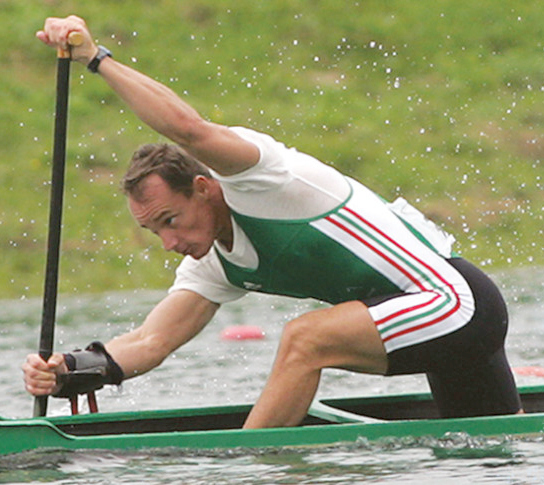
- Kolonics on a 2016 stamp of Hungary

Personal information
- Born: 4 June 1972 Budapest, Hungary
- Died: 15 July 2008 (aged 36) Budapest, Hungary
- Height: 180 cm (5 ft 11 in)
- Weight: 80 kg (176 lb)

Sport
- Sport: Canoe sprint
- Club: Budapesti Spartacus; Csepel SC, Budapest
Medal record
Men's canoe sprint
Representing Hungary
Event	1st	2nd	3rd
Olympic Games	2	0	2
World Championships	15	9	4
European Championships	3	7	2
Total	20	16	8
Representing Hungary
Olympic Games
Gold medal – first place	1996 Atlanta	C-2 500 m
Bronze medal – third place	1996 Atlanta	C-2 1000 m
Gold medal – first place	2000 Sydney	C-1 500 m
Bronze medal – third place	2004 Athens	C-2 1000 m
World Championships
Gold medal – first place	1993 Copenhagen	C-2 500 m
Gold medal – first place	1993 Copenhagen	C-4 1000 m
Silver medal – second place	1993 Copenhagen	C-1 500 m
Gold medal – first place	1994 Mexico City	C-4 1000 m
Silver medal – second place	1994 Mexico City	C-2 200 m
Silver medal – second place	1994 Mexico City	C-2 500 m
Silver medal – second place	1994 Mexico City	C-4 200 m
Gold medal – first place	1995 Duisburg	C-2 200 m
Gold medal – first place	1995 Duisburg	C-2 500 m
Gold medal – first place	1995 Duisburg	C-2 1000 m
Gold medal – first place	1995 Duisburg	C-4 200 m
Gold medal – first place	1995 Duisburg	C-4 500 m
Gold medal – first place	1997 Dartmouth	C-2 500 m
Gold medal – first place	1997 Dartmouth	C-4 500 m
Silver medal – second place	1997 Dartmouth	C-2 1000 m
Silver medal – second place	1997 Dartmouth	C-4 200 m
Gold medal – first place	1998 Szeged	C-2 500 m
Gold medal – first place	1998 Szeged	C-4 500 m
Silver medal – second place	2001 Poznań	C-1 500 m
Bronze medal – third place	2001 Poznań	C-1 1000 m
Silver medal – second place	2002 Seville	C-1 500 m
Gold medal – first place	2003 Gainesville	C-4 200 m
Bronze medal – third place	2003 Gainesville	C-2 1000 m
Silver medal – second place	2005 Zagreb	C-2 500 m
Bronze medal – third place	2005 Zagreb	C-2 1000 m
Gold medal – first place	2006 Szeged	C-2 1000 m
Bronze medal – third place	2006 Szeged	C-2 500 m
Gold medal – first place	2007 Duisburg	C-2 500 m

György "Kolo" Kolonics (4 June 1972 – 15 July 2008) was a Hungarian sprint canoeist who won two gold and two bronze medals at four Summer Olympics. He also won a record fifteen gold medals at the ICF Canoe Sprint World Championships. He died from cardiac arrest while preparing for his fifth Olympics.

== Sporting career ==
Kolonics started canoeing at the Budapesti Spartacus sport club, but soon moved to Csepel SC and remained at the club for his entire career. He first represented Hungary at the 1991 World Championships, and achieved a fifth and the sixth place in the C-4 events. At the 1992 Summer Olympics he achieved a fifth and the seventh place in the C-2 events with Attila Pálizs.

After the 1992 Olympics he teamed up with Csaba Horváth, and the pair dominated the doubles for several years. They won their first gold together at the 1993 World Championships, and after winning a record of five gold medals at the 1995 World Championships they crowned their cooperation at the 1996 Summer Olympics by winning the gold in C-2 500 m in a photo finish and a bronze medal in C-2 1000 m. They won a total of 11 World Championships gold medals together in C-2 and C-4 events, and between 1993 and 1998 there were only two major international competitions where they did not win the C-2 500 m gold medal.

After Horváth's retirement in 1998, Kolonics started to focus on the singles and at the 2000 Summer Olympics he won the C-1 500 m gold medal. Afterwards he returned to doubles again, teaming up with the younger György Kozmann. The pair won a bronze medal at the 2004 Summer Olympics in C-2 1000 m, and a gold medal at both the 2006 World Championships and the 2007 World Championships in C-2 500 m. They were also to represent Hungary in both C-2 500 m and C-2 1000 m at the 2008 Summer Olympics. This would have been the fifth Olympic Games for Kolonics, who was also being considered to carry the Hungarian flag at the opening ceremony (this honour later went to kayaker Zoltán Kammerer).

== Death ==
Kolonics died on 15 July 2008 in Budapest of cardiac arrest. He lost consciousness during training and the attending paramedics could not revive him. The autopsy found a small amount of plaque in his coronary arteries which might explain his death. Following his death, a press debate evolved between his long-time trainer Róbert Ludasi and the Hungarian National Ambulance Service (OMSZ). Ludasi blamed the ambulance for arriving 37 minutes after being alerted and having no defibrillator in the vehicle, while the OMSZ claimed that paramedics came in 17 minutes and started to defibrillate Kolonics almost immediately. They also said that bandages were found on the canoeist's body (the existence of which was denied by the trainer) to reduce muscular fatigue, which is potentially dangerous for people having heart problems. Finally the Hungarian Canoe Federation (MKKSZ) and the OMSZ settled the matter with a joint statement on 21 July, with Ludasi rendering thanks to the paramedics for their "conscientious and high standard" attempts to revive Kolonics, and the MKKSZ declaring that the bandages were pre-tested and their procurement authorized by the Hungarian Olympic Committee.

After the death of Kolonics some (including world champion canoeist Attila Vajda) suggested that his spot should not be filled in the Hungarian Olympic team, thus Hungary should not start a unit in the C-2 events of the 2008 Olympics. Kozmann himself initially refused to take part in the Olympics, but eventually changed his mind after consulting with his coach, friends and Kolonics's friends. He competed in the C-2 1000 m with Tamás Kiss finishing in third place, while the C-2 500 m spot went to brothers Mihály and Mátyás Sáfrán. Vajda wore a black armband in memory of Kolonics during the 2008 games.

== Awards ==
- Hungarian canoer of the Year (10): 1993, 1995, 1996, 1999, 2000, 2001, 2002, 2003, 2005, 2006
- Member of the Hungarian team of year (with Csaba Horváth): 1995, 1996
- Honorary Citizen of Csepel (1996)
- Perpetual champion of Csepel SC (1997)
- Best male Athlete of Csepel SC (1997)
- Honorary Citizen of Budafok-Tétény (2000)
- Perpetual champion of Hungarian Kayak-Canoe (2008)

Orders and special awards

- Order of Merit of the Republic of Hungary – Officer's Cross (1996)
- Order of Merit of the Republic of Hungary – Commander's Cross (2000)
