= Újpesti TE (disambiguation) =

Újpesti TE is a sport society in Újpest, Hungary. It may also refer to:

- Újpesti TE (canoeing) - canoeing/kayaking club
- Újpesti TE (fencing) - fencing club
- Újpesti TE (ice hockey) - ice hockey club
- Újpesti TE (waterpolo) - water polo club

== See also ==
- Újpest FC - football club
