= Tomasz Górski =

Tomasz Górski may refer to:

- Tomasz Górski (canoeist), Polish canoeist
- Tomasz Górski (politician) (born 1973), Polish politician
