= Silviu Simioncencu =

Romanian canoeist (born 1975)

Medal record

Men's canoe sprint

World Championships
Gold medal – first place	2003 Gainesville	C-2 1000 m
Gold medal – first place	2003 Gainesville	C-4 500 m
Gold medal – first place	2005 Zagreb	C-4 500 m
Gold medal – first place	2007 Duisburg	C-4 1000 m
Silver medal – second place	2002 Seville	C-2 500 m
Silver medal – second place	2003 Gainesville	C-2 500 m
Bronze medal – third place	2003 Gainesville	C-4 200 m
Bronze medal – third place	2006 Szeged	C-4 500 m
Bronze medal – third place	2009 Dartmouth	C-4 1000 m

Silviu Simioncencu (born December 13, 1975) is a Romanian sprint canoer and three-time world champion in the Canadian canoe events.

== Career ==
Born December 13, 1975, in Crişan, Tulcea, he won his first major title at the European championships in 2002, winning the C2 1000m final with Florin Popescu. In 2003, they became world champions at Gainesville, USA. Simioncencu was also a member of Romania's C-4 500 m crew which crossed the line second but was later awarded the gold medal after Russian Sergey Ulegin failed a doping test. A fourth-place finish in the C-4 200 m was also upgraded to bronze for the same reason.

In 2004, Simioncencu also won a C-4 500 m gold medal at the European championships, this time without the aid of disqualifications. At the Athens Olympics Simioncencu and Popescu were unlucky to miss a medal, finishing fourth in both C-2 finals (500 m and 1000 m).

In 2005, despite having changed two crew members, the Romanians retained their European C-4 title and went on to win the World Championship gold medal at Zagreb.

In 2006, Simioncencu won his third consecutive European C-4 500 m title at Račice, Czech Republic. At the World Championships in Szeged, Hungary, however the Romanians had to settle for the bronze medal behind Belarus and Poland. He won another bronze medal in the C-4 1000 m event at the 2009 championships.

Simioncencu is a member of the CSA Steaua Bucharest club. He is 180 cm (5'11) tall and weighs 80 kg (176 lbs).
