= Mihály Sáfrán =

Hungarian canoeist

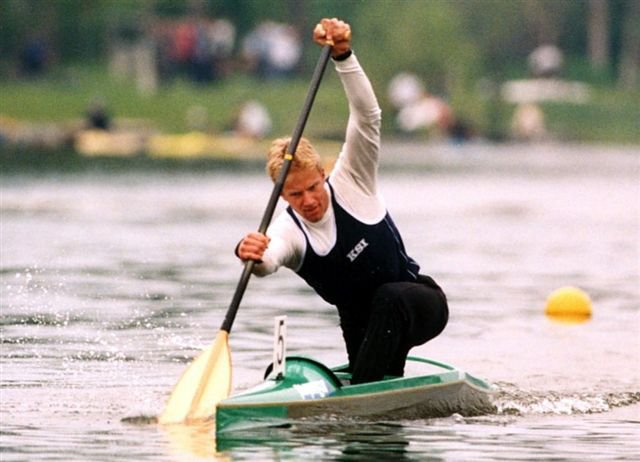

Personal information
- Full name: Mihály Zoltán Sáfrán
- Nationality: Hungarian
- Born: 21 March 1985 (age 41) Győr, Hungary
- Height: 1.87 m (6 ft 2 in)
- Weight: 89 kg (196 lb)
- Website: http://mihalysafran.com/

Sport
- Sport: Sprint canoeing
- Club: Építők MDKC
- Coached by: Ligeti László, Soltész Árpád, Oláh Tamás, Szabó Attila, Ludasi Róbert, Szilárdi Katalin
- Retired: 2016

Achievements and titles
- Personal best: C-1 1000m 3:49, C-1 500m 1:49, C-2 1000m 3:32
Medal record
Representing Hungary
World Championship
Bronze medal – third place	2011 Szeged	C-4 1000 m
European Championship
Gold medal – first place	2009 Brandenburg	C-2 1000 m
Gold medal – first place	2011 Belgrade	C-4 1000 m
U23 European Championship
Gold medal – first place	2007 Belgrade	C-2 1000 m
Gold medal – first place	2008 Szeged	C-2 1000 m
Bronze medal – third place	2004 Poznan	C-2 1000 m
Bronze medal – third place	2006 Athens	C-4 1000 m
Bronze medal – third place	2007 Belgrade	C-2 500 m
Junior World Championship
Gold medal – first place	2003 Komatsu	C-1 1000 m
Bronze medal – third place	2001 Curitiba	C-4 1000 m
Bronze medal – third place	2003 Komatsu	C-4 500 m

Mihály Zoltán Sáfrán (born 21 March 1985 in Győr, Hungary) is a Hungarian former professional athlete in canoe sprint, fitness coach and health and fitness author.

== Career ==
Sáfrán is a two-times European champion of the 1000 metres race in C-2 and C-4 (2009, 2011), and a World Championship bronze medalist from 2011 in C-4 on the same distance. He has a 6th place from C-2 Canoe Marathon (2007) and C-4 1000m European Championship (2005), 5th place on WCh in C-2 1000m (2009). Two times national champion.

At age group events he has 2 gold medals from U23 European Championships in C-2 1000m (2007, 2008), 3 times bronze in C-2 500m (2007), C-2 1000m (2004), C-4 1000m (2006). He is a junior World Champion in C-1 1000m (2003), 2 times bronze medalist in C-4 1000m (2001) and C-4 500m (2003). 30 times national champion.

He also participated at the 2008 Summer Olympics in Beijing, finished at the semifinals of the C-2 500 m event.

== Post professional career ==
After the elite sport career, he started writing books and articles about fitness, nutrition, cold adaptation and health, explained by quantum-biology science. He is also coaching people for general fitness and performance since 2014. His new sports are SunnyFitness (Movement Generalist Fitness), SUP and the OCR (Obstacle Course Racing). He managed to win the 6 km Bestial Race in Lanzarote (2022).

== Books ==
- A paleón túl (Beyond paleo, 2014)
- Vad paleo (Wild paleo, 2016 with Elmira Mezei)
- Napfény diéta (Sunlight diet, 2017)
- Legyél Te is biohacker! (Become a biohacker, 2019 with Lakatos Péter)
- SunnyFitness (2019), English: SunnyFitness
- Irodai Egyensúly Program (Office Balance Program, 2019)
- SunnyFitness - Test karbantartás (2020), English: SunnyFitness - Body Maintenance
- SunnyFitness - Kőkondi (2022), English: SunnyFitness - Stone Gym
- SunnyFitness - OCR (2022)
- Táplálkozásvallások 2023 (Nutrition religions 2023, 2023)
- SunnyFitness - Ezermester Edzés (2024), English: SunnyFitness - Become a Movement Generalist

== Personal life ==
He has a younger brother, Mátyás, who is also a sprint canoer and partners Mihály in the C-2 and C-4 boat as well.
