= Zhang Zhiwu =

Chinese canoeist

Medal record

Men's sprint canoe

Representing China

Asian Championships
Gold medal – first place	2007 Hwacheon	C-2 1000 m

Zhang Zhiwu (born November 25, 1989, in Fuzhou, Jiangxi) is a Chinese sprint canoeist who competed in the late 2000s. Paired with Chen Zhongyun, he finished fifth in the C-2 1000 m event at the 2008 Summer Olympics in Beijing.
