= Petro Kruk =

Ukrainian canoeist

Petro Mykhaylovych Kruk (Ukrainian: Петро Михайлович Крук) (born 20 March 1985, in Dubno) is a Ukrainian sprint canoeist who competed in the late 2000s. At the 2008 Summer Olympics in Beijing, paired with Ruslan Dzhalilov, he was eliminated in the semifinals of the C-2 1000 m event.
