= Aleksandr Vladimirovich Kovalyov =

Russian canoeist

Aleksandr Kovalyov
Medal record

Men's canoe sprint

Representing Russia

Olympic Games
| Silver medal – second place | 2004 Athens | C-2 1000 m |
| Bronze medal – third place | 2004 Athens | C-2 500 m |

World Championships
| Gold medal – first place | 1998 Szeged | C-2 1000 m |
| Gold medal – first place | 1999 Milan | C-2 1000 m |
| Gold medal – first place | 2005 Zagreb | C-4 200 m |
| Silver medal – second place | 2003 Gainesville | C-2 1000 m |
| Bronze medal – third place | 1999 Milan | C-2 500 m |
| Bronze medal – third place | 2001 Poznań | C-4 200 m |

Aleksandr Vladimirovich Kovalyov (Russian: Александр Владимирович Ковалёв; born March 2, 1975) is a Russian sprint canoeist who has competed from 1997 to 2005.

Having just missed out on a medal at the Sydney Olympics, he and partner Aleksandr Kostoglod won two medals at Athens in 2004 with a silver in the C-2 1000 m and bronze C-2 500 m events.

Kovalev also won six medals at the ICF Canoe Sprint World Championships with three golds (C-2 1000 m: 1998, 1999; C-4 200 m: 2005), one silver (C-2 1000 m: 2003), and two bronzes (C-2 500 m: 1999, C-4 200 m: 2001).

A member of the Russian national team since 1997, he is 170 centimetres (5.6 ft) tall and weighs 70 kilograms (150 lb). Sources describe his technique as a key element of his competitive performance.
