= Kyle Jeffery =

Canadian canoeist

Medal record

Men's canoe sprint

World Championships
Silver medal – second place	2006 Szeged	C-4 1000 m

Kyle Jeffery is a Canadian sprint canoer who has competed since 2005. He won a silver medal in the C-4 1000 m event at the 2006 ICF Canoe Sprint World Championships in Szeged. Since retirement in 2009, Kyle is now the head coach at Mississauga Canoe Club where he is currently coaching future Junior World, Senior World and Olympians Katie Vincent, Evan Bezemer, and his prized men's U-17 tub C4: Daniel Cuba, Morgan Macdonald, Chris Chambers, and Sam Djurfeldt are currently aspiring towards being the youngest crew to conquer the Junior Men C4 1000m Black Trophy.
