= Sergey Kosilov =

Russian canoeist

Medal record

Men's canoe sprint

World Championships
Bronze medal – third place	2006 Szeged	K-4 200 m

Sergey Kosilov is a Russian sprint canoer who has competed since the late 2000s. He won a bronze medal in the K-4 200 m event at the 2006 ICF Canoe Sprint World Championships in Szeged.
