= Nathan Johnson (canoeist) =

American canoeist (born 1976)

Nate Johnson
Personal information
- Full name: Nathan Johnson
- Born: October 3, 1976 (age 49) Seattle, Washington, U.S.
Medal record
Men's canoe sprint
Representing the United States
Pan American Games
Bronze medal – third place	1999 Winnipeg	C2 500 m
Bronze medal – third place	1999 Winnipeg	C2 1000 m

Nathan "Nate" Johnson (born October 3, 1976) is an American sprint canoer who competed in the mid-2000s. At the 2004 Summer Olympics in Athens, he was eliminated in the semifinals of both the C-2 500 m and C-2 1000 m events.
