= José Lenoir =

French canoeist

José Lenoir (born October 6, 1976) is a French sprint canoer who competed in the mid-2000s. At the 2004 Summer Olympics in Athens, he was eliminated in the semifinals of both the C-2 500 m and C-2 1000 m events. He was born in Boulogne-sur-Mer.
