= Jiří Heller =

Czech canoeist

Medal record

Men's canoe sprint

World Championships
Gold medal – first place	2006 Szeged	C-4 200 m

Jiří Heller is a Czech sprint canoeist who competed in the mid-2000s. He won a gold medal in the C-4 200 m event at the 2006 ICF Canoe Sprint World Championships in Szeged.
