= Dimas Camilo =

Mexican canoeist (born 1989)

Dimas Camilo Cortés (born October 22, 1989, in Uranden, Michoacán) is a Mexican sprint canoeist who competed in the late 2000s. At the 2008 Summer Olympics in Beijing, he was eliminated in the semifinals of both the C-2 500 m and the C-2 1000 m events. He is of Purepecha Indigenous descent.
