= William Tchamba =

French canoeist

Medal record

Men's canoe sprint

World Championships
Bronze medal – third place	2009 Dartmouth	C-1 4 x 200 m

William Tchamba (born June 11, 1984, in Lille, France) is a French sprint canoeist who has competed since the late 2000s. He won a bronze medal in the C-1 4 × 200 m event at the 2009 ICF Canoe Sprint World Championships in Dartmouth.

At the 2008 Summer Olympics in Beijing, Tchamba was eliminated in the semifinals of both the C-2 500 m and the C-2 1000 m events.
