= Canoeing at the 2008 Summer Olympics – Men's C-2 500 metres =

The men's C-2 500 metres competition in canoeing at the 2008 Summer Olympics will take place at the Shunyi Olympic Rowing-Canoeing Park in Beijing. The C-2 event is raced in two-man sprint canoes. This would be the last time the event would take place at the Summer Olympics. On 13 August 2009, it was announced by the International Canoe Federation that the men's 500 m events would be replaced by 200 m events at the 2012 Summer Olympics with one of them being K-1 200 m for the women. The other events for men at 200 m will be C-1, C-2, and K-1.

Competition consists of three rounds: the heats, the semifinals, and the final. All boats compete in the heats. The top finisher in each of the three heats advances directly to the final, while the next six finishers (places 2 through 7) in each heat move on to the semifinals. The top three finishers in each of the two semifinals join the heats winners in the final.

Heats took place on August 19, semifinal on August 21, and final on August 23.

== Schedule ==
All times are China Standard Time (UTC+8)

Date	Time	Round
Tuesday, August 19, 2008	17:30-17:50	Heats
Thursday, August 21, 2008	16:50-17:00	Semifinal
Saturday, August 23, 2008	17:05-17:20	Final

== Medalists ==
Gold	Silver	Bronze
Meng Guanliang and Yang Wenjun (CHN)	Alexander Kostoglod and Sergey Ulegin (RUS)	Christian Gille and Tomasz Wylenzek (GER)

== Results ==
=== Heats ===
Qualification Rules: 1..3->Final, 4..7->Semifinal + 8th best time, Rest Out

==== Heat 1 ====
Rank	Canoer	Country	Time	Notes
1	Meng Guanliang, Yang Wenjun	China	1:41.218	QF
2	Sergey Ulegin, Aleksandr Kostoglod	Russia	1:41.241	QF
3	Daniel Jędraszko, Roman Rynkiewicz	Poland	1:42.309	QF
4	Raimundas Labuckas, Tomas Gadeikis	Lithuania	1:42.803	QS
5	Deyan Georgiev, Adnan Aliev	Bulgaria	1:43.428	QS
6	Mátyás Sáfrán, Mihály Zoltán Sáfrán	Hungary	1:43.642	QS
7	Serguey Torres, Karel Aguilar	Cuba	1:44.155	QS
8	Everardo Cristóbal, Dimas Camilo	Mexico	1:54.090	QS

==== Heat 2 ====
Rank	Canoer	Country	Time	Notes
1	Christian Gille, Tomasz Wylenzek	Germany	1:41.513	QF
2	Andrei Bahdanovich, Aliaksandr Bahdanovich	Belarus	1:41.767	QF
3	Sergiy Bezuglyy, Maksym Prokopenko	Ukraine	1:42.054	QF
4	Iosif Chirilă, Andrei Cuculici	Romania	1:42.306	QS
5	Andrew Russell, Gabriel Beauchesne-Sévigny	Canada	1:43.189	QS
6	Bertrand Hémonic, William Tchamba	France	1:43.453	QS
7	Kaisar Nurmaganbetov, Aleksey Dyadchuk	Kazakhstan	1:45.730	QS

=== Semifinal ===
Qualification Rules: 1..3->Final, Rest Out

Rank	Canoer	Country	Time	Notes
1	Iosif Chirilă, Andrei Cuculici	Romania	1:42.545	QF
2	Deyan Georgiev, Adnan Aliev	Bulgaria	1:42.891	QF
3	Andrew Russell, Gabriel Beauchesne-Sévigny	Canada	1:42.921	QF
4	Raimundas Labuckas, Tomas Gadeikis	Lithuania	1:43.299	
5	Serguey Torres, Karel Aguilar	Cuba	1:43.673	
6	Bertrand Hémonic, William Tchamba	France	1:43.874	
7	Kaisar Nurmaganbetov, Aleksey Dyadchuk	Kazakhstan	1:44.992	
8	Mátyás Sáfrán, Mihály Zoltán Sáfrán	Hungary	1:45.032	
9	Everardo Cristóbal, Dimas Camilo	Mexico	1:48.853	

=== Final ===
Rank	Canoer	Country	Time	Notes
Gold medal	Meng Guanliang, Yang Wenjun	China	1:41.025	
Silver medal	Sergey Ulegin, Aleksandr Kostoglod	Russia	1:41.282	
Bronze medal	Christian Gille, Tomasz Wylenzek	Germany	1:41.964	
4	Andrei Bahdanovich, Aliaksandr Bahdanovich	Belarus	1:41.996	
5	Andrew Russell, Gabriel Beauchesne-Sévigny	Canada	1:42.450	
6	Iosif Chirilă, Andrei Cuculici	Romania	1:43.195	
7	Deyan Georgiev, Adnan Aliev	Bulgaria	1:43.971	
8	Sergiy Bezuglyy, Maksym Prokopenko	Ukraine	1:44.157	
9	Daniel Jędraszko, Roman Rynkiewicz	Poland	1:44.389	

The Chinese duo repeated their gold from 2004 and had to be fished out of the water after Meng Guanliang dived into the water right after crossing the finish line, causing the canoe to capsize.
