= Rupert Wagner =

German sprint canoer

Medal record

Men's canoe sprint

World Championships
Silver medal – second place	2006 Szeged	K-2 1000 m

Rupert Wagner is a German sprint canoer who competed in the mid-2000s. He won a silver medal in the K-2 1000 m event at the 2006 ICF Canoe Sprint World Championships in Szeged.
