= Chen Zhongyun =

Chinese sprint canoer (born 1973)

Personal information
- Native name: 陈忠云
- Nationality: Chinese
- Born: 27 January 1973 (age 53) Hutou town, Hejiang
- Education: Hebachang Primary School, Hutou town
- Height: 1.82 m (6 ft 0 in)
- Weight: 82 kg (181 lb)

Sport
- Country: China
- Sport: Canoe sprint
Medal record
Men's canoe sprint
Representing China
Asian Championships
Gold medal – first place	2005 Putrajaya	C-1 500 m
Gold medal – first place	2007 Hwacheon	C-2 1000 m
Silver medal – second place	2005 Putrajaya	C-4 1000 m

Chen Zhongyun
- Traditional Chinese: 陳忠雲
- Simplified Chinese: 陈忠云
Transcriptions
Standard Mandarin
- Hanyu Pinyin: Chén Zhōng Yún

Chen Zhongyun (Chinese: 陈忠云; born 27 January 1973 in Hejiang, Sichuan) is a Chinese sprint canoeist who competed in the late 2000s. Paired with Zhang Zhiwu, he finished fifth in the C-2 1000 m event at the 2008 Summer Olympics in Beijing.
