= Jordan Malloch =

American canoeist (born 1978)

Personal information
- Born: September 2, 1978 (age 47) Columbus, Nebraska, U.S.
Medal record
Men's canoe sprint
Representing the United States
Pan American Games
Bronze medal – third place	1999 Winnipeg	C2 500 m
Bronze medal – third place	1999 Winnipeg	C2 1000 m

Jordan Malloch (born September 2, 1978) is an American sprint canoer who competed in the early to mid-2000s. He was eliminated in the heats of both the C-1 500 m and the C-1 1000 m events at the 2000 Summer Olympics in Sydney. Four years later in Athens, Malloch was eliminated in the semifinals of both the C-2 500 m and the C-2 1000 m events.
