= Tanja Schuck =

German canoeist

Medal record

Women's canoe sprint

World Championships
Silver medal – second place	2006 Szeged	K-4 1000 m

Tanja Schuck is a German canoe sprinter who has competed since the mid-2000s. She won a silver medal in the K-4 1000 m event at the 2006 ICF Canoe Sprint World Championships in Szeged.
