= Gabriel Talpă =

Romanian sprint canoer

Medal record

Men's canoe sprint

World Championships
Bronze medal – third place	2006 Szeged	C-4 500 m

Gabriel Talpă is a Romanian sprint canoer who has competed since the late 2000s. He won a bronze medal at the 2006 ICF Canoe Sprint World Championships in Szeged, Hungary.
