= Yannick Lavigne =

French sprint canoer (born 1975)

Medal record

Men's canoe sprint

World Championships
Bronze medal – third place	1999 Milan	C-4 500 m

Yannick Lavigne (born May 31, 1975) is a French sprint canoer who competed from the late 1990s to the mid-2000s. He won a bronze medal in the C-4 500 m event at the 1999 ICF Canoe Sprint World Championships in Milan.

Lavigne also competed at the 2004 Summer Olympics in Athens, being eliminated in the semifinal rounds in both the C-2 500 m and the C-2 1000 m events.
