= Ciprian Popa =

Romanian sprint canoer (born 1980)

Medal record

Men's canoe sprint

World Championships
| Silver medal – second place | 2005 Zagreb | C-4 1000 m |
| Bronze medal – third place | 2007 Dusiburg | C-4 500 m |

Constantin Ciprian Popa (born July 15, 1980) is a Romanian sprint canoeist who has competed since 2002. He won two medals at the ICF Canoe Sprint World Championships with a silver (C-4 1000 m: 2005) and a bronze (C-4 500 m: 2007). Gold medals European Championship (2008) C-4 500 m in Milano, Italy.

Popa finished fourth in the C-2 1000 m event at the 2008 Summer Olympics in Beijing.

Other medals

Silver medals:

- C-2 1000 m Balcanic games 2002 in Belgrad.
- C-2 500 m Balcanic games 2002 in Belgrad.

Gold medals:

- C-4 1000m World University Championship 2003 in Bari, Italy.
- C-4 500 World University Championship 2003 in Bari, Italy.
