= Michael Scarola =

Canadian canoeist

Medal record

Men's canoe sprint

Representing Canada

World Championships
Bronze medal – third place	2002 Seville	C-2 1000 m

Michael "Mike" Scarola (born January 26, 1976, in Halifax, Nova Scotia) is a Canadian sprint canoer and marathon canoeist who competed in the early 2000s. He won a bronze medal in the C-2 1000 m event at the 2002 ICF Canoe Sprint World Championships in Seville, Spain and also won a silver medal in C-2 (canoe doubles) at the ICF World Marathon Canoe Kayak Championships in Dartmouth, Nova Scotia in 2000. Mike finished sixth in the C-2 1000 m event at the 2004 Summer Olympics in Athens. He was a member of Canada's Senior National Sprint Canoe Kayak Team for 7 years.
