= Ruslan Dzhalilov =

Ukrainian canoeist

Ruslan Mirzoivych Dzhalilov (Ukrainian: Руслан Мірзоївич Джалілов; born January 24, 1982, in Zelenodolsk) is a Ukrainian sprint canoeist who has competed since the mid-2000s. At the 2004 Summer Olympics in Athens, he was eliminated in the semifinals of both the C-2 500 m and C-2 1000 m events. Four years later in Beijing, Dzhalilov, along with his doubles partner Petro Kruk, was eliminated in the semifinals of the C-2 1000 m event.
