= Andrew Russell (canoeist) =

Canadian canoeist

Personal information
- Born: 26 January 1983 (age 43) Dartmouth, Nova Scotia, Canada

Sport
- Sport: Canoeing
Medal record
Representing Canada
Men's canoe sprint
World Championships
Silver medal – second place	2006 Szeged	C-4 1000 m

Andrew Russell (born January 26, 1983) is a Canadian sprint canoeist who has paddled since he was a young boy, alongside his three brothers at Dartmouth, Nova Scotia's Banook Canoe Club. He won a silver medal in the C-4 1000 m event at the 2006 ICF Canoe Sprint World Championships in Szeged.

At the 2008 Summer Olympics in Beijing, Russell finished fifth in the C-2 500 m and sixth in the C-2 1000 m events.
