= Aleksandr Kostoglod =

Canoe racer

Medal record

Men's canoe sprint

Olympic Games
| Silver medal – second place | 2004 Athens | C-2 1000 m |
| Silver medal – second place | 2008 Beijing | C-2 500 m |
| Bronze medal – third place | 2004 Athens | C-2 500 m |

World Championships
| Gold medal – first place | 1994 Mexico City | C-4 200 m |
| Gold medal – first place | 1998 Szeged | C-2 1000 m |
| Gold medal – first place | 1999 Milan | C-2 1000 m |
| Gold medal – first place | 2002 Seville | C-4 200 m |
| Gold medal – first place | 2005 Zagreb | C-4 200 m |
| Gold medal – first place | 2006 Szeged | C-2 500 m |
| Silver medal – second place | 1993 Copenhagen | C-4 500 m |
| Silver medal – second place | 1993 Copenhagen | C-4 1000 m |
| Silver medal – second place | 1997 Dartmouth | C-4 1000 m |
| Silver medal – second place | 2003 Gainesville | C-2 1000 m |
| Silver medal – second place | 2009 Dartmouth | C-4 200 m |
| Bronze medal – third place | 1997 Dartmouth | C-4 500 m |
| Bronze medal – third place | 1998 Szeged | C-4 200 m |
| Bronze medal – third place | 1998 Szeged | C-4 500 m |
| Bronze medal – third place | 1999 Milan | C-2 500 m |
| Bronze medal – third place | 2001 Poznań | C-4 200 m |
| Bronze medal – third place | 2002 Seville | C-2 500 m |
| Bronze medal – third place | 2010 Poznań | C-2 500 m |
| Disqualified | 2003 Gainesville | C-2 500 m |
| Disqualified | 2003 Gainesville | C-4 200 m |
| Disqualified | 2003 Gainesville | C-4 500 m |

Aleksandr Viktorovich Kostoglod (Russian: Александр Викторович Костоглод, born 31 May 1974) is a Soviet-born, Russian sprint canoeist who has competed since the early 1990s. Competing in four Summer Olympics, he won three medals, with two silvers (2004: C-2 1000 m, 2008: C-2 500 m) and one bronze (2004: C-2 500 m). Kostoglod is a six-time world champion gold medallist in the Canadian canoe (C) events.

Kostoglod did not take up canoeing until the age of fourteen, at the suggestion of family friend and double world champion Vladimir Ladosha. Within a year he was champion of the USSR in his age group. By 18 he was senior national champion and competing at the Barcelona Olympics, He was disappointed to finish tenth in the C-1 1000 m but has since admitted that as a youngster he was relying on his natural strength to make up for his lack of technique. It did not help that his coach Alexander Abramiants was excluded from the Unified Team delegation to Barcelona.

He won the first of his six World Championship gold medals in 1994, at the age of 20, in Mexico City. In 1998, with Maxim Opalev now representing Russia in the C-1 events, Kostoglod teamed up with Aleksandr Kovalyov for the C-2. The pairing was an immediate success, winning two consecutive world 1000 m titles in 1998 and 1999. His other three medals have all come in the C-4 events. Three medals he won at the 2003 championships in Gainesville were stripped from Kostoglod when his teammate Sergey Ulegin tested positive for doping.

However, with no C-4 event on the schedule, Olympic medals were to prove more elusive. At the 2000 Sydney Games, he and Kovalyov finished fourth in the C-2 1000m final, missing out on a medal by just 0.14 sec. At the 2004 Athens Olympics they were finally rewarded with two medals, silver in the C-2 1000 m and bronze in the C-2 500 m.

In 2006, Kostoglod and Kovalyov came fifth at the European Championships and sixth at the World Championships in the C-2 1000 m. For the C-2 500 m events however Kostoglod was partnered instead by Ulegin. Together they became both European and world champions, finishing over a second ahead of their nearest challengers, the German pairing of Nuck and Holtz, in both finals. Kostoglod won a silver in the C-2 500 m event with Ulegin at the 2008 Summer Olympics in Beijing.

Kostoglod is 185 cm (6 ft 1 in) tall and weighs 93 kg (205 lb).
