= Gita Dodova =

Bulgarian triple jumper

Gita Dodova (Bulgarian: Гита Додова) (born 2 May 1982 in Plovdiv) is a Bulgarian triple jumper. She competed at the 2008 Olympic Games without reaching the final. Her personal best jump is 14.24 metres, achieved in July 2008 in Argos Orestiko.
