= Adnan Aliev =

Bulgarian canoeist

Adnan Aliev (Bulgarian: Аднан Алиев) (born 14 November 1983) is a Bulgarian sprint canoer who competed in the late 2000s. At the 2008 Summer Olympics in Beijing, paired with Deyan Georgiev, he finished seventh in the C-2 500 m event while being eliminated in the semifinals of the C-2 1000 m event.
