= 2006 ICF Canoe Sprint World Championships =

Canoe racing event in Szeged, Hungary

- Host city: Szeged, Hungary
- Dates: August 17–20, 2006

The 2006 ICF Canoe Sprint World Championships were held in Szeged, Hungary, from August 17 to 20 2006. This was the second time the city had hosted the championships, doing so previously in 1998.

Men race as individuals, pairs and quads over 200 m, 500 m and 1000 m in both Canoe (Canadian) (C) and Kayak (K) events, giving a total of 18 gold medals. Women compete for only 9 gold medals as they race in kayak events only.

This was the 35th championships in canoe sprint.

== Highlights ==
Host nation Hungary won twelve of the twenty-seven gold medals. Germany, who had topped the medal table in Zagreb in 2005, took four golds, as did Russia.

Hungary's medal haul included victories in all nine women's finals, Natasa Janics and Katalin Kovács winning six titles each.

In the men's races, Mexican Everardo Cristóbal shocked the top Europeans with victory in the C-1 1000 m final, giving Mexico their first-ever world championship gold medal. The K-1 1000 m, the Blue Riband event, was won by Markus Oscarsson of Sweden.

Germany's Ronald Rauhe won three gold medals to give him a career total of ten. Hungarian György Kolonics, who holds the (men's) record for paddlers currently in competition, won the fourteenth gold medal of his career in the C-2 1000 m final. Russia's Maksim Opalev won his eleventh title. Other perennial favourites such as Andreas Dittmer, Eirik Verås Larsen and Adam van Koeverden however were unable to repeat previous successes. Germany won their first-ever C-4 title (1000 m). In the men's K-4 races, however, no German boats made the podium – the first time that had happened since 1977. Special mention should also go to the Czech Petr Procházka, the oldest man at the championships, who took gold in the C-4 200 m final.

== Medal summary ==
=== Men's ===
Non-Olympic classes

==== Canoe ====
Event	Gold		Silver		Bronze	
C-1 200 m	Nikolay Lipkin (RUS)	39.789	Valentin Demyanenko (UKR)	40.137	Jevgenij Cuklin (LTU)	40.441
C-1 500 m	Maksim Opalev (RUS)	1:49.727	Yuriy Cheban (UKR)	1:50.459	Wenjun Yang (CHN)	1:50.603
C-1 1000 m	Everardo Cristóbal (MEX)	4:07.855	Andreas Dittmer (GER)	4:10.741	Attila Vajda (HUN)	4:11.347
C-2 200 m	Russia; Evgeny Ignatov; Ivan Shtyl	36.494	Germany; Christian Gille; Tomasz Wylenzek	36.978	Lithuania; Raimundas Labuckas; Tomas Gadelkis	37.058
C-2 500 m	Russia; Alexander Kostoglod; Sergey Ulegin	1:41.520	Germany; Stefan Holtz; Robert Nuck	1:42.792	Hungary; György Kozmann; György Kolonics	1:42.942
C-2 1000 m	Hungary; György Kozmann; György Kolonics	3:43.781	Canada; Attila Buday; Tamas Buday Jr.	3:46.151	Ukraine; Maksym Prokopenko; Sergiy Bezugliy	3:46.769
C-4 200 m	Czech Republic; Petr Procházka; Jiří Heller; Jan Břečka; Petr Fuksa	34.052	Belarus; Konstantin Shcharbak; Dzmitry Rabchanka; Aleksandr Vauchetskiy; Dzmitry Vaitsishkin	34.132	Hungary; Pál Sarudi; Márton Joób; Gábor Horváth; Péter Balázs	34.336
C-4 500 m	Belarus; Dzmitry Rabchanka; Dzmitry Vaitsishkin; Konstantin Shcharbak; Aleksandr Vauchetskiy	1:31.820	Poland; Łukasz Woszczyński; Paweł Baraszkiewicz; Marcin Grzybowski; Pawel Skowronski	1:32.360	Romania; Gabriel Talpă; Florin Mironcic; Loredan Popa; Silviu Simioncencu	1:33.710
C-4 1000 m	Germany; Robert Nuck; Stephan Breuing; Stefan Holtz; Thomas Lück	3:27.422	Canada; Andrew Russell; Thomas Hall; Kyle Jeffery; Dmitri Joukovski	3:28.394	Belarus; Aliaksandr Kurliandchyk; Aliaksandr Zhukouski; Aliaksandr Bahdanovich; Andrei Bahdanovich	3:28.880

==== Kayak ====
Event	Gold		Silver		Bronze	
K-1 200 m	Ronald Rauhe (GER)	35.200	Carlos Pérez (ESP)	35.396	Mykola Kremer (UKR)	35.516
K-1 500 m	Marek Twardowski (POL)	1:38.596	Anton Ryakhov (RUS)	1:38.698	Lutz Altepost (GER)	1:39.832
K-1 1000 m	Markus Oscarsson (SWE)	3:39.359	Tim Brabants (GBR)	3:39.419	Ben Fouhy (NZL)	3:39.443
K-2 200 m	Germany; Ronald Rauhe; Tim Wieskötter	32.660	Poland; Marek Twardowski; Adam Wysocki	32.804	Serbia; Dragan Zorić; Ognjen Filipović	32.912
K-2 500 m	Germany; Ronald Rauhe; Tim Wieskötter	1:27.791	Canada; Richard Dessureault-Dober; Andrew Willows	1:28.631	Hungary; Gábor Kucsera; Zoltán Kammerer	1:29.063
K-2 1000 m	Hungary; Gábor Kucsera; Zoltán Kammerer	3:17.791	Germany; Rupert Wagner; Andreas Ihle	3:19.075	Poland; Tomasz Górski; Adam Seroczyński	3:19.837
K-4 200 m	Serbia; Milan Đenadić; Ognjen Filipović; Bora Sibinkić; Dragan Zorić	29.965	Hungary; Viktor Kadler; Gergely Gyertyános; Balázs Babella; István Beé	30.033	Russia; Sergey Kosilov; Konstantin Vishnyakov; Stephan Shevchuk; Sergey Khovanskiy	30.401
K-4 500 m	Slovakia; Richard Riszdorfer; Michal Riszdorfer; Róbert Erban; Erik Vlček	1:20.606	Hungary; Attila Csamangó; Gábor Bozsik; Attila Boros; Márton Sik	1:21.188	Poland; Adam Wysocki; Paweł Baumann; Przemysław Gawrych; Tomasz Mendelski	1:21.536
K-4 1000 m	Hungary; Ákos Vereckei; Roland Kökény; Lajos Gyökös; Gábor Horváth	2:56.523	Poland; Marek Twardowski; Tomasz Mendelski; Paweł Baumann; Adam Wysocki	2:57.873	Belarus; Vadzim Makhneu; Dziamyan Turchyn; Aleksey Abalmasov; Raman Piatrushenka	2:57.897

=== Women's ===
Non-Olympic classes

==== Kayak ====
Event	Gold		Silver		Bronze	
K-1 200 m	Tímea Paksy (HUN)	40.203	Špela Ponomarenko (SLO)	40.947	Karen Furneaux (CAN)	41.071
K-1 500 m	Dalma Benedek (HUN)	1:52.287	Josefa Idem (ITA)	1:53.265	Zhong Hongyan (CHN)	1:53.307
K-1 1000 m	Dalma Benedek (HUN)	4:04.683	Katrin Wagner-Augustin (GER)	4:06.933	Michaela Mrůzková (CZE)	4:07.293
K-2 200 m	Hungary; Katalin Kovács; Nataša Janić	37.423	Germany; Katrin Wagner-Augustin; Fanny Fischer	37.919	Finland; Jenni Honkanen; Anne Rikala	37.983
K-2 500 m	Hungary; Katalin Kovács; Nataša Janić	1:41.998	Czech Republic; Jana Blahová; Michaela Mrůzková	1:43.408	Germany; Fanny Fischer; Gesine Ruge	1:43.432
K-2 1000 m	Hungary; Katalin Kovács; Nataša Janić	3:48.982	China; Zhu Minyuan; Yang Yali	3:49.756	Belarus; Hanna Pushkova-Areshka; Natalya Bandarenko	3:51.664
K-4 200 m	Hungary; Tímea Paksy; Melinda Patyi; Nataša Janić; Katalin Kovács	34.650	Germany; Judith Hörmann; Nicole Reinhardt; Carolin Leonhardt; Conny Waßmuth	35.090	Sweden; Josefin Nordlöw; Sofia Paldanius; Karin Johansson; Anna Karlsson	36.046
K-4 500 m	Hungary (HUN); Krisztina Fazekas; Tímea Paksy; Nataša Janić; Katalin Kovács	1:31.763	Germany (GER); Katrin Wagner-Augustin; Carolin Leonhardt; Conny Waßmuth; Judith Hörmann	1:31.817	Romania (ROM); Mariana Ciobanu; Lidia Talpă; Florica Vulpeş; Alina Platon	1:34.535
K-4 1000 m	Hungary (HUN); Nataša Janić; Alexandra Keresztesi; Katalin Kovács; Tímea Paksy	3:23.488	Germany (GER); Carolin Leonhardt; Miriam Frenken; Tanja Schuck; Silke Hörmann	3:24.106	China (CHN); Yu Lamei; Wang Feng; Zhang Jinmei; He Jing	3:25.012

== Medal table ==
Rank	Nation	Gold	Silver	Bronze	Total
1	Hungary	12	2	4	18
2	Germany	4	9	2	15
3	Russia	4	1	1	6
4	Poland	1	3	2	6
5	Belarus	1	1	3	5
6	Czech Republic	1	1	1	3
7	Serbia	1	0	1	2
7	Sweden	1	0	1	2
9	Mexico	1	0	0	1
9	Slovakia	1	0	0	1
11	Canada	0	3	1	4
12	Ukraine	0	2	2	4
13	China	0	1	3	4
14	Great Britain	0	1	0	1
14	Italy	0	1	0	1
14	Slovenia	0	1	0	1
14	Spain	0	1	0	1
18	Lithuania	0	0	2	2
18	Romania	0	0	2	2
20	Finland	0	0	1	1
20	New Zealand	0	0	1	1
Totals (21 entries)		27	27	27	81
