= Tomasz Wylenzek =

German sprint canoeist (born 1983)

Medal record

Men's canoe sprint

Representing Germany

Olympic Games
Gold medal – first place	2004 Athens	C-2 1000 m
Silver medal – second place	2008 Beijing	C-2 1000 m
Bronze medal – third place	2008 Beijing	C-2 500 m

World Championships
Gold medal – first place	2005 Zagreb	C-2 500 m
Gold medal – first place	2005 Zagreb	C-2 1000 m
Gold medal – first place	2007 Duisburg	C-2 1000 m
Gold medal – first place	2009 Dartmouth	C-2 1000 m
Gold medal – first place	2011 Szeged	C-2 1000 m
Silver medal – second place	2005 Zagreb	C-2 200 m
Silver medal – second place	2006 Szeged	C-2 200 m
Silver medal – second place	2007 Duisburg	C-2 200 m
Bronze medal – third place	2007 Duisburg	C-2 500 m
Bronze medal – third place	2010 Poznań	C-4 1000 m

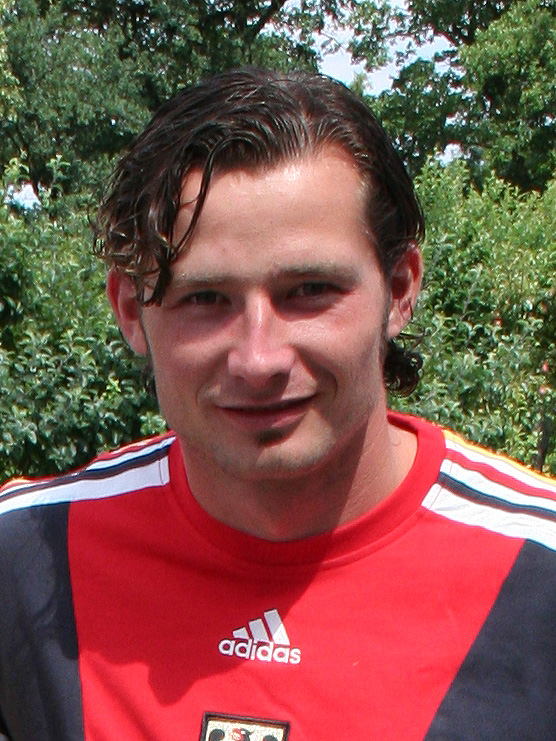
Tomasz Wylenzek Olympic Champion Canoe Sprint

Tomasz Wylenzek (Polish: Tomasz Wylenżek) (born 9 January 1983 in Nowe Chechło, Silesia, Poland) is a German sprint canoeist who has competed since the early 2000s.

Wylenzek won two junior world championship titles in 2001 at Curitiba, Brazil. The following year, still only 19, he was promoted to the German senior squad as C-2 partner for the more experienced Christian Gille. At the 2002 World Championships in Seville, they finished seventh in the 500 m final.

At Wylenzek's first Olympics in Athens, he and Gille won a surprise gold in the C-2 1000 m event.

In 2005 Gille and Wylenzek completely dominated the C-2 event, showing that their Athens victory was no fluke. A clean sweep of medals (200 m, 500 m and 1000 m) at the European Championships in Poznań, Poland, in May was followed by two golds (500 m and 1000 m) at the World Championships in Zagreb.

2006 proved a disappointment after the highs of the previous two years. Gille and Wylenzek lost out to Stefan Holtz and Robert Nuck in the German C-2 500 m trial and were therefore unable to defend their European and world titles over that distance. Wylenzek was philosophical as they lost their other titles too, coming away with just two silver medals at the major championships (European C-2 1000 m and world C-2 200 m).

Wylenzek won two more Olympic medals at Beijing in 2008 with a silver in the C-1 1000 m and a bronze in the C-2 500 m events. since those games, he has won two more world championships medals with a gold in 2009 (C-2 1000 m) and a bronze in 2010 (C-4 1000 m).

Wylenzek lives in Essen. He is 183 centimetres (6 feet 0 inches) tall and weighs 85 kg (187 lb).
