= Lajos Gyökös =

Hungarian canoeist

Medal record

Men's canoe sprint

World Championships
Gold medal – first place	2006 Szeged	K-4 1000 m
Silver medal – second place	2007 Pontevedra	K-4 1000 m

Lajos Gyökös is a Hungarian sprint canoer who competed in the mid-2000s. He won a gold medal in the K-4 1000 m event at the 2006 ICF Canoe Sprint World Championships in Szeged.
