= Gyula Kajner =

Hungarian canoeist

Medal record

Men's canoe sprint

World Championships
Gold medal – first place	1995 Duisburg	K-4 200 m
Gold medal – first place	1998 Szeged	K-4 200 m
Gold medal – first place	1999 Milan	K-4 200 m
Gold medal – first place	2001 Poznań	K-4 200 m
Bronze medal – third place	1990 Poznań	K-4 500 m

Gyula Kajner is a Hungarian sprint canoer who competed from the early 1990s to the early 2000s. He won five medals at the ICF Canoe Sprint World Championships with four golds (K-4 200 m: 1995, 1998, 1999, 2001) and a bronze (K-4 500 m: 1990).
