= György Kozmann =

Hungarian canoeist (born 1978)

Medal record

Men's canoe sprint

Olympic Games
Bronze medal – third place	2004 Athens	C-2 1000 m
Bronze medal – third place	2008 Beijing	C-2 1000 m

World Championships
Gold medal – first place	2001 Poznań	C-4 200 m
Gold medal – first place	2001 Poznań	C-4 1000 m
Gold medal – first place	2003 Gainesville	C-4 200 m
Gold medal – first place	2006 Szeged	C-2 1000 m
Gold medal – first place	2007 Dusiburg	C-2 500 m
Silver medal – second place	2001 Poznań	C-4 500 m
Silver medal – second place	2005 Zagreb	C-2 500 m
Bronze medal – third place	1999 Milan	C-4 1000 m
Bronze medal – third place	2003 Gainesville	C-2 1000 m
Bronze medal – third place	2005 Zagreb	C-2 1000 m
Bronze medal – third place	2006 Szeged	C-2 500 m

György Kozmann (born March 23, 1978, in Szekszárd) is a Hungarian sprint canoeist who has competed since the late 1990s. Competing in the 2004 and 2008 Summer Olympics, he won two bronze medals in the C-2 1000 m event.

He has also won eleven medals at the ICF Canoe Sprint World Championships with five golds (C-2 500 m: 2007, C-2 1000 m: 2006, C-4 200 m: 2001, 2003, C-4 1000 m: 2001), two silvers (C-2 500 m: 2005, C-4 500 m: 2001), and four bronzes (C-2 500 m: 2006, C-2 1000 m: 2003, 2005; C-4 1000 m: 1999). From 2003 until 2008, he was the C-2 partner of György Kolonics.

In the European championships Kozmann has been a gold medalist four times - C-4 500 m (2002), C-4 1000 m (2000 and 2002) and C-2 500 m (2004).

Kolonics death came weeks prior to the 2008 Olympics, to what the pair qualified for both the C-2 500 m and the C-2 1000 m events. Kozmann refused to take part in the games, consulted with his coach, friends and Kolonics's friends, then changed his mind. He competed in the C-2 1000 m event with Tamás Kiss, and the pair finished on the third place in the C-2 1000 m final. He later received a Fair Play prize for this from the Hungarian Olympic Committee.

Kozmann is a member of the Atomerőmű SE club and is coached by Attila Szabó. He is 179 centimetres (5 ft 10 in) tall and weighs 83 kg (183 lb).
