= Róbert Hegedűs =

Hungarian canoeist (born 1973)

Medal record

Men's canoe sprint

World Championships
Gold medal – first place	1997 Dartmouth	K-2 200 m
Gold medal – first place	1997 Dartmouth	K-4 500 m
Gold medal – first place	1998 Szeged	K-2 200 m
Gold medal – first place	1998 Szeged	K-4 200 m
Gold medal – first place	1999 Milan	K-2 200 m
Gold medal – first place	1999 Milan	K-4 200 m
Gold medal – first place	2001 Poznań	K-4 200 m
Silver medal – second place	1997 Dartmouth	K-4 200 m
Bronze medal – third place	1994 Mexico City	K-4 500 m
Bronze medal – third place	2002 Seville	K-4 200 m

Róbert Hegedüs (born 19 February 1973) is a Hungarian sprint canoeist who competed from the mid-1990s to early 2000s. He won ten medals at the ICF Canoe Sprint World Championships with seven golds (K-2 200 m: 1997, 1998, 1999; K-4 200 m: 1998, 1999, 2001; K-4 500 m: 1997), a silver (K-4 200 m: 1997), and two bronzes (K-4 200 m: 2002, K-4 500 m: 1994).

Hegedüs also finished ninth in the K-2 1000 m event at the 1996 Summer Olympics in Atlanta.
