= Christian Gille =

German flatwater canoeist

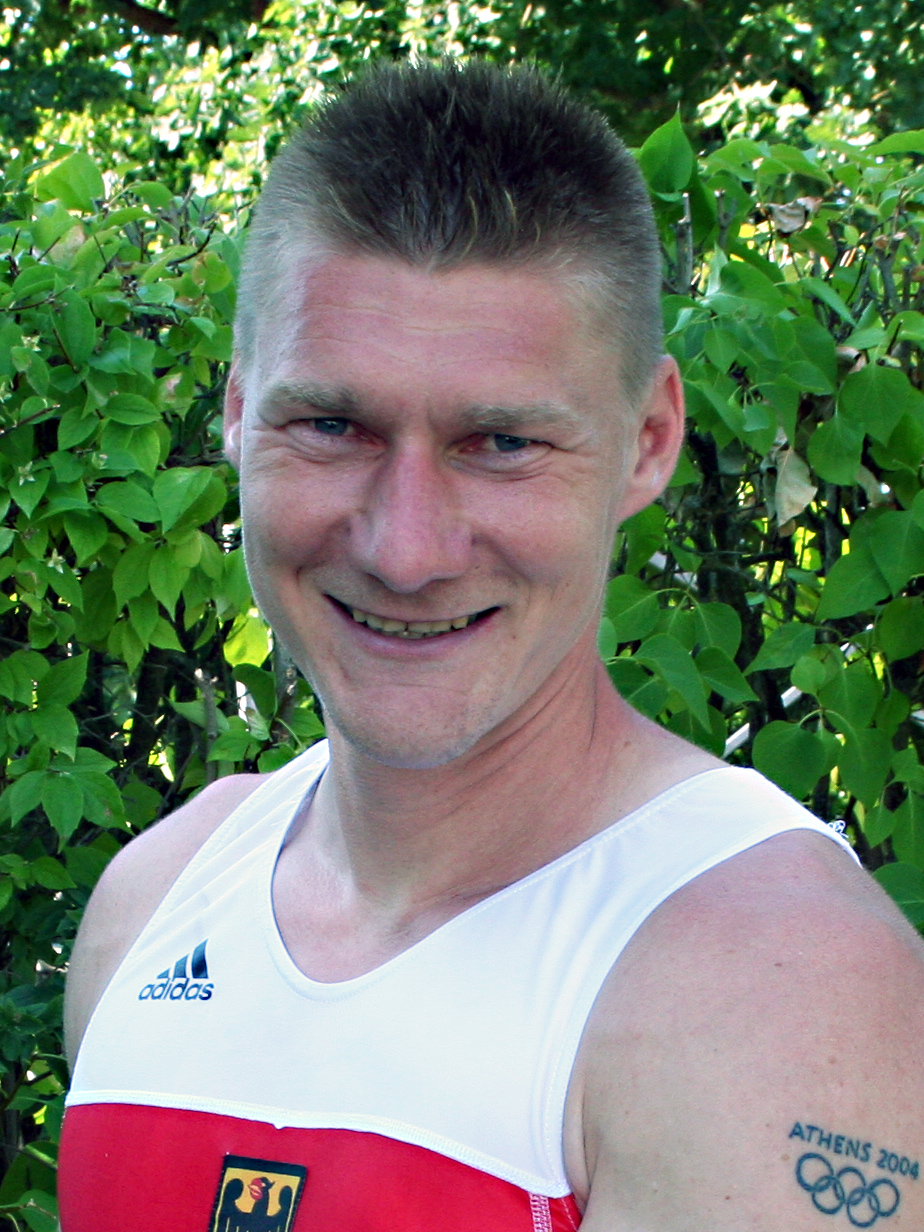
- Christian Gille (2008)

Medal record

Men's canoe sprint

Representing Germany

Olympic Games
Gold medal – first place	2004 Athens	C-2 1000 m
Silver medal – second place	2008 Beijing	C-2 1000 m
Bronze medal – third place	2008 Beijing	C-2 500 m

World Championships
Gold medal – first place	1997 Dartmouth	C-2 200 m
Gold medal – first place	1998 Szeged	C-2 200 m
Gold medal – first place	2005 Zagreb	C-2 500 m
Gold medal – first place	2005 Zagreb	C-2 1000 m
Gold medal – first place	2007 Duisburg	C-2 1000 m
Silver medal – second place	2005 Zagreb	C-2 200 m
Silver medal – second place	2006 Szeged	C-2 200 m
Silver medal – second place	2007 Duisburg	C-2 200 m
Bronze medal – third place	1995 Duisburg	C-4 1000 m
Bronze medal – third place	1997 Dartmouth	C-2 500 m
Bronze medal – third place	1998 Szeged	C-2 500 m
Bronze medal – third place	1999 Milan	C-2 200 m
Bronze medal – third place	2002 Seville	C-1 200 m
Bronze medal – third place	2007 Duisburg	C-2 500 m

Christian Gille (born 6 January 1979 in Wolfen) is a German flatwater canoeist who has competed since the mid-1990s.

A junior world champion (C-4 1000 m) in 1993, he won two senior world championship gold medals with Thomas Zereske in the C-2 200 m sprint in 1997 and 1998. They also competed at the Sydney Olympics in 2000, placing fifth in the C-2 500 m final.

In 2002 Gille won the only C-1 world championship medal of his career. He crossed the line in fourth place in the C-1 200 m final in Seville, Spain, but was later awarded the bronze medal after Ukrainian Dmytro Sablin tested positive for cannabis. Of more significance for the future however was the formation that year of a new C-2 partnership with 19-year-old Tomasz Wylenzek. They finished third in the European Championships and seventh in the C-2 500 m in Seville.

Two years later, at the 2004 Summer Olympics, they won a surprise gold medal in the C-2 1000m. Gille wore a black armband in memory of his former partner Thomas Zereske who had died earlier that summer.

In 2005 Gille and Wylenzek completely dominated the C-2 event. A clean sweep of medals (200 m, 500 m and 1000 m) at the European Championships in Poznań, Poland, in May was followed by two golds (500m and 1000m) at the World Championships in Zagreb.

2006 proved a disappointment after the highs of the previous two years. Replaced by Stefan Holtz and Robert Nuck as Germany's C-2 500 m representatives, they were therefore unable to defend their European and world titles over that distance. They also lost their other titles in competition, coming away with just two silver medals at the major championships (European C-2 1000 m and world C-2 200 m), compared with the five golds of 2005.

Gille won two more Olympic medals at Beijing in 2008 with a silver in the C-2 1000 m and a bronze in the C-2 500 m events.

Gille is a member of the Leipzig club. He is 1.84 m (6 ft 0 in) tall and weighs 87 kilograms (192 lb).
