= Tomasz Górski (canoeist) =

Polish canoeist

Medal record

Men's canoe sprint

World Championships
| Bronze medal – third place | 2006 Szeged | K-2 1000 m |

Tomasz Górski is a Polish sprint canoer who competed in the mid-2000s. He won a bronze medal in the K-2 1000 m event at the 2006 ICF Canoe Sprint World Championships in Szeged.
