= Aliaksandr Kurliandchyk =

Belarusian canoeist

Medal record

Men's canoe sprint

World Championships
Silver medal – second place	2001 Poznań	C-4 1000 m
Bronze medal – third place	2002 Seville	C-4 1000 m
Bronze medal – third place	2005 Zagreb	C-4 200 m
Bronze medal – third place	2006 Szeged	C-4 1000 m

Aliaksandr Kurliandchyk (born November 25, 1971) is a Belarusian sprint canoer who competed from 2001 to 2006. He won four medals at the ICF Canoe Sprint World Championships with a silver (C-4 1000 m: 2001) and three bronzes (C-4 200 m: 2005, C-4 1000 m: 2002, 2006).

Kurliandchyk also finished sixth the C-2 500 m event at the 2004 Summer Olympics in Athens.
