= Gábor Horváth (canoeist, born 1971) =

Hungarian sprint canoeist (born 1971)

Personal information
- Nationality: Hungarian
- Born: 15 November 1971 (age 54) Budapest, Hungary

Sport
- Sport: Canoe sprint
- Club: Bp. Honvéd
Medal record
Men's canoe sprint
Representing Hungary
Event	1st	2nd	3rd
Olympic Games	2	1	0
World Championships	3	4	6
European Championships	2	3	1
Total	7	8	7
Olympic Games
Gold medal – first place	2000 Sydney	K-4 1000 m
Gold medal – first place	2004 Athens	K-4 1000 m
Silver medal – second place	1996 Atlanta	K-4 1000 m
World Championships
Gold medal – first place	1999 Milan	K-4 1000 m
Gold medal – first place	2006 Szeged	K-4 1000 m
Silver medal – second place	1993 Copenhagen	K-4 1000 m
Silver medal – second place	1997 Dartmouth	K-4 200 m
Silver medal – second place	1999 Milan	K-2 500 m
Silver medal – second place	2001 Poznań	K-4 1000 m
Bronze medal – third place	1993 Copenhagen	K-4 500 m
Bronze medal – third place	1994 Mexico City	K-4 500 m
Bronze medal – third place	1997 Dartmouth	K-2 500 m
Bronze medal – third place	1998 Szeged	K-2 500 m
Bronze medal – third place	1999 Milan	K-4 500 m
Bronze medal – third place	2002 Seville	K-4 200 m

Gábor Horváth (born 15 November 1971 in Budapest) is a Hungarian sprint canoeist who competed from 1993 to 2006. Competing in three Summer Olympics, he won three medals in the K-4 1000 m event with two golds (2000, 2004) and one silver (1996).

A member of the Budapest Honvéd FC club, Horváth also had outstanding success at the canoeing World Championships.

Horvath is a member of the Budapest Honvéd FC club.

== Awards ==
Orders and special awards

- Cross of Merit of the Republic of Hungary – Gold Cross (1996)
- Order of Merit of the Republic of Hungary – Officer's Cross (2000)
- Order of Merit of the Republic of Hungary – Commander's Cross (2004)
