= Deyan Georgiev =

Bulgarian canoeist

Deyan Georgiev (Bulgarian: Деян Георгиев) (born 28 February 1984 in Vidin) is a Bulgarian sprint canoer who competed in the late 2000s. At the 2008 Summer Olympics in Beijing, paired with Adnan Aliev, he finished seventh in the C-2 500 m event while being eliminated in the semifinals of the C-2 1000 m event.
