= José Alfredo Bea =

Spanish canoeist (born 1969)

Medal record

Men's canoe sprint

World Championships
Silver medal – second place	2001 Poznań	C-2 1000 m

José Alfredo Bea García (born October 14, 1969) is a Spanish sprint canoer and marathon canoeist who competed from the early 1990s to the mid-2000s (decade). He won a silver medal in the C-2 1000 m event at the 2001 ICF Canoe Sprint World Championships in Poznań.

Bea competed in four Summer Olympics, earning his best finish of fourth in the C-2 500 m event at Sydney in 2000, when he was paired alongside David Mascató.
