= David Mascató =

Spanish canoeist

Medal record

Men's canoe sprint

World Championships
Silver medal – second place	2001 Poznań	C-2 1000 m

David Mascato García (born 13 October 1975) is a Spanish sprint canoeist and marathon canoeist who competed in the early to mid-2000s. He won a silver medal in the C-2 1000 m event at the 2001 ICF Canoe Sprint World Championships in Poznań.

Mascato also competed in two Summer Olympics, earning his best finish of fourth in the C-2 500 m event at Sydney in 2000, when he was paired alongside José Alfredo Bea.
