= István Beé =

Hungarian canoeist (born 1972)

Medal record

Men's canoe sprint

World Championships
Gold medal – first place	1998 Szeged	K-4 200 m
Gold medal – first place	1999 Milan	K-4 200 m
Gold medal – first place	2001 Poznań	K-4 200 m
Gold medal – first place	2005 Zagreb	K-4 200 m
Gold medal – first place	2007 Duisburg	K-4 200 m
Silver medal – second place	2006 Szeged	K-4 200 m
Bronze medal – third place	1994 Mexico City	K-2 1000 m
Bronze medal – third place	2002 Seville	K-4 200 m

István Beé (born 4 July 1972, in Budapest) is a Hungarian sprint canoer who competed from the mid-1990s to the late 2000s. He won eight medals at the ICF Canoe Sprint World Championships with five golds (K-4 200 m: 1998, 1999, 2001, 2005, 2007), a silver (K-4 200 m: 2006), and two bronzes (K-2 1000 m: 1994, K-4 200 m: 2002).

Beé also competed in two Summer Olympics, earning his best finish of fifth in the K-4 1000 m event at Beijing in 2008.

He is a member of the Budapest Honvéd FC club. He is 185 cm (6 ft 1 in) tall and weighs 87 kg (192 lb).
