= Gergely Gyertyános =

Hungarian canoeist

Medal record

Men's canoe sprint

World Championships
Gold medal – first place	2005 Zagreb	K-4 200 m
Silver medal – second place	2006 Szeged	K-4 200 m
Bronze medal – third place	2007 Duisburg	K-1 200 m

Gergely Gyertyános is a Hungarian sprint canoer who has competed since the mid-2000s. He won a complete set of medals at the ICF Canoe Sprint World Championships with a gold in 2005 (K-4 200 m), a silver in 2006 (K-4 200 m), and a bronze in 2007 (K-1 200 m).

In recent years, he has been working as the coach of the national kayak team of Burma.
