= Balázs Babella =

Hungarian canoeist (born 1978)

Medal record

Men's canoe sprint

World Championships
Gold medal – first place	2005 Zagreb	K-4 200 m
Gold medal – first place	2007 Duisburg	K-4 200 m
Silver medal – second place	2006 Szeged	K-4 200 m

Balázs Babella (born 21 June 1978 in Vác ) is a Hungarian flatwater canoer and former world champion in the four-man kayak K-4 200 m, winning golds in 2005 and 2007.

Babella is a member of the Pécs Canoe Club.

Babella has since retired from international competition and is currently in Singapore coaching its Kayak and Canoe National Team.
