= Attila Kugler =

Hungarian canoeist

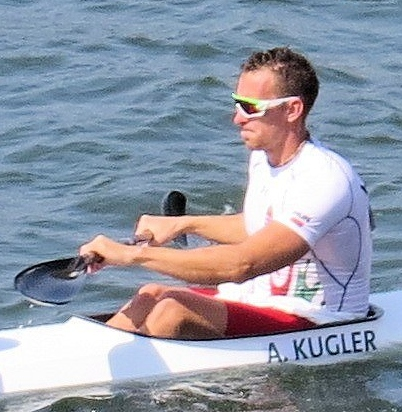
- Kugler at the 2016 Olympics

Personal information
- Born: 16 September 1986 (age 39) Budapest, Hungary
- Height: 186 cm (6 ft 1 in)
- Weight: 89 kg (196 lb)

Sport
- Sport: Canoe sprint
- Club: Vasas SC
- Coached by: László Rákóczi; Gábor Czeglédi; Botond Storcz

Attila Kugler (born 16 September 1986) is a Hungarian canoeist. He placed 11th in the K-4 1000 metres event at the 2016 Summer Olympics.
