= Péter Molnár (canoeist) =

Hungarian canoeist (born 1986)

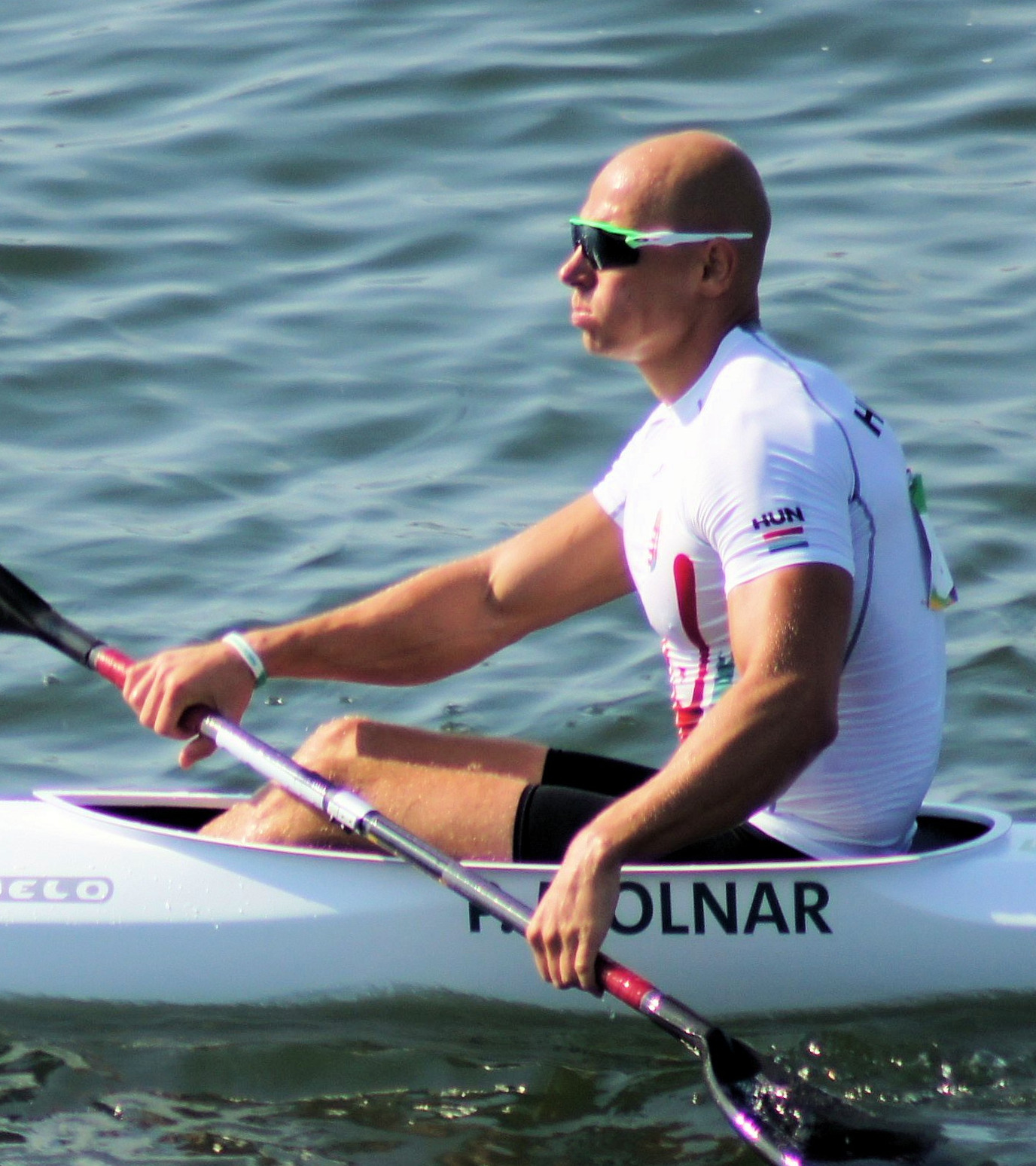
- Molnár at the 2016 Olympics

Personal information
- Nationality: Hungarian
- Born: 16 February 1986 (age 40) Vác, Hungary
- Education: Semmelweis University
- Height: 188 cm (6 ft 2 in)
- Weight: 88 kg (194 lb)

Sport
- Country: Hungary
- Sport: Canoe sprint
- Club: Budapesti Honved SE
- Coached by: Viktor Huvos (personal); Botond Storcz (national)
Medal record
Representing Hungary
World Championships
Gold medal – first place	2015 Milan	K-2 200 m
Bronze medal – third place	2013 Duisburg	K-1 4×200 m
Bronze medal – third place	2018 Montemor-o-Velho	K-4 500 m
European Games
Bronze medal – third place	2015 Baku	K-2 200 m
European Championships
Gold medal – first place	2016 Moscow	K-4 500 m
Silver medal – second place	2008 Milan	K-1 200 m
Silver medal – second place	2011 Belgrade	K-1 200 m
Bronze medal – third place	2008 Milan	K-2 200 m

Péter Molnár (born 16 February 1986) is a Hungarian canoeist who had his best achievements in two-men and four-men events, partnering with Sándor Tótka. Together they won a world title in 2015 and a European title in 2016 and placed fourth at the 2016 Olympics. Individually Molnár won silver medals at the 2008 and 2011 European Championships and placed 15th at the 2016 Olympics.
