= Mátyás Sáfrán =

Hungarian sprint canoeist (born 1986)

Medal record

Men's canoe sprint

World Championships
| Bronze medal – third place | 2007 Duisburg | C-4 1000 m |
| Bronze medal – third place | 2011 Szeged | C-4 1000 m |

European Championships
| Gold medal – first place | 2011 Belgrade | C-4 1000 m |
| Gold medal – first place | 2009 Brandenburg | C-2 1000 m |
| Silver medal – second place | 2007 Pontevedra | C-4 1000 m |
| Bronze medal – third place | 2006 Racice | C-4 1000 m |

Mátyás Sáfrán (born January 23, 1986, in Székesfehérvár) is a Hungarian sprint canoeist who has competed since 2007. He twice won the gold medal at the European Championships, the C-2 1000 m event in 2009 and the C-4 1000 m event in 2011.

He also won bronze in the C-4 1000 m event at the 2007 ICF Canoe Sprint World Championships in Duisburg and also in 2011 ICF Canoe Sprint World Championships in Szeged.

At the 2008 Summer Olympics in Beijing, Sáfrán was eliminated in the semifinals of the C-2 500 m event.
