= Gabriella Szabó =

Romanian canoeist (born 1986)

Personal information
- Nationality: Hungarian
- Born: 14 August 1986 (age 40) Budapest, Hungary

Sport
- Sport: Canoe sprint
- Club: KSI (1997–2006); Dunaferr SE (2006–2008); Bp. Honvéd (2008–)
- Coached by: Ferenc Csipes
Medal record
Event	1st	2nd	3rd
Olympic Games	3	1	0
World Championships	9	1	1
European Championships	3	2	0
European Games	0	0	0
Total	15	4	1
Olympic Games
Gold medal – first place	2012 London	K-4 500 m
Gold medal – first place	2016 Rio de Janeiro	K-2 500 m
Gold medal – first place	2016 Rio de Janeiro	K-4 500 m
Silver medal – second place	2008 Beijing	K-4 500 m
World Championships
Gold medal – first place	2009 Dartmouth	K-2 500 m
Gold medal – first place	2010 Poznań	K-2 500 m
Gold medal – first place	2010 Poznań	K-2 1000 m
Gold medal – first place	2011 Szeged	K-4 500 m
Gold medal – first place	2013 Duisburg	K-2 1000 m
Gold medal – first place	2013 Duisburg	K-4 500 m
Gold medal – first place	2014 Moscow	K-2 500 m
Gold medal – first place	2014 Moscow	K-4 500 m
Gold medal – first place	2015 Milan	K-2 500 m
Silver medal – second place	2015 Milan	K-4 500 m
Bronze medal – third place	2007 Duisburg	K-2 1000 m
European Championships
Gold medal – first place	2011 Belgrade	K-2 1000 m
Gold medal – first place	2014 Brandenburg	K-2 500 m
Gold medal – first place	2014 Brandenburg	K-4 500 m
Silver medal – second place	2011 Belgrade	K-4 500 m
Silver medal – second place	2012 Zagreb	K-4 500 m

Gabriella Szabó (born 14 August 1986) is a Hungarian sprint canoer who has competed since the late 2000s.

== Career ==
She won the silver medal in the K-4 500 m event at the 2008 Summer Olympics in Beijing.

Szabó also won five medals at the ICF Canoe Sprint World Championships with four golds (K-2 500 m: 2009, 2010; K-2 1000 m: 2010; K-4 500 m: 2011) and a bronze (K-2 1000 m: 2007).

Szabó also won a gold medal at the London Olympics in the Kayak Four (K4) 500m team event with Danuta Kozák, Katalin Kovács and Krisztina Fazekas for Hungary

In June 2015, she competed in the inaugural European Games, for Hungary in canoe sprint, more specifically, Women's K-4 500m with Anna Kárász, Danuta Kozák, and Ninetta Vad. She earned a gold medal.

In August 2016, she also won two gold medals at the Summer Olympics in Rio de Janeiro in the Kayak Double (K2) 500m with Danuta Kozák and in the Kayak Four (K4) 500m team event with Danuta Kozák, Tamara Csipes and Krisztina Fazekas Zur for Hungary. In both teams she served as the stroke for the unit.

== Awards ==
- Junior Príma award (2008)
- Perpetual champion of Hungarian Kayak-Canoe (2012)
- Honorary Citizen of Zugló (2012)
- Hungarian university athlete of the year (1): 2015

Orders and special awards

- Order of Merit of the Republic of Hungary – Knight's Cross (2008)
- Order of Merit of Hungary – Officer's Cross (2012)
- Order of Merit of Hungary – Commander's Cross (2016)
