= Dóra Lucz =

Hungarian canoeist (born 1994)

Personal information
- Full name: Dóra Liebscher-Lucz
- Born: 26 September 1994 (age 31) Budapest, Hungary
- Height: 1.71 m (5 ft 7 in)
- Spouse: Tom Liebscher (m. 2022)
- Relative: Anna Lucz (sister)

Sport
- Country: Hungary
- Sport: Canoe sprint
Medal record
Women's canoe sprint
Representing Hungary
European Championships
Gold medal – first place	2017 Plovdiv	K-1 200 m
Gold medal – first place	2017 Plovdiv	K-4 500 m
Gold medal – first place	2021 Poznań	K-4 500 m
Silver medal – second place	2021 Poznań	K-1 200 m

Dóra Lucz (born 26 September 1994) is a retired Hungarian canoeist. She competed in the women's K-1 200 metres event at the 2020 Summer Olympics.

She married German canoeist Tom Liebscher in 2022.

Her sister is Hungarian canoeist Anna Lucz.
