= 2000 Canoe Sprint European Championships =

International canoeing and kayaking event

The 2000 Canoe Sprint European Championships were held in Poznań, Poland.

== Medal overview ==
=== Men ===
Event	Gold	Time	Silver	Time	Bronze	Time
C1-200m	(Ukraine) Dmitry Sabin	41.596	(Germany) Andreas Dittmer	41.724	(Czech Republic) Martin Doktor	41.744
C2-200m	(Poland); Paweł Baraszkiewicz; Daniel Jędraszko	38.533	(Czech Republic); Petr Procházka; Jan Břečka	38.737	(Russia); Aleksandr Artemida; Konstantin Fomichev	38.985
C4-200m	(Czech Republic); Jan Břečka; Petr Procházka; Karel Kožíšek; Petr Fuksa	35.515	(Hungary); Ervin Hoffman; Miklós Buzál; Attila Végh; György Kolonics	35.727	(Ukraine); Alexander Mostovenko; Mikhail Slivinskiy; Sergiy Klimniuk; Dmitry Sabin	35.951
K1-200m	(Lithuania) Alvydas Duonėla	36.967	(Ukraine) Oleksiy Slivinskiy	36.991	(Spain) Jaime Acuña	36.999
K2-200m	(Ukraine); Mykhaylo Luchnik; Mykola Zaichenkov	33.722	(Germany); Tim Wieskötter; Ronald Rauhe	33.890	(Slovakia); Rastislav Kužel; Martin Chorváth	33.942
K4-200m	(Slovakia); Rastislav Kužel; Juraj Kadnár; Andrej Wiebauer; Martin Chorváth	31.618	(Ukraine); Mykola Zaichenkov; Mykhaylo Luchnik; Andriy Borzukov; Oleksiy Slivinskiy	31.974	(Hungary); Gyula Kajner; István Beé; Róbert Hegedűs; Vince Fehérvári	32.106
C1-500m	(Russia) Maksim Opalev	1:49.107	(Germany) Andreas Dittmer	1:49.147	(Bulgaria) Nikolay Bukhalov	1:50.517
C2-500m	(Poland); Daniel Jędraszko; Paweł Baraszkiewicz	1:42.309	(Romania); Iosif Anisim; Ionel Averian	1:42.687	(Russia); Alexander Kovalev; Alexander Kostoglod	1.43.941
C4-500m	(Russia); Vladimir Ladosha; Pavel Konovalov; Andrey Kabanov; Vladislav Polzounov	1:33.090	(Romania); Chirac Marcov; Gheorghe Andriev; Robert Vinturis; Silviu Simioncencu	1:33.648	(Hungary); Gábor Furdok; Gábor Ivan; Sándor Malomsoki; Csaba Hüttner	1:33.696
K1-500m	(Hungary) Ákos Vereckei	1:37.944	(Israel) Michael Kolganov	1:38.400	(Bulgaria) Petar Merkov	1:39.144
K2-500m	(Germany); Tim Wieskötter; Ronald Rauhe	1:29.859	(Czech Republic); Pavel Holubar; Radek Zaruba	1:30.117	(Hungary); István Beé; Vince Fehérvári	1:31.269
K4-500m	(Germany); Stefan Ulm; Jan Schäfer; Mark Zabel; Björn Bach	1:21.513	(Slovakia); Juraj Tarr; Richard Riszdorfer; Erik Vlček; Róbert Erban	1:21.945	(Russia); Anatoly Tishchenko; Andrey Shchegolikhin; Oleg Gorobiy; Yevgeny Salakhov	1:22.203
C1-1000m	(Czech Republic) Martin Doktor	4:02.227	(Germany) Andreas Dittmer	4:03.067	(Russia) Maksim Opalev	4:06.637
C2-1000m	(Poland); Paweł Baraszkiewicz; Michał Gajownik	3:43.665	(Romania); Iosif Anisim; Ionel Averian	3:43.815	(Russia); Alexander Kostoglod; Alexander Kovalev	3:43.869
C4-1000m	(Hungary); György Zala; György Kozmann; Gábor Furdok; Gábor Ivan	3:22.784	(Romania); Gheorghe Andriev; Silviu Simioncencu; Chirac Marcov; Robert Vinturis	3:23.954	(Czech Republic); Petr Netušil; Jan Machac; Petr Fuksa; Viktor Jirasky	3:24.338
K1-1000m	(Israel) Michael Kolganov	3:36.502	(Bulgaria) Petar Merkov	3:36.682	(Germany) Lutz Liwowski	3:37.876
K2-1000m	(Norway); Eirik Verås Larsen; Nils Olav Fjeldheim	3:18.299	(Hungary); Krisztián Veréb; Krisztián Bártfai	3:19.199	(Russia); Oleg Gorobiy; Yevgeny Salakhov	3:19.349
K4-1000m	(Germany); Jan Schäfer; Mark Zabel; Björn Bach; Stefan Ulm	2:58.890	(Hungary); Ákos Vereckei; Botond Storcz; Gábor Horváth; Zoltán Kammerer	3:00.498	(Bulgaria); Milko Kazanov; Andrian Dushev; Petar Merkov; Petar Sibinkić	3:00.846

=== Women ===
Event	Gold	Time	Silver	Time	Bronze	Time
K1-200m	(Hungary) Rita Kőbán	42.624	(Italy) Josefa Idem	42.676	(Poland) Elżbieta Urbańczyk	42.824
K2-200m	(Poland); Beata Sokołowska; Aneta Pastuszka	39.306	(Germany); Katrin Kieseler; Birgit Fischer	40.854	(Spain); Beatriz Manchón; Belen Sanchez	41.210
K4-200m	(Hungary); Szilvia Szabó; Erzsébet Viski; Kinga Bóta; Katalin Kovács	35.768	(Germany); Katrin Wagner; Birgit Fischer; Manuela Mucke; Anett Schuck	36.588	(Spain); Beatriz Manchón; Ana María Penas; Izaskun Aramburu; Belen Sanchez	36.816
K1-500m	(Hungary) Rita Kőbán	1:51.584	(Germany) Katrin Wagner	1:52.824	(Poland) Elżbieta Urbańczyk	1:54.094
K2-500m	(Poland); Beata Sokołowska; Aneta Pastuszka	1:40.150	(Hungary); Kinga Bóta; Katalin Kovács	1:40.348	(Germany); Birgit Fischer; Katrin Kieseler	1:42.616
K1-1000m	(Italy) Josefa Idem	4:04.210	(Hungary) Kinga Bóta	4:04.744	(Germany) Manuela Mucke	4:06.777
K2-1000m	(Germany); Birgit Fischer; Katrin Kieseler	3:44.434	(Hungary); Erzsébet Viski; Ágnes Szadovszki	3:48.058	(Poland); Aneta Pastuszka; Beata Sokołowska	3:48.358
K4-500m	(Germany); Birgit Fischer; Katrin Wagner; Anett Schuck; Manuela Mucke	1:31.755	(Hungary); Szilvia Szabó; Erzsébet Viski; Rita Kőbán; Katalin Kovács	1:31.895	(Spain); Belen Sanchez; Beatriz Manchón; Ana María Penas; Izaskun Aramburu	1:34.895

=== Medal table ===
Rank	Nation	Gold	Silver	Bronze	Total
1	Germany	5	7	3	15
1	Hungary	5	7	3	15
3	Poland	5	0	3	8
4	Czech Republic	2	2	2	6
5	Ukraine	2	2	1	5
6	Russia	2	0	6	8
7	Slovakia	1	1	1	3
8	Israel	1	1	0	2
8	Italy	1	1	0	2
10	Lithuania	1	0	0	1
10	Norway	1	0	0	1
12	Romania	0	4	0	4
13	Bulgaria	0	1	3	4
14	Spain	0	0	4	4
Totals (14 entries)		26	26	26	78
