= 1999 Canoe Sprint European Championships =

International canoeing and kayaking event

The 1999 Canoe Sprint European Championships were held in Zagreb, Croatia.

== Medal overview ==
=== Men ===
Event	Gold	Time	Silver	Time	Bronze	Time
C1-200m	(Russia) Maxim Opalev	40.425	(Czech Republic) Martin Doktor	40.585	(Slovakia) Slavomír Kňazovický	40.775
C2-200m	(Poland); Daniel Jędraszko; Paweł Baraszkiewicz	37.851	(Romania); Ionel Averian; Mitică Pricop	38.031	(Czech Republic); Petr Procházka; Jan Břečka	38.341
C4-200m	(Czech Republic); Jan Břečka; Petr Fuksa; Karel Kožíšek; Petr Procházka	35.649	(Romania); Ionel Averian; Gheorghe Andriev; Florin Popescu; Mitică Pricop	35.809	(Russia); Alexei Volkonski; Konstantin Fomichev; Alexander Kostoglod; Ignat Kovalev	35.979
K1-200m	(Israel) Michael Kolganov	35.908	(Federal Republic of Yugoslavia) Ognjen Filipović	36.018	(Czech Republic) Pavel Hottmar	36.228
K2-200m	(Poland); Marek Twardowski; Adam Wysocki	33.515	(Norway); Nils Olav Fjeldheim; Andreas Gjersøe	33.975	(Russia); Sergei Verlin; Anatoly Tishchenko	33.985
K4-200m	(Russia); Vitaliy Gankin; Alexander Ivanik; Andrei Tissin; Roman Zarubin	31.269	(Ukraine); Andriy Borzukov; Mykhaylo Luchnik; Oleksiy Slivinskiy; Mykola Zaichenkov	31.969	(Slovakia); Martin Chorváth; Jan Divinec; Andrej Wiebauer; Rastislav Kužel	31.999
C1-500m	(Russia) Maxim Opalev	1:49.810	(Czech Republic) Martin Doktor	1:51.160	(Hungary) Gábor Furdok	1:53.070
C2-500m	(Romania); Florin Popescu; Gheorghe Andriev	1:42.103	(Russia); Alexander Kovalev; Alexander Kostoglod	1:42.283	(Spain); José Alfredo Bea; David Mascato	2:43.883
C4-500m	(Russia); Konstantin Fomichev; Alexei Volkonski; Ignat Kovalev; Andrey Kabanov	1:31.868	(Romania); Gheorghe Andriev; Florin Popescu; Mitică Pricop; Florin Huidu	1:31.866	(Czech Republic); Petr Fuksa; Petr Netušil; Viktor Jirasky; Jan Machac	1:33.176
K1-500m	(Bulgaria) Petar Merkov	1:39.098	(Poland) Grzegorz Kotowicz	1:39.418	(Israel) Michael Kolganov	1:39.498
K2-500m	(Poland); Marek Twardowski; Adam Wysocki	1:28.852	(Hungary); Ákos Vereckei; Zoltán Kammerer	1:29.362	(Slovakia); Juraj Bača; Michal Riszdorfer	1:29.962
K4-500m	(Russia); Alexander Ivanik; Vitaliy Gankin; Roman Zarubin; Andrei Tissin	1:20.688	(Bulgaria); Petar Merkov; Andrian Dushev; Milko Kazanov; Petar Sibinkić	1:22.258	(Romania); Sorin Petcu; Vasile Curuzan; Marian Sîrbu; Romică Șerban	1:22.558
C1-1000m	(Russia) Maxim Opalev	3:52.363	(Czech Republic) Martin Doktor	3:55.053	(Poland) Paweł Baraszkiewicz	3:56.263
C2-1000m	(Russia); Alexander Kovalev; Alexander Kostoglod	3:37.802	(Romania); Gheorghe Andriev; Florin Popescu	3:38.352	(Germany); Peter John; Patrick Schulze	3:41.062
C4-1000m	(Russia); Konstantin Fomichev; Alexei Volkonski; Ignat Kovalev; Andrey Kabanov	3:17.597	(Romania); Chirac Marcov; Mitică Pricop; Samil Grigore; Iosif Anisim	3:19.227	(Ukraine); Nikolay Dimakov; Dmitry Sabin; Roman Bundz; Leonid Kamlochuk	3:19.247
K1-1000m	(Hungary) Ákos Vereckei	3:32.741	(France) Babak Amir-Tahmasseb	3:33.551	(Israel) Michael Kolganov	3:34.181
K2-1000m	(Slovakia); Michal Riszdorfer; Juraj Bača	3:12.259	(Hungary); Zoltán Kammerer; Ákos Vereckei	3:14.169	(Poland); Marek Twardowski; Adam Wysocki	3:14.709
K4-1000m	(Poland); Grzegorz Kotowicz; Adam Seroczyński; Dariusz Białkowski; Marek Witkowski	2:55.199	(Bulgaria); Milko Kazanov; Andrian Dushev; Petar Sibinkić; Petar Merkov	2:56.049	(Slovakia); Andrej Wiebauer; Juraj Kadnár; Martin Chorváth; Rastislav Kužel	2:57.499

=== Women ===
Event	Gold	Time	Silver	Time	Bronze	Time
K1-200m	(Italy) Josefa Idem	41.322	(Hungary) Rita Kőbán	41.582	(Spain) Belen Sanchez	42.462
K2-200m	(Poland); Aneta Pastuszka; Beata Sokołowska	39.454	(Hungary); Erzsébet Viski; Szilvia Szabó	40.245	(Russia); Natalya Gouilly; Yelena Tissina	40.374
K4-200m	(Russia); Galina Poryvaeva; Natalya Gouilly; Tatyana Tishchenko; Olga Tishchenko	35.959	(Hungary); Erzsébet Viski; Szilvia Szabó; Kinga Bóta; Katalin Kovács	36.459	(Czech Republic); Katerina Hlucha; Milena Pergnerová; Šárka Borkovcová; Barbora Futerova	36.949
K1-500m	(Italy) Josefa Idem	1:51.072	(Hungary) Katalin Kovács	1:52.302	(Poland) Elżbieta Urbańczyk	1:52.832
K2-500m	(Poland); Beata Sokołowska; Aneta Pastuszka	1:40.757	(Hungary); Katalin Kovács; Szilvia Szabó	1:41.507	(Spain); Izaskun Aramburu; Beatriz Manchón	1:42.607
K4-500m	(Hungary); Katalin Kovács; Szilvia Szabó; Kinga Bóta; Erzsébet Viski	1:35.126	(Spain); Belen Sanchez; Ana María Penas; Beatriz Manchón; Izaskun Aramburu	1:36.796	(Russia); Galina Poryvaeva; Olga Tishchenko; Tatyana Tishchenko; Natalya Gouilly	1:37.506
K1-1000m	(Italy) Josefa Idem	3:55.459	(Hungary) Katalin Kovács	3:56.809	(Poland) Elżbieta Urbańczyk	3:58.319
K2-1000m	(Poland); Aneta Pastuszka; Beata Sokołowska	3:38.579	(Hungary); Andrea Barocsi; Katalin Kovács	3:38.819	(Romania); Elena Radu; Sanda Toma	3:40.429

=== Medal table ===
Rank	Nation	Gold	Silver	Bronze	Total
1	Russia	9	1	4	14
2	Poland	7	1	4	12
3	Italy	3	0	0	3
4	Hungary	2	9	1	12
5	Romania	1	5	2	8
6	Czech Republic	1	3	4	8
7	Bulgaria	1	2	0	3
8	Slovakia	1	0	4	5
9	Israel	1	0	2	3
10	Spain	0	1	3	4
11	Ukraine	0	1	1	2
12	France	0	1	0	1
12	Norway	0	1	0	1
12	Yugoslavia	0	1	0	1
15	Germany	0	0	1	1
Totals (15 entries)		26	26	26	78
