= 2001 Canoe Sprint European Championships =

International canoeing and kayaking event

The 2001 Canoe Sprint European Championships were held in Milan, Italy.

== Medal overview ==
=== Men ===
Event	Gold	Time	Silver	Time	Bronze	Time
C1-200m	(Ukraine) Dmitry Sabin	41.257	(Russia) Maksim Opalev	41.397	(Germany) Andreas Dittmer	41.445
C2-200m	(Romania); Mikhail Vartolemei; Ionel Averian	37.885	(Poland); Paweł Baraszkiewicz; Daniel Jędraszko	38.149	(Hungary); György Kozmann; Imre Feil	38.329
C4-200m	(Czech Republic); Karel Kožíšek; Jan Břečka; Petr Fuksa; Petr Procházka	33.832	(Romania); Ionel Averian; Mikhail Vartolemei; Florin Popescu; Mitică Pricop	34.364	(Poland); Andrzej Jezierski; Daniel Jędraszko; Paweł Baraszkiewicz; Michał Gajownik	34.508
K1-200m	(Germany) Ronald Rauhe	36.063	(Hungary) Vince Fehérvári	36.459	(Czech Republic) Pavel Hottmar	36.627
K2-200m	(Germany); Tim Wieskötter; Ronald Rauhe	32.832	(Hungary); Vince Fehérvári; Róbert Hegedűs	32.880	(Poland); Marek Twardowski; Adam Wysocki	32.988
K4-200m	(Hungary); Gábor Horváth; Róbert Hegedűs; Vince Fehérvári; István Beé	30.709	(Russia); Yevgeny Salakhov; Denys Tourtchenkov; Roman Zarubin; Oleg Gorobiy	31.253	(Romania); Romică Șerban; Vasile Curuzan; Marian Baban; Geza Magyar	31.301
C1-500m	(Hungary) György Kolonics	1:50.284	(Germany) Andreas Dittmer	1:50.408	(Russia) Maksim Opalev	1:51.944
C2-500m	(Romania); Mitică Pricop; Florin Popescu	1:42.892	(Russia); Alexander Kostoglod; Alexander Kovalev	1:43.764	(Spain); José Alfredo Bea; David Mascato	1:44.212
C4-500m	(Russia); Konstantin Fomichev; Vladislav Polzounov; Vladimir Ladosha; Andrey Kabanov	1:32.550	(Romania); Ionel Averian; Mikhail Vartolemei; Florin Popescu; Iosif Anisim	1:32.582	(Poland); Marcin Grzybowski; Adam Ginter; Roman Rynkiewicz; Marcin Kobierski	1:33.894
K1-500m	(Hungary) Ákos Vereckei	1:39.505	(Israel) Michael Kolganov	1:39.949	(Spain) Emilio Merchán Alonso	1:41.053
K2-500m	(Germany); Tim Wieskötter; Ronald Rauhe	1:29.868	(Hungary); Krisztián Bártfai; Krisztián Veréb	1:30.488	(Poland); Adam Wysocki; Marek Twardowski	1:30.520
K4-500m	(Russia); Denys Tourtchenkov; Alexander Ivanik; Andrei Tissin; Roman Zarubin	1:20.905	(Slovakia); Richard Riszdorfer; Michal Riszdorfer; Erik Vlček; Juraj Bača	1:21.057	(Belarus); Vadzim Makhneu; Raman Piatrushenka; Aliaksei Abalmasau; Aleksey Skurkovskiy	1:21.933
C1-1000m	(Germany) Andreas Dittmer	3:52.858	(Hungary) György Kolonics	3:53.578	(Czech Republic) Martin Doktor	3:57.210
C2-1000m	(Romania); Mitică Pricop; Florin Popescu	3:36.320	(Spain); José Alfredo Bea; David Mascato	3:36.724	(Russia); Alexander Kovalev; Alexander Kostoglod	3:37.052
C4-1000m	(Russia); Alexei Volkonski; Vladimir Ladosha; Roman Kruglyakov; Konstantin Fomichev	3:16.879	(Hungary); Gábor Ivan; Béla Belicza; György Zala; György Kozmann	3:18.175	(Poland); Roman Rynkiewicz; Michał Gajownik; Andrzej Jezierski; Adam Ginter	3:18.799
K1-1000m	(Germany) Lutz Liwowski	3:30.238	(Hungary) Ákos Vereckei	3:30.658	(Norway) Eirik Verås Larsen	3:30.922
K2-1000m	(Norway); Nils Olav Fjeldheim; Eirik Verås Larsen	3:14.382	(Hungary); Krisztián Veréb; Krisztián Bártfai	3:14.364	(Germany); Marc Westphalen; Marco Herszel	3:16.130
K4-1000m	(Slovakia); Juraj Bača; Erik Vlček; Richard Riszdorfer; Michal Riszdorfer	2:53.307	(Germany); Andreas Ihle; Mark Zabel; Björn Bach; Stefan Ulm	2:53.471	(Belarus); Aleksey Skurkovskiy; Aliaksei Abalmasau; Raman Piatrushenka; Vadzim Makhneu	2:54.883

=== Women ===
Event	Gold	Time	Silver	Time	Bronze	Time
K1-200m	(Hungary) Szilvia Szabó	42.336	(Poland) Elżbieta Urbańczyk	42.348	(Germany) Katrin Wagner	43.448
K2-200m	(Spain); Sonia Molanes Costa; Beatriz Manchón	38.405	(Hungary); Erzsébet Viski; Kinga Dékány	38.593	(Poland); Beata Sokołowska; Aneta Pastuszka	39.145
K4-200m	(Hungary); Kinga Dékány; Krisztina Fazekas; Erzsébet Viski; Kinga Bóta	36.115	(Spain); Belen Sanchez; Teresa Portela Rivas; María Isabel García; Ana María Penas	36.315	(Poland); Karolina Sadalska; Aneta Pastuszka; Dorota Kuczkowska; Joanna Skowroń	36.831
K1-500m	(Hungary) Katalin Kovács	1:51.163	(Italy) Josefa Idem	1:51.375	(Germany) Katrin Wagner	1:53.015
K2-500m	(Hungary); Kinga Bóta; Szilvia Szabó	1:41.307	(Spain); Sonia Molanes Costa; Beatriz Manchón	1:42.511	(Belarus); Natalya Bondarenko; Olesya Bakunova	1:43.911
K4-500m	(Hungary); Kinga Bóta; Erzsébet Viski; Szilvia Szabó; Katalin Kovács	1:34.094	(Germany); Anett Schuck; Manuela Mucke; Katrin Wagner; Nadine Opgen-Rhein	1:35.714	(Spain); Belen Sanchez; María Isabel García; Teresa Portela Rivas; Ana María Penas	1:35.834
K1-1000m	(Italy) Josefa Idem	3:54.190	(Hungary) Katalin Kovács	3:54.858	(Germany) Katrin Wagner	3:55.810
K2-1000m	(Germany); Manuela Mucke; Nadine Opgen-Rhein	3:38.419	(Poland); Beata Sokołowska; Joanna Skowroń	3:39.507	(Hungary); Krisztina Fazekas; Ágnes Szabó	3:39.555
K4-1000m	(Ukraine); Inna Osypenko; Tetyana Semykina; Hanna Balabanova; Nataliya Feklisova	3:22.528	(Belarus); Olesya Bakunova; Natalya Bondarenko; Svetlana Vakula; Alena Bets	3:22.636	(Hungary); Kinga Dékány; Eszter Rasztótsky; Katalin Móni; Ágnes Szabó	3:23.304

== Medal table ==
Rank	Nation	Gold	Silver	Bronze	Total
1	Hungary	8	9	3	20
2	Germany	6	3	5	14
3	Russia	3	3	2	8
4	Romania	3	2	1	6
5	Ukraine	2	0	0	2
6	Spain	1	3	3	7
7	Italy	1	1	0	2
7	Slovakia	1	1	0	2
9	Czech Republic	1	0	2	3
10	Norway	1	0	1	2
11	Poland	0	3	7	10
12	Belarus	0	1	3	4
13	Israel	0	1	0	1
Totals (13 entries)		27	27	27	81
