= 1997 Canoe Sprint European Championships =

International canoeing and kayaking event

The 1997 Canoe Sprint European Championships were held in Plovdiv, Bulgaria.

== Medal overview ==
=== Men ===
Event	Gold	Time	Silver	Time	Bronze	Time
C1-200m	(Slovakia) Slavomír Kňazovický	40.118	(Belarus) Aleksandr Maseikov	40.658	(Ukraine) Mikhail Slivinskiy	40.963
C2-200m	(Russia); Vladimir Ladosha; Pavel Konovalov	35.998	(Hungary); Miklós Buzál; Attila Végh	36.328	(Bulgaria); Stanimir Atanasov; Dimitar Atanasov	36.563
C4-200m	(Russia); Vladimir Ladosha; Pavel Konovalov; Vladislav Polzounov; Alexander Kostoglod	33.528	(Slovakia); Peter Páleš; Slavomír Kňazovický; Juraj Filip; Csaba Orosz	33.973	(Czech Republic); Pavel Bednář; Petr Procházka; Petr Fuksa; Tomáš Křivánek	34.013
K1-200m	(Hungary) Vince Fehérvári	34.973	(Poland) Grzegorz Kotowicz	35.818	(Italy) Ezio Caldognetto	36.183
K2-200m	(Hungary); Róbert Hegedűs; Vince Fehérvári	32.058	(Romania); Romică Șerban; Florin Scoica	32.628	(Poland); Maciej Freimut; Adam Wysocki	32.743
K4-200m	(Hungary); Gyula Kajner; Vince Fehérvári; Zoltán Páger; István Beé	29.023	(Russia); Anatoly Tishchenko; Oleg Gorobiy; Sergei Verlin; Alexander Ivanik	29.213	(Poland); Piotr Markiewicz; Grzegorz Kotowicz; Adam Wysocki; Marek Witkowski	29.473
C1-500m	(Bulgaria) Nikolay Bukhalov	1:55.487	(Czech Republic) Martin Doktor	1:56.217	(Hungary) György Kolonics	1:56.662
C2-500m	(Poland); Daniel Jędraszko; Paweł Baraszkiewicz	1:48.658	(Hungary); György Kolonics; Csaba Horváth	1:49.442	(Russia); Pavel Konovalov; Vladimir Ladosha	1:50.937
C4-500m	(Hungary); Csaba Hüttner; Csaba Horváth; László Szuszkó; Béla Belicza	1:35.654	(Romania); Florin Popescu; Cosmin Pașca; Antonel Borșan; Marcel Glăvan	1:37.063	(Bulgaria); Rumen Nikolov; Georgi Nikolov; Martin Marinov; Blagovest Stoyanov	1:37.588
K1-500m	(Hungary) Botond Storcz		(Poland) Grzegorz Kotowicz		(Romania) Geza Magyar	
K2-500m	(Italy); Luca Negri; Beniamino Bonomi	1:32.699	(Poland); Adam Wysocki; Maciej Freimut	1:33.449	(Hungary); Róbert Hegedűs; Péter Almási	1:33.654
K4-500m	(Hungary); Róbert Hegedűs; Zoltán Kammerer; Ákos Vereckei; Botond Storcz	1:23.244	(Poland); Mariusz Wieczorek; Grzegorz Andziak; Paweł Łakomy; Piotr Olszewski	1:23.619	(Russia); Sergei Verlin; Alexander Ivanik; Oleg Gorobiy; Anatoly Tishchenko	1:24.414
C1-1000m	(Czech Republic) Martin Doktor	3:58.143	(Bulgaria) Nikolay Bukhalov	3:59.818	(Germany) Patrick Schulze	4:00.733
C2-1000m	(Hungary); Csaba Horváth; György Kolonics	3:36.195	(Romania); Marcel Glăvan; Antonel Borșan	3:38.120	(Germany); Stefan Utess; Lars Kober	3:38.385
C4-1000m	(Romania); Florin Popescu; Marcel Glăvan; Antonel Borșan; Cosmin Pașca	3:15.911	(Hungary); László Szuszkó; Csaba Hüttner; Gábor Furdok; Gábor Balgovits	3:17.191	(Poland); Piotr Midloch; Daniel Jędraszko; Paweł Midloch; Paweł Baraszkiewicz	3:18.511
K1-1000m	(Hungary) Botond Storcz	3:30.380	(Norway) Knut Holmann	3:30.535	(Italy) Beniamino Bonomi	3:35.605
K2-1000m	(Italy); Luca Negri; Antonio Rossi	3:11.546	(Poland); Dariusz Białkowski; Grzegorz Kotowicz	3:12.091	(Bulgaria); Milko Kazanov; Andrian Dushev	3:13.751
K4-1000m	(Hungary); Zoltán Kammerer; Péter Almási; Zsombor Borhi; Róbert Hegedűs	2:54.848	(Slovakia); Martin Hluško; Michal Riszdorfer; Zsolt Bogdány; Juraj Bača	2:55.888	(Poland); Piotr Markiewicz; Adam Seroczyński; Marek Witkowski; Grzegorz Kaleta	2:56.043

=== Women ===
Event	Gold	Time	Silver	Time	Bronze	Time
K1-200m	(Italy) Josefa Idem	41.018	(Austria) Ursula Profanter	41.502	(Switzerland) Ingrid Haralamov-Raimann	41.692
K2-200m	(Poland); Elżbieta Urbańczyk; Izabela Dylewska-Światowiak	37.228	(Spain); Izaskun Aramburu; Beatriz Manchón	37.323	(Romania); Mariana Limbău; Raluca Ioniță	37.923
K4-200m	(Romania); Raluca Ioniță; Sanda Toma; Elena Radu; Mariana Limbău	33.778	(Spain); Ana María Penas; Belen Sanchez; Beatriz Manchón; Izaskun Aramburu	33.888	(Russia); Natalya Gouilly; Yelena Tissina; Tatyana Tishchenko; Larissa Peisakhovitch	34.428
K1-500m	(Italy) Josefa Idem	1:57.877	(Hungary) Szilvia Mednyánszky	1:58.692	(Austria) Ursula Profanter	1:58.827
K2-500m	(Spain); Izaskun Aramburu; Beatriz Manchón	1:50.347	(Romania); Sanda Toma; Mariana Limbău	1:50.372	(Italy); Josefa Idem; Rosetta Ravetta	1:50.832
K4-500m	(Romania); Elena Radu; Mariana Limbău; Raluca Ioniță; Sanda Toma	1:34.964	(Hungary); Katalin Kovács; Andrea Barocsi; Szilvia Szabó; Kinga Dékány	1:36.363	(Spain); Belen Sanchez; Izaskun Aramburu; Beatriz Manchón; Ana María Penas	1:36.998
K1-1000m	(Italy) Josefa Idem	3:58.519	(Austria) Ursula Profanter	3:59.373	(Hungary) Kinga Bóta	4:03.183
K2-1000m	(Poland); Elżbieta Urbańczyk; Izabela Dylewska-Światowiak	3:38.860	(Hungary); Katalin Kovács; Andrea Barocsi	3:39.664	(Romania); Sanda Toma; Mariana Limbău	3:40.989

=== Medal table ===
Rank	Nation	Gold	Silver	Bronze	Total
1	Hungary	9	6	3	18
2	Italy	5	0	3	8
3	Poland	3	5	4	12
4	Romania	3	4	3	10
5	Russia	2	1	3	6
6	Spain	1	2	1	4
7	Slovakia	1	2	0	3
8	Bulgaria	1	1	3	5
9	Czech Republic	1	1	1	3
10	Austria	0	2	1	3
11	Belarus	0	1	0	1
11	Norway	0	1	0	1
13	Germany	0	0	2	2
14	Switzerland	0	0	1	1
14	Ukraine	0	0	1	1
Totals (15 entries)		26	26	26	78
