= List of world best times in canoeing =

Listed below are the canoe sprint world best times in Sprint canoe and Sprint kayak events. The ICF only acknowledge world best times set in finals of Olympic Games, World Championships, World Cups, Continental Championships and "other canoe sprint events with acceptable high technical level".

== Men ==
Key to tables: Awaiting ratification Not ratified or later rescinded by ICF Record not kept by ICF

Distance	Event	Record	Canoeist	National federation	Date	Meet	Place	Ref
200 m	MK1	33.37	Gergely Balogh	Hungary	11 June 2026	European Championships	Montemor-o-Velho, Portugal	
200 m	MK2	30.500	Nebojša Grujić; Marko Novaković	Serbia	10 August 2014	World Championship	Moscow, Russia	
200 m	MK4	29.023	Gyula Kajner; Vince Fehérvári; Zoltán Páger; István Beé	Hungary	1997	European Championships	Plovdiv, Bulgaria	
200 m	MC1	37.446	Vadim Korobov	Lithuania	17 July 2016	European U23 Championships	Plovdiv, Bulgaria	
200 m	MC2	35.350	Alexey Korovashkov; Ivan Shtyl	Russia	10 August 2014	World Championships	Moscow, Russia	
200 m	MC4	32.753	Robert Vinturis; Ionel Averian; Marian Ciucu; Cristian Mardale	Romania	1997		Duisburg, Germany	
500 m	MK1	1:35.04	Tom Liebscher	Germany	23 August 2019	World Championships	Szeged, Hungary	
500 m	MK2	1:26.500	Bence Nádas; Sándor Tótka	Hungary	16 July 2017	European Championships	Plovdiv, Bulgaria	
500 m	MK4	1:17.25	Bence Nádas; Bence Fodor; Levente Kurucz; Sándor Tótka	Hungary	11 June 2026	European Championships	Montemor-o-Velho, Hungary	
500 m	MC1	1:43.669	Martin Fuksa	Czech Republic	20 May 2018	World Cup	Szeged, Hungary	
500 m	MC2	1:35.829	Alexey Korovashkov; Ivan Shtyl	Russia	9 August 2014	World Championships	Moscow, Russia	
500 m	MC4	1:29.155	Pavel Petrov; Mikhail Pavlov; Viktor Melantyev; Ivan Shtyl	Russia	9 June 2018	European Championships	Belgrade, Serbia	
1000 m	MK1	3:20.643	Bálint Kopasz	Hungary	3 August 2021	Olympic Games	Tokyo, Japan	
1000 m	MK2	3:04.940	Marko Tomićević; Milenko Zorić	Serbia	9 June 2018	European Championships	Belgrade, Serbia	
1000 m	MK4	2:46.724	Daniel Havel; Lukáš Trefil; Josef Dostál; Jan Štěrba	Czech Republic	10 August 2014	World Championships	Moscow, Russia	
1000 m	MC1	3:41.46	Martin Fuksa	Czech Republic	9 May 2026	World Cup	Szeged, Hungary	
1000 m	MC1	3:41.46	Zakhar Petrov	AIN	9 May 2026	World Cup	Szeged, Hungary	
1000 m	MC2	3:24.995	Serguey Torres; Fernando Jorge	Cuba	3 August 2021	Olympic Games	Tokyo, Japan	
1000 m	MC4	3:10.701	Ilya Pervukhin; Viktor Melantyev; Kirill Shamshurin; Rasul Ishmukhamedov	Russia	9 August 2014	World Championships	Moscow, Russia	
5000 m	MK1	18:00.04	Eirik Verås Larsen	Norway	24 May 2009	World Cup	Poznań, Poland	
5000 m	MC1	20:27.35	Kurt Kuschela	Germany	29 May 2010	World Cup	Szeged, Hungary	
4 × 200 m relay	MK1	2:24.193	Miklós Dudás; Sándor Tótka; Bence Nádas; Dávid Hérics	Hungary	10 August 2014	World Championships	Moscow, Russia	
4 × 200 m relay	MC1	2:43.602	Ivan Shtyl; Andrey Kraitor; Alexey Korovashkov; Nikolay Lipkin	Russia	10 August 2014	World Championships	Moscow, Russia	

== Women ==
Distance	Event	Record	Canoeist	National federation	Date	Meet	Place	Ref
200 m	WK1	37.898	Lisa Carrington	New Zealand	10 August 2014	World Championships	Moscow, Russia	
200 m	WK2	35.869	Anna Kárász; Ninetta Vad	Hungary	10 August 2014	World Championships	Moscow, Russia	
200 m	WK4	33.778	Mariana Limbău; Raluca Ioniță; Sanda Toma; Elena Radu	Romania	6 July 1997	European Championships	Plovdiv, Bulgaria	
200 m	WC1	43.23	Liudmyla Luzan	Ukraine	10 May 2026	World Cup	Szeged, Hungary	
200 m	WC2	41.53	Yarisleidis Cirilo; Yinnoly López	Cuba	9 May 2026	World Cup	Szeged, Hungary	
500 m	WK1	1:46.19	Aimee Fisher	New Zealand	12 May 2024	World Cup	Szeged, Hungary	
500 m	WK2	1:35.785	Lisa Carrington; Caitlin Regal	New Zealand	3 August 2021	Olympic Games	Tokyo, Japan	
500 m	WK4	1:28.219	Gabriella Szabó; Danuta Kozák; Anna Kárász; Ninetta Vad	Hungary	9 August 2014	World Championships	Moscow, Russia	
500 m	WC1	1:59.00	Sun Mengya	China	9 May 2026	World Cup	Szeged, Hungary	
500 m	WC2	1:51.42	Katie Vincent; Laurence Vincent Lapointe	Canada	26 May 2018	World Cup	Duisburg, Germany	
500 m	WC4	1:44.65	Li Shuqi; Yang Li; Sun Mengya; Ma Yanan	China	10 May 2026	World Cup	Szeged, Hungary	
1000 m	WK1	3:49.423	Teneale Hatton	New Zealand	9 August 2014	World Championships	Moscow, Russia	
1000 m	WK2	3:31.645	Justyna Iskrzycka; Paulina Paszek	Poland	9 June 2018	European Championships	Belgrade, Serbia	
1000 m	WK4	3:13.296	Eszter Rasztótsky; Kinga Dékány; Krisztina Fazekas; Natasa Janics	Hungary	13 September 2003	World Championships	Gainesville, United States	
1000 m	WC1	4:24.958	María Mailliard	Chile	26 August 2023	World Championships	Duisburg, Germany	
5000 m	WK1	20:10.1	Bridgitte Hartley	South Africa	10 May 2009	World Cup	Račice, Czech Republic	
5000 m	WC1	25:00.822	Laurence Vincent Lapointe	Canada	2 June 2019	World Cup	Duisburg, Germany	
4 × 200 m relay	WK1	2:47.793	Karolina Naja; Edyta Dzieniszewska; Ewelina Wojnarowska; Marta Walczykiewicz	Poland	10 August 2014	World Championships	Moscow, Russia	

== Mixed ==
Distance	Event	Record	Canoeist	National federation	Date	Meet	Place	Ref
200 m	XK2	33.94	Anna Lucz; Kolos Csizmadia	Hungary	19 September 2021	World Championships	Copenhagen, Denmark	
200 m	XC2	39.10	Irina Andreeva; Ivan Shtyl	Russia	19 September 2021	World Championships	Copenhagen, Denmark	
500 m	XK2	1:32.553	Franziska John; Max Rendschmidt	Germany	2 June 2019	World Cup	Duisburg, Germany	
500 m	XC2	1:44.729	Liu Hao; Sun Mengya	China	2 June 2019	World Cup	Duisburg, Germany	
