= Végh =

Végh is a Hungarian surname. Notable people with the surname include:

- Ágnes Végh (born 1939), Hungarian handball player
- Attila Végh (canoeist), Hungarian sprint canoeist
- Attila Végh (poet), Hungarian poet
- Attila Végh (fighter), Slovak-Hungarian fighter
- Sándor Végh (1912–1997), Hungarian violinist and conductor
- Zoltán Végh (born 1971), Hungarian footballer

== See also ==
- Végh Quartet, Hungarian string quartet
