= Attila Végh (disambiguation) =

Attila Végh (born 1985) is a Hungarian-Slovak mixed martial arts fighter.

Attila Végh may also refer to:

- Attila Végh (canoeist), Hungarian sprint canoer
- Attila Végh (poet) (born 1962), Hungarian poet
