= Vasile Curuzan =

Romanian sprint canoer

Medal record

Men's sprint kayak

Representing Romania

World Championships
Silver medal – second place	2003 Gainesville	K-4 200 m
Silver medal – second place	2003 Gainesville	K-4 500 m
Silver medal – second place	2001 Poznań	K-4 500 m
Bronze medal – third place	1999 Milan	K-4 1000 m

European Championships
Bronze medal – third place	2001 Milan	K-4 200 m
Bronze medal – third place	1999 Zagreb	K-4 500 m

Curuzan Corneli Vasile (born 19 March 1974 in Tulcea), also known as Vasile Curuzan, is a Romanian sprint kayaker who competed from the late 1990s to the mid-2000s. He won four medals at the ICF Canoe Sprint World Championships, two silver in 2003 (in K-4 200 m and K-4 500 m, both with Marian Baban, Alexandru Ceauşu, and Romică Şerban), one silver in 2001 (K-4 500 m with Marian Baban, Geza Magyar, and Romică Şerban) and a bronze in 1999 (K-4 1000 m with Sorin Petcu, Marian Sîrbu, and Romică Şerban).

He also won two bronze medals at the Canoe Sprint European Championships, in 2001 (K-4 200 m with Romică Șerban, Marian Baban and Geza Magyar) and in 1999 (K-4 500 m with Sorin Petcu, Marian Sîrbu and Romică Șerban).

Curuzan also competed in two Summer Olympics, earning his best finish of seventh in the K-4 1000 m event at Athens in 2004 (with Marian Baban, Alexandru Ceauşu and Ștefan Vasile).
