= Andriy Borzukov =

Ukrainian canoeist

Medal record

Men's canoe sprint

World Championships
Gold medal – first place	2003 Gainesville	K-4 200 m
Bronze medal – third place	1994 Mexico City	K-4 200 m

European Championships
Silver medal – second place	1999 Zagreb	K-4 200 m
Silver medal – second place	2000 Poznań	K-4 200 m

Goodwill Games
Bronze medal – third place	1994 Saint Petersburg	K-2 500 m
Bronze medal – third place	1994 Saint Petersburg	K-2 1000 m

Andrey Borzukov (sometimes listed as Andriy Borzukov, born 20 October 1971) is a Ukrainian sprint canoeist who competed from the mid-1990s to the mid-2000s (decade). He won two medals in the K-4 200 m event at the ICF Canoe Sprint World Championships with a gold in 2003 and a bronze in 1994.

Borzukov also competed in the K-4 1000 m event at the 1996 Summer Olympics in Atlanta, but was eliminated in the semifinals.
