= Elżbieta Urbańczyk =

Polish canoeist

Medal record

Women's canoe sprint

Representing Poland

World Championships
Gold medal – first place	1994 Mexico City	K-2 500 m
Silver medal – second place	1995 Duisburg	K-2 500 m
Silver medal – second place	1997 Dartmouth	K-2 200 m
Silver medal – second place	2001 Poznań	K-1 200 m
Bronze medal – third place	1994 Mexico City	K-2 200 m
Bronze medal – third place	1997 Dartmouth	K-2 1000 m
Bronze medal – third place	2002 Seville	K-1 200 m

European Championships
Gold medal – first place	1997 Plovdiv	K2-500 m
Gold medal – first place	1997 Plovdiv	K2-1000 m
Silver medal – second place	2001 Milan	K1-200 m
Bronze medal – third place	1999 Zagreb	K1-500 m
Bronze medal – third place	1999 Zagreb	K1-1000 m
Bronze medal – third place	2000 Poznań	K2-200 m
Bronze medal – third place	2000 Poznań	K1-500 m
Bronze medal – third place	2002 Szeged	K1-200 m

Elżbieta Urbańczyk (born 26 April 1971 in Nowy Dwór Mazowiecki) is a Polish sprint canoer who competed from 1988 to 2002. She won seven medals at the ICF Canoe Sprint World Championships with a gold (K-2 500 m: 1994), three silvers (K-1 200 m: 2001, K-2 200 m: 1997, K-2 500 m: 1995), and three bronzes (K-1 200 m: 2002, K-2 200 m: 1994, K-2 1000 m: 1997).

Urbańczyk also competed in four Summer Olympics, earning her best finish of fifth in the K-1 500 m event at Sydney in 2000.
