= Paweł Baraszkiewicz =

Polish canoeist

Medal record

Men's canoe sprint
Event	1st	2nd	3rd
Olympic Games	0	1	0
World Championships	4	6	4
European Championships	5	5	4
European Games	0	0	0
Total	3	0	2

Olympic Games
Silver medal – second place	2000 Sydney	C-2 500 m

World Championships
Gold medal – first place	1999 Milan	C-2 500 m
Gold medal – first place	2001 Poznań	C-2 200 m
Gold medal – first place	2003 Gainesville	C-2 200 m
Gold medal – first place	2003 Gainesville	C-2 500 m
Silver medal – second place	1997 Dartmouth	C-2 500 m
Silver medal – second place	1998 Szeged	C-2 500 m
Silver medal – second place	1999 Milan	C-2 200 m
Silver medal – second place	2001 Poznań	C-2 500 m
Silver medal – second place	2005 Zagreb	C-1 500 m
Silver medal – second place	2006 Szeged	C-4 500 m
Bronze medal – third place	1997 Dartmouth	C-4 1000 m
Bronze medal – third place	2007 Duisburg	C-2 1000 m
Bronze medal – third place	2010 Poznań	C-2 200 m
Bronze medal – third place	2010 Poznań	C-1 4 x 200 m

European Championships
Gold medal – first place	1997 Plovdiv	C2-500 m
Gold medal – first place	1999 Zagreb	C2-200 m
Gold medal – first place	2000 Poznań	C2-200 m
Gold medal – first place	2000 Poznań	C2-500 m
Gold medal – first place	2000 Poznań	C2-1000 m
Silver medal – second place	2001 Milan	C2-200 m
Silver medal – second place	2004 Poznań	C2-500 m
Silver medal – second place	2004 Poznań	C2-200 m
Silver medal – second place	2005 Poznań	C1-500 m
Silver medal – second place	2011 Belgrade	C-1 500 m
Bronze medal – third place	1997 Plovdiv	C4-1000 m
Bronze medal – third place	1999 Zagreb	C1-1000 m
Bronze medal – third place	2001 Milan	C4-200 m
Bronze medal – third place	2008 Milan	C2-1000 m

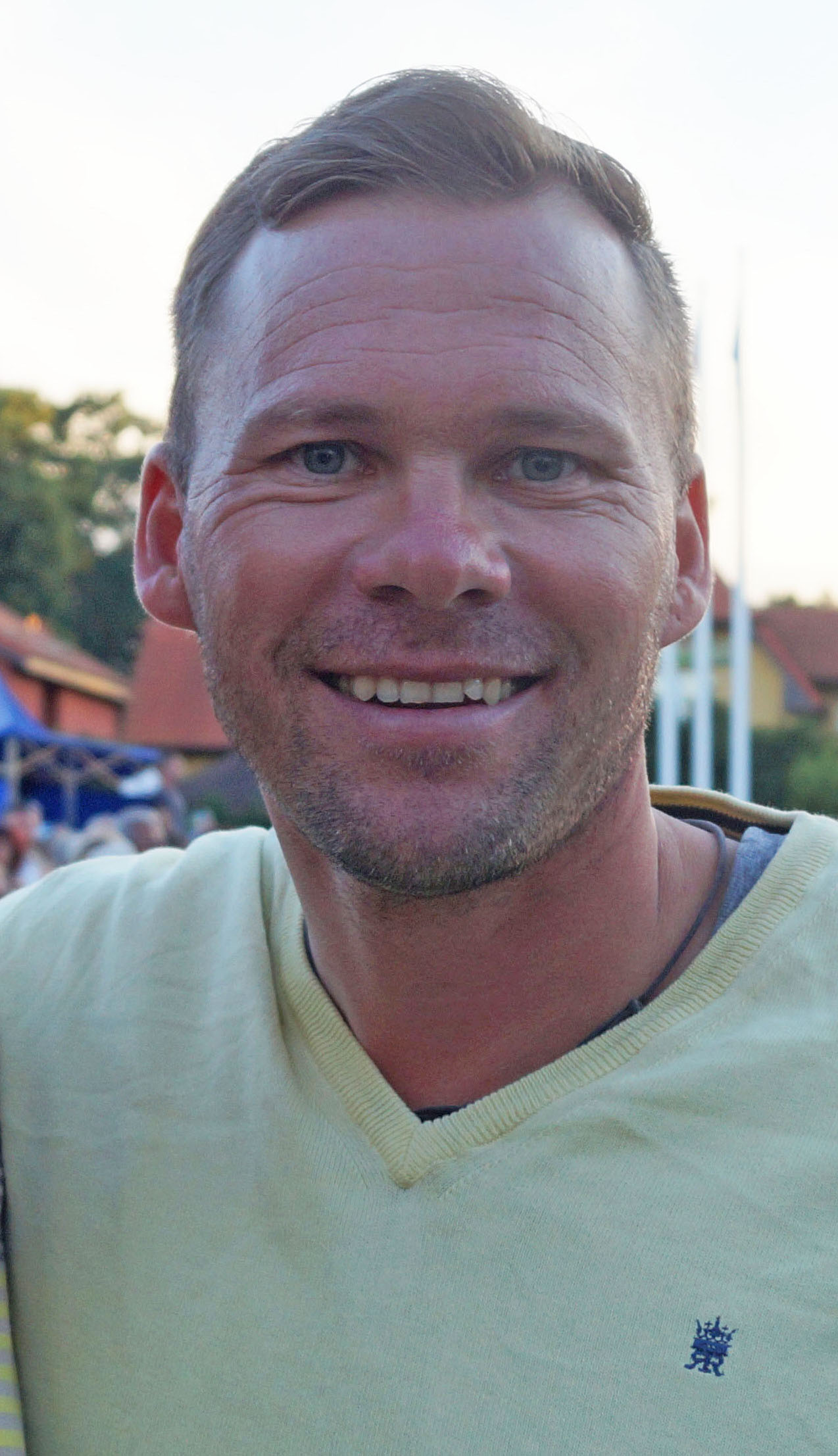

Paweł Baraszkiewicz (born May 20, 1977, in Działdowo) is a Polish sprint canoeist who has competed since the mid-1990s. He has been world champion four times in the Canadian canoe C-2 event with partner Daniel Jędraszko.

Baraszkiewicz debuted at the 1996 Summer Olympics in Atlanta, where, paired with Marcin Kobierski, he was eliminated in the first semifinal of the C-2 500 m event.

They also won a silver medal at the 2000 Summer Olympics in Sydney in the C-2 500 m event. That same year Baraskiewicz also won two C-2 gold medals at the European championships (in the 500 m with Jedrasko and also in the 1000 m with Michał Gajownik).

At the 2004 Summer Olympics in Athens, Baraszkiewicz and Jedrasko disappointingly failed to win a medal. Baraszkiewicz publicly voiced his suspicion that some of their rivals were guilty of doping.

In 2005 Baraszkiewicz switched to the individual C-1 event, winning silver at the 2005 ICF Canoe Sprint World Championships over 500 m.

2006 proved a frustrating season, with three fourth-place finishes in major C-1 finals (European 200 m & 500 m and World Championship 500 m). He did however pick up a world championship silver medal with Poland's four-man C-4 500 m crew. At the end of the season he again became Polish national C-1 champion over all three race distances.

Baraszkiewicz is a member of the Posnania Poznań club. He is 175 cm (5 ft 9 in) tall and weighs 80 kg (180 lb). All told, he has earned as of 2010 a total of fourteen medals at the ICF Canoe Sprint World Championships.

== Awards ==
For hts sport achievements, he received:
Golden Cross of Merit in 2000;
Knight's Cross of the Order of Polonia Restituta (5th Class) in 2007.
