= Paweł Midloch =

Polish canoeist

Medal record

Men's canoe sprint

World Championships
Bronze medal – third place	1997 Dartmouth	C-4 1000 m

European Championships
Bronze medal – third place	1997 Plovdiv	C4-1000 m

Paweł Midloch is a Polish sprint canoer who competed in the late 1990s. He won a bronze medal in the C-4 1000 m event at the 1997 ICF Canoe Sprint World Championships in Dartmouth.
