= Mykola Zaichenkov =

Ukrainian canoeist

Medal record

Men's canoe sprint

World Championships
| Gold medal – first place | 2003 Gainesville | K-4 200 m |
| Bronze medal – third place | 2001 Poznań | K-2 200 m |
| Bronze medal – third place | 2001 Poznań | K-4 200 m |

European Championships
| Gold medal – first place | 2000 Poznań | K-2 200 m |
| Silver medal – second place | 1999 Zagreb | K-4 200 m |
| Silver medal – second place | 2000 Poznań | K-4 200 m |

Mykola Zaichenkov (Ukrainian: Микола Зайченков) is a Ukrainian sprint canoer who competed in the late 1990s and early 2000s. He won three medals at the ICF Canoe Sprint World Championships with a gold (K-4 200 m: 2003) and two bronzes (K-2 200 m and K-4 200 m: both 2001).
