= Marian Baban =

Romanian sprint canoer

Medal record

Men's sprint kayak

Representing Romania

World Championships
Silver medal – second place	2001 Poznań	K-4 500 m
Silver medal – second place	2003 Gainesville	K-4 200 m
Silver medal – second place	2003 Gainesville	K-4 500 m

European Championships
Silver medal – second place	2006 Račice	K-4 500 m
Bronze medal – third place	2005 Poznań	K-4 500 m

Marian Baban (born 8 January 1976) is a Romanian sprint kayaker who competed in the early to mid-2000s. He won three silver medals at the ICF Canoe Sprint World Championships, one in the K-4 200 m in 2003 (with Corneli Vasile Curuzan, Geza Magyar, and Romică Şerban) and two in the K-4 500 m in 2001 and 2003 (both with Corneli Vasile Curuzan, Alexandru Ceaușu, and Romică Șerban).

Competing in the men's K-4 500 m event, Baban won a silver medal at the 2006 Canoe Sprint European Championships in Račice (with Alexandru Ceaușu, Ștefan Vasile and Alin Anton) and a bronze medal at the 2005 Canoe Sprint European Championships in Poznań (with Ștefan Vasile, Alin Anton and Florean Mada).

Baban, who was born in Turnu Măgurele, Teleorman County, also competed in two Summer Olympics, earning his best finish of seventh in the K-4 1000 m event at Athens in 2004 (with Alexandru Ceauşu, Ștefan Vasile and Corneli Vasile Curuzan).

== European Championship medals ==
- Silver K4 500m 2006 Račice, Czech Republic 1:20.616
- Silver K4 1000m 2005 Poznan, Poland 2:51.015
- Bronze K4 500m 2005 Poznan, Poland 1:22.353
- Bronze K4 200m 2001 Milan, Italy 0:31.301
