= Daniel Jędraszko =

Polish canoeist

Medal record

Men's canoe sprint
Event	1st	2nd	3rd
Olympic Games	0	1	0
World Championships	4	4	2
European Championships	4	2	3
European Games	0	0	0
Total	8	6	5

Olympic Games
Silver medal – second place	2000 Sydney	C-2 500 m

World Championships
Gold medal – first place	1999 Milan	C-2 500 m
Gold medal – first place	2001 Poznań	C-2 200 m
Gold medal – first place	2003 Gainesville	C-2 200 m
Gold medal – first place	2003 Gainesville	C-2 500 m
Silver medal – second place	1997 Dartmouth	C-2 500 m
Silver medal – second place	1998 Szeged	C-2 500 m
Silver medal – second place	1999 Milan	C-2 200 m
Silver medal – second place	2001 Poznań	C-2 500 m
Bronze medal – third place	1997 Dartmouth	C-4 1000 m
Bronze medal – third place	2002 Seville	C-4 500 m

European Championships
Gold medal – first place	1997 Plovdiv	C2-500 m
Gold medal – first place	1999 Zagreb	C2-200 m
Gold medal – first place	2000 Poznań	C2-200 m
Gold medal – first place	2000 Poznań	C2-500 m
Silver medal – second place	2001 Milan	C2-200 m
Silver medal – second place	2004 Poznań	C2-500 m
Bronze medal – third place	1997 Plovdiv	C4-1000 m
Bronze medal – third place	2001 Milan	C4-200 m
Bronze medal – third place	2004 Poznań	C2-200m

Daniel Jędraszko (born April 6, 1976, in Szczecin) is a Polish sprint canoeist who has competed since the late 1990s. He has been world champion four times in the canoe double (C2) event with partner Paweł Baraszkiewicz.

They also won a C-2 500 m silver medal at the 2000 Summer Olympics in Sydney. The same year Jędraszko won his only European title to date (again in the C-2 500 m). However at the 2004 Athens games they underperformed and came away without a medal.

Injuries prevented him from competing in 2005 but in 2006 he formed a new C-2 partnership with Roman Rynkiewicz. They finished fifth at the world championships in Szeged, Hungary. At the 2008 Summer Olympics in Beijing, they finished ninth in the C-2 500 m event. Jędraszko has a total of ten medals at the ICF Canoe Sprint World Championships.

Jędraszko is a member of the Posnania Poznań club. He is 192 cm (6 ft 4 in) tall and weighs 93 kg (205 lb).

For hts sport achievements, he received:
Golden Cross of Merit in 2000;
Knight's Cross of the Order of Polonia Restituta (5th Class) in 2007.
