= Sergiy Klimniuk =

Ukrainian canoeist

Medal record

Men's canoe sprint

World Championships
Bronze medal – third place	2003 Gainesville	C-2 200 m

European Championships
Bronze medal – third place	2000 Poznań	C-4 200 m
Bronze medal – third place	2006 Račice	C-2 200 m

Sergiy Klimniuk (sometimes shown as Serhiy Klyminuk, Ukrainian: Сергій Васильович Климнюк; born January 14, 1976) is a Ukrainian sprint canoer who competed in the early 2000s. He won a bronze medal in the C-2 200 m event at the 2003 ICF Canoe Sprint World Championships in Gainesville.

Klimniuk also finished eighth in the C-2 500 m event at the 2000 Summer Olympics in Sydney.
