= Oleksiy Slivinskiy =

Ukrainian canoeist

Medal record

Men's canoe sprint

World Championships
Gold medal – first place	2003 Gainesville	K-4 200 m
Silver medal – second place	1998 Szeged	K-1 200 m
Silver medal – second place	1999 Milan	K-1 200 m
Silver medal – second place	2001 Poznań	K-1 200 m
Bronze medal – third place	1997 Dartmouth	K-1 200 m
Bronze medal – third place	2001 Poznań	K-4 200 m

European Championships
Silver medal – second place	1999 Zagreb	K-4 200 m
Silver medal – second place	2000 Poznań	K-1 200 m
Silver medal – second place	2000 Poznań	K-4 200 m

Oleksiy Slivinsky (born 8 August 1972 in Dobrotvir) is a Ukrainian sprint canoeist who competed from the late 1990s to the mid-2000s (decade). He won six medals at the ICF Canoe Sprint World Championships with a gold (K-4 200 m: 2003), three silvers (K-1 200 m: 1998, 1999, 2001), and two bronzes (K-1 200 m: 1997, K-4 200 m: 2001).

Slivinskiy also competed in the K-4 1000 m event at the 1996 Summer Olympics in Atlanta, but was eliminated in the semifinals.
