= Canoeing at the 2004 Summer Olympics – Men's K-4 1000 metres =

These are the results of the men's K-4 1000 metres competition in canoeing at the 2004 Summer Olympics. The K-4 event is raced by four-man canoe sprint kayaks.

== Medalists ==
Gold	Silver	Bronze
Hungary; Zoltán Kammerer; Botond Storcz; Ákos Vereckei; Gábor Horváth	Germany; Andreas Ihle; Mark Zabel; Björn Bach; Stefan Ulm	Slovakia; Richard Riszdorfer; Michal Riszdorfer; Erik Vlček; Juraj Bača

== Heats ==
The 10 teams first raced in two heats. The top three finishers in each heat advanced directly to the final, and the remaining four teams advanced to the semifinal. No teams were eliminated in the heats. The heats were raced on August 23.

Heat 1
1.	Slovakia	Richard Riszdorfer, Michal Riszdorfer, Erik Vlček, Juraj Bača	2:53.256	QF
2.	Bulgaria	Milko Kazanov, Ivan Hristov, Petar Merkov, Yordan Yordanov	2:54.252	QF
3.	Poland	Tomasz Mendelski, Rafał Głażewski, Adam Seroczyński, Dariusz Białkowski	2:55.240	QF
4.	Romania	Marian Baban, Alexandru Bogdan Ceausu, Vasile Curuzan Corneli, Stefan Vasile	2:55.324	QS
5.	Canada	Steven Jorens, Richard Dober, Ryan Cuthbert, Andrew Willows	2:56.336	QS
Heat 2
1.	Hungary	Zoltán Kammerer, Botond Storcz, Ákos Vereckei, Gábor Horváth	2:51.010	QF
2.	Belarus	Raman Piatrushenka, Aliaksei Abalmasau, Dziamyan Turchyn, Vadzim Makhneu	2:52.170	QF
3.	Germany	Andreas Ihle, Mark Zabel, Björn Bach, Stefan Ulm	2:52.678	QF
4.	Norway	Jacob Norenberg, Alexander Wefald, Andreas Gjersøe, Mattis Næss	2:54.894	QS
5.	Uzbekistan	Aleksey Babadjanov, Dmitriy Strijkov, Sergey Borzov, Anton Ryahov	3:01.446	QS

== Semifinal ==
The top three finishers in the semifinal race qualified for the final, joining the six teams that had advanced directly from the heats. The last place team was eliminated. The semifinal was raced on August 25.

1.	Romania	2:53.994	QF
2.	Norway	2:54.350	QF
3.	Canada	2:55.926	QF
4.	Uzbekistan	2:56.594

== Final ==
The final was raced on August 27.

Gold	Hungary	2:56.919
Silver	Germany	2:58.659
Bronze	Slovakia	2:59.314
4.	Bulgaria	2:59.622
5.	Norway	3:01.698
6.	Belarus	3:02.419
7.	Romania	3:03.107
8.	Poland	3:03.562
9.	Canada	3:07.714
