= Mykhaylo Luchnik =

Ukrainian canoeist

Medal record

Men's canoe sprint

World Championships
Gold medal – first place	2003 Gainesville	K-4 200 m
Bronze medal – third place	2001 Poznań	K-2 200 m
Bronze medal – third place	2001 Poznań	K-4 200 m

European Championships
Gold medal – first place	2000 Poznań	K-2 200 m
Silver medal – second place	1999 Zagreb	K-4 200 m
Silver medal – second place	2000 Poznań	K-4 200 m

Mykhaylo Luchnik is a Ukrainian sprint canoer who competed in the late 1990s and early 2000s. He won three medals at the ICF Canoe Sprint World Championships with a gold (K-4 200 m: 2003) and two bronzes (K-2 200 m and K-4 200 m: both 2001).
