= Beata Sokołowska-Kulesza =

Polish canoeist (born 1974)

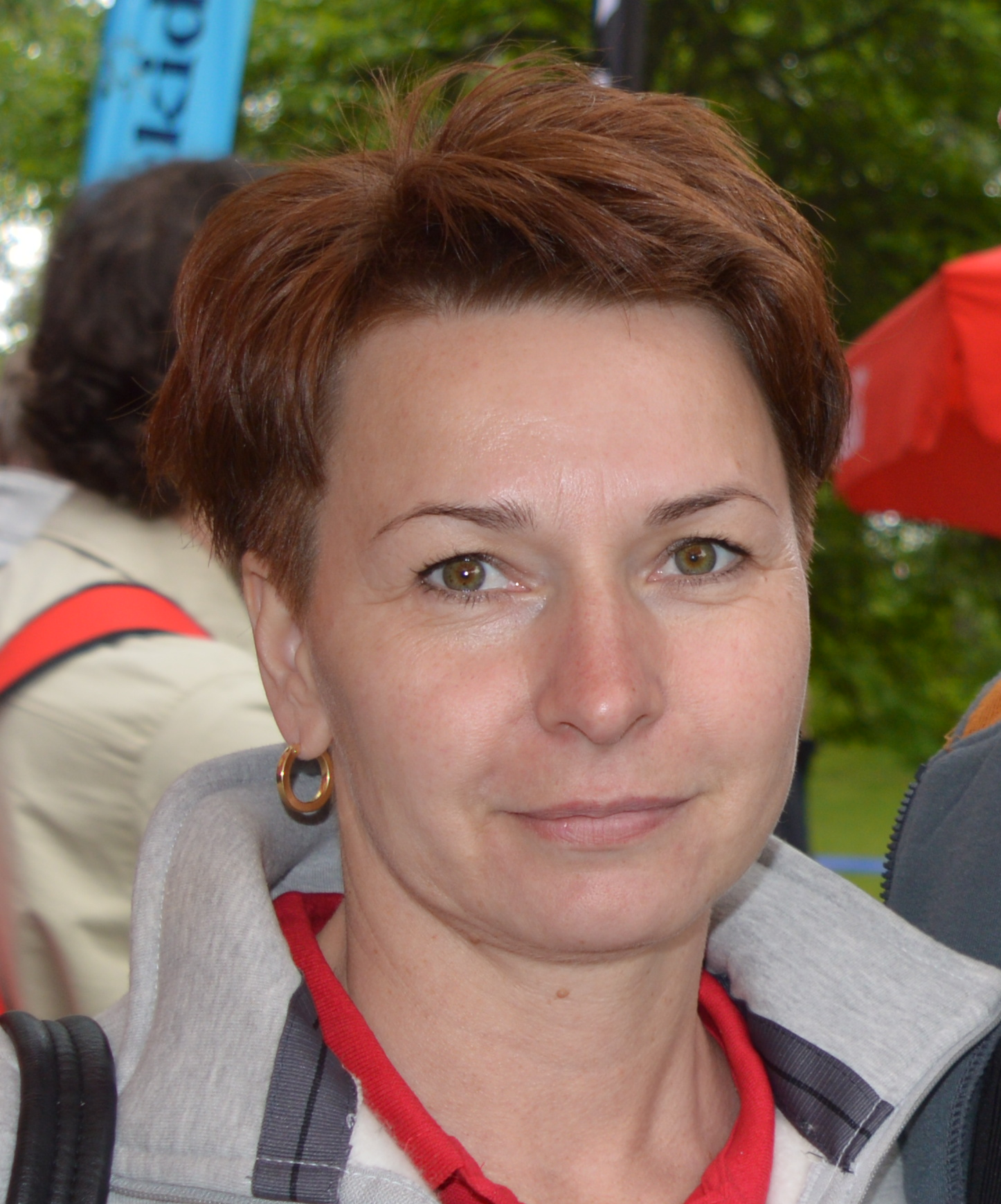

Medal record

Women's canoe sprint
Event	1st	2nd	3rd
Olympic Games	0	0	2
World Championships	1	4	5
European Championships	5	1	2
European Games	0	0	0
Total	6	5	8

Olympic Games
Bronze medal – third place	2000 Sydney	K-2 500 m
Bronze medal – third place	2004 Athens	K-2 500 m

World Championships
Gold medal – first place	1999 Milan	K-2 500 m
Silver medal – second place	1999 Milan	K-2 200 m
Silver medal – second place	2001 Poznań	K-2 200 m
Silver medal – second place	2001 Poznań	K-2 500 m
Silver medal – second place	2005 Zagreb	K-4 200 m
Bronze medal – third place	1999 Milan	K-4 200 m
Bronze medal – third place	1999 Milan	K-4 500 m
Bronze medal – third place	2003 Gainesville	K-2 200 m
Bronze medal – third place	2003 Gainesville	K-2 500 m
Bronze medal – third place	2003 Gainesville	K-4 500 m

European Championships
Gold medal – first place	1999 Zagreb	K2-200 m
Gold medal – first place	1999 Zagreb	K2-250 m
Gold medal – first place	1999 Zagreb	K2-1000 m
Gold medal – first place	2000 Poznań	K2-200 m
Gold medal – first place	2000 Poznań	K2-500 m
Silver medal – second place	2001 Milan	K2-1000 m
Bronze medal – third place	2000 Poznań	K2-1000 m
Bronze medal – third place	2001 Milan	K2-200 m

Beata Sokołowska-Kulesza (born 10 January 1974 in Gorzów Wielkopolski) is a Polish sprint canoer who competed from 1999 to 2004. Competing in two Summer Olympics, she won two bronze medals in the K-2 500 m event (2000, 2004).

Sokołowska-Kulesza has also been successful at the ICF Canoe Sprint World Championships, winning ten medals. This includes a gold (K-2 500 m: 1999), four silvers (K-2 200 m: 1999, 2001; K-2 500 m: 2001, K-4 200 m: 2005), and five bronzes (K-2 200 m: 2003, K-2 500 m: 2003, K-4 200 m: 1999, K-4 500 m: 1999, 2003).

For her sport achievements, she received:
Golden Cross of Merit in 2000;
Knight's Cross of the Order of Polonia Restituta (5th Class) in 2004.
