= Michael Kolganov =

Israeli sprint kayaker

Personal information
- Native name: Михаил Калганов
- Nickname: Misha
- Born: 24 October 1974 (age 51) Tashkent, Uzbek SSR, Soviet Union
- Height: 185 cm (6 ft 1 in)

Sport
- Country: Israel
- Sport: Canoeing
- Event: Canoe sprint
Medal record
Men's canoe sprint
Representing Israel
Summer Olympics
Bronze medal – third place	2000 Sydney	K-1 500 m
World Championships
Gold medal – first place	1998 Szeged	K-1 200 m
Gold medal – first place	1999 Milan	K-1 200 m
Silver medal – second place	1998 Szeged	K-1 500 m
European Championships
Gold medal – first place	1999 Zagreb	K-1 200 m
Gold medal – first place	2000 Poznań	K-1 1000 m
Silver medal – second place	2000 Poznań	K-1 500 m
Silver medal – second place	2001 Milan	K-1 500 m
Bronze medal – third place	1999 Zagreb	K-1 500 m
Bronze medal – third place	1999 Zagreb	K-1 1000 m
Bronze medal – third place	2006 Račice	K-2 200 m

Michael "Misha" Kolganov (or Kalganov, Hebrew: מיכאל (מישה) קולגנוב, Russian: Михаил Калганов; born 24 October 1974) is a USSR-born Israeli sprint kayaker and former two-time world champion (1998 & 1999). Competing in three Summer Olympics, he won the bronze medal in the K-1 500 m event at Sydney in 2000. He was the flag bearer for Israel during the 2008 Summer Olympics opening ceremony.

== Early life ==
Mikhail Kolganov was born in Tashkent, Uzbek SSR, Soviet Union. He is Jewish. and took up canoeing at the age of 14. "I was a fat young boy," he recalled, "and my parents were looking for a hobby for me that would help me lose weight." He also dabbled in wrestling and rugby but found he enjoyed kayaking the most. Kolganov's older brother Andrei also represented the Soviet Union, and was a Soviet youth champion at kayak competition. Kolganov immigrated to Israel in 1996.

After moving to Israel, Kolganov lived in Haifa, where he trained at the Hapoel Haifa Rowing Club before moving to kibbutz Degania Bet and continuing his training with Hapoel Emek HaYarden in the Sea of Galilee. Within a year of moving to Israel he began representing the country in international sporting events. He served in the Israel Defense Forces in the framework of a program for sporting excellence, granting him accommodations to continue to pursue kayaking during his service.

== Career ==
Kolganov has represented Israel in competition since 1997. Kolganov was K-1 200 m world champion in 1998 and 1999, and earned a K-1 500 m silver in 1998.

He represented Israel at the 2000 Summer Olympics, winning the K-1 500 m bronze medal and finishing fourth in the K-1 1000 m event. He competed on behalf of Israel at the 2004 Summer Olympics, and finished eighth in the second semifinal of the K-1 500 m. He competed on behalf of Israel at the 2008 Summer Olympics in Beijing, China, and failed to advance to the final in both the K-1 500 m and K-1 1000 m events.

He also competed in the K-2. where at the 2006 European Championships in Račice, Czech Republic, he won the K2 200 m bronze medal with partner Barak Lufan. At the 2006 ICF Canoe Sprint World Championships in Szeged, Hungary, Kolganov and Lufan finished fifth in the K-2 200 m and sixth in the K-2 500 m.

== Later life ==
Kolganov, a resident of Tiberias, ran for the city council in the 2008 Israeli municipal elections on the Yisrael Beiteinu list. He ran again in the 2013 Israeli municipal elections and succeeded in winning a seat. In 2015 Kolganov emigrated to Germany, claiming that there was a lack of opportunities to for him find work in Israel and that he had been unemployed for months. He currently lives in Baden-Baden and runs a beauty salon.

== See also ==
- List of select Jewish canoeists
