= Aneta Konieczna =

Polish canoeist (born 1978)

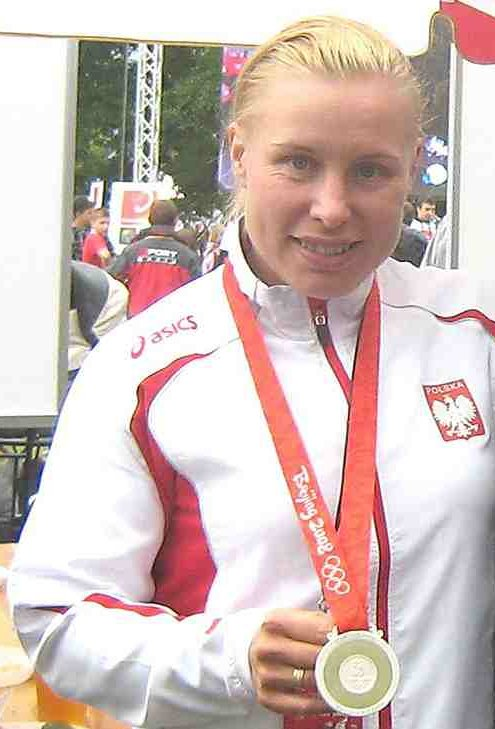

Medal record

Women's canoe sprint

Representing Poland
Event	1st	2nd	3rd
Olympic Games	0	1	2
World Championships	2	5	9
European Championships	6	4	6
European Games	0	0	0
Total	8	9	15

Olympic Games
Silver medal – second place	2008 Beijing	K-2 500 m
Bronze medal – third place	2000 Sydney	K-2 500 m
Bronze medal – third place	2004 Athens	K-2 500 m

World Championships
Gold medal – first place	1999 Milan	K-2 500 m
Gold medal – first place	2002 Seville	K-4 1000 m
Silver medal – second place	1999 Milan	K-2 200 m
Silver medal – second place	2001 Poznań	K-2 200 m
Silver medal – second place	2001 Poznań	K-2 500 m
Silver medal – second place	2002 Seville	K-2 200 m
Silver medal – second place	2005 Zagreb	K-4 500 m
Bronze medal – third place	1999 Milan	K-4 200 m
Bronze medal – third place	1999 Milan	K-4 500 m
Bronze medal – third place	2001 Poznań	K-4 200 m
Bronze medal – third place	2003 Gainesville	K-1 500 m
Bronze medal – third place	2003 Gainesville	K-2 200 m
Bronze medal – third place	2003 Gainesville	K-4 200 m
Bronze medal – third place	2007 Duisburg	K-4 500 m
Bronze medal – third place	2010 Poznań	K-4 500 m
Bronze medal – third place	2011 Szeged	K-1 4 x 200 m

European Championships
Gold medal – first place	1999 Zagreb	K2-200 m
Gold medal – first place	1999 Zagreb	K2-250 m
Gold medal – first place	1999 Zagreb	K2-1000 m
Gold medal – first place	2000 Poznań	K2-200 m
Gold medal – first place	2000 Poznań	K2-500 m
Gold medal – first place	2002 Szeged	K2-500 m
Silver medal – second place	2002 Szeged	K1-1000 m
Silver medal – second place	2002 Szeged	K2-200 m
Silver medal – second place	2004 Poznań	K2-200 m
Silver medal – second place	2011 Belgrade	K-2 500 m
Bronze medal – third place	2000 Poznań	K2-1000 m
Bronze medal – third place	2001 Milan	K2-200 m
Bronze medal – third place	2002 Szeged	K4-200 m
Bronze medal – third place	2002 Szeged	K4-500 m
Bronze medal – third place	2007 Pontevedra	K4-500 m
Bronze medal – third place	2010 Trasona	K4-500 m

Aneta Regina Konieczna (née Pastuszka, born 11 May 1978, in Krosno Odrzańskie) is a Polish sprint canoer who has competed since the mid-1990s. Competing in five Summer Olympics, she won three medals in the K-2 500 m event with one silver (2008) and two bronzes (2000, 2004).

Konieczna has also been successful at the ICF Canoe Sprint World Championships, winning sixteen medals. This includes two golds (K-2 500 m: 1999, K-4 1000 m: 2002), five silvers (K-2 200 m: 1999, 2001, 2002; K-2 500 m: 2001, K-4 500 m: 2005, and seven bronzes (K-1 500 m: 2003, K-2 200 m: 2003, K-4 200 m: 1999, 2001, 2003; K-4 500 m: 1999, 2007, 2010).

For her sport achievements, she received:
Golden Cross of Merit in 2000;
Knight's Cross of the Order of Polonia Restituta (5th Class) in 2004;
Officer's Cross of the Order of Polonia Restituta (4th Class) in 2008.
