= Dmitry Sabin =

Ukrainian canoeist (born 1979)

Medal record

Men's canoe sprint

World Championships
Gold medal – first place	2001 Poznań	C-1 200 m
Bronze medal – third place	2003 Gainesville	C-2 200 m
Disqualified	2002 Seville	C-1 200 m

European Championships
Gold medal – first place	2000 Poznań	C-1 200 m
Gold medal – first place	2001 Milan	C-1 200 m
Bronze medal – third place	2000 Poznań	C-4 200 m
Bronze medal – third place	2006 Račice	C-2 200 m

Dmitriy Sabin (sometimes listed as Dmytro Sablin; Ukrainian: Дмитро Васильович Сабін; born February 7, 1979) is a Ukrainian sprint canoer who competed in the early 2000s. He won two medals at the ICF Canoe Sprint World Championships with a gold (C-1 200 m: 2001) and a bronze (C-2 200 m: 2003). Sabin also won a silver in the C-1 200 m event at the 2002 ICF Canoe Sprint World Championships in Seville, but was disqualified for doping though he was allowed to compete at the following year's world championships.

Sabin also finished eighth in the C-2 500 m event at the 2000 Summer Olympics in Sydney.
