= Tim Huth =

German canoeist

Medal record

Men's canoe sprint

World Championships
Bronze medal – third place	2003 Gainesville	K-2 1000 m

Tim Huth is a German sprint canoer who competed in the mid-2000s. He won a bronze medal in the K-2 1000 m event at the 2003 ICF Canoe Sprint World Championships in Gainesville.
