= Alvydas Duonėla =

Lithuanian canoeist (born 1976)

Medal record

Men's canoe sprint

World Championships
Gold medal – first place	2001 Poznań	K-2 200 m
Gold medal – first place	2002 Seville	K-2 200 m
Gold medal – first place	2003 Gainesville	K-2 200 m
Silver medal – second place	2001 Poznań	K-2 500 m
Silver medal – second place	2005 Zagreb	K-2 200 m
Bronze medal – third place	2003 Gainesville	K-2 500 m
Bronze medal – third place	2005 Zagreb	K-2 500 m

European Championships
Gold medal – first place	2000 Poznań	K-1 200 m
Gold medal – first place	2004 Poznań	K-2 200 m
Silver medal – second place	2004 Poznań	K-1 200 m
Silver medal – second place	2004 Poznań	K-2 500 m
Silver medal – second place	2006 Račice	K-2 200 m
Silver medal – second place	2008 Milan	K-2 200 m
Bronze medal – third place	2008 Milan	K-2 500 m

Alvydas Duonėla (born 27 June 1976 in Skuodas) is a Lithuanian sprint canoer. He won seven medals at the ICF Canoe Sprint World Championships with three golds (K-2 200 m: 2001, 2002, 2003), two silvers (K-2 200 m: 2005, K-2 500 m: 2001), and two bronzes (K-2 500 m: 2003, 2005).

Duonėla also competed in three Summer Olympics, earning his best finish of seventh twice (K-1 500 m: 2000, K-2 500 m: 2004).

Duonėla is 190 cm / 6'3 tall and weighs 89 kg / 196 lbs. He is a member of the Žalgiris Canoe Club in Vilnius. He lists his interests as music and rallying.
