= Sándor Malomsoki =

Hungarian canoeist

Medal record

Men's canoe sprint

World Championships
Gold medal – first place	2003 Gainesville	C-4 200 m

Sándor Malomsoki is a Hungarian sprint canoeist who competed in the early 2000s. He won a gold medal in the C-4 200 m event at the 2003 ICF Canoe Sprint World Championships in Gainesville.
