= 2003 ICF Canoe Sprint World Championships =

Canoe and kayak event in Georgia, US

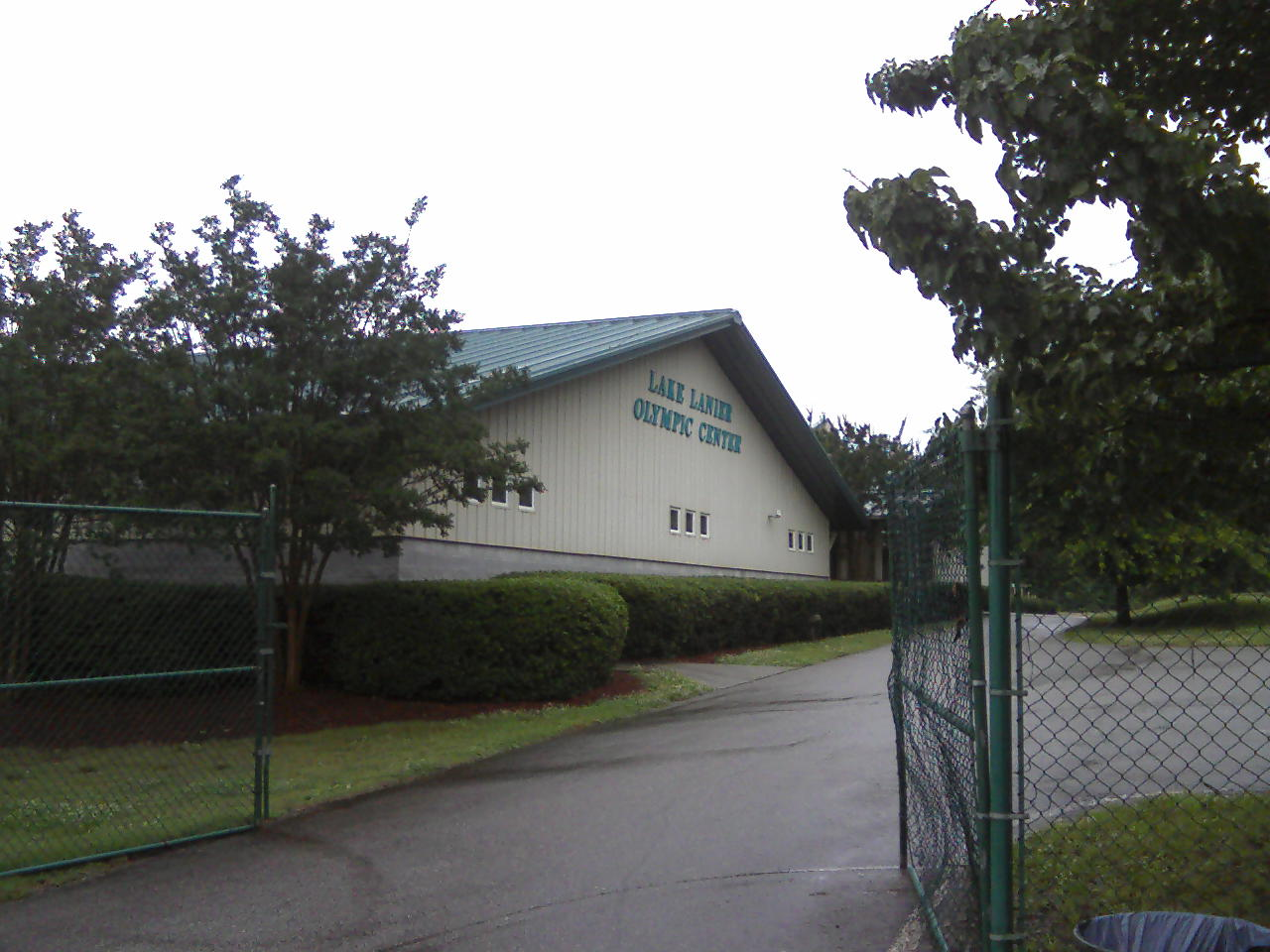
- The Lake Lanier Olympic Center hosted these championships. Photo circa 2010.
- Host city: (United States) Gainesville, Georgia, USA
- Dates: September 10-14

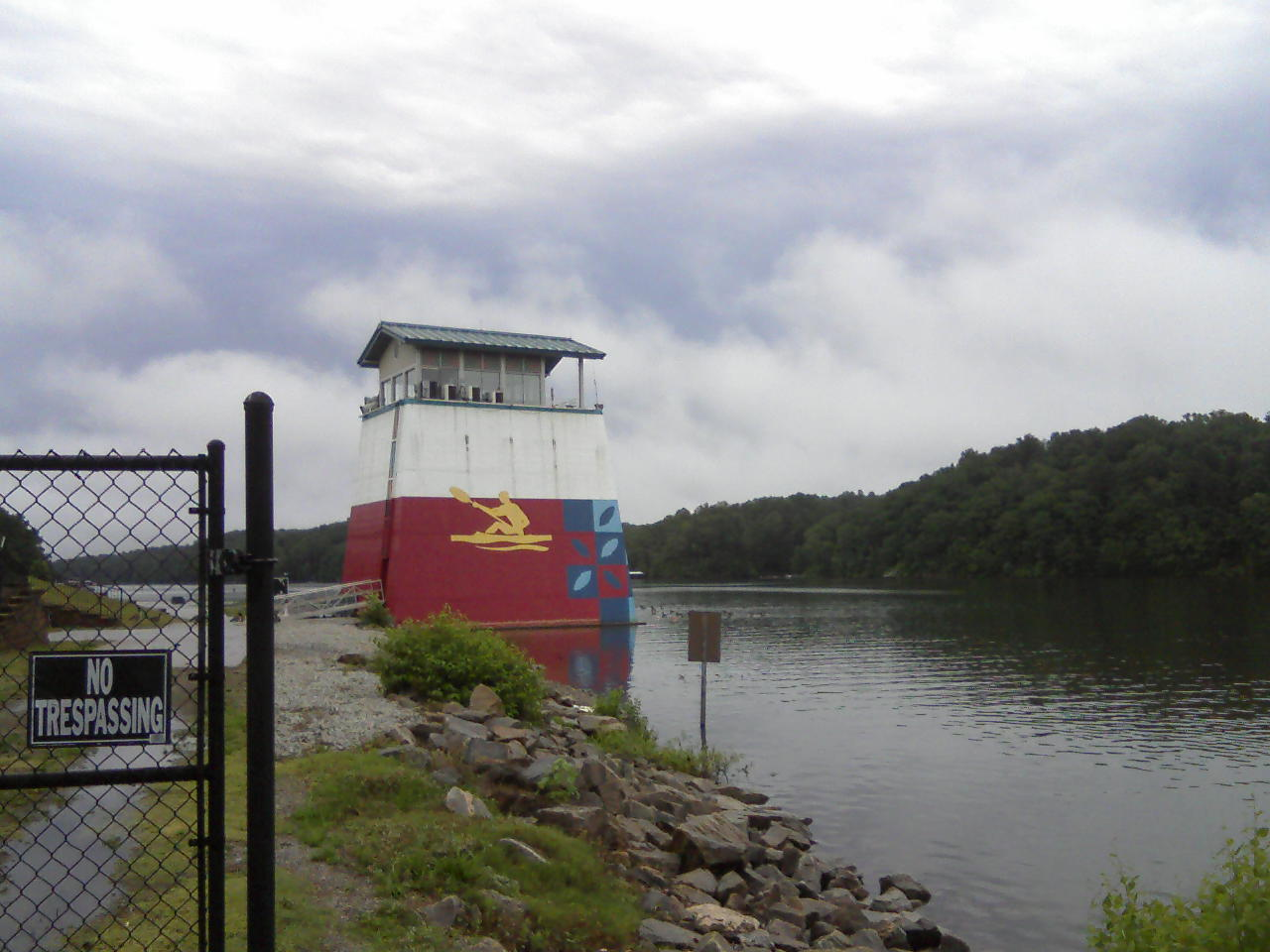
Finish tower at Lake Lanier where the 2003 championships took place. Photo circa 2010. This was also the same finish used for the canoe sprint and rowing competitions at the 1996 Summer Olympics

The 2003 ICF Canoe Sprint World Championships were held September 10–14, 2003 in Gainesville, Georgia, United States at Lake Lanier. Located north of Atlanta, this was also where the canoe sprint and rowing events for the 1996 Summer Olympics took place.

The men's competition consisted of nine Canadian (single paddle, open boat) and nine kayak events. Women competed in nine events, all in kayak.

This was the 33rd championships in canoe sprint.

== Doping controversy ==
Sergey Ulegin of Russia won two golds (C-4 200 m, C-4 500 m) and one silver (C-2 500 m), but was stripped of those medals when he tested positive for doping. His teammates in the C-2 500 m (Aleksandr Kostoglod), C-4 200 m (Kostoglod, Roman Kruglyakov, and Maksim Opalev), and C-4 500 m (Kostoglod, Kruglyakov, and Opalev) events also lost their medals as a result of Ulegin's positive test. Ulegin received a two-year suspension.

== Medal summary ==
=== Men's ===
Non-Olympic classes

==== Canoe ====
Event	Gold		Silver		Bronze	
C-1 200 m	Maksim Opalev (RUS)	40.896	Martin Doktor (CZE)	40.929	Andreas Dittmer (GER)	40.962
C-1 500 m	Andreas Dittmer (GER)	1:47.277	Maksim Opalev (RUS)	1:47.488	Martin Doktor (CZE)	1:48.030
C-1 1000 m	Andreas Dittmer (GER)	3:52.482	David Cal (ESP)	3:53.406	Maksim Opalev (RUS)	3:55.299
C-2 200 m	Poland; Paweł Baraszkiewicz; Daniel Jędraszko	37.972	Czech Republic; Petr Fuksa; Petr Netušil	38.012	Ukraine; Sergey Klimniuk; Dmitriy Sabin	38.230
C-2 500 m	Poland; Paweł Baraszkiewicz; Daniel Jędraszko	1:39.194	Romania; Silviu Simioncencu; Florin Popescu	1:40.824	Cuba; Ibrahim Rojas; Ledis Balceiro	1:41.136
C-2 1000 m	Romania; Silviu Simioncencu; Florin Popescu	3:34.932	Russia; Aleksandr Kovalyov; Aleksandr Kostoglod	3:35.325	Hungary; György Kozmann; György Kolonics	3:35.428
C-4 200 m	Hungary; Sándor Malomsoki; László Vasali; György Kozmann; György Kolonics	34.737	Czech Republic; Petr Fuksa; Petr Netušil; Jan Břečka; Karel Kožíšek	35.105	Romania; Silviu Simioncencu; Mitică Pricop; Florin Popescu; Petre Condrat	35.610
C-4 500 m	Romania; Silviu Simioncencu; Florin Popescu; Mitică Pricop; Petre Condrat	1:32.022	Poland; Adam Ginter; Łukasz Woszczyński; Marcin Grzybowski; Michał Śliwiński	1:32.185	Hungary; Csaba Hüttner; Márton Joób; Imre Pulai; Ferenc Novák	1:33.506
C-4 1000 m	Hungary; Csaba Hüttner; Gábor Furdok; Imre Pulai; Ferenc Novák	3:22.090	Canada; Attila Buday; Tamas Buday Jr. Maxim Boilard; Dimitri Joukovski	3:22.332	Poland; Andrzej Jezierski; Roman Rynkiewicz; Adam Ginter; Wojciech Tyszyński	3:22.446

==== Kayak ====
Event	Gold		Silver		Bronze	
K-1 200 m	Ronald Rauhe (GER)	35.798	Vince Fehérvári (AUS)	36.411	Anton Ryakhov (UZB)	36.417
K-1 500 m	Nathan Baggaley (AUS)	1:37.541	Carlos Pérez (ESP)	1:37.961	Lutz Altepost (GER)	1:38.077
K-1 1000 m	Ben Fouhy (NZL)	3:28.852	Adam van Koeverden (CAN)	3:29.720	Nathan Baggaley (AUS)	3:29.909
K-2 200 m	Lithuania; Alvydas Duonėla; Egidijus Balčiūnas	32.972	Poland; Marek Twardowski; Adam Wysocki	33.154	Germany; Ronald Rauhe; Tim Wieskötter	33.385
K-2 500 m	Germany; Ronald Rauhe; Tim Wieskötter	1:27.974	Belarus; Roman Piatrushenko; Vadzim Makhneu	1:28.954	Lithuania; Alvydas Duonėla; Egidijus Balčiūnas	1:29.205
K-2 1000 m	Sweden; Markus Oscarsson; Henrik Nilsson	3:14.157	Belgium; Bob Maesen; Wouter D'Haene	3:14.690	Germany; Tim Huth; Marco Herszel	3:15.142
K-4 200 m	Ukraine; Oleksiy Slivinskiy; Mykhaylo Luchnik; Mykola Zaichenkov; Andriy Borzukov	31.136	Romania; Vasile Curuzan; Marian Baban; Alexandru Ceaușu; Romică Șerban	31.168	Spain; Manuel Muñoz; Jaime Acuña; Aike González; Oier Aizpurua	31.260
K-4 500 m	Slovakia; Richard Riszdorfer; Michal Riszdorfer; Erik Vlček; Juraj Bača	1:20.409	Romania; Vasile Curuzan; Marian Baban; Alexandru Ceaușu; Romică Șerban	1:21.353	Russia; Aleksandr Ivanik; Anatoly Tishchenko; Oleg Gorobiy; Vladimir Gurhsikin	1:21.408
K-4 1000 m	Slovakia; Richard Riszdorfer; Michal Riszdorfer; Erik Vlček; Juraj Bača	2:55.291	Hungary; Zoltán Kammerer; Ákos Vereckei; Roland Kökény; Krisztián Veréb	2:56.795	Germany; Andreas Ihle; Mark Zabel; Björn Bach; Stefan Ulm	2:57.048

=== Women's ===
Non-Olympic classes

==== Kayak ====
Event	Gold		Silver		Bronze	
K-1 200 m	Caroline Brunet (CAN)	41.344	Maria Teresa Portelo (ESP)	41.600	Tímea Paksy (HUN)	42.298
K-1 500 m	Katalin Kovács (HUN)	1:48.996	Caroline Brunet (CAN)	1:49.778	Aneta Pastuszka (POL)	1:49.785
K-1 1000 m	Katalin Kovács (HUN)	4:00.955	Katrin Wagner (GER)	4:02.122	Lior Karmi (ISR)	4:03.104
K-2 200 m	Hungary; Tímea Paksy; Melinda Patyi	38.292	Spain; Maria Teresa Portela; Beatriz Manchón	38.521	Poland; Aneta Pastuszka; Beata Sokołowska-Kulesza	38.528
K-2 500 m	Hungary; Szilvia Szabó; Kinga Bóta	1:39.984	Bulgaria; Bonka Pindzeva; Delyana Dacheva	1:40.937	Poland; Beata Sokołowska-Kulesza; Joanna Skowroń	1:41.577
K-2 1000 m	Hungary; Tímea Paksy; Dalma Benedek	3:41.540	Germany; Nadine Opgen-Rhein; Manuela Mucke	3:41.636	Canada; Caroline Brunet; Mylanie Barre	3:42.752
K-4 200 m	Hungary; Natasa Janics; Szilvia Szabó; Erzsébet Viski; Kinga Bóta	35.665	Spain; Maria Garcia Suarez; Beatriz Manchón; Jana Smidakova; Maria Teresa Portela	35.939	Poland; Karolina Sadalska; Aneta Pastuszka; Beata Sokołowska-Kulesza; Joanna Skowroń	36.118
K-4 500 m	Hungary; Katalin Kovács; Szilvia Szabó; Erzsébet Viski; Kinga Bóta	1:31.632	Poland; Karolina Sadalska; Małgorzata Czajczyńska; Aneta Białkowska; Joanna Skowroń	1:33.573	Spain; Maria Garcia; Beatriz Manchón; Jana Smidakova; Maria Teresa Portela	1:33.742
K-4 1000 m	Hungary; Eszter Rasztótsky; Kinga Dékány; Krisztina Fazekas; Natasa Janics	3:13.296	Ukraine; Olena Cherevatova; Tatyana Semikina; Mariya Ralcheva; Inna Osipenko	3:16.389	Australia; Paul Harvey; Chantal Meek; Amanda Rankin; Katrin Kieseler	3:16.870

== Medal table ==
Rank	Nation	Gold	Silver	Bronze	Total
1	Hungary	10	1	3	14
2	Germany	4	2	5	11
3	Poland	2	3	5	10
4	Romania	2	3	1	6
5	Slovakia	2	0	0	2
6	Canada	1	3	1	5
7	Russia	1	2	2	5
8	Australia	1	1	2	4
9	Ukraine	1	1	1	3
10	Lithuania	1	0	1	2
11	New Zealand	1	0	0	1
11	Sweden	1	0	0	1
13	Spain	0	5	2	7
14	Czech Republic	0	3	1	4
15	Belarus	0	1	0	1
15	Belgium	0	1	0	1
15	Bulgaria	0	1	0	1
18	Cuba	0	0	1	1
18	Israel	0	0	1	1
18	Uzbekistan	0	0	1	1
Totals (20 entries)		27	27	27	81
