= Katrin Kieseler =

German-born, Australian sprint canoer

Medal record

Women's canoe sprint

World Championships
Gold medal – first place	1997 Dartmouth	K-4 500 m
Silver medal – second place	2001 Poznań	K-2 1000 m
Bronze medal – third place	2003 Gainesville	K-4 1000 m

Katrin Kieseler is a German-born, Australian canoe sprinter who competed from the late 1990s to the mid-2000s. She won a complete set of medals at the ICF Canoe Sprint World Championships with a gold (K-4 500 m: 1997 for Germany), a silver (K-2 1000 m: 2001 for Australia), and a bronze (K-4 1000 m: 2003 for Australia).
