= Jaime Acuña =

Spanish canoeist

Personal information
- Full name: Jaime Acuña Iglesias
- Nationality: Spanish
- Born: 5 March 1978 (age 48) Pontevedra, Spain
Medal record
Men's canoe sprint
Representing Spain
World Championships
Silver medal – second place	2002 Seville	K-4 200 m
Bronze medal – third place	2002 Seville	K-4 500 m
Bronze medal – third place	2003 Gainesville	K-4 200 m

Jaime Acuña Iglesias (Note: In this Spanish name, the first or paternal surname is Acuña and the second or maternal family name is Iglesias.) (born 5 March 1978 in Pontevedra) is a Spanish sprint canoer who competed in the early 2000s. He won three medals at the ICF Canoe Sprint World Championships with a silver (K-4 200 m: 2002) and two bronzes (K-4 200 m: 2003, K-4 500 m: 2002).
