= Andrej Wiebauer =

Slovak sprint canoer

Sport
- Country: Slovakia
- Sport: Canoe sprint
Medal record
Men's canoe sprint
World Championships
Silver medal – second place	2005 Zagreb	K-4 500 m
European Championships
Bronze medal – third place	1999 Zagreb	K-4 200 m
Bronze medal – third place	1999 Zagreb	K-4 1000 m
Gold medal – first place	2000 Poznań	K-4 200 m
Silver medal – second place	2005 Poznań	K-4 500 m

Andrej Wiebauer is a Slovak sprint canoer who competed in the mid-2000s. He won a silver medal in the K-4 500 m at the 2005 ICF Canoe Sprint World Championships in Zagreb.
