= Eszter Rasztótsky =

Hungarian sprint canoer

Medal record

Women's canoe sprint

World Championships
Gold medal – first place	2003 Gainesville	K-4 1000 m

Eszter Rasztótsky is a Hungarian sprint canoer who has competed in the early 2000s. She won a gold medal in the K-4 1000 m event at the 2003 ICF Canoe Sprint World Championships in Gainesville.
