= Csaba Hüttner =

Hungarian canoeist (born 1971)

Medal record

Men's canoe sprint

World Championships
Gold medal – first place	1997 Dartmouth	C-4 500 m
Gold medal – first place	1998 Szeged	C-4 500 m
Gold medal – first place	1998 Szeged	C-4 1000 m
Gold medal – first place	2003 Gainesville	C-4 1000 m
Silver medal – second place	1995 Duisburg	C-4 1000 m
Bronze medal – third place	2003 Gainesville	C-4 500 m

Csaba Hüttner (born January 20, 1971, in Budapest) is a Hungarian sprint canoer and marathon canoeist who competed from the mid-1990s to the mid-2000s. He won six medals at the ICF Canoe Sprint World Championships with four golds (C-4 500 m: 1997, 1998; C-4 1000 m: 1998, 2003), one silver (C-4 1000 m: 1995) and one bronze (C-4 500 m: 2003).
