= Miklós Buzál =

Hungarian canoeist

Medal record

Men's canoe sprint

World Championships
| Silver medal – second place | 1998 Szeged | C-2 200 m |

Miklós Buzál is a Hungarian sprint canoer who competed in the late 1990s. He won a silver medal in the C-2 200 m event at the 1998 ICF Canoe Sprint World Championships in Szeged.
