= Mark Zabel =

Olympic canoeist

Medal record

Men's canoe sprint

Olympic Games
Gold medal – first place	1996 Atlanta	K-4 1000 m
Silver medal – second place	2000 Sydney	K-4 1000 m
Silver medal – second place	2004 Athens	K-4 1000 m

World Championships
Gold medal – first place	1995 Duisburg	K-4 1000 m
Gold medal – first place	1997 Dartmouth	K-4 1000 m
Gold medal – first place	1998 Szeged	K-4 500 m
Gold medal – first place	1998 Szeged	K-4 1000 m
Gold medal – first place	1999 Milan	K-4 500 m
Gold medal – first place	2001 Poznań	K-4 1000 m
Silver medal – second place	1995 Duisburg	K-4 500 m
Silver medal – second place	1997 Dartmouth	K-4 500 m
Silver medal – second place	1999 Milan	K-4 1000 m
Silver medal – second place	2002 Seville	K-4 1000 m
Bronze medal – third place	1995 Duisburg	K-4 200 m
Bronze medal – third place	1997 Dartmouth	K-4 200 m
Bronze medal – third place	2003 Gainesville	K-4 1000 m

Mark Zabel (born 12 August 1973 in Calbe, Saxony-Anhalt) is a German sprint canoeist and Surfski Champion. Competing in three Summer Olympics, he won three medals in the K-4 1000 m event with one gold (1996) and two silvers (2000, 2004).

Zabel also won thirteen medals at the ICF Canoe Sprint World Championships with six golds (K-4 500 m: 1998, 1999; K-4 1000 m: 1995, 1997, 1998, 2001), four silvers (K-4 500 m: 1995, 1997; K-4 1000 m: 1999, 2002), and three bronzes (K-4 200 m: 1995, 1997; K-4 1000 m: 2003).

Zabel retired in July 2005 and has now become a coach. He is 190 cm tall and raced at 86 kg (189 lbs).
