= Martin Chorváth =

Slovak canoeist

Medal record

Men's canoe sprint

World Championships
Gold medal – first place	2002 Seville	K-4 200 m

Martin Chorváth (born 9 October 1980) is a Slovak sprint canoeist who competed in the early to mid-2000s. He won a gold medal in the K-4 200 m event at the 2002 ICF Canoe Sprint World Championships in Seville.

Chorváth also competed in the K-1 500 m event at the 2004 Summer Olympics in Athens, but was eliminated in the semifinals.
