= Gábor Ivan =

Hungarian canoeist

Medal record

Men's canoe sprint

World Championships
| Gold medal – first place | 2001 Poznań | C-4 200 m |
| Gold medal – first place | 2001 Poznań | C-4 1000 m |
| Silver medal – second place | 2001 Poznań | C-4 500 m |

Gábor Ivan is a Hungarian sprint canoeist who competed in the early 2000s. He won three medals at the 2001 ICF Canoe Sprint World Championships in Poznań with two gold (C-4 200 m, C-4 1000 m) and a silver (C-4 1000 m). He also participated in 2002 ICF Canoe Sprint European Champion in Szeged and won two gold (C-4 1000m and 500m) and a silver medal (C-4 500m).
