= Rastislav Kužel =

Slovak canoeist

Medal record

Men's canoe sprint

World Championships
Gold medal – first place	2002 Seville	K-4 200 m

Rastislav Kužel (born 4 April 1975) is a Slovak sprint canoeist who competed in the early 2000s. He won a gold medal in the K-4 200 m event at the 2002 ICF Canoe Sprint World Championships in Seville.

Kužel also competed in the K-1 1000 m event at the 2000 Summer Olympics in Sydney, but was eliminated in the semifinals.
