= Petr Netušil =

Medal record

Men's canoe sprint

World Championships
Silver medal – second place	2001 Poznań	C-4 200 m
Silver medal – second place	2002 Seville	C-2 200 m
Silver medal – second place	2003 Gainesville	C-2 200 m
Silver medal – second place	2003 Gainesville	C-4 200 m
Silver medal – second place	2005 Zagreb	C-4 200 m
Bronze medal – third place	1998 Szeged	C-4 1000 m

Petr Netušil is Czech sprint canoer who competed from the late 1990s to the mid-2000s. He won six medals at the ICF Canoe Sprint World Championships with five silvers (C-2 200 m: 2002, 2003; C-4 200 m: 2001, 2003, 2005) and one bronze C-4 1000 m: 1998).
