= Björn Bach =

German canoeist (born 1976)

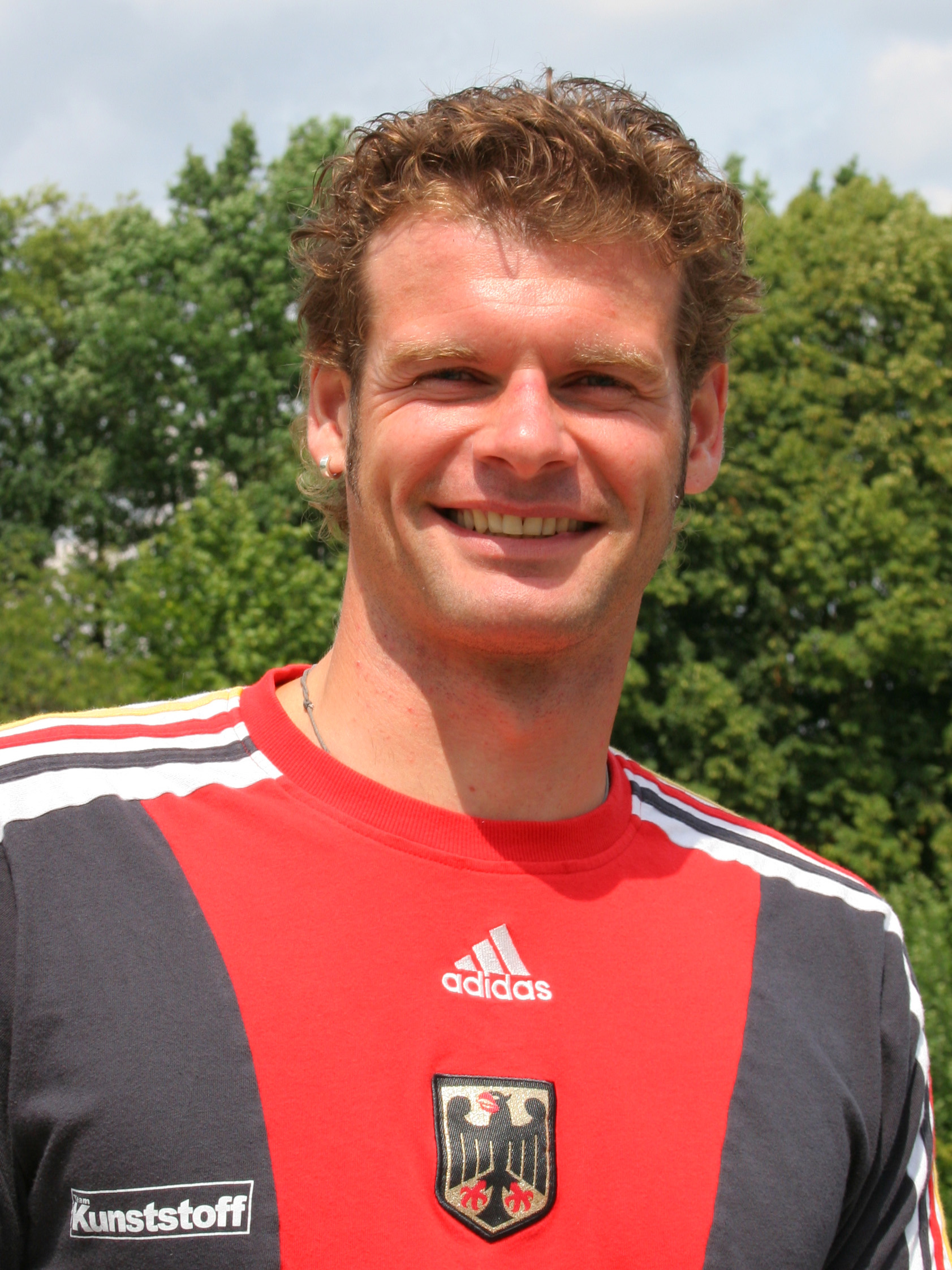

Medal record

Men's canoe sprint

Olympic Games
Silver medal – second place	2000 Sydney	K-4 1000 m
Silver medal – second place	2004 Athens	K-4 1000 m

World Championships
Gold medal – first place	1997 Dartmouth	K-4 1000 m
Gold medal – first place	1998 Szeged	K-4 500 m
Gold medal – first place	1998 Szeged	K-4 1000 m
Gold medal – first place	1999 Milan	K-4 500 m
Gold medal – first place	2001 Poznań	K-4 1000 m
Gold medal – first place	2005 Zagreb	K-4 1000 m
Silver medal – second place	1997 Dartmouth	K-4 500 m
Silver medal – second place	1999 Milan	K-4 1000 m
Silver medal – second place	2002 Seville	K-4 1000 m
Silver medal – second place	2005 Zagreb	K-4 200 m
Bronze medal – third place	1997 Dartmouth	K-4 200 m
Bronze medal – third place	2003 Gainesville	K-4 1000 m

Björn Bach (born 21 June 1976) is a German canoe sprinter who competed from 1997 to 2006. Competing in two Summer Olympics, he won two silver medals in the K-4 1000 m (2000, 2004).

Born in Magdeburg he took up the sport at the age of thirteen.

Bach won a dozen medals at the ICF Canoe Sprint World Championships with six golds (K-4 500 m: 1998, 1999; K-4 1000 m: 1997, 1998, 2001, 2005), four silvers (K-4 200 m: 2005, K-4 500 m: 1997, K-4 1000 m: 1999, 2002), and two bronzes (K-4 200 m: 1997, K-4 1000 m: 2003).

His most recent success came at the 2006 European Championships, held in Račice, Czech Republic, where he won a K-4 1000 m bronze medal. At the 2006 ICF Flatwater Racing World Championships however, he finished outside the medals with a fourth in the K-4 1000 m, sixth in the K-4 500 m, and fifth in the K-4 200 m, thus putting to an end Bach's record of having won medals at seven consecutive world championships.

At club level he competes for his home-town club, SC Magdeburg and is trained by Guido Behling.

Height: 1.95 m (6 ft 5 in) Weight: 92 kg (14 st 7) (203 lb)
