= Stefan Ulm =

German canoeist (born 1975)

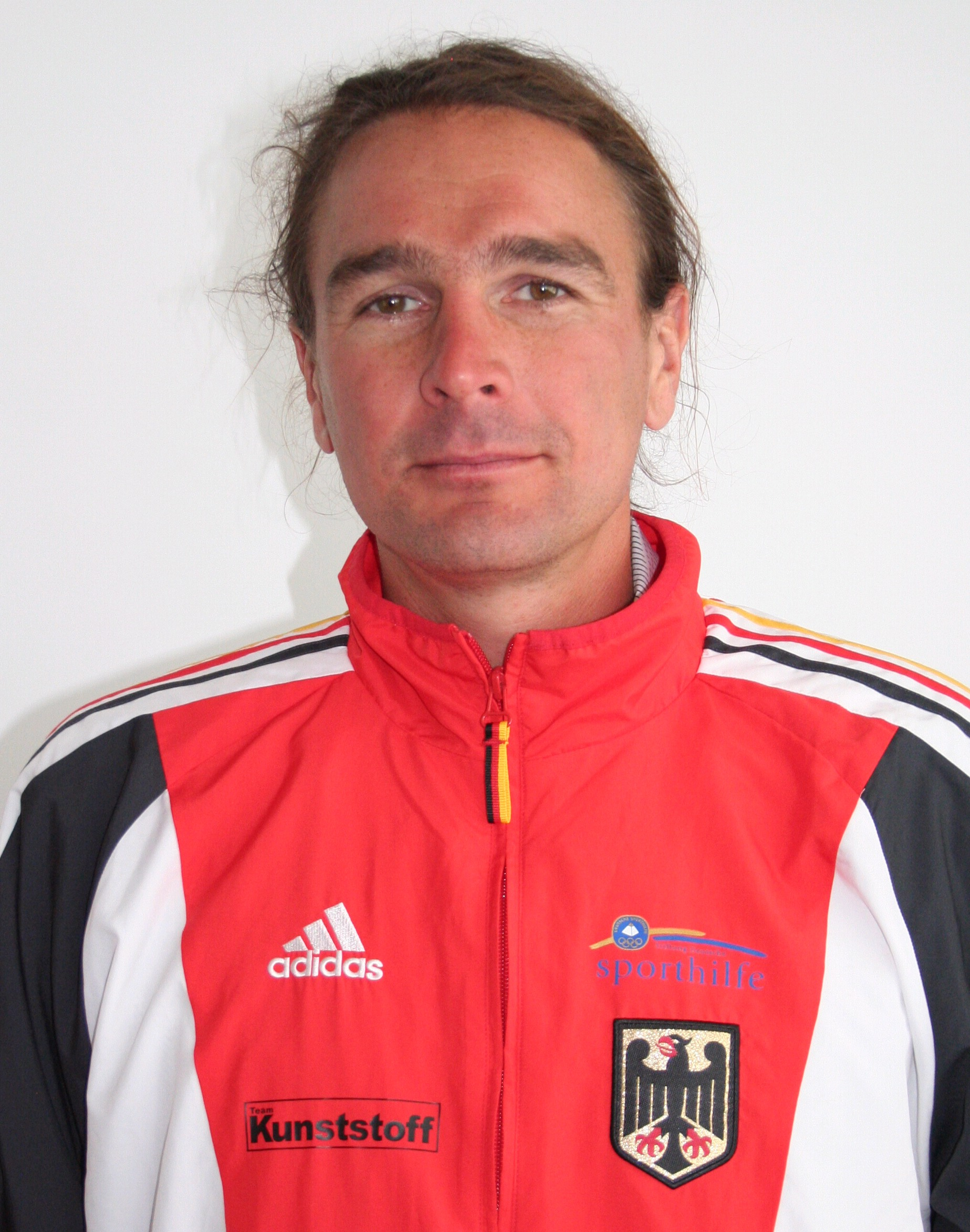

Personal information
- Born: 21 December 1975 (age 50) East Berlin, East Germany

Sport
- Country: Germany
- Sport: Canoe sprint
Medal record
Canoe sprint
Representing Germany
Olympic Games
Silver medal – second place	2000 Sydney	K-4 1000 m
Silver medal – second place	2004 Athens	K-4 1000 m
World Championships
Gold medal – first place	1997 Dartmouth	K-4 1000 m
Gold medal – first place	1998 Szeged	K-4 500 m
Gold medal – first place	1998 Szeged	K-4 1000 m
Gold medal – first place	1999 Milan	K-4 500 m
Gold medal – first place	2001 Poznań	K-4 1000 m
Silver medal – second place	1999 Milan	K-4 1000 m
Silver medal – second place	2002 Seville	K-4 1000 m
Bronze medal – third place	2003 Gainesville	K-4 1000 m

Stefan Ulm (born 21 December 1975) is a German sprint canoeist who competed from 1997 to 2004. Competing in two Summer Olympics, he won two silvers in the K-4 1000 m event (2000, 2004).

Ulm also won eight medals at the ICF Canoe Sprint World Championships with five golds (K-4 500 m: 1998, 1999; K-4 1000 m: 1997, 1998, 2001), two silvers (K-4 1000 m: 1999, 2002), and a bronze (K-4 1000 m: 2003).
