= Chirac Marcov =

Romanian canoeist

Medal record

Men's canoe sprint

World Championships
Bronze medal – third place	2001 Poznań	C-4 1000 m

Chirac Marcov is a Romanian sprint canoer who competed in the early 2000s. He won a bronze medal in the C-4 1000 m event at the 2001 ICF Canoe Sprint World Championships in Poznań.
