= Viktor Jiráský =

Czech canoeist

Medal record

Men's canoe sprint

World Championships
Bronze medal – third place	1998 Szeged	C-4 1000 m

Viktor Jiráský is a Czech sprint canoer and marathon canoeist who competed in the late 1990s. He won a bronze medal at the 1998 ICF Canoe Sprint World Championships in Szeged.
