= Gheorghe Andriev =

Romanian sprint canoeist

Personal information
- Born: 15 April 1968 (age 58) Carcaliu, Tulcea County, Romania

Sport
- Sport: Canoe sprint
Medal record
Representing Romania
Olympic Games
Bronze medal – third place	1996 Atlanta	C-2 500 m
World Championships
Gold medal – first place	1994 Mexico City	C-2 500 m
Silver medal – second place	1990 Poznań	C-2 1000 m
Silver medal – second place	1990 Poznań	C-2 10000 m
Silver medal – second place	1991 Paris	C-2 10000 m
Silver medal – second place	1998 Szeged	C-2 1000 m
Silver medal – second place	1998 Szeged	C-4 500 m
Silver medal – second place	1999 Milan	C-4 500 m
Bronze medal – third place	1999 Milan	C-4 200 m
Summer Universiade
Silver medal – second place	1987 Zagreb	C-2 500 m
Bronze medal – third place	1987 Zagreb	C-2 1000 m

Gheorghe Andriev (born 15 April 1968) is a Romanian sprint canoeist who competed from the late 1980s to the late 1990s. Competing in three Summer Olympics, he won a bronze medal in the C-2 500 m event at Atlanta in 1996.

Andriev also won eight medals at the ICF Canoe Sprint World Championships with a gold (C-2 500 m: 1994), six silvers (C-2 1000 m: 1990, 1998; C-2 10000 m: 1990, 1991; C-4 500 m: 1998, 1999), and one bronze (C-4 200 m: 1999).
