= Attila Végh (poet) =

Attila Végh (born Budapest 13 February 1962) is a Hungarian poet, philosopher and essayist. He won an Attila József Prize for poetry in 2012.

Végh is known for magazine editorials and social criticism, is host of the poetry forum of the Café Budapest Contemporary Arts Festival (formerly known as the Budapest Autumn Festival).
