= Petar Merkov =

Bulgarian sprint canoer (born 1976)

Medal record

Men's canoe sprint

Olympic Games
Silver medal – second place	2000 Sydney	K-1 500 m
Silver medal – second place	2000 Sydney	K-1 1000 m

World Championships
Silver medal – second place	1999 Milan	K-1 500 m
Silver medal – second place	2002 Seville	K-1 500 m
Bronze medal – third place	2002 Seville	K-4 1000 m

Petar Hristov Merkov (Bulgarian: Петър Христов Мерков, born 3 November 1976 in Plovdiv) is a Bulgarian sprint canoeist who competed in the late 1990s and early 2000s (decade). Competing in three Summer Olympics, he who won two silver medals at Sydney in 2000 (K-1 500 m, K-1 1000 m). Prior to those games, Merkov was subjected to controversy for failing a doping test in Bulgaria which led to over a dozen canoeing nations petitioning the International Canoe Federation for an investigation, only to have Bulgarian officials stonewall on his behalf to compete. He would later refuse to attend the post-race press conference of K-1 1000 m in the wake of those allegations.

Merkov was K-1 500 m European champion in 1999.

At the ICF Canoe Sprint World Championships, Merkov won silver medals in the K-1 500 m event in 1999 and 2002. In 2002, he also won a bronze in K-4 1000 m.

Merkov is 188 cm (6 ft 2 in) tall and weighs 95 kg (209 lb). He is currently a member of the Levski Canoe/Kayak Club in Sofia.
