= Vladislav Polzounov =

Russian canoeist

Medal record

Men's canoe sprint

World Championships
Silver medal – second place	1997 Dartmouth	C-4 1000 m
Bronze medal – third place	1997 Dartmouth	C-4 500 m
Bronze medal – third place	1998 Szeged	C-2 200 m
Bronze medal – third place	1998 Szeged	C-4 500 m
Bronze medal – third place	2001 Poznań	C-4 200 m

Vladislav Polzounov is a Russian sprint canoer who competed in the late 1990s. He won five medals at the ICF Canoe Sprint World Championships with one silver (C-4 1000 m: 1997) and four bronzes (C-2 200 m: 1998, C-4 200 m: 2001, C-4 500 m: 1997, 1998).
