= Juraj Bača =

Slovak canoeist (born 1977)

Medal record

Men's canoe sprint

Representing Slovakia

Olympic Games
Bronze medal – third place	2004 Athens	K-4 1000 m

World Championships
Gold medal – first place	1998 Szeged	K-2 500 m
Gold medal – first place	1999 Milan	K-2 1000 m
Gold medal – first place	2002 Seville	K-4 500 m
Gold medal – first place	2002 Seville	K-4 1000 m
Gold medal – first place	2003 Gainesville	K-4 500 m
Gold medal – first place	2003 Gainesville	K-4 1000 m
Bronze medal – third place	2001 Poznań	K-4 500 m

Juraj Bača (born 17 March 1977 in Komárno) is a Slovak sprint canoeist who competed from 1998 to 2005. Competing in two Summer Olympics, he won a bronze medal in the K-4 1000 m event at Athens in 2004.

Bača also won seven medals at the ICF Canoe Sprint World Championships with six golds (K-2 500 m: 1998, K-2 1000 m: 1999, K-4 500 m: 2002, 2003; K-4 1000 m: 2002, 2003) and one bronze (K-4 500 m: 2001).

After retiring from competition, Bača now works as a kayak coach. In autumn 2006 he appeared on the celebrity TV dance competition Let's Dance.

Bača was a member of the ŠKP Bratislava club. He is 186 cm (6 ft 1 in) tall and raced at 86 kg (190 lb).
