= Jan Břečka =

Czech canoeist

Medal record

Men's canoe sprint

World Championships
Gold medal – first place	2006 Szeged	C-4 200 m
Silver medal – second place	1999 Milan	C-4 200 m
Silver medal – second place	2001 Poznań	C-4 200 m
Silver medal – second place	2002 Seville	C-4 200 m
Silver medal – second place	2003 Gainesville	C-4 200 m
Silver medal – second place	2005 Zagreb	C-4 200 m

Jan Břečka (born 13 October 1975 in Pardubice) is a Czech sprint canoeist who competed from 1999 to 2006. He won six medals in the C-4 200 m event at the ICF Canoe Sprint World Championships with a gold (2006) and five silvers (1999, 2001, 2002, 2003, 2005).

Břečka also competed at the 2000 Summer Olympics in Sydney, but was eliminated in the semifinal round of both the C-2 500 m and C-2 1000 m events.
