= Iosif Anisim =

Romanian sprint canoer

Medal record

Men's canoe sprint

World Championships
Gold medal – first place	2001 Poznań	C-4 500 m
Silver medal – second place	1999 Milan	C-4 1000 m
Bronze medal – third place	2001 Poznań	C-4 1000 m

Iosif Anisim is a Romanian sprint canoeist who competed in the late 1990s and early 2000s. He won a complete set of medals at the ICF Canoe Sprint World Championships: a gold (C-4 500 m: 2001), a silver (C-4 1000 m: 1999), and a bronze (C-4 1000 m: 2001).
