= Gábor Furdok =

Hungarian canoeist

Medal record

Men's canoe sprint

World Championships
Bronze medal – third place	2003 Gainesville	C-4 500 m

Gábor Furdok is a Hungarian sprint canoer and marathon canoeist who has competed in the early 2000s. He won a bronze medal in the C-4 500 m event at the 2003 ICF Canoe Sprint World Championships in Gainesville.
