= Izaskun Aramburu =

Spanish sprint canoer

Medal record

Women's canoe sprint

Representing Spain

World Championships
Gold medal – first place	1999 Milan	K-2 200 m
Gold medal – first place	2001 Poznań	K-2 200 m
Bronze medal – third place	1997 Dartmouth	K-2 500 m
Bronze medal – third place	1997 Dartmouth	K-4 500 m
Bronze medal – third place	1998 Szeged	K-2 200 m
Bronze medal – third place	1998 Szeged	K-4 500 m

Izaskun Aramburu Balda (born December 29, 1975) is a Spanish sprint canoer who has competed from the mid-1990s to the early 2000s (decade). She won six medals at the ICF Canoe Sprint World Championships with two golds (K-2 200 m: 1999, 2001), and four bronzes (K-2 200 m: 1998, K-2 500 m: 1997;, K-4 500 m: 1997, 1998).

Aramburu also competed in two Summer Olympics, earning her best finish of sixth on two occasions (K-2 500 m and K-4 500 m: both 1996).
