= Florin Popescu =

Romanian canoeist

Medal record

Men's canoe sprint

Representing Romania

Olympic Games
Gold medal – first place	2000 Sydney	C-2 1000 m
Bronze medal – third place	2000 Sydney	C-2 500 m

World Championships
Gold medal – first place	1995 Duisburg	C-4 1000 m
Gold medal – first place	1997 Dartmouth	C-4 1000 m
Gold medal – first place	2001 Poznań	C-4 500 m
Gold medal – first place	2002 Seville	C-4 500 m
Gold medal – first place	2003 Gainesville	C-2 1000 m
Gold medal – first place	2003 Gainesville	C-4 500 m
Gold medal – first place	2005 Zagreb	C-4 500 m
Silver medal – second place	1994 Mexico City	C-4 500 m
Silver medal – second place	1994 Mexico City	C-4 1000 m
Silver medal – second place	1995 Duisburg	C-4 500 m
Silver medal – second place	1997 Dartmouth	C-4 500 m
Silver medal – second place	1998 Szeged	C-2 1000 m
Silver medal – second place	1998 Szeged	C-4 500 m
Silver medal – second place	1999 Milan	C-4 500 m
Silver medal – second place	2002 Seville	C-2 500 m
Silver medal – second place	2003 Gainesville	C-2 500 m
Bronze medal – third place	1999 Milan	C-4 200 m
Bronze medal – third place	2001 Poznań	C-2 500 m
Bronze medal – third place	2003 Gainesville	C-4 200 m

Florin Popescu (born 30 August 1974 in Iancu Jianu, Olt) is a Romanian canoe sprinter who competed from the mid-1990s to 2005. Competing in two Summer Olympics, he won two Olympic medals at Sydney in 2000 with teammate Mitică Pricop (gold: C-2 1000 m, bronze: C-2 500 m). He won a total of seven world championship gold medals (and nineteen total) as well as seven European championship golds, making him the most successful Romanian paddler of modern times.

Injury forced Popescu to retire at the end of the 2005 season after winning his seventh world title (C-4 500 m) at the World Championships in Zagreb, Croatia.

Popescu is 183 cm (6 ft 0 in) tall and raced at 79 kg (174 lb). He lists his interests as football, motor racing and handball. He was voted Romanian Sportsman of the Year in 1993.
