= Ionel Averian =

Romanian sprint canoer

Medal record

Men's canoe sprint

World Championships
Gold medal – first place	2001 Poznań	C-4 500 m
Gold medal – first place	2002 Seville	C-4 500 m
Silver medal – second place	1998 Szeged	C-4 500 m
Silver medal – second place	1999 Milan	C-4 500 m
Silver medal – second place	1999 Milan	C-4 1000 m
Silver medal – second place	2001 Poznań	C-2 200 m
Bronze medal – third place	1999 Milan	C-4 200 m
Bronze medal – third place	2001 Poznań	C-4 1000 m
Bronze medal – third place	2002 Seville	C-2 200 m
Bronze medal – third place	2002 Seville	C-4 200 m

Ionel Averian (born 2 October 1976 in Hârșova, Constanța County) is a Romanian sprint canoer who competed from the late 1990s to the early 2000s. He won ten medals at the ICF Canoe Sprint World Championships with two golds (C-4 500 m: 2001, 2002), four silvers (C-2 200 m: 2001, C-4 500 m: 1999, 2001; C-4 1000 m: 1999), and four bronzes (C-2 200 m: 2002, C-4 200 m: 1999, 2002; C-4 1000 m: 2001).
