= Beatriz Manchón =

Spanish canoeist

Medal record

Women's canoe sprint

World Championships
| Gold medal – first place | 1999 Milan | K-2 200 m |
| Gold medal – first place | 2002 Seville | K-2 200 m |
| Silver medal – second place | 2002 Seville | K-4 200 m |
| Silver medal – second place | 2003 Gainesville | K-2 200 m |
| Silver medal – second place | 2003 Gainesville | K-4 200 m |
| Bronze medal – third place | 1997 Dartmouth | K-2 500 m |
| Bronze medal – third place | 1997 Dartmouth | K-4 500 m |
| Bronze medal – third place | 1998 Szeged | K-2 200 m |
| Bronze medal – third place | 1998 Szeged | K-4 500 m |
| Bronze medal – third place | 2001 Poznań | K-2 500 m |
| Bronze medal – third place | 2001 Poznań | K-2 1000 m |
| Bronze medal – third place | 2002 Seville | K-2 500 m |
| Bronze medal – third place | 2002 Seville | K-4 500 m |
| Bronze medal – third place | 2003 Gainesville | K-4 500 m |
| Bronze medal – third place | 2009 Dartmouth | K-4 500 m |

European Championships
| Bronze medal – third place | 2012 Zagreb | K-2 1000 m |

Beatriz Manchón Portillo (born 29 May 1976 in Sevilla) is a Spanish sprint canoeist who has competed since the mid-1990s. She won fifteen medals at the ICF Canoe Sprint World Championships with two golds (K-2 200 m: 1999, 2002), three silvers (K-2 200 m: 2003, K-4 200 m: 2002, 2003), and ten bronzes (K-2 200 m: 1998, K-2 500 m: 1997, 2001, 2002; K-2 1000 m: 2001, K-4 500 m: 1997, 1998, 2002, 2003, 2009).

Manchón also competed in four Summer Olympics, earning her best finish of fifth on three occasions (2004: K-2 500 m, K-4 500 m; 2008: K-4 500 m).
