= Ákos Vereckei =

Hungarian canoeist (born 1977)

Ákos Vereczkei
Personal information
- Nationality: Hungarian
- Born: August 26, 1977 (age 49) Budapest, Hungary
- Height: 1.88 m (6 ft 2 in)
- Weight: 88 kg (194 lb)

Sport
- Sport: Canoe sprint
- Club: Pestvidéki Gépgyár SK (1987-1991); Csepel SC (1991-2001); Bp. Honvéd (2001-2013)
- Retired: 2013
Medal record
Men's canoe sprint
Representing Hungary
Event	1st	2nd	3rd
Olympic Games	2	0	0
World Championships	6	2	2
European Championships	8	6	0
Total	16	8	2
Olympic Games
Gold medal – first place	2000 Sydney	K-4 1000 m
Gold medal – first place	2004 Athens	K-4 1000 m
World Championships
Gold medal – first place	1997 Dartmouth	K-4 500 m
Gold medal – first place	1998 Szeged	K-1 500 m
Gold medal – first place	1999 Milan	K-1 500 m
Gold medal – first place	1999 Milan	K-4 1000 m
Gold medal – first place	2001 Poznań	K-1 500 m
Gold medal – first place	2006 Szeged	K-4 1000 m
Silver medal – second place	2003 Gainesville	K-4 1000 m
Silver medal – second place	2010 Poznań	K-2 1000 m
Bronze medal – third place	1999 Milan	K-4 500 m
Bronze medal – third place	2002 Seville	K-2 1000 m

Ákos Vereckei (Sometimes listes as Ákos Vereczkei, born August 26, 1977, in Budapest) is a Hungarian sprint canoeist who has competed since the late 1990s. Competing in three Summer Olympics, he won two gold medals in the K-4 1000 m events (2000, 2004).

Vereckei also won ten medals at the ICF Canoe Sprint World Championships with six golds (K-1 500 m: 1998, 1999, 2001; K-4 500 m: 1997, K-4 1000 m: 1999; K-4 1000 m: 2006), two silvers (K-2 1000 m: 2010, K-4 1000 m: 2003), and two bronzes (K-2 1000 m: 2002, K-4 500 m: 1999).

A member of the Budapest Honvéd FC club, he is 188 cm (6 ft 2 in) tall and weighs 88 kg (194 lb).

== Awards ==
- Hungarian kayaker of the Year (6): 1998, 1999, 2001, 2002, 2003, 2004
- Honorary Citizen of Csepel (2000)

Orders and special awards

- Order of Merit of the Republic of Hungary – Officer's Cross (2000)
- Order of Merit of the Republic of Hungary – Commander's Cross (2004)
- Republic of Hungary Coat of arms, adorned with gold rings and Certificate of Merit (2008)
