= Ana María Penas =

Spanish canoeist

Medal record

Women's canoe sprint

World Championships
Silver medal – second place	2001 Poznań	K-4 200 m
Bronze medal – third place	1997 Dartmouth	K-4 500 m
Bronze medal – third place	1998 Szeged	K-4 500 m
Bronze medal – third place	2001 Poznań	K-4 500 m

Ana María Penas Balchada (born December 21, 1971, in Pontevedra) is a Spanish sprint canoer who competed from the early 1990s to the early 2000s (decade). She won four medals at the ICF Canoe Sprint World Championships with a silver (K-4 200 m: 2001) and three bronzes (K-4 500 m: 1997, 1998, 2001).

Penas also competed in three Summer Olympics, earning her best finish of sixth in the K-4 500 m event at Atlanta in 1996.
