= Vince Fehérvári =

Australian canoeist

Medal record

Men's canoe sprint

World Championships
Gold medal – first place	1997 Dartmouth	K-1 200 m
Gold medal – first place	1997 Dartmouth	K-2 200 m
Gold medal – first place	1998 Szeged	K-2 200 m
Gold medal – first place	1998 Szeged	K-4 200 m
Gold medal – first place	1999 Milan	K-2 200 m
Gold medal – first place	1999 Milan	K-4 200 m
Gold medal – first place	2001 Poznań	K-4 200 m
Silver medal – second place	1994 Mexico City	K-1 200 m
Silver medal – second place	1997 Dartmouth	K-4 200 m
Silver medal – second place	2003 Gainesville	K-1 200 m
Bronze medal – third place	1993 Copenhagen	K-4 500 m
Bronze medal – third place	2002 Seville	K-4 200 m

Vince Fehérvári is a Hungarian-born, Australian sprint canoeist who competed from the mid-1990s to the mid-2000s. He won twelve medals at ICF Canoe Sprint World Championships with seven golds (K-1 200 m: 1997, K-2 200 m: 1997, 1998, 1999; K-4 200 m: 1998, 1999, 2001), three silvers (K-1 200 m: 1994, 2003; K-4 200 m: 1997), and two bronzes (K-4 200 m: 2002, K-4 500 m: 1993).

Fehérvári's 2003 K-1 200 m silver medal was for Australia while his other medals were for Hungary.
