= Attila Végh (canoeist) =

Hungarian sprint canoer

Medal record

Men's canoe sprint

World Championships
Silver medal – second place	1998 Szeged	C-2 200 m

Attila Végh is a Hungarian sprint canoer who competed in the late 1990s.

He won a silver medal in the C-2 200 m event in 1997 and again at the 1998 ICF Canoe Sprint World Championships in Szeged, a team gold in 2002, and a solo bronze in 2008 in Milan:

- Team 1997 Athletics C-2 - Sprint Championship canoe 200 m silver 36 328
- Team 1998 Athletics C-2 - Sprint World Championships 200m canoe silver 38 473
- Team 2002 Athletics C-2 - Sprint Championship in Szeged canoe 200 m gold 36 899
- 2008 Canoe Sprint C-2 - Sprint Championship Milan canoe 200 m bronze 38 577
