= Romică Șerban =

Romanian sprint canoer (born 1970)

Medal record

Men's canoe sprint

World Championships
Silver medal – second place	1994 Mexico City	K-2 200 m
Silver medal – second place	1995 Duisburg	K-2 200 m
Silver medal – second place	2001 Poznań	K-4 500 m
Silver medal – second place	2003 Gainesville	K-4 200 m
Silver medal – second place	2003 Gainesville	K-4 500 m
Bronze medal – third place	1998 Szeged	K-2 200 m
Bronze medal – third place	1999 Milan	K-4 1000 m

Nicu Romică Şerban (born 18 January 1970) is a Romanian sprint canoer who competed from the early 1990s to the mid-2000s (decade). He won seven medals at the ICF Canoe Sprint World Championships with five silvers (K-2 200 m: 1994, 1995, 2003; K-4 500 m: 2001, 2003) and two bronzes (K-2 200 m: 1998, K-4 1000 m: 1999).

Şerban also competed in three Summer Olympics, earning his best finish of seventh in the K-4 1000 m event at Barcelona in 1992.
