= Kinga Bóta =

Hungarian canoeist (born 1977)

Medal record

Women's canoe sprint

Olympic Games
Silver medal – second place	2004 Athens	K-4 500 m

World Championships
Gold medal – first place	2001 Poznań	K-2 500 m
Gold medal – first place	2001 Poznań	K-4 500 m
Gold medal – first place	2001 Poznań	K-4 1000 m
Gold medal – first place	2002 Seville	K-2 500 m
Gold medal – first place	2002 Seville	K-2 1000 m
Gold medal – first place	2002 Seville	K-4 500 m
Gold medal – first place	2003 Gainesville	K-2 500 m
Gold medal – first place	2003 Gainesville	K-4 200 m
Gold medal – first place	2003 Gainesville	K-4 500 m
Gold medal – first place	2005 Zagreb	K-4 1000 m
Bronze medal – third place	1999 Milan	K-2 1000 m
Bronze medal – third place	2005 Zagreb	K-4 500 m

Kinga Bóta (born 22 August 1977) is a Hungarian canoe sprinter who competed from 1999 to 2005. She won silver medal in the K-4 500 m event at the 2004 Summer Olympics in Athens.

Bóta has also had outstanding success at the ICF Canoe Sprint World Championships, winning twelve medals. This included ten golds (K-2 500 m: 2001, 2002, 2003; K-2 1000 m: 2002, K-4 500 m: 2001, 2002, 2003; K-4 1000 m: 2001, 2005) and two bronzes (K-2 1000 m: 1999, K-4 500 m: 2005).
