= Canoe Sprint European Championships =

International canoeing and kayaking event

European Canoe Sprint Championships
- Status: active
- Genre: sporting event
- Date: mid-year
- Frequency: annual
- Country: varying
- Inaugurated: 1933

The Canoe Sprint European Championships (or European Canoe Sprint Championships) is an international canoeing and kayaking event organized by the European Canoe Association (ECA). It was first held in 1933 in Prague under the auspices of the International Canoe Federation. In 1997, the European Championships were resumed, and now take place annually.

The most titled athlete of the European Championships is Hungarian Katalin Kovács, who has 29 gold medals, 17 silver medals and 2 bronze medals in her record. Among men, the number of wins is led by German Ronald Rauhe, who won the European championships 17 times.

== Editions ==
Edition	Year	Host	Events
1	1933	Prague, Czechoslovakia	7
2	1934	Copenhagen, Denmark	8
3	1936	(Nazi Germany) Duisburg, Germany	2
4	1957	Ghent, Belgium	15
5	1959	Duisburg, West Germany	15
6	1961	Poznań, Poland	16
7	1963	(Socialist Federal Republic of Yugoslavia) Jajce, Yugoslavia	16
8	1965	Bucharest, Romania	16
9	1967	Duisburg, West Germany	16
10	1969	Moscow, Soviet Union	16
Not organised 1970 - 1996
11	1997	Plovdiv, Bulgaria	26
12	1999	Zagreb, Croatia	26
13	2000	Poznań, Poland	26
14	2001	Milan, Italy	27
15	2002	Szeged, Hungary	27
16	2004	Poznań, Poland	27
17	2005	Poznań, Poland	27
18	2006	Račice, Czech Republic	27
19	2007	Pontevedra, Spain	27
20	2008	Milan, Italy	27
21	2009	Brandenburg an der Havel, Germany	27
22	2010	Trasona, Spain	24+1
23	2011	Belgrade, Serbia	25
24	2012	Zagreb, Croatia	26
25	2013	Montemor-o-Velho, Portugal	26 + 9
26	2014	Brandenburg an der Havel, Germany	26 + 8
27	2015	Račice, Czech Republic	27 + 11
28	2016	Moscow, Russia	27 + 11
29	2017	Plovdiv, Bulgaria	27 + 10
30	2018	Belgrade, Serbia	30 + 10
–	2019*	Poznań, Poland	12
–	2020	Bascov, Romania	–
31	2021	Poznań, Poland	30 + 12
32	2022	Munich, Germany	29 + 11
33	2023*	Montemor-o-Velho, Portugal	
34	2024	Szeged, Hungary	29 + 10
35	2025	Racine, Czech Republic	23 + 12

- 2023 Paracanoe only, since Canoe Sprint was included in the European Games.
- Canoe slalom at the 2023 European Games
- Canoe sprint at the 2023 European Games

=== Notes ===
- The 1963 world championships were designated that year's European championships.
- The ECA chose not to organise the 2019 championships because of the European Games, so a separate Paracanoe European Championships were held as a result.
- The 2020 championships were cancelled due to the COVID-19 pandemic.
- Paracanoe added to the 2010 championships, then subsequent championships from 2013 onwards.

== European Junior and U23 Canoe Sprint Championships ==
Edition	Year	Host venue	Events
Junior
1	1998	Nyköping, Sweden	
2	2000	Boulogne-sur-mer, France	
3	2002	Zagreb, Croatia	
4	2004	Poznań, Poland	
5	2006	Athens, Greece	
Junior and U23
6 + 1	2007	Belgrade, Serbia	
7 + 2	2008	Szeged, Hungary	
8 + 3	2009	Poznań, Poland	
9 + 4	2010	Moscow, Russia	
10 + 5	2011	Zagreb, Croatia	
11 + 6	2012	Montemor-o-Velho, Portugal	21 + 21
12 + 7	2013	Poznań, Poland	21 + 21
13 + 8	2014	Mantes-en-Yvelines, France	21 + 21
14 + 9	2015	Pitești, Romania	22 + 22
15 + 10	2016	Plovdiv, Bulgaria	23 + 23
16 + 11	2017	Belgrade, Serbia	23 + 23
17 + 12	2018	Auronzo, Italy	18 + 18
18 + 13	2019	Račice, Czech Republic	18 + 18
19 + 14	2020	Moscow, Russia (cancelled)	
20 + 15	2021	Poznań, Poland	
21 + 16	2022	Belgrade, Serbia	
22 + 17	2023	Auronzo, Italy	
23 + 18	2024	Bratislava, Slovakia	
24 + 19	2025	Pitești, Romania	

- 2020 Moscow, Russia - Cancelled due to the COVID-19 pandemic.

=== Junior Flatwater Racing ===
- 1996
- 1998
- 2000 FRA Boulogna-Sur-Mer 21./23 July only Junior

=== Junior and U23 Flatwater Racing ===
- 2002 Zagreb, Croatia – only Junior
- 2004 Poznań, Poland 22–25 July
- 2006 Athens, Greece 3–6 August
- 2007 Under 23 and Junior European Championships – Belgrade, Serbia
- 2008 Junior & Under 23 European Championship – Szeged, Hungary – 17–20 July 2008
- 2009 Poznań, Poland
- 2010 Junior and U23 European Championships 2010
- 2011 30 June - 3 July - Junior & U23 European Championships, Zargreb

European Sprint Championships U-23 2020 is the 123rd edition of this competition. The competition takes place from 2 July till 5 July 2020 in Moscow in Russia. (not held)

European Sprint Championships U-23 - Results Women 2021 Poland – Poznań – 24 June 2021 – 27 June 2021

European Sprint Championships U-23 2022 - Medal Table Serbia – Belgrade – 23 June 2022 – 26 June 2022

== Senior Medals ==
=== Canoe (1933–2024) ===
The following table lists all the medals won by each nation since the 1933 edition. Exhibition events are not included in this ranking.

Rank	Nation	Gold	Silver	Bronze	Total
1	Hungary	177	139	93	409
2	Germany	125	113	95	333
3	Russia	65	55	65	185
4	Romania	49	57	43	149
5	Belarus	43	44	38	125
6	Poland	40	69	72	181
7	Soviet Union	40	33	26	99
8	Czech Republic	25	15	25	65
9	Spain	23	37	45	105
10	Slovakia	17	20	13	50
11	Denmark	15	20	16	51
12	Lithuania	14	10	16	40
13	Italy	14	8	21	43
14	Great Britain	13	8	10	31
15	Ukraine	12	19	32	63
16	Portugal	11	10	17	38
17	Serbia	10	12	13	35
18	Sweden	7	24	16	47
19	Norway	7	5	9	21
20	East Germany	6	5	12	23
21	France	5	11	8	24
22	Bulgaria	5	7	12	24
23	Czechoslovakia	5	6	7	18
24	Azerbaijan	5	3	1	9
25	Austria	2	3	8	13
26	Israel	2	2	3	7
27	Moldova	1	4	5	10
28	Slovenia	1	3	4	8
29	Georgia	1	0	3	4
30	Turkey	1	0	0	1
31	Belgium	0	2	5	7
32	Finland	0	2	4	6
33	Croatia	0	1	3	4
34	Latvia	0	1	2	3
35	Netherlands	0	0	3	3
36	Ireland	0	0	1	1
36	Switzerland	0	0	1	1
36	Yugoslavia	0	0	1	1
Totals (38 entries)		741	748	748	2,237

=== Para Canoe (2017–2022) ===
3 events in 2019 Paracanoe European Championships and 1 event (Men's VL1) from the 2022 Canoe Sprint European Championships are not included in the medal table due to lack of participation.

Rank	Nation	Gold	Silver	Bronze	Total
1	Great Britain	13	11	9	33
2	Ukraine	11	5	4	20
3	Hungary	5	2	6	13
4	Italy	4	6	3	13
5	Germany	4	2	6	12
6	Russia	3	10	9	22
7	Austria	3	2	0	5
8	France	1	3	5	9
9	Poland	1	3	4	8
10	Spain	1	3	0	4
11	Portugal	1	0	2	3
12	Sweden	1	0	1	2
13	Ireland	1	0	0	1
14	Romania	0	2	0	2
Totals (14 entries)		49	49	49	147

== Junior and U23 Medals ==
Source: https://timetable.europecanoeevents.com/index.php?gmt=0&gmt2=0

=== 2025 ===
https://timetable.europecanoeevents.com/index.php?gmt=0&gmt2=0

https://timetable.europecanoeevents.com/uploads/XML_Provas/130/pdf/Entries/Pitesti2025-StartListSummary.pdf

https://timetable.europecanoeevents.com/uploads/XML_Provas/130/pdf/Entries/Pitesti2025-CountryList.pdf

https://timetable.europecanoeevents.com/uploads/XML_Provas/130/pdf/Entries/Pitesti2025-CompetitorsList.pdf

Rank	Nation	Gold	Silver	Bronze	Total
1	Hungary	18	9	7	34
2	Ukraine	6	4	4	14
3	Poland	4	5	2	11
4	Italy	4	2	5	11
5	Czech Republic	2	5	3	10
6	Germany	2	2	3	7
7	Spain	1	6	4	11
8	Slovakia	1	3	0	4
9	Serbia	1	2	1	4
10	Romania	1	1	1	3
11	France	1	0	1	2
12	Denmark	1	0	0	1
13	Estonia	0	1	1	2
13	Georgia	0	1	1	2
13	Portugal	0	1	1	2
16	Slovenia	0	1	0	1
17	Turkey	0	0	3	3
18	Azerbaijan	0	0	1	1
18	Bulgaria	0	0	1	1
18	Lithuania	0	0	1	1
Totals (20 entries)		42	43	40	125

=== 2024 ===
https://www.europecanoeevents.com/events/results?gmt=-7&gmt2=420

Rank	Nation	Gold	Silver	Bronze	Total
1	Hungary	12	9	7	28
2	Ukraine	5	3	3	11
3	Czech Republic	4	4	2	10
4	Poland	3	9	4	16
5	Italy	2	4	1	7
6	Serbia	2	0	1	3
7	Denmark	2	0	0	2
7	Great Britain	2	0	0	2
9	Spain	1	4	6	11
10	Romania	1	1	1	3
11	Slovenia	1	1	0	2
12	France	1	0	2	3
12	Germany	1	0	2	3
14	Georgia	1	0	0	1
15	Slovakia	0	2	2	4
16	Portugal	0	1	2	3
17	Turkey	0	1	1	2
18	Switzerland	0	1	0	1
19	Bulgaria	0	0	1	1
19	Latvia	0	0	1	1
Totals (20 entries)		38	40	36	114

=== 2023 ===
Rank	Nation	Gold	Silver	Bronze	Total
1	Hungary	21	6	5	32
2	Spain	5	8	7	20
3	Germany	5	5	7	17
4	Italy	4	5	4	13
5	Poland	2	4	3	9
6	Ukraine	2	3	3	8
7	Czech Republic	2	1	2	5
8	Moldova	1	3	2	6
9	Portugal	1	2	1	4
10	Denmark	1	1	0	2
11	Norway	1	0	1	2
12	Latvia	0	2	0	2
13	Austria	0	1	1	2
13	Great Britain	0	1	1	2
13	Switzerland	0	1	1	2
16	Bulgaria	0	0	2	2
16	Israel	0	0	2	2
18	Georgia	0	0	1	1
18	Romania	0	0	1	1
Totals (19 entries)		45	43	44	132

== Most successful athletes ==
This following table lists athletes that have won multiple medals since the 1997 edition (updated until 2021).

Rank	Athlete	Gold	Silver	Bronze	Total
1	(Hungary) Katalin Kovács	29	17	2	48
2	(Hungary) Natasa Dusev-Janics	18	4	2	24
3	(Germany) Ronald Rauhe	17	9	2	28
4	(Hungary) Danuta Kozák	17	8	1	26
5	(Germany) Sebastian Brendel	15	5	2	22
6	(Russia) Maxim Opalev	14	6	3	23
7	(Czech Republic) Martin Fuksa	13	6	3	22
8	(Germany) Katrin Wagner-Augustin	12	11	5	28
9	(Russia) Ivan Shtyl	12	6	1	19
10	(Slovakia) Erik Vlček	11	7	4	22
11	(Slovakia) Michal Riszdorfer	11	4	1	16
12	(Germany) Tim Wieskötter	11	4	0	15
13	(Hungary) Tímea Paksy	10	10	2	22
14	(Belarus) Raman Piatrushenka	10	6	6	22
15	(Belarus) Vadzim Makhneu	10	6	5	21
16	(Hungary) Dalma Ružičić-Benedek	10	5	2	17
17	(Germany) Max Hoff	10	4	3	17
18	(Slovakia) Richard Riszdorfer	10	3	0	13
19	(Hungary) Szilvia Szabó	9	10	0	19
20	(Russia) Viktor Melantyev	9	1	2	12
21	(Hungary) Kinga Bóta	8	8	1	17
22	(Hungary) Ákos Vereckei	8	6	0	14
23	(Russia) Alexander Kostoglod	8	5	6	19
24	(Hungary) Tamara Csipes	8	5	1	14
25	(Italy) Josefa Idem	8	4	3	15
26	(Russia) Alexey Korovashkov	8	3	0	11
27	(Germany) Nicole Reinhardt	8	2	2	12
28	(Belarus) Maryna Litvinchuk	7	7	5	19
29	(Germany) Carolin Leonhardt	7	7	4	18
30	(Hungary) Zoltán Kammerer	7	7	2	16
31	(Romania) Florin Popescu	7	7	1	15
32	(Spain) Teresa Portela Rivas	7	4	6	17
33	(Russia) Nikolai Lipkin	7	2	1	10
34	(Norway) Eirik Verås Larsen	7	1	2	10
Totals (34 entries)		363	200	80	643

== See also ==
- International Canoe Federation
- ICF Canoe Sprint World Championships
- European Canoe Slalom Championships
- European Canoe Marathon Championships
