= 2005 Canoe Sprint European Championships =

International canoeing and kayaking event

The 2005 Canoe Sprint European Championships were held in Poznań, Poland.

== Medal overview ==
=== Men ===
Event	Gold	Time	Silver	Time	Bronze	Time
C1-200m	(Russia) Maksim Opalev	40.164	(Ukraine) Valentyn Demyanenko	40.266	(Poland) Paweł Baraszkiewicz	40.968
C2-200m	(Germany); Tomasz Wylenzek; Christian Gille	37.619	(Russia); Nikolai Lipkin; Evgeny Ignatov	37.757	(Hungary); Gergely Kovács; Attila Bozsik	37.901
C4-200m	(Czech Republic); Petr Procházka; Petr Fuksa; Petr Netušil; Jan Břečka	34.680	(Russia); Alexander Kovalev; Alexander Kostoglod; Roman Kruglyakov; Maksim Opalev	34.874	(Germany); Thomas Lück; Robert Nuck; Stefan Holtz; Stephan Breuing	34.988
K1-200m	(Spain) Carlos Pérez Rial	36.098	(Hungary) Gergely Boros	36.374	(Finland) Kimmo Latvamaki	36.470
K2-200m	(Poland); Adam Wysocki; Marek Twardowski	32.974	(Germany); Tim Wieskötter; Ronald Rauhe	33.016	(Serbia and Montenegro); Dragan Zorić; Ognjen Filipović	33.304
K4-200m	(Hungary); Gergely Gyertyános; Balázs Babella; István Beé; Viktor Kadler	30.673	(Czech Republic); Filip Svab; Pavel Holubar; Svatopluk Batka; Jan Sterba	30.907	(Germany); Björn Bach; Jonas Ems; Norman Bröckl; Björn Goldschmidt	31.051
C1-500m	(Russia) Maksim Opalev	1:48:450	(Poland) Paweł Baraszkiewicz	1:48.480	(Germany) Andreas Dittmer	1:48.564
C2-500m	(Germany); Tomasz Wylenzek; Christian Gille	1:41.667	(Poland); Michał Śliwiński; Łukasz Woszczyński	1:42.267	(Russia); Alexander Kovalev; Alexander Kostoglod	1:43.173
C4-500m	(Romania); Silviu Simioncencu; Loredan Popa; Florin Popescu; Josif Chirilă	1:33.057	(Poland); Adam Ginter; Michał Gajownik; Andrzej Jezierski; Roman Rynkiewicz	1:33.897	(Germany); Thomas Lück; Stephan Breuing; Robert Nuck; Stefan Holtz	1:34.899
K1-500m	(Hungary) Ákos Vereckei	1:38.493	(Germany) Lutz Altepost	1:39.123	(Croatia) Stjepan Janic	1:39.333
K2-500m	(Germany); Ronald Rauhe; Tim Wieskötter	1:28.860	(Poland); Marek Twardowski; Adam Wysocki	1:29.268	(Hungary); Gábor Kucsera; Zoltán Kammerer	1:30.312
K4-500m	(Belarus); Vadzim Makhneu; Aliaksei Abalmasau; Dziamyan Turchyn; Raman Piatrushenka	1:21.315	(Slovakia); Michal Riszdorfer; Juraj Tarr; Andrej Wiebauer; Róbert Erban	1:21.597	(Romania); Marian Baban; Ștefan Vasile; Alin Anton; Florean Mada	1:22.353
C1-1000m	(Germany) Andreas Dittmer	3:49.686	(Russia) Maksim Opalev	3:52.218	(Belarus) Aliaksandr Zhukouski	3:54.906
C2-1000m	(Germany); Tomasz Wylenzek; Christian Gille	3:31.336	(Hungary); György Kolonics; György Kozmann	3:33.676	(Poland); Paweł Skowroński; Roman Rynkiewicz	3:34.030
C4-1000m	(Germany); Thomas Lück; Stephan Breuing; Stefan Holtz; Robert Nuck	3:17.096	(Poland); Wojciech Tyszyński; Andrzej Jezierski; Arkadiusz Toński; Michał Gajownik	3:17.714	(Romania); Ciprian Popa; Petre Condrat; Florin Mironcic; Loredan Popa	3:17.972
K1-1000m	(Norway) Eirik Verås Larsen	3:27.274	(Hungary) Zoltán Benkő	3:28.426	(Portugal) Emanuel Silva	3:29.674
K2-1000m	(Romania); Ionuţ Anghel; Marian Sevici	3:12.417	(Hungary); Roland Kökény; Gábor Kucsera	3:13.515	(Germany); Marco Herszel; Andreas Ihle	3:14.379
K4-1000m	(Slovakia); Michal Riszdorfer; Róbert Erban; Erik Vlček; Richard Riszdorfer	2:49.875	(Romania); Florean Mada; Alin Anton; Marian Baban; Ștefan Vasile	2:51.015	(Poland); Marek Twardowski; Adam Wysocki; Tomasz Mendelski; Paweł Baumann	2:52.035

=== Women ===
Event	Gold	Time	Silver	Time	Bronze	Time
K1-200m	(Hungary) Szilvia Szabó	41.892	(Germany) Conny Waßmuth	42.228	(Finland) Jenni Honkanen	42.360
K2-200m	(Hungary); Nataša Janić; Katalin Kovács	37.392	(Slovakia); Martina Kohlová; Ivana Kmetová	38.239	(Germany); Fanny Fischer; Birgit Fischer	38.388
K4-200m	(Germany); Judith Hörmann; Nicole Reinhardt; Carolin Leonhardt; Katrin Wagner-Augustin	34.987	(Hungary); Krisztina Fazekas; Tímea Paksy; Melinda Patyi; Erzsébet Viski	35.113	(Sweden); Anna Karlsson; Josefin Nordlöw; Sofia Paldanius; Karin Johansson	35.767
K1-500m	(Germany) Nicole Reinhardt	1:51.946	(Hungary) Erzsébet Viski	1:52.138	(Poland) Karolina Głażewska	1:52.486
K2-500m	(Hungary); Katalin Kovács; Nataša Janić	1:41.959	(Germany); Maike Nollen; Nadine Opgen-Rhein	1:44.275	(France); Marie Delattre; Anne-Laure Viard	1:44.515
K4-500m	(Germany); Judith Hörmann; Katrin Wagner-Augustin; Carolin Leonhardt; Conny Waßmuth	1:33.530	(Hungary); Tímea Paksy; Dalma Benedek; Szilvia Szabó; Kinga Bóta	1:34.292	(Poland); Beata Mikołajczyk; Małgorzata Chojnacka; Aneta Konieczna; Małgorzata Czajczyńska	1:34.730
K1-1000m	(Germany) Katrin Wagner-Augustin	3:58.646	(Sweden) Sofia Paldanius	3:59.336	(Czech Republic) Michaela Strnadová	3:59.858
K2-1000m	(Hungary); Nataša Janić; Katalin Kovács	3:36.171	(Denmark); Mette Barfod; Anne Lolk Thomsen	3:37.131	(Germany); Maike Nollen; Nadine Opgen-Rhein	3:37.305
K4-1000m	(Poland); Beata Mikołajczyk; Iwona Pyzalska; Aneta Białkowska; Edyta Dzieniszewska	3:15.129	(Germany); Maren Knebel; Birgit Fischer; Judith Hörmann; Carolin Leonhardt	3:15.717	(Romania); Florica Vulpeş; Lidia Talpă; Mariana Ciobanu; Alina Platon	3:17.313

=== Medal table ===
Rank	Nation	Gold	Silver	Bronze	Total
1	Germany	10	5	7	22
2	Hungary	6	7	2	15
3	Poland	2	5	5	12
4	Russia	2	3	1	6
5	Romania	2	1	3	6
6	Slovakia	1	2	0	3
7	Czech Republic	1	1	1	3
8	Belarus	1	0	1	2
9	Norway	1	0	0	1
9	Spain	1	0	0	1
11	Sweden	0	1	1	2
12	Denmark	0	1	0	1
12	Ukraine	0	1	0	1
14	Finland	0	0	2	2
15	Croatia	0	0	1	1
15	France	0	0	1	1
15	Portugal	0	0	1	1
15	Yugoslavia	0	0	1	1
Totals (18 entries)		27	27	27	81
