= 2002 Canoe Sprint European Championships =

International canoeing and kayaking event

The 2002 Canoe Sprint European Championships were held in Szeged, Hungary.

== Medal overview ==
=== Men ===
Event	Gold	Time	Silver	Time	Bronze	Time
C1-200m	(Russia) Maksim Opalev	39.904	(Poland) Andrzej Jezierski	40.748	(Hungary) Sándor Malomsoki	40.988
C2-200m	(Hungary); Miklós Buzál; Attila Végh	36.899	(Czech Republic); Petr Netušil; Petr Fuksa	36.971	(Romania); Ionel Averian; Mikhail Vartolemei	37.011
C4-200m	(Russia); Sergey Ulegin; Maksim Opalev; Roman Kruglyakov; Alexander Kostoglod	33.854	(Hungary); György Kolonics; Sándor Malomsoki; Gábor Ivan; László Vasali	33.866	(Czech Republic); Petr Procházka; Petr Fuksa; Jan Břečka; Karel Kožíšek	34.322
K1-200m	(Germany) Ronald Rauhe	35.201	(Hungary) Vince Fehérvári	35.441	(Lithuania) Romas Petrukanecas	35.621
K2-200m	(Hungary); Róbert Hegedűs; Vince Fehérvári	32.382	(Germany); Tim Wieskötter; Ronald Rauhe	32.546	(Poland); Adam Wysocki; Marek Twardowski	32.554
K4-200m	(Slovakia); Rastislav Kužel; Ladislav Belovič; Martin Chorváth; Juraj Lipták	30.414	(Spain); Manuel Muñoz Arestoy; Jaime Acuna Iglesias; Aike González Comesaña; Oier Aranzadi Aizpurua	30.482	(Hungary); István Beé; Gábor Horváth; Vince Fehérvári; Róbert Hegedűs	30.518
C1-500m	(Russia) Maksim Opalev	1:45.614	(Germany) Andreas Dittmer	1:46.826	(Czech Republic) Martin Doktor	1:48.038
C2-500m	(Russia); Sergey Ulegin; Alexander Kostoglod	1:38.502	(Romania); Silviu Simioncencu; Florin Popescu	1:39.650	(Germany); Tomasz Wylenzek; Christian Gille	1:40.866
C4-500m	(Hungary); Gábor Ivan; Sándor Malomsoki; György Kozmann; Béla Belicza	1:29.956	(Russia); Alexei Volkonski; Konstantin Fomichev; Aleksandr Artemida; Roman Kruglyakov	1:30.424	(Romania); Mikhail Vartolemei; Samil Grigore; Ionel Averian; Iosif Anisim	1:30.640
K1-500m	(Hungary) Ákos Vereckei	1:36.868	(Bulgaria) Petar Merkov	1:36.924	(Spain) Jovino González	1:37.440
K2-500m	(Germany); Tim Wieskötter; Ronald Rauhe	1:26.971	(Hungary); Botond Storcz; Zoltán Kammerer	1:27.047	(Sweden); Markus Oscarsson; Henrik Nilsson	1:27.263
K4-500m	(Slovakia); Juraj Bača; Erik Vlček; Michal Riszdorfer; Richard Riszdorfer	1:19.650	(Hungary); Róbert Hegedűs; Zsombor Borhi; Lajos Gyökös; Roland Kökény	1:20.278	(Italy); Andrea Facchin; Luca Piemonte; Franco Benedini; Antonio Rossi	1:20.350
C1-1000m	(Germany) Andreas Dittmer	3:58.103	(Russia) Maksim Opalev	3:58.979	(Bulgaria) Stanimir Atanasov	4:00.893
C2-1000m	(Romania); Florin Popescu; Silviu Simioncencu	3:38.607	(Poland); Marcin Kobierski; Michał Śliwiński	3:38.727	(Russia); Alexander Kostoglod; Sergey Ulegin	3:38.859
C4-1000m	(Hungary); Béla Belicza; György Kozmann; Ferenc Novák; Gábor Ivan	3:18.790	(Romania); Ionel Averian; Samil Grigore; Iosif Anisim; Mitică Pricop	3:20.146	(Russia); Alexei Volkonski; Dmitri Sergeev; Konstantin Fomichev; Roman Kruglyakov	3:20.674
K1-1000m	(United Kingdom) Tim Brabants	3:34.148	(Poland) Adam Seroczyński	3:34.226	(Germany) Lutz Liwowski	3:34.616
K2-1000m	(Sweden); Henrik Nilsson; Markus Oscarsson	3:11.931	(Slovakia); Róbert Erban; Juraj Kadnár	3:13.545	(Norway); Nils Olav Fjeldheim; Eirik Verås Larsen	3:13.665
K4-1000m	(Slovakia); Juraj Bača; Richard Riszdorfer; Michal Riszdorfer; Erik Vlček	2:51.446	(Hungary); Botond Storcz; Roland Kökény; Gábor Horváth; Zoltán Kammerer	2:52.748	(Bulgaria); Milko Kazanov; Ivan Hristov; Petar Merkov; Yordan Yordanov	2:52.754

=== Women ===
Event	Gold	Time	Silver	Time	Bronze	Time
K1-200m	(Spain) Teresa Portela Rivas	40.319	(Poland) Aneta Pastuszka	40.563	(United Kingdom) Rachel Train	41.227
K2-200m	(Spain); Sonia Molanes Costa; Beatriz Manchón	37.145	(Poland); Joanna Skowroń; Aneta Pastuszka	37.529	(Russia); Galina Poryvaeva; Natalya Gouilly	37.637
K4-200m	(Spain); Sonia Molanes Costa; Beatriz Manchón; Teresa Portela Rivas; María Isabel García	34.317	(Hungary); Nataša Janić; Kinga Bóta; Szilvia Szabó; Tímea Paksy	34.521	(Russia); Galina Poryvaeva; Marina Iatsun; Natalya Gouilly; Olga Tishchenko	35.165
K1-500m	(Hungary) Katalin Kovács	1:47.343	(Italy) Josefa Idem	1:48.703	(Poland) Elżbieta Urbańczyk	1:49.963
K2-500m	(Poland); Joanna Skowroń; Aneta Pastuszka	1:37.987	(Hungary); Kinga Bóta; Szilvia Szabó	1:39.087	(Spain); Beatriz Manchón; Sonia Molanes Costa	1:39.795
K4-500m	(Hungary); Kinga Bóta; Katalin Kovács; Szilvia Szabó; Erzsébet Viski	1:30.765	(Spain); Teresa Portela Rivas; Sonia Molanes Costa; Beatriz Manchón; María Isabel García	1:32.049	(Poland); Aneta Białkowska; Aneta Pastuszka; Joanna Skowroń; Karolina Sadalska	1:33.077
K1-1000m	(Hungary) Katalin Kovács	3:55.298	(Italy) Josefa Idem	3:57.842	(Germany) Katrin Wagner	3:59.432
K2-1000m	(Hungary); Kinga Bóta; Szilvia Szabó	3:38.283	(Poland); Aneta Białkowska; Joanna Skowroń	3:39.968	(Germany); Manuela Mucke; Nadine Opgen-Rhein	3:40.172
K4-1000m	(Hungary); Katalin Móni; Tímea Paksy; Alexandra Keresztesi; Erzsébet Viski	3:21.280	(Romania); Florica Vulpeş; Alina Ciurescu; Mariana Ciobanu; Lidia Rusănescu	3:23.674	(Poland); Karolina Sadalska; Dorota Kuczkowska; Iwona Pyżalska; Małgorzata Czajczyńska	3:26.500

=== Medal table ===
Rank	Nation	Gold	Silver	Bronze	Total
1	Hungary	10	7	2	19
2	Russia	4	2	4	10
3	Germany	3	2	4	9
4	Spain	3	2	2	7
5	Slovakia	3	1	0	4
6	Poland	1	6	4	11
7	Romania	1	3	2	6
8	Great Britain	1	0	1	2
8	Sweden	1	0	1	2
10	Italy	0	2	1	3
11	Bulgaria	0	1	2	3
11	Czech Republic	0	1	2	3
13	Lithuania	0	0	1	1
13	Norway	0	0	1	1
Totals (14 entries)		27	27	27	81
