= 2004 Canoe Sprint European Championships =

International canoeing and kayaking event

The 2004 Canoe Sprint European Championships were held in Poznań, Poland.

== Medal overview ==
=== Men ===
Event	Gold	Time	Silver	Time	Bronze	Time
C1-200m	(Russia) Maksim Opalev	40.008	(Germany) Andreas Dittmer	41.028	(Czech Republic) Martin Doktor	41.070
C2-200m	(Czech Republic); Petr Netušil; Petr Fuksa	38.993	(Hungary); Attila Bozsik; Gergely Kovács	39.101	(Poland); Paweł Baraszkiewicz; Daniel Jędraszko	39.107
C4-200m	(Czech Republic); Petr Fuksa; Petr Netušil; Jan Břečka; Karel Kožíšek	35.254	(Russia); Roman Kruglyakov; Evgeny Ignatov; Dmitri Sergeev; Alexei Volkonski	35.674	(Hungary); László Vasali; Sándor Malomsoki; Béla Belicza; Gergely Kovács	35.710
K1-200m	(Germany) Ronald Rauhe	36.099	(Lithuania) Alvydas Duonėla	36.195	(Poland) Tomasz Mendelski	36.897
K2-200m	(Lithuania); Egidijus Balčiūnas; Alvydas Duonėla	33.626	(Russia); Sergey Khovanskiy; Stepan Shevchuk	34.166	(Hungary); Gergely Gyertyános; Balázs Babella	34.328
K4-200m	(Hungary); Viktor Kadler; István Beé; Balázs Babella; Gergely Boros	31.414	(Spain); Manuel Muñoz Arestoy; Jaime Acuna Iglesias; Oier Aranzadi Aizpurua; Aique Gonzales Comesana	31.726	(Russia); Roman Zarubin; Alexander Ivanik; Anatoli Golikov; Oleg Chertov	32.002
C1-500m	(Russia) Maksim Opalev	1:52.442	(Germany) Andreas Dittmer	1:53.258	(Spain) David Cal Figueroa	1:53.354
C2-500m	(Hungary); György Kozmann; György Kolonics	1:43.371	(Poland); Paweł Baraszkiewicz; Daniel Jędraszko	1:44.073	(Romania); Silviu Simioncencu; Florin Popescu	1:44.415
C4-500m	(Romania); Florin Popescu; Iosif Anisim; Silviu Simioncencu; Petre Condrat	1:36.106	(Russia); Alexei Volkonski; Roman Kruglyakov; Dmitri Sergeev; Evgeny Ignatov	1:36.796	(Belarus); Aliaksandr Bahdanovich; Aliaksandr Kurliandchyk; Aliaksandr Zhukouski; Sermen Saponenko	1:37.012
K1-500m	(Hungary) Ákos Vereckei	1:41.380	(United Kingdom) Ian Wynne	1:41.884	(Spain) Carlos Pérez Rial	1:41.974
K2-500m	(Germany); Tim Wieskötter; Ronald Rauhe	1:31.268	(Lithuania); Egidijus Balčiūnas; Alvydas Duonėla	1:31.886	(Russia); Anatoly Tishchenko; Vladimir Grushikhin	1:32.864
K4-500m	(Hungary); Zoltán Benkő; István Beé; Roland Kökény; Gábor Kucsera	1:23.732	(Belarus); Aliaksei Abalmasau; Dziamyan Turchyn; Raman Piatrushenka; Vadzim Makhneu	1:24.092	(Russia); Andrei Tissin; Oleg Chertov; Stepan Shevchuk; Sergey Khovanskiy	1:25.526
C1-1000m	(Germany) Andreas Dittmer	3:53.821	(Spain) David Cal Figueroa	3:55.471	(Czech Republic) Martin Doktor	3:55.495
C2-1000m	(Poland); Michał Śliwiński; Łukasz Woszczyński	3:34.239	(Russia); Alexander Kovalev; Alexander Kostoglod	3:35.277	(Germany); Stefan Utess; Thomas Lück	3:35.805
C4-1000m	(Hungary); Csaba Hüttner; Gábor Furdok; Imre Pulai; Ferenc Novák	3:19.595	(Romania); Iosif Chirilă; Andrei Cuculici; Petre Condrat; Mitică Pricop	3:20.771	(Belarus); Aliaksandr Kurliandchyk; Aliaksandr Bahdanovich; Sermen Saponenko; Aliaksandr Zhukouski	3:20.843
K1-1000m	(Norway) Eirik Verås Larsen	3:30.532	(United Kingdom) Tim Brabants	3:32.542	(Spain) Jovino Gonzalez Comesana	3:32.980
K2-1000m	(Norway); Eirik Verås Larsen; Nils Olav Fjeldheim	3:11.521	(Spain); Pablo Banos; Javier Hernanz Agueria	3:12.655	(United Kingdom); Paul Darby-Dowman; Ian Wynne	3:13.321
K4-1000m	(Hungary); Botond Storcz; Ákos Vereckei; Gábor Horváth; Zoltán Kammerer	2:52.719	(Norway); Alexander Wefald; Mattis Næss; Jacob Norenberg; Andreas Gjersøe	2:55.282	(Poland); Tomasz Mendelski; Dariusz Białkowski; Rafał Głażewski; Paweł Baumann	2:56.481

=== Women ===
Event	Gold	Time	Silver	Time	Bronze	Time
K1-200m	(Spain) Teresa Portela Rivas	41.748	(Poland) Aneta Pastuszka	43.116	(Hungary) Tímea Paksy	43.290
K2-200m	(Spain); Teresa Portela Rivas; Beatriz Manchón	39.175	(Hungary); Melinda Patyi; Tímea Paksy	39.433	(Germany); Birgit Fischer; Carolin Leonhardt	39.985
K4-200m	(Spain); Jana Smidakova; María Isabel García; Teresa Portela Rivas; Beatriz Manchón	35.170	(Hungary); Kinga Bóta; Erzsébet Viski; Szilvia Szabó; Katalin Kovács	35.596	(Russia); Tatiana Andreeva; Galina Poryvaeva; Tatyana Tishchenko; Svetlana Kudinova	37.030
K1-500m	(Hungary) Nataša Janić	1:54.099	(Belgium) Petra Santy	1:55.107	(Germany) Maike Nollen	1:56.181
K2-500m	(Hungary); Dalma Benedek; Tímea Paksy	1:44.926	(Germany); Carolin Leonhardt; Birgit Fischer	1:45.790	(Spain); Beatriz Manchón; Teresa Portela Rivas	1:45.870
K4-500m	(Ukraine); Tetyana Semykina; Hanna Balabanova; Olena Cherevatova; Inna Osypenko	1:33.542	(Hungary); Kinga Bóta; Erzsébet Viski; Szilvia Szabó; Katalin Kovács	1:33.620	(Spain); Teresa Portela Rivas; Beatriz Manchón; María Isabel García; Jana Smidakova	1:35.276
K1-1000m	(Hungary) Katalin Kovács	3:55.095	(Poland) Beata Mikołajczyk	3:55.460	(Norway) Ellen Fevang	4:04.503
K2-1000m	(Hungary); Kinga Bóta; Szilvia Szabó	3:38.842	(Poland); Iwona Pyżalska; Dorota Kuczkowska	3:41.188	(Bulgaria); Bonka Pindzheva; Delyana Dacheva	3:44.788
K4-1000m	(Romania); Lidia Talpă; Florica Vulpeş; Mariana Ciobanu; Alina Ciurescu	3:23.363	(Russia); Svetlana Kudinova; Tatyana Tishchenko; Anastasia Sergeeva; Tatiana Andreeva	3:24.845	(Hungary); Kinga Dékány; Berenike Faldum; Katalin Móni; Linda Benedek	3:26.993

=== Medal table ===
Rank	Nation	Gold	Silver	Bronze	Total
1	Hungary	10	4	4	18
2	Spain	3	3	5	11
3	Germany	3	3	3	9
4	Russia	2	5	4	11
5	Norway	2	1	1	4
5	Romania	2	1	1	4
7	Czech Republic	2	0	2	4
8	Poland	1	4	3	8
9	Lithuania	1	2	0	3
10	Ukraine	1	0	0	1
11	Great Britain	0	2	1	3
12	Belarus	0	1	2	3
13	Belgium	0	1	0	1
14	Bulgaria	0	0	1	1
Totals (14 entries)		27	27	27	81
