= Michał Śliwiński =

Polish canoeist

Medal record

Men's canoe sprint

Olympic Games

Representing Soviet Union
| Silver medal – second place | 1988 Seoul | C-1 500 m |

Representing Unified Team
| Silver medal – second place | 1992 Barcelona | C-1 500 m |

World Championships

Representing Soviet Union
| Gold medal – first place | 1989 Plovdiv | C-1 500 m |
| Gold medal – first place | 1990 Poznań | C-1 500 m |
| Gold medal – first place | 1991 Paris | C-1 500 m |

Representing Poland
| Gold medal – first place | 2001 Poznań | C-2 1000 m |
| Gold medal – first place | 2002 Seville | C-2 1000 m |
| Gold medal – first place | 2005 Zagreb | C-4 1000 m |
| Silver medal – second place | 2003 Gainesville | C-4 500 m |

Representing Ukraine
| Bronze medal – third place | 1994 Mexico City | C-1 200 m |
| Bronze medal – third place | 1994 Mexico City | C-1 500 m |
| Bronze medal – third place | 1994 Mexico City | K-4 200 m |
| Bronze medal – third place | 1995 Duisburg | C-1 200 m |
| Bronze medal – third place | 1997 Dartmouth | C-1 200 m |
| Bronze medal – third place | 1997 Dartmouth | C-1 500 m |
| Bronze medal – third place | 1998 Szeged | C-1 200 m |
| Bronze medal – third place | 1998 Szeged | C-1 500 m |

Representing Poland
| Bronze medal – third place | 2001 Poznań | C-1 200 m |
| Bronze medal – third place | 2002 Seville | C-4 500 m |
| Bronze medal – third place | 2005 Zagreb | C-4 500 m |

European Championships
| Gold medal – first place | 2004 Poznań | C2-1000 m |
| Silver medal – second place | 2002 Szeged | C2-1000 m |
| Silver medal – second place | 2005 Poznań | C2-500 m |

Michał Śliwiński (Mykhaylo Slyvynsky Ukrainian: Михайло Сливинський; born February 5, 1970, in Dobrotvir, Ukrainian SSR) is a Soviet/Ukrainian/Polish sprint canoer, who has won six world championship titles over his long career.

An ethnic Pole from Ukraine, Śliwiński represented the USSR at the 1988 Olympics, winning the Canadian canoe C-1 500 m silver medal at the age of only eighteen.

Over the next three years he dominated the event, winning consecutive world championship gold medals in 1989, 1990 and 1991. However, in the 1992 Olympics he had to settle for another silver medal behind Nikolay Bukhalov of Bulgaria.

The break-up of the Soviet Union affected Śliwiński's career greatly as the newly independent Ukraine did not win any world championship gold medals during the 1990s. Śliwiński, now specialising in the short sprint 200 m races, was still regarded as a top competitor at international events but he endured a frustrating sequence of four world championship bronze medals. With no 200 m races included in the Olympics he competed in the C-1 500 m at Atlanta 1996, finishing just outside the medals in fourth place.

In 2001 he accepted an invitation to switch to representing Poland, a decision which dramatically revived his career. Although in his thirties he went on to win three more world titles. With partner Marcin Kobierski he became C-2 1000 m champion in 2001 in Poznań, Poland. In 2002 they retained their crown in Seville.

Śliwiński's build-up to the Athens Olympics was beset with problems, not of his own making. In 2003 his partner Kobierski tested positive in a drugs test as did his most obvious left-handed replacement Michał Gajownik. Both were given two-year bans, ruling them out of the Olympics.

After much debate young hopeful Łukasz Woszczyński was chosen to partner Śliwiński. At their first major competition together they finished in fourth place at the 2003 World Championships in Gainesville, Georgia, United States (where the 1996 Olympic canoeing events took place on Lake Lanier.). In 2004 they became C-2 1000 m European champions in front of their home crowd in Poznań. At the Athens Olympics they finished seventh in the C-2 1000 m final, the exhausted Woszczynski collapsing at the end of the race.

The partnership was retained for the 2005 season. They took the C-2 500 m silver medal at the European championships in July but Woszczynski was then injured and unable to take part in the World Championships in Zagreb. It seemed as if Śliwiński would be left without a boat. However, when a member of Poland's four-man (C-4) 1000 m crew, Arkadiusz Tonski, also had to pull out injured, Śliwiński was called up as a last-minute replacement. The Polish four, ironically including the now rehabitated Gajownik, edged out the Romanian crew to take the gold medal. For the thirty-five-year-old Śliwiński it was the first C-4 gold of his long career.

Śliwiński is a member of the Spojnia Warsaw club. He is 177 cm (5 ft 10 in) tall and weighs 89 kg (196 lb).
