= Gafni =

Gafni is a surname. Notable people with the surname include:

- Adi Gafni, Israeli sprint canoer
- Isaiah Gafni (born 1944), Israeli historian
- Marc Gafni (born 1960), American spiritual writer
- Moshe Gafni (born 1952), Israeli politician

== See also ==
- Gani
