= Arnd Goldschmidt =

German canoeist

Medal record

Men's canoe sprint

World Championships
Gold medal – first place	2005 Zagreb	K-4 1000 m

Arnd Goldschmidt (born 9 June 1981 in Karlsruhe), is a German flatwater canoer and former world champion.

A junior world champion in 1999 with Germany's K-4 1000 m crew, Goldschmidt was called up to the senior K-4 200 m boat which reached the world championship final in Seville, Spain, in 2002. However, he had to wait until the 2004 retirement of Olympic medalists Stefan Ulm and Mark Zabel to get his chance in Germany's flagship K-4 1000 m crew.

His patience was rewarded with a gold medal at the 2005 ICF Canoe Sprint World Championships in Zagreb, Croatia.

In 2006, a surprising failure in the German test event meant he was unable to defend his world title.

His elder brother Björn is also a German international. Both are members of the Rheinbrüder Karlsruhe club.
