= Wojciech Tyszyński =

Polish canoeist (born 1984)

Medal record

Men's canoe sprint
| Event | 1st | 2nd | 3rd |
|---|---|---|---|
| Olympic Games | 0 | 0 | 0 |
| World Championships | 1 | 0 | 2 |
| European Championships | 0 | 1 | 1 |
| European Games | 0 | 0 | 0 |
| Total | 1 | 1 | 3 |

World Championships
| Gold medal – first place | 2005 Zagreb | C-4 1000 m |
| Bronze medal – third place | 2003 Gainesville | C-4 1000 m |
| Bronze medal – third place | 2007 Duisburg | C-2 1000 m |

European Championships
| Silver medal – second place | 2005 Poznań | C4-1000 m |
| Bronze medal – third place | 2008 Milan | C2-1000 m |

Wojciech Tyszyński (born December 12, 1984, in Sztum) is a Polish sprint canoeist who has competed since 2003. He won three medals at the ICF Canoe Sprint World Championships, including a gold (C-4 1000 m: 2005) and two bronzes (C-2 1000 m: 2007, C-4 1000 m: 2003).

Tyszyński also finished seventh in the C-2 1000 m event at the 2008 Summer Olympics in Beijing.
