= Nathan Baggaley =

Australian sprint canoeist and surfskier

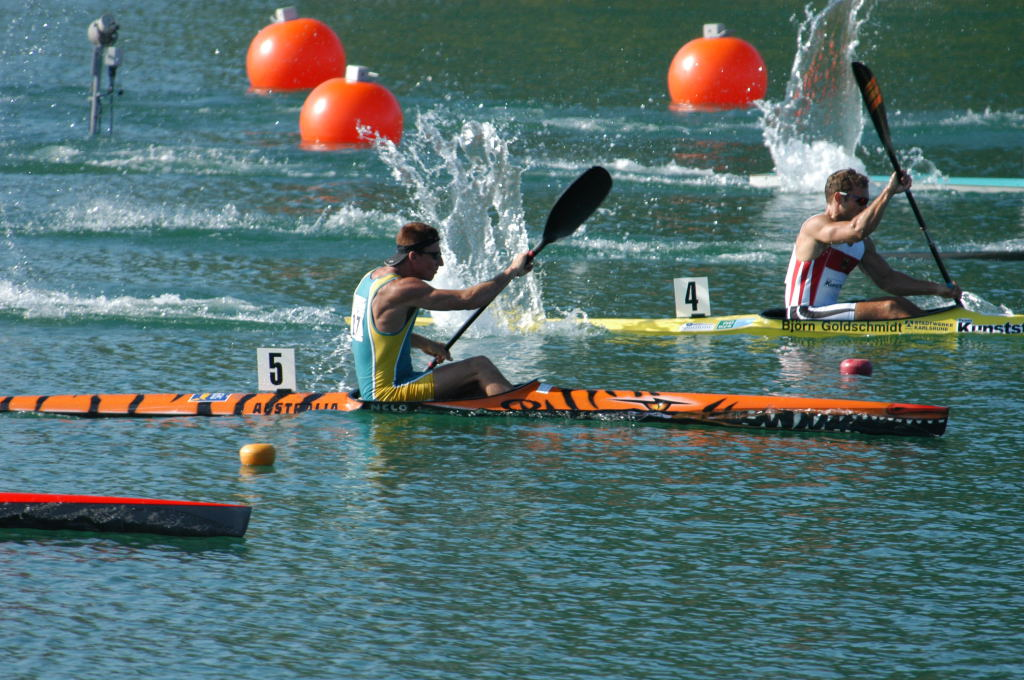
- Baggeley (#5) in action at the 2005 World Championships in Zagreb, Croatia

Personal information
- Born: 6 December 1975 (age 50) Byron Bay, New South Wales
Medal record
Men's canoe sprint
Olympic Games
Silver medal – second place	2004 Athens	K-1 500 m
Silver medal – second place	2004 Athens	K-2 500 m
World Championships
Gold medal – first place	2002 Seville	K-1 500 m
Gold medal – first place	2003 Gainesville	K-1 500 m
Gold medal – first place	2005 Zagreb	K-1 500 m
Bronze medal – third place	2003 Gainesville	K-1 1000 m
Bronze medal – third place	2005 Zagreb	K-1 1000 m

Nathan Baggaley (born 6 December 1975 in Byron Bay, New South Wales) is an Australian sprint canoeist and surfski champion. He is a three-time world champion in the K-1 500 m events and has also won two Olympic silver medals. His career has been tarnished by drug scandals and arrests.

== Career summary ==
Baggaley made his international debut for Australia in 1997, initially competing in the K-2. In 1999 he switched to the K-1 and reached the K-1 500 m semifinals at Sydney in 2000. He became one of the top stars in the sport, winning three consecutive K-1 500 m world championships (2002, 2003, 2005). At the Athens Olympics Baggaley won the silver medal in the K-1 500 m, edged out by Canadian Adam van Koeverden. In the K-2 race he partnered with Clint Robinson to another silver medal. He was voted the Australian Institute of Sport's Athlete of the Year in 2004. Baggeley returned to win in the K-1 500 m event at Zagreb in 2005 prior to being banned for 24 months for steroid use.

== Steroids and illicit drug ==
In September 2005 Baggaley tested positive for banned steroids (stanozolol and methandienone). Baggaley was subsequently banned for 15 months by Australian Canoeing. The suspension was extended to two years by the International Canoe Federation, with authorities saying they did not consider drinking his brother's steroid-laced orange juice to be an extenuating circumstance. Baggaley said that he had been drug-tested at least 50 times in his career and had always tested negative. At the time Baggaley announced he wanted to return to kayaking after serving his suspension, with the comment that after 10 years of competition "I could seriously do with the rest." However, the Australian Canoe Federation rejected a reinstatement application from Baggaley in October 2007 after his arrest with hundreds of ecstasy tablets earlier that same year.

In February 2007 police had stopped Baggaley and a companion in Mermaid Waters, Gold Coast, Queensland and on searching their car they found 762 ecstasy tablets, cannabis and cash. Baggaley was arrested again in November 2007 and jailed, facing more drug charges of manufacture and dealing ectasy. In February 2009, Baggaley pleaded guilty to manufacturing 1,509 tablets of the drug MDMA and to two counts of supplying a prohibited drug, and was due to be sentenced in March. His younger brother Dru, arrested with Nathan, pleaded guilty to manufacturing 13,500 tablets of MDMA and one count of supply. He was sentenced to nine years in jail with a non-parole period of five years.

Additionally in July 2007, Nathan Baggaley was arrested after allegedly stealing a surf ski from the Byron Bay Surf Club. He pleaded guilty to theft and was placed on a six-month good behaviour bond and ordered to pay $70 court costs.

In June 2010 Baggaley was charged with possession of a prescribed restricted substance, being steroids, in jail at the Cessnock Correctional Centre. He was subsequently moved to the Metropolitan Remand and Reception Centre. On 20 November 2011, Baggaley was released from the Grafton Correctional Centre, having served his custodial sentence.

In November 2013, Baggaley was arrested by Australian Federal Police and charged with various counts of conspiracy to import a commercial quantity of a border-controlled drug into Australia, conspiracy to manufacture and produce a prohibited drug (2C-B a psychedelic drug), the manufacture and production of a prohibited drug and one count of supplying a large commercial quantity of a prohibited drug. He was remanded in custody and officially refused bail. In February 2015 Baggaley pleaded guilty to "drug manufacturing and conspiracy charges". In December he was sentenced by Judge Leonie Flannery to a non-parole period of two years and three months.

In August 2018, Baggaley's brother, Dru Anthony Baggaley, was arrested in connection with the attempted importation of 600 kilograms (1,300 lb) of cocaine. On 20 June 2019, Nathan Baggaley was arrested at his home in Byron Bay in connection with the same alleged crime, after "an ongoing investigation and evidence collection over the past 11 months." After pleading not guilty, on 1 April 2021 Baggaley and his brother were found guilty. Baggaley was sentenced to 25 years on 27 July 2021.
