= Jaka Jazbec =

Italian canoeist

Medal record

Men's canoe sprint

World Championships
Bronze medal – third place	2005 Zagreb	K-4 500 m

Jaka Jazbec is an Italian sprint canoer who has competed since the mid-2000s. He won a bronze medal in the K-4 500 m at the 2005 ICF Canoe Sprint World Championships in Zagreb.
