= Marek Twardowski =

Polish sprint canoeist

Medal record
Event	1st	2nd	3rd
Olympic Games	0	0	0
World Championships	3	9	4
European Championships	2	3	7
European Games	0	0	0
Total	5	12	11

Men's canoe sprint

World Championships
Gold medal – first place	1999 Milan	K-2 500 m
Gold medal – first place	2006 Szeged	K-1 500 m
Gold medal – first place	2011 Szeged	K-1 500 m
Silver medal – second place	1999 Milan	K-2 1000 m
Silver medal – second place	1999 Milan	K-4 200 m
Silver medal – second place	2002 Seville	K-2 200 m
Silver medal – second place	2002 Seville	K-2 500 m
Silver medal – second place	2003 Gainesville	K-2 200 m
Silver medal – second place	2005 Zagreb	K-2 500 m
Silver medal – second place	2006 Szeged	K-2 200 m
Silver medal – second place	2006 Szeged	K-4 1000 m
Silver medal – second place	2007 Duisburg	K-4 1000 m
Bronze medal – third place	1999 Milan	K-2 200 m
Bronze medal – third place	2005 Zagreb	K-2 200 m
Bronze medal – third place	2005 Zagreb	K-4 1000 m
Bronze medal – third place	2007 Duisburg	K-1 500 m

European Championships
Gold medal – first place	1999 Zagreb	K2-200 m
Gold medal – first place	1999 Zagreb	K2-500 m
Silver medal – second place	2005 Poznań	K2-500 m
Silver medal – second place	2007 Pontevedra	K1-200 m
Silver medal – second place	2012 Zagreb	K-1 500 m
Bronze medal – third place	1999 Zagreb	K2-1000 m
Bronze medal – third place	2001 Milan	K2-200 m
Bronze medal – third place	2001 Milan	K2-500 m
Bronze medal – third place	2002 Szeged	K2-200m
Bronze medal – third place	2005 Poznań	K4-1000 m
Bronze medal – third place	2007 Pontevedra	K1-500 m
Bronze medal – third place	2007 Pontevedra	K4-1000 m

Marek Twardowski (born 6 October 1979 in Białystok) is a Polish sprint canoeist who has competed since the late 1990s. He won fifteen medals at the ICF Canoe Sprint World Championships with two golds (K-1 500 m: 2006, K-2 500 m: 1999), nine silvers (K-2 200 m: 2002, 2003, 2006; K-2 500 m: 2002, 2005; K-2 1000 m: 1999, K-4 200 m: 1999, K-4 1000 m: 2006, 2007), and four bronzes (K-1 500 m: 2007, K-2 200 m: 1999, 2005; K-4 1000 m: 2007).

Twardowski also competed in three Summer Olympics, earning his best finish of fourth in the K-2 500 m event at Athens in 2004.

Nicknamed Twardy, he is 1.82 m (6'0) tall and weighs 85 kg (187 lbs). Twardowski is a member of the Sparta Augustów club where he is coached by Andrzej Siemion.

On 9 July 2008 he was named the Polish national flag bearer for the 2008 Summer Olympics in Beijing.

Olympic Games
Preceded by Bartosz Kizierowski	Flagbearer for Poland; 2008 Beijing	Succeeded by Agnieszka Radwańska
