= Paweł Baumann =

Polish canoeist

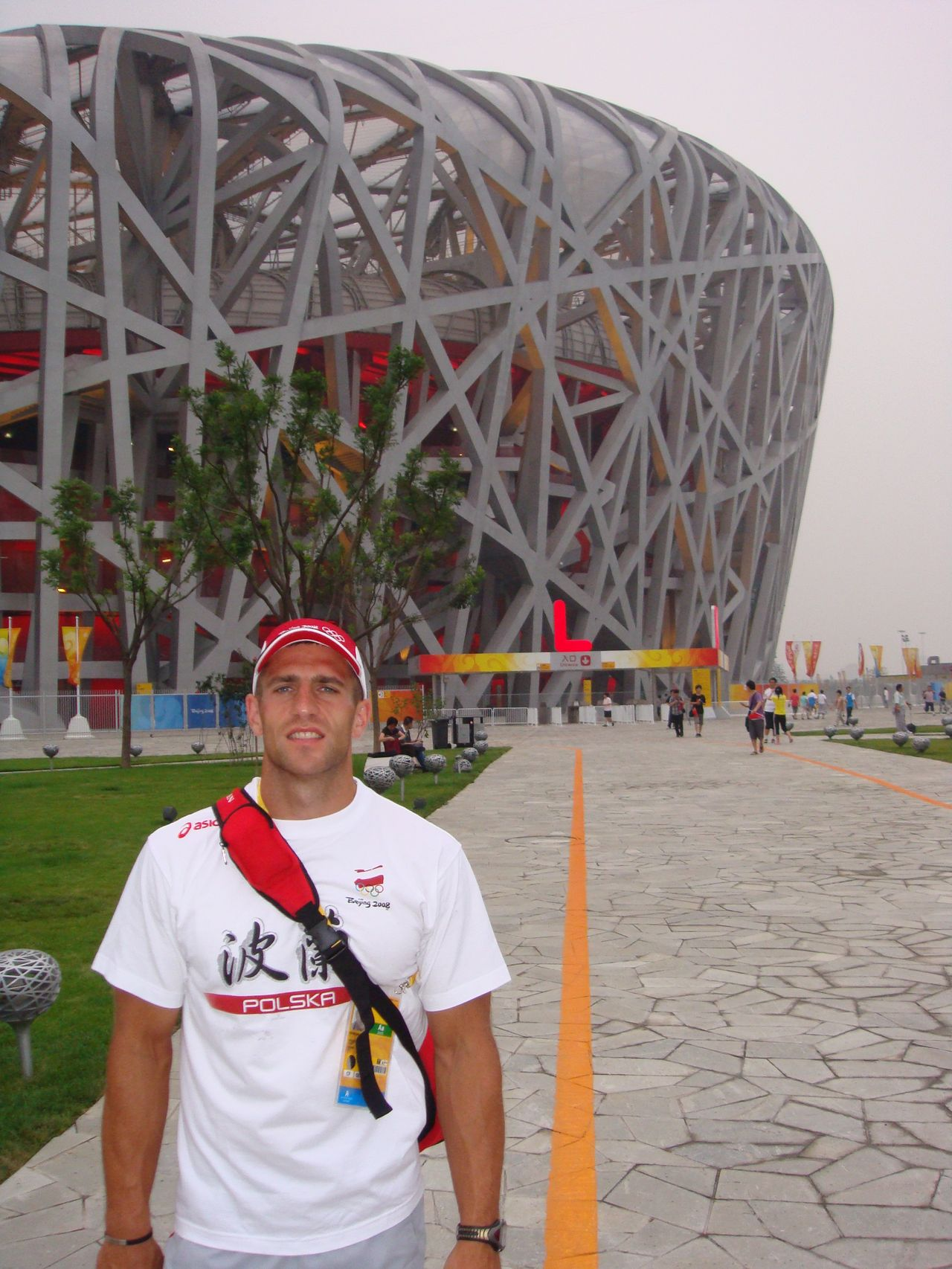
- Paweł Baumann

Medal record

Representing Poland

Men's canoe sprint
Event	1st	2nd	3rd
Olympic Games	0	0	0
World Championships	0	2	2
European Championships	0	0	1
European Games	0	0	0
Total	0	2	4

World Championships
Silver medal – second place	2006 Szeged	K-4 1000 m
Silver medal – second place	2007 Duisburg	K-4 1000 m
Bronze medal – third place	2005 Zagreb	K-4 1000 m
Bronze medal – third place	2006 Szeged	K-4 500 m

European Championships
Bronze medal – third place	2004 Poznań	K4-1000 m
Bronze medal – third place	2005 Poznań	K4-1000 m

Paweł Baumann (11 June 1983 – 21 October 2016) was a Polish sprint canoer, born in Poznań, who competed since the early 2000s until his death. He won four medals at the ICF Canoe Sprint World Championships with two silvers (K-4 1000 m: 2006, 2007), and a bronze (K-4 500 m: 2006, K-4 1000 m: 2005).

Baumann also competed in two Summer Olympics, earning his best finish of sixth in the K-4 1000 m event at Beijing in 2008.

Baumann died on 21 October 2016 at a construction site where he worked. He was 33.
