= Adam Wysocki =

Polish sprint canoeist (born 1974)

Medal record

Men's canoe sprint

Representing Poland
| Event | 1st | 2nd | 3rd |
|---|---|---|---|
| Olympic Games | 0 | 0 | 0 |
| World Championships | 2 | 10 | 5 |
| European Championships | 2 | 2 | 9 |
| European Games | 1 | 0 | 0 |
| Total | 4 | 12 | 14 |

World Championships
| Gold medal – first place | 1994 Mexico City | K-2 200 m |
| Gold medal – first place | 1999 Milan | K-2 500 m |
| Silver medal – second place | 1994 Mexico City | K-4 1000 m |
| Silver medal – second place | 1999 Milan | K-2 1000 m |
| Silver medal – second place | 1999 Milan | K-4 200 m |
| Silver medal – second place | 2002 Seville | K-2 200 m |
| Silver medal – second place | 2002 Seville | K-2 500 m |
| Silver medal – second place | 2003 Gainesville | K-2 200 m |
| Silver medal – second place | 2005 Zagreb | K-2 500 m |
| Silver medal – second place | 2006 Szeged | K-2 200 m |
| Silver medal – second place | 2006 Szeged | K-4 1000 m |
| Silver medal – second place | 2007 Duisburg | K-4 1000 m |
| Bronze medal – third place | 1995 Duisburg | K-2 500 m |
| Bronze medal – third place | 1999 Milan | K-2 200 m |
| Bronze medal – third place | 2005 Zagreb | K-2 200 m |
| Bronze medal – third place | 2005 Zagreb | K-4 1000 m |
| Bronze medal – third place | 2006 Szeged | K-4 500 m |

European Championships
| Gold medal – first place | 1999 Zagreb | K2-200 m |
| Gold medal – first place | 1999 Zagreb | K2-500 m |
| Silver medal – second place | 1997 Plovdiv | K2-500 m |
| Silver medal – second place | 2005 Poznań | K2-500 m |
| Bronze medal – third place | 1997 Plovdiv | K2-200 m |
| Bronze medal – third place | 1997 Plovdiv | K4-200 m |
| Bronze medal – third place | 1999 Zagreb | K2-1000 m |
| Bronze medal – third place | 2001 Milan | K2-200 m |
| Bronze medal – third place | 2001 Milan | K2-500 m |
| Bronze medal – third place | 2002 Szeged | K2-200 m |
| Bronze medal – third place | 2005 Poznań | K4-1000 m |
| Bronze medal – third place | 2007 Pontevedra | K2-500 m |
| Bronze medal – third place | 2007 Pontevedra | K4-1000 m |

Adam Wysocki (born 27 December 1974 in Augustów) is a Polish sprint canoeist who competed from 1994 to 2008. He has won eighteen medals at the ICF Canoe Sprint World Championships with two golds (K-2 200 m: 1994, K-2 500 m: 1999), ten silvers (K-2 200 m: 2002, 2003, 2006; K-2 500 m: 2002, 2005; K-2 1000 m: 1999, K-4 200 m: 1994, K-4 1000 m: 1994, 2006, 2007), and five bronzes (K-2 200 m: 1999, 2005; K-2 500 m: 1995, K-4 500 m: 2006, K-4 1000 m: 2005).

== Biography ==
Wysocki also competed in four Summer Olympics, earning his best finish of fourth twice (K-2 500 m: 2004, K-4 1000 m: 1996).

Standing 186 cm tall (6'1) and weighs 88 kg (194 lbs), Wysocki is studying in Kraków to become a coach when he retires. Wysocki has also won prizes in poetry competitions.
