= Andrzej Jezierski =

Polish and Irish sprint canoeist

Medal record

Men's canoe sprint
Event	1st	2nd	3rd
Olympic Games	0	0	0
World Championships	2	1	2
European Championships	0	3	2
European Games	0	0	0
Total	2	4	1

World Championships
Gold medal – first place	2002 Seville	C-4 1000 m
Gold medal – first place	2005 Zagreb	C-4 1000 m
Silver medal – second place	2002 Seville	C-1 200 m
Bronze medal – third place	2003 Gainesville	C-4 1000 m
Bronze medal – third place	2005 Zagreb	C-4 500 m

European Championships
Silver medal – second place	2002 Szeged	C1-200 m
Silver medal – second place	2005 Poznań	C4-500m
Silver medal – second place	2005 Poznań	C4-1000 m
Bronze medal – third place	2001 Milan	C4-200 m
Bronze medal – third place	2001 Milan	C4-1000 m

Andrzej Jezierski (born 29 July 1980) is a Polish and Irish sprint canoeist. He won five medals representing Poland at the ICF Canoe Sprint World Championships with two golds (C-4 1000 m: 2002, 2005), one silver (C-1 200 m: 2002), and two bronzes (C-4 500 m: 2005, C-4 1000 m: 2003).

He represented Ireland in the 2012 Olympic Games, in C-1 200m.

Jezierski finished 1st in the B final to claim 9th place overall.

== World championships ==
He was the world champion in C-4 1000 in 2002 (together with Roman Rynkiewicz, Michał Gajownik and Adam Ginter) and in 2005 (together with Michał Śliwiński, Michał Gajownik and Wojciech Tyszyński).

He was also the silver medalist in C-1 200 m in 2002, in C-4 1000 a bronze medalist in 2003 (together with Adam Ginter, Roman Rynkiewicz and Wojciech Tyszyński) and a bronze medalist in the C-4 500 m in 2005 (together with Adam Ginter, Michał Gajownik and Wojciech Tyszyński).

On top of that he also took part in the world championships in 1999 (C-4 500 m - 5th place., C-4 1000 m - 7th place./ C-4 200 m - 9th place .), 2001 (C-4 500 m - 6th place,. C-4 1000 m - 6th place,), 2003 in C-4 200 m (5th place.) and in C-1 200 m (8th place.) and in 2005 in C-4 200m (7th place.)

== European Championships ==
He was a three-time silver medalist at European level: in C-1 200m in 2002, C-4 500m in 2005 (together with Roman Rynkiewicz, Michał Gajownik and Adam Ginter.) and C-4 1000m in 2005 (together with Michał Gajownik, Arkadiusz Toński and Wojciech Tyszyński) and also a two-time bronze medalist in the European championships in 2001 in the C-4 1000m (together with Roman Rynkiewicz, Michał GajownikandAdam Ginter) and in 2002 in the C-4 200 m with Roman Rynkiewicz, Michał Gajownik and Adam Ginter)

He also took part in the European championships in 1999 (C-4 500 m - 6th place., C-4 200 m - 7th place./ C-1 1000 m - 87th place .), 2000 (C-4 500 m - 4th place,. C-4 200 m - 5th place. C-4 1000M - 7th place,), 2001 in C-2 500 m (5th place.), 2002 in C-2 500 m (4th place.), 2004 (C-1 200 m - 4th place., C-1 500 m - 9th place.) and in 2005 in C-2 200 m (5th place.)

== Olympic Games ==
He represented Ireland at the 2012 Olympic Games, in the C-1 200m. Jezierski finished 1st in the B final to claim 9th place overall.

== Poland Championships ==
Andrzej Jezierski has been champion of Poland twenty times.

C-1 200 m - 2002, 2003, 2004, 2012 C-4 200 m - 2002 (with Michał Gajownik, Daniel Jędraszka and Paweł Baraszkiewicz), 2003 (with Daniel Jędraszka, Paweł Baraszkiewicz and Grzegorz Pachowicz) 2004 (with Michał Gajownik, Daniel Jędraszka and Pawł Baraszkiewicz), 2005 (z Michał Gajownik, Daniel Jędraszka and Paweł Baraszkiewicz) C-2 500 m - 1999 (with Sebastian Wróbel), 2005 (with Michał Gajowniki) C-4 500 m - 2002 (with Michał Gajownik, Daniel Jędraszka and Paweł Baraszkiewicz), 2005 (with Michał Gajownik, Daniel Jędraszka and Paweł Baraszkiewicz) C-2 1000 m - 1999 (with Sebastian Wróbel) C-4 1000 m - 2001 (with Michał Gajownik, Daniel Jędraszka and Paweł Baraszkiewicz), 2002 (with Michał Gajownik, Daniel Jędraszką and Paweł Baraszkiewicz), 2003 (withSzymon Cybal, Daniel Jędraszka and Pawł Baraszkiewicz), 2004 (with Michał Gajownik, Daniel Jędraszka and Paweł Baraszkiewicz), 2005 (with Michał Gajownik, Paweł Skowroński and Paweł Baraszkiewicz), 2012 (with Mariusz Kruk, Marcin Grzybowski and Szymon Kosteński C-1 4 × 200 m - 2012 (with Mariusz Kruk, Marcin Grzybowski and Piotr Polak

== Back to sport ==
In 2005 Andrzej Jezierski finished his sport career and moved to Ireland. In 2010 he started training again and thank to his double citizenship he achieved Olympic qualification for Ireland for the 2012 London Olympics.

In 2012 after a seven-year break, he also won another three Polish championships.
