= Petra Schlitzer =

Austrian canoeist (born 1975)

Medal record

Women's canoe sprint

World Championships
Silver medal – second place	2005 Zagreb	K-2 500 m

Petra Schlitzer (born 12 April 1975) is an Austrian sprint canoeist who competed in the mid-2000s. She won a silver medal in the K-2 500 m event at the 2005 ICF Canoe Sprint World Championships in Zagreb. She lives in Ebental near Klagenfurt.
