= Egidijus Balčiūnas =

Lithuanian canoeist (born 1975)

Medal record

Men's canoe sprint

World Championships
Gold medal – first place	2001 Poznań	K-2 200 m
Gold medal – first place	2002 Seville	K-2 200 m
Gold medal – first place	2003 Gainesville	K-2 200 m
Silver medal – second place	2001 Poznań	K-2 500 m
Silver medal – second place	2005 Zagreb	K-2 200 m
Bronze medal – third place	2003 Gainesville	K-2 500 m
Bronze medal – third place	2005 Zagreb	K-2 500 m

European Championships
Gold medal – first place	2004 Poznań	K-2 200 m
Silver medal – second place	2004 Poznań	K-2 500 m
Silver medal – second place	2006 Račice	K-2 200 m
Silver medal – second place	2008 Milan	K-2 200 m
Bronze medal – third place	2008 Milan	K-2 500 m

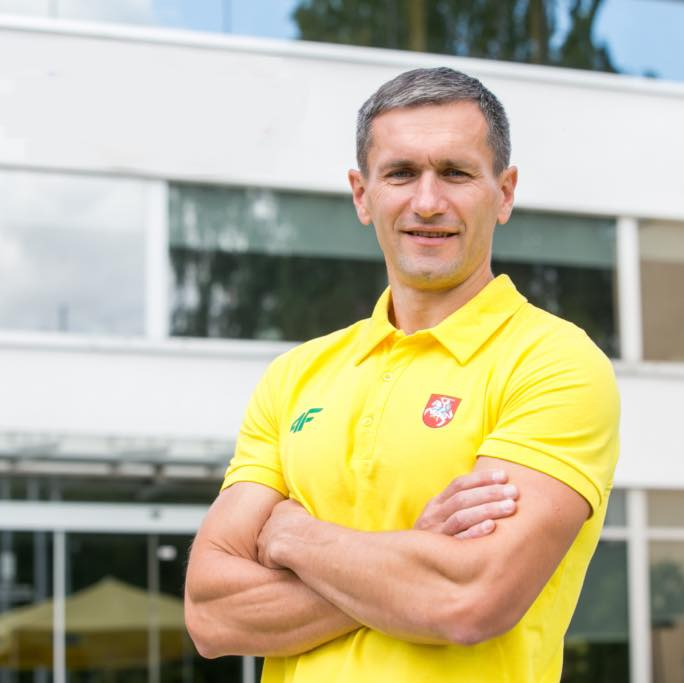
Egidijus_Balčiūnas

Egidijus Balčiūnas (born 7 May 1975, in Marijampolė) is a Lithuanian sprint canoer. He won seven medals at the ICF Canoe Sprint World Championships with three golds (K-2 200 m: 2001, 2002, 2003), two silvers (K-2 200 m: 2005, K-2 500 m: 2001), and two bronzes (K-2 500 m: 2003, 2005).

Balčiūnas also competed in four Summer Olympics, earning his best finish of seventh in the K-2 500 m event at Athens in 2004.

Balčiūnas now lives in Vilnius. He is 189 cm (6 ft 2 in) tall and weighs 89 kg (196 lb).
