= Roman Rynkiewicz =

Polish canoeist

Medal record

Men's canoe sprint
Event	1st	2nd	3rd
Olympic Games	0	0	0
World Championships	1	0	2
European Championships	0	2	4
European Games	0	0	0
Total	1	2	6

World Championships
Gold medal – first place	2002 Seville	C-4 1000 m
Bronze medal – third place	2003 Gainesville	C-4 1000 m
Bronze medal – third place	2010 Poznań	C-1 4 x 200 m

European Championships
Silver medal – second place	2005 Poznań	C4-500m
Silver medal – second place	2009 Brandenburg	C2-500 m
Bronze medal – third place	2001 Milan	C4-500 m
Bronze medal – third place	2001 Milan	C4-1000 m
Bronze medal – third place	2005 Poznań	C2-1000m
Bronze medal – third place	2011 Belgrade	C-2 500 m

Roman Rynkiewicz (born November 17, 1981) is a Polish sprint canoeist who has competed since the early 2000s. He won three medals at the ICF Canoe Sprint World Championships, including a gold (C-4 1000 m: 2002) and two bronzes (C-1 4 × 200 m: 2010, C-4 1000 m: 2003).

Rynkiewicz finished ninth in the C-2 500 m event at the 2008 Summer Olympics in Beijing.
