= Joanna Skowroń =

Polish canoeist

Medal record

Women's canoe sprint
Event	1st	2nd	3rd
Olympic Games	0	0	0
World Championships	1	5	5
European Championships	1	2	2
European Games	0	0	0
Total	2	7	7

World Championships
Gold medal – first place	2002 Seville	K-4 1000 m
Silver medal – second place	2001 Poznań	K-4 1000 m
Silver medal – second place	2002 Seville	K-2 200 m
Silver medal – second place	2003 Gainesville	K-4 500 m
Silver medal – second place	2005 Zagreb	K-4 200 m
Silver medal – second place	2005 Zagreb	K-4 500 m
Bronze medal – third place	1999 Milan	K-4 500 m
Bronze medal – third place	2001 Poznań	K-4 200 m
Bronze medal – third place	2003 Gainesville	K-2 500 m
Bronze medal – third place	2003 Gainesville	K-4 200 m
Bronze medal – third place	2005 Zagreb	K-2 1000 m

European Championships
Gold medal – first place	2002 Szeged	K2-500 m
Silver medal – second place	2002 Szeged	K2-1000 m
Bronze medal – third place	2001 Milan	K4-200 m
Silver medal – second place	2001 Milan	K2-1000 m
Bronze medal – third place	2002 Szeged	K4-500 m

Joanna Skowroń (born 16 April 1979 in Gorzów Wielkopolski) is a Polish sprint canoeist who competed from the late 1990s to the mid-2000s. She won eleven medals at the ICF Canoe Sprint World Championships with a gold (K-4 1000 m: 2002), five silvers (K-2 200 m: 2002, K-4 200 m: 2005, K-4 500 m: 2003, 2005, K-4 1000 m: 2001) and five bronzes (K-2 500 m: 2003, K-2 1000 m: 2005, K-4 200 m: 2001, 2003; K-4 500 m: 1999).

Skowroń also competed in two Summer Olympics, earning her best finish of fourth twice in the K-4 500 m event (2000, 2004).
