= Adam Ginter =

Polish sprint canoer

Medal record

Men's canoe sprint
| Event | 1st | 2nd | 3rd |
|---|---|---|---|
| Olympic Games | 0 | 0 | 0 |
| World Championships | 1 | 1 | 4 |
| European Championships | 0 | 1 | 3 |
| European Games | 0 | 0 | 0 |
| Total | 1 | 2 | 7 |

World Championships
| Gold medal – first place | 2002 Seville | C-4 1000 m |
| Silver medal – second place | 2003 Gainesville | C-4 500 m |
| Bronze medal – third place | 2002 Seville | C-4 500 m |
| Bronze medal – third place | 2003 Gainesville | C-4 1000 m |
| Bronze medal – third place | 2005 Zagreb | C-4 500 m |
| Bronze medal – third place | 2010 Poznań | C-1 4 x 200 m |

European Championships
| Silver medal – second place | 2005 Poznań | C4-500m |
| Bronze medal – third place | 2001 Milan | C4-500 m |
| Bronze medal – third place | 2001 Milan | C4-1000 m |
| Bronze medal – third place | 2008 Milan | C4-1000 m |

Adam Ginter is a Polish sprint canoer who has competed since the early first decade of the 21st century. He won six medals at the ICF Canoe Sprint World Championships with a gold (C-4 1000 m: 2002), a silver (C-4 500 m: 2003), and four bronzes (C-1 4 × 200 m: 2010, C-4 500 m: 2002, 2005; C-4 1000 m: 2003).
