= Marco Herszel =

German canoeist (born 1979)

Medal record

Men's canoe sprint

World Championships
Gold medal – first place	2007 Duisburg	K-4 1000 m
Silver medal – second place	2005 Zagreb	K-2 1000 m
Bronze medal – third place	2001 Poznań	K-2 1000 m
Bronze medal – third place	2003 Gainesville	K-2 1000 m

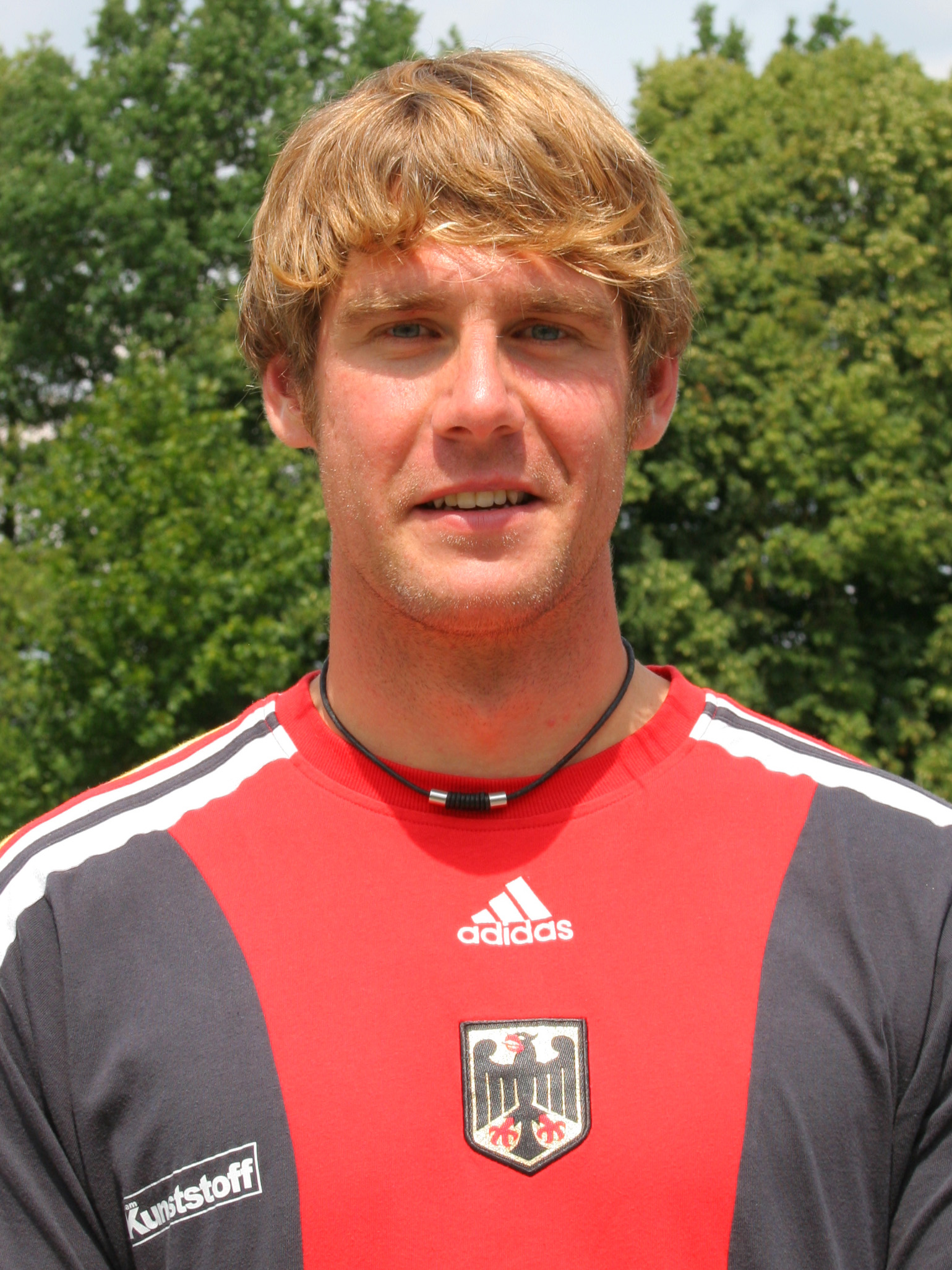
Herszel in 2007

Marco Herszel (born 2 June 1979 in Schönebeck, Bezirk Magdeburg) is a German sprint canoeist who competed in the early to mid-2000s. He won four medals at the ICF Canoe Sprint World Championships a gold (K-4 1000 m: 2007), a silver (K-2 1000 m: 2005) and two bronzes (K-2 1000 m: 2001, 2003).

Herszel also finished sixth in the K-2 1000 m event at the 2004 Summer Olympics in Athens.
