= Aleksey Skurkovskiy =

Belarusian canoeist

Medal record

Men's canoe sprint

World Championships
Silver medal – second place	2002 Seville	K-4 500 m

Aleksey Leonidovich Skurkovskiy (Russian: Алексей Леонидович Скурковский; born April 2, 1981) is a Belarusian sprint canoer from Mozyr who competed in the early 2000s. He won a silver medal in the K-4 500 m event at the 2002 ICF Canoe Sprint World Championships in Seville.
