= Ladislav Belovič =

Slovak canoeist

Medal record

Men's canoe sprint

World Championships
| Gold medal – first place | 2002 Seville | K-4 200 m |

Ladislav Belovič is a Slovak sprint canoer who competed in the early 2000s. He won a gold medal in the K-4 200 m event at the 2002 ICF Canoe Sprint World Championships in Seville.
