= Raman Piatrushenka =

Belarusian canoeist (born 1980)

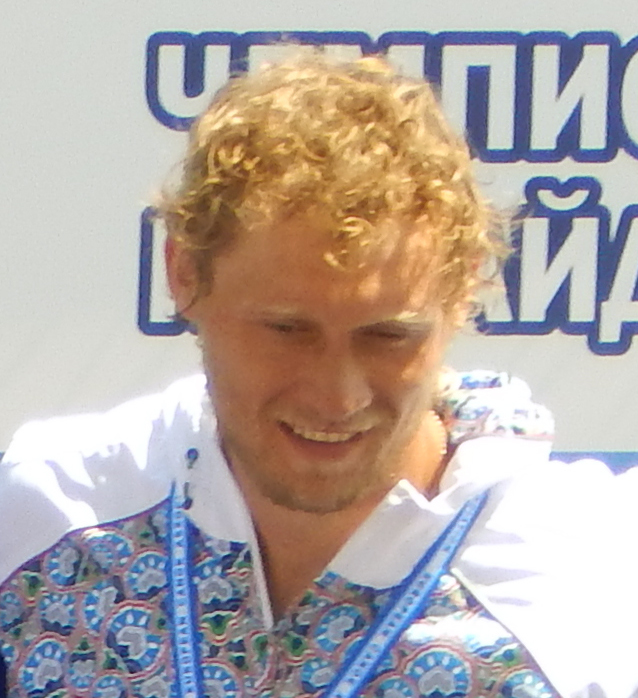
- Raman Piatrushenka at the 2016 European Canoe Sprint Championships Men's Canoe Double 500m Award Ceremony

Personal information
- Born: 25 December 1980 (age 45) Kalinkavičy, Belarus
- Height: 1.91 m (6 ft 3 in)
- Weight: 91 kg (201 lb)

Sport
- Sport: Canoe sprint
- Club: SK FPB Mazyr
- Coached by: Vladimir Shantarovich
Medal record
Men's canoe sprint
Representing Belarus
Olympic Games
| Gold medal – first place | 2008 Beijing | K-4 1000 m |
| Silver medal – second place | 2012 London | K-2 200 m |
| Bronze medal – third place | 2004 Athens | K-2 500 m |
| Bronze medal – third place | 2008 Beijing | K-2 500 m |
World Championships
| Gold medal – first place | 2005 Zagreb | K-4 500 m |
| Gold medal – first place | 2007 Duisburg | K-2 200 m |
| Gold medal – first place | 2009 Dartmouth | K-2 200 m |
| Gold medal – first place | 2009 Dartmouth | K-2 500 m |
| Gold medal – first place | 2009 Dartmouth | K-4 200 m |
| Gold medal – first place | 2009 Dartmouth | K-4 1000 m |
| Gold medal – first place | 2010 Poznań | K-2 500 m |
| Silver medal – second place | 2002 Seville | K-4 500 m |
| Silver medal – second place | 2003 Gainesville | K-2 500 m |
| Silver medal – second place | 2007 Duisburg | K-2 500 m |
| Silver medal – second place | 2010 Poznań | K-4 1000 m |
| Silver medal – second place | 2013 Duisburg | K–2 500 m |
| Bronze medal – third place | 2005 Zagreb | K-4 200 m |
| Bronze medal – third place | 2006 Szeged | K-4 1000 m |
| Bronze medal – third place | 2011 Szeged | K-2 200 m |
| Bronze medal – third place | 2014 Moscow | K-2 500 m |
| Bronze medal – third place | 2017 Račice | K-2 500 m |
European Championships
| Gold medal – first place | 2011 Belgrade | K-2 500 m |
| Silver medal – second place | 2011 Belgrade | K-2 200 m |
| Bronze medal – third place | 2012 Zagreb | K-2 500 m |
| Bronze medal – third place | 2014 Brandenburg | K-2 500 m |

Raman Ivanavich Piatrushenka or Roman Petrushenko (Belarusian: Раман Іванавіч Пятрушэнка; born 25 December 1980) is a Belarusian sprint canoeist who has competed since 2000. Competing in three Summer Olympics, he won four medals with one gold (K-4 1000 m: 2008), one silver (K-2 200m: 2012) and two bronzes (K-2 500 m: 2004, 2008).

Piatrushenka's first success on the international stage came at the 2000 European under-23 Championships in Boulogne, France as a member of the Belarus K-4 crew which won both the 500 m and 1000 m gold medals.

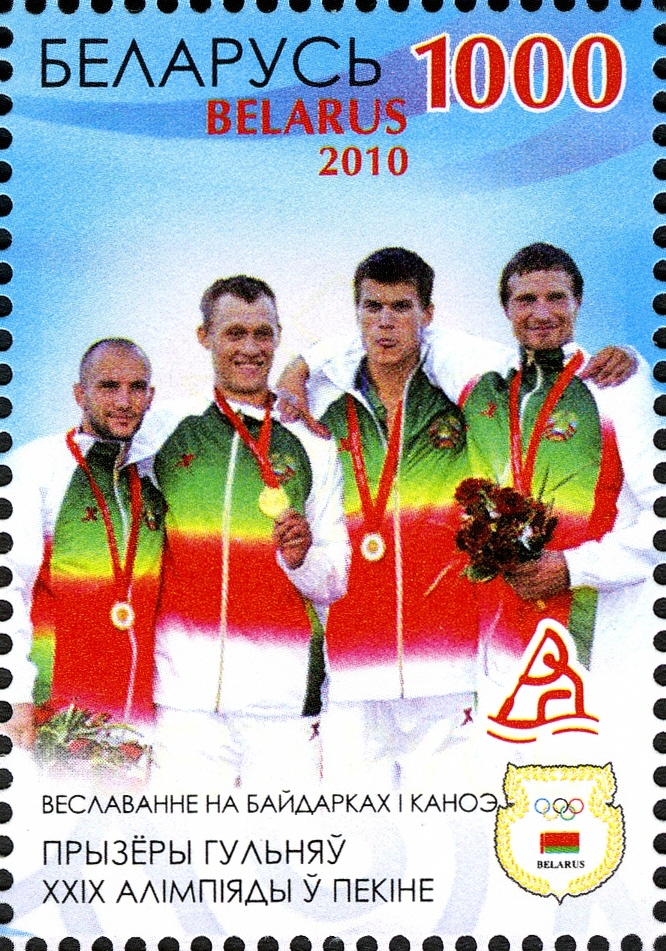
Beijing K-4 1000 m team on a 2010 Belarusian stamp: Abalmasau, Piatrushenka (2nd left), Litvinchuk and Makhneu

At the 2001 European championships in Milan, he was persuaded to enter the K-4 races, winning his first senior medals – the 500 m and 1000 m bronze. In the K-1 1000m however, he could only finish 17th.

At the 2002 European under-23 Championships in Zagreb, he won the K-1 1000 m gold medal, as well as retaining both K-4 titles. Having rejoined the senior K-4 crew on a permanent basis, he won his first world championship medal, the K-4 1000 m silver, in Seville. Senior K-1 races were proving harder though and he again failed to reach any major finals in 2002.

Realising he was not yet ready to challenge for senior K-1 medals he instead teamed up with Vadzim Makhneu to compete in K-2 races. On their first World Cup outing in Szeged in May 2003, they beat a world-class field including Germans Rauhe and Wieskötter over 500 m. At the 2003 World Championships in Gainesville, USA, they claimed the silver medal.

In 2004 at the Athens Olympics they won the K-2 500 m bronze medal.

In 2005 they took a break from the K-2 (and each other). Meanwhile, the Belarusian four, with Piatrushenka as the "engine", established themselves as the top K-4 500m crew in the world. A gold medal at the European Championships in Poznań was followed by victory in the World Championship final in Zagreb. This was Belarus's first world championship team kayak gold medal since independence. He also won nine more medals at the ICF Canoe Sprint World Championships with six gold (K-2 200 m: 2007, 2009; K-2 500 m: 2009, 2010; K-4 200 m: 2009, K-4 1000 m: 2009), two silvers (K-2 500 m: 2007, K-4 1000 m: 2010), and a bronze (K-4 1000 m: 2006).

In June 2015, he competed in the inaugural European Games, for Belarus in canoe sprint, in the Men's K-2 1000m with Vitaliy Bialko and K-4 1000m with Pavel Miadzvedzeu, Aleh Yurenia, and Vitaliy Bialko. He earned bronze medals in both areas.
