= Alina Platon =

Romanian canoeist

Medal record

Women's canoe sprint

World Championships
Silver medal – second place	2005 Zagreb	K-4 1000 m
Bronze medal – third place	2006 Szeged	K-4 500 m

Alina Platon is a Romanian sprint canoer who competed in the mid first decade of the 21st century. She won two medals at the ICF Canoe Sprint World Championships with a silver (K-4 1000 m: 2005) and a bronze (K-4 500 m: 2006).
