= 2002 ICF Canoe Sprint World Championships =

Canoe racing event in Seville, Spain

- Host city: Seville, Spain

The 2002 ICF Canoe Sprint World Championships were held in Seville, Spain.

The men's competition consisted of nine Canadian (single paddle, open boat) and nine kayak events. Women competed in nine events, all in kayak.

This was the 32nd championships in canoe sprint.

== Doping controversy ==
Dmitiry Sabin of Ukraine won the silver in the C-1 200 m event, but was disqualified when he tested positive for doping. Sabin became the first person to fail a doping test in canoe sprint at an Olympic or world championship level though he did compete at the following year's world championships.

== Medal summary ==
=== Men's ===
Non-Olympic classes

==== Canoe ====
Event	Gold		Silver		Bronze	
C-1 200 m	Maksim Opalev (RUS)	39.257	Andrzej Jezierski (POL)	39.843	Christian Gille (GER)	40.176
C-1 500 m	Maksim Opalev (RUS)	1:50.596	György Kolonics (HUN)	1:51.636	Andreas Dittmer (GER)	1:51.843
C-1 1000 m	Andreas Dittmer (GER)	3:49.031	Maksim Opalev (RUS)	3:49.644	Steve Giles (CAN)	3:50.737
C-2 200 m	Cuba; Ibrahim Rojas; Ledis Balceiro	37.027	Czech Republic; Petr Fuksa; Petr Netušil	37.100	Romania; Mikhail Vartolemei; Ionel Averian	37.240
C-2 500 m	Cuba; Ibrahim Rojas; Ledis Balceiro	1:43.467	Romania; Florin Popescu; Silviu Simioncencu	1:43.960	Russia; Sergey Ulegin; Aleksandr Kostoglod	1:44.280
C-2 1000 m	Poland; Marcin Kobierski; Michał Śliwiński	3:32.456	Cuba; Ibrahim Rojas; Ledis Balceiro	3:33.676	Canada; Richard Dalton; Mike Scarola	3:33.969
C-4 200 m	Russia; Maksim Opalev; Roman Kruglyakov; Sergey Ulegin; Aleksandr Kostoglod	33.650	Czech Republic; Petr Fuksa; Jan Břečka; Petr Procházka; Karel Kožíšek	33.964	Romania; Mikhail Vartolemei; Ionel Averian; Mitică Pricop; Petre Condrat	34.237
C-4 500 m	Romania; Mikhail Vartolemei; Ionel Averian; Mitică Pricop; Florin Popescu	1:34.758	Russia; Konstantin Fomichev; Aleksandr Artemida; Roman Krugylakov; Andrey Kabanov	1:35.231	Poland; Daniel Jędraszko; Adam Ginter; Michał Śliwiński; Marcin Grzybowski	1:35.338
C-4 1000 m	Poland; Andrzej Jezierski; Adam Ginter; Michal Gajowink; Roman Rynkiewicz	3:17.794	Canada; Dimitri Joukovski; Maxim Boilard; Tamas Buday Jr. Attila Buday	3:18.127	Belarus; Aleksandr Zhukovskiy; Aleksandr Kurlandchik; Aleksandr Bagdanovich; Sermen Saponenko	3:18.421

==== Kayak ====
Event	Gold	Silver	Bronze
K-1 200 m	Ronald Rauhe (GER)	Anton Ryakhov (UZB)	Roman Petrukanecas (LTU)
K-1 500 m	Nathan Baggaley (AUS)	Petar Merkov (BUL)	Anton Ryakhov (UZB)
K-1 1000 m	Eirik Verås Larsen (NOR)	Javier Correa (ARG)	Adam Seroczyński (POL)
K-2 200 m	Lithuania; Alvydas Duonėla; Egidijus Balčiūnas	Poland; Marek Twardowski; Adam Wysocki	Germany; Ronald Rauhe; Tim Wieskötter
K-2 500 m	Germany; Ronald Rauhe; Tim Wieskötter	Poland; Adam Wysocki; Marek Twardowski	Hungary; Zoltán Kammerer; Botond Storcz
K-2 1000 m	Sweden; Markus Oscarsson; Henrik Nilsson	Norway; Eirik Verås Larsen; Nils Fjeldheim	Hungary; Ákos Verecki; Krisztián Veréb
K-4 200 m	Slovakia; Martin Chorváth; Rastislav Kužel; Ladislav Belovič; Juraj Lipták	Spain; Manuel Muñoz; Jaime Acuña; Aike González; Oier Aizpurua	Hungary; Vince Fehérvári; Róbert Hegedűs; Gábor Horvárth; István Beé
K-4 500 m	Slovakia; Richard Riszdorfer; Michal Riszdorfer; Erik Vlček; Juraj Bača	Belarus; Roman Piatrushenko; Aleksey Skurkovskiy; Aleksey Abalmasov; Vadzim Makhneu	Spain; Manuel Muñoz; Jaime Acuña; Aike González; Oier Aizpurua
K-4 1000 m	Slovakia; Richard Riszdorfer; Michal Riszdorfer; Erik Vlček; Juraj Bača	Germany; Mark Zabel; Björn Bach; Stefan Ulm; Andreas Ihle	Bulgaria; Petar Merkov; Milko Kazanov; Ivan Hristov; Yordano Yordanov

=== Women's ===
Non-Olympic classes

==== Kayak ====
Event	Gold	Silver	Bronze
K-1 200 m	Teresa Portela (ESP)	Caroline Brunet (CAN)	Elżbieta Urbańczyk (POL)
K-1 500 m	Katalin Kovács (HUN)	Caroline Brunet (CAN)	Josefa Idem (ITA)
K-1 1000 m	Katalin Kovács (HUN)	Katrin Wagner (GER)	Josefa Idem (ITA)
K-2 200 m	Spain; Beatriz Manchón; Sonia Molanes	Poland; Aneta Pastuszka; Joanna Skowroń	Bulgaria; Bonka Pindzeva; Delyana Dacheva
K-2 500 m	Hungary; Szilvia Szabó; Kinga Bóta	Germany; Katrin Wagner; Manuela Mucke	Spain; Sonia Molanes; Beatriz Manchón
K-2 1000 m	Hungary; Szilvia Szabó; Kinga Bóta	Germany; Nadine Opgen-Rhein; Manuela Mucke	Israel; Adi Gafni; Larissa Pessakhovitch
K-4 200 m	Hungary; Nataša Janić; Szilvia Szabó; Erzsébet Viski; Tímea Paksy	Spain; Teresa Portela; Sonia Molanes; Beatriz Manchón; Maria Garcia	Germany; Katrin Wagner; Anett Schuck; Manuela Mucke; Maike Nollen
K-4 500 m	Hungary; Katalin Kovács; Szilvia Szabó; Kinga Bóta; Erzsébet Viski	Germany; Katrin Wagner; Anett Schuck; Manuela Mucke; Maike Nollen	Spain; Teresa Portela; Sonia Molanes; Beatriz Manchón; Maria Garcia
K-4 1000 m	Poland; Aneta Pastuszka; Joanna Skowroń; Karolina Sadalska; Aneta Białkowska	China; Zhong Hongyan; Fan Lina; Gao Yi; Xu Linbei	Hungary; Tímea Paksy; Katalin Moni; Alexandra Keresztesi; Erzsébet Viski

== Medal table ==
Rank	Nation	Gold	Silver	Bronze	Total
1	Hungary	6	1	4	11
2	Germany	3	5	4	12
3	Poland	3	4	3	10
4	Russia	3	2	1	6
5	Slovakia	3	0	0	3
6	Spain	2	2	3	7
7	Cuba	2	1	0	3
8	Romania	1	1	2	4
9	Norway	1	1	0	2
10	Lithuania	1	0	1	2
11	Australia	1	0	0	1
11	Sweden	1	0	0	1
13	Canada	0	3	2	5
14	Czech Republic	0	2	0	2
15	Bulgaria	0	1	2	3
16	Belarus	0	1	1	2
16	Uzbekistan	0	1	1	2
18	Argentina	0	1	0	1
18	China	0	1	0	1
18	Ukraine	0	1	0	1
21	Italy	0	0	2	2
22	Israel	0	0	1	1
Totals (22 entries)		27	28	27	82
