= Aliaksei Abalmasau =

Belarusian sprint canoeist

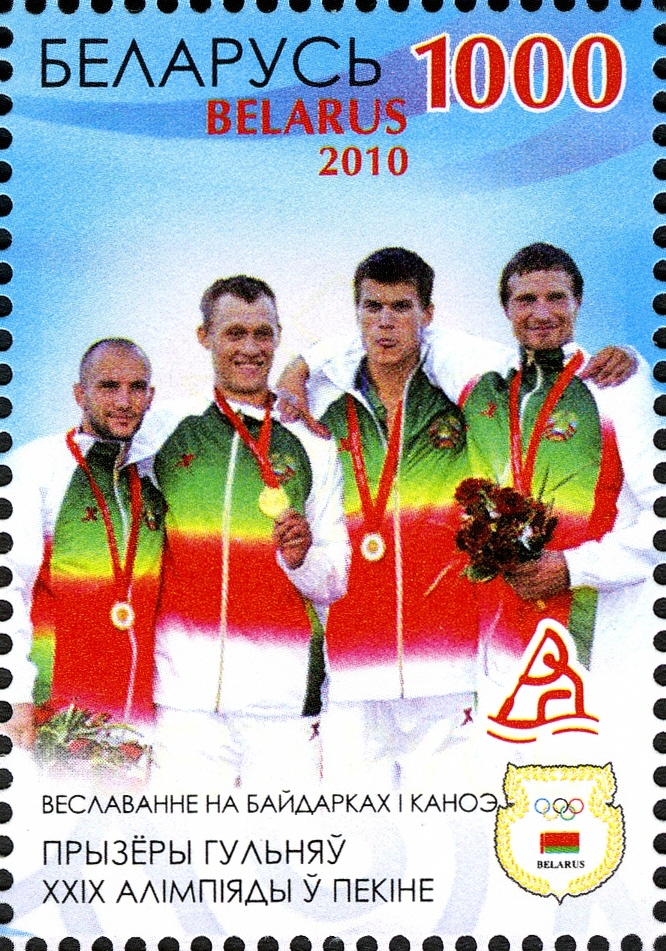
- Beijing K-4 1000 m team on a 2010 Belarusian stamp: Abalmasau (left), Piatrushenka, Litvinchuk and Makhneu

Personal information
- Born: 20 June 1980 (age 46) Barysaŭ, Byelorussian SSR, Soviet Union
- Height: 1.80 m (5 ft 11 in)
- Weight: 83 kg (183 lb)

Sport
- Sport: Canoe sprint
- Club: Dynamo Barisov; Dynamo Minsk
Medal record
Representing Belarus
Olympic Games
Gold medal – first place	2008 Beijing	K-4 1000 m
World Championships
Gold medal – first place	2005 Zagreb	K-4 500 m
Gold medal – first place	2009 Dartmouth	K-4 1000 m
Silver medal – second place	2002 Seville	K-4 500 m
Silver medal – second place	2010 Poznań	K-4 1000 m
Bronze medal – third place	2005 Zagreb	K-4 200 m
Bronze medal – third place	2006 Szeged	K-4 1000 m

Aliaksei Aliaksandravich Abalmasau (or Aleksey Abalmasov, Belarusian: Аляксей Абалмасаў, born 20 June 1980) is a Belarusian sprint canoeist who has competed since 1998. Competing in two Summer Olympics, he won a gold medal in the K-4 1000 m event at Beijing in 2008.

Abalmasau's first senior appearance was at the 2000 European championships. They rapidly challenged the world's elite, winning two bronze medals at the European championships in Milan in 2001 and the world championship silver medal in Seville in 2002. In 2003, however, early-season results were not repeated at the world championships in Gainesville, USA as they finished out of the medals.

In 2004, with Dziamyan Turchyn now on board in place of Aleksey Skurkovskiy they won the senior European K-2 500 m silver medal in Poznań, Poland. In the K-4 1000 m Olympic final in Athens, they finished sixth.

In 2005 a gold medal in the European final was followed by victory at the 2005 World Championships in Zagreb, Croatia. They also won the bronze medal in the K-4 200 m final.

At the 2006 European Championships in Račice, Czech Republic, Abalmasau and his K-4 teammates did not defend their 500 m title, focusing instead on their least favourite distance, the 1000 m, which will be the only K-4 event at the Beijing Olympics. They won the silver medal, their best result yet over the Olympic distance. The following day they showed their sprinting credentials by winning the gold medal in the 200m final.

At the 2006 World Championships in Szeged, Hungary, the same strategy was used. In the 1000 m they took the bronze medal, again their best-ever showing, although coach Shantarovich said they should have won, accusing the crew of lacking a "killer instinct" in major championships. In the 200 m final, however, they finished in last place after Vadzim Makhneu broke a blade.

At the 2009 world championships in Dartmouth, he won a gold in the K-4 1000 m event. Abalmasau followed up with a silver medal the following year in the K-4 1000 m event.
