= Juraj Lipták =

Slovak canoeist

Medal record

Men's canoe sprint

World Championships
Gold medal – first place	2002 Seville	K-4 200 m

Juraj Lipták is a Slovak sprint canoer who competed in the early 2000s. He won a gold medal in the K-4 200 m event at the 2002 ICF Canoe Sprint World Championships in Seville.
