= Aneta Michalak =

Polish canoeist

Medal record

Women's canoe sprint

Representing Poland
Event	1st	2nd	3rd
Olympic Games	0	0	0
World Championships	1	3	3
European Championships	0	1	1
European Games	0	0	0
Total	1	4	4

World Championships
Gold medal – first place	2002 Seville	K-4 1000 m
Silver medal – second place	2001 Poznań	K-4 1000 m
Silver medal – second place	2003 Gainesville	K-4 500 m
Silver medal – second place	2005 Zagreb	K-4 500 m
Bronze medal – third place	1999 Milan	K-4 200 m
Bronze medal – third place	1999 Milan	K-4 500 m
Bronze medal – third place	2005 Zagreb	K-2 1000 m

European Championships
Silver medal – second place	2002 Szeged	K2-1000 m
Bronze medal – third place	2002 Szeged	K4-500 m

Aneta Stanisława Michalak-Białkowska (born 6 August 1977 in Poznań) is a Polish sprint canoeist who competed from 1999 to 2005. She won seven medals at the ICF Canoe Sprint World Championships with a gold (K-4 1000 m: 2002), three silvers (K-4 500 m: 2003, 2005); (K-4 1000 m: 2001) and three bronzes (K-2 1000 m: 2005, K-4 200 m: 1999, K-4 500 m: 1999).

Michalak-Białkowska also competed in two Summer Olympics, earning her best finish of fourth on two occasions (K-4 500 m: 2000, K-4 500 m: 2004).
