= Sonia Molanes =

Spanish canoeist

Medal record

Women's canoe sprint

World Championships
Gold medal – first place	2001 Poznań	K-2 200 m
Gold medal – first place	2002 Seville	K-2 200 m
Silver medal – second place	2002 Seville	K-4 200 m
Bronze medal – third place	2001 Poznań	K-2 500 m
Bronze medal – third place	2001 Poznań	K-2 1000 m
Bronze medal – third place	2002 Seville	K-2 500 m
Bronze medal – third place	2002 Seville	K-4 500 m
Bronze medal – third place	2009 Dartmouth	K-4 500 m

Sonia Molanes Costa (born 28 May 1980 in Cangas de Morrazo) is a Spanish sprint canoeist who has competed since the early 2000's. She won eight medals at the ICF Canoe Sprint World Championships with two golds (K-2 200 m: 2001, 2002), a silver (K-4 200 m: 2002), and five bronzes (K-2 500 m: 2001, 2002; K-2 1000 m: 2001, K-4 500 m: 2002, 2009).

At the 2008 Summer Olympics in Beijing, Molanes finished fifth in the K-4 500 m event while being eliminated in the semifinals of the K-2 500 m event.
