= Loredan Popa =

Romanian canoeist

Medal record

Men's canoe sprint

World Championships
Gold medal – first place	2005 Zagreb	C-4 500 m
Gold medal – first place	2007 Duisburg	C-4 1000 m
Silver medal – second place	2005 Zagreb	C-4 1000 m
Bronze medal – third place	2006 Szeged	C-4 500 m
Bronze medal – third place	2007 Duisburg	C-4 500 m

Loredan Popa (15 July 1980, Vaslui, Romania) is a Romanian flatwater canoeist and current (2005) World and European champion in the Canadian canoe C-4 500m event.

Popa's first international title came in 2000 as a member of the Romania crew that won the C-4 1000m and C-4 500 m gold medal at the European under-23 championship in Boulogne, France.

In 2002 in Zagreb, Croatia, Popa won gold medals in both the C-4 500m and 1000m events. In the C-2 final in Zagreb, he partnered with his brother Constantin and took the bronze medal.

He then moved from his hometown club of Constructorul Hunedoara in Hunedoara, Romania to Romania's premier club Dinamo Bucharest.

In 2005, Popa was selected to represent Romania at a major senior championship. In Poznań, Poland. He won the European championship in his first attempt as a member of the C-4 500m crew, with Florin Popescu, Silviu Simioncencu and Josif Chirilă. Popa also competed in the C-4 1000m race, winning a bronze medal.

In August 2005, Popa's crew won the World Championship C-4 500m title. Popa was the only man to be selected to race over all three C-4 distances. In the 1000m event, he came close to winning another gold medal but in a tight finish Romania were just edged out by Poland and he had to settle for a silver medal. In the 200m, Popa again reached the final, finishing sixth.

In 2006, Popa won his second consecutive C-4 500m title at the 2006 Canoe Sprint European Championships in Račice, Czech Republic.
