= Michał Gajownik =

Polish canoeist

Medal record

Men's canoe sprint
Event	1st	2nd	3rd
Olympic Games	0	0	0
World Championships	1	2	2
European Championships	0	0	0
European Games	0	0	0
Total	3	2	3

World Championships
Gold medal – first place	2002 Seville	C-4 1000 m
Gold medal – first place	2005 Zagreb	C-4 1000 m
Bronze medal – third place	2005 Zagreb	C-4 500 m

European Championships
Gold medal – first place	2000 Poznań	C2-200 m
Silver medal – second place	2005 Poznań	C4-500m
Silver medal – second place	2005 Poznań	C4-1000 m
Bronze medal – third place	2001 Milan	C4-200 m
Bronze medal – third place	2001 Milan	C4-1000 m

Michał Gajownik (15 December 1981 – 13 November 2009) was a Polish sprint canoer who competed from 2000 to 2006. He won three medals at the ICF Canoe Sprint World Championships with two golds (C-4 1000 m: 2002, 2005) and a bronze (C-4 500 m: 2005). He was born in Chrzanów.

Gajownik won silver medal in C-1 500 m in Junior European Championships in 1998, after year became C-2 500 m Junior World Championships silver medalist. The following year, at age 19, he became senior European C-2 1000 m champion with Paweł Baraszkiewicz who became later a member of Posnania Poznań. At the Sydney Olympics, however, he finished in eighth place.

After Sydney, Gajownik concentrated on the four-man canoe. At the start of the 2003 season, however, he tested positive for nandrolone – same as Marcin Kobierski, twice medalist in C-2 1000 m. Both denied the charge but were given a two-year ban, which cost them a place at the 2004 Olympics.

Gajownik returned to competitive action in 2005. He was a member of the Posnania Poznań club until 2006. He was killed in a traffic collision on 13 November 2009 in Chrzanów.
