= 2005 ICF Canoe Sprint World Championships =

Canoe racing event in Zagreb, Croatia

- Host city: Zagreb, Croatia
- Dates: August 2005

The 2005 ICF Canoe Sprint World Championships were held in Zagreb, Croatia, in August 2005.

Men race as individuals, pairs and quads over 200m, 500m and 1000m in both Canoe (Canadian) (C) and Kayak (K) events, giving a total of 18 gold medals. Women compete for only 9 gold medals as they race in kayak events only.

This was the 34th championships in canoe sprint.

== Highlights ==
The undoubted stars of the Zagreb event were Natasa Janics and Katalin Kovács of Hungary who completed an unprecedented clean sweep of all three women's K-2 events.

In the men's events, the C-4 200 m final saw Maxim Opalev of Russia win the twelfth world championship gold of his career, thus equalling György Kolonics's record. Andreas Dittmer of Germany retained both the world titles he had won in Gainesville (C-1 500 m and 1000m). Ronald Rauhe and Tim Wieskötter of Germany won their fourth consecutive K-2 500 m title, whilst compatriots Christian Gille and Tomasz Wylenzek followed up their C-2 1000 m 2004 Athens Olympic success with two golds (C-2 500 m and 1000 m).

The championships also marked a change of generation as many stars had retired after the Olympics, especially in the women's events. Two-thirds of the winners at Zagreb were first-time gold medallists. Birgit Fischer won her last two of her record 38 medals, including a bronze in the K-2 200 m event with her niece, Fanny.

Germany topped the medal table, winning 10 of the 27 gold medals, followed by Hungary with six golds, then Spain and Russia with two golds each.

== Medal summary ==
=== Men's ===
Non-Olympic classes

==== Canoe ====
| Event | Gold | | Silver | | Bronze | |
|---|---|---|---|---|---|---|
| C-1 200 m | Valentin Demyanenko (UKR) | 39.264 | Maxim Opalev (RUS) | 39.588 | Zhomart Satubaldin (KAZ) | 39.984 |
| C-1 500 m | Andreas Dittmer (GER) | 1:48.409 | Paweł Baraszkiewicz (POL) | 1:49.065 | Maxim Opalev (RUS) | 1:49.609 |
| C1 1000 m | Andreas Dittmer (GER) | 3:57.119 | David Cal (ESP) | 3:58.421 | Richard Dalton (CAN) | 4:00.617 |
| C-2 200 m | Russia; Evgeny Ignatov; Nikolay Lipkin | 36.978 | Germany; Christian Gille; Tomasz Wylenzek | 37.002 | Cuba; Serguey Torres; Karel Aguilar | 37.242 |
| C-2 500 m | Germany; Christian Gille; Tomasz Wylenzek | 1:39.851 | Hungary; György Kozmann; György Kolonics | 1:40.175 | Cuba; Serguey Torres; Karel Aguilar | 1:40.271 |
| C-2 1000 m | Germany; Christian Gille; Tomasz Wylenzek | 3:37.048 | Cuba; Serguey Torres; Karel Aguilar | 3:38.080 | Hungary; György Kozmann; György Kolonics | 3:39.130 |
| C-4 200 m | Russia; Aleksandr Kovalyov; Alexander Kostoglod; Roman Kruglyakov; Maxim Opalev | 33.867 | Czech Republic; Petr Procházka; Petr Fuksa; Petr Netušil; Jan Břečka | 34.017 | Belarus; Aliaksandr Kurliandchyk; Aliaksandr Zhukouski; Semen Saponenko; Aliaksandr Bahdanovich | 30.565 |
| C-4 500 m | Romania; Loredan Popa; Silviu Simioncencu; Florin Popescu; Iosif Chirilă | 1:30.602 | Belarus; Dzmitry Rabchanka; Dzmitry Vaitsishkin; Konstantin Shcharbak; Aleksandr Vauchetskiy | 1:31.298 | Poland; Andrzej Jezierski; Michał Śliwiński; Michał Gajownik; Adam Ginter | 1:31.916 |
| C-4 1000 m | Poland; Wojciech Tyszyński; Michał Śliwiński; Andrzej Jezierski; Michał Gajownik | 3:17.407 | Romania; Constantin Popa; Loredan Popa; Florin Mironcic; Petre Condrat | 3:17.863 | Germany; Robert Nuck; Stefan Holtz; Thomas Luck; Stephan Breuing | 3:20.479 |

==== Kayak ====
| Event | Gold | | Silver | | Bronze | |
|---|---|---|---|---|---|---|
| K-1 200 m | Carlos Pérez (ESP) | 35.289 | Tomasz Mendelski (POL) | 35.697 | Anton Ryakhov (RUS) | 35.733 |
| K-1 500 m | Nathan Baggaley (AUS) | 1:36.980 | Lutz Altepost (GER) | 1:37.076 | Adam van Koeverden (CAN) | 1:37.082 |
| K-1 1000 m | Eirik Verås Larsen (NOR) | 3:29.165 | Adam van Koeverden (CAN) | 3:29.841 | Nathan Baggaley (AUS) | 3:30.069 |
| K-2 200 m | Serbia and Montenegro; Dragan Zorić; Ognjen Filipović | 32.253 | Lithuania; Alvydas Duonėla; Egidijus Balčiūnas | 32.277 | Poland; Marek Twardowski; Adam Wysocki | 32.499 |
| K-2 500 m | Germany; Ronald Rauhe; Tim Wieskötter | 1:27.583 | Poland; Marek Twardowski; Adam Wysocki | 1:29.005 | Lithuania; Alvydas Duonėla; Egidijus Balčiūnas | 1:29.347 |
| K-2 1000 m | Hungary; Roland Kökény; Gábor Kucsera | 3:18.692 | Germany; Andreas Ihle; Marco Herszel | 3:18.722 | Norway; Mattis Næss; Jacob Norenberg | 3:18.836 |
| K-4 200 m | Hungary; Viktor Kadler; István Beé; Balázs Babella; Gergely Gyertyános | 30.211 | Germany; Norman Bröckl; Björn Bach; Björn Goldschmidt; Jonas Ems | 30.301 | Belarus; Raman Piatrushenka; Aleksey Abalmasov; Dziamyan Turchyn; Vadzim Makhneu | 30.565 |
| K-4 500 m | Belarus; Raman Piatrushenka; Aleksey Abalmasov; Dziamyan Turchyn; Vadzim Makhneu | 1:20.898 | Slovakia; Michal Riszdorfer; Juraj Tarr; Andrej Wiebauer; Róbert Erban | 1:20.994 | Italy; Franco Benedini; Jaka Jazbec; Luca Piemonte; Antonio Scaduto | 1:22.634 |
| K-4 1000 m | Germany; Lutz Altepost; Norman Bröckl; Björn Bach; Arnd Goldschmidt | 2:56.282 | Slovakia; Michal Riszdorfer; Richard Riszdorfer; Erik Vlček; Róbert Erban | 2:56.558 | Poland; Paweł Baumann; Marek Twardowski; Adam Wysocki; Przemysław Gawrych | 2:57.848 |

=== Women's ===
Non-Olympic classes

==== Kayak ====
| Event | Gold | | Silver | | Bronze | |
|---|---|---|---|---|---|---|
| K-1 200 m | Maria Teresa Portela (ESP) | 40.756 | Szilvia Szabó (HUN) | 41.380 | Karen Furneaux (CAN) | 41.542 |
| K-1 500 m | Nicole Reinhardt (GER) | 1:50.407 | Karen Furneaux (CAN) | 1:51.379 | Erzsébet Viski (HUN) | 1:51.565 |
| K-1 1000 m | Katrin Wagner-Augustin (GER) | 4:00.494 | Dalma Benedek (HUN) | 4:01.406 | Karen Furneaux (CAN) | 4:03.200 |
| K-2 200 m | Hungary; Katalin Kovács; Nataša Janić | 37.101 | Spain; Maria Teresa Portela; Jana Smidakova | 38.013 | Germany; Birgit Fischer; Fanny Fischer | 38.127 |
| K-2 500 m | Hungary; Katalin Kovács; Nataša Janić | 1:39.704 | Austria; Petra Schlitzer; Viktoria Schwarz | 1:42.458 | France; Anne-Laure Viard; Marie Delattre | 1:43.118 |
| K-2 1000 m | Hungary; Katalin Kovács; Nataša Janić | 3:40.861 | Germany; Maike Nollen; Nadine Opgen-Rhein | 3:42.931 | Poland; Aneta Białkowska; Joanna Skowroń | 3:43.003 |
| K-4 200 m | Germany; Carolin Leonhardt; Nicole Reinhardt; Judith Hörmann; Katrin Wagner-Augustin | 35.151 | Poland; Iwona Pyzalska; Małgorzata Czajczyńska; Joanna Skowroń; Beata Sokołowska-Kulesza | 36.111 | Spain; Isabel García; Ana Varela; Jana Smidakova; Maria Teresa Portela | 36.189 |
| K-4 500 m | Germany; Carolin Leonhardt; Conny Waßmuth; Judith Hörmann; Katrin Wagner-Augustin | 1:31.686 | Poland; Aneta Białkowska; Aneta Konieczna; Joanna Skowroń; Iwona Pyzalska | 1:32.442 | Hungary; Tímea Paksy; Dalma Benedek; Szilvia Szabó; Kinga Bóta | 1:32.952 |
| K-4 1000 m | Hungary; Tímea Paksy; Szilvia Szabó; Erzsébet Viski; Kinga Bóta | 3:20.701 | Romania; Florica Vulpeş; Mariana Ciobanu; Lidia Talpă; Alina Platon | 3:21.889 | Germany; Birgit Fischer; Maren Knebel; Judith Hörmann; Carolin Leonhardt | 3:21.901 |

== Medal table ==
| Rank | Nation | Gold | Silver | Bronze | Total |
|---|---|---|---|---|---|
| 1 | Germany | 10 | 5 | 3 | 18 |
| 2 | Hungary | 6 | 3 | 3 | 12 |
| 3 | Spain | 2 | 2 | 1 | 5 |
| 4 | Russia | 2 | 1 | 2 | 5 |
| 5 | Poland | 1 | 5 | 4 | 10 |
| 6 | Romania | 1 | 2 | 0 | 3 |
| 7 | Belarus | 1 | 1 | 2 | 4 |
| 8 | Australia | 1 | 0 | 1 | 2 |
| 8 | Norway | 1 | 0 | 1 | 2 |
| 10 | Serbia and Montenegro | 1 | 0 | 0 | 1 |
| 10 | Ukraine | 1 | 0 | 0 | 1 |
| 12 | Canada | 0 | 2 | 4 | 6 |
| 13 | Slovakia | 0 | 2 | 0 | 2 |
| 14 | Cuba | 0 | 1 | 2 | 3 |
| 15 | Lithuania | 0 | 1 | 1 | 2 |
| 16 | Austria | 0 | 1 | 0 | 1 |
| 16 | Czech Republic | 0 | 1 | 0 | 1 |
| 18 | France | 0 | 0 | 1 | 1 |
| 18 | Italy | 0 | 0 | 1 | 1 |
| 18 | Kazakhstan | 0 | 0 | 1 | 1 |
| Totals (20 entries) | | 27 | 27 | 27 | 81 |
