= Małgorzata Czajczyńska =

Polish canoeist (born 1981)

Medal record

Women's canoe sprint
Event	1st	2nd	3rd
Olympic Games	0	0	0
World Championships	0	2	0
European Championships	0	0	2
European Games	0	0	0
Total	0	2	2

World Championships
Silver medal – second place	2003 Gainesville	K-4 500 m
Silver medal – second place	2005 Zagreb	K-4 200 m

European Championships
Bronze medal – third place	2002 Szeged	K4-500 m
Bronze medal – third place	2010 Trasona	K4-500 m

Małgorzata Czajczyńska (born 19 July 1981 in Gorzów Wielkopolski) is a Polish sprint canoer who competed in the mid-2000s. She won two silver medals at the ICF Canoe Sprint World Championships (K-4 200 m: 2005, K-4 500 m: 2003).

Czajczyńska also finished fourth in the K-4 500 m event at the 2004 Summer Olympics in Athens.
