= Adi Gafni =

Israeli sprint canoer

Medal record

Women's canoe sprint

World Championships
Bronze medal – third place	2002 Seville	K-2 1000 m

Adi Gafni (Hebrew: עדי גפני) is an Israeli sprint canoer who competed in the early 2000s. She won a bronze medal in the K-2 1000 m event at the 2002 ICF Canoe Sprint World Championships in Seville.
