= Judith Hörmann =

German canoeist

Medal record

Women's canoe sprint

World Championships
Gold medal – first place	2005 Zagreb	K-4 200 m
Gold medal – first place	2005 Zagreb	K-4 500 m
Gold medal – first place	2007 Duisburg	K-2 1000 m
Silver medal – second place	2006 Szeged	K-4 200 m
Silver medal – second place	2006 Szeged	K-4 500 m
Bronze medal – third place	2005 Zagreb	K-4 1000 m
Bronze medal – third place	2007 Duisburg	K-4 1000 m

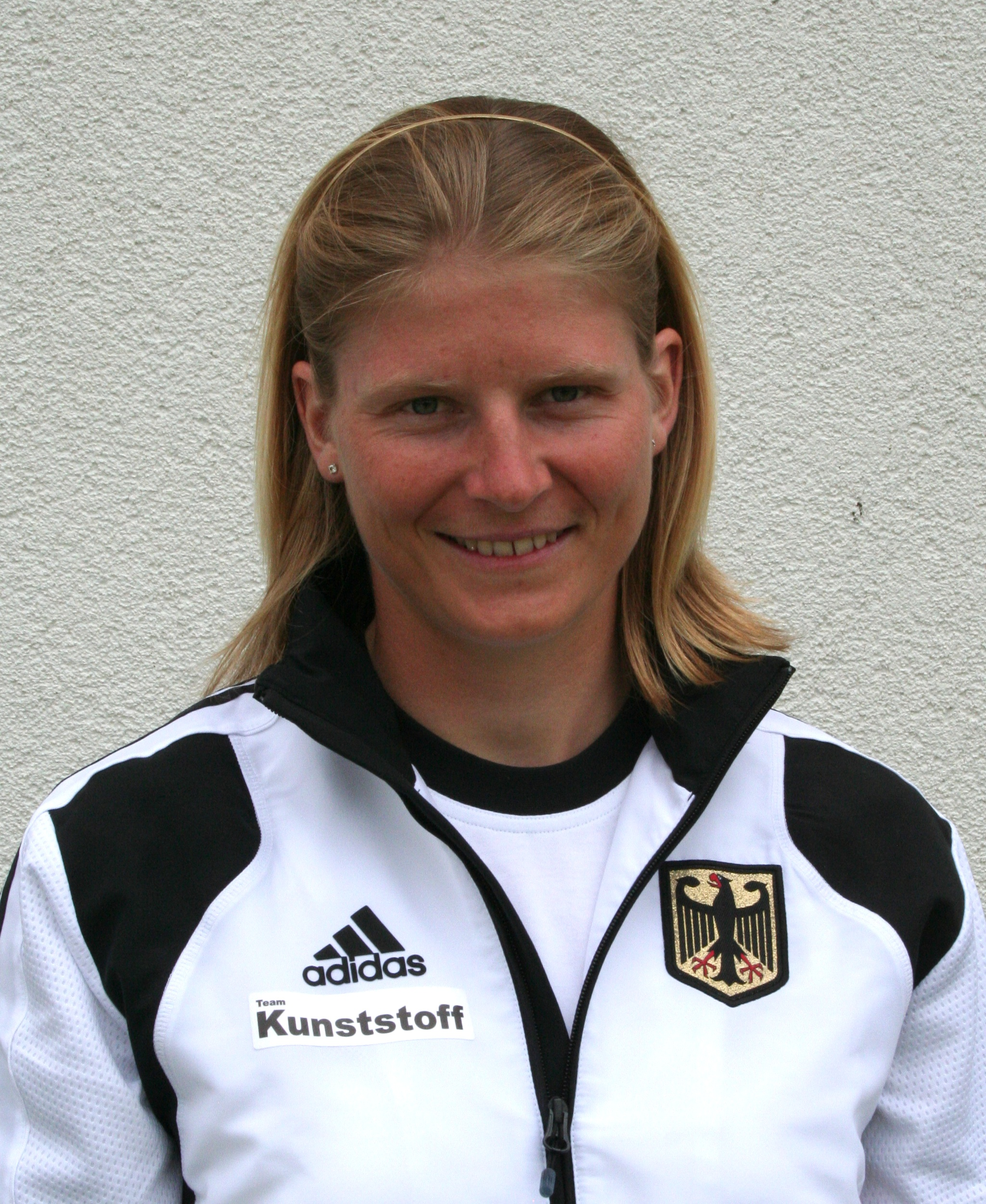

Judith Hörmann (born 1983) is a German sprint canoer who has competed since 2005. She won seven medals at the ICF Canoe Sprint World Championships with three golds (K-2 1000 m: 2007, K-4 200 m: 2005, K-4 500 m: 2005), two silvers (K-4 200 m and K-4 500 m: both 2006), and two bronzes (K-4 1000 m: 2005, 2007).
