= Sermen Saponenko =

Belarusian canoeist

Medal record

Men's canoe sprint

World Championships
Bronze medal – third place	2002 Seville	C-4 1000 m
Bronze medal – third place	2005 Zagreb	C-4 200 m

Sermen Saponenko is a Belarusian sprint canoer who competed in the early to mid-2000s. He won two bronze medals at the ICF Canoe Sprint World Championships (C-4 200 m: 2005, C-4 1000 m: 2002).
