= Samil Grigoe =

Romanian canoeist

Medal record

Men's canoe sprint

World Championships
Silver medal – second place	1999 Milan	C-4 1000 m

Samil Grigoe is a Romanian sprint canoer who competed in the late 1990s. He won a silver medal at the 1999 ICF Canoe Sprint World Championships in Milan.
