= Iwona Pyżalska =

Polish canoeist

Medal record

Women's canoe sprint

World Championships
Silver medal – second place	2005 Zagreb	K-4 200 m
Silver medal – second place	2005 Zagreb	K-4 500 m

European Championships
Silver medal – second place	2004 Poznań	K2-1000 m
Bronze medal – third place	2002 Szeged	K4-500 m

Iwona Pyżalska is a Polish sprint canoer who competed in the mid-2000s. She won two silver medals at the 2005 ICF Canoe Sprint World Championships in Zagreb, earning them in the K-4 200 m and K-4 500 m events.
