= Thomas Lück =

German sprint canoer (born 1981)

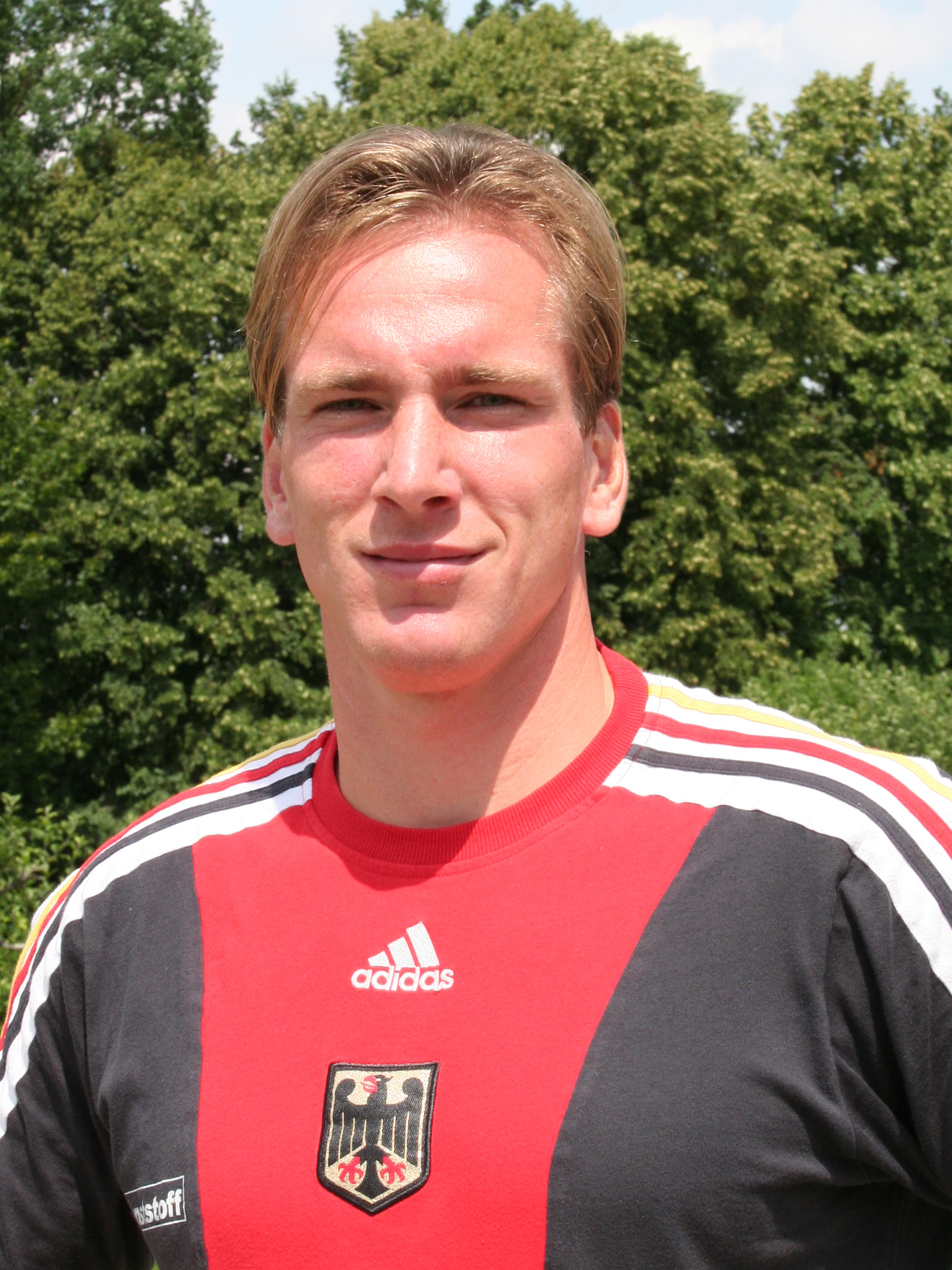

Personal information
- Born: 29 January 1981 (age 45) East Berlin, Germany

Sport
- Country: Germany
- Sport: Canoe sprint
Medal record
Canoe sprint
Representing Germany
World Championships
Gold medal – first place	2006 Szeged	C-4 1000 m
Silver medal – second place	2007 Duisburg	C-4 500 m
Silver medal – second place	2007 Duisburg	C-4 1000 m
Silver medal – second place	2009 Dartmouth	C-4 1000 m
Bronze medal – third place	2005 Zagreb	C-4 1000 m

Thomas Lück (born 29 January 1981) is a German canoe sprinter who has competed since 1998.

A junior world champion from 1998 (C-2 1000 m with Stefan Holtz), Lück won three medals at the 2004 European Under-23 Championships in Poznań, including the C-2 1000 m gold with Stephan Breuing.

He has five medals at the ICF Canoe Sprint World Championships with a gold (C-4 1000 m: 2006), three silvers (C-4 500 m: 2007, C-4 1000 m: 2007, 2009), and a bronze (C-4 1000 m: 2005).

Lück, who now lives in Rostock, is a member of the SC Neubrandenburg club.
