= Katalin Móni =

Hungarian canoeist

Medal record

Women's canoe sprint

World Championships
Bronze medal – third place	2002 Seville	K-4 1000 m

Katalin Móni is a Hungarian sprint canoer who has competed in the early 2000s. She won a bronze medal in the K-4 1000 m event at the 2002 ICF Canoe Sprint World Championships in Seville.
