= Nadine Opgen-Rhein =

German canoeist

Medal record

Women's canoe sprint

World Championships
Gold medal – first place	2001 Poznań	K-2 1000 m
Silver medal – second place	2001 Poznań	K-4 500 m
Silver medal – second place	2002 Seville	K-2 1000 m
Silver medal – second place	2003 Gainesville	K-2 1000 m
Silver medal – second place	2005 Zagreb	K-2 1000 m

Nadine Opgen-Rhein (born 1976) is a German sprint canoer who competed in the early to mid-2000s. She won five medals at the ICF Canoe Sprint World Championships with a gold (K-2 1000 m: 2001 and four silvers (K-2 1000 m: 2002, 2003, 2005; K-4 500 m: 2001).
