= Petre Condrat =

Romanian canoeist

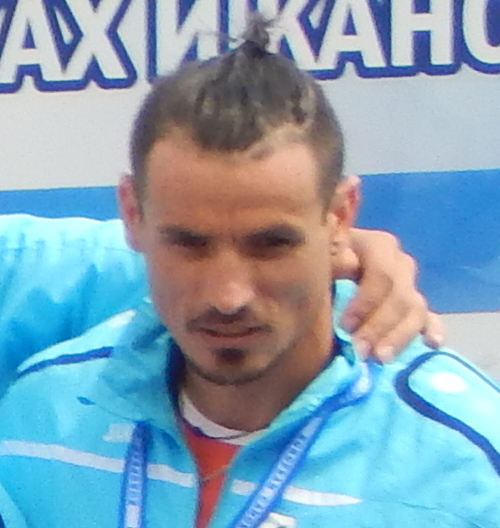
- Condrat the 2016 European Championships

Personal information
- Born: 6 June 1981 (age 45)
Medal record
Men's canoe sprint
Representing Romania
World Championships
Gold medal – first place	2003 Gainesville	C-4 500 m
Gold medal – first place	2015 Milan	C-4 1000 m
Silver medal – second place	2005 Zagreb	C-4 1000 m
Bronze medal – third place	2002 Seville	C-4 200 m
Bronze medal – third place	2003 Gainesville	C-4 200 m

Petre Condrat (born 6 June 1981) is a Romanian sprint canoer who competed in the early to mid-2000s. He won four medals at the ICF Canoe Sprint World Championships with a gold (C-4 500 m: 2003), a silver (C-4 1000 m: 2005), and two bronzes (C-4 200 m: 2002, 2003).
