= Vadzim Makhneu =

Belarusian canoeist (born 1979)

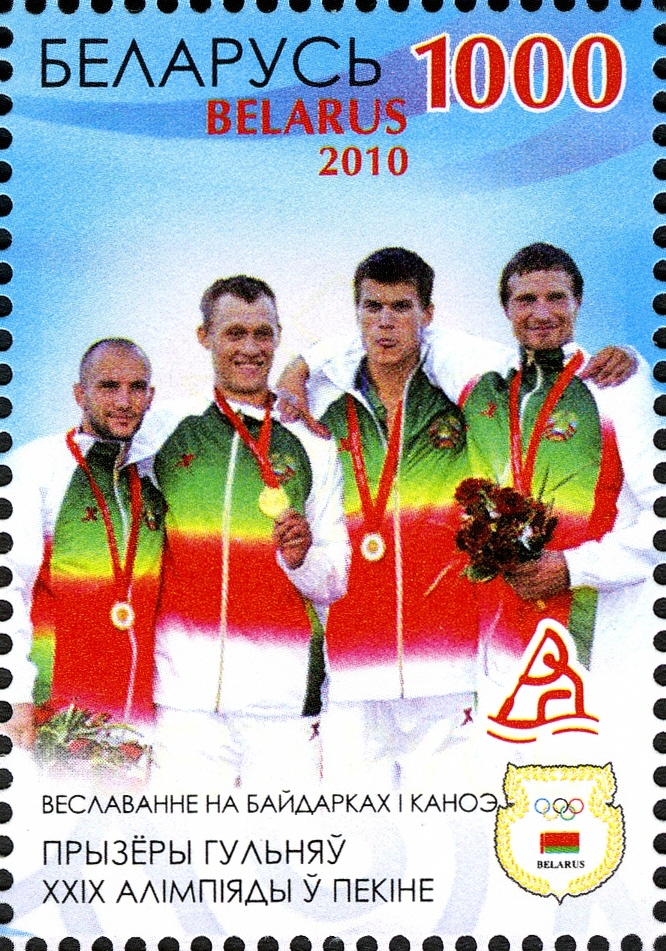
- Beijing K-4 1000 m team on a 2010 Belarusian stamp: Abalmasau, Piatrushenka, Litvinchuk and Makhneu (right)

Personal information
- Born: 21 December 1979 (age 46) Minsk, Belarus
- Height: 1.96 m (6 ft 5 in)
- Weight: 100 kg (220 lb)

Sport
- Sport: Canoe sprint
- Club: Dynamo Minsk
Medal record
Representing Belarus
Olympic Games
Gold medal – first place	2008 Beijing	K-4 1000 m
Silver medal – second place	2012 London	K-2 200 m
Bronze medal – third place	2004 Athens	K-2 500 m
Bronze medal – third place	2008 Beijing	K-2 500 m
World Championships
Gold medal – first place	2005 Zagreb	K-4 500 m
Gold medal – first place	2007 Duisburg	K-2 200 m
Gold medal – first place	2009 Dartmouth	K-2 200 m
Gold medal – first place	2009 Dartmouth	K-2 500 m
Gold medal – first place	2009 Dartmouth	K-4 200 m
Gold medal – first place	2009 Dartmouth	K-4 1000 m
Gold medal – first place	2010 Poznań	K-2 500 m
Silver medal – second place	2002 Seville	K-4 500 m
Silver medal – second place	2003 Gainesville	K-2 500 m
Silver medal – second place	2007 Duisburg	K-2 500 m
Silver medal – second place	2010 Poznań	K-4 1000 m
Silver medal – second place	2013 Duisburg	K–2 500 m
Bronze medal – third place	2005 Zagreb	K-4 200 m
Bronze medal – third place	2006 Szeged	K-4 1000 m
Bronze medal – third place	2011 Szeged	K-2 200 m
Bronze medal – third place	2014 Moscow	K-2 500 m
European Championships
Gold medal – first place	2011 Belgrade	K-2 500 m
Silver medal – second place	2011 Belgrade	K-2 200 m
Bronze medal – third place	2012 Zagreb	K-2 500 m
Bronze medal – third place	2014 Brandenburg	K-2 500 m

Vadzim Henadzevich Makhneu (Belarusian: Вадзім Генадзевіч Махнеў) or Vadim Makhnev Russian: Вадим Махнев; born 21 December 1979) is a Belarusian flatwater canoeist who has competed since 2000. Competing in three Summer Olympics, he won four medals with a gold (K-4 1000 m: 2008), a silver (K-2 200m: 2012) and two bronzes (K-2 500 m: 2004, 2008).

== Career ==
In 2001, he was promoted to the senior K-4 boat and won his first senior medals at the European championships in Milan (K-4 500 m bronze and K-4 1000 m bronze). A year later, the same crew went to the world championships in Seville and took the K-4 500 m silver medal.

In 2003, Makhneu formed a K-2 partnership with Raman Piatrushenka, moving to Mozyr to work under Piatrushenka's coach Vladimir Shantarovich. In their first season together, the pair won the 500 m silver medal at the world championships in Gainesville, USA.

This decision was amply rewarded in 2005 when the Belarus K-4 500 m crew of Piatrushenka/Abalmasau/Turchyn/Makhneu were crowned first European and then world champions.

He would win nine more medals at the ICF Canoe Sprint World Championships with a bronze in 2006 (K-4 1000 m), two more in 2007 (K-2 200 m: gold, K-2 500 m: silver), and four golds in 2009 (K-2 200 m, K-2 500 m, K-4 200 m, K-4 1000 m), and in 2010, a gold (K-2 500 m) and a silver (K-4 1000 m).

== Personal life ==
His father, Gennady, is a retired canoeist who represented the Soviet Union. He finished seventh in the K-4 1000 m event at the 1980 Summer Olympics in Moscow. His mother, Larisa, is a European bronze medalist in canoe.

In 2005, Makhneu married Alina, a receptionist of the hotel he had lived in while training in Mozyr; they had a daughter Sasha. Makhneu got married second time to Marharyta Makhneva, a fellow Olympic canoeist. They have a son, Marsel, born in January 2018. Makhnev has a law degree from the Academy of Public Administration (Belarus).
