= Andreas Dittmer =

German canoeist (born 1972)

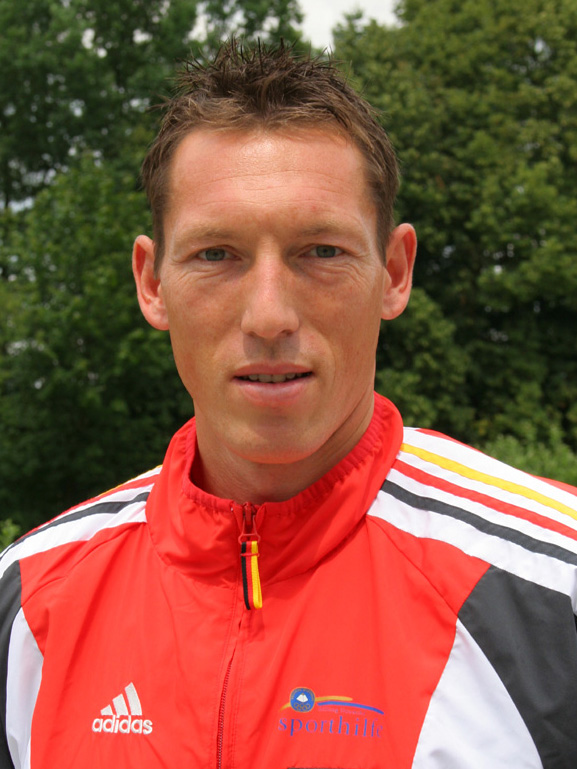

Personal information
- Born: 16 April 1972 (age 54) Neustrelitz, East Germany
Medal record
Men's canoe sprint
Representing Germany
Olympic Games
Gold medal – first place	1996 Atlanta	C-2 1000 m
Gold medal – first place	2000 Sydney	C-1 1000 m
Gold medal – first place	2004 Athens	C-1 500 m
Silver medal – second place	2004 Athens	C-1 1000 m
Bronze medal – third place	2000 Sydney	C-1 500 m
World Championships
Gold medal – first place	1994 Mexico City	C-2 1000 m
Gold medal – first place	1997 Dartmouth	C-1 1000 m
Gold medal – first place	2001 Poznań	C-1 1000 m
Gold medal – first place	2002 Seville	C-1 1000 m
Gold medal – first place	2003 Gainesville	C-1 500 m
Gold medal – first place	2003 Gainesville	C-1 1000 m
Gold medal – first place	2005 Zagreb	C-1 500 m
Gold medal – first place	2005 Zagreb	C-1 1000 m
Silver medal – second place	1998 Szeged	C-1 500 m
Silver medal – second place	1999 Milan	C-1 1000 m
Silver medal – second place	2006 Szeged	C-1 1000 m
Silver medal – second place	2007 Duisburg	C-1 500 m
Bronze medal – third place	1991 Paris	C-4 500 m
Bronze medal – third place	1993 Copenhagen	C-1 10000 m
Bronze medal – third place	1993 Copenhagen	C-2 500 m
Bronze medal – third place	1995 Duisburg	C-2 500 m
Bronze medal – third place	1995 Duisburg	C-2 1000 m
Bronze medal – third place	1998 Szeged	C-1 1000 m
Bronze medal – third place	1999 Milan	C-1 500 m
Bronze medal – third place	2001 Poznań	C-1 500 m
Bronze medal – third place	2002 Seville	C-1 500 m
Bronze medal – third place	2003 Gainesville	C-1 200 m

Andreas Dittmer (born 16 April 1972 in Neustrelitz, Bezirk Neubrandenburg) is a German sprint canoeist. The dominant sprint canoeist of his generation in 1000 m races, he has won three Olympic and eight world championship gold medals.

Dittmer won his first world championship medal - a bronze - at Paris in 1991 as a member of Germany's C-4 500 m crew. In 1994 he won the C-2 1000 m world championship with Gunar Kirchbach. At the 1996 Olympics the pair won the gold medal in the same event.

Now established as Germany's top canoe sprinter he was selected for the C-1 event and won the C-1 1000 m world title at his first attempt in Dartmouth, Canada in 1997.

At Sydney 2000 he won the C-1 1000 m gold as well as the bronze in the 500 m race. He then won three consecutive C-1 1000 m world titles (2001, 2002, 2003). In 2003 he also won his first world 500 m title, finally defeating four-time champion Maxim Opalev of Russia to claim his first "double". At the European championships too he won three straight gold medals in his specialist 1000 m event, but had to be content with four consecutive silver medals behind Opalev in the 500 m.

Dittmer went to the 2004 Summer Olympics as the overwhelming favourite for the 1000 m gold medal, having been undefeated in major finals for over four years. However he was surprisingly beaten by Spain's David Cal, who finished just 0.52 second ahead of Dittmer's time of 3:46.721.

In the C-1 500 m final Dittmer gained his revenge, edging out Cal by 0.34 seconds, to win the gold medal in a time of 1:46.383, with 500 m specialist Opalev pushed back into third place.

Dittmer's sister, Anja Dittmer, also competed at both the 2000 and 2004 Olympics. She is a triathlete.

In 2005 he reasserted his authority over 1000 m, winning his fourth European C-1 gold medal in Poznań. At the world championships, held in Zagreb, he again doubled up winning his fourth consecutive C-1 1000 m gold as well as a second C-1 500 m title.

His run of success at the European championships finally came to an end in 2006 when he was defeated by Romania's Florin Mironcic in the 1000 m final in Račice, Czech Republic.

At the 2006 World Championships in Szeged, Hungary, Dittmer suffered the misfortune of being disqualified in the C-1 500 m heats. He also lost his 1000 m crown as Mexico's Everardo Cristóbal won a shock victory ahead of the second-placed Dittmer.

Dittmer earned a silver in the C-1 500 m event at the 2007 ICF Canoe Sprint World Championships in Duisburg. He went on to compete at the 2008 Summer Olympics in Beijing, but did not medal in any of the C-1 events.

As of 2009, Dittmer has a total of 22 world championship medals.
