= Manuel Muñoz (canoeist) =

Spanish canoeist

Medal record

Men's canoe sprint

World Championships
Silver medal – second place	2002 Seville	K-4 200 m
Bronze medal – third place	2002 Seville	K-4 500 m
Bronze medal – third place	2003 Gainesville	K-4 200 m

Manuel Muñoz is a Spanish sprint canoer who competed in the early 2000s. He won a silver (K-4 200 m: 2002) and two bronze (K-4 200 m: 2003, K-4 500 m: 2002) medals at the ICF Canoe Sprint World Championships.
