= Roman Kruglyakov =

Russian canoeist

Medal record

Men's canoe sprint

World Championships
Gold medal – first place	1999 Milan	C-4 200 m
Gold medal – first place	1999 Milan	C-4 500 m
Gold medal – first place	2002 Seville	C-4 200 m
Gold medal – first place	2005 Zagreb	C-4 200 m
Silver medal – second place	2002 Seville	C-4 500 m
Bronze medal – third place	2001 Poznań	C-4 500 m
Disqualified	2003 Gainesville	C-4 200 m
Disqualified	2003 Gainesville	C-4 500 m

Roman Kruglyakov (or Krougliakov) is a Russian sprint canoeist who competed from the late 1990s to the early 2000s. He won six medals at the ICF Canoe Sprint World Championships with four golds (C-4 200 m: 1999, 2002, 2005; C-4 500 m: 1999), one silver (C-4 500 m: 2002), and one bronze (C-4 500 m: 2001).

Kruglyakov was stripped of two medals (both gold) at the 2003 ICF Canoe Sprint World Championships when his teammate Sergey Ulegin tested positive for doping.
