= Sergey Ulegin =

Russian canoeist

Medal record

Men's canoe sprint

Olympic Games
Silver medal – second place	2008 Beijing	C-2 500 m

World Championships
Gold medal – first place	2002 Seville	C-4 200 m
Gold medal – first place	2006 Szeged	C-2 500 m
Silver medal – second place	2009 Dartmouth	C-4 200 m
Bronze medal – third place	2002 Seville	C-2 500 m
Disqualified	2003 Gainesville	C-2 500 m
Disqualified	2003 Gainesville	C-4 200 m
Disqualified	2003 Gainesville	C-4 500 m

Sergey Ulegin (born October 8, 1977 in Engels) is a Russian canoeist who has been competing since 2001 He won a silver in the men's C-2 500 m event at the 2008 Summer Olympics in Beijing.

At the ICF Canoe Sprint World Championships, Ulegin has won four medals, with two golds (C-2 500 m: 2006, C-4 200 m: 2002), a silver (C-4 200 m: 2009), and a bronze (C-2 500 m: 2002).

== Doping controversy ==
At the 2003 ICF Canoe Sprint World Championships in Gainesville, Georgia in the United States, Ulegin initially won golds in the C-4 200 m and C-4 500 m events, and a silver in the C-2 500 m event. However, the medal was withdrawn after Ulegin tested positive in a dope test at those championships. A November 29, 2003 International Canoe Federation (ICF) Executive Committee meeting in Prague, Czech Republic confirmed that Ulegin's B-sample was positive like the A-test he gave in Gainesville. This led the ICF to issue a two-year suspension for Ulegin from September 14, 2003 to September 14, 2005. Ulegin became the second sprint canoeist as of 2009 stripped of his medals for doping either at the Summer Olympics or the World championships as a result. Ulegin served his two-year suspension, missing the 2004 Summer Olympics in Athens and the 2005 ICF Canoe Sprint World Championships in Zagreb, Croatia.
