= Stephan Breuing =

German sprint canoer

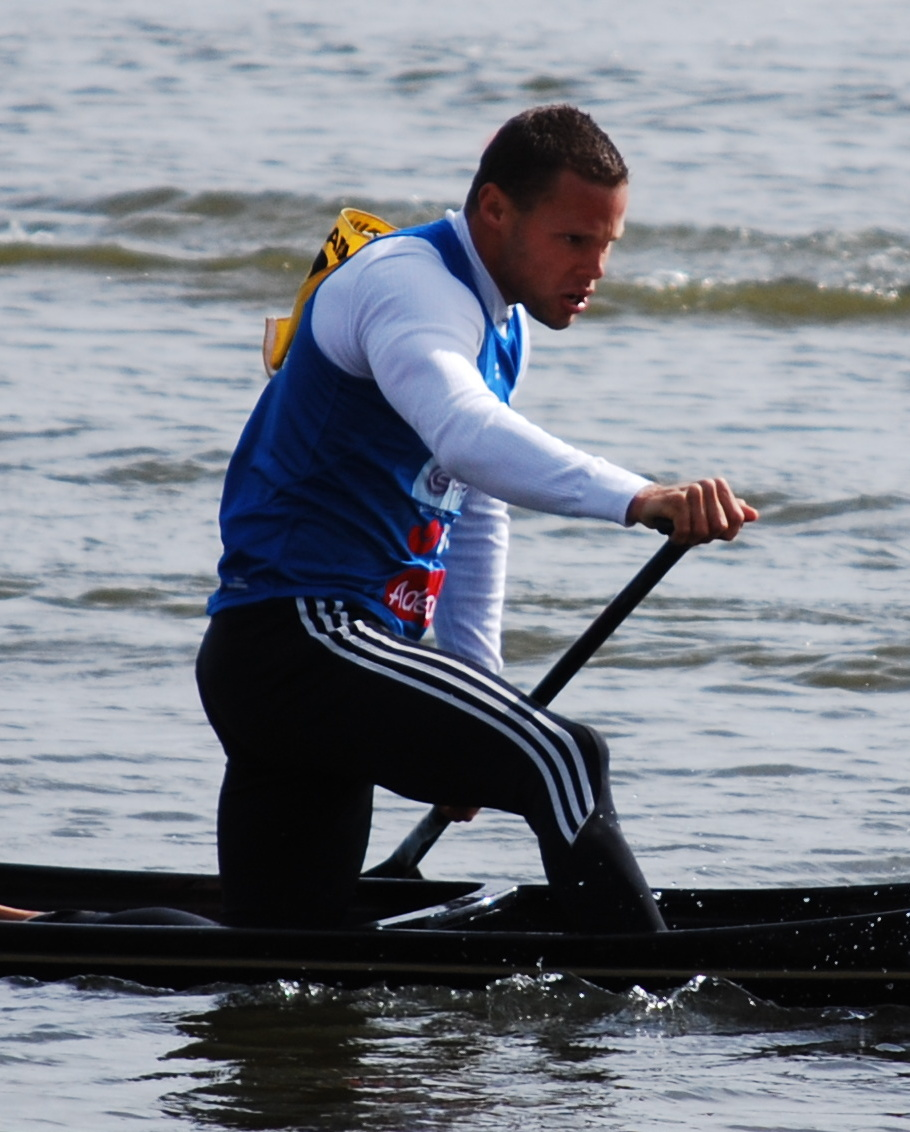

Medal record

Men's canoe sprint

World Championships
Gold medal – first place	2006 Szeged	C-4 1000 m
Bronze medal – third place	2005 Zagreb	C-4 1000 m

Stephan Breuing (born 21 September 1985, in Bochum) is a German sprint canoer who has competed since 2005. He won two medals in the C-4 1000 m event at the ICF Canoe Sprint World Championships with a gold in 2006 and a bronze in 2005.
