= Róbert Erban =

Slovak canoe sprinter

Personal information
- Born: 9 July 1972 (age 54) Piešťany, Czechoslovakia
- Height: 188 cm (6 ft 2 in)
- Weight: 85 kg (187 lb)

Sport
- Country: Czechoslovakia; Slovakia
- Sport: Canoe sprint
- Club: ŠKP Bratislava
Medal record
Men's canoe sprint
World Championships
Representing Slovakia
Gold medal – first place	2006 Szeged	K-4 500 m
Silver medal – second place	2005 Zagreb	K-4 500 m
Silver medal – second place	2005 Zagreb	K-4 1000 m
Representing Czechoslovakia
Bronze medal – third place	1991 Paris	K-2 10000 m

Róbert Erban (born 9 July 1972) is a Slovak canoe sprinter who competed from the early 1990s to the mid-2000s. He won four medals at the ICF Canoe Sprint World Championships with a gold (K-4 500 m: 2006 for Slovakia), two silvers (K-4 500 m and K-4 1000 m: both 2005 for Slovakia), and a bronze (K-2 10000 m: 1991 for Czechoslovakia).

Erban also competed in four Summer Olympics, earning his best finish of fourth twice in the K-4 1000 m event (1992 for Czechoslovakia, 2000 for Slovakia).

Erban was born in Piešťany. A member of the ŠKP club in Bratislava, he is 188 cm (6 ft 2 in) tall and weighs 85 kg (187 lb).
