= Maike Nollen =

German sprint canoer (born 1977)

Medal record

Women's canoe sprint

Olympic Games
Gold medal – first place	2004 Athens	K-4 500 m

World Championships
Silver medal – second place	2002 Seville	K-4 500 m
Silver medal – second place	2005 Zagreb	K-2 1000 m
Bronze medal – third place	2002 Seville	K-4 200 m

Maike Nollen (born 15 November 1977) is a German sprint canoer who competed in the early to mid-2000s. She won a gold medal in the K-4 500 m event at the 2004 Summer Olympics in Athens.

Nollen also won three medals at the ICF Canoe Sprint World Championships with two silvers (K-2 1000 m: 2002, K-4 500 m: 2002) and a bronze (K-4 200 m: 2002).
