= Maksim Opalev =

Russian canoeist

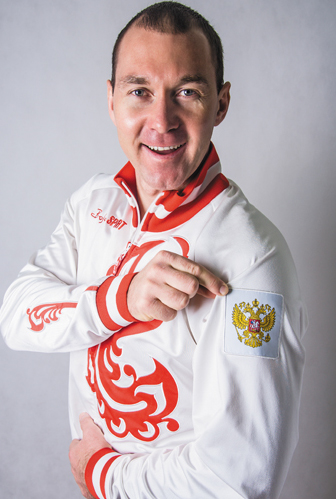

Personal information
- Born: 4 April 1979 (age 47) Volgograd, Russian SFSR, Soviet Union
- Height: 184 cm (6 ft 0 in)
- Weight: 93 kg (205 lb)

Sport
- Sport: Canoe sprint
- Club: Spartak Voronezh
Medal record
Representing Russia
Olympic Games
Gold medal – first place	2008 Beijing	C-1 500 m
Silver medal – second place	2000 Sydney	C-1 500 m
Bronze medal – third place	2004 Athens	C-1 500 m
World Championships
Gold medal – first place	1998 Szeged	C-1 500 m
Gold medal – first place	1999 Milan	C-1 200 m
Gold medal – first place	1999 Milan	C-1 500 m
Gold medal – first place	1999 Milan	C-1 1000 m
Gold medal – first place	2001 Poznań	C-1 500 m
Gold medal – first place	2002 Seville	C-1 200 m
Gold medal – first place	2002 Seville	C-1 500 m
Gold medal – first place	2002 Seville	C-4 200 m
Gold medal – first place	2003 Gainesville	C-1 200 m
Gold medal – first place	2005 Zagreb	C-4 200 m
Gold medal – first place	2006 Szeged	C-1 500 m
Silver medal – second place	1997 Dartmouth	C-4 1000 m
Silver medal – second place	2001 Poznań	C-1 200 m
Silver medal – second place	2002 Seville	C-1 1000 m
Silver medal – second place	2003 Gainesville	C-1 500 m
Silver medal – second place	2005 Zagreb	C-1 200 m
Silver medal – second place	2007 Dusiburg	C-1 200 m
Bronze medal – third place	2001 Poznań	C-4 200 m
Bronze medal – third place	2003 Gainesville	C-1 1000 m
Bronze medal – third place	2005 Zagreb	C-1 500 m
Disqualified	2003 Gainesville	C-4 200 m
Disqualified	2003 Gainesville	C-4 500 m

Maksim Alexandrovich Opalev (Russian: Максим Александрович Опалев; born 4 April 1979) is a retired Russian sprint canoeist. Competing in three Summer Olympics, he has won a complete set of medals in the C-1 500 m event (gold: 2008, silver: 2000, bronze: 2004).

Opalev's potential was evident when he won two gold medals as a sixteen-year-old at the 1995 World Junior Championships in Yamanashi, Japan. Competing against opponents two years older than himself he won the C-2 1000 m title (with Konstantin Fomichev) as well as the C-4 500 m gold. At the next edition of the world junior championships, in Lahti, Finland, in 1997, Opalev won the C-1 1000 m title.

At the ICF Canoe Sprint World Championships, Opalev has won 20 medals between 1997 and 2007. This includes eleven golds (C-1 200 m: 1999, 2002, 2003; C-1 500 m: 1998, 1999, 2001, 2002, 2006; C-1 1000 m: 1999, C-4 200 m: 2002, 2005), six silvers (C-1 200 m: 2001, 2005, 2007; C-1 500 m: 2003, C-1 1000 m: 2002, C-4 1000 m: 1997), and three bronzes (C-1 500 m: 2005, C-1 1000 m: 2003, C-4 200 m: 2001). Opalev also won two more medals at the 2003 world championships in Gainesville, Georgia, United States with golds in the C-4 200 m and C-4 500 m events, but were stripped of those medals when teammate Sergey Ulegin failed a doping test.
