= Tim Wieskötter =

German sprint canoer (born 1979)

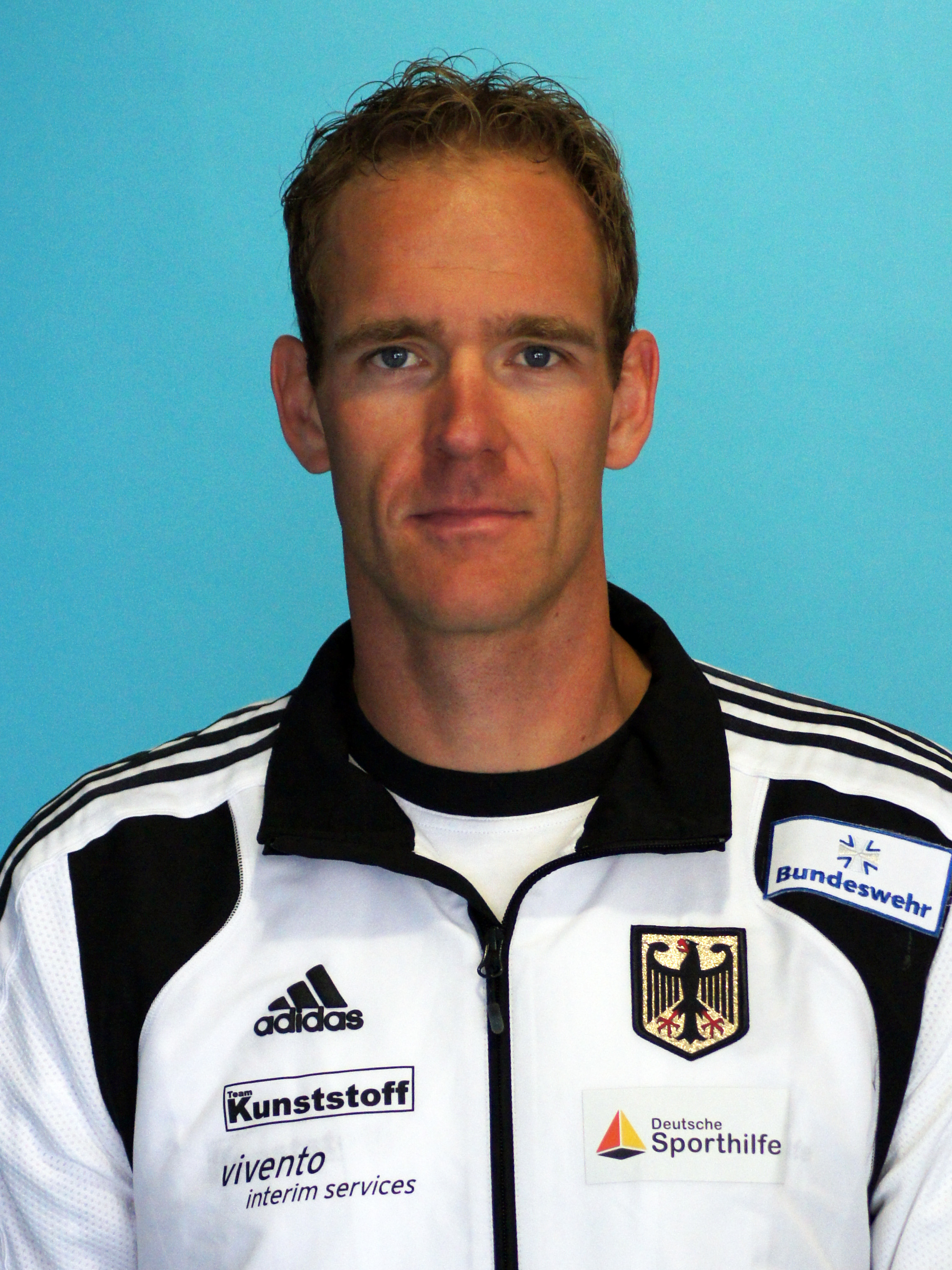
- Tim Wieskötter (2004)

Medal record

Men's canoe sprint

Olympic Games
Gold medal – first place	2004 Athens	K-2 500 m
Silver medal – second place	2008 Beijing	K-2 500 m
Bronze medal – third place	2000 Sydney	K-2 500 m

World Championships
Gold medal – first place	2001 Poznań	K-2 500 m
Gold medal – first place	2002 Seville	K-2 500 m
Gold medal – first place	2003 Gainesville	K-2 500 m
Gold medal – first place	2005 Zagreb	K-2 500 m
Gold medal – first place	2006 Szeged	K-2 200 m
Gold medal – first place	2006 Szeged	K-2 500 m
Gold medal – first place	2007 Duisburg	K-2 500 m
Silver medal – second place	2001 Poznań	K-2 200 m
Silver medal – second place	2007 Duisburg	K-2 200 m
Bronze medal – third place	2002 Seville	K-2 200 m
Bronze medal – third place	2003 Gainesville	K-2 200 m

Tim Wieskötter (born March 12, 1979, in Emsdetten, North Rhine-Westphalia) is a German sprint canoer who has competed since the late 1990s. Competing in three Summer Olympics, he won a complete set of medals in the K-2 500 m event (gold: 2004, silver: 2008, bronze: 2000) with Ronald Rauhe.

Since their initial pairing in 2000, they have completely dominated the event, winning the major race of the season every year which also includes six world championships (2001, 2002, 2003, 2005, 2006 and 2007). They have also won seven consecutive European gold medals. In addition, Rauhe and Wieskötter hold the K-2 500 m world record of 1:26.971 (Szeged, 2002).

In 2006 Rauhe and Wieskötter doubled up for the first time, defending their K-2 500 m titles and also adding the K-2 200 m gold medals at both the European and World Championships.
