= Canoeing at the 1996 Summer Olympics =

Canoeing at the Games of the XXVI Olympiad
- No. of events: 16

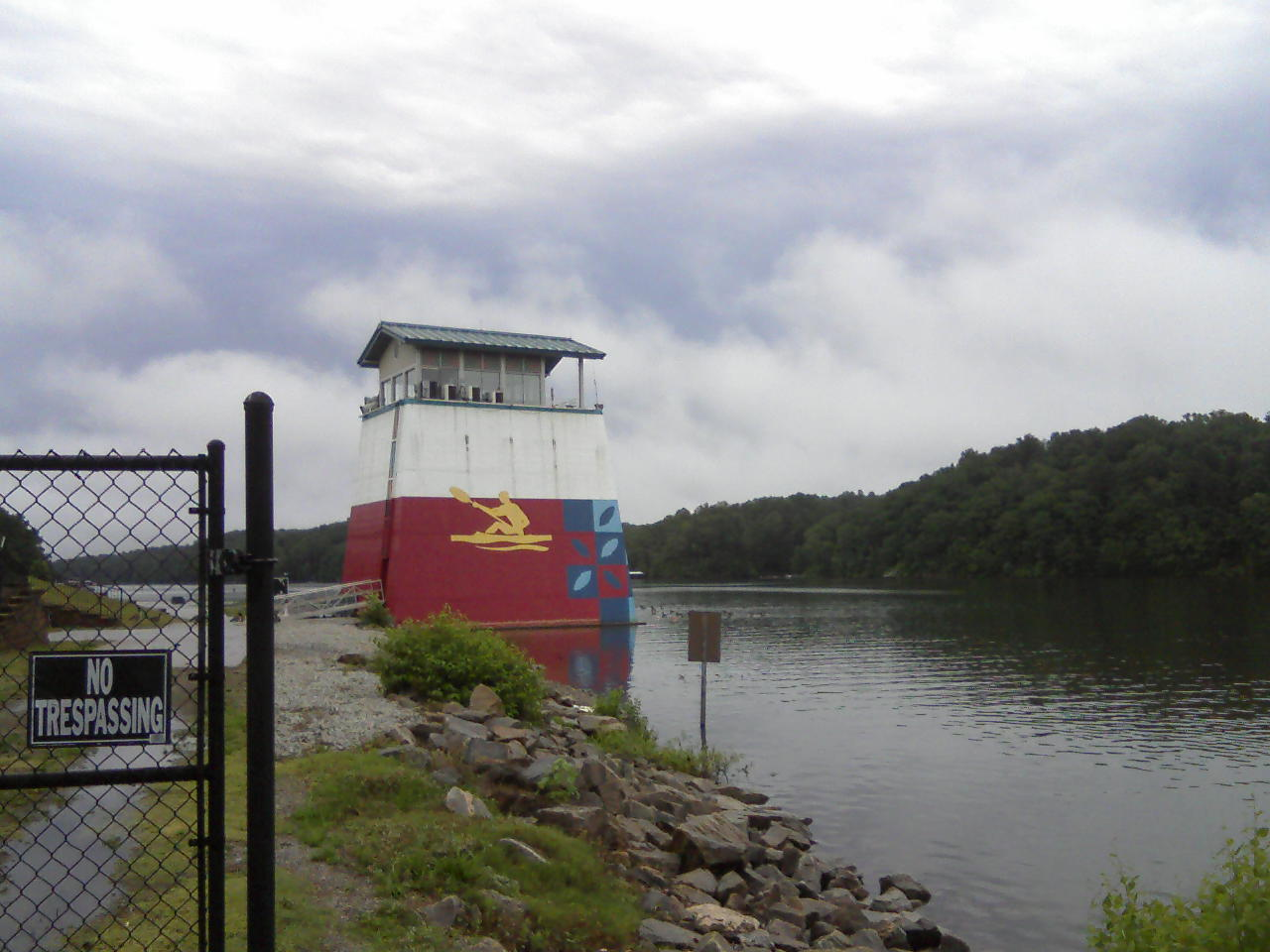
2010 picture of the finish tower at Lake Lanier where the canoe sprint and rowing competitions for the 1996 Summer Olympics took place.

The canoeing competition at the 1996 Summer Olympics in Atlanta, United States was composed of 16 events in two disciplines, slalom and sprint. Timing in 1/1000ths of a second began at these games for the sprint events.

== Medal table ==
Rank	Nation	Gold	Silver	Bronze	Total
1	Germany	5	2	2	9
2	Czech Republic	3	2	0	5
3	Italy	2	2	1	5
4	Hungary	2	1	3	6
5	Norway	1	1	0	2
5	Slovakia	1	1	0	2
7	France	1	0	2	3
8	Sweden	1	0	1	2
9	Romania	0	1	1	2
10	Canada	0	1	0	1
10	Latvia	0	1	0	1
10	Moldova	0	1	0	1
10	Slovenia	0	1	0	1
10	Switzerland	0	1	0	1
10	United States	0	1	0	1
16	Australia	0	0	3	3
17	Bulgaria	0	0	1	1
17	Poland	0	0	1	1
17	Russia	0	0	1	1
Totals (19 entries)		16	16	16	48

== Medal summary ==
=== Slalom ===
Slalom events took place at Ocoee Whitewater Center near Ducktown, Tennessee.

Games	Gold	Silver	Bronze
Men's C-1	Michal Martikán; Slovakia	Lukáš Pollert; Czech Republic	Patrice Estanguet; France
Men's C-2	Frank Adisson and Wilfrid Forgues (FRA)	Jiří Rohan and Miroslav Šimek (CZE)	André Ehrenberg and Michael Senft (GER)
Men's K-1	Oliver Fix; Germany	Andraž Vehovar; Slovenia	Thomas Becker; Germany
Women's K-1	Štěpánka Hilgertová; Czech Republic	Dana Chladek; United States	Myriam Fox-Jerusalmi; France

=== Sprint ===
Sprint events were held at Lake Lanier, Georgia.

==== Men's events ====
Games	Gold	Silver	Bronze
C-1 500 metres	Martin Doktor; Czech Republic	Slavomír Kňazovický; Slovakia	Imre Pulai; Hungary
C-1 1000 metres	Martin Doktor; Czech Republic	Ivans Klementjevs; Latvia	György Zala; Hungary
C-2 500 metres	Hungary; György Kolonics; Csaba Horváth	Moldova; Viktor Reneysky; Nicolae Juravschi	Romania; Gheorghe Andriev; Grigore Obreja
C-2 1000 metres	Germany; Andreas Dittmer; Gunar Kirchbach	Romania; Marcel Glăvan; Antonel Borșan	Hungary; Csaba Horváth; György Kolonics
K-1 500 metres	Antonio Rossi; Italy	Knut Holmann; Norway	Piotr Markiewicz; Poland
K-1 1000 metres	Knut Holmann; Norway	Beniamino Bonomi; Italy	Clint Robinson; Australia
K-2 500 metres	Germany; Kay Bluhm; Torsten Gutsche	Italy; Beniamino Bonomi; Daniele Scarpa	Australia; Daniel Collins; Andrew Trim
K-2 1000 metres	Italy; Antonio Rossi; Daniele Scarpa	Germany; Kay Bluhm; Torsten Gutsche	Bulgaria; Andrian Dushev; Milko Kazanov
K-4 1000 metres	Germany; Thomas Reineck; Olaf Winter; Detlef Hofmann; Mark Zabel	Hungary; András Rajna; Gábor Horváth; Ferenc Csipes; Attila Adrovicz	Russia; Oleg Gorobiy; Sergey Verlin; Georgiy Tsybulnikov; Anatoli Tishchenko

==== Women's events ====
Games	Gold	Silver	Bronze
K-1 500 metres	Rita Kőbán; Hungary	Caroline Brunet; Canada	Josefa Idem; Italy
K-2 500 metres	Sweden; Agneta Andersson; Susanne Gunnarsson	Germany; Birgit Fischer; Ramona Portwich	Australia; Anna Wood; Katrin Borchert
K-4 500 metres	Germany; Anett Schuck; Birgit Fischer; Manuela Mucke; Ramona Portwich	Switzerland; Gabi Müller; Ingrid Haralamow; Sabine Eichenberger; Daniela Baumer	Sweden; Susanne Rosenqvist; Anna Olsson; Ingela Ericsson; Agneta Andersson
