= Canoeing at the 2004 Summer Olympics – Men's K-2 500 metres =

These are the results of the men's K-2 500 metres competition in canoeing at the 2004 Summer Olympics. The K-2 event is raced by two-man canoe sprint kayaks.

== Medalists ==
| Gold | Silver | Bronze |
| Ronald Rauhe and Tim Wieskötter (GER) | Clint Robinson and Nathan Baggaley (AUS) | Raman Piatrushenka and Vadzim Makhneu (BLR) |

== Heats ==
The 19 teams first raced in three heats. The top finisher in each heat moved directly to the final, and all other teams advanced to the semifinals. No teams were eliminated in the heats. The heats were raced on August 24.

| Heat | Place | Athlete | Country | Time | Notes |
|---|---|---|---|---|---|
| 1 | 1 | Ronald Rauhe and Tim Wieskötter | Germany | 1:28.866 | QF |
| 1 | 2 | Zoltán Kammerer and Botond Storcz | Hungary | 1:31.166 | QS |
| 1 | 3 | Damian Vindel and Francisco Llera | Spain | 1:32.846 | QS |
| 1 | 4 | Yordan Yordanov and Ivan Hristov | Bulgaria | 1:33.222 | QS |
| 1 | 5 | Lasse Nielsen and Mads Kongsgaard Madsen | Denmark | 1:33.938 | QS |
| 1 | 6 | Marian Baban and Stefan Vasile | Romania | 1:34.410 | QS |
| 1 | 7 | Aleksey Babadjanov and Sergey Borzov | Uzbekistan | 1:34.782 | QS |
| 2 | 1 | Raman Piatrushenka and Vadzim Makhneu | Belarus | 1:28.925 | QF |
| 2 | 2 | Markus Oscarsson and Henrik Nilsson | Sweden | 1:29.717 | QS |
| 2 | 3 | Anatoli Tishchenko and Vladimir Grushikhin | Russia | 1:30.761 | QS |
| 2 | 4 | Clint Robinson and Nathan Baggaley | Australia | 1:30.869 | QS |
| 2 | 5 | Antonio Rossi and Beniamino Bonomi | Italy | 1:33.565 | QS |
| 2 | 6 | Yin Yijun and Wang Lei | China | 1:37.061 | QS |
| 3 | 1 | Marek Twardowski and Adam Wysocki | Poland | 1:29.069 | QF |
| 3 | 2 | Alvydas Duonėla and Egidijus Balčiūnas | Lithuania | 1:30.521 | QS |
| 3 | 3 | Ognjen Filipović and Dragan Zorić | Serbia and Montenegro | 1:30.665 | QS |
| 3 | 4 | Bartosz Wolski and Rami Zur | United States | 1:31.893 | QS |
| 3 | 5 | Steven Jorens and Richard Dober | Canada | 1:31.985 | QS |
| 3 | 6 | Sebastian Cuattrin and Sebastian Szubski | Brazil | 1:35.917 | QS |

== Semifinals ==
The top three finishers in each of the two semifinal races qualified for the final. Fourth place and higher teams were eliminated. The semifinals were raced on August 26.

Semifinal 1
| 1. | Zoltán Kammerer and Botond Storcz (HUN) | 1:30.438 | QF |
| 2. | Anatoli Tishchenko and Vladimir Grushikhin (RUS) | 1:31.786 | QF |
| 3. | Antonio Rossi and Beniamino Bonomi (ITA) | 1:31.830 | QF |
| 4. | Ognjen Filipović and Dragan Zorić (SCG) | 1:32.150 |
| 5. | Yordan Yordanov and Ivan Hristov (BUL) | 1:33.182 |
| 6. | Bartosz Wolski and Rami Zur (USA) | 1:33.482 |
| 7. | Marian Baban and Stefan Vasile (ROU) | 1:34.398 |
| 8. | Sebastian Cuattrin and Sebastian Szubski (BRA) | 1:37.466 |
Semifinal 2
| 1. | Alvydas Duonėla and Egidijus Balčiūnas (LTU) | 1:30.270 | QF |
| 2. | Clint Robinson and Nathan Baggaley (AUS) | 1:30.710 | QF |
| 3. | Damian Vindel and Francisco Llera (ESP) | 1:30.998 | QF |
| 4. | Markus Oscarsson and Henrik Nilsson (SWE) | 1:31.030 |
| 5. | Lasse Nielsen and Mads Kongsgaard Madsen (DEN) | 1:33.482 |
| 6. | Aleksey Babadjanov and Sergey Borzov (UZB) | 1:33.654 |
| 7. | Steven Jorens and Richard Dober (CAN) | 1:34.318 |
| 8. | Yin Yijun and Wang Lei (CHN) | 1:38.554 |

== Final ==
The final was raced on August 28.

| Gold | Ronald Rauhe and Tim Wieskötter (GER) | 1:27.040 |
| Silver | Clint Robinson and Nathan Baggaley (AUS) | 1:27.920 |
| Bronze | Raman Piatrushenka and Vadzim Makhneu (BLR) | 1:27.996 |
| 4. | Marek Twardowski and Adam Wysocki (POL) | 1:28.048 |
| 5. | Zoltán Kammerer and Botond Storcz (HUN) | 1:29.096 |
| 6. | Damian Vindel and Francisco Llera (ESP) | 1:29.532 |
| 7. | Alvydas Duonėla and Egidijus Balčiūnas (LTU) | 1:29.868 |
| 8. | Antonio Rossi and Beniamino Bonomi (ITA) | 1:30.804 |
| 9. | Anatoli Tishchenko and Vladimir Grushikhin (RUS) | 1:31.048 |
