= Canoeing at the 1996 Summer Olympics – Men's K-4 1000 metres =

Men's K-4 1000 metres at the Games of the XXVI Olympiad
- Venue: Lake Lanier
- Dates: 30 July 1996 (heats); 1 August 1996 (semifinals); 3 August 1996 (final)
- Competitors: 16 boats from 16 nations
- Winning time: 2:51.528

Medalists
| 1st place, gold medalist(s) | | Detlef Hofmann; Olaf Winter; Thomas Reineck; Mark Zabel | Germany |
| 2nd place, silver medalist(s) | | Attila Adrovicz; Ferenc Csipes; Gábor Horváth; András Rajna | Hungary |
| 3rd place, bronze medalist(s) | | Sergey Verlin; Oleg Goroby; Anatoly Tishchenko; Georgy Tsybulnikov | Russia |

The men's K-4 1000 metres event was a fours kayaking event conducted as part of the Canoeing at the 1996 Summer Olympics program.

== Medalists ==
| Gold | Silver | Bronze |
| Germany; Thomas Reineck; Olaf Winter; Detlef Hofmann; Mark Zabel | Hungary; András Rajna; Gábor Horváth; Ferenc Csipes; Attila Adrovicz | Russia; Oleg Gorobiy; Sergey Verlin; Georgiy Tsybulnikov; Anatoli Tishchenko |

== Results ==
=== Heats ===
16 crews entered in two heats. The top two finishers in each heat advanced to the final while the remaining teams competed in the repechages.

Heat 1
| 1. | Thomas Reineck, Mark Zabel, Detlef Hofmann, and Olaf Winter (GER) | 3:07.908 | QF |
| 2. | Anatoli Tishchenko, Oleg Gorobiy, Sergey Verlin, and Georgiy Tsybulnikov (RUS) | 3:11.128 | QF |
| 3. | James Walker, Paul Lynch, Brian Morton, and Ramon Andersson (AUS) | 3:11.752 | QS |
| 4. | Miguel García, Jovino González, Emilio Merchán, and Gregorio Vicente (ESP) | 3:14.224 | QS |
| 5. | Mihai Apostol, Renn Crichlow, Peter Giles, and Liam Jewell (CAN) | 3:15.208 | QS |
| 6. | Andrea Covi, Enrico Lupetti, Ivano Lussignoli, and Luca Negri (ITA) | 3:17.144 | QS |
| 7. | Karel Leština, Pavel Mráz, Martin Otáhal, and Jiří Polívka (CZE) | 3:19.868 | QS |
| 8. | Curt Bader, Philippe Boccara, Mark Hamilton, and Cliff Meidl (USA) | 3:23.352 | QS |
Heat 2
| 1. | Ferenc Csipes, Gábor Horváth, Attila Adrovicz, and András Rajna (HUN) | 3:07.517 | QF |
| 2. | Grzegorz Kaleta, Piotr Markiewicz, Marek Witowski, and Adam Wysocki (POL) | 3:10.625 | QF |
| 3. | Petar Karadzhov, Petar Merkov, Nikolay Yordanov, and Georgi Choykov (BUL) | 3:13.165 | QS |
| 4. | Paw Madsen, Mattias Oscarsson, Henrik Nilsson, and Jonas Fager (SWE) | 3:13.809 | QS |
| 5. | Ilfat Gatyatullin, Dmitry Torlopov, Andrey Safaryan, and Sergey Skrypnik (KAZ) | 3:15.493 | QS |
| 6. | V'iacheslav Kulida, Olesksiy Slivinsky, Andriy Borzukov, and Andriy Petrov (UKR) | 3:16.297 | QS |
| 7. | Morten Ivarsen, Mattis Næss, Tom Selvik, and Thomas Roander (NOR) | 3:17.021 | QS |
| 8. | Vladimir Kazantsev, Konstantin Yashin, Anatoly Tyurin, and Andrey Shilin (UZB) | 3:27.133 | QS |

=== Semifinals ===
The top two finishers in the each semifinal and the fastest third-place finisher advanced to the final.

Semifinal 1
| 1. | Miguel García, Jovino González, Emilio Merchán, and Gregorio Vicente (ESP) | 3:00.799 | QF |
| 2. | Mihai Apostol, Renn Crichlow, Peter Giles, and Liam Jewell (CAN) | 3:01.307 | QF |
| 3. | Petar Karadzhov, Petar Merkov, Nikolay Yordanov, and Georgi Choykov (BUL) | 3:01.427 | QF |
| 4. | V'iacheslav Kulida, Olesksiy Slivinsky, Andriy Borzukov, and Andriy Petrov (UKR) | 3:05.643 |
| 5. | Karel Leština, Pavel Mráz, Martin Otáhal, and Jiří Polívka (CZE) | 3:06.611 |
| 6. | Curt Bader, Philippe Boccara, Mark Hamilton, and Cliff Meidl (USA) | 3:06.855 |
Semifinal 2
| 1. | James Walker, Paul Lynch, Brian Morton, and Ramon Andersson (AUS) | 3:01.806 | QF |
| 2. | Paw Madsen, Mattias Oscarsson, Henrik Nilsson, and Jonas Fager (SWE) | 3:02.202 | QF |
| 3. | Andrea Covi, Enrico Lupetti, Ivano Lussignoli, and Luca Negri (ITA) | 3:03.218 |
| 4. | Morten Ivarsen, Mattis Næss, Tom Selvik, and Thomas Roander (NOR) | 3:03.870 |
| 5. | Ilfat Gatyatullin, Dmitry Torlopov, Andrey Safaryan, and Sergey Skrypnik (KAZ) | 3:06.850 |
| 6. | Vladimir Kazantsev, Konstantin Yashin, Anatoly Tyurin, and Andrey Shilin (UZB) | 3:11.146 |

=== Final ===
The final was held on August 3.

| Gold | Thomas Reineck, Mark Zabel, Detlef Hofmann, and Olaf Winter (GER) | 2:51.528 |
| Silver | Ferenc Csipes, Gábor Horváth, Attila Adrovicz, and András Rajna (HUN) | 2:53.184 |
| Bronze | Anatoli Tishchenko, Oleg Gorobiy, Sergey Verlin, and Georgiy Tsybulnikov (RUS) | 2:53.996 |
| 4. | Grzegorz Kaleta, Piotr Markiewicz, Marek Witowski, and Adam Wysocki (POL) | 2:54.772 |
| 5. | Miguel García, Jovino González, Emilio Merchán, and Gregorio Vicente (ESP) | 2:55.884 |
| 6. | Paw Madsen, Mattias Oscarsson, Henrik Nilsson, and Jonas Fager (SWE) | 2:55.908 |
| 7. | Mihai Apostol, Renn Crichlow, Peter Giles, and Liam Jewell (CAN) | 2:56.664 |
| 8. | Petar Karadzhov, Petar Merkov, Nikolay Yordanov, and Georgi Choykov (BUL) | 2:56.696 |
| 9. | James Walker, Paul Lynch, Brian Morton, and Ramon Andersson (AUS) | 2:57.560 |

Germany stayed close to Hungary for the first 750 meters of the race before pulling away to win decisively.
