= Canoeing at the 1996 Summer Olympics – Men's K-1 500 metres =

Men's K-1 500 metres at the Games of the XXVI Olympiad
- Venue: Lake Lanier
- Dates: 31 July 1996 (heats & repechage); 2 August 1996 (semifinals); 4 August 1996 (final)
- Competitors: 26 from 26 nations
- Winning time: 1:37.423

Medalists
1st place, gold medalist(s)		Antonio Rossi	Italy
2nd place, silver medalist(s)		Knut Holmann	Norway
3rd place, bronze medalist(s)		Piotr Markiewicz	Poland

The men's K-1 500 metres event was an individual kayaking event conducted as part of the Canoeing at the 1996 Summer Olympics program that took place at Lake Lanier.

== Medalists ==
Gold	Silver	Bronze
Antonio Rossi (ITA)	Knut Holmann (NOR)	Piotr Markiewicz (POL)

== Results ==
=== Heats ===
26 competitors first raced in three heats. The top three finishers from each of the heats advanced directly to the semifinals with the rest competing in the repechages.

Heat 1
1.	Geza Magyar (ROU)	1:42.391	QS
2.	Piotr Markiewicz (POL)	1:42.731	QS
3.	Sergey Kaleshink (BLR)	1:43.279	QS
4.	Zoltán Antal (HUN)	1:43.343	QR
5.	Róbert Erban (SVK)	1:43.563	QR
6.	Yevgeny Yegorov (KAZ)	1:47.823	QR
7.	Ivan Lawler (GBR)	1:48.991	QR
8.	Tom Krantz (SWE)	1:49.695	QR
Heat 2
1.	Knut Holmann (NOR)	1:41.624	QS
2.	Cameron McFadezan (AUS)	1:42.160	QS
3.	Miguel García (ESP)	1:42.180	QS
4.	Renn Crichlow (CAN)	1:42.652	QR
5.	Sebastián Cuattrin (BRA)	1:44.328	QR
6.	Sergey Verlin (RUS)	1:45.328	QR
7.	Hain Helde (EST)	1:47.316	QR
8.	José Garcia (POR)	1:52.760	QR
9.	Koutoua Abia (CIV)	1:55.208	QR
Heat 3
1.	Antonio Rossi (ITA)	1:40.411	QS
2.	Lutz Liwowski (GER)	1:41.079	QS
3.	Mikko Kolehmainen (FIN)	1:41.171	QS
4.	Javier Correa (ARG)	1:42.691	QR
5.	Petar Merkov (BUL)	1:43.810	QR
6.	Mike Herbert (USA)	1:44.763	QR
7.	Vladyslav Tereshchenko (UKR)	1:45.623	QR
8.	Petar Sibinkić (YUG)	1:45.799	QR
9.	Aleksandr Popov (UZB)	1:56.827	QR

=== Repechages ===
The top four finishers from each of the repechages along with the fastest fifth-place finisher advanced to the semifinals.

Repechage 1
1.	Róbert Erban (SVK)	1:43.184	QS
2.	Mike Herbert (USA)	1:43.384	QS
3.	Javier Correa (ARG)	1:44.076	QS
4.	Sebastián Cuattrin (BRA)	1:44.204	QS
5.	Hain Helde (EST)	1:44.340
6.	Ivan Lawler (GBR)	1:45.220
7.	Petar Sibinkić (YUG)	1:46.532
8.	Koutoua Abia (CIV)	1:53.432
Repechage 2
1.	Petar Merkov (BUL)	1:42.851	QS
2.	Renn Crichlow (CAN)	1:43.055	QS
3.	Zoltán Antal (HUN)	1:43.343	QS
4.	Sergey Verlin (RUS)	1:43.359	QS
5.	Vladyslav Tereshchenko (UKR)	1:44.143	QS
6.	Yevgeny Yegorov (KAZ)	1:47.035
7.	Tom Krantz (SWE)	1:47.815
8.	Aleksandr Popov (UZB)	1:51.623
9.	José Garcia (POR)	1:55.103

=== Semifinals ===
The top four finishers in each of the two semifinals along with the fifth fastest advanced to the final.

Semifinal 1
1.	Antonio Rossi (ITA)	1:39.185	QF
2.	Knut Holmann (NOR)	1:39.929	QF
3.	Mikko Kolehmainen (FIN)	1:40.765	QF
4.	Róbert Erban (SVK)	1:41.425	QF
5.	Piotr Markiewicz (POL)	1:41.565	QF
6.	Renn Crichlow (CAN)	1:41.749
7.	Zoltán Antal (HUN)	1:41.873
8.	Sergey Kaleshink (BLR)	1:42.505
9.	Sebastián Cuattrin (BRA)	1:43.045
Semifinal 2
1.	Lutz Liwowski (GER)	1:40.319	QF
2.	Geza Magyar (ROU)	1:40.615	QF
3.	Miguel García (ESP)	1:40.687	QF
4.	Cameron McFadezan (AUS)	1:41.083	QF
5.	Sergey Verlin (RUS)	1:41.791
6.	Vladyslav Tereshchenko (UKR)	1:41.883
7.	Javier Correa (ARG)	1:42.071
8.	Mike Herbert (USA)	1:42.335
9.	Petar Merkov (BUL)	1:42.379

=== Final ===
The final was held on August 4.

Gold	Antonio Rossi (ITA)	1:37.423
Silver	Knut Holmann (NOR)	1:38.339
Bronze	Piotr Markiewicz (POL)	1:38.615
4.	Geza Magyar (ROU)	1:38.975
5.	Lutz Liwowski (GER)	1:39.307
6.	Miguel García (ESP)	1:40.047
7.	Mikko Kolehmainen (FIN)	1:40.331
8.	Róbert Erban (SVK)	1:40.407
9.	Cameron McFadezan (AUS)	1:41.023
