= Canoeing at the 2000 Summer Olympics – Men's K-1 500 metres =

The men's K-1 500 metres event was an individual kayaking event conducted as part of the Canoeing at the 2000 Summer Olympics program.

== Medalists ==
Gold	Silver	Bronze
Knut Holmann (NOR)	Petar Merkov (BUL)	Michael Kolganov (ISR)

== Results ==
=== Heats ===
31 competitors first raced in four heats. The top six finishers from each of the heats and the three fastest finishers advanced directly to the semifinals.

Heat 1 of 4 Date: Wednesday 27 September 2000
Place	Overall	Athlete	Nation	Time	Qual.
1	10	Ákos Vereckei	Hungary	1:42.089	QS
2	16	Ian Wynne	Great Britain	1:42.779	QS
3	18	Ognjen Filipović	FR Yugoslavia	1:43.097	QS
4	19	Róbert Erban	Slovakia	1:43.109	QS
5	20	Antonio Scaduto	Italy	1:43.289	QS
6	21	Anders Svensson	Sweden	1:43.349	QS
7	22	Alvydas Duonėla	Lithuania	1:43.877	QS
8	31	Roger Caumo	Brazil	1:49.955	

Heat 2 of 4 Date: Wednesday 27 September 2000
Place	Overall	Athlete	Nation	Time	Qual.
1	2	Petar Merkov	Bulgaria	1:40.227	QS
2	3	Michael Kolganov	Israel	1:40.275	QS
3	4	Jovino González	Spain	1:40.761	QS
4	6	Lutz Liwowski	Germany	1:41.091	QS
5	8	Alan van Coller	South Africa	1:41.805	QS
6	24	Pavel Hottmar	Czech Republic	1:44.391	QS
7	28	Sergey Sergin	Kazakhstan	1:47.253	

Heat 3 of 4 Date: Wednesday 27 September 2000
Place	Overall	Athlete	Nation	Time	Qual.
1	1	Grzegorz Kotowicz	Poland	1:40.204	QS
2	5	Knut Holmann	Norway	1:40.990	QS
3	9	Nathan Baggaley	Australia	1:41.854	QS
4	11	Vladimir Grushikhin	Armenia	1:42.430	QS
5	13	Mihai Apostol	Canada	1:42.562	QS
6	14	Anton Ryakhov	Uzbekistan	1:42.694	QS
7	17	Hain Helde	Estonia	1:42.772	QS
8	29	Nader Eivazi	Iran	1:49.306	

Heat 4 of 4 Date: Wednesday 27 September 2000
Place	Overall	Athlete	Nation	Time	Qual.
1	7	Javier Correa	Argentina	1:41.557	QS
2	12	Kimmo Latvamäki	Finland	1:42.535	QS
3	15	Geza Magyar	Romania	1:42.733	QS
4	23	Stein Jorgensen	United States	1:44.185	QS
5	25	Anatoli Tishchenko	Russia	1:44.707	QS
6	26	Nam Sung-Ho	South Korea	1:45.163	QS
7	27	Adrian Bachmann	Switzerland	1:45.187	QS
8	30	Gary Mawer	Ireland	1:49.705	

Overall Results Heats

Heats Overall Results
Place	Athlete	Nation	Heat	Place	Time	Qual.
1	Grzegorz Kotowicz	Poland	3	1	1:40.204	QS
2	Petar Merkov	Bulgaria	2	1	1:40.227	QS
3	Michael Kolganov	Israel	2	2	1:40.275	QS
4	Jovino González	Spain	2	3	1:40.761	QS
5	Knut Holmann	Norway	3	2	1:40.990	QS
6	Lutz Liwowski	Germany	2	4	1:41.091	QS
7	Javier Correa	Argentina	4	1	1:41.557	QS
8	Alan van Coller	South Africa	2	5	1:41.805	QS
9	Nathan Baggaley	Australia	3	3	1:41.854	QS
10	Ákos Vereckei	Hungary	1	1	1:42.089	QS
11	Vladimir Grushikhin	Armenia	3	4	1:42.430	QS
12	Kimmo Latvamäki	Finland	4	2	1:42.535	QS
13	Mihai Apostol	Canada	3	5	1:42.562	QS
14	Anton Ryakhov	Uzbekistan	3	6	1:42.694	QS
15	Geza Magyar	Romania	4	3	1:42.733	QS
16	Ian Wynne	Great Britain	1	2	1:42.779	QS
17	Hain Helde	Estonia	3	7	1:42.772	QS
18	Ognjen Filipović	FR Yugoslavia	1	3	1:43.097	QS
19	Róbert Erban	Slovakia	1	4	1:43.109	QS
20	Antonio Scaduto	Italy	1	5	1:43.289	QS
21	Anders Svensson	Sweden	1	6	1:43.349	QS
22	Alvydas Duonėla	Lithuania	1	7	1:43.877	QS
23	Stein Jorgensen	United States	4	4	1:44.185	QS
24	Pavel Hottmar	Czech Republic	2	6	1:44.391	QS
25	Anatoli Tishchenko	Russia	4	5	1:44.707	QS
26	Nam Sung-Ho	South Korea	4	6	1:45.163	QS
27	Adrian Bachmann	Switzerland	4	7	1:45.187	QS
28	Sergey Sergin	Kazakhstan	2	7	1:47.253	
29	Nader Eivazi	Iran	3	8	1:49.306	
30	Gary Mawer	Ireland	4	8	1:49.705	
31	Roger Caumo	Brazil	1	8	1:49.955	

=== Semifinals ===
The top three finishers in each of the three semifinals advanced to the final.

Heat 1 of 3 Date: Friday 29 September 2000
Place	Overall	Athlete	Nation	Time	Qual.
1	1	Ákos Vereckei	Hungary	1:39.574	QF
2	2	Knut Holmann	Norway	1:39.964	QF
3	5	Michael Kolganov	Israel	1:40.426	QF
4	11	Geza Magyar	Romania	1:41.482	
5	14	Pavel Hottmar	Czech Republic	1:41.920	
6	20	Antonio Scaduto	Italy	1:43.432	
7	22	Mihai Apostol	Canada	1:43.444	
8	23	Stein Jorgensen	United States	1:44.182	
9	25	Hain Helde	Estonia	1:45.916	

Heat Heat 2 of 3 Date: Friday 29 September 2000
Place	Overall	Athlete	Nation	Time	Qual.
1	3	Petar Merkov	Bulgaria	1:40.008	QF
2	4	Alvydas Duonėla	Lithuania	1:40.368	QF
3	7	Alan van Coller	South Africa	1:40.656	QF
4	8	Nathan Baggaley	Australia	1:40.884	
5	13	Kimmo Latvamäki	Finland	1:41.640	
6	15	Róbert Erban	Slovakia	1:42.300	
7	21	Ognjen Filipović	FR Yugoslavia	1:43.434	
8	26	Nam Sung-Ho	South Korea	1:46.008	
		Vladimir Grushikhin	Armenia	DISQ	

Gurshikhin's disqualification was not disclosed in the official report.

Heat 3 of 3 Date: Friday 29 September 2000
Place	Overall	Athlete	Nation	Time	Qual.
1	6	Lutz Liwowski	Germany	1:40.586	QF
2	9	Jovino González	Spain	1:41.168	QF
3	10	Grzegorz Kotowicz	Poland	1:41.198	QF
4	12	Ian Wynne	Great Britain	1:41.485	
5	16	Anatoli Tishchenko	Russia	1:42.548	
6	17	Javier Correa	Argentina	1:42.784	
7	18	Anders Svensson	Sweden	1:43.070	
8	19	Anton Ryakhov	Uzbekistan	1:43.292	
9	24	Adrian Bachmann	Switzerland	1:45.866	

Overall Results Semi-Finals

Semi-Finals Overall Results
Place	Athlete	Nation	Heat	Place	Time	Qual.
1	Ákos Vereckei	Hungary	1	1	1:39.574	QF
2	Knut Holmann	Norway	1	2	1:39.964	QF
3	Petar Merkov	Bulgaria	2	1	1:40.008	QF
4	Alvydas Duonėla	Lithuania	2	2	1:40.368	QF
5	Michael Kolganov	Israel	1	3	1:40.426	QF
6	Lutz Liwowski	Germany	3	1	1:40.586	QF
7	Alan van Coller	South Africa	2	3	1:40.656	QF
8	Nathan Baggaley	Australia	2	4	1:40.884	
9	Jovino González	Spain	3	2	1:41.168	QF
10	Grzegorz Kotowicz	Poland	3	3	1:41.198	QF
11	Geza Magyar	Romania	1	4	1:41.482	
12	Ian Wynne	Great Britain	3	4	1:41.485	
13	Kimmo Latvamäki	Finland	2	5	1:41.640	
14	Pavel Hottmar	Czech Republic	1	5	1:41.920	
15	Róbert Erban	Slovakia	2	6	1:42.300	
16	Anatoli Tishchenko	Russia	3	5	1:42.548	
17	Javier Correa	Argentina	3	6	1:42.784	
18	Anders Svensson	Sweden	3	7	1:43.070	
19	Anton Ryakhov	Uzbekistan	3	8	1:43.292	
20	Antonio Scaduto	Italy	1	6	1:43.432	
21	Ognjen Filipović	FR Yugoslavia	2	7	1:43.434	
22	Mihai Apostol	Canada	1	7	1:43.444	
23	Stein Jorgensen	United States	1	8	1:44.182	
24	Adrian Bachmann	Switzerland	3	9	1:45.866	
25	Hain Helde	Estonia	1	9	1:45.916	
26	Nam Sung-Ho	South Korea	2	8	1:46.008	
	Vladimir Grushikhin	Armenia	2		DISQ	

=== Final ===
Final Date: Sunday 1 October 2000
Place	Athlete	Nation	Time
1st place, gold medalist(s)	Knut Holmann	Norway	1:57.847
2nd place, silver medalist(s)	Petar Merkov	Bulgaria	1:58.393
3rd place, bronze medalist(s)	Michael Kolganov	Israel	1:59.563
4	Ákos Vereckei	Hungary	2:00.145
5	Lutz Liwowski	Germany	2:00.259
6	Jovino González	Spain	2:03.889
7	Alvydas Duonėla	Lithuania	2:04.591
8	Alan van Coller	South Africa	2:04.981
9	Grzegorz Kotowicz	Poland	2:07.711

The final was delayed six hours to strong winds of 50 mph (80 km/h), a race official sinking in his aluminum dinghy, start lanes for lanes seven and eight being broken prior to the start, and 30 spectators stripping to their underwear to swim to the medal podium only to be taken into custody by police and security personnel. Except for Kolganov edging pre-Olympic favorite Vereckei at the line, the race itself was generally uneventful.
