= Vindel =

Vindel may refer to:

- Vindel, Cuenca, municipality in Cuenca, Spain
- Vindel River, river in Sweden
- Damián Vindel (born 1981), Spanish sprint canoeist
- Lorena Vindel (born 1977), Honduran actress and artist
