= Georgiy Tsybulnikov =

Russian canoeist

Medal record

Men's canoe sprint

Olympic Games
Bronze medal – third place	1996 Atlanta	K-4 1000 m

World Championships
Bronze medal – third place	1998 Szeged	K-4 1000 m

Georgiy Tsybulnikov (born November 21, 1966) is a Russian sprint canoer who competed in the 1990s. He won a bronze medal in the K-4 1000 m event at the 1996 Summer Olympics in Atlanta, together with teammates Oleg Gorobiy, Sergey Verlin and Anatoli Tishchenko.

Tsybulnikov also won a bronze medal in the K-4 1000 m event at the 1998 ICF Canoe Sprint World Championships in Szeged.
