= Szubski =

Szubski is a Polish surname. Notable people with the surname include:

- Sebastian Szubski (born 1981), Brazilian canoeist
- Zdzisław Szubski (born 1958), Polish canoeist
