= 1997 ICF Canoe Sprint World Championships =

Canoeing tournament held in Canada

- Host city: Dartmouth, Nova Scotia, Canada on Lake Banook

The 1997 ICF Canoe Sprint World Championships were held in Dartmouth, Nova Scotia, Canada on Lake Banook.

The men's competition consisted of nine Canadian (single paddle, open boat) and nine kayak events. Eight events were held for the women, all in kayak. Women's K-1 1000 m and K-2 1000 m events were added.

This was the 28th championships in canoe sprint.

== Medal summary ==
=== Men's ===
==== Canoe ====
Event	Gold	Time	Silver	Time	Bronze	Time
C-1 200 m	Béla Belicza (HUN)		Martin Doktor (CZE)		Michał Śliwiński (UKR)	
C-1 500 m	Martin Doktor (CZE)		Béla Belicza (HUN)		Michał Śliwiński (UKR)	
C-1 1000 m	Andreas Dittmer (GER)		Martin Doktor (CZE)		Béla Belicza (HUN)	
C-2 200 m	Germany; Thomas Zereske; Christian Gille		Russia; Pavel Konovalov; Vladimir Ladosha		Czech Republic; Petr Fuksa; Pavel Bednář	
C-2 500 m	Hungary; György Kolonics; Csaba Horváth		Poland; Daniel Jędraszko; Paweł Baraszkiewicz		Germany; Thomas Zereske; Christian Gille	
C-2 1000 m	Germany; Gunar Kirchbach; Matthias Röder		Hungary; György Kolonics; Csaba Horváth		Great Britain; Andrew Train; Stephen Train	
C-4 200 m	Belarus; Aleksandr Masseykov; Andrey Beliayev; Anatoliy Reneiskiy; Vladimir Marinov		Hungary; György Kolonics; Csaba Horváth; Ervin Hoffmann; Béla Belicza		Czech Republic; Petr Procházka; Tomáš Křivánek; Petr Fuksa; Pavel Bednář	
C-4 500 m	Hungary; György Kolonics; Csaba Horváth; Csaba Hüttner; László Szuszkó		Romania; Marcel Glăvan; Cosmin Pașca; Antonel Borșan; Florin Popescu		Russia; Sergey Chemerov; Andrey Kabanov; Vladislav Polzounov; Aleksandr Kostoglod	
C-4 1000 m	Romania; Marcel Glăvan; Cosmin Pașca; Antonel Borșan; Florin Popescu		Russia; Konstantin Formichev; Maksim Opalev; Vladislav Polzounov; Aleksandr Kostoglod		Poland; Daniel Jędraszko; Piotr Midloch; Paweł Midloch; Paweł Baraszkiewicz	

==== Kayak ====
Event	Gold	Time	Silver	Time	Bronze	Time
K-1 200 m	Vince Fehérvári (HUN)		Grzegorz Kotowicz (POL)		Oleksiy Slivinskiy (UKR)	
K-1 500 m	Botond Storcz (HUN)		Grzegorz Kotowicz (POL)		Antonio Rossi (ITA)	
K-1 1000 m	Botond Storcz (HUN)		Beniamino Bonomi (ITA)		Knut Holmann (NOR)	
K-2 200 m	Hungary; Vince Fehérvári; Róbert Hegedűs		Italy; Beniamino Bonomi; Paolo Tommasini		Sweden; Henrik Andersson; Henrik Nilsson	
K-2 500 m	Australia; Andrew Trim; Daniel Collins		Italy; Beniamino Bonomi; Luca Negri		Hungary; Krisztián Bártfai; Gábor Horvárth	
K-2 1000 m	Italy; Antonio Rossi; Luca Negri		Denmark; Jesper Staal; Thomas Holm Jakobsen		Poland; Grzegorz Kotowicz; Dariusz Białkowski	
K-4 200 m	Russia; Anatoly Tishchenko; Oleg Gorobiy; Sergey Verlin; Aleksandr Ivanik		Hungary; Vince Fehérvári; Krisztián Bártfai; Gábor Horvárth; Róbert Hegedűs		Germany; Torsten Gutsche; Mark Zabel; Jan Günther; Björn Bach	
K-4 500 m	Hungary; Zoltán Kammerer; Botond Storcz; Ákos Vereckei; Róbert Hegedűs		Germany; Torsten Gutsche; Mark Zabel; Jan Günther; Björn Bach		Sweden; Henrik Andersson; Nils-Erik Jonsson; Anders Svensson; Henrik Nilsson	
K-4 1000 m	Germany; Torsten Gustche; Mark Zabel; Björn Bach; Stefan Ulm		Hungary; Botond Storcz; Zoltán Antal; Gábor Szabó; Márton Bauer		Australia; Ross Chaffer; Brian Marton; Peter Scott; Adam Dean	

=== Women's ===
==== Kayak ====
Event	Gold	Time	Silver	Time	Bronze	Time
K-1 200 m	Caroline Brunet (CAN)		Josefa Idem (ITA)		Jacqui Mengler (AUS)	
K-1 500 m	Caroline Brunet (CAN)		Josefa Idem (ITA)		Ursula Profanter (AUT)	
K-1 1000 m	Caroline Brunet (CAN)		Josefa Idem (ITA)		Ursula Profanter (AUT)	
K-2 200 m	Germany; Birgit Fischer; Anett Schuck		Poland; Isabella Dylewska; Elżbieta Urbańczyk		Russia; Natalya Gouilly; Yelena Tissina	
K-2 500 m	Germany; Birgit Fischer; Anett Schuck		Australia; Anna Wood; Katrin Borchert		Spain; Beatriz Manchón; Izaskun Aramburu	
K-2 1000 m	Germany; Birgit Fischer; Marcela Bednar		Australia; Anna Wood; Katrin Borchert		Poland; Isabella Dylewska; Elżbieta Urbańczyk	
K-4 200 m	Germany; Birgit Fischer; Anett Schuck; Manuela Mucke; Katrin Wagner		Canada; Karen Fumeaux; Corrina Kennedy; Danica Rice; Marie-Josée Gibeau		Sweden; Anna Karlsson; Ingela Eriksson; Maria Haglund; Susanne Rosenqvist	
K-4 500 m	Germany; Birgit Fischer; Anett Schuck; Katrin Kieseler; Katrin Wagner		Hungary; Kinga Dékány; Szilvia Szabó; Andrea Barocsi; Katalin Kovács		Spain; Beatriz Manchón; Belen Sánchez; Ana María Penas; Izaskun Aramburu	

== Medals table ==
Rank	Nation	Gold	Silver	Bronze	Total
1	Germany	9	1	2	12
2	Hungary	8	6	2	16
3	Canada	3	1	0	4
4	Italy	1	6	1	8
5	Australia	1	2	2	5
5	Czech Republic	1	2	2	5
5	Russia	1	2	2	5
8	Romania	1	1	0	2
9	Belarus	1	0	0	1
10	Poland	0	4	3	7
11	Denmark	0	1	0	1
12	Sweden	0	0	3	3
12	Ukraine	0	0	3	3
14	Austria	0	0	2	2
14	Spain	0	0	2	2
16	Great Britain	0	0	1	1
16	Norway	0	0	1	1
Totals (17 entries)		26	26	26	78
