= Andrey Petrov (disambiguation) =

Andrey Petrov (1930–2006) was a Russian and Soviet composer.

Andrey Petrov may also refer to:

- Andrei Petrov (actor) (1919–1990), Soviet actor in Adventures of a Dentist
- Andrey Petrov (canoeist) (born 1971), Ukrainian sprint canoer
- Andrey Petrov (athlete) (born 1986), Uzbek long-distance runner
