= Anders Svensson (disambiguation) =

Anders Svensson is a Swedish former professional footballer. Anders Svensson may also refer to:

- Anders Svensson (bandy) (born 1975), Swedish bandy player
- Anders Svensson (canoeist) (born 1977), Swedish canoer
- Anders Svensson (footballer, born 1939) (1939–2007), Swedish footballer
