= Brian Morton =

Brian Morton may refer to:

- Brian Morton (American writer) (born 1955), American academic and novelist
- Brian Morton (Scottish writer) (born 1954), Scottish broadcaster, journalist and writer, who is most widely known as a jazz critic
- Brian Morton (canoeist) (born 1970), Australian sprint canoeist
