= Lakomy =

Lakomy, Lakomý (feminine: Lakomá) or Łakomy is a surname. Notable people with this surname include:

- Adam Lakomy (born 2006), American artistic gymnast
- Lena Lakomy (1917–2010), Polish Holocaust survivor
- Paweł Łakomy (born 1975), Polish sprint canoeist
- Petr Lakomý (born 1951), Czech rower
- Reinhard Lakomy (1946–2013), German musician
