= Dimitar Atanasov =

Dimitar Atanasov may refer to:

- Dimitar Atanasov (canoeist), Bulgarian sprint canoer
- Dimitar Atanasov (footballer) (born 1999), Bulgarian footballer
