= Fager =

Fager is a surname. Notable people with the surname include:

- Anders Fager (born 1964), Swedish author
- August Fager (1891–1967), American sportsman
- Chuck Fager (born 1942), American activist
- Jeff Fager (born 1954), American media executive
- Jonas Fager (born 1969), Swedish sportsman

== See also ==
- Dr. Fager (1964–1976), American thoroughbred racehorse

- Dr. Fager Stakes, a horserace in Florida
