= Thomas Jacobsen =

Thomas Jacobsen may refer to:

- Thomas Jacobsen (sailor) (born 1972), Danish sailor and Olympic champion
- Thomas Jacobsen (footballer) (born 1983), Norwegian footballer
- Thomas Jacobsen (sledge hockey) (born 1987), Norwegian ice sledge hockey player
- Thomas Jacobsen (violin maker), Danish violin maker
- Thomas Owen Jacobsen (1864–1941), British businessman and Liberal politician

== See also ==
- Thomas Jakobsen, mathematician, cryptographer, and computer programmer
- Thomas Holm Jakobsen, Danish sprint canoer
