= Pavel Mráz =

Pavel Mráz may refer to:

- Pavel Mráz (canoeist), Czech canoeist
- Pavel Mráz (footballer), Czech footballer
