= Bartosz Wolski =

Bartosz Wolski may refer to:

- Bartosz Wolski (canoeist), Olympic canoeist for the United States
- Bartosz Wolski (footballer), Polish footballer
