= Antal Páger =

Antal Páger may refer to:

- Antal Páger (actor) (1899–1986), Hungarian actor
- Antal Páger (canoeist), Hungarian canoer
