= Henrik Andersson =

Henrik Andersson may refer to:

- Henrik Andersson (canoeist), Swedish sprint canoer
- Henrik Andersson (tennis) (born 1977), former professional tennis player
- Henrik Andersson (badminton) (born 1977), Swedish badminton player
