= Zsolt Szádovszky =

Hungarian canoeist

Medal record

Men's canoe sprint

World Championships
Silver medal – second place	1998 Szeged	K-4 500 m
Silver medal – second place	1998 Szeged	K-4 1000 m

Zsolt Szadovszki (born 1974) is a Hungarian sprint canoer who competed in the late 1990s. He won two silver medals at the 1998 ICF Canoe Sprint World Championships in Szeged, earning them in the K-4 500 m and K-4 1000 m events.
