= Andreas Gjersøe =

Norwegian sprint canoer (born 1976)

Medal record

Men's canoe sprint

World Championships
Bronze medal – third place	1998 Szeged	K-4 200 m

Andreas Georg Gjersøe (sometimes shown as Andreas Gjersø, born 6 August 1976 in Bærum) is a Norwegian sprint canoer who competed from the late 1990s to the mid-2000s. He finished fifth in the K-4 1000 m event at the 2004 Summer Olympics in Athens and won a bronze medal in the K-4 200 m event at the 1998 ICF Canoe Sprint World Championships in Szeged.

He is 182 cm (6 ft 0 in) tall and weighs 80 kg (176 lb).
