= Zoltán Antal =

Hungarian canoeist (born 1971)

Medal record

Men's canoe sprint

World Championships
Silver medal – second place	1997 Dartmouth	K-4 1000 m
Bronze medal – third place	1994 Mexico City	K-4 500 m

Zoltán Antal (born December 8, 1971) is a Hungarian sprint canoer who competed in the mid-to-late 1990s. He won two medals at the ICF Canoe Sprint World Championships with a silver (K-4 1000 m: 1997) and a bronze (K-4 500 m: 1994).

Antal also competed in the K-1 500 m event at the 1996 Summer Olympics in Atlanta, but was eliminated in the semifinals.
