= Nils-Erik Jonsson =

Swedish sprint canoer

Medal record

Men's canoe sprint

World Championships
Bronze medal – third place	1997 Dartmouth	K-4 500 m

Nils-Erik Jonsson is a Swedish sprint canoer who competed in the late 1990s. He won a bronze medal in the K-4 500 m event at the 1997 ICF Canoe Sprint World Championships in Dartmouth.
