= Enrico Lupetti =

Italian sprint canoer (born 1967)

Enrico Lupetti (born April 30, 1967) is an Italian sprint canoer who competed in the early to mid-1990s. He was eliminated in the semifinals of the K-4 1000 m event at the 1992 Summer Olympics in Barcelona. Four years later in Atlanta, Lupetti was eliminated in the semifinals of the same event.
