= Ivano Lussignoli =

Italian canoeist

Medal record

Men's canoe sprint

World Championships
Silver medal – second place	1998 Szeged	K-4 200 m

Ivano Lussignoli (23 July 1972 – 20 September 2003) was an Italian sprint canoer who competed in the late 1990s. He won a silver medal in the K-4 200 m event at the 1998 ICF Canoe Sprint World Championships in Szeged.

Lussignoli competed in the K-4 1000 m event at the 1996 Summer Olympics in Atlanta, but was eliminated in the semifinals.
