= Oslo KK =

Norwegian canoe club

Logo.

Oslo Kajakklubb is a sports club from Oslo, Norway.

Established on 1 March 1931, its only sport is canoe racing. It is based at Bestumkilen outside of Skøyen, sharing the locality with the rowing club Bestumkilen RK. Member-wise, the club languished under the 1000 mark until the early 2000s, when membership was more than doubled. Among its 2,200 members in 2012, 40% were female.

Well-known members include 1936 Olympian Ivar Iversen, 1948 Olympic bronze medallist Eivind Skabo, 1976 Olympian Morten Opsahl, 1984 Olympian Finn Borchgrevink, and 2000 Olympic gold medallist Knut Holmann.

Among its head coaches are Tom Selvik. Among its chairmen of the board are Gerhard Aspheim. At times, the club has also had the chair and vice chair of the Norwegian Canoe Association, such as in 1961 with Reidar Webster and Ivar Iversen respectively.
