= Kimmo Latvamäki =

Finnish sprint canoer (born 1976)

Kimmo Kristian Latvamäki (born 6 June 1976 in Ruovesi) is a Finnish sprint canoeist who competed in the early to mid-2000s. At the 2000 Summer Olympics in Sydney, he was eliminated in the semifinals of the K-1 500 m event. Four years later in Athens, Latvamäki was eliminated in the semifinals of the same event.
