= Peter John (canoeist) =

German sprint canoer

Medal record

Men's canoe sprint

World Championships
| Bronze medal – third place | 1999 Milan | C-2 1000 m |

Peter John is a German sprint canoer who competed in the late 1990s. He won a bronze medal in the C-2 1000 m event at the 1999 ICF Canoe Sprint World Championships in Milan.
