= Konstantin Fomichev =

Russian sprint canoeist

Medal record

Men's canoe sprint

World Championships
Gold medal – first place	1999 Milan	C-2 200 m
Gold medal – first place	1999 Milan	C-4 200 m
Gold medal – first place	1999 Milan	C-4 500 m
Gold medal – first place	1999 Milan	C-4 1000 m
Silver medal – second place	1997 Dartmouth	C-4 1000 m
Silver medal – second place	1998 Szeged	C-4 1000 m
Silver medal – second place	2002 Seville	C-4 500 m
Bronze medal – third place	1998 Szeged	C-4 200 m
Bronze medal – third place	2001 Poznań	C-4 500 m

Konstantin Nikolaevich Fomichev (Russian: Константин Николаевич Фомичёв - born 30 August 1977 in Ufa, Russian SFSR, Soviet Union) is a Russian sprint canoeist who competed from the late 1990s to the mid-2000s. He won nine medals at the ICF Canoe Sprint World Championships with four golds (C-2 200 m, C-4 200 m, C-4 500 m, C-4 1000 m: all 1999), three silvers (C-4 500 m: 2002, C-4 1000 m: 1997, 1998), and two bronzes (C-4 200 m: 1998, C-4 500 m: 2001).

Formichev also finished ninth in the C-1 1000 m event at the 2004 Summer Olympics in Athens.
