= Vasiliy Mailov =

Russian canoeist

Medal record

Men's canoe sprint

World Championships
Silver medal – second place	1998 Szeged	C-4 1000 m

Vasiliy Mailov (born 12 March 1976) is a Russian sprint canoer who competed in the late 1990s. He won a silver medal in the C-4 1000 m event at the 1998 ICF Canoe Sprint World Championships in Szeged.
