= Gregorio Vicente =

Spanish canoeist

Gregorio Vicente (born 22 April 1969) is a Spanish sprint canoer who competed from the late 1980s to the late 1990s. Competing in three Summer Olympics, he earned his best finish of fifth in the K-4 1000 m event at Atlanta in 1996.
