= Krisztián Bártfai =

Hungarian canoeist (born 1974)

Medal record

Men's canoe sprint

Olympic Games
Bronze medal – third place	2000 Sydney	K-2 1000 m

World Championships
Gold medal – first place	1995 Duisburg	K-4 200 m
Silver medal – second place	1995 Duisburg	K-2 500 m
Silver medal – second place	1995 Duisburg	K-4 1000 m
Silver medal – second place	1997 Dartmouth	K-4 200 m
Silver medal – second place	1998 Szeged	K-4 500 m
Silver medal – second place	1998 Szeged	K-4 1000 m
Silver medal – second place	2001 Poznań	K-2 1000 m
Bronze medal – third place	1995 Dusiburg	K-2 200 m
Bronze medal – third place	1997 Dartmouth	K-2 500 m
Bronze medal – third place	1998 Szeged	K-2 500 m

Krisztián Bártfai (born July 16, 1974) is a Hungarian sprint canoer who competed from the early 1990s to 2001. Competing in three Summer Olympics, he won a bronze medal in the K-2 1000 m event at Sydney in 2000.

Bártfai also won ten medals at the ICF Canoe Sprint World Championships with a gold (K-4 200 m: 1995), six silvers (K-2 500 m: 1995, K-2 1000 m: 2001, K-4 200 m: 1997, K-4 500 m: 1998, K-4 1000 m: 1995, 1998), and three bronzes (K-2 200 m: 1995, K-2 500 m: 1997, 1998).

Having retired from his professional sports activities, he pursued a career as a professional pilot. He currently lives in Dubai and works as an airline Captain for Emirates. He also actively participates in building the UAE national paddling (kayaking) team as a volunteer Technical Manager for the Emirates Canoe and Rafting Federation (ECRF).
