= Aleksandr Popov (canoeist) =

Uzbekistani canoeist (born 1975)

Aleksandr Popov (born April 26, 1975) is an Uzbekistani sprint canoer who competed in the mid-1990s. Competing for Yugoslavia, he was eliminated in the repechages of the K-1 500 m event at the 1996 Summer Olympics in Atlanta.
