= V'iacheslav Kulida =

Ukrainian canoeist

V'iacheslav Hryhorovych Kulida (Ukrainian: В’ячеслав Григорович Куліда) (born January 22, 1970, in Kherson) is a Ukrainian sprint canoer who competed in the mid-1990s. He was eliminated in the semifinals of the K-4 1000 m event at the 1996 Summer Olympics in Atlanta.
