= Nikolay Yordanov =

Bulgarian sprint canoer (born 1969)

Medal record

Men's canoe sprint

World Championships
Bronze medal – third place	1989 Plovidv	K-4 500 m

Nikolay Yordanov (sometimes shown as Nikolay Jordanov (Bulgarian: Николай Йорданов), born October 18, 1969) is a Bulgarian sprint canoer who competed from the late 1980s to the mid-1990s. He won a bronze medal in the K-4 500 m event at the 1989 ICF Canoe Sprint World Championships in Plovdiv.

Yordanov also competed in three Summer Olympics, earning his best finish of eighth twice in the K-4 1000 m event (1992, 1996).
