= Grzegorz Kaleta =

Polish sprint canoer (born 1970)

Medal record

Men's canoe sprint

World Championships
Silver medal – second place	1990 Poznań	K-4 10000 m
Silver medal – second place	1993 Copenhagen	K-4 10000 m
Bronze medal – third place	1989 Plovdiv	K-4 10000 m
Bronze medal – third place	1995 Duisburg	K-4 500 m
Bronze medal – third place	1995 Duisburg	K-4 1000 m

European Championships
Bronze medal – third place	1997 Plovdiv	K4-1000 m

Grzegorz Kaleta (born 21 May 1970) is a Polish sprint canoer who competed from the late 1980s to the mid-1990s. He won five medals at the ICF Canoe Sprint World Championships with two silvers (K-4 10000 m: 1990, 1993) and three bronzes (K-4 500 m: 1995, K-4 1000 m: 1995, K-4 10000 m: 1989).

Kaleta also competed in two Summer Olympics, earning his best finish of fourth in the K-4 1000 m event at Atlanta in 1996.
