= Jean-Gilles Grare =

French canoeist

Medal record

Men's canoe sprint

World Championships
Bronze medal – third place	1999 Milan	C-4 500 m

Jean-Gilles Grare is a French sprint canoer.

== Career ==
Grare competed from the late 1990s to the mid-2000s. He won a bronze medal in the C-4 500 m event at the 1999 ICF Canoe Sprint World Championships in Milan.
