= James Walker (canoeist) =

Australian canoeist (born 1971)

James "Jimmy" Walker (born 8 December 1971) is an Australian sprint canoeist who competed in the mid-1990s. He finished ninth in the K-4 1000 m event at the 1996 Summer Olympics in Atlanta.
