= Hain Helde =

Estonian canoeist

Hain Helde (born 21 March 1972 in Kohila) is an Estonian sprint canoer who competed from the mid-1990s to the early 2000s. He was eliminated in the semifinals of both the K-1 500 m and the K-1 1000 m events at the 1996 Summer Olympics in Atlanta. Four years later in Sydney, Helde was eliminated in the semifinals of the same events.
