= Petar Karadzhov =

Bulgarian sprint canoer (born 1975)

Peter Karadzhov (Bulgarian: Петър Караджов) (born March 29, 1975) is a Bulgarian sprint canoer who competed in the mid-1990s. He finished eighth in the K-4 1000 m event at the 1996 Summer Olympics in Atlanta.

He competed in Bulgaria and then competed in Canada. Petar Karadjov began kayaking at the age of 11 in Sofia.

In 1996, he participated at his first Olympic Games with his 3 other teammates in Kayak K-4. Bulgaria came 8th out of 9 in the 1000m race 4K.
