= Paul Lynch (canoeist) =

Australian canoeist (born 1967)

Paul Lynch (born 18 December 1967) is an Australian sprint canoeist who competed in the mid-1990s. He finished ninth in the K-4 1000 m event at the 1996 Summer Olympics in Atlanta.
