= Jens Lubrich =

German canoeist

Medal record

Men's canoe sprint

World Championships
Bronze medal – third place	1995 Duisburg	C-4 1000 m

Jens Lubrich is a German sprint canoer who competed in the mid-1990s. He won a bronze medal in the C-4 1000m event at the 1995 ICF Canoe Sprint World Championships in Duisburg.

Jens also won five medals at the IDBF Dragonboat World Championships with one silver (Premier Mix 250m) and two bronze medals (Premier Mix 500m, Premier Open 1000m) for Germany at the 2001 IDBF Dragonboat World Championships in Philadelphia, USA, and two bronze medals (Premier Mix 200m and 500m) for Australia at the 2007 IDBF Dragonboat World Championships in Sydney, Australia.
