= Alan van Coller =

South African canoeist (born 1967)

Alan van Coller (born 10 September 1967) is a South African canoe sprinter who competed in the early to mid-2000s. Competing in two Summer Olympics, he earned his best finish of eighth in the K-1 500 m event at Sydney in 2000. He was born in Johannesburg.
