= Martin Otáhal =

Czech sprint canoer (born 1971)

Martin Otáhal (born 28 March 1971 in Prague) is a Czech sprint canoer who competed in the mid-1990s. He was eliminated in the semifinals of the K-4 1000 m event at the 1996 Summer Olympics in Atlanta.
