= Ute Plessmann =

German canoeist

Medal record

Women's canoe sprint

World Championships
Silver medal – second place	1998 Szeged	K-2 1000 m

Ute Plessmann is a German canoe sprinter who competed in the late 1990s. She won a silver medal in the K-2 1000 m event at the 1998 ICF Canoe Sprint World Championships in Szeged.
