= Rene Pflugmacher =

German canoeist

Medal record

Men's canoe sprint

World Championships
Gold medal – first place	1995 Duisburg	K-4 1000 m

Rene Pflugmacher is a German sprint canoer who competed in the mid-1990s. He won a gold medal in the K-4 1000 m event at the 1995 ICF Canoe Sprint World Championships in Duisburg.
