= Cameron McFadzean =

Australian canoeist

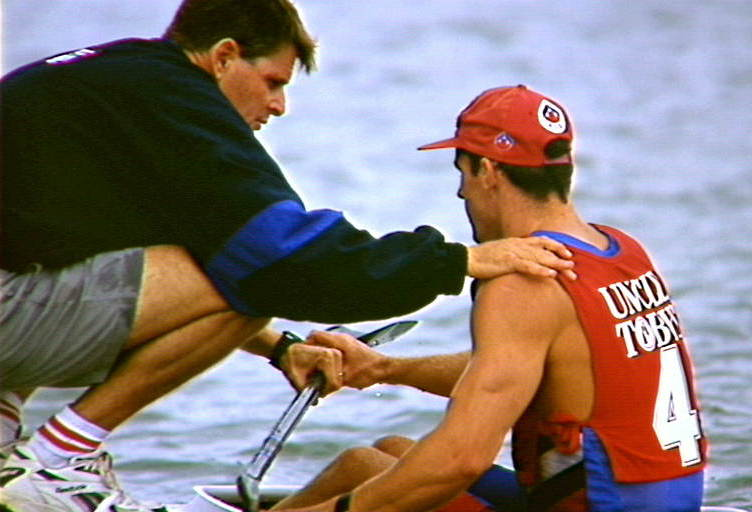
Cameron McFadzean (right) with AIS Coach Barry Kelly

Cameron McFadzean (born 7 May 1971, in Melbourne), is an Australian sprint canoeist who competed from the mid-1990s to the early 2000s (decade). Competing in two Summer Olympics, he earned his best finish of ninth in the K-1 500 m event at Atlanta in 1996.

McFadzean is a registered architect, and has been a director of an architectural visualisation and design studio since 1999.
