= 1999 ICF Canoe Sprint World Championships =

International sporting competition

- Host city: Milan, Italy at the Idroscalo

The 1999 ICF Canoe Sprint World Championships were held in Milan, Italy at the Idroscalo.

The men's competition consisted of nine Canadian (single paddle, open boat) and nine kayak events. Women competed in eight events, all kayak.

This was the 30th championships in canoe sprint.

== Medal summary ==
=== Men's ===
==== Canoe ====
Event	Gold	Time	Silver	Time	Bronze	Time
C-1 200 m	Maxim Opalev (RUS)		Martin Doktor (CZE)		Slavomír Kňazovický (SVK)	
C-1 500 m	Maxim Opalev (RUS)		Martin Doktor (CZE)		Andreas Dittmer (GER)	
C-1 1000 m	Maxim Opalev (RUS)		Andreas Dittmer (GER)		Martin Doktor (CZE)	
C-2 200 m	Russia; Konstantin Fomichev; Aleksandr Artemida		Poland; Daniel Jędraszko; Paweł Baraszkiewicz		Germany; Thomas Zereske; Christian Gille	
C-2 500 m	Poland; Daniel Jędraszko; Paweł Baraszkiewicz		Hungary; Imre Pulai; Ferenc Novák		Russia; Aleksandr Kovalyov; Aleksandr Kostoglod	
C-2 1000 m	Russia; Aleksandr Kovalyov; Aleksandr Kostoglod		Cuba; Ibrahim Rojas; Leobaldo Pereira		Germany; Patrick Schulze; Peter John	
C-4 200 m	Russia; Roman Krugylakov; Vladimir Ladocha; Konstantin Fomichev; Andrey Kabanov		Czech Republic; Petr Procházka; Jan Břečka; Petr Fuksa; Karel Kožíšek		Romania; Miticia Pricop; Ionel Averian; Gheorghe Andriev; Florin Popescu	
C-4 500 m	Russia; Roman Krugylakov; Vladimir Ladocha; Konstantin Fomichev; Andrey Kabanov		Romania; Miticia Pricop; Ionel Averian; Gheorghe Andriev; Florin Popescu		France; Yannick Lavigne; Jean-Gilles Grare; Mathieu Gobel; Sylvain Hoyer	
C-4 1000 m	Russia; Ignat Kovalev; Konstantin Fomichev; Aleksey Volkonskiy; Andrey Kabanov		Romania; Miticia Pricop; Ionel Averian; Iosif Anisim; Samil Grigoe		Hungary; Csaba Horváth; Béla Belicza; Aron Gajarszki; György Kozmann	

==== Kayak ====
Event	Gold	Time	Silver	Time	Bronze	Time
K-1 200 m	Michael Kolganov (ISR)		Oleksiy Slivinskiy (UKR)		Ronald Rauhe (GER)	
K-1 500 m	Ákos Verecki (HUN)		Petar Merkov (BUL)		Grzegorz Kotowicz (POL)	
K-1 1000 m	Lutz Liwowski (GER)		Knut Holmann (NOR)		Torsten Tranum (DEN)	
K-2 200 m	Hungary; Vince Fehérvári; Róbert Hegedűs		Russia; Roman Zarubin; Aleksandr Ivanik		Poland; Marek Twardowski; Adam Wysocki	
K-2 500 m	Poland; Marek Twardowski; Adam Wysocki		Hungary; Botond Storcz; Gábor Horvárth		Australia; Daniel Collins; Andrew Trim	
K-2 1000 m	Slovakia; Michal Riszdorfer; Juraj Bača		Poland; Marek Twardowski; Adam Wysocki		Germany; Jan Schäfer; Olaf Winter	
K-4 200 m	Hungary; Gyula Kajner; Vince Fehérvári; István Beé; Róbert Hegedűs		Poland; Piotr Markiewicz; Marek Twardowski; Adam Wysocki; Paweł Łakomy		Russia; Anatoly Tishchenko; Andrey Shchegolikhin; Oleg Gorobiy; Vitaliy Gankin	
K-4 500 m	Germany; Torsten Gustche; Mark Zabel; Björn Bach; Stefan Ulm		Russia; Andrey Tissin; Vitaliy Gankin; Aleksandr Ivanik; Roman Zarubin		Hungary; Zoltán Kammerer; Botond Storcz; Ákos Vereckei; Gábor Horváth	
K-4 1000 m	Hungary; Zoltán Kammerer; Botond Storcz; Ákos Vereckei; Gábor Horváth		Germany; Torsten Gutsche; Mark Zabel; Björn Bach; Stefan Ulm		Romania; Sorin Petcu; Vasile Curuzan; Marian Sîrbu; Romică Șerban	

=== Women's ===
==== Kayak ====
Event	Gold	Time	Silver	Time	Bronze	Time
K-1 200 m	Caroline Brunet (CAN)		Josefa Idem (ITA)		Rita Kőbán (HUN)	
K-1 500 m	Caroline Brunet (CAN)		Josefa Idem (ITA)		Rita Kőbán (HUN)	
K-1 1000 m	Caroline Brunet (CAN)		Josefa Idem (ITA)		Katalin Kovács (HUN)	
K-2 200 m	Spain; Izaskun Aramburu; Beatriz Manchón		Poland; Beata Sokołowska; Aneta Pastuszka		Hungary; Rita Kőbán; Eva Laky	
K-2 500 m	Poland; Beata Sokołowska; Aneta Pastuszka		Canada; Caroline Brunet; Karen Furneaux		Hungary; Katalin Kovács; Szilvia Szabó	
K-2 1000 m	Australia; Anna Wood; Katrin Borchert		Germany; Manuela Mucke; Katrin Wagner		Hungary; Kinga Bóta; Andrea Barosci	
K-4 200 m	Hungary; Katalin Kovács; Erzsébet Viski; Szilvia Szabó; Rita Kőbán		Russia; Natalya Gouily; Yelena Tissina; Larissa Peisakhovich; Tatyana Tischenko		Poland; Beata Sokołowska; Aneta Pastuszka; Agata Piszcz; Aneta Michalak	
K-4 500 m	Hungary; Katalin Kovács; Erzsébet Viski; Szilvia Szabó; Rita Kőbán		Germany; Birgit Fischer; Anett Schuck; Manuela Mucke; Katrin Wagner		Poland; Beata Sokołowska; Aneta Pastuszka; Aneta Michalak; Joanna Skowroń	

== Medal table ==
Rank	Nation	Gold	Silver	Bronze	Total
1	Russia	8	3	2	13
2	Hungary	6	2	8	16
3	Poland	3	4	4	11
4	Canada	3	1	0	4
5	Germany	2	4	5	11
6	Australia	1	0	1	2
6	Slovakia	1	0	1	2
8	Israel	1	0	0	1
8	Spain	1	0	0	1
10	Czech Republic	0	3	1	4
11	Italy	0	3	0	3
12	Romania	0	2	2	4
13	Bulgaria	0	1	0	1
13	Cuba	0	1	0	1
13	Norway	0	1	0	1
13	Ukraine	0	1	0	1
17	Denmark	0	0	1	1
17	France	0	0	1	1
Totals (18 entries)		26	26	26	78
