= Vitaliy Gankin =

Russian sprint canoer

Medal record

Men's canoe sprint

World Championships
Silver medal – second place	1999 Milan	K-4 500 m
Bronze medal – third place	1998 Szeged	K-4 500 m
Bronze medal – third place	1999 Milan	K-4 200 m

Vitaliy Gankin is a Russian sprint canoer who competed in the late 1990s. He won three medals at the ICF Canoe Sprint World Championships with a silver (K-4 500 m: 1999) and two bronzes (K-4 200 m: 1999, K-4 500 m: 1998).
