= Agata Piszcz =

Polish canoeist

Medal record

Women's canoe sprint

World Championships
Bronze medal – third place	1999 Milan	K-4 200 m

Agata Piszcz is a Polish sprint canoer who competed in the late 1990s. She won a bronze medal in the K-4 200 m event at the 1999 ICF Canoe Sprint World Championships in Milan.
