= Peter Giles (canoeist) =

Canadian sprint kayaker

Personal information
- Full name: Peter Mark Giles
- Born: April 18, 1970 (age 56) London, Ontario, Canada
- Height: 6 ft 2 in (1.88 m)
- Weight: 190 lb (86 kg)

Sport
- Sport: Kayaking
- Event: K-4 1000m
- Club: Orenda Canoe Club
Medal record
Representing Canada
Pan American Games
Bronze medal – third place	1991 Havana	K-1 100m
Bronze medal – third place	1991 Havana	K-2 1000m
Bronze medal – third place	1991 Havana	K-4 1000m

Peter Mark Giles (born April 18, 1970) is a Canadian sprint kayaker who competed in the mid-1990s. He finished seventh in the K-4 1000 m event at the 1996 Summer Olympics in Atlanta. His brother, Stephen Giles, is also an Olympic canoeist.
