= Georgi Choykov =

Bulgarian sprint canoer

Georgi Choykov (Bulgarian: Георги Чойков) (born February 14, 1974) is a Bulgarian sprint canoer who competed in the mid-1990s. He finished eighth in the K-4 1000 m event at the 1996 Summer Olympics in Atlanta.
