= Pavel Hottmar =

Czech canoeist

Pavel Hottmar (born 28 June 1979 in Liberec) is a Czech sprint canoer who competed in the early 2000s. At the 2000 Summer Olympics in Sydney, he was eliminated in the semifinals of both the K-1 500 m and the K-4 1000 m events.
