= Danica Rice =

Canadian sprint kayaker

Medal record

Women's canoe sprint

World Championships
Silver medal – second place	1997 Dartmouth	K-4 200 m

Danica Rice is a Canadian sprint kayaker who competed in the late-1990s. She won a silver medal in the K-4 200 m event at the 1997 ICF Canoe Sprint World Championships in Dartmouth, Nova Scotia.
