= Mark Eschelbach =

German sprint canoer

Medal record

Men's canoe sprint

World Championships
Silver medal – second place	1995 Duisburg	C-2 200 m

Mark Eschelbach is a German sprint canoer who competed in the mid-1990s. He won a silver medal in the C-2 200 m event at the 1995 ICF Canoe Sprint World Championships in Duisburg.
