= Ivan Hristov (canoeist) =

Bulgarian canoeist

Medal record

Men's canoe sprint

World Championships
| Bronze medal – third place | 2002 Seville | K-4 1000 m |

Ivan Khristov (Bulgarian: Иван Христов) (born 3 March 1982) is a Bulgarian sprint canoer who competed in the early to mid-2000s. He won a bronze medal in the K-4 1000 m event at the 2002 ICF Canoe Sprint World Championships in Seville.

Khristov also competed in two events at the 2004 Summer Olympics in Athens, finishing fourth in the K-4 1000 m while being eliminated in the semifinals of the K-2 500 m event.
