= Andrea Covi =

Italian sprint canoer (born 1968

Andrea Covi (born 16 June 1968 in Modena) is an Italian sprint canoer who competed in the mid-1990s. He was eliminated in the semifinals of the K-4 1000 m event at the 1996 Summer Olympics in Atlanta.
