= Robby Roarsen =

Norwegian sprint canoer (born 1974)

Medal record

Men's canoe sprint

World Championships
Bronze medal – third place	1998 Szeged	K-4 200 m

Robby Roarsen Haugli (born 1974) is a Norwegian sprint canoer who competed in the late 1990s. He won a bronze medal in the K-4 200 m event at the 1998 ICF Canoe Sprint World Championships in Szeged.

He represented the club Strand KK.
