= 1998 ICF Canoe Sprint World Championships =

International canoeing competition

- Host city: Szeged, Hungary

The 1998 ICF Canoe Sprint World Championships were held in Szeged, Hungary.

The men's competition consisted of nine Canadian (single paddle, open boat) and nine kayak events. Women competed in eight events, all in kayak.

This was the 29th championships in canoe sprint.

== Medal summary ==
=== Men's ===
==== Canoe ====
Event	Gold	Time	Silver	Time	Bronze	Time
C-1 200 m	Martin Doktor (CZE)		Slavomír Kňazovický (SVK)		Michał Śliwiński (UKR)	
C-1 500 m	Maksim Opalev (RUS)		Andreas Dittmer (GER)		Michał Śliwiński (UKR)	
C-1 1000 m	Steve Giles (CAN)		Martin Doktor (CZE)		Andreas Dittmer (GER)	
C-2 200 m	Germany; Thomas Zereske; Christian Gille		Hungary; Miklós Buzál; Attila Végh		Russia; Vladislav Polzounov; Andrey Kabanov	
C-2 500 m	Hungary; György Kolonics; Csaba Horváth		Poland; Daniel Jędraszko; Paweł Baraszkiewicz		Germany; Thomas Zereske; Christian Gille	
C-2 1000 m	Russia; Aleksandr Kovalyov; Aleksandr Kostoglod		Romania; Gheorghe Andriev; Florin Popescu		Hungary; György Zala; Endre Ipacs	
C-4 200 m	Czech Republic; Petr Procházka; Tomáš Křivánek; Petr Fuksa; Karel Kožíšek		Belarus; Aleksandr Masseykov; Andrey Beliayev; Anatoliy Reneiskiy; Vladimir Marinov		Russia; Pavel Konovalov; Konstantin Fomichev; Vladimir Ladosha; Aleksandr Kostoglod	
C-4 500 m	Hungary; György Kolonics; Csaba Horváth; Csaba Hüttner; László Szuszkó		Romania; Gheorghe Andriev; Florin Popescu; Cosmin Pașca; Ionel Averian		Russia; Aleksandr Kostoglod; Pavel Konovalov; Vladislav Polzounov; Vladimir Ladosha	
C-4 1000 m	Hungary; Csaba Horváth; Béla Belicza; Csaba Hüttner; László Szuszkó		Russia; Konstantin Fomichev; Vasiliy Mailov; Andrey Kabanov; Ignat Kovalev		Czech Republic; Martin Doktor; Petr Netušil; Jan Macháč; Viktor Jiráský	

==== Kayak ====
Event	Gold	Time	Silver	Time	Bronze	Time
K-1 200 m	Michael Kolganov (ISR)		Oleksiy Slivinskiy (UKR)		Ognjen Filipović (YUG)	
K-1 500 m	Ákos Vereckei (HUN)		Michael Kolganov (ISR)		Lutz Liwowski (GER)	
K-1 1000 m	Lutz Liwowski (GER)		Knut Holmann (NOR)		Javier Correa (ARG)	
K-2 200 m	Hungary; Vince Fehérvári; Róbert Hegedűs		Russia; Sergey Verlin; Anatoly Tishchenko		Romania; Geza Magyar; Romică Șerban	
K-2 500 m	Slovakia; Michal Riszdorfer; Juraj Bača		Italy; Beniamino Bonomi; Luca Negri		Hungary; Krisztián Bártfai; Gábor Horvárth	
K-2 1000 m	Italy; Antonio Rossi; Luca Negri		Yugoslavia; Mićo Janić; Stjepan Janić		Hungary; Attila Adám; Krisztián Veréb	
K-4 200 m	Hungary; Gyula Kajner; Vince Fehérvári; István Beé; Róbert Hegedűs		Italy; Antonio Rossi; Beniamino Bonomi; Ivano Lussignoli; Luca Negri		Norway; Andreas Gjersø; Nils Olav Fjeldheim; Knut Holmann; Robby Roarsen Hangli	
K-4 500 m	Germany; Torsten Gutsche; Mark Zabel; Björn Bach; Stefan Ulm		Hungary; Botond Storcz; Krisztián Bártfai; Zsolt Szádovszky; Márton Bauer		Russia; Andrey Tissin; Andrey Shchegolikhin; Vitaliy Gankin; Roman Zarubin	
K-4 1000 m	Germany; Torsten Gutsche; Mark Zabel; Björn Bach; Stefan Ulm		Hungary; Botond Storcz; Krisztián Bártfai; Zsolt Szádovszky; Márton Bauer		Russia; Anatoly Tishchenko; Sergey Verlin; Georgiy Tsybulnikov; Aleksandr Ivanik	

=== Women's ===
==== Kayak ====
Event	Gold	Time	Silver	Time	Bronze	Time
K-1 200 m	Caroline Brunet (CAN)		Josefa Idem (ITA)		Éva Dónusz (HUN)	
K-1 500 m	Caroline Brunet (CAN)		Katrin Borchert (AUS)		Josefa Idem (ITA)	
K-1 1000 m	Josefa Idem (ITA)		Caroline Brunet (CAN)		Katrin Borchert (AUS)	
K-2 200 m	Canada; Marie-Josée Gibeau-Ouimet; Karen Furneaux		Hungary; Kinga Dékány; Rita Kőbán		Spain; Beatriz Manchón; Izaskun Aramburu	
K-2 500 m	Australia; Anna Wood; Katrin Borchert		Germany; Birgit Fischer; Anett Schuck		Hungary; Kinga Dékány; Rita Kőbán	
K-2 1000 m	Australia; Anna Wood; Katrin Borchert		Germany; Birgit Fischer; Ute Plessman		Sweden; Anna Karlsson; Susanne Gunnarsson	
K-4 200 m	Hungary; Kinga Dékány; Erzsébet Viski; Rita Kőbán; Katalin Kovács		Sweden; Anna Karlsson; Susanne Gunnarsson; Ingela Eriksson; Maria Haglund		Russia; Natalya Gouily; Yelena Tissina; Larissa Peisakhovich; Tatyana Tischenko	
K-4 500 m	Germany; Birgit Fischer; Anett Schuck; Manuela Mucke; Marcela Bednar		Hungary; Kinga Dékány; Szilvia Szabó; Andrea Barocsi; Katalin Kovács		Spain; Beatriz Manchón; Izaskun Aramburu; Ana María Penas; Belen Sánchez	

== Medal table ==
Rank	Nation	Gold	Silver	Bronze	Total
1	Hungary	7	5	5	17
2	Germany	5	3	3	11
3	Canada	4	1	0	5
4	Italy	2	3	1	6
5	Russia	2	2	6	10
6	Australia	2	1	1	4
6	Czech Republic	2	1	1	4
8	Israel	1	1	0	2
8	Slovakia	1	1	0	2
10	Romania	0	2	1	3
11	Ukraine	0	1	2	3
12	Norway	0	1	1	2
12	Sweden	0	1	1	2
12	Yugoslavia	0	1	1	2
15	Belarus	0	1	0	1
15	Poland	0	1	0	1
17	Spain	0	0	2	2
18	Argentina	0	0	1	1
Totals (18 entries)		26	26	26	78
