= Francisco Llera =

Spanish canoeist

Medal record

Men's canoe sprint

World Championships
Gold medal – first place	2009 Dartmouth	K-1 4 x 200 m
Gold medal – first place	2010 Poznań	K-1 4 x 200 m

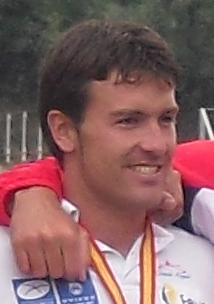
Francisco Llera

Francisco Llera Blanco (born 18 January 1981 in Ribadesella) is a Spanish sprint canoeist who has competed since the mid-2000s. He won two gold medals in the K-1 4 x 200 m event at the ICF Canoe Sprint World Championships (2009, 2010).

Llera also finished sixth in the K-2 500 m event at the 2004 Summer Olympics in Athens.
