= Mattias Oscarsson =

Swedish sprint canoer (born 1975)

Peter Mattias Oscarsson (born 12 April 1975 in Västerås) is a Swedish sprint canoer who competed in the mid-1990s. He finished sixth in the K-4 1000 m event at the 1996 Summer Olympics in Atlanta.
