= 1995 ICF Canoe Sprint World Championships =

International canoe competition

- Host city: Duisburg, Germany

The 1995 ICF Canoe Sprint World Championships were held in Duisburg, Germany for the third time. The German city had hosted the event previously in 1979 and 1987 when it was part of West Germany.

The men's competition consisted of nine Canadian (single paddle, open boat) and nine kayak events. Six events were held for the women, all in kayak.

This was the 27th championships in canoe sprint.

== Medal summary ==
=== Men's ===
==== Canoe ====
Event	Gold	Time	Silver	Time	Bronze	Time
C-1 200 m	Nikolay Bukhalov (BUL)		Thomas Zereske (GER)		Michał Śliwiński (UKR)	
C-1 500 m	Nikolay Bukhalov (BUL)		Martin Doktor (CZE)		Imre Pulai (HUN)	
C-1 1000 m	Imre Pulai (HUN)		Martin Doktor (CZE)		Ivan Klementiev (LAT)	
C-2 200 m	Hungary; György Kolonics; Csaba Horváth		Germany; Mark Eschelbach; Thomas Zereske		Bulgaria; Martin Marinov; Blagovest Stoyanov	
C-2 500 m	Hungary; György Kolonics; Csaba Horváth		Moldova; Viktor Reneisky; Nicolae Juravschi		Germany; Andreas Dittmer; Gunar Kirchbach	
C-2 1000 m	Hungary; György Kolonics; Csaba Horváth		Romania; Antonel Borșan; Marcel Glăvan		Germany; Andreas Dittmer; Gunar Kirchbach	
C-4 200 m	Hungary; Ervin Hoffman; Attila Szabó; György Kolonics; Csaba Horváth		Czech Republic; Petr Procházka; Tomáš Křivánek; Roman Dittrich; Waldemar Fibgir		France; Oliver Bolvin; Sylvain Hoyer; Eric le Leuch; Benoît Bernard	
C-4 500 m	Hungary; Ervin Hoffman; Attila Szabó; György Kolonics; Csaba Horváth		Romania; Marcel Glăvan; Cosmin Pașca; Antonel Borșan; Florin Popescu		Bulgaria; Rumen Nikolov; Atanas Angelov; Stanimir Atanasov; Dimitar Atanasov	
C-4 1000 m	Romania; Marcel Glăvan; Cosmin Pașca; Antonel Borșan; Florin Popescu		Hungary; Gáspár Boldizsár; Ferenc Novák; Csaba Hüttner; György Zala		Germany; Ulrich Papke; Patrick Schulze; Christian Gille; Jens Lubrich	

==== Kayak ====
Event	Gold	Time	Silver	Time	Bronze	Time
K-1 200 m	Piotr Markiewicz (POL)		Sergey Kalesnik (BLR)		Renn Crichlow (CAN)	
K-1 500 m	Piotr Markiewicz (POL)		Knut Holmann (NOR)		Geza Magyar (ROU)	
K-1 1000 m	Knut Holmann (NOR)		Clint Robinson (AUS)		Liut Liwowski (GER)	
K-2 200 m	United States; Stein Jorgensen; John Mooney		Romania; Romică Șerban; Daniel Stolan		Hungary; Zsolt Gyulay; Krisztián Bártfai	
K-2 500 m	Italy; Beniamino Bonomi; Daniele Scarpa		Hungary; Zsolt Gyulay; Krisztián Bártfai		Poland; Maciej Freimut; Adam Wysocki	
K-2 1000 m	Italy; Antonio Rossi; Daniele Scarpa		Germany; Kay Bluhm; Thomas Guitsche		Poland; Grzegorz Kotowicz; Dariusz Białkowski	
K-4 200 m	Hungary; Krisztián Bártfai; Gyula Kajner; Antal Páger; Gábor Pankotai		Russia; Anatoly Tishchenko; Oleg Gorobiy; Sergey Verlin; Viktor Denisov		Germany; Thomas Reineck; André Wohllebe; Jan Günther; Mark Zabel	
K-4 500 m	Russia; Viktor Denisov; Anatoly Tishchenko; Sergey Verlin; Oleg Gorobiy		Germany; Detlef Hofmann; Thomas Reineck; Mario van Appen; Mark Zabel		Poland; Grzegorz Kotowicz; Marek Witkowski; Grzegorz Kaleta; Dariusz Białkowski	
K-4 1000 m	Germany; Detlef Hofmann; Rene Pflugmacher; Thomas Reineck; Mark Zabel		Hungary; Zsolt Gyulay; Attila Ábrahám; Krisztián Bártfai; Gábor Szabó		Poland; Grzegorz Kotowicz; Marek Witkowski; Grzegorz Kaleta; Dariusz Białkowski	

=== Women's ===
==== Kayak ====
Event	Gold	Time	Silver	Time	Bronze	Time
K-1 200 m	Rita Kőbán (HUN)		Caroline Brunet (CAN)		Anna Olsson (SWE)	
K-1 500 m	Rita Kőbán (HUN)		Caroline Brunet (CAN)		Susanne Gunnarsson (SWE)	
K-2 200 m	Canada; Corinna Kennedy; Marie-Josée Gilbeau		Sweden; Susanne Rosenqvist; Susanne Gunnarsson		Russia; Larissa Kosorukova; Tatyana Tischenko	
K-2 500 m	Germany; Ramona Portwich; Anett Schuck		Poland; Elżbieta Urbańczyk; Barbara Hacjel		Sweden; Susanne Rosenqvist; Susanne Gunnarsson	
K-4 200 m	Canada; Caroline Brunet; Alison Herst; Corrina Kennedy; Marie-Josée Gibeau		Germany; Manuela Mucke; Ramona Portwich; Birgit Schmidt; Anett Schuck		Sweden; Ingela Eriksson; Maria Haglund; Anna Olsson; Susanne Rosenqvist	
K-4 500 m	Germany; Manuela Mucke; Ramona Portwich; Birgit Schmidt; Anett Schuck		China; Xian Bangdi; Gao Beibei; Dong Ying; Zhang Qin		Hungary; Kinga Czigány; Éva Dónusz; Rita Kőbán; Szilvia Mednyánszky	

== Medals table ==
Rank	Nation	Gold	Silver	Bronze	Total
1	Hungary	9	3	3	15
2	Germany	3	5	5	13
3	Canada	2	2	1	5
4	Poland	2	1	4	7
5	Bulgaria	2	0	2	4
6	Italy	2	0	0	2
7	Romania	1	3	1	5
8	Russia	1	1	1	3
9	Norway	1	1	0	2
10	United States	1	0	0	1
11	Czech Republic	0	3	0	3
12	Sweden	0	1	4	5
13	Australia	0	1	0	1
13	Belarus	0	1	0	1
13	China	0	1	0	1
13	Moldova	0	1	0	1
17	France	0	0	1	1
17	Latvia	0	0	1	1
17	Ukraine	0	0	1	1
Totals (19 entries)		24	24	24	72
