= Aron Gajarszki =

Hungarian canoeist

Medal record

Men's canoe sprint

World Championships
Bronze medal – third place	1999 Milan	C-4 1000 m

Aron Gajarszki is a Hungarian sprint canoer and marathon canoeist who competed in the late 1990s. He won a bronze medal in the C-4 1000 m event at the 1999 ICF Canoe Sprint World Championships in Milan.
