= Kinga Dékány =

Hungarian sprint canoer

Medal record

Women's canoe sprint

World Championships
Gold medal – first place	1998 Szeged	K-4 200 m
Gold medal – first place	2001 Poznań	K-4 200 m
Gold medal – first place	2001 Poznań	K-4 1000 m
Gold medal – first place	2003 Gainesville	K-4 1000 m
Silver medal – second place	1997 Dartmouth	K-4 500 m
Silver medal – second place	1998 Szeged	K-2 200 m
Silver medal – second place	1998 Szeged	K-4 500 m
Bronze medal – third place	1998 Szeged	K-2 500 m
Bronze medal – third place	2001 Poznań	K-2 200 m

Kinga Dekany is a Hungarian sprint canoer who has competed from the late 1990s to the mid-2000s. She won nine medals at the ICF Canoe Sprint World Championships with four golds (K-4 200 m: 1998, 2001; K-4 1000 m: 2001, 2003), three silvers (K-2 200 m: 1998, K-4 500 m: 1997, 1998), and two bronzes (K-2 500 m: 1998, 2001).

== Awards ==
- Hungarian kayaker of the Year (1): 1998
