= Gábor Pankotai =

Hungarian canoeist

Medal record

Men's canoe sprint

World Championships
Gold medal – first place	1995 Duisburg	K-4 200 m

Gábor Pankotai is a Hungarian sprint canoer who competed in the mid-1990s. He won a gold medal in the K-4 200 m event at the 1995 ICF Canoe Sprint World Championships in Duisburg.
