= Vladimir Grushikhin =

Armenian-Russian sprint canoeist (born 1971)

Medal record

Men's canoe sprint

World Championships
Bronze medal – third place	2003 Gainesville	K-4 500 m

Vladimir Grushikin (Russian: Владимир Юрьевич Грушихин; born 11 June 1971 in Moscow, Russian SFSR) is an Armenian-Russian sprint canoeist who competed for Armenia in the early 2000s before competing for Russia in the mid-2000s. He won a bronze medal in the K-4 500 m at the 2003 ICF Canoe Sprint World Championships in Gainesville for Russia.

Grushikhin also competed in two Summer Olympics. At the 2000 Summer Olympics in Sydney competing for Armenia, he was eliminated in the semifinals of the K-1 1000 m event while being disqualified in the semifinals of the K-1 500 m event. Four years later in Athens, competing for Russia, Gurshikhin was eliminated in the semifinals of the K-2 1000 m event while finishing ninth in the K-2 500 m event.
