= László Szuszkó =

Hungarian canoeist

Medal record

Men's canoe sprint

World Championships
| Gold medal – first place | 1997 Dartmouth | C-4 500 m |
| Gold medal – first place | 1998 Szeged | C-4 500 m |
| Gold medal – first place | 1998 Szeged | C-4 1000 m |

László Szuszkó is a Hungarian sprint canoer who competed in the late 1990s. He won three gold medals at the ICF Canoe Sprint World Championships with two in the C-4 500 m (1997, 1998) and one in the C-4 1000 m (1998) events.
