= Adam Dean =

Australian sprint canoer

Medal record

Men's canoe sprint

Representing Australia

World Championships
Bronze medal – third place	1997 Dartmouth	K-4 1000 m

Adam Dean is an Australian sprint canoer who competed in the late 1990s and early first decade of the 21st century. He won a bronze medal in the K-4 1000 m event at the 1997 ICF Canoe Sprint World Championships in Dartmouth.
