= Adrian Bachmann =

Swiss sprint canoer (born 1976)

Adrian Bachmann (born 12 July 1976) is a Swiss sprint canoer who competed in the early 2000s. At the 2000 Summer Olympics in Sydney, he was eliminated in the semifinals of both the K-1 500 m and the K-1 1000 m events.
