= Endre Ipacs =

Hungarian canoeist

Medal record

Men's canoe sprint

World Championships
Bronze medal – third place	1998 Szeged	C-2 1000 m

Endre Ipacs is a Hungarian sprint canoer who competed in the late 1990s. He won a bronze medal in the C-2 1000 m event at the 1998 ICF Canoe Sprint World Championships in Szeged.
