= Tom Selvik =

Norwegian canoeist

Tom Selvik (born 16 May 1970) is a Norwegian sprint canoer who competed in the mid-1990s.

He was eliminated in the semifinals of the K-4 1000 m event at the 1996 Summer Olympics in Atlanta. He represented the Bergen-based club Njørd ro- og kajakklubb and has been the head coach in Oslo KK.
