= Andrey Petrov (canoeist) =

Ukrainian canoeist

Medal record

Men's canoe sprint

World Championships
Bronze medal – third place	1994 Mexico City	K-4 200 m

Goodwill Games
Bronze medal – third place	1994 Saint Petersburg	K-2 500 m
Bronze medal – third place	1994 Saint Petersburg	K-2 1000 m

Andrey Petrov (sometimes listed as Andriy Petrov born March 29, 1971) is a Ukrainian sprint canoer who competed in the mid-1990s. He won a bronze medal in the K-4 200 m event at the 1994 ICF Canoe Sprint World Championships in Mexico City.

Petrov competed in the K-4 1000 m event at the 1996 Summer Olympics in Atlanta but was eliminated in the semifinals.
