= Olaf Winter =

German sprint canoeist

Medal record

Men's canoe sprint

Olympic Games
Gold medal – first place	1996 Atlanta	K-4 1000 m

World Championships
Bronze medal – third place	1999 Milan	K-2 1000 m

Olaf Winter (born 18 July 1973 in Neustrelitz, Bezirk Neubrandenburg) is a German sprint canoeist who competed in the late 1990s and early 2000s (decade). Competing in two Summer Olympics, he won a gold medal in the K-4 1000 m event at Atlanta in 1996.

Winter also won a bronze medal in the K-2 1000 m event at the 1999 ICF Canoe Sprint World Championships in Milan.

He represented the sports clubs WSV Einheit Neustrelitz, SC Neubrandenburg and KG Essen. He lives in Hattingen.
