= Attila Adrovicz =

Hungarian sprint canoer (born 1966)

Medal record

Men's canoe sprint

Olympic Games
| Silver medal – second place | 1996 Atlanta | K-4 1000 m |

World Championships
| Silver medal – second place | 1986 Montreal | K-2 500 m |
| Silver medal – second place | 1991 Paris | K-4 500 m |
| Silver medal – second place | 1994 Mexico City | K-2 500 m |
| Bronze medal – third place | 1989 Plovdiv | K-2 1000 m |

Attila Adrovicz (born 8 April 1966) is a Hungarian sprint canoer who competed from the late 1980s to the mid-1990s.

== Career ==
He won a silver medal in the K-4 1000 m event at the 1996 Summer Olympics in Atlanta.

Adrovicz also won four medals at the ICF Canoe Sprint World Championships with three silvers (K-2 500 m: 1986, 1994; K-4 500 m: 1991) and a bronze (K-2 1000 m: 1989).
