= Mihai Apostol =

Canadian sprint canoer

Mihai Apostol (born April 28, 1971) is a Canadian sprint canoer who competed from the early-1990s to the early 2000s. Apostol was born in Romania, but defected to Canada with two teammates while attending the 1989 world junior paddling championship in Dartmouth, Nova Scotia. He was 18 years old at the time. After defecting, Apostol took up residence in Halifax, Nova Scotia, and adapted well to life in Canada by making the Canadian National Kayak team in 1991 and moving from Halifax to Vancouver to join the rest of the team. In Vancouver, supporting himself and without the financial help that most of his teammates received from their families, Mihai worked part-time while attending college (Douglas College, New Westminster BC) and trained full-time with the National Team.

Despite moving to Vancouver, Apostol continued to represent Banook Canoe Club at the club level and eventually became a world-class sprint kayaker, excelling especially in shorter sprints. He achieved Canadian citizenship in 1994 making him eligible to compete for Canada at the Olympic Games. Competing in two Summer Olympics, he earned his best finish of seventh in the K-4 1000 m event at Atlanta in 1996. Apostol dedicated the 90's to the sport and won over 9 World Cup gold medals and 10 Canadian National Championship titles in various distances and events. Some of his international highlights are as follows:

- 1992: Gold medal Can/Am Knockout Championships, Florida-USA in K1-200m
- 1994: Gold medal World Cup Paris, France with Emanuel Auger in K2-200m
- 1996: Gold medal 'World Cup Szeged', Hungary in K1-200m
- 1996: Silver medal World Cup Szeged, Hungary in K4-200m
- 1996: Bronze medal World Cup Szeged, Hungry in K2-200m with Liam Jewel
- 1996: Gold medal World Cup Milano, Italy 1996 in K4-200 m with Renn Crichlow, Liam Jewel, Peter Giles
- 2001: Gold medal World Cup Gainesville, USA in K4-1000m with Adam Van Koeverden, Ryan Cuthbert, Dereck Bordeleau
- 2001: Gold medal World Cup Gainesville, USA in K4-200m with Ryan Cuthbert, Dereck Bordeleau, Adrian Richardson
- 2001: Gold medal 'World Cup Gainesville', USA in K2-500m with Nathan Luce
- 2001: Gold medal World Cup Gainesville, USA in K2-200m with Nathan Luce
- 2001: Gold medal World Cup Copenhagen, Denmark in K1-200m
- 2001: Bronze medal Duisburg International Kanu Regatta, Germany in K1-200m

Following his retirement as an Olympian in 2002, Mihai competed for several years with the Dragon Boat East dragon boat club. He also competed at the 2012 Canadian Masters Nationals sprint canoe-kayak championships, where he obtained four gold medals in various events.

Apostol now resides in Halifax, Nova Scotia with his wife and two kids.
