= Cliff Meidl =

American kayaker (born 1966)

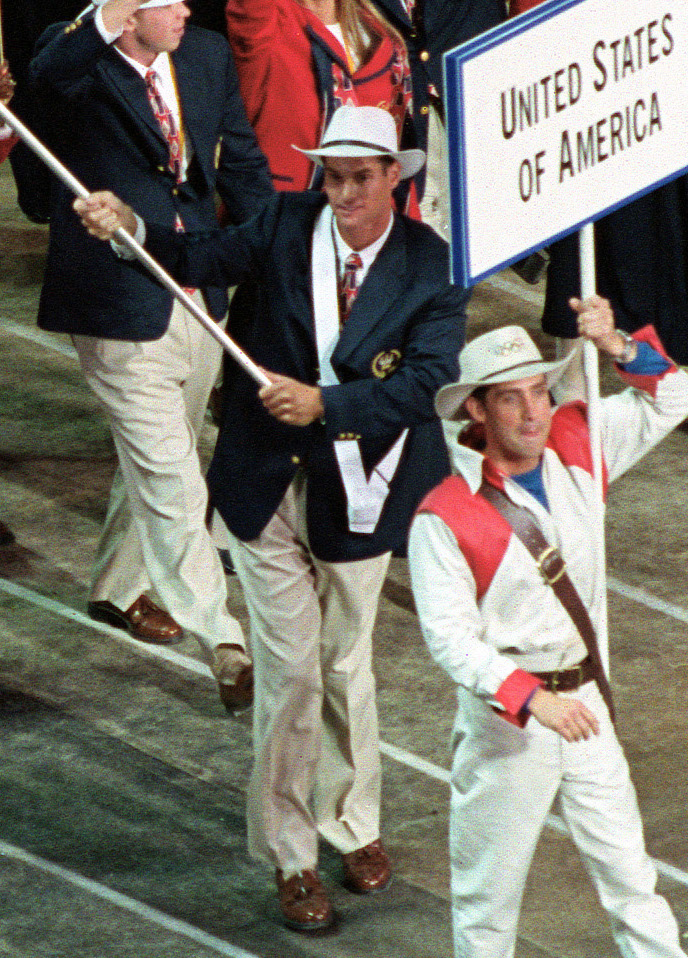
- Meidl (center) at the 2000 Olympics

Personal information
- Born: March 6, 1966 (age 60) Manhattan Beach, California, U.S.
- Height: 187 cm (6 ft 2 in)
- Weight: 86 kg (190 lb)

Sport
- Sport: Canoe sprint

Cliff Meidl (born March 6, 1966) is a retired American Sprint Kayaker. He competed in 1000 m kayak events at the 1996 and 2000 Summer Olympics. He was honored as the U.S. flag bearer at the 2000 Summer Olympics.

== Biography ==
A construction electrical accident at age 20 caused him injury so severe he almost lost his legs. In his battle to recover he competed in two Olympic Games in the sport of kayaking. Team USA honored him as the Opening Ceremony flag bearer leading the national team into the Olympic Stadium at the 2000 Sydney Summer Olympics. Meidl's story received significant television and press coverage during the Olympiad.

Meidl currently lives in southern California, where he works in asset management. He is a successful motivational speaker and member of the National Speakers Association. His motto is "Ad Astra Per Aspera" (Latin for: To The Stars Through Difficulties), and his speaking presentations focus on the universal topics of courage, hope, and achievement despite adversity.

Meidl attended El Camino Community college in Torrance, California before transferring to California State University, Long Beach, to complete his undergraduate degree in business administration. He completed his MBA at the University of Southern California. The two-time Olympian partners with foundations and 501(c3) organizations to advocate educational awareness, promote the sport of kayaking, and recognize individuals for exceptional effort, courage, and achievement in the midst of challenging circumstances.

Meidl is one of 20 athletes honored, alongside Peter Vidmar, Rafer Johnson, and Mark Spitz, in a special collectible set called the Olympian Heroes Series. The series was created to benefit the Olympians for Olympians Relief Fund (OORF).

Olympic Games
Preceded by Eric Flaim	Flagbearer for United States; Sydney 2000	Succeeded by Amy Peterson
