= Miguel García (canoeist) =

Spanish canoeist

Personal information
- Full name: Miguel García Fernández
- Born: 6 February 1973 (age 53) Luanco, Spain
Medal record
Men's canoe sprint
Representing Spain
World Championships
Bronze medal – third place	1994 Mexico City	K-1 200 m

Miguel García Fernández (born 6 February 1973, in Luanco) is a Spanish canoe sprinter who competed in the early to mid-1990s. He won a bronze medal in the K-1 200 m at the 1994 ICF Canoe Sprint World Championships in Mexico City and sprinted in two Summer Olympics, earning his best finish of fifth in the K-4 1000 m event at Atlanta in 1996.
