= Paw Madsen =

Swedish-born Danish sprint canoer (born 1972)

Paw Madsen (born 31 October 1972) is a Swedish-born Danish sprint canoer who competed from the mid-1990s to the mid-2000s (decade). He finished sixth for Sweden in the K-4 1000 m event at the 1996 Summer Olympics in Atlanta. Madsen competed for Denmark in the next two Summer Olympics, but was eliminated in the semifinals of all four events he competed.
