= Susanne Rosenqvist =

Swedish canoeist (born 1967)

Medal record

Women's canoe sprint

Olympic Games
Bronze medal – third place	1992 Barcelona	K-4 500 m
Bronze medal – third place	1996 Atlanta	K-4 500 m

World Championships
Silver medal – second place	1991 Paris	K-2 5000 m
Silver medal – second place	1993 Copenhagen	K-4 500 m
Silver medal – second place	1995 Duisburg	K-2 200 m
Bronze medal – third place	1994 Mexico City	K-4 500 m
Bronze medal – third place	1995 Duisburg	K-2 500 m
Bronze medal – third place	1995 Duisburg	K-4 200 m
Bronze medal – third place	1997 Dartmouth	K-4 200 m

Women's canoe marathon

World Championships
Gold medal – first place	1996 Vaxholm	K-2
Gold medal – first place	1998 Cape Town	K-2

Susanne Rosenqvist (born 26 November 1967) is a Swedish canoe sprinter and marathon canoeist who competed in the 1990s. Competing in two Summer Olympics, she won two bronze medals in the K-4 500 m event (1992, 1996).

Rosenqvist also won seven medals at the ICF Canoe Sprint World Championships with three silvers (K-2 200 m: 1995, K-2 5000 m: 1991, K-4 500 m: 1993) and four bronzes (K-2 500 m: 1995, K-4 200 m: 1995, 1997; K-4 500 m: 1994).
