= Jonas Fager =

Swedish sprint canoer

Medal record

Men's canoe sprint

World Championships
Bronze medal – third place	1991 Paris	K-4 10000 m

Jonas Fager (born 2 June 1969) is a Swedish sprint canoer who competed from the early 1990s to the early 2000s (decade). He won a bronze medal in the K-4 10000 m event at the 1991 ICF Canoe Sprint World Championships in Paris.

Fager also competed in three Summer Olympics, earning his best finish of sixth in the K-4 1000 m event at Atlanta in 1996.
