= Anders Svensson (canoeist) =

Swedish canoeist (born 1977)

Medal record

Men's canoe sprint

World Championships
Bronze medal – third place	1997 Dartmouth	K-4 500 m

European Championships
Bronze medal – third place	2011 Belgrade	K-2 200 m

Anders Svensson (born 9 June 1977) is a Swedish sprint canoeist who competed in the late 1990s and early 2000s. He won a bronze medal in the K-4 500 m event at the 1997 ICF Canoe Sprint World Championships in Dartmouth.

Svensson also competed in the K-1 500 m event at the 2000 Summer Olympics in Sydney, but was eliminated in the semifinals.
