= Thomas Reineck =

German sprint canoeist (born 1967)

Medal record

Men's canoe sprint

Olympic Games
Gold medal – first place	1992 Barcelona	K-4 1000 m
Gold medal – first place	1996 Atlanta	K-4 1000 m

World Championships
Gold medal – first place	1991 Paris	K-4 500 m
Gold medal – first place	1991 Paris	K-4 10000 m
Gold medal – first place	1993 Copenhagen	K-4 1000 m
Gold medal – first place	1993 Copenhagen	K-4 10000 m
Gold medal – first place	1995 Duisburg	K-4 1000 m
Silver medal – second place	1991 Paris	K-4 1000 m
Silver medal – second place	1993 Copenhagen	K-4 500 m
Silver medal – second place	1995 Duisburg	K-4 500 m
Bronze medal – third place	1986 Montreal	K-4 500 m
Bronze medal – third place	1987 Duisburg	K-4 500 m
Bronze medal – third place	1987 Dusiburg	K-4 10000 m
Bronze medal – third place	1994 Mexico City	K-4 1000 m
Bronze medal – third place	1995 Duisburg	K-4 200 m

Thomas Reineck (born 18 November 1967) is a German sprint canoeist who competed from the late 1980s to the mid-1990s. Competing in three Summer Olympics, he won two gold medals in the K-4 1000 m event, earning them in 1992 and 1996.

Reineck also won thirteen medals at the ICF Canoe Sprint World Championships with five golds (K-4 500 m: 1991, K-4 1000 m: 1993, 1995; K-4 10000 m: 1991, 1993), three silvers (K-4 500 m: 1993, 1995; K-4 1000 m: 1991), and five bronzes (K-4 200 m: 1995, K-4 500 m: 1986, 1987; K-4 1000 m: 1994, K-4 10000 m: 1987).
