= Bartosz Wolski (canoeist) =

Polish-born American canoeist

Bartosz Wolski (born April 6, 1980 in Kraków, Poland) is an American sprint canoer who competed in the mid-2000s. At the 2004 Summer Olympics in Athens, he was eliminated in the semifinals of the K-2 500 m event.
