= Botond Storcz =

Hungarian canoeist

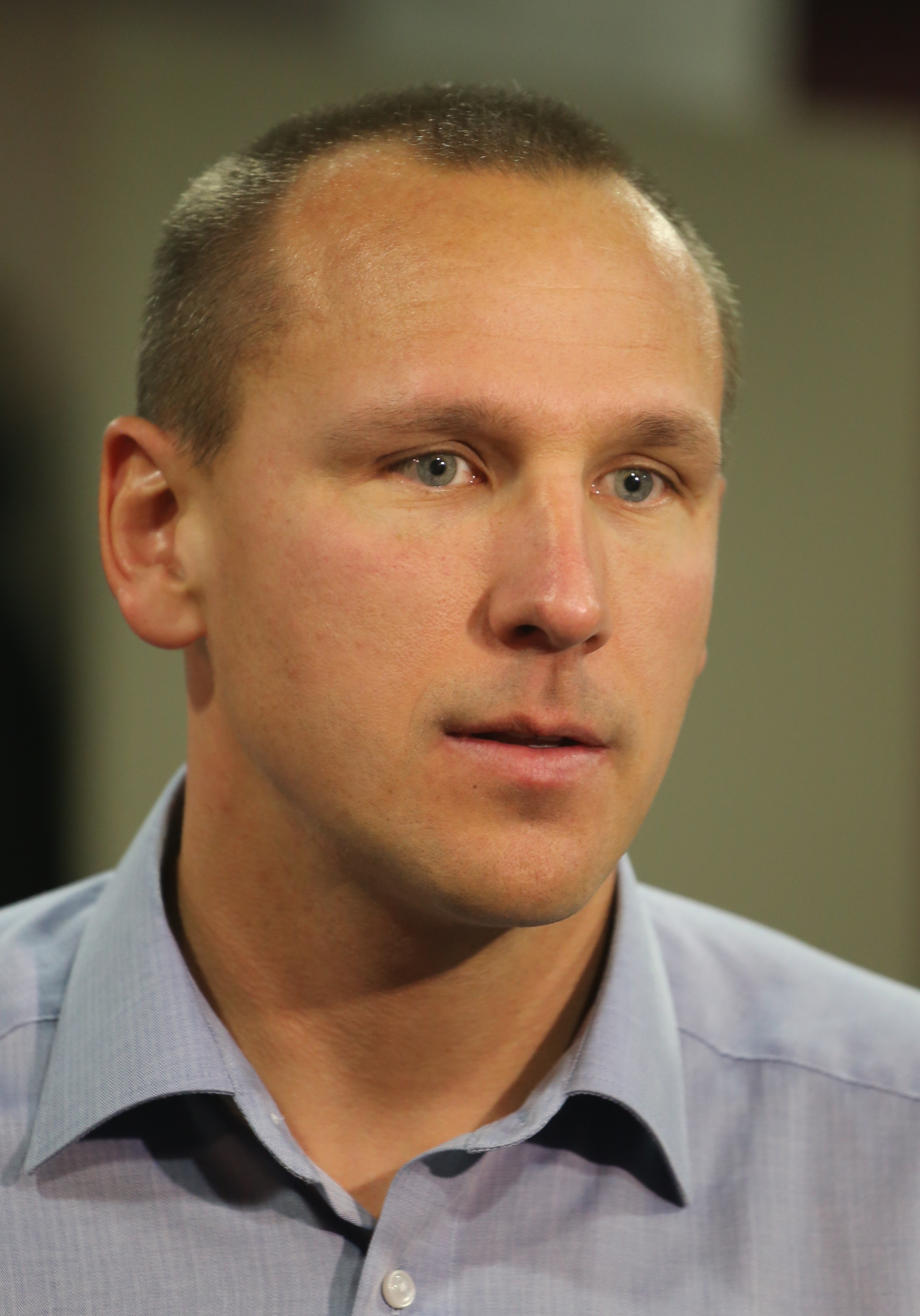
- Storcz in 2013

Personal information
- Born: 30 January 1975 (age 51) Budapest, Hungary
- Height: 183 cm (6 ft 0 in)
- Weight: 87 kg (192 lb)

Sport
- Sport: Canoe sprint
- Club: Magyar Testgyakorlók Köre; Démasz-Szeged; Budapest Honvéd FC
Medal record
Men's canoe sprint
Representing Hungary
Event	1st	2nd	3rd
Olympic Games	3	0	0
World Championships	4	5	2
European Championships	4	3	0
Total	11	8	2
Olympic Games
Gold medal – first place	2000 Sydney	K-2 500 m
Gold medal – first place	2000 Sydney	K-4 1000 m
Gold medal – first place	2004 Athens	K-4 1000 m
World Championships
Gold medal – first place	1997 Dartmouth	K-1 500 m
Gold medal – first place	1997 Dartmouth	K-1 1000 m
Gold medal – first place	1997 Dartmouth	K-4 500 m
Gold medal – first place	1999 Milan	K-4 1000 m
Silver medal – second place	1997 Dartmouth	K-4 1000 m
Silver medal – second place	1998 Szeged	K-4 500 m
Silver medal – second place	1998 Szeged	K-4 1000 m
Silver medal – second place	1999 Milan	K-2 500 m
Silver medal – second place	2001 Poznań	K-4 1000 m
Bronze medal – third place	1999 Milan	K-4 500 m
Bronze medal – third place	2002 Seville	K-2 500 m
Canoe Sprint European Championships
Gold medal – first place	1997 Plovdiv	K-1 500 m
Gold medal – first place	1997 Plovdiv	K-1 1000 m
Gold medal – first place	1997 Plovdiv	K-4 500 m
Gold medal – first place	2004 Poznań	K-4 1000 m
Silver medal – second place	2000 Poznań	K-4 1000 m

Botond Storcz (born 30 January 1975) is a retired Hungarian sprint canoeist. He competed at the 2000 and 2004 Olympics and won three gold medals (K-2 500 m: 2000, K-4 1000 m: 2000, 2004). He also won eleven medals at the ICF Canoe Sprint World Championships with four golds (K-1 500 m: 1997, K-1 1000 m: 1997, K-4 500 m: 1997, K-4 1000 m: 1999), five silvers (K-2 500 m: 1999, K-4 500 m: 1998, K-4 1000 m: 1997, 1998, 2001), and two bronzes (K-2 500 m: 2002, K-4 500 m: 1999).

Storcz was named Hungarian Sportsman of the Year in 1997 for winning three gold medals at that year's World Championships. He worked as a canoeing coach at the Hungarian University of Physical Education. Since 2009 he is the head coach of the Hungarian National Kayak Canoe Team.

== Awards ==
- Hungarian kayaker of the Year (2): 1997, 2000
- Hungarian Sportman of the Year (1) - votes of sports journalists: 1997
- Hungarian President of the Year (2) - votes of sports journalists: 2011, 2014

Orders and special awards

- Order of Merit of the Republic of Hungary – Officer's Cross (2000)
- Order of Merit of the Republic of Hungary – Commander's Cross (2004)
- Order of Merit of Hungary – Commander's Cross with Star (2012)

Awards
Preceded by István Kovács	Hungarian Sportsman of The Year; 1997	Succeeded by Tibor Gécsek
