= András Rajna =

Hungarian canoeist (born 1960)

Medal record

Men's canoe sprint

Olympic Games
Silver medal – second place	1996 Atlanta	K-4 1000 m

World Championships
Silver medal – second place	1986 Montreal	K-2 500 m
Silver medal – second place	1994 Mexico City	K-2 500 m
Bronze medal – third place	1983 Tampere	K-4 500 m

András Rajna (born September 3, 1960) is a Hungarian sprint canoer who competed from the early 1980s to the late 1990s. Competing in three Summer Olympics, he won a silver medal in the K-4 1000 m event at Atlanta in 1996.

Rajna also won three medals at the ICF Canoe Sprint World Championships with two silvers (K-2 500 m: 1986, 1994) and a bronze (K-4 500 m: 1983).
