= Renn Crichlow =

Canadian sprint kayaker

Medal record

Men's canoe sprint

World Championships
Gold medal – first place	1991 Paris	K-1 500 m
Silver medal – second place	1993 Copenhagen	K-1 500 m
Bronze medal – third place	1995 Duisburg	K-1 200 m

Renn Crichlow (born May 9, 1968) is a Canadian sprint kayaker who competed from the late 1980s to the late 1990s. He won a complete set of medals at the ICF Canoe Sprint World Championships with gold (K-1 500 m: 1991), a silver (K-1 500 m: 1993), and a bronze (K-1 200 m: 1995).

Crichlow also competed in three Summer Olympics, earning his best finish of seventh in the K-4 1000 m event at Atlanta in 1996.

Crichlow was born in Ottawa, Ontario, and grew up in the Ottawa suburb of Nepean. He pursued many sports and eventually found his way to the Rideau Canoe Club. He won his first Canadian Canoe Association National Championship at the age of 16. Crichlow went on to become Canada's most successful male sprint kayaker up to that time. He was the first Canadian male kayaker to win a medal at the Junior World Championships and the first to win a World Championship gold.

In 1995, Crichlow was admitted to Harvard Medical School and began his training as a medical doctor, while still active as an international competitor in canoe-kayak. After completing his medical studies, Crichlow moved to Indianapolis to begin practicing medicine as an orthopaedic surgeon.

The trophy given annually to the winner of the CanoeKayak Canada national sprint championship in Men's U17 K-1 1000m is named in Crichlow's honour. He and his K-4 teammates from the 1996 Olympic Games were used as the models for the sculpture on the David M. Smith Memorial Trophy awarded to the national champions in U19 Men's K-4 1000m.
