= Dimitar Atanasov (canoeist) =

Bulgarian sprint canoer

Medal record

Men's canoe sprint

World Championships
Bronze medal – third place	1995 Duisburg	C-4 500 m

Dimitar Atanasov (Bulgarian: Димитър Атанасов) is a Bulgarian sprint canoer who competed in the mid-1990s. He won a bronze medal in the C-4 500 m event at the 1995 ICF Canoe Sprint World Championships in Duisburg.
