= Thomas Holm Jakobsen =

Danish sprint canoer

Medal record

Men's canoe sprint

World Championships
Silver medal – second place	1997 Dartmouth	K-2 1000 m

Thomas Holm Jakobsen is a Danish sprint canoer who competed in the late 1990s. He won a silver medal in the K-2 1000 m event at the 1997 ICF Canoe Sprint World Championships in Dartmouth, Nova Scotia.
