= Geza Magyar =

Romanian canoeist

Medal record

Men's canoe sprint

World Championships
Silver medal – second place	1994 Mexico City	K-4 200 m
Silver medal – second place	1994 Mexico City	K-4 500 m
Silver medal – second place	2001 Poznań	K-4 500 m
Bronze medal – third place	1995 Duisburg	K-1 500 m
Bronze medal – third place	1998 Szeged	K-2 200 m

Geza Magyar (born March 4, 1973, in Hodod) is a Romanian sprint canoer who competed in from the early 1990s to the early 2000s (decade). He is a national champion in Romania, and he competed in national races for 16 years and earned medals in each race. Additionally, he won five medals at the ICF Canoe Sprint World Championships with three silvers (K-4 200 m: 1994, K-4 500 m: 1994, 2001) and two bronzes (K-1 500 m: 1995, K-2 200 m: 1998).

Magyar also competed in three Summer Olympics, earning his best finish of fourth in the K-1 500 m event at Atlanta in 1996.

Magyar graduated from the University of Physical Education and Sport in Bacau, Romania in 2002. He earned a degree in teaching.

After his retirement, Magyar began coaching elite teen athletes. He has coached a group of individually selected athletes from around the country, 15 of whom earned places on the National Romanian Junior Team. Overall, 17 of the athletes Magyar coached won medals at the Romanian Nationals in the junior category, 4 athletes earned places on the Senior National Team, and 4 athletes placed on the National Youth Team.
