= Sebastian Szubski =

Brazilian canoeist (born 1981)

Personal information
- Born: April 26, 1981 (age 45) Bydgoszcz, Poland

Sport
- Sport: Canoeing
Medal record
Representing Brazil
Pan American Games
Silver medal – second place	2003 Santo Domingo	K4 1000m

Sebastian Dominik Szubski (born April 26, 1981, in Bydgoszcz, Poland) is a Brazilian sprint canoer who competed in the mid-2000s. At the 2004 Summer Olympics in Athens, he was eliminated in the semifinals of the K-2 500 m event. He represent club Astoria Bydgoszcz. He is the son of Zdzisław Szubski.
