= Pavel Mráz (canoeist) =

Czech sprint canoer (born 1974)

Pavel Mráz (born 18 June 1974 in Ústí nad Labem) is a Czech sprint canoeist who competed in the mid-1990s. He was eliminated in the semifinals of the K-4 1000 m event at the 1996 Summer Olympics in Atlanta.
