= Detlef Hofmann =

German sprint canoeist (born 1963)

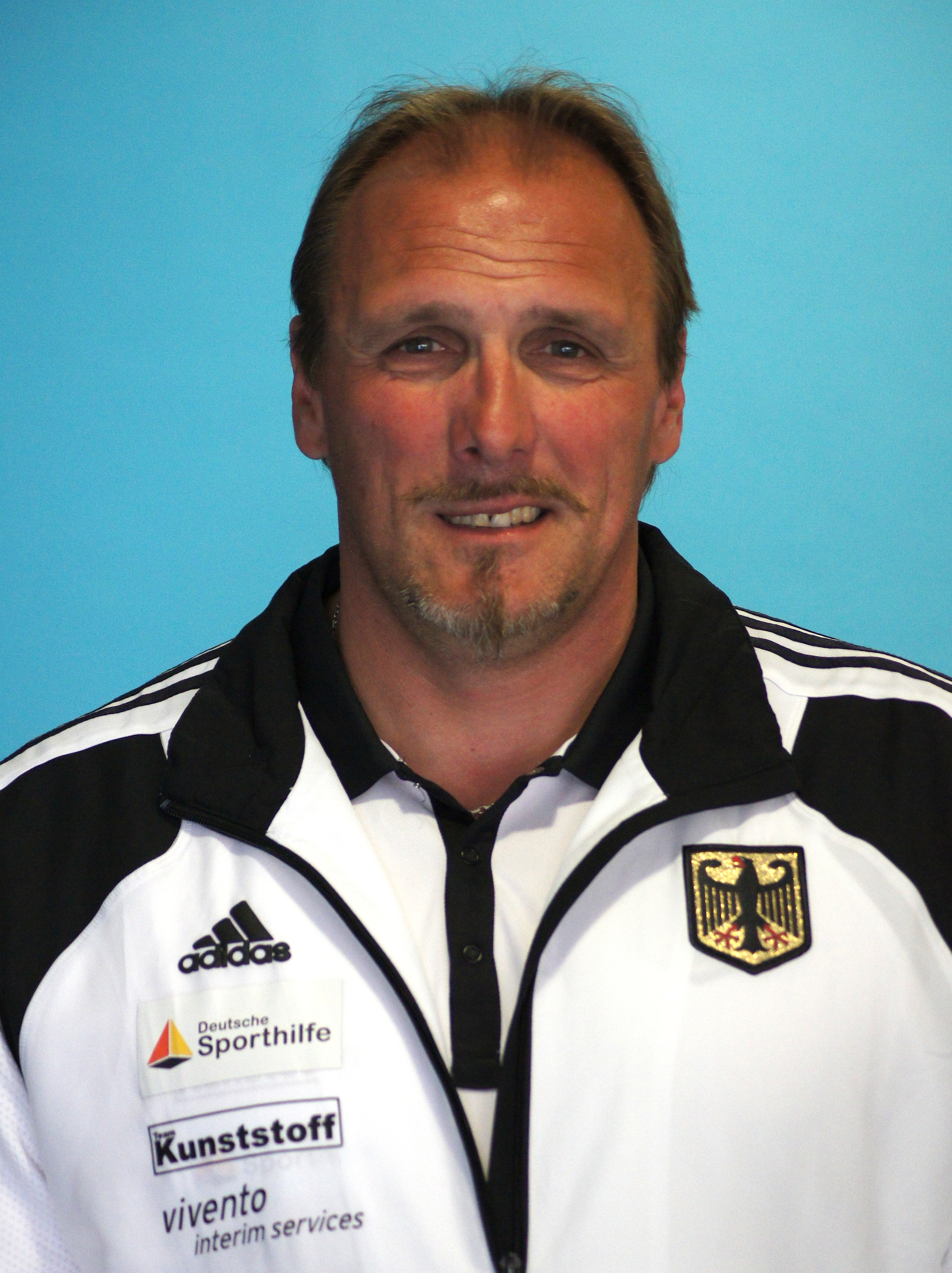

Medal record

Men's canoe sprint

Olympic Games
Gold medal – first place	1996 Atlanta	K-4 1000 m

World Championships
Gold medal – first place	1991 Paris	K-4 500 m
Gold medal – first place	1991 Paris	K-4 10000 m
Gold medal – first place	1995 Duisburg	K-4 1000 m
Silver medal – second place	1991 Paris	K-4 1000 m
Silver medal – second place	1995 Duisburg	K-4 500 m

Detlef Hofmann (born 12 November 1963 in Karlsruhe) is a German sprint canoeist who competed from the late 1980s to the late 1990s. He won a gold medal in the K-4 1000 m event at the 1996 Summer Olympics in Atlanta.

Hofmann won five medals at the ICF Canoe Sprint World Championships with three golds (K-4 500 m: 1991, K-4 1000 m: 1995, K-4 10000 m: 1991) and two silvers (K-4 500 m: 1995, K-4 1000 m: 1991).

In May 1992, Hofmann was caught for doping after testing positive for testosterone and kicked off the team. He would return after the 1992 Summer Olympics to compete.
