= Paweł Łakomy =

Polish canoeist

Medal record

Representing Poland

Men's canoe sprint

World Championships
Silver medal – second place	1999 Milan	K-4 200 m

Paweł Łakomy (born 1975) is a Polish sprint canoer who competed in the late 1990s. He won a silver medal in the K-4 200 m event at the 1999 ICF Canoe Sprint World Championships in Milan.
