= Jovino González =

Spanish canoeist

Jovino González (born October 16, 1975) is a Spanish sprint canoer who competed from the mid-1990s to the early 2000s (decade). Competing in two Summer Olympics, he earned his best finish of fifth in the K-4 1000 m event at Atlanta in 1996.
