= Henrik Nilsson (canoeist) =

Swedish canoeist (born 1976)

Medal record

Men's canoe sprint

Olympic Games
Gold medal – first place	2004 Athens	K-2 1000 m
Silver medal – second place	2000 Sydney	K-2 1000 m

World Championships
Gold medal – first place	2002 Seville	K-2 1000 m
Gold medal – first place	2003 Gainesville	K-2 1000 m
Silver medal – second place	2011 Szeged	K-2 1000 m
Bronze medal – third place	1997 Dartmouth	K-2 200 m
Bronze medal – third place	1997 Dartmouth	K-4 500 m
Bronze medal – third place	2001 Poznań	K-2 500 m

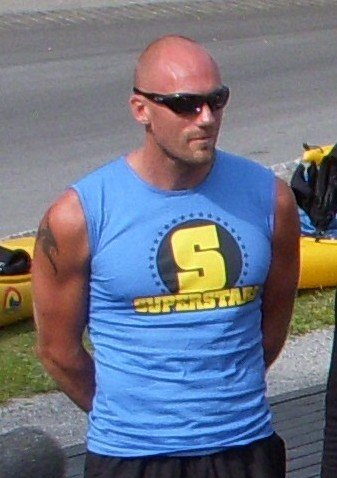
Henrik Nilsson 2009

Henrik Nilsson (born 15 February 1976, in Nyköping) is a Swedish sprint canoer who competed from the mid-1990s to the 2010s. Competing in four Summer Olympics, he won two medals in the K-2 1000 m event with a gold in 2004 and a silver in 2000.

Nilsson's first international medal came at the 1997 World Championships in Dartmouth, Canada, where he won the K-2 200 m bronze medal with partner Henrik Andersson.

His greatest triumphs however came with partner Markus Oscarsson. In 2001, they were world championship bronze medalists in K-2 500 m.

Nilsson and Oscarsson then dominated the K-2 1000 m event over the next three years, winning two world championship gold medals, in Seville (2002) and Gainesville, USA (2003), followed by the Olympic gold at Athens 2004.

Nilsson is 190 cm tall (6' 3) and weighs 86 kg (189 lbs).
