= Zdzisław Szubski =

Polish sprint canoer (born 1958)

Medal record

Men's canoe sprint

World Championships
Silver medal – second place	1978 Belgrade	K-4 10000 m
Silver medal – second place	1979 Duisburg	K-4 10000 m
Silver medal – second place	1981 Nottingham	K-4 10000 m
Bronze medal – third place	1977 Sofia	K-4 10000 m

Zdzisław Szubski (born 26 January 1958 in Grudziądz) is a Polish sprint canoer who competed in the late 1970s and early 1980s. He won four medals in the K-4 10000 m at the ICF Canoe Sprint World Championships with three silvers (1978, 1979, 1981) and a bronze (1977). He represent club Astoria Bydgoszcz. Father of Sebastian Szubski.

Szubski also finished seventh in the K-2 500 m event at the 1980 Summer Olympics in Moscow.
