= Damián Vindel =

Spanish canoeist (born 1981)

Damián Vindel Marín (born 5 May 1981 in Lleida) is a Spanish canoe sprint canoer who competed in the mid-2000s. At the 2004 Summer Olympics in Athens, he finished sixth in the Canoeing at the 2004 Summer Olympics – Men's K-2 500 metresK-2 500 m event.
