= Brian Morton (canoeist) =

Australian sprint canoeist (born 1970)

Brian Morton (born 1 January 1970) is an Australian sprint canoeist who competed from the mid-1990s to the early 2000s (decade). He competed in four World Sprint Canoe Championships, 1995–1999 and two Summer Olympics; Atlanta 1996 and Sydney 2000. He earned his best finish of third in the Men's K-4 1000m event in the 1997 World Sprint Canoe Championships in Nova Scotia, Canada. His best Olympic placing was ninth in the K-4 1000 m event at Atlanta in 1996.
