= Oleg Gorobiy =

Russian canoeist

Medal record

Men's canoe sprint

Olympic Games

Representing Russia
Bronze medal – third place	1996 Atlanta	K-4 1000 m

World Championships

Representing Soviet Union
Gold medal – first place	1990 Poznań	K-4 500 m
Bronze medal – third place	1991 Paris	K-4 500 m

Representing Russia
Gold medal – first place	1993 Copenhagen	K-4 500 m
Gold medal – first place	1994 Mexico City	K-4 200 m
Gold medal – first place	1994 Mexico City	K-4 500 m
Gold medal – first place	1994 Mexico City	K-4 1000 m
Gold medal – first place	1995 Duisburg	K-4 500 m
Gold medal – first place	1997 Dartmouth	K-4 200 m
Silver medal – second place	1995 Duisburg	K-4 200 m
Bronze medal – third place	1993 Copenhagen	K-4 1000 m
Bronze medal – third place	1999 Milan	K-4 200 m
Bronze medal – third place	2001 Poznań	K-4 1000 m
Bronze medal – third place	2003 Gainesville	K-4 500 m

Oleg Gorobiy (Russian: Олег Горобий), born 7 February 1971 in Voronezh, is a Russian canoe sprinter who competed from 1990 to 2003. Competing in three Summer Olympics, he won a bronze medal in the K-4 1000 m event at Atlanta in 1996.

Gorobiy won thirteen medals at the ICF Canoe Sprint World Championships with seven golds (K-4 200 m: 1994, 1997; K-4 500 m: 1990, 1993, 1994, 1995; K-4 1000 m: 1994), a silver (K-4 200 m: 1995), and five bronzes (K-4 200 m: 1999, K-4 500 m: 1991, 2003; K-4 1000 m: 1993, 2001).

In 2004 he joined the national Dragon boat squad as a helmsman, winning four gold medals at the 2004 European championships at Stockton-on-Tees, England.

Height: 1.91 m (6 ft 3 in), race weight: 94 kg (207 lb).
