= Henrik Andersson (canoeist) =

Swedish canoeist

Medal record

Men's canoe sprint

World Championships
Bronze medal – third place	1997 Dartmouth	K-2 200 m
Bronze medal – third place	1997 Dartmouth	K-4 500 m

Henrik Andersson is a Swedish sprint canoer who competed in the late 1990s. He won two bronze medals at the 1997 ICF Canoe Sprint World Championships in Dartmouth, earning them in the K-2 200 m and K-4 500 m events.
