= Piotr Markiewicz =

Polish canoeist (born 1973)

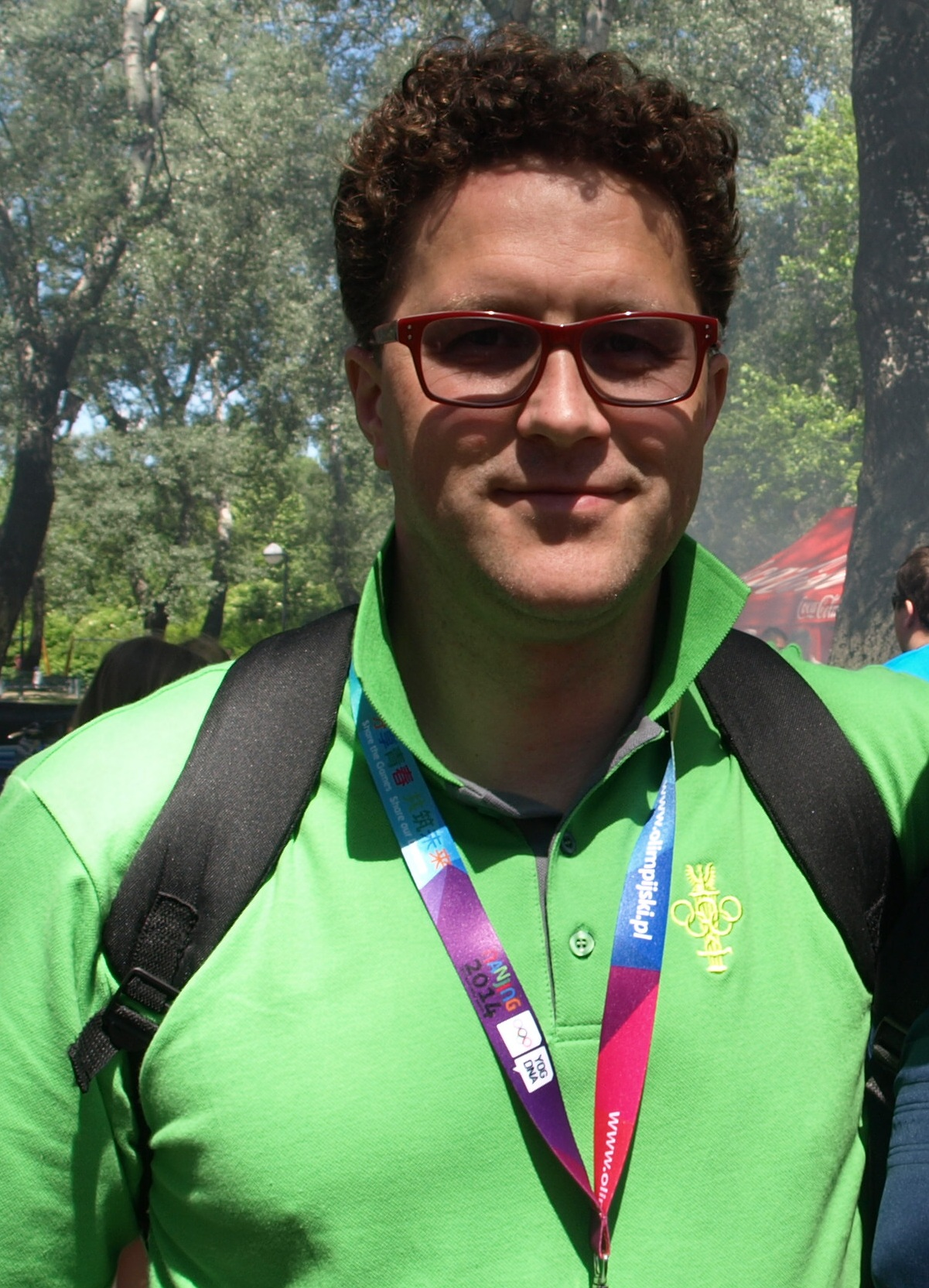

Medal record

Men's canoe sprint
Event	1st	2nd	3rd
Olympic Games	0	0	1
World Championships	2	3	0
European Championships	0	0	3
Total	2	3	3

Olympic Games
Bronze medal – third place	1996 Atlanta	K-1 500 m

World Championships
Gold medal – first place	1995 Duisburg	K-1 200 m
Gold medal – first place	1995 Duisburg	K-1 500 m
Silver medal – second place	1993 Copenhagen	K-4 10000 m
Silver medal – second place	1994 Mexico City	K-4 1000 m
Silver medal – second place	1999 Milan	K-4 200 m

European Championships
Bronze medal – third place	1997 Plovdiv	K4-200 m
Bronze medal – third place	1997 Plovdiv	K4-1000 m

Piotr Markiewicz (born 23 September 1973 in Sejny, Podlaskie) is a Polish sprint canoeist who competed from the early 1990s to the early 2000s (decade). At the 1996 Summer Olympics in Atlanta, he won the bronze medal in the K-1 500 m event.

Known for his devastating sprint finish, Markiewicz won his first national champion 1993. Initially representing in the K-4 event, he won two medals in the K-4 events at the ICF Canoe Sprint World Championships with silvers in 1993 (K-4 10000 m) and 1994 (K-4 1000 m).

Markiewicz's personality better suited him to the individual K-1 events where he won the K-1 200 m and K-1 500 m events at the 1995

As reigning world champion, he went to the 1996 Games as favorite in the K-1 500 m event, but did not live up to expectations. Markiewicz ended up settling for bronze in the K-1 500 m event after finishing fourth in the K-4 1000 m event.

After the Olympics, he won his last medal in 1999 with a silver medal in the K-4 200 m event. Markiewicz retired in 2001 after a car accident.

Markiewicz was a member of the Sparta Augustów club. He is 184 cm (6 ft 0 in) tall and raced at 84 kg (185 lb).

For his sport achievements, he received:
Silver Cross of Merit in 1996.
