= Sergey Verlin =

Russian canoeist

Medal record

Men's canoe sprint

Olympic Games
Bronze medal – third place	1996 Atlanta	K-4 1000 m

World Championships
Gold medal – first place	1994 Mexico City	K-4 200 m
Gold medal – first place	1994 Mexico City	K-4 500 m
Gold medal – first place	1995 Duisburg	K-4 500 m
Gold medal – first place	1997 Dartmouth	K-4 200 m
Silver medal – second place	1995 Duisburg	K-4 200 m
Silver medal – second place	1998 Szeged	K-2 200 m
Bronze medal – third place	1993 Copenhagen	K-4 10000 m
Bronze medal – third place	1998 Szeged	K-4 1000 m

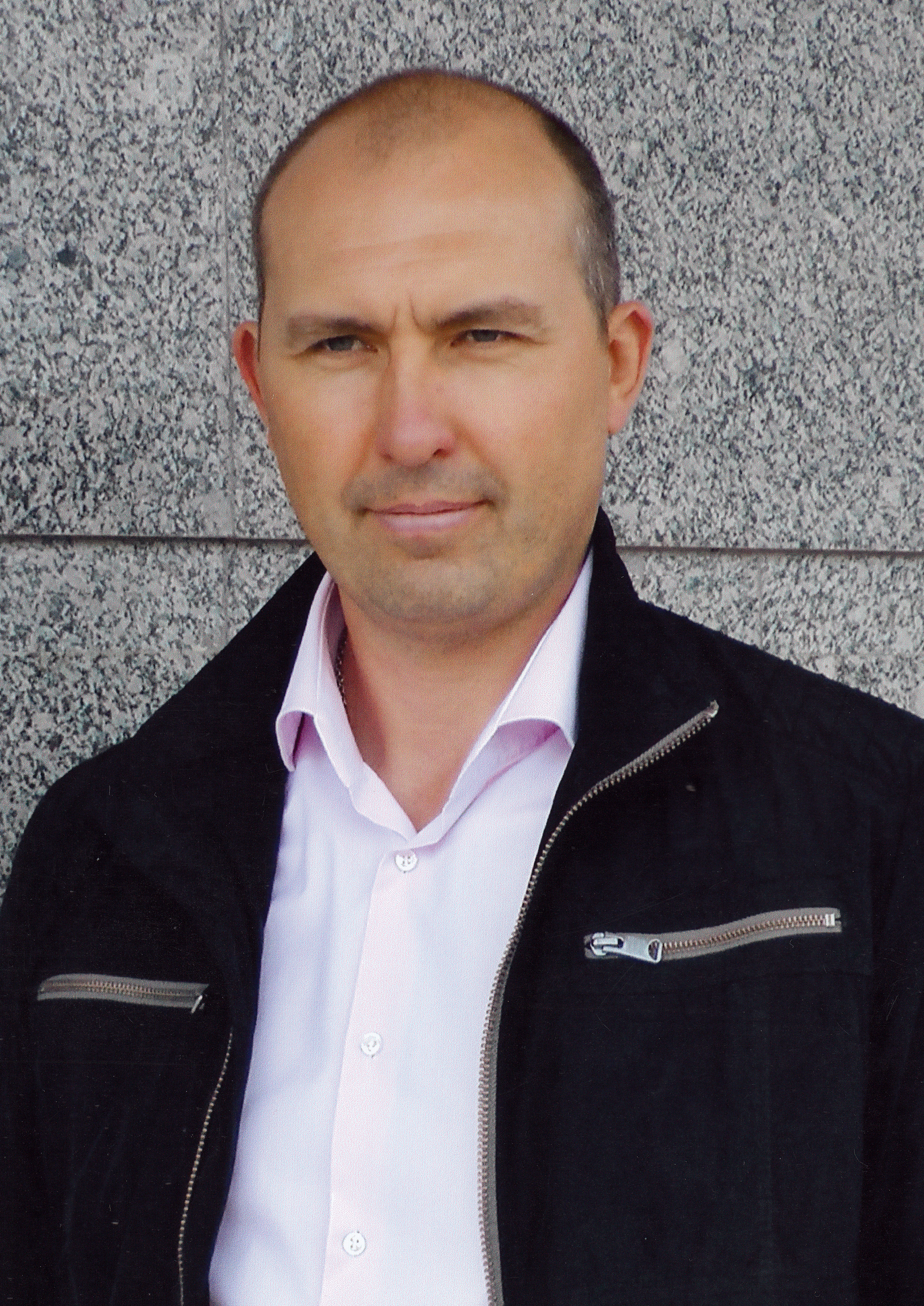
Sergey Verlin in 2013

Sergey Verlin (Сергей Верлин; born 12 October 1974 in Voronezh) is a Russian sprint canoeist who competed in the mid-to-late 1990s. He won a bronze medal in the K-4 1000 m event at the 1996 Summer Olympics in Atlanta.

Verlin also won seven medals at the ICF Canoe Sprint World Championships with four golds (K-4 200 m: 1994, 1997; K-4 500 m: 1994, 1995), two silvers (K-2 200 m: 1998, K-4 500 m: 1995), and a bronze (K-4 1000 m: 1998).

After retiring, Verlin went into politics, standing as a candidate for the United Russia party of Vladimir Putin. Since 2004 he has been a coach of the Russian national kayak squad.
