= Anatoly Tishchenko =

Russian canoeist

Medal record

Men's canoe sprint

Olympic Games

Representing Russia
Bronze medal – third place	1996 Atlanta	K-4 1000 m

World Championships

Representing Soviet Union
Gold medal – first place	1990 Poznań	K-2 500 m
Silver medal – second place	1989 Plovdiv	K-2 500 m
Silver medal – second place	1990 Poznań	K-4 1000 m

Representing Russia
Gold medal – first place	1993 Copenhagen	K-4 500 m
Gold medal – first place	1994 Mexico City	K-4 200 m
Gold medal – first place	1994 Mexico City	K-4 500 m
Gold medal – first place	1994 Mexico City	K-4 1000 m
Gold medal – first place	1995 Duisburg	K-4 500 m
Gold medal – first place	1997 Dartmouth	K-4 200 m
Silver medal – second place	1995 Duisburg	K-4 200 m
Silver medal – second place	1998 Szeged	K-2 200 m
Bronze medal – third place	1993 Copenhagen	K-4 1000 m
Bronze medal – third place	1998 Szeged	K-4 1000 m
Bronze medal – third place	1999 Milan	K-4 200 m
Bronze medal – third place	2003 Gainesville	K-4 500 m

Anatoly Tishchenko (Russian: Анатолий Анатольевич Тищенко; born 18 July 1970, in Taganrog) is a Russian sprint canoer who competed from 1989 to 2004. Competing in four Summer Olympics, he won a bronze in the K-4 1000 m event at Atlanta in 1996.

Tishchenko also won a total of fifteen medals at the ICF Canoe Sprint World Championships with seven golds (K-2 500 m: 1990, K-4 200 m: 1994, 1997; K-4 500 m: 1993, 1994, 1995; K-4 1000 m: 1994), four silvers (K-2 200 m: 1998, K-2 500 m: 1989, K-4 200 m: 1995, K-4 1000 m: 1990), and four bronzes (K-4 200 m: 1999, K-4 500 m: 2003, K-4 1000 m: 1993, 1998).
