= Canoeing at the 1996 Summer Olympics – Men's K-2 1000 metres =

Men's K-2 1000 metres at the Games of the XXVI Olympiad
- Venue: Lake Lanier
- Dates: 30 July 1996 (heats & repechage); 1 August 1996 (semifinals); 3 August 1996 (final)
- Competitors: 24 boats from 24 nations
- Winning time: 3:09.190

Medalists
1st place, gold medalist(s)		Antonio Rossi; Daniele Scarpa	Italy
2nd place, silver medalist(s)		Kay Bluhm; Torsten Gutsche	Germany
3rd place, bronze medalist(s)		Andrian Dushev; Milko Kazanov	Bulgaria

The men's K-2 1000 metres event was a pairs kayaking event conducted as part of the Canoeing at the 1996 Summer Olympics program.

== Medalists ==
Gold	Silver	Bronze
Antonio Rossi and Daniele Scarpa (ITA)	Kay Bluhm and Torsten Gutsche (GER)	Andrian Dushev and Milko Kazanov (BUL)

== Results ==
=== Heats ===
24 crews entered in three heats. The top three finishers from each of the heats advanced directly to the semifinals while the remaining teams were relegated to the repechages.

Heat 1
1.	Antonio Rossi and Daniele Scarpa (ITA)	3:33.786	QS
2.	Grzegorz Kotowicz and Dariusz Białkowski (POL)	3:37.986	QS
3.	Andrian Dushev and Milko Kazanov (BUL)	3:39.914	QS
4.	Petr Hruška and René Kučera (CZE)	3:42.682	QR
5.	Juan José Román and Juan Manuel Sánchez (ESP)	3:43.970	QR
6.	Juraj Kadnár and Attila Szabó (SVK)	3:49.026	QR
7.	Yevgeny Yegorov and Sergey Skrypnik (KAZ)	3:50.394	QR
8.	Xu Haifeng and Wu Yubiao (CHN)	3:50.978	QR
9.	Rui Fernandes and Joaquim Queiróz (POR)	3:59.390	QR
Heat 2
1.	Kay Bluhm and Torsten Gutsche (GER)	3:39.388	QS
2.	Thor Nielsen and Jesper Staal (DEN)	3:41.640	QS
3.	Grayson Bourne and Paul Darby-Dowman (GBR)	3:43.384	QS
4.	Peter Newton and John Mooney (USA)	3:46.852	QR
5.	Javier Correa and Abelardo Sztrum (ARG)	3:49.864	QR
6.	Gary Mawer and Conor Maloney (IRL)	4:03.432	QR
7.	Andrey Mitkovets and Yury Ulyachenko (KGZ)	4:08.916	QR
Heat 3
1.	Peter Scott and Grant Leury (AUS)	3:40.114	QS
2.	Pierre Lubac and Patrick Lancereau (FRA)	3:40.198	QS
3.	Róbert Hegedűs and Péter Almási (HUN)	3:40.754	QS
4.	Staffan Malmsten and Markus Oscarsson (SWE)	3:44.174	QR
5.	David Taboreau and Mark Vendeweyer (BEL)	3:44.778	QR
6.	Aleksandr Ivanik and Andrey Tisin (RUS)	3:46.558	QR
7.	Vidas Kupčinskas and Vaidas Mizeras (LTU)	3:51.842	QR
8.	Rafayel Islamov and Vladimir Alimdyanov (UZB)	4:01.522	QR

=== Repechages ===
The top four crews in each of the two repechages and the fastest fifth-place finisher advanced to the semifinals.

Repechage 1
1.	Javier Correa and Abelardo Sztrum (ARG)	3:34.244	QS
2.	Staffan Malmsten and Markus Oscarsson (SWE)	3:34.480	QS
3.	Petr Hruška and René Kučera (CZE)	3:35.216	QS
4.	Vidas Kupčinskas and Vaidas Mizeras (LTU)	3:38.428	QS
5.	Yevgeny Yegorov and Sergey Skrypnik (KAZ)	3:40.040
6.	Gary Mawer and Conor Maloney (IRL)	3:40.656
7.	Xu Haifeng and Wu Yubiao (CHN)	3:41.196
8.	Rafayel Islamov and Vladimir Alimdyanov (UZB)	3:43.320
Repechage 2
1.	Peter Newton and John Mooney (USA)	3:34.424	QS
2.	Juraj Kadnár and Attila Szabó (SVK)	3:34.436	QS
3.	Aleksandr Ivanik and Andrey Tisin (RUS)	3:35.200	QS
4.	Juan José Román and Juan Manuel Sánchez (ESP)	3:36.264	QS
5.	Rui Fernandes and Joaquim Queiróz (POR)	3:36.488	QS
6.	David Taboreau and Mark Vendeweyer (BEL)	3:36.976
7.	Andrey Mitkovets and Yury Ulyachenko (KGZ)	3:44.200

=== Semifinals ===
The top four finishers in each of the two semifinals and the fastest fifth-place finisher advanced to the final.

Semifinal 1
1.	Antonio Rossi and Daniele Scarpa (ITA)	3:16.848	QF
2.	Thor Nielsen and Jesper Staal (DEN)	3:17.420	QF
3.	Andrian Dushev and Milko Kazanov (BUL)	3:18.480	QF
4.	Róbert Hegedűs and Péter Almási (HUN)	3:18.524	QF
5.	Peter Scott and Grant Leury (AUS)	3:19.056	QF
6.	Juraj Kadnár and Attila Szabó (SVK)	3:20.904
7.	Petr Hruška and René Kučera (CZE)	3:21.384
8.	Juan José Román and Juan Manuel Sánchez (ESP)	3:24.032
9.	Javier Correa and Abelardo Sztrum (ARG)	3:28.128
Semifinal 2
1.	Grzegorz Kotowicz and Dariusz Białkowski (POL)	3:18.026	QF
2.	Pierre Lubac and Patrick Lancereau (FRA)	3:18.722	QF
3.	Kay Bluhm and Torsten Gutsche (GER)	3:19.394	QF
4.	Staffan Malmsten and Markus Oscarsson (SWE)	3:19.606	QF
5.	Peter Newton and John Mooney (USA)	3:19.834
6.	Rui Fernandes and Joaquim Queiróz (POR)	3:22.270
7.	Aleksandr Ivanik and Andrey Tisin (RUS)	3:22.306
8.	Vidas Kupčinskas and Vaidas Mizeras (LTU)	3:24.462
9.	Grayson Bourne and Paul Darby-Dowman (GBR)	3:25.346

=== Final ===
The final was held on August 3.

Gold	Antonio Rossi and Daniele Scarpa (ITA)	3:09.190
Silver	Kay Bluhm and Torsten Gutsche (GER)	3:10.518
Bronze	Andrian Dushev and Milko Kazanov (BUL)	3:11.206
4.	Grzegorz Kotowicz and Dariusz Białkowski (POL)	3:11.262
5.	Pierre Lubac and Patrick Lancereau (FRA)	3:11.402
6.	Thor Nielsen and Jesper Staal (DEN)	3:12.054
7.	Peter Scott and Grant Leury (AUS)	3:13.054
8.	Staffan Malmsten and Markus Oscarsson (SWE)	3:14.182
9.	Róbert Hegedűs and Péter Almási (HUN)	3:14.282

Germany led the first half of the race, but could not match the finishing power of the Italians. Scarpa, competing in his fourth Olympics, won a silver in the men's K-2 500 m event the following day.
