= Canoeing at the 2000 Summer Olympics – Men's K-2 500 metres =

The men's K-2 500 metres event was a pairs kayaking event conducted as part of the Canoeing at the 2000 Summer Olympics program.

== Medalists ==
Gold	Silver	Bronze
Zoltán Kammerer and Botond Storcz (HUN)	Daniel Collins and Andrew Trim (AUS)	Ronald Rauhe and Tim Wieskötter (GER)

== Results ==
=== Heats ===
19 crews were entered into the event. The top finishers from each of the three heats advanced directly to the finals while the remaining teams were relegated to the semifinals.

Heat 1 of 3 Date: Wednesday 27 September 2000
Place	Overall	Nation	Athletes	Time	Qual.
1	3	Germany	Ronald Rauhe and Tim Wieskötter	1:30.502	QF
2	7	Poland	Marek Twardowski and Adam Wysocki	1:32.350	QS
3	9	Great Britain	Paul Darby-Dowman and Ross Sabberton	1:32.782	QS
4	14	United States	Peter Newton and Angel Pérez	1:33.646	QS
5	16	Israel	Rami Zur and Ro'l Yellin	1:34.774	QS
6	17	Russia	Roman Zarubin and Aleksandr Ivanik	1:35.212	QS
7	19	Brazil	Sebastián Cuattrin and Carlos Campos	1:35.662	QS

Heat 2 of 3 Date: Wednesday 27 September 2000
Place	Overall	Nation	Athletes	Time	Qual.
1	4	Hungary	Zoltán Kammerer and Botond Storcz	1:30.502	QF
2	5	Slovakia	Juraj Bača and Michal Riszdorfer	1:32.026	QS
3	10	France	Bâbak Amir-Tahmasseb and Philippe Aubertin	1:32.902	QS
4	12	Romania	Vasile Curuzan and Romică Șerban	1:33.184	QS
5	13	Czech Republic	Radek Záruba and Pavel Holubář	1:33.490	QS
6	15	Bulgaria	Petar Sibinkić and Milko Kazanov	1:33.682	QS

Heat 3 of 3 Date: Wednesday 27 September 2000
Place	Overall	Nation	Athletes	Time	Qual.
1	1	Sweden	Henrik Nilsson and Markus Oscarsson	1:30.051	QF
2	2	Australia	Andrew Trim and Daniel Collins	1:30.393	QS
3	6	Italy	Antonio Rossi and Beniamino Bonomi	1:32.902	QS
4	8	Denmark	Paw Madsen and Jesper Staal	1:32.617	QS
5	11	Lithuania	Egidijus Balčiūnas and Alvydas Duonėla	1:32.931	QS
6	18	Norway	Eirik Verås Larsen and Nils Olav Fjeldheim	1:35.619	QS

Overall Results Heats

Heats Overall Results
Place	Athlete	Nation	Heat	Place	Time	Qual.
1	Sweden	Henrik Nilsson and Markus Oscarsson	3	1	1:30.051	QF
2	Australia	Andrew Trim and Daniel Collins	3	2	1:30.393	QS
3	Germany	Ronald Rauhe and Tim Wieskötter	1	1	1:30.502	QF
4	Hungary	Zoltán Kammerer and Botond Storcz	2	1	1:31.144	QF
5	Slovakia	Juraj Bača and Michal Riszdorfer	2	2	1:32.026	QS
6	Italy	Antonio Rossi and Beniamino Bonomi	3	3	1:32.193	QS
7	Poland	Marek Twardowski and Adam Wysocki	1	2	1:32.350	QS
8	Denmark	Paw Madsen and Jesper Staal	3	4	1:32.617	QS
9	Great Britain	Paul Darby-Dowman and Ross Sabberton	1	3	1:32.782	QS
10	France	Bâbak Amir-Tahmasseb and Philippe Aubertin	2	3	1:32.902	QS
11	Lithuania	Egidijus Balčiūnas and Alvydas Duonėla	3	5	1:32.931	QS
12	Romania	Vasile Curuzan and Romică Șerban	2	4	1:33.184	QS
13	Czech Republic	Radek Záruba and Pavel Holubář	2	5	1:33.490	QS
14	United States	Peter Newton and Angel Pérez	1	4	1:33.646	QS
15	Bulgaria	Petar Sibinkić and Milko Kazanov	2	6	1:33.682	QS
16	Israel	Rami Zur and Ro'l Yellin	1	5	1:34.774	QS
17	Russia	Roman Zarubin and Aleksandr Ivanik	1	6	1:35.212	QS
18	Norway	Eirik Verås Larsen and Nils Olav Fjeldheim	3	6	1:35.619	QS
19	Brazil	Sebastián Cuattrin and Carlos Campos	1	7	1:35.662	QS

=== Semifinals ===
The top three finishers in each of the two semifinals advanced to the final.

Heat 1 of 2 Date: Friday 29 September 2000
Place	Overall	Nation	Athletes	Time	Qual.
1	4	Australia	Andrew Trim and Daniel Collins	1:31.475	QF
2	6	Bulgaria	Petar Sibinkić and Milko Kazanov	1:31.919	QF
3	8	France	Bâbak Amir-Tahmasseb and Philippe Aubertin	1:32.597	QF
4	9	Denmark	Paw Madsen and Jesper Staal	1:32.867	
5	10	Russia	Roman Zarubin and Aleksandr Ivanik	1:32.963	
6	11	Romania	Vasile Curuzan and Romică Șerban	1:32.975	
7	13	Great Britain	Paul Darby-Dowman and Ross Sabberton	1:33.173	
8	14	Israel	Rami Zur and Ro'l Yellin	1:34.241	

Heat 2 of 2 Date: Friday 29 September 2000
Place	Overall	Nation	Athletes	Time	Qual.
1	1	Italy	Antonio Rossi and Beniamino Bonomi	1:29.886	QF
2		Poland	Marek Twardowski and Adam Wysocki	1:30.026	QF
3		United States	Peter Newton and Angel Pérez	1:31.082	QF
4		Slovakia	Juraj Bača and Michal Riszdorfer	1:31.484	
5		Lithuania	Egidijus Balčiūnas and Alvydas Duonėla	1:32.084	
6		Czech Republic	Radek Záruba and Pavel Holubář	1:33.056	
7		Norway	Eirik Verås Larsen and Nils Olav Fjeldheim	1:34.712	
8		Brazil	Sebastián Cuattrin and Carlos Campos	1:34.868	

Overall Results Heats

Heats Overall Results
Place	Athlete	Nation	Heat	Place	Time	Qual.
1	Italy	Antonio Rossi and Beniamino Bonomi	2	1	1:29.886	QF
2	Poland	Marek Twardowski and Adam Wysocki	2	2	1:31.082	QF
3	United States	Peter Newton and Angel Pérez	2	3	1:30.502	QF
4	Australia	Andrew Trim and Daniel Collins	1	1	1:31.475	QF
5	Slovakia	Juraj Bača and Michal Riszdorfer	2	4	1:31.484	
6	Bulgaria	Petar Sibinkić and Milko Kazanov	1	2	1:32.193	QF
7	Lithuania	Egidijus Balčiūnas and Alvydas Duonėla	2	5	1:32.084	
8	France	Bâbak Amir-Tahmasseb and Philippe Aubertin	1	3	1:32.597	QF
9	Denmark	Paw Madsen and Jesper Staal	1	4	1:32.867	
10	Russia	Roman Zarubin and Aleksandr Ivanik	1	5	1:32.963	
11	Romania	Vasile Curuzan and Romică Șerban	1	6	1:32.975	
12	Czech Republic	Radek Záruba and Pavel Holubář	2	6	1:33.056	
13	Great Britain	Paul Darby-Dowman and Ross Sabberton	1	7	1:33.173	
14	Israel	Rami Zur and Ro'l Yellin	1	8	1:34.241	
15	Norway	Eirik Verås Larsen and Nils Olav Fjeldheim	2	7*	1:34.712	
16	Brazil	Sebastián Cuattrin and Carlos Campos	2	8	1:34.868	

=== Final ===
Heat 1 of 1 Date: Sunday 1 October 2000
Place	Nation	Athletes	Time
1st place, gold medalist(s)	Hungary	Zoltán Kammerer and Botond Storcz	1:47.055
2nd place, silver medalist(s)	Australia	Andrew Trim and Daniel Collins	1:47.895
3rd place, bronze medalist(s)	Germany	Ronald Rauhe and Tim Wieskötter	1:48.771
4	France	Bâbak Amir-Tahmasseb and Philippe Aubertin	1:48.921
5	Poland	Marek Twardowski and Adam Wysocki	1:48.963
6	United States	Peter Newton and Angel Pérez	1:52.617
7	Italy	Antonio Rossi and Beniamino Bonomi	1:52.635
8	Bulgaria	Petar Sibinkić and Milko Kazanov	1:52.725
9	Sweden	Henrik Nilsson and Markus Oscarsson	1:56.301

The race was delayed five hours by wind gusts of 40 mph (64 km/h), which happened three times in the event alone. Because of the winds, the waters were as choppy as those used for the whitewater course. Australia moved from third to first with 50 meters left, only to have the Hungarians surge ahead at the finish to win the race. The winning time was 16 seconds slower than that of the qualifying heats four days earlier due to the adverse weather conditions.
