= Canoeing at the 1996 Summer Olympics – Men's K-2 500 metres =

Men's K-2 500 metres at the Games of the XXVI Olympiad
- Venue: Lake Lanier
- Dates: 31 July 1996 (heats & repechage); 2 August 1996 (semifinals); 4 August 1996 (final)
- Competitors: 23 boats from 23 nations
- Winning time: 1:28.697

Medalists
1st place, gold medalist(s)		Kay Bluhm; Torsten Gutsche	Germany
2nd place, silver medalist(s)		Beniamino Bonomi; Daniele Scarpa	Italy
3rd place, bronze medalist(s)		Daniel Collins; Andrew Trim	Australia

The men's K-2 500 metres event was a pairs kayaking event conducted as part of the Canoeing at the 1996 Summer Olympics program that took place at Lake Lanier.

== Medalists ==
Gold	Silver	Bronze
Kay Bluhm and Torsten Gutsche (GER)	Beniamino Bonomi and Daniele Scarpa (ITA)	Daniel Collins and Andrew Trim (AUS)

== Results ==
=== Heats ===
23 crews were entered into the event. The top three finishers from each of the three heats advanced directly to the semifinals while the remaining teams were relegated to the repechages.

Heat 1
1.	Beniamino Bonomi and Daniele Scarpa (ITA)	1:31.491	QS
2.	Maciej Freimut and Adam Wysocki (POL)	1:32.463	QS
3.	Jovino González and Gregorio Vicente (ESP)	1:32.791	QS
4.	Markus Oscarsson and Staffan Malmsten (SWE)	1:33.411	QR
5.	Rui Fernandes and Joaquim Queiróz (POR)	1:33.859	QR
6.	Karel Leština and Jiří Polívka (CZE)	1:34.107	QR
7.	Akram Yurabayev and Vitaly Anosov (UZB)	1:39.291	QR
Heat 2
1.	Kay Bluhm and Torsten Gutsche (GER)	1:31.361	QS
2.	Daniel Collins and Andrew Trim (AUS)	1:31.433	QS
3.	Oleg Gorobiy and Anatoli Tishchenko (RUS)	1:31.859	QS
4.	Thor Nielsen and Jesper Staal (DEN)	1:32.641	QR
5.	Vidas Kupčinskas and Vaidas Mizeras (LTU)	1:36.685	QR
6.	Milko Kazanov and Andrian Dushev (BUL)	1:36.801	QR
7.	Xu Haifeng and Wu Yubiao (CHN)	1:37.677	QR
8.	Ilfat Gatyatullin and Dmitry Torlopov (KAZ)	1:37.833	QR
Heat 3
1.	Zsolt Gyulay and Krisztián Bártfai (HUN)	1:32.030	QS
2.	Daniel Stoian and Romică Șerban (ROU)	1:32.926	QS
3.	Stein Jorgensen and John Mooney (USA)	1:33.642	QS
4.	Roberto Heinze Flamand and Ralph Heinze (MEX)	1:36.918	QR
5.	David Taboureau and Mark Vendeweyer (BEL)	1:37.118	QR
6.	Diego Cánepa and Sergio Mangín (ARG)	1:38.594	QR
7.	Conor Maloney and Gary Mawer (IRL)	1:43.074	QR
8.	Andrey Mitkovets and Yury Uliachenko (KGZ)	1:43.722	QR

=== Repechages ===
The 14 crews raced in two repechages. The top four finishers from each repechage and the fastest fifth-place finisher advanced directly to the semifinals.

Repechage 1
1.	Milko Kazanov and Andrian Dushev (BUL)	1:37.928	QS
2.	Markus Oscarsson and Staffan Malmsten (SWE)	1:39.716	QS
3.	Vidas Kupčinskas and Vaidas Mizeras (LTU)	1:40.500	QS
4.	Akram Yurabayev and Vitaly Anosov (UZB)	1:42.524	QS
5.	Roberto Heinze Flamand and Ralph Heinze (MEX)	1:42.848
6.	Andrey Mitkovets and Yury Uliachenko (KGZ)	1:44.324
7.	Conor Maloney and Gary Mawer (IRL)	1:44.375
Repechage 2
1.	Thor Nielsen and Jesper Staal (DEN)	1:36.419	QS
2.	Karel Leština and Jiří Polívka (CZE)	1:37.119	QS
3.	Rui Fernandes and Joaquim Queiróz (POR)	1:37.499	QS
4.	Diego Cánepa and Sergio Mangín (ARG)	1:39.535	QS
5.	David Taboureau and Mark Vendeweyer (BEL)	1:39.619	QS
6.	Ilfat Gatyatullin and Dmitry Torlopov (KAZ)	1:40.215
7.	Xu Haifeng and Wu Yubiao (CHN)	1:41.035

=== Semifinals ===
The top four finishers in each of the two semifinals and the faster fifth-place finisher advanced to the final.

Semifinal 1
1.	Beniamino Bonomi and Daniele Scarpa (ITA)	1:29.661	QF
2.	Daniel Collins and Andrew Trim (AUS)	1:29.937	QF
3.	Milko Kazanov and Andrian Dushev (BUL)	1:30.641	QF
4.	Zsolt Gyulay and Krisztián Bártfai (HUN)	1:30.725	QF
5.	Jovino González and Gregorio Vicente (ESP)	1:31.137
6.	Stein Jorgensen and John Mooney (USA)	1:32.253
7.	Karel Leština and Jiří Polívka (CZE)	1:32.517
8.	Vidas Kupčinskas and Vaidas Mizeras (LTU)	1:32.693
9.	Diego Cánepa and Sergio Mangín (ARG)	1:37.177
Semifinal 2
1.	Kay Bluhm and Torsten Gutsche (GER)	1:29.883	QF
2.	Oleg Gorobiy and Anatoli Tishchenko (RUS)	1:30.031	QF
3.	Maciej Freimut and Adam Wysocki (POL)	1:30.243	QF
4.	Daniel Stoian and Romică Șerban (ROU)	1:30.611	QF
5.	Thor Nielsen and Jesper Staal (DEN)	1:30.659	QF
6.	Rui Fernandes and Joaquim Queiróz (POR)	1:31.559
7.	Markus Oscarsson and Staffan Malmsten (SWE)	1:31.811
8.	David Taboureau and Mark Vendeweyer (BEL)	1:34.807
9.	Akram Yurabayev and Vitaly Anosov (UZB)	1:35.543

=== Final ===
The final was held on August 4.

Gold	Kay Bluhm and Torsten Gutsche (GER)	1:28.697
Silver	Beniamino Bonomi and Daniele Scarpa (ITA)	1:28.729
Bronze	Daniel Collins and Andrew Trim (AUS)	1:29.409
4.	Oleg Gorobiy and Anatoli Tishchenko (RUS)	1:29.677
5.	Maciej Freimut and Adam Wysocki (POL)	1:29.937
6.	Zsolt Gyulay and Krisztián Bártfai (HUN)	1:30.001
7.	Daniel Stoian and Romică Șerban (ROU)	1:30.063
8.	Milko Kazanov and Andrian Dushev (BUL)	1:30.513
9.	Thor Nielsen and Jesper Staal (DEN)	1:30.753

Hungary led for the first part of the race before fading, leaving the Germans in first. Italy moved ahead fifty meters from the finish before Germany pulled even again with ten meters left to edge ahead and defend their title.
