= Canoeing at the 2000 Summer Olympics – Men's K-4 1000 metres =

The men's K-4 1000 metres event was a fours kayaking event conducted as part of the Canoeing at the 2000 Summer Olympics program.

== Medalists ==
Gold	Silver	Bronze
Hungary; Ákos Vereckei; Gábor Horváth; Zoltán Kammerer; Botond Storcz	Germany; Jan Schäfer; Mark Zabel; Björn Bach; Stefan Ulm	Poland; Grzegorz Kotowicz; Adam Seroczyński; Dariusz Białkowski; Marek Witkowski

== Results ==
=== Heats ===
13 crews entered in two heats. The top three finishers in each heat advanced to the final while the remaining teams competed in the semifinal.

Heat 1 of 2 Date: Tuesday 26 September 2000
Place	Overall	Nation	Athletes	Time	Qual.
1	1	Hungary	Ákos Vereckei, Zoltán Kammerer, Gábor Horváth, and Botond Storcz	2:58.096	QF
2	3	Russia	Anatoli Tishchenko, Oleg Gorobiy, Yevgeny Salakhov, and Roman Zarubin	2:59.764	QF
3	4	Poland	Dariusz Białkowski, Grzegorz Kotowicz, Adam Seroczyński, and Marek Witkowski	3:00.166	QF
4	5	Bulgaria	Milko Kazanov, Petar Merkov, Yordan Yordanov, and Petar Sibinkić	3:00.634	QS
5	9	Sweden	Jonas Fager, Anders Gustafsson, Erik Lindeberg, and Niklaes Persson	3:04.420	QS
6	10	FR Yugoslavia	Igor Kovačić, Saša Vujanić, Jozef Soti, and Dragan Zorić	3:04.432	QS
7	12	France	Frédéric Gauthier, Maxime Boccon, Pierre Lubac, and Stéphane Gourichon	3:05.806	QS

Heat 2 of 2 Date: Tuesday 26 September 2000
Place	Overall	Nation	Athletes	Time	Qual.
1	2	Germany	Björn Bach, Jan Schäfer, Stefan Ulm, and Mark Zabel	2:59.473	QF
2	6	Slovakia	Róbert Erban, Richard Riszdorfer, Juraj Tarr, and Erik Vlček	3:00.955	QF
3	7	United States	Stein Jorgensen, John Mooney, Peter Newton, and Angel Pérez	3:01.369	QF
4	8	Czech Republic	Karel Leština, Pavel Hottmar, Pavel Holubář, and Jiří Polívka	3:02.053	QS
5	11	Romania	Vasile Curuzan, Sorin Petcu, Romică Șerban, and Marian Sîrbu	3:05.341	QS
6	13	Australia	Ross Chaffer, Shane Suska, Peter Scott, and Cameron McFadzean	3:05.893	QS

Overall Results Heats

Heats Overall Results
Place	Athlete	Nation	Heat	Place	Time	Qual.
1	Hungary	Ákos Vereckei, Zoltán Kammerer, Gábor Horváth, and Botond Storcz	1	1	2:58.096	QF
2	Germany	Björn Bach, Jan Schäfer, Stefan Ulm, and Mark Zabel	2	1	2:59.764	QF
3	Russia	Anatoli Tishchenko, Oleg Gorobiy, Yevgeny Salakhov, and Roman Zarubin	1	2	2:59.764	QF
4	Poland	Dariusz Białkowski, Grzegorz Kotowicz, Adam Seroczyński, and Marek Witkowski	1	3	3:00.166	QF
5	Bulgaria	Milko Kazanov, Petar Merkov, Yordan Yordanov, and Petar Sibinkić	1	4	3:00.634	QS
6	Slovakia	Róbert Erban, Richard Riszdorfer, Juraj Tarr, and Erik Vlček	2	2	3:00.955	QF
7	United States	Stein Jorgensen, John Mooney, Peter Newton, and Angel Pérez	2	3	3:01.369	QF
8	Czech Republic	Karel Leština, Pavel Hottmar, Pavel Holubář, and Jiří Polívka	2	4	3:02.053	QS
9	Sweden	Jonas Fager, Anders Gustafsson, Erik Lindeberg, and Niklaes Persson	1	5	3:04.420	QS
10	FR Yugoslavia	Igor Kovačić, Saša Vujanić, Jozef Soti, and Dragan Zorić	1	6	3:04.432	QS
11	Romania	Vasile Curuzan, Sorin Petcu, Romică Șerban, and Marian Sîrbu	2	5	3:05.341	QS
12	France	Frédéric Gauthier, Maxime Boccon, Pierre Lubac, and Stéphane Gourichon	1	7	3:05.806	QS
13	Australia	Ross Chaffer, Shane Suska, Peter Scott, and Cameron McFadzean	2	6	3:05.893	QS

Yugoslavia is shown as Serbia and Montenegro (SCG) in the sports-reference.com website.

=== Semifinals ===
The top three finishers in the semifinal advanced to the final.

Heat 1 of 1 Date: Thursday 28 September 2000
Place	Nation	Athletes	Time	Qual.
1	Bulgaria	Milko Kazanov, Petar Merkov, Yordan Yordanov, and Petar Sibinkić	3:01.051	QF
2	Sweden	Jonas Fager, Anders Gustafsson, Erik Lindeberg, and Niklaes Persson	3:02.611	QF
3	FR Yugoslavia	Igor Kovačić, Saša Vujanić, Jozef Soti, and Dragan Zorić	3:02.713	QF
4	Czech Republic	Karel Leština, Pavel Hottmar, Pavel Holubář, and Jiří Polívka	3:02.851	
5	France	Frédéric Gauthier, Maxime Boccon, Pierre Lubac, and Stéphane Gourichon	3:03.703	
6	Romania	Vasile Curuzan, Sorin Petcu, Romică Șerban, and Marian Sîrbu	3:05.101	
7	Australia	Ross Chaffer, Shane Suska, Peter Scott, and Cameron McFadzean	3:05.527	

=== Final ===
Heat 1 of 1 Date: Saturday 30 September 2000
Place	Athlete	Nation	Time
1st place, gold medalist(s)	Hungary	Ákos Vereckei, Zoltán Kammerer, Gábor Horváth, and Botond Storcz	2:55.188
2nd place, silver medalist(s)	Germany	Björn Bach, Jan Schäfer, Stefan Ulm, and Mark Zabel	2:55.704
3rd place, bronze medalist(s)	Poland	Dariusz Białkowski, Grzegorz Kotowicz, Adam Seroczyński, and Marek Witkowski	2:57.192
4	Slovakia	Róbert Erban, Richard Riszdorfer, Juraj Tarr, and Erik Vlček	2:57.696
5	Bulgaria	Milko Kazanov, Petar Merkov, Yordan Yordanov, and Petar Sibinkić	2:59.112
6	United States	Stein Jorgensen, John Mooney, Peter Newton, and Angel Pérez	2:59.472
7	Russia	Anatoli Tishchenko, Oleg Gorobiy, Yevgeny Salakhov, and Roman Zarubin	2:59.778
8	Sweden	Jonas Fager, Anders Gustafsson, Erik Lindeberg, and Niklaes Persson	3:01.326
9	FR Yugoslavia	Igor Kovačić, Saša Vujanić, Jozef Soti, and Dragan Zorić	3:02.316

Germany won the K-4 1000 m world championships in 1997 and 1998 while Hungary won in 1999. Germany won the European championships in July 2000, but the Hungarians won the Olympic final by about 2.5 meter (8 feet).
