= Canoeing at the 1995 Pan American Games =

The canoeing competitions at the 1995 Pan American Games took place in Mar Del Plata, Argentina.

== Medal table ==
Place	Nation	Gold medal	Silver medal	Bronze medal	Total
1	United States	5	4	0	9
2	Cuba	4	2	3	9
3	Canada	2	4	1	7
4	Argentina	2	0	4	6
5	Mexico	0	3	3	6
6	Brazil	0	0	2	2
Total		13	13	13	39

== Men's events ==
Event	Gold	Silver	Bronze
C-1 500 metres	Jim Terrell; United States	Attila Buday; Canada	Juan Martínez; Mexico
C-1 1000 metres	Ledis Frank Balceiro; Cuba	Juan Martínez; Mexico	Danny Howe; Canada
C-2 500 metres	Canada; Danny Howe; Mike Oryschak	Mexico; Antonio Romero; Ramón Ferrer	Cuba; Juan Aballí; Fernando Zamora
C-2 1000 metres	Cuba; José Yordi; Ibrahim Rojas	Canada; Tamas Buday; Attila Buday	Mexico; Juan Martínez; Ramón Ferrer
K-1 500 metres	Peter Newton; United States	Emmanuel Auger; Canada	Sergio Mangín; Argentina
K-1 1000 metres	Abelardo Sztrum; Argentina	Peter Newton; United States	Sebastián Cuattrin; Brazil
K-2 500 metres	United States; Peter Newton; Stein Jorgensen	Cuba; Marcelino Cipriano; Luís Pérez Ramos	Argentina; Diego Cánepa; Sergio Mangín
K-2 1000 metres	Argentina; Abelardo Sztrum; Javier Correa	Cuba; Marcelino Cipriano; Luís Pérez Ramos	Brazil; Sebastián Cuattrin; Álvaro Koslowski
K-4 500 metres	Cuba; Marcelino Cipriano; Luís Pérez Ramos; Rafael Varona Reyes; Yoani Ventura Cruz	United States; Christopher Ball; Curt Bader; Mike Herbert; Michael Harbold	Argentina; Abelardo Sztrum; Diego Cánepa; Ariel Basualto; Javier Correa
K-4 1000 metres	Cuba; Marcelino Cipriano; Luís Pérez Ramos; Rafael Varona Reyes; Yoani Ventura Cruz	United States; Mike Herbert; Michael Harbold; Chris Barlow; Stein Jorgensen	Argentina; Javier Correa; Juan Labrin; Fernando Ortíz; Sergio Mangín

== Women's events ==
Event	Gold	Silver	Bronze
K-1 500 metres	Alexandra Harbold; United States	Erika Duron; Mexico	Anmary López; Cuba
K-2 500 metres	United States; DeAnne Hemmens; Traci Phillips	Canada; Kelly O'Leary; Marie-Josée Gilbeau	Mexico; Renata Hernández; Sandra Rojas
K-4 500 metres	Canada; Catharine Breckenridge; Jessica Ferguson; Marie-Josée Gilbeau; Danica Rice	United States; DeAnne Hemmens; Traci Phillips; Alexandra Harbold; Kathy Hendrickson-Bor	Cuba; Mirlenis Aguilera; Anmary López; Mariela Suárez Resino; Yamilé Ley
