= Zaruba =

Zaruba or Záruba (Czech feminine: Zárubová) is a surname of Czech origin. It may refer to:

- Adam Zaruba (born 1991), Canadian football player
- Gary E. Zaruba (1940–2014), American painter and art educator
- Jerzy Zaruba (1891–1971), Polish graphic artist, stage scenographer and caricaturist
- Karl Zaruba (1902–1978), Austrian composer
- Radek Záruba (born 1979), Czech sprint canoer

== See also ==
- Zaruba, a character in the Japanese series Garo
