= Ireland at the 1996 Summer Olympics =

- IOC code: IRL
- NOC: Olympic Federation of Ireland
- Website: olympics.ie

in Atlanta
- Competitors: 78 (62 men and 16 women) in 13 sports
- Flag bearer: Francie Barrett
- Medals Ranked 28th: Gold 3 Silver 0 Bronze 1 Total 4

Summer Olympics appearances (overview)
- 1924; 1928; 1932; 1936; 1948; 1952; 1956; 1960; 1964; 1968; 1972; 1976; 1980; 1984; 1988; 1992; 1996; 2000; 2004; 2008; 2012; 2016; 2020; 2024

Other related appearances
- Great Britain (1896–1920)

Ireland competed at the 1996 Summer Olympics in Atlanta, Georgia, in the United States.

== Medalists ==
Ireland won three gold and one bronze medal at the 1996 Olympics, the highest number ever, and was placed 28th in the medals table. Sonia O'Sullivan, who was seen as the best medal chance prior to the competition, did not win a medal.

Michelle Smith was accused of doping, though the accusations were not substantiated at the time. Two years after the Atlanta Games, FINA banned Smith for four years for tampering with her urine sample using alcohol; the testers also found traces of a metabolic precursor of testosterone, Androstenedione. Smith was not stripped of her medals, as the test upon which the ban was based was conducted well after the Games. Her achievements at the Games remain controversial.

Medal	Name	Sport	Event
Gold	Michelle Smith	Swimming	Women's 400 metres Freestyle
Gold	Michelle Smith	Swimming	Women's 200 metres Individual Medley
Gold	Michelle Smith	Swimming	Women's 400 metres Individual Medley
Bronze	Michelle Smith	Swimming	Women's 200 metres Butterfly

== Results by event ==
=== Archery ===
Ireland again sent only one archer to the Olympics. Keith Hanlon won his first match, but was defeated in the second round.

Men

Athlete	Event	Ranking round		Round of 64	Round of 32	Round of 16	Quarterfinals	Semifinals	Finals	
Athlete	Event	Score	Seed	Opposition Result	Opposition Result	Opposition Result	Opposition Result	Opposition Result	Opposition Result	Rank
Keith Hanlon	Individual	650	34	Koprivnikar (SLO) (31); W 155–151	Jang (KOR) (2); L 159–165	did not advance				

=== Athletics ===
Men

Athlete	Events	Heat		Quarterfinal		Semifinal		Final	
Athlete	Events	Result	Rank	Result	Rank	Result	Rank	Result	Rank
Neil Ryan	100 m	10.78	7	did not advance					
Gary Ryan	200 m	20.78	3 Q	20.89	8	did not advance			
Eugene Farrell	400 m	47.18	6	did not advance					
David Matthews	800 m	1:46.76	4 Q	—		1:47.83	5	did not advance	
Niall Bruton	1500 m	3:37.42	3 Q	—		3:42.88	12	did not advance	
Shane Healy	1500 m	3:37.28	5 Q	—		3:39.81	11	did not advance	
Marcus O'Sullivan	1500 m	3:38.16	6	—		did not advance			
Cormac Finnerty	5000 m	13:54.01	10 Q	—		14:08.88	10	did not advance	
Sean Dollman	10000 m	29:19.03	19	—				did not advance	
Sean Cahill	110 m hurdles	14.28	7	did not advance					
T. J. Kearns	110 m hurdles	13.67	3 Q	13.55	5	did not advance			
Tom McGuirk	400 m hurdles	50.76	5	—		did not advance			
Jimmy McDonald	20 km walk	—						1:32:11	51
Mark Mandy	High jump	2.20	11	—				did not advance	
Nick Sweeney	Discus throw	62.04	13	—				did not advance	
Terry McHugh	Javelin throw	72.84	15	—				did not advance	
Roman Linscheid	Hammer throw	68.14	33	—				did not advance	

Women

Athlete	Events	Heat		Quarterfinal		Semifinal		Final	
Athlete	Events	Result	Rank	Result	Rank	Result	Rank	Result	Rank
Sinead Delahunty	1500 m	4:10.20	5 Q	—		4:12.52	9	did not advance	
Sonia O'Sullivan	1500 m	4:19.77	10	—		did not advance			
Sonia O'Sullivan	5000 m	15:15.80	1 Q	—				DNF	-
Katy McCandless	5000 m	15:55.56	10	—				did not advance	
Marie Davenport	5000 m	15:59.12	14	—				did not advance	
Catherina McKiernan	10000 m	32:32.10	6 Q	—				32:00.38	11
Susan Smith	400 m hurdles	55.22	3 Q	—		54.93	5	did not advance	
Deirdre Gallagher	10 km walk	—						45:47	23

=== Boxing ===
Athlete	Event	Round of 32	Round of 16	Quarterfinals	Semifinals	Final	
Athlete	Event	Opposition Result	Opposition Result	Opposition Result	Opposition Result	Opposition Result	Rank
Damaen Kelly	Flyweight	Strogov (BUL); W 12–11	Hussein (AUS); W 27–20	Jumadilov (KAZ); L 6–13	did not advance		
Francis Barrett	Light welterweight	Ferreria (BRA); W 32–7	Missaoui (TUN); L 6–18	did not advance			
Brian Magee	Middleweight	Thompson (CAN); W 13–5	Tietsia (CMR); W 11–6	Bahari (ALG); L 9–15	did not advance		
Cathal O'Grady	Heavyweight	da Silva (NZL); L RSC 1	did not advance				

=== Canoeing ===
==== Slalom ====
Athlete	Event	Run 1	Rank	Run 2	Rank	Total	Rank
Mike Corcoran	Men's C-1	162.90	8	173.61	13	162.90	10
Stephen O'Flaherty	Men's C-1	188.75	21	220.73	23	188.75	25
Ian Wiley	Men's K-1	145.21	3	207.26	35	145.21	5
Andrew Boland	Men's K-1	201.92	34	184.51	31	184.51	40

==== Flatwater ====
Athlete	Event	Heats		Repechages		Semifinals		Final	
Athlete	Event	Time	Rank	Time	Rank	Time	Rank	Time	Rank
Conor Maloney; Gary Mawer	Men's K-2 500 m	1:43.074	7	1:44.375	7	did not advance			
Conor Maloney; Gary Mawer	Men's K-2 1000 m	4:03.432	6	3:40.656	6	did not advance			

=== Cycling ===
==== Road ====
Men

Athlete	Event	Time	Rank
David McCann	Road race	4:56:49	72

==== Track ====
Pursuits

Athlete	Event	Qualifying		Quarterfinals		Semifinals		Finals	
Athlete	Event	Time	Rank	Opposition Time	Rank	Opposition Time	Rank	Opposition Time	Rank
Phillip Collins	Men's pursuit	4:41.207	16	did not advance					

Points races

Athlete	Event	Points	Rank
Declan Lonergan	Men's points race	0	22

==== Mountain Bike ====
Athlete	Event	Time	Rank
Martin Earley	Men's cross-country	2:43:56	25
Alister Martin	Men's cross-country	2:47:46	32

=== Equestrian ===
==== Eventing ====
Athlete	Horse	Event	Dressage		Cross-country		Show jumping				Total	
Athlete	Horse	Event	Dressage		Cross-country		Qualifier		Final		Total	
Athlete	Horse	Event	Penalties	Rank	Penalties	Rank	Penalties	Rank	Penalties	Rank	Penalties	Rank
David Foster	Tilt 'n' Turn	Individual	54.60	20	DNF	-	-	Eliminated				-

=== Rowing ===
Men's Double Sculls

- Brendan Dolan 3rd in the repechage (→ Unplaced)
- Niall O'Toole 3rd in the repechage (→ Unplaced)

Men's Lightweight Fours

- Derek Holland 4th in the A final (→ 4th)
- Sam Lynch 4th in the A final (→ 4th)
- Neville Maxwell 4th in the A final (→ 4th)
- Tony O'Connor 4th in the A final (→ 4th)

=== Shooting ===
Rifle

Athlete	Event	Qualification		Final	
Athlete	Event	Score	Rank	Score	Rank
Gary Duff	Men's 50 m prone rifle	580	52	did not advance	
Rhona Barry	Women's 10 m air rifle	382	43	did not advance	

=== Swimming ===
Men

Athlete	Events	Heat		Final	
Athlete	Events	Time	Rank	Time	Rank
Nicholas O'Hare	50 m freestyle	24.03	48	did not advance	
Earl McCarthy	100 m freestyle	50.99	27	did not advance	
Earl McCarthy	200 m freestyle	1:53.67	29	did not advance	
Adrian O'Connor	100 m backstroke	58.56	41	did not advance	
Adrian O'Connor	200 m backstroke	2:08.90	35	did not advance	

Women

Athlete	Events	Heat		Final	
Athlete	Events	Time	Rank	Time	Rank
Marion Madine	200 m freestyle	2:04.92	27	did not advance	
Marion Madine	100 m butterfly	1:03.80	31	did not advance	
Michelle Smith	400 m freestyle	4:09.00	2 Q	4:07.25	Gold medal
Michelle Smith	200 m butterfly	2:10.03	2 Q	2:09.91	Bronze medal
Michelle Smith	200 m individual medley	2:16.35	7 Q	2:13.93	Gold medal
Michelle Smith	400 m individual medley	4:43.79	3 Q	4:39.18	Gold medal
