= Marek Witkowski =

Polish sprint canoer (born 1974)

Medal record

Men's canoe sprint
Event	1st	2nd	3rd
Olympic Games	0	0	1
World Championships	0	1	2
European Championships	1	1	1
European Games	0	0	0
Total	1	2	2

Olympic Games
Bronze medal – third place	2000 Sydney	K-4 1000 m

World Championships
Silver medal – second place	1994 Mexico City	K-4 1000 m
Bronze medal – third place	1995 Duisburg	K-4 500 m
Bronze medal – third place	1995 Duisburg	K-4 1000 m

European Championships
Gold medal – first place	1999 Zagreb	K4-1000 m
Bronze medal – third place	1997 Plovdiv	K4-200 m
Bronze medal – third place	1997 Plovdiv	K4-1000 m

Marek Krzysztof Witkowski (born 21 May 1974 in Czechowice-Dziedzice) is a Polish sprint canoeist who competed from 1994 to 2000. Competing in two Summer Olympics, he won a bronze medal in the K-4 1000 m event at Sydney in 2000.

For his sport achievements, he received:
Golden Cross of Merit in 2000.

== Career highlights ==
Witkowski won a bronze medal at the 2000 Summer Olympics in Sydney in the Men's K-4 1000 m competition with crewmates Adam Seroczyński, Dariusz Białkowski and Grzegorz Kotowicz. He also won three medals at the ICF Canoe Sprint World Championships with a silver (K-4 1000 m: 1994) and two bronzes (K-4 500 m and K-4 1000 m: both 1995).
