= Canoeing at the 1999 Pan American Games =

Canoeing at the 1999 Pan American Games took place in Winnipeg, Canada.

== Medal table ==
| Place | Nation | Gold medal | Silver medal | Bronze medal | Total |
|---|---|---|---|---|---|
| 1 | Canada | 4 | 3 | 1 | 8 |
| 2 | Cuba | 3 | 3 | 3 | 9 |
| 3 | Argentina | 3 | 1 | 0 | 4 |
| 4 | United States | 2 | 3 | 4 | 9 |
| 5 | Brazil | 0 | 2 | 3 | 5 |
| 6 | Mexico | 0 | 0 | 1 | 1 |
| Total | | 12 | 12 | 12 | 36 |

== Men's events ==
| Event | Gold | Silver | Bronze |
|---|---|---|---|
| C-1 500 metres | Ledys Balceiro; Cuba | Stephen Giles; Canada | Jim Terrell; United States |
| C-2 500 metres | Cuba; Leobaldo Pereira; Ibrahim Rojas | Canada; Maxim Boilard; Howard Pellerin | United States; Jordan Malloch; Nate Johnson |
| C-1 1000 metres | Stephen Giles; Canada | Ledys Balceiro; Cuba | José Romero; Mexico |
| C-2 1000 metres | Cuba; Leobaldo Pereira; Ibrahim Rojas | Canada; Attila Buday; Tamas Buday Jr. | United States; Jordan Malloch; Nate Johnson |
| K-1 500 metres | Javier Correa; Argentina | Peter Newton; United States | Carlos Augusto Campos; Brazil |
| K-2 500 metres | United States; Stein Jorgensen; John Mooney | Argentina; Javier Correa; Abelardo Sztrum | Brazil; Sebastián Cuattrin; Carlos Augusto Campos |
| K-1 1000 metres | Javier Correa; Argentina | Sebastián Cuattrin; Brazil | Adrian Richardson; Canada |
| K-2 1000 metres | Argentina; Abelardo Sztrum; Javier Correa | Brazil; Sebastián Cuattrin; Carlos Augusto Campos | Cuba; Marcelino Cipriano; Luís Fernández |
| K-4 1000 metres | United States; Stein Jorgensen; John Mooney; Peter Newton; Justian Piasecki | Cuba; Marcelino Cipriano; Luís Fernández; Yoel Mendoza; Rene Pedroso | Brazil; Sebastián Cuattrin; Carlos Augusto Campos; André Lúcio Kaye; Roger Caumo |

=== Women's events ===
| Event | Gold | Silver | Bronze |
|---|---|---|---|
| K-1 500 metres | Karen Furneaux; Canada | Kathryn Colin; United States | Mariela Suárez; Cuba |
| K-2 500 metres | Canada; Marie-Josée Gilbeau-Ouimet; Carrie Lightbound | United States; Kathryn Colin; Tamara Jenkins | Cuba; Daylén Hernández; Mirlenis Aguilera |
| K-4 500 metres | Canada; Marie-Josée Gilbeau-Ouimet; Karen Furneaux; Carrie Lightbound; Liza Racine | Cuba; Daylén Hernández; Mirlenis Aguilera; Yamilé Ley; Mariela Suárez | United States; Kathryn Colin; Tamara Jenkins; Alexandra Harbold; Julia Sorzano |
