= Polívka =

Polívka (feminine Polívková) is a Czech surname, it may refer to:

- Anne Polivka, American economic statistician
- Bolek Polívka, Czech entertainer
- Jaroslav Josef Polívka, Czech structural engineer
- Jiří Polívka (canoeist), Czech canoer
- Jiří Polívka (linguist), Czech linguist
- Ondřej Polívka, Czech modern pentathlete
- Osvald Polívka, Czech architect
