= Ledis Balceiro =

Cuban sprint canoeist (born 1975)

Personal information
- Full name: Ledis Frank Balceiro Pajon
- Born: 18 April 1975 (age 51) Matanzas, Cuba
Medal record
Men's canoe sprint
Representing Cuba
Olympic Games
| Silver medal – second place | 2000 Sydney | C-1 1000 m |
| Silver medal – second place | 2004 Athens | C-2 500 m |
World Championships
| Gold medal – first place | 2002 Seville | C-2 200 m |
| Gold medal – first place | 2002 Seville | C-2 500 m |
| Silver medal – second place | 2002 Seville | C-2 1000 m |
| Bronze medal – third place | 2003 Gainesville | C-2 500 m |
Pan American Games
| Gold medal – first place | 1995 Mar del Plata | C-1 1000 m |
| Gold medal – first place | 1999 Winnipeg | C-1 500 m |
| Gold medal – first place | 2003 Santo Domingo | C-2 500 m |
| Gold medal – first place | 2003 Santo Domingo | C-2 1000 m |
| Silver medal – second place | 1999 Winnipeg | C-1 1000 m |

Ledis Frank Balceiro Pajon (born 18 April 1975) is a Cuban sprint canoeist who competed from the mid-1990s to the mid-2000s.

In 1995 Balceiro became the first-ever Cuban canoeist to win a major international title, taking the Pan-American Games C-1 1000 m gold medal in Mar del Plata, Argentina.

At the 1999 Pan American Games in Winnipeg, Balceiro duelled with Canadian Steve Giles, the reigning world C-1 1000 m champion. Giles won the C-1 1000 m final ahead of Balceiro with the positions reversed in the C-1 500 m event.

By now the Cubans were challenging the top European canoeists as well and at the Sydney Olympics, Balceiro achieved another first as he won the country's first-ever canoe/kayak Olympic medal - the C-1 1000 m silver behind Germany's Andreas Dittmer. In the C-1 500 m event, he finished sixth.

On the retirement of Leobaldo Pereira at the end of the 2001 season, Balceiro was selected as the new partner for Ibrahim Rojas in Cuba's two-man (C-2) canoe. The two men had occasionally raced together as teenagers and struck up an immediate understanding on and off the water. In 2002 they became double world champions (C-2 200 m and C-2 500 m) in Seville, Spain. They also took the silver medal in the C-2 1000 m final. The pair were voted Cuban Athletes of the Year in recognition of their achievement.

In 2003 they won both C-2 finals at the Pan American Games (500 m and 1000 m) and went to the World Championships at Gainesville, USA, as favourites. Unlike their main European rivals, they again entered all three C-2 events. They finished fourth in the C-2 500 m, but were awarded bronze after the Russian team was stripped of their silver medals following Sergey Ulegin's doping disqualification. The Cuban pair had had very little recovery time since the Pan-American Games however and, this time, their grueling race schedule took its toll on Rojas and they finished outside the medals.

Both men were due to retire after the Athens Olympics and were hopeful of bowing out with a medal. Eighth place in the C-2 1000 m final was a disappointment, but the next day they won the C-2 500m silver medal.

Balceiro later decided to continue and switched back to the C-1 event for the 2005 season.

He holds the C-1 200 m world record of 38.383 seconds (Seville 2002)
