= Ivanik =

Ivanik or Iwanyk (Cyrillic: Иваник) is a gender-neutral Ukrainian surname. Notable people with the surname include:

- Aleksandr Ivanik (born 1968), Russian sprint canoer
- Basil Iwanyk (born 1970), American film producer of Ukrainian origin
