= Jiří Polívka =

Jiří Polívka may refer to:

- Jiří Polívka (canoeist)
- Jiří Polívka (linguist)
