= Ibrahim Rojas =

Cuban canoeist (born 1975)

Personal information
- Born: October 10, 1975 (age 50) Santa Cruz del Sur, Camagüey, Cuba

Sport
- Sport: Canoeing
Medal record
Representing Cuba
Olympic Games
Silver medal – second place	2000 Sydney	C-2 1000 m
Silver medal – second place	2004 Athens	C-2 500 m
World Championships
Gold medal – first place	2001 Poznań	C-2 500 m
Gold medal – first place	2002 Seville	C-2 200 m
Gold medal – first place	2002 Seville	C-2 500 m
Silver medal – second place	1999 Milan	C-2 1000 m
Silver medal – second place	2002 Seville	C-2 1000 m
Bronze medal – third place	2001 Poznań	C-2 200 m
Bronze medal – third place	2001 Poznań	C-2 1000 m
Bronze medal – third place	2003 Gainesville	C-2 500 m
Pan American Games
Gold medal – first place	1995 Mar del Plata	C-2 1000 m
Gold medal – first place	1999 Winnipeg	C-2 500 m
Gold medal – first place	1999 Winnipeg	C-2 1000 m
Gold medal – first place	2003 Santo Domingo	C-2 500 m
Gold medal – first place	2003 Santo Domingo	C-2 1000 m

Ibrahim Rojas Blanco (born October 10, 1975) is a Cuban sprint canoeist who competed from the late 1990s to the mid-2000s.

In 2001 he and partner Leobaldo Pereira won Cuba's first-ever world championship gold medal. In all Rojas won three world titles and was Pan American champion four times. He also won silver medals at both the Sydney and Athens Olympics.

All his medals came in the two-man (C-2) Canadian canoe discipline, first with Pereira and later with Ledis Balceiro. Rojas would win eight world championship medals in his career.
