= Grzegorz Kotowicz =

Polish canoeist (born 1973)

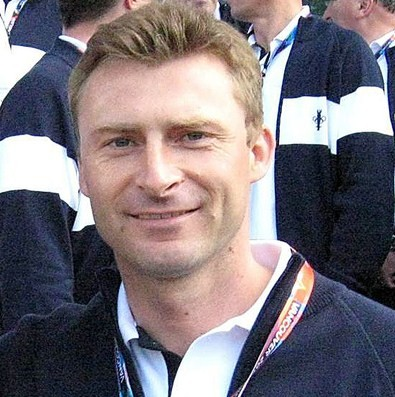

Medal record

Men's canoe sprint
Event	1st	2nd	3rd
Olympic Games	0	0	2
World Championships	0	3	5
European Championships	1	4	1
European Games	0	0	0
Total	1	2	2

Olympic Games
Bronze medal – third place	1992 Barcelona	K-2 1000 m
Bronze medal – third place	2000 Sydney	K-4 1000 m

World Championships
Silver medal – second place	1994 Mexico City	K-4 1000 m
Silver medal – second place	1997 Dartmouth	K-1 200 m
Silver medal – second place	1997 Dartmouth	K-1 500 m
Bronze medal – third place	1995 Duisburg	K-2 1000 m
Bronze medal – third place	1995 Duisburg	K-4 500 m
Bronze medal – third place	1995 Duisburg	K-4 1000 m
Bronze medal – third place	1997 Dartmouth	K-2 1000 m
Bronze medal – third place	1999 Milan	K-1 500 m

European Championships
Gold medal – first place	1999 Zagreb	K4-1000 m
Silver medal – second place	1997 Plovdiv	K1-200 m
Silver medal – second place	1997 Plovdiv	K1-500 m
Silver medal – second place	1997 Plovdiv	K2-1000 m
Silver medal – second place	1999 Zagreb	K1-500 m
Bronze medal – third place	1997 Plovdiv	K2-1000 m

Grzegorz Leon Kotowicz (born 6 August 1973 in Czechowice-Dziedzice) is a Polish sprint canoer who competed from the early 1990s to the early 2000s (decade). In his career, Kotowicz garnered two Olympic medals, eight World Championship medals, and five European Championship medals.

For his sport achievements, he received:
Golden Cross of Merit in 2000.

== Summer Olympics ==
Competing in three Summer Olympics, he won two bronze medals. Kotowicz won them in the K-2 1000 m in 1992 and in the K-4 1000 m in 2000.

== World championships ==
Kotowicz won eight medals at the ICF Canoe Sprint World Championships with three silvers (K-1 200 m: 1997, K-1 500 m: 1997, K-4 1000 m: 1994) and five bronzes (K-1 500 m: 1999, K-2 1000 m: 1995, 1997; K-4 500 m: 1995, K-4 1000 m: 1995).

== European Championships ==
Kotowicz won three silver medals at the 1997 European Championship (K-1 200 m, K-1 500 m, K-2 1000 m). At the 1999 edition, he won gold in the K-4 1000 m event with teammates Białkowski, Seroczyński and Witkowski. Kotowicz also won silver in the K-1 500 m event at those same championships.

== Post-Competition Career ==
On 8 January 2005 Grzegorz Kotowicz was appointed to the International Canoe Federation (ICF) Athletes Commission.^{[1]}
