= Diego Cánepa =

Diego Cánepa may refer to:

- Diego Cánepa (politician) (born 1972), Uruguayan lawyer and politician
- Diego Cánepa (canoeist) (born 1976), Belgian sprint canoeist
