= David Taboureau =

Belgian sprint canoer (born 1968)

David Taboureau (Ghent, 26 April 1968) is a Belgian canoe sprinter who has competed in the mid-1990s. At the 1996 Summer Olympics in Atlanta, he was eliminated in the semifinals of the K-2 500 m event and the repechages of the K-2 1000 m event with his teammate Mark Vandeweyer.

2 years earlier in 1994 David and Mark qualified for the A-final of the 1994 ICF Canoe Sprint World Championships in Mexico City, in which they took a 9th place.

At the 1999 ICF Canoe Sprint World Championships, David Taboureau paddled in the Belgian K4 with teammates Bob Maesen, David Stevens and Luuk Van Veldhoven, trying to qualify for the 2000 Summer Olympics in Sydney. They were eliminated in the semi-finals which made him put a point behind his career. David is a member of Koninklijke Cano Club Gent.
