= Alexandra Harbold =

American canoeist

Personal information
- Born: March 4, 1965 (age 61) New York City, New York, United States

Sport
- Sport: Canoeing
Medal record
Representing United States
Pan American Games
| Gold medal – first place | 1995 Mar del Plata | K-1 500m |
| Silver medal – second place | 1995 Mar del Plata | K-4 500m |
| Bronze medal – third place | 1999 Winnipeg | K-4 500m |

Alexandra Harbold (née Bernhart; born March 4, 1965) is an American sprint kayaker who competed in the early to mid-1990s. Competing in two Summer Olympics, she earned her best finish of seventh in the K-4 500 m event at Barcelona in 1992.
