= Fernando Redondo (canoeist) =

Argentine canoeist

Personal information
- Born: March 16, 1978 (age 48)

Sport
- Sport: Canoeing
Medal record
Representing Argentina
Pan American Games
Silver medal – second place	2003 Santo Domingo	K-2 500m
Bronze medal – third place	2003 Santo Domingo	K-4 1000m

Fernando Martín Redondo (born March 16, 1978) is an Argentine sprint canoer who competed in the early 2000s. At the 2000 Summer Olympics in Sydney, he was eliminated in the heats of the K-2 1000 m event.
