= Grant Leury =

Australian sprint canoeist (born 1967)

Grant Leury (born 5 November 1967) is an Australian sprint canoeist who competed in the mid-1990s. He finished seventh in the K-2 1000 m event at the 1996 Summer Olympics in Atlanta.
