= Carlos Campos (canoeist) =

Brazilian canoeist (born 1978)

Personal information
- Born: July 5, 1978 (age 48) São Paulo, Brazil

Sport
- Sport: Canoeing
Medal record
Representing Brazil
Pan American Games
Gold medal – first place	2003 Santo Domingo	K-2 500m
Gold medal – first place	2007 Rio de Janeiro	K-4 1000m
Silver medal – second place	2003 Santo Domingo	K-4 1000m
Silver medal – second place	1999 Winnipeg	K-2 1000m
Bronze medal – third place	1999 Winnipeg	K-1 500m
Bronze medal – third place	1999 Winnipeg	K-2 500m
Bronze medal – third place	1999 Winnipeg	K-4 1000m

Carlos Augusto Pimenta de Campos (sometimes listed as Guto, born July 5, 1978) is a Brazilian sprint canoeist who competed in the early 2000s. At the 2000 Summer Olympics in Sydney, he was eliminated in the semifinals of both the K-2 500 m and the K-2 1000 m events.
