= Frédéric Gauthier =

French canoeist

Frédéric Gauthier (born 27 September 1975 in Vernon, Eure) is a French sprint canoer who competed in the early 2000s. At the 2000 Summer Olympics in Sydney, he was eliminated in the semifinals of the K-4 1000 m event.
