= Daniel Collins (canoeist) =

Australian sprint canoeist

Medal record

Men's canoe sprint

Representing Australia

Olympic Games
Silver medal – second place	2000 Sydney	K-2 500 m
Bronze medal – third place	1996 Atlanta	K-2 500 m

World Championships
Gold medal – first place	1997 Dartmouth	K-2 500 m
Silver medal – second place	1994 Mexico City	K-1 500 m
Bronze medal – third place	1993 Copenhagen	K-1 500 m
Bronze medal – third place	1999 Milan	K-2 500 m

Daniel James "Danny" Collins (born 7 October 1970) is an Australian sprint canoeist who competed from the early 1990s to the mid-2000s (decade). Competing in four Summer Olympics, he won two medals in the K-2 500 m event with a silver in 2000 and a bronze in 1996, with canoeing partner Andrew Trim.

== Career ==
Collins also won four medals at the ICF Canoe Sprint World Championships with a gold (K-2 500 m: 1997), a silver (K-1 500 m: 1994), and two bronzes (K-1 500 m: 1993, K-2 500 m: 1999).

== Personal life ==
Collins' son, Jackson, is also an Olympic canoeist.
