= Jozef Soti =

Jozef Soti (born 15 February 1972 Switzerland, Uster) is a Serbian former sprint canoer who competed for FR Yugoslavia in the early 2000s. At the 2000 Summer Olympics in Sydney, he finished ninth in the K-4 1000 m event.

He is currently coach of Serbian olympian Marko Novaković.
