= Juan Martínez (canoeist, born 1973) =

Mexican canoeist

Personal information
- Born: 7 May 1973 (age 53)

Sport
- Sport: Canoeing
Medal record
Representing Mexico
Men's canoe sprint
World Championships
Bronze medal – third place	1994 Mexico City	C-4 1000 m
Pan American Games
Silver medal – second place	1991 Havana	C-2 500m
Silver medal – second place	1995 Mar del Plata	C-1 1000m
Bronze medal – third place	1995 Mar del Plata	C-1 500m
Bronze medal – third place	1995 Mar del Plata	C-2 1000m
Central American and Caribbean Games
Gold medal – first place	1993 Ponce	C-2 1000m
Silver medal – second place	1993 Ponce	C-2 200m
Silver medal – second place	1993 Ponce	C-2 500m

Juan Martínez Santana (born 7 May 1973) is a Mexican sprint canoer who competed in the mid-1990s. He won a bronze medal in the C-4 1000 m event at the 1994 ICF Canoe Sprint World Championships in Mexico City.
