= Jan Schäfer =

German Olympic canoer

Medal record

Men's canoe sprint

Representing Germany

Olympic Games
Silver medal – second place	2000 Sydney	K-4 1000 m

World Championships
Bronze medal – third place	1999 Milan	K-2 1000 m

Jan Schäfer (born 18 October 1974 in Dresden) is a German sprint canoer who competed from the late 1990s to the mid-2000s. Competing in two Summer Olympics, he won a silver medal in the K-4 1000 m event at Sydney in 2000.

Schäfer also won a bronze medal in the K-2 1000 m event at the 1999 ICF Canoe Sprint World Championships in Milan.
