= Babak Amir-Tahmasseb =

Iranian-born French sprint kayaker

Medal record

Representing France

Men's canoe sprint

World Championships
Gold medal – first place	2001 Poznań	K-1 1000 m

Bâbak Amir-Tahmasseb (Persian: بابک امیرطهماسب; born 19 May 1976) is an Iranian-born French sprint kayaker who competed in the early to mid-2000s. He won a gold medal in the K-1 1000 m event at the 2001 ICF Canoe Sprint World Championships in Poznań.

Amir-Tahmasseb also competed in two Summer Olympics, earning his best finish of fourth in the K-2 500 m event at Sydney in 2000.

He is a member of the Strasbourg Eaux-Vives club.

== Bibliography ==
- Official website
- Evans, Hilary; Gjerde, Arild; Heijmans, Jeroen; Mallon, Bill; et al. "Babak Amir-Tahmasseb". Olympics at Sports-Reference.com. Sports Reference LLC. Archived from the original on 2020-04-17.
- Exhaustive result list on Strasbourg Eaux-Vives website
- Strasbourg.fr profile
