= Canoeing at the 2003 Pan American Games =

This page shows the results of the Canoeing Competition for men and women at the 2003 Pan American Games, held from August 1 to August 17, 2003, in Centro de Remo y Canotaje Presa de Rincón, Sabana del Puerto, Monseñor Nouel, Dominican Republic.

== Men's competition ==
=== K1 500 m ===
RANK	NAME
Gold medal	Javier Correa (ARG)
Silver medal	Sebastian Cuattrin (BRA)
Bronze medal	Mark de Jonge (CAN)

=== K2 500 m ===
RANK	NAME
Gold medal	Brazil; Carlos Campos; Fábio Demarchi
Silver medal	Argentina; Miguel Correa; Fernando Redondo
Bronze medal	Mexico; Manuel Cortina Martínez; Ricardo Reza

=== K1 1,000 m ===
RANK	NAME
Gold medal	Javier Correa (ARG)
Silver medal	Sebastian Cuattrin (BRA)
Bronze medal	Rami Zur (USA)

=== K2 1,000 m ===
RANK	NAME
Gold medal	Cuba; Lancy Martínez; Yoel Mendoza
Silver medal	United States; Benjie Lewis; Brandon Woods
Bronze medal	Brazil; Roger Caumo; Fábio Demarchi

=== K4 1,000 m ===
RANK	NAME
Gold medal	Cuba; Oslay Calzadilla; Andi Sicilia; Lancy Martínez; Yoel Mendoza
Silver medal	Brazil; Sebastian Szubski; Carlos Campos; André Caye; Sebastian Cuattrin
Bronze medal	Argentina; Damian Dossena; Rodrigo Caffa; Fernando Redondo; Miguel Correa

=== C1 500 m ===
RANK	NAME
Gold medal	Karel Aguilar (CUB)
Silver medal	Scott Dickey (CAN)
Bronze medal	Francisco Caputitla (MEX)

=== C2 500 m ===
RANK	NAME
Gold medal	Cuba; Ledis Balceiro; Ibrahim Rojas
Silver medal	Mexico; Cristian Dehesa; José Romero
Bronze medal	Canada; Ian Mortimer; Tom Hall

=== C1 1,000 m ===
RANK	NAME
Gold medal	Tom Hall (CAN)
Silver medal	José Romero (MEX)
Bronze medal	Darwin Correa (URU)

=== C2 1,000 m ===
RANK	NAME
Gold medal	Cuba; Ledis Balceiro; Ibrahim Rojas
Silver medal	Chile; Fabian López; Johnnathan Tafra
Bronze medal	Mexico; Cristian Dehesa; José Romero

== Women's competition ==
=== K1 500 m ===
RANK	NAME
Gold medal	Ruth Nortje (USA)
Silver medal	Fernanda Lauro (ARG)
Bronze medal	Jillian D'Alessio (CAN)

=== K2 500 m ===
RANK	NAME
Gold medal	United States; Ruth Nortje; Kathryn Colin
Silver medal	Canada; Émilie Fournel; Victoria Tuttle
Bronze medal	Argentina; Sabrina Ameghino; María Romano

=== K4 500 m ===
RANK	NAME
Gold medal	Canada; Jennifer Adamson; Jillian D'Alessio; Émilie Fournel; Victoria Tuttle
Silver medal	United States; Kathryn Colin; Sonrisa Reed; Ruth Nortje; Kari-Jean McKenzie
Bronze medal	Argentina; Mari Ducrett; Vanesia Pittao; Sabrina Ameghino; María Romano

== Medal table ==
Place	Nation	Gold medal	Silver medal	Bronze medal	Total
1	Cuba	5	0	0	5
2	Argentina	2	2	3	7
2	Canada	2	2	3	7
4	United States	2	2	1	5
5	Brazil	1	3	1	5
6	Mexico	0	2	3	5
7	Chile	0	1	0	1
8	Uruguay	0	0	1	1
Total		12	12	12	36

== See also ==
- Canoeing at the 2004 Summer Olympics
