= Akram Yurabayev =

Uzbekistani canoeist (born 1973)

Akram Yurabayev (born 21 April 1973) is an Uzbekistani sprint canoeist who competed in the mid-1990s. At the 1996 Summer Olympics in Atlanta, he was eliminated in the semifinals of the K-2 500 m event.
