= Ross Sabberton =

British sprint canoer (born 1978)

Ross Sabberton (born 4 October 1978) is a British canoe sprinter who competed in the early 2000s. At the 2000 Summer Olympics in Sydney, he was eliminated in the semifinals of both the K-2 500 m and the K-2 1000 m events.
