= Vaidas Mizeras =

Lithuanian canoeist (born 1973)

Vaidas Mizeras (born August 9, 1973) is a Lithuanian sprint canoer who competed from the mid-1990s to the early 2000s (decade). At the 1996 Summer Olympics in Atlanta, he was eliminated in the semifinals of both the K-2 500 m and the K-2 1000 m events. Four years later in Sydney, Mizeras was eliminated in the semifinals of the K-1 1000 m event.
