= Andrew Trim =

Australian flatwater canoeist (born 1968)

Medal record

Men's canoe sprint

Olympic Games
Silver medal – second place	2000 Sydney	K-2 500 m
Bronze medal – third place	1996 Atlanta	K-2 500 m

World Championships
Gold medal – first place	1997 Dartmouth	K-2 500 m
Bronze medal – third place	1999 Milan	K-2 500 m

Andrew Trim (born 30 December 1968 in Sydney, New South Wales) is an Australian flatwater canoeist who competed from the early 1990s to the early 2000s (decade). Competing in three Summer Olympics, he won two medals in the K-2 500 m event with a silver in 2000 and a bronze in 1996, with canoeing partner Daniel Collins.

Trim and Collins also won two medals in the K-2 500 m event at the ICF Canoe Sprint World Championships with a gold in 1997 and a bronze in 1999. He was an Australian Institute of Sport scholarship for the periods 1989–1990, 1992 and 1995–1996.

He entered into real estate, serving as principal of Johnson Real Estate in Birkdale. Trim later became a member of the Liberal National Party and candidate in the 2006 Queensland State Election for the state seat of Cleveland. Trim lost to the new Labor Party candidate, Phil Weightman.
