= Rui Fernandes =

Portuguese canoeist

Rui Fernandes (born 16 March 1971) is a Portuguese sprint canoer who competed in the early to mid-1990s. He was eliminated in the semifinals of the K-4 1000 m event at the 1992 Summer Olympics in Barcelona. Four years later in Atlanta, Fernandes was eliminated in the semifinals of both the K-2 500 m and the K-2 1000 m events.
