= Stéphane Gourichon =

French canoeist (born 1977)

Stéphane Gourichon (born August 5, 1977 in Angers) is a French sprint canoer who competed in the early 2000s. At the 2000 Summer Olympics in Sydney, he was eliminated in the semifinals of the K-4 1000 m event.
