= Kay Bluhm =

East German canoe racer

Medal record

Men's canoe sprint

Olympic Games
Gold medal – first place	1992 Barcelona	K-2 500 m
Gold medal – first place	1992 Barcelona	K-2 1000 m
Gold medal – first place	1996 Atlanta	K-2 500 m
Silver medal – second place	1996 Atlanta	K-2 1000 m
Bronze medal – third place	1988 Seoul	K-4 1000 m

World Championships
Gold medal – first place	1989 Plovdiv	K-2 500 m
Gold medal – first place	1989 Plovdiv	K-2 1000 m
Gold medal – first place	1990 Poznań	K-2 1000 m
Gold medal – first place	1991 Paris	K-2 1000 m
Gold medal – first place	1993 Copenhagen	K-2 500 m
Gold medal – first place	1993 Copenhagen	K-2 1000 m
Gold medal – first place	1994 Mexico City	K-2 500 m
Silver medal – second place	1989 Plovdiv	K-1 500 m
Silver medal – second place	1991 Paris	K-2 500 m
Silver medal – second place	1991 Paris	K-2 10000 m
Silver medal – second place	1995 Duisburg	K-2 1000 m
Bronze medal – third place	1990 Poznań	K-2 500 m
Bronze medal – third place	1990 Poznań	K-4 1000 m
Bronze medal – third place	1994 Mexico City	K-2 200 m

Kay Bluhm (born 13 October 1968 in Brandenburg) is an East German-German canoe sprinter who competed from the late 1980s to the late 1990s. Competing in three Summer Olympics, he won three golds (K-2 500 m: 1992, 1996; K-2 1000 m: 1992), one silver (K-2 1000 m: 1996), and one bronze (K-4 1000 m: 1988).

Bluhm also won fourteen medals at the ICF Canoe Sprint World Championships with seven golds (K-2 500 m: 1989, 1993, 1994; K-2 1000 m: 1989, 1990, 1991, 1993), four silvers (K-1 500 m: 1989, K-2 500 m: 1991, K-2 1000 m: 1995, K-2 10000 m: 1991), and three bronzes (K-2 200 m: 1994, K-2 500 m: 1990, K-4 1000 m: 1990).
