= Abelardo Sztrum =

Argentine canoeist

Personal information
- Born: February 6, 1974 (age 52) Buenos Aires, Argentina

Sport
- Sport: Canoeing
Medal record
Representing Argentina
Pan American Games
Gold medal – first place	1995 Mar del Plata	K-1 1000m
Gold medal – first place	1995 Mar del Plata	K-2 1000m
Gold medal – first place	1999 Winnipeg	K-2 1000m
Silver medal – second place	1999 Winnipeg	K-2 500m
Bronze medal – third place	1995 Mar del Plata	K-4 500m

Abelardo Andrés Sztrum (born February 6, 1974) is an Argentine sprint canoer who competed from the mid-1990s to the early 2000s (decade). At the 1996 Summer Olympics in Atlanta, he was in semifinals of both the K-1 1000 m and the K-2 1000 m events. Four years later in Sydney, Sztrum was in the K-2 1000 m event.

Sztrum was the first Argentina's gold medalist in Pan American Games (1995), the first World Cup medalist (1997) the first senior finalist in World Championships (1997).
