= Torsten Gutsche =

German sprint canoer (born 1968)

Medal record

Men's canoe sprint

Olympic Games
Gold medal – first place	1992 Barcelona	K-2 500 m
Gold medal – first place	1992 Barcelona	K-2 1000 m
Gold medal – first place	1996 Atlanta	K-2 500 m
Silver medal – second place	1996 Atlanta	K-2 1000 m

World Championships
Gold medal – first place	1989 Plovdiv	K-2 500 m
Gold medal – first place	1989 Plovdiv	K-2 1000 m
Gold medal – first place	1990 Poznań	K-2 1000 m
Gold medal – first place	1991 Paris	K-2 1000 m
Gold medal – first place	1993 Copenhagen	K-2 500 m
Gold medal – first place	1993 Copenhagen	K-2 1000 m
Gold medal – first place	1994 Mexico City	K-2 500 m
Gold medal – first place	1997 Dartmouth	K-4 1000 m
Gold medal – first place	1998 Szeged	K-4 500 m
Gold medal – first place	1998 Szeged	K-4 1000 m
Gold medal – first place	1999 Milan	K-4 500 m
Silver medal – second place	1991 Paris	K-2 500 m
Silver medal – second place	1991 Paris	K-2 10000 m
Silver medal – second place	1995 Duisburg	K-2 1000 m
Silver medal – second place	1997 Dartmouth	K-4 500 m
Silver medal – second place	1999 Milan	K-4 1000 m
Bronze medal – third place	1990 Poznań	K-2 500 m
Bronze medal – third place	1990 Poznań	K-4 1000 m
Bronze medal – third place	1994 Mexico City	K-2 200 m
Bronze medal – third place	1997 Dartmouth	K-4 200 m

Torsten René Gutsche (born 8 June 1968, in Eisenhüttenstadt) is an East German-German sprint canoer who competed from the late 1980s to the late 1990s. Competing in two Summer Olympics, he won three golds (K-2 500 m: 1992, 1996; K-2 1000 m: 1992) and one silver (K-2 1000 m: 1996).

Gutsche also won twenty medals at the ICF Canoe Sprint World Championships with eleven golds (K-2 500 m: 1989, 1993, 1994; K-2 1000 m: 1989, 1990, 1991, 1993; K-4 500 m: 1998, 1999; K-4 1000 m: 1997, 1998), five silvers (K-2 500 m: 1991, K-2 1000 m: 1995, K-2 10000 m: 1991, K-4 500 m: 1997, K-4 1000 m: 1999), and four bronzes (K-2 200 m: 1994, K-2 500 m: 1990, K-4 200 m: 1997, K-4 1000 m: 1990).
