= Roman Zarubin =

Russian sprint canoer

Medal record

Men's canoe sprint

Representing Russia

World Championships
Gold medal – first place	2001 Poznań	K-4 500 m
Silver medal – second place	1999 Milan	K-2 200 m
Silver medal – second place	1999 Milan	K-4 500 m
Silver medal – second place	2001 Poznań	K-4 200 m
Bronze medal – third place	1998 Szeged	K-4 500 m
Bronze medal – third place	2001 Poznań	K-4 1000 m
Bronze medal – third place	2009 Dartmouth	K-4 200 m

Roman Zarubin (Russian: Роман Зарубин; born 4 December 1976 in Belaya Kalitva, Rostov) is a Russian sprint canoeist who has competed since the late 1990s. He won seven medals at the ICF Canoe Sprint World Championships with a gold (K-4 500 m: 2001), three silvers (K-2 200 m: 1999, K-4 200 m: 2001, K-4 500 m: 2001), and three bronzes (K-4 200 m: 2009, K-4 500 m: 1998, K-4 1000 m: 2001).

Zarubin also competed in two events at the 2000 Summer Olympics in Sydney, finishing seventh in the K-4 1000 m event while being eliminated in the semifinals of the K-2 500 m event.
