= Erik Lindeberg =

Swedish canoeist (born 1979)

Erik Lindeberg (born 29 June 1979 in Nyköping) is a Swedish sprint canoer who competed in the early 2000s. At the 2000 Summer Olympics in Sydney, he finished eighth in the K-4 1000 m event.
