= Roger Caumo =

Brazilian canoeist (born 1979)

Personal information
- Born: April 20, 1979 (age 47) Bento Gonçalves, Rio Grande do Sul, Brazil

Sport
- Sport: Canoeing
Medal record
Representing Brazil
Pan American Games
Bronze medal – third place	1999 Winnipeg	K4 1000m
Bronze medal – third place	2003 Santo Domingo	K2 1000m

Roger Caumo (born April 20, 1979) is a Brazilian sprint canoer who competed in the early 2000s. He was eliminated in the heats of both the K-1 500 m and the K-1 1000 m events at the 2000 Summer Olympics in Sydney.
