= Sergio Mangín =

Argentine canoeist (born 1973)

Personal information
- Born: June 28, 1973 (age 53) Neuquén, Argentina

Sport
- Sport: Canoeing
Medal record
Representing Argentina
Pan American Games
Bronze medal – third place	1995 Mar del Plata	K-1 500m
Bronze medal – third place	1995 Mar del Plata	K-2 500m
Bronze medal – third place	1995 Mar del Plata	K-4 1000m

Sergio Alejandro Mangín (born June 28, 1973) is an Argentine sprint canoer who has competed in the mid-1990s. At the 1996 Summer Olympics in Atlanta, he was eliminated in the semifinals of the K-2 500 m event.
