= Maxime Boccon =

French sprint canoer (born 1974)

Maxime Boccon (born 17 June 1974 in Vesoul) is a French sprint canoer who competed in the early 2000s. At the 2000 Summer Olympics in Sydney, he was eliminated in the semifinals of the K-4 1000 m event.
