= Philippe Aubertin =

French sprint canoer (born 1969)

Personal information
- Nationality: French
- Born: April 23, 1969 (age 57) Nancy, France

Sport
- Sport: Sprint canoeing
- Event: K-2 500 m

Achievements and titles
- Olympic finals: 1996 Summer Olympics; 2000 Summer Olympics

Philippe Aubertin (born 23 April 1969 in Nancy) is a French sprint canoeist who competed from the early 1990s to the early 2000s. Competing in two Summer Olympics, he earned his best finish of fourth in the K-2 500 m event at Sydney in 2000.

== Bibliography ==
- Sports-Reference.com profile
