= Igor Kovačić =

Serbian canoeist

Medal record

Men's canoe sprint

European U23 Canoe Sprint Championships
Silver medal – second place	2002 Zagreb	K-2 1000 m

Igor Kovačić (born 27 October 1979) is a Serbian sprint canoer who competed in international events in the early 2000s. At the 2000 Summer Olympics in Sydney, he finished ninth in the K-4 1000 m event.
