= Pavel Holubář =

Czech canoeist (born 1970)

Pavel Holubář (born 7 June 1970 in Brno) is a Czech sprint canoeist who competed in the early 2000s.

At the 2000 Summer Olympics in Sydney, he was eliminated in the semifinals of both the K-2 500 m and the K-4 1000 m events.
