= Ralph Heinze =

Mexican canoeist (born 1975)

Personal information
- Born: March 26, 1975 (age 51)

Sport
- Country: Mexico
- Sport: Sprint canoeing

Achievements and titles
- Olympic finals: 1966

Ralph Heinze Flamand (born March 26, 1975) is a Mexican sprint canoer who competed in the mid-1990s. At the 1996 Summer Olympics in Atlanta, he was eliminated in the repechages of the K-2 500 m event.
