= Patrick Lancereau =

French sprint canoeist (born 1966)

Patrick Lancereau (born 18 July 1966 in Tours) is a French sprint canoeist who competed in the early to mid-1990s. Competing in two Summer Olympics, he earned his best finish of fifth in the K-2 1000 m event at Atlanta in 1996.
