= Ross Chaffer =

Australian sprint canoeist

Medal record

Men's canoe sprint

World Championships
| Bronze medal – third place | 1997 Dartmouth | K-4 1000 m |

Ross Chaffer (born 18 July 1972) is an Australian sprint canoeist who competed in the late 1990s and early 2000s. He won a bronze medal in the K-4 1000 m event at the 1997 ICF Canoe Sprint World Championships in Dartmouth.

Chaffer also competed in the K-4 1000 m event at the 2000 Summer Olympics in Sydney, but was eliminated in the semifinals.
