= Staffan Malmsten =

Swedish canoeist

Benny Staffan Malmsten (born October 22, 1970, in Katrineholm) is a Swedish sprint canoer who competed in the mid-1990s. At the 1996 Summer Olympics in Atlanta, he finished eighth in the K-2 1000 m event while being eliminated in the semifinals of the K-2 500 m event.
