= Joaquim Queiróz =

Portuguese sprint canoer (born 1971)

Joaquim Queiróz (born 6 April 1971) is a Portuguese sprint canoeist who competed in the early to mid-1990s. At the 1992 Summer Olympics in Barcelona, he was eliminated in the semifinals of both the K-2 500 m and the K-2 1000 m events. Four years later in Atlanta, Queiróz was eliminated in the semifinals of both the K-2 500 m and the K-2 1000 m events.
