= Argentine Brazilians =

Ethnic group in Brazil

Argentine Brazilians Argentino-brasileiro · Argentino-brasileño
- (Argentina) (Brazil)

Total population
- 78,350 Argentine citizens

Regions with significant populations
- São Paulo · Rio de Janeiro · Santa Catarina · Rio Grande do Sul · Paraná · Minas Gerais

Languages
- Rioplatense Spanish and Brazilian Portuguese

Religion
- Predominaltely Roman Catholicism, Other minorities

Related ethnic groups
- Argentines

Argentine Brazilian (Portuguese: Argentino-brasileiro, Spanish: Argentino-brasileño, Rioplatense Spanish: Argentino-brasilero) is a Brazilian person of full, partial, or predominantly Argentine ancestry, or an Argentine-born person residing in Brazil.

Recently, because of the economic recession that had been affecting Argentina since 2018 and which intensified from 2020, some Argentines are moving to Brazil in search of better opportunities.

The runaway inflation rate, tax increases, the strict control of capital, the increase in Argentine company bankruptcies and the constant loss of value of the Argentine Peso, represent some of the factors that lead to the increase in Argentinian immigration to Brazil and other countries.

A growing Argentine migratory movement exists of young people and families to neighboring countries such as Brazil and Uruguay, as well as to other continents. The majority of the Argentine population is financially dependent on the state. And the main reason to leave is to escape Argentine hyperinflation.

Another factor that facilitates the entry of Argentines to Brazil is, citizens of Mercosur countries have freedom of movement within the member countries, being able to access other member states without having to apply for a visa, having the right to permanent residence and after completing a residence period and requirements, can obtain citizenship of the country in which they are living.

== Main Argentine communities in Brazil ==
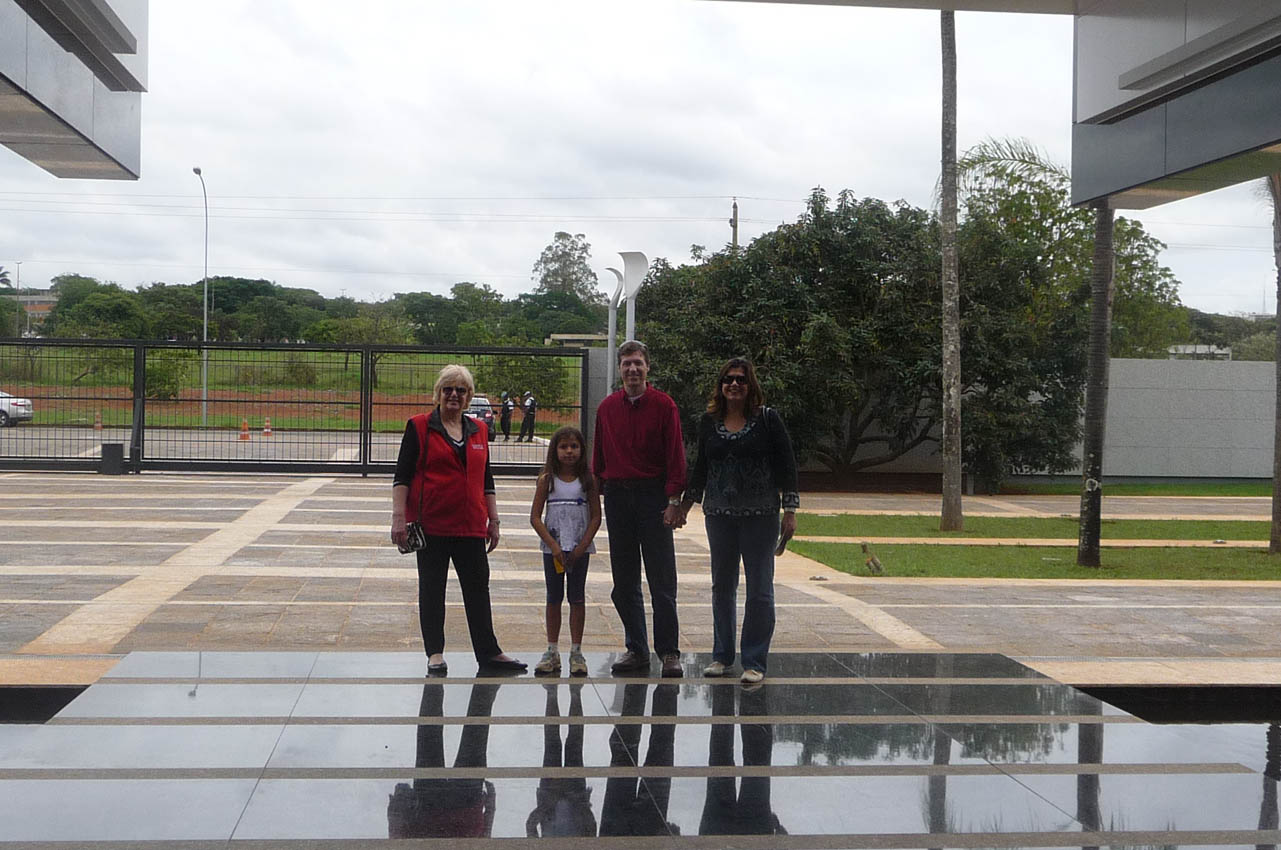
Group of Argentines outside the Argentine Embassy in Brasília.

- São Paulo
- Rio de Janeiro
- Florianópolis
- Armação de Búzios
- Curitiba
- Porto Alegre
- Balneário Camboriú
- Belo Horizonte
- Campinas
- Foz do Iguaçu

== Notable Argentine Brazilians ==
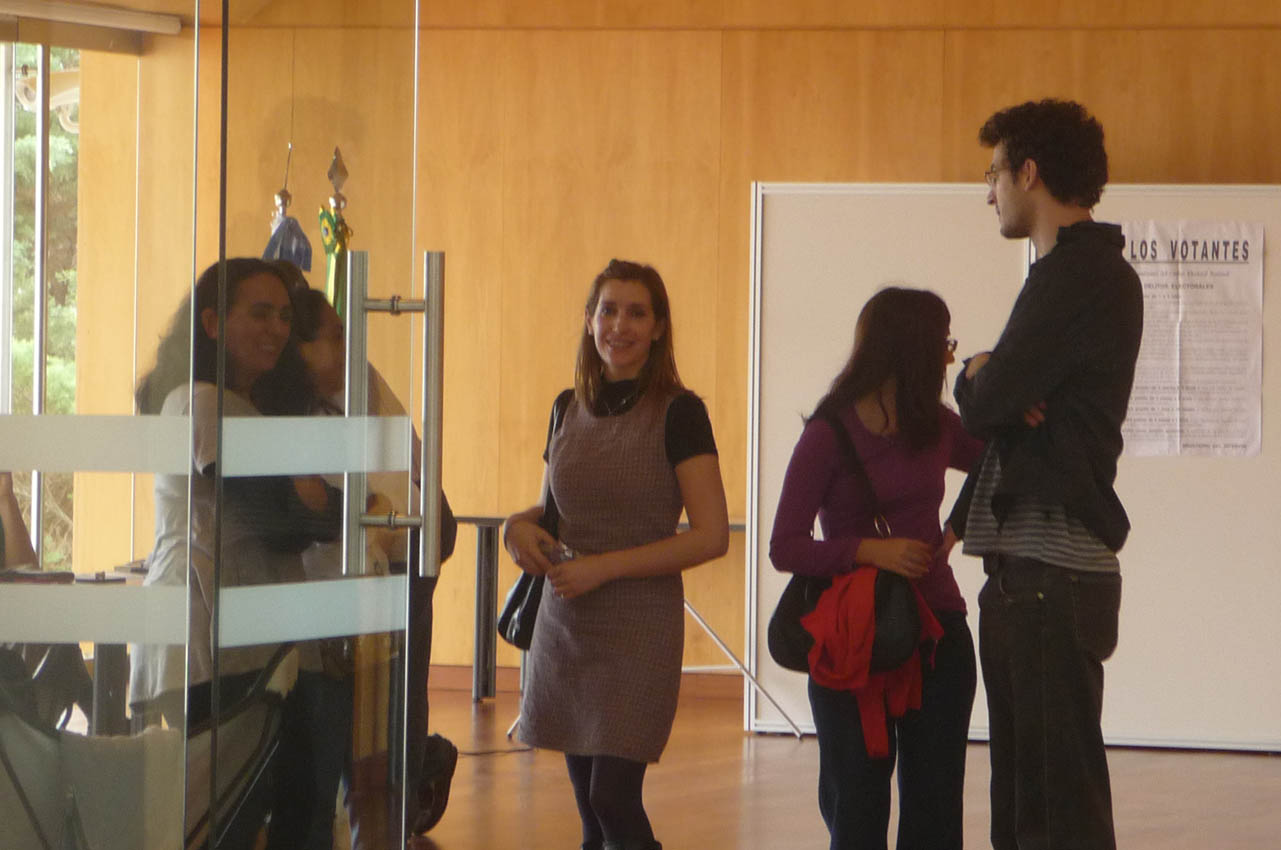
Group of Argentines inside the Argentine Embassy in Brasília.

- Adriana Prieto
- Amaury Pasos
- Antônio Salvador Sucar
- Carolina Ardohain
- Claudio Slon
- Dany Roland
- Fernando Meligeni
- Héctor Babenco
- João Paulo Cuenca
- Luis Favre
- Miguel Rolando Covian
- Paola Carosella
- Patricia Maldonado
- Pit Passarell
- Renata Fronzi
- Sebastián Cuattrin
- Yasmin Brunet

== See also ==
- Argentina–Brazil relations
- Immigration to Brazil
- Argentines
- White Brazilian
- Argentine people
