= Ruth Nortje =

American canoeist (born 1967)

Personal information
- Born: 17 January 1967 (age 59) Polokwane, South Africa

Sport
- Sport: Canoeing
Medal record
Representing United States
Women's canoe sprint
Pan American Games
Gold medal – first place	2003 Santo Domingo	K-1 500 m
Gold medal – first place	2003 Santo Domingo	K-2 500 m
Silver medal – second place	2003 Santo Domingo	K-4 500 m

Ruth Nortje (born 17 January 1967) is a South African-born, American canoe sprinter who competed from the mid-1990s to the early 2000s (decade). She won three medals for the United States at the 2003 Pan American Games in Santo Domingo.

Nortje also competed for South Africa in two Summer Olympics, earning her best finish of seventh in the K-1 500 m event at Sydney in 2000.
