= Karel Leština =

Czech sprint canoer (born 1973)

Karel Sango Leština (born 23 March 1973 in Kadaň) is a Czech sprint canoeist who competed from the mid-1990s to the early 2000s (decade). At the 1996 Summer Olympics in Atlanta, he was eliminated in the semifinals of the K-2 500 m and K-4 1000 m events. Four years later in Sydney, Leština was eliminated in the semifinals of the K-4 1000 m event.
