= Vidas Kupčinskas =

Lithuanian sprint canoer (born 1971)

Vidas Kupčinskas (born January 24, 1971) is a Lithuanian sprint canoer who competed in the mid-1990s. At the 1996 Summer Olympics in Atlanta, he was eliminated in the semifinals of both the K-2 500 m and the K-2 1000 m events.
