= Kathryn Colin =

American canoeist

Personal information
- Born: February 6, 1974 (age 52) Kailua, Hawaii, United States

Sport
- Sport: Flatwater Kayaker
Medal record
Representing United States
Pan American Games
Gold medal – first place	2003 Santo Domingo	K-2 500 m
Silver medal – second place	1999 Winnipeg	K-1 500 m
Silver medal – second place	1999 Winnipeg	K-2 500 m
Silver medal – second place	2003 Santo Domingo	K-4 500 m
Bronze medal – third place	1999 Winnipeg	K-4 500 m

Kathryn "Kathy" A. Colin (Latham) (born February 6, 1974) is an American flatwater kayaker who competed in the early to mid-2000s. She won two medals at the 2003 Pan American Games in Santo Domingo, Dominican Republic with a gold in the K-2 500 m event and a silver in the K-4 500 m event.

Colin also competed in two Summer Olympics, but was eliminated in the semifinals of each of the four events she competed.
