= Daniele Scarpa =

Italian sprint canoeist

Personal information
- Nationality: Italian
- Born: 3 January 1964 (age 62) Venice, Italy

Sport
- Sport: Canoeing
- Event: Canoe sprint
- Club: G.S. Fiamme Oro
- Retired: 2009
Medal record
Men's canoe sprint
Olympic Games
Gold medal – first place	1996 Atlanta	K-2 1000 m
Silver medal – second place	1996 Atlanta	K-2 500 m
World Championships
Gold medal – first place	1995 Duisburg	K-2 500 m
Gold medal – first place	1995 Duisburg	K-2 1000 m
Silver medal – second place	1993 Copenhagen	K-2 1000 m
Silver medal – second place	1994 Mexico City	K-2 1000 m
Bronze medal – third place	1985 Mechelen	K-2 10000 m

Daniele Scarpa (born 3 January 1964) is an Italian canoe sprinter who competed from the mid-1980s to 1997. Competing in four Summer Olympics, he won two medals at Atlanta in 1996 with a gold in the K-2 1000 m and a silver in the K-2 500 m events.

== Biography ==
Scarpa also won five medals at the ICF Canoe Sprint World Championships with two golds (K-2 500 m and K-2 1000 m: both 1995), two silvers (K-2 1000 m: 1993, 1994), and a bronze (K-2 10000 m: 1985).

He quit the national team in 1997 to what he claimed was widespread doping. Scarpa also was elected to the local government as a member of the Greens Party. Scarpa married the paralympian archer Sandra Truccolo in 2007 and they offer canoeing courses.

== See also ==
- List of ICF Canoe Sprint World Championships medalists in men's kayak
- List of Olympic medalists in canoeing (men)
