= Andrey Tissin =

Russian canoeist

Medal record

Men's canoe sprint

World Championships
Gold medal – first place	2001 Poznań	K-4 500 m
Silver medal – second place	1999 Milan	K-4 500 m
Silver medal – second place	2001 Poznań	K-4 200 m
Bronze medal – third place	1998 Szeged	K-4 500 m

Andrey Tissin (Russian: Андрей Тиссин; 5 July 1975 – 1 March 2008) was a Russian sprint canoer who competed in the late 1990s and early 2000s (decade). He won four medals at the ICF Canoe Sprint World Championships with a gold (K-4 500 m: 2001), two silvers (K-4 200 m: 2001, K-4 500 m: 1999), and a bronze (K-4 500 m: 1998).

Tissin also competed in the K-2 1000 m event at the 1996 Summer Olympics in Atlanta, but was eliminated in the semifinals. He lived in Krasnodar, and was 1.86 m (6 ft 1 in) tall, weighing 90 kg (200 lb).

Tissin later became a coach of the Russian national team, drowning during a training session in 2008.
