= Xu Haifeng (canoeist) =

Chinese canoeist

Xu Haifeng (born November 27, 1976) is a Chinese sprint canoeist who competed in the mid-1990s. At the 1996 Summer Olympics in Atlanta, he was eliminated in the repechages of both the K-2 500 m and the K-2 1000 m events.
