= Kyrgyzstan at the 1996 Summer Olympics =

- IOC code: KGZ
- NOC: National Olympic Committee of the Republic of Kyrgyzstan

in Atlanta
- Competitors: 33 (26 men and 7 women) in 9 sports
- Flag bearer: Sergey Ashikhmin
- Medals: Gold 0 Silver 0 Bronze 0 Total 0

Summer Olympics appearances (overview)
- 1996; 2000; 2004; 2008; 2012; 2016; 2020; 2024

Other related appearances
- Russian Empire (1900–1912); Soviet Union (1952–1988); Unified Team (1992)

Kyrgyzstan competed in the Summer Olympic Games as an independent nation for the first time at the 1996 Summer Olympics in Atlanta, United States. Previously, Kyrgyz athletes had competed for the Unified Team at the 1992 Summer Olympics.

== Results by event ==
=== Athletics ===
Men's 100 metres

- Vladislav Chernobay

Men's 800 metres

- Boris Kaveshnikov

Men's Marathon

- Nazirdin Akilbekov — 2:23:59 (→ 63rd place)

Men's 110 metres Hurdles

- Yevgeny Shorokhov

Men's Triple Jump

- Maksim Smetanin

Women's Marathon

- Irina Bogachova — 2:35.44 (→ 21st place)

=== Boxing ===
Men's Lightweight (– 60 kg)

- Sergey Kopenkin

- First Round — Defeated Cristian Giantomassi (Italy), 12-11
- Second Round — Lost to Leonard Doroftei (Romania), 1-10

Men's Welterweight (– 67 kg)

- Nourbek Kassenov

- First Round — Defeated Shane Heaps (Tonga), 11-2
- Second Round — Lost to Nariman Atayev (Uzbekistan), 7-11

Men's Heavyweight (– 91 kg)

- Andrey Kurnyavka

- First Round — Lost to Félix Savón (Cuba), 3-9

=== Canoeing ===
Men's Kayak Doubles (500 metres)

- Andrey Mitkovets
- Yury Ulyachenko

Men's Kayak Doubles (1,000 metres)

- Andrey Mitkovets and Yury Ulyachenko

=== Cycling ===
==== Track Competition ====
Men's Points Race

- Yevgeny Vakker

- Final — 1 point (→ 16th place)

=== Judo ===
Men's Heavyweight

- Vadim Sergeyev

Women's Extra-Lightweight

- Nataliya Kuligina

=== Modern Pentathlon ===
Men's Competition

- Igor Feldman – 4547 points (→ 30th place)

=== Shooting ===
Men's Air Pistol, 10 metres

- Yury Melentyev

Men's Free Pistol, 50 metres

- Yury Melentyev

Men's Air Rifle, 10 metres

- Yury Lomov

Men's Small-Bore Rifle, Three Positions, 50 metres

- Yury Lomov

Men's Small-Bore Rifle, Prone, 50 metres

- Yury Lomov

=== Swimming ===
Men's 100m Freestyle

- Sergey Ashikhmin

- Heat — 51.07 (→ did not advance, 29th place)

Men's 400m Freestyle

- Andrey Kvasov

- Heat — 4:00.69 (→ did not advance, 26th place)

Men's 200m Butterfly

- Konstantin Andriuchine

- Heat — 2:01.59 (→ did not advance, 26th place)

Women's 200m Breaststroke

- Oksana Cherevko

- Heat — 2:57.65 (→ did not advance, 40th place)

Men's 4 × 100 m Freestyle Relay

- Sergey Ashikhmin, Andrey Kvasov, Dmitri Lapine, and Vitaliy Vasilev

- Heat — 3:30.62 (→ did not advance, 18th place)

Men's 4 × 200 m Freestyle Relay

- Sergey Ashikhmin, Andrey Kvasov, Dmitri Lapine, and Vitaliy Vasilev

- Heat — 8:00.00 (→ did not advance, 17th place)

Men's 4 × 100 m Medley Relay

- Konstantin Priahin, Evgeni Petrachov, Konstantin Andriuchine, and Sergey Ashikhmin

- Heat — 3:56.24 (→ did not advance, 21st place)

Women's 4 × 200 m Freestyle Relay

- Viktoria Polejaeva, Olga Titova, Olga Korotaeva, and Olga Bogatyreva

- Heat — 8:45.76 (→ did not advance, 20th place)

=== Wrestling ===
Men's Greco-Roman Middleweight

- Raatbek Sanatbayev

Men's Freestyle Light-Flyweight

- Vladimir Torgovkin

Men's Freestyle Heavyweight

- Konstantin Aleksandrov

Men's Freestyle Super-Heavyweight

- Aleksandr Kovalevsky
