= Wu Yubiao =

Chinese canoeist (born 1975)

Wu Yubiao (born January 18, 1975) is a Chinese sprint canoer who competed in the mid-1990s. At the 1996 Summer Olympics in Atlanta, he was eliminated in the repechages of both the K-2 500 m and the K-2 1000 m events.
