= Niklaes Persson =

Swedish canoeist (born 1978)

Niklaes Persson (born October 5, 1978 in Stockholm) is a Swedish sprint canoer who competed in the early 2000s. At the 2000 Summer Olympics in Sydney, he finished eighth in the K-4 1000 m event.
