= Vitaly Anosov =

Uzbekistani sprint canoer (born 1977)

Vitaly Anosov (born June 7, 1977) is an Uzbekistani sprint canoer who was active in the mid-1990s. At the 1996 Summer Olympics in Atlanta, he was eliminated in the semifinals of the K-2 500 m event.
