= Shane Suska =

Australian sprint canoeist (born 1973)

Shane Suska (born 23 May 1973 in Maitland, New South Wales) is an Australian sprint canoeist who competed in the early 2000s. At the 2000 Summer Olympics in Sydney, he was eliminated in the semifinals of the K-4 1000 m event.
