= Marian Sîrbu =

Romanian sprint canoer (born 1976)

Medal record

Men's canoe sprint

World Championships
Bronze medal – third place	1999 Milan	K-4 1000 m

Marian Sîrbu (born January 29, 1976) is a Romanian sprint canoer who competed in the late 1990s and early 2000s. He won a bronze medal in the K-4 1000 m event at the 1999 ICF Canoe Sprint World Championships in Milan.

Sîrbu also competed in the K-4 1000 m event at the 2000 Summer Olympics in Sydney, but was eliminated in the semifinals.
