= Péter Almási =

Hungarian canoeist (born 1975)

Péter Almási (born 17 May 1975) is a Hungarian sprint canoeist who competed in the mid-1990s. He finished ninth in the K-2 1000 m event at the 1996 Summer Olympics in Atlanta.
