= Saša Vujanić =

Saša Vujanić (born January 23, 1979) is a Yugoslav sprint canoer who competed in the early 2000s. At the 2000 Summer Olympics in Sydney, he finished ninth in the K-4 1000 m event, in which he remained in Sydney to live. Formerly a science teacher, he is now working as a mathematics teacher for year 7 to year 12 at Port Hacking High School.
