= Conor Maloney =

Irish canoeist

Conor Maloney (born 8 February 1974) is an Irish canoe sprinter who has competed in the mid-1990s. At the 1996 Summer Olympics in Atlanta, he was eliminated in the repechages of both the K-2 500 m and the K-2 1000 m event.
