= Andrian Dushev =

Bulgarian sprint canoer

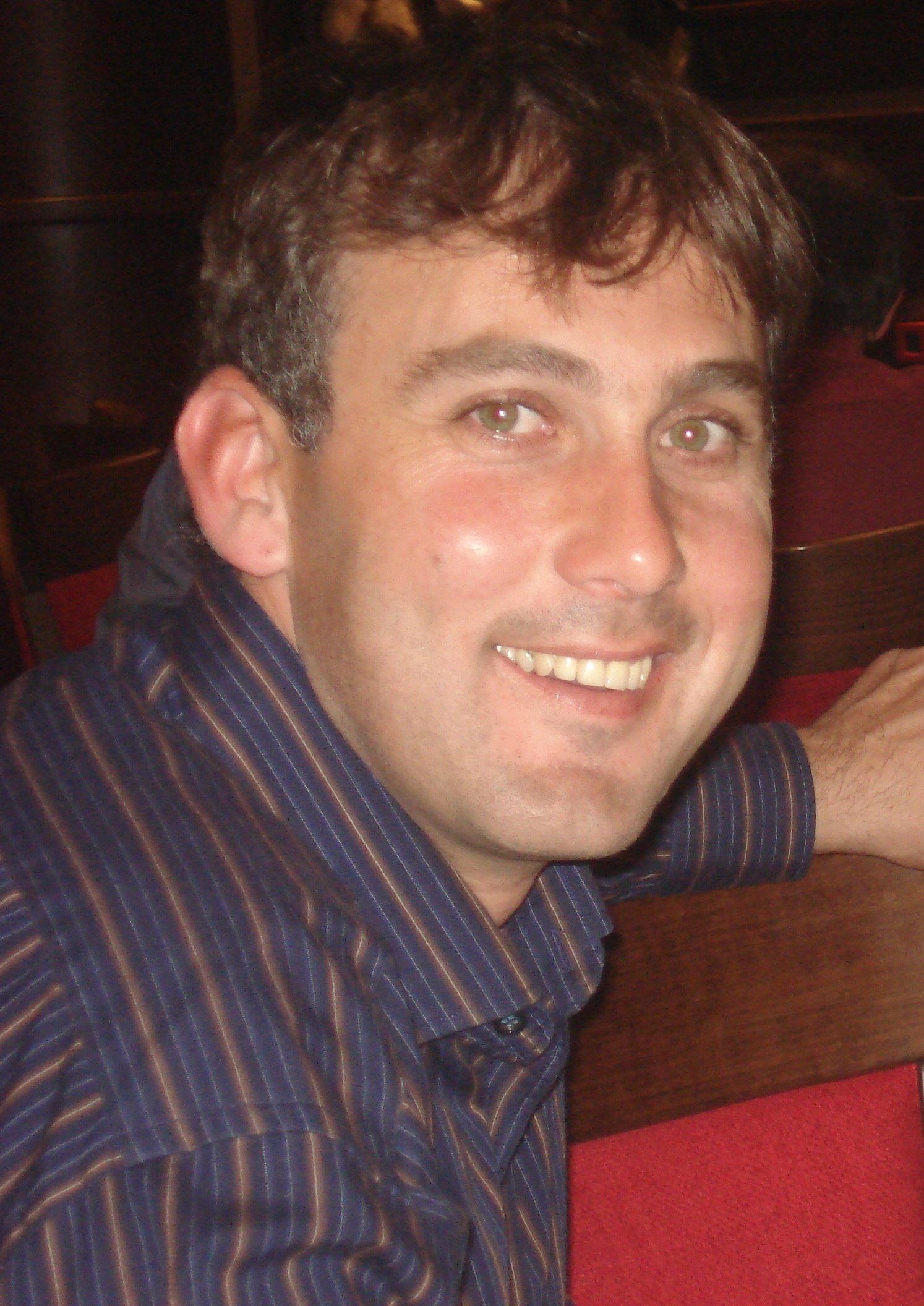

Personal information
- Born: Sofia
Medal record
Men's canoe sprint
Olympic Games
Bronze medal – third place	1996 Atlanta	K-2 1000 m
World Championships
Bronze medal – third place	1989 Plovidv	K-4 500 m
European Championships
Bronze medal – third place	1997 Plovidv	K-4 1000 m
Silver medal – second place	1999 Zagreb	K-4 500 m
Bronze medal – third place	2000 Poznańv	K-4 1000 m

Andrian Pavlov Dushev (Bulgarian: Андриан Павлов Душев; born June 6, 1970) is a Bulgarian sprint canoer who competed from the 1989 to 2000.

Republican champion many times during his career he was first called up to the national team of Bulgaria in 1989. In the same year he became a consultant at the “Levsky”-Sofia Sports Club (Canoe-Kayak).

== Achievements ==
- 1989 World Championships in Plovdiv, Bulgaria: K-4 500 m: bronze, K-2 500 m – 4th, K-2 1000 m – 4th, K-2 10000 m – 4th.
- 1990 World Championships in Poznań, Poland: K-1 500 m: 7th.
- 1995 World Championships in Duisburg, Germany: K-2 500 m – 5th, K-2 1000 m – 4th, K-1 200 m: 4th;
- 1996 Summer Olympics in Atlanta: K-2 1000 m – bronze, K-2 500 m – 8th.
- 1997 European Championships in Plovdiv, Bulgaria: K-2 1000m – bronze, K-2 500 m – 8th.
- 1997 World Championships in Dartmouth, Canada: K-1 200 m – 5th.
- 1999 European Championships in Zagreb, Croatia: K-4 500 m – silver, K-4 1000 m – silver, K-4 200 m – 7th.
- 1999 World Championships in Milan, Italy: K-4 1000 m – 5th.
- 2000 European Championships in Poznań, Poland: K-4 1000 m – bronze.

Between 1989 and 2000 Dushev was also part of the K-4 Bulgarian crew at the European and World Championships.

He was named as one of the ten best kayak sprinters of Bulgaria in the 20th century. He has received many awards from the President of the Republic of Bulgaria and is a winner of a medal for Olympic service awarded by the Bulgarian Olympic Committee.
