= Aleksandr Ivanik =

Russian canoeist

Medal record

Men's canoe sprint

World Championships
Gold medal – first place	1993 Copenhagen	K-4 500 m
Gold medal – first place	1994 Mexico City	K-4 1000 m
Gold medal – first place	1997 Dartmouth	K-4 200 m
Gold medal – first place	2001 Poznań	K-4 500 m
Silver medal – second place	1999 Milan	K-2 200 m
Silver medal – second place	1999 Milan	K-4 500 m
Silver medal – second place	2001 Poznań	K-4 200 m
Bronze medal – third place	1993 Copenhagen	K-4 1000 m
Bronze medal – third place	1998 Szeged	K-4 1000 m
Bronze medal – third place	2001 Poznań	K-4 1000 m
Bronze medal – third place	2003 Gainesville	K-4 500 m

Aleksandr Ivanik (born 26 February 1968) is a Russian sprint canoeist who competed from the early 1990s to the mid-2000s. He won eleven medals at the ICF Canoe Sprint World Championships with four golds (K-4 200 m: 1997, K-4 500 m: 1993, 2001; K-4 1000 m: 1994), three silvers (K-2 200 m: 1999, 2001; K-4 500 m: 1999), and four bronzes (K-4 500 m: 2003, K-4 1000 m: 1993, 1998, 2001).

Ivanik also competed in two Summer Olympics, but was eliminated in the semifinals for both games (1996: K-2 1000 m, 2000: K-2 500 m).
