= Karl Zaruba =

Austrian composer and conductor

Karl Zaruba (December 29, 1902 – October 5, 1978 ) was an Austrian composer, conductor and founder of the Neue Meister Deutsch Kapelle (Neue Deutschmeister Band).

He was the conductor of the Austrian Folk Musicians. and director of the Schuhplattler Dance Band.

== Discography ==
- The Merry Yodeler, (Musical LP, 1953, director)
- The Merry Yodeler, Volume II (Musical LP, 1953, director)
- Folk Dances of Austria, Vol. 3: Traditional Schuhplattler Dances, (LP 1962, director)
- The Neue Deutschmeister Band in Stereo (Neue Deutschmeister Band, Elektra EKS 7101 (Stereo), Released: 1958, conductor)

== Compositions ==
=== For the Kapelle ===
- Liebe Anna!
- Der Kirchschlager
- Am Brigitta Kirtag
- Bluembachtaler Schuhplattler
- Dachauer Schuhplattler
- Der Eiswalzer
- Der Jajermarsch
- Der Offene Walzer
- Edelweisser
- Enzianer Schuhplattler
- Heidauer Schuhplattler
- Kuckucks-Polka
- Mit Schwung, mars
- Petersdorfer Ländler
- Reit im Winkel
- Steffel von Talgau Schuhplattler
- Trauntalern Schuhplattler
- Watschenplattler

== For small ensembles ==
- Das Blumerl
- Das Hiatamadl
- Das Spinnrad
- Der Cevve
- Der Deutsche Umgang
- Der Haxenschmeisser
- Der Neudeutsche
- Der Siebenschritt
- Der Waldjager
- Die Ennstaler Polka
- Die Mainzer Polka
- Kreuzpolka
- Marching Polka
- Neubayrische
- Nickelsdorfer-Schottisch
- Reidlinger Schottische
- Rheinlander
- Steyrische Kreuzpolka
- Studentenpolka
- Weifentanz
