= Thor Nielsen =

Danish sprint and marathon canoeist (born 1959)

Medal record

Representing Denmark

Men's canoe sprint

World Championships
Gold medal – first place	1993 Copenhagen	K-1 10000 m
Gold medal – first place	1994 Mexico City	K-2 1000 m
Silver medal – second place	1987 Duisburg	K-2 10000 m
Silver medal – second place	1993 Copenhagen	K-1 1000 m
Bronze medal – third place	1985 Mechelen	K-4 10000 m

Men's canoe marathon

World Championships
Gold medal – first place	1988 Nottingham	K-2
Gold medal – first place	1990 Copenhagen	K-2
Silver medal – second place	1998 Cape Town	K-1

Thor Nielsen (born 11 July 1959) is a Danish] sprint and marathon canoeist who competed from the mid-1980s to the late 1990s. He won five medals at the ICF Canoe Sprint World Championships with two golds (K-1 10000 m: 1993, K-2 1000 m: 1994), two silvers (K-1 1000 m: 1993, K-2 10000 m: 1987), and a bronze (K-4 10000 m: 1985).

Nielsen also competed in two Summer Olympics, earning his best finish of sixth twice (K-2 500 m: 1992, K-2 1000 m: 1996).

Nielsen is currently working as the national coach of Denmark
