= Yury Uliachenko =

Kyrgyzstani canoeist

Yury Nikolayevich Uliachenko (Russian: Юрий Николаевич Уляченко; sometimes shown as Yury Ulyachenko, born January 25, 1973) is a Kyrgyzstani sprint canoer who has competed in the mid-1990s. At the 1996 Summer Olympics in Atlanta, he was eliminated in the repechages of both the K-2 500 m and the K-2 1000 m event.
