= Mark Vendeweyer =

Belgian sprint canoeist

Mark Vandeweyer (Neerpelt, 10 September 1972) is a Belgian canoe sprinter who has competed in the mid-1990s. At the 1996 Summer Olympics in Atlanta, he was eliminated in the semifinals of the K-2 500 m event and the repechages of the K-2 1000 m event.
