= Radek Záruba =

Czech sprint canoer (born 1979)

Radek Záruba (born 5 June 1979 in Děčín) is a Czech sprint canoeist who competed in the early 2000s. At the 2000 Summer Olympics in Sydney, he was eliminated in the semifinals of both the K-1 1000 m and the K-2 500 m events.
