= Stein Jorgensen =

American canoeist

Personal information
- Full name: Stein Arne Jorgensen
- Nationality: x
- Born: July 12, 1962 (age 63) San Diego, California, U.S.

Sport
- Sport: Canoeing
Medal record
Representing United States
World Championships
Gold medal – first place	1995 Duisburg	K-2 200 m
Pan American Games
Gold medal – first place	1995 Mar del Plata	K-2 500m
Gold medal – first place	1999 Winnipeg	K-2 500m
Gold medal – first place	1999 Winnipeg	K-4 1000m
Silver medal – second place	1995 Mar del Plata	K-4 1000m

Stein Arne Jorgensen (born July 12, 1962) is an American sprint canoer who has competed from the mid-1990s to the early 2000s (decade). He won a gold medal in the K-2 200 m event at the 1995 ICF Canoe Sprint World Championships in Duisburg.

Jorgensen also competed in two Summer Olympics, earning his best finish of sixth in the K-4 1000 m event at Sydney in 2000.

He was born in San Diego. He was one of the US team's coaches for the 2012 Summer Olympics, for the sprint canoe events.
