= Petar Sibinkić =

Bulgarian canoeist (born 1976)

Petar Sibinkić (Serbian: Петар Сибинкић; born January 10, 1976, in Novi Sad) is a Yugoslav-born retired Serbian and Bulgarian sprint canoer who competed from the mid-1990s to the early 2000s. Competing for FR Yugoslavia, he was eliminated in the repechages of the K-1 500 m event at the 1996 Summer Olympics in Atlanta. Four years later in Sydney, Sibinkić finished fifth in the K-2 1000 m and eighth in the K-4 1000 m event while competing for Bulgaria.
