= Sebastián Cuattrin =

Brazilian canoeist (born 1973)

Personal information
- Born: 6 September 1973 (age 53) Rosario, Santa Fé, Argentina
Medal record
Men's sprint canoeing
Representing Brazil
Pan American Games
Gold medal – first place	2007 Rio de Janeiro	K-4 1000 m
Silver medal – second place	1999 Winnipeg	K-1 1000 m
Silver medal – second place	1999 Winnipeg	K-2 1000 m
Silver medal – second place	2003 Santo Domingo	K-1 500 m
Silver medal – second place	2003 Santo Domingo	K-1 1000 m
Silver medal – second place	2003 Santo Domingo	K-4 1000 m
Silver medal – second place	2007 Rio de Janeiro	K-1 1000 m
Bronze medal – third place	1995 Mar del Plata	K-1 1000 m
Bronze medal – third place	1995 Mar del Plata	K-2 1000 m
Bronze medal – third place	1999 Winnipeg	K-2 500 m
Bronze medal – third place	1999 Winnipeg	K-4 1000 m

Sebastián Ariel Cuattrin (born September 6, 1973 in Rosario, Santa Fé, Argentina) is a retired Argentine Brazilian sprint canoer who competed from the early 1990s to the mid-2000s (decade). Currently, he is the Sprint Canoeing Committee supervisor in Brazilian Canoeing Confederation.

== Career ==
Cuattrin was the first Brazilian sprint canoer to compete in the Olympic Games (1992 Barcelona) and Pan American Games (1991 Havana). He competed in four Summer Olympics (1992 Barcelona, 1996 Atlanta, 2000 Sydney e 2004 Athens) and he earned his best finish of eighth in the K-1 1000 m event at Atlanta, United States in 1996.

Cuattrin is the most medalist in Brazilian canoeing at the Pan American Games. He won eleven medals.
