= Anne Polivka =

American economic statistician

Anne Elise Polivka is an American economic statistician known for her research on alternative work arrangements, outsourcing and the gig economy, and on the effects on the labor market of disasters including Hurricane Katrina and the COVID-19 pandemic, and for her work redesigning the Current Population Survey. She is research chief in the Office of Employment and Unemployment Statistics of the Bureau of Labor Statistics.

== Education and career ==
Polivka received a Ph.D. in economics from the University of Wisconsin–Madison in 1991, with the dissertation Trade adjustment assistance and workers' employment histories supervised by Glen George Cain.

She has worked in the Bureau of Labor Statistics since 1987; she took her current position there, as research chief in the Office of Employment and Unemployment Statistics, in 2004.

== Recognition ==
Polivka was the 2024 recipient of the Julius Shiskin Memorial Award for Economic Statistics, jointly sponsored by the Washington Statistical Society, the Business and Statistics Section of the American Statistical Association, and the National Association for Business Economics.
