= Gary E. Zaruba =

American painter

- Born: April 6, 1940; Belgrade, Nebraska, U.S.
- Died: October 16, 2014 (aged 74); Kearney, Nebraska, U.S.
- Education: University of Nebraska Omaha; University of Nebraska at Kearney; University of Nebraska–Lincoln
- Occupations: Art educator, painter, potter, museum director
- Spouse: Mary Zaruba
- Children: 2 daughters

Gary E. Zaruba (April 6, 1940 – October 16, 2014) was an American art educator, painter and potter. He was a professor of art at the University of Nebraska at Kearney, and the director of the Museum of Nebraska Art.

== Life ==
Zaruba was born on April 6, 1940, in Belgrade, Nebraska. He graduated from the University of Nebraska Omaha, where he earned a bachelor's degree, followed by a master's degree from the University of Nebraska at Kearney, and a doctor of education from the University of Nebraska–Lincoln.

Zaruba was a professor of art at the University of Nebraska at Kearney for 39 years, from 1965 to 2004. He was also a painter. He argued that patterns were more important than subject-matters in his paintings. Zaruba also worked in ceramics in the early part of his career. He was appointed as the director of the Museum of Nebraska Art in 1986.

With his wife Mary, Zaruba had two daughters, Janet Anderson and Karen Zaruba. He died on October 16, 2014, in Kearney, Nebraska. His work can be seen at the Museum of Nebraska Art.
