= Gary Mawer =

Irish sprint canoer (born 1969)

Gary Mawer (born 12 December 1969) is an Irish canoe sprinter who competed from the mid-1990s to the early 2000s (decade). At the 1996 Summer Olympics in Atlanta, he was eliminated in the repechages of both the K-2 500 m and the K-2 1000 m event. Four years later, Mawer was eliminated in the heats of the K-1 500 m event and the semifinals of the K-1 1000 m event. Gary now has a stake in his family's poultry business in the UK (Wrexham) and Ireland (Annyalla). He works alongside his father John Snr, Brother John Jnr and Susan. He used to compete alongside his brother in his younger days.

Other major Results:

World Ranked No# 1 in Marathon 2001 K1

2nd K1 World Marathon Champs 1996

9th 1000m K1 World Champs 1994 (first Irish person to make a Final)

6th 1000m K1 Pre-Olympic Games 1995

2x World Cup Marathon Winner

2nd x 4 and 3rd x1 @ World Cup Marathon

10 x Top 10 World Champs Finishes (2,4,4,5,7,8,8,9,9,10th)

18 x Winner (1st) of Liffey Descent (5x 2nd)

40+ x Irish Champion in Sprint and Marathon

10 x British Champion in Marathon and Sprint

Winner of the ICF Fair play Award @ the World Marathon Champion 1998 for Helping another Athlete in trouble in the race and then going on to finish 5th in K1 (this is only the 2nd time this award has been awarded )
