= Rami Zur =

American sprint canoer (born 1977)

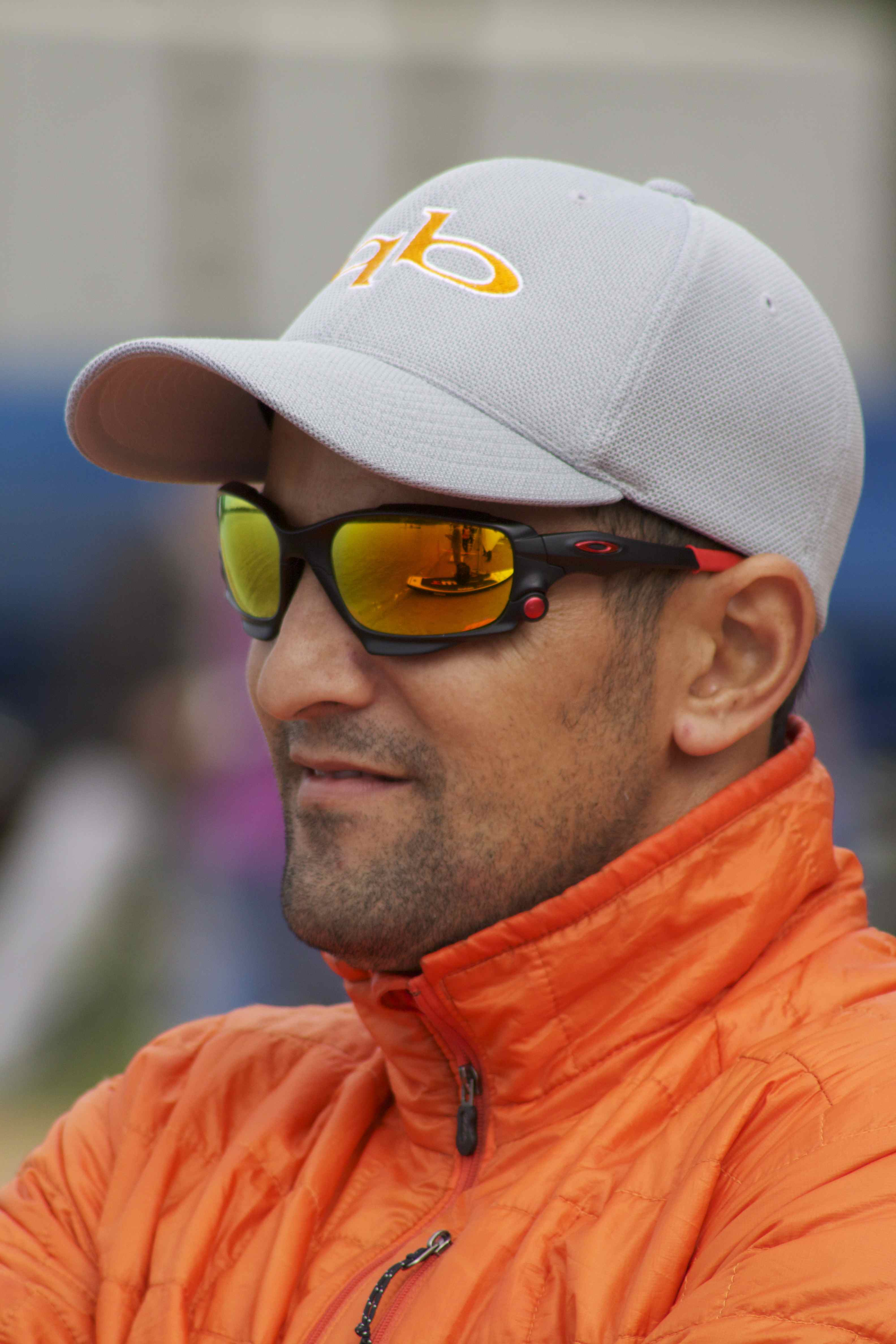
- Zur in 2013

Personal information
- Born: February 3, 1977 (age 49) Berkeley, California, United States

Sport
- Sport: Canoeing
Medal record
Representing United States
Pan American Games
Bronze medal – third place	2003 Santo Domingo	K-1 1000m

Rami Zur (born February 3, 1977) is an American sprint canoer who has competed since the late 1990s for Israel and later for the United States.

He competed for Israel at the 2000 Summer Olympics and for the United States at the 2004 and 2008 Olympics. In all competitions he was eliminated in the semifinals. He was born in Berkeley, California and is Jewish on his biological mother's side; he was later adopted and raised by an Israeli Jewish couple.

Zur is currently retired and coaches his wife Krisztina Fazekas Zur, who is an Olympic champion canoeist herself.
