= Yordan Yordanov (canoeist) =

Bulgarian sprint canoer (born 1981)

Medal record

Men's canoe sprint

World Championships
| Bronze medal – third place | 2002 Seville | K-4 1000 m |

Yordan Yordanov (Bulgarian: Йордан Йорданов; born June 9, 1981) is a Bulgarian sprint canoer who competed in the early to mid-2000s. He won a bronze medal in the K-4 1000 m event at the 2002 ICF Canoe Sprint World Championships in Seville.

Yordanov also competed in two Summer Olympics, earning his best finish of fourth in the K-4 1000 m at Athens in 2004.
