= Andrey Mitkovets =

Kyrgyzstani canoeist

Andrey Yuryevich Mitkovets (Russian: Андрей Юрьевич Митьковец; born September 25, 1974) is a Kyrgyzstani sprint canoer who has competed in the mid-1990s. At the 1996 Summer Olympics in Atlanta, he was eliminated in the repechages of both the K-2 500 m and the K-2 1000 m event.
