= Peter Newton (canoeist) =

American sprint kayaker

Personal information
- Born: June 3, 1970 (age 56) Honolulu, Hawaii, United States

Sport
- Sport: Canoeing
Medal record
Representing United States
Pan American Games
Gold medal – first place	1995 Mar del Plata	K1 500m
Gold medal – first place	1995 Mar del Plata	K2 500m
Gold medal – first place	1999 Winnipeg	K2 500m
Gold medal – first place	1999 Winnipeg	K4 1000m
Silver medal – second place	1991 Havana	K2 500m
Silver medal – second place	1999 Winnipeg	K1 500m

Peter Andrew Newton (born June 3, 1970 in Honolulu) is an American sprint kayaker who competed from the early 1990s to the early 2000s (decade). Competing in three Summer Olympics, he earned his best finish of sixth twice (2000: K-2 500 m, K-4 1000 m).

Newton was the first American kayaker to win three medals at a Pan American Games, winning two gold and a silver in 1995 Pan American Games.
