= Diego Cánepa (canoeist) =

Argentine canoeist (born 1976)

Diego Cánepa (born May 31, 1976) is an Argentine sprint canoeist who has competed in the mid-1990s. At the 1996 Summer Olympics in Atlanta, he was eliminated in the semifinals of the K-2 500 m event.
