= Paul Darby-Dowman =

British canoeist

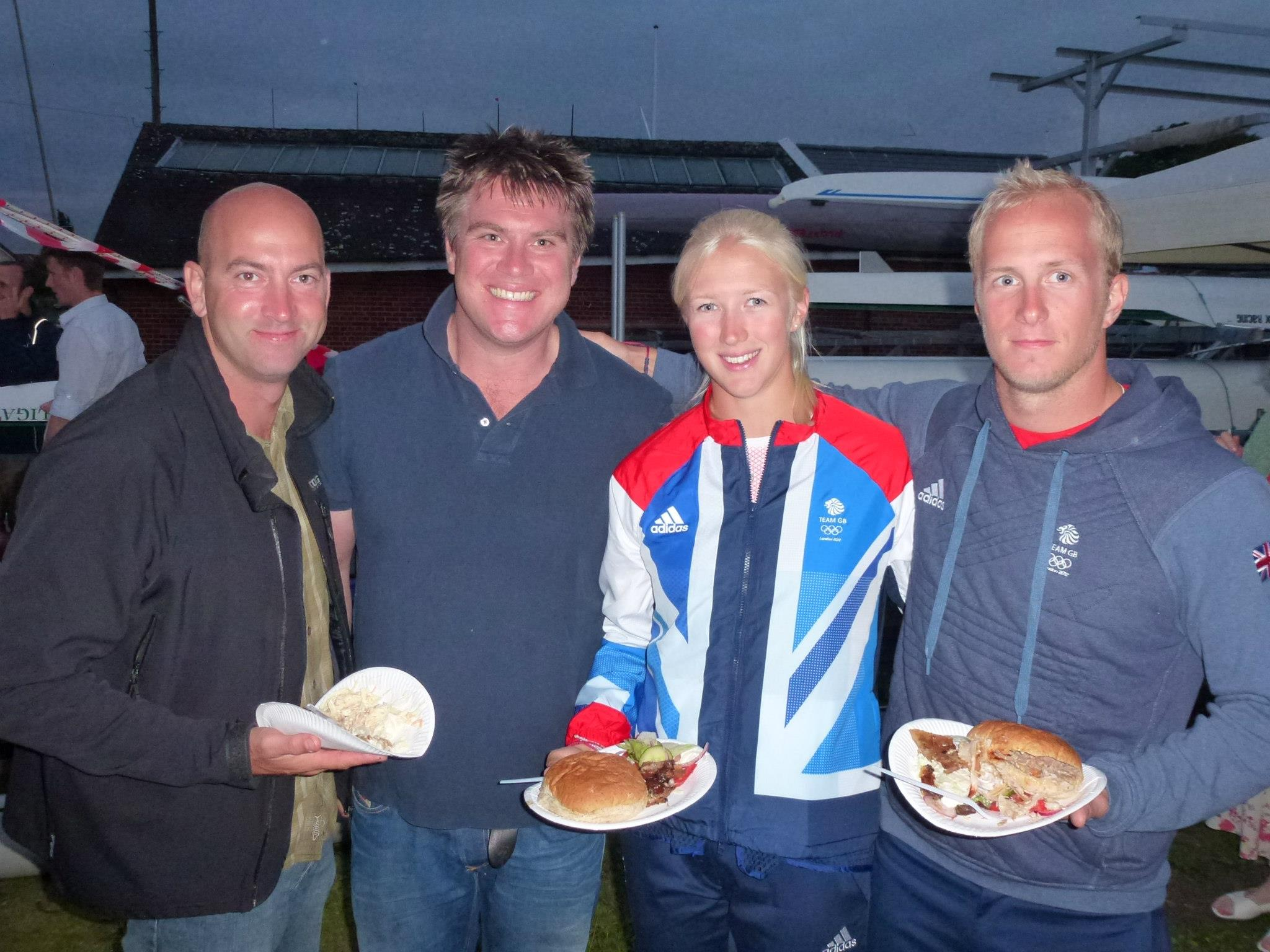
From left to right: Olympic canoeists Ian Wynne, Paul Darby-Dowman, Rachel Cawthorn and Jon Schofield celebrate the end of London 2012 at Royal Canoe Club

Paul Darby-Dowman (born 25 November 1977) is a British canoe sprinter who competed from the mid-1990s to the mid-2000s (decade). Competing in three Summer Olympics, he earned his best finish of seventh in the K-2 1000 m event at Athens in 2004.
