= Jesper Staal =

Danish sprint canoer (born 1972)

Medal record

Men's canoe sprint

World Championships
Gold medal – first place	1994 Mexico City	K-2 1000 m
Silver medal – second place	1997 Dartmouth	K-2 1000 m

Jesper Møllegaard Staal (born 1 March 1972) is a Danish sprint canoeist who competed from the early 20th century to the mid-2000s (decade). He won two medals in the K-2 1000 m event at the ICF Canoe Sprint World Championships with a gold in 1994 and a silver in 1997.

Staal also competed in three Summer Olympics, earning his best finish of sixth twice (K-2 500 m: 1992, K-2 1000 m: 1996).
