= Adam Seroczyński =

Polish canoeist (born 1974)

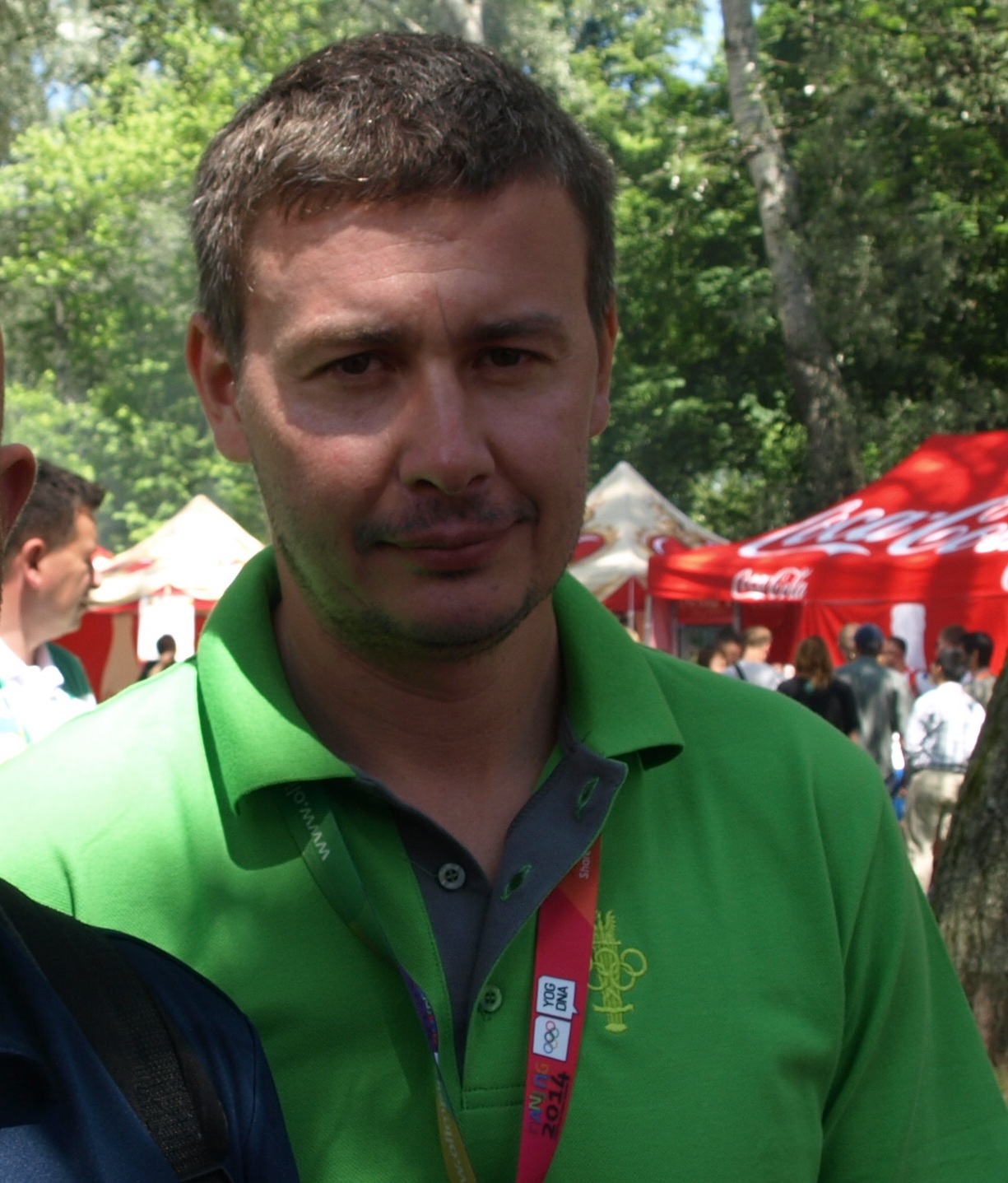
- Seroczyński in 2014

Personal information
- Full name: Adam Dariusz Seroczyński
- Born: 13 March 1974 (age 52) Olsztyn, Poland
- Height: 1.90 m (6 ft 3 in)
Medal record
Men's canoe sprint
Representing Poland
Event	1st	2nd	3rd
Olympic Games	0	0	1
World Championships	0	1	2
European Championships	1	1	1
European Games	0	0	0
Total	1	4	3
Olympic Games
Bronze medal – third place	2000 Sydney	K-4 1000 m
World Championships
Silver medal – second place	2007 Duisburg	K-2 1000 m
Bronze medal – third place	2002 Seville	K-1 1000 m
Bronze medal – third place	2006 Szeged	K-2 1000 m
European Championships
Gold medal – first place	1999 Zagreb	K4-1000 m
Silver medal – second place	2002 Szeged	K1-1000 m
Bronze medal – third place	2007 Pontevedra	K4-1000 m

Adam Dariusz Seroczyński (Polish pronunciation: [ˈadam ˈdarjuʂ sɛrɔˈt͡ʂɨj̃skʲi]; born 13 March 1974) is a Polish sprint canoeist who competed from 1997 to 2008. Competing in three Summer Olympics, he won a bronze medal in the K-4 1000 m event at Sydney in 2000. For his sport achievements, he received the Golden Cross of Merit in 2000.

Seroczyński also won three medals at the ICF Canoe Sprint World Championships with a silver (K-2 1000 m: 2007) and two bronzes (K-1 1000 m: 2002, K-2 1000 m: 2006).

He is now a member of the Posnania Poznań club. In September 2008, following the Beijing Olympics, Seroczyński tested positive for clenbuterol in a doping test. He was officially suspended for two years by the International Canoe Federation for his actions during the 2008 Summer Olympics and became the first canoeist to fail a doping test during the Summer Olympics.
