= Peter Scott (canoeist) =

Australian sprint canoeist (born 1973)

Medal record

Men's canoe sprint

World Championships
Bronze medal – third place	1997 Dartmouth	K-4 1000 m

Peter Scott (born 9 September 1973) is an Australian sprint canoeist who competed in the late 1990s and early 2000s (decade). He won a bronze medal in the K-4 1000 m event at the 1997 ICF Canoe Sprint World Championships in Dartmouth.

Scott also competed in two Summer Olympics, earning his best finish of seventh in the K-4 1000 m event at Atlanta in 1996.
