= John Mooney (canoeist) =

American sprint canoer (born 1964)

Personal information
- Full name: John Peter Mooney
- Born: August 6, 1964 (age 61) Eugene, Oregon, U.S.
- Height: 5 ft 10 in (1.77 m)
- Weight: 174 lb (79 kg)

Sport
- Sport: Canoe sprint
Medal record
Representing United States
World Championships
| Gold medal – first place | 1995 Duisburg | K-2 200 m |
Pan American Games
| Gold medal – first place | 1999 Winnipeg | K-4 1000m |

John Peter Mooney (born August 6, 1964) is an American sprint canoer who competed from the mid-1990s to the early 2000s (decade). He won a gold medal in the K-2 200 m event at the 1995 ICF Canoe Sprint World Championships in Duisburg.

Mooney also competed in two Summer Olympics, earning his best finish of sixth in the K-4 1000 m event at Sydney in 2000.

Mooney lives in Eugene, Oregon with his wife and two children.
