= Jiří Polívka (canoeist) =

Czech sprint canoer (born 1974)

Jiří Polívka (born 2 March 1974 in Hradec Králové) is a Czech sprint canoer who competed from the mid-1990s to the early 2000s (decade). At the 1996 Summer Olympics in Atlanta, he was eliminated in the semifinals of the K-2 500 m and K-4 1000 m events. Four years later in Sydney, Polívka was eliminated in the semifinals of the K-4 1000 m event.
