= Dariusz Białkowski =

Polish canoeist

Medal record

Men's canoe sprint
Event	1st	2nd	3rd
Olympic Games	0	0	2
World Championships	0	0	4
European Championships	1	1	1
European Games	0	0	0
Total	1	1	7

Olympic Games
Bronze medal – third place	1992 Barcelona	K-2 1000 m
Bronze medal – third place	2000 Sydney	K-4 1000 m

World Championships
Bronze medal – third place	1995 Duisburg	K-2 1000 m
Bronze medal – third place	1995 Duisburg	K-4 500 m
Bronze medal – third place	1995 Duisburg	K-4 1000 m
Bronze medal – third place	1997 Dartmouth	K-2 1000 m

European Championships
Gold medal – first place	1999 Zagreb	K4-1000 m
Silver medal – second place	1997 Zagreb	K2-1000 m
Bronze medal – third place	2004 Poznań	K4-1000 m

Dariusz Białkowski (born 16 July 1970 in Białogard) is a Polish sprint canoeist who competed from the early 1990s to the early 2000s (decade). Competing in three Summer Olympics, he won two bronze medals. Kotowicz won them in the K-2 1000 m in 1992 and in the K-4 1000 m in 2000. He represent club Astoria Bydgoszcz.

Białkowski also won four bronze medals at the ICF Canoe Sprint World Championships, earning them in the K-2 1000 m (1995, 1997), K-4 500 m (1995), and K-4 1000 m (1995) events.
