= Markus Oscarsson =

Swedish sprint kayaker (born 1977)

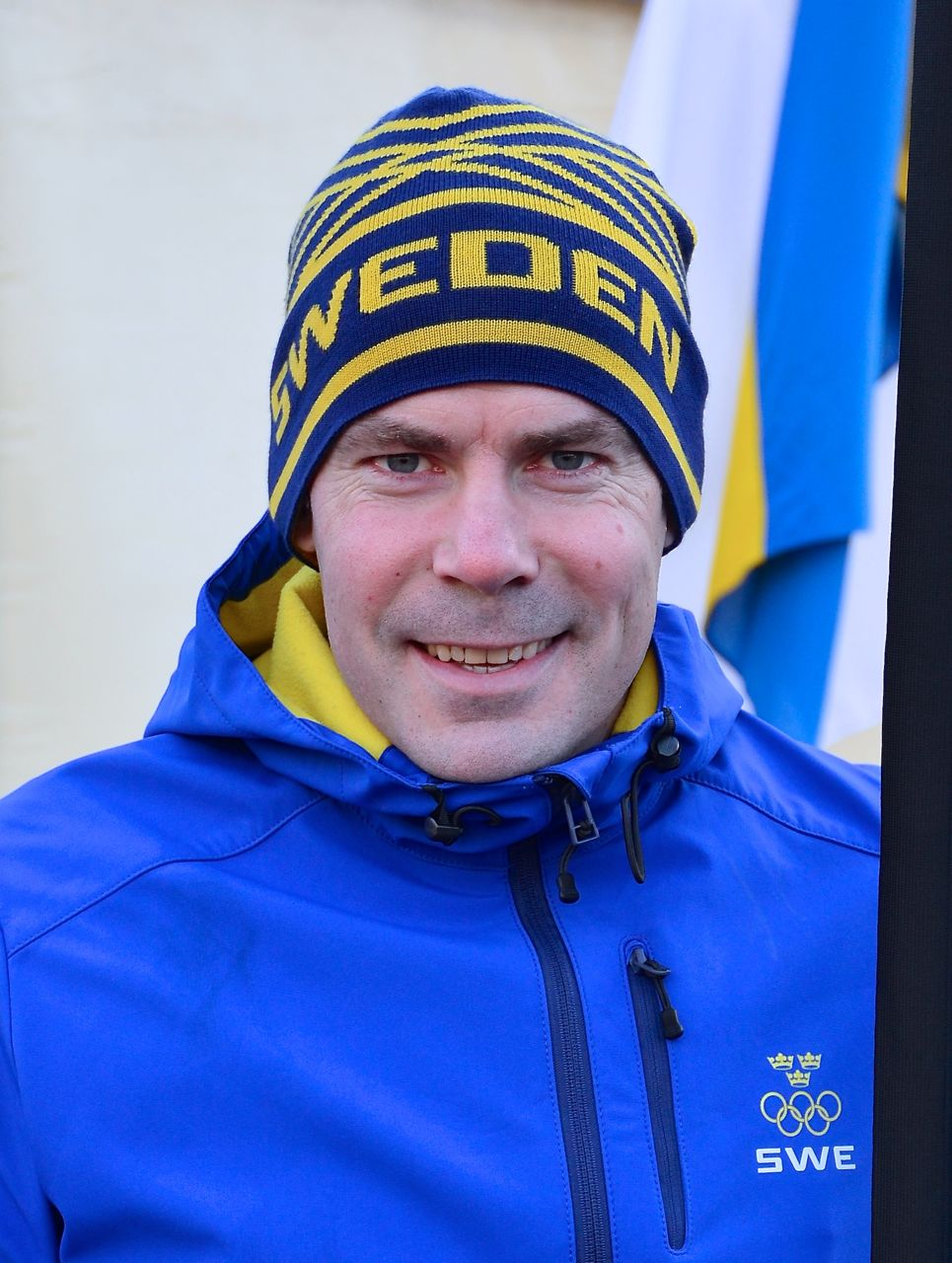
- Oscarsson in 2014

Medal record

Men's canoe sprint

Olympic Games
Gold medal – first place	2004 Athens	K-2 1000 m
Silver medal – second place	2000 Sydney	K-2 1000 m

World Championships
Gold medal – first place	2002 Seville	K-2 1000 m
Gold medal – first place	2003 Gainesville	K-2 1000 m
Gold medal – first place	2006 Szeged	K-1 1000 m
Silver medal – second place	2011 Szeged	K-2 1000 m
Bronze medal – third place	2001 Poznań	K-2 500 m

Markus Oscarsson (born 9 May 1977 in Västerås) is a Swedish sprint kayaker who has competed since 1995. Competing in five Summer Olympics, he won two medals in the K-2 1000 m event with a gold in 2004 and a silver in 2000.

Oscarsson won two silver medals at the 1995 World Junior Championships in Yamanashi, Japan, finishing behind Hungary's Zoltan Kammerer in both the K-1 500 m and K-1 1000 m finals.

He then formed a highly successful K2 partnership with Henrik Nilsson. They went on to become world champions in 2002 and 2003. They also won a bronze in the K-2 500 m event at the 2001 championships. It was with Nilsson that he won his gold and silver Olympic medals.

Oscarsson took a year off competitive canoeing in 2005. He returned to action in 2006 and won the K-1 1000 m bronze medal at the European Championships in Račice, Czech Republic - the first individual medal of his senior career. The following month he became K-1 1000 m world champion in Szeged, Hungary, edging out Britain's Tim Brabants by 0.06 sec. This was Sweden's first gold medal in canoeing's Blue Riband event since the late Gert Fredriksson's victory in 1954.

At the 2008 Summer Olympics, Oscarsson and Gustafsson were disqualified for leaving their lane. At the 2012 Summer Olympics, Oscarsson and Nilsson reached the final of the men's K-2 1000 m event, but finished in 5th place.

Oscarsson is 184 cm (6' 0) tall and weighs 84 kg (185 lb).
