= Milko Kazanov =

Bulgarian canoeist (born 1970)

Medal record

Men's canoe sprint

Olympic Games
Bronze medal – third place	1996 Atlanta	K-2 1000 m

World Championships
Bronze medal – third place	2002 Seville	K-4 1000 m

Milko Georgiev Kazanov (Bulgarian: Милко Георгиев Казанов, sometimes listed as Milko Kazakov, born 11 February 1970 in Rousse) is a Bulgarian sprint canoeist who competed from the early 1990s to 2005. Competing in four Summer Olympics, he won a bronze medal in the K-2 1000 m event at Atlanta in 1996.

Kazanov also won a bronze in the K-4 1000 m event at the 2002 ICF Canoe Sprint World Championships in Seville.

He has also won three European Championship medals, two silvers (K-4 500 m, K-4 1000 m) in Zagreb in 1999 and bronze (K-4 1000 m) in Poznań in 2000.

Kazanov is 186 cm (6 ft 1 in) tall and weighs 86 kg (190 lb). He is now a member of the Levski Canoe/Kayak Club in Sofia.
