= Javier Correa (canoeist) =

Argentine canoeist

Personal information
- Born: 17 July 1976 (age 50) San Carlos de Bariloche, Río Negro, Argentina

Sport
- Sport: Canoeing
Medal record
Men's canoe sprint
World Championships
Silver medal – second place	2001 Poznań	K-1 1000 m
Silver medal – second place	2002 Seville	K-1 1000 m
Bronze medal – third place	1998 Szeged	K-1 1000 m
Bronze medal – third place	2001 Poznań	K-1 500 m
Pan American Games
Gold medal – first place	2003 Santo Domingo	K-1 500 m
Gold medal – first place	2003 Santo Domingo	K-1 1000 m

Javier Andrés Correa (born 17 July 1976) is an Argentine sprint canoeist who competed from the late 1990s to the mid-2000s. He won four medals at the ICF Canoe Sprint World Championships with two silvers (K-1 1000 m: 2001, 2002) and two bronzes (K-1 500 m: 2001, K-1 1000 m: 1998).

Correa also competed in three Summer Olympics, earning his best finish of fifth in the K-1 1000 m event at Sydney in 2000. He also won the Platinum Konex Award from Argentina in canoeing in 2010.
