= Leobaldo Pereira =

Cuban canoeist (born 1972)

Medal record

Men's canoe sprint

Olympic Games
Silver medal – second place	2000 Sydney	C-2 1000 m

World Championships
Gold medal – first place	2001 Poznań	C-2 500 m
Silver medal – second place	1999 Milan	C-2 1000 m
Bronze medal – third place	2001 Poznań	C-2 200 m
Bronze medal – third place	2001 Poznań	C-2 1000 m

Leobaldo Pereira Pulido (born July 31, 1972) is a Cuban sprint canoeist who competed in the late 1990s and the early 2000s. He won the silver medal in the C-2 1000 m event at the 2000 Summer Olympics in Sydney.

Pereira also won four medals at the ICF Canoe Sprint World Championships with a gold (C-2 500 m: 2001), a silver (C-2 1000 m: 1999), and two bronzes (C-2 200 m and C-2 1000 m: both 2001).
