= List of Olympic medalists in canoeing (men) =

This is the complete list of men's Olympic medalists in canoeing.

== Current program ==
=== Slalom ===
==== C-1 ====
| Games | Gold | Silver | Bronze |
|---|---|---|---|
| 1972 Munich | Reinhard Eiben; East Germany | Reinhold Kauder; West Germany | Jamie McEwan; United States |
| 1976–1988 | not included in the Olympic program | | |
| 1992 Barcelona | Lukáš Pollert; Czechoslovakia | Gareth Marriott; Great Britain | Jacky Avril; France |
| 1996 Atlanta | Michal Martikán; Slovakia | Lukáš Pollert; Czech Republic | Patrice Estanguet; France |
| 2000 Sydney | Tony Estanguet; France | Michal Martikán; Slovakia | Juraj Minčík; Slovakia |
| 2004 Athens | Tony Estanguet; France | Michal Martikán; Slovakia | Stefan Pfannmöller; Germany |
| 2008 Beijing | Michal Martikán; Slovakia | David Florence; Great Britain | Robin Bell; Australia |
| 2012 London | Tony Estanguet; France | Sideris Tasiadis; Germany | Michal Martikán; Slovakia |
| 2016 Rio de Janeiro | Denis Chanut; France | Matej Beňuš; Slovakia | Takuya Haneda; Japan |
| 2020 Tokyo | Benjamin Savšek; Slovenia | Lukáš Rohan; Czech Republic | Sideris Tasiadis; Germany |
| 2024 Paris | Nicolas Gestin; France | Adam Burgess; Great Britain | Matej Beňuš; Slovakia |
| 2028 Los Angeles | | | |

==== K-1 ====
| Games | Gold | Silver | Bronze |
|---|---|---|---|
| 1972 Munich | Siegbert Horn; East Germany | Norbert Sattler; Austria | Harald Gimpel; East Germany |
| 1976–1988 | not included in the Olympic program | | |
| 1992 Barcelona | Pierpaolo Ferrazzi; Italy | Sylvain Curinier; France | Jochen Lettmann; Germany |
| 1996 Atlanta | Oliver Fix; Germany | Andraž Vehovar; Slovenia | Thomas Becker; Germany |
| 2000 Sydney | Thomas Schmidt; Germany | Paul Ratcliffe; Great Britain | Pierpaolo Ferrazzi; Italy |
| 2004 Athens | Benoît Peschier; France | Campbell Walsh; Great Britain | Fabien Lefèvre; France |
| 2008 Beijing | Alexander Grimm; Germany | Fabien Lefèvre; France | Benjamin Boukpeti; Togo |
| 2012 London | Daniele Molmenti; Italy | Vavřinec Hradilek; Czech Republic | Hannes Aigner; Germany |
| 2016 Rio de Janeiro | Joseph Clarke; Great Britain | Peter Kauzer; Slovenia | Jiří Prskavec; Czech Republic |
| 2020 Tokyo | Jiří Prskavec; Czech Republic | Jakub Grigar; Slovakia | Hannes Aigner; Germany |
| 2024 Paris | Giovanni De Gennaro; Italy | Titouan Castryck; France | Pau Echaniz; Spain |
| 2028 Los Angeles | | | |

==== Kayak cross ====
| Games | Gold | Silver | Bronze |
|---|---|---|---|
| 2024 Paris | Finn Butcher; New Zealand | Joe Clarke; Great Britain | Noah Hegge; Germany |
| 2028 Los Angeles | | | |

=== Sprint ===
==== C-1 1000 metres ====
| Games | Gold | Silver | Bronze |
|---|---|---|---|
| 1936 Berlin | Frank Amyot; Canada | Bohuslav Karlík; Czechoslovakia | Erich Koschik; Germany |
| 1948 London | Josef Holeček; Czechoslovakia | Douglas Bennett; Canada | Robert Boutigny; France |
| 1952 Helsinki | Josef Holeček; Czechoslovakia | János Parti; Hungary | Olavi Ojanperä; Finland |
| 1956 Melbourne | Leon Rotman; Romania | István Hernek; Hungary | Gennady Bukharin; Soviet Union |
| 1960 Rome | János Parti; Hungary | Aleksandr Silayev; Soviet Union | Leon Rotman; Romania |
| 1964 Tokyo | Jürgen Eschert; United Team of Germany | Andrei Igorov; Romania | Yevgeny Penyayev; Soviet Union |
| 1968 Mexico City | Tibor Tatai; Hungary | Detlef Lewe; West Germany | Vitaly Galkov; Soviet Union |
| 1972 Munich | Ivan Patzaichin; Romania | Tamás Wichmann; Hungary | Detlef Lewe; West Germany |
| 1976 Montreal | Matija Ljubek; Yugoslavia | Vasyl Yurchenko; Soviet Union | Tamás Wichmann; Hungary |
| 1980 Moscow | Lyubomir Lyubenov; Bulgaria | Sergei Postrekhin; Soviet Union | Eckhard Leue; East Germany |
| 1984 Los Angeles | Ulrich Eicke; West Germany | Larry Cain; Canada | Henning Lynge Jakobsen; Denmark |
| 1988 Seoul | Ivans Klementjevs; Soviet Union | Jörg Schmidt; East Germany | Nikolay Bukhalov; Bulgaria |
| 1992 Barcelona | Nikolay Bukhalov; Bulgaria | Ivans Klementjevs; Latvia | György Zala; Hungary |
| 1996 Atlanta | Martin Doktor; Czech Republic | Ivans Klementjevs; Latvia | György Zala; Hungary |
| 2000 Sydney | Andreas Dittmer; Germany | Ledis Balceiro; Cuba | Stephen Giles; Canada |
| 2004 Athens | David Cal; Spain | Andreas Dittmer; Germany | Attila Vajda; Hungary |
| 2008 Beijing | Attila Vajda; Hungary | David Cal; Spain | Thomas Hall; Canada |
| 2012 London | Sebastian Brendel; Germany | David Cal; Spain | Mark Oldershaw; Canada |
| 2016 Rio de Janeiro | Sebastian Brendel; Germany | Isaquias Queiroz; Brazil | Ilia Shtokalov; Russia |
| 2020 Tokyo | Isaquias Queiroz; Brazil | Liu Hao; China | Serghei Tarnovschi; Moldova |
| 2024 Paris | Martin Fuksa; Czech Republic | Isaquias Queiroz; Brazil | Serghei Tarnovschi; Moldova |
| 2028 Los Angeles | | | |

==== C-2 500 metres ====
| Games | Gold | Silver | Bronze |
|---|---|---|---|
| 1976 Montreal | Aleksandr Vinogradov and Serhei Petrenko; Soviet Union | Jerzy Opara and Andrzej Gronowicz; Poland | Tamás Buday and Oszkár Frey; Hungary |
| 1980 Moscow | László Foltán and István Vaskúti; Hungary | Ivan Patzaichin and Petre Capusta; Romania | Borislav Ananiev and Nikolai Ilkov; Bulgaria |
| 1984 Los Angeles | Matija Ljubek and Mirko Nišović; Yugoslavia | Ivan Patzaichin and Toma Simionov; Romania | Enrique Míguez and Narcisco Suárez; Spain |
| 1988 Seoul | Viktor Reneysky and Nicolae Juravschi; Soviet Union | Marek Dopierała and Marek Łbik; Poland | Philippe Renaud and Joël Bettin; France |
| 1992 Barcelona | Dmitri Dovgalenok and Aleksandr Maseikov; Unified Team | Ulrich Papke and Ingo Spelly; Germany | Martin Marinov and Blagovest Stoyanov; Bulgaria |
| 1996 Atlanta | György Kolonics and Csaba Horváth; Hungary | Viktor Reneysky and Nicolae Juravschi; Moldova | Gheorghe Andriev and Grigore Obreja; Romania |
| 2000 Sydney | Ferenc Novák and Imre Pulai; Hungary | Paweł Baraszkiewicz and Daniel Jędraszko; Poland | Mitică Pricop and Florin Popescu; Romania |
| 2004 Athens | Meng Guanliang and Yang Wenjun; China | Ibrahim Rojas and Ledis Balceiro; Cuba | Alexander Kostoglod and Aleksandr Kovalyov; Russia |
| 2008 Beijing | Meng Guanliang and Yang Wenjun; China | Alexander Kostoglod and Sergey Ulegin; Russia | Christian Gille and Tomasz Wylenzek; Germany |
| 2012–2020 | not included in the Olympic program | | |
| 2024 Paris | Liu Hao and Ji Bowen; China | Gabriele Casadei and Carlo Tacchini; Italy | Joan Antoni Moreno and Diego Domínguez; Spain |
| 2028 Los Angeles | | | |

==== K-1 1000 metres ====
| Games | Gold | Silver | Bronze |
|---|---|---|---|
| 1936 Berlin | Gregor Hradetzky; Austria | Helmut Cämmerer; Germany | Jaap Kraaier; Netherlands |
| 1948 London | Gert Fredriksson; Sweden | Johan Andersen; Denmark | Henri Eberhardt; France |
| 1952 Helsinki | Gert Fredriksson; Sweden | Thorvald Strömberg; Finland | Louis Gantois; France |
| 1956 Melbourne | Gert Fredriksson; Sweden | Igor Pissarov; Soviet Union | Lajos Kiss; Hungary |
| 1960 Rome | Erik Hansen; Denmark | Imre Szöllősi; Hungary | Gert Fredriksson; Sweden |
| 1964 Tokyo | Rolf Peterson; Sweden | Mihály Hesz; Hungary | Aurel Vernescu; Romania |
| 1968 Mexico City | Mihály Hesz; Hungary | Aleksandr Shaparenko; Soviet Union | Erik Hansen; Denmark |
| 1972 Munich | Aleksandr Shaparenko; Soviet Union | Rolf Peterson; Sweden | Géza Csapó; Hungary |
| 1976 Montreal | Rüdiger Helm; East Germany | Géza Csapó; Hungary | Vasile Dîba; Romania |
| 1980 Moscow | Rüdiger Helm; East Germany | Alain Lebas; France | Ion Bîrlădeanu; Romania |
| 1984 Los Angeles | Alan Thompson; New Zealand | Milan Janić; Yugoslavia | Greg Barton; United States |
| 1988 Seoul | Greg Barton; United States | Grant Davies; Australia | André Wohllebe; East Germany |
| 1992 Barcelona | Clint Robinson; Australia | Knut Holmann; Norway | Greg Barton; United States |
| 1996 Atlanta | Knut Holmann; Norway | Beniamino Bonomi; Italy | Clint Robinson; Australia |
| 2000 Sydney | Knut Holmann; Norway | Petar Merkov; Bulgaria | Tim Brabants; Great Britain |
| 2004 Athens | Eirik Verås Larsen; Norway | Ben Fouhy; New Zealand | Adam van Koeverden; Canada |
| 2008 Beijing | Tim Brabants; Great Britain | Eirik Verås Larsen; Norway | Ken Wallace; Australia |
| 2012 London | Eirik Verås Larsen; Norway | Adam van Koeverden; Canada | Max Hoff; Germany |
| 2016 Rio de Janeiro | Marcus Cooper Walz; Spain | Josef Dostál; Czech Republic | Roman Anoshkin; Russia |
| 2020 Tokyo | Bálint Kopasz; Hungary | Ádám Varga; Hungary | Fernando Pimenta; Portugal |
| 2024 Paris | Josef Dostál; Czech Republic | Ádám Varga; Hungary | Bálint Kopasz; Hungary |
| 2028 Los Angeles | | | |

==== K-2 500 metres ====
| Games | Gold | Silver | Bronze |
|---|---|---|---|
| 1976 Montreal | Joachim Mattern and Bernd Olbricht; East Germany | Vladimir Romanovsky and Serhei Nahorny; Soviet Union | Larion Serghei and Policarp Malîhin; Romania |
| 1980 Moscow | Sergei Chukhray and Vladimir Parfenovich; Soviet Union | Herminio Menéndez and Guillermo del Riego; Spain | Rüdiger Helm and Bernd Olbricht; East Germany |
| 1984 Los Angeles | Ian Ferguson and Paul MacDonald; New Zealand | Per-Inge Bengtsson and Lars-Erik Moberg; Sweden | Hugh Fisher and Alwyn Morris; Canada |
| 1988 Seoul | Ian Ferguson and Paul MacDonald; New Zealand | Igor Nagayev and Viktor Denisov; Soviet Union | Attila Ábrahám and Ferenc Csipes; Hungary |
| 1992 Barcelona | Kay Bluhm and Torsten Gutsche; Germany | Maciej Freimut and Wojciech Kurpiewski; Poland | Bruno Dreossi and Antonio Rossi; Italy |
| 1996 Atlanta | Kay Bluhm and Torsten Gutsche; Germany | Beniamino Bonomi and Daniele Scarpa; Italy | Daniel Collins and Andrew Trim; Australia |
| 2000 Sydney | Zoltán Kammerer and Botond Storcz; Hungary | Daniel Collins and Andrew Trim; Australia | Ronald Rauhe and Tim Wieskötter; Germany |
| 2004 Athens | Ronald Rauhe and Tim Wieskötter; Germany | Clint Robinson and Nathan Baggaley; Australia | Raman Piatrushenka and Vadzim Makhneu; Belarus |
| 2008 Beijing | Saúl Craviotto and Carlos Pérez; Spain | Ronald Rauhe and Tim Wieskötter; Germany | Raman Piatrushenka and Vadzim Makhneu; Belarus |
| 2012–2020 | not included in the Olympic program | | |
| 2024 Paris | Jacob Schopf and Max Lemke; Germany | Bence Nádas and Sándor Tótka; Hungary | Jean van der Westhuyzen and Thomas Green; Australia |
| 2028 Los Angeles | | | |

==== K-4 500 metres ====
| Games | Gold | Silver | Bronze |
|---|---|---|---|
| 2020 Tokyo | Germany; Max Rendschmidt; Ronald Rauhe; Tom Liebscher; Max Lemke | Spain; Saúl Craviotto; Marcus Walz; Carlos Arévalo; Rodrigo Germade | Slovakia; Samuel Baláž; Denis Myšák; Erik Vlček; Adam Botek |
| 2024 Paris | Germany; Max Rendschmidt; Ronald Rauhe; Tom Liebscher; Max Lemke | Australia; Riley Fitzsimmons; Pierre van der Westhuyzen; Jackson Collins; Noah Havard | Spain; Saúl Craviotto; Carlos Arévalo; Marcus Cooper; Rodrigo Germade |
| 2028 Los Angeles | | | |

== Discontinued events ==
=== Slalom ===
==== C-2 ====
| Games | Gold | Silver | Bronze |
|---|---|---|---|
| 1972 Munich | Walter Hofmann and Rolf-Dieter Amend; East Germany | Hans-Otto Schumacher and Wilhelm Baues; West Germany | Jean-Louis Olry and Jean-Claude Olry; France |
| 1976–1988 | not included in the Olympic program | | |
| 1992 Barcelona | Joe Jacobi and Scott Strausbaugh; United States | Jiří Rohan and Miroslav Šimek; Czechoslovakia | Frank Adisson and Wilfrid Forgues; France |
| 1996 Atlanta | Frank Adisson and Wilfrid Forgues; France | Jiří Rohan and Miroslav Šimek; Czech Republic | André Ehrenberg and Michael Senft; Germany |
| 2000 Sydney | Pavol Hochschorner and Peter Hochschorner; Slovakia | Krzysztof Kołomański and Michał Staniszewski; Poland | Marek Jiras and Tomáš Máder; Czech Republic |
| 2004 Athens | Pavol Hochschorner and Peter Hochschorner; Slovakia | Marcus Becker and Stefan Henze; Germany | Jaroslav Volf and Ondřej Štěpánek; Czech Republic |
| 2008 Beijing | Pavol Hochschorner and Peter Hochschorner; Slovakia | Ondřej Štěpánek and Jaroslav Volf; Czech Republic | Mikhail Kuznetsov and Dmitry Larionov; Russia |
| 2012 London | Timothy Baillie and Etienne Stott; Great Britain | David Florence and Richard Hounslow; Great Britain | Pavol Hochschorner and Peter Hochschorner; Slovakia |
| 2016 Rio de Janeiro | Ladislav Škantár and Peter Škantár; Slovakia | David Florence and Richard Hounslow; Great Britain | Gauthier Klauss and Matthieu Péché; France |

=== Sprint ===
==== C-1 200 metres ====
| Games | Gold | Silver | Bronze |
|---|---|---|---|
| 2012 London | Yuriy Cheban; Ukraine | Ivan Shtyl; Russia | Alfonso Benavides; Spain |
| 2016 Rio de Janeiro | Yuriy Cheban; Ukraine | Valentin Demyanenko; Azerbaijan | Isaquias Queiroz; Brazil |

==== C-1 500 metres ====
| Games | Gold | Silver | Bronze |
|---|---|---|---|
| 1976 Montreal | Aleksandr Rogov; Soviet Union | John Wood; Canada | Matija Ljubek; Yugoslavia |
| 1980 Moscow | Sergei Postrekhin; Soviet Union | Lyubomir Lyubenov; Bulgaria | Olaf Heukrodt; East Germany |
| 1984 Los Angeles | Larry Cain; Canada | Henning Lynge Jakobsen; Denmark | Costică Olaru; Romania |
| 1988 Seoul | Olaf Heukrodt; East Germany | Michał Śliwiński; Soviet Union | Martin Marinov; Bulgaria |
| 1992 Barcelona | Nikolay Bukhalov; Bulgaria | Michał Śliwiński; Unified Team | Olaf Heukrodt; Germany |
| 1996 Atlanta | Martin Doktor; Czech Republic | Slavomír Kňazovický; Slovakia | Imre Pulai; Hungary |
| 2000 Sydney | György Kolonics; Hungary | Maksim Opalev; Russia | Andreas Dittmer; Germany |
| 2004 Athens | Andreas Dittmer; Germany | David Cal; Spain | Maksim Opalev; Russia |
| 2008 Beijing | Maksim Opalev; Russia | David Cal; Spain | Yuriy Cheban; Ukraine |

==== C-2 1000 metres ====
| Games | Gold | Silver | Bronze |
|---|---|---|---|
| 1936 Berlin | Jan Brzák-Felix and Vladimír Syrovátka; Czechoslovakia | Rupert Weinstabl and Karl Proisl; Austria | Frank Saker and Harvey Charters; Canada |
| 1948 London | Jan Brzák-Felix and Bohumil Kudrna; Czechoslovakia | Stephen Macknowski and Steven Lysak; United States | Georges Dransart and Georges Gandil; France |
| 1952 Helsinki | Bent Peder Rasch and Finn Haunstoft; Denmark | Jan Brzák-Felix and Bohumil Kudrna; Czechoslovakia | Egon Drews and Wilfried Soltau; Germany |
| 1956 Melbourne | Alexe Dumitru and Simion Ismailciuc; Romania | Pavel Kharin and Gratsian Botev; Soviet Union | Károly Wieland and Ferenc Mohácsi; Hungary |
| 1960 Rome | Leonid Geishtor and Sergei Makarenko; Soviet Union | Francesco La Macchia and Aldo Dezi; Italy | Imre Farkas and András Törő; Hungary |
| 1964 Tokyo | Stepan Oshchepkov and Andrei Khimich; Soviet Union | Jean Boudehen and Michel Chapuis; France | Peer Nielsen and John Sørensen; Denmark |
| 1968 Mexico City | Ivan Patzaichin and Serghei Covaliov; Romania | Tamás Wichmann and Gyula Petrikovics; Hungary | Naum Prokupets and Mikhail Zamotin; Soviet Union |
| 1972 Munich | Vladas Česiūnas and Yuri Lobanov; Soviet Union | Ivan Patzaichin and Serghei Covaliov; Romania | Fedia Damianov and Ivan Burtchin; Bulgaria |
| 1976 Montreal | Aleksandr Vinogradov and Serhei Petrenko; Soviet Union | Gheorghe Simionov and Gheorge Danielov; Romania | Tamás Buday and Oszkár Frey; Hungary |
| 1980 Moscow | Ivan Patzaichin and Toma Simionov; Romania | Olaf Heukrodt and Uwe Madeja; East Germany | Vasyl Yurchenko and Yuri Lobanov; Soviet Union |
| 1984 Los Angeles | Ivan Patzaichin and Toma Simionov; Romania | Matija Ljubek and Mirko Nišović; Yugoslavia | Didier Hoyer and Eric Renaud; France |
| 1988 Seoul | Viktor Reneysky and Nicolae Juravschi; Soviet Union | Olaf Heukrodt and Ingo Spelly; East Germany | Marek Dopierała and Marek Łbik; Poland |
| 1992 Barcelona | Ulrich Papke and Ingo Spelly; Germany | Christian Frederiksen and Arne Nielsson; Denmark | Didier Hoyer and Olivier Boivin; France |
| 1996 Atlanta | Andreas Dittmer and Gunar Kirchbach; Germany | Marcel Glăvan and Antonel Borșan; Romania | Csaba Horváth and György Kolonics; Hungary |
| 2000 Sydney | Florin Popescu and Mitică Pricop; Romania | Ibrahim Rojas and Leobaldo Pereira; Cuba | Stefan Uteß and Lars Kober; Germany |
| 2004 Athens | Christian Gille and Tomasz Wylenzek; Germany | Aleksandr Kostoglod and Aleksandr Kovalyov; Russia | György Kozmann and György Kolonics; Hungary |
| 2008 Beijing | Aliaksandr Bahdanovich and Andrei Bahdanovich; Belarus | Christian Gille and Tomasz Wylenzek; Germany | György Kozmann and Tamás Kiss; Hungary |
| 2012 London | Peter Kretschmer and Kurt Kuschela; Germany | Aliaksandr Bahdanovich and Andrei Bahdanovich; Belarus | Alexey Korovashkov and Ilya Pervukhin; Russia |
| 2016 Rio de Janeiro | Sebastian Brendel and Jan Vandrey; Germany | Erlon Silva and Isaquias Queiroz; Brazil | Dmytro Ianchuk and Taras Mishchuk; Ukraine |
| 2020 Tokyo | Serguey Torres and Fernando Jorge; Cuba | Liu Hao and Zheng Pengfei; China | Sebastian Brendel and Tim Hecker; Germany |

==== K-1 200 metres ====
| Games | Gold | Silver | Bronze |
|---|---|---|---|
| 2012 London | Ed McKeever; Great Britain | Saúl Craviotto; Spain | Mark de Jonge; Canada |
| 2016 Rio de Janeiro | Liam Heath; Great Britain | Maxime Beaumont; France | Saúl Craviotto; Spain; Ronald Rauhe; Germany |
| 2020 Tokyo | Sándor Tótka; Hungary | Manfredi Rizza; Italy | Liam Heath; Great Britain |

==== K-1 500 metres ====
| Games | Gold | Silver | Bronze |
|---|---|---|---|
| 1976 Montreal | Vasile Dîba; Romania | Zoltán Sztanity; Hungary | Rüdiger Helm; East Germany |
| 1980 Moscow | Vladimir Parfenovich; Soviet Union | John Sumegi; Australia | Vasile Dîba; Romania |
| 1984 Los Angeles | Ian Ferguson; New Zealand | Lars-Erik Moberg; Sweden | Bernard Brégeon; France |
| 1988 Seoul | Zsolt Gyulay; Hungary | Andreas Stähle; East Germany | Paul MacDonald; New Zealand |
| 1992 Barcelona | Mikko Kolehmainen; Finland | Zsolt Gyulay; Hungary | Knut Holmann; Norway |
| 1996 Atlanta | Antonio Rossi; Italy | Knut Holmann; Norway | Piotr Markiewicz; Poland |
| 2000 Sydney | Knut Holmann; Norway | Petar Merkov; Bulgaria | Michael Kolganov; Israel |
| 2004 Athens | Adam van Koeverden; Canada | Nathan Baggaley; Australia | Ian Wynne; Great Britain |
| 2008 Beijing | Ken Wallace; Australia | Adam van Koeverden; Canada | Tim Brabants; Great Britain |

==== K-1 4 × 500 metre relay ====
| Games | Gold | Silver | Bronze |
|---|---|---|---|
| 1960 Rome | United Team of Germany; Dieter Krause; Günther Perleberg; Paul Lange; Friedhelm Wentzke | Hungary; Imre Szöllősi; Imre Kemecsey; András Szente; György Mészáros | Denmark; Erik Hansen; Helmuth Sørensen; Arne Høyer; Erling Jessen |

==== K-2 200 metres ====
| Games | Gold | Silver | Bronze |
|---|---|---|---|
| 2012 London | Alexander Dyachenko and Yury Postrigay; Russia | Raman Piatrushenka and Vadzim Makhneu; Belarus | Liam Heath and Jon Schofield; Great Britain |
| 2016 Rio de Janeiro | Saúl Craviotto and Cristian Toro; Spain | Liam Heath and Jon Schofield; Great Britain | Edvinas Ramanauskas and Aurimas Lankas; Lithuania |

==== K-2 1000 metres ====
| Games | Gold | Silver | Bronze |
|---|---|---|---|
| 1936 Berlin | Adolf Kainz and Alfons Dorfner; Austria | Ewald Tilker and Fritz Bondroit; Germany | Nicolaas Tates and Wim van der Kroft; Netherlands |
| 1948 London | Hans Berglund and Lennart Klingström; Sweden | Ejvind Hansen and Jakob Jensen; Denmark | Thor Axelsson and Nils Björklöf; Finland |
| 1952 Helsinki | Kurt Wires and Yrjö Hietanen; Finland | Lars Glassér and Ingemar Hedberg; Sweden | Maximilian Raub and Herbert Wiedermann; Austria |
| 1956 Melbourne | Meinrad Miltenberger and Michel Scheuer; United Team of Germany | Anatoly Demitkov and Mikhail Kaaleste; Soviet Union | Maximilian Raub and Herbert Wiedermann; Austria |
| 1960 Rome | Gert Fredriksson and Sven-Olov Sjödelius; Sweden | György Mészáros and András Szente; Hungary | Stefan Kapłaniak and Władysław Zieliński; Poland |
| 1964 Tokyo | Gunnar Utterberg and Sven-Olov Sjödelius; Sweden | Antonius Geurts and Paul Hoekstra; Netherlands | Heinz Büker and Holger Zander; United Team of Germany |
| 1968 Mexico City | Aleksandr Shaparenko and Vladimir Morozov; Soviet Union | Csaba Giczy and István Timár; Hungary | Gerhard Siebold and Günther Pfaff; Austria |
| 1972 Munich | Nikolai Gorbachev and Viktor Kratasyuk; Soviet Union | József Deme and János Rátkai; Hungary | Władysław Szuszkiewicz and Rafał Piszcz; Poland |
| 1976 Montreal | Vladimir Romanovsky and Serhei Nahorny; Soviet Union | Joachim Mattern and Bernd Olbricht; East Germany | Zoltán Bakó and István Szabó; Hungary |
| 1980 Moscow | Sergei Chukhray and Vladimir Parfenovich; Soviet Union | István Szabó and István Joós; Hungary | Luis Gregorio Ramos and Herminio Menéndez; Spain |
| 1984 Los Angeles | Hugh Fisher and Alwyn Morris; Canada | Bernard Brégeon and Patrick Lefoulon; France | Barry Kelly and Grant Kenny; Australia |
| 1988 Seoul | Greg Barton and Norman Bellingham; United States | Ian Ferguson and Paul MacDonald; New Zealand | Peter Foster and Kelvin Graham; Australia |
| 1992 Barcelona | Kay Bluhm and Torsten Gutsche; Germany | Gunnar Olsson and Kalle Sundqvist; Sweden | Grzegorz Kotowicz and Dariusz Białkowski; Poland |
| 1996 Atlanta | Antonio Rossi and Daniele Scarpa; Italy | Kay Bluhm and Torsten Gutsche; Germany | Andrian Dushev and Milko Kazanov; Bulgaria |
| 2000 Sydney | Antonio Rossi and Beniamino Bonomi; Italy | Markus Oscarsson and Henrik Nilsson; Sweden | Krisztián Bártfai and Krisztián Veréb; Hungary |
| 2004 Athens | Markus Oscarsson and Henrik Nilsson; Sweden | Antonio Rossi and Beniamino Bonomi; Italy | Eirik Verås Larsen and Nils Olav Fjeldheim; Norway |
| 2008 Beijing | Andreas Ihle and Martin Hollstein; Germany | Kim Wraae Knudsen and René Holten Poulsen; Denmark | Andrea Facchin and Antonio Scaduto; Italy |
| 2012 London | Rudolf Dombi and Roland Kökény; Hungary | Fernando Pimenta and Emanuel Silva; Portugal | Andreas Ihle and Martin Hollstein; Germany |
| 2016 Rio de Janeiro | Max Rendschmidt and Marcus Gross; Germany | Marko Tomićević and Milenko Zorić; Serbia | Ken Wallace and Lachlan Tame; Australia |
| 2020 Tokyo | Jean van der Westhuyzen and Thomas Green; Australia | Max Hoff and Jacob Schopf; Germany | Josef Dostál and Radek Šlouf; Czech Republic |

==== K-4 1000 metres ====
| Games | Gold | Silver | Bronze |
|---|---|---|---|
| 1964 Tokyo | Soviet Union; Nikolai Chuzhikov; Anatoli Grishin; Vyacheslav Ionov; Vladimir Morozov | United Team of Germany; Günther Perleberg; Bernhard Schulze; Friedhelm Wentzke; Holger Zander | Romania; Simion Cuciuc; Atanase Sciotnic; Mihai Țurcaș; Aurel Vernescu |
| 1968 Mexico City | Norway; Steinar Amundsen; Tore Berger; Egil Søby; Jan Johansen | Romania; Anton Calenic; Haralambie Ivanov; Dimitrie Ivanov; Mihai Țurcaș | Hungary; Csaba Giczy; Imre Szöllősi; István Timár; István Csizmadia |
| 1972 Munich | Soviet Union; Yuri Filatov; Yuri Stetsenko; Valeri Didenko; Vladimir Morozov | Romania; Aurel Vernescu; Mihai Zafiu; Roman Vartolomeu; Atanase Sciotnic | Norway; Egil Søby; Steinar Amundsen; Tore Berger; Jan Johansen |
| 1976 Montreal | Soviet Union; Sergei Chukhray; Aleksandr Degtyarev; Yuri Filatov; Vladimir Morozov | Spain; José María Esteban; José Ramón López; Herminio Menéndez; Luis Gregorio Ramos | East Germany; Frank-Peter Bischof; Bernd Duvigneau; Rüdiger Helm; Jürgen Lehnert |
| 1980 Moscow | East Germany; Rüdiger Helm; Bernd Olbricht; Harald Marg; Bernd Duvigneau | Romania; Mihai Zafiu; Vasile Dîba; Ion Geantă; Nicușor Eșanu | Bulgaria; Borislav Borisov; Bozhidar Milenkov; Lazar Khristov; Ivan Manev |
| 1984 Los Angeles | New Zealand; Grant Bramwell; Ian Ferguson; Paul MacDonald; Alan Thompson | Sweden; Per-Inge Bengtsson; Tommy Karls; Lars-Erik Moberg; Thomas Ohlsson | France; François Barouh; Philippe Boccara; Pascal Boucherit; Didier Vavasseur |
| 1988 Seoul | Hungary; Zsolt Gyulay; Ferenc Csipes; Sándor Hódosi; Attila Ábrahám | Soviet Union; Aleksandr Motuzenko; Sergey Kirsanov; Igor Nagayev; Viktor Denisov | East Germany; Kay Bluhm; André Wohllebe; Andreas Stähle; Hans-Jörg Bliesener |
| 1992 Barcelona | Germany; Mario Von Appen; Oliver Kegel; Thomas Reineck; André Wohllebe | Hungary; Ferenc Csipes; Zsolt Gyulay; Attila Ábrahám; László Fidel | Australia; Ramon Andersson; Kelvin Graham; Ian Rowling; Steven Wood |
| 1996 Atlanta | Germany; Thomas Reineck; Olaf Winter; Detlef Hofmann; Mark Zabel | Hungary; András Rajna; Gábor Horváth; Ferenc Csipes; Attila Adrovicz | Russia; Oleg Gorobiy; Sergey Verlin; Georgiy Tsybulnikov; Anatoli Tishchenko |
| 2000 Sydney | Hungary; Zoltán Kammerer; Botond Storcz; Ákos Vereckei; Gábor Horváth | Germany; Jan Schäfer; Mark Zabel; Björn Bach; Stefan Ulm | Poland; Grzegorz Kotowicz; Adam Seroczyński; Dariusz Białkowski; Marek Witkowski |
| 2004 Athens | Hungary; Zoltán Kammerer; Botond Storcz; Ákos Vereckei; Gábor Horváth | Germany; Andreas Ihle; Mark Zabel; Björn Bach; Stefan Ulm | Slovakia; Richard Riszdorfer; Michal Riszdorfer; Erik Vlček; Juraj Bača |
| 2008 Beijing | Belarus; Raman Piatrushenka; Aliaksei Abalmasau; Artur Litvinchuk; Vadzim Makhneu | Slovakia; Richard Riszdorfer; Michal Riszdorfer; Erik Vlček; Juraj Tarr | Germany; Lutz Altepost; Norman Bröckl; Torsten Eckbrett; Björn Goldschmidt |
| 2012 London | Australia; Tate Smith; David Smith; Murray Stewart; Jacob Clear | Hungary; Zoltán Kammerer; Dávid Tóth; Tamás Kulifai; Dániel Pauman | Czech Republic; Daniel Havel; Lukáš Trefil; Josef Dostál; Jan Štěrba |
| 2016 Rio de Janeiro | Germany; Max Rendschmidt; Tom Liebscher; Max Hoff; Marcus Gross | Slovakia; Denis Myšák; Erik Vlček; Juraj Tarr; Tibor Linka | Czech Republic; Daniel Havel; Lukáš Trefil; Josef Dostál; Jan Štěrba |

=== Marathon ===
==== C-1 10000 metres ====
| Games | Gold | Silver | Bronze |
|---|---|---|---|
| 1948 London | František Čapek; Czechoslovakia | Frank Havens; United States | Norman Lane; Canada |
| 1952 Helsinki | Frank Havens; United States | Gábor Novák; Hungary | Alfréd Jindra; Czechoslovakia |
| 1956 Melbourne | Leon Rotman; Romania | János Parti; Hungary | Gennady Bukharin; Soviet Union |

==== C-2 10000 metres ====
| Games | Gold | Silver | Bronze |
|---|---|---|---|
| 1936 Berlin | Václav Mottl and Zdeněk Škrland; Czechoslovakia | Frank Saker and Harvey Charters; Canada | Rupert Weinstabl and Karl Proisl; Austria |
| 1948 London | Stephen Macknowski and Steven Lysak; United States | Václav Havel and Jiří Pecka; Czechoslovakia | Georges Dransart and Georges Gandil; France |
| 1952 Helsinki | Georges Turlier and Jean Laudet; France | Kenneth Lane and Donald Hawgood; Canada | Egon Drews and Wilfried Soltau; Germany |
| 1956 Melbourne | Pavel Kharin and Gratsian Botev; Soviet Union | Georges Dransart and Marcel Renaud; France | Imre Farkas and József Hunics; Hungary |

==== K-1 10000 metres ====
| Games | Gold | Silver | Bronze |
|---|---|---|---|
| 1936 Berlin | Ernst Krebs; Germany | Fritz Landertinger; Austria | Ernest Riedel; United States |
| 1948 London | Gert Fredriksson; Sweden | Kurt Wires; Finland | Eivind Skabo; Norway |
| 1952 Helsinki | Thorvald Strömberg; Finland | Gert Fredriksson; Sweden | Michel Scheuer; Germany |
| 1956 Melbourne | Gert Fredriksson; Sweden | Ferenc Hatlaczky; Hungary | Michel Scheuer; United Team of Germany |

==== K-2 10000 metres ====
| Games | Gold | Silver | Bronze |
|---|---|---|---|
| 1936 Berlin | Paul Wevers and Ludwig Landen; Germany | Viktor Kalisch and Karl Steinhuber; Austria | Tage Fahlborg and Helge Larsson; Sweden |
| 1948 London | Gunnar Åkerlund and Hans Wetterström; Sweden | Ivar Mathisen and Knut Østby; Norway | Thor Axelsson and Nils Björklöf; Finland |
| 1952 Helsinki | Kurt Wires and Yrjö Hietanen; Finland | Gunnar Åkerlund and Hans Wetterström; Sweden | Ferenc Varga and József Gurovits; Hungary |
| 1956 Melbourne | János Urányi and László Fábián; Hungary | Fritz Briel and Theodor Kleine; United Team of Germany | Dennis Green and Walter Brown; Australia |

==== K-1 (folding) 10000 metres ====
| Games | Gold | Silver | Bronze |
|---|---|---|---|
| 1936 Berlin | Gregor Hradetzky; Austria | Henri Eberhardt; France | Xaver Hörmann; Germany |

==== K-2 (folding) 10000 metres ====
| Games | Gold | Silver | Bronze |
|---|---|---|---|
| 1936 Berlin | Erik Bladström and Sven Johansson; Sweden | Erich Hanisch and Willi Horn; Germany | Piet Wijdekop and Kees Wijdekop; Netherlands |
