= Canoeing at the 1988 Summer Olympics =

At the 1988 Summer Olympics in Seoul, twelve events in sprint canoe racing were contested. The program was unchanged from the previous Games in 1984.

== Medal table ==
| Rank | Nation | Gold | Silver | Bronze | Total |
|---|---|---|---|---|---|
| 1 | East Germany | 3 | 4 | 2 | 9 |
| 2 | Soviet Union | 3 | 3 | 0 | 6 |
| 3 | Hungary | 2 | 1 | 1 | 4 |
| 4 | United States | 2 | 0 | 0 | 2 |
| 5 | Bulgaria | 1 | 1 | 3 | 5 |
| 6 | New Zealand | 1 | 1 | 1 | 3 |
| 7 | Poland | 0 | 1 | 2 | 3 |
| 8 | Australia | 0 | 1 | 1 | 2 |
| 9 | France | 0 | 0 | 1 | 1 |
| 9 | Netherlands | 0 | 0 | 1 | 1 |
| Totals (10 entries) | | 12 | 12 | 12 | 36 |

== Medal summary ==
=== Men's events ===
| Games | Gold | Silver | Bronze |
|---|---|---|---|
| C-1 500 metres | Olaf Heukrodt; East Germany | Michał Śliwiński; Soviet Union | Martin Marinov; Bulgaria |
| C-1 1000 metres | Ivans Klementyev; Soviet Union | Jörg Schmidt; East Germany | Nikolay Bukhalov; Bulgaria |
| C-2 500 metres | Viktor Reneysky and Nicolae Juravschi; Soviet Union | Marek Dopierała and Marek Łbik; Poland | Philippe Renaud and Joël Bettin; France |
| C-2 1000 metres | Viktor Reneysky and Nicolae Juravschi; Soviet Union | Olaf Heukrodt and Ingo Spelly; East Germany | Marek Dopierała and Marek Łbik; Poland |
| K-1 500 metres | Zsolt Gyulay; Hungary | Andreas Stähle; East Germany | Paul MacDonald; New Zealand |
| K-1 1000 metres | Greg Barton; United States | Grant Davies; Australia | André Wohllebe; East Germany |
| K-2 500 metres | Ian Ferguson and Paul MacDonald; New Zealand | Igor Nagayev and Viktor Denisov; Soviet Union | Attila Ábrahám and Ferenc Csipes; Hungary |
| K-2 1000 metres | Greg Barton and Norman Bellingham; United States | Ian Ferguson and Paul MacDonald; New Zealand | Peter Foster and Kelvin Graham; Australia |
| K-4 1000 metres | Hungary; Zsolt Gyulay; Ferenc Csipes; Sándor Hódosi; Attila Ábrahám | Soviet Union; Aleksandr Motuzenko; Sergey Kirsanov; Igor Nagaev; Viktor Denisov | East Germany; Kay Bluhm; André Wohllebe; Andreas Stähle; Hans-Jörg Bliesener |

=== Women's events ===
| Games | Gold | Silver | Bronze |
|---|---|---|---|
| K-1 500 metres | Vanja Gesheva; Bulgaria | Birgit Schmidt; East Germany | Izabela Dylewska; Poland |
| K-2 500 metres | Birgit Schmidt and Anke Nothnagel; East Germany | Vanja Gesheva and Diana Paliiska; Bulgaria | Annemiek Derckx and Annemarie Cox; Netherlands |
| K-4 500 metres | East Germany; Birgit Schmidt; Anke Nothnagel; Ramona Portwich; Heike Singer | Hungary; Erika Géczi; Erika Mészáros; Éva Rakusz; Rita Kőbán | Bulgaria; Vanja Gesheva; Diana Paliiska; Ogniana Petkova; Borislava Ivanova |
