= Boháč =

Boháč (Czech pronunciation: [ˈboɦaːtʃ]; feminine: Boháčová) is a Czech surname, meaning 'rich man'. Notable people with the surname include:

- Daniel Boháč (born 1980), Czech ice hockey player
- Dwayne Bohac (born 1966), American businessman and politician
- Jan Boháč (born 1963), Czech canoer
- Josef Boháč (1914–1989), Czech ice hockey player
- Ladislav Boháč (1907–1978), Czech actor
- Marek Boháč (born 1988), Czech footballer
- Radek Boháč (born 1977), Czech curler

== See also ==
- Zsolt Bohács, Hungarian canoeist
