= Canoeing at the 1988 Summer Olympics – Men's K-4 1000 metres =

The men's K-4 1000 metres event was a fours kayaking event conducted as part of the Canoeing at the 1988 Summer Olympics program.

== Medalists ==
Gold	Silver	Bronze
Hungary; Zsolt Gyulay; Ferenc Csipes; Sándor Hódosi; Attila Ábrahám	Soviet Union; Aleksandr Motuzenko; Sergey Kirsanov; Igor Nagaev; Viktor Denisov	East Germany; Kay Bluhm; André Wohllebe; Andreas Stähle; Hans-Jörg Bliesener

== Results ==
=== Heats ===
18 crews entered in three heats on September 27. The top three finishers from each of the heats advanced directly to the semifinals while the remaining nine teams were relegated to the repechages.

Heat 1
1.	Zsolt Gyulay, Ferenc Csipes, Sándor Hódosi, and Attila Ábrahám (HUN)	2:58.54	QS
2.	Gilbert Schneider, Reiner Scholl, Dirk Joestel, and Thomas Reineck (FRG)	3:01.07	QS
3.	Knut Holmann, Morten Ivarsen, Arne Slettsjø, and Arne Johan Almeland (NOR)	3:01.54	QS
4.	Beniamino Bonomi, Daniele Scarpa, Alessandro Pieri, and Francesco Mandragona (ITA)	3:04.38	QR
5.	Didier Vavasseur, Christophe Petibout, Pierre Lubac, and Daniel Legras (FRA)	3:16.54	QR
6.	Seo Gyeong-Sek, Yun Yeong-Dae, Lee Yong-Cheol, and Kim Dong-Su (KOR)	3:23.32	QR
Heat 2
1.	Maciej Freimut, Wojciech Kurpiewski, Grzegorz Krawców, and Kazimierz Krzyżański (POL)	3:06.52	QS
2.	Michael Harbold, Terry White, Curt Bader, and Terry Kent (USA)	3:07.70	QS
3.	Bryan Thomas, Steven Wood, Grant Kenny, and Paul Gilmour (AUS)	3:10.32	QS
4.	Reuben Burgess, Robin Ayres, Jan Raciborski, and Adrian Collier (GBR)	3:16.71	QR
5.	Gustavo Cirillo, José Luis Marello, Fernando Chaparro, and Norberto Méndez (ARG)	3:23.33	QR
6.	Donald Brien, Colin Shaw, Kenneth Padvaiskas, and Renn Crichlow (CAN)	3:31.62	QR
Heat 3
1.	Kay Bluhm, André Wohllebe, Andreas Stähle, and Hans-Jörg Bliesener (GDR)	3:02.72	QS
2.	Aleksandr Motuzenko, Sergey Kirsanov, Igor Nagaev, and Viktor Denisov (URS)	3:03.30	QS
3.	Per-Inge Bengtsson, Lars-Erik Moberg, Kalle Sundqvist, and Bengt Andersson (SWE)	3:04.98	QS
4.	Juan Manuel Sánchez, Fernando Fuentes, Javier Álvarez, and Juan José Román (ESP)	3:06.96	QR
5.	Grant Bramwell, Brent Clode, John MacDonald, and Stephen Richards (NZL)	3:10.27	QR
6.	Nikolay Yordanov, Petar Godev, Borislav Tsvetkov, and Ivan Marinov (BUL)	3:15.00	QR

=== Repechages ===
Nine teams competed in two repechages on September 27. The top three finishers from each of the repechages advanced directly to the semifinals.

Repechage 1
1.	Beniamino Bonomi, Daniele Scarpa, Alessandro Pieri, and Francesco Mandragona (ITA)	3:06.90	QS
2.	Nikolay Yordanov, Petar Godev, Borislav Tsvetkov, and Ivan Marinov (BUL)	3:09.30	QS
3.	Grant Bramwell, Brent Clode, John MacDonald, and Stephen Richards (NZL)	3:11.27	QS
4.	Gustavo Cirillo, José Luis Marello, Fernando Chaparro, and Norberto Méndez (ARG)	3:24.16
5.	Seo Gyeong-Sek, Yun Yeong-Dae, Lee Yong-Cheol, and Kim Dong-Su (KOR)	3:26.79
Repechage 2
1.	Didier Vavasseur, Christophe Petibout, Pierre Lubac, and Daniel Legras (FRA)	3:16.68	QS
2.	Juan Manuel Sánchez, Fernando Fuentes, Javier Álvarez, and Juan José Román (ESP)	3:16.79	QS
3.	Donald Brien, Colin Shaw, Kenneth Padvaiskas, and Renn Crichlow (CAN)	3:16.80	QS
4.	Reuben Burgess, Robin Ayres, Jan Raciborski, and Adrian Collier (GBR)	3:17.54

=== Semifinals ===
The top three finishers in each of the semifinals (raced on September 29) advanced to the final.

Semifinal 1
1.	Zsolt Gyulay, Ferenc Csipes, Sándor Hódosi, and Attila Ábrahám (HUN)	3:07.16	QF
2.	Per-Inge Bengtsson, Lars-Erik Moberg, Kalle Sundqvist, and Bengt Andersson (SWE)	3:10.11	QF
3.	Beniamino Bonomi, Daniele Scarpa, Alessandro Pieri, and Francesco Mandragona (ITA)	3:12.44	QF
4.	Donald Brien, Colin Shaw, Kenneth Padvaiskas, and Renn Crichlow (CAN)	3:15.03
5.	Michael Harbold, Terry White, Curt Bader, and Terry Kent (USA)	3:15.60
Semifinal 2
1.	Aleksandr Motuzenko, Sergey Kirsanov, Igor Nagaev, and Viktor Denisov (URS)	3:09.07	QF
2.	Maciej Freimut, Wojciech Kurpiewski, Grzegorz Krawców, and Kazimierz Krzyżański (POL)	3:10.87	QF
3.	Didier Vavasseur, Christophe Petibout, Pierre Lubac, and Daniel Legras (FRA)	3:11.11	QF
4.	Grant Bramwell, Brent Clode, John MacDonald, and Stephen Richards (NZL)	3:15.90
-	Knut Holmann, Morten Ivarsen, Arne Slettsjø, and Arne Johan Almeland (NOR)	Did not finish
Semifinal 3
1.	Kay Bluhm, André Wohllebe, Andreas Stähle, and Hans-Jörg Bliesener (GDR)	3:06.80	QF
2.	Bryan Thomas, Steven Wood, Grant Kenny, and Paul Gilmour (AUS)	3:08.52	QF
3.	Gilbert Schneider, Reiner Scholl, Dirk Joestel, and Thomas Reineck (FRG)	3:09.67	QF
4.	Nikolay Yordanov, Petar Godev, Borislav Tsvetkov, and Ivan Marinov (BUL)	3:11.56
5.	Juan Manuel Sánchez, Fernando Fuentes, Javier Álvarez, and Juan José Román (ESP)	3:13.88

Norway's reason for not finishing was not disclosed in the official report.

=== Final ===
The final was held on October 1.

Gold	Zsolt Gyulay, Ferenc Csipes, Sándor Hódosi, and Attila Ábrahám (HUN)	3:00.20
Silver	Aleksandr Motuzenko, Sergey Kirsanov, Igor Nagaev, and Viktor Denisov (URS)	3:01.40
Bronze	Kay Bluhm, André Wohllebe, Andreas Stähle, and Hans-Jörg Bliesener (GDR)	3:02.37
4.	Bryan Thomas, Steven Wood, Grant Kenny, and Paul Gilmour (AUS)	3:03.70
5.	Maciej Freimut, Wojciech Kurpiewski, Grzegorz Krawców, and Kazimierz Krzyżański (POL)	3:04.73
6.	Gilbert Schneider, Reiner Scholl, Dirk Joestel, and Thomas Reineck (FRG)	3:05.43
7.	Beniamino Bonomi, Daniele Scarpa, Alessandro Pieri, and Francesco Mandragona (ITA)	3:05.97
8.	Per-Inge Bengtsson, Lars-Erik Moberg, Kalle Sundqvist, and Bengt Andersson (SWE)	3:06.03
9.	Didier Vavasseur, Christophe Petibout, Pierre Lubac, and Daniel Legras (FRA)	3:08.71

Hungary was seventh at the 500 meter mark before coming back to lead in the third 250-meter part of the race.
