= Canoeing at the 1988 Summer Olympics – Men's K-2 500 metres =

The men's K-2 500 metres event was a pairs kayaking event conducted as part of the Canoeing at the 1988 Summer Olympics program.

== Medalists ==
Gold	Silver	Bronze
Ian Ferguson and Paul MacDonald (NZL)	Igor Nagayev and Viktor Denisov (URS)	Attila Ábrahám and Ferenc Csipes (HUN)

== Results ==
=== Heats ===
22 crews were entered into the event on September 26. The top three finishers from each of the heats advanced directly to the semifinals while the remaining teams were relegated to the repechages. One team was disqualified during the heats.

Heat 1
1.	Igor Nagaev and Viktor Denisov (URS)	1:33.20	QS
2.	Kay Bluhm and André Wohllebe (GDR)	1:33.66	QS
3.	Mikko Kolehmainen and Olli Kolehmainen (FIN)	1:35.50	QS
4.	Juan Manuel Sánchez and Fernando Fuentes (ESP)	1:36.17	QR
5.	Bernard Brégeon and Olivier Lasak (FRA)	1:38.05	QR
6.	Alwyn Morris and Hugh Fisher (CAN)	1:39.39	QR
7.	Xue Bing and Ma Fuliang (CHN)	1:41.10	QR
8.	Alan Carey and Patrick Holmes (IRL)	1:42.11	QR
Heat 2
1.	Attila Ábrahám and Ferenc Csipes (HUN)	1:32.83	QS
2.	Daniel Stoian and Angelin Velea (ROU)	1:34.09	QS
3.	Beniamino Bonomi and Daniele Scarpa (ITA)	1:35.00	QS
4.	Pavel Havelka and Jan Boháč (TCH)	1:38.72	QR
5.	Byeon Sang-Su and Yun Gi-Su (KOR)	1:41.80	QR
6.	Melagne Lath and Kouame N'Douba (CIV)	1:47.88	QR
Heat 3
1.	Ian Ferguson and Paul MacDonald (NZL)	1:32.32	QS
2.	Reiner Scholl and Thomas Pfrang (FRG)	1:33.29	QS
3.	Terry Kent and Terry White (USA)	1:34.69	QS
4.	Maciej Freimut and Wojciech Kurpiewski (POL)	1:34.72	QR
5.	Peter Foster and Kelvin Graham (AUS)	1:34.73	QR
6.	Ivan Lawler and Grayson Bourne (GBR)	1:40.06	QR
7.	Gustavo Cirillo and José Luis Marello (ARG)	1:52.42	QR
-	Per-Inge Bengtsson and Kalle Sundqvist (SWE)	DISQ

Sweden's disqualification was not disclosed in the official report.

=== Repechages ===
The 12 crews first raced in two repechages on September 26. The top three finishers from each of the repechages advanced directly to the semifinals.

Repechage 1
1.	Juan Manuel Sánchez and Fernando Fuentes (ESP)	1:40.09	QS
2.	Alan Carey and Patrick Holmes (IRL)	1:41.12	QS
3.	Maciej Freimut and Wojciech Kurpiewski (POL)	1:41.99	QS
4.	Alwyn Morris and Hugh Fisher (CAN)	1:43.03
5.	Byeon Sang-Su and Yun Gi-Su (KOR)	1:44.64
6.	Gustavo Cirillo and José Luis Marello (ARG)	1:46.98
Repechage 2
1.	Peter Foster and Kelvin Graham (AUS)	1:37.28	QS
2.	Bernard Brégeon and Olivier Lasak (FRA)	1:38.71	QS
3.	Ivan Lawler and Grayson Bourne (GBR)	1:39.72	QS
4.	Pavel Havelka and Jan Boháč (TCH)	1:40.76
5.	Xue Bing and Ma Fuliang (CHN)	1:43.17
6.	Melagne Lath and Kouame N'Douba (CIV)	1:55.65

=== Semifinals ===
The top three finishers in each of the semifinals (raced on September 28) advanced to the final.

Semifinal 1
1.	Reiner Scholl and Thomas Pfrang (FRG)	1:32.73	QF
2.	Igor Nagaev and Viktor Denisov (URS)	1:34.46	QF
3.	Beniamino Bonomi and Daniele Scarpa (ITA)	1:34.50	QF
4.	Alwyn Morris and Hugh Fisher (CAN)	1:36.00
5.	Juan Manuel Sánchez and Fernando Fuentes (ESP)	1:36.22
6.	Ivan Lawler and Grayson Bourne (GBR)	1:37.75
Semifinal 2
1.	Attila Ábrahám and Ferenc Csipes (HUN)	1:34.00	QF
2.	Kay Bluhm and André Wohllebe (GDR)	1:35.67	QF
3.	Terry Kent and Terry White (USA)	1:36.33	QF
4.	Bernard Brégeon and Olivier Lasak (FRA)	1:38.31
5.	Pavel Havelka and Jan Boháč (TCH)	1:39.48
6.	Alan Carey and Patrick Holmes (IRL)	1:39.94
Semifinal 3
1.	Ian Ferguson and Paul MacDonald (NZL)	1:33.81	QF
2.	Daniel Stoian and Angelin Velea (ROU)	1:35.04	QF
3.	Maciej Freimut and Wojciech Kurpiewski (POL)	1:35.33	QF
4.	Peter Foster and Kelvin Graham (AUS)	1:35.97
5.	Mikko Kolehmainen and Olli Kolehmainen (FIN)	1:37.76

=== Final ===
The final was held on September 30.

Gold	Ian Ferguson and Paul MacDonald (NZL)	1:33.98
Silver	Igor Nagaev and Viktor Denisov (URS)	1:34.15
Bronze	Attila Ábrahám and Ferenc Csipes (HUN)	1:34.32
4.	Reiner Scholl and Thomas Pfrang (FRG)	1:34.40
5.	Daniel Stoian and Angelin Velea (ROU)	1:35.96
6.	Maciej Freimut and Wojciech Kurpiewski (POL)	1:36.22
7.	Kay Bluhm and André Wohllebe (GDR)	1:36.49
8.	Terry Kent and Terry White (USA)	1:36.62
9.	Beniamino Bonomi and Daniele Scarpa (ITA)	1:37.30
