= Alexander Belov (disambiguation) =

Alexander Belov (1951–1978) was a Soviet basketball player.

Alexander Belov or Aleksandr Belov may also refer to:

- Alexander Belov (sergeant) (1923–1980), Russian Red Army sergeant during World War II
- Aleksandr Belov (ski jumper) (born 1981), Russian ski jumper
- Aleksandr Belov (canoeist) (fl. 1980s), Soviet sprint canoer
- Alexander Potkin, also known as Alexander Belov (born 1976), Russian nationalist politician

== See also ==
- Alexander Beglov
- Alexander Belev
