= Canoeing at the 1964 Summer Olympics – Men's C-2 1000 metres =

The men's C-2 1000 metres event was an open-style, pairs canoeing event conducted as part of the Canoeing at the 1964 Summer Olympics programme on Lake Sagami, Japan.

The preliminary heats were held on 20 October 1964; 12 crews entered and were split into two heats of 6 pairs each. The top three placers in each heat advanced to the final, while the remaining six crews had to compete in a semifinal held the next day. The 3 slowest canoeists were eliminated in the semifinal on 21 October, with the top 3 joining the initial 6 finalists. The final was held on 22 October.

== Medalists ==
Gold	Silver	Bronze
Andrei Khimich and Stepan Oshchepkov (URS)	Jean Boudehen and Michel Chapuis (FRA)	Peer Nielsen and John Sørensen (DEN)

== Results ==
=== Heats ===
The 12 teams first raced in two heats on 20 October. The top three finishers from each of the heats advanced directly to the final and the remaining 6 teams were relegated to the semifinal.

Heat 1
1.	Andrei Khimich and Stepan Oshchepkov (URS)	4:08.05	QF
2.	Jean Boudehen and Michel Chapuis (FRA)	4:10.26	QF
3.	Peer Nielsen and John Sørensen (DEN)	4:11.34	QF
4.	Antal Hajba and Árpád Soltész (HUN)	4:12.54	QS
5.	Miloslav Houzim and Rudolf Pěnkava (TCH)	4:28.81	QS
6.	James O'Rourke, Jr. and Joseph Dronzek (USA)	4:51.65	QS
Heat 2
1.	Klaus Bohle and Detlef Lewe (EUA)	4:12.37	QF
2.	Igor Lipalit and Achim Sidorov (ROU)	4:12.81	QF
3.	Kari Mäkinen and Rudolf Narjanen (FIN)	4:21.41	QF
4.	Andor Elbert and Fred Heese (CAN)	4:23.40	QS
5.	Shunichi Iwamura and Daisaburo Honda (JPN)	4:25.86	QS
6.	Fred Wasmer and Vid Juricskay (AUS)	4:45.23	QS

=== Semifinal ===
The top three finishers in the semifinal (raced on 21 October) advanced to the final, joining the six teams who had moved directly from the heats. All other teams were eliminated.

1.	Antal Hajba and Árpád Soltész (HUN)	4:35.30	QF
2.	Andor Elbert and Fred Heese (CAN)	4:38.18	QF
3.	Miloslav Houzim and Rudolf Pěnkava (TCH)	4:38.79	QF
4.	Shunichi Iwamura and Daisaburo Honda (JPN)	4:40.54
5.	James O'Rourke, Jr. and Joseph Dronzek (USA)	4:51.98
6.	Fred Wasmer and Vid Juricskay (AUS)	5:04.05

=== Final ===
The final was held on 22 October. All three medallists, and even the fourth-place finishers, came from the first heat.

Gold	Andrei Khimich and Stepan Oshchepkov (URS)	4:04.65
Silver	Jean Boudehen and Michel Chapuis (FRA)	4:06.52
Bronze	Peer Nielsen and John Sørensen (DEN)	4:07.48
4.	Antal Hajba and Árpád Soltész (HUN)	4:08.97
5.	Igor Lipalit and Achim Sidorov (ROU)	4:09.88
6.	Klaus Bohle and Detlef Lewe (EUA)	4:13.18
7.	Andor Elbert and Fred Heese (CAN)	4:21.99
8.	Miloslav Houzim and Rudolf Pěnkava (TCH)	4:22.89
9.	Kari Mäkinen and Rudolf Narjanen (FIN)	4:23.02
