= Hristo Georgiev =

Hristo Georgiev may refer to:

- Hristo Georgiev (patron), Bulgarian, funded the construction of Sofia University
- Hristo Georgiev (canoeist), Bulgarian sprint canoer
