= Zsolt Varga =

Zsolt Varga may refer to:

- Zsolt Varga (canoeist), Hungarian canoeist
- Zsolt Varga (water polo, born 1972), Hungarian water polo player (national team (1996/2000/2004 Olympics), RN Savona (2003-04), Canottieri Leonida Bissolati (2004-08), CN Posillipo (2008-))
- Zsolt Varga (water polo, born 1978), Hungarian water polo player (national team (2003 European Champ.), Vasas SC)
