= Canoeing at the 1988 Summer Olympics – Men's K-1 1000 metres =

The men's K-1 1000 metres event was an individual kayaking event conducted as part of the Canoeing at the 1988 Summer Olympics program.

== Medalists ==
Gold	Silver	Bronze
Greg Barton (USA)	Grant Davies (AUS)	André Wohllebe (GDR)

== Results ==
=== Heats ===
The 19 competitors first raced in three heats on September 27. The top three finishers from each of the heats advanced directly to the semifinals. All remaining competitors competed in the repechages later that day.

Heat 1
1.	Greg Barton (USA)	3:42.26	QS
2.	Dmitriy Bankovskiy (URS)	3:43.32	QS
3.	Philippe Boccara (FRA)	3:44.37	QS
4.	José Garcia (POR)	3:44.53	QR
5.	Dirk Ulaszewski (FRG)	3:45.10	QR
6.	José Reyes (ESP)	3:57.92	QR
Heat 2
1.	Ferenc Cspies (HUN)	3:41.87	QS
2.	Morten Ivarsen (NOR)	3:43.10	QS
3.	Grant Davies (AUS)	3:43.52	QS
4.	Patrick Holmes (IRL)	3:52.67	QR
5.	Ivan Lawler (GBR)	3:54.85	QR
6.	Luk Kwok Sun (HKG)	4:27.84	QR
Heat 3
1.	Gunnar Olsson (SWE)	3:41.60	QS
2.	André Wohllebe (GDR)	3:42.07	QS
3.	Attila Szabó (TCH)	3:46.70	QS
4.	Alan Thompson (NZL)	3:48.10	QR
5.	Carl Beaumier (CAN)	4:00.63	QR
6.	Atilio Vásquez (ARG)	4:01.35	QR
7.	Kim Dong-Su (KOR)	4:10.42	QR

=== Repechages ===
Taking place on September 27, two repechages were held. The top three finishers in each repechage advanced to the semifinals.

Repechage 1
1.	José Garcia (POR)	3:51.14	QS
2.	José Reyes (ESP)	3:53.39	QS
3.	Carl Beaumier (CAN)	3:55.27	QS
4.	Atilio Vásquez (ARG)	3:58.03
5.	Ivan Lawler (GBR)	3:59.69
Repechage 2
1.	Alan Thompson (NZL)	3:46.20	QS
2.	Dirk Ulaszewski (FRG)	3:46.46	QS
3.	Patrick Holmes (IRL)	3:46.92	QS
4.	Kim Dong-Su (KOR)	4:05.51
5.	Luk Kwok Sun (HKG)	4:30.20

=== Semifinals ===
Raced on September 29, the top three finishers from each of the three semifinals advanced to the final.

Semifinal 1
1.	Greg Barton (USA)	3:40.96	QF
2.	Morten Ivarsen (NOR)	3:41.86	QF
3.	Attila Szabó (TCH)	3:43.44	QF
4.	José Garcia (POR)	3:44.00
5.	Patrick Holmes (IRL)	3:49.26
Semifinal 2
1.	André Wohllebe (GDR)	3:39.98	QF
2.	Ferenc Cspies (HUN)	3:40.17	QF
3.	Philippe Boccara (FRA)	3:41.01	QF
4.	Alan Thompson (NZL)	3:45.40
5.	Carl Beaumier (CAN)	3:55.58
Semifinal 3
1.	Gunnar Olsson (SWE)	3:38.82	QF
2.	Dmitriy Bankovskiy (URS)	3:42.14	QF
3.	Grant Davies (AUS)	3:42.66	QF
4.	Dirk Ulaszewski (FRG)	3:44.17
5.	José Reyes (ESP)	3:48.35

Boccara had qualified for the final, but withdrew and was replaced by Thompson for reasons not disclosed in the official report.

=== Final ===
The final took place on October 1.

Gold	Greg Barton (USA)	3:55.27
Silver	Grant Davies (AUS)	3:55.28
Bronze	André Wohllebe (GDR)	3:55.55
4.	Dmitriy Bankovskiy (URS)	3:56.49
5.	Gunnar Olsson (SWE)	3:56.84
6.	Alan Thompson (NZL)	3:56.91
7.	Attila Szabó (TCH)	3:57.52
8.	Morten Ivarsen (NOR)	3:59.18
9.	Ferenc Cspies (HUN)	4:00.30
