= Apanavičius =

- Lithuanian surname
- f.: (unmarried): Apanavičiūtė
- f.: (married): Apanavičienė
- Related names: Belarusian: Apanovich; Polish: Apanowicz; Ukrainian: Apanovych; Belarusian: Apanasevich; Ukrainian: Opanasevych, Panasevych; Polish: Apanasiewicz, Opanasiewicz, Panasiewicz

Apanavičius is a Lithuanian-language surname.

- Gražina Apanavičiūtė (1940–2019) Lithuanian opera singer
- Gritė Apanavičiūtė, Lithuanian swimmer
- Romualdas Apanavičius (born 1947), Lithuanian ethnologist
- Vytautas Apanavičius
