= Franaszek =

Franaszek is a surname. Notable people with the surname include:

- Peter Franaszek (born c. 1940), American information theorist
- Tomasz Franaszek (fl. 1989), Polish sprint canoer
