= Heese =

Heese is a Germanic surname. It may refer to:

- Daniel Heese (1867–1901), German Christian missionary in South Africa
- Fred Heese (born 1943), Canadian sprint canoer
- Horst Heese (born 1943), German former professional football player and manager
- Marié Heese (born 1942), South African novelist and teacher
- Mark Heese (born 1969), Canadian beach volleyball player
