= Javier Álvarez =

Javier Álvarez is the name of:

- Javier Álvarez (composer) (1956–2023), Mexican composer
- Javier Álvarez (runner) (born 1943), Spanish long-distance runner
- Javier Álvarez (sprint canoeist) (born 1967), Spanish sprint canoeist
- Javier Álvarez (songwriter) (born 1969), Spanish songwriter
