= Beaumier =

Surname

Beaumier is a surname. Notable people with this surname include:

- Carl Beaumier (born 1966), Canadian sprint canoer
- Colleen Beaumier (born 1944), Canadian politician
- Jo-Anne Beaumier (born 1996), footballer
- Yves Beaumier (1942–2023), Canadian educator and politician
