= USCA =

USCA may refer to:

- Ulster Special Constabulary Association
- United States Canoe Association
- Federal Republic of Central America, also known as the United Provinces of Central America and (inaccurately) the United States of Central America
- United States of Central America, initially the Greater Republic of Central America, a later, short-lived union
- United States Climate Alliance
- United States Code Annotated
- United States Court of Appeals
- United States Croquet Association
- United States Curling Association
- University of South Carolina Aiken
- University Students' Cooperative Association, a student housing cooperative in Berkeley, California, United States
- USCA Foot, a Malagasy football club
