= Andor Elbert =

Canadian canoeist

Personal information
- National team: Canada
- Born: 29 October 1934 Budapest, Hungary
- Died: 27 May 2014 (aged 79) Novato, CA, United States of America
- Height: 183 cm (6 ft 0 in)
- Weight: 79 kg (174 lb)

Sport
- Sport: Canoeing
- Club: Club de Canoë de Course de Lachine, Lachine, Canada
- Former partner: Fred Heese
- Updated on 9/11/2024

Andor Elbert (October 29, 1934 – May 27, 2014) was born in Budapest, Hungary and later immigrated to Canada after the 1956 Hungarian Revolution and became a Canadian sprint canoer who competed in the mid-1960s. He finished seventh in the C-2 1000 m event at the 1964 Summer Olympics in Tokyo. Partner was Fred Heese. He founded Mosomedve Laundromat in Hungary in 2004. He died on 27th May 2014 in Novato, California, USA.
