= John Sorensen =

John Sorensen may refer to:

- John Sørensen, Danish sprint canoeist
- John L. Sorenson, American anthropologist, scholar and author
