= Kyung-seok =

- Hangul: 경석
- RR: Gyeongseok
- MR: Kyŏngsŏk

Kyung-seok, also spelled Kyung-suk or Kyong-sok, is a Korean given name.

People with this name include

- Moon Kyoung-seok (born 1958), stage name Dragon Lee, North Korean-born South Korean martial artist
- Im Gyeong-seok (born 1968), South Korean rower
- Seo Gyeong-seok (born 1970), South Korean sprint canoer
- Kim Kyung-seok (born 1972), South Korean field hockey player
- Seo Kyung-seok (born 1972), South Korean comedian
- Park Kyung-suk (handballer) (born 1981), South Korean handball player
- Ri Kyong-sok (born 1981), North Korean weightlifter

Fictional characters with this name include:

- Do Kyung-seok, the main character of the drama Gangnam Beauty
- Park Gyeong-seok, a character from Squid Game

== See also ==
- List of Korean given names
