= Dirk Ulaszewski =

West German sprint canoer (born 1964)

Dirk Ulaszewski (born 19 March 1964) is a West German sprint canoeist who competed in the late 1980s. At the 1988 Summer Olympics in Seoul, he was eliminated in the semifinals of the K-1 1000 m event.
