= Nadezhda Kovalevich =

Soviet canoeist

Medal record

Women's canoe sprint

World Championships
Bronze medal – third place	1989 Plovdiv	K-2 5000 m
Bronze medal – third place	1989 Plovdiv	K-4 500 m

Nadezhda Kovalevich (born March 8, 1969) is a Soviet sprint canoer who competed in the late 1980s. She won two bronze medals at the 1989 ICF Canoe Sprint World Championships in Plovdiv, earning them in the K-2 5000 m and K-4 500 m events.

Kovalevich also finished fourth in the K-4 500 m event at the 1988 Summer Olympics in Seoul.
