= Joseph Dronzek =

American sprint canoer

Joseph Francis Dronzek (July 14, 1940 – August 9, 2024) was an American sprint canoer who competed at the 1964 Summer Olympics in Tokyo, Japan. He was born in Yonkers, New York. Dronzek was eliminated in the semifinals of the C-2 1000 metres event.
