= Yun Gi-su =

South Korean canoeist

- Hangul: 윤기수
- Hanja: 尹棋洙
- RR: Yun Gisu
- MR: Yun Kisu

Yun Gi-su (born June 19, 1967) is a South Korean sprint canoer who competed in the late 1980s. At the 1988 Summer Olympics in Seoul, paired with Byeon Sang-Su, he was eliminated in the repechages of the Kayak Doubles (K-2) 500 m event.
