= Gennadiy Vassilenko =

Medal record

Men's canoe sprint

World Championships
Bronze medal – third place	1989 Plovdiv	K-2 10000 m

Gennadiy Vassilenko is a Soviet sprint canoer who competed in the late 1980s. He won a bronze medal in the K-2 10000 m event at the 1989 ICF Canoe Sprint World Championships in Plovdiv.
