= Peter Ekström =

Swedish canoeist

Medal record

Men's canoe sprint

World Championships
Silver medal – second place	1985 Mechelen	K-4 10000 m

Peter Ekström is a Swedish sprint canoer who competed in the mid-1980s. He won a silver medal in the K-4 10000 m event at the 1985 ICF Canoe Sprint World Championships in Mechelen.
