= Ivan Marinov (canoeist) =

Bulgarian canoeist

Medal record

Men's canoe sprint

World Championships
Bronze medal – third place	1989 Plovidv	K-4 500 m

Ivan Marinov (Bulgarian: Иван Маринов) (born August 7, 1968) is a Bulgarian sprint canoer who competed in the late 1980s. He won a bronze medal in the K-4 500 m event at the 1989 ICF Canoe Sprint World Championships in Plovdiv.

At the 1988 Summer Olympics in Seoul, Marinov competed in the K-4 1000 m event, but was eliminated in the semifinals.
