= Borislav Tsvetkov =

Bulgarian canoeist (born 1967)

Borislav Bratkov Tsvetkov (Bulgarian: Борислав Братков Цветков) (born July 9, 1967 in Vidin) is a Bulgarian sprint canoer who competed in the late 1980s. He was eliminated in the semifinals of the K-4 1000 m event at the 1988 Summer Olympics in Seoul.
