= Vid Juricskay =

Australian canoeist

Vid Juricskay (born 12 August 1934) is an Australian sprint canoeist who competed in the mid-1960s. He was eliminated in the semifinals of the C-2 1000 m event at the 1964 Summer Olympics in Tokyo.
