= Paul Gilmour =

Australian sprint canoeist (born 1965)

Paul Gilmour (born 10 May 1965) is an Australian sprint canoeist who competed in the late 1980s. He finished fourth in the K-4 1000 m event at the 1988 Summer Olympics in Seoul.
