= Byeon Sang-su =

South Korean canoeist (born 1964)

- Hangul: 변상수
- Hanja: 邊相洙
- RR: Byeon Sangsu
- MR: Pyŏn Sangsu

Byeon Sang-su (born September 8, 1964) is a South Korean sprint canoer who competed in the late 1980s. At the 1988 Summer Olympics in Seoul, paired with Yun Gi-su, he was eliminated in the repechages of the Kayak Doubles (K-2) 500 m event.
