= Fernando Fuentes =

Spanish canoeist

Fernando Fuentes (born 24 September 1966) is a Spanish sprint canoeist who competed in the late 1980s. At the 1988 Summer Olympics in Seoul, he was eliminated in the semifinals of both the K-2 500 m and the K-4 1000 m events.
