= Daniel Stoian =

Romanian sprint canoer (born 1967)

Personal information
- Born: 21 April 1967 (age 59) Bucharest, Romania

Sport
- Sport: Canoe sprint
Medal record
Representing Romania
World Championships
Gold medal – first place	1986 Montreal	K-2 1000 m
Silver medal – second place	1994 Mexico City	K-2 200 m
Silver medal – second place	1995 Duisburg	K-2 200 m
Bronze medal – third place	1986 Montreal	K-2 10000 m
Summer Universiade
Gold medal – first place	1987 Zagreb	K-2 500 m
Silver medal – second place	1987 Zagreb	K-2 1000 m

Daniel Stoian (born 21 April 1967) is a Romanian sprint canoer who competed from the late 1980s to the late 1990s. He won four medals at the ICF Canoe Sprint World Championships with a gold (K-2 1000 m: 1986), two silvers (K-2 200 m: 1994, 1995), and a bronze (K-2 10000 m: 1986).

Stoian also competed in three Summer Olympics, earning his best finish of fifth twice (K-2 500 m: 1988, K-4 1000 m: 1992).
