= Bryan Thomas (canoeist) =

Australian sprint canoeist (born 1961)

Bryan Thomas (born 26 December 1961) is an Australian sprint canoeist who competed in the late 1980s. He finished fourth in the K-4 1000 m event at the 1988 Summer Olympics in Seoul.
