= Rudolf Närjänen =

Finnish canoeist

Rudolf Närjänen (March 31, 1941 – February 26, 2009) was a Finnish sprint canoer who competed in the mid-1960s. He finished ninth in the C-2 1000 m event at the 1964 Summer Olympics in Tokyo.
