= László Vincze (canoeist) =

Hungarian canoeist

Medal record

Men's canoe sprint

World Championships
Silver medal – second place	1989 Plovdiv	K-4 10000 m

László Vincze is a Hungarian sprint canoer who competed in the late 1980s. He won a silver medal in the K-4 10000 m event at the 1989 ICF Canoe Sprint World Championships in Plovdiv.
