= 1989 ICF Canoe Sprint World Championships =

In Plovdiv, Bulgaria

The 1989 ICF Canoe Sprint World Championships were held in Plovdiv, Bulgaria.

The men's competition consisted of eight Canadian (single paddle, open boat) and nine kayak events. Five events were held for the women, all in kayak. Men's C-4 500 m and C-4 1000 m were added along with women's K-1 5000 m and K-2 5000 m.

This was the 22nd championships in canoe sprint.

== Medal summary ==
=== Men's ===
==== Canoe ====
| Event | Gold | Time | Silver | Time | Bronze | Time |
|---|---|---|---|---|---|---|
| C-1 500 m | Michał Śliwiński (URS) | | Olaf Heukrodt (GDR) | | Martin Marinov (BUL) | |
| C-1 1000 m | Ivan Klementiev (URS) | | Larry Cain (CAN) | | Gáspár Boldizsár (HUN) | |
| C-1 10000 m | Ivan Klementiev (URS) | | Zsolt Bohács (HUN) | | Jan Bartůněk (TCH) | |
| C-2 500 m | Soviet Union; Viktor Reneisky; Nicolae Juravschi | | Poland; Tomasz Goliasz; Marek Łbik | | France; Joël Bettin; Philippe Renaud | |
| C-2 1000 m | Denmark; Arne Nielsson; Christian Frederiksen | | France; Olivier Boivin; Didier Hoyer | | Soviet Union; Yuriy Gurin; Valeriy Veshko | |
| C-2 10000 m | Denmark; Arne Nielsson; Christian Frederiksen | | France; Olivier Boivin; Didier Hoyer | | Soviet Union; Andrey Balabanov; Viktor Dobrotvorskiy | |
| C-4 500 m | Soviet Union; Viktor Reneisky; Nicolae Juravschi; Yuriy Gurin; Valeriy Veshko | | Hungary; Attila Szabó; Zsolt Varga; György Zala; Ervin Hoffmann | | France; Benoît Bernard; Joël Bettin; Philippe Renaud; Pascal Sylvoz | |
| C-4 1000 m | Soviet Union; Viktor Reneisky; Nicolae Juravschi; Yuriy Gurin; Valeriy Veshko | | Hungary; Gusztáv Leikep; Attila Szabó; Gábor Takács; Ervin Hoffmann | | Bulgaria; Dejan Bonev; Nikolay Bukhalov; Hristo Georgiev; Paisiy Lubenov | |

==== Kayak ====
| Event | Gold | Time | Silver | Time | Bronze | Time |
|---|---|---|---|---|---|---|
| K-1 500 m | Martin Hunter (AUS) | | Kay Bluhm (GDR) | | Mike Herbert (USA) | |
| K-1 1000 m | Zsolt Gyulay (HUN) | | Torsten Krentz (GDR) | | Kalle Sundqvist (SWE) | |
| K-1 10000 m | Attila Szabó (TCH) | | Stanislav Boreyko (URS) | | José Garcia (POR) | |
| K-2 500 m | East Germany; Kay Bluhm; Torsten Guitsche | | Soviet Union; Sergey Kalesnik; Anatoly Tishchenko | | Poland; Maciej Freimut; Wojciech Kurpiewski | |
| K-2 1000 m | East Germany; Kay Bluhm; Torsten Guitsche | | Soviet Union; Vladimir Bobrezhov; Artūras Vieta | | Hungary; Attilia Andorvicz; Zoltán Berkes | |
| K-2 10000 m | Hungary; Attila Ábrahám; Sándor Hódosi | | Great Britain; Grayson Bourne; Ivan Lawler | | Soviet Union; Vladimir Gordilley; Gennadiy Vassilenko | |
| K-4 500 m | Soviet Union; Viktor Denisov; Sergey Kirsanov; Aleksandr Motuzenko; Viktor Pusev | | West Germany; Volker Kreutzer; Thomas Pfrang; Reiner Scholl; Mario von Appen | | Bulgaria; Andrian Dushev; Petar Godev; Nikolay Jordanov; Ivan Marinov | |
| K-4 1000 m | Hungary; Ferenc Cspies; Attila Ábrahám; Zsolt Gyulay; Sándor Hódosi | | Poland; Robert Chwiałkowski; Maciej Freimut; Grzegorz Krawców; Wojciech Kurpiewski | | East Germany; Guido Behling; Torsten Krentz; Thomas Vaske; André Wohllebe | |
| K-4 10000 m | Soviet Union; Vladimir Bobreshov; Aleksandr Myzgin; Sergey Superata; Artūras Vieta | | Hungary; Gábor Kulcsár; Ákos Angyal; Ferenc Csipes; László Vincze | | Poland; Andrzej Gajewski; Tomasz Franaszek; Grzegorz Kaleta; Mariusz Rutkowski | |

=== Women's ===
==== Kayak ====
| Event | Gold | Time | Silver | Time | Bronze | Time |
|---|---|---|---|---|---|---|
| K-1 500 m | Katrin Borchert (GDR) | | Izabela Dylewska (POL) | | Josefa Idem (FRG) | |
| K-1 5000 m | Katrin Borchert (GDR) | | Izabela Dylewska (POL) | | Josefa Idem (FRG) | |
| K-2 500 m | East Germany; Anke Nothnagel; Heike Singer | | Hungary; Éva Dónusz; Erika Mészáros | | Soviet Union; Irina Salomykova; Galina Savenko | |
| K-2 5000 m | East Germany; Monika Bunke; Ramona Portwich | | Romania; Marina Bituleanu; Lumineta Hertea | | Soviet Union; Aleksandra Apanovich; Nadezhda Kovalevich | |
| K-4 500 m | East Germany; Katrin Borchert; Monika Bunke; Heike Singer; Anke Nothnagel | | Hungary; Katalin Gyulai; Henirette Huber; Rita Kőbán; Erika Mészáros | | Soviet Union; Aleksandra Apanovich; Nadezhda Kovalevich; Irina Salomykova; Galina Savenko | |

== Medals table ==
| Rank | Nation | Gold | Silver | Bronze | Total |
|---|---|---|---|---|---|
| 1 | Soviet Union (URS) | 8 | 3 | 5 | 16 |
| 2 | East Germany (GDR) | 7 | 3 | 1 | 11 |
| 3 | Hungary (HUN) | 3 | 6 | 2 | 11 |
| 4 | Denmark (DEN) | 2 | 0 | 0 | 2 |
| 5 | Czechoslovakia (TCH) | 1 | 0 | 1 | 2 |
| 6 | Australia (AUS) | 1 | 0 | 0 | 1 |
| 7 | Poland (POL) | 0 | 4 | 2 | 6 |
| 8 | France (FRA) | 0 | 2 | 2 | 4 |
| 9 | West Germany (FRG) | 0 | 1 | 2 | 3 |
| 10 | Great Britain (GBR) | 0 | 1 | 1 | 2 |
| 11 | Canada (CAN) | 0 | 1 | 0 | 1 |
| 11 | Romania (ROU) | 0 | 1 | 0 | 1 |
| 13 | Bulgaria (BUL) | 0 | 0 | 3 | 3 |
| 14 | Portugal (POR) | 0 | 0 | 1 | 1 |
| 14 | Sweden (SWE) | 0 | 0 | 1 | 1 |
| 14 | United States (USA) | 0 | 0 | 1 | 1 |
| Totals (16 entries) | | 22 | 22 | 22 | 66 |
