= Adrian Collier =

British sprint canoer (born 1965)

Adrian Collier (born 1 November 1965) is a British canoe sprinter who competed in the late 1980s. He was eliminated in the repechages of the K-4 1000 m event at the 1988 Summer Olympics in Seoul.
