= Attila Lipták =

Hungarian sprint canoer

Medal record

Men's canoe sprint

World Championships
Bronze medal – third place	1985 Mechelen	C-1 10000 m

Attila Lipták is a Hungarian sprint canoer who competed in the mid-1980s. He won a bronze medal in the C-1 10000 m at the 1985 ICF Canoe Sprint World Championships in Mechelen.
