= Marina Bituleanu =

Romanian sprint canoer

Medal record

Women's canoe sprint

World Championships
Silver medal – second place	1989 Plovdiv	K-2 5000 m

Marina Bituleanu is a Romanian sprint canoer who competed in the late 1980s. She won a silver medal in the K-2 5000 m event at the 1989 ICF Canoe Sprint World Championships in Plovdiv.
