= Antal Hajba =

Hungarian canoeist (1938–2017)

- Born: 16 January 1938; Hungary
Died
5 March 2017 (aged 79)
Antal Hajba
Medal record
Men's canoe sprint
World Championships
Gold medal – first place	1966 East Berlin	C-1 10000 m

Antal Hajba (16 January 1938 – 5 March 2017) was a Hungarian sprint canoeist who competed in the mid-1960s. He won the gold medal in the C-1 10000 m event at the 1966 ICF Canoe Sprint World Championships in East Berlin.

Paired alongside Árpád Soltész, Hajba finished fourth in the C-2 1000 m event at the 1964 Summer Olympics in Tokyo.
