= Patrick Holmes =

Irish sprint canoer

Patrick Holmes (born 30 March 1966) is an Irish canoe sprinter who competed in the late 1980s and early 1990s. At the 1988 Summer Olympics in Seoul, he was eliminated in the semifinals of both the K-1 1000 m and K-2 500 m events. Four years later in Barcelona, Holmes was eliminated in the semifinals of both the K-1 500 m and the K-1 1000 m events.
