= Daisaburo Honda =

Japanese canoeist

Daisaburo Honda (本田 大三郎, Honda Daisaburō; born February 17, 1935) is a Japanese sprint canoer who competed in the mid-1960s. He was eliminated in the semifinals of the C-2 1000 m event at the 1964 Summer Olympics in Tokyo. His son is Olympian wrestler and retired pro wrestler Tamon Honda and his great-nephew is footballer Keisuke Honda.
