= Canoeing at the 1987 Pan American Games – Men's K-1 1000 metres =

Men's K-1 1000 metres at the 1987 Pan American Games
- Venue: Eagle Creek Park
- Dates: 9 August
- Competitors: 7 from 7 nations
- Winning time: 3.47.26

Medalists
| Gold medal | Greg Barton | United States |
| Silver medal | Jorge García | Cuba |
| Bronze medal | Atilio Vásquez | Argentina |

The men's K-1 1000 metres canoeing event at the 1987 Pan American Games was held at the Eagle Creek Park in Indianapolis.

== Results ==
=== Final ===
| Rank | Athletes | Country | Time | Notes |
|---|---|---|---|---|
| 1st place, gold medalist(s) | Greg Barton | United States | 3.47.26 | |
| 2nd place, silver medalist(s) | Jorge García | Cuba | 4.06.03 | |
| 3rd place, bronze medalist(s) | Atilio Vásquez | Argentina | 4.08.91 | |
| 4 | Tom Ladanyi | Canada | 4.14.80 | |
| 5 | Felipe Romero | Mexico | 4.43.07 | |
| 6 | Jesús Spagnolo | Uruguay | 5.04.11 | |
| 7 | Fernando Castañeda | Costa Rica | 5.27.10 | |
