= Heiko Zinke =

East German Sprint canoeist

Medal record

Men's canoe sprint

World Championships
Gold medal – first place	1985 Mechelen	K-4 500 m
Silver medal – second place	1985 Mechelen	K-1 1000 m
Bronze medal – third place	1985 Mechelen	K-4 1000 m

Heiko Zinke is an East German sprint canoeist who competed in the mid-1980s. At the 1985 ICF Canoe Sprint World Championships in Mechelen, Belgium, he won a complete set of medals with a gold in K-4 500 m, a silver in K-1 1000 m, and a bronze in the K-4 1000 m events.
