= Henrik Christiansen (canoeist) =

Danish sprint canoer

Medal record

Men's canoe sprint

World Championships
Bronze medal – third place	1985 Mechelen	K-4 10000 m

Henrik Christiansen is a Danish sprint canoer who competed in the mid-1980s. He won a bronze medal in the K-4 10000 m event at the 1985 ICF Canoe Sprint World Championships in Mechelen.
