= Lee Yong-chul =

South Korean canoeist

Personal information
- Born: January 4, 1970 (age 56)
- Height: 181 cm (5 ft 11 in)
- Weight: 80 kg (176 lb)
Medal record
Men's canoe sprint
Representing South Korea
Asian Games
Silver medal – second place	1990 Beijing	K-1 500 m

- Lee Yong-chul
- Hangul: 이용철
- Hanja: 李容喆
- RR: I Yongcheol
- MR: I Yongch'ŏl

Lee Yong-chul (이용철, born January 4, 1970) is a South Korean sprint canoer who competed in the late 1980s and early 1990s. At the 1988 Summer Olympics in Seoul, he was eliminated in the repechages of the K-4 1000 m event. Four years later in Barcelona, Lee was eliminated in the first round of the same event.
