= Apanowicz =

Apanowicz is a unisex Polish-language surname.

- Kathryn Apanowicz (1960–2025), British actress and presenter
- Magda Apanowicz (born 1985), Canadian actress

== See also ==
- Apanavičius; lists several variants in other languages
