= Gilbert Schneider =

German canoeist (born 1965)

Medal record

Men's canoe sprint

World Championships
| Bronze medal – third place | 1986 Montreal | K-4 500 m |
| Bronze medal – third place | 1987 Duisburg | K-4 10000 m |

Gilbert Schneider (born 4 January 1965 in Troisdorf) is a West German sprint canoer who competed in the late 1980s. He won two bronze medals at the ICF Canoe Sprint World Championships, earning them in 1986 (K-4 500 m) and a 1987 (K-4 10000 m).

Schneider also finished sixth in the K-4 1000 m event at the 1988 Summer Olympics in Seoul.
