= Rudolf Pěnkava =

Czechoslovak sprint canoeist (born 1945)

Medal record

Men's canoe sprint

World Championships
Silver medal – second place	1966 East Berlin	C-1 10000 m

Rudolf Pěnkava (born November 21, 1945) is a Czechoslovak sprint canoeist who competed in the mid to late 1960s. He won the silver medal in the C-1 10000 m event at the 1966 ICF Canoe Sprint World Championships in East Berlin.

Pěnkava also competed in two Summer Olympics, earning his best finish of eighth in the C-2 1000 m event at Tokyo in 1964.
