= Matei Kalpakov =

Bulgarian sprint canoer

Medal record

Men's canoe sprint

World Championships
Bronze medal – third place	1985 Mechelen	C-2 10000 m

Matei Kalpakov is a Bulgarian sprint canoer who competed in the mid-1980s. He won a bronze medal in the C-2 10000 m event at the 1985 ICF Canoe Sprint World Championships in Mechelen.
