= Robin Ayres =

British sprint canoeist (born 1961)

Robin Anthony Ayres (born 5 May 1961) is a British sprint canoeist who competed in the late 1980s. He was eliminated in the repechages of the K-4 1000 m event at the 1988 Summer Olympics in Seoul.
