= Thomas Pfrang =

Medal record

Men's canoe sprint

World Championships
Gold medal – first place	1986 Montreal	K-2 500 m
Silver medal – second place	1989 Plovdiv	K-4 500 m
Bronze medal – third place	1987 Duisburg	K-4 500 m

Thomas Pfrang (born 11 December 1964) is a West German sprint canoeist who competed in the late 1980s. He won a complete set of medals at the ICF Canoe Sprint World Championships with a gold (K-2 500 m: 1986), a silver (K-4 500 m: 1989), and a bronze (K-4 500 m: 1987).

Pfrang also finished fourth in the K-2 500 m event at the 1988 Summer Olympics in Seoul. OWNER OF THE "SILBERNE LORBEERBLATT"
