= United States Canoe Association =

American canoe and paddle sport organization

The United States Canoe Association (USCA) is a 501(c)(3) non-profit organization devoted to canoeing and paddle sports within the United States. Established in 1968, it is headquartered in Lafayette, Indiana.

USCA promotes and encourages the growth of paddling as a recognized competitive sport and beneficial recreational activity through educational and competitive programs.

== Programs ==
The USCA sanctions programs and events to promote paddlesport competition including its two marquee annual events; USCA National Canoe & Kayak Championship and the USCA Stock Aluminum & K-1 Downriver/Touring Championship. In January 2023, USCA announced that Warren County, PA would host the 2024 championship event.

=== Youth Cup ===
The USCA sponsors a youth cup named after one of its members Greg Barton. Barton won four canoeing medals at the Summer Olympics, including golds in the K-1 1000 m and K-2 1000 m events at the 1988 Summer Olympics in Seoul. He also won several medals at the ICF Canoe Sprint World Championships.

== Publications ==
The Association publishes a quarterly magazine, Canoe News, devoted to competition, recreational cruising and camping, water safety, construction and maintenance of equipment, and canoeing news in general. The organization claims it is the only magazine that focuses solely on marathon canoe and kayak racing. USCA also publishes a canoe safety brochure and a training safety video under the approval of the U.S. Coast Guard.

== Championship locations ==
The Association selects a location for the championships each year. They have been held every year since 1968 except for 2020 due to Covid restrictions.

Year	Location
1968	Cumberland River, Oneida, Tennessee
1969	Wabash, Indianadiana
1970	Springfield, Ohioio
1971	Oscoda, Michigan
1972	Oil City, Pennsylvania
1973	Menominee River, Massachusettsrinette, Wisconsin
1974	Waco, Texas
1975	Constantine, Michigan
1976	Little Miami River, Michiganlford, Ohio
1977	Susquehanna River, Owego, New York
1978	Fox River, St. Charles, Illinois
1979	Wisconsin River, Muscoda, Wisconsin
1980	Wabash, Indiana
1981	Lafayette, Indiana
1982	Oswego River, Fulton, New York
1983	Current River, Doniphan, Missouri
1984	Flint, Michigan
1985	Wabash River, Lafayette, Indiana
1986	Barren River, Bowling Green, Kentucky
1987	Jersey Shore, Pennsylvania
1988	Connecticut River, Hanover, New Hampshire
1989	Marinette, Wisconsin
1990	Susquehanna River, Owego, New York
1991	Marinette, Wisconsin
1992	Lewistown, Pennsylvania
1993	Jersey Shore, Pennsylvania
1994	Columbus, Ohio
1995	Syracuse, New York
1996	Oregon, Illinois
1997	Niles, Michigan
1998	Jersey Shore, Pennsylvania
1999	Niles, Michigan
2000	Lafayette, Indiana
2001	Gainesville, Georgia
2002	Hanover, New Hampshire
2003	Warren, Pennsylvania
2004	Oscoda, Michigan
2005	Warren, Pennsylvania
2006	Peshtigo, Wisconsin
2007	Warren, Pennsylvania
2008	Bristol, Indiana
2009	Warren, Pennsylvania
2010	Peshtigo, Wisconsin
2011	Newaygo, Michigan
2012	Warren, Pennsylvania
2013	Newaygo, Michigan
2014	Lock Haven, Pennsylvania
2015	Warren, Pennsylvania
2016	Connecticut River, Northfield, Massachusetts
2017	Mississippi River, Dubuque, Iowa
2018	Seneca River, Syracuse, New York
2019	Allegheny River, Warren, Pennsylvania
2020	Muskegon River / Croton Dam Pond, Newaygo, Michigan; Cancelled due to COVID-19 Pandemic
2021	Allegheny River, Warren, Pennsylvania; Moved from Lock Haven, Pennsylvania
2022	Muskegon River, Newaygo, Michigan
2023	W. Branch Susquehanna River, Lock Haven, Pennsylvania
2024	Allegheny River, Warren, Pennsylvania
