= Dmitry Bankovsky =

Soviet sprint canoer (born 1968)

Medal record

Men's canoe sprint

Representing Soviet Union

World Championships
Gold medal – first place	1990 Poznań	K-4 10000 m

Dmitry Anatolievich Bankovsky (Russian: Дми́трий Анато́льевич Банько́вский; born January 10, 1968, in Svietlahorsk, Byelorussian SSR) is a Soviet sprint canoer who competed in the late 1980s and early 1990s. He won a gold medal in the K-4 10000 m event at the 1990 ICF Canoe Sprint World Championships in Poznań.

Bankovsky also finished fourth in the K-1 1000 m event at the 1988 Summer Olympics in Seoul.
