= Kim Dong-soo (canoeist) =

South Korean canoeist

Personal information
- Born: February 28, 1969 (age 57)
- Height: 179 cm (5 ft 10 in)
- Weight: 76 kg (168 lb)
Medal record
Men's canoe sprint
Representing South Korea
Asian Games
Silver medal – second place	1990 Beijing	K-4 1000 m
Bronze medal – third place	1990 Beijing	K-4 500 m

Kim Dong-soo (김동수, born February 28, 1969) is a South Korean sprint canoer who competed in the late 1980s. At the 1988 Summer Olympics in Seoul, he was eliminated in the repechages of both the K-1 1000 m and the K-4 1000 m events.
