= Mikael Berger =

Swedish sprint canoer

Medal record

Men's canoe sprint

World Championships
Gold medal – first place	1985 Mechelen	K-2 10000 m

Mikael Berger is a Swedish sprint canoer who competed in the mid-1980s. He won a gold medal in the K-2 10000 m event at the 1985 ICF Canoe Sprint World Championships in Mechelen.

He has two siblings, a younger sister called Pernilla and a younger brother called Johan.
