= Pavel Havelka =

Czechoslovak sprint canoer (born 1965)

Pavel Havelka (born 1 July 1965 in Prague) is a Czechoslovak sprint canoer who competed in the late 1980s. At the 1988 Summer Olympics in Seoul, he was eliminated in the semifinals of the K-2 500 m event.
