= Yun Yeong-dae =

South Korean canoeist

- Hangul: 윤영대
- Hanja: 尹永大
- RR: Yun Yeongdae
- MR: Yun Yŏngdae

Yun Yeong-dae (born April 5, 1967) is a South Korean sprint canoer who competed in the late 1980s. At the 1988 Summer Olympics in Seoul, he was eliminated in the repechages of the K-4 1000 m event.
