= Klaus Bohle =

German canoeist (born 1936)

Klaus Böhle (born 14 January 1936 in Herne, North Rhine-Westphalia) is a German sprint canoer who competed in the mid-1960s. He finished sixth in the C-2 1000 m event at the 1964 Summer Olympics in Tokyo.
