= Olivier Lasak =

French canoeist

Olivier Lasak (born 28 March 1967 in Béthune) is a French sprint canoeist who competed in the late 1980s and early 1990s. At the 1988 Summer Olympics in Seoul, he was eliminated in the semifinals of the K-2 500 m event. Four years later, Lasak was eliminated in the semifinals of the same event.
