= Brent Clode =

New Zealand canoeist (born 1963)

Brent Clode (born 21 April 1963) is a New Zealand canoe sprinter who competed in the late 1980s. He was eliminated in the semifinals of the K-4 1000 m event at the 1988 Summer Olympics in Seoul.
