= Miloslav Houzim =

Czechoslovak sprint canoer (born 1941)

Miroslav Houzim (29 June 1941 – 30 June 2005) was a Czechoslovak sprint canoer who competed in the mid-1960s. He finished eighth in the C-2 1000 m event at the 1964 Summer Olympics in Tokyo.
