= Grzegorz Krawców =

Polish canoeist

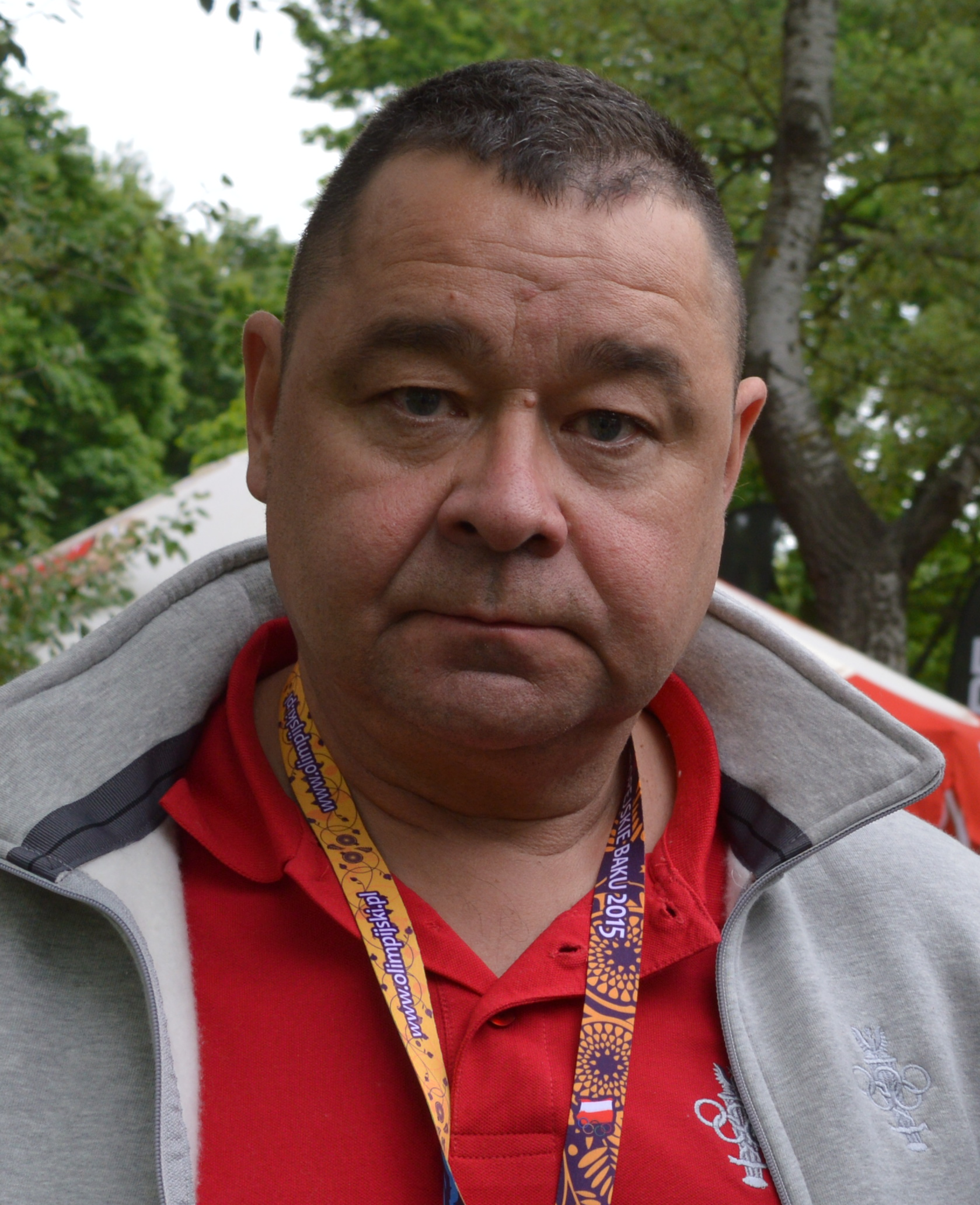

Personal information
- Born: 25 July 1962 (age 64) Nowa Sól, Poland

Sport
- Sport: Canoe sprint
Medal record
Representing Poland
World Championships
Silver medal – second place	1987 Duisburg	K-4 500 m
Silver medal – second place	1989 Plovdiv	K-4 1000 m
Bronze medal – third place	1986 Montreal	K-4 1000 m
Summer Universiade
Gold medal – first place	1987 Zagreb	K-4 500 m
Silver medal – second place	1987 Zagreb	K-4 1000 m

Grzegorz Krawców (born 25 July 1962) is a Polish sprint canoer who competed in the late 1980s and early 1990s. He won three medals at the ICF Canoe Sprint World Championships with two silvers (K-4 500 m: 1987, K-4 1000 m: 1989) and a bronze (K-4 1000 m: 1986).

Krawców also competed in two Summer Olympics, earning his best finish of fifth in the K-4 1000 m event at Seoul in 1988.
