= José Reyes (canoeist) =

Spanish canoeist (born 1962)

José Reyes Rodríguez Rodríguez (born 5 January 1962) is a Spanish sprint canoer who competed in the late 1980s. At the 1988 Summer Olympics in Seoul, he was eliminated in the semifinals of the K-1 1000 m event.
