= Shunichi Iwamura =

Japanese canoeist (born 1940)

Shunichi Iwamura (岩村 俊一, Iwamura Shun'ichi; born October 23, 1940) is a Japanese sprint canoer who competed in the mid-1960s. He was eliminated in the semifinals of the C-2 1000 m event at the 1964 Summer Olympics in Tokyo.
