= Arne Johan Almeland =

Norwegian sprint canoer (born 1965)

Medal record

Men's canoe sprint

World Championships
Gold medal – first place	1987 Duisburg	K-4 10000 m

Arne Johan Almeland (born 19 February 1965) is a Norwegian sprint canoer who competed in the late 1980s. He won a gold medal in the K-4 10000 m event at the 1987 ICF Canoe Sprint World Championships in Duisburg.

Alemland also competed in the K-4 1000 m event at the 1988 Summer Olympics in Seoul, but did not finish their semifinal round.
