= Alessandro Pieri =

Italian canoeist (born 1963)

Personal information
- Born: October 29, 1963 (age 62) Gorizia, Italy

Sport
- Sport: Canoe sprint
Medal record
Representing Italy
Summer Universiade
Silver medal – second place	1987 Zagreb	K-1 1000 m

Alessandro Pieri (born October 29, 1963) is an Italian sprint canoer who competed in the late 1980s. At the 1988 Summer Olympics in Seoul, he finished seventh in the K-4 1000 m event while being eliminated in the semifinals of the K-2 1000 m event.
