= Kari Mäkinen (canoeist) =

Finnish sprint canoer (born 1945)

Kari Mäkinen (born 30 August 1945 in Tampere) is a Finnish sprint canoeist who competed in the mid-1960s. He finished ninth in the C-2 1000 m event at the 1964 Summer Olympics in Tokyo.
