= Francesco Mandragona =

Italian canoeist

Francesco Mandragona (born 27 September 1962) is an Italian sprint canoer who competed in the mid to late 1980s. Competing in two Summer Olympics, he earned his best finish of seventh in the K-4 1000 m event at Seoul in 1988.
