= Carl Beaumier =

Canadian canoeist (born 1966)

Carl Beaumier (born August 23, 1966) is a Canadian sprint canoer who competed in the 1980s. At the 1988 Summer Olympics in Seoul, he was eliminated in the semifinals of the K-1 1000 m event.
