= Andrey Khimich =

Medal record

Men's canoe sprint

Representing the Soviet Union

Olympic Games
Gold medal – first place	1964 Tokyo	C-2 1000 m

World Championships
Silver medal – second place	1966 East Berlin	C-2 10000 m

Andrey Ivanovich Khimich (Russian: Андрей Иванович Химич; born 14 December 1937 in Makiivka, Varva Raion, Chernihiv Oblast) is a Soviet-born Ukraianian sprint canoer who competed in the early 1960s. At the 1964 Summer Olympics in Tokyo, he won the gold in the C-2 1000 m event. Khimich also won a silver medal in the C-2 10000 m event at the 1966 ICF Canoe Sprint World Championships in East Berlin.

He is finished the Cherkasy State Teacher-Training Institute (now Cherkasy National University) in 1959.
