= Alexander Belov (sergeant) =

Hero of the Soviet Union

Alexander Fyodorovich Belov
- Александр Фёдорович Белов
- Born: 30 November 1923; Dushilovo village, Furmanovsky District, Ivanovo Oblast, Soviet Union
- Died: 5 April 1980 (aged 56); Furmanov, Ivanovo Oblast, Soviet Union
- Military career
- Allegiance: Soviet Union
- Branch: Red Army
- Service years: 1942–1945
- Rank: Senior Sergeant
- Unit: 63rd Rifle Division
- Conflicts: World War II; Eastern Front
- Awards: Hero of the Soviet Union; Order of Lenin; Order of the Patriotic War, 2nd class Order of Glory, 3rd class

Alexander Fyodorovich Belov (Russian: Александр Фёдорович Белов; 30 November 1923 – 5 April 1980) was a Red Army Sergeant during World War II and a Hero of the Soviet Union. Drafted into the Red Army, Belov fought in combat from 1942 and was awarded the title for raising a red flag on the East Prussia border. Postwar, he worked as a driver after being demobilized.

== Early life ==
Belov was born on 30 November 1923 in the village of Dushilovo, Ivanovo Oblast to a peasant family. After graduating from primary school, he worked as a drill operator at the casting and mechanical plant in Furmanov.

== World War II ==
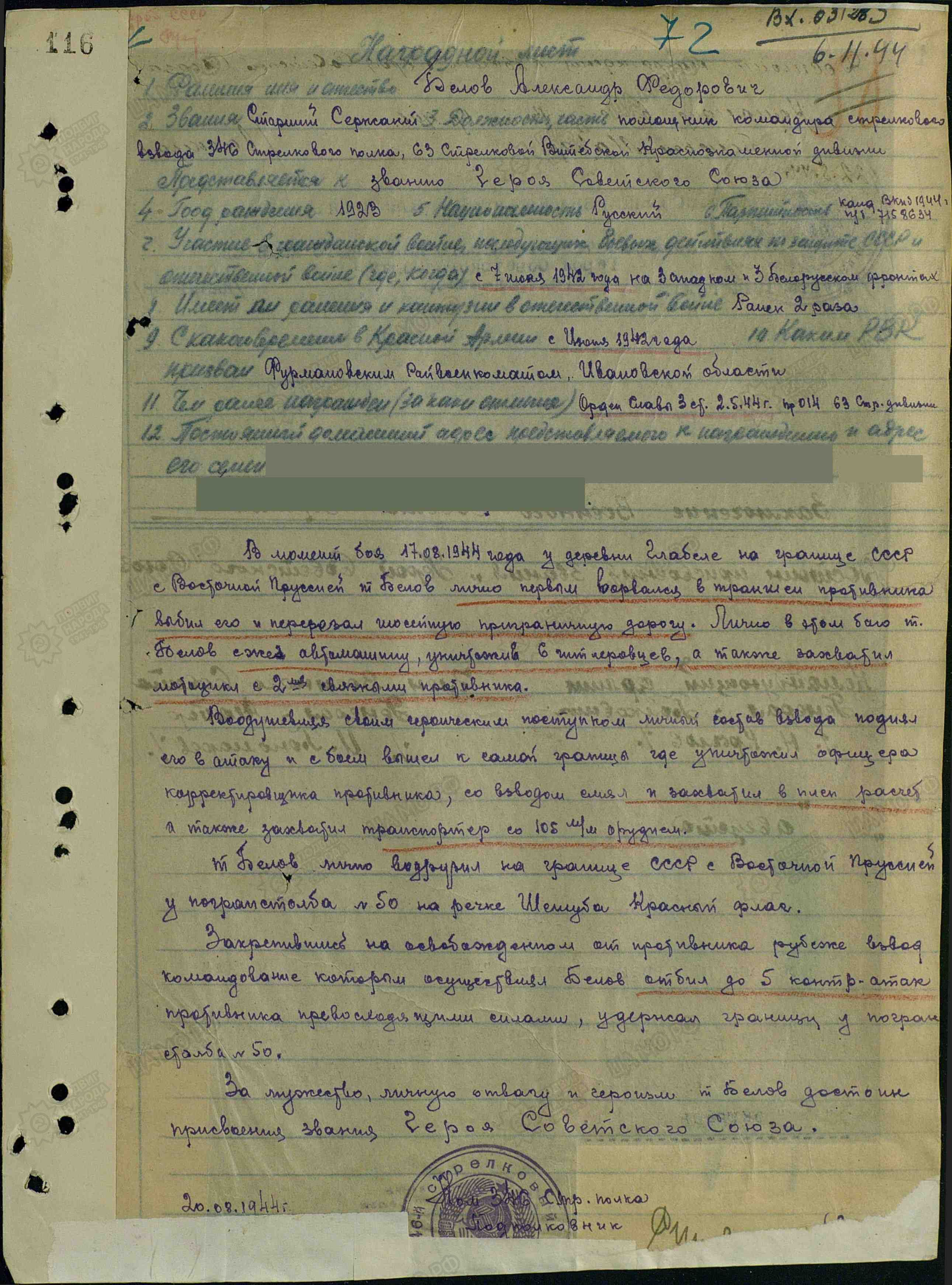
Hero of the Soviet Union citation written by his regimental commander

Belov was drafted into the Red Army during World War II in 1942. Late that year he saw his first combat at Rzhev, going on to fight in the Battle of Smolensk in 1943 and Operation Bagration in 1944. He participated in the capture of Orsha, Vitebsk, Kaunas, and the crossing of the Neman during the latter. At Orsha, after a machine gun broke down, Belov and several other soldiers rolled out a cannon and used it against German troops in direct fire mode. In another battle, he was reported to have been wounded in the head by a splinter, but did not leave the battlefield. He received the Order of Glory, 3rd class for his actions on 2 May, while a sergeant leading a squad of the 1st Battalion, 346th Rifle Regiment in the 63rd Rifle Division. For his actions between 15 and 19 July during Operation Bagration, Belov was awarded the Order of the Patriotic War, 2nd class, on 22 August; by this time he had become an assistant platoon commander and been promoted to senior sergeant.

After the crossing of the Neman, his unit advanced to the border of East Prussia. On 17 August, Belov was reported to have distinguished himself by capturing a trench with a group of soldiers and personally killing six German soldiers. He was reported to have raised a red flag on the Šešupė river on the former location of a Soviet border marker. There, the platoon was reported to have held the position after the repulse of five counterattacks. For his actions, Belov was awarded the title Hero of the Soviet Union and the Order of Lenin on 24 March 1945. Belov became a member of the Communist Party of the Soviet Union in late 1944.

== Postwar ==
Belov was demobilized in 1945 and returned to Furmanov, where he worked as a driver in the rail industry. He did not receive his Gold Star and Order of Lenin at the Kremlin until March 1947. Belov died on 5 April 1980 and was buried in the military section of the Furmanov cemetery.

A street in Furmanov was named for him and a plaque was placed on the house where he lived.
