= Jean Boudehen =

French canoeist

Olympic medal record

Men's canoe sprint
Silver medal – second place	1964 Tokyo	C-2 1000 m

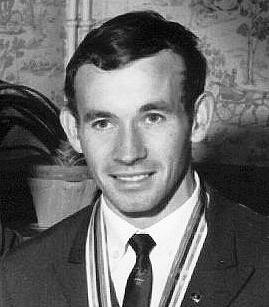
Jean Boudehen in 1964

Jean Boudehen (January 11, 1939 – September 4, 1982) was a French sprint canoer who competed in the 1960s. Competing in two Summer Olympics, he won the silver medal in the C-2 1000 m event at Tokyo in 1964.
