= 1985 ICF Canoe Sprint World Championships =

International canoe competition

The 1985 ICF Canoe Sprint World Championships were held in Mechelen, Belgium.

The men's competition consisted of six canoe (single paddle, open boat) and nine kayak events. Three events were held for the women, all in kayak.

This was the nineteenth championships in canoe sprint.

== Medal summary ==
=== Men's ===
==== Canoe ====
Event	Gold	Time	Silver	Time	Bronze	Time
C-1 500 m	Olaf Heukrodt (GDR)		Anatoliy Volkov (URS)		Aurel Macarencu (ROU)	
C-1 1000 m	Ivan Klementiev (URS)		Ulrich Eicke (FRG)		Aurel Macarencu (ROU)	
C-1 10000 m	Jiří Vrdlovec (TCH)		Takhir Kamaletdinov (URS)		Attila Lipták (HUN)	
C-2 500 m	Hungary; János Sarusi Kis; István Vaskuti		Poland; Marek Łbik; Marek Dopierała		East Germany; Ulrich Papke; Uwe Madeja	
C-2 1000 m	East Germany; Olaf Heukrodt; Alexander Schuck		Yugoslavia; Matija Ljubek; Mirko Nišović		Poland; Marek Łbik; Marek Dopierała	
C-2 10000 m	Yugoslavia; Matija Ljubek; Mirko Nišović		Great Britain; Andrew Train; Stephen Train		Bulgaria; Matei Kalpakov; Tosho Kalpakov	

==== Kayak ====
Event	Gold	Time	Silver	Time	Bronze	Time
K-1 500 m	Andreas Stähle (GDR)		Oliver Seack (FRG)		Bernard Brégeon (FRA)	
K-1 1000 m	Ferenc Csipes (HUN)		Heiko Zeinke (GDR)		Kalle Sundqvist (SWE)	
K-1 10000 m	Greg Barton (USA)		László Nieberl (HUN)		Grant Bramwell (NZL)	
K-2 500 m	New Zealand; Ian Ferguson; Paul MacDonald		East Germany; Guido Behling; Hans-Jörg Bliesener		Soviet Union; Viktor Pusev; Sergey Superata	
K-2 1000 m	France; Pascal Boucherit; Philippe Boccara		Soviet Union; Viktor Pusev; Sergey Superata		Canada; Don Brien; Colin Shaw	
K-2 10000 m	Sweden; Mikael Berger; Conny Edholm		Hungary; István Szabó; István Tóth		Italy; Francesco Uberti; Daniele Scarpa	
K-4 500 m	East Germany; André Wohllebe; Frank Fischer; Peter Hempel; Heiko Zinke		Soviet Union; Aleksandr Belov; Igor Gaidamaka; Viktor Denisov; Aleksandr Vodovatov		Sweden; Karl-Axel Sundqvist; Per-Inge Bengtsson; Lars-Erik Moberg; Per Lundh	
K-4 1000 m	Sweden; Per-Inge Bengtsson; Lars-Erik Moberg; Karl-Axel Sundqvist; Bengt Andersson		Soviet Union; Aleksandr Myzgin; Igor Gaidamaka; Artūras Vieta; Aleksandr Vodovatov		East Germany; André Wohllebe; Frank Fischer; Peter Hempel; Heiko Zinke	
K-4 10000 m	Hungary; Zoltán Böjti; Tibor Helyi; Zoltán Kovács; Kálmán Petrovics		Sweden; Tommy Karls; Bengt Andersson; Peter Ekström; Torbjörn Thoresson		Denmark; Brian Kragh; Thor Nielsen; Lars Koch; Henrik Christiansen	

=== Women's ===
==== Kayak ====
Event	Gold	Time	Silver	Time	Bronze	Time
K-1 500 m	Birgit Schmidt-Fischer (GDR)		Nelli Yefremova (URS)		Agneta Andersson (SWE)	
K-2 500 m	East Germany; Birgit Fischer; Carsta Kühn		Hungary; Éva Rakusz; Rita Kőbán		Netherlands; Annemiek Derckx; Annemarie Cox	
K-4 500 m	East Germany; Birgit Fischer; Carsta Kühn; Heike Singer; Kathrin Giese		Soviet Union; Yelena Dudina; Nelli Yefremova; Irina Salomykova; Guinara Zharafutdinova		Hungary; Katalin Gyulai; Erika Géczi; Éva Rakusz; Rita Kőbán	

== Medals table ==
Rank	Nation	Gold	Silver	Bronze	Total
1	East Germany (GDR)	7	2	2	11
2	Hungary (HUN)	3	3	2	8
3	Sweden (SWE)	2	1	3	6
4	Soviet Union (URS)	1	7	1	9
5	Yugoslavia (YUG)	1	1	0	2
6	France (FRA)	1	0	1	2
6	New Zealand (NZL)	1	0	1	2
8	Czechoslovakia (TCH)	1	0	0	1
8	United States (USA)	1	0	0	1
10	West Germany (FRG)	0	2	0	2
11	Poland (POL)	0	1	1	2
12	Great Britain (GBR)	0	1	0	1
13	Romania (ROU)	0	0	2	2
14	Bulgaria (BUL)	0	0	1	1
14	Canada (CAN)	0	0	1	1
14	Denmark (DEN)	0	0	1	1
14	Italy (ITA)	0	0	1	1
14	Netherlands (NED)	0	0	1	1
Totals (18 entries)		18	18	18	54
