= Grant Davies =

Australian sprint canoeist

Olympic medal record

Men's canoe sprint
Silver medal – second place	1988 Seoul	K-1 1000 m

Grant Davies (born 11 September 1963) is an Australian sprint canoeist who competed in the late 1980s. At the 1988 Summer Olympics in Seoul, he won a silver medal in the K-1 1000 m event. He was initially told that he had won the gold medal, but 11 minutes after the race the officials declared that Greg Barton had won the race by 0.005 seconds, the narrowest margin in Olympic history.

In 2009 Davies was inducted into the Queensland Sport Hall of Fame.
