= Josef Boháč =

Czech ice hockey player

Personal information
- Nationality: Czech
- Born: 20 April 1914; Prague, Austria-Hungary
- Died: September 12, 1989 (aged 75)

Sport
- Country: Czechoslovakia
- Sport: Ice hockey

Josef Boháč (20 April 1914 – 12 September 1989) was a Czech ice hockey player. He competed for Czechoslovakia in the men's tournament at the 1936 Winter Olympics.
