= Daniel Boháč =

Czech ice hockey player

- Born: February 13, 1980 (age 45); Opava, Czechoslovakia
- Height: 6 ft 0 in (183 cm)
- Weight: 196 lb (89 kg; 14 st 0 lb)
- Position: Forward
- Shot: Left
- Played for: HC Havířov; HC Vítkovice; BK Mladá Boleslav
- NHL draft: Undrafted
- Playing career: 1998–2016

Daniel Boháč (born February 13, 1980) is a Czech former professional ice hockey player. He played the majority of his career in the Czech Extraliga. He played with BK Mladá Boleslav in the ELH during the 2010–11 Czech Extraliga season.
