= Reiner Scholl =

German canoeist

Medal record

Men's canoe sprint

World Championships
Gold medal – first place	1986 Montreal	K-2 500 m
Silver medal – second place	1989 Plovdiv	K-4 500 m
Bronze medal – third place	1987 Duisburg	K-4 500 m

Reiner Scholl (born 31 May 1961) is a West German sprint canoeist who competed from the mid to late 1980s. He won a complete set of medals at the ICF Canoe Sprint World Championships with a gold (K-2 500 m: 1986), a silver (K-4 500 m: 1989), and a bronze (K-4 500 m: 1987).

Scholl also competed in two Summer Olympics, earning his best finish of fourth in the K-2 500 m event at Seoul in 1988.
