= Stepan Oshchepkov =

Medal record

Men's canoe sprint

Representing Soviet Union

Olympic Games
Gold medal – first place	1964 Tokyo	C-2 1000 m

World Championships
Gold medal – first place	1958 Prague	C-2 10000 m

Stepan Mikhaylovich Oschepkov (Russian: Степан Михайлович Ощепков; 9 January 1934 – 3 January 2012) was a Soviet sprint canoer who competed in the late 1950s and the early 1960s. He was born in Vladivostok, Primorsky Kray. Oschepkov won a gold medal in the C-2 10000 m event at the 1958 ICF Canoe Sprint World Championships in Prague. At the 1964 Summer Olympics in Tokyo, he won the gold in the C-2 1000 m event. He died in Vladivostok, on 3 January 2012, at age 77.
