= Michel Chapuis (sprint canoer) =

French sprint canoer

Olympic medal record

Men's canoe sprint
Silver medal – second place	1964 Tokyo	C-2 1000 m

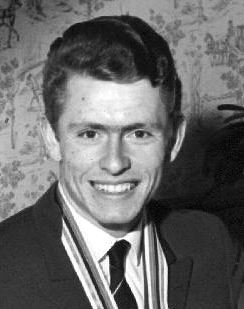
Michel Chapuis in 1964

Michel Chapuis (French pronunciation: [miʃɛl ʃapɥi]; born 18 June 1941) is a French sprint canoer who competed in the early 1960s. He won the silver medal in the C-2 1000 m event at the 1964 Summer Olympics in Tokyo.
