= Hristo Georgiev (canoeist) =

Bulgarian canoeist

Medal record

Men's canoe sprint

World Championships
Bronze medal – third place	1989 Plovdiv	C-4 1000 m

Hristo Georgiev (Bulgarian: Христо Георгиев) is a Bulgarian sprint canoer who competed in the late 1980s. He won a bronze medal in the C-4 1000 m event at the 1989 ICF Canoe Sprint World Championships in Plovdiv.
