= Árpád Soltész =

Hungarian sprint canoeist (born 1944)

Medal record

Men's canoe sprint

World Championships
Bronze medal – third place	1963 Jajce	C-2 1000 m
Bronze medal – third place	1966 East Berlin	C-2 1000 m

Árpád Soltész (born November 16, 1944) is a Hungarian sprint canoeist who competed in the 1960s. He won two bronze medals in the C-2 1000 m event at the ICF Canoe Sprint World Championships (1963, 1966).

Paired alongside Antal Hajba, Soltész also finished fourth in the C-2 1000 m event at the 1964 Summer Olympics in Tokyo.
