= Aleksandra Apanovich =

Soviet canoeist (born 1969)

Medal record

Women's canoe sprint

World Championships
Bronze medal – third place	1989 Plovdiv	K-2 5000 m
Bronze medal – third place	1989 Plovdiv	K-4 500 m

Aleksandra Apanovich (born December 6, 1969) is a Soviet sprint canoer who competed in the late 1980s. She won two bronze medals at the 1989 ICF Canoe Sprint World Championships in Plovdiv, earning them in the K-2 5000 m and K-4 500 m events.

Apanovich also finished fourth in the K-4 500 m event at the 1988 Summer Olympics in Seoul.

== Bibliography ==
- "ICF medalists for Olympic and World Championships – Part 1: flatwater (now sprint): 1936–2007" (PDF). Archived from the original (PDF) on January 5, 2010.
- "ICF medalists for Olympic and World Championships – Part 2: rest of flatwater (now sprint) and remaining canoeing disciplines: 1936–2007" (PDF). Archived from the original (PDF) on 2009-11-09.
- Sports-reference.com profile
