= Morten Ivarsen =

Norwegian canoeist

Personal information
- Born: 19 November 1966 (age 59) Bergen, Norway

Sport
- Sport: Canoe sprint
Medal record
Representing Norway
World Championships
Gold medal – first place	1987 Duisburg	K-4 10000 m
Bronze medal – third place	1987 Duisburg	K-1 1000 m
Bronze medal – third place	1991 Paris	K-1 10000 m
Summer Universiade
Gold medal – first place	1987 Zagreb	K-1 1000 m

Morten Ivarsen (born 19 November 1966) is a Norwegian sprint canoeist who competed from the late 1980s to the mid-1990s. He won three medals at the ICF Canoe Sprint World Championships with a gold (K-4 10000 m: 1987) and two bronze (K-1 1000 m: 1987, K-1 10000 m: 1991).

Ivarsen also competed in two Summer Olympics, earning his best finish of eighth in the K-1 1000 m event at Seoul in 1988.
