= Javier Álvarez (sprint canoeist) =

Spanish canoeist

Personal information
- Full name: Francisco Javier Álvarez Rosario
- Nationality: Spanish
- Born: 7 September 1967 (age 58) Badajoz, Spain

Francisco Javier Álvarez Rosario (Note: In this Spanish name, the first or paternal surname is Álvarez and the second or maternal family name is Rosario.) (born 7 September 1967) is a Spanish canoe sprinter who competed in the late 1980s. He was eliminated in the semifinals of the K-4 1000 m event at the 1988 Summer Olympics in Seoul.
