= Tomasz Franaszek =

Polish sprint canoer

Medal record

Men's canoe sprint

World Championships
| Bronze medal – third place | 1989 Plovdiv | K-4 10000 m |

Tomasz Franaszek is a Polish sprint canoer who competed in the late 1980s. He won a bronze medal in the K-4 10000 m event at the 1989 ICF Canoe Sprint World Championships in Plovdiv.
