= Peer Nielsen =

Danish canoeist

Olympic medal record

Men's canoe sprint
Bronze medal – third place	1964 Tokyo	C-2 1000 m

Peer Nielsen (sometimes shown as Peer Norrbohm, born 25 June 1942) is a Danish sprint canoeist who competed in the early 1960s. He won the bronze medal in the C-2 1000 m event at the 1964 Summer Olympics in Tokyo.
