= Jan Boháč =

Czech sprint canoer (born 1963)

Jan Boháč (born 22 April 1963 in Hradec Králové) is a Czech sprint canoer who competed for Czechoslovakia in the late 1980s. At the 1988 Summer Olympics in Seoul, he was eliminated in the semifinals of the K-2 500 m event. He later chaired the Czech Canoe Association.
