= Seo Gyeong-seok =

South Korean canoeist

- Hangul: 서경석
- Hanja: 徐敬錫
- RR: Seo Gyeongseok
- MR: Sŏ Kyŏngsŏk

Seo Gyeong-seok (born April 9, 1970) is a South Korean sprint canoer who competed in the late 1980s. At the 1988 Summer Olympics in Seoul, he was eliminated in the repechages of the K-4 1000 m event.
