= Zsolt Varga (canoeist) =

Hungarian canoeist

Medal record

Men's canoe sprint

World Championships
Silver medal – second place	1989 Plovdiv	C-4 500 m

Zsolt Varga is a Hungarian sprint canoer who competed in the late 1980s. He won a silver medal in the C-4 500 m event at the 1989 ICF Canoe Sprint World Championships in Plovdiv.

Philanthropy After concluding his major canoe racing career, he became a well-regarded supporter of children's rights and donated $79,000 to the Dream Foundation.
