= Viktor Denisov =

Russian sprint canoer

Medal record

Men's canoe sprint

Olympic Games
Silver medal – second place	1988 Seoul	K-2 500 m
Silver medal – second place	1988 Seoul	K-4 1000 m

World Championships
Gold medal – first place	1987 Duisburg	K-4 500 m
Gold medal – first place	1989 Plovdiv	K-4 500 m
Gold medal – first place	1993 Copenhagen	K-4 500 m
Gold medal – first place	1994 Mexico City	K-4 200 m
Gold medal – first place	1994 Mexico City	K-4 500 m
Gold medal – first place	1994 Mexico City	K-4 1000 m
Gold medal – first place	1995 Duisburg	K-4 500 m
Silver medal – second place	1985 Mechelen	K-4 500 m
Silver medal – second place	1986 Montreal	K-4 500 m
Silver medal – second place	1995 Duisburg	K-4 200 m
Bronze medal – third place	1987 Duisburg	K-4 1000 m
Bronze medal – third place	1993 Copenhagen	K-4 1000 m

Viktor Denisov (Russian: Виктор Денисов, born 2 April 1966 in Kalinin), is a Russian canoe sprinter who competed from the mid-1980s to the mid-1990s. He won two silver medals at the 1988 Summer Olympics in Seoul, earning them in the K-2 500 m and K-4 1000 m events.

Denisov also won twelve medals at the ICF Canoe Sprint World Championships with seven golds (K-4 200 m: 1994, K-4 500 m: 1987, 1989, 1993, 1994, 1995; K-4 1000 m: 1994), three silvers (K-4 200 m: 1995, K-4 500 m: 1985, 1986), and two bronzes (K-4 1000 m: 1987, 1993).

He trained at the Armed Forces sports society in Kalinin.
