= John Sørensen =

Danish canoeist (1934–2024)

Personal information
- Full name: John Rungsted Sørensen
- Nationality: Denmark
- Born: 5 October 1934 Copenhagen, Denmark
- Died: 26 October 2024 (aged 90)

Sport
- Sport: Canoeing
Medal record
Men's Canoeing
Representing Denmark
Olympics
Bronze medal – third place	1964 Tokyo	C-2 1000 m

John Rungsted Sørensen (5 October 1934 – 26 October 2024) was a Danish sprint canoer who competed in the early 1960s. He won the bronze medal in the C-2 1000 m event at the 1964 Summer Olympics in Tokyo. Sørensen died on 26 October 2024, at the age of 90.
