= Attila Ábrahám =

Hungarian canoeist (born 1967)

Personal information
- Born: 29 April 1967 (age 59) Kapuvár, Győr-Moson-Sopron, Hungary

Sport
- Sport: Canoe sprint
Medal record
Representing Hungary
Olympic Games
Gold medal – first place	1988 Seoul	K-4 1000 m
Silver medal – second place	1992 Barcelona	K-4 1000 m
Bronze medal – third place	1988 Seoul	K-2 500 m
World Championships
Gold medal – first place	1989 Plovdiv	K-2 10000 m
Gold medal – first place	1989 Plovdiv	K-4 1000 m
Gold medal – first place	1990 Poznań	K-4 1000 m
Gold medal – first place	1991 Paris	K-4 1000 m
Gold medal – first place	1993 Copenhagen	K-2 10000 m
Silver medal – second place	1991 Paris	K-4 500 m
Silver medal – second place	1993 Copenhagen	K-4 1000 m
Silver medal – second place	1995 Duisburg	K-4 1000 m
Bronze medal – third place	1990 Poznań	K-4 500 m
Bronze medal – third place	1993 Copenhagen	K-4 500 m
Summer Universiade
Gold medal – first place	1987 Zagreb	K-4 1000 m
Bronze medal – third place	1987 Zagreb	K-1 500 m

Attila Ábrahám (born 29 April 1967) is a Hungarian sprint canoeist who competed from the late 1980s to the mid-1990s. Completing in two Summer Olympics, he won a complete set of medals (gold - 1988: K-4 1000 m, silver - 1992: K-4 1000 m, bronze - 1988: K-2 500 m).

Ábrahám also won ten medals at the ICF Canoe Sprint World Championships with five golds (K-2 10000 m: 1989, 1993; K-4 1000 m: 1989, 1990, 1991), three silvers (K-4 500 m: 1991, K-4 1000 m: 1993, 1995), and two bronzes (K-4 500 m: 1990, 1993).
