= Igor Nagayev =

Soviet sprint canoeist (born 1966)

Medal record

Men's canoe sprint

Olympic Games
Silver medal – second place	1988 Seoul	K-2 500 m
Silver medal – second place	1988 Seoul	K-4 1000 m

World Championships
Bronze medal – third place	1986 Montreal	K-1 500 m

Igor Nagayev (born 22 February 1966) is a Soviet sprint canoeist who competed in the late 1980s and early 1990s. Competing in two Summer Olympics, he won two silver medals at Seoul in 1988, earning them in the K-2 500 m and K-4 1000 m events.

Nagayev also won a bronze medal in the K-1 500 m event at the 1986 ICF Canoe Sprint World Championships in Montreal.
