= Hans-Jörg Bliesener =

East German canoe racer (born 1966)

Medal record

Men's canoe sprint

Representing East Germany

Olympic Games
Bronze medal – third place	1988 Seoul	K-4 1000 m

World Championships
Silver medal – second place	1985 Mechelen	K-2 500 m
Silver medal – second place	1986 Montreal	K-4 1000 m

Hans-Jörg Bliesener (born 6 April 1966) is an East German sprint canoer who competed in the late 1980s. He won a bronze medal in the K-4 1000 m event at the 1988 Summer Olympics in Seoul.

Bliesener also won two silver medals at the ICF Canoe Sprint World Championships, earning them in the K-2 500 m (1985) and K-4 1000 m (1986).
