= Sándor Hódosi =

Hungarian canoeist (born 1966)

Medal record

Men's canoe sprint

Olympic Games
Gold medal – first place	1988 Seoul	K-4 1000 m

World Championships
Gold medal – first place	1989 Plovdiv	K-2 10000 m
Gold medal – first place	1989 Plovdiv	K-4 1000 m
Bronze medal – third place	1987 Duisburg	K-2 10000 m

Sándor Hódosi (born 28 April 1966 in Budapest) is a Hungarian sprint canoeist who competed in the late 1980s. At the 1988 Summer Olympics in Seoul, he won a gold in the K-4 1000 m event.

Hódosi also won three medals at the ICF Canoe Sprint World Championships with two golds (K-2 10000 m and K-4 1000 m: both 1989) and a bronze (K-2 10000 m: 1987).
