= Andreas Stähle =

East German canoeist (born 1965)

Medal record

Men's canoe sprint

Olympic Games
Silver medal – second place	1988 Seoul	K-1 500 m
Bronze medal – third place	1988 Seoul	K-4 1000 m

World Championships
Gold medal – first place	1983 Tampere	K-4 500 m
Gold medal – first place	1985 Mechelen	K-1 500 m
Gold medal – first place	1986 Montreal	K-4 500 m
Silver medal – second place	1983 Tampere	K-4 1000 m
Silver medal – second place	1987 Duisburg	K-1 500 m
Silver medal – second place	1990 Poznań	K-4 500 m
Bronze medal – third place	1983 Tampere	K-1 500 m

Andreas Stähle (born 14 February 1965) is an East German sprint canoer who competed from the mid-1980s to the early 1990s. He won two medals at the 1988 Summer Olympics in Seoul with a silver in the K-1 500 m and a bronze in the K-4 1000 m events.

Stähle also won seven medals at the ICF Canoe Sprint World Championships with three golds (K-1 500 m: 1985, K-4 500 m: 1983, 1986), three silvers (K-1 500 m: 1987, K-4 500 m: 1990, K-4 1000 m: 1983), and a bronze (K-1 500 m: 1983).
