= Zsolt Gyulay =

Hungarian canoeist (born 1964)

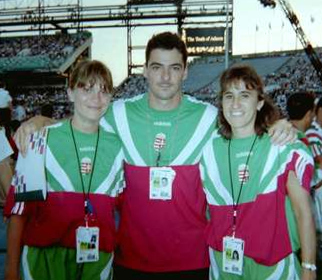
- Gyulay (center) at the 1996 Olympics

Personal information
- Born: 12 September 1964 (age 61) Vác, Hungary
- Height: 187 cm (6 ft 2 in)
- Weight: 90 kg (198 lb)

Sport
- Sport: Canoe sprint
- Club: Bp. Honvéd; MTK Budapest
Medal record
Representing Hungary
Olympic Games
Gold medal – first place	1988 Seoul	K-1 500 m
Gold medal – first place	1988 Seoul	K-4 1000 m
Silver medal – second place	1992 Barcelona	K-1 500 m
Silver medal – second place	1992 Barcelona	K-4 1000 m
World Championships
Gold medal – first place	1986 Montreal	K-4 1000 m
Silver medal – second place	1986 Montreal	K-1 500 m
Gold medal – first place	1987 Duisburg	K-4 1000 m
Gold medal – first place	1989 Plovdiv	K-1 1000 m
Gold medal – first place	1989 Plovdiv	K-4 1000 m
Gold medal – first place	1990 Poznań	K-4 1000 m
Gold medal – first place	1991 Paris	K-4 1000 m
Bronze medal – third place	1991 Paris	K-1 500 m
Bronze medal – third place	1991 Paris	K-2 500 m
Silver medal – second place	1993 Copenhagen	K-4 1000 m
Bronze medal – third place	1993 Copenhagen	K-4 500 m
Silver medal – second place	1995 Duisburg	K-2 500 m
Silver medal – second place	1995 Duisburg	K-4 1000 m
Bronze medal – third place	1995 Duisburg	K-2 200 m

Zsolt Gyulai (born 12 September 1964) is a Hungarian sprint canoeist. He competed at 1988, 1992 and 1996 Olympics and won four medals: two gold (1988: K-1 500 m, K-4 1000 m) and two silver (1992: K-1 500 m, K-4 1000 m). He also won fourteen medals at the world championships: six golds (K-1 1000 m: 1989, K-4 1000 m: 1986, 1987, 1989, 1990, 1991), four silvers (K-1 500 m: 1986, K-2 500 m: 1995, K-4 1000 m: 1993, 1995), and four bronzes (K-1 500 m: 1991, K-2 200 m: 1995, K-2 500 m: 1991, K-4 500 m: 1993).

Gyulay was elected President of the Hungarian Olympic Committee (MOB) on 29 January 2022, succeeding Krisztián Kulcsár. He took the position on 1 February 2022, shortly before the start of the 2022 Winter Olympics.

== Awards ==
- Hungarian kayaker of the Year (3): 1988, 1989, 1992
- Order of Merit of the Hungarian People's Republic – Order of Stars (1988)
- Order of Merit of the Republic of Hungary – Small Cross (1992)
- MOB Golden ring (1995)

Sporting positions
Preceded by Krisztián Kulcsár	President of the Hungarian Olympic Committee; 2022–	Incumbent
