= Fred Heese =

Canadian canoeist (1943–2024)

Frederick Hartmut Heese (February 21, 1943 – February 28, 2024) was a Canadian sprint canoer who competed in the mid-1960s. He finished seventh in the C-2 1000 m event at the 1964 Summer Olympics in Tokyo. Singapore engaged Fred as the Technical Director for the Singapore National Dragon Boat Team. He assumed the position in mid-2009. Heese led the Singapore Dragon Boat team in the 2010 Asian Games in China, November 2010. Heese died on February 28, 2024, at the age of 81.
