= Aleksandr Motuzenko =

Personal information
- Full name: Aleksandr Alekseyevich Motuzenko
- Born: 11 July 1967 (age 59) Smila, Cherkasy, Ukrainian SSR
Medal record
Men's canoe sprint
Representing the Soviet Union
Olympic Games
Silver medal – second place	1988 Seoul	K-4 1000 m
World Championships
Gold medal – first place	1987 Duisburg	K-4 500 m
Gold medal – first place	1989 Plovdiv	K-4 500 m
Gold medal – first place	1990 Poznań	K-4 500 m
Silver medal – second place	1986 Montreal	K-4 500 m
Silver medal – second place	1990 Poznań	K-4 1000 m
Bronze medal – third place	1987 Duisburg	K-4 1000 m

Aleksandr Alekseyevich Motuzenko (Russian: Александр Алексеевич Мотузенко, born 11 July 1967), also known as Oleksandr Oleksiyovych Motuzenko (Ukrainian: Олександр Олексійович Мотузенко), is a Soviet-born Ukrainian sprint canoer who competed in the late 1980s and early 1990s. At the 1988 Summer Olympics in Seoul, he won a silver medal in the K-4 1000 m event.

Motuzenko also won six medals at the ICF Canoe Sprint World Championships with three golds (K-4 500 m: 1987, 1989, 1990), two silver (K-4 500 m: 1986, K-4 1000 m: 1990), and a bronze (K-4 1000 m: 1987).
