= Sergey Kirsanov =

Medal record

Men's canoe sprint

Olympic Games
Silver medal – second place	1988 Seoul	K-4 1000 m

World Championships
Gold medal – first place	1987 Duisburg	K-4 500 m
Gold medal – first place	1989 Plovdiv	K-4 500 m
Gold medal – first place	1990 Poznań	K-4 500 m
Silver medal – second place	1986 Montreal	K-4 500 m
Silver medal – second place	1990 Poznań	K-4 1000 m
Bronze medal – third place	1987 Duisburg	K-4 1000 m
Bronze medal – third place	1991 Paris	K-4 500 m

Sergey Kirsanov (Сергій Кірсанов) (born 2 January 1963 in Ukraine) is a Soviet and Ukrainian sprint canoeist who competed in the late 1980s and early 1990s. Competing in two Summer Olympics, he won a silver medal in the K-4 1000 m event at Seoul in 1988.

Kirsanov also won seven medals at the ICF Canoe Sprint World Championships with three golds (K-4 500 m: 1987, 1989, 1990), two silvers (K-4 500 m: 1986, K-4 1000 m: 1990), and two bronzes (K-4 500 m: 1991, K-4 1000 m: 1987).
