= Greg Barton =

American sprint kayaker (born 1959)

Personal information
- Full name: Gregory Mark Barton
- Born: December 2, 1959 (age 66) Jackson, Michigan, U.S.
Medal record
Men's canoe sprint
Representing the United States
Olympic Games
Gold medal – first place	1988 Seoul	K-1 1000 m
Gold medal – first place	1988 Seoul	K-2 1000 m
Bronze medal – third place	1984 Los Angeles	K-1 1000 m
Bronze medal – third place	1992 Barcelona	K-1 1000 m
World Championships
Gold medal – first place	1985 Mechelen	K-1 10000 m
Gold medal – first place	1987 Duisburg	K-1 1000 m
Gold medal – first place	1987 Duisburg	K-1 10000 m
Gold medal – first place	1991 Paris	K-1 10000 m
Silver medal – second place	1990 Poznań	K-1 10000 m
Bronze medal – third place	1991 Paris	K-1 1000 m
Pan American Games
Gold medal – first place	1987 Indianapolis	K-1 1000m
Gold medal – first place	1987 Indianapolis	K-2 1000m

Gregory Mark Barton (born December 2, 1959) is an American sprint kayaker who competed from the mid-1980s to the early 1990s.

During his career he won four Olympic medals, including two gold medals, and four world championship titles.

== Career ==
Competing in three Summer Olympics, Barton won four medals with two golds (K-1 1000 m, K-2 1000 m: both 1988) and two bronzes (1984, 1992: both in K-1 1000 m).

Barton also won six medals at the ICF Canoe Sprint World Championships with four golds (K-1 1000 m: 1987, K-1 10000 m: 1985, 1987, 1991), a silver (K-1 10000 m: 1990), and a bronze (K-1 1000 m: 1991).

He received a BSE degree in mechanical engineering in 1983 from the University of Michigan, where he was a member of Chi Phi fraternity. He lives in Seattle, WA with his wife, the former Justine Smith, and their two daughters.

The Greg Barton Cup Challenge for the United States Canoe Association is named in his honor. Shortly before he competed in the Olympics, Barton moved to Homer, Michigan. The traffic circle downtown was named in his honor after he won his gold medals. His brother, Bruce, competed in canoeing for the United States at the 1976 Summer Olympics in Montreal.

Barton currently co-owns and operates Epic Kayaks, which makes high-end kayaks, surfskis, and paddles. His daughters are Hayley and Kendall.

Greg and Kevin Olney won the first SEVENTY48 human powered race in an Epic Surf Ski averaging about 7 mph for the 70 miles from Tacoma, WA to Port Townsend, WA on June 11–12, 2018.
