= André Wohllebe =

German canoeist (1962–2014)

Medal record

Men's canoe sprint

Olympic Games
Gold medal – first place	1992 Barcelona	K-4 1000 m
Bronze medal – third place	1988 Seoul	K-1 1000 m
Bronze medal – third place	1988 Seoul	K-4 1000 m

World Championships
Gold medal – first place	1983 Tampere	K-2 500 m
Gold medal – first place	1983 Tampere	K-2 1000 m
Gold medal – first place	1985 Mechelen	K-4 500 m
Gold medal – first place	1986 Montreal	K-4 500 m
Gold medal – first place	1991 Paris	K-4 500 m
Gold medal – first place	1991 Paris	K-4 10000 m
Gold medal – first place	1993 Copenhagen	K-4 1000 m
Gold medal – first place	1993 Copenhagen	K-4 10000 m
Silver medal – second place	1986 Montreal	K-2 1000 m
Silver medal – second place	1990 Poznań	K-4 500 m
Silver medal – second place	1991 Paris	K-4 1000 m
Silver medal – second place	1993 Copenhagen	K-4 500 m
Bronze medal – third place	1981 Nottingham	K-4 500 m
Bronze medal – third place	1985 Mechelen	K-4 1000 m
Bronze medal – third place	1989 Plovdiv	K-4 1000 m
Bronze medal – third place	1990 Poznań	K-4 1000 m
Bronze medal – third place	1994 Mexico City	K-4 1000 m
Bronze medal – third place	1995 Duisburg	K-4 200 m

André Gerhard Wohllebe (9 January 1962 – 29 December 2014) was an East German-German sprint canoeist who competed from the early 1980s to the mid-1990s. Competing in two Summer Olympics, he won three medals with a gold (1992: K-4 1000 m) and two bronzes (1988: K-1 1000 m, K-4 1000 m). He was born in Berlin.

Wohllebe also won eighteen medals at the ICF Canoe Sprint World Championships with eight golds (K-2 500 m: 1983, K-2 1000 m: 1983, K-4 500 m: 1985, 1986, 1991; K-4 1000 m: 1993, K-4 10000 m: 1991, 1993), four silvers (K-2 1000 m: 1986, K-4 500 m: 1990, 1993; K-4 1000 m: 1991), and six bronzes (K-4 200 m: 1995, K-4 500 m: 1981, K-4 1000 m: 1985, 1989, 1990, 1994).
