= Ferenc Csipes =

Hungarian sprint canoeist

Medal record

Men's canoe sprint

Olympic Games
Gold medal – first place	1988 Seoul	K-4 1000 m
Silver medal – second place	1992 Barcelona	K-4 1000 m
Silver medal – second place	1996 Atlanta	K-4 1000 m
Bronze medal – third place	1988 Seoul	K-2 500 m

World Championships
Gold medal – first place	1985 Mechelen	K-1 1000 m
Gold medal – first place	1986 Montreal	K-1 10000 m
Gold medal – first place	1986 Montreal	K-4 1000 m
Gold medal – first place	1987 Duisburg	K-2 500 m
Gold medal – first place	1987 Duisburg	K-4 1000 m
Gold medal – first place	1989 Plovdiv	K-4 1000 m
Gold medal – first place	1990 Poznań	K-4 1000 m
Gold medal – first place	1991 Paris	K-4 1000 m
Silver medal – second place	1986 Montreal	K-1 1000 m
Silver medal – second place	1987 Duisburg	K-1 1000 m
Silver medal – second place	1989 Plovdiv	K-4 10000 m
Silver medal – second place	1991 Paris	K-1 1000 m
Bronze medal – third place	1987 Duisburg	K-2 10000 m
Bronze medal – third place	1990 Poznań	K-4 500 m
Bronze medal – third place	1991 Paris	K-2 500 m
Bronze medal – third place	1994 Mexico City	K-4 500 m

Ferenc Csipes (born 8 March 1965 in Budapest) is a Hungarian sprint canoeist who competed from 1985 to 1996. Competing in three Summer Olympics, he won four medals with one gold (1988: K-4 1000 m), two silvers (1992, 1996: both K-4 1000 m), and one bronze (1988: K-2 500 m).

Csipes also won sixteen ICF Canoe Sprint World Championships medals with eight golds (K-1 1000 m: 1985, K-1 10000 m: 1986, K-2 500 m: 1987, K-4 1000 m: 1986, 1987, 1989, 1990, 1991), four silvers (K-1 1000 m: 1986, 1987, 1991; K-4 10000 m: 1989), and four bronzes (K-2 500 m: 1991, K-4 500 m: 1990, 1994; K-2 10000 m: 1987).

== Awards ==
- Hungarian kayaker of the Year (4): 1985, 1986, 1987, 1991
- Order of Merit of the Hungarian People's Republic – Order of Stars (1988)
- Cross of Merit of the Republic of Hungary – Golden Cross (1992)
- Order of Merit of the Republic of Hungary – Small Cross (1996)
- Hungarian Coach of the Year (1) - votes of sports journalists: 2011
- Order of Merit of Hungary – Officer's Cross (2012)
- Papp László Budapest Sport awards (2012)
- Order of Merit of Hungary – Commander's Cross (2016)
