= South Africa at the 1992 Summer Olympics =

- Flag used to represent South Africa at the 1992 Summer Olympic Games
- IOC code: RSA
- NOC: South African Sports Confederation and Olympic Committee

in Barcelona
- Competitors: 93 (68 men and 25 women) in 19 sports
- Flag bearer: Jan Tau
- Medals Ranked 41st: Gold 0 Silver 2 Bronze 0 Total 2

Summer Olympics appearances (overview)
- 1904; 1908; 1912; 1920; 1924; 1928; 1932; 1936; 1948; 1952; 1956; 1960; 1964–1988; 1992; 1996; 2000; 2004; 2008; 2012; 2016; 2020; 2024; 2028

South Africa competed at the Summer Olympic Games for the first time since 1960 at the 1992 Summer Olympics in Barcelona, Spain. South Africa was permitted to re-join the Olympic Movement after its white citizens voted to abolish apartheid. 93 competitors, 68 men and 25 women, took part in 87 events in 19 sports.

== Flag, anthem and team logo ==
Logo of the Olympic Committee of South Africa

As a result of a dispute over what flag and anthem to use, the team participated in these games under a specially designed sporting flag. The flag consisted of a white field charged with a grey diamond, which represented the country's mineral wealth, three cascading bands of blue, orange, and green, which represented the sea, the land, and agriculture respectively, and the Olympic rings. Team uniforms included the emblem of Olympic Committee of South Africa, which depicted Olympic rings surrounded by olive branches, with the name of the country above. The Olympic Committee of South Africa stated that Ludwig van Beethoven's "Ode to Joy" was picked as the team's anthem instead of the national anthem at the time, "Die Stem van Suid-Afrika", at these games to "represent national unity". During the opening ceremony, the flag was carried by marathon runner Jan Tau.

== Medalists ==
Medal	Name	Sport	Event	Date
Silver	Wayne Ferreira; Piet Norval	Tennis	Men's doubles	7 August
Silver	Elana Meyer	Athletics	Women's 10,000 metres	7 August

== Competitors ==
The following is the list of number of competitors in the Games.

Sport	Men	Women	Total
Archery	1	1	2
Athletics	8	8	16
Badminton	2	0	2
Boxing	2	–	2
Canoeing	9	2	11
Cycling	4	1	5
Diving	1	0	1
Equestrian	2	1	3
Fencing	3	2	5
Modern pentathlon	1	0	1
Rowing	9	0	9
Sailing	11	0	11
Shooting	2	0	2
Swimming	6	4	10
Synchronized swimming	–	2	2
Table tennis	1	1	2
Tennis	3	3	6
Weightlifting	1	–	1
Wrestling	3	–	3
Total	68	25	93

== Archery ==
In South Africa's debut appearance in Olympic archery, the nation was represented by two archers. Neither advanced past the ranking round.

Men

Athlete	Event	Ranking round		Round of 32	Round of 16	Quarterfinals	Semifinals	Final	
Athlete	Event	Score	Seed	Score	Score	Score	Score	Score	Rank
Malcolm Todd	Individual	1188	68	Did not advance					

Women

Athlete	Event	Ranking round		Round of 32	Round of 16	Quarterfinals	Semifinals	Final	
Athlete	Event	Score	Seed	Score	Score	Score	Score	Score	Rank
Johanna Schenk	Individual	1184	56	Did not advance					

== Athletics ==
Men
Track & road events

Athlete	Event	Heat		Quarterfinal		Semifinal		Final	
Athlete	Event	Result	Rank	Result	Rank	Result	Rank	Result	Rank
Abel Mokibe	Marathon	—N/a						2:17.24	25
Bobang Phiri	400 m	45.57	2 Q	45.27	3 Q	45.59	7	Did not advance	
Zithulele Sinqe	Marathon	—N/a						DNF	
Jan Tau	Marathon	—N/a						DNF	
Abel Tshaka Nzimande	200 m	21.43	4 Q	DNS		Did not advance			
Andries Vorster	400 m hurdles	49.75	4	Did not advance					
Xolile Yawa	10000 m	28:28.78	7 Q	—N/a				28:37.18	13

Women
Track & road events

Athlete	Event	Heat		Quarterfinal		Semifinal		Final	
Athlete	Event	Result	Rank	Result	Rank	Result	Rank	Result	Rank
Myrtle Bothma	400 m hurdles	55.60	3 Q	—N/a		54.53	4 Q	DNF	
Colleen De Reuck	Marathon	—N/a						2:39.03	9
Elana Meyer	10000 m	32:05.45	2 Q	—N/a				31:11.75	Silver medal
Zola Pieterse	3000 m	9:07.10	9	Did not advance					
Elinda Vorster	100 m	11.45	3 Q	11.44	4 Q	11.44	6	Did not advance	
Elinda Vorster	200 m	23.14	2 Q	22.99	3 Q	23.08	7	Did not advance	
Marcel Winkler	100 m	12.01	40	Did not advance					

Field events

Athlete	Event	Qualification		Final	
Athlete	Event	Distance	Position	Distance	Position
Karen Botha	Long jump	6.43	17	Did not advance	
Charmaine Weavers	High jump	1.75	39	Did not advance	

== Badminton ==
Athlete	Event	First round	Second round	Third round	Quarterfinal	Semifinal	Final / BM	
Athlete	Event	Opposition Score	Opposition Score	Opposition Score	Opposition Score	Opposition Score	Opposition Score	Rank
Anton Kriel	Men's singles	Arni Hallgrimsson (ISL); L 8–15, 7–15	Did not advance					
Nico Meerholz	Men's singles	Chan Kin Ngai (HKG); L 7–15, 4–15	Did not advance					
Anton Kriel; Nico Meerholz	Men's doubles	—N/a	Shuji Matsuno; Shinji Matsuura (JPN); L 4–15, 2–15	Did not advance				

== Boxing ==
Men

Athlete	Event	1 Round	2 Round	3 Round	Quarterfinals	Semifinals	Final
Athlete	Event	Opposition Result	Opposition Result	Opposition Result	Opposition Result	Opposition Result	Rank
Abram Thwala	Light Flyweight	Rafael Lozano (ESP); L 0–9	Did not advance				
Giovanni Pretorius	Welterweight	Sören Antman (SWE); L RSC-1	Did not advance				

== Canoeing ==
=== Slalom ===
Athlete	Event	Preliminary				Final	
Athlete	Event	Run 1	Rank	Run 2	Rank	Best	Rank
Corran Addison	Men's K-1	157.63	38	150.71	34	150.71	38
Alexander Rennie	Men's K-1	126.79	31	198.12	39	126.79	36
Gary Wade	Men's K-1	270.61	40	162.93	36	162.93	40

=== Sprint ===
Men

Athlete	Event	Heats		Repechages		Semifinals		Final	
Athlete	Event	Time	Rank	Time	Rank	Time	Rank	Time	Rank
Willem van Riet	K-1 500 m	1:47.98	5 Q	1:46.33	4	Did not advance			
Mark Perrow	K-1 1000 m	3:45.29	5 Q	3:36.13	2 Q	3:40.20	7	Did not advance	
Hermann Kotze; Bennie Reynders	K-2 500 m	1:37.44	4 Q	1:36.50	5	Did not advance			
Willem van Riet; Barry Hayward	K-2 1000 m	3:29.38	6 Q	3:24.15	4	Did not advance			
Mark Perrow; Hermann Kotze; Bennie Reynders; Oscar Chalupsky	K-4 1000 m	3:06.36	5 Q	—N/a		3:10.82	8	Did not advance	

Women

Athlete	Event	Heats		Repechages		Semifinals		Final	
Athlete	Event	Time	Rank	Time	Rank	Time	Rank	Time	Rank
Dene Simpson	K-1 500 m	2:06.62	7 Q	—N/a		2:02.42	8	Did not advance	
Lesley Carstens; Dene Simpson	K-2 500 m	1:52.02	5 Q	—N/a		1:54.80	9	Did not advance	

== Cycling ==
Five cyclists, four men and one woman, represented South Africa in 1992.

=== Road ===
Men

Athlete	Event	Time	Rank
Scott Richardson	Men's road race	4:58:25	81
Wayne Burgess	Men's road race		DNF
Malcolm Lange	Men's road race		DNF

Women

Athlete	Event	Time	Rank
Jacqueline Martin	Women's road race	2:15:42	46

=== Track ===
Time trial

Athlete	Event	Time	Rank
Sean Bloch	Team time trial	1:10.145	26

Men's Sprint

Athlete	Event	Qualifying round		Round 2	Round 2 repechage	Round 2 repechage final	Round 3	Round 3 repechage	Quarter-finals	Classification 5–8	Semi-finals	Finals	
Athlete	Event	Time	Rank	Opposition Time Speed (km/h)	Opposition Time Speed (km/h)	Opposition Time Speed (km/h)	Opposition Time Speed (km/h)	Opposition Time Speed (km/h)	Opposition Time Speed (km/h)	Opposition Time Speed (km/h)	Opposition Time Speed (km/h)	Time	Rank
Sean Bloch	Men's sprint	12.186	22	Magné (FRA); Jeřábek (TCH); L	Ķiksis (LAT); L	Did not advance							

Pursuit

Athlete	Event	Qualification		Quarterfinals	Semifinals	Final	
Athlete	Event	Time	Rank	Opposition Time	Opposition Time	Opposition Time	Rank
Malcolm Lange	Men's individual pursuit	ovtk	DNF	Did not advance			

== Diving ==
Men

Athlete	Event	Preliminaries		Final	
Athlete	Event	Points	Rank	Points	Rank
Craig Vaughan	3 m springboard	297.51	30	Did not advance	

== Equestrianism ==
Athlete	Horse	Event	Dressage		Cross-country			Jumping			Total	
Athlete	Horse	Event	Dressage		Cross-country			Final			Total	
Athlete	Horse	Event	Penalties	Rank	Penalties	Total	Rank	Penalties	Total	Rank	Penalties	Rank
David Peter Rissik	Schiroubles	Individual	93.00	81	36.80	129.80	34	20.25	150.05	30	150.05	30

=== Show jumping ===
Athlete	Horse	Event	Qualification								Final				Total	
Athlete	Horse	Event	Round 1		Round 2		Round 3		Total		Round A		Round B		Total	
Athlete	Horse	Event	Penalties	Rank	Penalties	Rank	Penalties	Rank	Total	Rank	Penalties	Rank	Penalties	Rank	Total	Rank
Peter Hans Walther Gotz	Didi	Individual	64.50	23	56.00	28	84.50	3	205.00	6 Q	20,25	35	Did not advance			
Gonda Joyce Betrix	Tommy	Individual	10.00	78	17.00	71	0	0	27,0	79	Did not advance					

== Fencing ==
Five fencers, three men and two women, represented South Africa in 1992.

Men

=== Individual ===
Athlete	Event	Elimination round	Round I	Repechage Round I	Round II	Repechage Round II	Round III	Repechage Round III	Round IV	Quarterfinal	Semifinal	Final / BM	
Athlete	Event	Opposition Score	Opposition Score	Opposition Score	Opposition Score	Opposition Score	Opposition Score	Opposition Score	Opposition Score	Opposition Score	Opposition Score	Opposition Score	Rank
Hein van Garderen	Individual foil	51	Did not advance										51
Hein van Garderen	Individual épée	70	Did not advance										70
Hein van Garderen	Individual sabre	42	Did not advance										42
Trevor Strydom	Individual épée	68	Did not advance										68
Dario Torrente	Individual foil	54	Did not advance										54
Dario Torrente	Individual épée	67	Did not advance										67
Dario Torrente	Individual sabre	36	Did not advance										36

Women

=== Individual ===
Athlete	Event	Elimination round	Round I	Repechage Round I	Round II	Repechage Round II	Round III	Repechage Round III	Round IV	Quarterfinal	Semifinal	Final / BM	
Athlete	Event	Opposition Score	Opposition Score	Opposition Score	Opposition Score	Opposition Score	Opposition Score	Opposition Score	Opposition Score	Opposition Score	Opposition Score	Opposition Score	Rank
Heidi Botha	Individual foil	44	Did not advance										44
Rencia Nasson	Individual foil	46	Did not advance										46

== Modern pentathlon ==
One male pentathlete represented South Africa in 1992.

Athlete	Event	Shooting (10 m air pistol)	Fencing (épée one touch)	Swimming (200 m freestyle)	Riding (show jumping)	Running (3000 m)	Total points	Final rank
Athlete	Event	Points	Points	Points	Points	Points	Total points	Final rank
Trevor Strydom	Men's	507	1192	1150	961	1010	4820	50

== Rowing ==
Men

Athlete	Event	Heats		Repechage		Semifinals		Final	
Athlete	Event	Time	Rank	Time	Rank	Time	Rank	Time	Rank
Martin Walsh; Rogan Clarke; Grant Hillary; Andrew Gordon-Brown; Erich Mauff; Timothy Lahner; Robin McCall; Ivan Pentz; Andrew Lonmon-Davis	Eight	5:37.83	3 Q	—N/a		5:45.13	5	5:42.58	8

== Sailing ==
Men

Athlete	Event	Race										Net points	Final rank
Athlete	Event	1	2	3	4	5	6	7	8	9	10	Net points	Final rank
William Tyson	Lechner A-390	~~37~~	31	28	31	37	31	29	37	32	37	347.0	35
Ian Richard Ainslie	Finn	10	12	11	16	11	17	~~20~~	—N/a			113.0	18
Martin E. Lambrecht; Alec G. H. Lanham Love	470	25	32	30	34	~~35~~	27	31	—N/a			215.0	35

Open

Athlete	Event	Race										Net points	Final rank
Athlete	Event	1	2	3	4	5	6	7	8	9	10	Net points	Final rank
David Beresford Hudson; David Michael Kitchen	Flying Dutchman	5	16	~~22~~	20	16	22	14	—N/a			128.0	19
Eric Johnstone Cook; Geoffrey L. Stevens	Tornado	~~21~~	20	20	21	21	20	20	—N/a			158.0	21
Bruce Savage; Richard James Mayhew; Giles Canham Stanley	Soling	13	8	~~15~~	12	7	20	—N/a				85.0	14

== Shooting ==
Men

Athlete	Event	Qualification		Final	
Athlete	Event	Score	Rank	Score	Rank
Manfred Fiess	Men's 50 metre rifle prone	588	43	Did not advance	

Open

Athlete	Event	Qualification		Final	
Athlete	Event	Score	Rank	Score	Rank
Cornelius Jansen Bornman	Trap	127	52	Did not advance	

== Swimming ==
Men

Athlete	Event	Heat		Final B		Final	
Athlete	Event	Time	Rank	Time	Rank	Time	Rank
Kenneth Cawood	100 m breaststroke	1:04.02	27	Did not advance			
Kenneth Cawood	100 m breaststroke	2:21.88	33	Did not advance			
Darryl Cronje	50 m freestyle	23.39	22	Did not advance			
Craig Jackson	100 m butterfly	55.45	26	Did not advance			
Craig Jackson	200 m butterfly	2:02.17	28	Did not advance			
Seddon Keyter	100 m freestyle	51.42	29	Did not advance			
Seddon Keyter	100 m backstroke	57.94	32	Did not advance			
Clifford Lyne	200 m breaststroke	2:25.66	41	Did not advance			
Clifford Lyne	200 m medley	2:06.62	27	Did not advance			
Clifford Lyne	400 m medley	4:32.64	24	Did not advance			
Peter Williams	50 m freestyle	22.65	5	Did not advance		22.50	4
Peter Williams; Darryl Cronje; Seddon Keyter; Craig Jackson	4 × 100 m freestyle	3:23.53	11	—N/a		Did not advance	
Seddon Keyter; Kenneth Cawood; Peter Williams; Darryl Cronje	4 × 100 m medley	3:46.86	14	—N/a		Did not advance	

Women

Athlete	Event	Heat		Final B		Final	
Athlete	Event	Time	Rank	Time	Rank	Time	Rank
Jill Brukman	100 m backstroke	1:04.57	22	Did not advance			
Jill Brukman	200 m backstroke	2:18.56	32	Did not advance			
Jill Brukman	200 m individual medley	2:23.07	28	Did not advance			
Jill Brukman	400 m individual medley	5:03.34	27	Did not advance			
Penny Heyns	100 m breaststroke	1:14.99	33	Did not advance			
Penny Heyns	200 m breaststroke	2:45.04	34	Did not advance			
Marianne Kriel	50 m freestyle	26.05	9	26.47	13	Did not advance	
Marianne Kriel	100 m freestyle	57.50	20	Did not advance			
Marianne Kriel	100 m backstroke	1:03.20	12	1:03.12	10	Did not advance	
Marianne Kriel	100 m butterfly	1:02.49	21	Did not advance			
Jeanine Steenkamp	400 m freestyle	4:23.33	21	Did not advance			
Jeanine Steenkamp	800 m freestyle	8:59.62	19	Did not advance			
Jeanine Steenkamp	400 m individual medley	4:58.48	25	Did not advance			
Jill Brukman; Jeanine Steenkamp; Penny Heyns; Marianne Kriel	4 × 100 m medley	4:24.28	16	—N/a		Did not advance	

== Synchronized swimming ==
Two synchronized swimmers represented South Africa in 1992.

Athlete	Event	Figures		Technical routine		Free routine		Qualification		Technical routine		Free routine		Final	
Athlete	Event	Points	Rank	Points	Rank	Points	Rank	Total	Rank	Points	Rank	Points	Rank	Total	Rank
Amanda Taylor	Women's solo	75.821	49	Did not advance											
Loren Wulfsohn	Women's solo	72.633	50	Did not advance											
Amanda Taylor; Loren Wulfsohn	Women's duet	74.227	17	74.227	17	78.16	17	152.387	17	Did not advance					

== Table tennis ==
Men

Athlete	Event	Group stage				Round of 16	Quarterfinals	Semifinals	Final	
Athlete	Event	Opposition Result	Opposition Result	Opposition Result	Rank	Opposition Result	Opposition Result	Opposition Result	Opposition Result	Rank
Louis Botha	Men's singles	Andrzej Grubba (POL); L 0–2	Cláudio Kano (BRA); L 0–2	Roland Vimi (TCH); L 0–2	4	Did not advance				

Women

Athlete	Event	Group stage				Round of 16	Quarterfinals	Semifinals	Final	
Athlete	Event	Opposition Result	Opposition Result	Opposition Result	Rank	Opposition Result	Opposition Result	Opposition Result	Opposition Result	Rank
Cheryl Roberts	Women's singles	Alessia Arisi (ITA); L 0–2	Elke Schall-Wosik (GER); L 0–2	Qiao Hong (CHN); L 0–2	4	Did not advance				

== Tennis ==
Men

Athlete	Event	Round of 64	Round of 32	Round of 16	Quarterfinals	Semifinals	Final / BM	
Athlete	Event	Opposition Score	Opposition Score	Opposition Score	Opposition Score	Opposition Score	Opposition Score	Rank
Wayne Ferreira	Singles	Christo van Rensburg (RSA); W 7–5, 6–2, 2–6, 6–4	Marc Rosset (SUI); L 4–6, 0–6, 2–6	Did not advance				
Christo van Rensburg	Singles	Wayne Ferreira (RSA); L 5–7, 2–6, 6–2, 4–6	Did not advance					
Wayne Ferreira; Piet Norval	Doubles	Did not advance	Bent-Ove Pedersen; Christian Ruud (NOR); W 6–2, 6–4, 5–7, 6–3	Brian Gyetko; Sebastien LeBlanc (CAN); W 6–3, 7–6, 6–4	George Cosac; Dinu Pescariu (ROU); W 6–0, 6–3, 6–2	Goran Ivanišević; Goran Prpić (CRO); W 7–6, 3–6, 6–3, 2–6, 6–2	Boris Becker; Michael Stich (GER); L 6–7, 6–4, 6–7, 3–6	Silver medal

Women

Athlete	Event	Round of 64	Round of 32	Round of 16	Quarterfinals	Semifinals	Final / BM	
Athlete	Event	Opposition Score	Opposition Score	Opposition Score	Opposition Score	Opposition Score	Opposition Score	Rank
Amanda Coetzer	Singles	Zina Garrison (USA); W 7–5, 6–1	Agnese Blumberga (LAT); W 6–2, 6–4	Conchita Martínez (ESP); L 4–6, 3–6	Did not advance			
Mariaan de Swardt	Singles	Patricia Tarabini (ARG); L 4–6, 2–6	Did not advance					
Elna Reinach	Singles	Jennifer Capriati (USA); L 1–6, 0–6	Did not advance					

== Weightlifting ==
Men

Athlete	Event	Snatch		Clean & jerk		Total	Rank
Athlete	Event	Result	Rank	Result	Rank	Total	Rank
Pieter Smith	82.5 kg	120,0	29	150	27	270,0	27

== Wrestling ==
Men's freestyle

Athlete	Event	Elimination Pool							Final round	
Athlete	Event	Round 1 Result	Round 2 Result	Round 3 Result	Round 4 Result	Round 5 Result	Round 6 Result	Rank	Final round Result	Rank
Tjaart du Plessis	−62 kg	Karsten Polky (GER); L 3–5	İsmail Faikoğlu (TUR); L 0–9	—N/a				11	Did not advance	
Barend Labuschagne	−74 kg	Amir Reza Khadem (IRN); L 0–10	Yoshihiko Hara (JPN); L 1–7	—N/a				8	Did not advance	
Johannes Rossouw	−100 kg	Miroslav Makaveev (BUL); L 5–6	Leri Khabelov (EUN); L 1–8	—N/a				7	Did not advance	
