= Canoeing at the 1996 Summer Olympics – Men's K-1 1000 metres =

Men's K-1 1000 metres at the Games of the XXVI Olympiad
- Venue: Lake Lanier
- Dates: 30 July 1996 (heats & repechage); 1 August 1996 (semifinals); 3 August 1996 (final)
- Competitors: 23 from 23 nations
- Winning time: 3:25.785

Medalists
1st place, gold medalist(s)		Knut Holmann	Norway
2nd place, silver medalist(s)		Beniamino Bonomi	Italy
3rd place, bronze medalist(s)		Clint Robinson	Australia

The men's K-1 1000 metres event was an individual kayaking event conducted as part of the Canoeing at the 1996 Summer Olympics program.

== Medalists ==
Gold	Silver	Bronze
Knut Holmann (NOR)	Beniamino Bonomi (ITA)	Clint Robinson (AUS)

== Results ==
=== Heats ===
The 23 competitors first raced in three heats. The top three finishers from each of the heats advanced directly to the semifinals while the remaining competitors competed in the repechages.

Heat 1
1.	Mikko Kolehmainen (FIN)	3:48.075	QS
2.	Andrzej Gajewski (POL)	3:49.507	QS
3.	Abelardo Sztrum (ARG)	3:50.547	QS
4.	José Garcia (POR)	3:56.059	QR
5.	Vincent Olla (FRA)	3:58.075	QR
6.	Andrey Safaryan (KAZ)	4:00.599	QR
7.	Erik Gervais (CAN)	4:01.707	QR
8.	Ivan Kireyev (UZB)	4:05.299	QR
Heat 2
1.	Knut Holmann (NOR)	3:45.192	QS
2.	Agustín Calderon (ESP)	3:45.484	QS
3.	Marin Popescu (ROU)	3:47.968	QS
4.	Róbert Erban (SVK)	3:48.956	QR
5.	Sebastián Cuattrin (BRA)	3:49.308	QR
6.	Michael Harbold (USA)	3:58.760	QR
7.	Hain Helde (EST)	3:59.136	QR
Heat 3
1.	Beniamino Bonomi (ITA)	3:43.520	QS
2.	Clint Robinson (AUS)	3:44.768	QS
3.	Lutz Liwowski (GER)	3:44.776	QS
4.	Ivan Lawler (GBR)	3:51.580	QR
5.	Vladyslav Tereshchenko (UKR)	3:51.772	QR
6.	Zoltán Kammerer (HUN)	4:02.724	QR
7.	Tom Krantz (SWE)	4:03.324	QR
8.	Miezan Edoukou (CIV)	4:31.680	QR

=== Repechages ===
Two repechages were held. The top four finishers in each repechage and the fastest fifth-place finisher advanced to the semifinals.

Repechage 1
1.	Sebastián Cuattrin (BRA)	4:02.627	QS
2.	Vincent Olla (FRA)	4:04.147	QS
3.	Zoltán Kammerer (HUN)	4:05.859	QS
4.	Ivan Lawler (GBR)	4:06.555	QS
5.	Hain Helde (EST)	4:08.375	QS
6.	Erik Gervais (CAN)	4:08.743
7.	Miezan Edoukou (CIV)	4:44.155
Repechage 2
1.	Róbert Erban (SVK)	4:01.917	QS
2.	Michael Harbold (USA)	4:05.225	QS
3.	José Garcia (POR)	4:05.677	QS
4.	Vladyslav Tereshchenko (UKR)	4:08.681	QS
5.	Tom Krantz (SWE)	4:10.057
6.	Andrey Safaryan (KAZ)	4:10.633
7.	Ivan Kireyev (UZB)	4:12.105

=== Semifinals ===
The top four finishers from each of the two semifinals along with the fastest fifth-place finisher advanced to the final.

Semifinal 1
1.	Beniamino Bonomi (ITA)	3:40.631	QF
2.	Knut Holmann (NOR)	3:41.635	QF
3.	Lutz Liwowski (GER)	3:42.567	QF
4.	Andrzej Gajewski (POL)	3:43.399	QF
5.	Sebastián Cuattrin (BRA)	3:44.443	QF
6.	Abelardo Sztrum (ARG)	3:44.587
7.	Michael Harbold (USA)	3:44.663
8.	José Garcia (POR)	3:48.859
9.	Ivan Lawler (GBR)	3:55.583
Semifinal 2
1.	Clint Robinson (AUS)	3:43.657	QF
2.	Marin Popescu (ROU)	3:44.249	QF
3.	Agustín Calderon (ESP)	3:44.777	QF
4.	Mikko Kolehmainen (FIN)	3:45.613	QF
5.	Róbert Erban (SVK)	3:46.633
6.	Hain Helde (EST)	3:47.237
7.	Zoltán Kammerer (HUN)	3:49.589
8.	Vincent Olla (FRA)	3:51.537
9.	Vladyslav Tereshchenko (UKR)	3:55.649

=== Final ===
The final took place on August 3.

Gold	Knut Holmann (NOR)	3:25.785
Silver	Beniamino Bonomi (ITA)	3:27.073
Bronze	Clint Robinson (AUS)	3:29.713
4.	Lutz Liwowski (GER)	3:30.025
5.	Agustín Calderon (ESP)	3:31.397
6.	Andrzej Gajewski (POL)	3:32.521
7.	Marin Popescu (ROU)	3:34.549
8.	Sebastián Cuattrin (BRA)	3:34.669
9.	Mikko Kolehmainen (FIN)	3:35.841

Robinson led for the first 250 meters before Holmann took over to lead at 500 meters. Bonomi took the lead at the 750 meter mark before Holmann, using a wooden boat, pulled away to win by over a boat length.
