= Canoeing at the 1992 Summer Olympics – Men's K-1 500 metres =

The men's K-1 500 metres event was an individual kayaking event conducted as part of the Canoeing at the 1992 Summer Olympics program that took place at Castelldefels.

== Medalists ==
Gold	Silver	Bronze
Mikko Kolehmainen (FIN)	Zsolt Gyulay (HUN)	Knut Holmann (NOR)

== Results ==
=== Heats ===
28 competitors first raced in four heats. The top two finishers from each of the heats advanced directly to the semifinals with the rest competing in the repechages.

Heat 1
1.	Sergey Kalesnik (EUN)	1:40.90	QS
2.	Norman Bellingham (USA)	1:41.00	QS
3.	Knut Holmann (NOR)	1:41.18	QR
4.	Martin Hunter (AUS)	1:43.32	QR
5.	John MacDonald (NZL)	1:44.37	QR
6.	Gregorio Vicente (ESP)	1:46.68	QR
7.	Simon Parsons (GBR)	1:47.50	QR
Heat 2
1.	Roberto Liberato (SUI)	1:42.02	QS
2.	Kalle Sundqvist (SWE)	1:42.40	QS
3.	José Garcia (POR)	1:42.96	QR
4.	Patrick Holmes (IRL)	1:43.46	QR
5.	Zvonimir Krzanić (CRO)	1:46.46	QR
6.	Angel Pérez (CUB)	1:48.32	QR
7.	Sebastián Cuattrin (BRA)	1:48.86	QR
Heat 3
1.	Mikko Kolehmainen (FIN)	1:41.13	QS
2.	Daniele Scarpa (ITA)	1:41.41	QS
3.	Zsolt Gyulay (HUN)	1:41.78	QR
4.	Grzegorz Kotowicz (POL)	1:44.58	QR
5.	Enrique Leite (URU)	1:49.49	QR
6.	Roberto Heinze Flamand (MEX)	1:51.06	QR
Heat 4
1.	Renn Crichlow (CAN)	1:41.39	QS
2.	Marin Popescu (ROU)	1:41.69	QS
3.	Artūras Vieta (LTU)	1:41.96	QR
4.	Attila Szabó (TCH)	1:44.85	QR
5.	Willem van Riet (RSA)	1:47.98	QR
6.	Žarko Vekić (IOP)	1:51.44	QR
7.	Anisi (INA)	1:51.96	QR
8.	Gang Gi-Jin (KOR)	1:52.22	QR

=== Repechages ===
The top three finishers from each of the three repechages along with the fourth fastest advanced to the semifinals.

Repechage 1
1.	Knut Holmann (NOR)	1:40.36	QS
2.	Artūras Vieta (LTU)	1:41.04	QS
3.	Grzegorz Kotowicz (POL)	1:41.68	QS
4.	Gregorio Vicente (ESP)	1:41.72	QS
5.	Zvonimir Krzanić (CRO)	1:43.40
6.	Žarko Vekić (IOP)	1:55.32
Repechage 2
1.	Angel Pérez (CUB)	1:41.28	QS
2.	Attila Szabó (TCH)	1:41.40	QS
3.	José Garcia (POR)	1:41.84	QS
4.	Martin Hunter (AUS)	1:42.00
5.	Simon Parsons (GBR)	1:46.32
6.	Enrique Leite (URU)	1:49.00
7.	Anisi (INA)	1:51.69
Repechage 3
1.	Zsolt Gyulay (HUN)	1:41.44	QS
2.	John MacDonald (NZL)	1:43.24	QS
3.	Patrick Holmes (IRL)	1:43.96	QS
4.	Willem van Riet (RSA)	1:46.33
5.	Sebastián Cuattrin (BRA)	1:46.56
6.	Roberto Heinze Flamand (MEX)	1:47.76
7.	Gang Gi-Jin (KOR)	1:51.64

=== Semifinals ===
The top four finishers in each of the two semifinals along with the fifth fastest advanced to the final.

Semifinal 1
1.	Mikko Kolehmainen (FIN)	1:41.52	QF
2.	Marin Popescu (ROU)	1:41.83	QF
3.	Knut Holmann (NOR)	1:41.96	QF
4.	Sergey Kalesnik (EUN)	1:42.20	QF
5.	Zsolt Gyulay (HUN)	1:42.70	QF
6.	Kalle Sundqvist (SWE)	1:42.90
7.	Attila Szabó (TCH)	1:42.99
8.	Grzegorz Kotowicz (POL)	1:43.70
9.	Patrick Holmes (IRL)	1:45.11
Semifinal 2
1.	Norman Bellingham (USA)	1:41.48	QF
2.	Daniele Scarpa (ITA)	1:42.07	QF
3.	Artūras Vieta (LTU)	1:42.09	QF
4.	Roberto Liberato (SUI)	1:42.82	QF
5.	Renn Crichlow (CAN)	1:43.06
6.	John MacDonald (NZL)	1:43.41
7.	Gregorio Vicente (ESP)	1:43.53
8.	Angel Pérez (CUB)	1:43.94
9.	José Garcia (POR)	1:45.88

=== Final ===
The final was held on August 7.

Gold	Mikko Kolehmainen (FIN)	1:40.34
Silver	Zsolt Gyulay (HUN)	1:40.64
Bronze	Knut Holmann (NOR)	1:40.71
4.	Norman Bellingham (USA)	1:40.84
5.	Sergey Kalesnik (EUN)	1:40.90
6.	Roberto Liberato (SUI)	1:41.98
7.	Daniele Scarpa (ITA)	1:42.00
8.	Marin Popescu (ROU)	1:42.24
9.	Artūras Vieta (LTU)	1:42.34

Kolehmainen was only seventh at the halfway mark before coming from behind to beat defending Olympic champion Gyulay.
