= Canoeing at the 1992 Summer Olympics – Men's K-2 500 metres =

The men's K-2 500 metres event was a pairs kayaking event conducted as part of the Canoeing at the 1992 Summer Olympics program that took place at Castelldefels.

== Medalists ==
Gold	Silver	Bronze
Kay Bluhm and Torsten Gutsche (GER)	Maciej Freimut and Wojciech Kurpiewski (POL)	Bruno Dreossi and Antonio Rossi (ITA)

== Results ==
=== Heats ===
30 crews were entered into the event. The top two finishers from each of the four heats advanced directly to the semifinals while the remaining teams were relegated to the repechages.

Heat 1
1.	Maciej Freimut and Wojciech Kurpiewski (POL)	1:34.76	QS
2.	Antonio Rossi and Bruno Dreossi (ITA)	1:35.04	QS
3.	Jesper Staal and Thor Nielsen (DEN)	1:37.85	QR
4.	Jan-Dirk Nijkamp and Marc Weijzen (NED)	1:40.58	QR
5.	Juan Labrin and Fernando Chaparro (ARG)	1:41.77	QR
6.	Ferenc Csipes and Zsolt Gyulay (HUN)	1:41.85	QR
7.	Alvaro Koslowski and Jefferson Lacerda (BRA)	1:43.23	QR
8.	Olivier Lasak and Philippe Aubertin (FRA)	1:49.42	QR
Heat 2
1.	Kay Bluhm and Torsten Gutsche (GER)	1:33.95	QS
2.	Mikko Kolehmainen and Olli Kolehmainen (FIN)	1:35.75	QS
3.	Kalle Sundqvist and Gunnar Olsson (SWE)	1:35.84	QR
4.	Daniel Collins and Andrew Trim (AUS)	1:36.07	QR
5.	Ian Ferguson and Paul MacDonald (NZL)	1:36.43	QR
6.	José da Silva and Joaquim Queiróz (POR)	1:37.73	QR
7.	Antoon De Brauwer and Bart Stalmans (BEL)	1:41.84	QR
8.	Luk Kwok Sun and Chung Chi Lok (HKG)	1:54.10	QR
Heat 3
1.	Michael Harbold and Peter Newton (USA)	1:32.42	QS
2.	Romică Șerban and Geza Magyar (ROU)	1:32.60	QS
3.	Juraj Kadnár and Róbert Erban (TCH)	1:33.45	QR
4.	Peter Ribe and Thomas Roander (NOR)	1:33.84	QR
5.	Ivan Lawler and Grayson Bourne (GBR)	1:36.00	QR
6.	Alan Carey and Conor Holmes (IRL)	1:41.51	QR
7.	Ju Jong-Gwan and Park Gi-Jeong (KOR)	1:45.73	QR
8.	Koutoua Abia and Drissa Traouré (CIV)	1:46.95	QR
Heat 4
1.	Sergey Kaleshink and Anatoli Tishchenko (EUN)	1:31.57	QS
2.	Juan José Román and Juan Manuel Sánchez (ESP)	1:33.61	QS
3.	Kenneth Padvaiskas and Jason Rusu (CAN)	1:34.33	QR
4.	Hermann Kotze and Bennie Reynders (RSA)	1:37.44	QR
5.	Milko Kazakov and Petar Godev (BUL)	1:39.36	QR
6.	Abdul Razak and Abdul Karim (INA)	1:43.81	QR

=== Repechages ===
The 22 crews raced in three repechages. The top three finishers from each of the repechages and the fastest fourth-place finisher advanced directly to the semifinals.

Repechage 1
1.	Jesper Staal and Thor Nielsen (DEN)	1:31.22	QS
2.	Ferenc Csipes and Zsolt Gyulay (HUN)	1:31.27	QS
3.	Kenneth Padvaiskas and Jason Rusu (CAN)	1:32.11	QS
4.	Ian Ferguson and Paul MacDonald (NZL)	1:32.28	QS
5.	Peter Ribe and Thomas Roander (NOR)	1:33.67
6.	Abdul Razak and Abdul Karim (INA)	1:41.23
7.	Ju Jong-Gwan and Park Gi-Jeong (KOR)	1:43.54
8.	Luk Kwok Sun and Chung Chi Lok (HKG)	1:48.20
Repechage 2
1.	Kalle Sundqvist and Gunnar Olsson (SWE)	1:31.12	QS
2.	José da Silva and Joaquim Queiróz (POR)	1:33.57	QS
3.	Ivan Lawler and Grayson Bourne (GBR)	1:33.96	QS
4.	Jan-Dirk Nijkamp and Marc Weijzen (NED)	1:36.00
5.	Hermann Kotze and Bennie Reynders (RSA)	1:36.50
6.	Alvaro Koslowski and Jefferson Lacerda (BRA)	1:37.15
7.	Koutoua Abia and Drissa Traouré (CIV)	1:47.72
Repechage 3
1.	Juraj Kadnár and Róbert Erban (TCH)	1:32.14	QS
2.	Daniel Collins and Andrew Trim (AUS)	1:32.14	QS
3.	Olivier Lasak and Philippe Aubertin (FRA)	1:32.51	QS
4.	Milko Kazakov and Petar Godev (BUL)	1:33.42
5.	Antoon De Brauwer and Bart Stalmans (BEL)	1:33.51
6.	Alan Carey and Conor Holmes (IRL)	1:37.37
7.	Juan Labrin and Fernando Chaparro (ARG)	1:37.70

Brazil's intermediate time was not listed in the official report.

=== Semifinals ===
The top four finishers in each of the two semifinals and the faster fifth-place finisher advanced to the final.

Semifinal 1
1.	Antonio Rossi and Bruno Dreossi (ITA)	1:29.36	QF
2.	Sergey Kaleshink and Anatoli Tishchenko (EUN)	1:29.43	QF
3.	Kalle Sundqvist and Gunnar Olsson (SWE)	1:29.76	QF
4.	Michael Harbold and Peter Newton (USA)	1:29.80	QF
5.	Ferenc Csipes and Zsolt Gyulay (HUN)	1:29.85	QF
6.	Daniel Collins and Andrew Trim (AUS)	1:31.99
7.	Ivan Lawler and Grayson Bourne (GBR)	1:32.38
8.	Mikko Kolehmainen and Olli Kolehmainen (FIN)	1:32.57
9.	Olivier Lasak and Philippe Aubertin (FRA)	1:33.20
Semifinal 2
1.	Kay Bluhm and Torsten Gutsche (GER)	1:28.11	QF
2.	Maciej Freimut and Wojciech Kurpiewski (POL)	1:29.66	QF
3.	Jesper Staal and Thor Nielsen (DEN)	1:30.02	QF
4.	Juan José Román and Juan Manuel Sánchez (ESP)	1:30.42	QF
5.	Romică Șerban and Geza Magyar (ROU)	1:30.83
6.	Ian Ferguson and Paul MacDonald (NZL)	1:31.02
7.	José da Silva and Joaquim Queiróz (POR)	1:32.33
8.	Juraj Kadnár and Róbert Erban (TCH)	1:32.41
9.	Kenneth Padvaiskas and Jason Rusu (CAN)	1:34.06

=== Final ===
The final was held on August 7.

Gold	Kay Bluhm and Torsten Gutsche (GER)	1:28.27
Silver	Maciej Freimut and Wojciech Kurpiewski (POL)	1:29.84
Bronze	Antonio Rossi and Bruno Dreossi (ITA)	1:30.00
4.	Juan José Román and Juan Manuel Sánchez (ESP)	1:30.93
5.	Kalle Sundqvist and Gunnar Olsson (SWE)	1:31.48
6.	Jesper Staal and Thor Nielsen (DEN)	1:31.84
7.	Ferenc Csipes and Zsolt Gyulay (HUN)	1:32.34
8.	Michael Harbold and Peter Newton (USA)	1:33.02
9.	Sergey Kaleshink and Anatoli Tishchenko (EUN)	1:33.76

The German's margin of victory is the largest in a men's 500 meter kayak event in Olympic history.
