= Canoeing at the 1992 Summer Olympics – Men's K-1 1000 metres =

The men's K-1 1000 metres event was an individual kayaking event conducted as part of the Canoeing at the 1992 Summer Olympics program.

== Medalists ==
Gold	Silver	Bronze
Clint Robinson (AUS)	Knut Holmann (NOR)	Greg Barton (USA)

== Results ==
=== Heats ===
The 26 competitors first raced in four heats. The top two finishers from each of the heats advanced directly to the semifinals while the remaining competitors competed in the repechages.

Heat 1
1.	Beniamino Bonomi (ITA)	3:39.44	QS
2.	Artūras Vieta (LTU)	3:40.81	QS
3.	John MacDonald (NZL)	3:43.17	QR
4.	Graham Burns (GBR)	3:43.84	QR
5.	Pär Lindén (SWE)	3:43.89	QR
6.	Enrique Leite (URU)	3:49.02	QR
7.	Srđan Marilović (IOP)	3:50.02	QR
Heat 2
1.	Clint Robinson (AUS)	3:38.80	QS
2.	Renn Crichlow (CAN)	3:39.66	QS
3.	Roberto Liberato (SUI)	3:40.22	QR
4.	Patrick Holmes (IRL)	3:44.78	QR
5.	Óscar García (ESP)	3:45.08	QR
6.	Anisi (INA)	4:06.90	QR
Heat 3
1.	Thor Nielsen (DEN)	3:39.86	QS
2.	Ferenc Cspies (HUN)	3:40.49	QS
3.	Jens Stegemann (GER)	3:43.22	QR
4.	Igor Nagayev (EUN)	3:44.29	QR
5.	Mark Perrow (RSA)	3:45.29	QR
6.	Park Gi-Jeong (KOR)	4:06.89	QR
Heat 4
1.	Knut Holmann (NOR)	3:35.70	QS
2.	Marin Popescu (ROU)	3:36.49	QS
3.	Greg Barton (USA)	3:36.59	QR
4.	José Garcia (POR)	3:46.82	QR
5.	Róbert Erban (TCH)	3:48.96	QR
6.	Zvonimir Krzanić (CRO)	3:54.02	QR
7.	Sebastián Cuattrin (BRA)	4:09.13	QR

=== Repechages ===
Three repechages were held. The top three finishers in each repechage and the fastest fourth-place finisher advanced to the semifinals.

Repechage 1
1.	Greg Barton (USA)	3:32.34	QS
2.	Igor Nagayev (EUN)	3:34.15	QS
3.	John MacDonald (NZL)	3:35.07	QS
4.	Óscar García (ESP)	3:36.70	QS
5.	Zvonimir Krzanić (CRO)	3:36.77
6.	Enrique Leite (URU)	3:40.20
Repechage 2
1.	José Garcia (POR)	3:34.92	QS
2.	Mark Perrow (RSA)	3:36.13	QS
3.	Roberto Liberato (SUI)	3:36.89	QS
4.	Graham Burns (GBR)	3:38.48
5.	Sebastián Cuattrin (BRA)	3:41.68
6.	Srđan Marilović (IOP)	3:45.52
7.	Anisi (INA)	3:54.36
Repechage 3
1.	Jens Stegemann (GER)	3:33.15	QS
2.	Róbert Erban (TCH)	3:33.90	QS
3.	Patrick Holmes (IRL)	3:35.62	QS
4.	Park Gi-Jeong (KOR)	3:58.18
-	Pär Lindén (SWE)	3:36.37	DISQ

The official report had Park qualifying for the semifinals as the fastest fourth-place finisher when it was actually García. Lindén's disqualification was not disclosed in the official report.

=== Semifinals ===
The top four finishers from each of the two semifinals along with the fastest fifth-place finisher advanced to the final.

Semifinal 1
1.	Greg Barton (USA)	3:36.34	QF
2.	Thor Nielsen (DEN)	3:36.35	QF
3.	Marin Popescu (ROU)	3:37.30	QF
4.	Beniamino Bonomi (ITA)	3:37.53	QF
5.	Renn Crichlow (CAN)	3:38.40	QF
6.	John MacDonald (NZL)	3:38.95
7.	Mark Perrow (RSA)	3:40.20
8.	Jens Stegemann (GER)	3:41.72
9.	Patrick Holmes (IRL)	3:42.07
Semifinal 2
1.	Knut Holmann (NOR)	3:35.21	QF
2.	Clint Robinson (AUS)	3:36.59	QF
3.	José Garcia (POR)	3:37.34	QF
4.	Artūras Vieta (LTU)	3:37.54	QF
5.	Róbert Erban (TCH)	3:38.86
6.	Roberto Liberato (SUI)	3:39.89
7.	Óscar García (ESP)	3:41.84
8.	Igor Nagayev (EUN)	3:45.85
9.	Ferenc Cspies (HUN)	3:49.73

=== Final ===
The final took place on August 8.

Gold	Clint Robinson (AUS)	3:37.26
Silver	Knut Holmann (NOR)	3:37.50
Bronze	Greg Barton (USA)	3:37.93
4.	Marin Popescu (ROU)	3:38.37
5.	Beniamino Bonomi (ITA)	3:41.12
6.	José Garcia (POR)	3:41.60
7.	Thor Nielsen (DEN)	3:41.70
8.	Renn Crichlow (CAN)	3:43.46
9.	Artūras Vieta (LTU)	3:46.92

Robinson stayed closed to Holmann throughout the race, then surged ahead at the end. For the first time in Robinson's life, his body went numb from pushing himself so hard. It took Robinson six hours to produce a urine sample for doping control due to him being so dehydrated after the final.
