= Canoeing at the 1992 Summer Olympics – Men's K-2 1000 metres =

The men's K-2 1000 metres event was a pairs kayaking event conducted as part of the Canoeing at the 1992 Summer Olympics program. The official report did not make clear on the third repechage, two semifinals, and final which events were the men's K-2 1000 m event and the men's K-4 1000 m event and would thus create confusion to the average reader.

== Medalists ==
Gold	Silver	Bronze
Kay Bluhm and Torsten Gutsche (GER)	Gunnar Olsson and Kalle Sundqvist (SWE)	Grzegorz Kotowicz and Dariusz Białkowski (POL)

== Results ==
=== Heats ===
27 crews entered in four heats. The top two finishers from each of the heats advanced directly to the semifinals. One crew did not finish while the remaining teams were relegated to the repechages.

Heat 1
1.	Florntin Tataru and Alexandru Popa (ROU)	3:19.52	QS
2.	Kenneth Padvaiskas and Jason Rusu (CAN)	3:21.09	QS
3.	José da Silva and Joaquim Queiróz (POR)	3:22.46	QR
4.	Antoon De Brauwer and Bart Stalmans (BEL)	3:23.48	QR
5.	James Block and Reuben Burgess (GBR)	3:24.16	QR
6.	Willem van Riet and Bennie Reynders (RSA)	3:29.38	QR
7.	Abdul Razak and Abdul Karim (INA)	3:29.88	QR
8.	Luk Kwok Sun and Chung Chi Lok (HKG)	3:50.30	QR
Heat 2
1.	Kay Bluhm and Torsten Gutsche (GER)	3:13.36	QS
2.	Juan José Román and Juan Manuel Sánchez (ESP)	3:21.64	QS
3.	Paolo Luschi and Daniele Scarpa (ITA)	3:28.24	QR
4.	Grzegorz Kotowicz and Dariusz Białkowski (POL)	3:30.92	QR
5.	Alan Carey and Conor Holmes (IRL)	3:35.03	QR
6.	Alvaro Koslowski and Jefferson Lacerda (BRA)	3:48.59	QR
Heat 3
1.	Peter Ribe and Thomas Roander (NOR)	3:18.02	QS
2.	Ian Ferguson and Paul MacDonald (NZL)	3:18.47	QS
3.	Krisztián Bártfai and András Rajna (HUN)	3:18.52	QR
4.	Angel Pérez and Marlo Marcheco (CUB)	3:19.83	QR
5.	Philippe Boccara and Pascal Boucherit (FRA)	3:26.81	QR
6.	Srđan Marilović and Žarko Vekić (IOP)	3:31.69	QR
Heat 4
1.	Gunnar Olsson and Kalle Sundqvist (SWE)	3:12.19	QS
2.	Greg Barton and Norman Bellingham (USA)	3:15.74	QS
3.	René Kučera and Petr Hruška (TCH)	3:17.86	QR
4.	Ivan Kireyev and Anatoly Tyurin (EUN)	3:19.67	QR
5.	Daniel Collins and Andrew Trim (AUS)	3:24.02	QR
6.	Jan-Dirk Nijkamp and Marc Weijzen (NED)	3:31.52	QR
-	Ju Jong-Gwan and Park Gi-Jeong (KOR)	Did not finish

=== Repechages ===
The top three crews in each of the three repechages and the fastest fourth-place finisher advanced to the semifinals.

Repechage 1
1.	Paolo Luschi and Daniele Scarpa (ITA)	3:15.34	QS
2.	Angel Pérez and Marlo Marcheco (CUB)	3:18.01	QS
3.	James Block and Reuben Burgess (GBR)	3:19.78	QS
4.	Daniel Collins and Andrew Trim (AUS)	3:20.18
5.	Srđan Marilović and Žarko Vekić (IOP)	3:38.17
Repechage 2
1.	Grzegorz Kotowicz and Dariusz Białkowski (POL)	3:15.58	QS
2.	Ivan Kireyev and Anatoly Tyurin (EUN)	3:17.04	QS
3.	Philippe Boccara and Pascal Boucherit (FRA)	3:18.13	QS
4.	José da Silva and Joaquim Queiróz (POR)	3:18.42	QS
5.	Jan-Dirk Nijkamp and Marc Weijzen (NED)	3:20.18
6.	Abdul Razak and Abdul Karim (INA)	3:26.64
7.	Alvaro Koslowski and Jefferson Lacerda (BRA)	3:31.45
Repechage 3
1.	Krisztián Bártfai and András Rajna (HUN)	3:18.80	QS
2.	René Kučera and Petr Hruška (TCH)	3:19.57	QS
3.	Antoon De Brauwer and Bart Stalmans (BEL)	3:21.73	QS
4.	Willem van Riet and Bennie Reynders (RSA)	3:24.15
5.	Alan Carey and Conor Holmes (IRL)	3:27.48
6.	Luk Kwok Sun and Chung Chi Lok (HKG)	3:45.63

=== Semifinals ===
The top four finishers in each of the two semifinals and the fastest fifth-place finisher advanced to the final.

Semifinal 1
1.	Gunnar Olsson and Kalle Sundqvist (SWE)	3:16.66	QF
2.	Grzegorz Kotowicz and Dariusz Białkowski (POL)	3:18.55	QF
3.	René Kučera and Petr Hruška (TCH)	3:19.75	QF
4.	Juan José Román and Juan Manuel Sánchez (ESP)	3:20.30	QF
5.	Philippe Boccara and Pascal Boucherit (FRA)	3:21.02
6.	Peter Ribe and Thomas Roander (NOR)	3:21.76
7.	Kenneth Padvaiskas and Jason Rusu (CAN)	3:24.14
8.	Antoon De Brauwer and Bart Stalmans (BEL)	3:25.96
9.	Angel Pérez and Marlo Marcheco (CUB)	3:26.18
Semifinal 2
1.	Kay Bluhm and Torsten Gutsche (GER)	3:17.64	QF
2.	Greg Barton and Norman Bellingham (USA)	3:17.93	QF
3.	Paolo Luschi and Daniele Scarpa (ITA)	3:18.52	QF
4.	Krisztián Bártfai and András Rajna (HUN)	3:19.28	QF
5.	Ian Ferguson and Paul MacDonald (NZL)	3:19.29	QF
6.	Ivan Kireyev and Anatoly Tyurin (EUN)	3:21.62
7.	Florntin Tataru and Alexandru Popa (ROU)	3:22.45
8.	José da Silva and Joaquim Queiróz (POR)	3:22.75
9.	James Block and Reuben Burgess (GBR)	3:23.77

=== Final ===
The final was held on August 8.

Gold	Kay Bluhm and Torsten Gutsche (GER)	3:16.10
Silver	Gunnar Olsson and Kalle Sundqvist (SWE)	3:17.70
Bronze	Grzegorz Kotowicz and Dariusz Białkowski (POL)	3:18.86
4.	Greg Barton and Norman Bellingham (USA)	3:19.26
5.	Paolo Luschi and Daniele Scarpa (ITA)	3:20.34
6.	Krisztián Bártfai and András Rajna (HUN)	3:20.71
7.	René Kučera and Petr Hruška (TCH)	3:23.12
8.	Ian Ferguson and Paul MacDonald (NZL)	3:26.84
9.	Juan José Román and Juan Manuel Sánchez (ESP)	3:43.43
