= Nijkamp =

Nijkamp is a surname. Notable people with the surname include:

- Gerard Nijkamp (born 1970), Dutch soccer player and manager
- Heleen Nijkamp (married Mees, born 1968), Dutch opinion writer, economist and lawyer
- Jan-Dirk Nijkamp (born 1964), Dutch sprint canoer
- Marieke Nijkamp (born 1986), Dutch novelists
- Peter Nijkamp (born 1946), Dutch economist, Professor of Regional Economics and Economic Geography
- Rose Marie Nijkamp (born 2006), Dutch tennis player
