= Petr Hruška =

Petr Hruška may refer to:

- Petr Hruška (poet) (born 1964), Czech poet, screenwriter, literary critic and academic
- Petr Hruška (canoeist) (born 1971), Czech sprint canoeist
