= Uncle Toby =

Uncle Toby or Uncle Tobys may refer to:

- Uncle Toby (character), in the novel The Life and Opinions of Tristram Shandy, Gentleman by Laurence Sterne
- Uncle Tobys, an Australian food manufacturing company which specialises in breakfast oat products
- Uncle Toby's Super Series was a professional Australian Iron Man circuit that ran from 1989 to 2001
- Uncle Tobys Hardcourts or Australian Hard Court Championships, a former professional tennis tournament established in 1938 and held until 2008
