= Heleen =

Heleen is a Dutch version of the feminine given name Helena. People with the name include:

- Heleen Aafje Boering (born 1964), Dutch water polo goalkeeper
- Heleen Van Arkel-de Greef (born 1965), Dutch chess master
- Heleen Hage (born 1958), Dutch road racing cyclist
- Heleen Herbert (born 1972), Dutch politician
- Heleen Jaques (born 1988), Belgian footballer
- Heleen Mees (born 1968), Dutch opinion writer, economist, and lawyer
- Heleen Peerenboom (born 1980), Dutch water polo player
- Heleen van Royen (born 1958), Dutch novelist and columnist
- Heleen Sancisi Weerdenburg (1944–2000), Dutch ancient historian
- Heleen bij de Vaate (born 1974), Dutch triathlete
