= Clint Robinson (canoeist) =

Australian sprint kayaker (born 1972)

Medal record

Men's canoe sprint

Olympic Games
Gold medal – first place	1992 Barcelona	K-1 1000 m
Silver medal – second place	2004 Athens	K-2 500 m
Bronze medal – third place	1996 Atlanta	K-1 1000 m

World Championships
Gold medal – first place	1994 Mexico City	K-1 1000 m
Silver medal – second place	1991 Paris	K-4 10000 m
Silver medal – second place	1995 Duisburg	K-1 1000 m
Bronze medal – third place	1994 Mexico City	K-2 500 m

Clint David Robinson, OAM, born 27 July 1972, is an Australian sprint kayaker and surf lifesaver. He won three medals at the Summer Olympics: gold in the K-1 1000 meters at the 1992 Barcelona Olympics, silver in the K-2 500 meters at the 2004 Athens Olympics, and bronze in the K-1 1000 meters at the 1996 Atlanta Olympics.

== Career ==
Robinson was born in Brisbane and grew up in Nambour on the Sunshine Coast of Queensland. He won the Cadet Malibu Board Race at the 1987 National Surf Lifesaving Championships as a junior surf lifesaver. The following year, he was invited to train with the Australian Olympic kayak squad. He went on to compete in five Summer Olympics.

At the 1992 Barcelona Olympics, Robinson won the gold medal in the K-1 1000m event, becoming Australia's first Olympic gold medalist in canoe/kayak. He defeated Knut Holmann, the reigning World Champion from Norway. After the race, Robinson reportedly experienced dehydration, delaying his doping analysis urine sample provision for several hours. At the 1996 Atlanta Olympics, he won bronze in the K-1 1000m event. At the 2004 Athens Olympics, Robinson and Nathan Baggaley won silver in the K-2 500 m event.

Robinson won four medals at the ICF Canoe Sprint World Championships: gold in the K-1 1000m in 1994, two silvers (K-1 1000m: 1995; K-4 10000m: 1991), and bronze in the K-2 500m in 1994.

Robinson received an OAM for his national championship record as a surf lifesaver (30 gold medals). He was a promising young rugby league footballer, but his sporting ambition was set from age 12, while watching the 1984 Los Angeles Games when he declared his intention to win an Olympic gold medal.

He competed in the Uncle Toby's Super Series (Professional Iron Man circuit) from 1989 to 1995, focusing on the board and ski legs. Due to his kayak training, his Iron Man circuit performance was affected by limited swimming and running training.

Robinson continued competing in surf lifesaving, representing Australia in 1993, 1995, and 1999. In 1999, he surpassed Trevor Hendy's record of 23 national titles. By the 2008 Beijing Olympics, he had 36 titles. In 2013, he was inducted into the Sport Australia Hall of Fame for his contributions to swimming, canoe/kayak, and surf lifesaving.

Robinson has won Australian titles in ski and board races, board rescue, board relay, double ski, ski relay, and Taplin relay. His 13 open-age individual titles are second only to Ky Hurst. He was inducted into the Australian Institute of Sport 'Best of the Best' in 2001. In 2017, he became head coach of Sunshine Beach Surf Life Saving Club after coaching water skiing there in 2016.

Robinson is a media professional, working as a commentator and sports presenter. He joined WIN Television in 1998 as a sports presenter on the Sunshine Coast edition of WIN News, having previously commentated on their "Maroochy Surf Classic" coverage.
