= Álvaro Koslowski =

Brazilian canoeist (born 1971)

Personal information
- Born: April 20, 1971 (age 55) Santa Tereza, Rio Grande do Sul, Brazil

Sport
- Sport: Canoeing
Medal record
Representing Brazil
Pan American Games
Bronze medal – third place	1995 Mar del Plata	K-2 1000m

Alvaro Acco Koslowski (born April 20, 1971) is a Brazilian sprint canoer who competed in the early 1990s. At the 1992 Summer Olympics in Barcelona, he was eliminated in the repechages of both the K-2 500 m event and the K-2 1000 m events.
