= Marc Weijzen =

Dutch sprint canoer (born 1964)

Marcus Hendrikus Guillaume Elisabeth "Marc" Weijzen (born 5 November 1964 in Maastricht) is a Dutch sprint canoeist who competed in the early 1990s. At the 1992 Summer Olympics in Barcelona, he was eliminated in the repechages of both the K-2 500 m and the K-2 1000 m event.
