= Vincent Olla =

French sprint canoer (born 1973)

Vincent Olla (born 4 February 1973) is a French sprint canoeist who competed in the mid-1990s. At the 1996 Summer Olympics in Atlanta, he was eliminated in the semifinals of the K-1 1000 m event. He was director of the French canoe sprint teams from 2012 to 2016.
