= James Block =

British sprint canoer

James Block (born 30 January 1968) is a British canoe sprinter who competed in the early 1990s.

== Early life ==
He lived on Gilbert Road in Cambridge, and gained A-levels in 1986 in Physics, and Further Maths. He attended the University of Nottingham.

He later lived in West Bridgford. In 1992 he worked for British Rail in research.

== Career ==
At the 1992 Summer Olympics in Barcelona, he was eliminated in the semifinals of the K-2 1000 m event.
