= Maciej Freimut =

Polish sprint canoeist

Medal record

Men's canoe sprint
| Event | 1st | 2nd | 3rd |
|---|---|---|---|
| Olympic Games | 0 | 1 | 0 |
| World Championships | 1 | 4 | 2 |
| European Championships | 0 | 1 | 1 |
| European Games | 0 | 0 | 0 |
| Total | 1 | 5 | 3 |

Olympic Games
| Silver medal – second place | 1992 Barcelona | K-2 500 m |

World Championships
| Gold medal – first place | 1994 Mexico City | K-2 200 m |
| Silver medal – second place | 1989 Plovdiv | K-4 1000 m |
| Silver medal – second place | 1990 Poznań | K-1 1000 m |
| Silver medal – second place | 1993 Copenhagen | K-2 500 m |
| Silver medal – second place | 1993 Copenhagen | K-4 10000 m |
| Bronze medal – third place | 1989 Plovdiv | K-2 500 m |
| Bronze medal – third place | 1995 Duisburg | K-2 500 m |

European Championships
| Silver medal – second place | 1997 Plovdiv | K2-500 m |
| Bronze medal – third place | 1997 Plovdiv | K2-200 m |

Maciej Freimut (born 24 February 1967) is a Polish sprint canoeist who competed from the late 1980s to the late 1990s. Competing in three Summer Olympics, he won a silver in the K-2 500 m event at Barcelona in 1992.

Freimut also won seven medals at the ICF Canoe Sprint World Championships with a gold (K-2 200 m: 1994), four silvers (K-1 1000 m: 1990, K-2 500 m: 1993, K-4 1000 m: 1989, K-4 10000 m: 1993), and two bronzes: K-2 500 m: 1989, 1995).

== European Championships Medal History ==
| Medal | Event | Year |
|---|---|---|
| Silver | K-2 500 m | 1997 |
| Bronze | K-2 200 m | 1997 |
