= Roberto Heinze Flamand =

Mexican canoeist (born 1972)

Roberto Heinze Flamand (born March 16, 1972) is a Mexican sprint canoer who competed in the early to mid-1990s. At the 1992 Summer Olympics in Barcelona, he was eliminated in the repechages of the K-1 500 m event. Four years later in Atlanta, Flamand was eliminated in the repechages of the K-2 500 m event.
