= Gonda Betrix =

South African equestrian rider

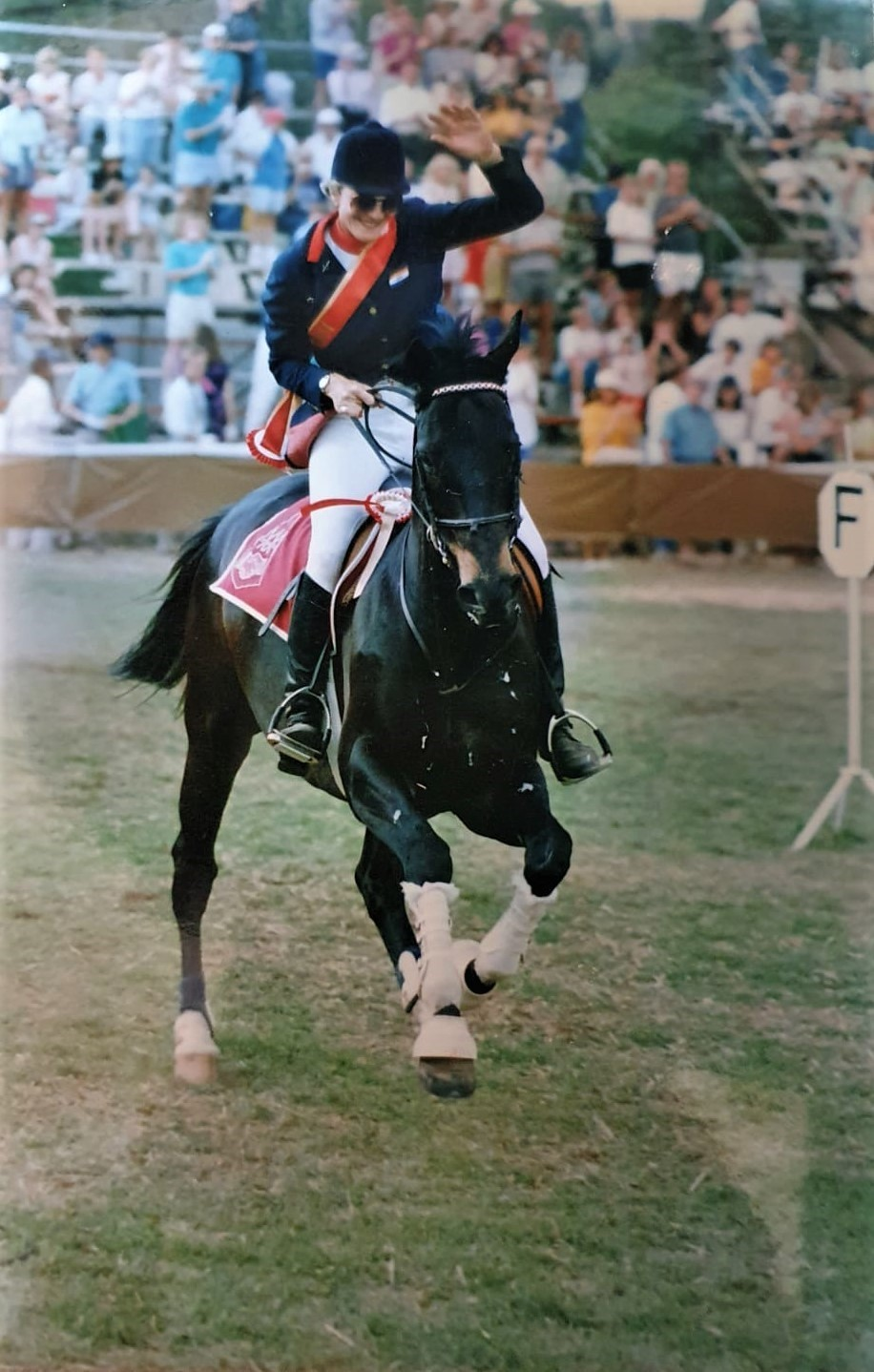
- Gonda Betrix on Watchfire SA Derby 1991
- Born: Gonda Joyce Butters; 28 August 1943 (age 83); South Africa
- Known for: Show Jumping, Equestrianism, South Africa at the 1992 Summer Olympics

Gonda Betrix (née. Butters) is a South African Equestrian Coach and a retired equestrian athlete. She is renowned for representing South Africa at the 1992 Summer Olympics in individual show jumping and for winning every major South African equestrian show jumping title. She is considered one of the best showjumpers of her era.

== Athletic career ==
Gonda was born in 1943 and started riding from the age of four. In 1951, at the age of eight, she won her first title as the Under 18 show Jumping Championship at the Western Province Agricultural Show.

During the first few years of her career, Gonda trained under Charlotte Stubbs. Charlotte Stubbs is considered one of the founders of South African Equitation, as she introduced the sport to South Africa in 1970. Upon Charlotte's recommendation, Gonda's parents took Gonda to Dublin, Ireland to train and study under the world-renowned coach Col. Joseph Hume-Dudgeon in 1955 (age 12). Col. Hume-Dudgeon was the Captain of the British Show jumping Team and recognised Gonda's potential. He wrote a letter to her parents stressing that provided Gonda was not pressurized, it was likely that she would achieve international standard within two years.

In 1957 (age 14), Gonda was granted a special licence by the South African National Equestrian Federation (SANEF) to compete as an adult. During her first year competing as an adult, Gonda competed at the 1958 Rand Easter Show where she broke the high jump record by clearing 6 ft 10 in (2.08 m) on her horse Gunga Din. She was runner up to Bob Grayston who cleared 7 feet (2.1 m). At the same show, Gonda became the first person to finish first (on her horse Oorskiet) and second (on her horse Gunga Din) in the Rand Easter Show Championship.

Later in 1958, Gonda was selected to join the only team of South African horses and riders to ever travel from South Africa to compete in Europe. She competed alongside Yvonne Peterson, Tony Lewis, George Myburgh, and Rory Donnellan. In Hanover, Germany, the team was placed second and in Rotterdam, Holland they won the international team competition. She earned her Junior Springbok colours during this time for representing South Africa whilst being under the age of 18. In the same year, Gonda competed under special licence to ride as an adult in the UK – winning the South of England Championship, achieving runner up at the British National Championship, and winning the Four Area International Olympic Trials

The World Trophy, originally known as the Helms Award, was an annual sporting award established by the Helms Athletic Foundation in 1939 to honour the foremost amateur athlete of each continent of the world, including Africa, Asia, Australia, Europe, North America, and South America. Even though the Foundation was established in 1936, the awards date back to 1896, the year of the first Summer Olympics. Gonda was awarded the Helms Award in 1959.

In 1962, Gonda was awarded full Springbok colours at the age of 19. Between 1961 and 1991, Gonda won numerous competitions, including the annual South African Championships (10 times), the South African Derby (6 times), Outdoor Grand Prix (twice), amongst others. To date, Gonda is the only rider to ever win the SA Championships 10 times and the SA Derby 6 times. Of the 6 times that Gonda won the SA Derby, she was the only clear round in 4 of them.

In 1974, Gonda was invited to compete at the Ladies Individual International Championship in Washington D.C. At this prestigious competition, Gonda competed against 4 other internationally acclaimed female equestrian athletes including the United States Olympic gold medallist Kathryn Kusner. Gonda won this competition which forged her reputation as the best female equestrian athlete at the time.

The South African Sport Merit Award was awarded to Gonda in 1973, 1979 and 1980. She was also awarded the President's Award in 1973.

It was Gonda's lifelong ambition to compete at the Olympics, but it was not to be until the 1992 Olympic Games. Gonda was selected to represent South Africa at the 1992 Olympic Games in Barcelona. She competed on a leased horse Tommy 29 under the banner of Paul Schockemöhle stable based in Germany.

In 1994, Gonda took her horse Watchfire to Europe with the intention of competing him at the 1996 Olympics in Atlanta. During the duo's time in Europe, they won the Swiss Ladies Championship at the Geneva Indoor International Horse Show in 1995. The last competition that Gonda competed in was the Wolfsburg Grand Prix in 1995. Shortly thereafter, Watchfire picked up a tragic injury which ended the plan to compete at the 1996 Olympics. Gonda retired from riding in 1995 and started focusing on her coaching career in 1996.

Gonda was listed as a South African Sports Legend in 2017 and inducted into the South African Sport Hall of Fame in 2006.

== Coaching career ==
Since 1995, Gonda has not actively ridden as she is based in Cape Town and regularly travels between Johannesburg and Cape Town to coach. Gonda has coached many South African equestrian athletes who have had many successful results. Nicole Horwood and Nicola Sime, who have been trained by Gonda for 25 years, have both won the South African Championships, South African Derby, and South African Outdoor Grand Prix on numerous occasions.

=== Published books ===
In 1992, she wrote a part-autobiography, part training manual with Julia Attwood-Wheeler. Betrix, Gonda; Attwood-Wheeler, Julia (1992). Jumping to Success. Southern Book Publishers. ISBN 1868122190.
