= René Kučera =

Czech sprint canoer (born 1972)

René Kučera (born 17 September 1972 in Prague) is a Czech sprint canoer. He competed for Czechoslovakia in 1992 Summer Olympics and for the Czech Republic in 1996 Summer Olympics. He earned is best finish of seventh in the K-2 1000 m event in 1992 Summer Olympics.
