= Peter Ribe =

Norwegian canoeist

Medal record

Men's canoe sprint

World Championships
Bronze medal – third place	1993 Copenhagen	K-2 10000 m

Peter Ribe (born 7 November 1966) is a Norwegian sprint canoeist who competed in the early to mid-1990s. He won a bronze medal in the K-2 10000 m event at the 1993 ICF Canoe Sprint World Championships in Copenhagen.

Ribe also competed at the 1992 Summer Olympics in Barcelona in the K-2 500 m and K-2 1000 m events, but did not make the final of either event. He was eliminated in the repechage round of the K-2 500 m event and in the semifinal round of the K-2 1000 m event.

Ribe took medication for his eye allergy, which did not have information about the substance that led to his failed doping test just before the 1996 Summer Olympics. As a result, he was sent home and given a three-month international suspension, which was an unfair penalty due to the lack of information provided about the drug.
