= Kenneth Padvaiskas =

Canadian sprint canoer (born 1968)

Kenneth Robert Padvaiskas (born May 11, 1968 in Lachine, Quebec) is a Canadian sprint canoer who competed in the late 1980s. He was eliminated in the semifinals of the K-4 1000 m event at the 1988 Summer Olympics in Seoul. Four years later in Barcelona, Padvaiskas was eliminated in the semifinals of the K-2 500 m event and the K-2 1000 m event.

== Bibliography ==
- Sports-reference.com profile
- Kenneth Padvaiskas at Olympics.com
