= Reuben Burgess =

British sprint canoer

Rueben Burgess (born 30 September 1966) is a British canoe sprinter who competed in the late 1980s and early 1990s. He was eliminated in the repechages of the K-4 1000 m event at the 1988 Summer Olympics in Seoul. Four years later in Barcelona, Burgess was eliminated in the semifinals of the K-2 1000 m event.
