= Graham Burns =

British sprint and marathon canoeist

Medal record

Men's canoe marathon

Representing United Kingdom

Canoe Marathon World Championships
Silver medal – second place	1988 Nottingham	K-2
Silver medal – second place	1990 Copenhagen	K-2

Graham Burns (born 22 August 1966) is a British sprint and marathon canoeist who competed in the early 1990s.

== Early life ==
In 1992 he was a welder from Egham.

== Career ==
At the 1992 Summer Olympics in Barcelona, he was eliminated in the repechages of the K-1 1000 m event.
