= Pär Lindén =

Swedish canoeist (born 1966)

Pär Lindén (born July 20, 1966) is a Swedish sprint canoer who competed in the early 1990s. At the 1992 Summer Olympics in Barcelona, he was disqualified in the repechages of the K-1 1000 m event.

He is from Nyköpings Kanotklubb.
