= 1995 Canoe Marathon European Championships =

The 1995 Canoe Marathon European Championships were the first edition of the Canoe Marathon European Championships, which took place on 20–21 May 1995 in Murcia, Spain. The races were held in the Mar Menor lagoon, near Los Alcázares. The competition consisted of five events, four in kayak (men and women's K-1 and K-2) and one in canoe (men's C-1), all of which were contested in a distance of 30 kilometers.

== Medal overview ==
=== Medalists ===
Event	Gold	Time	Silver	Time	Bronze	Time
Men's C-1	Gábor Kolozsvári (HUN)	2:40:27.81	Béla Jakus (HUN)	2:40:31.13	Jan Klimek (CZE)	2:46.47.56
Men's K-1	Edwin de Nijs (NED)	2:06:59.54	Tonny Benschop (NED)	2:08:34.02	István Salga (HUN)	2:09.25.14
Men's K-2	Portugal (POR); José da Silva; João Gomes	1:56:21.43	Netherlands (NED); Rick Daman; Dolph Te Linde	2:00:16.96	Slovakia (SVK); Martin Martiny; Richard Opalka	2:01.10.87
Women's K-1	Andrea Pitz (HUN)	2:18:31.78	Nicole Bulk (NED)	2:22:00.80	Kornélia Szonda (HUN)	2:24.01.98
Women's K-2	Hungary (HUN); Ágnes Erdődi; Andrea Bíró	2:16:02.64	Hungary (HUN); Katalin Suhaj; Nóra Egedy	2:25:20.65	Portugal (POR); Susana Ferreira; Luísa Azevedo	2:28.07.46

=== Medal table ===
Rank	Nation	Gold	Silver	Bronze	Total
1	Hungary	3	2	2	7
2	Netherlands	1	3	0	4
3	Portugal	1	0	1	2
4	Czech Republic	0	0	1	1
4	Slovakia	0	0	1	1
Totals (5 entries)		5	5	5	15
