= Chung Chi Lok =

Hong Kong sprint canoer

Personal information
- Native name: 鍾志樂
- National team: Hong Kong
- Born: 23 January 1972 (age 53)

Chinese name
- Traditional Chinese: 鍾志樂
- Simplified Chinese: 钟志乐
Transcriptions
Standard Mandarin
- Hanyu Pinyin: Zhōng Zhìlè
Yue: Cantonese
- Jyutping: Zung^{1} Zi^{3}lok^{6}

Arnold Chung Chi Lok (Note: These sources verify Chung's English name as being Arnold) (traditional Chinese: 鍾志樂; simplified Chinese: 钟志乐; born 23 January 1972) is a Hong Kong sprint canoer who competed in the early 1990s. At the 1992 Summer Olympics in Barcelona, he was eliminated in the repechages of both the K-2 500 m and the K-2 1000 m event.

== Biography ==
Chung was born on 23 January 1972. His maternal grandfather lived on the water. In his youth, Chung participated in the Sea Scouts and received the Canoe Medal of Honor (Chinese: 獨木舟榮譽獎) and won at the Hong Kong Youth Competition (Chinese: 香港青年比賽). Zhong competed as a professional athlete for four years. He became a member of the Hong Kong national rowing team in 1990 and competed in the Olympics and the Asian Games. At the 1994 Asian Games, he received fourth place in rowing at a four-person rowing event, failing to medal at 0.35 seconds behind the third-place finishers. He received a nomination from the Hongkong Canoe Union for the Coca-Cola Sports Stars Awards, an award the South China Morning Post called "prestigious". Chung discontinued canoeing after he participated in the double kayak competition 1992 Summer Olympics, finding the sport to be lacking institutional support. In an interview with the South China Morning Post, he said, "I still love canoeing but, unfortunately, the sport does not have the attention and support of Hongkong's highest sporting authorities like the Sports Development Board and the Hongkong Sports Institute. There is no full-time coach for canoeing and neither can the athletes get scholarships, so there is little hope that the sport can be developed properly."

Chung switched his focus to rowing in November 1992, saying, "But it is entirely different in rowing as they have top-level full-time coaches and I can stay in at the rowing centre, giving me easy access to the training facilities." At the Hong Kong Sports Institute, he underwent a battery of physiological exams. Impressed with how Chung performed, Chris Perry, the Hong Kong head rowing coach, gave Chung a scholarship. At 6:00am every day, Chung practiced in Sha Tin at Shing Mun River's rowing facility. In the evenings, he practiced rowing thrice weekly and weightlifting twice weekly. Describing his training schedule and life in 1994, Chung said, "I seldom go out. I go home every two weeks. My life is quite monotonous, but it's worth it. I want to see results from it." In 1994, Chung lamented how he was "given so little" for his grant, saying, "but rowing is my interest and I want to do it when I am young. You can't expect to be heavily subsidised in Hong Kong."

Since the government provided little funding to athletes, Zhong stopped being a professional athlete so that he could make a living. He founded a sporting goods company in 1996 in which he handled both the receiving and delivery of goods. In 2005, after having achieved a stable career, Chung established a dragon boat team with friends. They took part in various Hong Kong competitions. He accepted an invitation to a Hong Kong Dragon Boat Association member. Subsequently, Chung became its head coach, leading it to compete in the 2010 Asian Games. In preparation for the competition, he organised 40 days of training for the team. The Oriental Daily said that in 2010, he mentored a group of "marginalized youths who were abandoned by society to be back on the right track" by teaching them youth dragon boat sports. The youth team he coached competed in Malaysia and won the International Dragon Boat Race's youth team division. Articles published in 2022 described Chung as the chairman of the Hong Kong China Dragon Boat Association. He submitted a bid for Hong Kong to be the host of the 2020 Asian Dragon Boat Championships but it got cancelled owing the COVID-19 pandemic.
