= Zvonimir Krznarić =

Croatian canoeist (born 1972)

Zvonimir Krznarić (born June 4, 1972) is a Croatian sprint canoer who competed in the early 1990s. At the 1992 Summer Olympics in Barcelona, he was eliminated in the repechages of both the K-1 500 m and the K-1 1000 m events.
