= Park Ki-jung =

South Korean canoeist

Personal information
- Born: May 13, 1970 (age 56)
Medal record
Men's canoe sprint
Representing South Korea
Asian Games
Silver medal – second place	1990 Beijing	K-4 1000 m
Bronze medal – third place	1990 Beijing	K-4 500 m

Park Ki-Jung (born May 13, 1970) is a South Korean sprint canoer who competed in the early 1990s. At the 1992 Summer Olympics in Barcelona, he was eliminated in the repechages of both the K-1 1000 m and the K-2 500 m events, and did not finish in the heats of the K-2 1000 m event.
