= Florintin Tataru =

Romanian sprint canoer (born 1971)

Florintin Tataru (born February 3, 1971) is a Romanian sprint canoer who competed in the early 1990s. At the 1992 Summer Olympics in Barcelona, he was eliminated in the semifinals of the K-2 1000 m event.
