= Roberto Liberato =

Swiss sprint canoer (born 1966)

Roberto Liberato (born September 19, 1965) is a Swiss sprint canoer who competed in the early 1990s. At the 1992 Summer Olympics in Barcelona, he finished sixth the K-1 500 m event while being eliminated in the semifinals of the K-1 1000 m event.
