= Artūras Vieta =

Lithuanian sprint canoeist (born 1961)

Medal record

Men's canoe sprint

Representing Soviet Union

World Championships
Gold medal – first place	1987 Duisburg	K-4 500 m
Gold medal – first place	1989 Plovdiv	K-4 10000 m
Gold medal – first place	1990 Poznań	K-4 10000 m
Silver medal – second place	1983 Tampere	K-1 1000 m
Silver medal – second place	1983 Tampere	K-4 500 m
Silver medal – second place	1985 Mechelen	K-4 1000 m
Silver medal – second place	1989 Plovdiv	K-2 1000 m
Silver medal – second place	1990 Poznań	K-2 1000 m
Bronze medal – third place	1983 Tampere	K-4 1000 m
Bronze medal – third place	1987 Duisburg	K-4 1000 m

Artūras Vieta (born May 31, 1961) is a Lithuanian sprint canoeist, born in Šiauliai. He won ten medals at the ICF Canoe Sprint World Championships with three golds (K-4 500 m: 1987, K-4 10000 m: 1989, 1990), three silvers (K-1 1000 m: 1983, K-2 1000 m: 1989, 1990; K-4 500 m: 1983, K-4 1000 m: 1985), and two bronzes (K-4 1000 m: 1985, 1987). At the 1992 Summer Olympics in Barcelona, he competed for Lithuania and finished ninth in both the K-1 500 m and the K-1 1000 m events.
