= Andrey Safaryan =

Kazakhstani canoeist

Andrey Safaryan (born August 31, 1966) is a Kazakhstani sprint canoer of Armenian descent who competed in the mid-1990s. At the 1996 Summer Olympics in Atlanta, he was eliminated in the repechages of the K-1 1000 m event and the semifinals of the K-4 1000 m event. He was born in Guryev.
