= Luk Kwok Sun =

Hong Kong sprint canoeist

Luk Kwok Sun (born August 13, 1960) is a Hong Kong sprint canoer who competed in the late 1980s and early 1990s. At the 1988 Summer Olympics in Seoul, he was eliminated in the repechages of the K-1 1000 m event. Four years later in Barcelona, Luk was eliminated in the repechages of both the K-2 500 m and the K-2 1000 m events.
