= Conor Holmes =

Irish canoeist

Medal record

Men's canoe marathon

Representing Ireland

Canoe Marathon World Championships
| Silver medal – second place | 1998 Cape Town | K-2 marathon |

Conor Holmes (born 21 May 1967) is an Irish canoe sprinter and marathon canoeist who competed in the early 1990s. At the 1992 Summer Olympics in Barcelona, he was eliminated in the repechages of both the K-2 500 m and the K-2 1000 m events.
