= Alan Carey (canoeist) =

Irish canoeist

Alan Carey (born 11 February 1968) is an Irish canoe sprinter who competed in the late 1980s and early 1990s. At the 1988 Summer Olympics in Seoul, he was eliminated in the semifinals of the K-2 500 m event. Four years later, at the 1992 Summer Olympics, Carey was eliminated in the repechages of both the K-2 500 m and the K-2 1000 m events.
