= Bart Stalmans =

Belgian canoeist

Bart Stalmans (born 5 December 1962 in Neerpelt) is a Belgian canoe sprinter who competed in the early 1990s. At the 1992 Summer Olympics in Barcelona, he was eliminated in the semifinals of the K-2 1000 m and the repechages of the K-2 500 m event.
