= Agustín Calderon =

Spanish sprint canoer (born 1972)

Agustín Calderón Díez (Note: In this Spanish name, the first or paternal surname is Calderón and the second or maternal family name is Díez.) (born 27 February 1972 in Santander, Cantabria) is a Spanish sprint canoeist who competed in the mid-1990s. At the 1996 Summer Olympics in Atlanta, he finished fifth the K-1 1000 m event.
