= Srđan Marilović =

Serbian canoeist

Srđan Marilović (Serbian: Срђан Мариловић, November 5, 1967 - August 4, 2013) was a Serbian sprint canoer who competed as an Independent Olympic Participant at the 1992 Summer Olympics in Barcelona. He was eliminated in the repechages of both the K-1 1000 m and the K-2 1000 m events.
