= Óscar García (canoeist) =

Spanish canoeist (born 1972)

Óscar García (born 12 January 1972) is a Spanish sprint canoer who competed in the early 1990s. At the 1992 Summer Olympics in Barcelona, he was eliminated in the semifinals of the K-1 1000 m event.
