= John MacDonald (canoeist) =

New Zealand canoeist

John MacDonald (born 9 December 1965) is a New Zealand sprint canoeist who competed in the late 1980s and early 1990s. He was eliminated in the semifinals of the K-4 1000 m event at the 1988 Summer Olympics in Seoul. Four years later in Barcelona, he was eliminated in the semifinals of both the K-1 500 m and K-1 1000 m events.
