= Kang Ki-jin =

South Korean canoeist

Personal information
- Born: November 16, 1972 (age 53)
Medal record
Men's canoe sprint
Representing South Korea
Asian Games
Bronze medal – third place	1994 Hiroshima	K-4 500 m
Bronze medal – third place	1994 Hiroshima	K-4 1000 m

Kang Ki-Jin (강기진, born November 16, 1972) is a South Korean sprint canoer who competed in the early 1990s. At the 1992 Summer Olympics in Barcelona, he was eliminated in the repechage of the K-1 500 m event and the heats of the K-4 1000 m event.
