= Lutz Liwowski =

German canoeist

Medal record

Men's canoe sprint

World Championships
Gold medal – first place	1998 Szeged	K-1 1000 m
Gold medal – first place	1999 Milan	K-1 1000 m
Bronze medal – third place	1995 Duisburg	K-1 1000 m
Bronze medal – third place	1998 Szeged	K-1 500 m
Bronze medal – third place	2001 Poznań	K-1 1000 m

Lutz Liwowski (born 30 July 1967) is a German sprint canoeist, born in Düsseldorf, who competed from the mid-1990s to the early 2000s (decade). He won five medals at the ICF Canoe Sprint World Championships with two golds (K-1 1000 m: 1998, 1999) and three bronzes (K-1 500 m: 1998, K-1 1000 m: 1995, 2001).

Liwowski also competed in two Summer Olympics, earning his best finish of fourth in the K-1 1000 m event at Atlanta in 1996.
