= Sergey Kalesnik =

Medal record

Men's canoe sprint

Representing Soviet Union

World Championships
Gold medal – first place	1990 Poznań	K-1 500 m
Gold medal – first place	1990 Poznań	K-2 500 m
Silver medal – second place	1989 Plovdiv	K-2 500 m
Silver medal – second place	1990 Poznań	K-4 1000 m

Representing Belarus

World Championships
Gold medal – first place	1994 Mexico City	K-1 200 m
Silver medal – second place	1995 Duisburg	K-1 200 m

Sergey Kalesnik (born January 28, 1970, in Gomel, Byelorussian SSR) is a Soviet-born Belarusian sprint canoeist who competed from the late 1980s to the late 1990s. He won six medals at the ICF Canoe Sprint World Championships with three golds (K-1 200 m: 1994, K-1 500 m: 1990, K-2 500 m: 1990) and three silvers (K-1 200 m: 1995, K-2 500 m: 1989, K-4 1000 m: 1990).

Kalesnik also competed in three Summer Olympics under three different nations. At the 1988 Summer Olympics in Seoul, he was eliminated in the semifinals of the K-2 1000 m event for the Soviet Union. Competing for the Unified Team at the 1992 Summer Olympics in Barcelona, Kalesnik finished fifth in the K-2 500 m and ninth in the K-2 1000 m events. Finally competing for Belarus at the 1996 Summer Olympics in Atlanta, Kalesnik was eliminated in the semifinal round of the K-1 500 m event.
