= Erik Gervais =

Canadian canoeist (born 1973)

Erik Gervais (born January 24, 1973) is a Canadian sprint canoer who competed in the mid-1990s. At the 1996 Summer Olympics in Atlanta, he was eliminated in the repechages of the K-1 1000 m event.
