= Abdul Razak (canoeist) =

Indonesian canoeist

Personal information
- Born: October 10, 1964 (age 61)
- Height: 163 cm (5 ft 4 in)
- Weight: 59 kg (130 lb)
Medal record
Men's canoe sprint
Representing Indonesia
Asian Games
Bronze medal – third place	1990 Beijing	K-2 1000 m

Abdul Razak (born October 10, 1964) is an Indonesian sprint canoer who competed in the early 1990s. At the 1992 Summer Olympics in Barcelona, he was eliminated in the repechages of both the K-2 500 m and the K-2 1000 m events.
