= Jens Stegemann =

German canoeist (born 1971)

Medal record

Men's canoe marathon

Representing West Germany

Canoe Marathon World Championships
Bronze medal – third place	1990 Copenhagen	K-2

Jens Stegemann (born November 22, 1971) is a German sprint and marathon canoeist who competed in the late 1980s and early 1990s. He was born in Berlin. In 1989 he was junior world champion at Men's K-4 1000m. Together with Olaf Scheu, he won the bronze medal in the K2 at the Canoe Marathon World Championships in Copenhagen. At the 1992 Summer Olympics in Barcelona, he achieved the semifinal of the K-1 1000 m event. He ended his career by starting medical school in 1993.
