= Jason Rusu =

Canadian canoeist

Jason David Rusu (born September 7, 1969 in Saskatoon, Saskatchewan) is a Canadian sprint canoer who competed in the early 1990s. At the 1992 Summer Olympics in Barcelona, he was eliminated in the semifinals of both the K-2 500 m and the K-2 1000 m events.
