= Andrzej Gajewski (canoeist) =

Polish canoeist

Personal information
- Born: 29 August 1964 (age 61) Śrem, Poland

Sport
- Sport: Canoe sprint
Medal record
Representing Poland
World Championships
Silver medal – second place	1990 Poznań	K-4 10000 m
Bronze medal – third place	1989 Plovdiv	K-4 10000 m
Summer Universiade
Gold medal – first place	1987 Zagreb	K-4 500 m

Andrzej Gajewski (born 29 August 1964) is a Polish sprint canoeist who competed from the late 1980s to the mid-1990s. He won two medals in the K-4 10000 m event at the ICF Canoe Sprint World Championships with a silver in 1990 and a bronze in 1989.

Gajewski also finished sixth in the K-1 1000 m event at the 1996 Summer Olympics in Atlanta.
