= Thomas Roander =

Norwegian sprint canoer (born 1969)

Thomas Roander (born July 31, 1969) is a Norwegian sprint canoer who competed in the early to mid-1990s. At the 1992 Summer Olympics in Barcelona, he was eliminated in the repechages of the K-2 500 m event and the semifinals of the K-2 1000 m event. Four years later in Atlanta, Roander was eliminated in the semifinals of the K-4 1000 m event.
