= Paolo Luschi =

Italian canoeist (born 1970)

Paolo Luschi (born July 16, 1970 in Livorno) is an Italian sprint canoer who competed in the early 1990s. At the 1992 Summer Olympics in Barcelona, he finished fifth in the K-2 1000 m event.
