= Antoon De Brauwer =

Belgian canoeist

Antoon De Brauwer (Hasselt, 11 February 1964) is a Belgian canoe sprinter who competed from the mid-1980s to the early 1990s. At the 1984 Summer Olympics in Los Angeles, he was eliminated in the semifinals of both the K-1 500 m and K-1 1000 m events. Eight years later in Barcelona, De Brauwer was eliminated in the semifinals of the K-2 1000 m event and the repechages of the K-2 500 m event.
