= Anatoly Tyurin =

Uzbek sprint canoer (born 1968)

Personal information
- Born: July 1, 1968 (age 58) Vologda, Russian SFSR
- Height: 191 cm (6 ft 3 in)
- Weight: 87 kg (192 lb)
Medal record
Men's canoe sprint
Representing Uzbekistan
Asian Games
| Gold medal – first place | 1994 Hiroshima | K-4 1000 m |
| Silver medal – second place | 1994 Hiroshima | K-4 500 m |

Anatoly Tyurin (Russian: Анатолий Тюрин, born July 1, 1968, in Vologda, Russian SFSR) is an Uzbek sprint canoer who competed in the early to mid-1990s. Competing for the Unified Team, he was eliminated in the semifinals of the K-2 1000 m event at the 1992 Summer Olympics in Barcelona. Four years later in Atlanta, Kireyev was eliminated in the semifinals of the K-4 1000 m event while competing for Uzbekistan.
