= Žarko Vekić =

Serbian sprint canoer

Žarko Vekić (Serbian: Жарко Векић, born 1 May 1967) is a Serbian sprint canoeist who competed as an Independent Olympic Participant at the 1992 Summer Olympics in Barcelona. He was eliminated in the repechages of both the K-1 500 m and the K-2 1000 m events.

In the K-1 500 meters, Vekić finished 6th in his heat, and then 6th again in Repechage 1, where only the top 4 advanced to the semifinals.
