= Enrique Leite =

Uruguayan canoeist

Personal information
- Born: December 12, 1963 (age 62) Villa del Cerro, Montevideo, Uruguay
Medal record
Representing Uruguay
South American Games
Gold medal – first place	1982 Rosario	400m individual medley
Gold medal – first place	1982 Rosario	200m breaststroke
Silver medal – second place	1981 Medellin	400m individual medley
Bronze medal – third place	1981 Medellin	200m breaststroke
Bronze medal – third place	1981 Medellin	200m individual medley
South American Swimming Championships
Gold medal – first place	1982 La Paz	400m individual medley
Gold medal – first place	1982 La Paz	200m breaststroke
Silver medal – second place	1982 La Paz	200m individual medley
Bronze medal – third place	1984 Rio de Janeiro	400m individual medley

Enrique Leite (born December 12, 1963) is a physical education teacher, swimming coach, lifeguard and a Uruguayan sprint canoeist who competed in the early 1990s. At the 1992 Summer Olympics in Barcelona, he was eliminated in the repechages of both the K-1 500 m and the K-1 1000 m events.

== Swimming career ==
=== South American Championships ===
In 1979, he won a bronze medal in the South American Swimming Championship in São Paulo, Brazil.

For the 1982 South American Swimming Championship in La Paz, Bolivia, he became the first Uruguayan male swimmer in obtaining a gold medal for Uruguay: he gold in the 400m individual medley and 200m breaststroke, a silver for 200m individual medley with a final count of seven medals including the Uruguayan team relays.

In 1984, South American Swimming Championship in Rio de Janeiro, Brazil, he won bronze for the 400m individual medley.

In 1986, he was a water polo player for the Uruguay National Team at the South American Water Polo Championship in Santiago, Chile.

=== South American Games ===
As a Uruguayan Team swimmer participated in South American Games in Buenos Aires 1980, Medellìn 1981 (silver in the 400m individual medley and 200m breaststroke, and bronze in the 200m individual medley among other Uruguay relays medals.

In 1982 was a member of the Uruguayan National Swimming team for the South American Games in Rosario, Argentina where was gold for the 400m individual medley and 200m breaststroke among other medals obtained individually and as a member of the Uruguay relays team.

=== Pan American Games ===
Participated as a swimmer for the Uruguay national team at the 1979 Pan American Games and the 1983 Pan American Games in Caracas, Venezuela.

=== World Championships ===
Participated in the 1982 World Aquatics Championships in Guayaquil, Ecuador.

=== Olympics ===
In 1980, was named to be a member of the Uruguayan national swimming team for the Moscow Olympics but finally Uruguay adhered to the Boycott and did not participate in those games.

== Canoeing career ==
In 1988 while studying physical education, started practicing flat water kayaking on his brother's recommendation. As a paddler, was part of the Uruguayan National Canoeing team for the World Canoeing Championship in Poznan, Poland 1990 and Paris 1991 as well as for the Pre-Olympics at Barcelona in 1991.

In 1991 was a member of the Uruguayan National Canoeing Team for the 1991 Pan American Games in La Habana, Cuba, where he placed fifth for the K1-1000m, which qualified him to be in the 1992 Olympics in Barcelona.

== Personal life ==
Enrique Leite is the only athlete in Uruguay in making the national team for Pan American Games or Olympics in two different sport disciplines, swimming and canoeing.

As a swimming coach he had taken the Carrasco Lawn Tennis Club Summer Swimming team to the first place in 1984.

In 2008 and 2009 Optimist South American Championships held in Paracas- Perú and Salinas- Ecuador he was the Team Leader of the Uruguayan National Optimist Team
