= Simon Parsons =

British sprint canoer (born 1969)

Simon Parsons (born 3 May 1969) is a British canoe sprinter, who competed in the early 1990s.

== Early life ==
He attended Royal Grammar School Worcester. He trained at Fladbury Canoe and Kayak Club, with Stephen and Andrew Train.

He lived at Drakes Broughton. He had a serious cancer operation in 1988. In 1992 he worked for the Inland Revenue.

== Career ==
At the 1992 Summer Olympics in Barcelona, he was eliminated in the repechages of the K-1 500 m event.
