= Bruno Dreossi =

Italian sprint canoeist (born 1964)

Personal information
- Nationality: Italian
- Born: 11 July 1964 (age 62) Monfalcone, Italy

Sport
- Sport: Canoeing and kayaking
- Club: Fiamme Gialle
Medal record
Olympic Games
| Bronze medal – third place | 1992 Barcelona | K-2 500 m |

Bruno Dreossi (born 11 July 1964) is an Italian canoe sprinter who competed from the mid-1980s to the early 1990s. Competing in two Summer Olympics, he won a bronze medal in the K-2 500 m event at Barcelona in 1992.
