= Abdul Karim (canoeist) =

Indonesian canoeist

Abdul Karim (born May 10, 1967) is an Indonesian sprint canoer who competed in the early 1990s. At the 1992 Summer Olympics in Barcelona, he was eliminated in the repechages of both the K-2 500 m and the K-2 1000 m events.
