= José da Silva (canoeist) =

Portuguese canoeist

Medal record

Representing Portugal

Men's canoe sprint

Canoe Sprint World Championships
Silver medal – second place	1989 Dartmouth, Canada	K-4 500 m (Junior)

Men's canoe marathon

1995 Canoe Marathon European Championships
Gold medal – first place	1995 Murcia	K-2 marathon

José António Silva (born October 27, 1971) is a Portuguese sprint and marathon canoer who competed in the early 1990s. At the 1992 Summer Olympics in Barcelona, he was eliminated in the semifinals of both the K-2 500 m and the K-2 1000 m events.

José António, together with João Gomes, became the first European Champions in K2 at 1995 Canoe Marathon European Championships and the first Portuguese to win the International Sella River Descent, in Ribadesella (Asturias) also in 1995.

== See also ==
- 1995 Canoe Marathon European Championships
