= Jefferson Lacerda =

Brazilian canoeist

Jefferson Bispo Lacerda (born January 28, 1962) is a Brazilian sprint canoer who competed in the early 1990s. At the 1992 Summer Olympics in Barcelona, he was eliminated in the repechages of both the K-2 500 m event and the K-2 1000 m events.

Jefferson was instrumental in giving visibility to Ubaitaba's competitive canoeing and kayaking.
