= Tom Krantz =

Swedish canoeist

Medal record

Men's canoe marathon

Representing Sweden

Canoe Marathon World Championships
Silver medal – second place	1996 Vaxholm	K-2

Tom Krantz (born 15 July 1971) is a Swedish sprint and marathon canoeist who competed in the mid-1990s. At the 1996 Summer Olympics, he was eliminated in the repechages of both the K-1 500 m and the K-1 1000 m events.
