= Darryl Cronje =

South African swimmer

Personal information
- Born: 4 August 1967 (age 58) Durban, South Africa

Sport
- Sport: Swimming

Darryl Cronje (born 4 August 1967) is a South African swimmer. He competed in three events at the 1992 Summer Olympics.
