= Juan José Roman =

Spanish canoeist

Medal record

Men's canoe sprint

World Championships
Gold medal – first place	1991 Paris	K-2 500 m
Silver medal – second place	1991 Paris	K-2 1000 m
Bronze medal – third place	1993 Copenhagen	K-2 500 m

Juan José Román Mangas (born December 23, 1962) is a Spanish sprint canoer who competed from the late 1980s to the mid-1990s. He won a complete set of medals at the ICF Canoe Sprint World Championships with a gold (K-2 500 m: 1991), a silver (K-2 1000 m: 1991), and a bronze (K-2 500 m: 1993).

Román also competed in four Summer Olympics, earning his best finish of fourth in the K-2 500 m event at Barcelona in 1992.

As of 2009, Román is President of the Royal Spanish Canoe Federation and organizing committee chair of the 2009 ICF Canoe Slalom World Championships held in La Seu d'Urgell, Spain.
