= Uncle Tobys Super Series =

Australian professional Iron Man circuit

Uncle Tobys Super Series logo

The Uncle Tobys Super Series was a professional Australian Iron Man circuit that ran from 1989 to 2001.

It was televised on Network 10.

== History ==
=== The Beginning ===
In 1984, The Coolangatta Gold became the first ever professional Iron Man race with $20,000 prize money. Guy Leech won the race in its inaugural year and also the following year before The SLSA decided to discontinue the event.

From 1986 the SLSA created a semi-professional Iron Man circuit which was called the Kelloggs Nutri-Grain Iron Man Grand Prix. Although this series did give competitors a chance to win some prizemoney, it meant that the average competitor would struggle to make a living from the sport. Several competitors had ideas for a full professional sport and expressed their ideas to the SLSA however the SLSA were not interested and the tension began to rise eventually leading to 12 competitors forming a breakaway series with rival breakfast cereal Uncle Tobys as main sponsor. The series was designed to attract more public interest and higher television ratings for what was a relatively new sport at the time.

The SLSA were totally against the Uncle Tobys Super Series and threatened the competitors with life bans. There was great tension between SLSA and the organisers especially considering that the biggest names in the series were also the biggest names in Surf Life Saving. In many ways it was similar to the World Series Cricket situation that Australia faced in the late 1970s. Both sports were facing a breakaway series which was designed for television and to attract advertising while the formal competition was to continue despite losing its main drawcards.

=== Initial Success ===
The first race was held in October 1989 which was to be a new version of The Coolangatta Gold which was now renamed The Gold Coast Gold. Guy Leech comfortably won the race making him undefeated over the race from 3 attempts. The entire race was televised live and finished at sunset. Interest in the series was developing rapidly and television ratings were at an acceptable level.

=== 1989-1994: Cereal wars and Trevor Hendy's domination ===
As the first season progressed, Trevor Hendy and Guy Leech were the two main contenders for overall victory with Hendy coming out on top. While this was happening, the Nutri-Grain/SLSA series was also taking place but was now suffering without its best competitors. Almost every Nutri-Grain race was won by Darren Mercer and the majority of competitors were aspiring to join the more elite and more lucrative Uncle Tobys series.

The 1990/91 season was also won by Hendy with young competitors Guy Andrews and Jon Robinson finishing in second and third place respectively. The first race of the season was held in Hawaii making it the first overseas race. By now the series was beginning to make its presence felt and the competition was fierce, so much that Grant Kenny, who was a four-time Australian Iron Man champion, could only manage to finish as high as 17th in the overall series.

1991/92 was another successful year for the series and another successful year for Trevor Hendy. Despite being sick and missing the first race, Hendy recovered to win the series with Guy Andrews coming second again and Guy Leech in third. The season saw the Uncle Tobys series hold a prime-time race televised live at 6pm on a Friday night from Manly. It turned out to be a great ratings grabber with the sports two biggest names (Hendy and Leech) battling it out with Hendy narrowly winning in a sprint finish. The season also saw the emergence of talented Iron Man Jonathan Crowe who won his first Uncle Tobys race in round one in the Gold Coast Gold. The tragedy of the season was Jon Robinson being injured in a motorbike accident and missing the last 3 races. Robinson would not return for 2 years.

Trevor Hendy and Guy Leech during the 1993/94 series

By now both the series and Trevor Hendy were becoming more well known. Hendy had won every series and had also won the Australian Championships in the same years. In the Australian Championships both the Uncle Tobys and Nutri-Grain competitors would compete together; the fact that Hendy had beaten all-commers left no doubt in the public's mind that he was clearly the best Iron Man in Australia.

1992/93 saw 5 races with 5 different winners before an epic final at Manly featuring 3 contenders for overall series victory. Guy Andrews had finished second to Hendy for the previous 2 years and when it came time for the final race both himself and Sean Kenny were on equal points with Hendy meaning the winner of the final race would win the series. Hendy had a disappointing race and was not in contention however Andrews and Kenny staged one of the most memorable battles in Iron Man history. Andrews initially led the race and Kenny began to close the gap eventually catching up to Andrews before a final sprint finish with Andrews then prevailing to take series victory.

Over the 7 race series in 1993/94, Hendy won 5 races and finished second twice. The season also saw the return of crowd favourite Craig Riddington who had missed the previous year with a blood clot in his arm.

=== 1994-1996: The changing of the guard ===
The 1994–95 season saw many new faces make their presence felt. Youngsters Phil Clayton, Scott Reeves and Simon Martin were showing their class while the likes of Scott Thomson and Guy Andrews (who were by now veterans) also remained at the top. The series was won by Michael King despite the fact that he did not win a single race in the seven race series. His consistency was enough for him to win based on overall points.

It was around this time that Trevor Hendy would begin to turn his attention to kayak paddling in hope of making Australia's Olympic Team. Despite devoting most of his training time to kayaks, Trevor still remained competitive and managed to finish second in the 1994–95 series.

The Gold Coast Gold would return for the 1995/96 season and would be won by Scott Reeves. This was to be Scott's first and only attempt at the race. Guy Andrews would go on to win the series for the second time.

=== The Baywatch Episode ===
In 1996 20 of the contracted competitors were flown the United States to star in an episode of Baywatch. The episode was based around the Iron Men visiting the Baywatch characters and staging a race against them. In the fictional race Trevor Hendy narrowly beat Mitch Buchannon who was played by David Hasselhoff.

Jonathan Crowe, Guy Andrews and Trevor Hendy all had speaking roles in the episode as did series promoter Michael Porra.

=== The Piha Race ===
That same season, 1996/97, saw probably the most famous ironman race to be run in the series. Piha beach, New Zealand, played host to Round Five of that year's series, and gave the series its biggest surf ever to be raced in. It is well remembered for two waves from Grant Wilkinson, who first picked a perfect wave on the ski leg, a ten-foot wave that never broke until it got to shore. On the board leg, he went better, catching a twelve-foot, and survived being swallowed by the white water, doing a few barrel rolls, before coming out the front of the wave. The race is also remembered for a fifteen-foot set that came through at the end of the final ski leg, and the four competitors who just snuck over it. Scott Reeves won that race, and then went on to win the series later that season.

=== 1997-1998: The emergence of Ky Hurst ===
During the 1997–98 season, the sports newest superstar emerged in 16-year-old Ky Hurst. Hurst would soon become the sports leading competitor and would later represent Australia at the 2008 and 2012 Olympics.

The 1997-98 also saw Darren and Dean Mercer compete in the series for the first time however surprisingly neither of them were competitive. By now the prizemoney for the entire series was at a total of $900,000. This was also to be the first season where series creator Michael Porra would not be involved with the series. Porra had also commentated every race since 1989. Guy Andrews went on to win the series for the third time.

=== 1999-2001 Series decline and lack of sponsorship ===
Phil Clayton competing during the 2000/01 series

During the late 1990s the series began to struggle to attract sponsorship. As a result, prize money became less and the amount of contracted competitors decreased from 20 to 12. Television coverage also decreased. Originally each race would normally be a 3-hour broadcast and there would also be a 1-hour highlights package shown later that night. By the late 1990s the entire broadcast was limited to 2 hours and this also included the Ironwomen races. The profile of leading competitors was not as great as the Iron Men of the early 1990s when the series was at its peak.

The Sydney Olympics had been believed to be the main reason why sponsorship had gone elsewhere as most companies wanted to be an Olympic sponsor and this meant there was not enough leftover funds to put into sports such as IronMan.

As a result, the escalating costs became too much and a decision was made to discontinue the series in June 2001.

== Formats ==
Unlike many other sports, IronMan racing, and especially the Super Series, relied on many different formats, to appeal to both viewers and different types of athletes.

=== The Gold Coast Gold ===
Based on The Coolangatta Gold, the ultra-endurance test was run in 1989, 1991 and 1995. The idea of the new race was the same as the original, a race from Surfer's Paradise, down to Coolangatta, and back up again. However, the race format of The Gold Coast Gold was essentially the reverse; it started with a 22.7 kilometres (14.1 mi) ski leg from Surfer's to the Greenmount end of Coolangatta, a run to the northern end of Coolangatta beach, a board paddle to Tugun, a 2.2 kilometres (1.4 mi) run across to Currumbin Creek, then a 2.3 kilometres (1.4 mi) swim along Palm Beach, another 2.2 kilometres (1.4 mi) run, the penultimate leg, a swim around Burleigh Heads, before the final 10 kilometres (6.2 mi) run from Burleigh, over Nobby's Headland, and then onto Surfer's Paradise. Considered the hardest race in IronMan, and also the most prestigious. It lasted around 4 and a half hours, over twice the next longest format. It was only run three times, with three different winners, Guy Leech, Jonathon Crowe and Scott Reeves. Scott Reeves would become one of the few IronMen, along with Michael King and Zane Holmes, to win this race or The Coolangatta Gold, and a Professional Series Title (Reeves The Gold 1995 and the Series in 1996/97, King in 1991 and 1994/95, and Holmes in 2006 and 2007/08) . Darren Mercer also won The Coolangatta Gold in 1992, and was a six time IronMan champion in the Kellogg's Surf League. The Gold Coast Gold would also see the largest fields in Super Series history. While the typical field for an endurance race was 36 competitors, in 1991 the event was contested by 48, and in 1995, by nearly 100.

=== The Marathon ===
The two-hour endurance race was run in a more traditional IronMan style, with water legs in and out of the surf with run legs in between. While not as gruelling as The Gold Coast Gold, The Marathon events were traditionally races for similar athletes, especially Guy Leech, who proved to be very adept at racing over the longer distance. While the format for The Marathon changed slightly from race to race and year to year, the basic concept remained the same. Beginning with a run leg of about 800–1200 m, usually with some mix of soft and hard sand. The race then moved onto the first water leg. After it was completed, the run was completed again, which was followed on by the second water leg, and so on for the third water leg. The three water legs (ski, swim, board), would then be completed again, in the same order, which was then followed up with a final run to the finish. The order of the water legs was random as in typical surf carnivals. The courses also varied depending on the venue. At some, an m-shaped course was run, meaning the athletes had to negotiate the surf twice per leg, whereas others used a box-shaped course, and gave different value to different parts of the course, depending on what winds were blowing. While the endurance aspect of The Marathon suited some athletes more than others, the constant transitioning between the various legs, and negotiating the break, meant that the winner would have to be adept at every aspect of the IronMan sport, and not just as an endurance athlete. The typical distances for each leg were: Run 1200 m Ski 3200 m Swim 1600 m Board 2400 m. While The Marathon proved to be one of the more successful formats, it was only ever raced in the Super Series, and with the Series' demise in 2001, the Marathon followed. However, it was re-introduced in 2010 for the re-made Kellogg's Nutri-Grain IronMan Series.

=== The Triple Sprint ===
Raced in the first series in 1989 at North Bondi, although not under that name, the Triple Sprint consisted of three 20-25 minute IronMan races. The competitors places from each race would be tallied, and the person with the lowest score would win. The format traditionally used the same course as the normal IronMan race, although it did also use the m-shape course for the water legs. The Triple Sprint was the domain of Trevor Hendy, who dominated it in its first two years at North Bondi, and also at Portsea in 1993/94, in massive swell, despite coming to grief in one of the ski legs. It was also the format to be used at Piha in 1996/97, although due to the size of the surf, this was changed to two races. The Triple Sprint was one of the formats that lasted beyond the Super Series, although not under the same guise. It was officially re-introduced in 2010/11 at Portsea.

=== The Quadrathon ===
The first of the 'individual legs' format, and the forerunner to the Pursuit, the Quadrathon involved individual Ski, Swim, Board and Running Races, each lasting about twenty to thirty minutes. The winner was decided in the same manner as the Triple Sprint, by adding the placings from each race. The first three Quadrathons were held at Portsea, and were consequently the domain of Trevor Hendy

=== The Pursuit ===
Involving a similar course to The Quadrathon, The Pursuit consisted of an individual Ski, Swim and Board race. These races would be timed, with the times for each competitor being added up from the three races, to give a handicap for a final run leg. Because The Pursuit required consistency over all three water legs, but also some luck in coming into the surf, it did throw up some upsets, such as Craig Hackett at Portsea in 1996/97, and Dwayne Thuys in 1997/98.

=== Survivor ===
The brainchild of Guy Leech and Trevor Hendy, the survivor was one of the few formats that used the 'typical' IronMan, consisting of three water legs of about three minutes each, plus a short run transition, lasting between 12 and 15 minutes. Survivor started the day with 20 competitors, with the last four to be eliminated each time, until a fifth race consisting of a final four to decide the winner. Due to fatigue, and the cut-throat nature of the races, it was one of the most exciting formats. Because of its race length, it become useful in determining the short course form of many Super Series athletes, who tended not to race in many surf carnivals due to the congested Series schedule. In fact, Guy Andrews won the first Survivor format in 1992/93, and then won his only Australian title that same season. One of the few formats to survive after the Super Series. The Surf League used a two race eliminator format for the IronMan event in 2002/03. A three race eliminator was then used as a series final at Coogee for many years. The five race eliminator made its return at Bondi in December 2010.

=== Man on Man ===
Only held once, at Glenelg in 1996, Man on Man involved head to head races between two competitors in short, 6 minute races. The event was conducted with a knockout draw, and was eventually won by Trevor Hendy, his last ever Super Series race win.

=== The Final ===
The classic end to most seasons of the Super Series, The Final was a 75-80 minute race, consisting of an 1800m run, then three water legs, the same water legs in the same order, then a final 1800m run. The relative shortness of The Final lead to some very close exciting racing, including the 1992/93 final where Guy Andrews won the race and the series by two metres over Sean Kenny, and the 1994/95 final at Portsea, where Phil Clayton gapped Trevor Hendy in the final run to win his first race, and gave Michael King the series win.

== Locations ==
=== The Gold Coast ===
Traditionally the location of the first event of the year, the Gold Coast was used in its entirety for the Gold Coast Gold. Other beaches to be raced at were Surfer's Paradise, Kurrawa, Coolangatta, Duranbah and Southport. Because it usually held the first event, the Gold Coast typically hosted a Marathon.

=== North Bondi ===
The spiritual home of Surf Lifesaving, the Bondi event, which was held at the family-friendly north end, was one a few Sydney beaches that held a series race.

=== Glenelg ===
Typified by its lack of surf, and either very hot and flat, or very cold and windy conditions, Glenelg held a marathon event in the first few years

=== Portsea ===
Perhaps the most well-known location in the Super Series, and even Ironman racing in general, Portsea lay claim to the most difficult conditions faced in the series. With massive surf, big winds, cold water and rocks all round the norm, Portsea was a viewer and athlete favourite. In testament to his talent as an Ironman, Trevor Hendy dominated here, winning the first three events here. Held the final on a number of occasions, including in 1995, where five people went into the race with an opportunity of winning the series, and gave Phil Clayton his first win, and the last ever Super Series race, in 2001, where Wes Berg needed a substantial margin over Ky Hurst in order to win the series. Berg would go out over the rock shelf to the right of the beach, thinking it would give him an advantage while everyone else ran down to the rip to the left. It nearly worked, until he ended up rolling under a ten-foot wave, and then struggling to get out.

=== Manly ===
Held the final race on a number of occasions, including in massive swell in 1990, and the closest decider ever in 1993. Always drew a big crowd.

=== Coolum ===
The Coolum event was held in front of the Hyatt Coolum Resort, which was a change from the norm where most races were held in front of the local surf club. Coolum races often held a run leg through the resort and across the golf course, which served as both a promotional exercise, and an opportunity to look at the road running styles of the athletes.

=== Piha ===
A New Zealand beach west of Auckland, that was only raced at twice, but held perhaps one of the best races in series history. Scott Reeves won the Double Sprint event in 1996/97 in the biggest surf ever in an Ironman, with average set of 10–12 feet, and a set at the end of the day that was about 15 foot.

== Comparisons with triathlon ==
Although many people considered the sport to be another form of triathlon, the two sports were vastly different. Several athletes from each sport tried to compete in the other, but without great success.

Triathlon is a sport which is mostly lower body where Ironman is a sport that is mostly upper-body. Even though Ironmen have running as part of their races, the running they do is mostly on sand which requires a different technique and works muscles in a different way to road running. Alternatively triathletes who compete on the road would have a difficult time adjusting to sand running. The technical/surf skills involved in Ironman races were also something that would take years to develop, making the transition from triathlon very difficult.

Triathletes Spot Anderson and Rick Pallister competed in the Super Series with very limited success. Alternatively Guy Leech tried doing triathlons, but struggled with road running and technical bike skills, was never competitive and retired not long after.

Guy Andrews remains the only competitor to claim success in both sports. Andrews was an Australian age-group champion in triathlon/duathlon, and also completed an Ironman triathlon in a respectable time despite losing a pedal. Original Super Series Ironman Graham Bruce has also competed several Ironman triathlons and has always been competitive in his age group.

1989/90	Trevor Hendy	Guy Leech	Craig Riddington
1990/91	Trevor Hendy	Guy Andrews	Jon Robinson	Craig Riddington	Guy Leech	Barry Newman	Hayden Reece	Scott Thomson	Dwayne Thuys	Jay Gilbert
1991/92	Trevor Hendy	Guy Andrews	Guy Leech	Scott Thomson	Craig Riddington
1992/93	Guy Andrews	Sean Kenny	Trevor Hendy	Guy Leech
1993/94	Trevor Hendy	Michael King	Guy Andrews
1994/95	Michael King	Trevor Hendy	Phil Clayton	Scott Thomson
1995/96	Guy Andrews	Scott Reeves
1996/97	Scott Reeves	Trevor Hendy
1997/98	Guy Andrews
1998/99	Ky Hurst
1999/00	Ky Hurst
2000/01	Ky Hurst

== Women's Series winners ==
Season	Winner
1994/95	Reen Corbett
1995/96	Reen Corbett
1996/97	Karla Gilbert
1997/98	Karla Gilbert
1998/99	Karla Gilbert
1999/00	Karla Gilbert
2000/01	Reen Corbett

== Notable competitors ==
Clint Robinson - Olympic Gold Medalist in kayaks. Competed in the series sporadically from 1989 to 1995. Dominated board and ski legs but was very weak in the swim and run due to most of his training being centered around his kayaking.

Craig Hackett - Brother of Grant Hackett. Won two races during his time in the Uncle Tobys Super Series.

Hayden Reece - New Zealand competitor who was one of the oldest in the series but still very competitive especially in the board and run legs.

Murray Cox - Was known as the fastest runner of all competitors. Also a strong swimmer. Cox finished second in the 1991 Gold Coast Gold. Retired in 1995.

Jonathan Crowe - Winner of 3 Uncle Tobys races. Starred in the Baywatch episode. Although Crowe lacked consistency, when in form he was always near the top.

Jon Robinson - One of the leading competitors during the early years, was tragically injured in a motorbike accident in 1991. Returned in 1993 but had limited success. Retired in 1996.

Guy Andrews - The only Iron Man to compete in every season of the Uncle Tobys Super Series. Series winner 3 times. Strong in all 4 disciplines and over both short and long distances. Australian Iron Man champion in 1993. Had success as a triathlete winning the Australian 25/29 Age Olympic Distance triathlon and duathlon Titles in 1999. Completed Ironman Australia Triathlon in 2005 in 9h36min after his bike Crank fell off. Went on to be a world ranked Adventure racer and Stunt Driver with credits on Mad Max 4 Fury Road, Top Gear Australia and the live-action Warner Brother show Hollywood Stunt Driver Guy races today as an off-road triathlete, coach and has his own business.

Scott Thomson - Competed for 10 seasons and was in the top three finishers in several races. Won the first race of the 1994/95 season. A very strong runner and swimmer. Retired in 1999, after his surfboard broke in two during the final meeting of the season.

Grant Kenny - One of the main forces behind the creation of the series. Olympic Kayaker in 1984 and 1988. Despite being Australia's best Iron Man in the early 1980s, was never competitive in Uncle Tobys races as his attention by then had shifted to other areas. Became a commentator after retiring in 1992.

Craig Riddington - One of the highest profile Iron Men in the early years. He was very popular with fans and critics alike while being one of the strongest swimmers in the field and a great bodysurfer. Retired in 1996.

Guy Leech - The long distance king in the early years of the series. Also one of the main forces behind the development of the series. Despite being a star in the 1980s and early 1990s, he ran into health problems later in his career before switching to triathlons and then retiring in 1995. Became a commentator after retiring. Guy Leech is still a celebrity today and regularly appears on television as an advocate for health and fitness. Was an integral part in the rebirth of the Ironman Series in 2010/11, which featured many formats similar to the Super Series.

Brett Tyack - Victorian Iron Man who joined the series in the 1992/93 season and remained until the final season. Was always competitive without ever winning a race. Strong ski paddler.

Jay Gilbert - Brother of Karla, strong board paddler. Competed from 1990 to 1997.

Dwayne Thuys - Twice Australian Iron Man Champion. One of the original competitors from 1989. After competing for 10 seasons, Thuys finally won his first Uncle Tobys race at the age of 34 in front of a home crowd in South Australia. His victory was one of the most memorable of the series' 12-year history. Thuys was a very popular character. Retired in 1999.

Barry Newman - Another of the original Iron Men from the beginning of the series. Consistent competitor who retired in 1994

Sean Kenny - Talented Iron Man who won 2 races and in his career and missed out on claiming series victory by the narrowest of margins. Very strong swimmer. Not related to Grant Kenny.

Mark Bennetts: Long time Surf Lifesaving competitor; entered the series after 20 years in the sport. Very good board paddler and runner. Retired in 1996.

Trevor Hendy: Considered by many to be the greatest Ironman of all time, Hendy won the Super Series an unbeaten four times, including three in a row. His skill at winning can be attributed to his consistency; Hendy was competitive from formats lasting two hours to those lasting 15 minutes. He was also very good in flat water and nearly unbeatable in big surf. Also, a 6 time Australian champion.

Phil Clayton: Joined the series as a 16 year old in 1994/95, and led just his second race at Newcastle, before winning for the first time in that season at Portsea. Injury, bad luck and inconsistency prevented him from ever winning the series, although he was certainly good enough. Was a World Champion in 2000. As of 2012, is still competing in the Series and is coach at Kurrawa Surf Club

Ky Hurst The only other man apart from Trevor Hendy to win three Series in a row, and may have won more had it not been for the Series demise at the peak of his career. Won four Australian titles in a row, and seven Surf Race titles. Competed in the 10 kilometres (6.2 mi) Open Water Swim at Beijing, and competed in the same event at London. Still competes in the Series.

== Legacy ==
The Uncle Tobys Super Series if often referred to as the halcyon days of Surf Iron Man racing. Since its demise in 2001, the profile of the sport has decreased dramatically and the sports current competitors do not have the lucrative opportunities that Iron Men had in the 1990s. In 2010, the Kellogg's Nutri-Grain Ironman Series was reborn. It aired live on Network 10, as did the Super Series, and involves many of the same formats and beaches. Many of the former Super Series athletes were still involved in some way.
