= Loren Wulfsohn =

South African synchronized swimmer

Personal information
- Nationality: South Africa
- Born: 16 September 1968 (age 57)

Sport
- Sport: Swimming
- Strokes: Synchronized swimming
- Updated on 16 November 2014

Loren Wulfsohn (born 16 September 1968) is a former synchronized swimmer from South Africa. She competed in the women's solo and women's duet competitions at the 1992 Summer Olympics.
