= Beniamino Bonomi =

Italian sprint canoeist

Personal information
- Born: 9 March 1968 (age 58) Verbania, Italy

Sport
- Sport: Canoeing
- Club: Fiamme Gialle
Medal record
Olympic Games
Gold medal – first place	2000 Sydney	K-2 1000 m
Silver medal – second place	1996 Atlanta	K-1 1000 m
Silver medal – second place	1996 Atlanta	K-2 500 m
Silver medal – second place	2004 Athens	K-2 1000 m
World Championships
Gold medal – first place	1995 Duisburg	K-2 500 m
Silver medal – second place	1991 Paris	K-1 10000 m
Silver medal – second place	1997 Dartmouth	K-1 1000 m
Silver medal – second place	1997 Dartmouth	K-2 500 m
Silver medal – second place	1997 Dartmouth	K-2 200 m
Silver medal – second place	1998 Szeged	K-4 200 m
Silver medal – second place	1998 Szeged	K-2 500 m

Beniamino Bonomi (born 9 March 1968) is an Italian sprint canoeist who competed from the late 1980s to the mid-2000s (decade). Competing in five Summer Olympics, he won four medals with one gold (2000: K-2 1000 m) and three silvers (1996: K-1 1000 m, K-2 500 m; 2004: K-2 1000 m).

== Biography ==
Bonomi also won seven medals at the ICF Canoe Sprint World Championships with a gold (K-2 500 m: 1995) and six silvers (K-1 1000 m: 1997, K-1 10000 m: 1991, K-2 200 m: 1997, 1998; K-2 500 m: 1997, K-4 200 m: 1998).

He was member of the Gruppo Nautico Fiamme Gialle club. He is 181 cm (5 ft 11 in) tall and races at 81 kg (179 lb).
