= Petr Hruška (canoeist) =

Czech sprint canoeist (born 1971)

Petr Hruška (born 30 August 1971 in Uherské Hradiště) is a Czech sprint canoeist who competed for Czechoslovakia and the Czech Republic in the early to mid-1990s. Competing in two Summer Olympics, he earned is best finish of seventh in the K-2 1000 m event for Czechoslovakia at Barcelona in 1992.
