= Jan-Dirk Nijkamp =

Dutch sprint canoer (born 1964)

Jan-Dirk Nijkamp (born August 11, 1964 in Voorst) is a Dutch sprint canoer who competed in the early 1990s. He competed for the Deventer Kano Vereniging. At the 1992 Summer Olympics in Barcelona, he was eliminated in the repechages of both the K-2 500 m and the K-2 1000 m event.

== Career ==
Nijkamp participated in the World Cup Canoe of 1985 at Hazewinkel in Heindonk, Belgium, of 1990 in Duisburg, Germany, and of 1991 in Paris. In Paris, Nijkamp and his canoe partner Marc Weijzen met the minimum time for the 1992 Summer Olympics. The final decision that Nijkamp and Weijzen could represent the Netherlands in the Olympics was made by Dutch Olympic Committee in June 1992.
