= Willem van Riet =

South African canoeist

Willem van Riet (born 3 October 1969) is a South African canoe sprinter who competed in the early 1990s. At the 1992 Summer Olympics in Barcelona, he was eliminated in the repechages of both the K-1 500 m and the K-2 1000 m events.
