= Gunnar Olsson (canoeist) =

Swedish sprint canoer (born 1960)

Medal record

Men's canoe sprint

Olympic Games
Silver medal – second place	1992 Barcelona	K-2 1000 m

World Championships
Silver medal – second place	1993 Copenhagen	K-2 10000 m
Bronze medal – third place	1990 Poznań	K-4 10000 m
Bronze medal – third place	1993 Copenhagen	K-2 1000 m

Gunnar Olsson (born 26 April 1960) is a Swedish sprint canoer who competed from the mid-1980s to the early 1990s. Competing in two Summer Olympics, he won a silver medal in the K-2 1000 m event at Barcelona in 1992.

Olsson also won a silver medal in the K-2 10000 m event in Copenhagen at the 1993 ICF Canoe Sprint World Championships and two bronze medals in the K-4 10000 m event in Poznań 1993 ICF Canoe Sprint World Championships and in the K-2 1000 m event in Copenhagen 1993 ICF Canoe Sprint World Championships.
