= Amanda Taylor =

South African synchronized swimmer

Personal information
- Full name: Amanda Teona Taylor
- Nationality: South Africa
- Born: 31 May 1973 (age 53)

Sport
- Sport: Swimming
- Strokes: Synchronized swimming
- Updated on 16 November 2014

Amanda Taylor (born 31 May 1973) is a former synchronized swimmer from South Africa. She competed in the women's solo and women's duet competitions at the 1992 Summer Olympics.
