= Kenneth Cawood =

South African swimmer

Personal information
- Born: 5 July 1971 (age 55)

Sport
- Sport: Swimming

Kenneth Cawood (born 5 July 1971) is a South African swimmer. He competed in three events at the 1992 Summer Olympics.
