= Santa Tereza, Rio Grande do Sul =

Municipality in Rio Grande do Sul, Brazil

Coordinates: 29°10′08″S 51°44′06″W

- Municipality
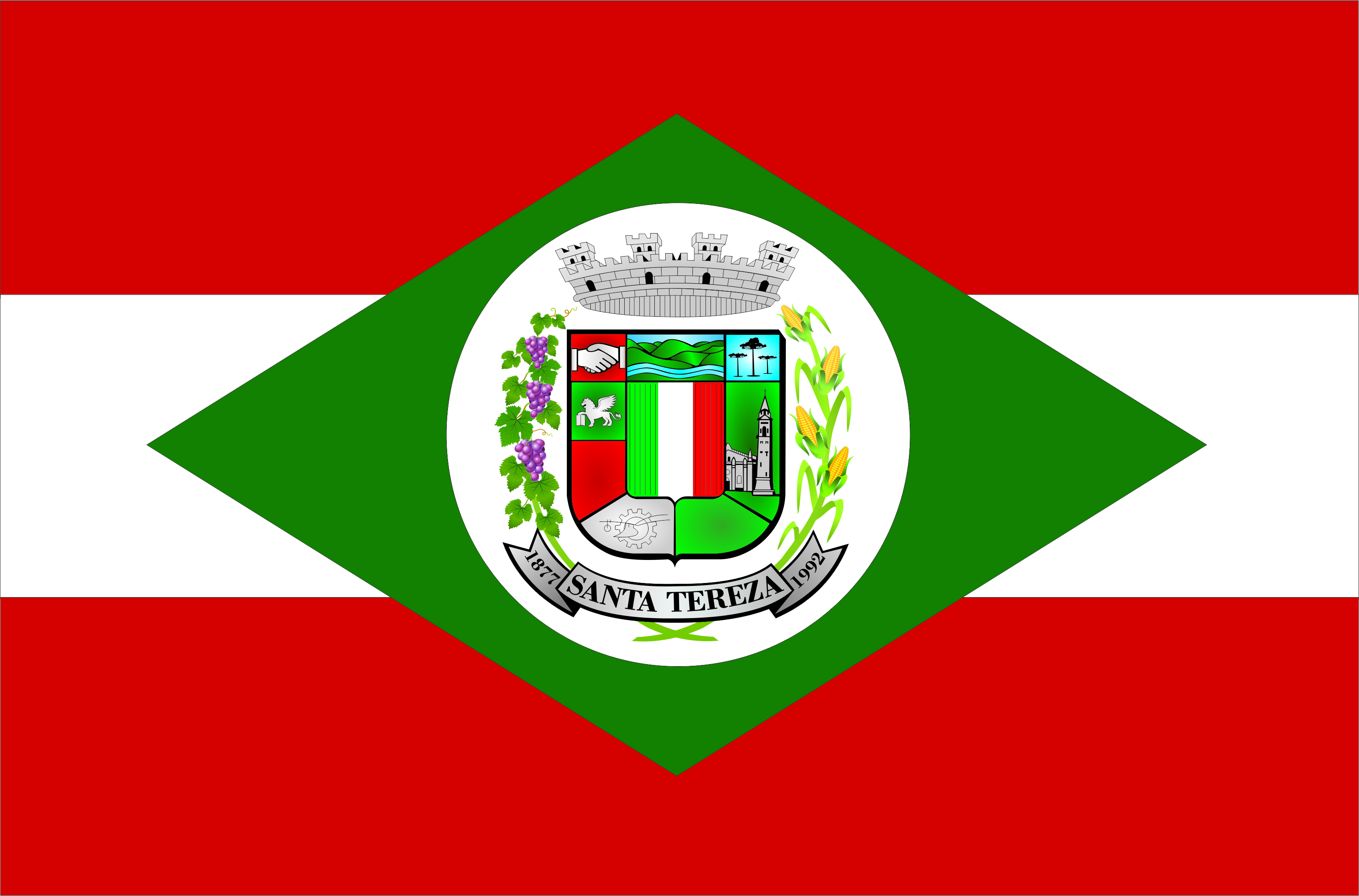
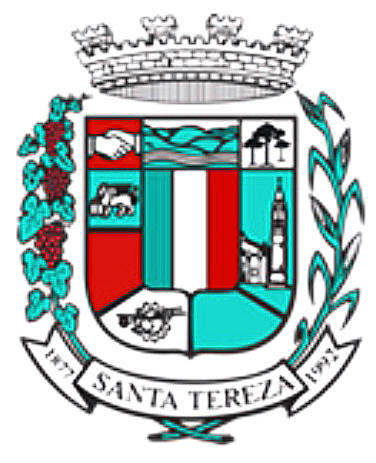
- Flag Coat of arms
- Interactive map of Santa Tereza, Rio Grande do Sul
- Country: Brazil
- Time zone: UTC−3 (BRT)

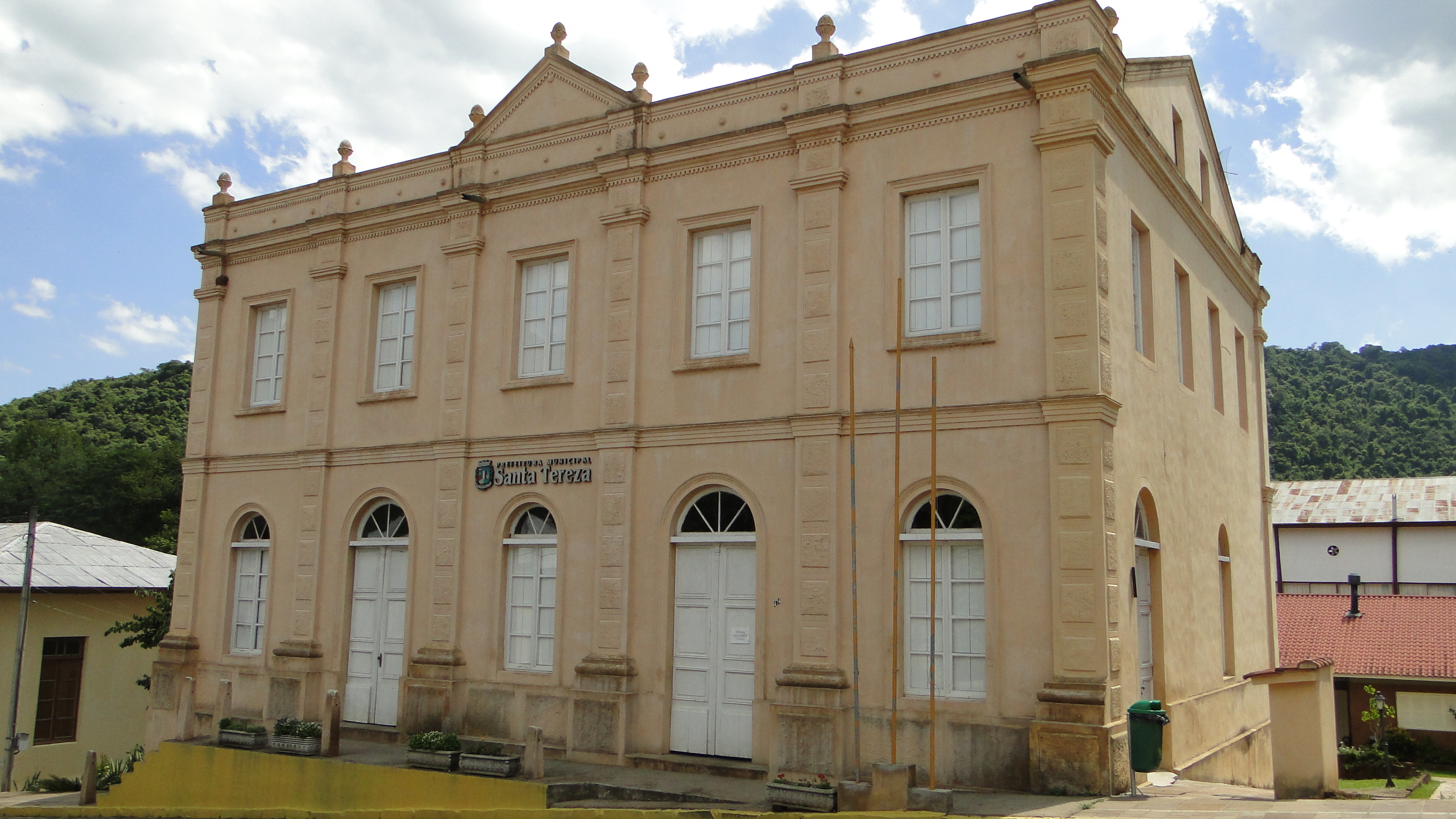
Santa Tereza City Hall

Santa Tereza is a municipality in the state of Rio Grande do Sul, Brazil. It was raised to municipality status in 1992, the area being taken out of the municipalities of Bento Gonçalves, Garibaldi and Roca Sales. As of 2020, the estimated population was 1,726.

== See also ==
- List of municipalities in Rio Grande do Sul
