= Jan Tau =

South African long-distance runner

Personal information
- Nationality: South African
- Born: 18 January 1960 (age 66)

Sport
- Sport: Long-distance running
- Event: Marathon

Jan Tau (born 18 January 1960) is a South African long-distance runner. He competed in the men's marathon at the 1992 Summer Olympics.
