= Juan Manuel Sánchez =

Spanish canoeist

Medal record

Men's canoe sprint

Representing Spain

World Championships
Gold medal – first place	1991 Paris	K-2 500 m
Silver medal – second place	1991 Paris	K-2 1000 m
Bronze medal – third place	1993 Copenhagen	K-2 500 m

Juan Manuel Sánchez de Castro (born 18 April 1965) is a Spanish sprint canoer who competed from the late 1980s to the mid-1990s. He won a complete set of medals at the ICF Canoe Sprint World Championships with a gold (K-2 500 m: 1991), a silver (K-2 1000 m: 1991), and a bronze (K-2 500 m: 1993).

Sánchez also competed in four Summer Olympics, earning his best finish of fourth in the K-2 500 m event at Barcelona in 1992.
