= Seddon Keyter =

South African swimmer

Personal information
- Born: 25 August 1970 (age 55)

Sport
- Sport: Swimming

Seddon Keyter (born 25 August 1970) is a South African swimmer. He competed in four events at the 1992 Summer Olympics.
