= Kalle Sundqvist =

Swedish canoeist

Medal record

Men's canoe sprint

Olympic Games
Silver medal – second place	1992 Barcelona	K-2 1000 m

World Championships
Gold medal – first place	1985 Mechelen	K-4 1000 m
Silver medal – second place	1987 Duisburg	K-4 1000 m
Silver medal – second place	1993 Copenhagen	K-2 10000 m
Bronze medal – third place	1983 Tampere	K-2 10000 m
Bronze medal – third place	1985 Mechelen	K-1 1000 m
Bronze medal – third place	1985 Mechelen	K-4 500 m
Bronze medal – third place	1987 Duisburg	K-2 500 m
Bronze medal – third place	1989 Plovdiv	K-1 1000 m
Bronze medal – third place	1990 Poznań	K-4 10000 m
Bronze medal – third place	1993 Copenhagen	K-2 1000 m

Karl-Axel "Kalle" Sundqvist (born 29 November 1962) is a Swedish sprint canoeist who competed from the mid-1980s to the early 1990s. Competing in three Summer Olympics, he won a silver medal in the K-2 1000 m event at Barcelona in 1992.

Sundqvist also won ten medals at the ICF Canoe Sprint World Championships with a gold (K-4 1000 m: 1985), two silvers (K-2 10000 m: 1993, K-4 1000 m: 1987), and seven bronzes (K-1 1000 m: 1985, 1989; K-2 500 m: 1987, K-2 1000 m: 1993, K-2 10000 m: 1983, K-4 500 m: 1985, K-4 10000 m: 1990).
