= Heleen Mees =

Dutch columnist, lawyer and feminist

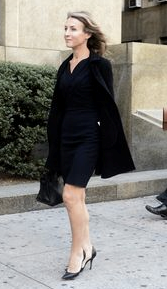
- Heleen Mees (2014)
- Born: Heleen Nijkamp; 1968 (age 56–57); Hengelo, Overijssel, Netherlands
- Website: www.heleenmees.com

Heleen Mees (born Heleen Nijkamp, 1968) is a Dutch opinion writer, economist, and lawyer. Involved with politics and public policy in the Netherlands and the US, she has also taught at universities in both countries.

== Biography ==
Mees graduated in Economy and Law at University of Groningen. From 1992 to 1998, she worked for the Dutch Treasury in The Hague, for two years as spokeswoman for former State Secretary Willem Vermeend. She then worked for the European Commission in Brussels from 1998 to 2000. In 2000 she emigrated to the US, where she changed her surname from Nijkamp to Mees.

In New York Mees was initially employed as a European affairs consultant for Ernst & Young. When her contract was not renewed, Mees stayed in New York and worked as an independent consultant on European affairs. Mees also started writing opinion pieces for several Dutch newspapers.

Mees' breakthrough as an opinion writer (she is credited as a third wave feminist) in the Netherlands came in 2006 when she wrote "The time is long overdue that women should go to work", her first feminist opinion piece in NRC Handelsblad. The same year, she co-founded Women on Top, an organization that until 2011 advocated more women in top jobs. As a firm advocate of female ambition and a promoter of more women in the supervisory and executive boards of big companies, Mees has been described as a "power feminist".

From 2006 to 2010 she wrote a bi-weekly column in NRC Handelsblad, and from 2012 to 2013 a weekly column for Het Financieele Dagblad. She has written for publications such as Foreign Policy and for Project Syndicate In September 2015 she was a guest columnist for de Volkskrant, and in 2016 began a biweekly column for that same paper.

She was vice-president of the chapter of the Dutch Labour Party (PvdA) in New York. From 2005 to 2008 she worked as volunteer-fundraiser for the presidential campaign of Hillary Clinton. In July 2013, Mees was arrested in New York on charges of stalking her former lover, the chief economist of Citigroup, Willem Buiter. In March 2014, the court decided that the case against Mees was to be dismissed in one year provided that she complies with two conditions. Later that year, in September 2014, Mees responded by filing for damages against Buiter. In November 2016, Mees simultaneously lost both lawsuits in Amsterdam and New York.

In August 2012, Mees completed a doctoral thesis at the Erasmus School of Economics, in which she argued that the primary cause of the 2008 financial crisis was the flourishing economy in China and resulting savings and government investments by the Chinese. While completing her research, she worked as an Adjunct Assistant Professor at Tilburg University. From September 2012 until July 2013, Mees was employed as an Adjunct Associate Professor of Public Administration at New York University's Robert F. Wagner Graduate School of Public Service.

== Publications ==
=== in English ===
- Mees, Heleen (2012). Changing fortunes : how China's boom caused the financial crisis. ERIM Ph.D. series research in management, 266. Rotterdam: Erasmus Research Institute of Management (ERIM), Erasmus University Rotterdam. ISBN 9789058923110. OCLC 869743485. PhD dissertation, 159 pp.
- "NY Service Economy - A Template for a Future Suburbia" in Here, There, Everywhere 2014. DroogLab Amsterdam. ISBN 978-9090281735
- The Chinese Birdcage - How China's Rise Almost Toppled the West (2016). ISBN 978-1-137-58885-2

=== in Dutch ===
- Mees, Heleen (2009). Tussen hebzucht en verlangen - de wereld en het grote geld. Columns over actuele sociaal-economische kwesties [Between Greed And Desire - Big Money and the World] (in Dutch). Nieuw Amsterdam. ISBN 978-90-468-0572-5.
- Mees, Heleen (2007). Weg met het deeltijdfeminisme! : over vrouwen, ambitie en carrière [No More Part-Time Feminism! - On Women, Ambition and Career] (in Dutch) (2nd ed.). Amsterdam: Nieuw Amsterdam. ISBN 9789046802144. OCLC 150254852. 160pp. First edition was 2006.
- Compendium van het Europees belastingrecht [Compendium of EU Law] (2002) (coauthor). ISBN 90-200-2435-3
