= José Garcia (canoeist) =

Portuguese canoeist

Medal record

Men's canoe sprint

World Championships
Bronze medal – third place	1989 Plovdiv	K-1 10000 m

José Garcia (born 10 February 1964) is a Portuguese sprint canoeist who competed from the late 1980s to the late 1990s. He won a bronze medal in the K-1 10000 m event at the 1989 ICF Canoe Sprint World Championships in Plovdiv.

Garcia also competed in three Summer Olympics, earning his best finish of sixth in the K-1 1000 m event at Barcelona in 1992.
