= Bennie Reynders =

South African sprint canoer

Bennie Reynders (born 16 May 1962) is a South African canoe sprinter who competed in the early 1990s. At the 1992 Summer Olympics in Barcelona, he was eliminated in the repechages of the K-2 500 m event and the semifinals of the K-4 1000 m event.
