= Marin Popescu =

Romanian canoeist

Medal record

Men's canoe sprint

World Championships
Silver medal – second place	1994 Mexico City	K-4 200 m
Silver medal – second place	1994 Mexico City	K-4 500 m
Bronze medal – third place	1993 Copenhagen	K-1 1000 m

Marin Popescu (born July 27, 1973) is a Romanian sprint canoeist who competed in the 1990s. He won three medals at the ICF Canoe Sprint World Championships with two silvers (K-4 200 m and K-4 500 m: both 1994) and a bronze (K-1 1000 m: 1993).

Popescu also competed in two Summer Olympics, earning his best finish of fourth in the K-1 1000 m event at Barcelona in 1992.
