= Mikko Kolehmainen =

Finnish canoeist (born 1964)

Medal record

Men's canoe sprint

Olympic Games
Gold medal – first place	1992 Barcelona	K-1 500 m

World Championships
Gold medal – first place	1993 Copenhagen	K-1 500 m

Mikko Yrjö Ilmari Kolehmainen (born 18 August 1964 in Mikkeli) is a Finnish canoe sprinter who competed from the mid-1980s to the mid-1990s. Competing in four Summer Olympics, he won the gold medal in the K-1 500 m event at Barcelona in 1992. Kolehmainen's victory was Finland's only gold medal at those games.

By now established as Finland's strongest kayak sprinter, he concentrated in the K-1 500 m discipline. Although a respected competitor at international regattas he never threatened the top paddlers for the major prizes. At the 1991 World Championships in Paris, he finished a creditable seventh.

It was therefore a major shock when, at the Barcelona Olympics in 1992, he won the K-1 500 m gold medal. His victory over reigning champion Zsolt Gyulay of Hungary gave Finland their only gold medal of an otherwise disappointing Games.

A year later, he won the world championship K-1 500 m title in Copenhagen. At his farewell Olympics, in Atlanta in 1996 he finished in seventh place, and carried the flag at the opening ceremony.
