= Knut Holmann =

Norwegian sprint kayaker

Medal record

Men's kayak sprint

Representing Norway

Olympic Games
Gold medal – first place	1996 Atlanta	K-1 1000 m
Gold medal – first place	2000 Sydney	K-1 500 m
Gold medal – first place	2000 Sydney	K-1 1000 m
Silver medal – second place	1992 Barcelona	K-1 1000 m
Silver medal – second place	1996 Atlanta	K-1 500 m
Bronze medal – third place	1992 Barcelona	K-1 500 m

World Championships
Gold medal – first place	1990 Poznań	K-1 1000 m
Gold medal – first place	1991 Paris	K-1 1000 m
Gold medal – first place	1993 Copenhagen	K-1 1000 m
Gold medal – first place	1995 Duisburg	K-1 1000 m
Silver medal – second place	1991 Paris	K-1 500 m
Silver medal – second place	1993 Copenhagen	K-1 10000 m
Silver medal – second place	1995 Duisburg	K-1 500 m
Silver medal – second place	1998 Szeged	K-1 1000 m
Silver medal – second place	1999 Milan	K-1 1000 m
Bronze medal – third place	1994 Mexico City	K-1 500 m
Bronze medal – third place	1994 Mexico City	K-1 1000 m
Bronze medal – third place	1997 Dartmouth	K-1 1000 m
Bronze medal – third place	1998 Szeged	K-4 200 m

Knut Holmann (born 31 July 1968, in Oslo) is a Norwegian sprint kayaker competed from the early 1990s to the early 2000s (decade). Competing in four Summer Olympics, he won six medals. This included three golds (K-1 500 m: 2000, K-1 1000 m: 1996, 2000), two silvers (K-1 500 m: 1996, K-1 1000 m: 1992), and one bronze (K-1 500 m: 1992).

He is widely regarded to have some of the best kayaking technique ever.

Holmann also won thirteen ICF Canoe Sprint World Championships with four golds (K-1 1000 m: 1990, 1991, 1993, 1995), five silvers (K-1 500 m: 1991, 1995; K-1 1000 m: 1998, 1999; K-1 10000 m: 1993), and four bronzes (K-1 500 m: 1994, K-1 1000 m: 1994, 1997; K-4 200 m: 1998).
