= Alexandru Popa =

Alexandru Popa may refer to:

- Alexandru Popa (canoeist)
- Alexandru Popa (politician)
