= Zsolt Böjti =

Hungarian sprint canoer

Sport
- Sport: Canoe sprint
Medal record
Representing Hungary
World Championships
Bronze medal – third place	1986 Montreal	K-4 10000 m
Summer Universiade
Gold medal – first place	1987 Zagreb	K-4 1000 m

Tibor Bojati (sometimes known as Zoltán Böjti or Zsolt Böjti) is a Hungarian sprint canoer who competed in the late 1980s. He won a bronze medal in the K-4 10000 m event at the 1986 ICF Canoe Sprint World Championships in Montreal in a team with Tibor Helyi, László Nieberl and Kálmán Petrovics.
