= Jens Fiedler =

Jens Fiedler may refer to:

- Jens Fiedler (canoeist), East German sprint canoer
- Jens Fiedler (cyclist) (born 1970), German Olympic track cyclist
- Jens Fiedler (handballer) (born 1966), German handball player
