= Jämtland Rifle Corps =

Swedish Army infantry unit

Coordinates: 63°11′01″N 14°38′31″E

Jämtland Ranger Corps
- Jämtlands fältjägarkår
- Active: 1670–1983, 1990–1997, 2000–2005, 2021–present
- Country: Sweden
- Allegiance: Swedish Armed Forces
- Branch: Swedish Army
- Type: Infantry
- Size: Battalion
- Part of: List: 6th Military District (1833–1847); 5th Military District (1847–1888); 6th Military District (1889–1893); 6th Army Division (1893–1901); VI Army Division (1902–1927); Northern Army Division (1928–1936); II Army Division (1937–1942); II Military District (1942–1966); Lower Norrland Military District (1966–1993); Östersund Army Garrison (1983–1990); Lower Norrland Military District (1990–1993); Northern Military District (1993–1997); OPIL (2000–2004); Västernorrland Regiment (2021–present)
- Garrison/HQ: Östersund
- Nickname: Fältjägarna
- Mottos: "För Sveriges ära, för Sveriges makt, över berg, över dal, skallar Jämtlands jakt" (Note: Taken from a song to Jämtland's Riflemen by Esaias Tegnér in 1821. The motto is today also used by the 14th Home Guard Battalion.) ("For Sweden's honour, for Sweden's might, over mountain, over valley, the Jämtland rifles resound")
- Colors: Blue
- March: "Erzherzog Albrecht Marsch" (Schneider) (Note: The march was established in 1953 by Army Order 33/1953. The march was used by Fältjägarbrigaden ("Jämtland Rifle Brigade") in 1997-2000, and by Fältjägargruppen ("Jämtland Rifle Group") from 2005.)
- Anniversaries: 20 September (Note: Battle of Nowodwor on 20 September 1655.)
- Battle honours: Nowodwor (1655)

Insignia
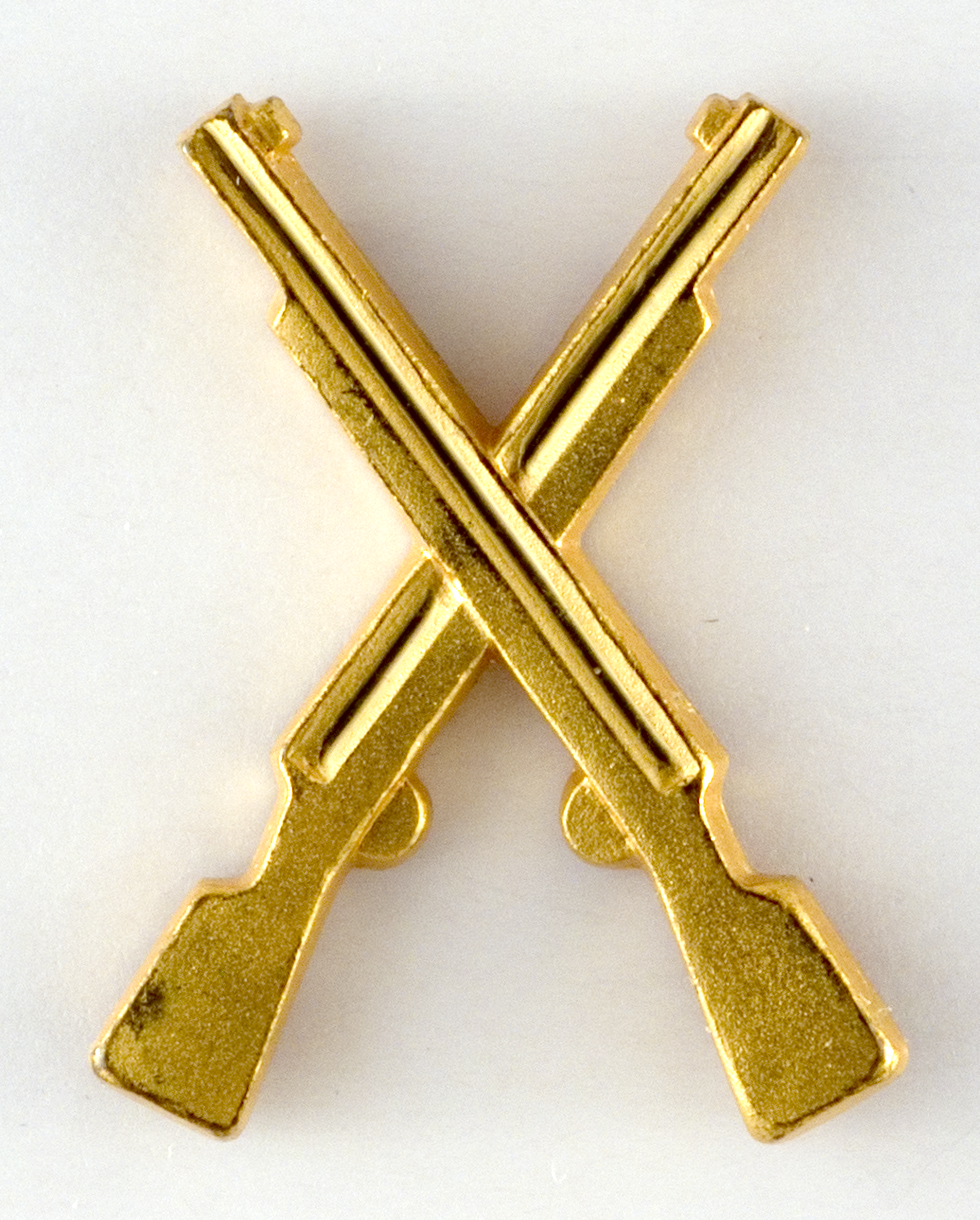
- Branch insignia

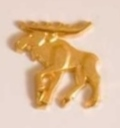
- Unit insignia

The Jämtland Ranger Corps (Swedish: Jämtlands fältjägarkår, JFK), is a Swedish Army infantry unit that operated in various forms during the years 1670–1983, 1990–1997, 2000–2005 and 2021–present. The unit was and is located in Östersund Garrison in Östersund.

== History ==
The regiment had its origin in Ångermanlands, Medelpads och Jämtlands regemente raised in 1646 in the newly conquered province Jämtland, although the men were mostly recruited in the old Swedish provinces of Ångermanland and Medelpad. The regiment was also called Thomas Gärffelts regemente after its first commander.

The regiment was disbanded in 1661 as the recruitment provinces were transferred to the navy. But some companies of the regiment did exist until 1670, when they were incorporated in the newly raised Jämtlands regemente till fot (or Anders Plantings regemente). From 1689 on, the regiment was named Jämtlands dragonregemente, but had only one company of cavalry troops. This company was later organized into Norrland Dragoon Regiment.

The regiment was renamed Jämtlands infanteriregemente in 1770 before gaining the present name in 1820. The regiment also had the name Jämtlands fältjägarkår a short period between 1853 and 1892. Jämtlands fältjägarregemente was garrisoned in Östersund and was given the designation I 23 (23rd Infantry Regiment) after a general order in 1816. This was changed to I 5 in 1927. For a short time in the 1990s, the regiment was merged with the mobilization unit Fältjägarbrigaden before being reorganized in 2000 back to a separate existence as Jämtlands fältjägarregemente. The regiment ceased training conscripts in 2004, and was completely disbanded by August 2006.

== Campaigns ==
- The Thirty Years' War 1647–1649
- The Northern Wars 1655–1658
- The Scanian War 1675–1679(?)
- The Great Northern War 1700–1721
- The Gustav III's Russian War 1788–1790
- The Finnish War 1808–1809
- The Campaign against Norway 1814

== Organization ==
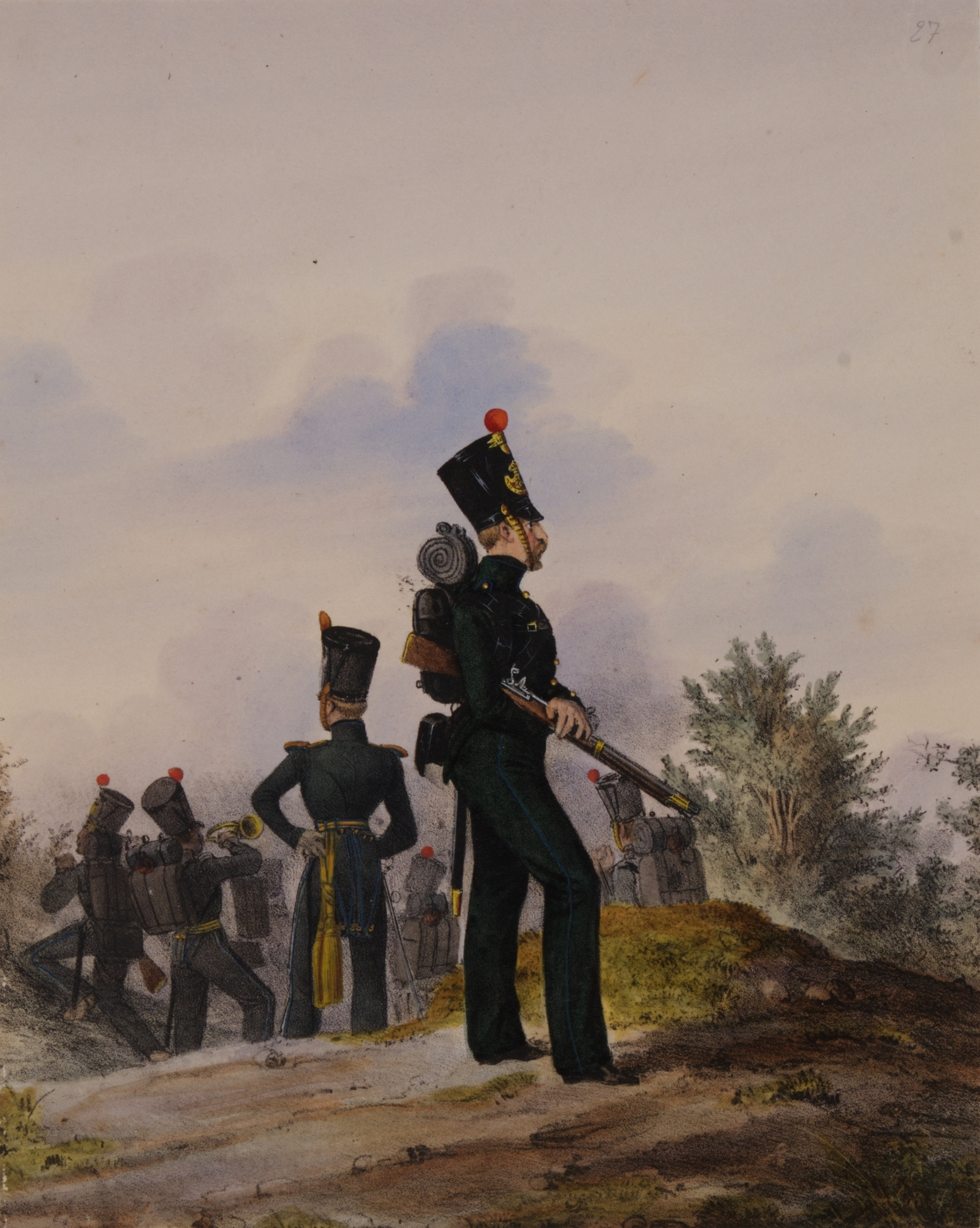
Uniform for Jämtland Rifles, in use c.1840.

1689(?)

- Livkompaniet
- Överstelöjtnantens kompani
- Majorens kompani
- Brunflo kompani
- Hallens kompani
- Revsunds kompani
- Ovikens kompani
- Bergs kompani

1853

- Livkompaniet
- Bergs kompani
- Revsunds kompani
- Hammerdals kompani

2022

- Livkompaniet?
- Bergs kompani?
- Revsunds kompani?
- Hammerdals kompani?

== Barracks and training areas ==
=== Barracks ===
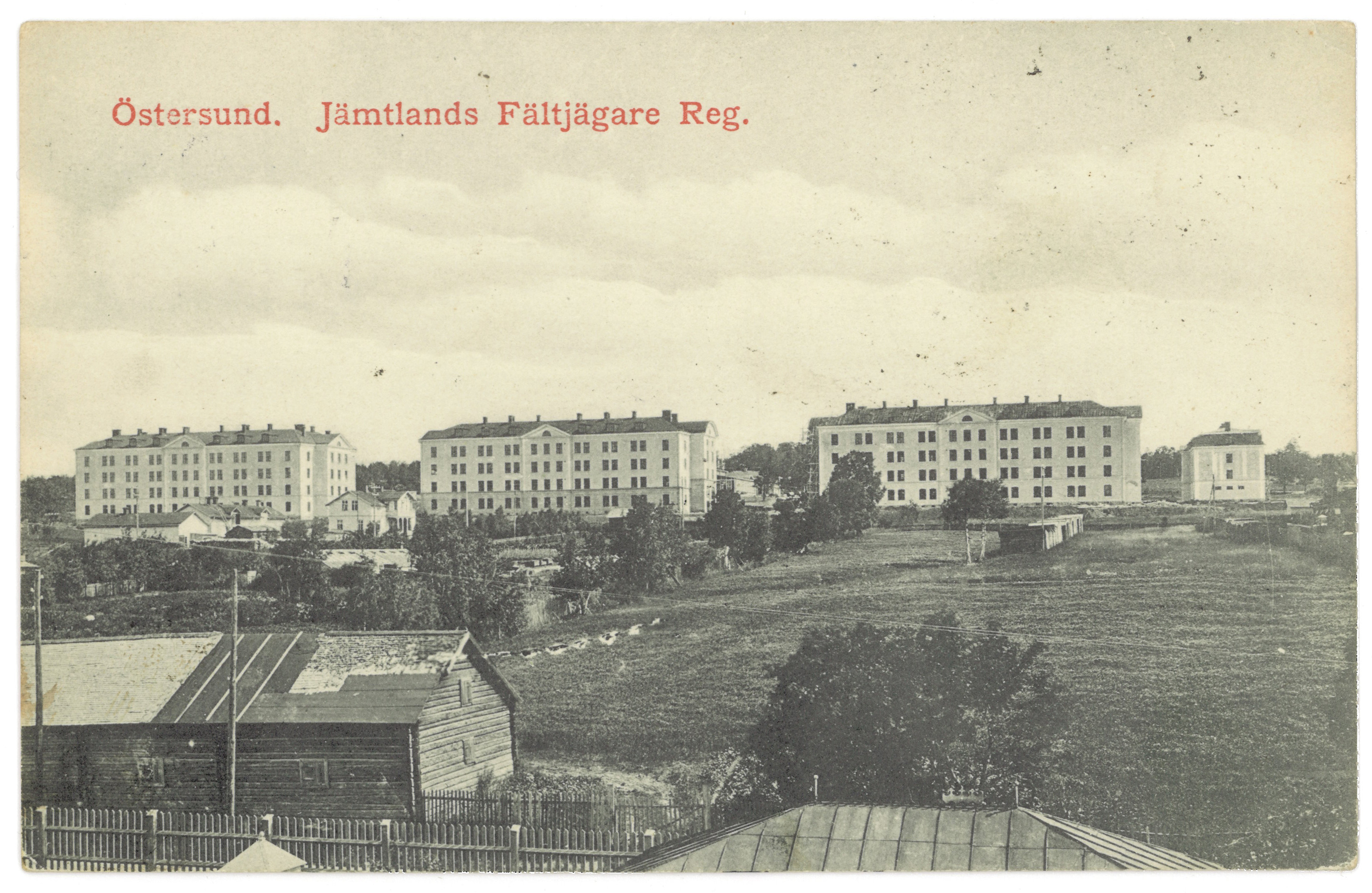
The barracks of 1910.

Between 21 December 1687 and 15 August 1926, the regiment was trained at Frösö military camp. On 7 October 1905, the regiment's schools were moved to the Gamla skolan ("Old School") (Västra skolan, "Western School") at Rådhusgatan 44. In the autumn of 1910, the regiment moved into a newly established barracks at Fältjägargränd 13. The barracks were drawn by Erik Josephson, and was built after the 1901 military order's building program after Fortifikationen's design for infantry barracks. On 8 April 1911, the regiment commemorated the moving to Östersund through a moving ceremony. After the regiment was disbanded and commenced its decommissioning, the barracks area was left on 31 August 2006.

=== Training areas ===
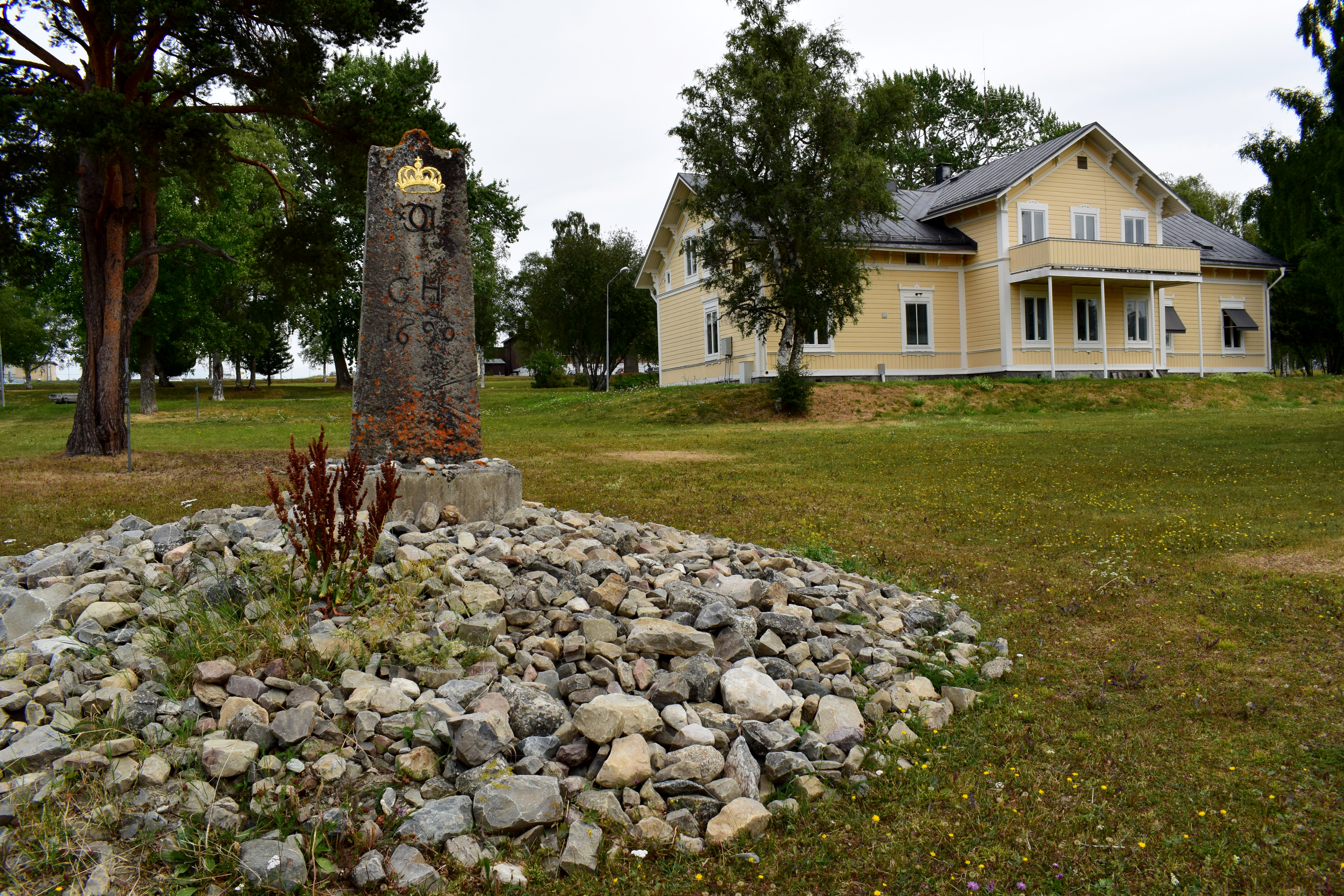
Memorial stone at Frösö camp raised in 1690.

From 1687 to 1926, the regiment was based and trained at Frösö military camp. The regiment later trained at Grytans training area. The administration of the training area was under Norrland Artillery Regiment (A 4). After Norrland Artillery Regiment was disbanded in 1997, Jämtland Rifle Regiment took over the responsibility of the administration.

== Heraldry and traditions ==
=== Colours, standards and guidons ===
The Jämtland Rifle Regiment (I 5) presents one regimental colour and two battalion colours:

==== Colour of the Jämtland Rifle Regiment ====
The I 5 colour was drawn by Kristina Holmgård-Åkerberg and embroidered by machine in insertion technique by the company Libraria. The colour was presented to the regiment at the regimental barracks in Östersund by His Majesty the King Carl XVI Gustaf on 24 August 1996. Blazon: "On blue cloth the provincial badge of Jämtland; a white elk passant, attacked on its back by a rising falcon and in the front by a rampant dog, both yellow; all animals armed red. On a white border at the upper side of the colour, battle honours in blue." Battle honours: Nowodwor (1655).

==== Colour of the Rifle Battalion ====
The battalion colour of the Rifle Battalion (Fältjägarbataljonen) was drawn by Kristina Holmgård-Åkerberg and embroidered by machine in insertion technique by Maj-Britt Salander/company Blå Kusten. The colour was presented to the Jämtland Rifle Brigade (Fältjägarbrigaden, NB 5) at the regimental barracks in Östersund by His Majesty the King Carl XVI Gustaf on 24 August 1996. It was used by NB 5 until 1 July 2000. Blazon: "On blue cloth the provincial badge of Jämtland; a white elk passant, attacked on its back by a rising falcon and in the front by a rampant dog, both yellow; all animals armed red. On a white border at the upper side of the colour, battle honours and close to the staff a flying eagle, all blue."

==== Colour of the Norrland Logistic Battalion ====
The colour of the Norrland Logistic Battalion (Trängbat/I 5), was drawn by Ingrid Lamby and embroidered by machine in insertion technique by the Engelbrektsson Flag factory. The colour was presented to the then Norrland Logistic Corps (T 3) at the Artillery Yard in Stockholm by the Chief of Army Staff, Lieutenant General Åke Sagrén on 21 October 1995. It was used as regimental colour by T 3 until 1 June 2000. Blazon: "On light blue cloth in the middle, on a circular shield, the lesser coat of arms of Sweden according to the law, the shield surrounded by white tongues and rays. In the first corner the reindeer of the provincial badge of Västerbotten; white with red arms."

=== Coat of arms ===
The coat of the arms of the Jämtland Rifle Regiment (I 5/Fo 22) 1977–1994, the Jämtland Rifle Brigade (Fältjägarbrigaden, NB 5) 1994–2000 and the Jämtland Rifle Regiment (I 5) 2000–2004. Blazon: "Azure, the provincial badge of Jämtland, a moose passant argent, attacked on the back by a rising hawk and in the front by a dog rampant both or; all animals armed and langued gules. The shield surmounted two muskets in saltire or". The coat of arms of the Jämtland Rifle Regiment (I 5/Fo 22) 1994–2000 and the Jämtland Group (Jämtlandsgruppen) since 2000. Blazon: "Azure, the provincial badge of Jämtland, an elk passant argent, attacked on the back by a rising falcon and in the front by a dog rampant both or; all animals armed and langued gules. The shield surmounted two swords in saltire or".

Coat of arms of the Jämtland Rifle Regiment (I 5/Fo 22) 1977–1994, the Jämtland Rifle Brigade (Fältjägarbrigaden, NB 5) 1994–2000 and the Jämtland Rifle Regiment (I 5) 2000–2004.

Coat of the arms of the Jämtland Rifle Regiment (I 5/Fo 22) 1994–2000 and the Jämtland Group (Jämtlandsgruppen) 2000–present.

=== Medals ===
In connection with the disbandment of the regiment in 2005, the Jämtlands fältjägarremente och Östersunds garnisons minnesmedalj ("Jämtland Rifle Regiment and Östersund Garrison Commemorative") in silver (JämtfältjägregMSM) was established.

Medal ribbon

=== Other ===
The regiment's anniversary was 20 September, as a memory of the Battle of Nowodwor on 20 September 1655. The battle honour is shared with Norrland Dragoon Regiment and later with the Army Ranger Battalion.

The regiment's twin unit was the Savo Brigade of the Finnish Army; now disbanded.

== Commanding officers ==
Regimental commanders active at the regiment 1687–1997 and 2000–2005. The years 1983-1990 the regiment was a part of Östersund Army Garrison (ÖAG). For the years 1998-2000, see Fältjägarbrigaden.

=== Commanders ===
- 1687–1705: C Hård af Segerstad
- 1704–1705: B Ribbing (acting)
- 1705–1710: B Ribbing
- 1710–1717: M Planting-Bergloo
- 1717–1725: R H Horn
- 1725–1739: J Svinhufvud
- 1739–1751: Gotthard Wilhelm Marcks von Würtenberg
- 1751–1760: J Hastfer
- 1760–1762: H Wright
- 1762–1763: Carl Sparre
- 1763–1765: C O von Segebaden
- 1765–1766: C C von Blixen
- 1766–1768: C Hierta
- 1769–1769: F Ehrensvärd
- 1769–1769: C G Strömsköld
- 1769–1769: CC Ekeblad
- 1770–1770: Gustaf Adolf von Siegroth
- 1770–1775: Samuel Gustaf Stierneld
- 1775–1776: G A Torwigge
- 1776–1785: Carl Adam Wachtmeister
- 1785–1785: L P Almfelt
- 1785–1791: A L Lewenhaupt
- 1791–1792: G Gyllengranat
- 1792–1802: G G Hierta
- 1802–1805: Johan Henrik Tawast
- 1805–1813: Nils Gyldenstolpe
- 1813–1817: Johan Fredrik Eek
- 1817–1818: Nils Gyldenstolpe
- 1818–1821: Gustaf Abraham Peyron
- 1821–1821: G A Koskull
- 1821–1824: Carl Henrik Gyllenhaal
- 1824–1844: J F Boy
- 1844–1853: G M D F Armfelt
- 1854–1862: C A P Ström
- 1862–1875: C H H Mörner
- 1875–1879: Axel Ryding
- 1879–1884: Herman von Hohenhausen
- 1884–1888: O G Nordenskjöld
- 1888–1891: Lieutenant Colonel Jesper Crusebjörn
- 1891–1894: H F Gyllenram
- 1894–1897: W A G Nisbeth
- 1897–1904: F I von Heland
- 1904–1912: Axel Tauvon
- 1912–1917: Vilhelm Rappe
- 1917–1928: Colonel Gösta Lilliehöök
- 1928–1931: Gösta Törngren
- 1931–1937: Karl Beskow
- 1937–1942: Nils Stenbeck
- 1942–1949: Colonel Carl-Oscar Agell
- 1949–1960: Nils Erik Bouveng
- 1960–1961: Colonel Carl Eric Almgren
- 1961–1968: Karl Johan F:son Sergel
- 1968–1979: Sture Gustav Fornwall
- 1979–1983: Senior colonel Jan Erik Bertil Liedgren
- 1983–1984: Karl-Evert Englund
- 1984–1990: Jan Leif Arne Nilsson
- 1990–1991: Markku Samuli Sieppi
- 1991–1994: Christer Franzén
- 1994–1994: Gustaf Ingvar Gustafsson
- 1994–1997: Per Ove Fahlén
- 1998–2000: See Fältjägarbrigaden
- 2000–2003: Colonel Anders Brännström
- 2003–2005: Per-Eric Gustavsson

=== Deputy commanders ===
- 1979–1983: Colonel Karl-Evert Englund
- 1984–1985: Colonel Karl-Evert Englund

== Names, designations and locations ==
Name	Translation	From		To
Kungl. Ångermanlands, Medelpads och Jämtlands regemente	Royal Ångermanland, Medelpad and Jämtland Regiment	1646-01-16	–	1660-??-??
Kungl. Jämtlands regemente till fot	Royal Jämtland Regiment of Foot	1670-??-??	–	1689-??-??
Kungl. Jämtlands dragonregemente	Royal Jämtland Dragoon Regiment	1689-??-??	–	1770-??-??
Kungl. Jämtlands infanteriregemente	Royal Jämtland Infantry Regiment	1770-??-??	–	1820-02-07
Kungl. Jämtlands fältjägarregemente	Royal Jämtland Rifle Regiment	1820-02-08	–	1853-05-24
Kungl. Jämtlands fältjägarkår	Royal Jämtland Rifle Corps	1853-05-25	–	1892-12-31
Kungl. Jämtlands fältjägarregemente	Royal Jämtland Rifle Regiment	1893-01-01	–	1974-12-31
Jämtlands fältjägarregemente	Jämtland Ranger Regiment / Jämtland Commando Regiment	1975-01-01	–	1997-12-31
Jämtlands fältjägarregemente	Jämtland Ranger Regiment / Jämtland Commando Regiment	2000-07-01	–	2004-12-31
Avvecklingsorganisation	Disbandment Organization	2005-01-01	–	2006-08-31
Jämtlands fältjägarkår	Jämtland Rifle Corps	2021-10-01	–	
Designation		From		To
No. 23		1816-10-01	–	1914-09-30
I 23		1914-10-01	–	1927-12-31
I 5		1928-01-01	–	1974-06-30
I 5/Fo 22		1974-07-01	–	1983-06-30
I 5		1990-07-01	–	1994-06-30
I 5/Fo 22		1994-07-01	–	1997-12-31
I 5		2000-07-01	–	2004-12-31
AO I 5		2005-01-01	–	2006-08-31
I 21/FJK		2021-10-01	–	
Location		From		To
Frösö läger		1682	–	1911-09-30
Östersund		1911-10-01	–	2006-08-31
Östersund		2021-10-01	–	

== See also ==
- List of Swedish infantry regiments
