= Larie =

Larie is a surname. Notable people with the surname include:

- Anna Larie, Romanian canoeist
- Ionuț Larie (born 1987), Romanian footballer
