= Wojciech Kurpiewski =

Polish canoeist

Personal information
- Full name: Wojciech Sławomir Kurpiewski
- Born: 16 February 1966 Nowy Dwór Mazowiecki, Polish People’s Republic
- Died: 8 October 2016 (aged 50) Providence, Rhode Island, U.S.
Medal record
Men's canoe sprint
Event	1st	2nd	3rd
Olympic Games	0	1	0
World Championships	0	3	2
European Championships	0	0	0
Total	0	4	2
Olympic Games
Silver medal – second place	1992 Barcelona	K-2 500 m
World Championships
Silver medal – second place	1987 Dusiburg	K-4 500 m
Silver medal – second place	1989 Plovdiv	K-4 1000 m
Silver medal – second place	1993 Copenhagen	K-2 500 m
Bronze medal – third place	1986 Montreal	K-4 1000 m
Bronze medal – third place	1989 Plovdiv	K-2 500 m
Summer Universiade
Gold medal – first place	1987 Zagreb	K-4 500 m
Silver medal – second place	1987 Zagreb	K-4 1000 m
Bronze medal – third place	1987 Zagreb	K-2 500 m
- Updated on 10 October 2016

Wojciech Sławomir Kurpiewski (16 February 1966 – 8 October 2016) was a Polish canoe sprinter who competed from the mid-1980s to the mid-1990s. Kurpiewski was born in Nowy Dwór Mazowiecki.

Competing in two Summer Olympics, he won a silver medal in the K-2 500 m event at Barcelona in 1992.

Kurpiewski also won five medals at the ICF Canoe Sprint World Championships with three silvers (K-2 500 m: 1993, K-4 500 m: 1987, K-4 1000 m: 1989) and two bronzes (K-2 500 m: 1989, K-4 1000 m: 1986). He died at the age of 50 on 8 October 2016.
