= Canoeing at the 1987 Summer Universiade =

Canoeing at the XIV Summer Universiade
- Venue: Rowing Centre

Canoeing was contested at the 1987 Summer Universiade in Zagreb, Yugoslavia. Canoe sprint was the only discipline of canoeing contested.

== Medal summary ==
=== Medal table ===
Rank	Nation	Gold	Silver	Bronze	Total
1	Romania (ROU)	5	5	3	13
2	Soviet Union (URS)	2	5	1	8
3	Poland (POL)	2	1	2	5
4	West Germany (FRG)	1	1	0	2
5	Hungary (HUN)	1	0	3	4
6	Norway (NOR)	1	0	0	1
6	United States (USA)	1	0	0	1
8	Canada (CAN)	0	1	1	2
9	Italy (ITA)	0	1	0	1
10	Bulgaria (BUL)	0	0	1	1
10	Yugoslavia (YUG)	0	0	1	1
Totals (11 entries)		13	14	12	39

=== Men's events ===
Event	Gold	Silver	Bronze
C1 500 m	Aurel Macarencu; Romania	Aleksandr Kalnitzhenko; Soviet Union	Raycho Karmadzhiev; Bulgaria
C1 1000 m	Aurel Macarencu; Romania	Aleksandr Kalnitzhenko; Soviet Union	Ivan Šabjan; Yugoslavia
C2 500 m	Soviet Union (URS); Yuriy Gurin; Valeriy Veshko	Romania (ROU); Vasile Lehaci; Gheorghe Andriev	Hungary (HUN); Béla Szigethy; György Salanky
C2 1000 m	Soviet Union (URS); Yuriy Gurin; Valeriy Veshko	Canada (CAN); David Frost; Eric Smith	Romania (ROU); Vasile Lehaci; Gheorghe Andriev
K1 500 m	Olney Kent; United States	Ionel Letcae; Romania	Attila Ábrahám; Hungary
K1 1000 m	Morten Ivarsen; Norway	Alessandro Pieri; Italy	Ionel Letcae; Romania
K2 500 m	Romania (ROU); Daniel Stoian; Angelin Velea	West Germany (FRG); Niels Ellwanger; Carsten Lömker	Poland (POL); Robert Chwiałkowski; Wojciech Kurpiewski
K2 1000 m	West Germany (FRG); Niels Ellwanger; Carsten Lömker	Romania (ROU); Daniel Stoian; Angelin Velea	Hungary (HUN); Béla Petrovics; Kálmán Petrovics
K4 500 m	Poland (POL); Andrzej Gajewski; Robert Chwiałkowski; Wojciech Kurpiewski; Grzegorz Krawców	Romania (ROU); Alexandru Popa; Ionel Letcae; Polocoser; Nicolae Feodosei	
K4 500 m	Poland (POL); Andrzej Gajewski; Robert Chwiałkowski; Wojciech Kurpiewski; Grzegorz Krawców	Soviet Union (URS); Sergey Kolokolov; Sergey Korneyevez; Uko Kirga; Anatoly Sekira	
K4 1000 m	Hungary (HUN); Attila Ábrahám; Zsolt Böjti; Béla Petrovics; Kálmán Petrovics	Poland (POL); Grzegorz Krawców; Robert Chwiałkowski; Wojciech Kurpiewski; Krzysztof Szczepański	Romania (ROU); Alexandru Popa; Ionel Constantin; Ionel Letcae; Nicolae Feodosei

=== Women's events ===
Event	Gold	Silver	Bronze
K1 500 m	Izabela Dylewska; Poland	Tecla Borcănea; Romania	Irina Khmelevskaya; Soviet Union
K2 500 m	Romania (ROU); Luminata Munteanu; Marina Ciucur	Soviet Union (URS); Nelli Korbukova; Tatyana Cheslova	Canada (CAN); Barbara Olmsted; Nancy Olmsted
K4 500 m	Romania (ROU); Tecla Borcănea; Marina Ciucur; Anna Larie; Luminata Munteanu	Soviet Union (URS); Nelli Korbukova; Tatyana Cheslova; Ekaterina Konyovskaya; Anzhela Nadtochayeva	Poland (POL); Izabela Dylewska; Bogumila Łącka; Beata Lewicka; Sylwia Stanny
