= Norrland Dragoon Regiment =

Swedish Army unit

Coordinates: 65°34′50″N 19°09′53″E

- Norrlands dragonregemente
- Active: 1646–present (lineage); 2021–present (current form)
- Country: Sweden
- Allegiance: Swedish Armed Forces
- Branch: Swedish Army
- Type: Cavalry (historical)
- Role: Special operations Arctic warfare
- Size: Regiment
- Part of: Army Staff (Note: The unit has been subordinate to the following units: 6th Military District (1853–1893); 6th Army Division (1893–1901); VI Army Division (1902–1927); Northern Army Division (1928–1936); Upper Norrland's Troops (1937–1942); VI. Milo (1942–1955); I 19 (1955–1976); Milo ÖN (1976–1993); Milo N (1993–2000); OPIL (2000–2004); Norrbotten Regiment (2005–2021))
- Garrison/HQ: Arvidsjaur
- Nicknames: Norrland's Dragoons; Blue Dragoons
- Colors: Blue and orange-yellow
- March: "Norrlands dragoners marsch" (Carlsson) (Note: The march was adopted in 1901 and was established in 1953 by Army Order 33/1953.)
- Anniversaries: 20 September
- Battle honours: Nowy Dwór (1655)

Commanders
- Current commander: COL Fredrik Andersson

Insignia
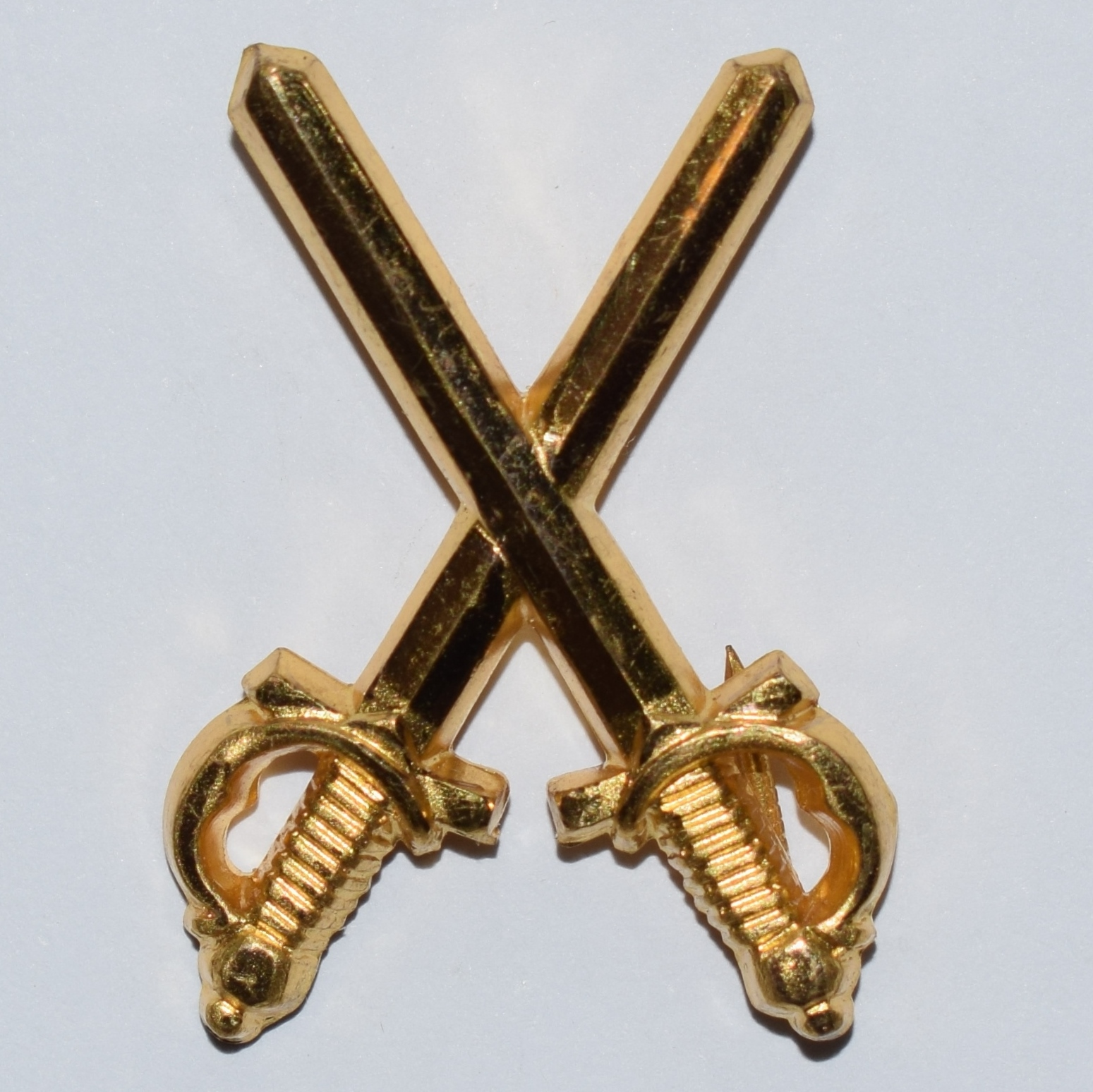
- Branch insignia

- Unit insignia

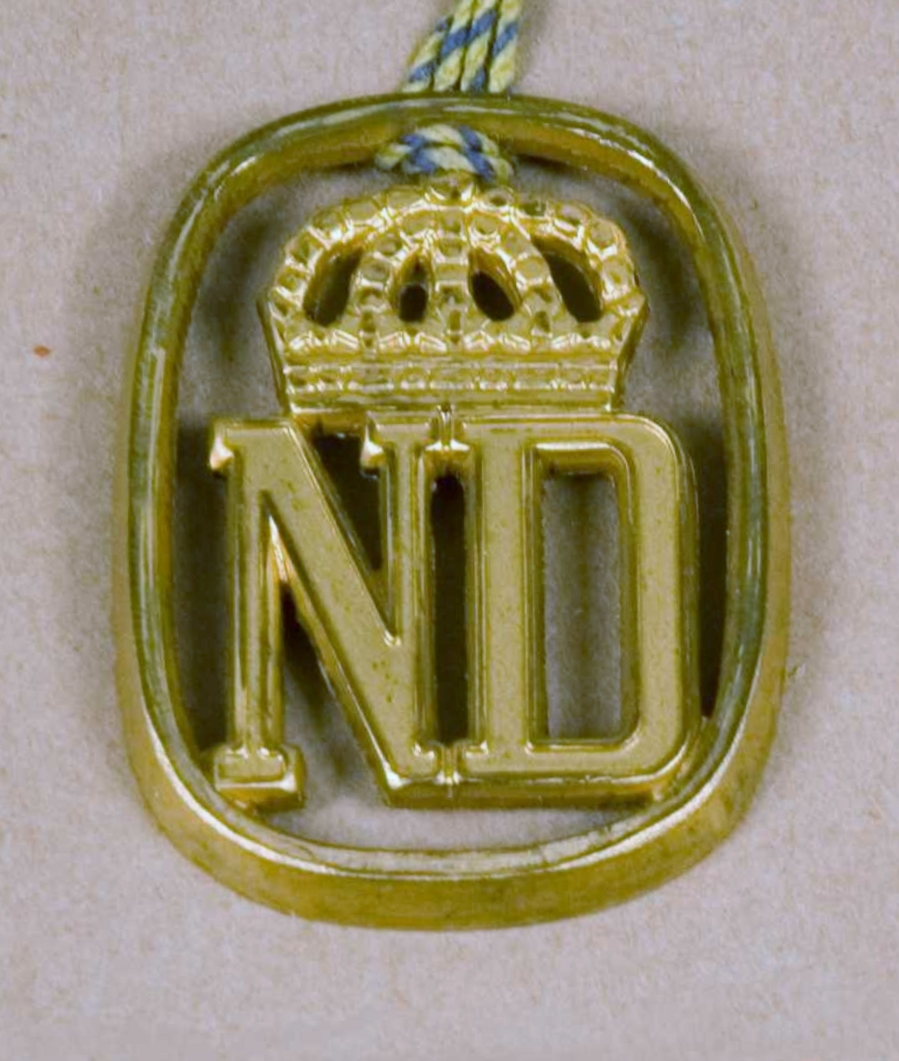
- Cap badge

The Norrland Dragoon Regiment (Swedish: Norrlands dragonregemente), also K 4, is a Swedish Army unit specialized in arctic warfare and special operations. Located in the province of Lappland, it was historically a cavalry unit that traces its origins back to the 17th century.

== History ==
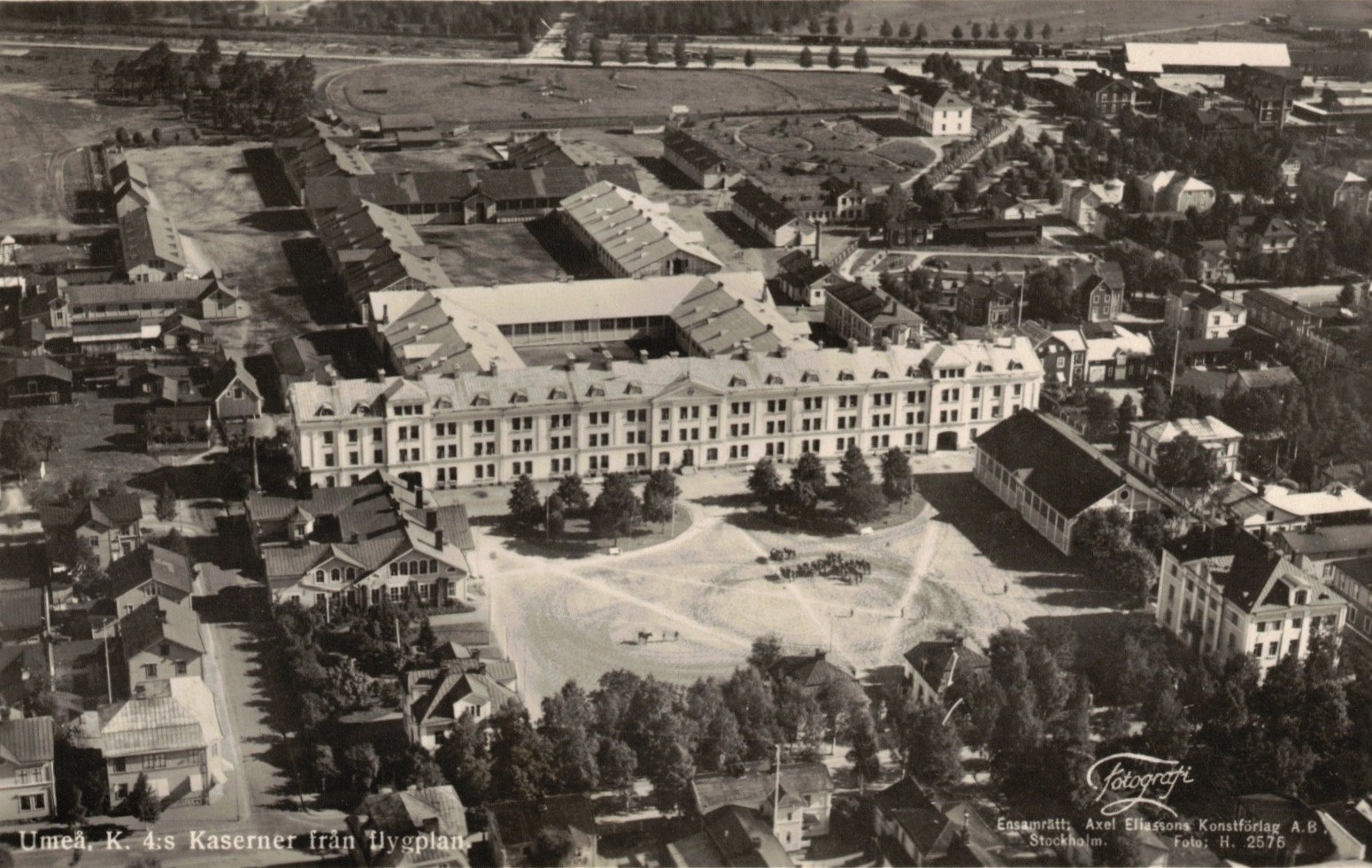
Royal Norrland Dragoon Regiment (K 4) in Umeå in 1934.

The regiment has its origin in the Ångermanland, Medelpad and Jämtland Regiment raised in 1646. From 1689 on, this regiment was named Jämtland Dragoon Regiment, but had only one company of cavalry troops. This company was semi-separate, with the name Jämtland Cavalry Company (Jämtlands kavallerikompani) and had been split off from Bohus-Jämtland Cavalry Squadron in 1670. The company was renamed Jämtlands hästjägarskvadron in 1802 and after receiving another squadron it was organized into a battalion and renamed Jämtlands hästjägarkår in 1834.

The corps gained full status as a separate unit in 1853 and was given the designation K 8 (8th Cavalry Regiment). It was renamed Norrland Dragoon Regiment in 1892 and when merged with parts of the Crown Prince's Hussar Regiment in 1927 it was redesignated K 4 but kept its name before being reorganized to a battalion and renamed Norrland's Dragoons in 1958. Finally the regiment was renamed back to its old name in 1980.

On 31 December 2004, Norrland Dragoon Regiment (K 4) was disbanded. From 1 January 2005 the regiment was transferred to a disbandment organization until the disbandment was completed by 30 June 2006. However, the training battalion at the regiment remained in the Swedish Armed Forces' basic organization and was placed in Norrbotten Regiment as the 193rd Ranger Battalion (AJB) with a permanent base in Arvidsjaur.

Since 2007 the battalion also has a mountain leader platoon which specializes in operations in and around mountainous and alpine terrain. This platoon has been of much use in Afghanistan since many weapons, drugs and the like are smuggled high up in the mountains there. The mountain leader platoon has also been involved in search and rescue operations domestically, such as the 2012 Norwegian C-130 crash.

The Army Ranger battalion have deployed to Bosnia, Kosovo, Afghanistan and Mali.

The unit was re-raised and was inaugurated on 24 September 2021. The inauguration was attended by His Majesty the King Carl XVI Gustaf, Prime Minister Stefan Löfven and the Supreme Commander of the Swedish Armed Forces, General Micael Bydén.

== Campaigns ==
- The Thirty Years' War 1647–1649
- The Northern Wars 1655–1658
- The Scanian War 1675–1679(?)
- The Great Northern War 1700–1721
- The Gustav III's Russian War 1788–1790
- The Finnish War 1808–1809
- The Campaign against Norway 1814

== Organization ==
1833

- Livskvadronen
- Alsens skvadron

See also the organization for Jämtland Ranger Regiment.

2022

- 41st Ranger Battalion, in Arvidsjaur
- 42nd Ranger Battalion, in Arvidsjaur

== Heraldry and traditions ==
=== Colours, standards and guidons ===
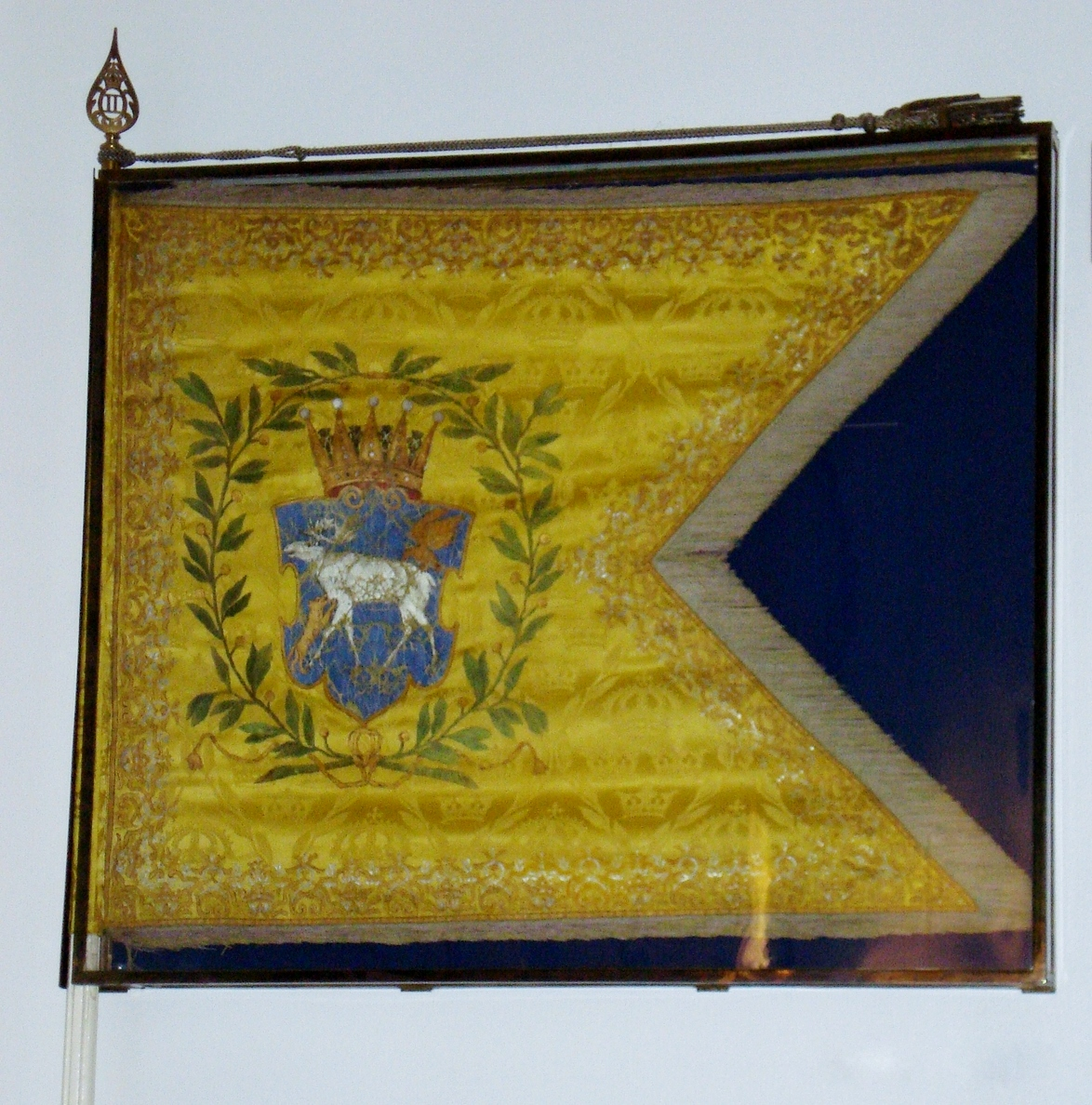
The 1902 guidon.

The unit presents one guidon. Its first was presented on 30 September 1902 by major general Carl Warberg. A new one was presented to the regiment by the Chief of the Army, lieutenant general, count Carl August Ehrenswärd at the regimental barracks in Umeå on 20 September 1955. The guidon is drawn by Brita Grep and embroidered by hand in insertion technique by the company Libraria. Blazon: "On swallow-tailed blue cloth the provincial badge of Jämtland; a white elk passant, attacked on its back by a rising falcon and in the front by a rampant dog, both yellow. On a white border at the upper side of the guidon, battle honours (Nowodwor 1655) in blue. Blue fringe." From 1957, the regimental letters as replaced from "NDR" to "ND", when the regiment was to be reduced to a battalion in 1958.

=== Coat of arms ===
The coat of the arms of the Norrland Dragoon Regiment (K 4) was used between 1977 and 2004. Blazon: "Azure, the provincial badge of Jämtland, an elk passant argent, attacked on the back by a rising falcon and in the front by a rampant dog both or; all animals armed and langued gules. The shield surmounted two rapiers in saltire or". Prior to the unit being re-raised in 2021, it received a new coat of arms similar to the old one. Blazon: "Azure, the provincial badge of Jämtland, an elk passant argent, attacked on the back by a rising falcon and in the front by a rampant dog both or; all animals armed and langued or. The shield surmounted two rapiers in saltire or".

Coat of arms of Norrland Dragoon Regiment (I 21/Fo 23) 1977–2004.

Coat of arms of the Norrland Dragoon Regiment (K 4) 2021–present.

=== Medals ===
In 2004, the Norrlands dragonregementes (K4) minnesmedalj ("Norrland Dragoon Regiment (K 4) Commemorative Medal") in silver (NorrldragMSM) was established. The medal ribbon was of blue moiré with an orange stripe on the middle.

=== Other ===
The regimental anniversary is 20 September, as a memory to the Battle of Nowy Dwór on 20 September 1655. The battle honour is shared with Jämtland Ranger Regiment (I 5).

== Commanding officers ==
Regimental commander 1893–1957 and 1980–2004. From 1957 to 1980, the unit was a training battalion where the commanding officer was called battalion commander and was subordinate to the commander officer of Västerbotten Regiment.

- 1893–1893: Knut Gillis Bildt (acting)
- 1893-1895: Gustaf Magnus Oskar Roger Björnstjerna
- 1895–1904: Gustaf Adolf Löwenhielm
- 1904–1914: Wilhelm Aschan
- 1914–1917: Adolf Adelswärd
- 1917–1919: Henric Ståhl
- 1919–1922: Axel Ahnström
- 1922–1930: Rickman von der Lancken
- 1930–1935: Archibald Douglas
- 1935–1940: Carl Björnstjerna
- 1940–1943: Sven Colliander
- 1943–1947: Henric Lagercrantz
- 1947–1951: Sven David Oskar Hermelin
- 1951–1952: James Axel John Maule
- 1952–1957: Carl Johan Wachtmeister
- 1957–1963: Gustaf William Frisén
- 1963–1972: Ingemar Bondeson
- 1972–1978: Claes Berthold Mikael Dieden
- 1978–1980: Per Blomquist
- 1980–1982: Per Blomquist
- 1982–1984: Lars Wallén
- 1984–1986: Per Stig Lennart Mohlin (acting)
- 1986–1989: Björn Lundquist
- 1989–1992: Mertil Melin
- 1992–1996: Johan Kihl
- 1996–2000: Frank Westman
- 2000–2003: Gunnar Söderström
- 2004–2005: Bengt Sandström
- 2005–2021: –
- 2021–2025: Teddy Larsson
- 2025–20xx: Fredrik Andersson

== Names, designations and locations ==
Name	Translation	From		To
Kungl. Norrlands dragonregemente	Royal Norrland Dragoon Regiment	1893-01-01	–	1958-06-30
Kungl. Norrlands dragoner	Royal Norrland Dragoons	1958-07-01	–	1974-12-31
Norrlands dragoner	Norrland Dragoons	1975-01-01	–	1980-03-31
Norrlands dragonregemente	Norrland Dragoon Regiment	1980-04-01	–	2004-12-31
Avvecklingsorganisation	Decommissioning Organisation	2005-01-01	–	2006-06-30
Norrlands dragonregemente	Norrland Dragoon Regiment	2021-09-24	–	
Designation		From		To
№ 8		1834-07-30	–	1914-09-30
K 8		1914-10-01	–	1927-12-31
K 4		1928-01-01	–	2004-12-31
K 4		2021-09-24	–	
Location		From		To
Frösö Camp		1893-01-01	–	1900-10-12
Umeå Garrison		1900-10-13	–	1980-03-31
Arvidsjaur		1980-04-01	–	2004-12-31
Arvidsjaur		2021-09-24	–	

== See also ==
- List of Swedish cavalry regiments
