= Agell =

Agell is a surname. Notable people with the surname include:

- Carl-Oscar Agell (1894–1983), Swedish Army officer
- Charlotte Agell (born 1959), American writer
- Karl Agell (born 1966), Canadian rock singer
- Pepe Agell (born 1984), Spanish entrepreneur
- José Agell (born 1882), Spanish chemist-physicist
