= Sergey Korneyevez =

Soviet canoeist

Personal information
- Born: 1962 (age 63–64)

Sport
- Sport: Canoe sprint
Medal record
Representing Soviet Union
World Championships
Silver medal – second place	1986 Montreal	K-2 10000 m
Summer Universiade
Silver medal – second place	1987 Zagreb	K-4 500 m

Sergey Korneyevez (born 1962) is a Soviet sprint canoer who competed in the late 1980s. He won a silver medal in the K-2 10000 m event at the 1986 ICF Canoe Sprint World Championships in Montreal.
