= 1986 ICF Canoe Sprint World Championships =

Canoeing event in Montreal

The 1986 ICF Canoe Sprint World Championships were held in Montreal, Canada at the Notre Dame Island. This is also where the canoeing and rowing competitions for the 1976 Summer Olympics took place.

The men's competition consisted of six Canadian (single paddle, open boat) and nine kayak events. Three events were held for the women, all in kayak.

This was the 20th championships in canoe sprint.

== Medals table ==
| Rank | Nation | Gold | Silver | Bronze | Total |
|---|---|---|---|---|---|
| 1 | Hungary (HUN) | 7 | 3 | 1 | 11 |
| 2 | Romania (ROU) | 3 | 3 | 2 | 8 |
| 3 | East Germany (GDR) | 2 | 3 | 2 | 7 |
| 4 | Great Britain (GBR) | 2 | 0 | 0 | 2 |
| 5 | Soviet Union (URS) | 1 | 6 | 3 | 10 |
| 6 | Poland (POL) | 1 | 1 | 1 | 3 |
| 7 | Bulgaria (BUL) | 1 | 0 | 2 | 3 |
| 7 | West Germany (FRG) | 1 | 0 | 2 | 3 |
| 9 | France (FRA) | 0 | 1 | 1 | 2 |
| 9 | Yugoslavia (YUG) | 0 | 1 | 1 | 2 |
| 11 | Denmark (DEN) | 0 | 0 | 2 | 2 |
| 12 | Australia (AUS) | 0 | 0 | 1 | 1 |
| Totals (12 entries) | | 18 | 18 | 18 | 54 |

== Medal summary ==
=== Men's ===
==== Canoe ====
| Event | Gold | Time | Silver | Time | Bronze | Time |
|---|---|---|---|---|---|---|
| C-1 500 m | Olaf Heukrodt (GDR) | | Aurel Macarencu (ROU) | | Nikolay Bukhalov (BUL) | |
| C-1 1000 m | Aurel Macarencu (ROU) | | Ivan Klementiev (URS) | | Ivan Šabjan (YUG) | |
| C-1 10000 m | Aurel Macarencu (ROU) | | Ivan Šabjan (YUG) | | Didier Hoyer (FRA) | |
| C-2 500 m | Hungary; János Sarusi Kis; István Vaskuti | | Soviet Union; Viktor Reneisky; Aleksandr Kalnitzhenko | | East Germany; Ulrich Papke; Ingo Spelly | |
| C-2 1000 m | Hungary; János Sarusi Kis; István Vaskuti | | Poland; Marek Łbik; Marek Dopierała | | West Germany; Wolfram Faust; Hartmut Faust | |
| C-2 10000 m | Poland; Marek Łbik; Marek Dopierała | | Romania; Dumitru Bețiu; Vasile Lehaci | | Denmark; Arne Nielsson; Christian Frederiksen | |

==== Kayak ====
| Event | Gold | Time | Silver | Time | Bronze | Time |
|---|---|---|---|---|---|---|
| K-1 500 m | Jeremy West (GBR) | | Zsolt Gyulay (HUN) | | Igor Nagayev (URS) | |
| K-1 1000 m | Jeremy West (GBR) | | Ferenc Csipes (HUN) | | Harry Nolte (GDR) | |
| K-1 10000 m | Ferenc Csipes (HUN) | | Bernard Brégeon (FRA) | | Stanislav Boreyko (URS) | |
| K-2 500 m | West Germany; Reiner Scholl; Thomas Pfrang | | Hungary; András Rajna; Attila Adrovicz | | Soviet Union; Viktor Pusev; Sergey Superata | |
| K-2 1000 m | Romania; Daniel Stoian; Angelin Velea | | East Germany; André Wohllebe; Frank Fischer | | Australia; Kerry Grant; Steven Wood | |
| K-2 10000 m | Hungary; Gábor Kulcsár; László Gindl | | Soviet Union; Sergey Korneyevez; Viktor Detkovskiy | | Romania; Daniel Stoian; Angelin Velea | |
| K-4 500 m | East Germany; Andreas Stähle; Frank Fischer; André Wohllebe; Jens Fiedler | | Soviet Union; Aleksandr Matushenko; Sergey Kirsanov; Nikolay Zhersen; Viktor Denisov | | West Germany; Gilbert Schneider; Detlef Schmidt; Volker Kreutzer; Thomas Reineck | |
| K-4 1000 m | Hungary; Ferenc Csipes; Zsolt Gyulay; László Fidel; Zoltán Kovács | | East Germany; Guido Behling; Hans-Jörg Bliesener; Jens Fiedler; Thomas Vaske | | Poland; Robert Chwiałkowski; Kazimierz Krzyżański; Grzegorz Krawców; Wojciech Kurpiewski | |
| K-4 10000 m | Soviet Union; Nikolay Oselez; Grigory Medvedev; Sergey Kislev; Aleksandr Akunichikov | | Romania; Ionel Constantin; Nicolae Feodosei; Ionel Letcae; Alexandru Dulău | | Hungary; Tibor Böjti; Tibor Helyi; László Nieberl; Kálmán Petrovics | |

=== Women's ===
==== Kayak ====
| Event | Gold | Time | Silver | Time | Bronze | Time |
|---|---|---|---|---|---|---|
| K-1 500 m | Vania Gesheva (BUL) | | Kathrin Giese (GDR) | | Yvonne Knudsen (DEN) | |
| K-2 500 m | Hungary; Katalin Povázsán; Erika Mészáros | | Soviet Union; Nelli Korbukova; Tatyana Zhistova | | Bulgaria; Vania Gesheva; Diana Paliski | |
| K-4 500 m | Hungary; Erika Géczi; Erika Mészáros; Rita Kőbán; Éva Rakusz | | Soviet Union; Nelli Korbukova; Anzhela Nadtochayeva; Tatyana Zhistova; Olga Slapina | | Romania; Tecia Borcaena; Luminata Munteanu; Marina Ciiucur; Anna Larie | |
