= Robert Chwiałkowski =

Polish sprint canoer

Personal information
- Born: 2 August 1965 (age 61) Kraków, Poland

Sport
- Sport: Canoe sprint
Medal record
Representing Poland
World Championships
Silver medal – second place	1987 Duisburg	K-4 500 m
Silver medal – second place	1989 Plovdiv	K-4 1000 m
Bronze medal – third place	1986 Montreal	K-4 1000 m
Summer Universiade
Gold medal – first place	1987 Zagreb	K-4 500 m
Silver medal – second place	1987 Zagreb	K-4 1000 m
Bronze medal – third place	1987 Zagreb	K-2 500 m

Robert Chwiałkowski (born 2 August 1965) is a Polish sprint canoer who competed in the late 1980s. He won three medals at the ICF Canoe Sprint World Championships with two silvers (K-4 500 m: 1987, K-4 1000 m: 1989) and a bronze (K-4 1000 m: 1986).
