= Nikolay Zhershen =

Medal record

Men's canoe sprint

World Championships
Silver medal – second place	1986 Montreal	K-4 500 m

Nikolay Zhershen is a Soviet sprint canoer who competed in the late 1980s. He won a silver medal in the K-4 500 m event at the 1986 ICF Canoe Sprint World Championships in Montreal.
