= Tecla Marinescu =

Romanian canoeist (born 1960)

Personal information
- Born: 4 January 1960 (age 66) Constanța, Romania

Sport
- Sport: Canoe sprint
Medal record
Representing Romania
Olympic Games
Gold medal – first place	1984 Los Angeles	K-4 500 m
World Championships
Bronze medal – third place	1983 Tampere	K-4 500 m
Bronze medal – third place	1986 Montreal	K-4 500 m
Summer Universiade
Gold medal – first place	1987 Zagreb	K-4 500 m
Silver medal – second place	1987 Zagreb	K-1 500 m

Tecla Marinescu-Borcănea (born 4 January 1960) is a Romanian sprint canoer who competed in the early 1980s. She won a gold medal in the K-4 500 m event at the 1984 Summer Olympics in Los Angeles.

Marinescu-Borcănea also won two bronze medals in the K-4 500 m event at the ICF Canoe Sprint World Championships, earning them in 1983 and 1986.
