= Aleksandr Akunichikov =

Soviet canoer (born 1959)

Medal record

Men's canoe sprint

Representing Soviet Union

World Championships
Gold medal – first place	1986 Montreal	K-4 10000 m

Aleksandr Akunichikov (born 16 August 1959 in Ural'sk, Kazakh SSR) is a Soviet sprint canoer who competed in the late 1980s. He won a gold medal in the K-4 10000 m event at the 1986 ICF Canoe Sprint World Championships in Montreal.
