= Nikolay Oselez =

Medal record

Men's canoe sprint

Representing Soviet Union

World Championships
Gold medal – first place	1986 Montreal	K-4 10,000 m

Nikolay Oselez is a Soviet sprint canoer who competed in the late 1980s. He won a gold medal in the K-4 10,000 m event at the 1986 ICF Canoe Sprint World Championships in Montreal.

In the 1990s he was a businessman in Russia. In the late 1990s he married the chief coach of the Russian synchronized swimming team.

Nikolay has two sons; the younger, Yegor Oseledets, is a prominent Russian hockey player.
