= Vasile Lehaci =

Romanian canoeist

Sport
- Sport: Canoe sprint
Medal record
Representing Romania
World Championships
Silver medal – second place	1986 Montreal	C-2 10000 m
Silver medal – second place	1990 Poznań	C-2 1000 m
Silver medal – second place	1990 Poznań	C-2 10000 m
Summer Universiade
Silver medal – second place	1987 Zagreb	C-2 500 m
Silver medal – second place	1987 Zagreb	C-2 1000 m

Vasile Lehaci is a Romanian sprint canoer who competed from the late 1980s to the early 1990s. He won three silver medals at the ICF Canoe Sprint World Championships (C-2 1000 m: 1990, C-2 10000 m: 1986, 1990).

== Personal life ==
Lehaci is the father of the Austrian canoeist Ana Roxana Lehaci.
