= Marina Ciucur =

Romanian sprint canoer

Sport
- Sport: Canoe sprint
Medal record
Representing Romania
World Championships
Bronze medal – third place	1986 Montreal	K-4 500 m
Summer Universiade
Gold medal – first place	1987 Zagreb	K-2 500 m
Gold medal – first place	1987 Zagreb	K-4 500 m

Daniela Marina Ciucur is a Romanian sprint canoer who competed in the late 1980s. She won a bronze medal in the K-4 500 m event at the 1986 ICF Canoe Sprint World Championships in Montreal.
