= Anzhela Nadtochayeva =

Personal information
- Born: 1961 (age 64–65)

Sport
- Sport: Canoe sprint
Medal record
Representing Canada
World Championships
Silver medal – second place	1986 Montreal	K-4 500 m
Summer Universiade
Silver medal – second place	1987 Zagreb	K-4 500 m

Anzhela Nadtochayeva (born 1961) is a Soviet sprint canoer who competed in the late 1980s. She won a silver medal in the K-4 500 m event at the 1986 ICF Canoe Sprint World Championships in Montreal.
