= Viktor Detkovskiy =

Soviet canoeist

Medal record

Men's canoe sprint

World Championships
Silver medal – second place	1986 Montreal	K-2 10000 m

Viktor Detkovskiy is a Soviet sprint canoer who competed in the late 1980s. He won a silver medal in the K-2 10000 m event at the 1986 ICF Canoe Sprint World Championships in Montreal, Quebec, Canada.
