= László Gindl =

Hungarian canoeist

Medal record

Men's canoe sprint

World Championships
Gold medal – first place	1986 Montreal	K-2 10000 m

László Gindl is a Hungarian sprint canoer who competed in the late 1980s. He won a gold medal in the K-2 10000 m event at the 1986 ICF Canoe Sprint World Championships in Montreal.
