= Sergey Kislev =

Medal record

Men's canoe sprint

Representing Soviet Union

World Championships
| Gold medal – first place | 1986 Montreal | K-4 10000 m |

Sergey Kislev (born 19 July 1960 in Kyiv, Ukrainian SSR) is a Soviet sprint canoer who competed in the late 1980s. He won a gold medal in the K-4 10000 m event at the 1986 ICF Canoe Sprint World Championships in Montreal.
