= Béla Petrovics =

Hungarian canoeist

Personal information
- Born: Nagymaros, Hungary

Sport
- Sport: Canoe sprint
Medal record
Representing Hungary
World Championships
Bronze medal – third place	1990 Poznań	K-2 1000 m
Bronze medal – third place	1990 Poznań	K-4 500 m
Bronze medal – third place	1991 Paris	K-2 1000 m
Summer Universiade
Gold medal – first place	1987 Zagreb	K-4 1000 m
Bronze medal – third place	1987 Zagreb	K-2 1000 m

Béla Petrovics is a Hungarian sprint canoer who competed in the late 1980s and early 1990s. He won three bronze medals at the ICF Canoe Sprint World Championships (K-2 1000 m: 1990, 1991; K-4 500 m: 1990).
