= Kerry Grant =

Australian canoeist

Medal record

Men's canoe sprint

World Championships
Bronze medal – third place	1986 Montreal	K-2 1000 m

Kerry Grant is an Australian canoe sprinter who competed in the late 1980s. He won a bronze medal in the K-2 1000 m event at the 1986 ICF Canoe Sprint World Championships in Montreal, Quebec, Canada.
