= Ionel Letcae =

Romanian sprint canoer

Personal information
- Born: July 13, 1961 (age 65) Galați, Galați County, Romania

Sport
- Sport: Canoe sprint
Medal record
Representing Romania
World Championships
| Gold medal – first place | 1983 Tampere | K-4 1000 m |
| Silver medal – second place | 1986 Montreal | K-4 10000 m |
Summer Universiade
| Silver medal – second place | 1987 Zagreb | K-1 500 m |
| Bronze medal – third place | 1987 Zagreb | K-1 1000 m |
| Bronze medal – third place | 1987 Zagreb | K-4 500 m |
| Bronze medal – third place | 1987 Zagreb | K-4 1000 m |

Ionel Letcae (sometimes listed as Ionel Leţcaie, born July 13, 1961) is a Romanian sprint canoer who competed in the mid-1980s. He won two medals at the ICF Canoe Sprint World Championships, a gold (K-4 1000 m, 1983) and a silver (K-4 10000 m, 1986).

Letcae also finished fourth in the K-4 1000 m event at the 1984 Summer Olympics in Los Angeles.
