= Tatyana Zhistova =

Soviet canoeist

Medal record

Women's canoe sprint

World Championships
Silver medal – second place	1986 Montreal	K-2 500 m
Silver medal – second place	1986 Montreal	K-4 500 m

Tatyana Zhistova is a Soviet sprint canoer who competed in the mid-1980s. She won two silver medals at the 1986 ICF Canoe Sprint World Championships in Montreal, earning them in the K-2 500 m and K-4 500 m events.
