= Carl-Oscar Agell =

Swedish Army officer (1894–1983)

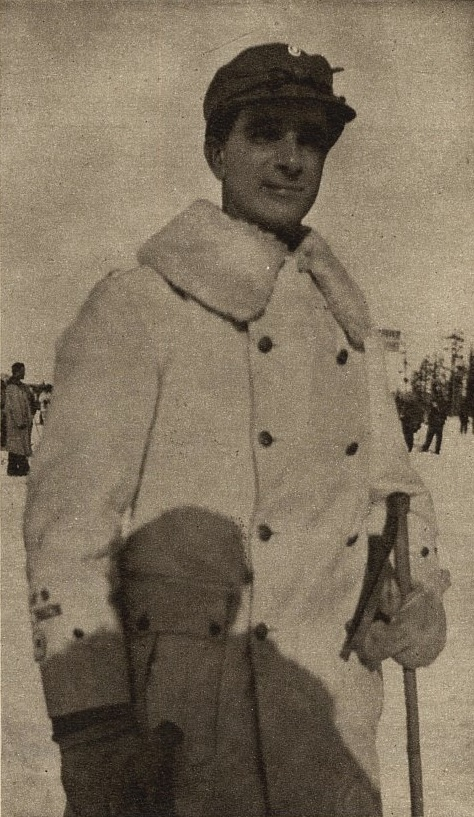
- Agell during the Winter War in 1940.
- Born: Carl-Oscar Agell; 29 August 1894; Hjo, Sweden
- Died: 12 December 1983 (aged 89); Uppsala, Sweden
- Military career
- Allegiance: Sweden
- Branch: Swedish Army
- Service years: 1915–1958
- Rank: Colonel
- Unit: Swedish Volunteer Corps
- Commands: Jämtland Ranger Regiment; Norrköping-Linköping Defence District; NNSC
- Conflicts: Winter War

Colonel Carl-Oscar Agell (29 August 1894 – 12 October 1983) was a Swedish Army officer. He served in Finland during the Winter War and back in Sweden he became commanding officer of the Jämtland Ranger Regiment. Agell headed the Swedish Delegation to the Neutral Nations Supervisory Commission and became the civil defence chief in Norrköping before retiring in 1958.

== Early life ==
Agell was born on 29 August 1894 in Hjo, Sweden, the son of Nils Andersson, a mill and saw owner, and his wife Blenda (née Samuelson). He passed the studentexamen in Växjö in 1913.

== Career ==
Agell was commissioned as an officer in 1915 and assigned as a second lieutenant to the Kronoberg Regiment. He was promoted to lieutenant in 1918 and to captain in 1930. Agell served on the General Staff in 1932 and with the Göta Life Guards (I 2) in 1935 and was promoted to major in 1936.

He was acting head of the Royal Military Academy in 1937 and became a lieutenant colonel in the Finnish Army as part of the Swedish Volunteer Corps during the Winter War in 1940. After Lieutenant Colonel Magnus Dyrssen was killed on 1 March 1940, Agell took command of the 1st Battlegroup. Back in Sweden, Agell was a lieutenant colonel with the Norrbotten Regiment (I 19) the same year. He was promoted to colonel two year later in 1942 and assumed command of the Jämtland Ranger Regiment (I 5) in 1942.

Agell was appointed commander of the Norrköping-Linköping Defence District (Norrköping-Lindköpings försvarsområde) in 1949 and was the head of the Swedish Delegation to the Neutral Nations Supervisory Commission from 1 May 1954 to 31 November 1955, with a temporary rank of major general. He then was the civil defence chief in Norrköping from 1956 to 1958.

== Personal life ==
In 1925, he married Anna-Lisa Lundbohm (born 1898), the daughter of managing director Ferdinand Lundbohm and Anna Möller. Agell was the father of Margaretha (born 1929), Christer (born 1931) and Elisabeth (born 1936). He was a member of Rotary International. Agell and his wife moved to Weda seat farm in Lästringe, Nyköping Municipality in July 1959 and then in the spring of 1964 they moved to Hörningsholm Castle, where they rented a villa in the castle's parkland.

== Awards and decorations ==
=== Swedish ===
- (Sweden) Commander 1st Class of the Order of the Sword (15 November 1949)
- (Sweden) Home Guard Medal of Merit in Gold
- (Sweden) Swedish Central Federation for Voluntary Military Training Medal of Merit in silver
- (Sweden) Jämtland County Shooting Federation's gold medal (Jämtlands läns skytteförbunds guldmedalj)
- (Sweden) Linköping Association for Volunteer Military Training's gold medal (Linköping's befäls (utbildnings) förbunds guldmedalj)
- (Sweden) Swedish Military Sports Association's silver medal (Sveriges militära idrottsförbunds silvermedalj)
- (Sweden) Swedish Women's Voluntary Defence Organization's silver medal (Sveriges lottakårers silvermedalj)
- (Sweden) Army Shooting Medal (Arméns skyttemedalj)

=== Foreign ===
- (Finland) 4th Class of the Order of the Cross of Liberty with swords
- (Finland) Finnish War Memorial Medal

Military offices
Preceded by Nils Stenbeck	Jämtland Ranger Regiment; 1942–1949	Succeeded by Nils Erik Bouveng
Preceded by Nils Ingvarsson	Heads of Swedish Delegation to the NNSC; 1 May 1954 – 31 November 1955	Succeeded by Nore Eriksson
