= Alexandru Popa (canoeist) =

Romanian sprint canoer (born 1968)

Personal information
- Born: Alexandru Popa; 12 June 1968 Romania

Sport
- Sport: Canoe sprint
Medal record
Representing Romania
Summer Universiade
Bronze medal – third place	1987 Zagreb	K-4 500 m
Bronze medal – third place	1987 Zagreb	K-4 1000 m

Alexandru Popa (born 12 July 1968) is a Romanian sprint canoer who competed in the early 1990s. At the 1992 Summer Olympics in Barcelona, he was eliminated in the semifinals of the K-2 1000 m event.
