= Nowy Dwór Mazowiecki =

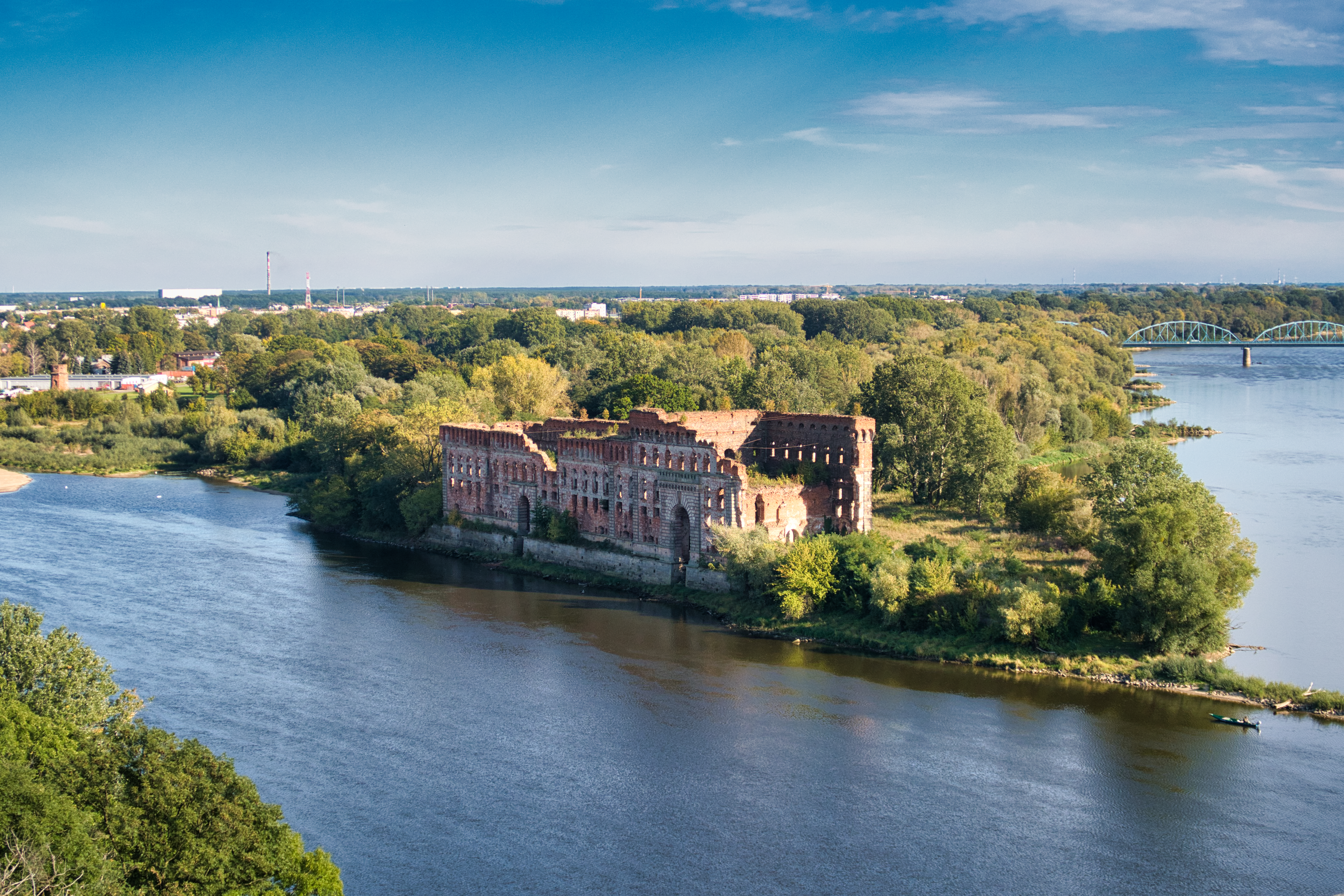
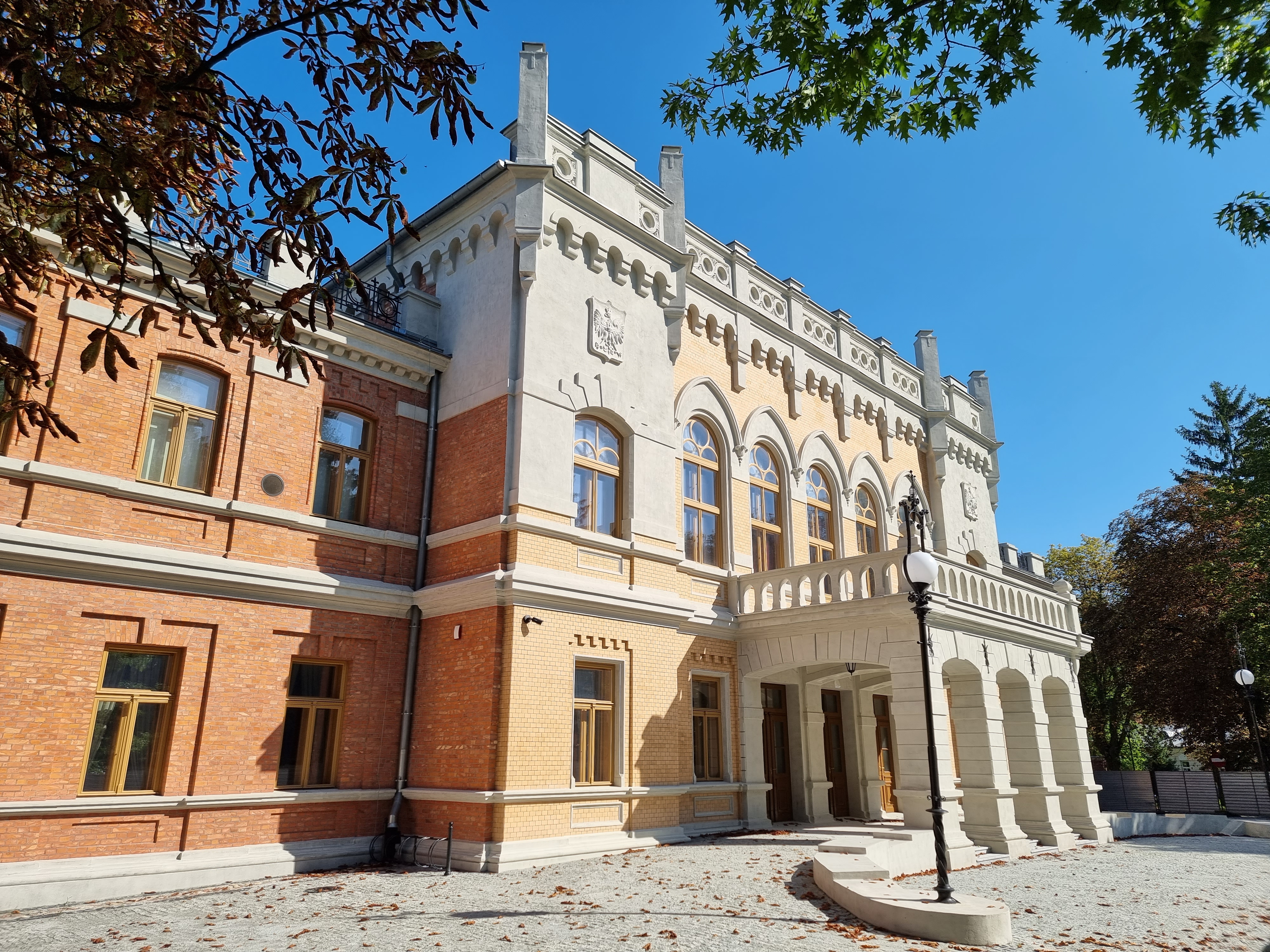
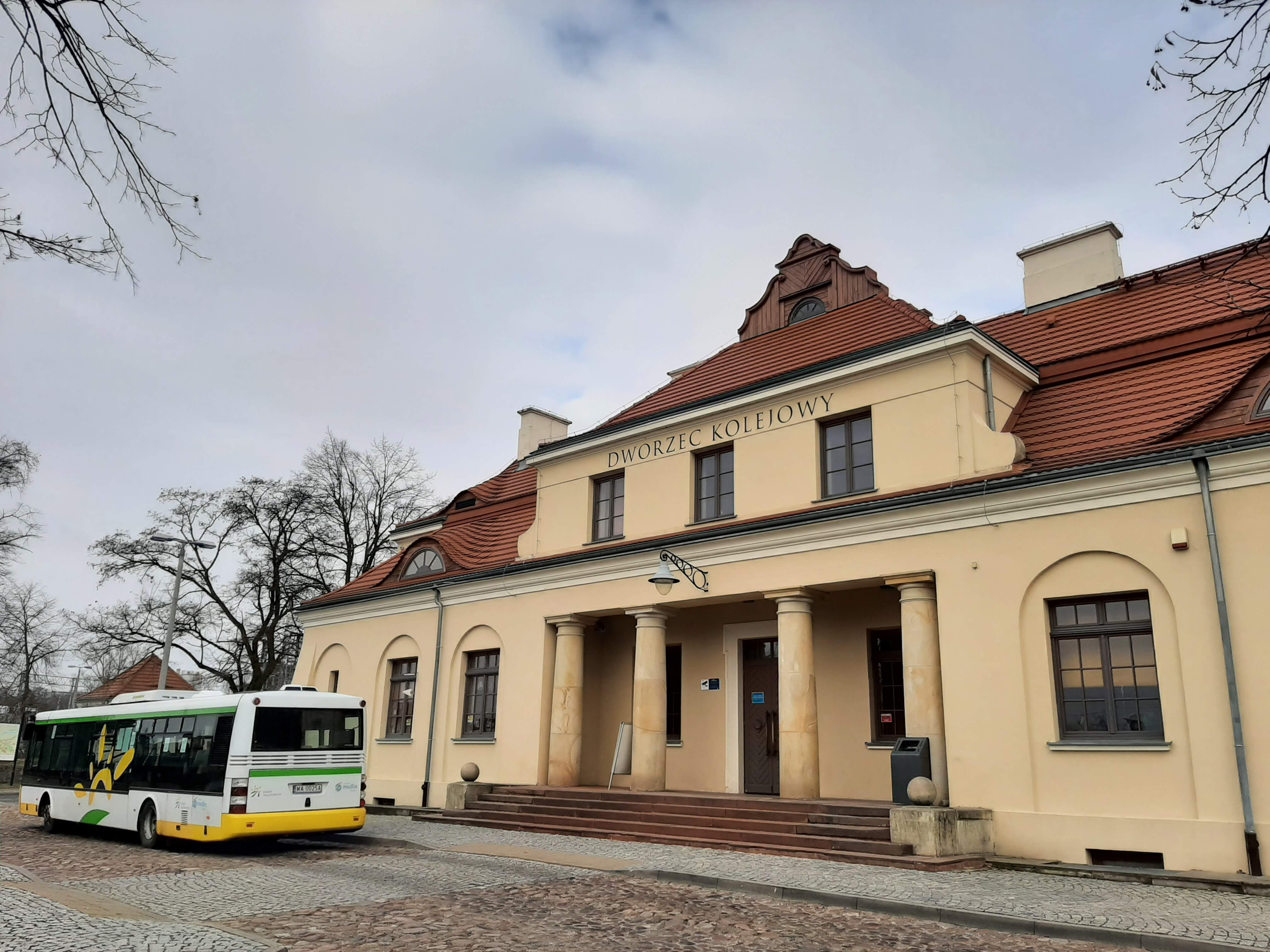
- Granary on the Narew River Officers Mess Main railway station

- Flag Coat of arms

- Location within Poland
- Coordinates: 52°26′N 20°41′E
- Country: Poland
- Voivodeship: Masovian
- County: Nowy Dwór
- Gmina: Nowy Dwór Mazowiecki (urban gmina)
- Established: before 1294
- Town rights: 1374

Government
  - Mayor: Sebastian Sosiński

Area
  - Total: 28.21 km^{2} (10.89 sq mi)

Population (2021)
  - Total: 28,564
  - Density: 1,012/km^{2} (2,620/sq mi)
- Time zone: UTC+1 (CET)
  - Summer (DST): UTC+2 (CEST)
- Postal code: 05-100
- Area code: +48 022
- Car plates: WND
- Website: www.nowydwormaz.pl

Nowy Dwór Mazowiecki (pronounced [ˈnɔvɨ ˈdvur mazɔˈvʲɛt͡skʲi]), often simply referred to as Nowy Dwór, is a town in east-central Poland in the Masovian Voivodeship with ca. 28500 inhabitants (2021). It is the capital of Nowy Dwór County. It is located in the northern part of the Warsaw metropolitan area.

Nowy Dwór Mazowiecki was founded in the medieval period. Due to its favourable location at the confluence of the Narew and Vistula rivers, it prospered as a trade center. It was industrialized in the late modern period. Due to its strategic location, it was the site of several battles and the Modlin Fortress, one of the largest fortresses in Poland, was erected there. The Warsaw Modlin Airport is located in Nowy Dwór Mazowiecki.

== History ==
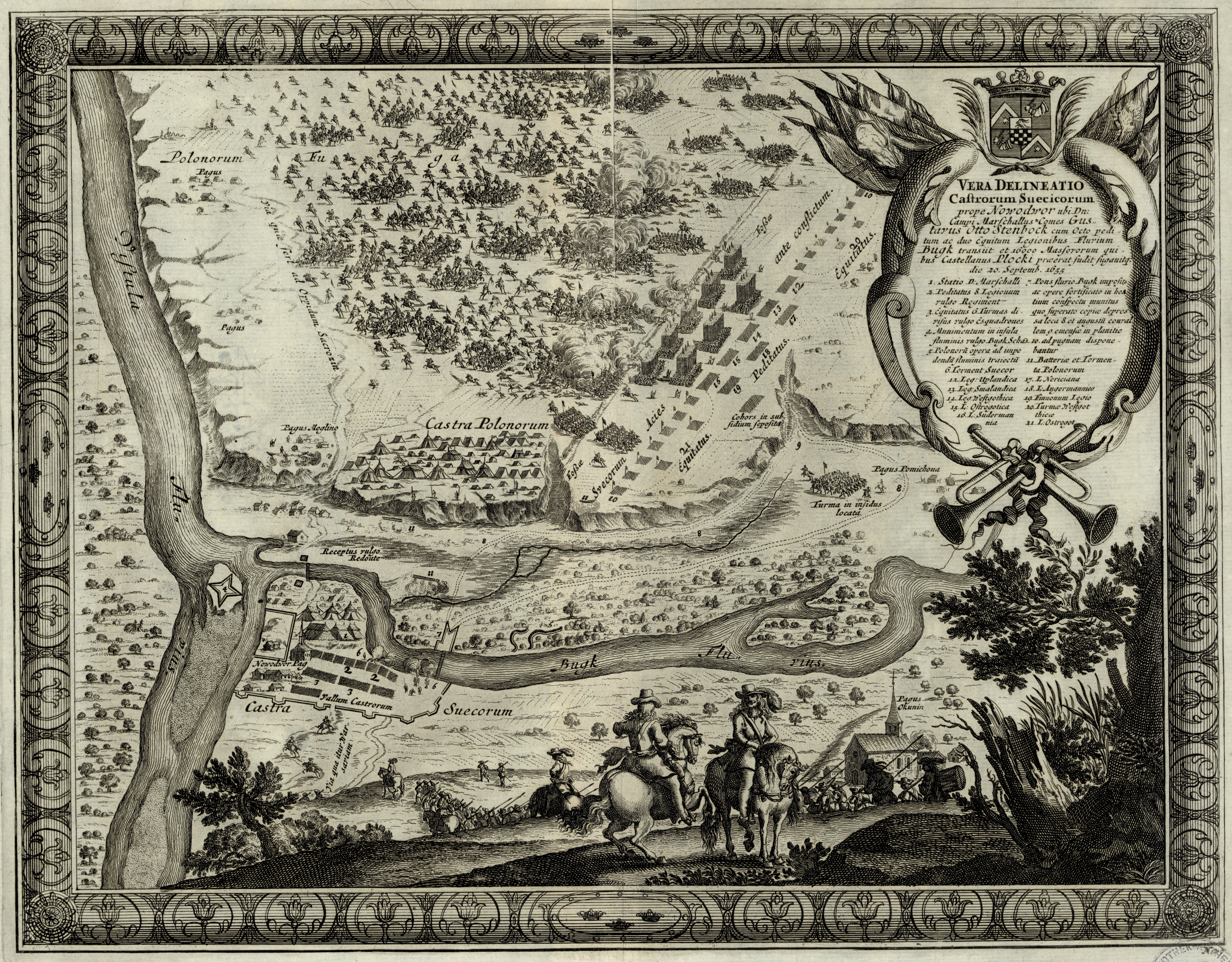
Battle of Nowy Dwór Mazowiecki (1655)

In 1355 Nowy Dwór was mentioned as one of the castles of Masovia. In 1374, Nowy Dwór was granted Chełmno town rights by Duke Siemowit III of the Piast dynasty. It was a private town of the Lubomirski, Poniatowski and Gutakowski noble families, administratively located in the Masovian Voivodeship in the Greater Poland Province of the Kingdom of Poland. It was the site of the Battle of Nowy Dwór Mazowiecki in 1655, during the Swedish invasion of Poland. During the early Industrial Revolution, Stanisław Poniatowski established a cloth factory in Nowy Dwór.

One of the districts of Nowy Dwór is Modlin, created from incorporating the former village of Modlin into the growing town in 1961. Modlin Fortress is now also part of the city. Many structures related to the fort can be seen in the Modlin district, including ruins from defensive structures designed by Napoleon Bonaparte and Tsarist Blocks built between 1899 and 1901 to house soldiers of the Russian army, and which are still in use as private flats today.

=== World War II ===
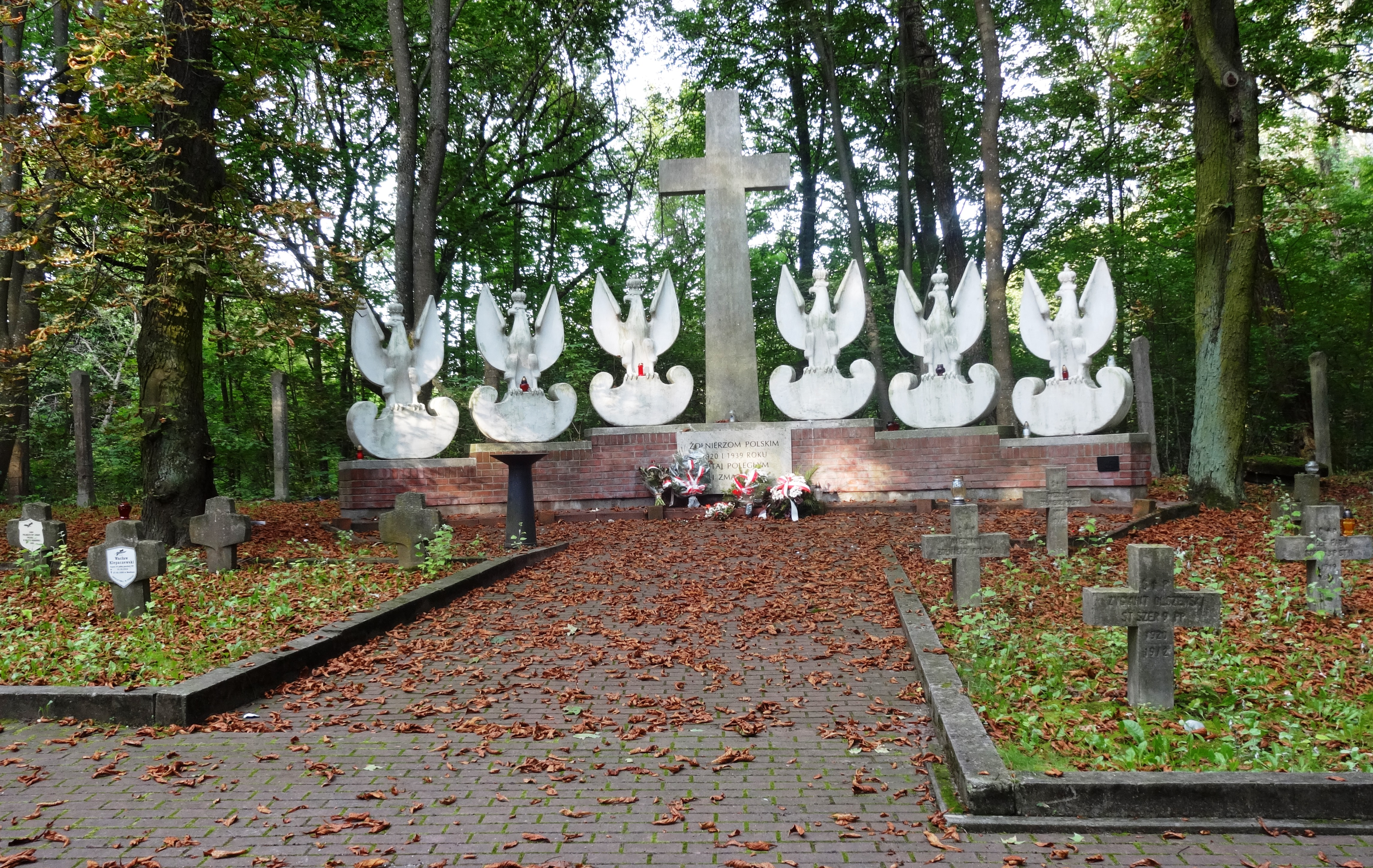
Military cemetery in Modlin

During the German-Soviet invasion of Poland, which started World War II in September 1939, the town was occupied by the Germans. They immediately began to persecute the Jewish population. Many Jews fled to Warsaw, others to Soviet occupied territory in the east. From 1941 to 1942, the Germans set up a ghetto between the four streets Nałęcza, Warszawska, Mazowiecka, and Piaskowa. Most of the 9000 or more Jewish inhabitants of the town were murdered. Some were murdered in the environs of the town; most were sent to Auschwitz concentration camp. Typhus was rampant in the ghetto taking many lives there. Only about 400 Nowy Dwor Jews survived; most of the survivors had fled to Soviet occupied territory and later to the Soviet Union itself, where they stayed throughout the war. Holocaust survivor Yehudis Pshenitse has recounted the efforts of a parish priest from Nowy Dwór to save her life after the murder of more than 2000 Jews in Rembertów ghetto in August 1942. Hiding her in his cellar, he gave her false papers identifying her as a Christian. Betrayed to the German occupying forces, the priest was tortured. He was released, but mortally wounded. Pshenitse described how he blessed her before dying: "Once again, he asked [his housekeeper] that I be hidden in a safe place, and then he died." The housekeeper took her to Modlin, where she was able to survive, living "by her own wits, posing as a Christian child."

The Israeli city of Holon has a Nowy Dwór Street (רחוב נובידבור). The name was given at the request of survivors of the Nowy Dwór Jewish community, who arrived in Holon after 1945.

== Sights ==
Nowy Dwór Mazowiecki is also renowned for its wooden architecture, which is still faintly visible within the city limits. Some of the wooden houses and villas date back to the late 18th century. The name Nowy Dwór itself, which literally means "New Manor" in English, relates to the manor-like architecture of the region.

== Sports ==
- Świt Nowy Dwór - football team (1st league in season 2003/2004)

== Gallery ==
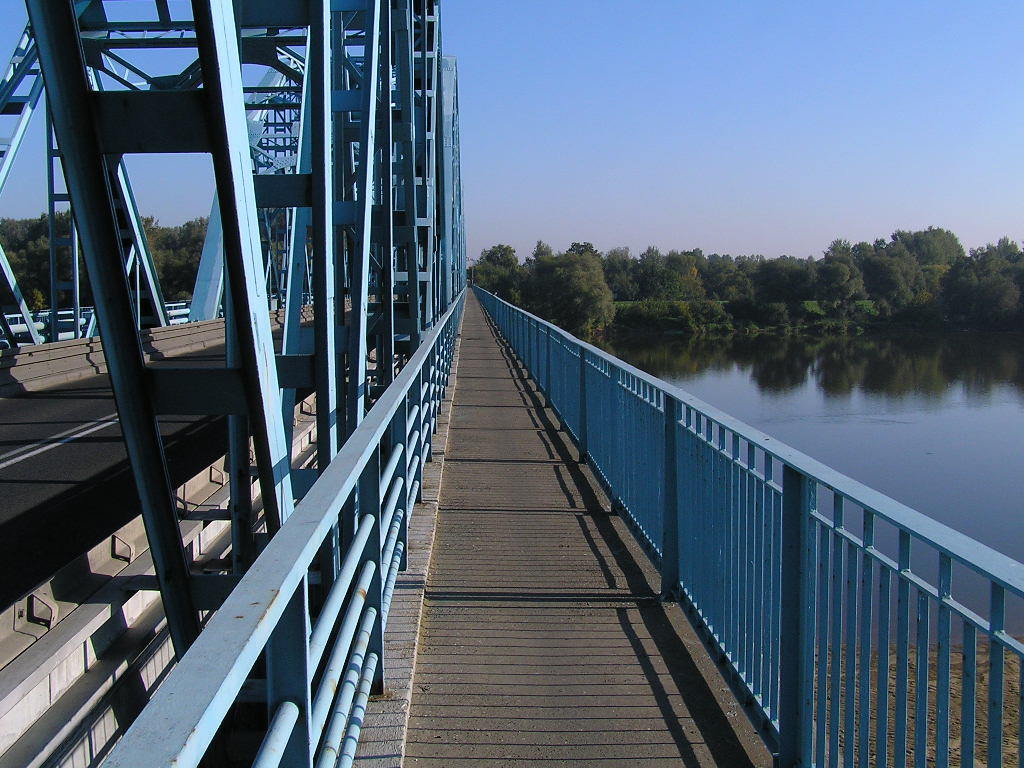
Piłsudski Bridge over the Vistula

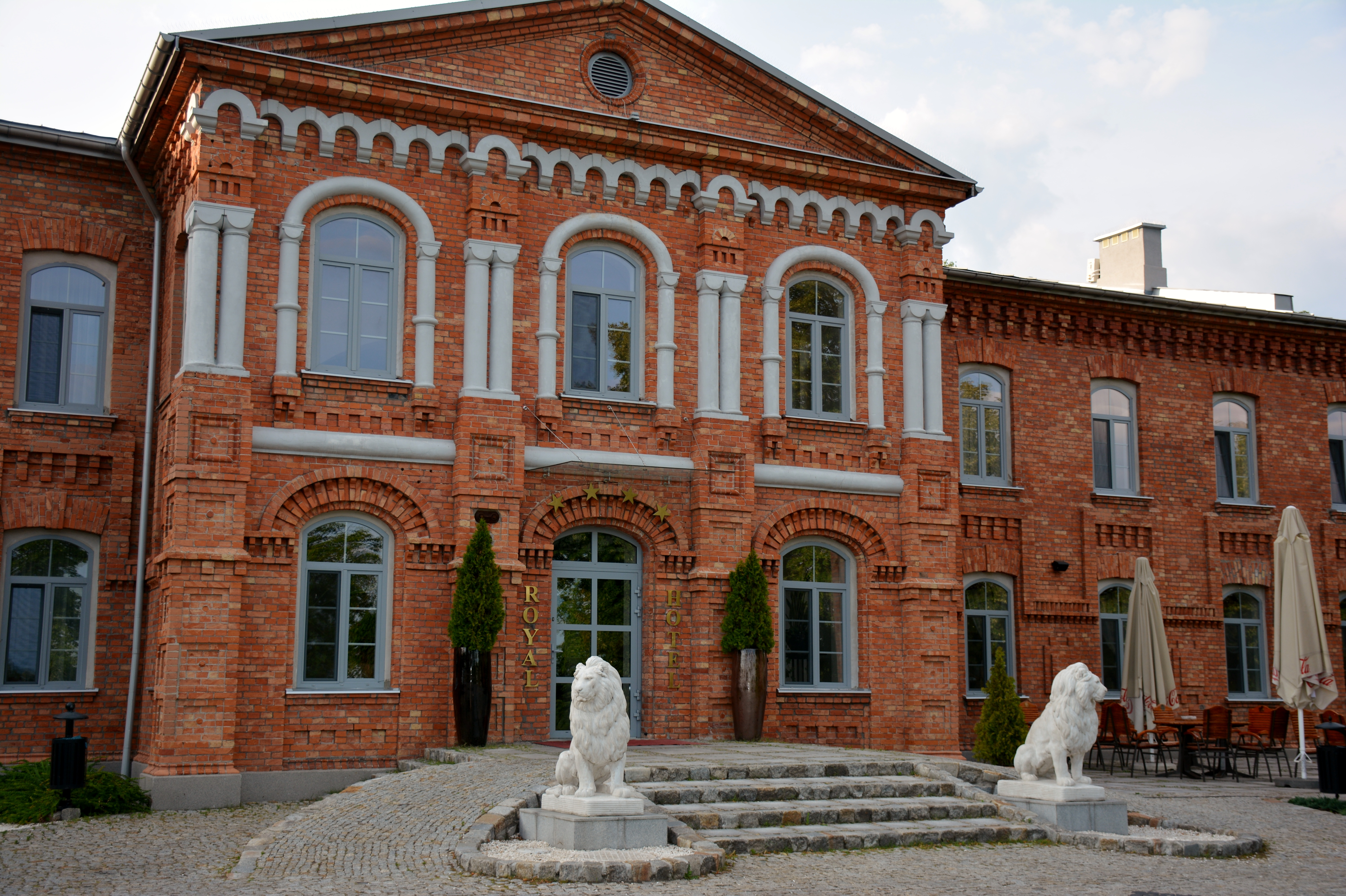
Royal Hotel

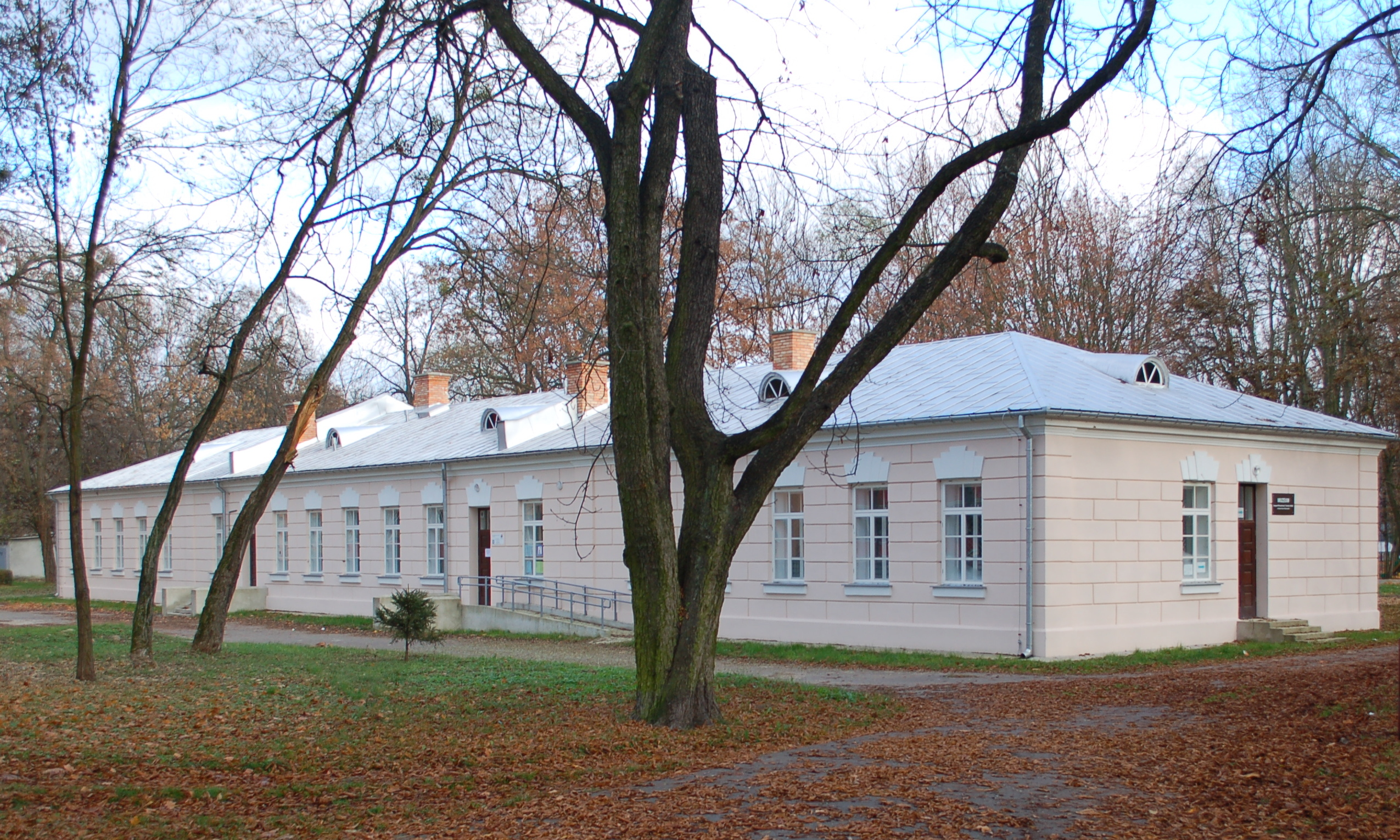
Museum of the 1939 September Campaign and Modlin Fortress

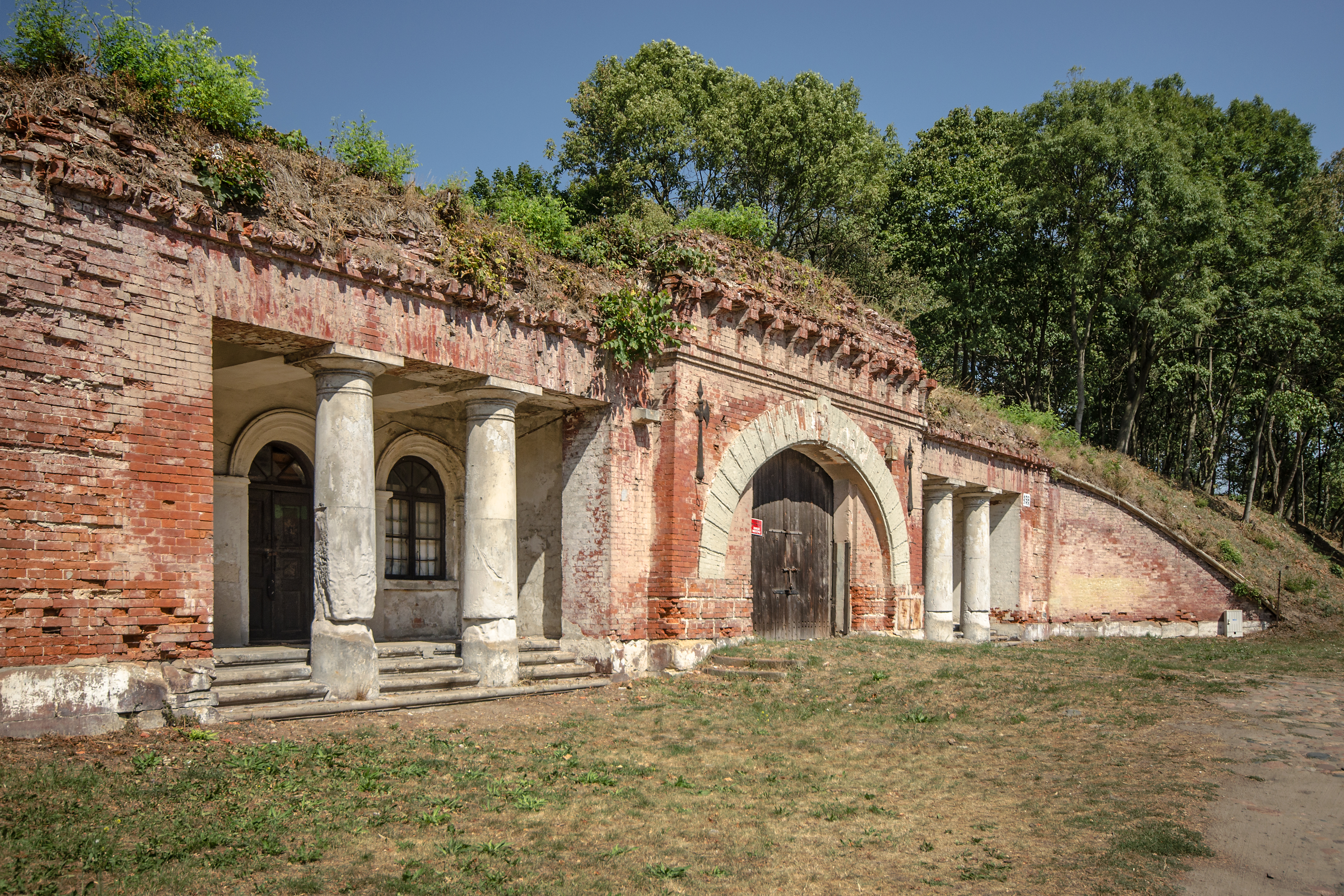
Poniatowski Gate

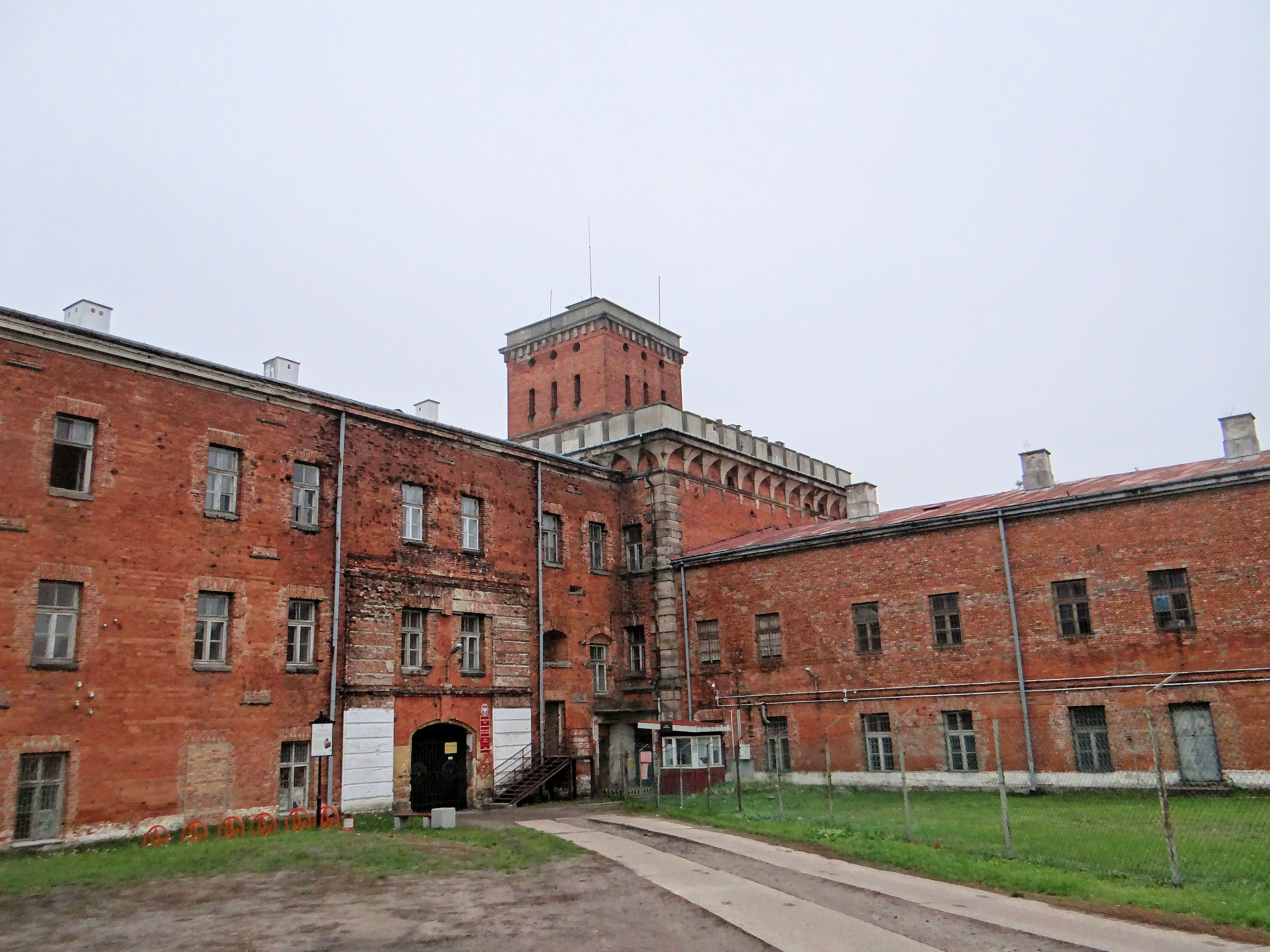
Inner Garrison of the Modlin Fortress

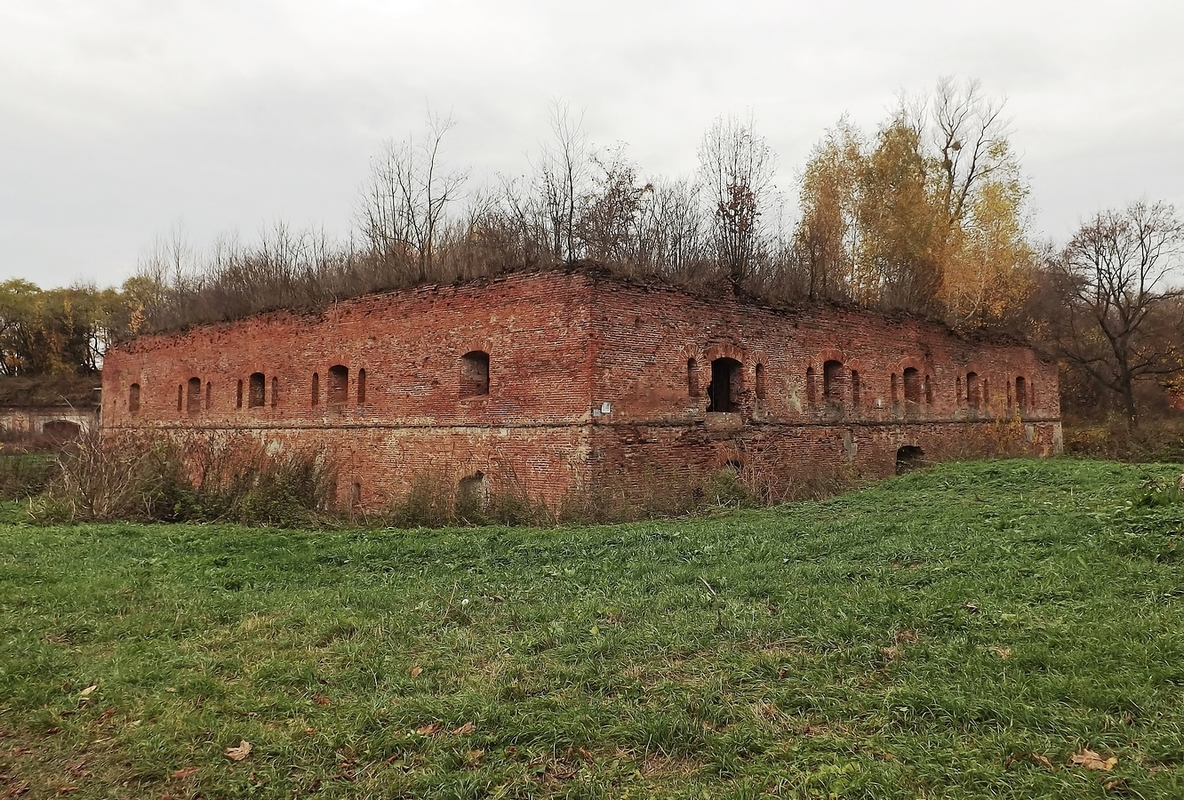
Napoleons Redoubt

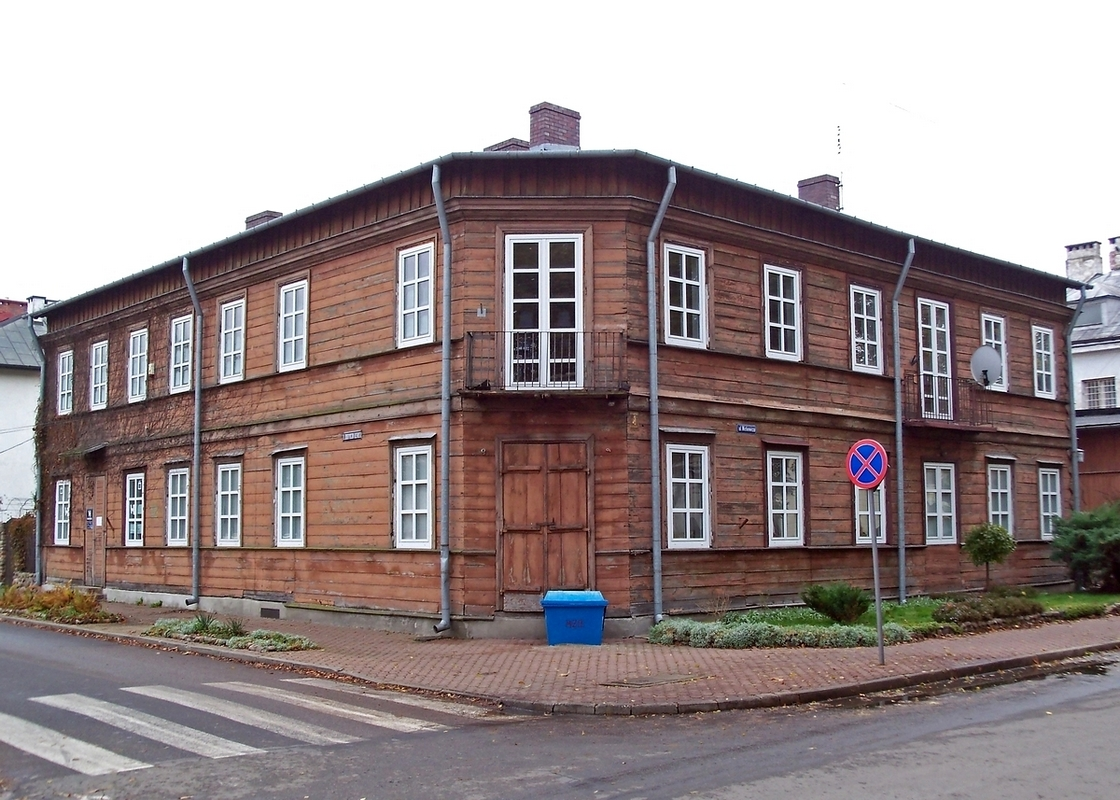
Heritage wooden architecture

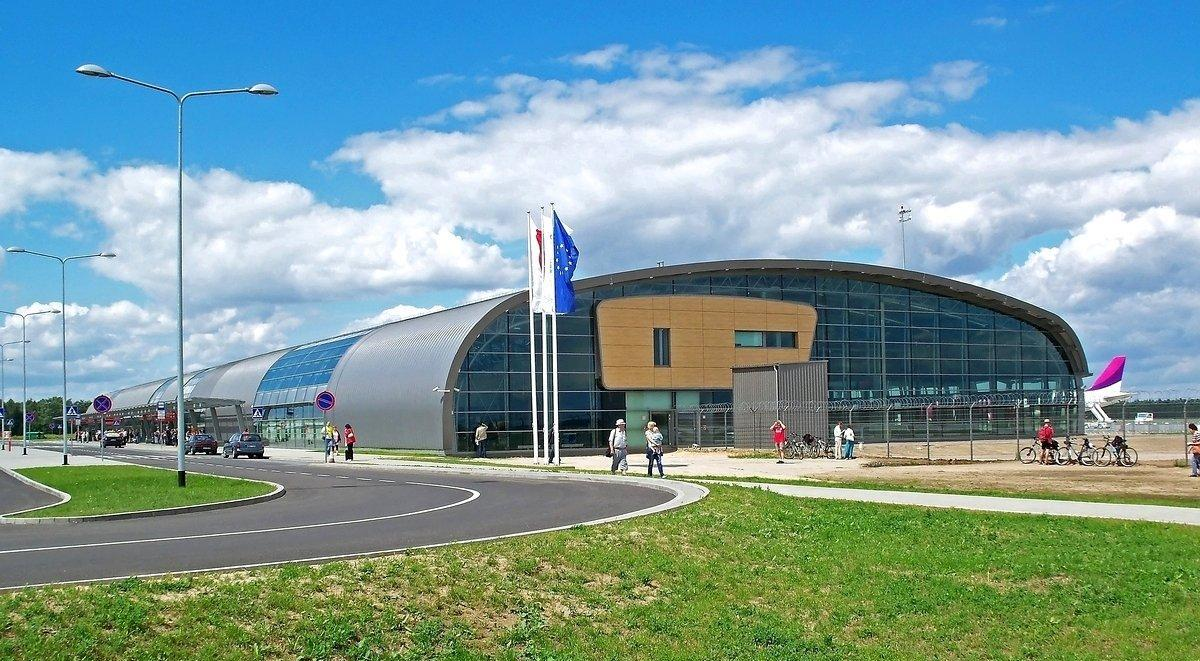
Warsaw Modlin Airport
