= Alexandru Popa (politician) =

Romanian politician (born 1990)

Member of the Chamber of Deputies
- Incumbent
- Assumed office 21 December 2020
- Constituency: Brăila

Personal details
- Born: 6 August 1990 (age 35)
- Party: National Liberal Party

Alexandru Popa (born 6 August 1990) is a Romanian politician of the National Liberal Party. Since 2020, he has been a member of the Chamber of Deputies. In 2021, he was elected leader of the National Liberal Party in Brăila County. In 2024, he was elected quaestor of the chamber.
