= Jens Fiedler (canoeist) =

German canoeist

Medal record

Men's canoe sprint

World Championships
Gold medal – first place	1986 Montreal	K-4 500m
Silver medal – second place	1986 Montreal	K-4 1000m

Jens Fiedler is an East German canoe sprinter who competed in the late 1980s. He won two medals at the 1986 ICF Canoe Sprint World Championships in Montreal with a gold in the K-4 500m and silver in the K-4 1000m events.
