= Army Ranger Battalion (Sweden) =

Coordinates: 65°34′57″N 19°09′43″E

Army Ranger Battalion 193rd Ranger Battalion
- Arméns jägarbataljon 193. jägarbataljonen
- Active: 2005–2021
- Country: Sweden
- Branch: Swedish Army
- Type: special operations and specialized arctic light infantry
- Size: Battalion
- Garrison/HQ: Arvidsjaur, Norrbotten County
- Engagements: Bosnian War; KFOR; War in Afghanistan; Northern Mali conflict Operation Inherent Resolve

193rd Ranger Battalion (Swedish: 193. jägarbataljonen), also known as the Army Ranger Battalion (Swedish: Arméns jägarbataljon, AJB) was a specialized arctic light infantry unit, based in Arvidsjaur, in the Norrbotten County of Sweden.

Units from AJB have been involved in Afghanistan, Bosnia, Kosovo, Pakistan, Ukraine, Chad, Mali and Iraq.

== History ==
The Army Ranger Battalion is an elite light infantry unit trained to carry out reconnaissance missions and direct action behind enemy lines. The battalion is the army's primary resource for combat operations behind enemy lines. They employ ambushes and control indirect fire or close air support, as well as survey and document enemy activity to create a basis for higher command's decision making.

The battalion is often used to target soft targets such as logistics and other support functions vital for an opponent's ability to sustain its operations. Given the light nature of the unit it lacks heavier vehicles and sustained logistics for support, and largely relies on its personnel to move themselves and their equipment as well as supplies over long distances by foot. Given the geographical location of the unit, they are also highly qualified and trained to operate in arctic and/or subarctic environments.

Anyone qualified for military service can apply for selection at the Army Ranger Battalion. After the general 12 week long basic training (GMU), several tests, both physical and psychological are conducted over a period of days. If the candidate is successful, he/she will begin the roughly 48 week long basic ranger course. Upon completion of the course with satisfying results the candidate will be awarded with the green beret and Ranger tab before being posted to one of the battalion's two Ranger squadrons or the command & support squadron.

Since 2007 the battalion also has a mountain leader platoon which specializes in operations in and around mountainous and alpine terrain. This platoon has been of much use in Afghanistan since many weapons, drugs and the like are smuggled high up in the mountains there. The mountain leader platoon has also been involved in search and rescue operations domestically, such as the 2012 Norwegian C-130 crash.

The Army Ranger battalion have deployed to Bosnia, Kosovo, Afghanistan and Mali.

On 14 May 2019, the Swedish Defence Commission (Försvarsberedningen) submitted its final report to the Government, proposing how military defence would develop in the years 2021–2025. The Defence Commission proposed, among other things, that Norrland Dragoon Regiment (K 4) be re-established for the training of Arctic ranger battalions. The Armed Forces carried out an analysis of the Defence Commission's final report Värnkraft, where the Armed Forces also proposed that a new organizational unit be established in Arvidsjaur. The Armed Forces proposed that Norrland Dragoon Regiment should be formed from 2022 by the detachment Army Ranger Battalion (AJB).

== Commanding officers ==
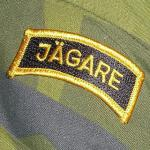
Jägare (Ranger) tab is received after completing basic ranger course.

- 2005–2007: Lieutenant Colonel Peter Fredriksson
- 2007–2009: Lieutenant Colonel Mikael Nordmark
- 2009–2013: Lieutenant Colonel Urban Edlund
- 2013–2016: Lieutenant Colonel Teddy Larsson
- 2016–2020: Lieutenant Colonel Mathias Holmqvist
- 2020–2021: Lieutenant Colonel Fredrik Andersson

== See also ==
- Finland – Utti Jaeger Regiment
