= Jens Fiedler (handballer) =

German handball player (born 1966)

Personal information
- Nationality: German
- Born: 19 October 1966 (age 58); Zwickau, Germany

Sport
- Sport: Handball

Jens Fiedler (born 19 October 1966) is a German handball player. He competed in the men's tournament at the 1988 Summer Olympics.
