= Kálmán Petrovics =

Hungarian canoeist

Personal information
- Born: 10 April 1961 (age 65) Vác, Hungary

Sport
- Sport: Canoe sprint
Medal record
Representing Hungary
Men's canoe sprint
World Championships
Gold medal – first place	1985 Mechelen	K-4 10000 m
Silver medal – second place	1987 Duisburg	K-4 10000 m
Bronze medal – third place	1982 Belgrade	K-4 10000 m
Bronze medal – third place	1986 Montreal	K-4 10000 m
Summer Universiade
Gold medal – first place	1987 Zagreb	K-4 1000 m
Bronze medal – third place	1987 Zagreb	K-2 1000 m
Men's canoe marathon
World Championships
Gold medal – first place	1990 Denmark	K-1 marathon

Kálmán Petrovics (born 10 April 1961) is a Hungarian sprint and marathon canoeist who competed in the mid to late 1980s. He won a complete set of medals in the K-4 10000 m event at the ICF Canoe Sprint World Championships with a gold in 1985, a silver in 1987, and two bronze in 1982 and 1986.
