= László Nieberl =

Hungarian canoeist

Medal record

Men's canoe sprint

World Championships
Silver medal – second place	1985 Mechelen	K-1 10000 m
Bronze medal – third place	1986 Montreal	K-4 10000 m

László Nieberl is a Hungarian sprint canoeist who competed in the mid-1980s. He won two medals at the ICF Canoe Sprint World Championships with a silver (K-1 10000 m: 1985) and a bronze (K-4 10000 m: 1986).

Later he became the first trainer of the olimpic winner Hungarian canoeist Kammerer Zoltán
