= Anna Larie =

Romanian sprint canoer

Medal record

Women's canoe sprint

World Championships
Bronze medal – third place	1986 Montreal	K-4 500 m

Anna Larie is a Romanian sprint canoer who competed in the late 1980s. She won a bronze medal in the K-4 500 m event at the 1986 ICF Canoe Sprint World Championships in Montreal.
