= Battle of Nowy Dwór Mazowiecki =

1655 battle of the Second Northern War ('Swedish Deluge')

Battle of Nowy Dwór
- Part of the Northern War of 1655–1660 / The Deluge
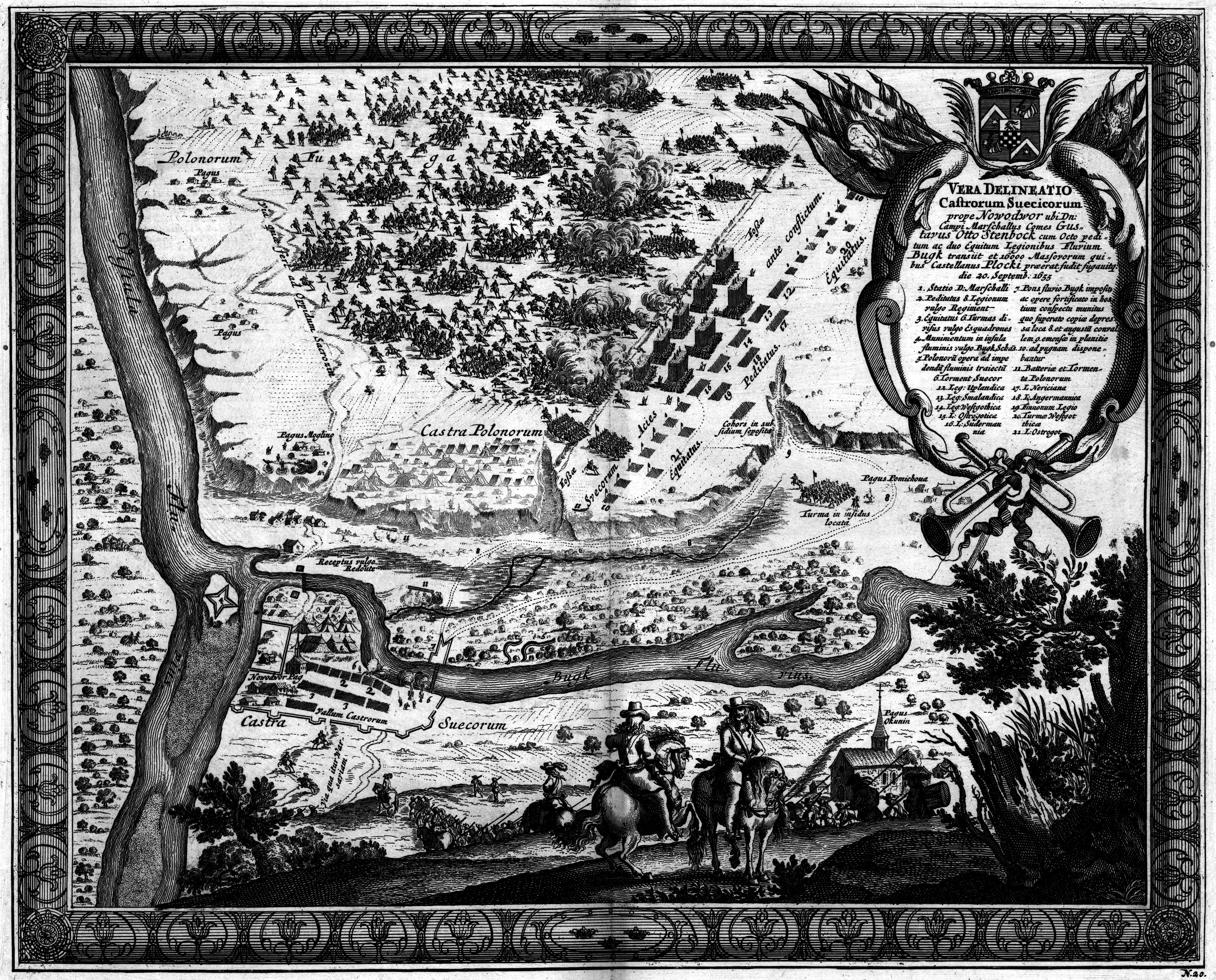
- Battle of Nowy Dwór by Erik Dahlberg
Date	20–30 September 1655
Location	Nowy Dwór Mazowiecki
Result	Swedish victory

Belligerents
Swedish Empire	Polish–Lithuanian Commonwealth

Commanders and leaders
(Swedish Empire) Gustaf Otto Stenbock	(Polish–Lithuanian Commonwealth) Jan Kazimierz Krasiński

Strength
~1,500 cavalry 6,500 infantry 60 cannons	7,000 cavalry 1,000 infantry 7 cannons

Casualties and losses
5 killed	~300 killed 7 cannons

The Battle of Nowy Dwór was fought during 20 – 30 September 1655 between forces of the Polish–Lithuanian Commonwealth commanded by Jan Kazimierz Krasiński on one side, and on the other Swedish Empire forces commanded by Gustaf Otto Stenbock. It ended in Swedish victory.

== Background ==
On 8 September 1655, Swedish forces under King Charles X Gustav entered Warsaw, which had been abandoned by John II Casimir of Poland on 18 August. At the same time, in the village of Mogilno near Zakroczym, Mazovian levée en masse gathered to fight the invaders. It was commanded by Voivode of Płock, Jan Kazimierz Krasinski. Swedish forces sent from Warsaw to face the Poles decided to cross the Narew near Nowy Dwor Mazowiecki.

== Battle ==
On 21 September, the Swedes approached Nowy Dwór. Polish camp was located on a 30-meter hill, located at the confluence of the Vistula and Bugonarew. Swedish troops quickly captured Nowy Dwor and began construction of a bridge. Their commandant, Gustaf Otto Stenbock was well aware of the fact that in previous battles, the Polish szlachta of the levée en masse had capitulated to the Swedes without fighting. Therefore, on 28 September, Stenbock urged the Poles to capitulate, but their offer was rejected. An exchange of fire began, in which Swedish artillery had an advantage. Covered by the cannons, Swedish reiters crossed the Narew, finishing construction of the bridge, and digging trenches, which protected the river crossing.

In the morning of 30 September, Stenbock's army crossed the river and attacked the Polish positions. The battle took place in the area where now the district of Modlin is located. Swedish fire forced the Masurians to withdraw north. The mobility of Polish units prevented them from complete destruction, as the Swedes were too slow to chase them. Polish losses amounted to some 300 killed. The Swedes captured about 500 wagons of the baggage train and 7 cannons which had been abandoned by the poles. Two battle standards were also taken.

On the next day the Poles counterattacked, but without success. Swedish advance continued, and the invaders captured Pułtusk.

== Aftermath ==
The Swedish victory opened the road towards the Grand Duchy of Lithuania and Livonia, while Swedish engineers noticed strategic importance of the location of the battle. In the following months, they constructed here a permanent fortified position, the so-called Bugskansen. This star-shaped military camp was main supply depot and concentration point of the Swedish-Brandenburgian army during the Battle of Warsaw. In the early 19th century, the Modlin Fortress was built in the location of the Bugskansen.

== Sources ==
- Leszek Podhorodecki, Rapier i koncerz, Warszawa 1985, ISBN 83-05-11452-X, str. 261-262
