= List of ICF Canoe Sprint World Championships medalists in women's kayak =

This is a list of medalists from the ICF Canoe Sprint World Championships in women's kayak.

== K-1 200 m ==
Debuted: 1994.

Games	Gold	Silver	Bronze
1994 Mexico City	Rita Kőbán (HUN)	Anna Olsson (SWE)	Caroline Brunet (CAN)
1995 Duisburg	Rita Kőbán (HUN)	Caroline Brunet (CAN)	Anna Olsson (SWE)
1997 Dartmouth	Caroline Brunet (CAN)	Josefa Idem (ITA)	Jacqui Mengler (AUS)
1998 Szeged	Caroline Brunet (CAN)	Josefa Idem (ITA)	Éva Dónusz (HUN)
1999 Milan	Caroline Brunet (CAN)	Josefa Idem (ITA)	Rita Kőbán (HUN)
2001 Poznań	Karen Furneaux (CAN)	Elżbieta Urbańczyk (POL)	Szilvia Szabó (HUN)
2002 Seville	Maria Teresa Portela (ESP)	Caroline Brunet (CAN)	Elżbieta Urbańczyk (POL)
2003 Gainesville	Caroline Brunet (CAN)	Maria Teresa Portela (ESP)	Tímea Paksy (HUN)
2005 Zagreb	Maria Teresa Portela (ESP)	Szilvia Szabó (HUN)	Karen Furneaux (CAN)
2006 Szeged	Tímea Paksy (HUN)	Spela Ponomarenko (SLO)	Karen Furneaux (CAN)
2007 Duisburg	Nataša Janić (HUN)	Anne Rikala (FIN)	Spela Ponomarenko (SLO)
2009 Dartmouth	Nataša Janić (HUN)	Marta Walczykiewicz (POL)	Anne Laure Viard (FRA)
2010 Poznań	Nataša Janić (HUN)	Inna Osypenko (UKR)	Shinobu Kitamoto (JPN)
2011 Szeged	Lisa Carrington (NZL)	Marta Walczykiewicz (POL)	Inna Osypenko-Radomska (UKR)
2013 Duisburg	Lisa Carrington (NZL)	Marta Walczykiewicz (POL)	Špela Ponomarenko Janić (SLO)
2014 Moscow	Lisa Carrington (NZL)	Marta Walczykiewicz (POL)	Nikolina Moldovan (SRB)
2015 Milan	Lisa Carrington (NZL)	Marta Walczykiewicz (POL)	Teresa Portela (ESP)
2017 Račice	Lisa Carrington (NZL)	Emma Jørgensen (DEN)	Špela Ponomarenko Janić (SVN); Milica Starović (SRB)
2018 Montemor-o-Velho	Lisa Carrington (NZL)	Emma Jørgensen (DEN)	Linnea Stensils (SWE)
2019 Szeged	Lisa Carrington (NZL)	Marta Walczykiewicz (POL)	Emma Jørgensen (DEN); Teresa Portela (ESP)
2021 Copenhagen	Emma Jørgensen (DEN)	Anna Lucz (HUN)	Natalia Podolskaya (RCF)
2022 Dartmouth	Lisa Carrington (NZL)	Anja Osterman (SLO)	Anna Lucz (HUN)
2023 Duisburg	Lisa Carrington (NZL)	Yale Steinepreis (AUS)	Dominika Putto (POL)
2024 Samarkand	Liudmyla Kuklinovska (UKR)	Anastasiia Dolgova (AIN)	Bolette Nyvang Iversen (DEN)
2025 Milan	Wang Nan (CHN)	Anja Osterman (SLO)	Emily Lewis (GBR)
2026 Poznán	Frederikke Mørcke (DEN)	Anna Lucz (HUN)	Sara Ouzande (ESP)

== K-1 500 m ==
Debuted: 1938. Not held: 1948. Resumed: 1950. 1938 distance was 600 m.

Games	Gold	Silver	Bronze
1938 Vaxholm	Maggie Kalka (FIN)	Maj-Britt Berqvist (SWE)	Bodil Thirstedt (DEN)
1950 Copenhagen	Sylvi Saimo (FIN)	Karen Hoff (DEN)	Fritzi Schwingl (AUT)
1954 Mâcon	Theresa Zens (SAA)	Fritzi Schwingl (AUT)	Tove Nielsen (DEN)
1958 Prague	Yelisaveta Kislova (URS)	Antonina Seredina (URS)	Theresa Zens (GER)
1963 Jajce	Mariya Zhubina (URS)	Lyudmila Chvedosyuk (URS)	Hanneliese Spitz (AUT)
1966 East Berlin	Lyudmila Pinayeva (URS)	Roswitha Esser (GER)	Anita Kobuss (GDR)
1970 Copenhagen	Lyudmila Pinayeva (URS)	Mieke Jaapies (NED)	Petra Setzkorn (GDR)
1971 Belgrade	Lyudmila Pinayeva (URS)	Mieke Jaapies (NED)	Petra Setzkorn (GDR)
1973 Tampere	Nina Gopova (URS)	Petra Borzym (GDR)	Victoria Dumitru (ROU)
1974 Mexico City	Anke Ohde (GDR)	Nina Gopova (URS)	Maria Cosma (ROU)
1975 Belgrade	Anke Ohde (GDR)	Galina Kreft (URS)	Maria Mihareanu (ROU)
1977 Sofia	Gudrun Klaus-Dittmar (GDR)	Maria Cosma (ROU)	Tatyana Korzhunova (URS)
1978 Belgrade	Roswitha Eberl (GDR)	Olga Makarova (URS)	Maria Cosma (ROU)
1979 Duisburg	Roswitha Eberl (GDR)	Galina Alekseyeva (URS)	Klára Rajnai (HUN)
1981 Nottingham	Birgit Fischer (GDR)	Éva Rakusz (HUN)	Agneta Andersson (SWE)
1982 Belgrade	Birgit Fischer (GDR)	Agneta Andersson (SWE)	Éva Rakusz (HUN)
1983 Tampere	Birgit Fischer (GDR)	Vania Gesheva (BUL)	Maria Ştefan (ROU)
1985 Mechelen	Birgit Schmidt-Fischer (GDR)	Nelliy Yefremova (URS)	Agneta Andersson (SWE)
1986 Montreal	Vania Gesheva (BUL)	Kathrin Giese (GDR)	Yvonne Knudsen (DEN)
1987 Duisburg	Birgit Schmidt-Fischer (GDR)	Izabela Dylewska (POL)	Agneta Andersson (SWE)
1989 Plovdiv	Katrin Borchert (GDR)	Izabela Dylewska (POL)	Josefa Idem (FRG)
1990 Poznań	Josefa Idem (ITA)	Yvonne Knudsen (DEN)	Katrin Borchert (GER)
1991 Paris	Katrin Borchert (GER)	Rita Kőbán (HUN)	Josefa Idem (ITA)
1993 Copenhagen	Birgit Schmidt (GER)	Anna Olsson (SWE)	Caroline Brunet (CAN)
1994 Mexico City	Birgit Schmidt (GER)	Rita Kőbán (HUN)	Josefa Idem (ITA)
1995 Duisburg	Rita Kőbán (HUN)	Caroline Brunet (CAN)	Suzanne Gunnarsson (SWE)
1997 Dartmouth	Caroline Brunet (CAN)	Josefa Idem (ITA)	Ursula Profanter (AUT)
1998 Szeged	Caroline Brunet (CAN)	Katrin Borchert (AUS)	Josefa Idem (ITA)
1999 Milan	Caroline Brunet (CAN)	Josefa Idem (ITA)	Rita Kőbán (HUN)
2001 Poznań	Josefa Idem (ITA)	Katrin Borchert (AUS)	Katalin Kovács (HUN)
2002 Seville	Katalin Kovács (HUN)	Caroline Brunet (CAN)	Josefa Idem (ITA)
2003 Gainesville	Katalin Kovács (HUN)	Caroline Brunet (CAN)	Aneta Pastuszka (POL)
2005 Zagreb	Nicole Reinhardt (GER)	Karen Furneaux (CAN)	Erzsébet Viski (HUN)
2006 Szeged	Dalma Benedek (HUN)	Josefa Idem (ITA)	Zhong Hongyan (CHN)
2007 Duisburg	Katalin Kovács (HUN)	Anne Rikala (FIN)	Katrin Wagner-Augustin (GER)
2009 Dartmouth	Katalin Kovács (HUN)	Katrin Wagner-Augustin (GER)	Josefa Idem (ITA)
2010 Poznań	Inna Osypenko (UKR)	Nataša Janić (HUN)	Rachel Cawthorn (GBR)
2011 Szeged	Nicole Reinhardt (GER)	Danuta Kozák (HUN)	Inna Osypenko-Radomska (UKR)
2013 Duisburg	Danuta Kozák (HUN)	Katrin Wagner-Augustin (GER)	Lisa Carrington (NZL)
2014 Moscow	Danuta Kozák (HUN)	Lisa Carrington (NZL)	Bridgitte Hartley (RSA)
2015 Milan	Lisa Carrington (NZL)	Anna Kárász (HUN)	Zhou Yu (CHN)
2017 Račice	Volha Khudzenka (BLR)	Lisa Carrington (NZL)	Emma Jørgensen (DEN)
2018 Montemor-o-Velho	Danuta Kozák (HUN)	Lisa Carrington (NZL)	Volha Khudzenka (BLR)
2019 Szeged	Lisa Carrington (NZL)	Volha Khudzenka (BLR)	Danuta Kozák (HUN)
2021 Copenhagen	Aimee Fisher (NZL)	Tamara Csipes (HUN)	Emma Jørgensen (DEN)
2022 Dartmouth	Lisa Carrington (NZL)	Anamaria Govorčinović (CRO)	Jule Hake (GER)
2023 Duisburg	Lisa Carrington (NZL)	Emma Jørgensen (DEN)	Tamara Csipes (HUN)
2025 Milan	Anna Puławska (POL)	Natalia Drobot (AUS)	Zsóka Csikós (HUN)
2026 Poznán	Pauline Jagsch (GER)	Aimee Fisher (NZL)	Natalia Drobot (AUS)

== K-1 1000 m ==
Debuted: 1997.

Games	Gold	Silver	Bronze
1997 Dartmouth	Caroline Brunet (CAN)	Josefa Idem (ITA)	Ursula Profanter (AUT)
1998 Szeged	Josefa Idem (ITA)	Caroline Brunet (CAN)	Katrin Borchert (AUS)
1999 Milan	Caroline Brunet (CAN)	Josefa Idem (ITA)	Katalin Kovács (HUN)
2001 Poznań	Josefa Idem (ITA)	Katrin Wagner (GER)	Katrin Borchert (AUS)
2002 Seville	Katalin Kovács (HUN)	Katrin Wagner (GER)	Josefa Idem (ITA)
2003 Gainesville	Katalin Kovács (HUN)	Katrin Wagner (GER)	Lior Karmi (ISR)
2005 Zagreb	Katrin Wagner-Augustin (GER)	Dalma Benedek (HUN)	Karen Furneaux (CAN)
2006 Szeged	Dalma Benedek (HUN)	Katrin Wagner-Augustin (GER)	Michaela Mrůzková (CZE)
2007 Duisburg	Katalin Kovács (HUN)	Friedericke Leue (GER)	Sofia Paldanius (SWE)
2009 Dartmouth	Katalin Kovács (HUN)	Franziska Weber (GER)	Bridgette Hartley (RSA)
2010 Poznań	Franziska Weber (GER)	Katalin Kovács (HUN)	Sofia Paldanius (SWE)
2011 Szeged	Tamara Csipes (HUN)	Krisztina Fazekas Zur (USA)	Naomi Flood (AUS)
2013 Duisburg	Erika Medveczky (HUN)	Verena Hantl (GER)	Edyta Dzieniszewska (POL)
2014 Moscow	Teneale Hatton (NZL)	Tamara Csipes (HUN)	Dalma Ružičić-Benedek (SRB)
2015 Milan	Erika Medveczky (HUN)	Kristina Bedeč (SRB)	Margaret Hogan (USA)
2017 Račice	Alyce Burnett (AUS)	Karin Johansson (SWE)	Rachel Cawthorn (GBR)
2018 Montemor-o-Velho	Dóra Bodonyi (HUN)	Lizzie Broughton (GBR)	Bridgitte Hartley (RSA)
2019 Szeged	Tamara Csipes (HUN)	Justyna Iskrzycka (POL)	Lizzie Broughton (GBR)
2021 Copenhagen	Alida Dóra Gazsó (HUN)	Lizzie Broughton (GBR)	Pernille Knudsen (DEN)
2022 Dartmouth	Alyssa Bull (AUS)	Lizzie Eszter Rendessy (HUN)	Anamaria Govorčinović (CRO)
2023 Duisburg	Alyssa Bull (AUS)	Justyna Iskrzycka (POL)	Eszter Rendessy (HUN)
2024 Samarkand	Emese Kőhalmi (HUN)	Maryna Litvinchuk (AIN)	Melina Andersson (SWE)
2025 Milan	Zsóka Csikós (HUN)	Alyssa Buck (AUS)	Aimee Fisher (NZL)
2026 Poznán	Zsóka Csikós (HUN)	Laia Pelachs (ESP)	Pernille Knudsen (DEN)

Zenz competed for Saar at the 1954 championships though the official reports have her listed for West Germany.

== K-1 5000 m ==
Debuted: 1989. Discontinued: 1993. Resumed: 2010.

Games	Gold	Silver	Bronze
1989 Plovdiv	Katrin Borchert (GDR)	Izabela Dylewska (POL)	Josefa Idem (FRG)
1990 Poznań	Katrin Borchert (FRG)	Josefa Idem (ITA)	Irina Salomykova (URS)
1991 Paris	Josefa Idem (ITA)	Anna Wood (AUS)	Katrin Borchert (GER)
1993 Copenhagen	Susanne Gunnarsson (SWE)	Rita Kőbán (HUN)	Birgit Schmidt (GER)
2010 Poznań	Vivien Folláth (HUN)	Maryna Paltaran (BLR)	Anne Rikala (FIN)
2011 Szeged	Tamara Csipes (HUN)	Lani Belcher (GBR)	Maryna Paltaran (BLR)
2013 Duisburg	Teneale Hatton (NZL)	Renáta Csay (HUN)	Anne Rikala (FIN)
2014 Moscow	Louisa Sawers (GBR)	Maryna Pautaran (BLR)	Renáta Csay (HUN)
2015 Milan	Maryna Litvinchuk (BLR)	Lani Belcher (GBR)	Émilie Fournel (CAN)
2017 Račice	Dóra Bodonyi (HUN)	Tabea Medert (GER)	Lani Belcher (GBR)
2018 Montemor-o-Velho	Lizzie Broughton (GBR)	Maryna Litvinchuk (BLR)	Jennifer Egan (IRL)
2019 Szeged	Dóra Bodonyi (HUN)	Tabea Medert (GER)	Maryna Litvinchuk (BLR)
2021 Copenhagen	Emese Kőhalmi (HUN)	Jennifer Egan (IRL)	Lizzie Broughton (GBR)
2022 Dartmouth	Emese Kőhalmi (HUN)	Jule Hake (GER)	Jennifer Egan (IRL)
2023 Duisburg	Estefanía Fernández (ESP)	Madeline Schmidt (CAN)	Melina Andersson (SWE)
2024 Samarkand	Emese Kőhalmi (HUN)	Maryna Litvinchuk (AIN)	Miriam Vega (ESP)
2025 Milan	Melina Andersson (SWE)	Susanna Cicali (ITA)	Anna Margrete Sletsjøe (NOR)
2026 Poznán	Melina Andersson (SWE)	Emese Kőhalmi (HUN)	Katerina Milová (CZE)

== K-2 200 m ==
Debuted: 1994.

Games	Gold	Silver	Bronze
1994 Mexico City	Rita Kőbán; Eva Laky; Hungary	Birgit Schmidt; Daniela Gleue; Germany	Barbara Hajcel; Elżbieta Urbańczyk; Poland
1995 Duisburg	Corinna Kennedy; Marie-Josée Gilbeau; Canada	Susanne Rosenqvist; Susanne Gunnarsson; Sweden	Larissa Kosorukova; Tatyana Tischenko; Russia
1997 Dartmouth	Birgit Fischer; Anett Schuck; Germany	Izabela Dylewska; Elżbieta Urbańczyk; Poland	Natalya Gouilly; Yelena Tissina; Russia
1998 Szeged	Marie-Josée Gilbeau-Ouimet; Karen Furneaux; Canada	Kinga Dékány; Rita Kőbán; Hungary	Beatriz Manchón; Izaskun Aramburu; Spain
1999 Milan	Izaskun Aramburu; Beatriz Manchón; Spain	Beata Sokołowska; Aneta Pastuszka; Poland	Rita Kőbán; Eva Laky; Hungary
2001 Poznań	Izaskun Aramburu; Sonia Molanes; Spain	Beata Sokołowska; Aneta Pastuszka; Poland	Kinga Dékány; Erzsébet Viski; Hungary
2002 Seville	Sonia Molanes; Beatriz Manchón; Spain	Aneta Pastuszka; Joanna Skowroń; Poland	Bonka Pindzeva; Delyana Dacheva; Bulgaria
2003 Gainesville	Tímea Paksy; Melinda Patyi; Hungary	Maria Teresa Portela; Beatriz Manchón; Spain	Aneta Pastuszka; Beata Sokołowska-Kulesza; Poland
2005 Zagreb	Katalin Kovács; Nataša Janić; Hungary	Maria Teresa Portela; Jana Smidakova; Spain	Birgit Fischer; Fanny Fischer; Germany
2006 Szeged	Katalin Kovács; Nataša Janić; Hungary	Katrin Wagner-Augustin; Fanny Fischer; Germany	Jenni Honkanen; Anne Rikala; Finland
2007 Duisburg	Fanny Fischer; Nicole Reinhardt; Germany	Ivana Kmeťová; Martina Kohlová; Slovakia	Marta Walczykiewicz; Dorota Kuczkowska; Poland
2009 Dartmouth	Katalin Kovács; Nataša Janić; Hungary	Fanny Fischer; Nicole Reinhardt; Germany	Ivana Kmeťová; Martina Kohlová; Slovakia
2010 Poznań	Katalin Kovács; Nataša Janić; Hungary	Marta Walczykiewicz; Ewelina Wojnarowska; Poland	Ivana Kmeťová; Martina Kohlová; Slovakia
2011 Szeged	Katalin Kovács; Danuta Kozák; Hungary	Franziska Weber; Tina Dietze; Germany	Beata Mikołajczyk; Aneta Konieczna; Poland
2013 Duisburg	Franziska Weber; Tina Dietze; Germany	Karolina Naja; Beata Mikołajczyk; Poland	Nikolina Moldovan; Olivera Moldovan; Serbia
2014 Moscow	Anna Kárász; Ninetta Vad; Hungary	Franziska Weber; Tina Dietze; Germany	Marharyta Tsishkevich; Maryna Litvinchuk; Belarus
2015 Milan	Marharyta Tsishkevich; Maryna Litvinchuk; Belarus	Luca Homonnai; Natasa Dusev-Janics; Hungary	Sabrina Hering; Steffi Kriegerstein; Germany
2017 Račice	Réka Hagymási; Ágnes Szabó; Hungary	Susanna Cicali; Francesca Genzo; Italy	Angela Hannah; Hannah Brown; United Kingdom
2018 Montemor-o-Velho	Franziska Weber; Tina Dietze; Germany	Kayla Imrie; Aimee Fisher; New Zealand	Mariia Kichasova-Skoryk; Anastasiya Horlova; Ukraine
2019 Szeged	Maryna Litvinchuk; Volha Khudzenka; Belarus	Špela Ponomarenko Janić; Anja Osterman; Slovenia	Blanka Kiss; Anna Lucz; Hungary
2021 Copenhagen	Kristina Kovnir; Anastasiia Dolgova; RCF	Blanka Kiss; Anna Lucz; Hungary	Dominika Putto; Katarzyna Kołodziejczyk; Poland
2022 Dartmouth	Blanka Kiss; Anna Lucz; Hungary	Sara Ouzande; Teresa Portela; Spain	Andréanne Langlois; Toshka Hrebacka; Canada
2023 Duisburg	Martyna Klatt; Helena Wiśniewska; Poland	Paulina Paszek; Jule Hake; Germany	Blanka Kiss; Anna Lucz; Hungary
2024 Samarkand	Svetlana Chernigovskaya; Anastasiia Dolgova; AIN	Teresa Portela; Francisca Laia; Portugal	Volha Khudzenka; Maryna Litvinchuk; AIN

== K-2 500 m ==
Debuted: 1938. This is only one of two events held at every championships. 1938 distance was 600 m.

Games	Gold	Silver	Bronze
1938 Vaxholm	Marta Pavlisová; Marie Zvolánková; Czechoslovakia	Josefa Lehmenkühler; Elisabeth Kropp; Germany	Ruth Lange; Bodil Thirstedt; Denmark
1948 London	Karen Hoff; Bodil Svendsen; Denmark	Marta Kohoutová; Růžena Košťálová; Czechoslovakia	Fritzi Schwingl; Gertrude Liebhardt; Austria
1950 Copenhagen	Sylvi Saimo; Greta Grönholm; Finland	Trude Liebhardt; Fritzi Schwingl; Austria	Ingrid Wallgren; Lisa Lundberg; Sweden
1954 Mâcon	Hilda Pinter; Klára Fried-Bánfalvi; Hungary	Valeria Lieszkowszky; Vilma Egresi; Hungary	Lisa Schwarz; Gisela Amail; West Germany
1958 Prague	Nina Grusinzheva; Mariya Zhubina; Soviet Union	Antonina Seredina; Yelisaveta Kislova; Soviet Union	Therese Zens; Ingrid Hartmann; West Germany
1963 Jajce	Roswitha Esser; Annemarie Zimmermann; West Germany	Mariya Zhubina; Lyumila Chevdosyuk; Soviet Union	Valentina Bizak; Lyubov Sinchina; Soviet Union
1966 East Berlin	Anita Kobuss; Helga Mühlberg-Ulze; East Germany	Mariya Zhubina; Antonia Seredina; Soviet Union	Katalin Benkő; Anna Pfeffer; Hungary
1970 Copenhagen	Renate Breuer; Roswitha Esser; West Germany	Lyudmila Besrukova; Tamara Zhimanskaya; Soviet Union	Petra Setzkorn; Petra Grabowski; East Germany
1971 Belgrade	Anna Pfeffer; Katalin Hollósy; Hungary	Petra Setzkorn; Petra Grabowski; East Germany	Tamara Popova; Yekaterina Kurizhko; Soviet Union
1973 Tampere	Ilse Kaschube; Petra Borzym; East Germany	Lyudmila Pinayeva; Nina Gopova; Soviet Union	Anna Pfeffer; Ilona Tőzsér; Hungary
1974 Mexico City	Bärbel Köster; Anke Ohde; East Germany	Victoria Dumitru; Maria Nichiforov; Romania	Ilona Tőzsér; Mária Zakariás; Hungary
1975 Belgrade	Bärbel Köster; Carola Zirzow; East Germany	Galina Kreft; Yekaterina Nagimaya; Soviet Union	Maria Kazanecka; Katarzyna Kulczak; Poland
1977 Sofia	Marion Rösiger; Martina Fischer; East Germany	Agafia Orlov; Nastasia Nichitov; Romania	Vania Gescheva; Diana Christova; Bulgaria
1978 Belgrade	Marion Rösiger; Martina Fischer; East Germany	Natalya Kalashinkova; Nina Doroh; Soviet Union	Agafia Orlov; Nastasia Nichitov; Romania
1979 Duisburg	Natalya Kalashinkova; Nina Doroh; Soviet Union	Marion Rösiger; Martina Bischof; East Germany	Agafia Orlov; Nastasia Nichitov; Romania
1981 Nottingham	Birgit Fischer; Carsta Kühn; East Germany	Agneta Andersson; Susanne Wiberg; Sweden	Agafia Buhaev; Maria Ştefan; Romania
1982 Belgrade	Birgit Fischer; Bettina Streussel; East Germany	Katalin Povázsán; Erika Géczi; Hungary	Karin Olsson; Agneta Andersson; Sweden
1983 Tampere	Birgit Fischer; Carsta Kühn; East Germany	Katalin Povázsán; Erika Géczi; Hungary	Agneta Andersson; Susanne Wiberg; Sweden
1985 Mechelen	Birgit Fischer; Carsta Kühn; East Germany	Éva Rakusz; Rita Kőbán; Hungary	Annemiek Derckx; Annemarie Cox; Netherlands
1986 Montreal	Katalin Povázsán; Erika Mészáros; Hungary	Nelli Korbukova; Tatyana Zhistova; Soviet Union	Vania Gesheva; Diana Paliski; Bulgaria
1987 Duisburg	Birgit Schmidt; Anke Nothnagel; East Germany	Annemiek Derckx; Annemarie Cox; Netherlands	Ogniana Petkova; Ivanka Mueriva; Bulgaria
1989 Plovdiv	Anke Nothnagel; Heike Singer; East Germany	Éva Dónusz; Erika Mészáros; Hungary	Irina Salomykova; Galina Savenko; Soviet Union
1990 Poznań	Ramona Portwich; Anke von Seck; East Germany	Éva Dónusz; Erika Mészáros; Hungary	Katrin Borchert; Monika Bunke; West Germany
1991 Paris	Ramona Portwich; Anke von Seck; Germany	Éva Dónusz; Erika Mészáros; Hungary	Agneta Andersson; Anna Olsson; Sweden
1993 Copenhagen	Agneta Andersson; Anna Olsson; Sweden	Kinga Czigány; Szilvia Mednyánszky; Hungary	Ramona Portwich; Anett Schuck; Germany
1994 Mexico City	Elżbieta Urbańczyk; Barbara Hajcel; Poland	Kinga Czigány; Szilvia Mednyánszky; Hungary	Birgit Schmidt; Daniela Gleue; Germany
1995 Duisburg	Ramona Portwich; Anett Schuck; Germany	Izabela Dylewska; Elżbieta Urbańczyk; Poland	Susanne Rosenqvist; Susanne Gunnarsson; Sweden
1997 Dartmouth	Birgit Fischer; Anett Schuck; Germany	Anna Wood; Katrin Borchert; Australia	Beatriz Manchón; Izaskun Aramburu; Spain
1998 Szeged	Anna Wood; Katrin Borchert; Australia	Birgit Fischer; Anett Schuck; Germany	Kinga Dékány; Rita Kőbán; Hungary
1999 Milan	Beata Sokołowska; Aneta Pastuszka; Poland	Caroline Brunet; Karen Furneaux; Canada	Katalin Kovács; Szilvia Szabó; Hungary
2001 Poznań	Szilvia Szabó; Kinga Bóta; Hungary	Beata Sokołowska; Aneta Pastuszka; Poland	Sonia Molanes; Beatriz Manchón; Spain
2002 Seville	Szilvia Szabó; Kinga Bóta; Hungary	Katrin Wagner; Manuela Mucke; Germany	Sonia Molanes; Beatriz Manchón; Spain
2003 Gainesville	Szilvia Szabó; Kinga Bóta; Hungary	Bonka Pindzeva; Delyana Dacheva; Bulgaria	Beata Sokołowska-Kulesza; Joanna Skowroń; Poland
2005 Zagreb	Katalin Kovács; Nataša Janić; Hungary	Petra Schlitzer; Viktoria Schwarz; Austria	Anne-Laure Viard; Marie Delattre; France
2006 Szeged	Katalin Kovács; Nataša Janić; Hungary	Jana Blahová; Michaela Mrůzková; Czech Republic	Fanny Fischer; Gesine Ruge; Germany
2007 Duisburg	Fanny Fischer; Nicole Reinhardt; Germany	Tímea Paksy; Dalma Benedek; Hungary	Anne-Laure Viard; Marie Delattre; France
2009 Dartmouth	Danuta Kozák; Gabriella Szabó; Hungary	Fanny Fischer; Nicole Reinhardt; Germany	Josefin Nordlöw; Sofia Paldanius; Sweden
2010 Poznań	Danuta Kozák; Gabriella Szabó; Hungary	Juliana Salakhova; Anastasia Sergeeva; Russia	Yvonne Schuring; Viktoria Schwarz; Austria
2011 Szeged	Yvonne Schuring; Viktoria Schwarz; Austria	Franziska Weber; Tina Dietze; Germany	Beata Mikołajczyk; Aneta Konieczna; Poland
2013 Duisburg	Franziska Weber; Tina Dietze; Germany	Katalin Kovács; Natasa Dusev-Janics; Hungary	Karolina Naja; Beata Mikołajczyk; Poland
2014 Moscow	Gabriella Szabó; Tamara Csipes; Hungary	Nikolina Moldovan; Olivera Moldovan; Serbia	Karolina Naja; Beata Mikołajczyk; Poland
2015 Milan	Gabriella Szabó; Danuta Kozák; Hungary	Milica Starović; Dalma Ružičić-Benedek; Serbia	Franziska Weber; Tina Dietze; Germany
2017 Račice	Caitlin Ryan; Lisa Carrington; New Zealand	Tina Dietze; Franziska Weber; Germany	Špela Ponomarenko Janić; Anja Ostermann; Slovenia
2018 Montemor-o-Velho	Anna Kárász; Danuta Kozák; Hungary	Caitlin Ryan; Lisa Carrington; New Zealand	Jasmin Fritz; Steffi Kriegerstein; Germany
2019 Szeged	Maryna Litvinchuk; Volha Khudzenka; Belarus	Karolina Naja; Anna Puławska; Poland	Špela Ponomarenko Janić; Anja Ostermann; Slovenia
2021 Copenhagen	Danuta Kozák; Tamara Csipes; Hungary	Volha Khudzenka; Maryna Litvinchuk; Belarus	Hermien Peters; Lize Broekx; Belgium
2022 Dartmouth	Karolina Naja; Anna Puławska; Poland	Paulina Paszek; Jule Hake; Germany	Hermien Peters; Lize Broekx; Belgium
2023 Duisburg	Emma Jørgensen; Frederikke Matthiesen; Denmark	Martyna Klatt; Helena Wiśniewska; Poland	Paulina Paszek; Jule Hake; Germany
2025 Milan	Martyna Klatt; Anna Puławska; Poland	Kailey Harlen; Natalia Drobot; Australia	Paulina Paszek; Pauline Jagsch; Germany
2026 Poznán	Kailey Harlen; Natalia Drobot; Australia	Yu Shimeng; Yin Mengdie; China	Paulina Paszek; Pauline Jagsch; Germany

== K-2 1000 m ==
Debuted: 1997. Discontinued: 2019.

Games	Gold	Silver	Bronze
1997 Dartmouth	Birgit Fischer; Marcela Bednar; Germany	Anna Wood; Katrin Borchert; Australia	Izabela Dylewska; Elżbieta Urbańczyk; Poland
1998 Szeged	Anna Wood; Katrin Borchert; Australia	Birgit Fischer; Ute Plessmann; Germany	Anna Karlsson; Susanne Gunnarsson; Sweden
1999 Milan	Anna Wood; Katrin Borchert; Australia	Manuela Mucke; Katrin Wagner; Germany	Kinga Bóta; Andrea Barosci; Hungary
2001 Poznań	Manuela Mucke; Nadine Opgen-Rhein; Germany	Katrin Borchert; Katrin Kieseler; Australia	Beatriz Manchón; Sonia Molanes; Spain
2002 Seville	Szilvia Szabó; Kinga Bóta; Hungary	Nadine Opgen-Rhein; Manuela Mucke; Germany	Adi Gafni; Larissa Pessakhovitch; Israel
2003 Gainesville	Tímea Paksy; Dalma Benedek; Hungary	Nadine Opgen-Rhein; Manuela Mucke; Germany	Caroline Brunet; Mylanie Barre; Canada
2005 Zagreb	Katalin Kovács; Nataša Janić; Hungary	Maike Nollen; Nadine Opgen-Rhein; Germany	Aneta Białkowska; Joanna Skowroń; Poland
2006 Szeged	Katalin Kovács; Nataša Janić; Hungary	Zhu Minyuan; Yang Yali; China	Ganna Pushkova-Areshka; Natalya Bondarenko; Belarus
2007 Duisburg	Gesine Ruge; Judith Hörmann; Germany	Ewelina Wojnarowska; Małgorzata Chojnacka; Poland	Danuta Kozák; Gabriella Szabó; Hungary
2009 Dartmouth	Beata Mikołajczyk; Małgorzata Chojnacka; Poland	Tina Dietze; Carolin Leonhardt; Germany	Dalma Benedek; Erika Medveczky; Hungary
2010 Poznań	Gabriella Szabó; Tamara Csipes; Hungary	Carolin Leonhardt; Silke Hörmann; Germany	Juliana Salakhova; Anastasia Sergeeva; Russia
2011 Szeged	Anne Knorr; Debora Niche; Germany	Berenike Faldum; Daniela Nedeva; Bulgaria	Alíz Sarudi; Erika Medveczky; Hungary
2013 Duisburg	Gabriella Szabó; Krisztina Fazekas Zur; Hungary	Carolin Leonhardt; Conny Waßmuth; Germany	Irina Lauric; Bianca Plesca; Romania
2014 Moscow	Henriette Engel Hansen; Emma Jørgensen; Denmark	Aleksandra Grishina; Sofiya Yurchanka; Belarus	Erika Medveczky; Alíz Sarudi; Hungary
2015 Milan	Sabrina Hering; Steffi Kriegerstein; Germany	Sofiya Yurchanka; Aleksandra Grishina; Belarus	Alaiz Sarudi; Dóra Bodonyi; Hungary
2017 Račice	Erika Medveczky; Ramóna Farkasdi; Hungary	Tabea Medert; Melanie Gebhardt; Germany	Paulina Paszek; Justyna Iskrzycka; Poland
2018 Montemor-o-Velho	Tamara Csipes; Erika Medveczky; Hungary	Paulina Paszek; Justyna Iskrzycka; Poland	Sarah Brüßler; Melanie Gebhardt; Germany
2019 Szeged	Erika Medveczky; Réka Hagymási; Hungary	Tabea Medert; Sarah Brüßler; Germany	Karina Alanís; Maricela Montemayor; Mexico

== K-2 5000 m ==
Debuted: 1989. Discontinued: 1993.

Games	Gold	Silver	Bronze
1989 Plovdiv	Monika Bunke; Ramona Portwich; East Germany	Marina Bituleanu; Lumineta Hertea; Romania	Aleksandra Apanovich; Nadezhda Kovalevich; Soviet Union
1990 Poznań	Ramona Portwich; Anett Schuck; East Germany	Éva Dónusz; Erika Mészáros; Hungary	Katarin Koniovskala; Nelly Korbukova; Soviet Union
1991 Paris	Ramona Portwich; Anett Schuck; Germany	Maria Haglund; Susanne Rosenquist; Sweden	Bernadette Bregeon; Sabine Gotschy; France
1993 Copenhagen	Ramona Portwich; Anett Schuck; Germany	Éva Dónusz; Erika Mészáros; Hungary	Carmen Simion; Sanda Toma; Romania

== K-4 200 m ==
Debuted: 1994. Discontinued: 2009.

Games	Gold	Silver	Bronze
1994 Mexico City	Éva Dónusz; Szilvia Mednyánszky; Eva Laky; Rita Kőbán; Hungary	Birgit Schmidt; Anett Schuck; Ramona Portwich; Daniela Gleue; Germany	Caroline Brunet; Klari MacAskill; Alison Herst; Corrina Kennedy; Canada
1995 Duisburg	Caroline Brunet; Alison Herst; Corrina Kennedy; Marie-Josée Gilbeau; Canada	Manuela Mucke; Ramona Portwich; Birgit Schmidt; Anett Schuck; Germany	Ingela Eriksson; Maria Haglund; Anna Olsson; Susanne Rosenquist; Sweden
1997 Dartmouth	Birgit Fischer; Anett Schuck; Manuela Mucke; Katrin Wagner; Germany	Karen Fumeaux; Corrina Kennedy; Danica Rice; Marie-Josée Gilbeau; Canada	Anna Karlsson; Ingela Eriksson; Maria Haglund; Susanne Rosenquist; Sweden
1998 Szeged	Kinga Dékány; Erzsébet Viski; Rita Kőbán; Katalin Kovács; Hungary	Anna Karlsson; Susanne Gunnarsson; Ingela Eriksson; Maria Haglund; Sweden	Natalya Gouily; Yelena Tissina; Larissa Peisakhovich; Tatyana Tichtchenko; Russia
1999 Milan	Katalin Kovács; Erzsébet Viski; Szilvia Szabó; Rita Kőbán; Hungary	Natalya Gouily; Olga Tichtchenko; Tatyana Tichtchenko; Galina Poyvayeva; Russia	Beata Sokołowska; Aneta Pastuszka; Agata Piszcz; Aneta Michalak; Poland
2001 Poznań	Kinga Dékány; Krisztina Fazekas; Erzsébet Viski; Katalin Kovács; Hungary	Maria Teresa Portela; Maria Garcia; Belen Sánchez; Ana Mariá Penas; Spain	Karolina Sadalska; Aneta Pastuszka; Dorota Kuczkowska; Joanna Skowroń; Poland
2002 Seville	Nataša Janić; Szilvia Szabó; Erzsébet Viski; Tímea Paksy; Hungary	Maria Teresa Portela; Sonia Molanes; Beatriz Manchón; Maria Garcia; Spain	Katrin Wagner; Anett Schuck; Manuela Mucke; Maike Nollen; Germany
2003 Gainesville	Katalin Kovács; Szilvia Szabó; Erzsébet Viski; Kinga Bóta; Hungary	Maria Garcia Suarez; Beatriz Manchón; Jana Smidakova; Maria Teresa Portela; Spain	Karolina Sadalska; Aneta Pastuszka; Beata Sokołowska-Kulesza; Joanna Skowroń; Poland
2005 Zagreb	Carolin Leonhardt; Nicole Reinhardt; Judith Hörmann; Katrin Wagner-Augustin; Germany	Iwona Pyzalska; Małgorzata Czajczyńska; Joanna Skowroń; Beata Sokołowska-Kulesza; Poland	Isabel García; Ana Varela; Jana Smidakova; Maria Teresa Portela; Spain
2006 Szeged	Tímea Paksy; Melinda Patyi; Nataša Janić; Katalin Kovács; Hungary	Judith Hörmann; Nicole Reinhardt; Carolin Leonhardt; Conny Waßmuth; Germany	Josefin Nordlöw; Sofia Paldanius; Karin Johansson; Anna Karlsson; Sweden
2007 Duisburg	Carolin Leonhardt; Conny Waßmuth; Katrin Wagner-Augustin; Maren Knebel; Germany	Tímea Paksy; Katalin Kovács; Krisztina Fazekas; Melinda Patyi; Hungary	Miljana Knežević; Antonija Panda; Renata Kubik; Marta Tibor; Serbia
2009 Dartmouth	Tina Dietze; Carolin Leonhardt; Katrin Wagner-Augustin; Conny Waßmuth; Germany	Krisztina Fazekas; Nataša Janić; Katalin Kovács; Tímea Paksy; Hungary	Beatriz Gomes; Helena Rodrigues; Teresa Portela; Joana Sousa; Portugal

== K-4 500 m ==
Debuted: 1963.

Games	Gold	Silver	Bronze
1963 Jajce	Valentina Bizak; Lyudmila Pinayeva; Mariya Zhubina; Antonina Seredina; Soviet Union	Roswitha Esser; Erika Felten; Ingrid Hartmann; Annemarie Zimmermann; West Germany	Marion Knobba; Anita Nüssner-Kobuss; Charlotte Seidelmann; Helga Mühilberg-Ulze; East Germany
1966 East Berlin	Mariya Zhubina; Antonina Seredina; Lyudmila Pinayeva; Nadezhda Levchenko; Soviet Union	Sigrud Kummer; Roswitha Esser; Irene Rozema; Renate Breuer; West Germany	Käthe Pohland; Karin Haftenberger; Anita Nüssner; Helga Mühilberg-Ulze; East Germany
1970 Copenhagen	Lyudmila Besrukova; Tamara Zhimanskaya; Natalya Boyko; Nineli Vaklua; Soviet Union	Petra Setzkorn; Petra Grabowski; Ingeborg Loesch; Anita Nüssner-Kobuss; East Germany	Roswitha Esser; Irene Pepinghege; Roswitha Spohr; Monika Bergmann; West Germany
1971 Belgrade	Yekaterina Kurizhko; Natalya Boyko; Yuliya Ryabtzhinskaya; Lyudmila Pinayeva; Soviet Union	Renate Breuer; Roswitha Esser; Irene Pepinghege; Heiderose Wallbaum; West Germany	Petra Setzkorn; Marion Grupe; Bettina Müller; Petra Grabowski; East Germany
1973 Tampere	Lyudmila Pinayeva; Nina Gopova; Larissa Kabakova; Tamara Popova; Soviet Union	Anna Pfeffer; Ilona Tőzsér; Erzsébet Horváth; Mária Zakariás; Hungary	Victoria Dumitru; Maria Nichiforov; Maria Cosma; Maria Ivanov; Romania
1974 Mexico City	Ilse Kaschube; Bärbel Köster; Anke Ohde; Carola Zirzow; East Germany	Nina Gopova; Larissa Kabakova; Tatyana Korzhunova; Galina Kreft; Soviet Union	Victoria Dumitru; Maria Nichiforov; Maria Cosma; Agafia Orlov; Romania
1975 Belgrade	Bärbel Köster; Anke Ohde; Bettina Müller; Carola Zirzow; East Germany	Larissa Besnitzkaya; Galina Kreft; Yekaterina Nagimaya; Nadezhda Trachimenok; Soviet Union	Ilona Tőzsér; Mária Zakariás; Klára Rajnai; Ágnes Pozsonyi; Hungary
1977 Sofia	Maria Mintscheva; Rosa Bohanova; Velitscha Mintscheva; Natascha Janakieva; Bulgaria	Marion Rösiger; Martina Fischer; Sabine Pochert; Gudrun Klaus-Dittmar; East Germany	Taisiya Laptyeva; Galina Zhikareva; Tatyana Korzhunova; Nina Doroh; Soviet Union
1978 Belgrade	Marion Rösiger; Roswitha Eberl; Carsta Genäuß; Birgit Fischer; East Germany	Vanja Gescheva; Maria Mintscheva; Natascha Janakieva; Iliana Nikolova; Bulgaria	Agafia Orlov; Natasia Nichitov; Maria Nicolae; Nastasia Buri; Romania
1979 Duisburg	Marion Rösiger; Martina Bischof; Birgit Fischer; Roswitha Eberl; East Germany	Galina Alekseyeva; Nadezhda Trachimenok; Tatyana Korzhunova; Larissa Nadviga; Soviet Union	Agafia Orlov; Natasia Nichitov; Maria Nicolae; Adriana Tarasov; Romania
1981 Nottingham	Birgit Fischer; Carsta Kühn; Kathrin Giese; Roswitha Eberl; East Germany	Natalya Filonich; Larissa Nadviga; Inna Zhipulina; Lyubov Orechova; Soviet Union	Karin Olsson; Agneta Andersson; Susanne Wiberg; Eva Karlsson; Sweden
1982 Belgrade	Birgit Fischer; Bettina Streussel; Roswitha Eberl; Kathrin Giese; East Germany	Inna Zhipulina; Nelli Yefremova; Yekaterina Golubeva; Saba Komkova; Soviet Union	Agnes Dragos; Erika Géczi; Katalin Povázsán; Éva Rakusz; Hungary
1983 Tampere	Birgit Fischer; Carsta Kühn; Ramona Walther; Kathrin Giese; East Germany	Inna Zhipulina; Nelli Yefremova; Natalya Kalashinkova; Galina Alekseyeva; Soviet Union	Tecia Borzanea; Agafia Burhaev; Natasia Ionescu; Maria Ştefan; Romania
1985 Mechelen	Birgit Fischer; Carsta Kühn; Heike Singer; Kathrin Giese; East Germany	Yelena Dudina; Nelli Yefremova; Irina Salomykova; Guinara Zharafutdinova; Soviet Union	Katalin Gyulai; Erika Géczi; Éva Rakusz; Rita Kőbán; Hungary
1986 Montreal	Erika Géczi; Erika Mészáros; Rita Kőbán; Éva Rakusz; Hungary	Nelli Korbukova; Anzhela Nadtochayeva; Tatyana Zhistova; Olga Slapina; Soviet Union	Tecia Borcanea; Luminata Munteanu; Marina Ciiucur; Anna Larie; Romania
1987 Duisburg	Birgit Schmidt; Anke Nothnagel; Ramona Portwich; Ines Rudolph; East Germany	Erika Géczi; Rita Kőbán; Katalin Povázsán; Éva Rakusz; Hungary	Irina Salomykova; Olga Slapnia; Guinara Zharafutdinova; Engole Nareviciute; Soviet Union
1989 Plovdiv	Katrin Borchert; Monika Bunke; Heike Singer; Anke Nothnagel; East Germany	Katalin Gyulai; Henriette Huber; Rita Kőbán; Erika Mészáros; Hungary	Aleksandra Apanovich; Nadezhda Kovalevich; Irina Salomykova; Galina Savenko; Soviet Union
1990 Poznań	Silke Bull; Ramona Portwich; Heike Rabenow; Anke von Seck; East Germany	Éva Dónusz; Henriette Huber; Rita Kőbán; Erika Mészáros; Hungary	Marcella Bednar; Katrin Borchert; Monika Bunke; Catrin Fischer; West Germany
1991 Paris	Katrin Borchert; Monika Bunke; Ramona Portwich; Anke von Seck; Germany	Éva Dónusz; Katalin Gyulay; Rita Kőbán; Erika Mészáros; Hungary	Liu Qinglan; Ning Menghua; Wang Jing; Wen Yanfang; China
1993 Copenhagen	Birgit Schmidt; Ramona Portwich; Anett Schuck; Daniela Gleue; Germany	Agneta Andersson; Anna Olsson; Maria Haglund; Susanne Rosenqvist; Sweden	Kinga Czigány; Éva Dónusz; Rita Kőbán; Erika Mészáros; Hungary
1994 Mexico City	Birgit Schmidt; Ramona Portwich; Anett Schuck; Daniela Gleue; Germany	Éva Dónusz; Kinga Czigány; Rita Kőbán; Szilvia Mednyánszky; Hungary	Anna Olsson; Susanne Rosenqvist; Maria Haglund; Ingela Eriksson; Sweden
1995 Duisburg	Manuela Mucke; Ramona Portwich; Birgit Schmidt; Anett Schuck; Germany	Xian Bangdi; Bei Gaobei; Ying Dong; Qin Zhang; China	Éva Dónusz; Kinga Czigány; Rita Kőbán; Szilvia Mednyánszky; Hungary
1997 Dartmouth	Birgit Fischer; Anett Schuck; Katrin Kieseler; Katrin Wagner; Germany	Kinga Dékány; Szilvia Szabó; Andrea Barocsi; Katalin Kovács; Hungary	Beatriz Manchón; Belen Sánchez; Ana María Penas; Izaskum Aramburu; Spain
1998 Szeged	Birgit Fischer; Anett Schuck; Manuela Mucke; Marcela Bednar; Germany	Kinga Dékány; Szilvia Szabó; Andrea Barocsi; Katalin Kovács; Hungary	Beatriz Manchón; Izaskum Aramburu; Ana María Penas; Belen Sánchez; Spain
1999 Milan	Katalin Kovács; Erzsébet Viski; Szilvia Szabó; Rita Kőbán; Hungary	Birgit Fischer; Anett Schuck; Manuela Mucke; Katrin Wagner; Germany	Beata Sokołowska; Aneta Pastuszka; Aneta Michalak; Joanna Skowroń; Poland
2001 Poznań	Katalin Kovács; Szilvia Szabó; Kinga Bóta; Erzsébet Viski; Hungary	Manuela Mucke; Katrin Wagner; Anett Schuck; Nadine Opgen-Rhein; Germany	Maria Garcia; Belen Sánchez; Maria Teresa Portela; Ana María Penas; Spain
2002 Seville	Katalin Kovács; Szilvia Szabó; Kinga Bóta; Erzsébet Viski; Hungary	Katrin Wagner; Anett Schuck; Manuela Mucke; Maike Nollen; Germany	Maria Teresa Portela; Sonia Molanes; Beatriz Manchón; Maria Garcia; Spain
2003 Gainesville	Katalin Kovács; Szilvia Szabó; Erzsébet Viski; Kinga Bóta; Hungary	Karolina Sadalska; Małgorzata Czajczyńska; Aneta Białkowska; Joanna Skowroń; Poland	Maria Garcia; Beatriz Manchón; Jana Smidakova; Maria Teresa Portela; Spain
2005 Zagreb	Carolin Leonhardt; Conny Waßmuth; Katrin Wagner-Augustin; Judith Hörmann; Germany	Aneta Białkowska; Aneta Konieczna; Joanna Skowroń; Iwona Pyzalska; Poland	Tímea Paksy; Dalma Benedek; Szilvia Szabó; Kinga Bóta; Hungary
2006 Szeged	Krisztina Fazekas; Tímea Paksy; Nataša Janić; Katalin Kovács; Hungary	Carolin Leonhardt; Conny Waßmuth; Katrin Wagner-Augustin; Judith Hörmann; Germany	Marianna Clobnau; Lidia Talpă; Florica Vulpeş; Alina Platon; Romania
2007 Duisburg	Carolin Leonhardt; Conny Waßmuth; Katrin Wagner-Augustin; Maren Knebel; Germany	Tímea Paksy; Katalin Kovács; Krisztina Fazekas; Dalma Benedek; Hungary	Monika Borowicz; Aneta Konieczna; Małgorzata Chojnacka; Ewelina Wojnaroska; Poland
2009 Dartmouth	Dalma Benedek; Danuta Kozák; Nataša Janić; Katalin Kovács; Hungary	Tina Dietze; Carolin Leonhardt; Katrin Wagner-Augustin; Nicole Reinhardt; Germany	Beatriz Manchón; Teresa Portela; Jana Smidakova; Sonia Molanes; Spain
2010 Poznań	Nataša Janić; Tamara Csipes; Katalin Kovács; Dalma Benedek; Hungary	Fanny Fischer; Nicole Reinhardt; Katrin Wagner-Augustin; Tina Dietze; Germany	Karolina Naja; Aneta Konieczna; Sandra Pawelczak; Magdalena Krukowska; Poland
2011 Szeged	Gabriella Szabó; Danuta Kozák; Katalin Kovács; Dalma Benedek; Hungary	Carolin Leonhardt; Silke Hörmann; Franziska Weber; Tina Dietze; Germany	Iryna Pamialova; Nadzeya Papok; Volha Khudzenka; Maryna Paltaran; Belarus
2013 Duisburg	Gabriella Szabó; Danuta Kozák; Krisztina Fazekas Zur; Ninetta Vad; Hungary	Franziska Weber; Tina Dietze; Katrin Wagner-Augustin; Verena Hantl; Germany	Marharyta Tsishkevich; Nadzeya Papok; Volha Khudzenka; Maryna Litvinchuk; Belarus
2014 Moscow	Anna Kárász; Danuta Kozák; Gabriella Szabó; Ninetta Vad; Hungary	Edyta Dzieniszewska; Beata Mikołajczyk; Karolina Naja; Marta Walczykiewicz; Poland	Volha Khudzenka; Nadzeya Papok; Maryna Pautaran; Marharyta Tsishkevich; Belarus
2015 Milan	Marharyta Tsishkevich; Nadzeya Liapeshka; Volha Khudzenka; Maryna Litvinchuk; Belarus	Gabriella Szabó; Danuta Kozák; Krisztina Fazekas Zur; Anna Kárász; Hungary	Franziska Weber; Conny Waßmuth; Verena Hantl; Tina Dietze; Germany
2017 Račice	Tamara Takács; Erika Medveczky; Krisztina Fazekas-Zur; Ninetta Vad; Hungary	Tina Dietze; Franziska Weber; Steffi Kriegerstein; Sabrina Hering; Germany	Aimee Fisher; Caitlin Ryan; Kayla Imrie; Lisa Carrington; New Zealand
2018 Montemor-o-Velho	Anna Kárász; Erika Medveczky; Danuta Kozák; Dóra Bodonyi; Hungary	Lisa Carrington; Aimee Fisher; Kayla Imrie; Caitlin Ryan; New Zealand	Karolina Naja; Helena Wisniewska; Anna Puławska; Katarzyna Kolodziejczyk; Poland
2019 Szeged	Dóra Bodonyi; Erika Medveczky; Tamara Csipes; Alida Dóra Gazsó; Hungary	Maryna Litvinchuk; Volha Khudzenka; Nadzeya Liapeshka; Marharyta Makhneva; Belarus	Karolina Naja; Anna Puławska; Katarzyna Kołodziejczyk; Helena Wiśniewska; Poland
2021 Copenhagen	Marharyta Makhneva; Nadzeya Liapeshka; Volha Khudzenka; Maryna Litvinchuk; Belarus	Danuta Kozák; Tamara Csipes; Anna Kárász; Alida Dóra Gazsó; Hungary	Svetlana Chernigovskaya; Elena Aniushina; Kira Stepanova; Anastasia Panchenko (RCF)
2022 Dartmouth	Karolina Naja; Anna Puławska; Adrianna Kąkol; Dominika Putto; Poland	Ella Beere; Alyssa Bull; Alexandra Clarke; Yale Steinepreis; Australia	Karina Alanís; Isabel Romero; Beatriz Briones; Maricela Montemayor; Mexico
2023 Duisburg	Lisa Carrington; Alicia Hoskin; Olivia Brett; Tara Vaughan; New Zealand	Karolina Naja; Anna Puławska; Adrianna Kąkol; Dominika Putto; Poland	Sara Ouzande; Estefania Fernández; Carolina García Otero; Teresa Portela; Spain
2025 Milan	Sara Ouzande; Lucía Val; Estefania Fernández; Barbara Pardo; Spain	Li Dongyin; Yu Shimeng; Wang Nan; Wang Ji; China	Marharyta Tkachova; Uladzislava Skryhanava; Ina Sauchuk; Nadzeya Kushner; AIN
2026 Poznań	Yu Shinmeng; Yin Mengdie; Wang Nan; Shen Siyu; China	Sara Ouzande; Lucía Val; Daniela García; Bárbara Pardo; Spain	Paulina Paszek; Finja Hermanussen; Pauline Jagsch; Nele Reinwardt; Germany

== K-4 1000 m ==
Debuted: 2001. Discontinued: 2007.

Games	Gold	Silver	Bronze
2001 Poznań	Kinga Dékány; Szilvia Szabó; Erzsébet Viski; Kinga Bóta; Hungary	Karolina Sadalska; Aneta Białkowska; Dorota Kuczkowska; Joanna Skowroń; Poland	Hanna Balabanova; Nataliya Feklisova; Inna Osypenko; Tetyana Semykina; Ukraine
2002 Seville	Aneta Pastuszka; Joanna Skowroń; Karolina Sadalska; Aneta Białkowska; Poland	Zhong Hongyan; Fan Lina; Gao Li; Xu Linbei; China	Tímea Paksy; Katalin Moni; Alexandra Xeresztesi; Erzsébet Viski; Hungary
2003 Gainesville	Eszter Rasztótsky; Kinga Dékány; Krisztina Fazekas; Nataša Janić; Hungary	Olena Cherevatova; Tatyana Semikina; Mariya Ralcheva; Inna Osipenko; Ukraine	Paula Harvey; Chantal Meek; Amanda Rankin; Katrin Kieseler; Australia
2005 Zagreb	Tímea Paksy; Szilvia Szabó; Erzsébet Viski; Kinga Bóta; Hungary	Florica Vulpeş; Mariana Ciobanu; Lidia Talpă; Alina Platon; Romania	Birgit Fischer; Marin Knebel; Judith Hörmann; Carolin Leonhardt; Germany
2006 Szeged	Nataša Janić; Alexandra Keresztesi; Katalin Kovács; Tímea Paksy; Hungary	Carolin Leonhardt; Miriam Frenken; Tanja Schuck; Silke Hörmann; Germany	Yu Lamei; Wang Feng; Zhang Jinmei; He Jing; China
2007 Duisburg	Tímea Paksy; Krisztina Fazekas; Alexandra Keresztesi; Dalma Benedek; Hungary	Wang Feng; Yu Lamei; Yang Yali; He Jing; China	Gesine Ruge; Friedericke Leue; Marina Schuck; Judith Hörmann; Germany

== Relay K-1 4 × 200 m ==
Debuted: 2009. Discontinued in 2014.

Games	Gold	Silver	Bronze
2009 Dartmouth	Fanny Fischer; Nicole Reinhardt; Katrin Wagner-Augustin; Conny Waßmuth; Germany	Zomilla Hegyi; Krisztina Fazekas; Nataša Janić; Tímea Paksy; Hungary	Kia Byers; Émilie Fournel; Genevieve Orton; Karen Furneaux; Canada
2010 Poznań	Nicole Reinhardt; Conny Waßmuth; Tina Dietze; Katrin Wagner-Augustin; Germany	Nataša Janić; Zomilla Hegyi; Ninetta Vad; Tímea Paksy; Hungary	Natalia Lobova; Anastasia Sergeeva; Natalia Proskurina; Anastasia Panchenko; Russia
2011 Szeged	Nicole Reinhardt; Conny Waßmuth; Tina Dietze; Carolin Leonhardt; Germany	Natalia Lobova; Anastasia Sergeeva; Natalia Proskurina; Svetlana Kudinova; Russia	Marta Walczykiewicz; Karolina Naja; Aneta Konieczna; Ewelina Wojnarowska; Poland
2013 Duisburg	Natasa Dusev-Janics; Ninetta Vad; Krisztina Fazekas Zur; Danuta Kozák; Hungary	Karolina Naja; Edyta Dzieniszewska; Ewelina Wojnarowska; Marta Walczykiewicz; Poland	Natalia Podolskaya; Elena Polyakova; Natalia Lobova; Natalia Proskurina; Russia
2014 Moscow	Edyta Dzieniszewska; Karolina Naja; Marta Walczykiewicz; Ewelina Wojnarowska; Poland	Natalia Lobova; Anastasia Panchenko; Natalia Podolskaya; Elena Terekhova; Russia	Maryna Pautaran; Volha Khudzenka; Marharyta Tsishkevich; Sofiya Yurchanka; Belarus

== Mix K-2 200 m ==
Debuted: 2021

Games	Gold	Silver	Bronze
2021 Copenhagen	Anna Lucz; Kolos Csizmadia; Hungary	Messias Baptista; Francisca Laia; Portugal	Marta Walczykiewicz; Bartosz Grabowski; Poland

== Mix K-2 500 m ==
Debuted: 2021

Games	Gold	Silver	Bronze
2022 Dartmouth	Alyssa Bull; Jackson Collins; Australia	Teresa Portela; Fernando Pimenta; Portugal	Tobias Schultz; Caroline Arft; Germany
2023 Duisburg	Lena Röhlings; Jacob Schopf; Germany	Alyssa Bull; Jackson Collins; Australia	Bárbara Pardo; Íñigo Peña; Spain
2024 Samarkand	Teresa Portela; Messias Baptista; Portugal	Volha Khudzenka; Dzmitry Natynchyk; AIN	Josef Dostál; Anežka Paloudová; Czech Republic

== Mix K-4 500 m ==
Debuted: 2024

Games	Gold	Silver	Bronze
2024 Samarkand	Nadzeya Kushner; Volha Khudzenka; Uladzislau Kravets; Dzmitry Natynchyk; AIN	Laura Ujfalvi; Emese Kőhalmi; Márk Opavszky; Gergely Balogh; Hungary	Teresa Portela; Fernando Pimenta; Messias Baptista; Francisca Laia; Portugal
