= Canoeing at the Friendship Games =

Canoeing at the Friendship Games took place in Grünau, East Berlin, East Germany between 21 and 22 July 1984. 12 events (9 men's and 3 women's) were contested.

== Medal summary ==
=== Men's events ===
Event	Gold		Silver		Bronze	
C-1 500 metres	Olaf Heukrodt (GDR)	2:07.41	Ivans Klementjevs (URS)	2:07.62	Jan Pinczura (POL)	2:09.47
C-1 1000 metres	Ivans Klementjevs (URS)	4:27.28	Jörg Schmidt (GDR)	4:29.56	Jiří Vrdlovec (TCH)	4:31.14
C-2 500 metres	Soviet Union (URS); Sergei Postrekhin; Vassiliy Beresa	1:51.09	East Germany (GDR); Ulrich Papke; Alexander Schuck	1:52.10	Hungary (HUN); János Sarusi; Gyula Hajdu	1:52.33
C-2 1000 metres	East Germany (GDR); Olaf Heukrodt; Alexander Schuck	3:56.23	Soviet Union (URS); Ivan Kovalchuk; Edem Muradosilov	3:56.92	Poland (POL); Marek Łbik; Marek Dopierała	3:58.18
K-1 500 metres	Vladimir Parfenovich (URS)	1:53.31	Andreas Stähle (GDR)	1:54.99	András Rajna (HUN)	1:58.40
K-1 1000 metres	Rüdiger Helm (GDR)	4:08.84	Witold Terechowicz (POL)	4:11.97	Felix Masár (TCH)	4:12.51
K-2 500 metres	Soviet Union (URS); Sergey Superata; Viktor Pusev	1:39.63	Poland (POL); Janusz Wegner; Witold Terechowicz	1:42.10	East Germany (GDR); Jens Fiedler; Hans-Jörg Bliesener	1:43.27
K-2 1000 metres	Soviet Union (URS); Sergey Superata; Viktor Pusev	3:35.90	East Germany (GDR); André Wohllebe; Frank Fischer	3:37.82	Cuba (CUB); Jorge L. Garcia; Reynaldo Cunill	3:37.99
K-4 1000 metres	East Germany (GDR); Jens Fiedler; Peter Hampel; Rüdiger Helm; Hans-Jörg Bliesener	3:12.69	Poland (POL); Daniel Wełna; Kazimierz Krzyżański; Janusz Wegner; Grzegorz Krawców	3:13.36	Hungary (HUN); András Rajna; Zsolt Gyulay; István Joós; Csaba Ábraham	3:14.10

=== Women's events ===
Event	Gold		Silver		Bronze	
K-1 500 metres	Birgit Fischer (GDR)	2:05.69	Rita Kőbán (HUN)	2:07.53	Galina Alexeyeva (URS)	2:09.36
K-2 500 metres	East Germany (GDR); Birgit Fischer; Carsta Kühn	1:53.55	Soviet Union (URS); Galina Alexeyeva; Yelena Dudina	1:55.37	Hungary (HUN); Rita Kőbán; Erika Géczi	1:56.52
K-4 500 metres	Soviet Union (URS); Galina Alexeyeva; Yelena Dudina; Irina Salomykova; Nelliy Yefremova	1:41.77	East Germany (GDR); Birgit Fischer; Carsta Kühn; Heike Singer; Kathrin Giese	1:43.41	Hungary (HUN); Rita Kőbán; Erika Géczi; Éva Rakusz; Katalin Povázsán	1:44.56

== Medal table ==
* Host nation (East Germany)

Rank	Nation	Gold	Silver	Bronze	Total
1	East Germany (GDR)*	6	5	1	12
2	Soviet Union (URS)	6	3	1	10
3	Poland (POL)	0	3	2	5
4	Hungary (HUN)	0	1	5	6
5	Czechoslovakia (TCH)	0	0	2	2
6	Cuba (CUB)	0	0	1	1
Totals (6 entries)		12	12	12	36

== See also ==
- Canoeing at the 1984 Summer Olympics
