= Canoeing at the 2000 Summer Olympics – Women's K-1 500 metres =

The Women's K-1 500 metres event was an individual kayaking event conducted as part of the Canoeing at the 2000 Summer Olympics program.

== Medalists ==
Gold	Silver	Bronze
Josefa Idem Guerrini (ITA)	Caroline Brunet (CAN)	Katrin Borchert (AUS)

== Results ==
=== Heats ===
17 competitors entered in two heats. The top three finishers in each heat advanced to the finals. Fourth-place through seventh-place finishers and the fastest eighth-place finisher advanced to the semi-final.

Heat 1 of 2 Date: Wednesday 27 September 2000
Place	Overall	Athlete	Nation	Time	Qual.
1	4	Caroline Brunet	Canada	1:51.558	QF
2	6	Anna Olsson	Sweden	1:52.785	QF
3	7	Elżbieta Urbańczyk	Poland	1:53.202	QF
4	9	Sanda Toma	Romania	1:54.738	QS
5	10	Manuela Mucke	Germany	1:54.870	QS
6	12	Marcela Erbanová	Slovakia	1:55.782	QS
7	13	Ursula Profanter	Austria	1:56.118	QS
8	15	Anna Hemmings	Great Britain	1:59.190	QS
9	17	Inna Osypenko	Ukraine	2:02.712	

Heat 2 of 2 Date: Wednesday 27 September 2000
Place	Overall	Athlete	Nation	Time	Qual.
1	1	Josefa Idem	Italy	1:49.889	QF
2	2	Rita Kőbán	Hungary	1:50.777	QF
3	3	Ruth Nortje	South Africa	1:51.047	QF
4	5	Katrin Borchert	Australia	1:52.187	QS
5	8	Nataša Janić	FR Yugoslavia	1:54.395	QS
6	11	Kathryn Colin	United States	1:55.373	QS
7	14	María Teresa Portela	Spain	1:59.153	QS
8	16	Sayuri Maruyama	Japan	2:00.833	QS

Overall Results Heats

Heats Overall Results
Place	Athlete	Nation	Heat	Place	Time	Qual.
1	Josefa Idem	Italy	2	1	1:49.889	QF
2	Rita Kőbán	Hungary	2	2	1:50.777	QF
3	Ruth Nortje	South Africa	2	3	1:51.047	QF
4	Caroline Brunet	Canada	1	1	1:51.558	QF
5	Katrin Borchert	Australia	2	4	1:52.187	QS
6	Anna Olsson	Sweden	2	2	1:52.785	QF
7	Elżbieta Urbańczyk	Poland	1	3	1:53.202	QF
8	Nataša Janić	FR Yugoslavia	2	5	1:54.395	QS
9	Sanda Toma	Romania	1	4	1:54.738	QS
10	Manuela Mucke	Germany	1	5	1:54.870	QS
11	Kathryn Colin	United States	2	6	1:55.373	QS
12	Marcela Erbanová	Slovakia	1	6	1:55.782	QS
13	Ursula Profanter	Austria	1	7	1:56.118	QS
14	María Teresa Portela	Spain	2	7	1:59.153	QS
15	Anna Hemmings	Great Britain	1	8	1:59.190	QS
16	Sayuri Maruyama	Japan	2	8	2:00.833	
17	Inna Osypenko	Ukraine	1	9	2:02.712	

=== Semifinal ===
The top three finishers in the semifinal advanced to the final.

Heat 1 of 1 Date: Friday 29 September 2000
Place	Athlete	Nation	Time	Qual.
1	Katrin Borchert	Australia	1:53.070	QF
2	Nataša Janić	FR Yugoslavia	1:55.482	QF
3	Ursula Profanter	Austria	1:55.626	QF
4	Manuela Mucke	Germany	1:55.794	
5	Sanda Toma	Romania	1:56.310	
6	Kathryn Colin	United States	1:57.000	
7	María Teresa Portela	Spain	1:58.932	
8	Marcela Erbanová	Slovakia	1:59.472	
9	Anna Hemmings	Great Britain	1:59.664	

=== Final ===
Final Date: Sunday 1 October 2000
Place	Athlete	Nation	Time
1st place, gold medalist(s)	Josefa Idem	Italy	2:13.848
2nd place, silver medalist(s)	Caroline Brunet	Canada	2:14.646
3rd place, bronze medalist(s)	Katrin Borchert	Australia	2:15.138
4	Nataša Janić	FR Yugoslavia	2:16.506
5	Elżbieta Urbańczyk	Poland	2:18.018
6	Rita Kőbán	Hungary	2:19.668
7	Ruth Nortje	South Africa	2:20.274
8	Ursula Profanter	Austria	2:20.598
9	Anna Olsson	Sweden	2:24.774

Brunet had won the past three world championships in this event and was undefeated in this event in over two years. High winds delayed the final by five hours. The Canadian led at the halfway mark, but was passed by Idem, competing in her fifth Summer Olympics. Idem defeated Brunet by half a boat length.
