= Laky =

Laky is a surname. Notable people with the surname include:

- Eva Laky, Hungarian sprint canoer
- László Laky (born 2000), Hungarian footballer
- Zsuzsanna Laky (born 1984), Hungarian beauty contestant

== See also ==
- Lake (surname)
- Lasky
