= Anke Ohde =

East German canoe sprinter (born 1955)

Personal information
- Born: 13 April 1955 (age 71) Malchin, East Germany

Sport
- Sport: Canoeing
Medal record
Women's canoe sprint
World Championships
Gold medal – first place	1974 Mexico City	K-1 500 m
Gold medal – first place	1974 Mexico City	K-2 500 m
Gold medal – first place	1974 Mexico City	K-4 500 m
Gold medal – first place	1975 Belgrade	K-1 500 m
Gold medal – first place	1975 Belgrade	K-4 500 m

Anke Ohde (later Wegner, born 13 April 1955 in Malchin) is an East German canoe sprinter who competed in the mid-1970s. She won five gold medals at the ICF Canoe Sprint World Championships with two in the K-1 500 m (1974, 1975), one in the K-2 500 m (1974), and two in the K-4 500 m events (1974, 1975). In 1976, she was displaced by fellow SC Neubrandenburg club member Carola Zirzow in the K-1. The Olympic nomination for the K-2 went to the world champions, Bärbel Köster and Zirzow. Ohde thus went to the 1976 Summer Olympics in Montreal as a canoeing reserve and did not compete. Ohde finished her active career after the Montreal Olympics.
