= Gao Li (disambiguation) =

Gao Li (Wade–Giles: Kao Li) may refer to:

- Kao Li or Gao Li, Chinese film director
- Gao Li (canoeist), Chinese canoeist

== See also ==
- Li Gao (351–417), founding duke of the Western Liang state
- Goryeo (918–1392), Korean kingdom
