= Thomas Gähme =

Medal record

Men's canoe sprint

World Championships
Bronze medal – third place	1987 Duisburg	K-2 1000 m

Thomas Gähme is an East German sprint canoer who competed in the late 1980s. He won a bronze medal in the K-2 1000 m event at the 1987 ICF Canoe Sprint World Championships in the inland port city of Duisburg.
