= Sergey Zhinkarenko =

Medal record

Men's canoe sprint

World Championships
Silver medal – second place	1979 Duisburg	K-4 500 m

Sergey Zhinkarenko is a Soviet sprint canoer who competed in the late 1970s. He won a silver medal in the K-4 500 m event at the 1979 ICF Canoe Sprint World Championships in Duisburg.
