= Tamás Benkő =

Hungarian canoeist

Medal record

Men's canoe sprint

World Championships
| Bronze medal – third place | 1979 Duisburg | K-4 10000 m |

Támás Benkő is a Hungarian sprint canoer who competed in the late 1970s. He won a bronze medal in the K-4 10000 m at the 1979 ICF Canoe Sprint World Championships in Duisburg.
