= Piotr Pawłowski (canoeist) =

Polish canoeist

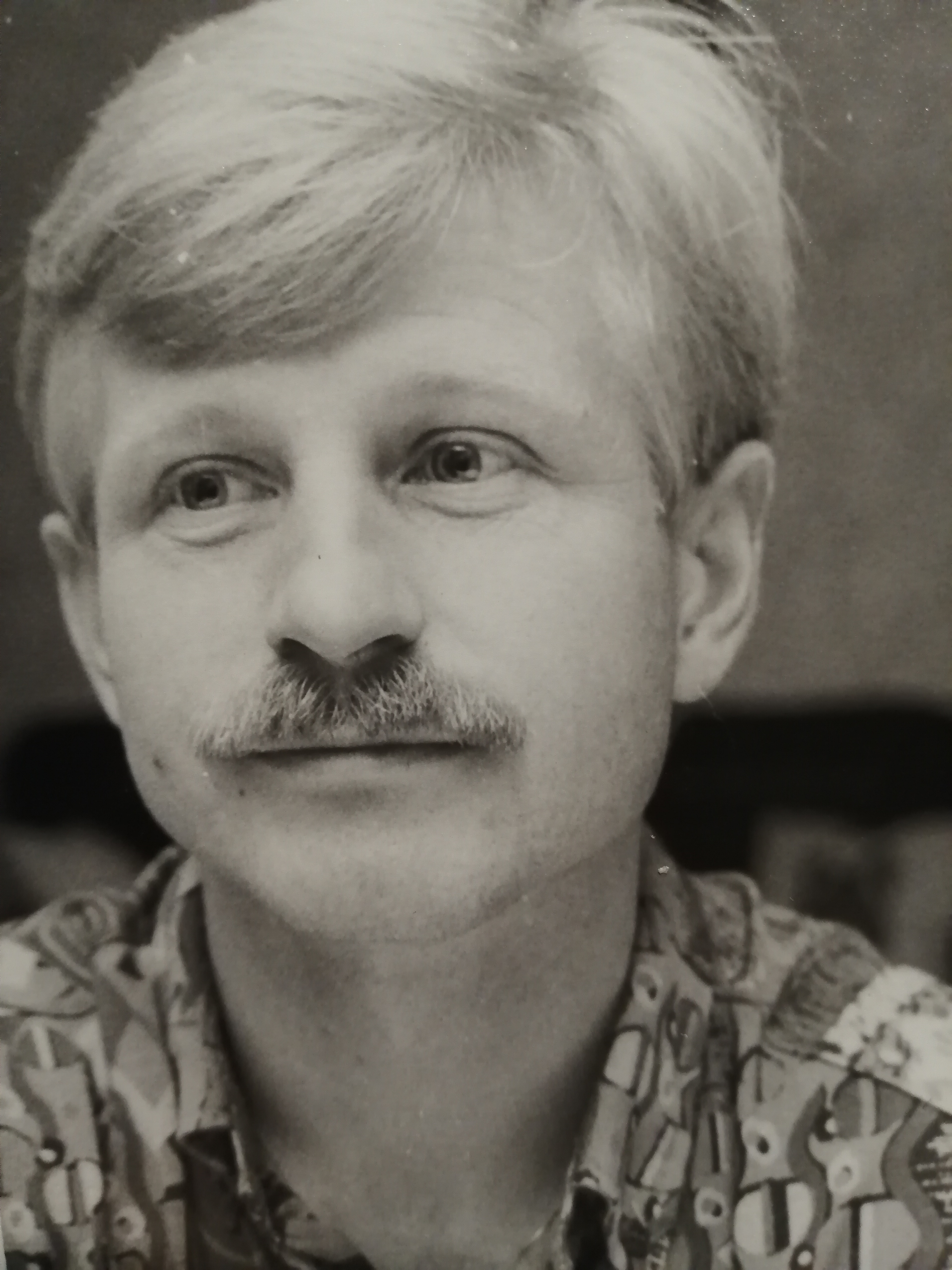

Medal record

Men's canoe sprint

World Championships
Bronze medal – third place	1979 Duisburg	C-2 500 m

Piotr Pawłowski (born 15 June 1959 in Poznań) is a Polish sprint canoer who competed in the late 1970s. He won a bronze medal in the C-2 500 m event at the 1979 ICF Canoe Sprint World Championships in Duisburg.
