= Einar Rasmussen =

Norwegian canoeist

Medal record

Men's canoe sprint

World Championships
Gold medal – first place	1975 Belgrade	K-4 10000 m
Gold medal – first place	1979 Duisburg	K-2 1000 m
Gold medal – first place	1981 Nottingham	K-1 10000 m
Gold medal – first place	1983 Tampere	K-1 10000 m
Silver medal – second place	1978 Belgrade	K-2 1000 m
Silver medal – second place	1979 Duisburg	K-1 10000 m
Silver medal – second place	1982 Belgrade	K-1 10000 m
Bronze medal – third place	1981 Nottingham	K-1 1000 m
Bronze medal – third place	1982 Belgrade	K-1 1000 m
Bronze medal – third place	1987 Duisburg	K-1 10000 m

Einar Rasmussen (born 16 July 1956) is a Norwegian sprint canoeist who competed from the mid-1970s to the late 1980s. He won ten medals at the ICF Canoe Sprint World Championships with four golds (K-1 10000 m: 1981, 1983; K-2 1000 m: 1979, K-4 10000 m: 1975), three silvers (K-1 10000 m: 1979, 1982; K-2 1000 m: 1978), and three bronzes (K-1 1000 m: 1981, 1982; K-1 10000 m: 1987).

Rasmussen also competed in three Summer Olympics, earning his best finish of sixth in the K-4 1000 m event at Montreal in 1976.

He has his education from the Norwegian School of Sport Sciences.
