= Sergei Chukhray =

Soviet canoeist (born 1955)

Medal record

Men's canoe sprint

Representing Soviet Union

Olympic Games
Gold medal – first place	1976 Montreal	K-4 1000 m
Gold medal – first place	1980 Moscow	K-2 500 m
Gold medal – first place	1980 Moscow	K-2 1000 m

World Championships
Gold medal – first place	1978 Belgrade	K-2 1000 m
Gold medal – first place	1979 Duisburg	K-2 500 m
Gold medal – first place	1982 Belgrade	K-4 10000 m
Silver medal – second place	1974 Mexico City	K-1 4 x 500 m
Silver medal – second place	1979 Duisburg	K-4 500 m
Silver medal – second place	1983 Tampere	K-4 500 m
Bronze medal – third place	1978 Belgrade	K-2 500 m
Bronze medal – third place	1979 Duisburg	K-2 1000 m
Bronze medal – third place	1983 Tampere	K-4 1000 m

Sergei Chukhray (Russian: Чухра́й Серге́й Алексе́евич, born May 31, 1955, in Belogorsk, Amur Oblast) is a Soviet sprint canoeist who competed from the mid-1970s to the early 1980s. Competing in two Summer Olympics, he won three gold medals with one in 1976 (K-4 1000 m) and two in 1980 (K-2 500 m, K-2 1000 m).

Chukhray also won nine medals at the ICF Canoe Sprint World Championships with three golds (K-2 500 m: 1979, K-2 1000 m: 1978, K-4 10000 m: 1982), three silvers (K-1 4 x 500 m: 1974, K-4 500 m: 1979, 1983), and three bronzes (K-2 500 m: 1978, K-2 1000 m: 1979, K-4 1000 m: 1983).
