= Róbert Rideg =

Hungarian sprint canoer

Medal record

Men's canoe sprint

World Championships
Silver medal – second place	1987 Duisburg	C-2 10000 m

Róbert Rideg is a Hungarian sprint canoer who competed in the late 1980s. He won a silver medal in the C-2 10000 m event at the 1987 ICF Canoe Sprint World Championships in Duisburg with Pál Pétervári.
