= 1987 ICF Canoe Sprint World Championships =

International canoe competition

The 1987 ICF Canoe Sprint World Championships were held in Duisburg, West Germany for the second time. The West German city hosted the championships previously in 1979.

The men's competition consisted of six Canadian (single paddle, open boat) and nine kayak events. Three events were held for the women, all in kayak.

This was the 21st championships in canoe sprint.

== Medal summary ==
=== Men's ===
==== Canoe ====
Event	Gold	Time	Silver	Time	Bronze	Time
C-1 500 m	Olaf Heukrodt (GDR)		Petr Procházka (TCH)		Attila Szabó (HUN)	
C-1 1000 m	Olaf Heukrodt (GDR)		Martin Marinov (BUL)		Ivan Klementiev (URS)	
C-1 10000 m	Ivan Šabjan (YUG)		Zsolt Bohács (HUN)		Takhir Kamaletdinov (URS)	
C-2 500 m	Poland; Marek Łbik; Marek Dopierała		Soviet Union; Yuriy Gurin; Valeriy Veshko		Czechoslovakia; Petr Procházka; Alon Lochinsky	
C-2 1000 m	Soviet Union; Yuriy Gurin; Valeriy Veshko		Poland; Marek Łbik; Marek Dopierała		East Germany; Ulrich Papke; Ingo Spelly	
C-2 10000 m	Denmark; Arne Nielsson; Christian Frederiksen		Hungary; Róbert Rideg; Pál Pétervári		Great Britain; Andrew Train; Stephen Train	

==== Kayak ====
Event	Gold	Time	Silver	Time	Bronze	Time
K-1 500 m	Paul MacDonald (NZL)		Andreas Stähle (GDR)		Attila Szabó (TCH)	
K-1 1000 m	Greg Barton (USA)		Ferenc Csipes (HUN)		Morten Ivarsen (NOR)	
K-1 10000 m	Greg Barton (USA)		Attila Szabó (TCH)		Einar Rasmussen (NOR)	
K-2 500 m	Hungary; Ferenc Csipes; László Fidel		New Zealand; Ian Ferguson; Paul MacDonald		Sweden; Per-Inge Bengtsson; Karl-Axel Sundqvist	
K-2 1000 m	New Zealand; Ian Ferguson; Paul MacDonald		France; Philippe Boccara; Pascal Boucherit		East Germany; Thomas Gähme; Thomas Vaske	
K-2 10000 m	France; Philippe Boccara; Pascal Boucherit		Denmark; Thor Nielsen; Lars Koch		Hungary; Ferenc Csipes; Sándor Hódosi	
K-4 500 m	Soviet Union; Aleksandr Motuzenko; Sergey Kirsanov; Artūras Vieta; Viktor Denisov		Poland; Robert Chwiałkowski; Kazimierz Krzyżański; Grzegorz Krawców; Wojciech Kurpiewski		West Germany; Reiner Scholl; Thomas Pfrang; Volker Kreutzer; Thomas Reineck	
K-4 1000 m	Hungary; Zsolt Gyulay; Ferenc Csipes; László Fidel; Zoltán Kovács		Sweden; Per-Inge Bengtsson; Lars-Erik Moberg; Karl-Axel Sundqvist; Bengt Andersson		Soviet Union; Aleksandr Matushenko; Sergey Kirsanov; Artūras Vieta; Viktor Denisov	
K-4 10000 m	Norway; Harald Amundsen; Arne Sletsjøe; Morten Ivarsen; Arne Johan Almeland		Hungary; Zoltán Berkes; Zoltán Böjti; László Nieberl; Kálmán Petrovics		West Germany; Gilber Schneider; Oliver Kegel; Carsten Lömker; Thomas Reineck	

=== Women's ===
==== Kayak ====
Event	Gold	Time	Silver	Time	Bronze	Time
K-1 500 m	Birgit Schmidt-Fischer (GDR)		Izabela Dylewska (POL)		Agneta Andersson (SWE)	
K-2 500 m	East Germany; Birgit Schmidt; Anke Nothnagel		Netherlands; Annemiek Derckx; Annemarie Cox		Bulgaria; Ogniana Petkova; Ivanka Mueriva	
K-4 500 m	East Germany; Birgit Schmidt; Anke Nothnagel; Ramona Portwich; Ines Rudolph		Hungary; Erika Géczi; Rita Kőbán; Katalin Povázsán; Éva Rakusz		Soviet Union; Irina Salomykova; Olga Slapina; Guinara Zharafutdinova; Snieguole Nareviciute	

== Medals table ==
Rank	Nation	Gold	Silver	Bronze	Total
1	East Germany (GDR)	5	1	2	8
2	Hungary (HUN)	2	5	2	9
3	Soviet Union (URS)	2	1	4	7
4	New Zealand (NZL)	2	1	0	3
5	United States (USA)	2	0	0	2
6	Poland (POL)	1	3	0	4
7	Denmark (DEN)	1	1	0	2
7	France (FRA)	1	1	0	2
9	Norway (NOR)	1	0	2	3
10	Yugoslavia (YUG)	1	0	0	1
11	Czechoslovakia (TCH)	0	2	2	4
12	Sweden (SWE)	0	1	2	3
13	Bulgaria (BUL)	0	1	1	2
14	Netherlands (NED)	0	1	0	1
15	West Germany (FRG)	0	0	2	2
16	Great Britain (GBR)	0	0	1	1
Totals (16 entries)		18	18	18	54
