= Péter Konecsny =

Hungarian sprint canoeist

Medal record

Men's canoe sprint

World Championships
Bronze medal – third place	1979 Duisburg	K-4 10000 m

Péter Konecsny is a Hungarian sprint canoer who competed in the late 1970s. He won a bronze medal in the K-4 10000 m at the 1979 ICF Canoe Sprint World Championships in Duisburg.
