= Jürgen Dittrich =

East German sprint canoer

Medal record

Men's canoe sprint

World Championships
| Gold medal – first place | 1979 Duisburg | K-4 500 m |

Jürgen Dittrich is an East German sprint canoer who competed in the late 1970s. He won a gold medal in the K-4 500 m event at the 1979 ICF Canoe Sprint World Championships in Duisburg.
