= Ionas Sautra =

Russian canoeist

Medal record

Men's canoe sprint

World Championships
Silver medal – second place	1979 Duisburg	K-4 500 m
Bronze medal – third place	1979 Duisburg	K-4 1000 m

Ionas Sautra is a Soviet sprint canoer who competed in the late 1970s. He won two medals at the 1979 ICF Canoe Sprint World Championships in Duisburg with a silver in the K-4 500 m and a bronze in the K-4 1000 m events.
