= Katrin Borchert =

German sprint canoeist

Personal information
- Born: 11 April 1969 (age 57) Waren, Mecklenburg-Vorpommern, East Germany
- Height: 178 cm (5 ft 10 in)
- Weight: 70 kg (154 lb)

Sport
- Sport: Canoe sprint
- Club: SC Neubrandenburg; Gold Coast Canoe/Kayak Club
Medal record
Women's canoe sprint
Representing East Germany
World Championships
| Gold medal – first place | 1989 Plovdiv | K-1 500 m |
| Gold medal – first place | 1989 Plovdiv | K-1 5000 m |
| Gold medal – first place | 1989 Plovdiv | K-4 500 m |
Representing West Germany
World Championships
| Gold medal – first place | 1990 Poznań | K-1 5000 m |
| Bronze medal – third place | 1990 Poznań | K-1 500 m |
| Bronze medal – third place | 1990 Poznań | K-2 500 m |
| Bronze medal – third place | 1990 Poznań | K-4 500 m |
Representing Germany
Olympic Games
| Silver medal – second place | 1992 Barcelona | K-4 500 m |
World Championships
| Gold medal – first place | 1991 Paris | K-1 500 m |
| Gold medal – first place | 1991 Paris | K-4 500 m |
| Bronze medal – third place | 1991 Paris | K-1 5000 m |
Representing Australia
Olympic Games
| Bronze medal – third place | 1996 Atlanta | K-2 500 m |
| Bronze medal – third place | 2000 Sydney | K-1 500 m |
World Championships
| Silver medal – second place | 1997 Dartmouth | K-2 500 m |
| Silver medal – second place | 1997 Dartmouth | K-2 1000 m |
| Gold medal – first place | 1998 Szeged | K-2 500 m |
| Gold medal – first place | 1998 Szeged | K-2 1000 m |
| Silver medal – second place | 1998 Szeged | K-1 500 m |
| Bronze medal – third place | 1998 Szeged | K-1 1000 m |
| Gold medal – first place | 1999 Milan | K-2 1000 m |
| Silver medal – second place | 2001 Poznań | K-1 500 m |
| Silver medal – second place | 2001 Poznań | K-2 1000 m |
| Bronze medal – third place | 2001 Poznań | K-1 1000 m |

Katrin Borchert (born 11 April 1969) is an East German-born Australian sprint canoeist who competed from the late 1980s to 2001. Competing in three Summer Olympics, she won three medals with one silver (1992: K-4 500 m for Germany) and two bronzes (both Australia, 1996: K-2 500 m, 2000: K-1 500 m). During her career, she has represented four countries: East Germany, then West Germany, then Germany followed by Australia.

Borchert was born in 1969 in Waren an der Müritz, a town in Mecklenburg-Vorpommern, East Germany. She won the Junior World Championship in 1987 but was overshadowed by Birgit Fischer. Borchert went to the 1988 Summer Olympics in Seoul, South Korea, as a reserve for East Germany but did not compete. Her opportunity arose when Fischer went on maternity leave after the Seoul Olympics; she won three gold medals at the 1989 World Championships in Plovdiv.

Borchert and her coach, Kersten Neumann, went to West Germany for the 1990 season; this was a year prior to the German reunification. From a base in Essen, she competed at the 1990 World Championships and won one gold medal and three bronze medals. In 1991, she competed for the reunited Germany and won two gold medals and a bronze medal at the World Championships.

Fischer made a return for the 1992 Summer Olympics in Barcelona, Spain, and old rivalries became hostile when Borchert lost nomination to Fischer in the K-1 and K-2, and only got nominated for the K-4. Things came to a head when the national coach, Joseph Capousek, did not nominate Borchert for the 1993 World Championships; Capousek was at the time in a relationship with Fischer. Borchert resigned from the national team in 1993 and in February 1994, she emigrated to Australia.

Borchert won K-2 500 m and K-2 1000 m events at the 1998 World Championships in Hungary with Anna Wood. They won the K-2 1000 m world champion title in 1999. Borchert would win a total of twenty medals at the ICF Canoe Sprint World Championships with nine golds for four countries (1989 for East Germany, 1990 for West Germany, 1991-93 for Germany, and 1994–2001 for Australia). At the Sydney Olympics the pairing finished sixth in the K-2 500 m, while she won bronze in the K-1 500 m event.

In March 2003, Borchert decided to return to Germany to win nomination for the 2004 German Olympic team. She was prevented from competing for Germany at the 2003 World Championships through the Australian Canoe Federation not granting their permission quickly enough.

In 2009 Borchert was inducted into the Queensland Sport Hall of Fame.
