= Alíz Sarudi =

Personal information
- Nationality: Hungarian
- Born: 12 February 1988 (age 38) Szolnok, Hungary

Sport
- Sport: Canoe sprint, dragonboat
- Club: MTK
- Coached by: Katalin Rozsnyói
Medal record
World Championships
Bronze medal – third place	2011 Szeged	K-2 1000 m
Bronze medal – third place	2014 Moscow	K-2 1000 m
Bronze medal – third place	2015 Milan	K-2 1000 m
European Championships
Gold medal – first place	2014 Brandenburg	K-2 1000 m

Alíz Sarudi (born 12 February 1988) is a Hungarian sprint canoer and dragonboat racer.

Sarudi won the bronze medal at the 2011 ICF Canoe Sprint World Championships in the K-2 1000m event with her partner Erika Medveczky.
