= Daniel Wełna =

Polish sprint canoer (born 1955)

Medal record

Men's canoe sprint

World Championships
Gold medal – first place	1977 Sofia	K-4 500 m
Gold medal – first place	1977 Sofia	K-4 1000 m
Silver medal – second place	1979 Duisburg	K-4 1000 m
Silver medal – second place	1981 Nottingham	K-2 500 m
Bronze medal – third place	1978 Belgrade	K-4 500 m
Bronze medal – third place	1979 Duisburg	K-4 500 m
Bronze medal – third place	1981 Nottingham	K-2 1000 m

Daniel Zygmunt Wełna (born 3 December 1955 in Bydgoszcz) is a Polish canoe sprinter who competed in the late 1970s and early 1980s. He won seven medals at the ICF Canoe Sprint World Championships with two golds (K-4 500 m and K-4 1000 m: both 1977), two silvers (K-2 500 m: 1981, K-4 1000 m: 1979), and three bronzes (K-2 1000 m: 1981, K-4 500 m: 1978, 1979).

Wełna also competed in two Summer Olympics, earning his best finish of fourth in the K-4 1000 m event at Moscow in 1980.
