= Nina Doroh =

Soviet canoeist

Medal record

Women's canoe sprint

World Championships
Gold medal – first place	1979 Duisburg	K-2 500 m
Silver medal – second place	1978 Belgrade	K-2 500 m
Bronze medal – third place	1977 Sofia	K-4 500 m

Nina Doroh (born 25 July 1956) is a Soviet sprint canoer who competed in the late 1970s, born in Gomel Region. She won a complete set of medals at the ICF Canoe Sprint World Championships with a gold (K-2 500 m: 1979), a silver K-2 500 m: 1978), and a bronze (K-4 500 m: 1977).
