= Natalia Proskurina =

Russian canoeist

Medal record

Women's canoe sprint

World Championships
Silver medal – second place	2011 Szeged	K-1 4 x 200 m
Bronze medal – third place	2010 Poznań	K-1 4 x 200 m
Bronze medal – third place	2013 Duisburg	K–1 4 x 200 m

U23 World Championships
Silver medal – second place	2013 Niagara	K-4 500 m

Natalia Proskurina is a Russian sprint canoer who has competed since the late 2000s. At the 2010 ICF Canoe Sprint World Championships in Poznań, she won a bronze medal in the K-1 4 x 200 m event.
