= Izabela Dylewska =

Polish canoeist (born 1968)

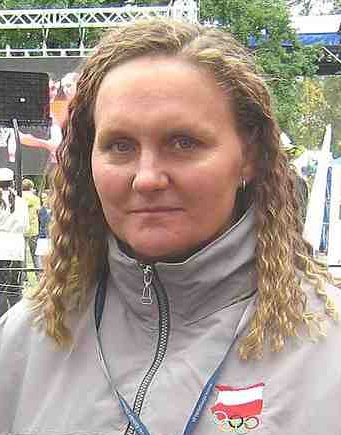

Personal information
- Born: March 16, 1968 (age 58) Nowy Dwór Mazowiecki, Poland

Sport
- Sport: Canoe sprint
Medal record
Representing Poland
Event	1st	2nd	3rd
Olympic Games	0	0	2
World Championships	0	5	1
European Championships	2	0	0
Total	2	5	3
Olympic Games
Bronze medal – third place	1988 Seoul	K-1 500 m
Bronze medal – third place	1992 Barcelona	K-1 500 m
World Championships
Silver medal – second place	1987 Duisburg	K-1 500 m
Silver medal – second place	1989 Plovdiv	K-1 500 m
Silver medal – second place	1989 Plovdiv	K-1 5000 m
Silver medal – second place	1995 Duisburg	K-2 500 m
Silver medal – second place	1997 Dartmouth	K-2 200 m
Bronze medal – third place	1997 Dartmouth	K-2 1000 m
European Championships
Gold medal – first place	1997 Plovdiv	K-2 500 m
Gold medal – first place	1997 Plovdiv	K-2 1000 m
Summer Universiade
Gold medal – first place	1987 Zagreb	K-1 500 m
Bronze medal – third place	1987 Zagreb	K-4 500 m

Izabela Dylewska-Światowiak (born March 16, 1968) is a Polish sprint canoer who competed from 1987 to 1997. Competing in three Summer Olympics, she won two bronze medals in the K-1 500 m event, earning them in 1988 and 1992.

Dylewska's first success on the international kayaking scene occurred at the 1987 World Championships when she won a silver medal in the women's K-1 500 m event, which would prove to be her best event over the ensuing years. Dylewska won a second world championships' silver medal in the K-1 500 m in 1989.

In 1995, Dylewska partnered with Elżbieta Urbańczyk to win the silver medal at the 1995 World Championships in the women's K-2 500 m. Dylewska's partnership with Urbańczyk would result in two gold medals at the 1997 European Championships (K-2 200 m and K-2 1000 m), as well as a silver medal (K-2 200 m) and bronze medal (K-2 1000 m) at the 1997 World Championships.
