= Kazimierz Krzyżański =

Polish canoeist

Medal record

Men's canoe sprint

World Championships
Silver medal – second place	1987 Duisburg	K-4 500 m
Bronze medal – third place	1986 Montreal	K-4 1000 m

Kazimierz Krzyżański (born March 3, 1960) is a Polish sprint canoer who competed in the late 1980s. He won two medals at the ICF Canoe Sprint World Championships with a silver (K-4 500 m: 1987) and a bronze (K-4 1000 m: 1986).

Krzyżański also finished fifth in the K-4 1000 m event at the 1988 Summer Olympics in Seoul.
