= Katalin Gyulai =

Hungarian canoeist

Medal record

Women's canoe sprint

World Championships
Silver medal – second place	1989 Plovdiv	K-4 500 m
Silver medal – second place	1991 Paris	K-4 500 m
Bronze medal – third place	1985 Mechelen	K-4 500 m

Katalin Gyulai is a Hungarian sprint canoer who competed from the mid-1980s to the early 1990s. She won three medals in the K-4 500 m event at the ICF Canoe Sprint World Championships with two silvers (1989, 1991) and a bronze (1985).
