= Nadezhda Trachimenok =

Soviet canoeist

Medal record

Women's canoe sprint

World Championships
Silver medal – second place	1975 Belgrade	K-4 500 m
Silver medal – second place	1979 Duisburg	K-4 500 m

Nadezhda Trachimenok is a Soviet sprint canoer who competed in the mid-1970s. She won two silver medals in the K-4 500 m event at the ICF Canoe Sprint World Championships, earning them in 1975 and 1979.
