= Henriette Huber =

Hungarian canoeist

Medal record

Women's canoe sprint

World Championships
Silver medal – second place	1989 Plovdiv	K-4 500 m
Silver medal – second place	1990 Poznań	K-4 500 m

Henriette Huber is a Hungarian sprint canoer who competed in the late 1980s and early 1990s. She won two silver medals in the K-4 500 m event at the ICF Canoe Sprint World Championships, earning them in 1989 and 1990.
