= Guinara Zharafutdinova =

Medal record

Women's canoe sprint

World Championships
Silver medal – second place	1985 Mechelen	K-4 500 m
Bronze medal – third place	1987 Duisburg	K-4 500 m

Guinara Zharafutdinova is a Soviet sprint canoer who competed in the mid to late 1980s. She won two medals in the K-4 500 m event at the ICF Canoe Sprint World Championships with a silver in 1985 and a bronze in 1987.
