= Anke von Seck =

East German canoeist (born 1966)

Medal record

Women's canoe sprint

Olympic Games
Gold medal – first place	1988 Seoul	K-2 500 m
Gold medal – first place	1988 Seoul	K-4 500 m
Gold medal – first place	1992 Barcelona	K-2 500 m
Silver medal – second place	1992 Barcelona	K-4 500 m

World Championships
Gold medal – first place	1987 Duisburg	K-2 500 m
Gold medal – first place	1987 Duisburg	K-4 500 m
Gold medal – first place	1989 Plovdiv	K-2 500 m
Gold medal – first place	1989 Plovdiv	K-4 500 m
Gold medal – first place	1990 Poznań	K-2 500 m
Gold medal – first place	1990 Poznań	K-4 500 m
Gold medal – first place	1991 Paris	K-2 500 m
Gold medal – first place	1991 Paris	K-4 500 m

Anke von Seck (née Nothnagel; Born 10 September 1966 in Brandenburg an der Havel) is an East German-German canoe sprinter who competed in the late 1980s and early 1990s. Competing in two Summer Olympics, she won four medals with three golds (1988: K-2 500 m, K-4 500 m; 1992: K-2 500 m) and one silver (1992: K-4 500 m).

Nothangel also won eight gold medals at the ICF Canoe Sprint World Championships with four in the K-2 500 m (1987, 1989, 1990, 1991) and four in the K-4 500 m (1987, 1989, 1990, 1991) events.

Nothnagel married between 1989 and 1990 seasons and from 1990, she competed under her married name.
