= Snieguolė Narevičiūtė =

Medal record

Women's canoe sprint

World Championships
Bronze medal – third place	1987 Duisburg	K-4 500 m

Snieguolė Narevičiūtė-Šeršen (born 26 October 1967) is a Soviet (Lithuanian) sprint canoer who competed in the late 1980s. She won a bronze medal in the K-4 500 m event at the 1987 ICF Canoe Sprint World Championships in Duisburg.
