= Caroline Brunet =

Canadian sprint kayaker

Medal record

Women's canoe sprint

Representing Canada

Olympic Games
Silver medal – second place	1996 Atlanta	K-1 500 m
Silver medal – second place	2000 Sydney	K-1 500 m
Bronze medal – third place	2004 Athens	K-1 500 m

World Championships
Gold medal – first place	1995 Duisburg	K-4 200 m
Gold medal – first place	1997 Dartmouth	K-1 200 m
Gold medal – first place	1997 Dartmouth	K-1 500 m
Gold medal – first place	1997 Dartmouth	K-1 1000 m
Gold medal – first place	1998 Szeged	K-1 200 m
Gold medal – first place	1998 Szeged	K-1 500 m
Gold medal – first place	1999 Milan	K-1 200 m
Gold medal – first place	1999 Milan	K-1 500 m
Gold medal – first place	1999 Milan	K-1 1000 m
Gold medal – first place	2003 Gainesville	K-1 200 m
Silver medal – second place	1995 Duisburg	K-1 200 m
Silver medal – second place	1995 Duisburg	K-1 500 m
Silver medal – second place	1998 Szeged	K-1 1000 m
Silver medal – second place	1999 Milan	K-2 500 m
Silver medal – second place	2002 Seville	K-1 200 m
Silver medal – second place	2002 Seville	K-1 500 m
Silver medal – second place	2003 Gainesville	K-1 500 m
Bronze medal – third place	1993 Copenhagen	K-1 500 m
Bronze medal – third place	1994 Mexico City	K-1 200 m
Bronze medal – third place	1994 Mexico City	K-4 200 m
Bronze medal – third place	2003 Gainesville	K-2 1000 m

Caroline Brunet (born March 20, 1969, in Quebec City, Quebec) is a Canadian sprint kayaker who competed from the late 1980s to 2004. Competing in five Summer Olympics, she won three medals in the K-1 500 m event with two silvers (1996, 2000) and one bronze (2004).

Brunet also has won 21 medals at the ICF Canoe Sprint World Championships with ten golds (K-1 200 m: 1997, 1998, 1999, 2003; K-1 500 m: 1997, 1998, 1999; K-1 1000 m: 1997, 1999; K-4 200 m: 1995), seven silvers (K-1 200 m: 1995, 2002; K-1 500 m: 1995, 2002, 2003; K-1 1000 m: 1998, K-2 500 m: 1999), and four bronzes (K-1 200 m: 1994, K-1 500 m: 1993, K-2 1000 m: 2003, K-4 200 m: 1994).
