= Klára Rajnai =

Hungarian canoeist (born 1953)

Medal record

Women's canoe sprint

Olympic Games
Silver medal – second place	1976 Montreal	K-2 500 m
Bronze medal – third place	1976 Montreal	K-1 500 m

World Championships
Bronze medal – third place	1975 Belgrade	K-4 500 m
Bronze medal – third place	1979 Duisburg	K-1 500 m

Klára Rajnai (born November 21, 1953) is a Hungarian sprint canoer who competed in the mid to late 1970s. She won two medals at the 1976 Summer Olympics in Montreal with a silver in the K-2 500 m and a bronze in the K-1 500 m events.

Rajnai also won two bronze medals at the ICF Canoe Sprint World Championships with one in the K-1 500 m (1979) and one in the K-4 500 m (1975) event.
