= Maria Cosma =

Romanian sprint canoer

Medal record

Women's canoe sprint

World Championships
Silver medal – second place	1977 Sofia	K-1 500 m
Bronze medal – third place	1973 Tampere	K-4 500 m
Bronze medal – third place	1974 Mexico City	K-1 500 m
Bronze medal – third place	1974 Mexico City	K-4 500 m
Bronze medal – third place	1978 Belgrade	K-1 500 m

Maria Cosma is a Romanian sprint canoer who competed in the mid to late 1970s. She won five medals at the ICF Canoe Sprint World Championships with a silver (K-1 500 m: 1977) and four bronzes (K-1 500 m: 1974, 1978; K-4 500 m: 1973, 1974).
