= 2019 ICF Canoe Sprint World Championships – Women's K-2 1000 metres =

Women's K-2 1000 metres at the 2019 ICF Canoe Sprint World Championships
- Venue: Olympic Centre of Szeged
- Location: Szeged, Hungary
- Dates: 23 August
- Competitors: 14 from 7 nations
- Winning time: 3:34.23

Medalists
gold medal	Erika Medveczky; Réka Hagymási	Hungary
silver medal	Tabea Medert; Sarah Brüßler	Germany
bronze medal	Karina Alanís; Maricela Montemayor	Mexico

The women's K-2 1000 metres competition at the 2019 ICF Canoe Sprint World Championships in Szeged took place at the Olympic Centre of Szeged.

== Schedule ==
The schedule was as follows:

Date	Time	Round
Friday 23 August 2019	15:53	Final

All times are Central European Summer Time (UTC+2)

== Results ==
With fewer than ten competitors entered, this event was held as a direct final.

Rank	Kayakers	Country	Time
1st place, gold medalist(s)	Erika Medveczky; Réka Hagymási	Hungary	3:34.23
2nd place, silver medalist(s)	Tabea Medert; Sarah Brüßler	Germany	3:35.59
3rd place, bronze medalist(s)	Karina Alanís; Maricela Montemayor	Mexico	3:40.91
4	Alena Kostromitina; Daria Lukina	Russia	3:45.15
5	Camila Morison; Bàrbara Pardo	Spain	3:45.79
6	Aleksandra Grishina; Daniela Nedeva	Bulgaria	3:46.41
7	Tsai An-chi; Chen Hsin-shuang	Chinese Taipei	4:08.66
