= Olga Slapina =

Soviet canoeist

Medal record

Women's canoe sprint

World Championships
Silver medal – second place	1986 Montreal	K-4 500 m
Bronze medal – third place	1987 Duisburg	K-4 500 m

Olga Slapina is a Soviet sprint canoer who competed in the late 1980s. She won two medals in the K-4 500 m event at the ICF Canoe Sprint World Championships with a silver in 1986 and a bronze in 1987.
