= Marcela Bednar =

German canoeist

Medal record

Women's canoe sprint

World Championships
Gold medal – first place	1997 Dartmouth	K-2 1000 m
Gold medal – first place	1998 Szeged	K-4 500 m
Bronze medal – third place	1990 Poznań	K-4 500 m

Marcela Bednar is a German former sprint canoer who competed in the 1990s. She won three medals at the ICF Canoe Sprint World Championships with two golds (K-4 500 m: 1997, K-4 500 m: 1998, both for Germany) and a bronze (K-4 500 m: 1990 for West Germany).
