= Agafia Constantin =

Romanian canoe racer

Medal record

Women's canoe sprint

Representing Romania

Olympic Games
Gold medal – first place	1984 Los Angeles	K-4 500 m

World Championships
Silver medal – second place	1977 Sofia	K-2 500 m
Bronze medal – third place	1974 Mexico City	K-4 500 m
Bronze medal – third place	1978 Belgrade	K-2 500 m
Bronze medal – third place	1978 Belgrade	K-4 500 m
Bronze medal – third place	1979 Duisburg	K-2 500 m
Bronze medal – third place	1979 Duisburg	K-4 500 m
Bronze medal – third place	1981 Nottingham	K-2 500 m
Bronze medal – third place	1983 Tampere	K-4 500 m

Agafia Orlov-Buhaev-Constantin (born April 19, 1955) is a Romanian sprint canoer who competed from the mid-1970s to the early 1980s. Competing in three Summer Olympics, she won a gold medal in the K-4 500 m event at Los Angeles in 1984.

Constantin also won eight medals at the ICF Canoe Sprint World Championships with a silver (K-2 500 m: 1977) and seven bronzes (K-2 500 m: 1978, 1979, 1981; K-4 500 m: 1974, 1978, 1979, 1983).
