= Tatiana Korshunova =

Soviet canoeist

Medal record

Women's canoe sprint

Olympic Games
Silver medal – second place	1976 Montreal	K-1 500 m

World Championships
Silver medal – second place	1974 Mexico City	K-4 500 m
Silver medal – second place	1979 Duisburg	K-4 500 m
Bronze medal – third place	1977 Sofia	K-1 500 m
Bronze medal – third place	1977 Sofia	K-4 500 m

Tatiana Korshunova (born March 6, 1956, in Ramenskoye, Moscow Oblast) is a Soviet sprint canoer who competed in the mid to late 1970s. She won a silver medal in the K-1 500 m event at the 1976 Summer Olympics in Montreal.

Korshunova also won four medals at the ICF Canoe Sprint World Championships with two silvers (K-4 500 m: 1974, 1979) and two bronzes (K-1 500 m and K-4 500 m: both 1977).
