= Larisa Kabakova =

Russian canoeist (born 1953)

Medal record

Women's canoe sprint

World Championships
Gold medal – first place	1973 Tampere	K-4 500 m
Silver medal – second place	1974 Mexico City	K-4 500 m

Larissa Kabakova (born 1953) is a Soviet sprint canoer who competed in the early 1970s. She won two medals in the K-4 500 m event at the ICF Canoe Sprint World Championships with a gold in 1973 and a silver in 1974.
