= Larissa Nadviga =

Soviet sprint canoer

Medal record

Women's canoe sprint

World Championships
Silver medal – second place	1979 Duisburg	K-4 500 m
Silver medal – second place	1981 Nottingham	K-4 500 m

Larissa Nadviga is a Soviet sprint canoer who competed in the late 1970s and the early 1980s. She won two silver medals in the K-4 500 m event at the ICF Canoe Sprint World Championships, earning them in 1979 and 1981.
