= Marcela Erbanová =

Slovak canoeist

Marcela Erbanová (born 20 May 1978 in Piešťany) is a Slovak sprint canoer who competed in the early to mid-2000s. Competing in two Summer Olympics, she earned her best finish of fifth in the K-1 500 m event at Athens in 2004.
