= 2018 ICF Canoe Sprint World Championships – Women's K-2 1000 metres =

Women's K-2 1000 metres at the 2018 ICF Canoe Sprint World Championships
- Venue: Centro de Alto Rendimento de Montemor-o-Velho
- Location: Montemor-o-Velho, Portugal
- Dates: 24 August
- Competitors: 18 from 9 nations
- Winning time: 3:39.811

Medalists
| gold medal | Tamara Csipes-Galbács; Erika Medveczky | Hungary |
| silver medal | Justyna Iskrzycka; Paulina Paszek | Poland |
| bronze medal | Sarah Brüßler; Melanie Gebhardt | Germany |

The women's K-2 1000 metres competition at the 2018 ICF Canoe Sprint World Championships in Montemor-o-Velho took place at the Centro de Alto Rendimento de Montemor-o-Velho.

== Schedule ==
The schedule was as follows:

| Date | Time | Round |
|---|---|---|
| Friday 24 August 2018 | 16:47 | Final |

All times are Western European Summer Time (UTC+1)

== Results ==
With fewer than ten competitors entered, this event was held as a direct final.

| Rank | Kayakers | Country | Time |
|---|---|---|---|
| 1st place, gold medalist(s) | Tamara Csipes-Galbács; Erika Medveczky | Hungary | 3:39.811 |
| 2nd place, silver medalist(s) | Justyna Iskrzycka; Paulina Paszek | Poland | 3:43.758 |
| 3rd place, bronze medalist(s) | Sarah Brüßler; Melanie Gebhardt | Germany | 3:45.091 |
| 4 | Kira Stepanova; Svetlana Chernigovskaya | Russia | 3:48.595 |
| 5 | Roxana Ciur; Elena Meroniac | Romania | 3:52.695 |
| 6 | Pernille Knudsen; Julie Funch | Denmark | 3:53.035 |
| 7 | Natalie Davison; Alanna Bray-Lougheed | Canada | 3:53.218 |
| 8 | Bàrbara Pardo; Estefanía Fernández | Spain | 3:55.402 |
| 9 | Sara Sotero; Rita Fernandes | Portugal | 4:02.432 |
