= Monika Bunke =

German canoeist

Medal record

Women's canoe sprint

World Championships

Representing East Germany
Gold medal – first place	1989 Plovdiv	K-2 5000 m
Gold medal – first place	1989 Plovdiv	K-4 500 m

Representing West Germany
Bronze medal – third place	1990 Poznań	K-2 500 m
Bronze medal – third place	1990 Poznań	K-4 500 m

Representing Germany
Gold medal – first place	1991 Paris	K-4 500 m

Monika Bunke is an East German sprint canoer who competed in the late 1980s and early 1990s. She won five medals at the ICF Canoe Sprint World Championships with three golds (K-2 5000 m: 1989, K-4 500 m: 1989, 1991) and two bronzes (K-2 500 m and K-4 500 m: both 1990).
