= Ines Rudolph =

East German sprint canoer

Medal record

Women's canoe sprint

World Championships
Gold medal – first place	1987 Duisburg	K-4 500 m

Ines Rudolph is an East German sprint canoer who competed in the late 1980s. She won a gold medal in the K-4 500 m event at the 1987 ICF Canoe Sprint World Championships in Duisburg.
