= Adriana Tarasov =

Romanian sprint canoer

Medal record

Women's canoe sprint

World Championships
Bronze medal – third place	1979 Duisburg	K-4 500 m

Adriana Tarasov is a Romanian sprint canoer who competed in the late 1970s. She won a bronze medal in the K-4 500 m event at the 1979 ICF Canoe Sprint World Championships in Duisburg.
