= Maria Haglund =

Swedish canoeist (born 1972)

Medal record

Women's canoe sprint

Olympic Games
Bronze medal – third place	1992 Barcelona	K-4 500 m

World Championships
Silver medal – second place	1991 Paris	K-2 5000 m
Silver medal – second place	1993 Copenhagen	K-4 500 m
Silver medal – second place	1998 Szeged	K-4 200 m
Bronze medal – third place	1994 Mexico City	K-4 500 m
Bronze medal – third place	1995 Duisburg	K-4 200 m
Bronze medal – third place	1997 Dartmouth	K-4 200 m

Maria Haglund (born 6 May 1972) is a Swedish canoe sprinter and marathon canoeist who competed in the 1990s. She won a bronze medal in the K-4 500 m event at the 1992 Summer Olympics in Barcelona.

Haglund also won ICF Canoe Sprint World Championships with three silver medals (K-2 5000 m: 1991, K-4 500 m: 1993, 1998) and three bronze medals (K-4 200 m: 1995, 1997; K-4 500 m: 1994).
