= Karolina Sadalska =

Polish canoeist

Medal record

Women's canoe sprint
Event	1st	2nd	3rd
Olympic Games	0	0	0
World Championships	1	2	2
European Championships	0	0	2
European Games	0	0	0
Total	1	2	4

World Championships
Gold medal – first place	2002 Seville	K-4 1000 m
Silver medal – second place	2001 Poznań	K-4 1000 m
Silver medal – second place	2003 Gainesville	K-4 500 m
Bronze medal – third place	2001 Poznań	K-4 200 m
Bronze medal – third place	2003 Gainesville	K-4 200 m

European Championships
Bronze medal – third place	2001 Milan	K2-200 m
Bronze medal – third place	2002 Szeged	K4-200 m

Karolina Sadalska (born 30 June 1981) is a Polish sprint canoer who won competed in the early to mid-2000s. She won five medals at the ICF Canoe Sprint World Championships with a gold (K-4 1000 m: 2002), two silvers (K-4 500 m: 2003, K-4 1000 m: 2001), and two bronzes (K-4 200 m: 2001, 2003).

Sadalska also finished fourth in the K-4 500 m event at the 2004 Summer Olympics in Athens.
