= Ramona Portwich =

East German canoe racer

Personal information
- Born: 5 January 1967 (age 59) Rostock, East Germany

Sport
- Sport: Kayaking
Medal record
Women's canoe sprint
Olympic Games
Gold medal – first place	1988 Seoul	K-4 500 m
Gold medal – first place	1992 Barcelona	K-2 500 m
Gold medal – first place	1996 Atlanta	K-4 500 m
Silver medal – second place	1992 Barcelona	K-4 500 m
Silver medal – second place	1996 Atlanta	K-2 500 m
World Championships
Gold medal – first place	1987 Duisburg	K-4 500 m
Gold medal – first place	1989 Plovdiv	K-2 5000 m
Gold medal – first place	1990 Poznań	K-2 500 m
Gold medal – first place	1990 Poznań	K-2 5000 m
Gold medal – first place	1990 Poznań	K-4 500 m
Gold medal – first place	1991 Paris	K-2 500 m
Gold medal – first place	1991 Paris	K-2 5000 m
Gold medal – first place	1991 Paris	K-4 500 m
Gold medal – first place	1993 Copenhagen	K-2 5000 m
Gold medal – first place	1993 Copenhagen	K-4 500 m
Gold medal – first place	1994 Mexico City	K-4 500 m
Gold medal – first place	1995 Duisburg	K-2 500 m
Gold medal – first place	1995 Duisburg	K-4 500 m
Silver medal – second place	1994 Mexico City	K-4 200 m
Silver medal – second place	1995 Duisburg	K-4 200 m
Bronze medal – third place	1993 Copenhagen	K-2 500 m

Ramona Portwich (born 5 January 1967 in Rostock) is an East German-German canoe sprinter and marathon canoeist who competed from the late 1980s to the late 1990s. Competing in three Summer Olympics, she won five medals with three golds (K-2 500 m: 1992, K-4 500 m: 1998, 1996) and two silvers (K-2 500 m: 1992, K-4 500 m: 1996).

Portwich also won sixteen medals at the ICF Canoe Sprint World Championships with thirteen golds (K-2 500 m: 1990, 1991, 1995; K-2 5000 m: 1989, 1990, 1991, 1993; K-4 500 m: 1987, 1990, 1991, 1993, 1994, 1995), two silvers (K-4 200 m: 1994, 1995), and a bronze (K-2 500 m: 1993).
