= Inna Zhipulina =

Medal record

Women's canoe sprint

World Championships
Silver medal – second place	1981 Nottingham	K-4 500 m
Silver medal – second place	1982 Belgrade	K-4 500 m
Silver medal – second place	1983 Tampere	K-4 500 m

Inna Zhipulina is a Soviet sprint canoer who competed in the early 1980s. She won two silver medals in the K-4 500 m event at the ICF Canoe Sprint World Championships, earning them in 1981, 1982 and 1983.
