= Maria Nicolae =

Romanian sprint canoer

Medal record

Women's canoe sprint

World Championships
Bronze medal – third place	1978 Belgrade	K-4 500 m
Bronze medal – third place	1979 Duisburg	K-4 500 m

Maria Nicolae is a Romanian sprint canoer who competed in the late 1970s. She won two bronze medals in the K-4 500 m event at the ICF Canoe Sprint World Championships, earning them in 1978 and 1979.
