= Ilona Tőzsér =

Hungarian sprint canoer

Medal record

Women's canoe sprint

World Championships
Silver medal – second place	1973 Tampere	K-4 500 m
Bronze medal – third place	1973 Tampere	K-2 500 m
Bronze medal – third place	1974 Mexico City	K-2 500 m
Bronze medal – third place	1975 Belgrade	K-4 500 m

Ilona Tőzsér is a Hungarian sprint canoer who competed in the mid-1970s. She won four medals at the ICF Canoe Sprint World Championships with a silver (K-2 500 m: 1973) and three bronzes (K-2 500 m: 1973, 1974; K-4 500 m: 1975).
