= Natalya Kalashinkova =

Medal record

Women's canoe sprint

World Championships
Gold medal – first place	1979 Duisburg	K-2 500 m
Silver medal – second place	1978 Belgrade	K-2 500 m
Silver medal – second place	1983 Tampere	K-4 500 m

Natalya Kalashinkova is a Soviet sprint canoer who competed in the late 1970s and early 1980s. She was born in Trakai, Lithuanian SSR. She won three medals at the ICF Canoe Sprint World Championships with a gold (K-2 500 m: 1979) and two silvers (K-2 500 m:1978, K-4 500 m: 1983).
