= Marion Rösiger =

Medal record

Women's canoe sprint

Representing East Germany

World Championships
Gold medal – first place	1977 Sofia	K-2 500 m
Gold medal – first place	1978 Belgrade	K-2 500 m
Gold medal – first place	1978 Belgrade	K-4 500 m
Gold medal – first place	1979 Duisburg	K-4 500 m
Silver medal – second place	1977 Sofia	K-4 500 m
Silver medal – second place	1979 Duisburg	K-2 500 m

Marion Rösiger is a sprint canoer who competed in the late 1970s representing East Germany. She won six medals at the ICF Canoe Sprint World Championships with four golds (K-2 500 m: 1977, 1978; K-4 500 m: 1978, 1979) and two silvers (K-2 500 m: 1979, K-4 500 m: 1977).
