= Roswitha Eberl =

East German canoe sprinter

Medal record

Women's canoe sprint

World Championships
| Gold medal – first place | 1978 Belgrade | K-1 500 m |
| Gold medal – first place | 1978 Belgrade | K-4 500 m |
| Gold medal – first place | 1979 Duisburg | K-1 500 m |
| Gold medal – first place | 1979 Duisburg | K-4 500 m |
| Gold medal – first place | 1981 Nottingham | K-4 500 m |
| Gold medal – first place | 1982 Belgrade | K-4 500 m |

Roswitha Eberl (later Krugmann; born 5 June 1958) is an East German canoe sprinter who competed in the late 1970s. She won six gold medals at the ICF Canoe Sprint World Championships with two in the K-1 500 m (1978, 1979) and four in the K-4 500 m event (1978, 1979, 1981, 1982).
