= Ivanka Muerova =

Bulgarian canoeist

Medal record

Women's canoe sprint

World Championships
Bronze medal – third place	1987 Duisburg	K-2 500 m

Ivanka Muerоva (Bulgarian: Иванка Муерова) is a Bulgarian sprint canoer who competed in the late 1980s. She won a bronze medal in the K-2 500 m event at the 1987 ICF Canoe Sprint World Championships in Duisburg.
