= Martina Bischof =

East German canoe racer

Medal record

Women's canoe sprint

Representing East Germany

Olympic Games
Gold medal – first place	1980 Moscow	K-2 500 m

World Championships
Gold medal – first place	1977 Sofia	K-2 500 m
Gold medal – first place	1978 Belgrade	K-2 500 m
Gold medal – first place	1979 Duisburg	K-4 500 m
Silver medal – second place	1977 Sofia	K-4 500 m
Silver medal – second place	1979 Duisburg	K-2 500 m

Martina Bischof (née Fischer, born 23 November 1957 in Berlin) is an East German canoe sprinter who competed in the late 1970s and early 1980s. She won a gold medal in the K-2 500 m event at the 1980 Summer Olympics in Moscow.

Bischof's husband, Frank-Peter, won a bronze medal in the K-4 1000 m event at the 1976 Summer Olympics in Montreal, Quebec, Canada.

She also won five medals at the ICF Canoe Sprint World Championships with three golds (K-2 500 m: 1977, 1978; K-4 500 m: 1979) and two silvers (K-2 500 m: 1979, K-4 500 m: 1977).
