= Nastasia Ionescu =

Romanian canoeist (born 1954)

Medal record

Women's canoe sprint

Representing Romania

Olympic Games
Gold medal – first place	1984 Los Angeles	K-4 500 m

World Championships
Silver medal – second place	1977 Sofia	K-2 500 m
Bronze medal – third place	1978 Belgrade	K-2 500 m
Bronze medal – third place	1978 Belgrade	K-4 500 m
Bronze medal – third place	1979 Duisburg	K-2 500 m
Bronze medal – third place	1979 Duisburg	K-4 500 m
Bronze medal – third place	1983 Tampere	K-4 500 m

Nastasia Nichitov-Ionescu (born 5 March 1954) is a Romanian sprint canoer who competed from the late 1970s to the early 1980s. Competing in two Summer Olympics, she won a gold medal in the K-4 500 m event at Los Angeles in 1984.

Ionescu also won six medals at the ICF Canoe Sprint World Championships with a silver (K-2 500 m: 1977) and five bronzes (K-2 500 m: 1978, 1979; K-4 500 m: 1978, 1979, 1983).
