= Tamara Popova =

Soviet sprint canoer

Medal record

Women's canoe sprint

World Championships
Gold medal – first place	1973 Tampere	K-4 500 m
Bronze medal – third place	1971 Belgrade	K-2 500 m

Tamara Popova was a Soviet sprint canoer who competed in the early 1970s. She won two medals at the ICF Canoe Sprint World Championships with a gold (K-4 500 m: 1973) and a bronze (K-2 500 m: 1971).
