= Eva Laky =

Hungarian sprint canoer

Medal record

Women's canoe sprint

World Championships
Gold medal – first place	1994 Mexico City	K-2 200 m
Gold medal – first place	1994 Mexico City	K-4 200 m
Bronze medal – third place	1999 Milan	K-2 200 m

Eva Laky is a Hungarian sprint canoer who competed in the mid to late 1990s. She won three medals at the ICF Canoe Sprint World Championships with two golds (K-2 200 m and K-4 200 m: both 1994) and a bronze (K-2 200 m: 1999).
