= Erika Géczi =

Hungarian canoe sprinter (born 1959)

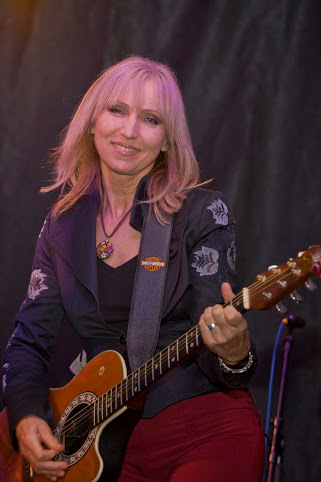

Personal information
- Born: 10 March 1959 (age 67) Budapest, Hungary
- Height: 167 cm (5 ft 6 in)
- Weight: 62 kg (137 lb)

Sport
- Sport: Canoe sprint
- Club: BSE, Budapest
Medal record
Representing Hungary
Olympic Games
Silver medal – second place	1988 Seoul	K-4 500 m
World Championships
Gold medal – first place	1986 Montreal	K-4 500 m
Silver medal – second place	1982 Belgrade	K-2 500 m
Bronze medal – third place	1982 Belgrade	K-4 500 m
Silver medal – second place	1983 Tampere	K-2 500 m
Bronze medal – third place	1985 Mechelen	K-4 500 m
Silver medal – second place	1987 Duisburg	K-4 500 m

Erika Géczi (born 10 March 1959) is a retired Hungarian canoe sprinter who competed in the 1980s. She won a silver medal in the K-4 500 m event at the 1988 Summer Olympics, as well as six medals at the ICF Canoe Sprint World Championships with a gold (K-4 500 m: 1986), three silvers (K-2 500 m: 1982, 1983; K-4 500 m: 1987), and two bronzes (K-4 500 m: 1982, 1985).

Géczi is an accomplished rock musician and singer who performed with the Hungarian bands Sextett, Rockfort, Kormorán and Örökség.
