= Yelena Dudina =

Soviet canoeist

Medal record

Women's canoe sprint

World Championships
Silver medal – second place	1985 Mechelen	K-4 500 m

Yelena Dudina is a Soviet sprint canoer who competed in the mid-1980s. She won a silver medal in the K-4 500 m event at the 1985 ICF Canoe Sprint World Championships in Mechelen.
