= Galina Kreft =

Medal record

Women's canoe sprint

Olympic Games
Gold medal – first place	1976 Montreal	K-2 500 m
Silver medal – second place	1980 Moscow	K-2 500 m

World Championships
Silver medal – second place	1974 Mexico City	K-4 500 m
Silver medal – second place	1975 Belgrade	K-1 500 m
Silver medal – second place	1975 Belgrade	K-2 500 m
Silver medal – second place	1975 Belgrade	K-4 500 m
Silver medal – second place	1979 Duisburg	K-1 500 m
Silver medal – second place	1979 Duisburg	K-4 500 m
Silver medal – second place	1983 Tampere	K-4 500 m

Galina Sergeyevna Kreft-Alekseyeva (Russian: Галина Серге́евна Крефт-Алексеева; 14 March 1950 – 24 February 2005) was a Soviet sprint canoer who competed from the mid-1970s to the early 1980s. She won two medals in two separate Summer Olympics in the K-2 500 m: a gold in 1976 and a silver in 1980.

Kreft also won seven silver medals at the ICF Canoe Sprint World Championships with two in the K-1 500 m (1975, 1979), one in the K-2 500 m (1975), and four in the K-4 500 m events (1974, 1975, 1979, 1983).
