= Katalin Povázsán =

Hungarian canoeist (born 1960)

Medal record

Women's canoe sprint

World Championships
Gold medal – first place	1986 Montreal	K-2 500 m
Silver medal – second place	1982 Belgrade	K-2 500 m
Silver medal – second place	1983 Tampere	K-2 500 m
Silver medal – second place	1987 Duisburg	K-4 500 m
Bronze medal – third place	1982 Belgrade	K-4 500 m

Katalin Povázsán (born 2 August 1960) is a Hungarian sprint canoeist who competed in the 1980s. She won five medals at the ICF Canoe Sprint World Championships with a gold (K-2 500 m: 1986), three silvers (K-2 500 m: 1982, 1983; K-4 500 m: 1987), and a bronze (K-4 500 m: 1982).

Povázsán also finished seventh in the K-1 500 m event at the 1980 Summer Olympics in Moscow.
