= Carsta Genäuß =

German canoe racer

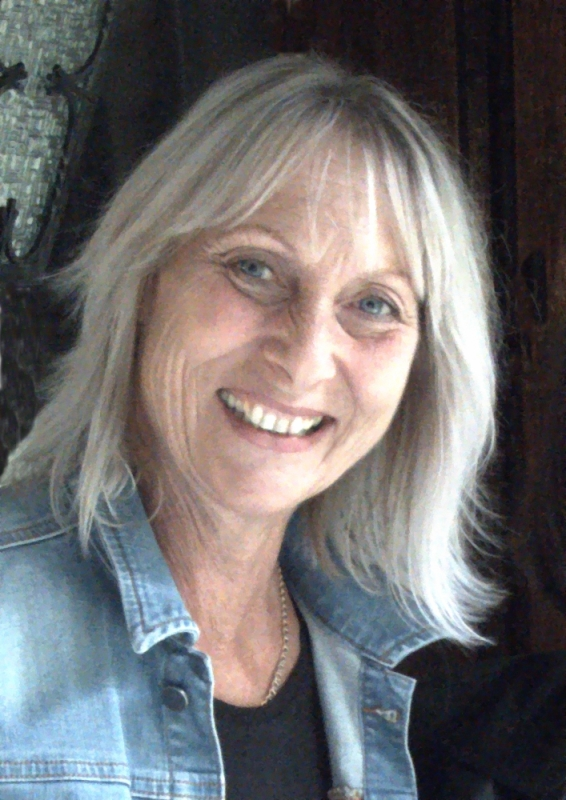
- Genäuß in 2020

Personal information
- Born: 30 November 1959 (age 66) Dresden, East Germany
- Height: 169 cm (5 ft 7 in)
- Weight: 64 kg (141 lb)

Sport
- Sport: Canoe sprint
- Club: SC Einheit Dresden
Medal record
Women's canoe sprint
Olympic Games
Gold medal – first place	1980 Moscow	K-2 500 m
World Championships
Gold medal – first place	1978 Belgrade	K-4 500 m
Gold medal – first place	1981 Nottingham	K-2 500 m
Gold medal – first place	1981 Nottingham	K-4 500 m
Gold medal – first place	1983 Tampere	K-2 500 m
Gold medal – first place	1983 Tampere	K-4 500 m
Gold medal – first place	1985 Mechelen	K-2 500 m
Gold medal – first place	1985 Mechelen	K-4 500 m

Carsta Genäuß (later Kühn, born 30 November 1959) is an East German canoe sprinter who competed from the late 1970s to the mid-1980s. She won a gold medal in the K-2 500 m event at the 1980 Summer Olympics in Moscow.

Genäuß-Kühn also won seven gold medals at the ICF Canoe Sprint World Championships with three in the K-2 500 m event (1981, 1983, 1985) and four in the K-4 500 m (1978, 1981, 1983, 1985).
