= Nelli Korbukova =

Soviet canoeist (1962–2019)

Personal information
- Born: 3 June 1962
- Died: 29 April 2019 (aged 56)

Sport
- Sport: Canoe sprint
Medal record
Representing Soviet Union
World Championships
| Silver medal – second place | 1982 Belgrade | K-4 500 m |
| Silver medal – second place | 1983 Tampere | K-4 500 m |
| Silver medal – second place | 1985 Mechelen | K-1 500 m |
| Silver medal – second place | 1985 Mechelen | K-4 500 m |
| Silver medal – second place | 1986 Montreal | K-2 500 m |
| Silver medal – second place | 1986 Montreal | K-4 500 m |
| Bronze medal – third place | 1990 Poznań | K-2 5000 m |
Summer Universiade
| Silver medal – second place | 1987 Zagreb | K-2 500 m |
| Silver medal – second place | 1987 Zagreb | K-4 500 m |

Nelli Alexeyevna Korbukova (née Yefremova; Russian: Нелли Алексеевна Корбукова (Ефремова); 3 June 1962 – 29 April 2019) was a Soviet sprint canoer who competed in the 1980s. She has won six silver medals at the ICF Canoe Sprint World Championships: one each in the K-1 500 m (1985) and K-2 500m (1986) and four in the K-4 500 m (1982, 1983, 1985, 1986) events; as well as a bronze in K-2 5000 m (1990).
