= Heike Singer =

East German canoe racer

Medal record

Women's canoe sprint

Representing East Germany

Olympic Games
Gold medal – first place	1988 Seoul	K-4 500 m

World Championships
Gold medal – first place	1985 Mechelen	K-4 500 m
Gold medal – first place	1989 Plovdiv	K-2 500 m
Gold medal – first place	1989 Plovdiv	K-4 500 m

Heike Singer (born 14 July 1964 in Rodewisch) is an East German canoe sprinter who competed in the mid late 1980s. She won a gold medal in the K-4 500 m event at the 1988 Summer Olympics in Seoul.

Singer also won three gold medals at the ICF Canoe Sprint World Championships with one in the K-2 500 m (1989) and two in the K-4 500 m (1985, 1989) events.
