= Erika Medveczky =

Hungarian canoeist

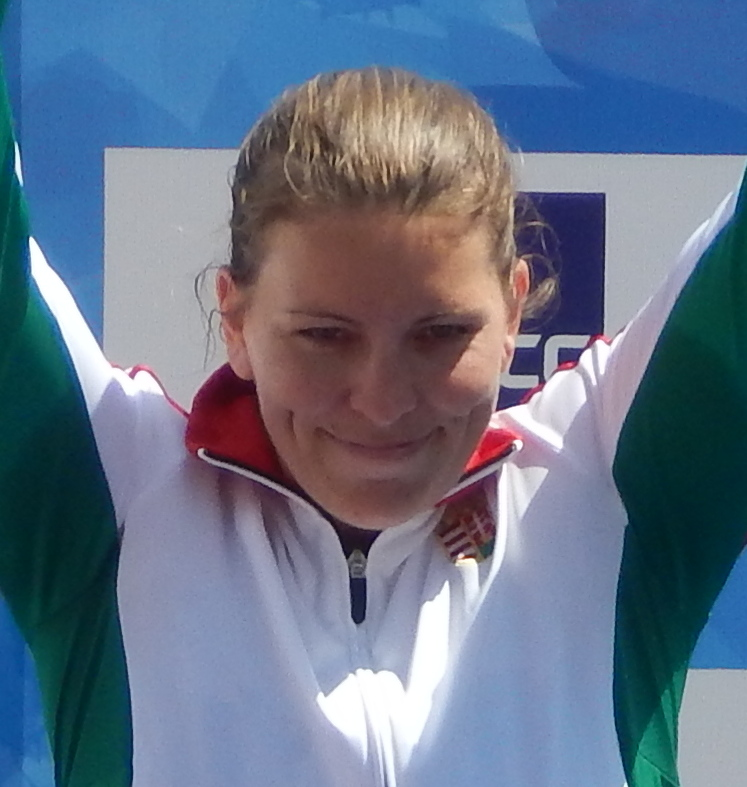
- Medveczky in 2016

Personal information
- Nationality: Hungarian
- Born: 19 June 1988 (age 38) Budapest, Hungary
- Height: 1.70 m (5 ft 7 in)
- Weight: 70 kg (154 lb)

Sport
- Country: Hungary
- Sport: Canoe sprint
- Events: K-1 1000 m, K-1 5000 m, K–2 1000 m, K-4 500 m
Medal record
Women's canoe sprint
Representing Hungary
World Championships
Gold medal – first place	2013 Duisburg	K-1 1000 m
Gold medal – first place	2015 Milan	K-1 1000 m
Gold medal – first place	2017 Račice	K-2 1000 m
Gold medal – first place	2017 Račice	K-4 500 m
Gold medal – first place	2018 Montemor-o-Velho	K-2 1000 m
Gold medal – first place	2018 Montemor-o-Velho	K-4 500 m
Gold medal – first place	2019 Szeged	K-2 1000 m
Gold medal – first place	2019 Szeged	K-4 500 m
Bronze medal – third place	2009 Dartmouth	K-2 1000 m
Bronze medal – third place	2011 Szeged	K-2 1000 m
Bronze medal – third place	2014 Moscow	K-2 1000 m
European Games
Gold medal – first place	2019 Minsk	K-4 500 m
European Championships
Gold medal – first place	2008 Milan	K-2 1000 m
Gold medal – first place	2014 Brandenburg	K-1 5000 m
Gold medal – first place	2017 Plovdiv	K-4 500 m
Gold medal – first place	2018 Belgrade	K-4 500 m
Gold medal – first place	2021 Poznań	K-2 1000 m
Silver medal – second place	2009 Brandenburg	K-4 500 m
Silver medal – second place	2014 Brandenburg	K-2 1000 m
Silver medal – second place	2016 Moscow	K-2 1000 m
Silver medal – second place	2018 Belgrade	K-2 500 m
Bronze medal – third place	2013 Montemor-o-Velho	K-1 1000 m

Erika Medveczky (born 19 June 1988) is a Hungarian sprint canoer who has competed since the late 2000s. She won a bronze medal in the K-2 1000 m event at the 2009 ICF Canoe Sprint World Championships in Dartmouth, which success she repeated two years later at the 2011 ICF Canoe Sprint World Championships in Szeged.
