= Irina Salomykova =

Medal record

Women's canoe sprint

World Championships
Silver medal – second place	1985 Mechelen	K-4 500 m
Bronze medal – third place	1987 Duisburg	K-4 500 m
Bronze medal – third place	1989 Plovdiv	K-2 500 m
Bronze medal – third place	1989 Plovdiv	K-4 500 m
Bronze medal – third place	1990 Poznań	K-1 5000 m

Irina Salomykova-Vaag (November 28, 1961 – April 12, 2015) was a Soviet-born, Russian sprint canoer who competed from the mid-1980s to the early 1990s. She won five medals at the ICF Canoe Sprint World Championships with a silver (K-4 500 m: 1985) and four bronzes (K-1 5000 m: 1990, K-2 500 m: 1989, K-4 500 m: 1987, 1989).

Salomykova-Vaag also competed in two Summer Olympics for two different nations. At the 1988 Summer Olympics in Seoul, she competed in two events for the Soviet Union by finishing fourth in the K-4 500 m and fifth in the K-2 500 m events. Four years later in Barcelona, Salomykova-Vaag competed for the Unified Team by finishing ninth in the K-4 500 m event though she was eliminated in the semifinals of the K-1 500 m event.
