= Kathrin Giese =

East German canoeist

Medal record

Women's canoe sprint

World Championships
Gold medal – first place	1981 Nottingham	K-4 500 m
Gold medal – first place	1982 Belgrade	K-4 500 m
Gold medal – first place	1983 Tampere	K-4 500 m
Gold medal – first place	1985 Mechelen	K-4 500 m
Silver medal – second place	1986 Montreal	K-1 500 m

Kathrin Giese-Stoll is an East German sprint canoer who competed in the early to mid-1980s. She won five medals at the ICF Canoe Sprint World Championships with four golds (1981, (1982, 1983, 1985) and a silver (K-1 500 m: 1986).
