= Anna Olsson (canoeist) =

Swedish canoeist (born 1964)

Medal record

Women's canoe sprint

Olympic Games
Gold medal – first place	1984 Los Angeles	K-2 500 m
Silver medal – second place	1984 Los Angeles	K-4 500 m
Bronze medal – third place	1992 Barcelona	K-4 500 m
Bronze medal – third place	1996 Atlanta	K-4 500 m

World Championships
Gold medal – first place	1993 Copenhagen	K-2 500 m
Silver medal – second place	1993 Copenhagen	K-1 500 m
Silver medal – second place	1993 Copenhagen	K-4 500 m
Silver medal – second place	1994 Mexico City	K-1 200 m
Bronze medal – third place	1991 Paris	K-2 500 m
Bronze medal – third place	1994 Mexico City	K-4 500 m
Bronze medal – third place	1995 Duisburg	K-1 200 m
Bronze medal – third place	1995 Duisburg	K-4 200 m

Anna Olsson (born 14 March 1964 in Timrå) is a Swedish sprint canoeist who competed from the mid-1980s to the early 2000s (decade). Competing in five Summer Olympics, she won four medals with one gold (1984: K-2 500 m), one silver (1984: K-4 500 m), and two bronzes (1992 and 1996: both K-4 500 m).

Olsson also won eight medals at the ICF Canoe Sprint World Championships with a gold (K-2 500 m: 1993), three silvers (K-1 200 m: 1994, K-1 500 m: 1993, K-4 500 m: 1993) and four bronzes (K-1 200 m: 1995, K-2 500 m: 1991, K-4 200 m: 1995, K-4 500 m: 1994).
