= Bärbel Köster =

East German canoeist (1957–2025)

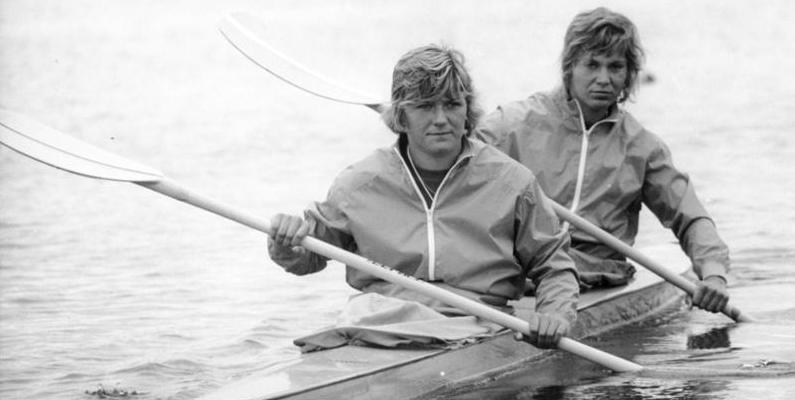
- Köster (left) and Carola Zirzow (right) while training in Montreal, 1976

Medal record

Women's canoe sprint

Olympic Games
Bronze medal – third place	1976 Montreal	K-2 500 m

World Championships
Gold medal – first place	1974 Mexico City	K-2 500 m
Gold medal – first place	1974 Mexico City	K-4 500 m
Gold medal – first place	1975 Belgrade	K-2 500 m
Gold medal – first place	1975 Belgrade	K-4 500 m

Bärbel Köster (later Madaus; 26 May 1957 – 10 September 2025) was an East German canoe sprinter who competed in the mid to late 1970s. She won a bronze medal in the K-2 500 m event at the 1976 Summer Olympics in Montreal.

Köster also won four gold medals at the ICF Canoe Sprint World Championships with two in the K-2 500 m event (both 1974 and 1975) and two in the K-4 500 m event (both 1974 and 1975).

Köster died on 10 September 2025, at the age of 68.
