= Carola Zirzow =

East German canoeist (born 1954)

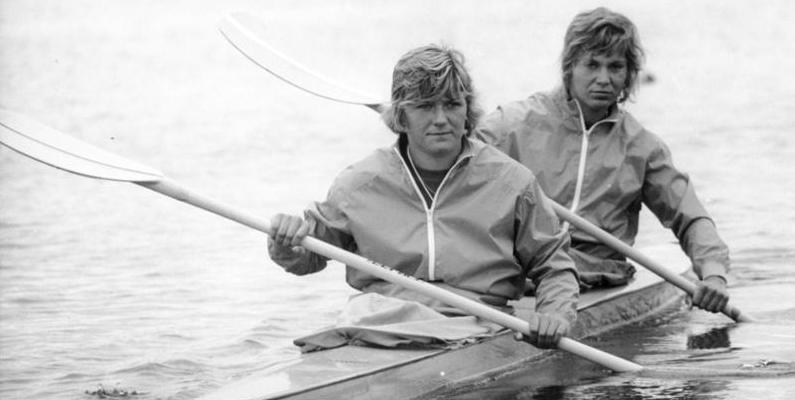
- Zirzow (right) and Bärbel Köster while training in Montreal, 1976

Medal record

Women's canoe sprint

Olympic Games
Gold medal – first place	1976 Montreal	K-1 500 m
Bronze medal – third place	1976 Montreal	K-2 500 m

World Championships
Gold medal – first place	1974 Mexico City	K-4 500 m
Gold medal – first place	1975 Belgrade	K-2 500 m
Gold medal – first place	1975 Belgrade	K-4 500 m

Carola Zirzow (born 15 September 1954, in Prenzlau) is an East German sprint canoer who competed in the mid-1970s. She won two medals at the 1976 Summer Olympics in Montreal with a gold in the K-1 500 m and a bronze in the K-2 500 m events.

Zirzow also won three gold medals at the ICF Canoe Sprint World Championships with one in the K-2 500 m event (1975) and two in the K-4 500 m (1974, 1975).
