= Éva Rakusz =

Hungarian canoeist (born 1961)

Medal record

Women's canoe sprint

Olympic Games
Silver medal – second place	1988 Seoul	K-4 500 m
Bronze medal – third place	1980 Moscow	K-2 500 m

World Championships
Gold medal – first place	1986 Montreal	K-4 500 m
Silver medal – second place	1981 Nottingham	K-1 500 m
Silver medal – second place	1985 Mechelen	K-2 500 m
Silver medal – second place	1987 Duisburg	K-4 500 m
Bronze medal – third place	1982 Belgrade	K-1 500 m
Bronze medal – third place	1982 Belgrade	K-4 500 m
Bronze medal – third place	1985 Mechelen	K-4 500 m

Éva Rakusz (born 13 May 1961, in Miskolc) is a Hungarian sprint canoer who competed in the 1980s. Competing in two Summer Olympics, she won two medals with a silver (K-4 500 m: 1988) and a bronze (K-2 500 m: 1980).

Rakusz also won seven medals at the ICF Canoe Sprint World Championships with a gold (K-4 500 m: 1986), three silvers (K-1 500 m: 1981, K-2 500 m: 1985, K-4 500 m: 1987), and three bronzes (K-1 500 m: 1982, K-4 500 m: 1982, 1985). Nowadays she works as a P.E. teacher at Eötvös József Gimnázium,Tiszaújváros.

She was named Hungarian Sportswoman of The Year in 1981 after having won a silver medal at the World championships the same year.

Awards
Preceded by Magda Maros	Hungarian Sportswoman of The Year; 1981	Succeeded by Pálma Balogh
