= Gao Li =

Chinese canoeist

Medal record

Women's canoe sprint

World Championships
| Silver medal – second place | 2002 Seville | K-4 1000 m |

Gao Li is a Chinese sprint canoer who competed in the early 2000s. She won a silver medal in the K-4 1000 m event at the 2002 ICF Canoe Sprint World Championships in Seville, Spain.
