= Anna Wood (canoeist) =

Dutch-born Australian sprint canoeist

Personal information
- Born: Annemarie Cox; 22 July 1966 (age 59) Roermond, Netherlands
- Height: 1.71 m (5 ft 7 in)
- Weight: 64 kg (141 lb)

Sport
- Country: Australia; Netherlands
- Sport: Canoe sprint
- Event(s): K-1 5000 m, K-2 500 m, K-2 1000 m
- Club: Roermondse Watersport Vereniging Nautilus; Gold Coast Canoe Canoe Club
Medal record
Women's canoe sprint
Representing Netherlands
Olympic Games
Bronze medal – third place	1988 Seoul	K-2 500 m
World Championships
Silver medal – second place	1987 Duisburg	K-2 500 m
Bronze medal – third place	1985 Mechelen	K-2 500 m
Representing Australia
Olympic Games
Bronze medal – third place	1996 Atlanta	K-2 500 m
World Championships
Gold medal – first place	1998 Szeged	K-2 500 m
Gold medal – first place	1998 Szeged	K-2 1000 m
Gold medal – first place	1999 Milan	K-2 1000 m
Silver medal – second place	1991 Paris	K-1 5000 m
Silver medal – second place	1997 Dartmouth	K-2 500 m
Silver medal – second place	1997 Dartmouth	K-2 1000 m

Anna Wood (born Annemarie Cox on 22 July 1966) is a Dutch-born Australian sprint canoeist who competed from the early 1980s to the early 2000s (decade). Competing in four Summer Olympics, she won two bronze medals in the K-2 500 m, earning them in 1988 with the Netherlands and 1996 with Australia.

Wood also won eight medals at the ICF Canoe Sprint World Championships with three golds (K-2 500 m: 1998, K-2 1000 m: 1998, 1999), four silvers (K-1 5000 m: 1991, K-2 500 m: 1987, 1997; K-2 1000 m: 1997), and a bronze (K-2 500 m: 1985).

She also represented the Dutch kayak team from 1983 to 1989.

Wood's husband, Steven (1961–95), won a bronze in the K-4 1000 m event at the 1992 Summer Olympics in Barcelona. She was an Australian Institute of Sport scholarship holder 1990–1994.
