= 1979 ICF Canoe Sprint World Championships =

International canoe competition

The 1979 ICF Canoe Sprint World Championships were held in Duisburg, West Germany.

The men's competition consisted of six Canadian (single paddle, open boat) and nine kayak events. Three events were held for the women, all in kayak.

This was the fifteenth championships in canoe sprint. It was where an incident later referred to as The Česiunas Affair took place when Soviet-born Lithuanian canoer Vladas Česiūnas appeared at the event as a spectator only to vanish. The West German government claimed Česiunas had defected, but the former canoer had returned to the Soviet Union voluntarily several weeks later. During Česiunas' disappearance, he would speak in favor of the 1980 Summer Olympics boycott, more than two months before the Soviet–Afghan War, but later returned to the Soviet Embassy in Bonn. The Soviets toned down their rhetoric about Česiunas' "disappearance" in the West and changed his mind all the while West Germany continued to maintain that he had been kidnapped.

== Medal summary ==
=== Men's ===
==== Canoe ====
Event	Gold	Time	Silver	Time	Bronze	Time
C-1 500 m	Sergey Postrechin (URS)		Ulrich Eicke (GER)		Liubomir Ljubenov (BUL)	
C-1 1000 m	Tamás Wichmann (HUN)		Liubomir Ljubenov (BUL)		Ivan Patzaichin (ROU)	
C-1 10000 m	Tamás Wichmann (HUN)		Sergey Liminovich (URS)		Ivan Patzaichin (ROU)	
C-2 500 m	Romania; Ivan Patzaichin; Petre Capusta		Soviet Union; Sergey Petrenko; Aleksandr Vinogradov		Poland; Marek Łbik; Piotr Pawlowski	
C-2 1000 m	Soviet Union; Vasiliy Jurtzhenko; Yuri Lobanov		Hungary; Tamás Buday; Oszkár Frey		Romania; Toma Simionov; Gheorghe Simionov	
C-2 10000 m	Soviet Union; Vasiliy Jurtzhenko; Yuri Lobanov		Romania; Cherasim Munteanu; Gheorge Titu		Hungary; Tamás Buday; László Vaskúti	

==== Kayak ====
Event	Gold	Time	Silver	Time	Bronze	Time
K-1 500 m	Vladimir Parfenovich (URS)		John Sumegi (AUS)		Peter Hempel (GDR)	
K-1 1000 m	Rüdiger Helm (GDR)		Ion Bîrlădeanu (ROU)		Felix Masár (TCH)	
K-1 10000 m	Milan Janić (YUG)		Einar Rasmussen (NOR)		Nikolay Stepanenko (URS)	
K-2 500 m	Soviet Union; Vladimir Parfenovich; Sergei Chukhray		East Germany; Bernd Olbricht; Rüdiger Helm		France; Alain Lebas; Francis Hervieu	
K-2 1000 m	Norway; Einar Rasmussen; Olaf Søyland		Hungary; Zoltán Bakó; István Szabó		Soviet Union; Sergei Chukhray; Vladimir Tainikov	
K-2 10000 m	Romania; Nicușor Eșanu; Ion Bîrlădeanu		Soviet Union; Nikolay Astapkovich; Vladimir Romanovsky		Spain; Herminio Menéndez; Luis Gregorio Ramos	
K-4 500 m	East Germany; Bernd Duvigneau; Harald Marg; Jürgen Dittrich; Roland Graupner		Soviet Union; Sergey Zhinkarenko; Ionas Sautra; Sergei Chukhray; Vladimir Tainikov		Poland; Ryszard Oborski; Daniel Wełna; Grzegorz Kołtan; Grzegorz Śledziewski	
K-4 1000 m	East Germany; Bernd Duvigneau; Rüdiger Helm; Harald Marg; Bernd Olbricht		Poland; Ryszard Oborski; Daniel Wełna; Grzegorz Kołtan; Grzegorz Śledziewski		Soviet Union; Aleksandr Shaparenko; Sergei Nagornyi; Aleksandr Avdeyev; Ionas Sautra	
K-4 10000 m	Soviet Union; Aleksandr Shaparenko; Sergey Nikolskiy; Vladimir Morozov; Aleksandr Avdeyev		Poland; Andrzej Klimaszewski; Krzysztof Lepianka; Zbigniew Torzecki; Zdzisław Szubski		Hungary; Tamás Benkő; Péter Konecsny; László Szabó; Zoltán Romhany	

=== Women's ===
==== Kayak ====
Event	Gold	Time	Silver	Time	Bronze	Time
K-1 500 m	Roswitha Eberl (GDR)		Galina Alekseyeva (URS)		Klára Rajnai (HUN)	
K-2 500 m	Soviet Union; Natalya Kalashinkova; Nina Doroh		East Germany; Marion Rösiger; Martina Bischof		Romania; Agafia Orlov; Natasia Nichitov	
K-4 500 m	East Germany; Marion Rösiger; Martina Bischof; Birgit Fischer; Roswitha Eberl		Soviet Union; Galina Alekseyeva; Nadezhda Trachimenok; Tatyana Korzhunova; Larissa Nadviga		Romania; Agafia Orlov; Natasia Nichitov; Maria Nicolae; Adriana Tarasov	

== Medals table ==
Rank	Nation	Gold	Silver	Bronze	Total
1	Soviet Union (URS)	7	6	3	16
2	East Germany (GDR)	5	2	1	8
3	Romania (ROU)	2	2	5	9
4	Hungary (HUN)	2	2	3	7
5	Norway (NOR)	1	1	0	2
6	Yugoslavia (YUG)	1	0	0	1
7	Poland (POL)	0	2	2	4
8	Bulgaria (BUL)	0	1	1	2
9	Australia (AUS)	0	1	0	1
9	West Germany (FRG)	0	1	0	1
11	Czechoslovakia (TCH)	0	0	1	1
11	France (FRA)	0	0	1	1
11	Spain (ESP)	0	0	1	1
Totals (13 entries)		18	18	18	54
