= Argentina at the 1992 Summer Olympics =

- IOC code: ARG
- NOC: Argentine Olympic Committee

in Barcelona
- Competitors: 84 (67 men and 17 women) in 17 sports
- Flag bearer: Marcelo Garraffo
- Medals Ranked 54th: Gold 0 Silver 0 Bronze 1 Total 1

Summer Olympics appearances (overview)
- 1900; 1904; 1908; 1912; 1920; 1924; 1928; 1932; 1936; 1948; 1952; 1956; 1960; 1964; 1968; 1972; 1976; 1980; 1984; 1988; 1992; 1996; 2000; 2004; 2008; 2012; 2016; 2020; 2024; 2028

Argentina competed at the 1992 Summer Olympics in Barcelona, Spain. 84 competitors, 67 men and 17 women, took part in 68 events in 17 sports.

== Medalists ==
Medal	Name	Sport	Event	Date
Bronze	Javier Frana; Christian Miniussi	Tennis	Men's doubles	5 August

== Competitors ==
The following is the list of number of competitors in the Games.

Sport	Men	Women	Total
Athletics	3	1	4
Boxing	3	–	3
Canoeing	5	0	5
Cycling	8	0	8
Diving	0	2	2
Fencing	2	3	5
Field hockey	16	0	16
Gymnastics	1	2	3
Judo	7	2	9
Rowing	6	0	6
Sailing	5	2	7
Shooting	2	0	2
Swimming	3	0	3
Table tennis	0	2	2
Tennis	3	3	6
Weightlifting	2	–	2
Wrestling	1	–	1
Total	67	17	84

== Athletics ==
Athlete	Events	Heat		Semi-Final		Final	
Athlete	Events	Result	Rank	Result	Rank	Result	Rank
Antonio Silio	5000 m	Did not start		N/A		Did not advance	
Antonio Silio	10,000 m	28:31.02	8 Q	N/A		28:55.20	18
Marcelo Cascabelo	3000 m steeplechase	8:38.89	10	Did not advance			
Andrés Charadia	Hammer	70.82	19	N/A		Did not advance	
Griselda González	10,000 m	34:09.42	20	N/A		Did not advance	

== Boxing ==
Athlete	Event	Round of 32	Round of 16	Quarterfinals	Semifinals	Final	
Athlete	Event	Opposition Result	Opposition Result	Opposition Result	Opposition Result	Opposition Result	Rank
Remigio Molina	Bantamweight	Vega (ESP); W 14–4	Calderón (MEX); W 5–4	Achik (MAR); L 5–15	Did not advance		
Jorge Maglione	Featherweight	Soltani (ALG); L (RSCH)	Did not advance				
Elio Ibarra	Heavyweight	Teuchiert (GER); L 1–5	Did not advance				

Key:

- RSCH = Referee stopped contest due to head injury

== Canoeing ==
=== Flatwater ===
Athlete	Event	Heats		Repechage		Semifinals		Final	
Athlete	Event	Time	Rank	Time	Rank	Time	Rank	Time	Rank
Juan de la Cruz Labrin; Fernando Chaparro	Men's K-2 500 m	1:41.77	5	1:37.70	7	Did not advance			
Juan de la Cruz Labrin; Cristian Maino; José Luis Marello; Fernando Chaparro	Men's K-4 1000 m	3:09.28	6	N/A		3:11.44	9	Did not advance	

=== Slalom ===
Athlete	Event	Run 1		Run 2		Final	
Athlete	Event	Time	Points	Time	Points	Points	Rank
Juan Maricich	Men's K-1	2:10.05	140.05	2:23.67	198.67	198.67	40

== Cycling ==
Eight male cyclists represented Argentina in 1992.

=== Track ===
Sprints

Athlete	Event	Qualifying		1/16 finals (Repechage)	1/8 finals (Repechage)	Quarterfinals	Semifinals	Finals (5th-8th)	
Athlete	Event	Time Speed (km/h)	Rank	Opposition Time Speed (km/h)	Opposition Time Speed (km/h)	Opposition Times Speed (km/h)	Opposition Time Speed (km/h)	Opposition Time Speed (km/h)	Rank
José Lovito	Men's sprint	11.024; 65.312	13 Q	Chiappa (ITA); Alleyne (BAR); W 11.338; 63.503	Moreno (ESP); L 11.216; 64.194; Ķiksis (LAT); W 11.266; 63.909	Neiwand (AUS); L L	N/A	2nd	6

Pursuits

Athlete	Event	Qualifying		1st round		Semifinals		Finals	
Athlete	Event	Time	Rank	Opposition Time	Rank	Opposition Time	Rank	Opposition Time	Rank
Hernán López	Men's individual pursuit	overtaken		N/A		Did not advance			
Ángel Colla; Gustavo Guglielmone; Carlos Pérez; Fabio Placanica	Men's team pursuit	4:33.860	17	Did not advance					

Time trials

Athlete	Event	Time	Rank
Sergio Rolando	Men's 1000 metre time trial	1:08.267	22

Points races

Athlete	Event	Qualifying		Finals	
Athlete	Event	Points	Rank	Points	Rank
Erminio Suárez	Men's points race	11 (-1 lap)	12 Q	16 (same lap)	10

== Diving ==
Women

Athlete	Events	Preliminary		Final	
Athlete	Events	Points	Rank	Points	Rank
Verónica Ribot	10 m platform	292.26	9 Q	384.03	8
Verónica Ribot	3 m individual springboard	282.54	9 Q	447.42	10
Karla Goltman	3 m individual springboard	254.28	23	Did not advance	

== Fencing ==
Athlete	Event	Preliminary round		Round of 64	Round of 32	Round of 16	Quarterfinals	Semifinals	Final
Athlete	Event	W–L Record	Overall Rank	Opposition Result	Opposition Result	Opposition Result	Opposition Result	Opposition Result	Opposition Result
Rafael di Tella	Men's individual épée	3–3	41	Schmitt (GER); L 2–5, 0–5	Did not advance				
Alberto González	Men's individual foil	1–4	50	Did not advance					
Andrea Chiuchich	Women's individual foil	1–5	40	Did not advance					
Sandra Giancola	Women's individual foil	1–5	42	Did not advance					
Yanina Iannuzzi	Women's individual foil	0–6	43	Did not advance					

== Field hockey ==
=== Men ===
Team roster and tournament statistics

Coach: Jorge Ruiz

№	Player	GP	G	S	FG	PC	PS	Green card	Yellow card	Red card
1	Emanuel Roggero (GK)	6	0							
2	Marcelo Garraffo	1	0							
3	Adrián Mandarano	7	0							
4	Diego Allona	6	1							
5	Rodolfo Pérez	7	0							
6	Edgardo Pailos	7	0							
7	Fernando Falchetto	3	0							
8	Alejandro Siri	7	0							
9	Carlos Geneyro	7	1							
10	Gabriel Minadeo	6	0							
11	Fernando Ferrara	7	11							
12	Pablo Moreira	1	0							
13	Aldo Ayala	4	0							
14	Martín Sordelli	6	1							
15	Daniel Ruiz	0								
16	Pablo Lombi	7	0							
Team totals		7	14	30	7	7				

Legend: GP – Games played; G – Goals; S – Shots; FG – Field Goals; PC – Penalty Corners; PS – Penalty Strokes; Green Cards; (yellow card) Yellow Cards; (red card) Red Cards

Preliminary Round (Pool A)

Team	Pld	W	D	L	GF	GA	Pts
Australia	5	4	1	0	20	2	9
Germany	5	4	1	0	16	4	9
Great Britain	5	3	0	2	7	10	6
India	5	2	0	3	4	8	4
Argentina	5	1	0	4	3	12	2
Egypt	5	0	0	5	4	18	0

Qualified for semifinals

Australia	7 – 0	Argentina

Umpires:
José Luis Gortazar (ESP)
Guillaume Langle (FRA)

India	1 – 0	Argentina

Umpires:
Nikolai Stepanov (RUS)
Adriano De Vecchi (ITA)

Egypt	0 – 1	Argentina

Umpires:
Nikolai Stepanov (RUS)
Mohamed Iqbal Bali (PAK)

Argentina	1 – 2	Great Britain

Umpires:
Patrick van Beneden (BEL)
Peter von Reth (NED)

Germany	2 – 1	Argentina

Umpires:
José Luis Gortazar (ESP)
Peter von Reth (NED)

9th to 12th place classification

August 5

Argentina	4 – 6 (AET)	Malaysia

Umpires:
T. S. Bhullar (IND)
Claude Seidler (GER)

11th place match

August 1
8:30

Argentina	7 – 3	Egypt

Umpires:
Richard Wolter (GER)
Donald Prior (AUS)

== Gymnastics ==
=== Artistic ===
Athlete	Event	Apparatus								Qualification		Final	
Athlete	Event	Floor	Pommel Horse	Rings	Vault	Parallel Bars	Horizontal Bar	Uneven bars	Balance beam	Total	Rank	Total	Rank
Isidro Ibarrondo	Men's all-around	17.950	15.975	18.075	18.550	18.120	18.775	N/A		107.450	87	Did not advance	
Isidro Ibarrondo	Floor	17.950	N/A							17.950	89	Did not advance	
Isidro Ibarrondo	Pommel horse	N/A	15.975	N/A						15.975	91	Did not advance	
Isidro Ibarrondo	Rings	N/A		18.075	N/A					18.075	86	Did not advance	
Isidro Ibarrondo	Vault	N/A			18.550	N/A				18.550	79	Did not advance	
Isidro Ibarrondo	Parallel bars	N/A				18.125	N/A			18.125	85	Did not advance	
Isidro Ibarrondo	Horizontal bar	N/A					18.775	N/A		18.775	63	Did not advance	
Andrea Giordano	Women's all-around	19.262	N/A		18.924	N/A		19.050	18.924	76.586	61	Did not advance	
Andrea Giordano	Floor	19.262	N/A							19.262	79	Did not advance	
Andrea Giordano	Vault	N/A			18.924	N/A				18.924	59	Did not advance	
Andrea Giordano	Uneven bars	N/A						19.050	N/A	19.050	69	Did not advance	
Andrea Giordano	Balance beam	N/A							19.350	19.350	53	Did not advance	
Romina Plataroti	Women's all-around	19.512	N/A		19.050	N/A		19.137	18.974	76.673	59	Did not advance	
Romina Plataroti	Floor	19.512	N/A							19.512	47	Did not advance	
Romina Plataroti	Vault	N/A			19.050	N/A				19.050	50	Did not advance	
Romina Plataroti	Uneven bars	N/A						19.137	N/A	19.137	63	Did not advance	
Romina Plataroti	Balance beam	N/A							18.974	18.974	72	Did not advance	

== Rowing ==
Athlete(s)	Event	Heats		Repechage		Semifinals		Final	
Athlete(s)	Event	Time	Rank	Time	Rank	Time	Rank	Time	Rank
Sergio Fernández González	Men's single sculls	6:59.14	1 Q	Bye		6:53.40	1 Q	7:15.53	6
Max Holdo, Guillermo Pfaab	Men's double sculls	7:05.49	3	6:44.27	4	Did not advance			
Marcelo Pieretti, Gustavo Pacheco, Andrés Seperizza	Men's coxed pair	7:39.52	5	7:32.70	5	Did not advance			

== Sailing ==
Men

Athlete	Event	Race											Score	Rank
Athlete	Event	1	2	3	4	5	6	7	8	9	10	11	Score	Rank
Carlos Espínola	Lechner A-390	23	28	28	(51); PMS	20	29	26	18	32	32	N/A	236	24
Mariano Castro, Gustavo Warburg	470	34	22	32	(39)	28	15	31	N/A				162	29
Alberto Zanetti, Carlos Gabutti	Star	(33); PMS	27	26	29	27	19	15	N/A				143	23

Women

Athlete	Event	Race											Score	Rank
Athlete	Event	1	2	3	4	5	6	7	8	9	10	11	Score	Rank
María Espínola	Lechner A-390	24	25	23	19	11.7	24	25	19	(31); PMS	N/A		194.7	18
Gisela Williams	Europe	20	13	(25)	23	29	16	17	N/A				114	17

Key

- PMS – Premature start

== Shooting ==
Athlete	Event	Qualification		Semifinal		Final		Rank
Athlete	Event	Score	Rank	Score	Rank	Score	Total	Rank
Ricardo Rusticucci	Men's 10 m air rifle	560	44	N/A		Did not advance		44
Ricardo Rusticucci	Men's 50 m rifle three positions	1110	42	N/A		Did not advance		42
Ricardo Rusticucci	Men's 50 m rifle prone	591	=31	N/A		Did not advance		=31
Firmo Roberti	Skeet	148	6 Q	49	10	Did not advance		10

== Swimming ==
Men

Athlete	Events	Heat		Final	
Athlete	Events	Time	Rank	Time	Rank
Sebastián Lasave	Men's 100 m freestyle	53.07	49	Did not advance	
Sebastián Lasave	Men's 100 m backstroke	58.22	35	Did not advance	
Andrés Minelli	Men's 1500 m freestyle	15:44.55	18	Did not advance	
Andrés Minelli	Men's 400 m medley	4:33.41	26	Did not advance	
Pablo Minelli	Men's 100 m breaststroke	DSQ		Did not advance	
Pablo Minelli	Men's 200 m breaststroke	2:18.70	24	Did not advance	

Key

- DSQ – Disqualified

== Table Tennis ==
Athlete	Event	Preliminary round	Round of 16	Quarterfinals	Semifinals	Final
Athlete	Event	Opposition Result	Opposition Result	Opposition Result	Opposition Result	Opposition Result
Hae-Ja Kim	Women's singles	Hrachova (TCH); L 0–2; Hooman (NED); L 0–2; Kosaka (BRA); W 2–0	Did not advance			
Alejandra Gabaglio, Hae-Ja Kim	Women's doubles	Chai - Chan (HKG); L 0–2; Coubat - Wang (FRA); L 0–2; Gee - Hugh (USA); L 0–2	N/A	Did not advance		

== Tennis ==
Men

Athlete	Event	Round of 64	Round of 32	Round of 16	Quarterfinals	Semifinals	Final	
Athlete	Event	Opposition Score	Opposition Score	Opposition Score	Opposition Score	Opposition Score	Opposition Score	Rank
Javier Frana	Singles	Arraya (PER); W 6–2, 6–0, 6–7^{(3–7)}, 6–7^{(3–7)}, 6–2	Santoro (FRA); L 6–4, 2–6, 1–6, 1–6	Did not advance				=17
Alberto Mancini	Singles	Chang (USA); L 1–6, 4–6, 6–3, 0–6	Did not advance					=33
Christian Miniussi	Singles	Santoro (FRA); L 1–6, 6–7^{(3–7)}, 4–6	Did not advance					=33
Javier Frana, Christian Miniussi	Doubles	N/A	Castle (GBR); Wilkinson (GBR); W 6–4, 6–4, 7–6^{(7–1)}	Forget (FRA); Leconte (FRA); W 4–6, 6–7^{(3–7)}, 6–4, 6–4, 6–3	Hlasek (SUI); Rosset (SUI); W 2–6, 7–6^{(7–3)}, 3–6, 6–2, 6–2	Becker (GER); Stich (GER); L 6–7^{(3–7)}, 2–6, 7–6^{(7–4)}, 6–2, 4–6	Did not advance	Bronze

Women

Athlete	Event	Round of 64	Round of 32	Round of 16	Quarterfinals	Semifinals	Final	
Athlete	Event	Opposition Score	Opposition Score	Opposition Score	Opposition Score	Opposition Score	Opposition Score	Rank
Florencia Labat	Singles	Rittner (GER); L 3–6, 3–6	Did not advance					=17
Mercedes Paz	Singles	Basuki (POL); L 1–6, 4–6	Did not advance					=33
Patricia Tarabini	Singles	de Swardt (RSA); W 6–4, 6–2	Capriati (USA); L 4–6, 1–6	Did not advance				=17
Mercedes Paz, Patricia Tarabini	Doubles	N/A	Feistel (POL); Teodorowicz (POL); W 6–4, 4–6, 6–3	Li (CHN); Tang (CHN); W 6–0, 6–1	Meskhi (EUN); Zvereva (EUN); L 2–6, 3–6	Did not advance		=5

== Weightlifting ==
Women

Athlete	Event	Snatch	Clean & jerk	Total	Rank
Gustavo Majauskas	Men's –60 kg	105.0	145.0	250.0	24
Marcelo Gandolfo	Men's –60 kg	107.5	135.0	242.5	26

== Wrestling ==
Athlete	Event	Preliminary round	Final
Athlete	Event	Opposition Result	Opposition Result
Diego Potap	Men's Greco-Roman 82 kg	Anton Arghira (ROU); L 0 – 13; David Martinetti (SUI); L 0 – 4	Did not advance

== See also ==
- Argentina at the 1991 Pan American Games
