= New Zealand at the 1992 Summer Olympics =

- IOC code: NZL
- NOC: New Zealand Olympic and Commonwealth Games Association
- Website: www.olympic.org.nz

in Barcelona
- Competitors: 134 (92 men, 42 women) in 17 sports
- Flag bearer: Mark Todd
- Medals Ranked 28th: Gold 1 Silver 4 Bronze 5 Total 10

Summer Olympics appearances (overview)
- 1908; 1912; 1920; 1924; 1928; 1932; 1936; 1948; 1952; 1956; 1960; 1964; 1968; 1972; 1976; 1980; 1984; 1988; 1992; 1996; 2000; 2004; 2008; 2012; 2016; 2020; 2024

Other related appearances
- Australasia (1908–1912)

New Zealand competed at the 1992 Summer Olympics in Barcelona, Spain. The New Zealand Olympic Committee was represented by 134 athletes and 70 officials. 134 competitors, 92 men and 42 women, took part in 87 events in 17 sports. Ralph Roberts was the team's Chef de Mission.

== Medalists ==
Medal	Name	Sport	Event	Date
Gold	Barbara Kendall	Sailing	Women's Lechner A-390	4 August
Silver	Vicky Latta; Andrew Nicholson; Blyth Tait; Mark Todd	Equestrian	Team eventing	30 July
Silver	Danyon Loader	Swimming	Men's 200 m butterfly	30 July
Silver	Don Cowie; Rod Davis	Sailing	Star	4 August
Silver	Leslie Egnot; Jan Shearer	Sailing	Women's 470	4 August
Bronze	Gary Anderson	Cycling	Men's individual pursuit	29 July
Bronze	Blyth Tait	Equestrian	Individual eventing	30 July
Bronze	Lorraine Moller	Athletics	Women's marathon	1 August
Bronze	Craig Monk	Sailing	Men's Finn	4 August
Bronze	David Tua	Boxing	Men's heavyweight	8 August

Medals by sport
Sport	Gold medal	Silver medal	Bronze medal	Total
Sailing	1	2	1	4
Equestrian	0	1	1	2
Swimming	0	1	0	1
Athletics	0	0	1	1
Boxing	0	0	1	1
Cycling	0	0	1	1
Total	1	4	5	10

Medals by gender
Gender	Gold medal	Silver medal	Bronze medal	Total
Male	0	1	3	4
Female	1	1	1	3
Mixed / open	0	2	1	3
Total	1	4	5	10

== Competitors ==
The following is the list of number of competitors in the Games.

Sport	Men	Women	Total
Archery	0	1	1
Athletics	7	6	13
Badminton	2	2	4
Boxing	3	–	3
Canoeing	8	0	8
Cycling	11	3	14
Diving	0	1	1
Equestrian	5	1	6
Fencing	1	0	1
Field hockey	16	15	31
Judo	2	2	4
Rowing	10	2	12
Sailing	13	4	17
Shooting	2	1	3
Swimming	8	3	11
Table tennis	2	1	3
Wrestling	2	–	2
Total	92	42	134

== Archery ==
New Zealand sent one archer to Barcelona. She did not advance to the elimination rounds.

Athlete	Event	Ranking round						Round 1	Round 2	Quarterfinal	Semifinal	Final	Rank
Athlete	Event	30 m	50 m	60 m	70 m	Total	Rank	Opposition Result	Opposition Result	Opposition Result	Opposition Result	Opposition Result	Rank
Faye Johnstone	Women's individual	341	295	323	302	1261	37	did not advance					37

== Athletics ==
=== Track and road ===
Athlete	Event	Heat		Quarterfinal		Semifinal		Final	
Athlete	Event	Result	Rank (Note: Ranks given are within the heat)	Result	Rank (Note: Ranks given are within the quarterfinal)	Result	Rank	Result	Rank
Marguerite Buist	Women's marathon	—N/a						DNF	
Derek Froude	Men's marathon	—N/a						2:19.37	35
Robbie Johnston	Men's 5000 m	13:57.87	9	—N/a				did not advance	
Anne Judkins	Women's 10 km walk	—N/a						45:28	9
Lorraine Moller	Women's marathon	—N/a						2:33.59	3rd place, bronze medalist(s)
Lesley Morton	Women's 10,000 m	33:51.06	17	—N/a				did not advance	
Cameron Taylor	Men's 200 m	20.91	2 Q	20.83	5	did not advance			
Rex Wilson	Men's marathon	—N/a						2:15.51	16

=== Field ===
Athlete	Event	Qualification		Final	
Athlete	Event	Result	Rank	Result	Rank
Paul Gibbons	Men's pole vault	NM		did not advance	
Gavin Lovegrove	Men's javelin throw	81.04 m	4	77.08 m	9
Kirsten Smith	Women's javelin throw	59.34 m	17	did not advance	

=== Combined ===
Athlete	Event	100 m hurdles	High jump	Shot put	200 m	Long jump	Javelin throw	800 m	Overall points	Rank
Joanne Henry	Women's heptathlon	14.55; 902 pts	NH; 0 pts	Withdrew					DNF	

Athlete	Event	100 m	Long jump	Shot put	High jump	400 m	110 m hurdles	Discus throw	Pole vault	Javelin throw	1500 m	Overall points	Rank
Simon Poelman	Men's decathlon	12.22; 608 pts	NM; 0 pts	Withdrew								DNF	

== Badminton ==
Athlete	Event	Round of 64	Round of 32	Round of 16	Quarterfinals	Semifinals	Final	Rank
Athlete	Event	Opposition Result	Opposition Result	Opposition Result	Opposition Result	Opposition Result	Opposition Result	Rank
Dean Galt	Men's singles	Jogis (USA); L 1–15 3–15	did not advance					=33
Kerrin Harrison	Men's singles	Antropov (EUN); L 3–15 10–15	did not advance					=33
Rhona Robertson	Women's singles	Dimbour (FRA); W 12–10 12–9	Plungwech (THA); L 9–12 11–2 9–12	did not advance				=17
Dean Galt; Kerrin Harrison	Men's doubles	—N/a	Holst-Christensen / Lund (DEN); L 0–15 2–15	did not advance				=17
Tammy Jenkins; Rhona Robertson	Women's doubles	—N/a	Gil / Shim (KOR); L 4–15 2–15	did not advance				=17

== Boxing ==
Athlete	Event	Round 1	Round 2	Quarterfinals	Semifinals	Final	Rank
Athlete	Event	Opposition Result	Opposition Result	Opposition Result	Opposition Result	Opposition Result	Rank
Trevor Shailer	Men's light welterweight	Szűcs (HUN); L 0 – 7	did not advance				=17
Sililo Figota	Men's light welterweight	Beyer (GER); L 2 – 16	did not advance				=17
David Tua	Men's heavyweight	Bye	Ortega (ESP); W RSC-2	Rückschloss (TCH); W RSC-3	Izonritei (NGR); L 7 – 12	Did not advance	3rd place, bronze medalist(s)

== Canoeing ==
=== Slalom ===
Athlete	Event	Run 1			Run 2			Best total	Rank
Athlete	Event	Time	Points	Total	Time	Points	Total	Best total	Rank
Donald Johnstone	Men's K-1	1:50.71	10	120.71	1:52.73	5	117.73	117.73	25

=== Sprint ===
Athlete	Event	Heats		Repechages		Semifinals		Final	
Athlete	Event	Time	Rank	Time	Rank	Time	Rank	Time	Rank
John MacDonald	Men's K-1 500 m	1:44.37	5 R	1:43.24	2 Q	1:43.41	6	did not advance	
John MacDonald	Men's K-1 1000 m	3:43.17	3 R	3:35.07	3 Q	3:38.95	6	did not advance	
Ian Ferguson; Paul MacDonald	Men's K-2 500 m	1:36.43	5 R	1:32.28	4 q	1:31.02	6	did not advance	
Ian Ferguson; Paul MacDonald	Men's K-2 1000 m	3:18.47	2 Q	Bye		3:19.29	5 q	3:26.84	8
Richard Boyle; Finn O'Connor; Stephen Richards; Mark Scheib	Men's K-4 1000 m	3:03.58	6 Q	—N/a		3:00.66	8	did not advance	

== Cycling ==
Fourteen cyclists, eleven men and three women, represented New Zealand in 1992. Gary Anderson won a bronze medal in the individual pursuit.

=== Road ===
Athlete	Event	Time	Rank
Tom Bamford	Men's individual road race	4:36:31	73
Joann Burke	Women's individual road race	2:05:03	30
Brian Fowler	Men's individual road race	4:35:56	59
Graeme Miller	Men's individual road race	4:35:56	51
Rosalind Reekie	Women's individual road race	2:23:52	49
Brian Fowler; Paul Leitch; Graeme Miller; Chris Nicholson	Men's team time trial	2:08:10	10

=== Track ===
Men's 1 km time trial

Athlete	Time	Rank
Jon Andrews	1:05.240	7

Men's points race

Athlete	Qualifying			Final		
Athlete	Points	Laps behind	Rank	Points	Laps behind	Rank
Glenn McLeay	15	0	2 Q	30	0	4

Men's sprint

Athlete	Qualifying		Round 1	Round 1 repechage heat	Round 1 repechage final	Round 2	Round 2 repechage	Quarterfinals	Semifinals	Final	Rank
Athlete	Time	Rank	Opposition Result	Opposition Result	Opposition Result	Opposition Result	Opposition Result	Opposition Result	Opposition Result	Opposition Result	Rank
Jon Andrews	11.102	16	Fiedler (GER); L R	van Hameren (NED); W 11.251 Q	Furrer (SUI); W 11.701 Q	Harnett (CAN); Carpenter (USA); 2 R	Chiappa (ITA); L	did not advance			

Pursuit

Athlete	Event	Qualification		Quarterfinals	Semifinals	Final	Rank
Athlete	Event	Time	Rank	Opposition Time	Opposition Time	Opposition Time	Rank
Gary Anderson	Men's individual pursuit	4:32.253	4 Q	Ermenault (FRA); W 4:27.954	Lehmann (GER); L 4:31.061	Did not advance	3rd place, bronze medalist(s)
Jacqui Nelson	Women's individual pursuit	3:51.259	10	did not advance			
Gary Anderson; Nigel Donnelly; Carlos Marryatt; Stuart Williams; Glenn McLeay	Men's team pursuit	4:21.145	7 Q	Germany; L ovtk	did not advance		

== Diving ==
Athlete	Event	Preliminaries		Final	
Athlete	Event	Points	Rank	Points	Rank
Tania Paterson	Women's 10 m platform	254.04	24	did not advance	

== Equestrian ==
=== Eventing ===
Rider	Horse	Event	Dressage		Cross-country		Jumping		Overall	
Rider	Horse	Event	Points	Rank	Points	Rank	Points	Rank	Points	Rank
Vicky Latta	Chief	Individual	58.00	=19	24.40	6	5.00	=9	87.80	4
Andrew Nicholson	Spinning Rhombus	Individual	61.20	=27	9.20	3	45.00	62	115.40	16
Blyth Tait	Messiah	Individual	78.80	70	8.80	2	0.00	=1	87.60	3rd place, bronze medalist(s)
Mark Todd	Welton Greylag	Individual	47.40	5	DNF		DNS		DNF	
Vicky Latta; Andrew Nicholson; Blyth Tait; Mark Todd	As above	Team	166.60	4	42.80	1	50.00	=13	290.80	2nd place, silver medalist(s)

=== Jumping ===
==== Individual ====
Athlete	Horse	Qualifying					Final			Rank
Athlete	Horse	Round 1	Round 2	Round 3	Total points	Rank	Round 1	Round 2	Total faults	Rank
Bruce Goodin	Reservation	22.50	29.00	45.00	96.50	59	did not advance			
Mark Todd	Double Take	70.50	72.50	–	143.00	=37 Q	20.00	did not advance		
Harvey Wilson	Mayday	36.00	45.50	48.00	129.50	48	did not advance			

==== Team ====
Athlete	Horse	Round 1		Round 2		Total	Rank
Athlete	Horse	Faults	Rank	Faults	Rank	Total	Rank
Bruce Goodin; Mark Todd; Harvey Wilson	Reservation; Double Take; Mayday	38.25	16	28.75	11	67.00	15

== Fencing ==
One male fencer represented New Zealand in 1992.

Men's individual épée

Athlete	Round 1 pool						Final pool				Final pool barrage				Quarterfinal	Semifinal	Final	Rank
Athlete	Opponent Result	Opponent Result	Opponent Result	Opponent Result	Opponent Result	Opponent Result	Opponent Result	Opponent Result	Opponent Result	Opponent Result	Opponent Result	Opponent Result	Opponent Result	Opponent Result	Opponent Result	Opponent Result	Opponent Result	Rank
Gavin McLean	da Ponte (PAR); W 5–1	Youssef (LIB); W 5–2	Jacquet (SUI); W 5–5	Randazzo (ITA); L 0–5	Pop (ROU); L 4–5	Rivas (COL); L 2–5	Nowosielski (CAN); L 1–2	Did not advance										

== Field hockey ==
=== Men's team competition ===
- Preliminary round (Pool B)

- New Zealand – Spain 0–3
- New Zealand – Pakistan 0–1
- New Zealand – The Netherlands 3–4
- New Zealand – Malaysia 2–3
- New Zealand – Unified Team 2–1

- Classification matches

- 5th–8th place: New Zealand – Great Britain 2–3
- 7th–8th place: New Zealand – India 2–3 → 8th place

- Team roster

- ( 1.) Peter Daji (captain)
- ( 2.) Brett Leaver
- ( 3.) David Grundy
- ( 4.) Scott Hobson
- ( 5.) Grant McLeod
- ( 6.) Peter Miskimmin
- ( 7.) Paresh Patel
- ( 8.) David Penfold
- ( 9.) John Radovonich
- (10.) Craig Russ
- (11.) Greg Russ
- (12.) Umesh Parag
- (13.) Jamie Smith
- (14.) Anthony Thornton
- (15.) Scott Anderson (gk)
- (16.) Ian Woodley (gk)

=== Women's team competition ===
- Preliminary round (Pool B)

- New Zealand – South Korea 0–6
- New Zealand – The Netherlands 0–2
- New Zealand – Great Britain 2–3

- Classification matches

- 5th–8th place: New Zealand – Australia 1–5
- 7th–8th place: New Zealand – Canada 0–2 → 8th place

- Team roster

- ( 1.) Elaine Jensen (gk)
- ( 2.) Helen Shearer (gk)
- ( 3.) Mary Clinton (captain)
- ( 4.) Tina Bell-Kake
- ( 5.) Christine Arthur
- ( 6.) Shane Collins
- ( 7.) Sapphire Cooper
- ( 8.) Kylie Foy
- ( 9.) Sue Duggan
- (10.) Susan Furmage
- (11.) Trudy Kilkolly
- (12.) Anna Lawrence
- (13.) Kieren O'Grady
- (14.) Mandy Smith
- (15.) Robyn Toomey
- (16.) Kate Trolove

== Judo ==
Athlete	Event	Elimination pool				Repechage pool			Final	Rank
Athlete	Event	Opponent Result	Opponent Result	Opponent Result	Opponent Result	Opponent Result	Opponent Result	Opponent Result	Opponent Result	Rank
Steve Corkin	Men's lightweight	Bye	Chung (KOR); L	did not advance		Seck (SEN); L	did not advance			17
Donna Hilton	Women's extra lightweight	—N/a	Souakri (ALG); L	did not advance		Villapol (VEN); L	did not advance			=13
Nicola Morris	Women's half middleweight	—N/a	Gu (KOR); L	did not advance		Zhang (CHN); L	did not advance			=13
Graeme Spinks	Men's half middleweight	Haanpää (FIN); W	Varayev (EUN); L	did not advance						=22

== Rowing ==
New Zealand qualified four boats for the 1992 Summer Olympics: men's single sculls, men's coxless four, men's coxed four, and women's double sculls.

Men

Athlete	Event	Heats		Repechage		Semifinals		Final	
Athlete	Event	Time	Rank	Time	Rank	Time	Rank	Time	Rank
Eric Verdonk	Single sculls	6:58.35	2 R	7:02.40	1 SA/B	6:56.79	3 FA	6:57.45	4
Scott Brownlee; Chris White; Pat Peoples; Campbell Clayton-Greene	Coxless four	6:03.10	2 SA/B	Bye		6:01.19	3 FA	6:02.13	6
Bill Coventry; Guy Melville; Toni Dunlop; Ian Wright; Carl Sheehan (cox)	Coxed four	6:32.61	5 R	6:25.32	4 FB	—N/a		6:15.66	11

Women

Athlete	Event	Heats		Repechage		Semifinals		Final	
Athlete	Event	Time	Rank	Time	Rank	Time	Rank	Time	Rank
Philippa Baker; Brenda Lawson	Double sculls	7:20.49	2 SA/B	Bye		7:01.07	2 FA	6:56.81	4

== Sailing ==
New Zealand had 17 competitors in Barcelona; 13 men and 4 women.

Athlete	Event	Race										Net points	Matchracing									Final rank
Athlete	Event	1	2	3	4	5	6	7	8	9	10	Net points	1	2	3	4	5	Wins	Rank	Semifinal	Final	Final rank
Jenny Armstrong	Women's Europe	17.0	10.0	3.0	14.0	~~26.0~~	18.0	3.0	—N/a			65.0	—N/a									4
Jon Bilger; Craig Greenwood (helm)	Men's 470	24.0	15.0	5.7	16.0	5.7	~~44.0~~	14.0	—N/a			80.4	—N/a									7
Russell Coutts (helm); Simon Daubney; Graham Fleury	Soling	17.0	15.0	~~18.0~~	3.0	18.0	11.7	—N/a				64.7	did not advance									8
Don Cowie; Rod Davis (helm)	Star	8.0	5.7	10.0	~~18.0~~	11.7	13.0	10.0	—N/a			58.4	—N/a									2nd place, silver medalist(s)
Leslie Egnot (helm); Jan Shearer	Women's 470	~~24.0~~	10.0	0.0	15.0	0.0	11.7	0.0	—N/a			36.7	—N/a									2nd place, silver medalist(s)
Brian Jones; Rex Sellers (helm)	Tornado	19.0	18.0	~~22.0~~	0.0	11.7	3.0	0.0	—N/a			51.7	—N/a									4
Murray Jones (helm); Greg Knowles	Flying Dutchman	~~25.0~~	25.0	18.0	3.0	18.0	13.0	0.0	—N/a			77.0	—N/a									4
Barbara Kendall	Women's Lechner A-390	0.0	~~16.0~~	5.7	3.0	0.0	3.0	11.7	13.0	5.7	5.7	47.8	—N/a									1st place, gold medalist(s)
Bruce Kendall	Men's Lechner A-390	18.0	24.0	~~51.0~~	5.7	16.0	0.0	0.0	19.0	20.0	3.0	107.7	—N/a									4
Craig Monk	Men's Finn	~~29.0~~	17.0	0.0	13.0	23.0	11.7	0.0	—N/a			64.7	—N/a									3rd place, bronze medalist(s)

== Shooting ==
Athlete	Event	Qualification rounds								Final round	Total	Rank
Athlete	Event	Round 1	Round 2	Round 3	Round 4	Round 5	Round 6	Total	Rank	Final round	Total	Rank
Jocelyn Lees	Women's 10 m air pistol	92	92	94	91	—N/a		369	=42	did not advance		=42
Stephen Petterson	Men's 50 m rifle prone	98	100	100	99	95	97	589	42	did not advance		42
Greg Yelavich	Men's 50 m pistol	89	92	91	84	92	95	543	=37	did not advance		=37
Greg Yelavich	Men's 10 m air pistol	97	94	96	96	95	97	575	=22	did not advance		=22

== Swimming ==
Athlete	Event	Heat		Final	
Athlete	Event	Result	Rank	Result	Rank
Trent Bray	Men's 200 m freestyle	1:52.49	26	did not advance	
Guy Callaghan	Men's 100 m butterfly	55.49	28	did not advance	
Guy Callaghan	Men's 200 m butterfly	2:02.12	27	did not advance	
Toni Jeffs	Women's 50 m freestyle	26.90	27	did not advance	
Toni Jeffs	Women's 100 m freestyle	58.80	29	did not advance	
Phillippa Langrell	Women's 400 m freestyle	4:14.00 NR	9 QB	4:12.96 NR	9
Phillippa Langrell	Women's 800 m freestyle	8:38.43 NR	5 Q	8:35.57 NR	4
Phillippa Langrell	Women's 400 m individual medley	4:53.62 NR	17	did not advance	
Danyon Loader	Men's 400 m freestyle	3:50.05 NR	5 Q	3:49.97 NR	8
Danyon Loader	Men's 200 m butterfly	1:58.15	2 Q	1:57.93	2nd place, silver medalist(s)
Simon Percy	Men's 100 m backstroke	57.96	33	did not advance	
Simon Percy	Men's 200 m backstroke	2:05.53	28	did not advance	
Simon Percy	Men's 200 m individual medley	2:06.76	28	did not advance	
Nicholas Sanders	Men's 50 m freestyle	23.79	34	did not advance	
Nicholas Sanders	Men's 100 m freestyle	51.77	36	did not advance	
Nicholas Sanders	Men's 100 m butterfly	55.44	25	did not advance	
Anna Simcic	Women's 100 m backstroke	1:03.12	11 QB	1:03.30	11
Anna Simcic	Women's 200 m backstroke	2:12.99	6 Q	2:11.99	5
John Steel	Men's 100 m freestyle	50.59	=14 QB	50.69	13
John Steel	Men's 200 m freestyle	1:50.56	18 QB	1:51.12	16
Richard Tapper	Men's 400 m freestyle	3:59.71	29	did not advance	
Mark Weldon	Men's 50 m freestyle	23.87	37	did not advance	
John Steel; Nicholas Sanders; Trent Bray; Mark Weldon	Men's 4 × 100 metre freestyle relay	3:23.09 NR	9	did not advance	
Trent Bray; Richard Tapper; John Steel; Danyon Loader	Men's 4 × 200 metre freestyle relay	7:26.36	11	did not advance	

== Table tennis ==
Athlete	Event	Pool stage						Round of 16	Quarterfinals	Semifinals	Final	Rank
Athlete	Event	Opposition Result	Opposition Result	Opposition Result	W	L	Rank	Opposition Result	Opposition Result	Opposition Result	Opposition Result	Rank
Hagen Bower	Men's singles	Gatien (FRA); L 0–2	Kalinić (IOP); L 0–2	Musa (NGR); L 0–2	0	3	4	did not advance				=49
Peter Jackson	Men's singles	Shibutani (JPN); L 0–2	Ding (AUT); L 0–2	Arado (CUB); W 2–0	1	2	3	did not advance				=33
Chunli Li	Women's singles	Hugh-Yip (USA); W 2–0	Amankwaa (GHA); W 2–0	Yu (PRK); L 0–2	2	1	2	did not advance				=17
Hagen Bower; Peter Jackson	Men's doubles	France; L 0–2	Poland; L 0–2	Nigeria; L 0–2	0	3	4	—N/a	did not advance			=25

== Wrestling ==
Athlete	Event	Round 1	Round 2	Round 3	Round 4	Round 5	Round 6	Final round	Rank
Athlete	Event	Opposition Result	Opposition Result	Opposition Result	Opposition Result	Opposition Result	Opposition Result	Opposition Result	Rank
Shane Stannett	Men's freestyle flyweight	Torkan (IRI); L 0–12	Toguzov (EUN); L 0–1	Eliminated					
Grant Parker	Men's freestyle light heavyweight	Ōta (JPN); L 0–3	Campbell (USA); L 0–15	Eliminated					

== Officials ==
- Chef de Mission – Ralph Roberts
- Assistant Chefs de Mission – Tony Popplewell, Merle Jonson
- Attaché – Gerardo Seeliger
- Administration officer – Jane Sheetz
- Transport officer – Chris Cooney
- Director of medical services – Richard Edmond
- Team doctors – Tony Edwards, Wayne Morris
- Chief physiotherapist – Duncan Reid
- Physiotherapists – Jane Bradshaw, Jane Jackson, Chris McCullough
- Chiropractor – Clive Hill
- Sports psychologist – Ken Hodge
- Bruce Towart – masseur
- Archery section manager and coach: Bruce Johnson
- Athletics
  - Section manager – Graeme McCabe
  - Coaches – Kerry Hill, Mene Mene, Allan Potts
- Badminton section manager and coach: Chris Bullen
- Boxing manager and coach: John McKay
- Canoeing
  - Slalom section manager and coach – Eric Horwood
  - Flatwater section manager – Graham Dobson
  - Flatwater coach – Mark Sutherland
- Cycling
  - Section manager – Gordon Sharrock
  - Track coach – Ron Cheatley
  - Assistant track coach – Paul Medhurst
  - Road coach – Garry Bell
  - Mechanics – Peter Goding, Jim Matthews
- Equestrian
  - Showjumping section manager – Stewart Tucker
  - Three-day eventing section manager – Denis Pain
  - Veterinarian – Wallie Niederer
  - Coach – Hans Pedersen
  - Groom for Blyth Tait – Delayne Cooke
  - Showjumping groom for Mark Todd – Debbie Cunningham
  - Groom for Vicky Latta – Jacqueline Fannin
  - Groom for Bruce Goodin – Susan Mountain
  - Three-day event groom for Mark Todd – Deborah Slinn
  - Groom for Andrew Nicholson – Selena White
- Fencing section manager and coach – Martin Brill
- Field hockey
  - Women's team
    - Section manager – Marianne Gray
    - Coach – Pat Barwick
    - Assistant coach – Ann McKenna
    - Trainer – Louise Johnson
  - Men's team
    - Section manager – Neil Edmundson
    - Coach – Kevin Towns
    - Assistant coach – Arthur Parkin
    - Trainer – Gavin Savage
- Judo
  - Section manager – Ray Roberts
  - Coach – Jim McPhee
- Rowing
  - Section manager – Ivan Sutherland
  - Coaches – Brian Hawthorne, Duncan Holland, Sam Le Compte
- Sailing
  - Chief coach and technical adviser – Tom Schnackenberg
  - Coaches – Grant Beck, Jock Bilger, Murray Philpott
  - Meteorologist – Bob McDavitt
- Shooting section manager – Graeme Smith
- Swimming
  - Section manager – Bert Cotterill
  - Swimming coaches – Duncan Laing, Brett Naylor
  - Diving coach – Cheng Yang
- Table tennis section manager and coach – Peter Hirst
- Wrestling section manager – Graeme Hawkins
