= Cycling at the 1992 Summer Olympics – Men's sprint =

Men's sprint at the Games of the XXV Olympiad
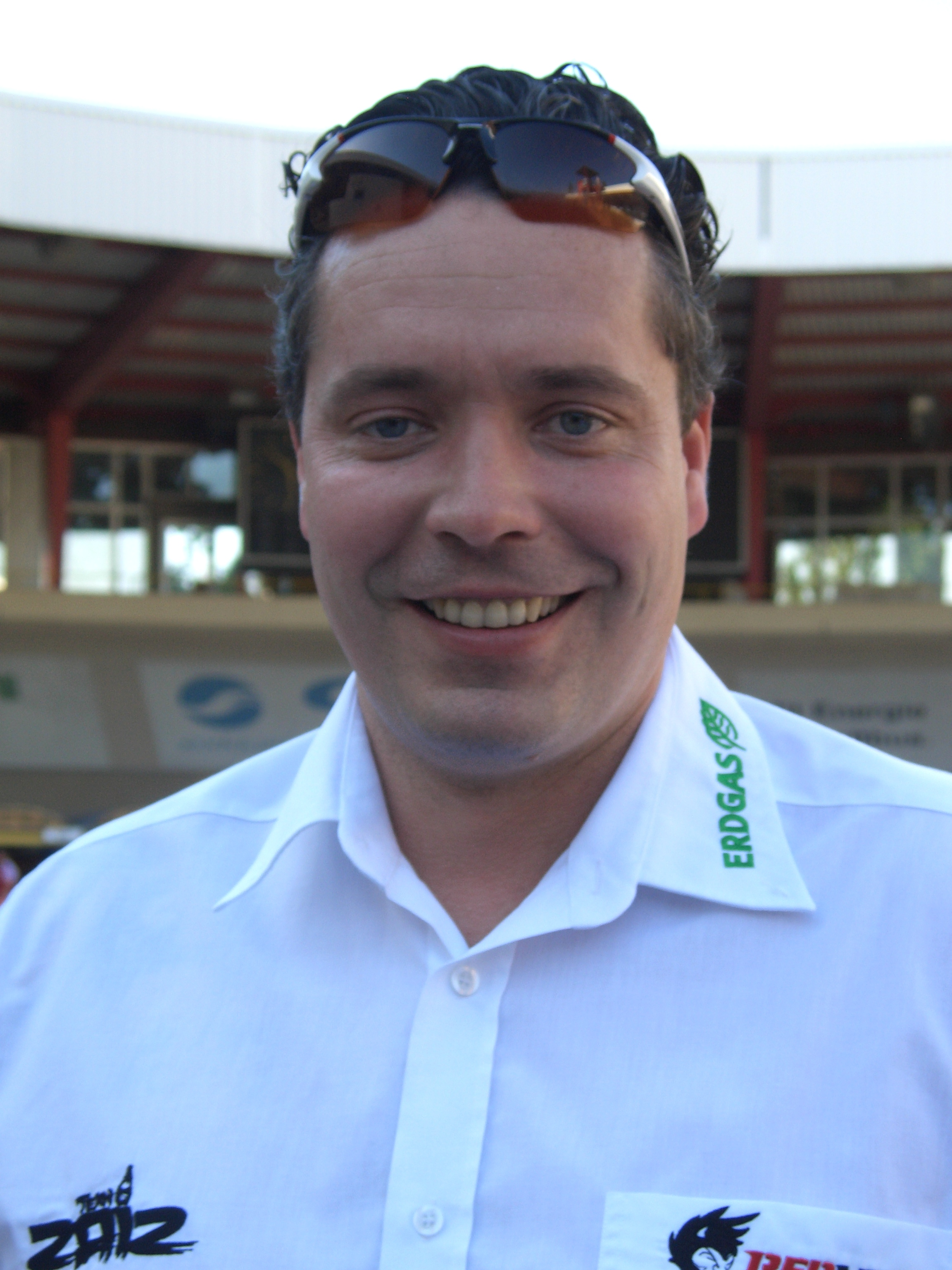
- Jens Fiedler (2010)
- Venue: Velòdrom d'Horta
- Dates: 28–31 July
- Competitors: 23 from 23 nations

Medalists
1st place, gold medalist(s)		Jens Fiedler; Germany
2nd place, silver medalist(s)		Gary Neiwand; Australia
3rd place, bronze medalist(s)		Curt Harnett; Canada

The men's sprint (track cycling) at the 1992 Summer Olympics (Cycling) was an event that consisted of cyclists making three laps around the track. Only the time for the last 200 metres of the 750 metres covered was counted as official time. The races were held on Tuesday, July 28, Wednesday, July 29, Thursday, July 30 and Friday, July 31, 1992, at the Velòdrom d'Horta. There were 23 competitors from 23 nations, with each nation limited to one cyclist. The event was won by Jens Fiedler of Germany, the first victory in the men's sprint for Germany as a unified nation since 1936 (though East Germany had won two gold medals since). Gary Neiwand of Australia took silver, the third time that nation had a runner-up in the event; Neiwand was only the fourth man to win multiple medals in the sprint (adding to his 1988 bronze). Canada earned its first medal in the men's sprint with Curt Harnett's bronze.

== Background ==
This was the 20th appearance of the event, which has been held at every Summer Olympics except 1904 and 1912. Four of the quarterfinalists from 1988 returned: silver medalist Nikolai Kovsh of the Soviet Union (now representing the Unified Team), bronze medalist Gary Neiwand of Australia, sixth-place finisher Erik Schoefs of Belgium, and eighth-place finisher Maxwell Cheeseman of Trinidad and Tobago. East Germany had been dominant through reunification of Germany; Bill Huck and Jens Fiedler had won the last three world championships, and the last time anyone not from East Germany had won was 1982. With only one cyclist per nation allowed, Fiedler was selected for the German team and was the heavy favorite.

Indonesia made its debut in the men's sprint; some former Soviet republics competed as the Unified Team. France made its 20th appearance, the only nation to have competed at every appearance of the event.

== Competition format ==
This sprint competition involved a series of head-to-head matches along with the new qualifying round of time trials. There were five main match rounds, with two repechages. The first repechage had two rounds.

- Qualifying round: Each of the 23 competitors completed a 200-metre flying time trial (reaching full speed before timing started for the last 200 metres). The top 24 advanced to the match rounds, seeded based on their time in the qualifying round. With only 23 riders starting, nobody was eliminated.
- Round 1: The 23 cyclists were seeded into 8 heats of 3 cyclists each, except that one heat had only 2 cyclists and a second was reduced to 2 by a withdrawal. The winner of each heat advanced to the 1/8 finals (8 cyclists) while the other cyclists went to the first repechage semifinals (14 cyclists).
- First repechage semifinals: The 14 cyclists were divided into 7 heats, each with 2 cyclists. The winner of each heat advanced to the first repechage finals (7 cyclists) while the losers were eliminated (7 cyclists).
- First repechage finals: The 7 cyclists were divided into 3 heats, two with 2 cyclists and one with 3 cyclists. The winners of each heat advanced to the 1/8 finals, along with the second-placed cyclist in the heat of 3 (4 cyclists). The last-place cyclist in each heat was eliminated (3 cyclists).
- 1/8 finals: The 12 remaining cyclists competed in a 1/8 finals round. There were 4 heats in this round, with 3 cyclists in each. The top cyclist in each heat advanced to the quarterfinals (4 cyclists), while the remaining two in each heat went to the second repechage (8 cyclists).
- Second repechage: This round featured 4 heats, with 2 cyclists each. The winner of each heat advanced to the quarterfinals (4 cyclists); the losers were eliminated (4 cyclists).
- Quarterfinals: Beginning with the quarterfinals, all matches were one-on-one competitions and were held in best-of-three format. There were 4 quarterfinals, with the winner of each advancing to the semifinals and the loser going to the fifth-eighth classification race.
- Semifinals: The two semifinals provided for advancement to the gold medal final for winners and to the bronze medal final for losers.
- Finals: Both a gold medal final and a bronze medal final were held, as well as a classification final for fifth through eighth places for quarterfinal losers.

== Records ==
The records for the sprint are 200 metre flying time trial records, kept for the qualifying round in later Games as well as for the finish of races.

World record	Vladimir Adamachvili (URS)	10.099	Moscow, Soviet Union	6 August 1990
Olympic record	Lutz Heßlich (GDR)	10.395	Seoul, South Korea	21 September 1988

Three men broke the Olympic record in the qualifying round, in sequence: Curt Harnett clocked in at 10.368 seconds, Gary Neiwand at 10.330 seconds, and Jens Fiedler at 10.252 seconds.

== Schedule ==
All times are Central European Summer Time (UTC+2)

Date	Time	Round
Tuesday, 28 July 1992	10:00; 19:05; 20:50; 21:15	Qualifying round Round 1 First repechage semifinals First repechage finals
Wednesday, 29 July 1992	18:20; 18:55; 20:00	1/8 finals Second repechage Quarterfinals
Thursday, 30 July 1992	21:10	Semifinals
Friday, 31 July 1992	18:40	Finals

== Results ==
=== Qualifying round ===
Held Tuesday, July 28.
Times and average speeds are listed.

Rank	Cyclist	Nation	Time 200 m	Speed km/h	Notes
1	Jens Fiedler	Germany	10.252	70.230	Q, OR
2	Gary Neiwand	Australia	10.330	69.699	Q
3	Curt Harnett	Canada	10.368	69.444	Q
4	Roberto Chiappa	Italy	10.516	68.467	Q
5	José Manuel Moreno	Spain	10.550	68.246	Q
6	Ken Carpenter	United States	10.561	68.175	Q
7	Frédéric Magné	France	10.617	67.815	Q
8	Ainārs Ķiksis	Latvia	10.749	66.982	Q
9	Erik Schoefs	Belgium	10.819	66.549	Q
10	Jaroslav Jeřábek	Czechoslovakia	10.873	66.219	Q
11	Keiji Kojima	Japan	10.902	66.042	Q
12	Rolf Furrer	Switzerland	10.935	65.843	Q
13	José Lovito	Argentina	11.024	65.312	Q
14	Nikolai Kovsh	Unified Team	11.030	65.276	Q
15	Jhon González	Colombia	11.097	64.882	Q
16	Jon Andrews	New Zealand	11.102	64.853	Q
17	Dirk Jan van Hameren	Netherlands	11.284	63.807	Q
18	Maxwell Cheeseman	Trinidad and Tobago	11.448	62.893	Q
19	Livingstone Alleyne	Barbados	11.559	62.289	Q
20	Andrew Myers	Jamaica	11.633	61.892	Q
21	Tulus Widodo Kalimanto	Indonesia	11.697	61.554	Q
22	Sean Bloch	South Africa	12.186	59.084	Q
23	Pedro Vaca	Bolivia	12.243	58.809	Q

=== Round 1 ===
Held Tuesday, July 28. The 1/16 round consisted of eight heats, seven of three riders and one of two riders. Winners advanced to the next round, losers competed in the repechage.

==== Heat 1 ====
Rank	Cyclist	Nation	Time 200 m	Speed km/h	Notes
1	Jens Fiedler	Germany	11.339	63.497	Q
2	Jon Andrews	New Zealand			R

==== Heat 2 ====
Rank	Cyclist	Nation	Time 200 m	Speed km/h	Notes
1	Gary Neiwand	Australia	11.319	63.609	Q
2	Jhon González	Colombia			R
3	Dirk Jan van Hameren	Netherlands			R

==== Heat 3 ====
Rank	Cyclist	Nation	Time 200 m	Speed km/h	Notes
1	Curt Harnett	Canada	11.248	64.011	Q
2	Nikolai Kovsh	Unified Team			R
3	Maxwell Cheeseman	Trinidad and Tobago			R

==== Heat 4 ====
Rank	Cyclist	Nation	Time 200 m	Speed km/h	Notes
1	José Lovito	Argentina	11.338	63.503	Q
2	Roberto Chiappa	Italy			R
3	Livingstone Alleyne	Barbados			R

==== Heat 5 ====
Rank	Cyclist	Nation	Time 200 m	Speed km/h	Notes
1	José Manuel Moreno	Spain	11.278	63.841	Q
2	Rolf Furrer	Switzerland			R
3	Andrew Myers	Jamaica			R

==== Heat 6 ====
Rank	Cyclist	Nation	Time 200 m	Speed km/h	Notes
1	Ken Carpenter	United States	10.981	65.567	Q
2	Keiji Kojima	Japan			R
3	Tulus Widodo Kalimanto	Indonesia			R

==== Heat 7 ====
Rank	Cyclist	Nation	Time 200 m	Speed km/h	Notes
1	Frédéric Magné	France	11.230	64.113	Q
2	Jaroslav Jeřábek	Czechoslovakia			R
3	Sean Bloch	South Africa			R

==== Heat 8 ====
Rank	Cyclist	Nation	Time 200 m	Speed km/h	Notes
1	Erik Schoefs	Belgium	11.505	62.581	Q
2	Ainārs Ķiksis	Latvia			R
—	Pedro Vaca	Bolivia	DNS		

=== First repechage semifinals ===
Held Tuesday, July 28. The fourteen defeated cyclists from the first round took part in the 1/16 repechage. They raced in seven heats of two riders each. The winner of each heat advance to repechage finals.

==== First repechage semifinal 1 ====
Rank	Cyclist	Nation	Time 200 m	Speed km/h	Notes
1	Jon Andrews	New Zealand	11.251	63.994	Q
2	Dirk Jan van Hameren	Netherlands			

==== First repechage semifinal 2 ====
Rank	Cyclist	Nation	Time 200 m	Speed km/h	Notes
1	Nikolai Kovsh	Unified Team	12.000	60.000	Q
2	Shinichi Ota	Japan			

==== First repechage semifinal 3 ====
Rank	Cyclist	Nation	Time 200 m	Speed km/h	Notes
1	Roberto Chiappa	Italy	11.106	64.829	Q
2	Maxwell Cheeseman	Trinidad and Tobago			

==== First repechage semifinal 4 ====
Rank	Cyclist	Nation	Time 200 m	Speed km/h	Notes
1	Rolf Furrer	Switzerland	11.700	61.538	Q
2	Tulus Widodo Kalimanto	Indonesia			

==== First repechage semifinal 5 ====
Rank	Cyclist	Nation	Time 200 m	Speed km/h	Notes
1	Keiji Kojima	Japan	11.212	64.216	Q
2	Andrew Myers	Jamaica			

==== First repechage semifinal 6 ====
Rank	Cyclist	Nation	Time 200 m	Speed km/h	Notes
1	Jaroslav Jeřábek	Czechoslovakia	11.532	62.434	Q
2	Jhon González	Colombia			

==== First repechage semifinal 7 ====
Rank	Cyclist	Nation	Time 200 m	Speed km/h	Notes
1	Ainārs Ķiksis	Latvia	11.327	63.564	Q
2	Sean Bloch	South Africa			

=== First repechage finals ===
Held Tuesday, July 28. The seven winning cyclists from the second round repechage took part in the final repechage. They raced in two heats of two riders and one heat of three riders. The winner of the first two heats and the top two from heat three advanced to the next round .

==== First repechage final 1 ====
Rank	Cyclist	Nation	Time 200 m	Speed km/h	Notes
1	Nikolai Kovsh	Unified Team	11.971	60.145	Q
2	Jaroslav Jeřábek	Czechoslovakia			

==== First repechage final 2 ====
Rank	Cyclist	Nation	Time 200 m	Speed km/h	Notes
1	Jon Andrews	New Zealand	11.701	61.533	Q
2	Rolf Furrer	Switzerland			

==== First repechage final 3 ====
Rank	Cyclist	Nation	Time 200 m	Speed km/h	Notes
1	Roberto Chiappa	Italy	11.264	63.920	Q
2	Ainārs Ķiksis	Latvia			Q
3	Keiji Kojima	Japan			

=== 1/8 finals ===
Held Wednesday, July 29. The 1/8 finals consisted of four heats of three riders each. The winners of each heat advance to the next round, with losers getting another chance in the third round repechage.

==== 1/8 final 1 ====
Rank	Cyclist	Nation	Time 200 m	Speed km/h	Notes
1	Jens Fiedler	Germany	11.285	63.801	Q
2	Ainārs Ķiksis	Latvia			R
3	Erik Schoefs	Belgium			R

==== 1/8 final 2 ====
Rank	Cyclist	Nation	Time 200 m	Speed km/h	Notes
1	Gary Neiwand	Australia	11.112	64.794	Q
2	Frédéric Magné	France			R
3	Roberto Chiappa	Italy			R

==== 1/8 final 3 ====
Rank	Cyclist	Nation	Time 200 m	Speed km/h	Notes
1	Curt Harnett	Canada	10.994	65.490	Q
2	Jon Andrews	New Zealand			R
—	Ken Carpenter	United States	DSQ		R

==== 1/8 final 4 ====
Rank	Cyclist	Nation	Time 200 m	Speed km/h	Notes
1	José Manuel Moreno	Spain	11.216	64.194	Q
2	Nikolai Kovsh	Unified Team			R
3	José Lovito	Argentina			R

=== Second repechage ===
Held Wednesday, July 29. The eight cyclists defeated in the third round competed in the third round repechage. Four heats of two riders were held. Winners rejoined the victors from the third round and advanced to the quarterfinals.

==== Second repechage heat 1 ====
Rank	Cyclist	Nation	Time 200 m	Speed km/h	Notes
1	José Lovito	Argentina	11.266	63.909	Q
2	Ainārs Ķiksis	Latvia			

==== Second repechage heat 2 ====
Rank	Cyclist	Nation	Time 200 m	Speed km/h	Notes
1	Ken Carpenter	United States	11.390	63.213	Q
2	Frédéric Magné	France			

==== Second repechage heat 3 ====
Rank	Cyclist	Nation	Time 200 m	Speed km/h	Notes
1	Roberto Chiappa	Italy	11.137	64.649	Q
2	Jon Andrews	New Zealand			

==== Second repechage heat 4 ====
Rank	Cyclist	Nation	Time 200 m	Speed km/h	Notes
1	Nikolai Kovsh	Unified Team	11.577	62.192	Q
2	Erik Schoefs	Belgium			

=== Quarterfinals ===
Held Wednesday, July 29. The eight riders that had advanced to the quarterfinals competed pairwise in four matches. Each match consisted of two races, with a potential third race being used as a tie-breaker if each cyclist won one of the first two races. All four quarterfinals matches were decided without a third race. Winners advanced to the semifinals, losers competed in a 5th to 8th place classification.

==== Quarterfinal 1 ====
Rank	Cyclist	Nation	Race 1	Race 2	Race 3	Notes
1	Jens Fiedler	Germany	10.883	11.322	—	Q
2	Ken Carpenter	United States			—	C

==== Quarterfinal 2 ====
Rank	Cyclist	Nation	Race 1	Race 2	Race 3	Notes
1	Gary Neiwand	Australia	11.375	11.576	—	Q
2	José Lovito	Argentina			—	C

==== Quarterfinal 3 ====
Rank	Cyclist	Nation	Race 1	Race 2	Race 3	Notes
1	Curt Harnett	Canada	11.183	11.161	—	Q
2	Nikolai Kovsh	Unified Team			—	C

==== Quarterfinal 4 ====
Rank	Cyclist	Nation	Race 1	Race 2	Race 3	Notes
1	Roberto Chiappa	Italy	11.134	11.325	—	Q
2	José Manuel Moreno	Spain			—	C

=== Semifinals ===
Held Thursday, July 30. The four riders that had advanced to the semifinals competed pairwise in two matches. Each match consisted of two races, with a potential third race being used as a tie-breaker if each cyclist won one of the first two races. Winners advanced to the finals, losers competed in the bronze medal match.

==== Semifinal 1 ====
Rank	Cyclist	Nation	Race 1	Race 2	Race 3	Notes
1	Jens Fiedler	Germany	10.791	11.279	—	Q
2	Roberto Chiappa	Italy			—	B

==== Semifinal 2 ====
Rank	Cyclist	Nation	Race 1	Race 2	Race 3	Notes
1	Gary Neiwand	Australia	10.912	11.293	—	Q
2	Curt Harnett	Canada			—	B

=== Finals ===
Held Friday, July 31.

==== Classification 5-8 ====
Held Friday, July 31. The 5-8 classification was a single race with all four riders that had lost in the quarterfinals taking place. The winner of the race received 5th place, with the others taking the three following places in order.

Rank	Cyclist	Nation	Time 200 m	Speed km/h
5	Ken Carpenter	United States	11.648	61.813
6	José Lovito	Spain		
7	Nikolai Kovsh	Unified Team		
8	José Manuel Moreno	Spain		

==== Bronze medal match ====
The bronze medal match was contested in a set of three races, with the winner of two races declared the winner.

Rank	Cyclist	Nation	Race 1	Race 2	Race 3
3rd place, bronze medalist(s)	Curt Harnett	Canada	10.930	11.102	—
4	Roberto Chiappa	Italy			—

==== Gold medal match ====
The gold medal match was contested in a set of three races, with the winner of two races declared the winner.

Rank	Cyclist	Nation	Race 1	Race 2	Race 3
1st place, gold medalist(s)	Jens Fiedler	Germany	10.778	10.778	—
2nd place, silver medalist(s)	Gary Neiwand	Australia			—

== Final classification ==
Rank	Cyclist	Nation
1	Jens Fiedler	Germany
2	Gary Neiwand	Australia
3	Curt Harnett	Canada
4	Roberto Chiappa	Italy
5	Ken Carpenter	United States
6	José Lovito	Argentina
7	Nikolai Kovsh	Unified Team
8	José Manuel Moreno	Spain
