= Richard Boyle (canoeist) =

New Zealand canoeist (born 1961)

Personal information
- Born: Richard Hugh Boyle; 27 May 1961 (age 65) Christchurch, New Zealand
- Height: 1.80 m (5 ft 11 in)
- Weight: 79 kg (174 lb)

Sport
- Country: New Zealand
- Sport: Surf lifesaving; Canoe sprint
- Club: North Beach SLSC; Taylors Mistake SLSC; Arawa Canoe Club; North Shore Canoe Club

Achievements and titles
- National finals: Taplin relay champion (1985)

Richard Hugh Boyle (born 27 May 1961) is a New Zealand sprint canoeist. Originally competing in surf lifesaving, he switched to canoe sprint in 1987, and competed at the 1991 ICF Canoe Sprint World Championships and the K-4 1000 metres event at the 1992 Summer Olympics.

== Early life ==
Boyle was born in Christchurch on 27 May 1961.

== Sporting career ==
=== Surf lifesaving ===
Boyle first came to attention in February 1979 when, competing for the North Beach Surf Life Saving Club (SLSC), he won the junior ski title at the South Island surf lifesaving championships held at Warrington. Two weeks later he won the same event at the Canterbury championships at Taylors Mistake, and was described as having "sound judgment of a wave".

By the 1980–1981 season, Boyle had graduated to North Beach's senior ranks, before moving to the Taylors Mistake SLSC before the 1982–1983 season. At the 1985 national championships held at New Brighton, Boyle was part of the Taylor Mistake team that won the Taplin relay title, extending his team's lead on the final ski leg.

In November 1985, Boyle was named in the Canterbury surf lifesaving team that competed in Victoria early the following year, and in February 1986, he won four titles at the South Island surf lifesaving championships at North New Brighton, in the surf ski, double surf ski, surf ski rescue and surf ski relay. In July 1986, Boyle was one of ten ski surf trialists—including Olympic canoeists Ian Ferguson, Alan Thompson, Grant Bramwell and Paul MacDonald—named by the New Zealand selectors for the national team to compete against Australia the following season.

=== Canoe sprint ===
Over a number of winters, Boyle had used canoeing to keep fit for the summer surf ski season. In May 1987, he began serious training in the sport in an effort to gain selection to the New Zealand squad for the 1988 Olympic Games. He spent two weeks training with Grant Bramwell and Alan Thompson, being coached by Ben Hutchings—a coach of the New Zealand canoeing team at the 1984 Olympics—in Gisborne during the following Christmas–New Year period, and also received advice from Christchurch-based canoeist Geoff Walker who represented New Zealand at the Olympics in 1980. Boyle ultimately missed selection for the 1988 New Zealand Olympic team.

At the 1989 South Island canoe sprint championships raced on the Avon River in Christchurch, Boyle won three titles—in the K-1 500 metres, K-1 1000 metres and K-2 500 metres—and was runner-up in the K-2 1000 metres. At the national championships on Lake Pupuke the following week, Boyle represented the Arawa Canoe Club and reached the final of the K-1 500 metres, but was unplaced.

In early 1990, Boyle competed in the trials for the New Zealand canoe sprint team on Hamilton Lake, placing third in the K-1 500 metres final and second in the K-1 1000 metres petite final. He realised that he needed to give up full-time employment to compete at the highest level, and in July 1990 he moved to Auckland, where he joined the North Shore Canoe Club and trained full-time with the leading New Zealand canoeists. Over the following eight months, he improved his time over 500 metres by 2–3 seconds, and at the New Zealand championships on Lake Pupuke in March 1991 he was runner-up with Stephen Richards in the K-2 1000 metres, 0.2 seconds behind Ian Ferguson and Paul MacDonald. At the conclusion of the national championships, Boyle was selected for the New Zealand team to compete in Europe later that year, including at the 1991 ICF Canoe Sprint World Championships.

At the 1991 world championships in Paris, Boyle teamed up with Finn O'Connor in the K-2 1000 metres. The pair were third in their heat and progressed directly to the semifinal, but did not make the final. Boyle competed in the K-4 1000 metres alongside Brent Clode, Mark Scheib and Stephen Richards, also reaching the semifinals. In the final of the K-2 10,000 metres, Boyle and Finn O'Connor placed 13th of the 22 teams that completed the event.

Following trials for the New Zealand Olympic team in January and the national championships in March 1992, Boyle was named in the New Zealand canoeing team to compete at the 1992 Olympic Games in Barcelona. He competed in the K-4 1000 metres with Finn O'Connor, Stephen Richards, and Mark Scheib; they finished sixth in their heat, recording a time of 3:03.58, and were eliminated after placing eighth (3:00.66) in their semifinal. He became New Zealand Olympian number 598.

Boyle was third in the K-1 500 metres final at the 1993 New Zealand national championships in January 1993, but was not included in the national canoeing squad that was subsequently named by national coach Alan Thompson.
