= Montag =

Montag is German for Monday. Notable people with the surname include:

- Carol Montag, American folk singer-songwriter
- Heidi Montag (born 1986), American actress
- Holly Montag (born 1983), American television personality
- Jan-Marco Montag (born 1983), German field hockey player
- Jemima Montag (born 1998), Australian racewalker
- Jerzy Montag (born 1947), German politician
- Montag (musician) (born c. 1978), stage name of Canadian electronic musician Antoine Bédard
- Shirley Montag Almon (1935–1975), American economist
- Sven Montag, German sprint canoer
- Warren Montag (born 1952), American academic
- Wolf-Dieter Montag (1924–2018), German physician and international sports administrator

== Fictional characters ==
- Fräulein Montag, character in Franz Kafka's novel The Trial
- Guy Montag, central character in Ray Bradbury's 1953 novel Fahrenheit 451

== Other ==
- Guy Montag Doe v. San Francisco Housing Authority, lawsuit by the National Rifle Association
- Montag aus Licht, opera from Karlheiz Stockhausen's cycle Licht
- Montag Hall (Georgia Tech) (Harold E. Montag Hall), residence hall at the Georgia Institute of Technology
