= Mazheika =

Mazheika, Mazheyka, Mozheyko, Mozheiko are transliterations of the Russianized Lithuanian-language surname Mažeika. The Polish-language form is Możejko. Notable people with this surname include:

- Igor Vsevolodovich Mozheiko, birth name of Kir Bulychev, Russian science fiction writer
- Pavel Mozheiko, Soviet military commander, Hero of the Soviet Union
- Vladimir Mozheyko, Soviet sprint canoer who competed in the early 1990s
- Zinaida Mozheiko (1933-2014), Belarusian ethnomusicologist and cinematographer
