= Alberto Sánchez =

Alberto Sánchez may refer to:

- Alberto Sánchez (canoeist) (born 1969), Spanish sprint canoer
- Alberto Sánchez (hammer thrower) (born 1973), Cuban hammer thrower
- Alberto Ruy Sánchez (born 1951), Mexican writer and editor
