= Nikolay Georgiev =

Nikolay Georgiev may refer to:

- Nikolay Georgiev (canoeist) (born 1960), Bulgarian sprint canoer
- Nikolay Georgiev (footballer) (born 1998), Bulgarian footballer
