= Traicho =

Traicho (Bulgarian: Трайчо) is a Bulgarian masculine given name. Notable people with the name include:

- Traicho Draganov, Bulgarian sprint canoer
- Traicho Kostov (1897–1949), Bulgarian politician
