= Michael Matus =

Michael Matus may refer to:

- Michael Matus (canoeist), Czechoslovak sprint canoeist
- Michael Matus (actor), British actor
