= Byung-hoon =

- Hangul: 병훈
- RR: Byeonghun
- MR: Pyŏnghun

Byung-hoon, also spelled Byeong-hun, is a Korean given name.

People with this name include:

- An Byeong-hun (born 1991), South Korean golfer
- Kim Byung-Hoon (born 1982), South Korean field hockey player
- On Byung-Hoon (born 1985), South Korean football player
- Park Byeong-Hun (born 1973), South Korean sprint canoer
- Yoo Byung-hoon (born 1972), South Korean Paralympian athlete

Fictional characters with this name include:

- Lee/Seo Byung-hoon, in 2010 South Korean film Cyrano Agency and its spin-off 2013 television series Dating Agency: Cyrano

== See also ==
- List of Korean given names
