= Andrew Myers =

Andrew Myers may refer to:

- Andy Myers (born 1973), English footballer
- Andrew Myers (cyclist) (born 1968), Jamaican cyclist
- Andrew Myers (racing driver) (born 1980), American racing driver
- Andrew Myers (politician), Minnesota politician
