= Canoeing at the 1987 Pan American Games – Men's K-1 500 metres =

Men's K-1 500 metres at the 1987 Pan American Games
- Venue: Eagle Creek Park
- Dates: 9 August
- Competitors: 7 from 7 nations
- Winning time: 1.49.00

Medalists
Gold medal	Norman Bellingham	United States
Silver medal	Luis Pérez	Cuba
Bronze medal	Jeff Houser	Canada

The men's K-1 500 metres canoeing event at the 1987 Pan American Games was held at the Eagle Creek Park in Indianapolis.

== Results ==
=== Final ===
Rank	Athletes	Country	Time	Notes
1st place, gold medalist(s)	Norman Bellingham	United States	1.49.00	
2nd place, silver medalist(s)	Luis Pérez	Cuba	1.54.06	
3rd place, bronze medalist(s)	Jeff Houser	Canada	1.58.45	
4	Juan Labrin	Argentina	2.02.29	
5	Juan Ortiz	Mexico	2.05.77	
6	Victor Ayzaguer	Uruguay	2.10.21	
7	Thomas Ossenbach	Costa Rica	2.55.08	
