= Dejon =

Dejon or DeJon is a masculine given name, a variant of ancient Greek Deion, meaning 'God is gracious'. It is often found among African Americans. Notable people with the given name include:

- Dejon Allen (born 1994), American football player
- Dejon Brissett (born 1996), Canadian football player
- DeJon Gomes (born 1989), American football player
- DeJon Jarreau (born 1998), American basketball player
- Dejon Noel-Williams (born 1998), English footballer
- Dejon Slavov, Bulgarian sprint canoeist
