= Silke Bull =

German canoeist

Medal record

Women's canoe sprint

World Championships
Gold medal – first place	1990 Poznań	K-4 500 m

Silke Bull is an East German sprint canoer who competed in the early 1990s. She won a gold medal in the K-4 500 m event at the 1990 ICF Canoe Sprint World Championships in Poznań.
