= Catrin Fischer =

German canoeist

Medal record

Women's canoe sprint

World Championships
| Bronze medal – third place | 1990 Poznań | K-4 500 m |

Catrin Fischer is a West German sprint canoer who competed in the early 1990s. She won a bronze medal in the K-4 500 m event at the 1990 ICF Canoe Sprint World Championships in Poznań.
