= Park Cha-keun =

South Korean canoeist

Personal information
- Born: July 18, 1966 (age 60)
- Height: 170 cm (5 ft 7 in)
- Weight: 65 kg (143 lb)
Medal record
Men's canoe sprint
Representing South Korea
Asian Games
| Gold medal – first place | 1990 Beijing | K-2 500 m |
| Gold medal – first place | 1990 Beijing | K-2 1000 m |

Park Cha-Keun (박차근, born July 18, 1966) is a South Korean sprint canoer who competed in the late 1980s. At the 1988 Summer Olympics in Seoul, he was eliminated in the repechages of the K-2 1000 m event.
