= Vyacheslav Kutuzin =

Soviet sprint canoer

Vyacheslav Kutuzin (Russian: Вячеслав Кутузин; born July 12, 1973) is a Soviet sprint canoer who competed for the Unified Team at the 1992 Summer Olympics in Barcelona. He was eliminated in the semifinals of the K-4 1000 m event.
