= Sergey Galkov =

Soviet and Russian sprint canoeist (1965–2026)

Medal record

Men's canoe sprint

World Championships
Bronze medal – third place	1991 Paris	K-4 500 m
Bronze medal – third place	1993 Copenhagen	K-4 10000 m

Sergey Vitalievich Galkov (Russian: Сергей Витальевич Галков; 9 May 1965 – 10 January 2026) was a Soviet and Russian sprint canoeist who competed from the late 1980s to the mid-1990s. He won two bronze medals at the ICF Canoe Sprint World Championships, earning them in 1991 (K-4 500 m for the Soviet Union) and 1993 (K-4 10000 m for Russia).

== Biography ==
Galkov was born in Moscow on 9 May 1965. He also competed in the K-2 1000 m event for the Soviets at the 1988 Summer Olympics in Seoul, but was eliminated in the semifinals.

Galkov died on 10 January 2026, at the age of 60.

== Sources ==
- Sports-reference.com profile
