= Eduardo Gomes (canoeist) =

Portuguese canoeist (born 1965)

Eduardo Gomes (born 31 December 1965) is a Portuguese sprint canoeist who competed in the late 1980s. At the 1988 Summer Olympics in Seoul, he was eliminated in the repechages of the K-2 1000 m event.
