= Tibor Helyi =

Hungarian canoeist (born 1963)

Medal record

Men's canoe sprint

Representing Hungary

Canoe Sprint World Championships
Gold medal – first place	1985 Mechelen	K-4 10000 m
Silver medal – second place	1987 Duisburg	K-4 10000 m
Bronze medal – third place	1982 Belgrade	K-4 10000 m
Bronze medal – third place	1986 Montreal	K-4 10000 m

Tibor Helyi (born 19 April 1963) is a Hungarian sprint canoer who competed from the 1980s. He won four medals in the K-4 10000 m event at the ICF Canoe Sprint World Championships with a gold (1985), a silver (1987) and two bronzes (1982, 1986).

Helyi also finished ninth in the K-2 1000 m event at the 1988 Summer Olympics in Seoul.
