= Niels Ellwanger =

West German sprint canoer (born 1965)

Personal information
- Born: 5 December 1965 (age 60) Hamburg, West Germany

Sport
- Sport: Canoe sprint
Medal record
Representing West Germany
Summer Universiade
Gold medal – first place	1987 Zagreb	K-2 1000 m
Silver medal – second place	1987 Zagreb	K-2 500 m

Niels Ellwanger (born 5 December 1965) is a West German sprint canoer who competed in the late 1980s. At the 1988 Summer Olympics in Seoul, he finished fourth in the K-2 1000 m event.
