= Canoeing at the 1992 Summer Olympics – Men's K-4 1000 metres =

The men's K-4 1000 metres event was a fours kayaking event conducted as part of the Canoeing at the 1992 Summer Olympics program. The official report did not make clear on the two semifinals and final which events were the men's K-2 1000 m event and the men's K-4 1000 m event and would thus create confusion to the average reader.

== Medalists ==
Gold	Silver	Bronze
Germany; Mario von Appen; Oliver Kegel; Thomas Reineck; André Wohllebe	Hungary; Ferenc Csipes; Zsolt Gyulay; Attila Ábrahám; László Fidel	Australia; Ramon Andersson; Kelvin Graham; Ian Rowling; Steven Wood

== Results ==
=== Heats ===
18 crews entered in three heats. These heats were used to seed the two semifinal events.

Heat 1
1.	Ferenc Csipes, Zsolt Gyulay, Attila Ábrahám, and László Fidel (HUN)	2:54.06
2.	Maciej Freimut, Grzegorz Kaleta, Grzegorz Krawców, and Wojciech Kurpiewski (POL)	2:55.28
3.	Róbert Erban, Juraj Kadnár, Attila Szabó, and Jozef Turza (TCH)	2:56.02
4.	Jonas Fager, Pablo Grate, Anders Ohlsén, and Hans Olsson (SWE)	2:56.22
5.	Belmiro Pentera, António Brinco, Rui Fernandes, and António Monteiro (POR)	3:02.38
6.	Juan Labrin, Cristian Maino, José Luis Marello, and Fernando Chaparro (ARG)	3:09.28
7.	Ju Jong-Gwan, Gang Gi-Jin, Lee Yong-Cheol, and Park Byeong-Hun (KOR)	3:12.51
Heat 2
1.	Kelvin Graham, Ian Rowling, Steven Wood, and Ramon Andersson (AUS)	2:57.06
2.	Vladimir Bobreshov, Oleg Gorobiy, Vyacheslav Kutuzin, and Sergey Kirsanov (EUN)	2:57.67
3.	Gregorio Vincente, Alberto Sánchez, Miguel Garcia, and Francisco Cabezas (ESP)	2:58.67
4.	Matteo Bruscoli, Enrico Lupetti, Paolo Tommasini, and Iduno Santoni (ITA)	2:59.15
5.	Pierre Lubac, Jean-François Briand, Sebastien Mayer, and Patrick Lancerreau (FRA)	3:02.60
6.	Richard Boyle, Finn O'Connor, Stephen Richards, and Mark Scheib (NZL)	3:03.58
Heat 3
1.	Mario von Appen, Oliver Kegel, Thomas Reineck, and André Wohllebe (GER)	2:52.17
2.	Geza Magyar, Sorin Petcu, Romică Șerban, and Daniel Stoian (ROU)	2:54.34
3.	Petar Godev, Nikolay Georgiev, Milko Kazakov, and Nikolay Yordanov (BUL)	2:57.30
4.	Chris Barlow, Mark Hamilton, Mike Herbert, and Terry Kent (USA)	2:58.57
5.	Mark Perrow, Hermann Kotze, Bennie Reynders, and Oscar Chalupsky (RSA)	3:06.36

=== Semifinals ===
The top four finishers in the each semifinal and the fastest fifth-place finisher advanced to the final.

Semifinal 1
1.	Mario von Appen, Oliver Kegel, Thomas Reineck, and André Wohllebe (GER)	2:54.80	QF
2.	Ferenc Csipes, Zsolt Gyulay, Attila Ábrahám, and László Fidel (HUN)	2:55.39	QF
3.	Chris Barlow, Mark Hamilton, Mike Herbert, and Terry Kent (USA)	2:56.57	QF
4.	Róbert Erban, Juraj Kadnár, Attila Szabó, and Jozef Turza (TCH)	2:56.62	QF
5.	Petar Godev, Nikolay Georgiev, Milko Kazakov, and Nikolay Yordanov (BUL)	2:57.42	QF
6.	Pierre Lubac, Jean-François Briand, Sebastien Mayer, and Patrick Lancerreau (FRA)	2:58.98
7.	Vladimir Bobreshov, Oleg Gorobiy, Vyacheslav Kutuzin, and Sergey Kirsanov (EUN)	2:59.35
8.	Richard Boyle, Finn O'Connor, Stephen Richards, and Mark Scheib (NZL)	3:00.66
9.	Juan Labrin, Cristian Maino, José Luis Marello, and Fernando Chaparro (ARG)	3:11.44
Semifinal 2
1.	Geza Magyar, Sorin Petcu, Romică Șerban, and Daniel Stoian (ROU)	2:56.80	QF
2.	Jonas Fager, Pablo Grate, Anders Ohlsén, and Hans Olsson (SWE)	2:58.27	QF
3.	Kelvin Graham, Ian Rowling, Steven Wood, and Ramon Andersson (AUS)	2:58.83	QF
4.	Maciej Freimut, Grzegorz Kaleta, Grzegorz Krawców, and Wojciech Kurpiewski (POL)	2:59.20	QF
5.	Gregorio Vincente, Alberto Sánchez, Miguel Garcia, and Francisco Cabezas (ESP)	3:00.17
6.	Matteo Bruscoli, Enrico Lupetti, Paolo Tommasini, and Iduno Santoni (ITA)	3:00.48
7.	Belmiro Pentera, António Brinco, Rui Fernandes, and António Monteiro (POR)	3:00.90
8.	Mark Perrow, Hermann Kotze, Bennie Reynders, and Oscar Chalupsky (RSA)	3:10.82
-	Ju Jong-Gwan, Gang Gi-Jin, Lee Yong-Cheol, and Park Byeong-Hun (KOR)	Did not start

=== Final ===
The final was held on August 8.

Gold	Mario von Appen, Oliver Kegel, Thomas Reineck, and André Wohllebe (GER)	2:54.18
Silver	Ferenc Csipes, Zsolt Gyulay, Attila Ábrahám, and László Fidel (HUN)	2:54.82
Bronze	Kelvin Graham, Ian Rowling, Steven Wood, and Ramon Andersson (AUS)	2:56.97
4.	Róbert Erban, Juraj Kadnár, Attila Szabó, and Jozef Turza (TCH)	2:57.06
5.	Geza Magyar, Sorin Petcu, Romică Șerban, and Daniel Stoian (ROU)	3:00.11
6.	Maciej Freimut, Grzegorz Kaleta, Grzegorz Krawców, and Wojciech Kurpiewski (POL)	3:01.43
7.	Jonas Fager, Pablo Grate, Anders Ohlsén, and Hans Olsson (SWE)	3:01.46
8.	Petar Godev, Nikolay Georgiev, Milko Kazakov, and Nikolay Yordanov (BUL)	3:02.08
9.	Chris Barlow, Mark Hamilton, Mike Herbert, and Terry Kent (USA)	3:04.30

Germany upset Hungary, the defending Olympic champions and winner of every world championship in the event since 1986, despite losing a key member, Detlef Hofmann, to doping for testosterone two months prior to the 1992 games (Hoffmann would win gold in this event four years later in Atlanta.).
