= Ramon Andersson =

Australian sprint and marathon canoeist

Personal information
- Full name: Ramon Dean Andersson
- Born: 20 March 1963 (age 63) Middle Swan, Western Australia
Medal record
Representing Australia
Men's canoe sprint
Olympic Games
| Bronze medal – third place | 1992 Barcelona | K-4 1000 m |
World Championships
| Silver medal – second place | 1991 Paris | K-4 10000 m |
Men's canoe marathon
World Championships
| Gold medal – first place | 1992 Brisbane | K-2 |

Ramon Dean Andersson (born 20 March 1963) is an Australian sprint and marathon canoeist who competed in the 1990s. Competing in two Summer Olympics, he won a bronze medal in the K-4 1000 m event at Barcelona in 1992.

== Career ==
Andersson also won a silver medal in the K-4 10000 m event at the 1991 ICF Canoe Sprint World Championships in Paris. He was an Australian Institute of Sport sprint canoeing scholarship holder in 1989–1993 and 1995.

On 29 September 2000, he was awarded the Australian Sports Medal for his canoeing achievements.
