= Axel Berndt =

German sprint canoer

Medal record

Men's canoe sprint

World Championships
Bronze medal – third place	1991 Paris	C-4 500 m

Axel Berndt is a German sprint canoer who competed in the early 1990s. He won a bronze medal in the C-4 500 m event at the 1991 ICF Canoe Sprint World Championships in Paris.
