= Anisi =

Indonesian sprint canoe racer (born 1969)

Personal information
- Born: June 9, 1969 (age 57)
- Height: 169 cm (5 ft 7 in)
- Weight: 67 kg (148 lb)
Medal record
Men's canoe sprint
Representing Indonesia
Asian Games
Silver medal – second place	1990 Beijing	K-1 1000 m
Bronze medal – third place	1990 Beijing	K-2 1000 m
Southeast Asian Games
Gold medal – first place	1997 Jakarta	K-1 500 m

Anisi (born June 9, 1969) is an Indonesian sprint canoe racer who competed in the early 1990s. At the 1992 Summer Olympics in Barcelona, he was eliminated in the repechages of both the K-1 500 m and the K-1 1000 m events.
