= Sorin Petcu =

Romanian canoeist

Medal record

Men's canoe sprint

World Championships
Silver medal – second place	1994 Mexico City	K-4 200 m
Silver medal – second place	1994 Mexico City	K-4 500 m
Bronze medal – third place	1999 Milan	K-4 1000 m

Sorin Petcu (born April 1, 1974) is a Romanian sprint canoer who competed in the 1990s. He won three medals at the ICF Canoe Sprint World Championships with two silvers (K-4 200 m and K-4 500 m: both 1994) and a bronze (K-4 1000 m: 1999).

Petcu also competed in two Summer Olympics, earning his best finish of fifth in the K-4 1000 m event at Barcelona in 1992.
