= Canoeing at the 1990 Asian Games =

- Venue: Haizi Reservoir Aquatic Sports Centre
- Dates: 2–5 October 1990

Canoeing and Kayaking were held at the 1990 Asian Games in Beijing, China from October 2 to October 5. Men's and women's competition were held in Kayak and men's competition in Canoe. The competition included only flatwater events.

== Medalists ==
=== Men ===
| Event | Gold | Silver | Bronze |
|---|---|---|---|
| C-1 500 m | Liang Zhisheng; China | Kiyoto Inoue; Japan | Park Chang-kyu; South Korea |
| C-1 1000 m | Guo Daen; China | Katsuya Toyama; Japan | O Yong-ryong; North Korea |
| C-2 500 m | China; Jiang Wenbiao; Wang Boqing | North Korea; Ri Jong-nam; Chu Myong-sop | Japan; Shusei Fukuzato; Hiroyuki Izumi |
| C-2 1000 m | China; Kuang Rizhong; Wang Xinqiang | Japan; Tsunehisa Uchino; Kazuaki Nishikawa | North Korea; Ri Jong-nam; Chu Myong-sop |
| K-1 500 m | Ma Fuliang; China | Lee Yong-chul; South Korea | Ri Ho-yong; North Korea |
| K-1 1000 m | Chun In-shik; South Korea | Anisi; Indonesia | Ma Fuliang; China |
| K-2 500 m | South Korea; Chun In-shik; Park Cha-keun | Japan; Koya Sato; Fumihiro Kimura | China; Xue Bing; Feng Xiaofeng |
| K-2 1000 m | South Korea; Chun In-shik; Park Cha-keun | China; Liu Xingchao; Lin Yuehua | Indonesia; Abdul Razak; Anisi |
| K-4 500 m | China; Liu Xingchao; Lin Yuehua; Hu Bin; Tang Xin | Japan; Naoya Matsushiro; Koya Sato; Nobuyuki Saito; Fumihiro Kimura | South Korea; Kim Dong-soo; Park Ki-jung; Jung Jong-hwan; Kim Byung-chun |
| K-4 1000 m | China; Xue Bing; Li Yanxin; Feng Xiaofeng; Huang Weiguo | South Korea; Kim Dong-soo; Park Ki-jung; Jung Jong-hwan; Kim Byung-chun | North Korea; Kang In-sun; Ri Song-chol; Ryong Sang-hyok; Ri Chang-sop |

=== Women ===
| Event | Gold | Silver | Bronze |
|---|---|---|---|
| K-1 500 m | Xu Zhijuan; China | Paek In-bok; North Korea | Yoon Mi-jung; South Korea |
| K-2 500 m | China; Sun Yuhong; Zhou Ronghua | Japan; Miyuki Kobayashi; Kumi Arai | North Korea; Kim Suk-yong; Ri Myong-bok |
| K-4 500 m | China; Wen Yanfang; Ning Menghua; Dong Ying; Du Hong | North Korea; Kim Suk-yong; Yang Suk-yong; Ri Myong-bok; Kim Gyong-suk | Japan; Miyuki Kobayashi; Kumi Arai; Chieko Akagi; Natsumi Mochizuki |

== Medal table ==
| Rank | Nation | Gold | Silver | Bronze | Total |
|---|---|---|---|---|---|
| 1 | China (CHN) | 10 | 1 | 2 | 13 |
| 2 | South Korea (KOR) | 3 | 2 | 3 | 8 |
| 3 | Japan (JPN) | 0 | 6 | 2 | 8 |
| 4 | North Korea (PRK) | 0 | 3 | 5 | 8 |
| 5 | Indonesia (INA) | 0 | 1 | 1 | 2 |
| Totals (5 entries) | | 13 | 13 | 13 | 39 |
