= Mark Hamilton (canoeist) =

American canoeist (born 1958)

Mark Hamilton (born February 6, 1958) is an American sprint canoer who competed in the early to mid-1990s. Competing in two Summer Olympics, he earned his best finish of ninth in the K-4 1000 m event at Barcelona in 1992.
