= Guido Behling =

German canoeist

Medal record

Men's canoe sprint

World Championships
Silver medal – second place	1985 Mechelen	K-2 500 m
Silver medal – second place	1986 Montreal	K-4 1000 m
Bronze medal – third place	1989 Plovdiv	K-4 1000 m

Guido Behling (born 20 January 1964 in Wittenberge/Prignitz) is an East German sprint canoer who competed in the mid to late 1980s. He won three medals at the ICF Canoe Sprint World Championships with two silvers (K-2 500 m: 1985, K-4 1000 m: 1986) and a bronze (K-4 1000 m: 1989).

Behling also finished fifth in the K-2 1000 m event at the 1988 Summer Olympics in Seoul.
