= Peter Foster (canoeist) =

Australian sprint canoeist

Olympic medal record

Men's canoe sprint
| Bronze medal – third place | 1988 Seoul | K-2 1000 m |

Peter Foster (born 27 July 1960) is an Australian sprint canoeist who competed in the late 1980s. He won the bronze medal in the K-2 1000 m event at the 1988 Summer Olympics in Seoul.

His mother Elizabeth and father John also had two other children. Catherine and Margot Foster.

Foster was the second child and grew up in Melbourne, Australia where he still resides.

Foster first became enthusiastic about canoeing while a member at the Anglesea Surf Life Saving Club at approximately the age of 14. Foster now armed with a passion for competing later moved on to compete for the Torquay Surf Life Saving Club.

Foster's father John competed for Australia in water polo at the 1952 and 1956 Summer Olympics. His sister Margot won a bronze in the women's coxed four event at the 1984 Summer Olympics in Los Angeles.

Foster is now a successful stockbroker working in Melbourne. Recently involved in 2007, 2008 as the director of junior competition and directing Victoria's (Australia) biggest youth Surf Life Saving program, with over 500 participants.

He is married and has three children.

He has later been involved with the Olympics team being involved with the Australia Olympic selection committee for canoeing on various occasions.

He regularly paddles surf skis at South Melbourne and on the Yarra river, in Victoria.
