= Katarin Koniovskala =

Soviet canoeist

Personal information
- Born: 25 December 1966 (age 59) Moscow, Soviet Union

Sport
- Sport: Canoe sprint
Medal record
Representing Soviet Union
World Championships
Bronze medal – third place	1990 Poznań	K-2 5000 m
Summer Universiade
Silver medal – second place	1987 Zagreb	K-4 500 m

Katarin Koniovskala (born 25 December 1966) is a Soviet sprint canoer who competed in the early 1990s. She won a bronze medal in the K-2 5000 m event at the 1990 ICF Canoe Sprint World Championships in Poznań.
