= Declan Burns =

Irish sprint canoer

Declan Burns (born 26 June 1956) is an Irish canoe sprinter who competed from the mid-1970s to the late 1980s. At the 1976 Summer Olympics in Montreal, he was eliminated in the repechages of both the K-2 500 m and the K-4 1000 m events. Four years later in Moscow, Burns was eliminated in the repechages of the K-1 500 m event. At his third and final Summer Olympics in Seoul, he was eliminated in the semifinals of the K-2 1000 m event.
