= Romice Haralambie =

Romanian canoeist

Medal record

Men's canoe sprint

World Championships
Silver medal – second place	1991 Paris	C-2 10000 m

Romice Haralambie is a Romanian sprint canoer who competed in the early 1990s. He won a gold medal in the C-2 10000 m event at the 1991 ICF Canoe Sprint World Championships in Paris.
