= Mažeika =

- Lithuanian surname
- m.: Mažeika
- f.: (unmarried): Mažeikaitė, Mažeikytė
- f.: (married): Mažeikienė
- Origin: from 'mažas': "small", "short"
- Related names: Mazejka; translit. from Russian: Mazheika,/Mazheyka/Mozheyko/Mozheiko, Polish: Możejko

Mažeika or Mažeikis is a Lithuanian language family name. Notable people with the surname include:

- Gediminas Mažeika (born 1978), Lithuanian football referee
- Kęstutis Mažeika, Lithuanian politician
- Martynas Mažeika (born 1985), Lithuanian basketball player
- Patrick Mazeika (born 1993), American professional baseball player for the San Francisco Giants organization
- Pranas Mažeika (1917–2007), Lithuanian basketball player
- Rasa Mažeikytė, Lithuanian cyclist
- Romas Mažeikis, Lithuanian footballer
- Sigita Mažeikaitė-Strečen (born 1958), Lithuanian handball player
