= Steven Wood =

Australian canoeist

Medal record

Representing Australia

Men's canoe sprint

Olympic Games
Bronze medal – third place	1992 Barcelona	K-4 1000 m

World Championship
Silver medal – second place	1991 Paris	K-4 10000 m
Bronze medal – third place	1986 Montreal	K-2 1000 m

Men's canoe marathon

World Championships
Gold medal – first place	1992 Brisbane	K-2

Steven Wood (17 March 1961 – 23 November 1995) was an Australian sprint and marathon canoeist who competed in the late 1980s and early 1990s. Competing in two Summer Olympics, he won a bronze medal in the K-4 1000 m event at Barcelona in 1992.

== Career ==
Wood won two medals at the ICF Canoe Sprint World Championships with a silver (K-4 1000 m: 1991) and a bronze (K-2 1000 m: 1986).

He was married to Anna Wood, a Dutch-born sprint canoeist who won two bronze medals at the Summer Olympics, one for Australia and one for the Netherlands. He was an Australian Institute of Sport scholarship holder in 1988 and 1991–1992. Wood died by suicide in Brisbane by hanging himself, possibly due to a recurring elbow injury.
