= António Brinco =

Portuguese canoeist

António Brinco (born 30 May 1968) is a Portuguese sprint canoeist who competed in the late 1980s and the early 1990s. At the 1988 Summer Olympics in Seoul, he was eliminated in the repechages of the K-2 1000 m event. Four years later in Barcelona, Brinco was eliminated in the semifinals of the K-4 1000 m event.
