= Jean-François Briand =

French sprint canoer (born 1965)

Jean-François Briand (born 1 March 1965 in Angers) is a French sprint canoeist.

== Career ==
Briand competed in the early 1990s. He was eliminated in the semifinals of the K-4 1000 m event at the 1992 Summer Olympics in Barcelona.
