= Oscar Chalupsky =

South African paddler

Oscar Chalupsky OLY (born 1 March 1963) is a South African paddler. He was South Africa's team captain at the 1992 Summer Olympics in Barcelona where he competed in K-4 1000 m event, reaching the semi-finals. He is also a 12-time World Surf Ski Champion - his latest win (2012) coming at the age of 49, 29 years after his first win.

He attended Westville Boys' High School in Durban, South Africa, achieving an Honours Blazer for Waterpolo (in 1979) and Rugby (1980). In 1979 he became the youngest ever South African to represent his country in lifesaving. In his final year at school, 1980, he represented Natal at Craven Week Rugby, received South African colours for water polo and life-saving, and became the first person to win both the junior and senior men's Iron Man titles at the South African Surf Lifesaving Championships.

He co-founded Epic Kayaks with Greg Barton and was vice president until 2015 when he joined Nelo Kayaks as CEO of the Surfski division. He is currently based in Portugal.

He remains active in the sport of surf ski worldwide continuously attending events and hosting coaching clinics.
