= Chris Barlow =

American sprint canoer

Personal information
- Born: December 12, 1961 (age 64) Bicester, Great Britain

Sport
- Sport: Canoeing
Medal record
Representing United States
Pan American Games
Silver medal – second place	1991 Havana	K-4 1000m
Silver medal – second place	1995 Mar del Plata	K-4 1000m
Bronze medal – third place	1991 Havana	K-4 500m

Neil Christopher "Chris" Barlow (born December 12, 1961 in Bicester, Great Britain) is a British-born American sprint canoer who competed in the early 1990s. He finished ninth in the K-4 1000 m event at the 1992 Summer Olympics in Barcelona.

He is a recognized figure in the San Diego, California area amongst the lifeguarding and firefighting community.
