= Svein Egil Solvang =

Norwegian canoeist (born 1968)

Svein Egil Solvang (born 1 May 1968) is a Norwegian sprint canoer who competed in the late 1980s. He finished eighth in the K-2 1000 m event at the 1988 Summer Olympics in Seoul.

He resides in Flekkefjord Municipality.
