= Kalimanto Tulus Widodo =

Indonesian cyclist (1965–2025)

Personal information
- Nickname: Kalimanto
- Born: 23 August 1965 Pontianak, Indonesia
- Died: 21 March 2025 (aged 59) Pontianak, Indonesia

Cycling career
- Sport: Cycling

Kalimanto Tulus Widodo (23 August 1965 – 21 March 2025) was an Indonesian cyclist. He competed in the men's sprint at the 1992 Summer Olympics and won two gold medals in the 1991 SEA Games. After retiring from professional cycling, he trained other cyclists in Pontianak. One of his students was Bernard Van Aert.

Kalimanto died from a heart attack on 21 March 2025, at the age of 59.
