= Olli Kolehmainen =

Finnish canoeist

Olli Petteri Kolehmainen (born 31 May 1967 in Mikkeli) is a Finnish former sprint canoeist who competed in the late 1980s and early 1990s. At the 1988 Summer Olympics in Seoul, he was eliminated in the semifinals of both the K-2 500 m and the K-2 1000 m events. Four years later in Barcelona, Kolehmainen was eliminated in the semifinals of the K-2 500 m event.
