= Belmiro Pentera =

Portuguese canoeist (born 1973)

Belmiro Pentera (born 10 March 1973) is a Portuguese sprint canoeist who competed in the early 1990s. He was eliminated in the semifinals of the K-4 1000 m event at the 1992 Summer Olympics in Barcelona.
