= Xue Bing =

Chinese sprint canoer (born 1966)

Personal information
- Born: 5 January 1966 (age 60)
- Height: 177 cm (5 ft 10 in)
- Weight: 80 kg (176 lb)
Medal record
Men's canoe sprint
Representing China
Asian Games
Gold medal – first place	1990 Beijing	K-4 1000 m
Bronze medal – third place	1990 Beijing	K-2 500 m

Xue Bing (薛冰, born 5 January 1966) is a Chinese canoe sprinter who competed in the late 1980s. At the 1988 Summer Olympics in Seoul, he was eliminated in the repechages of the K-2 500 m event and the semifinals of the K-2 1000 m.
