= Jozef Turza =

Czechoslovak sprint canoer (born 1972)

Jozef Turza (born July 24, 1972 in Komárno) is a Czechoslovak sprint canoer who competed in the early 1990s. He finished fourth in the K-4 1000 m event at the 1992 Summer Olympics in Barcelona.
