= Petar Godev =

Bulgarian canoeist

Medal record

Men's canoe sprint

World Championships
| Bronze medal – third place | 1989 Plovidv | K-4 500 m |

Petar Godev (Bulgarian: Петър Годев) (born June 7, 1969) is a Bulgarian sprint canoer who competed from the late 1980s to the early 1990s. He won a bronze medal in the K-4 500 m event at the 1989 ICF Canoe Sprint World Championships in Plovdiv.

Godev also competed in two Summer Olympics, earning his best finish of eighth in the K-4 1000 m event at Barcelona in 1992.
