= Carsten Lömker =

German Olympic canoeist

Personal information
- Born: 3 September 1964 (age 62) Dortmund, West Germany

Sport
- Sport: Canoe sprint
Medal record
Representing West Germany
World Championships
Bronze medal – third place	1987 Duisburg	K-4 10000 m
Summer Universiade
Gold medal – first place	1987 Zagreb	K-2 1000 m
Silver medal – second place	1987 Zagreb	K-2 500 m

Carsten Lömker (born 3 September 1964) is a West German sprint canoer who competed in the late 1980s. He won a bronze medal in the K-4 10000 m event at the 1987 ICF Canoe Sprint World Championships in Duisburg.

Lömker also finished fourth in the K-2 1000 m event at the 1988 Summer Olympics in Seoul.

Carsten moved to Australia’s Gold Coast, in the early 90’s and coached elite kayakers, such as Nicholas Crilly, at the Australian Institute of Sport facility, at Pizzey Park.
