= Canoeing at the 1988 Summer Olympics – Men's K-2 1000 metres =

The men's K-2 1000 metres event was a pairs kayaking event conducted as part of the Canoeing at the 1988 Summer Olympics program.

== Medalists ==
Gold	Silver	Bronze
Greg Barton and Norman Bellingham (USA)	Ian Ferguson and Paul MacDonald (NZL)	Peter Foster and Kelvin Graham (AUS)

== Results ==
=== Heats ===
20 crews entered in three heats on September 27. The top three finishers from each of the heats advanced directly to the semifinals. The remaining eleven teams were relegated to the repechage heats.

Heat 1
1.	Bruno Dreossi and Alessandro Pieri (ITA)	3:25.76	QS
2.	Sergey Kalesnik and Sergey Galkov (URS)	3:27.06	QS
3.	Mikko Kolehmainen and Olli Kolehmainen (FIN)	3:27.52	QS
4.	António Brinco and Eduardo Gomes (POR)	3:31.95	QR
5.	Alberto Sánchez and Gregorio Vicente (ESP)	3:32.97	QR
6.	Donald Brien and Colin Shaw (CAN)	3:35.30	QR
7.	Svein Egil Solvang and Harald Amundsen (NOR)	3:36.85	QR
Heat 2
1.	Ian Ferguson and Paul MacDonald (NZL)	3:20.44	QS
2.	Greg Barton and Norman Bellingham (USA)	3:20.50	QS
3.	Philippe Boccara and Pascal Boucherit (FRA)	3:23.00	QS
4.	Anders Ohlsén and Hans Olsson (SWE)	3:26.43	QR
5.	Daniel Stoian and Angelin Velea (ROU)	3:28.42	QR
6.	Niels Ellwanger and Carsten Lömker (FRG)	3:37.82	QR
7.	Declan Burns and Peter Connor (IRL)	3:41.18	QR
Heat 3
1.	Guido Behling and Torsten Krentz (GDR)	3:24.45	QS
2.	Peter Foster and Kelvin Graham (AUS)	3:25.66	QS
3.	Tibor Helyi and András Rajna (HUN)	3:26.00	QS
4.	Xue Bing and Ma Fuliang (CHN)	3:31.24	QR
5.	Andrew Sheriff and Kevin Smith (GBR)	3:33.16	QR
6.	Park Cha-Geun and Cheon in-Sik (KOR)	3:47.21	QR

=== Repechages ===
Taking place on September 27, the top three competitors in each of the two repechages advanced to the semifinals.

Repechage 1
1.	Daniel Stoian and Angelin Velea (ROU)	3:31.51	QS
2.	Donald Brien and Colin Shaw (CAN)	3:38.74	QS
3.	Xue Bing and Ma Fuliang (CHN)	3:39.56	QS
4.	Declan Burns and Peter Connor (IRL)	3:43.02
5.	António Brinco and Eduardo Gomes (POR)	3:47.99
Repechage 2
1.	Anders Ohlsén and Hans Olsson (SWE)	3:26.75	QS
2.	Andrew Sheriff and Kevin Smith (GBR)	3:31.78	QS
3.	Niels Ellwanger and Carsten Lömker (FRG)	3:31.95	QS
4.	Svein Egil Solvang and Harald Amundsen (NOR)	3:32.07
5.	Alberto Sánchez and Gregorio Vicente (ESP)	3:32.92
6.	Park Cha-Geun and Cheon in-Sik (KOR)	3:36.70

=== Semifinals ===
The top three finishers in each of the three semifinals (raced on September 29) advanced to the final.

Semifinal 1
1.	Daniel Stoian and Angelin Velea (ROU)	3:25.91	QF
2.	Peter Foster and Kelvin Graham (AUS)	3:26.87	QF
3.	Niels Ellwanger and Carsten Lömker (FRG)	3:28.91	QF
4.	Declan Burns and Peter Connor (IRL)	3:38.92
5.	Bruno Dreossi and Alessandro Pieri (ITA)	4:11.90
-	Philippe Boccara and Pascal Boucherit (FRA)	DISQ
Semifinal 2
1.	Ian Ferguson and Paul MacDonald (NZL)	3:23.13	QF
2.	Tibor Helyi and András Rajna (HUN)	3:24.24	QF
3.	Svein Egil Solvang and Harald Amundsen (NOR)	3:25.00	QF
4.	Sergey Kalesnik and Sergey Galkov (URS)	3:27.03
5.	Donald Brien and Colin Shaw (CAN)	3:30.29
6.	Andrew Sheriff and Kevin Smith (GBR)	3:31.65
Semifinal 3
1.	Greg Barton and Norman Bellingham (USA)	3:25.36	QF
2.	Guido Behling and Torsten Krentz (GDR)	3:27.19	QF
3.	Anders Ohlsén and Hans Olsson (SWE)	3:28.31	QF
4.	Mikko Kolehmainen and Olli Kolehmainen (FIN)	3:30.98
5.	Xue Bing and Ma Fuliang (CHN)	3:42.91

Pre-Olympic favorite France was disqualified in the first semifinal for failing to make it to the starting line on time.

=== Final ===
The final was held on October 1.

Gold	Greg Barton and Norman Bellingham (USA)	3:32.42
Silver	Ian Ferguson and Paul MacDonald (NZL)	3:32.71
Bronze	Peter Foster and Kelvin Graham (AUS)	3:33.76
4.	Niels Ellwanger and Carsten Lömker (FRG)	3:34.63
5.	Guido Behling and Torsten Krentz (GDR)	3:35.44
6.	Daniel Stoian and Angelin Velea (ROU)	3:35.75
7.	Anders Ohlsén and Hans Olsson (SWE)	3:36.13
8.	Svein Egil Solvang and Harald Amundsen (NOR)	3:38.16
9.	Tibor Helyi and András Rajna (HUN)	3:43.43
