= Ma Fuliang =

Chinese canoeist

Ma Fuliang 马福良
Personal information
- Nationality: Chinese
- Born: 13 December 1968 (age 57) Pingdingshan, Henan, China
- Height: 1.85 m (6 ft 1 in)
- Weight: 75 kg (165 lb)

Sport
- Country: China
- Sport: Canoeing
Medal record
Men's canoe sprint
Representing China
Asian Games
Gold medal – first place	1990 Beijing	K-1 500 m
Bronze medal – third place	1990 Beijing	K-1 1000 m

Ma Fuliang (simplified Chinese: 马福良; traditional Chinese: 馬福良; born 13 December 1968 in Pingdingshan, Henan) is a Chinese sprint canoer who competed in the late 1980s. At the 1988 Summer Olympics in Seoul, he was eliminated in the repechages of the K-2 500 m event and the semifinals of the K-2 1000 m event.
