= Ian Rowling =

Australian sprint canoeist (born 1967)

Medal record

Men's canoe sprint

Olympic Games
Bronze medal – third place	1992 Barcelona	K-4 1000 m

World Championships
Silver medal – second place	1991 Paris	K-4 10000 m

Ian Rowling (born 10 February 1967), is an Australian sprint canoeist who competed in the early 1990s. At the 1992 Summer Olympics in Barcelona, he won a bronze medal in the K-4 1000 m event.

Rowling also won a silver medal in the K-4 10000 m event at the 1991 ICF Canoe Sprint World Championships in Paris.
