= Nicolae Juravschi =

Moldovan canoe racer and politician

Medal record

Men's canoe sprint

Representing Soviet Union

Olympic Games
Gold medal – first place	1988 Seoul	C-2 500 m
Gold medal – first place	1988 Seoul	C-2 1000 m

World Championships
Gold medal – first place	1989 Plovdiv	C-2 500 m
Gold medal – first place	1989 Plovdiv	C-4 500 m
Gold medal – first place	1989 Plovidv	C-4 1000 m
Gold medal – first place	1990 Poznań	C-2 500 m
Gold medal – first place	1990 Poznań	C-4 500 m
Gold medal – first place	1990 Poznań	C-4 1000 m
Gold medal – first place	1991 Paris	C-4 500 m
Gold medal – first place	1991 Paris	C-4 1000 m
Silver medal – second place	1991 Paris	C-2 500 m
Bronze medal – third place	1991 Paris	C-2 1000 m

Representing Moldova

Olympic Games
Silver medal – second place	1996 Atlanta	C-2 500 m

World Championships
Silver medal – second place	1995 Duisburg	C-2 500 m

Nicolae Juravschi (born 8 August 1964) is a Moldovan politician and former canoe sprinter. He won three Olympic medals in the C-2 event with his teammate Viktor Reneysky. In the Soviet era Juravschi trained at the Armed Forces sports society in Kishinev (now Chișinău), Moldova.

The pair won two gold medals at the 1988 Summer Olympics, as competitors for the USSR. In the next three years Juravschi won a total of eight world championship gold medals in the C-2 and C-4 events.

Despite this success Reneysky and Juravschi were not selected for the Unified Team at the 1992 Olympics, having been defeated in the trials. Juravschi was invited to represent Romania instead and reached two finals.

He then returned to Moldova and in 1995 persuaded his former partner Reneysky, from Belarus, to join forces once more and represent Moldova at the 1996 Olympics. They won a silver medal at the Atlanta games.

Juravski is now president of the Moldovan Olympic Committee and the Moldovan Canoe-Kayak Federation.

He has been a member of the Parliament of Moldova since 2011. Originally a member of the Liberal Democratic Party, he is now a member of the European People's Party of Moldova.
