= Attila Szabó (Slovak canoeist) =

Czechoslovak kayaker and speed canoeist

Medal record

Men's canoe sprint

World Championships
| Gold medal – first place | 1989 Plovdiv | K-1 10000 m |
| Silver medal – second place | 1987 Duisburg | K-1 10000 m |
| Bronze medal – third place | 1987 Duisburg | K-1 500 m |
| Bronze medal – third place | 1993 Copenhagen | K-1 10000 m |

Attila Szabó (born 19 February 1966 in Komárno) is a Czechoslovak-Slovak sprint canoeist of Hungarian ethnicity who competed from the late 1980s to the late 1990s. He won four medals at the ICF Canoe Sprint World Championships with a gold (K-1 10000 m: 1989), a silver (K-1 10000 m: 1987), and two bronzes (K-1 500 m: 1987, K-1 10000 m: 1993).

Szabó also competed in three Summer Olympics, earning his best finish of fourth in the K-4 1000 m event at Barcelona in 1992.
