= Juraj Kadnár =

Czechoslovak-Slovak sprint canoer (born 1972)

Medal record

Men's canoe sprint

World Championships
Bronze medal – third place	1991 Paris	K-2 10000m

Juraj Kadnár (born 5 September 1972 in Bratislava, Karlova Ves) is a Czechoslovak-Slovak sprint canoer who competed in the early to mid-1990s. He won a bronze medal in the K-2 10000m event at the 1991 ICF Canoe Sprint World Championships in Paris for Czechoslovakia.

Kadnár also competed in three Summer Olympics, earning his best finish of fourth in the K-4 1000 m event at Barcelona in 1992, also for Czechoslovakia. He earned gold, silver and bronze medals on European Championships.

Juraj Kadnár graduated from the Comenius University in Bratislava, Slovakia - The Faculty of Physical Education and Sports.
