= Harald Amundsen =

Norwegian sprint canoer (born 1962)

Medal record

Men's canoe sprint

World Championships
Gold medal – first place	1987 Duisburg	K-4 10000 m
Silver medal – second place	1983 Tampere	K-4 10000 m

Harald Amundsen (born 30 November 1962) is a Norwegian sprint canoer who competed in the 1980s. He won two medals in the K-4 10000 m event at the ICF Canoe Sprint World Championships with a gold in 1987 and a silver in 1983.

Amundsen also competed in two Summer Olympics, earning his best finish of eighth in the K-2 1000 m event at Seoul in 1988.

His older brother, Steinar, won two Olympic medals in the K-4 1000 m event with a gold in 1968 and a bronze in 1972.
