= Anders Ohlsén =

Swedish canoeist

Anders Ohlsén (born 23 June 1964) is a Swedish sprint canoeist who competed in the late 1980s and early 1990s. Competing in two Summer Olympics, he earned his best finish of seventh twice (1988: K-2 1000 m, 1992: K-4 1000 m).
