= Matteo Bruscoli =

Italian sprint canoer (born 1972)

Matteo Bruscoli (born 6 August 1972) is an Italian sprint canoer who competed in the early 1990s. He was eliminated in the semifinals of the K-4 1000 m event at the 1992 Summer Olympics in Barcelona.
