= Paolo Tommasini =

Italian canoeist

Medal record

Men's canoe sprint

Representing Italy

World Championships
Silver medal – second place	1997 Dartmouth	K-2 200 m

Paolo Tommasini (born September 5, 1968) is an Italian sprint canoer who has competed in the 1990s. He won a silver medal in the K-2 200 m event at the 1997 ICF Canoe Sprint World Championships in Dartmouth.

Tommasini also competed in K-4 1000 m event at the 1992 Summer Olympics in Barcelona, but was eliminated in the semifinals.
