= Torsten Krentz =

German canoeist

Medal record

Men's canoe sprint

World Championships
Silver medal – second place	1989 Plovdiv	K-1 1000 m
Bronze medal – third place	1989 Plovdiv	K-4 1000 m
Bronze medal – third place	1990 Poznań	K-1 10000 m
Bronze medal – third place	1990 Poznań	K-4 1000 m

Torsten Krentz (born 19 May 1966 in Demmin) is an East German sprint canoeist who competed in the late 1980s and early 1990s. He won four medals at the ICF Canoe Sprint World Championships with a silver (K-1 1000 m: 1989) and three bronzes (K-1 10000 m: 1990, K-4 1000 m: 1989, 1990).

Krentz also finished fifth in the K-2 1000 m event at the 1988 Summer Olympics in Seoul.
