= Pablo Grate =

Swedish canoeist

Medal record

Men's canoe sprint

World Championships
Bronze medal – third place	1991 Paris	K-4 10000 m

Pablo Grate (born December 23, 1967) is a Swedish sprint canoer who competed from the early 1990s to the early 2000s. He won a bronze medal in the K-4 10000 m event at the 1991 ICF Canoe Sprint World Championships in Paris.

Grate also finished seventh in the K-4 1000 m event at the 1992 Summer Olympics in Barcelona.
