= Matthias Hoppe =

East German canoeist

Medal record

Men's canoe sprint

World Championships
Silver medal – second place	1990 Poznań	K-4 500 m

Mathias Hoppe (born 6 August 1970) is an East German sprint canoer who competed in the early 1990s. He won a silver medal in the K-4 500 m event at the 1990 ICF Canoe Sprint World Championships in Poznań.
