= António Monteiro (canoeist) =

Portuguese canoeist (born 1972)

António Monteiro (born 15 April 1972) is a Portuguese sprint canoeist who competed in the early 1990s. He was eliminated in the semifinals of the K-4 1000 m event at the 1992 Summer Olympics in Barcelona.
