= Kelvin Graham =

Australian canoeist (born 1964)

Olympic medal record

Men's canoe sprint
Bronze medal – third place	1988 Seoul	K-2 1000 m
Bronze medal – third place	1992 Barcelona	K-4 1000 m

Kelvin Graham (born 27 April 1964) is an Australian sprint canoeist who competed in the late 1980s and early 1990s. Competing in two Summer Olympics, he won two bronze medals with one in 1988 in K-2 1000 m and the second in 1992 in K-4 1000 m.
