= Hans Olsson (canoeist) =

Swedish canoeist (born 1964)

Medal record

Men's canoe sprint

World Championships
Bronze medal – third place	1990 Poznań	K-4 10000 m
Bronze medal – third place	1991 Paris	K-4 10000 m

Hans Olsson (born December 18, 1964) is a Swedish sprint canoer who competed from the late 1980s to the mid-1990s. He won two medals at the ICF Canoe Sprint World Championships with two bronzes (K-4 10000 m: 1990, 1991).

Olsson also competed in two Summer Olympics, earning his best finish of seventh twice (K-2 1000 m: 1988, K-4 1000 m: 1992).
