= Francisco Cabezas =

Spanish sprint canoer

Francisco Cabezas (born October 4, 1969) is a Spanish sprint canoer who competed in the early 1990s. He was eliminated in the semifinals of the K-4 1000 m event at the 1992 Summer Olympics in Barcelona.
