= Oliver Kegel =

German sprint canoeist (born 1961)

Medal record

Men's canoe sprint

Olympic Games
Gold medal – first place	1992 Barcelona	K-4 1000 m

World Championships
Gold medal – first place	1991 Paris	K-4 500 m
Gold medal – first place	1991 Paris	K-4 10000 m
Gold medal – first place	1993 Copenhagen	K-4 1000 m
Gold medal – first place	1993 Copenhagen	K-4 10000 m
Silver medal – second place	1991 Paris	K-4 1000 m
Silver medal – second place	1993 Copenhagen	K-4 500 m
Bronze medal – third place	1987 Dusiburg	K-4 10000 m
Bronze medal – third place	1994 Mexico City	K-4 1000 m

Oliver Kegel (born 14 June 1961 in Berlin) is a West German-German sprint canoeist who competed from the mid-1980s to the early 1990s. Competing in two Summer Olympics, he won a gold medal in the K-4 1000 m event at Barcelona in 1992.

Kegel also won eight medals at the ICF Canoe Sprint World Championships with four golds (K-4 500 m: 1991, K-4 1000 m: 1993, K-4 10000 m: 1991, 1993), two silvers (K-4 500 m: 1993, K-4 1000 m: 1991), and two bronzes (K-4 1000 m: 1994, K-4 10000 m: 1987).
