= Sean Bloch =

South African cyclist (born 1973)

Personal information
- Born: 16 December 1973 (age 52) South Africa

Cycling career
- Sport: Cycling

Sean Bloch (born 16 December 1973) is a South African former Olympic cyclist.

== Early life ==
Bloch was born in South Africa, and is Jewish. He is the older brother of Olympian cyclist Garen Bloch of South Africa.

== Cycling career ==
Bloch won 12 South African national titles, and held South African national cycling records in the 500-m individual time trial (junior and senior), 1000-m individual time trial (senior), flying 200-m time trial (senior), and individual pursuit (junior).

He competed in two cycling events for Team South Africa at the 1992 Summer Olympics in Barcelona, at the age of 18. In the individual time trial event he finished in 26th place with a time of 1:10.145, and in the individual sprint event he finished 22nd in the preliminaries with a time of 12.186, lost to Frederic Magne of France in the second round, and was eliminated by Ainārs Ķiksis of Latvia in his consolation race.

He was Team Australia’s cycling captain at the 2013 Maccabiah Games. He was then Team Australia's flag bearer and team captain at the 2017 Maccabiah Games, where he won a silver medal for South Africa in the Open-Cycling-ITT 21 km 40+ (M) with a time of 30:52.
