= Miyuki Kobayashi (canoeist) =

Japanese canoeist

Personal information
- Born: November 10, 1967 (age 58) Gunma, Japan
- Height: 159 cm (5 ft 3 in)
- Weight: 55 kg (121 lb)
Medal record
Women's canoe sprint
Representing Japan
Asian Games
Silver medal – second place	1990 Beijing	K-2 500 m
Bronze medal – third place	1990 Beijing	K-4 500 m
Silver medal – second place	1994 Hiroshima	K-2 500 m

Miyuki Kobayashi (Japanese 小林美幸, born November 10, 1967) is a Japanese sprint canoer who competed in the late 1980s and early 1990s. At the 1988 Summer Olympics in Seoul, she was eliminated in the repechages of the K-2 500 m while withdrawing prior to the heats of the K-1 500 m event. Four years later in Barcelona, Kobayashi was eliminated in the semifinals of the K-2 500 m event.
