= Peter Connor (canoeist) =

Irish sprint canoer (born 1963)

Peter Connor (born 18 May 1963) is an Irish canoe sprinter who competed in the late 1980s. At the 1988 Summer Olympics in Seoul, he was eliminated in the semifinals of the K-2 1000 m event.
