= Andrey Balabanov =

Russian canoeist

Medal record

Men's canoe sprint

Representing Soviet Union

World Championships
Bronze medal – third place	1990 Poznań	C-2 10000 m

Representing Ukraine

World Championships
Bronze medal – third place	1993 Copenhagen	C-2 10000 m
Bronze medal – third place	1993 Copenhagen	C-4 1000 m

Goodwill Games
Bronze medal – third place	1994 Saint Petersburg	C-2 1000 m

Andrey Balabanov (born 17 August 1966 in Kherson, Ukrainian SSR) is a Soviet-born Ukrainian sprint canoer who competed in the early 1990s. He won three bronze medals at the ICF Canoe Sprint World Championships with two in the C-2 10000 m (1990, 1993) and one in the C-4 1000 m (1993) events.
