= László Fidel =

Hungarian canoeist (born 1965)

Medal record

Men's canoe sprint

Representing Hungary

Olympic Games
Silver medal – second place	1992 Barcelona	K-4 1000 m

World Championships
Gold medal – first place	1986 Montreal	K-4 1000 m
Gold medal – first place	1987 Duisburg	K-2 500 m
Gold medal – first place	1987 Duisburg	K-4 1000 m
Gold medal – first place	1990 Poznań	K-4 1000 m
Gold medal – first place	1991 Paris	K-4 1000 m
Silver medal – second place	1991 Paris	K-4 500 m

László Fidel (born June 29, 1965) is a Hungarian sprint canoer who competed from the late 1980s to the early 1990s. He won a silver medal in the K-4 1000 m event at the 1992 Summer Olympics in Barcelona.

Fidel also won a total of six medals at the ICF Canoe Sprint World Championships with five golds (K-2 500 m: 1987, K-4 1000 m: 1986, 1987, 1990, 1991) and a silver (K-4 500 m: 1991).
