= Viktor Reneysky =

Canoe racer

Medal record

Men's canoe sprint

Representing Soviet Union

Olympic Games
Gold medal – first place	1988 Seoul	C-2 500 m
Gold medal – first place	1988 Seoul	C-2 1000 m

World Championships
Gold medal – first place	1989 Plovdiv	C-2 500 m
Gold medal – first place	1989 Plovdiv	C-4 500 m
Gold medal – first place	1989 Plovidv	C-4 1000 m
Gold medal – first place	1990 Poznań	C-2 500 m
Gold medal – first place	1990 Poznań	C-4 500 m
Gold medal – first place	1990 Poznań	C-4 1000 m
Gold medal – first place	1991 Paris	C-4 500 m
Gold medal – first place	1991 Paris	C-4 1000 m
Silver medal – second place	1986 Montreal	C-2 500 m
Silver medal – second place	1991 Paris	C-2 500 m
Bronze medal – third place	1991 Paris	C-2 1000 m

Representing Moldova

Olympic Games
Silver medal – second place	1996 Atlanta	C-2 500 m

World Championships
Silver medal – second place	1995 Duisburg	C-2 500 m

Viktor Iosifovich Reneysky (Russian: Виктор Иосифович Ренейский, given name also transliterated Victor and surname Reneyskiy, Reneiski, or Reneischi, born 24 January 1967 in Babruysk) is a sprint canoeist from Belarus who won three Olympic medals for the USSR and Moldova in the C-2 event with his teammate Nikolaï Juravschi. He also won a total of nine world titles, more than any other Canadian canoe paddler of his generation. Reneysky trained at Dynamo in Babruysk.

Reneysky and Juravschi won two gold medals at the 1988 Summer Olympics as competitors for the USSR. This success was followed by consecutive C-2 500 m world championship golds in 1989 and 1990.

C-4 events were included in the world championships for the first time and were initially dominated by the USSR. Reneysky won double C-4 gold (500 m and 1000 m) in 1989, 1990 and 1991.

Despite this run of success Reneysky and Juravschi were not selected for the 1992 Barcelona Olympics, having been defeated in the trials by Maseikov and Dovgalenok who justified their inclusion by going on to win the C-2 500 m gold medal.

The break-up of the Soviet Union meant that Reneysky and Juravschi went their separate ways. Reneysky is from Belarus whereas Juravschi represented Romania and then his newly independent homeland of Moldova.

However, in 1995 Juravschi persuaded his former partner to join forces once more and represent Moldova at the 1996 Atlanta Olympics. They won silver.

The following year Reneysky was competing for his native Belarus and won the final world championship gold (C-4 200 m) of his career.

Reneysky then went into coaching as is now head of the Belarus national team. In 2005 in Plovdiv, Bulgaria, he saw his young (average age 19) protégés (Rabchanka / Vaitsishkin / Shcharbak / Vauchetski) beat his own sixteen-year-old C-4 1000 m senior world record.
