= John Foster (water polo) =

Australian water polo player

Personal information
- Full name: John Lewis Foster
- Nationality: Australian
- Born: 11 May 1931
- Died: 28 January 2013 (aged 81)

Sport
- Sport: Water polo

John Lewis 'Jake' Foster (11 May 1931 – 28 January 2013) was an Australian water polo player. He competed at the 1952 Summer Olympics and the 1956 Summer Olympics.

His daughter Margot won a bronze in the women's coxed four event at the 1984 Summer Olympics in Los Angeles and son Peter won the bronze medal in the K-2 1000 m kayaking event at the 1988 Summer Olympics in Seoul.
