= Liu Qinglan =

Chinese canoeist

Medal record

Women's canoe sprint

World Championships
Bronze medal – third place	1991 Paris	K-4 500 m

Liu Qinglan is a Chinese sprint canoer. Competing in the early 1990s, she won a bronze medal in the K-4 500m event at the 1991 ICF Canoe Sprint World Championships in Paris.
