= Karol Becker =

Czechoslovak sprint canoer

Medal record

Men's canoe sprint

World Championships
Bronze medal – third place	1991 Paris	K-4 1000 m

Karol Becker is a Czechoslovak sprint canoer who competed in the early 1990s. He won a bronze medal in the K-4 1000 m event at the 1991 ICF Canoe Sprint World Championships in Paris.
