= Dejon Slavov =

Bulgarian sprint canoer

Medal record

Men's canoe sprint

World Championships
Bronze medal – third place	1990 Poznań	C-4 500 m
Bronze medal – third place	1990 Poznań	C-4 1000 m
Bronze medal – third place	1991 Paris	C-4 1000 m

Dejon Slavov is a Bulgarian sprint canoer who competed in the early 1990s. He won three bronze medals at the ICF Canoe Sprint World Championships (C-4 500 m: 1990, C-4 1000 m: 1990, 1991).
