= Dirk Jan van Hameren =

Dutch cyclist

Personal information
- Full name: Theodorus Johannes Antonius Maria van Hameren
- Born: 14 April 1965 Leiden, Netherlands
- Height: 187 cm (6 ft 2 in)
- Weight: 87 kg (192 lb)

Cycling career
- Sport: Cycling
- Discipline: Track cycling

Theodorus Johannes Antonius Maria "Dirk Jan" van Hameren (born 14 July 1965) is a Dutch track cyclist. He competed in the men's sprint and men's 1 km time trial at the 1992 Summer Olympics and in the men's 1 km time trial at the 1996 Summer Olympics.

== See also ==
- List of Dutch Olympic cyclists
