= Andrés Minelli =

Argentine swimmer

Personal information
- Born: 22 March 1971 (age 55)

Sport
- Sport: Swimming

Andrés Minelli (born 22 March 1971) is an Argentine swimmer. He competed in two events at the 1992 Summer Olympics.
