= José Lovito =

Argentine cyclist

Personal information
- Born: 13 January 1970 (age 56)

Cycling career
- Sport: Cycling

José Lovito (born 13 January 1970) is an Argentine former cyclist. He competed in the men's sprint at the 1992 Summer Olympics.
