= Sebastián Lasave =

Argentine swimmer

Personal information
- Born: 10 June 1971
- Died: 30 August 2001 (aged 30)

Sport
- Sport: Swimming

Sebastián Lasave (10 June 1971 – 30 August 2001) was an Argentine backstroke and freestyle swimmer. He competed in two events at the 1992 Summer Olympics.
