= 1991 ICF Canoe Sprint World Championships =

International canoe competition

- Host city: Paris, France
- Opening: 21 August 1991
- Closing: 25 August 1991

The 1991 ICF Canoe Sprint World Championships were held in Paris, France from 21 to 25 August 1991.

The men's competition consisted of eight Canadian (single paddle, open boat) and nine kayak events. Five events were held for the women, all in kayak. This was the first championship with a unified German team for the first time since 1938 following separate East German and West German teams that competed from 1950 to 1990.

This was the 24th championships in canoe sprint.

== Medal summary ==
=== Men's ===
==== Canoe ====
Event	Gold	Time	Silver	Time	Bronze	Time
C-1 500 m	Michał Śliwiński (URS)		Nikolay Bukhalov (BUL)		Olaf Heukrodt (GER)	
C-1 1000 m	Ivan Klementiev (URS)		Nikolay Bukhalov (BUL)		Matthias Röder (GER)	
C-1 10000 m	Zsolt Bohács (HUN)		Ivan Klementiev (URS)		Andrew Train (GBR)	
C-2 500 m	Hungary; Attila Pálizs; Attila Szabó		Soviet Union; Viktor Reneisky; Nicolae Juravschi		France; Olivier Boivin; Didier Hoyer	
C-2 1000 m	Germany; Ulrich Papke; Ingo Spelly		France; Olivier Boivin; Didier Hoyer		Soviet Union; Viktor Reneisky; Nicolae Juravschi	
C-2 10000 m	Hungary; István Gyulay; Pál Pétervári		Romania; Gheorghe Andriev; Romice Haralambie		Great Britain; Andrew Train; Stephen Train	
C-4 500 m	Soviet Union; Viktor Reneisky; Nicolae Juravschi; Yuriy Gurin; Valeriy Veshko		France; Benoît Bernard; Jöel Bettin; Philippe Renaud; Pascal Sylvoz		Germany; Axel Berndt; Andreas Dittmer; Sven Montag; Thomas Zereske	
C-4 1000 m	Soviet Union; Viktor Reneisky; Nicolae Juravschi; Yuriy Gurin; Valeriy Veshko		Germany; Olaf Heukrodt; Sven Montag; Ulrich Papke; Ingo Spelly		Bulgaria; Nikolay Bukhalov; Traicho Draganov; Paisiy Lubenov; Dejan Slavov	

==== Kayak ====
Event	Gold	Time	Silver	Time	Bronze	Time
K-1 500 m	Renn Crichlow (CAN)		Knut Holmann (NOR)		Zsolt Gyulay (HUN)	
K-1 1000 m	Knut Holmann (NOR)		Ferenc Csipes (HUN)		Greg Barton (USA)	
K-1 10000 m	Greg Barton (USA)		Beniamino Bonomi (ITA)		Morten Ivarsen (NOR)	
K-2 500 m	Spain; Juan José Román; Juan Manuel Sánchez		Germany; Kay Bluhm; Torsten Guitsche		Hungary; Ferenc Csipes; Zsolt Gyulay	
K-2 1000 m	Germany; Kay Bluhm; Torsten Guitsche		Spain; Juan José Román; Juan Manuel Sánchez		Hungary; Ákos Angyal; Béla Petrovics	
K-2 10000 m	France; Philippe Boccara; Pascal Boucherit		Germany; Kay Bluhm; Torsten Guitsche		Czechoslovakia; Róbert Erban; Juraj Kadnár	
K-4 500 m	Germany; Detlef Hofmann; Oliver Kegel; Thomas Reineck; André Wohllebe		Hungary; Attila Ábrahám; Ferenc Cspies; Gyula Kajner; Béla Petrovics		Soviet Union; Sergey Galkov; Oleg Gorobiy; Sergey Kirsanov; Andrey Plitkin	
K-4 1000 m	Hungary; Attila Ábrahám; Attila Adám; Attila Adrovicz; László Fidel		Germany; Detlef Hofmann; Oliver Kegel; Thomas Reineck; André Wohllebe		Czechoslovakia; Karol Becker; Richard Botio; Karel Hrudik; Michael Matus	
K-4 10000 m	Germany; Detlef Hofmann; Oliver Kegel; Thomas Reineck; André Wohllebe		Australia; Ramon Andersson; Clint Robinson; Ian Rowling; Steven Wood		Sweden; Jonas Fager; Pablo Grate; Hans Olsson; Peter Orban	

=== Women's ===
==== Kayak ====
Event	Gold	Time	Silver	Time	Bronze	Time
K-1 500 m	Katrin Borchert (GER)		Rita Kőbán (HUN)		Josefa Idem (ITA)	
K-1 5000 m	Josefa Idem (ITA)		Anna Wood (AUS)		Katrin Borchert (GER)	
K-2 500 m	Germany; Ramona Portwich; Anke von Seck		Hungary; Éva Dónusz; Erika Mészáros		Sweden; Agneta Andersson; Anna Olsson	
K-2 5000 m	Germany; Ramona Portwich; Anett Schuck		Sweden; Maria Haglund; Susanne Rosenquist		France; Bernadette Bregeon; Sabine Gotschy	
K-4 500 m	Germany; Katrin Borchert; Monika Bunke; Ramona Portwich; Anke von Seck		Hungary; Éva Dónusz; Katalin Gyulay; Rita Kőbán; Erika Mészáros		China; Liu Qinglan; Ning Menghua; Wang Jing; Wen Yanfang	

== Medals table ==
Rank	Nation	Gold	Silver	Bronze	Total
1	Germany	8	4	4	16
2	Hungary	4	5	3	12
3	Soviet Union	4	2	2	8
4	France	1	2	2	5
5	Italy	1	1	1	3
5	Norway	1	1	1	3
7	Spain	1	1	0	2
8	United States	1	0	1	2
9	Canada	1	0	0	1
10	Bulgaria	0	2	1	3
11	Australia	0	2	0	2
12	Sweden	0	1	2	3
13	Romania	0	1	0	1
14	Czechoslovakia	0	0	2	2
14	Great Britain	0	0	2	2
16	China	0	0	1	1
Totals (16 entries)		22	22	22	66
