= Sven Montag =

German canoeist

Medal record

Men's canoe sprint

World Championships
Silver medal – second place	1991 Paris	C-4 1000 m
Bronze medal – third place	1991 Paris	C-4 500 m

Sven Montag is a German sprint canoer who competed in the early 1990s. He won two medals at the 1991 ICF Canoe Sprint World Championships in Paris with a silver in the C-4 1000 m and a bronze in the C-4 500 m events.

He is married with Jana Montag (geb.Schildbach) the canoe junior world champion from 1989. They have a son together, Max Montag (21.08.09) and live in Berlin.
