= Pablo Minelli =

Argentine swimmer

Personal information
- Born: 17 November 1969 (age 56)

Sport
- Sport: Swimming

Pablo Minelli (born 17 November 1969) is an Argentine swimmer. He competed in two events at the 1992 Summer Olympics.
