= Carol Montag =

American folk singer-songwriter

Carol Montag is an American folk singer-songwriter, who was born in Ames, Iowa, United States. Referred to by Tom Paxton as "the best to come out of Iowa since Bonnie Koloc", she has opened on several occasions for Arlo Guthrie. She is also one third of the Cedar Rapids, Iowa-based Christmas-themed trio Tribute, with Nina Swanson and Kathy Donnelly which performs yearly during the season.

== Discography ==
- Song for Carrie, 1985, Salek Street Records
- White, 1987, Salek Street Records
- Marigolds, 2000, Monday's Music
