= Park Byeong-hun =

South Korean sprint canoer (born 1973)

- Hangul: 박병훈
- Hanja: 朴炳勳
- RR: Bak Byeonghun
- MR: Pak Pyŏnghun

Park Byeong-hun (born March 16, 1973) is a South Korean sprint canoer who competed in the early 1990s. He was eliminated in the heats of the K-4 1000 m event at the 1992 Summer Olympics in Barcelona. He had also participated in the Kayak Fours, 1,000 metres, Men (Olympics - unknown year).

He had studied at the Korea National Sport University.
