= Nikolay Georgiev (canoeist) =

Bulgarian canoeist (born 1960)

Nikolay Blagoyev Georgiev (Bulgarian: Николай Благоев Георгиев) (born June 18, 1960, in Plovdiv) is a Bulgarian sprint canoer who competed in the early 1990s. He finished eighth in the K-4 1000 m event at the 1992 Summer Olympics in Barcelona.
