= Norman Bellingham =

American canoeist (born 1964)

Personal information
- Born: December 23, 1964 (age 61) Fairfax, Virginia, U.S.
Medal record
Men's canoe sprint
Representing the United States
Olympic Games
Gold medal – first place	1988 Seoul	K-2 1000 m
Pan American Games
Gold medal – first place	1987 Indianapolis	K-1 500m
Gold medal – first place	1987 Indianapolis	K-2 1000m

Norman Dean Bellingham (born December 23, 1964) is an American sprint canoer and Olympic champion who competed from the mid-1980s to the early 1990s.

== Background ==
Competing in three Summer Olympics, he won gold in the K-2 1000 m event at Seoul in 1988. Bellingham was Chief Operating Officer of the United States Olympic Committee from 2006 to 2011. He previously had been employed as Senior Vice President, Strategic Planning of Turner Broadcasting System in Atlanta, a position he held from 2002.

Bellingham attended Richard Montgomery High School and graduated in 1983. Bellingham is also a graduate of Harvard University where he earned an honors BA in economics in 1993, and ultimately returned in 1998 to earn his MBA.
