= Możejko =

Możejko is a Polonized form of the Lithuanian surname Mažeika. Notable people with the surname include:

- Andrzej Możejko, Polish professional footballer

== Fictional characters ==
- Orest Możejko from Father Matthew (TV series)
