= Hae-Ja Kim de Rimasa =

Argentine table tennis player

Personal information
- Nationality: Argentine
- Born: 7 September 1949 (age 75)

Sport
- Sport: Table tennis

Hae-Ja Kim de Rimasa (born 7 September 1949) is an Argentine table tennis player. She competed at the 1988 Summer Olympics and the 1992 Summer Olympics.
