= Rolf Furrer =

Swiss cyclist

Personal information
- Born: 4 August 1966 (age 60)

Cycling career
- Sport: Cycling

Rolf Furrer (born 4 August 1966) is a Swiss former cyclist. He competed in the men's sprint at the 1992 Summer Olympics.
