= Vladimir Mozheyko =

Medal record

Men's canoe sprint

World Championships
Bronze medal – third place	1990 Poznań	K-2 10000 m

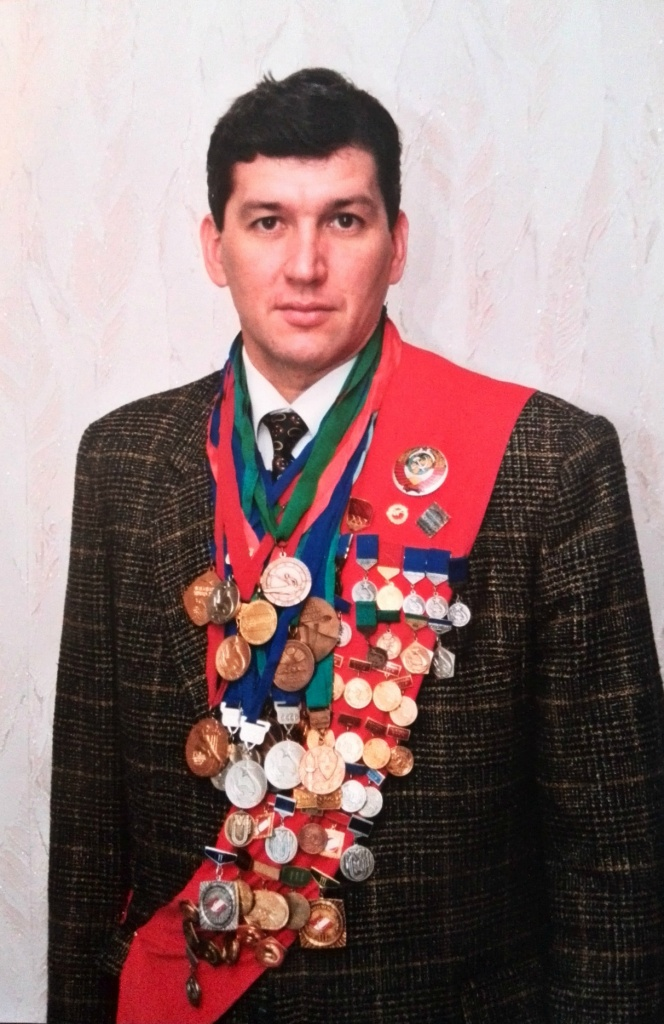
Image of Mozheiko Vladimir Nikolaevich

Vladimir Nikolayevich Mozheyko (also Vladimir Mozeiko; Russian: Влади́мир Никола́евич Може́йко) is a Soviet sprint canoer who competed in the early 1990s. He won a bronze medal in the K-2 10000 m event at the 1990 ICF Canoe Sprint World Championships in Poznań.
