= Cristian Maino =

Argentine canoeist (born 1971)

Cristian Maino (born July 9, 1971) is an Argentine sprint canoer who competed in the early 1990s. He was eliminated in the semifinals of the K-4 1000 m event at the 1992 Summer Olympics in Barcelona.
