= Alberto Sánchez (canoeist) =

Spanish canoeist

Alberto Sánchez Jiménez (Note: In this Spanish name, the first or paternal surname is Sánchez and the second or maternal family name is Jiménez.) (born 12 August 1969) is a Spanish sprint canoeist who competed in the late 1980s and early 1990s. At the 1988 Summer Olympics in Seoul, he was eliminated in the repechages of the K-2 1000 m event. Four years later in Barcelona, Sánchez was eliminated in the semifinals of the K-4 1000 m event.
