= Traicho Draganov =

Bulgarian sprint canoer

Medal record

Men's canoe sprint

World Championships
Bronze medal – third place	1990 Poznań	C-4 500 m
Bronze medal – third place	1990 Poznań	C-4 1000 m
Bronze medal – third place	1991 Paris	C-4 1000 m

Traicho Draganov (Bulgarian: Трайчо Драганов) is a Bulgarian sprint canoer who competed in the late 1980s and early 1990s. He won two bronze medals at the 1990 ICF Canoe Sprint World Championships in Poznań, earning them in the C-4 500 m and C-4 1000 m events, and one bronze medal at the 1991 ICF Canoe Sprint World Championships in Paris, earning them in C-4 1000 m events.
