= Ken Carpenter (cyclist) =

American racing cyclist (born 1965)

Personal information
- Born: December 31, 1965 (age 60) La Mesa, California, United States

Cycling career
- Sport: Cycling
Medal record
Men's cycling
Representing United States
Pan American Games
Gold medal – first place	Indianapolis 1987	200m Match Sprint

Kenneth ("Ken") Michael Carpenter (born December 31, 1965) is a retired American road bicycle racer and track racer, who represented the United States at the 1988 and 1992 Summer Olympics. He won the Men's 200m Match Sprint at the 1987 Pan American Games. Carpenter was a professional rider from 1992 to 1995.
