= Jon Andrews =

New Zealand cyclist and coach

Personal information
- Full name: Jon David Andrews
- Born: 26 April 1967 (age 59) Christchurch, New Zealand
- Relative: Ellesse Andrews (daughter)
Medal record
Men's track cycling
Representing New Zealand
Commonwealth Games
Bronze medal – third place	1990 Auckland	Sprint
Bronze medal – third place	1990 Auckland	Time Trial

Jon David Andrews (born 26 April 1967) is a New Zealand cycling coach and former Olympic cyclist. He won two bronze medals at the 1990 Commonwealth Games. He competed at the 1992 Summer Olympics.

Andrews was awarded the New Zealand 1990 Commemoration Medal. He is the father of cyclist Ellesse Andrews.
