= Andrew Myers (cyclist) =

Jamaican cyclist

Personal information
- Born: 19 December 1968 (age 57)

Cycling career
- Sport: Cycling

Andrew Myers (born 19 December 1968) is a Jamaican former cyclist. He competed in two events at the 1992 Summer Olympics.
