= Finn O'Connor (canoeist) =

New Zealand canoeist (born 1971)

Finn Braden O'Connor (born 14 February 1971 in Christchurch) is a New Zealand sprint canoeist who competed in the early 1990s. He was eliminated in the semifinals of the K-4 1000 m event at the 1992 Summer Olympics in Barcelona.
