= Stephen Richards (canoeist) =

New Zealand canoeist (born 1965)

Stephen Richards (born 26 August 1965) is a New Zealand sprint canoeist who competed in the late 1980s and early 1990s. He was eliminated in the semifinals of the K-4 1000 m event at the 1988 Summer Olympics in Seoul. Four years later in Barcelona, he was eliminated in the semifinals of the same event.
