= Mark Scheib =

New Zealand canoeist

Personal information
- Nationality: New Zealander
- Born: 4 September 1967 (age 57); Stratford, New Zealand

Sport
- Sport: Canoe sprint

Mark Anthony Scheib (born 4 September 1967 in Stratford) is a New Zealand sprint canoeist who competed in the early 1990s. He was eliminated in the semifinals of the K-4 1000 m event at the 1992 Summer Olympics in Barcelona.
