= Ainārs Ķiksis =

Latvian cyclist

Personal information
- Born: 10 February 1972 (age 54) Valmiera, Latvia

Cycling career
- Sport: Cycling
- Discipline: Track
- Role: Rider
- Rider type: Sprinter
Medal record
Men's track cycling
Representing Latvia
World Championships
Silver medal – second place	1998 Bordeaux	Keirin

Ainārs Ķiksis (born 10 February 1972) is a Latvian former track cyclist. He competed at the 1992, 1996 and the 2000 Summer Olympics.

Ķiksis won a silver medal in the keirin at 1998 UCI Track Cycling World Championships.
