= Canoeing at the 1988 Summer Olympics – Women's K-4 500 metres =

The women's K-4 500 metres event was a fours kayaking event conducted as part of the Canoeing at the 1988 Summer Olympics program.

== Medalists ==
Gold	Silver	Bronze
East Germany; Birgit Schmidt; Anke Nothnagel; Ramona Portwich; Heike Singer	Hungary; Erika Géczi; Erika Mészáros; Éva Rakusz; Rita Kőbán	Bulgaria; Vanja Gesheva; Diana Paliiska; Ogniana Petkova; Borislava Ivanova

== Results ==
=== Heats ===
13 crews entered in two heats on September 27. The top three finishers from each of the heats advanced directly to the finals while the remaining seven teams were relegated to the semifinal.

Heat 1
1.	Birgit Schmidt, Anke Nothnagel, Ramona Portwich, and Heike Singer (GDR)	1:36.84	QF
2.	Irina Salomykova, Irina Khmelevskaya, Aleksandra Apanovich, and Nadezhda Kovalevich (URS)	1:37.78	QF
3.	Anna Olsson, Agneta Andersson, Susanne Wiberg, and Liselotte Olsson (SWE)	1:41.40	QF
4.	Traci Phillips, Shelia Conover, Cathy Marino-Geers, and Shirley Dery-Batlik (USA)	1:41.77	QS
5.	Nancy Olmsted, Barbara Olmsted, Caroline Brunet, and Sheila Taylor (CAN)	1:43.52	QS
6.	Sylvie Cuvilly, Claudine LeRoux, Virginie Vandamme, and Béatrice Basson (FRA)	1:45.41	QS
7.	Lee Do-Hui, Jeong Mi, Kim Mi-Ja, and Choi Seon-Hyeong (KOR)	1:49.97	QS
Heat 2
1.	Erika Géczi, Erika Mészáros, Éva Rakusz, and Rita Kőbán (HUN)	1:36.48	QF
2.	Vanja Gesheva, Diana Paliiska, Ogniana Petkova, and Borislava Ivanova (BUL)	1:39.40	QF
3.	Yvonne Knudsen, Susanne Sangaard Petersen, Jeanette Knudsen, and Birgitte Froberg (DEN)	1:40.87	QF
4.	Bożena Ksiąźek, Elżbieta Urbańczyk, Jolanta Łukaszewicz, and Katarzyna Weiss (POL)	1:41.07	QS
5.	Josefa Idem, Claudia Österheld, Andrea Martin, and Ruth Domgörgen (FRG)	1:43.43	QS
6.	Angela Dawson, Janine Lawler, Susie Perret, and Andrea Dallaway (GBR)	1:46.68	QS

=== Semifinal ===
The top three finishers in the semifinal (raced on September 29) advanced to the final.

Semifinal
1.	Josefa Idem, Claudia Österheld, Andrea Martin, and Ruth Domgörgen (FRG)	1:42.09	QF
2.	Bożena Ksiąźek, Elżbieta Urbańczyk, Jolanta Łukaszewicz, and Katarzyna Weiss (POL)	1:42.55	QF
3.	Traci Phillips, Shelia Conover, Cathy Marino-Geers, and Shirley Dery-Batlik (USA)	1:43.17	QF
4.	Nancy Olmsted, Barbara Olmsted, Caroline Brunet, and Sheila Taylor (CAN)	1:43.63
5.	Angela Dawson, Janine Lawler, Susie Perret, and Andrea Dallaway (GBR)	1:46.18
6.	Sylvie Cuvilly, Claudine LeRoux, Virginie Vandamme, and Béatrice Basson (FRA)	1:47.71
7.	Lee Do-Hui, Jeong Mi, Kim Mi-Ja, and Choi Seon-Hyeong (KOR)	1:51.16

South Korea's intermediate time was not listed in the official report.

=== Final ===
A final was held on October 1.

Gold	Birgit Schmidt, Anke Nothnagel, Ramona Portwich, and Heike Singer (GDR)	1:40.78
Silver	Erika Géczi, Erika Mészáros, Éva Rakusz, and Rita Kőbán (HUN)	1:41.88
Bronze	Vanja Gesheva, Diana Paliiska, Ogniana Petkova, and Borislava Ivanova (BUL)	1:42.63
4.	Irina Salomykova, Irina Khmelevskaya, Aleksandra Apanovich, and Nadezhda Kovalevich (URS)	1:44.26
5.	Josefa Idem, Claudia Österheld, Andrea Martin, and Ruth Domgörgen (FRG)	1:45.62
6.	Anna Olsson, Agneta Andersson, Susanne Wiberg, and Liselotte Olsson (SWE)	1:45.67
7.	Yvonne Knudsen, Susanne Sangaard Petersen, Jeanette Knudsen, and Birgitte Froberg (DEN)	1:47.10
8.	Bożena Ksiąźek, Elżbieta Urbańczyk, Jolanta Łukaszewicz, and Katarzyna Weiss (POL)	1:47.40
9.	Traci Phillips, Shelia Conover, Cathy Marino-Geers, and Shirley Dery-Batlik (USA)	1:47.94
