= Canoeing at the 1988 Summer Olympics – Women's K-2 500 metres =

The women's K-2 500 metres event was a pairs kayaking event conducted as part of the Canoeing at the 1988 Summer Olympics program.

== Medalists ==
Gold	Silver	Bronze
Birgit Schmidt and Anke Nothnagel (GDR)	Vanja Gesheva and Diana Paliiska (BUL)	Annemiek Derckx and Annemarie Cox (NED)

== Results ==
=== Heats ===
15 crews entered in two heats on September 26. The top three finishers from each of the heats advanced directly to the semifinals while the remaining nine teams were relegated to the repechages.

Heat 1
1.	Vanja Gesheva and Diana Paliiska (BUL)	1:44.52	QS
2.	Birgit Schmidt and Anke Nothnagel (GDR)	1:45.53	QS
3.	Erika Mészáros and Éva Rakusz (HUN)	1:46.54	QS
4.	Irina Salomykova and Irina Khmelevskaya (URS)	1:47.30	QR
5.	Anna Olsson and Agneta Andersson (SWE)	1:52.82	QR
6.	Claudia Österheld and Andrea Martin (FRG)	1:55.25	QR
7.	Janine Lawler and Elizabeth Sharman (GBR)	1:58.90	QR
8.	Corina Martín and Verónica Arbo (ARG)	1:59.38	QR
Heat 2
1.	Annemiek Derckx and Annemarie Cox (NED)	1:46.65	QS
2.	Shelia Conover and Cathy Marino-Geers (USA)	1:50.54	QS
3.	Bożena Ksiąźek and Jolanta Łukaszewicz (POL)	1:51.55	QS
4.	Barbara Olmsted and Sheila Taylor (CAN)	1:52.45	QR
5.	Jeanette Knudsen and Birgitte Froberg (DEN)	1:55.33	QR
6.	Lee Do-Hui and Choi Seon-Hyeong (KOR)	1:57.10	QR
7.	Harumi Nakazato and Miyuki Kobayashi (JPN)	1:57.34	QR

=== Repechages ===
Two repechages took place on September 26. The top three finishers from each repechage advanced directly to the semifinals.

Repechage 1
1.	Irina Salomykova and Irina Khmelevskaya (URS)	1:49.81	QS
2.	Jeanette Knudsen and Birgitte Froberg (DEN)	1:53.30	QS
3.	Claudia Österheld and Andrea Martin (FRG)	1:56.02	QS
4.	Harumi Nakazato and Miyuki Kobayashi (JPN)	1:58.99
5.	Corina Martín and Verónica Arbo (ARG)	2:04.72
Repechage 2
1.	Anna Olsson and Agneta Andersson (SWE)	1:53.17	QS
2.	Barbara Olmsted and Sheila Taylor (CAN)	1:50.54	QS
3.	Janine Lawler and Elizabeth Sharman (GBR)	1:57.82	QS
4.	Lee Do-Hui and Choi Seon-Hyeong (KOR)	2:00.34

=== Semifinals ===
The top three finishers in each semifinal (raced on September 28) advanced to the final.

Semifinal 1
1.	Anna Olsson and Agneta Andersson (SWE)	1:51.41	QF
2.	Vanja Gesheva and Diana Paliiska (BUL)	1:52.48	QF
3.	Bożena Ksiąźek and Jolanta Łukaszewicz (POL)	1:54.30	QF
4.	Claudia Österheld and Andrea Martin (FRG)	1:55.37
Semifinal 2
1.	Erika Mészáros and Éva Rakusz (HUN)	1:48.94	QF
2.	Annemiek Derckx and Annemarie Cox (NED)	1:50.24	QF
3.	Barbara Olmsted and Sheila Taylor (CAN)	1:52.62	QF
4.	Jeanette Knudsen and Birgitte Froberg (DEN)	1:53.37
Semifinal 3
1.	Birgit Schmidt and Anke Nothnagel (GDR)	1:46.62	QF
2.	Irina Salomykova and Irina Khmelevskaya (URS)	1:49.55	QF
3.	Shelia Conover and Cathy Marino-Geers (USA)	1:54.16	QF
4.	Janine Lawler and Elizabeth Sharman (GBR)	1:58.70

=== Final ===
The final was held on September 30.

Gold	Birgit Schmidt and Anke Nothnagel (GDR)	1:43.46
Silver	Vanja Gesheva and Diana Paliiska (BUL)	1:44.06
Bronze	Annemiek Derckx and Annemarie Cox (NED)	1:46.00
4.	Erika Mészáros and Éva Rakusz (HUN)	1:46.58
5.	Irina Salomykova and Irina Khmelevskaya (URS)	1:47.68
6.	Anna Olsson and Agneta Andersson (SWE)	1:48.39
7.	Shelia Conover and Cathy Marino-Geers (USA)	1:50.33
8.	Barbara Olmsted and Sheila Taylor (CAN)	1:51.03
9.	Bożena Ksiąźek and Jolanta Łukaszewicz (POL)	1:51.13
