= Canoeing at the 1987 Pan American Games – Women's K-4 500 metres =

Women's K-4 500 metres at the 1987 Pan American Games
- Venue: Eagle Creek Park
- Dates: 9 August
- Competitors: 16 from 4 nations
- Winning time: 1.43.87

Medalists
Gold medal	Sheila Conover; Shirley Dery-Batlik; Traci Phillips; Jojo Toeppner	United States
Silver medal	Louise Hine; Erika Revesz; Cindy Leonard; Alexandra Rubinger	Canada
Bronze medal	Paula Grisel Rivas; Elisa Zaldívar; Vilma Lao; Belkis Martínez	Cuba

The women's K-4 500 metres canoeing event at the 1987 Pan American Games was held at the Eagle Creek Park in Indianapolis.

== Results ==
=== Final ===
Rank	Athletes	Country	Time	Notes
1st place, gold medalist(s)	Sheila Conover; Shirley Dery-Batlik; Traci Phillips; Jojo Toeppner	United States	1.43.87	
2nd place, silver medalist(s)	Louise Hine; Erika Revesz; Cindy Leonard; Alexandra Rubinger	Canada	1.47.36	
3rd place, bronze medalist(s)	Paula Grisel Rivas; Elisa Zaldívar; Vilma Lao; Belkis Martínez	Cuba	1.47.97	
4	Verónica Arbo; Ana Navarro; María Miliauro; Corina Martín	Argentina	1.50.01	
