= Coucke =

Coucke is a Flemish surname. Variant spellings include Coeke, Coeck, Couck, and Koeck; it may also be seen in the genitive forms Coeckx and Koeken. The surname was first recorded in the 14th century; it is an occupational surname for a maker of cakes (i.e. a pastry chef).

== People with the surname ==
Coeck

- Ludo Coeck (1955–1985), Belgian football player
- Inge Coeck (born 1965), Belgian sprint canoer

Coecke

- Pieter Coecke van Aelst (1502–1550), Flemish painter
- Bob Coecke (born 1968), Belgian-born British physicist

Couck

- Lize Marke (born Liliane Couck, 1936), Belgian singer

Coucke

- Jan Coucke (c. 1812–1860), Flemish victim of judicial error
- Valerius Coucke (1888–1951), Belgian scholar and priest
- René Coucke (1938–2016), Belgian painter and sculptor
- Marc Coucke (born 1965), Belgian businessman
- Maëva Coucke (born 1994), Miss France 2018
