= Pashovo =

- Village
- Location within Bulgaria
- Coordinates: 41°50′N 26°23′E
- Country: Bulgaria
- Province: Haskovo Province
- Municipality: Svilengrad
- Time zone: UTC+2 (EET)
  - Summer (DST): UTC+3 (EEST)

== Overview ==
Pashovo (Пашово) is a rural village in the municipality of Svilengrad, located in Haskovo Province, in southern Bulgaria. Situated in the immediate vicinity of the Bulgaria–Turkey border, the village's history has been defined by transformations from an Ottoman Empire-era trading hub to an isolated border outpost on the outskirts of the Schengen Area.

== Geography and Demographics ==
Pashovo lies 12 kilometers (7.5 mi) west of Svilengrad and 80 kilometers (50 mi) southeast of Haskovo. The village sits north of the Maritsa river valley. In line with regional trends, Pashovo has faced severe Depopulation since 1989, leaving a small, predominantly elderly population with males from the village called a Pashovets (Пашовец), female called Pashovka (Пашовка), and the plural being Pashovtsi (Пашовци).

== History ==
During Ottoman rule, Pashovo prospered as an agricultural trade node on the caravan routes to Constantinople and Edirne.

Following the Balkan Wars and World War I, the village was annexed by the Kingdom of Bulgaria. The resulting border changes permanently severed its historic trade connections, causing a steep economic decline and isolation, similar to that of its neighboring town Shtit. This decline worsened during the Cold War due to strict border security along the Iron Curtain.

In the modern day, Pashovo's significance is purely strategic. Due to its position on the external land bourdary of the European Union, the area is heavily monitored by the Bulgarian Border Police and Frontex to secure the border zone

== See also ==
- Svilengrad
- Shtit
- Border Police (Bulgaria)
