= Cebanu =

Cebanu is a surname. Notable persons with the surname include:

- Ilie Cebanu, Moldovan footballer, son of Pavel
- Ion Cebanu, Moldovan politician, Minister of Youth and Sports
- Pavel Cebanu, president of Moldovan Football Federation, footballer and football manager

== See also ==
- Cioban
- Ciobanu
