= Monica De Coninck =

Belgian politician

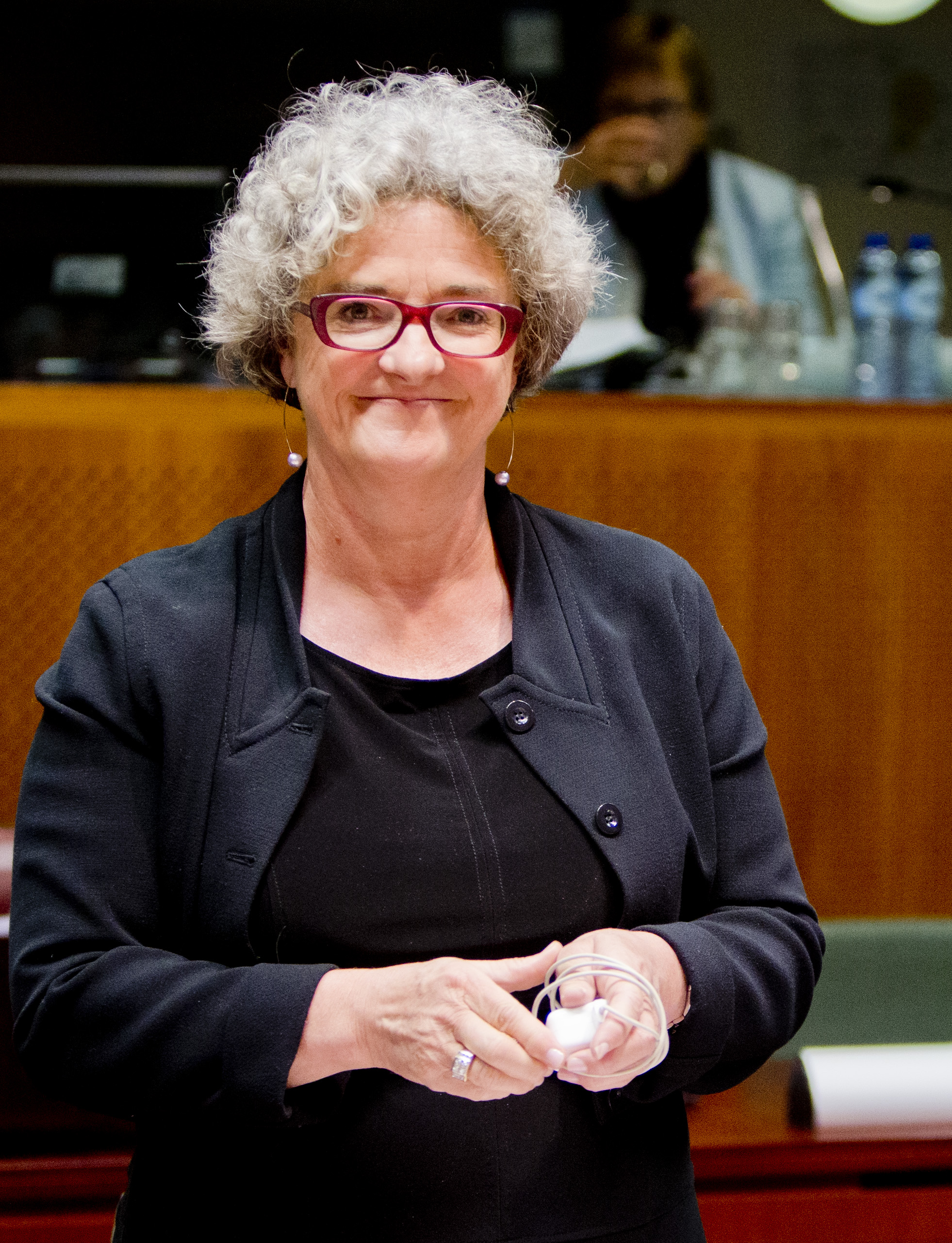
- Monica De Coninck (2014)

Personal details
- Born: 21 March 1956 (age 69); Ostend, Belgium
- Political party: Socialistische Partij Anders (sp.a)

Monica De Coninck (Ostend, 21 March 1956) is a Flemish politician for the left-wing Socialistische Partij Anders (sp.a) party. Between 6 December 2011 and October 2014 she was Minister of Labour in the Di Rupo I Government.

== Career ==
De Conink studied moral sciences at Ghent University, after which she became teacher. She taught ethics in various schools for nearly a decade. She was a teacher in Aalst, Brussels and Sint-Niklaas. From 1988 to 1994, De Coninck worked for the Socialist Youth Association (SJV).

In the 1990s she worked in the office of Leo Peeters (SP), a minister in the regional Luc Van den Brande IV government. From 1995 to 1999, De Coninck was a poverty and urban policy consultant. In August 2000, De Coninck was appointed deputy head of the Cabinet of Charles Piqué (PS), in the first government of Prime Minister Guy Verhofstadt.

From 1994 to 2001, she was in the Antwerp Provincial Council. From 2001 to 2006, she was president of the Antwerp Centre for Social Welfare. Later she was head of social policy, diversity and offices in Antwerp. In 2007 she was president of the CPAS once again.

In December 2011, De Coninck succeeded Joëlle Milquet (CDH) as Minister of Labour.
