= Chernodab =

- Village
- Location within Bulgaria
- Coordinates: 41.7669°N 26.2828°E
- Country: Bulgaria
- Province: Haskovo Province
- Municipality: Svilengrad
- Time zone: UTC+2 (EET)
  - Summer (DST): UTC+3 (EEST)

Chernodab is a village in the municipality of Svilengrad, in Haskovo Province, in southern Bulgaria.
