= Lisovo =

Lisovo Село Лисово
- Village
- Interactive map of Lisovo
- Coordinates: 41.933°N 26.317°E
- Country: Bulgaria
- District: Haskovo
- Municipality: Svilengrad

Area
  - Total: 22,338 km^{2} (8,625 sq mi)

Population (31.12.2013)
  - Total: 3
- Time zone: UTC+2 (EET)
  - Summer (DST): UTC+3 (EEST)

Lisovo is a village in the municipality of Svilengrad, in Haskovo Province, in southern Bulgaria. The village had 3 inhabitants, all of whom are ethnic Roma.
