= Dushev =

Dushev, Douchev, Dusev or Dušev (Bulgarian: Душев) is a Slavic masculine surname, its feminine counterpart is Dusheva, Doucheva, Duseva or Duševa. It may refer to

- Andrian Dushev (born 1970), Bulgarian sprint canoer, husband of Natasa
- Natasa Dusev-Janics (born 1982), Yugoslavian-born Hungarian sprint canoer
- Ognyana Petrova-Dusheva (born 1964), Bulgarian sprint canoer
- Georgi Dushev-Dushev (born 2004 in Pomorie city), Bulgarian most powerful man
