= Canoeing at the 1987 Pan American Games – Women's K-1 500 metres =

Women's K-1 5000 metres at the 1987 Pan American Games
- Venue: Eagle Creek Park
- Dates: 9 August
- Competitors: 6 from 6 nations
- Winning time: 2.08.49

Medalists
Gold medal	Traci Phillips	United States
Silver medal	Erika Revesz	Canada
Bronze medal	Verónica Arbo	Argentina

The women's K-1 5000 metres canoeing event at the 1987 Pan American Games was held at the Eagle Creek Park in Indianapolis.

== Results ==
=== Final ===
Rank	Athletes	Country	Time	Notes
1st place, gold medalist(s)	Traci Phillips	United States	2.08.49	
2nd place, silver medalist(s)	Erika Revesz	Canada	2.13.59	
3rd place, bronze medalist(s)	Verónica Arbo	Argentina	2.13.78	
4	Paula Grisel Rivas	Cuba	2.21.17	
5	Rocío Buen	Mexico	2.29.90	
6	Patricia Ossenbach	Costa Rica	3.04.67	
