= Coban =

Coban may refer to:

- Cobán, the capital of the department of Alta Verapaz in central Guatemala
- Cobán Athletic, an association football club based in Jesús de Otoro, Honduras
- Çoban (disambiguation), Turkish name
- Self-adhering bandage, also known by its eponym Coban
