= Do-hee (name) =

- Hangul: 도희
- RR: Dohui
- MR: Tohŭi

Do-hee, also spelled Do-hui, is a Korean given name.

People with this name include:

- Lee Do-hui (born 1971), South Korean sprint canoer
- Jenn Im (born Jennifer Dohee Im, 1990), American fashion video blogger
- Min Do-hee (born 1994), South Korean singer and actress
- Han Do-hee (born 1994), South Korean ice hockey player
- Noh Do-hee (born 1995), South Korean short track speed skater

Fictional characters with this name include:

- Jin Do-hee, in 2009 South Korean television series Hero
- Yoon Do-hee, in 2011 South Korean television series Dangerous Woman
- Sung Do-hee, in 2012 South Korean television series Feast of the Gods
- Na Do-hee, in 2013 South Korean television series Ugly Alert
- Sun Do-hee, in 2014 South Korean film A Girl at My Door
- Baek Do-hee, in 2016 South Korean television series The Promise
- Woo Do-hee, in 2020 South Korean television series Dinner Mate
- Do Do-hee, in 2023 South Korean television series My Demon

== See also ==
- List of Korean given names
