= Kim Mi-ja =

South Korean canoeist (born 1967)

Kim Mi-Ja (born August 21, 1967) is a South Korean sprint canoer who competed in the late 1980s. At the 1988 Summer Olympics in Seoul, she was eliminated in the semifinals of both the K-1 500 m and the K-4 500 m events.
