= Susanne Sangaard Petersen =

Danish canoeist (born 1959)

Helga Susanne Sanggaard Petersen (born December 7, 1959, in Roskilde) is a Danish sprint canoer who competed in the late 1980s. She finished seventh in the K-4 500 m event at the 1988 Summer Olympics in Seoul.
