= Susie Perrett =

British sprint canoer (born 1967)

Susie Perrett (born 30 September 1967) is a British canoe sprinter who competed in the late 1980s. At the 1988 Summer Olympics in Seoul, she was eliminated in the semifinals of both the K-1 500 m and the K-4 500 m events.
