= Diana Paliiska =

Bulgarian sprint canoer (born 1966)

Medal record

Women's canoe sprint

Olympic Games
Silver medal – second place	1988 Seoul	K-2 500 m
Bronze medal – third place	1988 Seoul	K-4 500 m

World Championships
Bronze medal – third place	1986 Montreal	K-2 500 m

Diana Paliiska (Bulgarian: Диана Палийска, born 20 August 1966) is a Bulgarian sprint canoeist who competed in the late 1980s. She won two medals at the 1988 Summer Olympics in Seoul with a silver in the K-2 500 m and a bronze in the K-4 500 m events.

Paliiska also won a bronze medal in the K-2 500 m event at the 1986 ICF Canoe Sprint World Championships in Montreal.
