= Sylvie Cuvilly =

French canoeist (born 1965)

Sylvie Cuvilly (born January 10, 1965, in Arras) is a French sprint canoer who competed in the late 1980s. She was eliminated in the semifinals of the K-4 500 m event at the 1988 Summer Olympics in Seoul.
