= Liselotte Olsson =

Swedish sprint canoer (born 1968)

Liselotte Olsson (sometimes listed as Liselotte Ohlson, born 29 May 1968) is a Swedish sprint canoeist who competed in the late 1980s. She finished sixth in the K-4 500 m event at the 1988 Summer Olympics in Seoul.
