= Hristo Atanassov =

Bulgarian politician (born 1965)

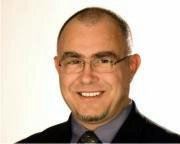

Chairman of Libertas Bulgaria

Personal details
- Born: 29 August 1965 (age 61) Svilengrad, Bulgaria
- Party: Libertas Bulgaria
- Children: Joanna, Maria, Cyril

Hristo Ivanov Atanassov (born August 29, 1965) is a Bulgarian politician and chairman of the National Council of the political party Libertas Bulgaria (LB). Hristo Atanasov is a Member of the Parliament in 36th (1991–1994) National Assembly of Republic of Bulgaria.

== Life and politics ==
Hristo Atanassov was born in the town of Svilengrad, Bulgaria. Son of Ivan Atanassov Ivanov and Kichka Hristova Ivanova, has a brother - Atanas. In 1990, became Master in History in Veliko Turnovo University St. Cyril and St. Methodius. In 1999–2001, should the second degree in International Economic Relations in the University of National and World Economic. In January 1990, as a student, initiated the restoration of People's Liberal Party (Stefan Stambolov) and was elected spokesman and representative. In elections in 1991 was elected Member of Bulgarian Parliament from Veliko Tarnovo region and became a member of the coalition PSSD (Parliamentary Union for Social Democracy) in the 36th National Assembly of Bulgaria. In 1995 - 1998 was an employee at the Ministry of Defence initially (1995–1997) is referrer responsible for bilateral military cooperation with United Kingdom and the countries of Northern Europe, and subsequently chief expert in the direction NATO. In 1995, despite the reluctance of people from the government of Zhan Videnov, was able to prepare and to conclude an agreement on bilateral military cooperation with United Kingdom, to arrange a visit to the British defense minister in Bulgaria and to arrange a donation of 300 computers for the needs of the Bulgarian Army. In 1998 Hristo Atanasov leave the defense ministry and established the Centre for European contacts, who leads. Issue and is editor of the Journal Evromost (EuroBridge). In 2000 Hristo Atanasov headed to private business. A company operating in its field of information technology. In 2003 launched the idea of establishing anti-corruption movement. In 2005 he established and registered Forum. TV on free speech,

== Family ==
Hristo Atanasov is married and has four children:

- Annabella (1988)
- Joanna (1990)
- Maria (1994)
- Cyril (1998)
