= Language legislation in Belgium =

Belgian legislation

Map indicating the language areas and provinces of Belgium. Provinces are marked by the thinner black lines.: Dutch-speaking / French-speaking; German-speaking / Bilingual French/Dutch; Community: / Region: Flemish / Flanders; French and Flemish / Brussels; French / Wallonia; German-speaking / Wallonia

This article outlines the legislative chronology concerning the use of official languages in Belgium.

== 1830: Freedom of languages and linguistic correction ==
A factor in the Belgian Revolution of the 1830s was the rising dominance of the Dutch language in the southern provinces of the United Kingdom of the Netherlands. A conflict arose between the citizenry of the Flemish provinces who wished to engage with the authorities in Dutch, and the largely francophone aristocracy of the southern provinces which became modern-day Belgium.

While the Belgian Constitution guaranteed "freedom of language", in practice the authorities, including government institutions such as the courts, were dominated by the French-speaking upper classes, and operated in French. This bias disadvantaged the largely Flemish North and, to a lesser degree, the Walloons of the South and the mainly German- or Luxembourgish-speaking environs of Arlon. As universal education developed in Belgium, the French language was initially the sole medium of instruction, alienating the northern half of the country. There was a similar sense of alienation in other areas such as justice, as the trial and conviction of two Flemish labourers, Jan Coucke and Pieter Goethals, in 1860 demonstrated. The pair were sentenced to death for the murder of a widow without having understood one single word of their trial, and were then found to be innocent after they were executed.

The Flemish Movement started to advocate language legislation that would recognise Dutch as an official language.

== 1873: First law on the use of languages ==
The first law on the use of languages was voted on in 1873, perhaps influenced by growing public dissent occasioned by cases such as the 1872 case of Jozef Schoep. He refused to pay a fine of 50 francs for not wanting to declare the birth of his son to the municipal administration of Molenbeek in French, only to be convicted after an appeal in Cassation. This and other cases provoked the discussions about the use of languages, and the first law on the use of languages, supported by Edward Coremans, regulated the use of languages in the courts in Flanders.

Dutch became the major language in Flanders, but oral testimony and penal action were still permitted in French.

== 1878: Second law on the use of languages ==
The second law on the use of languages in 1878 regulated the use of language in the administrations of Flanders and Brussels. Announcements to the public by government officials had to be made either in Dutch or in both languages. Correspondence with municipalities or persons would be in Dutch unless a person expressed a wish to be engaged in French, but in reality the law was hardly applied in daily life: Flemish citizens were still obliged to communicate with the administration in French, because most civil servants were monoglots who either spoke only French or refused to use the Dutch language.

== 1883: Third law on the use of languages ==
Until 1883, education in secondary schools had been entirely in French. The third law on the use of languages was voted on in order to introduce bilingual education.

== 1898: Law on Equality ==
In 1898, the Law on Equality was introduced. Dutch and French were now to be regarded as co-equal official languages but native French speakers in parliament, unwilling to learn or use Dutch, were either unable or unwilling to read the Dutch texts they were supposed to vote on. The reverse was not the case: Dutch speakers were obliged to learn French.

Nevertheless, under pressure from the general population, the law was passed, largely due to the extension of suffrage to every male citizen aged 25 and above which increased the number of Flemish voters, and the introduction of plural voting in 1893 which allowed some eligible voters to cast more than one vote.

== 1921: A bilingual nation or languages linked to a region ==
Disagreement over the country's language policy continued. Some segments of French-speaking Wallonia were concerned that current practices could result in Belgium becoming a bilingual country, with French and Dutch being recognised as official languages everywhere. This led to a proposal to split the administration in Belgium to preserve the French-speaking nature of Wallonia and to avoid the possibility that French-speaking civil servants there might have to pass a Dutch language examination.

This implied a choice: should Belgium become a bilingual country or a country with two language regions? This was expressed in two alternatives:

- Personality principle: All citizens have the freedom to address the authorities in whichever Belgian language they choose, regardless of their region of residence.
- Territoriality principle: The official language in a particular region follows restricted language boundaries, which means that all official dealings with the authorities will take place in the language of the region.

In 1921, the principle of territoriality was chosen; it was confirmed by further legislation, with landmark laws passed in 1932 and 1962.

The language areas were outlined according to the principle of the language of the majority of the population, and a provision in the 1932 law determined that a language census should be conducted every ten years: a municipality could change its linguistic status only according to the findings of the census.

This more flexible approach opened the possibility of minorities representing a minimum 30% of the local population being able to obtain services in their native, or chosen, language.

== 1962: Establishment of the language areas and facilities ==
A 1962 law determined which municipality belonged to what language area. Each Belgian municipality is restricted to one language area, of which there are four: Dutch, French, German, and the bilingual area Brussels-Capital that includes the Belgian capital city and eighteen surrounding municipalities.

From then on, modifications of the linguistic regime would be possible only after changing the law, which required a majority of each language community. In that same year, the municipality of Voeren (Fourons) went to the Dutch-speaking province of Limburg, and Comines (Komen) and Mouscron (Moeskroen) to the French-speaking province of Hainaut. These and several other municipalities obtained facilities for the minority language group.

In a municipality with a minority speaking another official language, facilities were provided for registered residents speaking that language. For example, education in an alternative official language was made available as long as sixteen or more parents requested its provision. (However a resident of a municipality has no such rights in any neighbouring municipality.)

To benefit from these facilities, they must be asked for by the person concerned. This raised the issue of whether the facilities had to be requested on each and every occasion or whether a single request conferred a blanket benefit. In 1997 the Peeters directive required that inhabitants of such municipalities must request such facilities in their chosen language on each and every occasion they want to enjoy that right. This led to a crisis in Voeren surrounding the mayor, José Happart.

Protests raised by French-speakers before the European Court of Human Rights ECtHR were mostly unsuccessful (e.g. Belgian Linguistics Case). A number of institutions, such as the Catholic University of Leuven, obtained authorisation to become bilingual.

== 1970: insertion of the language areas into the Constitution ==
In 1970, on the completion of the first state reform, four language areas were established by Article 4 of the Constitution. Since then the language affiliation of municipalities can be changed only by special law.

At the same time language communities were established, with the Flemish and French Communities being responsible for the regulation of the use of languages in their language area in the areas of administration, education, and for interactions between employers and their workforce.

== The present day ==
Currently the language used by the Belgian authorities, administration, education, businesses, and the army is determined by the courts. The constitutional right of freedom of language remains intact and absolute only in the home, leading to ongoing tensions in Brussels-Halle-Vilvoorde.

=== Railway information ===
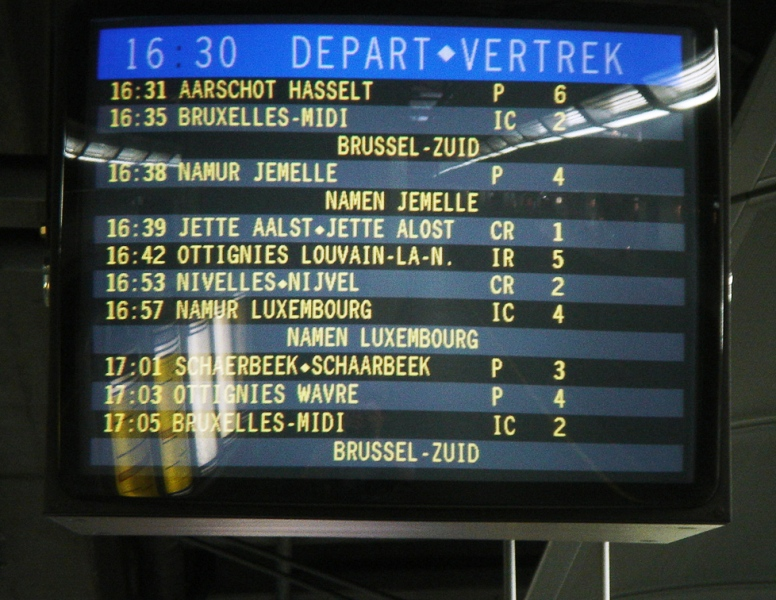
Bilingual information at a railway station in Brussels

The National Railway Company of Belgium's policy is to provide information on the train in the language of the region. For example, on a train travelling from Antwerp to Charleroi, announcements are made first in Dutch (in the Flemish Region), then in French and Dutch (in the Brussels-Capital Region), again in Dutch and finally in French in Wallonia. Station announcements at Eupen and Hergenrath, the two stations in the German-speaking community, are made in German and French (in that order). This requires rail travellers to be conversant with the name of their destination in both languages (though on-board ticket inspectors are bound to respond in either language).

In and around international stations, such as Brussels Airport, Dutch and French announcements are supplemented by announcements in German and English.

=== Road signs ===
As mentioned above, road signs are required to give destinations only in the local language, requiring travellers to recognise their ultimate and intermediate destinations in multiple languages. For example, on the Belgian portion of the E40 motorway, westbound travellers to Liège are directed to Lüttich and eastbound travellers are directed to Luik, but signs near the city itself refer only to Liège.

== See also ==
- Communities, regions and language areas of Belgium
- State reform in Belgium
- Street name controversy
- Francization of Brussels
