= Sheila Taylor =

Canadian canoeist (born 1969)

Sheila Taylor (born May 29, 1969 in Calgary) is a Canadian sprint canoer who competed in the late 1980s. At the 1988 Summer Olympics in Seoul, she finished eighth in the K-2 500 m event while being eliminated in the semifinals of the K-4 500 m event.
