= Svilengrad Municipality =

Svilengrad Municipality Община Свиленград
- Municipality
- Location within Bulgaria
- Coordinates: 41°46′N 26°12′E
- Country: Bulgaria
- Province: Haskovo
- Municipality: Svilengrad

Area
  - Total: 700.31 km^{2} (270.39 sq mi)

Population (1-Feb-2011)
  - Total: 24,480
  - Density: 34.96/km^{2} (90.54/sq mi)
- Time zone: UTC+2 (EET)
  - Summer (DST): UTC+3 (EEST)
- Website: www.svilengrad.org

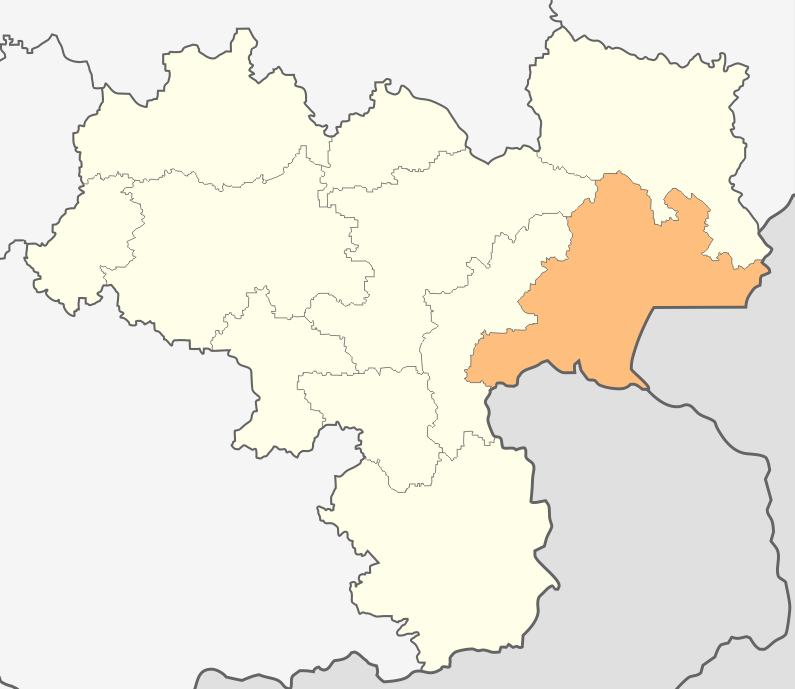
Svilengrad municipality within Haskovo Province

Svilengrad Municipality is a municipality in Haskovo Province, Bulgaria. The administrative centre is Svilengrad.

== Demography ==
=== Religion ===
According to the latest Bulgarian census of 2011, the religious composition, among those who answered the optional question on religious identification, was the following:

Religious composition of Svilengrad Municipality
Orthodox Christianity	86.2%
Catholicism	0.4%
Protestantism	0.7%
Islam	1.0%
No religion	6.9%
Prefer not to answer, others and indefinable	4.8%
