= Old Bridge, Svilengrad =

The Old Bridge Старият мост
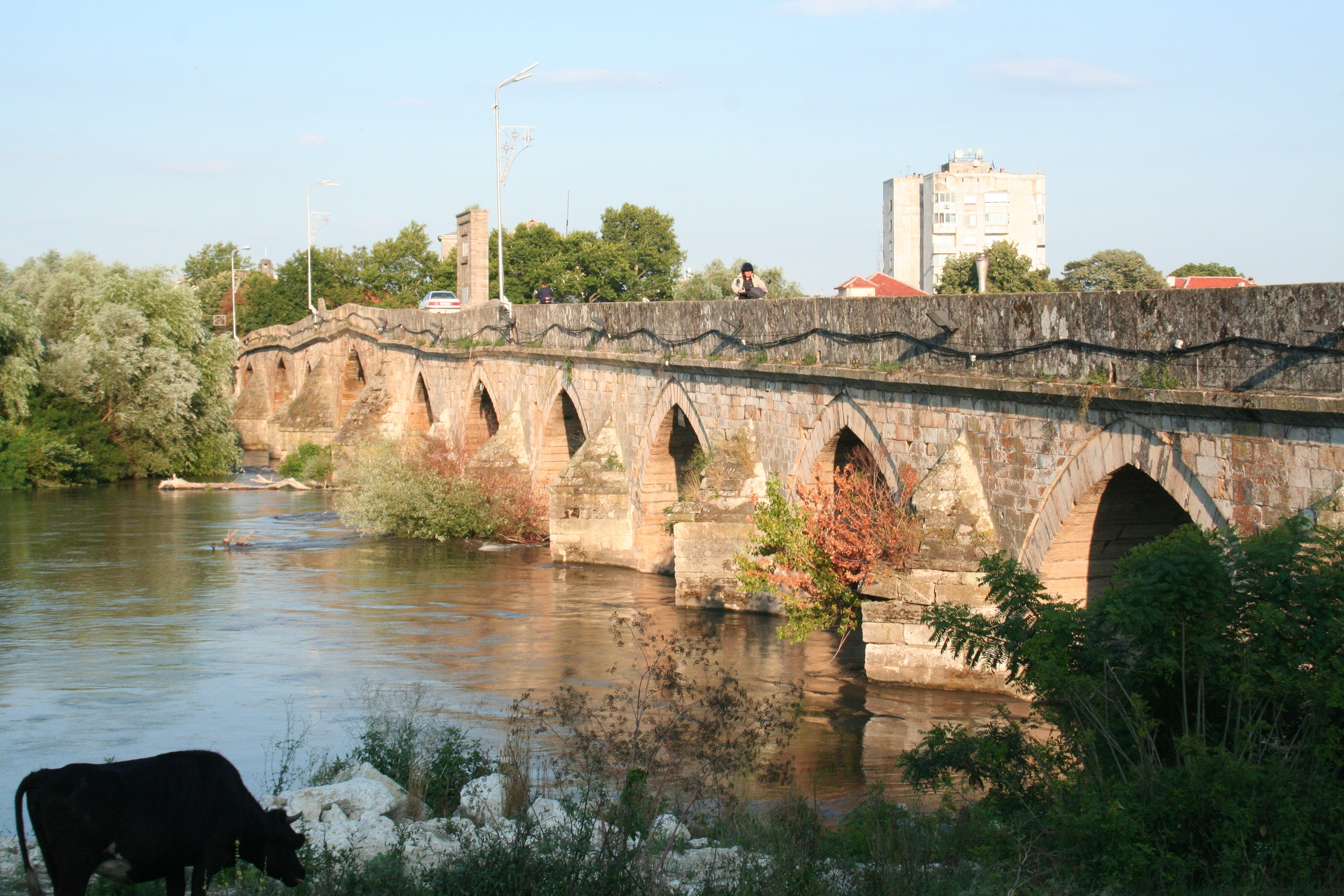
- Coordinates: 41°46′7″N 26°11′36″E
- Carries: Traffic, pedestrians
- Crosses: Maritsa river
- Locale: Svilengrad, Bulgaria

Characteristics
- Design: Arch bridge
- Total length: 295 m
- Width: 6 m
- Longest span: 18 m
- No. of spans: 20 or 21

History
- Designer: Mimar Sinan
- Constructed by: Çoban Mustafa Pasha, Sultan Suleiman I
- Opened: 1529

Mustafa Pasha Bridge (Bulgarian: Стар мост, Star most) or The Old Bridge is a 16th-century arch bridge over the Maritsa in Svilengrad, southern Bulgaria. Completed in 1529, it was built on the order of the Ottoman vizier Çoban Mustafa Pasha. The bridge was the first major work designed by the Ottoman architect Mimar Sinan, and was part of a vakıf complex that also included a caravanserai, mosque, bazaar and hamam. The bridge is 295 m long, 6 m wide and has 20 or 21 arches.

The English traveler Peter Mundy crossed the bridge on 14 May 1620, by when the neighbouring town was already known as "Mustapha Pasha Cupreesee" (Mustapha Pasha's Bridge):

From Adrianople wee came to Mustapha Pasha Cupreesee (15 miles), as much to say as the bridge of Must Pasha. Of this bridge it is thus reported for certaine, That Sultan Soliman the Magnificent haveing warrs with Hungary, att his Comeinge this way, saw the bridge, and demaundinge whoe caused it to be built, the afore named M.P. presented himselfe, sayeing hee did it. The Kinge then prayed him to bestowe it on him, where unto hee replyed that, in regard hee had built it for the good of his soule, it could not be given away. The Kinge, beinge discontented with this answere, would not passe over the Bridge att all, but sought a foorde a little above the said Bridge with his horses and followers; wherein passinge over there was drowned two of his owne Pages among the rest. Soe that it is a Custome to this day, when any Vizer or Basha hath occasion to passe this way on warfare, hee goeth not over the Bridge, but where the Kinge did passe. The rest of the Armie goe over the Bridge.

— From The Travels of Peter Mundy in Europe and Asia, 1608–1667

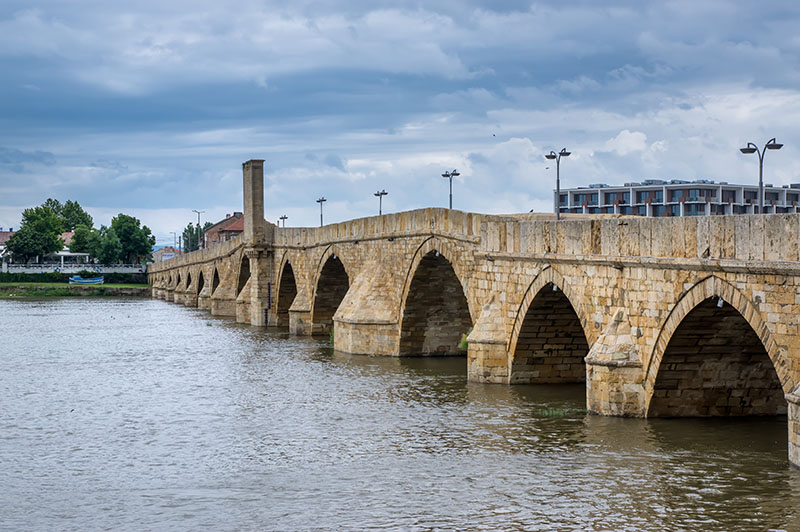
Mustafa Pasha Bridge

A flood destroyed some of the arches in 1766. Reconstruction was completed in 1809. The Ottoman army unsuccessfully attempted to destroy the bridge as it retreated from a Bulgarian advance after the Battle of Lule Burgas during the First Balkan War in November 1912.

At Mustapha Pasha, twenty miles in front of Adrianople, was a solid old stone bridge over the Maritza whose floods in the winter rains would be a nightmare to engineers who had to maintain a crossing with pontoons. If ever a corps needed a bridge second Bulgarian corps needed this one. They found that a small and badly placed charge of dynamite had merely knocked out a few stones between two of the buttresses, leaving the bridge intact enough for all the armies of Europe to pass over it; and the Turks did not even put a mitrailleuse behind sandbags in the streets or use field guns from the adjacent hills to delay the Bulgars in their crossing.

— From "The Waterloo of the Turks" in Everybody's Magazine

A plaque on the bridge has inscriptions in Bulgarian, French and English. The English text reads:

This bridge was built during Sultan Suleiman Han's time by his vezir Mustapha Pacha en 1529.

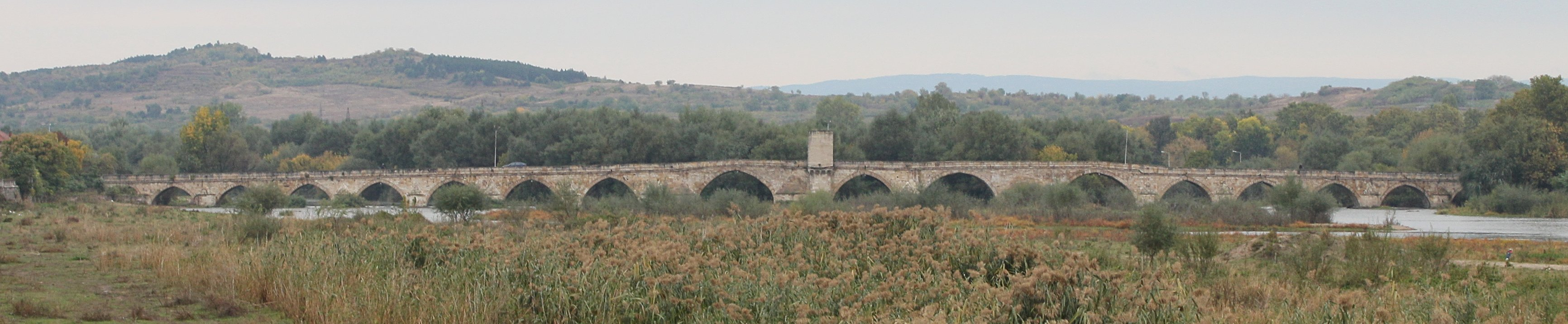
Wide view of the entire length of the bridge
