= Birgitte Froberg =

Danish sprint canoer (born 1969)

Birgitte Lyhning Froberg (born May 2, 1969 in Torsted) is a Danish sprint canoer who competed in the late 1980s. At the 1988 Summer Olympics in Seoul, she finished seventh in the K-4 500 m event while being eliminated in the semifinals of the K-2 500 m event.
