= Hana Pleskačová =

Czech sprint canoer (born 1966)

Hana Pleskačová (born 20 May 1966 in Prague) is a Czech sprint canoer who competed for Czechoslovakia in the late 1980s. At the 1988 Summer Olympics in Seoul, she was eliminated in the semifinals of the K-1 500 m event.
