= Torsted Parish, Horsens =

Parish in Horsens Municipality, Denmark

Torsted Parish Torsted Sogn
- Parish
- Interactive map of Torsted Parish
- Coordinates: 55.840°N 9.808°E
- Country: Denmark
- Region: Central Denmark
- Municipality: Horsens Municipality
- Diocese: Aarhus

Population (2025)
  - Total: 9,969
- Parish number: 7966

Torsted Parish (Danish: Torsted Sogn) is a parish in the Diocese of Aarhus in Horsens Municipality, Denmark.

Torsted is located on the southwestern outskirts of Horsens, 2 miles southwest of the city centre. Its parish number is 7966. In the Church of Denmark, it is a unit of Horsens provsti within the Diocese of Aarhus. Until the 1970 municipal reform, it was also a governmental unit as part of Hatting hundred. In 1924 it included settlements and estates named Torsted, Ørnstrup, Mosegaard and Thorstedhuse.

There is also a Torsted parish in Ringkøbing-Skjern Municipality, in western Jutland.

== Notable people ==
- Ole Sohn (born 1954 in Torsted) a Danish politician and author
- Steen Secher (born 1959 in Torsted) a Danish sailor, bronze medallist at the 1988 Summer Olympics and gold medallist at the 1992 Summer Olympics
- Birgitte Froberg (born 1969 in Torsted) a Danish sprint canoer who competed at the 1988 Summer Olympics
