= Katarzyna Weiss =

Polish canoeist (born 1970)

Katarzyna Weiss (born 9 February 1970 in Mochy) is a Polish sprint canoeist who competed in the late 1980s. She finished eighth in the K-4 500 m event at the 1988 Summer Olympics in Seoul.
