= Choi Sun-hyung =

South Korean canoeist (born 1970)

Personal information
- Born: August 29, 1970 (age 56)
- Height: 167 cm (5 ft 6 in)
- Weight: 62 kg (137 lb)
Medal record
Women's canoe sprint
Representing South Korea
Asian Games
Bronze medal – third place	1994 Hiroshima	K-1 500 m

Choi Sun-Hyung (최선형, born August 29, 1970) is a South Korean sprint canoer who competed in the late 1980s. At the 1988 Summer Olympics in Seoul, she was eliminated in the repechages of the K-2 500 m event while being eliminated in the semifinals of the K-4 500 m event.
