= Vanja Gesheva-Tsvetkova =

Bulgarian canoeist (born 1960)

Medal record

Women's canoe sprint

Olympic Games
Gold medal – first place	1988 Seoul	K-1 500 m
Silver medal – second place	1980 Moscow	K-1 500 m
Silver medal – second place	1988 Seoul	K-2 500 m
Bronze medal – third place	1988 Seoul	K-4 500 m

World Championships
Gold medal – first place	1986 Montreal	K-1 500 m
Silver medal – second place	1978 Belgrade	K-4 500 m
Silver medal – second place	1983 Tampere	K-1 500 m
Bronze medal – third place	1977 Sofia	K-2 500 m
Bronze medal – third place	1986 Montreal	K-2 500 m

Vanja Gesheva-Tsvetkova (Bulgarian: Ваня Гешева-Цветкова; born April 6, 1960) is a Bulgarian sprint canoer who competed from the late 1970s to the late 1980s. Competing in two Summer Olympics, she won four medals with one gold (1988: K-1 500 m), two silvers (1980: K-1 500 m, 1988: K-2 500 m), and one bronze (1988: K-4 500 m).

Gesheva also won five medals at the ICF Canoe Sprint World Championships with a gold (K-1 500 m: 1986), two silvers (K-1 500 m: 1983, K-4 500 m: 1978), and two bronzes (K-2 500 m: 1977, 1986).
