= Olympians for Olympians Fund =

Olympians for Olympians Fund (OORF) is a U.S. charitable fund that provides assistance to former and current U.S. Olympians facing financial hardship arising from injury, illness, disasters or other extenuating circumstances. The fund was established in 1999 by members of the United States Olympic team.

== Purpose - Sports Charity in USA ==
The United States Olympic Committee (USOC) established the Fund, which is dedicated to

(1) providing charity gifts to United States Olympians and their immediate families who demonstrate a significant need due to hardship due to illness, death or other extenuating circumstances; and
(2) carrying out those other activities which may assist US Olympic team members and their families who demonstrate need for sports charity.

== Funding - Athletes Charity ==
The Olympians for Olympians Relief Fund athletes charity is funded by through tax-deductible contributions from Olympians, former US Olympic team members, and public supporters.

== Management ==
Management of the Fund is under the control of the Board of Directors, consisting of the following former USA Olympic team members:

- Jeff Blatnick, President / Chair of the Board (Wrestling, 1980, '84)
- Cindy Stinger, Treasurer (Team Handball, 1984, '88, '92)
- Caroline Holmes, Secretary (Gymnastics, 1968)
- Reynaldo Brown (Athletics, 1968)
- John Carenza (Soccer, 1972)
- Micki King (Diving, 1968, '72)
- Cathy Marino (Canoe/Kayak, 1988, '92)
- John Naber (Swimming, 1976)
- Ed Williams (Biathlon, 1968)

Distribution of funds is made by the Grants Committee consisting of the Board of Directors of the OORF and the staff of the U.S. Olympians Association office located at the US Olympic committee headquarters in Colorado Springs, CO. Only United States Olympians, former USA Olympic teams members and their immediate family members may receive funds from the OORF.

== See also ==
- United States Olympic Committee
