= Nancy Olmsted =

Canadian kayaker

Personal information
- Born: February 25, 1966 (age 60) North Bay, Ontario, Canada

Sport
- Sport: Canoe sprint
Medal record
Representing Canada
Summer Universiade
Bronze medal – third place	1987 Zagreb	K-2 500 m

Nancy Olmsted (born February 25, 1966) is a Canadian kayaker, she competed in the Sport of Canoeing during the 1980s and during that time, represented Canada in two summer Olympic Games; 1984 in Los Angeles, United States, and 1988 in Seoul, South Korea. She was a spare in 1984 at the age of 18 and competed in the K-4 500m event with her sister Barbara and placed 10 in the 1988 Olympic Games.

Nancy was the first woman athlete to win six gold medals at the Canadian Canoe Championships in Calgary in 1983 and placed 6th in the Junior World Championships in Bydgoszcz, Poland in the K-1 500m event. She was a member of the Canadian National Canoe Team from 1983 to 1992. During that time, she represented the North Bay Canoe Club in the Canadian Championships winning over 50 National Championship medals during her canoeing career. Her best world performance was fifth in the K-2 event in 1991 and achieved a bronze medal in the K-2 event with her sister, Barbara in the World University Games in 1987 in Zagreb, Yugoslavia. In addition to this, Nancy was a varsity level cross-country skier and competed in the University circuit for 5 years and placed second in 4 of these 5 years while representing Queen's University and Nipissing University respectively. While attending Nipissing University, the women's team won the Varsity Ontario University Championships under the direction of Nordic Coach, Dave Rees. Nancy was named to the North Bay Sports Hall of Fame and was also named the Northern Ontario athlete of the year in 1983.

Olmsted is a native of North Bay, Ontario. she is the youngest of four children of Charlie and the late Joan Olmsted. She received her Bachelor of Arts specializing in Physical and Health Education from Queen's University; Bachelor of Education from Nipissing University; Bachelor of Health Sciences (Physiotherapy) from McMaster University; Master of Rehabilitation from University of Toronto; Master of Science (Rehabilitation Science) from Carleton University Sprott School of Business; and Diploma in Occupational Health and Safety from University of Fredericton.

Nancy continues to contribute to sport with public speaking and motivating young athletes to pursue their dreams. She currently is the owner and CEO of Olmsted Physiotherapy and maintains clinical practice with complex Orthopaedic cases and Sports Injuries and provides future care cost reports for personal injury lawyers. She continues to compete as a Masters level athlete in cycling and triathlons to remain fit as an older athlete. Her most recent accomplishment was completing the Grand Fondo Cycling race in Niagara Falls and placed 6th in her age category and the top 75 in a field of 1000 in all age groups. She is the team leader for the "Trail Blasers" who will be participating in the Enbridge Ride to Conquer Cancer in 2014.
