= Jolanta Łukaszewicz =

Polish canoeist

Jolanta Łukaszewicz (born 16 June 1966 in Choszczno) is a Polish sprint canoer who competed in the late 1980s. At the 1988 Summer Olympics in Seoul, she finished eighth in the K-4 500 m event and ninth in the K-2 500 m event.
