= Irina Khmelevskaya =

Soviet canoeist

Personal information
- Born: July 19, 1968 (age 58)

Sport
- Sport: Canoe sprint
Medal record
Representing Soviet Union
Summer Universiade
Bronze medal – third place	1987 Zagreb	K-1 500 m

Irina Khmelevskaya-Samoylova (born July 19, 1968) is a Soviet sprint canoer who competed in the late 1980s and early 1990s. At the 1988 Summer Olympics in Seoul, she finished fourth in the K-4 500 m event and fifth in the K-2 500 m event. Competing for the Unified Team at the 1992 Summer Olympics in Barcelona, she finished ninth in the K-4 500 m event while being eliminated in the semifinals of the K-2 500 m event.
