= Borislava Ivanova =

Bulgarian sprint canoer (born 1966)

Olympic medal record

Women's canoe sprint
Bronze medal – third place	1988 Seoul	K-4 500m

Borislava Milkova Ivanova (Bulgarian: Борислава Милкова Иванова; born 24 November 1966) is a Bulgarian sprint canoer who competed in the late 1980s. She won a bronze medal in the K-4 500 m event at the 1988 Summer Olympics in Seoul.
