= Canoeing at the 1988 Summer Olympics – Women's K-1 500 metres =

The women's K-1 500 metres event was an individual kayaking event conducted as part of the Canoeing at the 1988 Summer Olympics program.

== Medalists ==
Gold	Silver	Bronze
Vanja Gesheva (BUL)	Birgit Schmidt (GDR)	Izabela Dylewska (POL)

== Results ==
=== Heats ===
16 competitors entered in three heats on September 26, but one withdrew. The heats served as placement rounds for the semifinals that were held two days later.

Heat 1
1.	Vanja Gesheva (BUL)	1:55.44
2.	Izabela Dylewska (POL)	1:57.42
3.	Agneta Andersson (SWE)	2:00.27
4.	Susie Perrett (GBR)	2:01.97
5.	Kim Mi-Ja (KOR)	2:11.76
6.	María Miliauro (ARG)	2:12.32
Heat 2
1.	Yvonne Knudsen (DEN)	1:54.96
2.	Birgit Schmidt (GDR)	1:56.24
3.	Galina Savenko (URS)	1:56.24
4.	Traci Phillips (USA)	1:59.53
5.	Caroline Brunet (CAN)	2:00.82
-	Miyuki Kobayashi (JPN)	Did not start
Heat 3
1.	Rita Kőbán (HUN)	1:57.04
2.	Hana Pleskačová (TCH)	1:59.28
3.	Josefa Idem (FRG)	2:00.42
4.	Inge Coeck (BEL)	2:01.69

=== Semifinals ===
Three semifinals were held on September 28. The top three finishers in each semifinal advanced to the final.

Semifinal 1
1.	Birgit Schmidt (GDR)	1:55.94	QF
2.	Vanja Gesheva (BUL)	1:56.26	QF
3.	Josefa Idem (FRG)	1:59.04	QF
4.	Inge Coeck (BEL)	2:02.74
5.	Caroline Brunet (CAN)	2:08.34
Semifinal 2
1.	Yvonne Knudsen (DEN)	1:57.83	QF
2.	Agneta Andersson (SWE)	1:59.30	QF
3.	Traci Phillips (USA)	1:59.48	QF
4.	Hana Pleskačová (TCH)	1:59.95
5.	Susie Perrett (GBR)	2:04.95
Semifinal 3
1.	Izabela Dylewska (POL)	1:56.47	QF
2.	Rita Kőbán (HUN)	1:57.03	QF
3.	Galina Savenko (URS)	2:01.56	QF
4.	María Miliauro (ARG)	2:11.07
5.	Kim Mi-Ja (KOR)	2:11.99

=== Final ===
The final was held on September 30.

Gold	Vanja Gesheva (BUL)	1:55.19
Silver	Birgit Schmidt (GDR)	1:55.31
Bronze	Izabela Dylewska (POL)	1:57.38
4.	Rita Kőbán (HUN)	1:57.58
5.	Yvonne Knudsen (DEN)	1:58.80
6.	Traci Phillips (USA)	2:00.81
7.	Galina Savenko (URS)	2:00.88
8.	Agneta Andersson (SWE)	2:01.00
9.	Josefa Idem (FRG)	2:01.80

Schmidt, who won all three ICF Canoe Sprint World Championships women's kayaking events in 1981, 1982, 1983, 1985, and 1987, was an overwhelming favorite in this event but was upset by the fast-finishing Gesheva.
