= Bożena Ksiąźek =

Polish canoeist

Bożena Ksiąźek (born 6 January 1963 in Węgorzewo) is a Polish sprint canoeist who competed in the late 1980s. At the 1988 Summer Olympics in Seoul, she finished eighth in the K-4 500 m event and ninth in the K-2 500 m event.
