= Peeters directive =

Law of Belgium

The Peeters directive (Dutch: Omzendbrief-Peeters, French: Circulaire Peeters), officially Circular BA 97/22 of 16 December 1997 concerning the use of languages in municipal councils of the Dutch language area, is a circulaire of the Flemish government regulating the use of languages in municipal councils in the Flemish Region (Belgium), where the sole official language is Dutch. The directive is more in particular aimed at the municipalities with language facilities bordering the Brussels Capital-Region. It stipulates that each and every time French-speakers deal with the government, they must explicitly ask for their documents to be in French.

The circular caused national political commotion and reflects the conflicting perception of language facilities in Dutch and French-speaking public opinion. The non-appointment of three mayors of municipalities with language facilities – refused by the Flemish government because they repeatedly ignored the Peeters (and Keulen) directives – was a highly mediatised issue during the 2007–2008 Belgian government formation. It attracted international attention when the mayors took their case to the Congress of Local and Regional Authorities of the Council of Europe.

== History ==
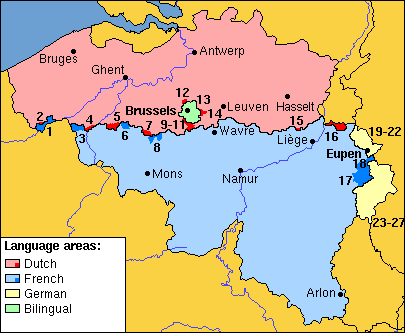
The municipalities with language facilities in Belgium. Those in Flanders, where the Peeters directive applies, are in red.

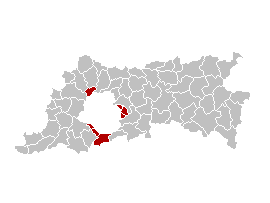
The "rim municipalities" with language facilities, around Brussels.

With the territoriality principle as the basic guideline of Belgian language politics, the language law of 28 June 1932 divided the country in the Dutch-speaking region, the French-speaking region and the German-speaking region. Brussels received a bilingual Dutch-French status. The law further stipulated that municipalities along the language border and around Brussels had to ensure a bilingual service when the minority language population exceeded 30% (so-called language facilities) and that the language of administration would be changed when this "minority" exceeded 50%. In order to estimate the number of speakers of each language, a decennial language census was established, of which the results were often contested by the Flemish.

The consensus in contemporary historical and political literature is that the results of the language census have to be interpreted with caution. The questions were alternatively on "known" languages or on the "usual" language, the most often spoken. Some considered this to refer to their mother tongue, while for others it referred to the prestigious and ubiquitous language that was French. Moreover, the censuses of 1920 and 1947 were performed in a post-war climate. Dutch, being closely related with German, was discredited due to collaborationism of certain wings of the Flemish Movement with the German occupation. French on the other hand enjoyed the status of the language of victory. Finally, given that the results had political consequences, inviting for manipulation in some cases, the census had more of a referendum on the language status of the municipality than of a sociological inquiry. In the 1947 census, more than 30% declared to speak French "exclusively or most frequently" in Wemmel, Kraainem, Drogenbos and Linkebeek, which meant that the French-speaking population of these municipalities received language facilities, whereby citizens can request to communicate with the municipal services in the language of their choice, while the official language remained the same.

The language laws of 1962–63, constitutionally entrenched in 1970, abolished the language census and fixed the language border between the language areas. All Belgian municipalities belong to one of these territories. Some municipalities went from one region to another, while others retained or were given a system of language facilities. Wezembeek-Oppem and Sint-Genesius-Rode became municipalities with language facilities. The last census in 1947 showed that the French minority in these towns was 18% and 16% respectively, but that 35% and 27% spoke French most frequently.

According to art. 7 of the 1966 law on the use of languages in the administration, the six municipalities situated in the Brussels periphery, namely Drogenbos, Kraainem, Linkebeek, Sint-Genesius-Rode, Wemmel and Wezembeek-Oppem, enjoy a "special treatment" and are called "rim municipalities". As part of the wider Francization of Brussels and a process of urbanisation, these formerly Dutch-speaking municipalities became majority French-speaking in the second half of the 20th century. This phenomenon, known in Flanders as the "oil slick", is, together with the future of Brussels, one of the most controversial topics in all of Belgian politics. All other municipalities with facilities, except for those in the German language area, plus Malmedy and Waimes, are grouped together as "language border municipalities" (art. 8).

== Legal background ==
According to a 1986 ruling of the Constitutional Court, the division in language regions entails "a restriction on the ability of legislators to regulate the use of languages and so forms the constitutional guarantee of the priority of the language of the unilingual area". The 1988 revision of the constitution (art. 129, §1) confirms that the parliaments of the French Community and the Flemish Community determine through decrees, each for their respective territory, the use of languages in administrative matters, the education system, for social contacts between the employer and his employees, and for official documents in business. However, the constitution (art. 129, §2) makes an exception for municipalities with language facilities, stating that in those municipalities the law on the use of languages for situations listed in §1 can only be changed by a law adopted by a majority in both language groups.

The Standing Commission for Linguistic Supervision is a federal institution responsible for collecting and reporting language complaints. It can give its opinion to the responsible public authorities, but its opinions are not binding. In its recommendations 26.125A, 26.033 and 23.062 (all published in 1994), the agency argued that language facilities should not lead to a generalised system of bilingualism of public services in which both languages would hold equal status. Only the regional governments can provide a supreme binding political interpretation for the language laws and the application of language facilities, which can only be annulled by the Council of State.

As a general rule, the federal government communicates with citizens in the language of the region, not in their individual language. Only in municipalities with facilities, another language can be used when so requested.

== Contents ==
=== Underlying ideas ===
The Peeters directive's recommendations for municipalities with language facilities bordering the Brussels Capital-Region and the language border, where to some extent the French-speaking population has the right to relate with the local and federal administration in French, have triggered political commotion. It stipulates these facilities, being "an exception to the rule of unilingualism of the official language areas", should be interpreted "strictly", considering their "exceptional" and "temporary" character.

The language facilities constitute the exception on the unilingualism of a language area; consequently, they thus have to be interpreted strictly. This implies that this interpretation has to be in conformity with the Constitution at all times. Therefore, the facilities cannot be interpreted that broadly that they would detract the priority of the language of the region and lead to a generalised bilingualism of administration in the municipalities with language facilities.

The directive argues language facilities have an "integrative function", meaning that, "per definition", "for the concerned individual", they have an "extinguishing character". It reads further: "The interpretation of language facilities has to take into account the possibility that a French-speaking inhabitant, who previously made use of these facilities, meanwhile knows the language of the region well enough and consequently no longer wishes to invoke the facilities". In this sense, facilities are temporary in character, and because they are temporary, they have to be applied "restrictively", implying that French-speakers have to make a new request each and every time they wish to use French in official affairs. The directive claims the "spirit in which the language laws of 1962-63 were established" is reflected in the end report of the Harmel Centre:

The Walloon community and the Flemish community have to be homogeneous. The Flemings who settle in Wallonia and the Walloons who settle in Flanders have to be absorbed by the environment. The personal element is thus sacrificed to the advantage of the territorial element. Therefore, the cultural system has to be French in Wallonia and Flemish in Flanders.

According to the directive, this quote clearly shows that the language facilities were intended to ease the transition of the minority language inhabitants to the Community to which their municipality would belong from that moment onwards.

=== Tangible changes of the existing practice ===
The most important rule introduced by the Peeters directive is that all official documents have to be sent to the citizens in Dutch. Afterwards, French-speakers can request a French translation for each separate document, on their own initiative. As for the application of documents in the town hall, all these documents have to be issued in Dutch in the municipalities along the language border, after which a translation can be requested. For the "rim municipalities" (those bordering Brussels), a French translation can be requested beforehand. Such a restrictive meaning went against the existing practice, whereby citizens had to declare their preferred language only once.

Another issue is that the Peeters directive stipulates that the language of administration and local public services should at all times be Dutch, the only official language of the concerned municipalities. It is obligatory to speak Dutch in meetings of the municipal council and the Board of Mayor and Aldermen.

== Legal challenge and controversy ==
=== On the internal language of administration ===
On the initiative of the municipality of Linkebeek, the Constitutional Court of Belgium was asked for an opinion on the constitutionality of article 23 of the law of 18 July 1966 that stipulates that the internal language of administration in the rim municipalities has to be Dutch. In its ruling 98/26 of 10 March 1998, the Court ruled this was not in violation with articles 10 and 11 of the Constitution of Belgium and that the mayor and aldermen do indeed not have the right to speak in another language than Dutch during council meetings. The Court further specified that the language facilities do not alter the principle of Dutch unilingualism of the concerned municipalities and that the Constitution guarantees the primacy of Dutch.

=== On the annulment of the circular ===
On 27 February 1998, the French Community of Belgium and the Walloon Region, together with a French-speaking inhabitant of one of the concerned rim municipalities, challenged the legitimacy of the directive before the Council of State. On 27 March 2001, the court argued that two first plaintiffs did not have any powers within the territory of the Flemish Region, and dismissed the appeal on those grounds. The case of the French-speaking inhabitant was forwarded to a Dutch-speaking chamber (since the other two plaintiffs were removed from the case, the competetent chamber changed) and debates were reopened. On 25 February 1998, the municipality of Kraainem (in the periphery of Brussels, with a French-speaking majority) had initiated another case, also requesting annulment of the directive. On 28 May, Wemmel and Wezembeek-Oppem filed for intervention, joined by Drogenbos on 28 July 2008. The municipalities (and a number of French-speaking inhabitants) claimed that the directive introduced new rules, and thus conflicted with art. 129, §2 of the Constitution.

On 23 December 2004, the Council of State decided not to nullify the directive. It argued that although the directive may have changed existing practice, it did not change the legal situation and was only to reverse the habit of municipal administrations of addressing a citizen in French without an explicit repeated request, and that the directive did not impede the use of French when wished. The court followed ruling 98/26 of the Constitutional Court, stating that the interpretation of the language law had to match the priority of Dutch; that the interpretation of the language facilities put forward by the plaintiffs did thus not apply, but would on the contrary lead to "a factual state of bilinguism whereby the language preference would even be stocked in files".

The Court's decision was received with derision by the French-speaking political parties. In a reaction of 13 January 2005, the Front Démocratique des Francophones (FDF) wrote:

The ruling of the Flemish chamber of the Council of State reveals the systematic questioning of institutional agreements sealed in the most solemn way between the two large communities of the Belgian state.

On 25 January 2005, the parliament of the French Community of Belgium ratified a "Resolution aimed to reaffirm the unswerving link between the French Community and the French-speakers of the [Brussels] periphery and Voeren":

It is in that context, in which the Flemish demands, enforced by the latest contestable rulings of the Council of State, are menacing both to the electoral district as to the status of the municipalities with facilities, that this [...] resolution to reaffirm the support and solidarity between the French-speakers of Wallonia, Brussels and those of its wider periphery and Voeren takes all its acuity.

=== On the priority of Dutch ===
On 13 October 2003, the municipality of Wezembeek-Oppem summoned the Flemish Region for its decision of 13 August 2003 to nullify its decision of 21 January 2001 to send out invitation letters for the 2003 federal elections in French to those who it assumed were French-speaking. According to the Peeters directive, these had to be issued in Dutch first after which a French translation could be requested. On 19 July 2008, the Council of State referred back to its rulings of 23 December 2004 and ruled that the Peeters directive was the only correct interpretation of the language law concerning the six rim municipalities. It argued only the Flemish government was in place of interpreting the law, that the interpretation of the Peeters directive was in conformity with the general principles of the law and that no other interpretation held legal authority. The Court refuted the argument of the plaintiff that the advice of the Standing Commission for Linguistic Supervision (to stock the language preference of citizens and directly addressing them in that language, which was explicitly forbidden by the Keulen directive) should be followed, arguing the commission had no legal authority. The Court repeated that the interpretation put forward by the municipality of Wezembeek-Oppem would in practice result in a situation of bilingualism that would be in contradiction with the priority of Dutch and the fundamental Dutch unilingualism of these municipalities.

== Legal history ==
On 16 December 1997 the directive was sent to the governors of the five Flemish provinces by the then Flemish minister of Internal Affairs, Leo Peeters. It was amended by the Martens directive of 5 May 1998 that prescribed a similar arrangement for the social services. Both directives were reconfirmed and specified by the Keulen directive of 8 July 2005, which was not well received by the French-speaking press and politicians.

== Non-appointment of mayors ==
The municipal councils of Sint-Genesius-Rode, Linkebeek, Wezembeek-Oppem and Kraainem sent out convocation letters for the 2006 provincial and municipal elections in French to the citizens of which they assumed were French-speaking. This was contrary to the Peeters directive ordering municipalities to send out documents in Dutch first, after which a French translation can be requested and the Keulen directive, prohibiting the stocking of language preference. In Flanders (contrary to Wallonia), mayors are not directly elected. Instead, after the elections, the town council nominates a candidate-mayor, who then has to be appointed by the Flemish Minister of the Interior. Marino Keulen, then minister, delayed the appointment of the four proposed mayors because they did not apply language legislation. Three of the four mayors repeated their actions for the 2007 federal elections. On 14 November 2007, the appointment of Arnold d'Oreye de Lantremange (FDF, for Kraainem), François van Hoobrouck d'Aspre (UF, for Wezembeek-Oppem) and Damien Thiéry (FDF, for Linkebeek) was officially rejected. The mayor of Sint-Genesius-Rode, Myriam Delacroix-Rolin (CDH), was appointed since she applied the language laws.

=== Congress of Local and Regional Authorities of the Council of Europe ===
Instead of challenging their non-appointment before the Council of State, the three mayors chose to bring it before the Congress of Local and Regional Authorities of the Council of Europe. On 13 and 14 May 2008, the Congress sent a fact-finding mission to Belgium to look into the situation. The delegation was led by a Frenchman and consisted further of a Serbian representative, a German expert, and two other French members of the Congress. The Council of Europe can make recommendations to its 47 member states, but it cannot impose sanctions on them for non-compliance and its conclusions are not legally binding. The mayors allowed that French was spoken during council meetings and refused to apply the recommendations of the Flemish directives. This went against the stipulations of language laws and lead to their non-appointment. Michel Guégan, president of the delegation, found that the sanction of non-appointment was disproportionate to the infractions. According to him, it hindered the normal functioning of the municipality. He also questioned why the regional authority had to appoint "democratically elected mayors". He also said that in towns with French-speaking majorities, participation of the inhabitants in local politics is complicated when the official language of administration is Dutch. The decisions of the delegation were considered ridiculous in Flanders. The Flemish Interior Minister, Marino Keulen, said they were "absurd" because they did not take into account the language legislation, the grounds on which their nomination was refused. In the European Parliament, Frieda Brepoels (N-VA) decounced "the arrogance and thoughtlessness" of the delegation. The Flemish government ignored the resolutions of the fact-finding mission, Keulen saying the acting mayors should take their case to the Council of State rather than to the Council of Europe. On 2 December 2008, the Congress voting a resolution on the issue. Of all 46 members entitled to vote, 16 were present: 14 voted in favour, the only Flemish representative voted against, and the only Dutch member abstained from voting. In the adopted resolution, the Congress urged the Belgian state to appoint the mayors and to review the language legislation in the concerned municipalities.

The Congress [...] recommends that the Belgian authorities [...] review the language laws and, in particular, the way in which they are applied in municipalities with so-called special language arrangements, to allow the use of both French and Dutch by municipal councillors and by the mayor and aldermen at the meetings of the municipal council.

Minister Keulen "took notice" of the Congress's recommendations but stressed that only the Council of State was competent to undo his decision. For the 2009 regional elections, the three acting mayors sent out French documents again. Sint-Genesius-Rode sent out convocation letters in Dutch to all citizens, accompanied by a French translation for those considered to be French-speaking.

As of February 2010, the three acting mayors are still not appointed and the Peeters, Martens and Keulen directives are still in force.
