= Cioban =

Cioban (/tʃo'ban/) is a Romanian surname meaning "shepherd". It is derived from the Persian Çoban. Notable people with the surname include:

- Denis Cioban (born 1985), Moldovan road bicycle racer
- Mitrofan Cioban (1942–2021), Moldovan mathematician
