= Claudine Le Roux =

French canoeist (born 1964)

Claudine Le Roux (born 22 November 1964 in Hennebont) is a French sprint canoer who competed in the late 1980s. She was eliminated in the semifinals of the K-4 500 m event at the 1988 Summer Olympics in Seoul.
