= Virginie Vandamme =

French canoeist (born 1966)

Virginie Vandamme (born October 19, 1966 in Arras) is a French sprint canoer who competed in the late 1980s. She was eliminated in the semifinals of the K-4 500 m event at the 1988 Summer Olympics in Seoul.
