= Canoeing at the 1987 Pan American Games – Women's K-2 500 metres =

Women's K-2 500 metres at the 1987 Pan American Games
- Venue: Eagle Creek Park
- Dates: 9 August
- Competitors: 8 from 4 nations
- Winning time: 2.00.31

Medalists
Gold medal	Shirley Dery-Batlik; Sheila Conover	United States
Silver medal	Louise Hine; Cindy Leonard	Canada
Bronze medal	Corina Martín; María Miliauro	Argentina

The women's K-2 500 metres canoeing event at the 1987 Pan American Games was held at the Eagle Creek Park in Indianapolis.

== Results ==
=== Final ===
Rank	Athletes	Country	Time	Notes
1st place, gold medalist(s)	Shirley Dery-Batlik; Sheila Conover	United States	2.00.31	
2nd place, silver medalist(s)	Louise Hine; Cindy Leonard	Canada	2.03.81	
3rd place, bronze medalist(s)	Corina Martín; María Miliauro	Argentina	2.04.53	
4	Vilma Lao; Elisa Zaldívar	Cuba	2.06.74	
