= Jeong Mi =

South Korean canoeist (born 1970)

Jeong Mi (born July 27, 1970) is a South Korean sprint canoer who competed in the late 1980s. She was eliminated in the semifinals of the K-4 500 m event at the 1988 Summer Olympics in Seoul.
