= Ruth Domgörgen =

German canoeist (born 1962)

Ruth Domgörgen (born 11 July 1962 in Bonn) is a West German canoe sprinter who competed in the late 1980s. She finished fifth in the K-4 500 m event at the 1988 Summer Olympics in Seoul.
