= Angela Dawson (canoeist) =

British sprint canoer

Personal information
- Full name: Angela Jane Dawson
- Nationality: British
- Citizenship: United Kingdom
- Born: 14 January 1968 (age 58) United Kingdom

Sport
- Country: United Kingdom
- Sport: Canoe sprint

Achievements and titles
- Olympic finals: 1988 Summer Olympics
- Updated on 14 October 2016

Angela Jane Dawson (born 14 January 1968) is a British sprint canoer who competed in the late 1980s. She was eliminated in the semifinals of the K-4 500 m event at the 1988 Summer Olympics in Seoul.
