= Çoban Mustafa Pasha =

Ottoman statesman

Çoban Mustafa Pasha (Ottoman Turkish: چوبان مصطفى باشا, "Mustafa Pasha the Shepherd"; died 1529) was an Ottoman statesman and vizier.

== Career ==
Likely born in Bosnia-Herzegovina or Serbian Sandzak, and collected through Devshirme to Janissaries, where he gradually rose through the ranks, he eventually served as kapıcıbaşı, vizier, and beylerbey for the Ottoman Empire during various parts of his life.

After serving as kapıcıbaşı ("chief gatekeeper") for some time, Mustafa was appointed a vizier in 1511 under Bayezid II, and finally beylerbey (governor) of the Egypt Eyalet (province) of the empire in 1522, serving for one year (1522–1523).

Mustafa Pasha was married to a daughter of Selim I, Şahzade Sultan With her he had at least one daughter, named Ayşe Hanımsultan. Şahzade died before 1517, but their daughter lived at least until 1556. In 1517, Mustafa was remarried to another of Selim's daughters, Hatice Sultan, full sister of Sultan Suleiman I.

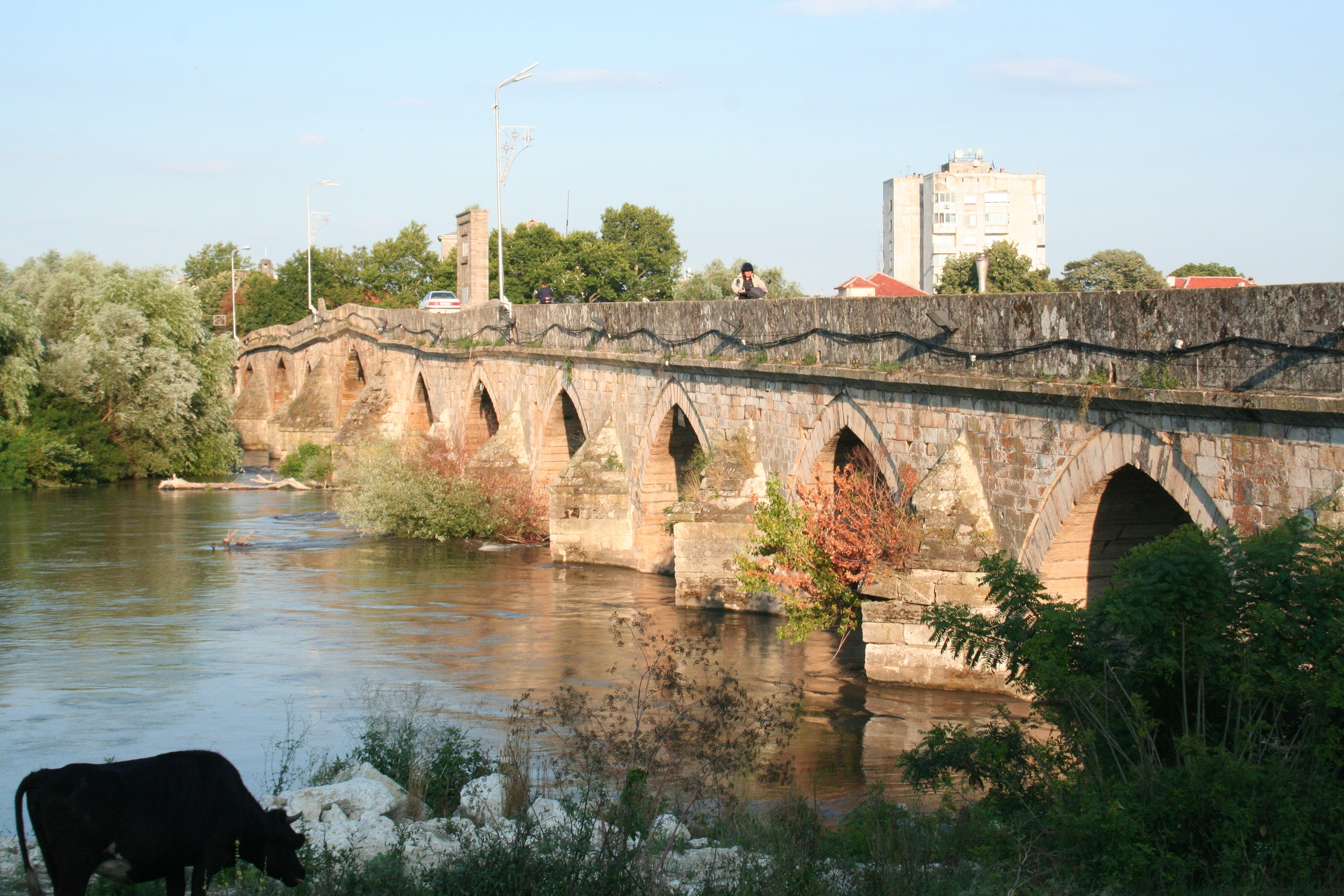
Mustafa Pasha Bridge, Svilengrad

Mustafa Pasha participated in the Siege of Belgrade in 1521 and the Siege of Rhodes the next year, both of them decisive Ottoman victories under sultan Suleiman I. During the Siege of Rhodes, he was the Serdar-ı Ekrem (the rank given to viziers in battle).

Mustafa Pasha died around April 1529 on the way to the Siege of Vienna.

== Legacy ==
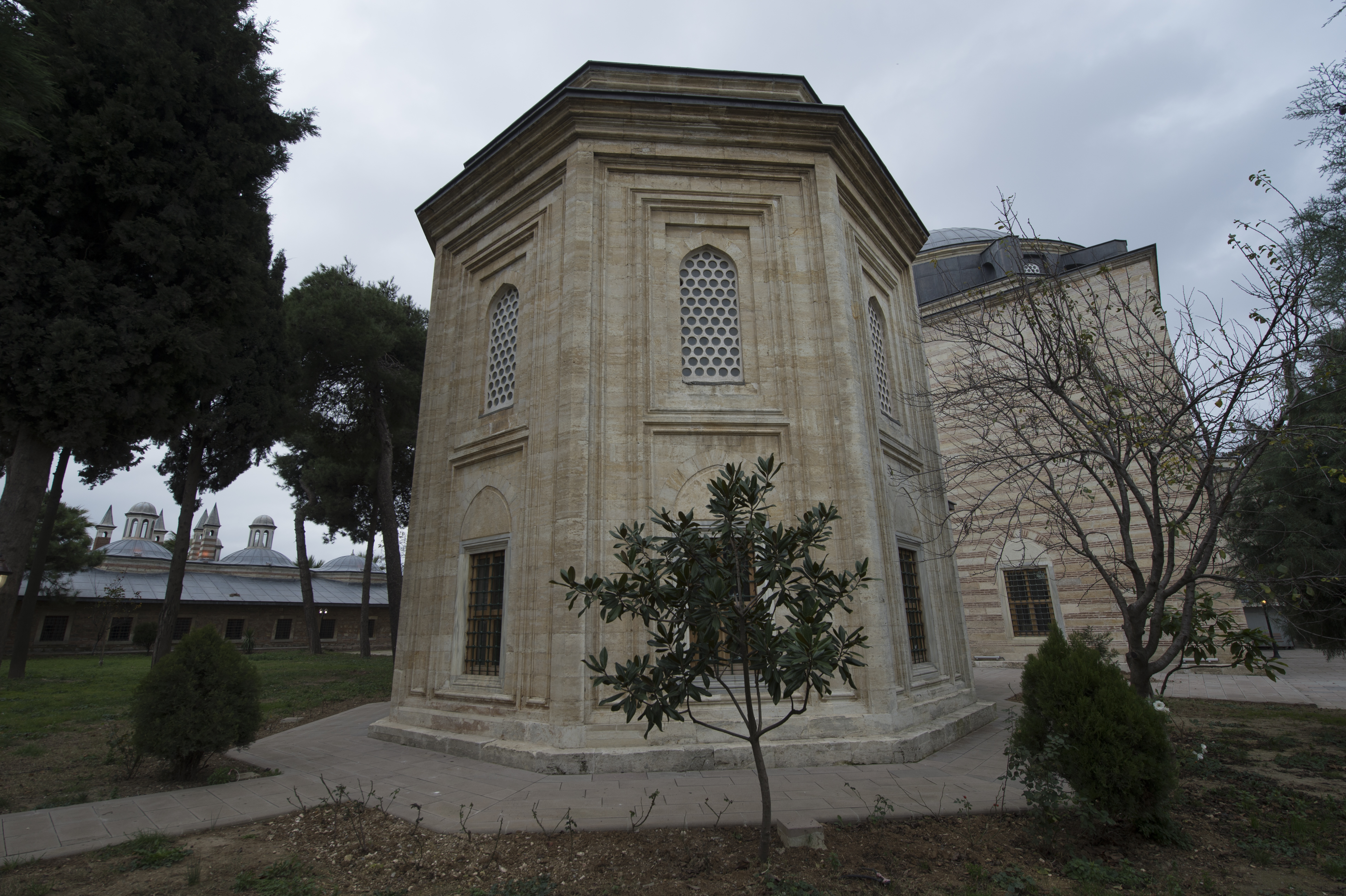
Mausoleum ("türbe") of Çoban Mustafa Paşa in Gebze

At some point, Mustafa Pasha had a bridge built in Svilengrad in southern Bulgaria, and it was named after him as Mustafa Pasha Bridge (now known as Old Bridge, Svilengrad).

Mustafa Pasha's mausoleum is in Gebze, Turkey, in a complex he had built himself and which was completed in 1522.

== See also ==
- List of Ottoman governors of Egypt

Political offices
Preceded by Hayır Bey	Ottoman Governor of Egypt; 1522–1523	Succeeded by Hain Ahmed Pasha
