= Andrea Martin (canoeist) =

West Germany sprint canoer

Andrea Martin (born 23 April 1967 in Erbach im Odenwald, Germany) is a West Germany canoe sprinter who competed in the late 1980s. At the 1988 Summer Olympics in Seoul, she finished fifth in the K-4 500 m event while being eliminated in the semifinals of the K-2 500 m event.
