= Harumi Nakazato =

Japanese sprint canoer (born 1962)

Harumi Nakazato (中里晴美, Nakazato Harumi, born June 2, 1962) is a Japanese sprint canoer who competed in the late 1980s. At the 1988 Summer Olympics in Seoul, she was eliminated in the repechages of the K-2 500m event.
