= Galina Savenko =

Soviet canoeist

Medal record

Women's canoe sprint

World Championships
Bronze medal – third place	1989 Plovdiv	K-2 500 m
Bronze medal – third place	1989 Plovdiv	K-4 500 m

Galina Savenko (March 28, 1966 – March 31, 2012) was a Soviet sprint canoer who competed from the late 1980s to the early 1990s. She won two bronze medals at the 1989 ICF Canoe Sprint World Championships in Plovdiv, earning them in the K-2 500 m and K-4 500 m events.

Savenko also competed in two Summer Olympics for two different nations. At the 1988 Summer Olympics in Seoul for the Soviet Union, she finished seventh in the K-1 500 m event. Four years later in Barcelona, Savenko competed for the Unified Team by finishing ninth in the K-4 500 m event though she was eliminated in the semifinals of the K-2 500 m event.
