= Shtit =

- Village
- Location within Bulgaria
- Coordinates: 41°49′N 26°22′E
- Country: Bulgaria
- Province: Haskovo Province
- Municipality: Svilengrad
- Time zone: UTC+2 (EET)
  - Summer (DST): UTC+3 (EEST)

Shtit is a village in the municipality of Svilengrad, in Haskovo Province, in southern Bulgaria, in close proximity to the Turkish border. Its current name (Bulgarian: Щит [ʃtit]) dates to 1934; prior to that, it was known as Skutari (Greek: Σκούταρι [ˈskutari]). The village is legally administered from Svilengrad.

== Demographics ==
According to the 2024 estimate by the Bulgarian government, Shtit had a population of 69 in 2024. Like many rural settlements in Bulgaria, the village has experienced population decline in recent decades.

== History ==
During the Ottoman period, the village was located within regional trade routes toward Constantinople.

Following the First Balkan War, Shtit and the surrounding area were absorbed into the Kingdom of Bulgaria as part of the Haskovo Province.

== Historic Sites ==
Shtit has a few historical sites near it, with two mainly of note: Firstly, the "Римска баня", or Roman Baths. Despite being called "Roman" the baths are thought to be Turkish in origin, however, there is not enough evidence to support this. The baths are thermal, making them similar to other Roman and Turkish baths found in the region.

The Крепост „Скутарион“ or "Skutarion Fortress" is the remains of a fortress located southeast of Shtit. Although only a wall remains standing, the fortress still serves as a local attraction and tourist hotspot.
