= René Coucke =

René (Pablo) Coucke (29 August 1938, in Ostend, Belgium – 19 June 2016, in Ostend) was a Flemish postimpressionistic painter and sculptor. In a career spanning over 50 years, he has produced paintings and sculptures in bronze, tin, wood and steel.

== Commissioned public works on view ==
- De Klompenmaker – Sint-Niklaas, Belgium
- Het Stilste Plekje – Eernegem, Belgium
- The Millennium Door – Valletta harbour, Malta
- De Dokwerker – Bruges, Belgium
