= María Miliauro =

Argentine sprint canoer (born 1968)

Personal information
- Full name: María de los Ángeles Miliauro
- Born: September 16, 1968 (age 58)
- Height: 1.57 m (5 ft 2 in)
- Weight: 62 kg (137 lb)
Medal record
Women's canoe sprint
Representing Argentina
Pan American Games
| Bronze medal – third place | 1987 Indianapolis | K-2 500m |

María Miliauro (born September 16, 1968) is an Argentine sprint canoer who competed in the late 1980s. At the 1988 Summer Olympics in Seoul, she was eliminated in the semifinals of the K-1 500 m event.
