= Corina Martín =

Argentine canoeist (born 1969)

Personal information
- Full name: Corina Martín García
- Born: December 19, 1969 (age 56)
- Height: 1.62 m (5 ft 4 in)
- Weight: 59 kg (130 lb)
Medal record
Women's canoe sprint
Representing Argentina
Pan American Games
Bronze medal – third place	1987 Indianapolis	K-2 500m

Corina Martín (born December 19, 1969) is an Argentine sprint canoer who competed in the late 1980s. At the 1988 Summer Olympics in Seoul, she was eliminated in the repechages of the K-2 500 m event.
