= Leo Peeters =

Belgian politician (born 1950)

Leo Albert Elisabeth Peeters (born 2 May 1950 in Kapelle-op-den-Bos) is a Flemish politician and a member of the Socialist Party Different (sp.a).

In early 1995 he became Minister of Work and Social Affairs of the Flemish Government. Later that year he also became Minister of Internal Affairs, Urban Policy and Housing. During his time in office he wrote the Peeters directive, regulating the use of languages in Dutch-speaking municipalities. After the regional elections of 1999 he resumed his function as mayor of Kapelle-op-den-Bos and also became a member of the Flemish Parliament.
