= Inge Coeck =

Belgian sprint canoer (born 1965)

Inge Coeck (Kortrijk, 21 December 1965) is a Belgian sprint canoer who competed in the late 1980s. At the 1988 Summer Olympics in Seoul, she was eliminated in the semifinals of the K-1 500 m event.
