= Jan Coucke and Pieter Goethals =

Jan Coucke (c. 1812 – 16 November 1860) and Pieter Goethals (c. 1826 – 16 November 1860) were two Flemish people who were sentenced to death for murder in 1860 at a time Belgium was legally only French-speaking, though the majority of the citizens spoke Dutch, and only the official language was acknowledged by the Courts of Justice. They became an example as well as an exponent of how the French-speaking bourgeoisie (from Wallonia but also from Flanders) treated their Flemish fellow-citizens, of whom the language – if not its speakers – was considered inferior by the elite. Later on, the real perpetrators confessed to the murder, which in 1873 led to a debate in parliament that ended in the Coremans Act, one of the first laws to recognize Dutch as an official language in Belgium, allowing the Flemish to use their own language at Flemish courts, though not yet in Brussels.

== History ==
On 23 March 1860, widow Dubois was the victim of an assault and robbery by night in Couillet near Charleroi. She was discovered in agony only the next day, and died of her injuries a few days later. To the village policeman, she had only been able to utter that her attackers spoke "Flemish". Consequently, the attention was drawn on two Flemings who had been making a living in the region, Jan Coucke, a forty-nine-year-old potato salesman born in Sint-Denijs near Kortrijk, and Pieter Goethals, a railroad worker originating from Lotenhulle and thirty-four years of age.

Their trial in French at the Assize Court of Hainaut in Mons started on 20 August 1860. Although both lived in Couillet, Wallonia, and spoke French for their work, they were assisted by a Dutch translator, Pierre Van Horenbeek.

Prosecutor Charles-Victor de Bavay obtained their death sentence five days later. They were beheaded on the Grand Market Place of Charleroi a few weeks later.

In 1861, a year after the execution, 14 members of the infamous Black Gang were to appear before the same assize court. The leader of the gang, Leopold Rabet, confessed that French-speaking gang members had killed the widow Dubois. Jean-Baptiste Boucher and Auguste Leclercq confessed to having committed the murder and were sentenced to death. They also confessed that although Coucke and Goethals did not kill the widow, they were their accomplices.

== Aftermath ==
On 18 July 2005 at the Belgian federal parliament, Filip De Man directed a series of questions at the vice-prime minister and minister of Justice, regarding the case Coucke and Goethals. His introduction stated that since 1861 there had been several attempts to officially restore the honour of Coucke and Goethals. In 2000, Johan Vande Lanotte, Siegfried Bracke and Geert Goedertier had still written (in België voor beginners. Wegwijs in het Belgisch labyrint, p. 27, die Keure, Brugge) that Coucke and Goethals were not the murderers of the widow, but were informed on the murder. In 1948, a study by the Flemish journalist Herman Bossier had concluded that there had not been a miscarriage of justice, as according to the journalist, the declaration by Rabet included errors and two other members of the Black Gang, after their trial, had talked about the Flemish as accomplices; the interpreter would not have been a gendarme from Luxembourg, but a sworn translator of Dutch origin (Nederlandse afkomst). On five occasions Goethals would have confessed and as chief railroad worker he had to know the French language, while Coucke sold vegetables to French-speaking customers and, having had money problems before the murder, thereafter had means of which he could not demonstrate the origin.

The Member of Parliament then asked whether the dossier of the trial case could be looked into by MPs or by civilians, and whether it corroborated the journalist's statements about Rabet, the interpreter, Goethals' confessions, and Coucke's financial situation. He also wished to know whether the nine death penalties of 17 January 1862 by the same court of which seven had been reduced, were connected to the Black Gang and thus to Boucher, Leclerq, and Rabet. Would the Minister of Justice in this case be willing to ask the advice of the Attorney General at the Appeal Court of Mons, and to ask for the revision of the verdict of 1869, or to provide reasons for not asking the latter.

The Minister replied one year later, on 24 July 2006. The confession of guilt by third parties can be considered as a new fact having taken place after the conviction, offering the possibility to review the case. The criticism and advises that several authors may have brought forward, do not form a ground for a revision. According to the Minister, of the mentioned elements, only the statement by Rabet form such a ground in as far it is of a nature that proves the innocence of the convicts and it has been made in circumstances giving credibility to that statement or confession. The mentioned information however, does not offer the possibility to assess the reality, the circumstances, and the reach of the declarations by Rabet. The dossier on the case can be viewed if the Attorney General at the Appeal Court of Mons gives his permission, even in case it is in the National Archives as it is over a hundred years old.

== See also ==
- Linguistic legislation in Belgium
