= Lee Do-hui =

South Korean canoeist

- Hangul: 이도희
- Hanja: 李道姬
- RR: I Dohui
- MR: I Tohŭi

Lee Do-hui (born July 15, 1971) is a South Korean sprint canoer who competed in the late 1980s. At the 1988 Summer Olympics in Seoul, she was eliminated in the repechages of the K-2 500 m event while being eliminated in the semifinals of the K-4 500 m event.
