= Claudia Österheld =

German airframe engineer

Claudia Österheld (born 8 December 1968 in Kassel) is an aircraft engineer, working at Airbus Operations GmbH. She is specialized in multidisciplinary design optimization and finite element modeling.

Österheld competed as a canoe sprinter for West Germany in her late teens. In 1988, she won the Women's K-2 500m championship with Catrin Fischer. At the 1988 Summer Olympics in Seoul, she finished fifth in the semifinals of the K-4 500 m event.
