= Cathy Marino =

American canoeist

Cathy Marino (born July 13, 1957) is a two-time American Olympic sprint canoer and 8 time USA National Champion. She competed in the late 1980s and early 1990s. Competing in two Summer Olympics, she earned her best finish of seventh (1988: K-2 500 m, 1992: K-4 500 m).

== Career ==
=== Olympic ===
Marino was a member of two straight USA Olympic Games Teams, in 1988 and 1992.

In the 1988 Summer Olympics in Seoul, Marino finished 7th in the Women's Kayak Doubles, 500 meters, and 9th in the Women's Kayak Fours, 500 meters. In the 1992 Summer Olympics in Barcelona, she finished 7th in the Women's Kayak Fours, 500 meters.

Marino served as the President of the SoCal Olympians for over 10 years, https://www.facebook.com/SoCalOly and remains an active board member. Additionally, Cathy is the Secretary on the board of directors for the Koroibos Foundation 501C3, of the Southern California Olympians, whose mission is to assist Olympic hopefuls through grants and financial aid, which assisted her in 1984.

Marino is on the board of the non-profit Olympians for Olympians Fund (OORF), created by the United States Olympic Committee. The OORF assists USA Olympians by providing monetary assistance to United States Olympic athletes who have exhausted their financial reserves in attempting to recover from accidents, natural disasters, long-term illnesses, or injuries.

=== Firefighting ===
Marino became the first female fire recruit to pass the Santa Ana College Fire Academy in 1981. She was the first female firefighter for the City of Orange, CA in May, 1981 and was hired as the first female firefighter for the City of Long Beach, California Fire Department on December 1, 1986. She was promoted to Fire captain in January 2000. She retired from injuries in 2003.

== Personal life ==
Marino is a mother to two adult children. Grandmother to 3: age 6, 1, and 2 months.

Competed in the "Original American Gladiators" TV Season 5 competition.

== See also ==
- Canoeing and kayaking at the Summer Olympics
- Olympians for Olympians Fund
- World Fit
