= Ognyana Petrova =

Bulgarian canoeist (born 1964)

Ognyana Dusheva (Ognyana Petrova)
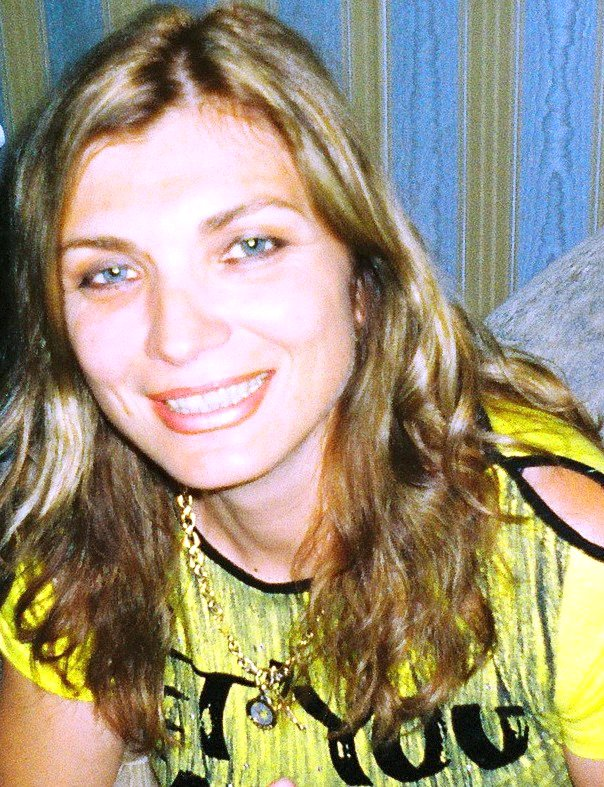

Personal information
- Born: December 20, 1964 (age 61) Svilengrad, Bulgaria

Sport
- Country: Bulgaria
Medal record
Representing Bulgaria
Women's canoe sprint
Olympic Games
Bronze medal – third place	1988 Seoul	K-4 500 m
World Championships
Bronze medal – third place	1987 Duisburg	K-2 500 m

Ognyana Georgieva Petrova – Ognyana Dusheva (née Petkova, Bulgarian: Огняна Георгиева Петрова, born December 20, 1964, in Svilengrad) is a Bulgarian sprint canoer who competed from 1976 to 1988. Petrova won a bronze medal in the K-4 500 m event at the 1988 Summer Olympics in Seoul.'

Petrova started her sports career in Plovdiv with “Trakia” Sports Club of canoe-kayak in 1976. From 1981 to 1988, she was part of the Bulgarian national team, consistently being on the six-person team at the European and World Championships. She won the K-2 500 m bronze medal at the 1987 World Championships in Duisburg, West Germany.

Petrova was nominated as one of Bulgaria's ten-best women sprint canoers in the 20th century. She also won an Olympic service medal by the Bulgarian Olympic Committee and was awarded the emblem of Plovdiv by the city's mayor. Petrova also acts as a Judge for the International Canoe Federation and serves as the PR of the Bulgarian Canoe Federation.
