= Jeanette Knudsen =

Danish canoeist

Jeanette Brandstrup Knudsen (born November 21, 1967) is a Danish sprint canoer and marathon canoeist who competed from the late 1980s to the early 1990s. She competed in two Summer Olympics, earning her best finish of seventh in the K-4 500 m event at Seoul in 1988.

Her sister, Yvonne, won two medals in the K-1 500 m event at the ICF Canoe Sprint World Championships with a silver in 1990 and a bronze in 1986. Yvonne also competed in the same two Summer Olympics as Jeanette.
