= Shirley Dery =

American sprint canoer

Personal information
- Full name: Shirley Dery-Batlik
- Born: November 17, 1961 (age 64) White Plains, New York, U.S.
- Height: 1.67 m (5 ft 6 in)
- Weight: 64 kg (141 lb)
Medal record
Women's canoe sprint
Representing the United States
Pan American Games
Gold medal – first place	1987 Indianapolis	K-2 500m
Gold medal – first place	1987 Indianapolis	K-4 500m

Shirley Dery-Batlik (born November 17, 1961, in White Plains, New York) is an American sprint canoer who competed in the mid to late 1980s. Competing in two Summer Olympics, she earned her best finish of fourth in the K-4 500 m event at Los Angeles in 1984.
