= Ciobanu =

- Commune
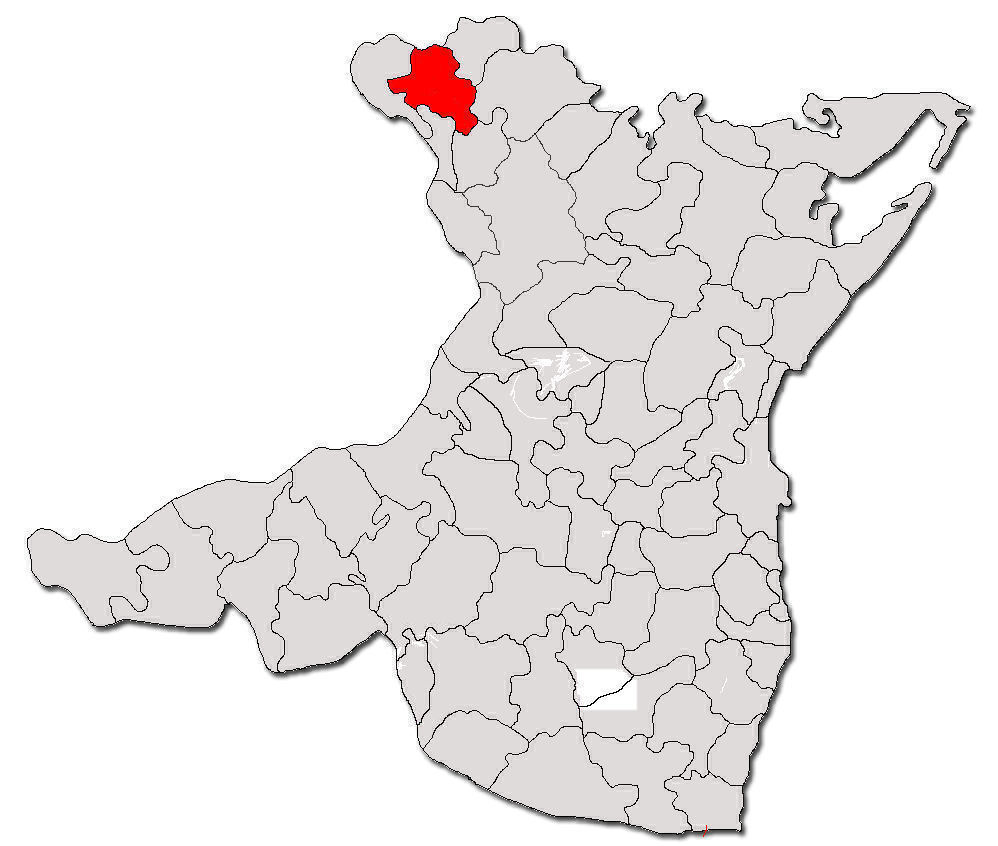
- Location in Constanța County

- Location in Romania
- Coordinates: 44°44′N 27°58′E
- Country: Romania
- County: Constanța
- Subdivisions: Ciobanu, Miorița

Government
  - Mayor (2024–2028): Tudorel Gurgu (PSD)
- Area: 91.77 km^{2} (35.43 sq mi)
- Population (2021-12-01): 3,409
  - Density: 37.15/km^{2} (96.21/sq mi)
- Time zone: UTC+02:00 (EET)
  - Summer (DST): UTC+03:00 (EEST)
- Vehicle reg.: CT
- Website: www.primariaciobanu.ro

Ciobanu (Romanian pronunciation: [t͡ʃjoˈbanu]) is a commune in Constanța County, Northern Dobruja, Romania.

The commune includes two villages:

- Ciobanu (historical name: Turkish: Çoban-Kuyusu)
- Miorița (historical names: Cadi-Câșla, Bălăceanu until 1964)

== Demographics ==
At the 2011 census, Ciobanu had 3,119 Romanians (99.84%), 5 others (0.16%).
