= Yvonne Knudsen =

Danish canoeist

Medal record

Women's canoe sprint

World Championships
Silver medal – second place	1990 Poznań	K-1 500 m
Bronze medal – third place	1986 Montreal	K-1 500 m

Yvonne Brandtrup Knudsen-Hansen (born 7 August 1964) is a Danish sprint canoeist who competed from the late 1980s to the early 1990s. She won two medals in the K-1 500 m at the ICF Canoe Sprint World Championships with a silver in 1990 and a bronze 1986.

Knudsen also competed in two Summer Olympics, earning her best finish of fifth in the K-1 500 m event at Seoul in 1988.

Her sister, Jeanette, also competed as a sprint canoer for Denmark in the Summer Olympics.
