= Verónica Arbo =

Argentine canoeist (born 1968)

Verónica Arbo (born June 4, 1968) is an Argentine sprint canoer. Arbo competed at the 1988 Summer Olympics in Seoul where she was eliminated in the repechages of the K-2 500 m event.
