= Çoban =

Çoban or Choban is a Turkish name and surname of Persian origin meaning "shepherd". It may refer to:

- Chupan or Çoban (c. 1262–1327), Mongol emir in Persia
- Ayşegül Çoban (born 1992), Turkish female weightlifter
- Bekir Çoban-zade (1893–1937), Crimean Tatar poet
- Brady Choban (born 2000), American baseball player
- Hüsamettin Çoban (13th century), commander of the Anatolian Seljuks
- Kenan Çoban (born 1975), Turkish actor
- Mehmet Çoban (1905–1969), Turkish Olympian wrestler
- Çoban Mustafa Pasha (died 1529), Ottoman statesman and governor of Egypt

== See also ==
- Çoban is the Turkish name of the Greek island of Kasos
