= Sheila Conover =

American sprint canoer (born 1963)

Personal information
- Full name: Sheila Leilehua Conover
- Born: May 11, 1963 (age 63) Brentwood, California, U.S.
- Height: 1.75 m (5 ft 9 in)
- Weight: 68 kg (150 lb)
Medal record
Women's canoe sprint
Representing the United States
Pan American Games
Gold medal – first place	1987 Indianapolis	K-2 500m
Gold medal – first place	1987 Indianapolis	K-4 500m

Sheila Leilehua Conover (born May 11, 1963) is an American sprint canoer who was born in California, who competed from the mid-1980s to the early 1990s. Competing in three Summer Olympics, she earned her best finish of fourth in the K-4 500 m event at Los Angeles in 1984.
