= Janine Lawler =

British canoeist

Janine Lawler (born 16 August 1965) is a British canoe sprinter who competed in the mid to late 1980s.

== Early life ==
She is the older sister of canoeist Ivan Lawler. She lived in Walton-on-Thames.

== Career ==
Competing in two Summer Olympics, she earned her best finish of seventh in the K-4 500 m event.
