= Barbara Olmsted =

Canadian canoeist (born 1959)

Personal information
- Born: August 17, 1959 (age 67) North Bay, Ontario, Canada

Sport
- Sport: Canoe sprint
Medal record
Representing Canada
Olympic Games
Bronze medal – third place	1984 Los Angeles	K-4 500 m
Summer Universiade
Bronze medal – third place	1987 Zagreb	K-2 500 m

Barbara Olmsted (born August 17, 1959) is a Canadian sprint kayaker who competed in the 1980s. Competing in two Summer Olympics (1984 Los Angeles and 1988 Seoul), she won a bronze medal in the K-4 500 m event at Los Angeles in 1984. Olmsted was born in North Bay, Ontario. She received her Bachelor of Arts, Bachelor of Physical Education and Bachelor of Education degrees from Queen's University, Master of Arts degree from the University of Western Ontario, and Doctor of Education degree from West Virginia University.
