= Svilengrad =

Svilengrad Свиленград
- Town
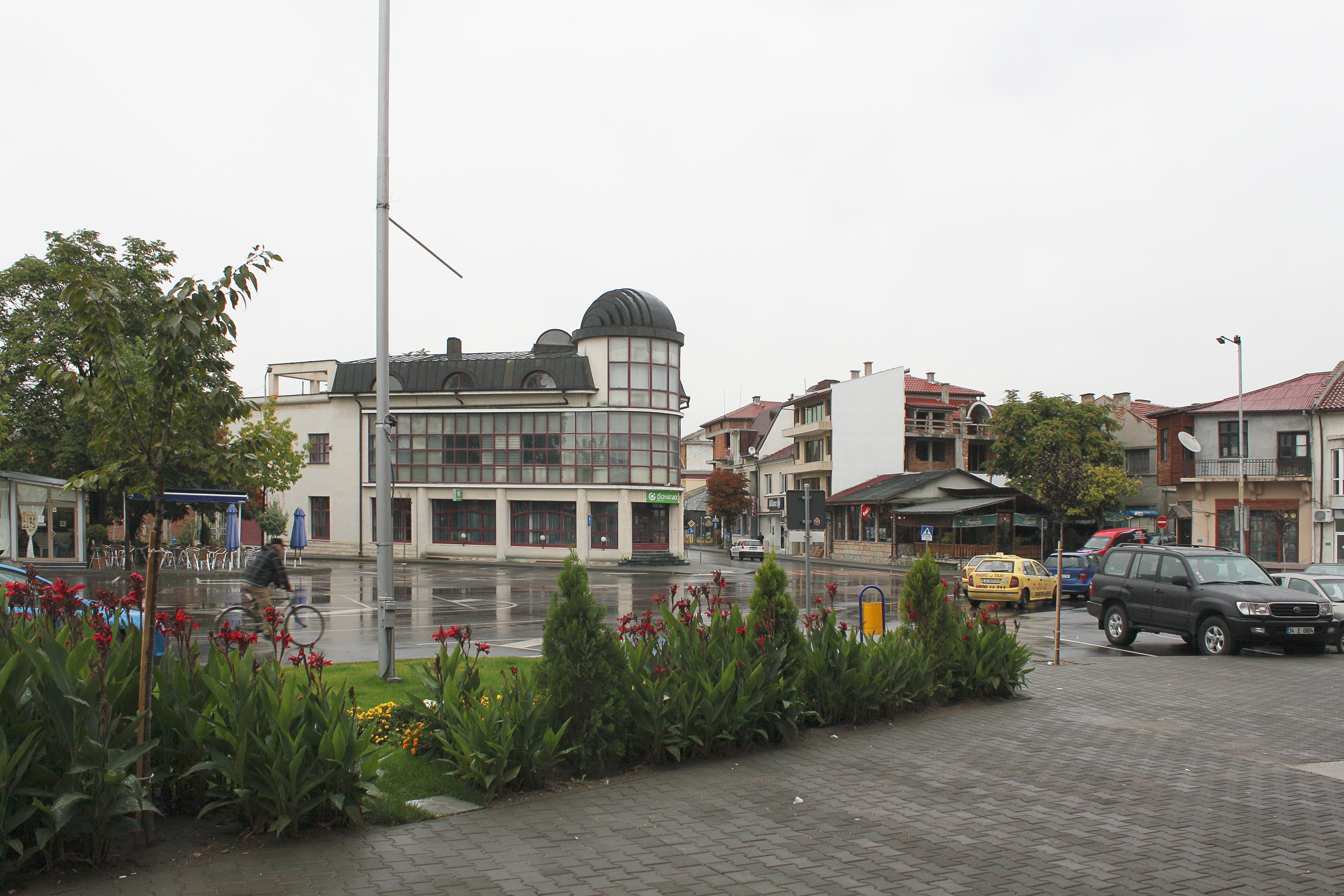

- Location within Bulgaria
- Coordinates: 41°46′N 26°12′E
- Country: Bulgaria
- Province: Haskovo
- Municipality: Svilengrad

Government
  - Mayor: Anastas Karchev

Area
  - Total: 79.686 km^{2} (30.767 sq mi)
- Elevation: 60 m (200 ft)

Population (2025)
  - Total: 16,302
  - Density: 204.58/km^{2} (529.85/sq mi)
- Time zone: UTC+2 (EET)
  - Summer (DST): UTC+3 (EEST)
- Postal code: 6500
- Area code: (+359) 0379
- Website: www.svilengrad.org

Svilengrad (Bulgarian: Свиленград; Greek: Σβίλενγκραντ; Ottoman Turkish: Cisr-i Mustafapaşa) is a town in Haskovo Province, south-central Bulgaria, situated at the tripoint of Bulgaria, Turkey, and Greece. It is the administrative centre of the homonymous Svilengrad Municipality.

Svilengrad lies on the Maritsa River in southeastern Bulgaria, close to the borders with both Greece and Turkey. The town is about 2 km (1.2 mi) north of the Greek border and 14 km (8.7 mi) northwest of the Turkish border. The Greek village of Ormenio lies to the south, while Edirne in Turkey is about 30 km to the east.

The town’s position near two international borders has strongly influenced its development. The main road and railway routes between Bulgaria and Turkey pass through the area, and customs, freight transport and other border-related services are important to the local economy. The Kapitan Andreevo border crossing, southeast of Svilengrad, is one of the principal road crossings between Bulgaria and Turkey.

Svilengrad occupies part of the broad valley of the Maritsa. The Sakar Mountains rise to the northeast, while the easternmost foothills of the Rhodope Mountains lie to the southwest. The surrounding lowlands have a relatively warm climate and are used for agriculture, including vineyards and fruit growing.

== History ==
During Ottoman rule, the town's name was Cisr-i Mustafapaşa, meaning "Bridge of Mustafa Pasha". In 1529, the Old Bridge (Bulgarian: Старият мост) over the Maritsa, one of the symbols of the town, was erected on the order of Mustafa Pasha. The town was ceded to Bulgaria in 1912 after the First Balkan War.

The favorable natural conditions in the Svilengrad region and its strategic geographical location are the reason why it has been inhabited since ancient times. According to Anastas Razboynikov, the oldest traces of human life date back to the end of the Neolithic and Stone Age. During the Bronze and Iron Ages the lands around today's Svilengrad were inhabited by the Thracian tribe Odrysians. Traces of settlements, tombs, sanctuaries, dolmens and others have remained from the time of the Thracians. In the old neighborhood of Kanaklia there was a place Mogilata, named after a large mound, in the vicinity of which were found the remains of chariots. Anastas Razboynikov's observations were confirmed in 2003-2004 during the rescue excavations along the route of the Trakia Motorway on the hill above the Kanaklia neighborhood, where a pit sanctuary from the Iron Age was discovered.

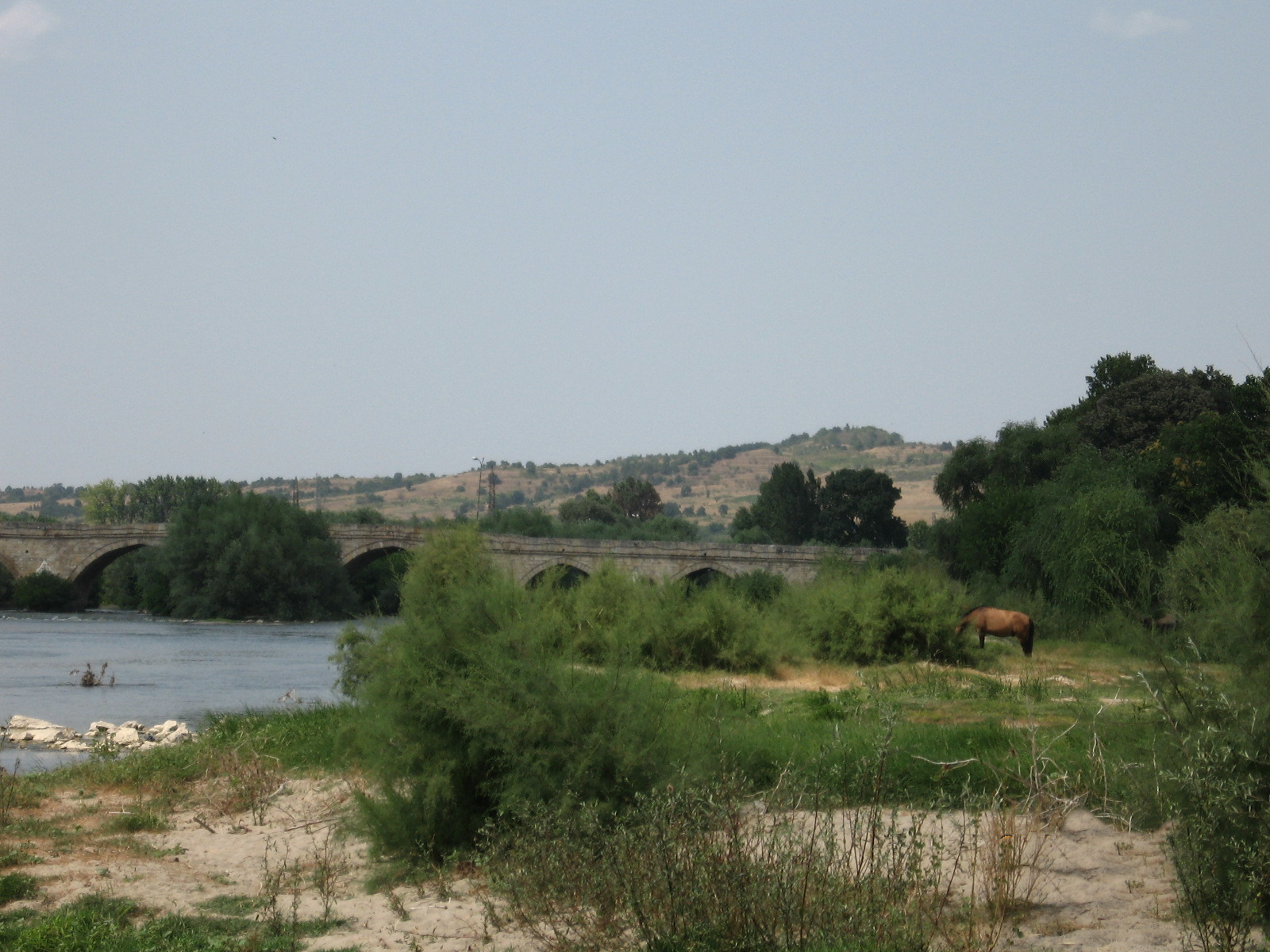
The Bridge over the Maritsa River.

=== Middle Ages ===
The region was a bustling crossroads and an arena of constant wars even after the establishment of the Bulgarian state. Under Khan Krum (803-814), Bulgarian troops often ravaged areas of the Byzantine Empire, according to the triumphal columns of Pliska for the conquest of the fortresses of Scutarion (now Shtit), Provat and others.

This region is associated with one of the greatest battles in medieval Bulgarian history. In 1205, Kaloyan's troops inflicted the first major defeat on the hitherto invincible army of the Latin Empire, led by Emperor Baldwin. It is believed that the site of the battle was north of Adrianople, at the foot of Bukelon Fortress.

In 1371, on the opposite right bank of the Maritsa River near Chermen, the Battle of Chernomen took place between the troops of Sultan Murad I and the Christian forces under the command of King Vukašin and Despot Uglješa, which ended in catastrophic defeat for the Christians and subsequent Ottoman occupation.

In 1433, the Burgundian pilgrim Bertrand de la Broquierre passed through here, then the first armor bearer of Philip the Good, Duke of Burgundy, who traveled to the Holy Sepulcher and back to explore the possibilities of a new crusade. Brokier describes how on the first day of the journey from Adrianople up the Maritsa River he and his comrades, numbering 10 horses, were transported in such a raft on March 12, 1433. Among the passengers was the Milan ambassador to the Turkish sultan in Adrianople.

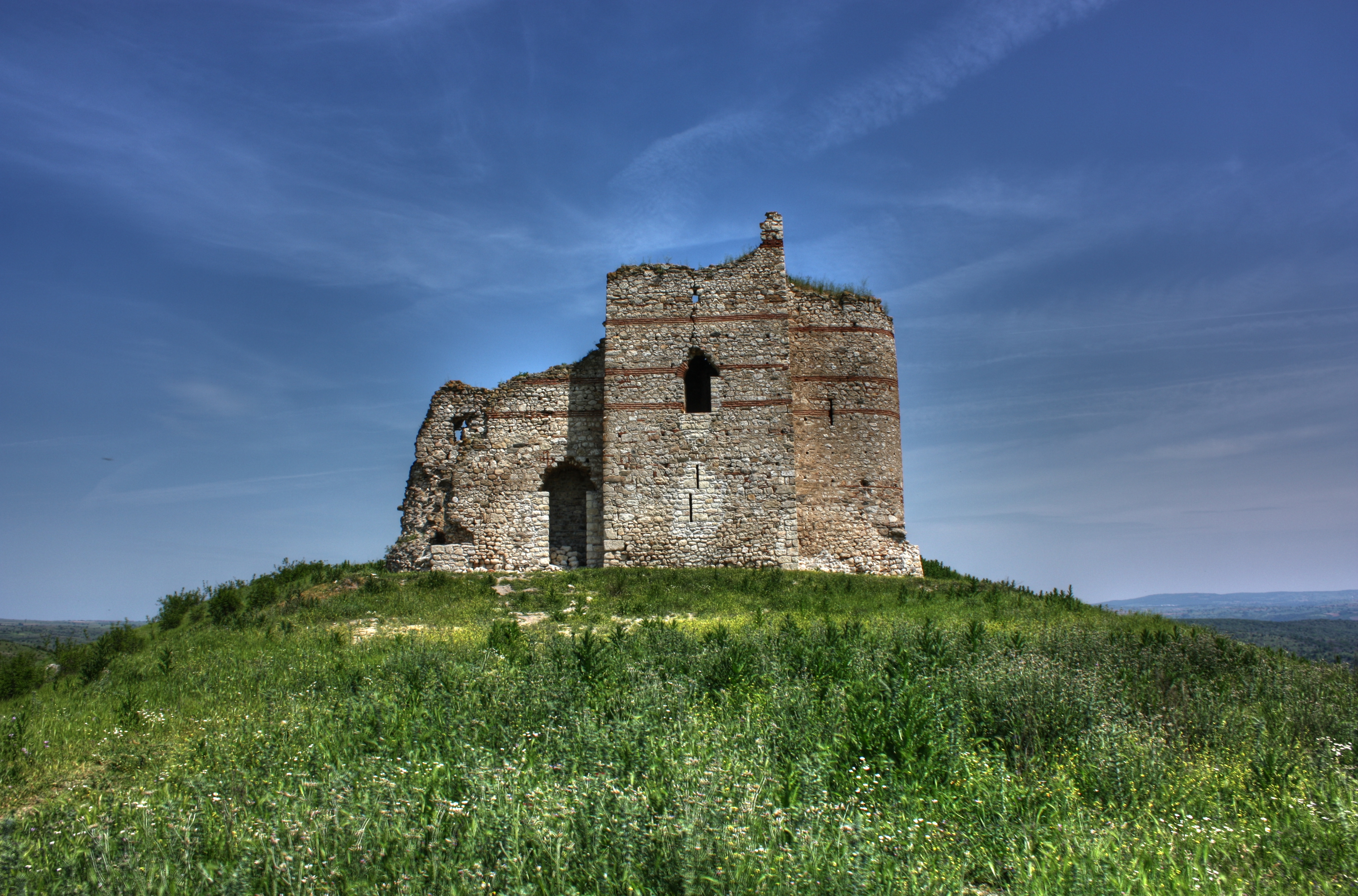
Bukelon Fortress

In 1529 a bridge was built on the Maritsa River, representing a significant facility for its time. The bridge now connects the two parts of Svilengrad. A new settlement appeared around the bridge - Jesir Mustafa Pasha, which became a town in the second half of the 16th century.

=== Revival ===
During the Ottoman rule, the population of the city selflessly fought to preserve their national identity. In 1847 a school for secular sciences was built. The patriarch of Bulgarian literature Ivan Vazov taught in this school from 1872 to 1873. In 1870 the Zvezda Chitalishte opened its doors. Another Revival teacher - Peter Stanchov, became the godfather of the city. The settlement began to be called so only in 1913.

On the way to Constantinople, famous Bulgarian revolutionaries, educators and revivalists - Georgi Rakovski, Petko Slaveykov, Hristo G. Danov, Dragan Tsankov, Konstantin Velichkov - passed and stayed here. Vasil Levski also came to the city. Here, in 1871, he founded a secret revolutionary committee. On January 8, 1878, Russian troops, commanded by General Alexander Strukov, entered Svilengrad following the retreat of the Turks. A year later, after the Berlin Treaty, the city was left under Turkish rule.

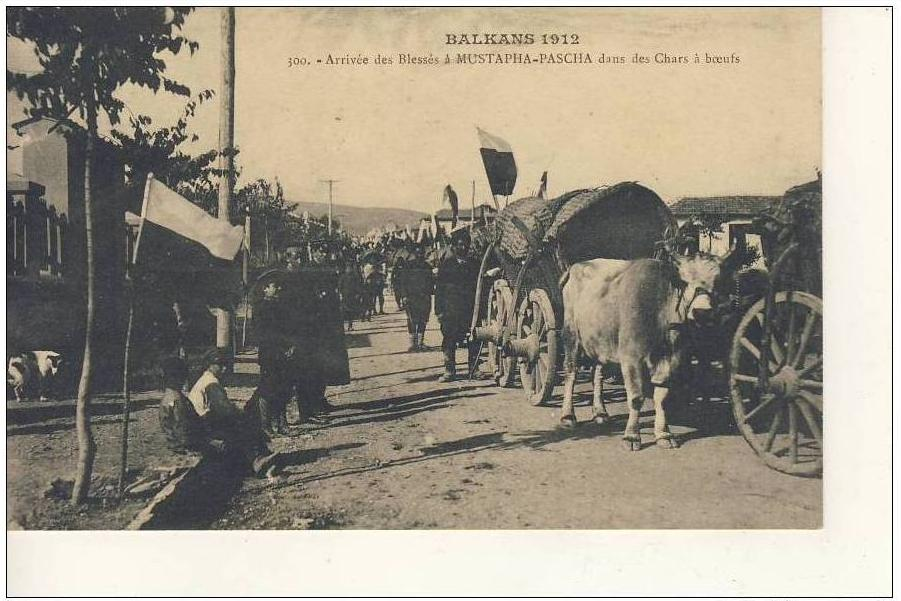
Bulgarian troops entering Svilengrad in 1912

34 years later, during the First Balkan War, Svilengrad was occupied by Bulgarian forces on 5 October 1912, after the Bulgarian army captured Sheinovets peak in the Rhodopes ending over five centuries of Turkish rule. During the Balkan Wars, the first military airport near Svilengrad was equipped.

During the Second Balkan War, in the summer of 1913, the city was ruined and burned house by house when the Ottomans entered the war against Bulgaria. The city was finally returned to Bulgaria at the end of September 1913, after the Treaty of Constantinople. Its returned inhabitants revived the city from the ashes and rebuilt it.

During World War II, in 1940, one of the escape routes of Poles from occupied Poland led through Svilengrad to the territory of Polish-allied France, where the Polish Army was reconstituted to continue the fight against Germany (see also Bulgaria–Poland relations).

== Sports ==
- FC Svilengrad 1921

== Notable people ==
- Binka Zhelyazkova – film director
- Hristo Atanassov – politician
- Ognyana Dusheva – sprint canoer
- Milko Kalaidjiev – singer
- Rıza Tevfik Bölükbaşı – Turkish philosopher, poet and politician
- Nikolay Mihaylov – Bulgarian cyclist

== Honours ==
Svilengrad Peninsula on Davis Coast, Antarctica is named after the town, in connection with its pioneering role in the world aerial warfare history.
