= Hungarian Sportspeople of the Year =

Award

Hungarian Sportspeople of the Year (Hungarian: Az év magyar sportolója) awards are granted each year since 1958, with categories for sportsmen, sportswomen, teams, coaches (since 1985) and presidents (since 1995).

== List of winners ==
Year	Sportsman of the Year		Sportswoman of the Year		Team of the Year
Year	Athlete	Sport	Athlete	Sport	Team of the Year
1958	Imre Polyák	wrestling	Zsuzsa Körmöczy	tennis	Men's water polo team
1959	Rudolf Kárpáti	fencing	Kornélia Méray	rowing	Men's team épée
1960	Rudolf Kárpáti (2)	fencing	Kornélia Méray (2)	rowing	Men's modern pentathlon team
1961	György Gurics	wrestling	Kornélia Méray (3)	rowing	Men's water polo team
1962	Imre Polyák (2)	wrestling	Márta Egerváry	swimming	Men's water polo team
1963	Győző Veres	weightlifting	Ildikó Rejtő	fencing	Men's modern pentathlon team
1964	Ferenc Török	modern pentathlon	Ildikó Rejtő (2)	fencing	Men's football team
1965	Gyula Zsivótzky	hammer throw	Jolán Kleiber-Kontsek	discus throw	Women's handball team
1966	András Balczó	modern pentathlon	Zsuzsa Nagy Szabó	athletics	Men's modern pentathlon team
1967	István Kozma	wrestling	Annamária Kovács Tóth	modern pentathlon	Men's modern pentathlon team
1968	Gyula Zsivótzky (2)	hammer throw	Angéla Németh	javelin throw	Men's team épée
1969	András Balczó (2)	modern pentathlon	Angéla Németh (2)	javelin throw	Junior Men's modern pentathlon team
1970	Péter Kelemen	modern pentathlon	Andrea Gyarmati	swimming	Men's modern pentathlon team
1971	Csaba Hegedűs	wrestling	Andrea Gyarmati (2)	swimming	Men's team épée
1972	András Balczó (3)	modern pentathlon	Andrea Gyarmati (3)	swimming	Men's team épée
1973	Géza Csapó	canoe racing	Ildikó Tordasi	fencing	Men's water polo team
1974	Zoltán Magyar	artistic gymnastics	Ilona Bruzsenyák	long jump	Men's water polo team
1975	András Hargitay	swimming	Mariann Ambrus	rowing	Men's modern pentathlon team
1976	Miklós Németh	javelin throw	Ildikó Tordasi (2)	fencing	Men's water polo team
1977	Pál Gerevich	fencing	Mariann Ambrus (2)	rowing	Men's water polo team
1978	Zoltán Magyar (2)	artistic gymnastics	Judit Magos	table tennis	Men's chess team
1979	Tamás Wichmann	canoe racing	Andrea Mátay	high jump	Men's table tennis team
1980	Zoltán Magyar (3)	artistic gymnastics	Magda Maros	fencing	Ice dancing (Regőczy & Sallay)
1981	Sándor Wladár	swimming	Éva Rakusz	canoe racing	Men's team foil
1982	Jenő Pap	fencing	Pálma Balogh	shooting	Men's team foil
1983	György Guczoghy	artistic gymnastics	Andrea Temesvári	tennis	Men's modern pentathlon team
1984	Tamás Gáspár	wrestling	Mária Ábrahám	bowling	Men's equestrianism team
1985	Attila Mizsér	modern pentathlon	Éva Fórián	shooting	Men's football team
1986	Tamás Darnyi	swimming	Csilla Bátorfi	table tennis	Men's handball team
1987	Tamás Darnyi (2)	swimming	Mariann Engrich	taekwondo	Men's modern pentathlon team
1988	Tamás Darnyi (3)	swimming	Krisztina Egerszegi	swimming	Men's modern pentathlon team
1989	László Fábián	modern pentathlon	Krisztina Egerszegi (2)	swimming	Men's modern pentathlon team
1990	Tamás Darnyi (4)	swimming	Krisztina Egerszegi (3)	swimming	Women's chess team
1991	István Kovács	boxing	Krisztina Egerszegi (4)	swimming	Men's K-4 (Horváth, Kammerer, Storcz, Vereckei)
1992	Tamás Darnyi (5)	swimming	Krisztina Egerszegi (5)	swimming	Women's K-4 (Czigány, Dónusz, Kőbán, Mészáros)
1993	Antal Kovács	judo	Krisztina Egerszegi (6)	swimming	Men's water polo team
1994	Norbert Rózsa	swimming	Rita Kőbán	canoe racing	Women's water polo team
1995	Imre Pulai	canoe racing	Rita Kőbán (2)	canoe racing	Men's C-2 (Horváth & Kolonics)
1996	István Kovács (2)	boxing	Krisztina Egerszegi (7)	swimming	Men's C-2 (Horváth & Kolonics)
1997	Botond Storcz	canoe racing	Ágnes Kovács	swimming	Men's water polo team
1998	Tibor Gécsek	hammer throw	Ágnes Kovács (2)	swimming	Men's team épée
1999	Gábor Balogh	modern pentathlon	Ágnes Kovács (3)	swimming	Men's water polo team
2000	Szilveszter Csollány	artistic gymnastics	Ágnes Kovács (4)	swimming	Men's water polo team
2001	Gábor Balogh (2)	modern pentathlon	Gyöngyi Likerecz	weightlifting	Rowing, men's double sculls (Haller & Pető)
2002	Szilveszter Csollány (2)	artistic gymnastics	Katalin Kovács	canoe racing	Rowing, men's double sculls (Haller & Pető)
2003	Adrián Annus	hammer throw	Katalin Kovács (2)	canoe racing	Men's water polo team
2004	István Majoros	wrestling	Natasa Janics	canoe racing	Men's water polo team
2005	Ákos Braun	judo	Zsuzsanna Vörös	modern pentathlon	Women's K-2 (Janics & Kovács)
2006	László Cseh	swimming	Tímea Nagy	fencing	Women's K-2 (Janics & Kovács)
2007	Gábor Talmácsi	motorcycle racing	Ágnes Szávay	tennis	Men's team épée
2008	Attila Vajda	canoe racing	Ildikó Mincza-Nébald	fencing	Men's water polo team
2009	Dániel Gyurta	swimming	Katinka Hosszú	swimming	Men's U-20 football team
2010	Krisztián Berki	artistic gymnastics	Natasa Janics (2)	canoe racing	Women's K-2 (Janics & Kovács)
2011	Krisztián Berki (2)	artistic gymnastics	Tamara Csipes	canoe racing	Ferencvárosi TC (women's handball)
2012	Dániel Gyurta (2)	swimming	Éva Risztov	swimming	Men's K-2 (Dombi & Kökény)
2013	Dániel Gyurta (3)	swimming	Katinka Hosszú (2)	swimming	Men's water polo team
2014	Krisztián Berki (3)	artistic gymnastics	Katinka Hosszú (3)	swimming	Győri ETO KC (women's handball)
2015	László Cseh (2)	swimming	Katinka Hosszú (4)	swimming	Men's ice hockey team
2016	Áron Szilágyi	fencing	Katinka Hosszú (5)	swimming	Men's football team
2017	Balázs Baji	athletics	Katinka Hosszú (6)	swimming	Győri ETO KC (women's handball)
2018	Shaolin Sándor Liu	short track speed skating	Danuta Kozák	canoe racing	Győri ETO KC (women's handball)
2019	Kristóf Milák	swimming	Katinka Hosszú (7)	swimming	Ferencvárosi TC (men's water polo)
2020	Dominik Szoboszlai	football	Hedvig Karakas	judo	Men's football team
2021	Áron Szilágyi (2)	fencing	Tamara Csipes (2)	canoe racing	Women's water polo team
2022	Kristóf Milák (2)	swimming	Luca Kozák	athletics	Women's national team fencing sabre
2023	Dominik Szoboszlai (2)	football	Mária Érdi	sailing	Men's football team
2024	Hubert Kós	swimming	Michelle Gulyás	modern pentathlon	Men's national team fencing épée
2025	Hubert Kós	swimming	Márton Luana	taekwondo	FTC Men's water polo team

== Statistics ==
=== Individual winners of three or more titles ===
Name	Sport	Number of titles
Krisztina Egerszegi	swimming	7
Katinka Hosszú	swimming	7
Tamás Darnyi	swimming	5
Ágnes Kovács	swimming	4
András Balczó	modern pentathlon	3
Krisztián Berki	artistic gymnastics	3
Andrea Gyarmati	swimming	3
Dániel Gyurta	swimming	3
Zoltán Magyar	gymnastics	3
Kornélia Méray	rowing	3

=== Breakdown of winners by sport ===
Men

Sport	No. of wins	Winning years
Swimming	16	1975, 1981, 1986, 1987, 1988, 1990, 1992, 1994, 2006, 2009, 2012, 2013, 2015, 2019, 2022, 2024
Modern pentathlon	9	1964, 1966, 1969, 1970, 1972, 1985, 1989, 1999, 2001
Artistic gymnastics	9	1974, 1978, 1980, 1983, 2000, 2002, 2010, 2011, 2014
Wrestling	7	1958, 1961, 1962, 1967, 1971, 1984, 2004
Athletics	6	1965, 1968, 1976, 1998, 2003, 2017
Fencing	6	1959, 1960, 1977, 1982, 2016, 2021
Canoe racing	5	1973, 1979, 1995, 1997, 2008
Boxing	2	1991, 1996
Football	2	2020, 2023
Judo	2	1993, 2005
Weightlifting	1	1963
Motorcycle racing	1	2007
Short track speed skating	1	2018

Women

Sport	No. of wins	Winning years
Swimming	23	1962, 1970, 1971, 1972, 1988, 1989, 1990, 1991, 1992, 1993, 1996, 1997, 1998, 1999, 2000, 2009, 2012, 2013, 2014, 2015, 2016, 2017, 2019
Canoe racing	10	1981, 1994, 1995, 2002, 2003, 2004, 2010, 2011, 2018, 2021
Athletics	7	1965, 1966, 1968, 1969, 1974, 1979, 2022
Fencing	7	1963, 1964, 1973, 1976, 1980, 2006, 2008
Rowing	5	1959, 1960, 1961, 1975, 1977
Modern pentathlon	3	1967, 2005, 2024
Tennis	3	1958, 1983, 2007
Table tennis	2	1978, 1986
Shooting	2	1982, 1985
Bowling	1	1984
Taekwondo	1	1987
Weightlifting	1	2001
Judo	1	2020
Sailing	1	2023

== Coach/President of the Year ==
Year	Coach of the Year		President of the Year	
Year	Winner	Sport	Winner	Sport
1985	György Mezey	football	–	–
1986	Tamás Széchy	swimming	–	–
1987	Tamás Széchy (2)	swimming	–	–
1988	Tamás Széchy (3)	swimming	–	–
1989	Ferenc Török	modern pentathlon	–	–
1990	Tamás Széchy (4)	swimming	–	–
1991	László Kiss	swimming	–	–
1992	László Kiss (2)	swimming	–	–
1993	László Kiss (3)	swimming	–	–
1994	Tamás Széchy (5)	swimming	–	–
1995	Róbert Ludasi	canoe racing	Vilmos Vajda	canoe racing (MKKSZ)
1996	László Kiss (4)	swimming	Tamás Széchy	swimming (MÚSZ)
1997	László Kiss (5)	swimming	Imre Szántó	boxing (MÖSZ)
1998	Pál Németh	athletics	Zoltán Angyal	canoe racing (MKKSZ)
1999	László Kiss (6)	swimming	Dénes Kemény	Men's water polo
2000	Nándor Sári	canoe racing	Dénes Kemény (2)	Men's water polo
2001	Katalin Rozsnyói	canoe racing	Zoltán Angyal (2)	canoe racing (MKKSZ)
2002	Katalin Rozsnyói (2)	canoe racing	Zoltán Angyal (3)	canoe racing (MKKSZ)
2003	Katalin Rozsnyói (3)	canoe racing	Dénes Kemény (3)	Men's water polo
2004	Katalin Rozsnyói (4)	canoe racing	Dénes Kemény (4)	Men's water polo
2005	Katalin Rozsnyói (5)	canoe racing	Tamás Faragó	Women's water polo
2006	Katalin Rozsnyói (6)	canoe racing	Zoltán Angyal (4)	canoe racing (MKKSZ)
2007	Zoltán Kuhárszky	tennis	Zoltán Angyal (5)	canoe racing (MKKSZ)
2008	György Turi	swimming	Dénes Kemény (5)	Men's water polo
2009	Lajos Mocsai	handball	Sándor Egervári	Men's U-20 football
2010	István Kovács	artistic gymnastics	László Kiss	swimming (MÚSZ)
2011	Ferenc Csipes	canoe racing	Botond Storcz	canoe racing (MKKSZ)
2012	Sándor Széles	swimming	Lajos Mocsai	Men's handball
2013	Shane Tusup	swimming	Tibor Benedek	Men's water polo
2014	Shane Tusup (2)	swimming	Botond Storcz (2)	canoe racing (MKKSZ)
2015	Pál Dárdai	football	From 2015 merged with Coach of the Year awards.	
2016	Shane Tusup (3)	swimming	–	–
2017	Shane Tusup (4)	swimming	–	–
2018	Ákos Bánhidi and Zhang Jing	short track speed skating	–	–
2019	Zsolt Varga	Men's water polo	–	–
2020	Marco Rossi	football	–	–
2021	András Decsi	fencing	–	–
2022	Marco Rossi	football	–	–
2023	Marco Rossi (2)	football	–	–
2024	Vladimir Golovin	handball	–	–
