= Kinka =

Kinka may refer to:

== Locations ==
- Mount Kinka (disambiguation), multiple mountains
- Kinka Beach, Queensland
- Konka (river, Zaporizhzhia Oblast), also known as the Kinka

== People ==
- Rita Kinka (born 1962), Serbian pianist
- Kinka Racheva (born 1973), Bulgarian sprint canoer
- Kinka Usher (born 1960), French television director
