= Krisztina Egerszegi =

Hungarian swimmer (born 1974)

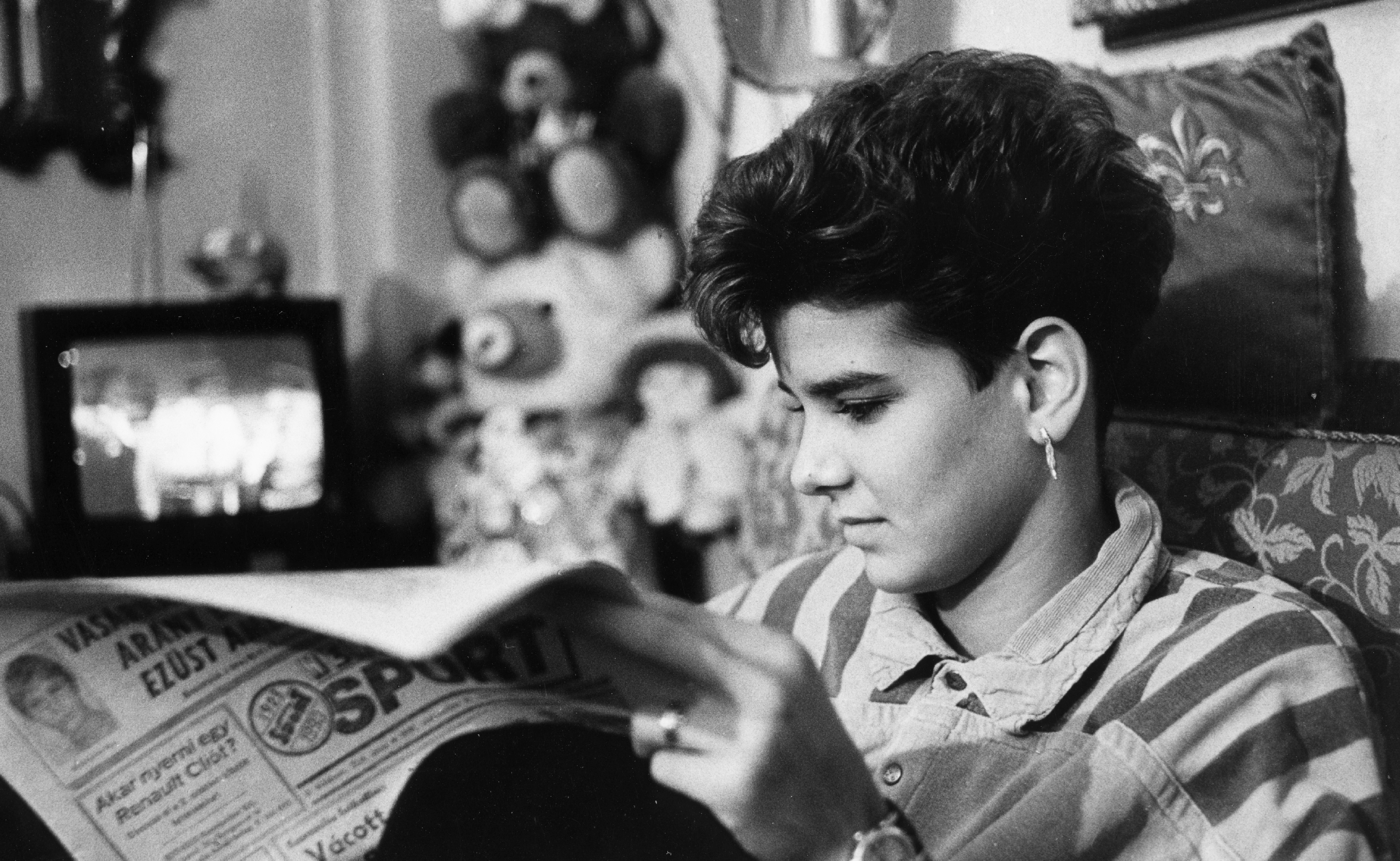
- Egerszegi in 1989

Personal information
- Full name: Krisztina Egerszegi
- Nicknames: Egérke (Little Mouse), Egér (Mouse), Queen Kristina (1992)
- Nationality: Hungarian
- Born: 16 August 1974 (age 52) Budapest, Hungary
- Height: 174 cm (5 ft 9 in)
- Weight: 57 kg (126 lb)

Sport
- Sport: Swimming
- Strokes: Backstroke, individual medley, butterfly
- Club: Budapesti Spartacus SC
- Coach: Miklós Kiss (1981–1982); György Turi (1982–1986); László Kiss (1986–1996)
Medal record
International aquatics competitions
Event	1st	2nd	3rd
Olympic Games	5	1	1
World Championships	2	1	0
European Championships (LC)	9	4	0
European Junior Championships (LC)	3	0	0
Goodwill Games	1	1	0
Total	20	7	1
Representing Hungary
Olympic Games
Gold medal – first place	1988 Seoul	200 m backstroke
Gold medal – first place	1992 Barcelona	100 m backstroke
Gold medal – first place	1992 Barcelona	200 m backstroke
Gold medal – first place	1992 Barcelona	400 m medley
Gold medal – first place	1996 Atlanta	200 m backstroke
Silver medal – second place	1988 Seoul	100 m backstroke
Bronze medal – third place	1996 Atlanta	400 m medley
World Championships
Gold medal – first place	1991 Perth	100 m backstroke
Gold medal – first place	1991 Perth	200 m backstroke
Silver medal – second place	1994 Rome	200 m backstroke
European Championships (LC)
Gold medal – first place	1991 Athens	100 m backstroke
Gold medal – first place	1991 Athens	200 m backstroke
Gold medal – first place	1991 Athens	400 m medley
Gold medal – first place	1993 Sheffield	100 m backstroke
Gold medal – first place	1993 Sheffield	200 m backstroke
Gold medal – first place	1993 Sheffield	200 m butterfly
Gold medal – first place	1993 Sheffield	400 m medley
Gold medal – first place	1995 Vienna	200 m backstroke
Silver medal – second place	1995 Vienna	400 m medley
Silver medal – second place	1989 Bonn	100 m backstroke
Silver medal – second place	1989 Bonn	200 m backstroke
Silver medal – second place	1989 Bonn	400 m medley
Silver medal – second place	1995 Vienna	4×100 m medley

Krisztina Egerszegi (Hungarian pronunciation: [ˈkristinɒ ˈɛɡɛrsɛɡi]; born 16 August 1974) is a Hungarian former world record holding swimmer and one of the greatest Hungarian Olympic champions of the modern era. She is a three-time Olympian (1988, 1992 and 1996) and five-time Olympic champion; and one of four individuals (Dawn Fraser, Michael Phelps and Katie Ledecky being the other three) to have ever won the same swimming event at three consecutive Summer Olympics. She is the first female swimmer to win five individual Olympic gold medals.

Egerszegi held the world record in the long-course 200 m backstroke for almost 17 years. In 2013, she was awarded the Hungarian Order of Saint Stephen.

== Biography ==
Egerszegi made her international debut at the 1987 European Aquatics Championships at the age of 13, coming fourth in the 200 m backstroke and fifth in the 100 m backstroke. At the 1988 Summer Olympics, she won silver medal in the 100 m backstroke and became Olympic champion in the 200 m backstroke. At the age of 14 years and 41 days, she became the youngest-ever female Olympic champion in swimming. This youth record was broken in 1992 by Kyoko Iwasaki of Japan, who won a gold medal in the 200 m breaststroke at the 1992 Summer Olympics at the age of 14 years and six days. At the end of 1988, she was the top-ranked swimmer in 200 m backstroke in the world ranking as well as she became the Swimmer of the Year and the Best Female Athlete of the Year in Hungary.

At the 1989 European Aquatics Championships, she competed in three events adding the 400 m medley to the 100 m and 200 m backstroke, winning silver medal in all three events despite she struggled with a strong cold during the entire Championships. At the end of that year, she topped again the world ranking in 200 m backstroke and she was selected again the Best Female Athlete of the Year in Hungary.

At the 1990 Goodwill Games in Seattle, she won the Hungarian team's only gold and silver medal (first in 200 m backstroke, second in 100 m backstroke), with which Hungary finished 16th in the overall standings. At the Hungarian Championships, which was held in December due to the World Championships in Australia she won 12 gold medals. Egerszegi finished the year of 1990 again as the Best Swimmer and as the Best Female Athlete of Hungary.

In 1991, she competed at the World Championships in Perth, Australia, winning both backstroke events (100 and 200 metres) and becoming the first Hungarian female swimmer of all time who won gold medals at the World Championships. A few months later at the European Championships in Athens, Greece, she won three gold medals and set world records in the 100 m (1:00.31 min) and 200 m (2:06.62 min) backstroke events. Eleven years after Rica Reinisch, Egerszegi was the first female swimmer since 1980, who set world records on both 100 m and 200 m at the same event. Since 1983 (when Rick Carey completed this feat in Clovis, USA), Egerszegi was the first swimmer who broke both world records of the backstroke at the same event. At the Hungarian Swimming Championships, she added 10 gold medals to her unique collection. In December, she won her 4 consecutive awards as the Best Swimmer and the Best Athlete of the Year in Hungary. The Italian newspaper La Gazzetta dello Sport has been voted her as the world's second best athlete.

In April 1992, along with the two-time Olympic champion sprint canoer Zsolt Gyulay has administered the official Olympic oath on behalf of the Hungarian Olympic Team and athletes. At the Hungarian Championships, she collected 8 more gold medals. At the 1992 Summer Olympics in Barcelona, Spain, she won three individual gold medals, becoming the only female athlete at the Games to do so. End of 1992, she got the most votes again at the Best Swimmer and Best Athlete of the Year selection. La Gazzetta dello Sport has been top-ranked her as the Best Female Athlete of the Year.

In 1993, she claimed 10 first places at the Hungarian Championships then at the European Championships in Sheffield, England, she competed in the 200 m butterfly for the first time and went on to win four gold medals also winning the 400 m medley and the 100 m and 200 m backstroke. In December, she was selected the Best Swimmer and Best Athlete of the Year in Hungary, while La Gazzetta dello Sport and L'Équipe voted her as the best female athlete of the year.

In 1994, she won 9 gold medals at the Hungarian Championships and then she announced that she would retire after the World Championships in Rome which was overshadowed by the suspicious Chinese swimmers' performances. China won 12 of the 16 women's titles, but these achievements were sullied less than a month later when seven Chinese swimmers tested positive for banned drugs at the Asian Games in Hiroshima. In Rome, Egerszegi lost the 100 m and 200 m backstroke, both events were won by He Cihong, who was only 13th (1:03.50) on 100 m backstroke two years earlier in Barcelona, where Egerszegi won in an Olympic record time of 1:00.68. At the 1996 Summer Olympics in Atlanta, He Cihong was 25th on the 100 m backstroke. On the 200 m backstroke, He Cihong qualified neither for Barcelona, nor Atlanta; both Olympic golds were won by Egerszegi. After getting fifth place in the 100 m backstroke and coming second in the 200 m backstroke, Egerszegi decided to compete for two more years, citing the two defeats as the main reason.

At the Hungarian Championship in 1995, she claimed 9 gold medals. She competed at the 1995 European Aquatics Championships where she won the last two of her nine European titles in the 400 m medley and the 200 m backstroke event. For the first time, she competed in the 4×100 m medley relay where one of her teammates was Ágnes Kovács, a future Olympic champion, with both coming in second place. She decided not to compete in the 100 m backstroke even though her time of 1:00.93 clocked during the 4×100 m relay final was better than Mette Jacobsen's winning time of 1:02.46 by almost two seconds.

In 1996, she closed her final appearance at the Hungarian Championships with collecting 9 gold medals. In Atlanta, at the Centennial Olympic Games, although Egerszegi advanced into the final with the best time on 400 individual medley, she finished in third. This was her first and only bronze medal during her Olympic career. She competed in the 4×100 m medley relay as member of the Hungarian team, who finished in 11th. Her time in this event at the qualification round, would have won the 100 m backstroke event. Her final career appearance was one of the finest farewell of all time in swimming sport: she won her beloved 200 m backstroke event with the greatest margin in any short distance events of the swimming sport, collecting her fifth individual gold medal and defending her titles for three consecutive Olympic Games.

== The greatest margin ==
At the 1996 Summer Olympics, she won her first and only Olympic bronze medal in the 400 m medley and went on to win the 200 m backstroke becoming the second of only four swimmers in Olympic history (Dawn Fraser, Michael Phelps & Katie Ledecky being the other three) to win gold for the same event at three successive Olympics (200 m backstroke: 1988, 1992, 1996). Between the winning time of Egerszegi (2:07.83) and time of the runner-up Whitney Hedgepeth (2:11.98), the margin of victory was 4.15 seconds, which is the greatest in any women's 200 m event in the swimming history. In 1996, Egerszegi did not enter the 100 m backstroke, yet her leadoff backstroke time in the medley relay, 1:01.15, was faster than the winning time in the 100 m backstroke final.

Between 1988 and 1996 she won 5 individual Olympic gold medals, which was a record for a swimmer for individual gold medal wins. This record has since been broken by Michael Phelps, who won 13 individual gold medals. Egerszegi's record for female swimmers was broken by Katie Ledecky in 2021.

Egerszegi announced her retirement from swimming soon after the Olympic Games, at the age of only 22. In the same year, she became the board member of the Hungarian Swimming Association and in 2007 the member of the Hungarian Olympic Committee as well as she was named for 9th times as the Best Swimmer of the Year and for 7th times as the Best Female Athlete of the Year.

== Records ==
Egerszegi won the 100 m backstroke at 1991 European Championships in Athens setting her first world record with 1:00:31. She broke Ina Kleber's time (1:00:59) from 1984. Three days later, Egerszegi broke Betsy Mitchell's five-years-old record (2:08.60) in the 200 m backstroke, setting her second world record at 2:06.62 min. She held this world record in the long course 200 m backstroke for 16 and half years (25 August 1991 – 16 February 2008). Her record in 200 m backstroke remained the oldest European record until 1 August 2009, when Anastasia Zuyeva (RUS) broke it at the 2009 World Aquatics Championships in Rome. Egerszegi set her first Olympic record on 200 m backstroke with 2:09.29 in 1988, which she improved in 1992 (2:07.06). This record was broken in 2008 at the Beijing Olympics by Kirsty Coventry. Egerszegi set the Olympic record on 100 backstroke with 1:00.68 in 1992, which was broken by Diana Mocanu (1:00.21) in 2000 in Sydney. Egerszegi's Hungarian (and world) record times on 100 m (1:00.31) and on 200 m backstroke (2:06.62) were the oldest ones on the list of the Hungarian records. The Hungarian record on 100 m backstroke was broken in 22 years later (April 2013) and the record on 200 m backstroke was broken at the 2015 World Aquatics Championships in Kazan, Russia. Both Hungarian records were set by Katinka Hosszú.

== Impact on Hungarian culture ==
Her 1988 winning in Seoul became one of the biggest TV moments in Hungary. The famous phrase "Come on Little Mouse! Come on little girl!" ("Gyere Egérke! Gyere kicsi lány!") by Tamás Vitray, who was the speaker on the air, is part of the popular culture. Egerszegi is still regarded as the role model of the "champion" in the country.

Her nickname was "Egérke" ("Little Mouse") or "Egér" ("Mouse"), a play on her surname, because of her youthfulness and size. After the 1992 Summer Olympics, where she became the most successful swimmer with three individual gold medals, she was called Krisztina Királynő ("Queen Kristina") both in the Hungarian and in some international media.

Her career was described in a 1993 book, Egerszegi, by László Ládonyi and György Volly and in a 2000 documentary film of the same title.

== Honours and awards ==
She was inducted into the International Swimming Hall of Fame in 2001. She was named Hungarian Sportswoman of the Year on a record-breaking seven occasions (1988, 1989, 1990, 1991, 1992, 1993 and 1996) and Female World Swimmer of the Year three times.

Egerszegi, one of the most prominent FINA athletes of all time, was awarded the Olympic Order on 23 June 2001, during the celebration of the Olympic Day by the International Olympic Committee (IOC) in Lausanne (SUI). On 20 August 2013, she was awarded with the highest state order of Hungary, the Order of Saint Stephen of Hungary Medal by the Hungarian President János Áder.

Further awards:

- Best Female Athlete of Europe (1992)
- Commander's Cross of the Hungarian Order of Merit (1992)
- Olympic Golden Ring (1995)
- Order of Merit of the Republic of Hungary (1996)
- Golden Deer Award (1996)
- Hungarian Heritage Award (1996)
- MOB (Hungarian Olympic Committee) Medal (1997)
- IOC Ethical Special Award (1999)
- 3rd in the Election for the Hungarian of the Century (2000)
- Induction of International Swimming Hall of Fame (2001)
- The Hungarian Female Athlete of the Century (2001)
- Fair Play Award for Lifetime Achievement (2001)
- Ferenc Csík Award (2001)
- IOC Olympic Order of Merit grade silver (2001)
- Honorary Citizen of Budavar
- IOC President's Trophy (2005)
- Prima Primissima Award (2007)
- St. Stephen Award (2010)
- Honorary Citizen of Budapest (2011)
- Hungarian Order of Saint Stephen (2013)
- Hall of Fame of the Hungarian Swimming Sports (2013)

== Results at the Hungarian Swimming Championships ==
	1986	1987	1988	1989	1990	1991	1992	1993	1994	1995	1996
100 m freestyle				1.	1.						
200 m freestyle				1.	1.	1.	1.	1.	1.	1.	1.
400 m freestyle				1.	1.						
800 m freestyle					1.	1.	1.				
50 m backstroke		3.									
100 m backstroke	4.	1.		1.	1.	1.	1.	1.	1.	1.	1.
200 m backstroke	3.	1.		1.	1.	1.	1.	1.	1.	1.	1.
200 m breaststroke							2.	2.	2.	2.	
100 m butterfly								1.	1.	2.	1.
200 m butterfly				1.	1.	1.	1.	1.	1.	1.	
200 m medley		1.		1.	1.	1.	1.	1.	1.	1.	1.
400 m medley	5.	1.		1.	1.	1.	1.	1.	1.	1.	1.
4 × 100 m freestyle		1.		1.	1.	1.	2.	1.	2.	1.	1.
4 × 200 m freestyle		1.		1.	1.	1.	1.	1.	1.	1.	1.
4 × 100 m medley	3.	4.	1.	1.	1.	1.	2.	1.	1.	1.	1.

== See also ==
- List of members of the International Swimming Hall of Fame
- List of multiple Olympic gold medalists at a single Games
- List of multiple Olympic gold medalists
- List of multiple Olympic gold medalists in one event
- List of top Olympic gold medalists in swimming
- World record progression 100 metres backstroke
- World record progression 200 metres backstroke

Records
Preceded by Ina Kleber	Women's 100 metre backstroke world record holder (long course); 22 August 1991 – 10 September 1994	Succeeded by He Cihong
Preceded by Betsy Mitchell	Women's 200 metre backstroke world record holder (long course); 25 August 1991 – 16 February 2008	Succeeded by Kirsty Coventry
Awards
Preceded by Mariann Engrich	Hungarian Sportswoman of the Year; 1988–1993	Succeeded by Rita Kőbán
Preceded by Rita Kőbán	Hungarian Sportswoman of the Year; 1996	Succeeded by Ágnes Kovács
Preceded by Janet Evans	World Swimmer of the Year; 1991–1992	Succeeded by Franziska van Almsick
Preceded by Samantha Riley	World Swimmer of the Year; 1995	Succeeded by Penny Heyns
Preceded by Anke Möhring	European Swimmer of the Year; 1990–1992	Succeeded by Franziska van Almsick
Preceded by Franziska van Almsick	European Swimmer of the Year; 1995	Succeeded by Michelle Smith
