= Torrejón (disambiguation) =

Torrejón de Ardoz is a municipality in Madrid metropolitan area, Spain.

Torrejón may also refer to:

== Places ==
- Torrejón Air Base, military air base in Torrejón de Ardoz
- Madrid–Torrejón Airport, airport in Torrejón de Ardoz
- Torrejón el Rubio, municipality in Extremadura, Spain
- Torrejón del Rey, municipality in Castile La Mancha, Spain
- Torrejón de Velasco, municipality in Community of Madrid, Spain
- Torrejón de la Calzada, municipality in Community of Madrid, Spain

== Organisations ==
- AD Torrejón CF, football club in Torrejón de Ardoz
- AD Torrejón, former football club in Torrejón de Ardoz

== People ==
- Marc Torrejón Moya (born 1986), Spanish footballer
- Marta Torrejón Moya (born 1990), Spanish footballer
- Claudio Torrejón (born 1993), Peruvian footballer
- Tomás de Torrejón y Velasco (1644–1728), Spanish/Peruvian composer
- Susana Torrejón (born 1960), Spanish canoeist
