= Antonio Rossi =

Italian canoeist

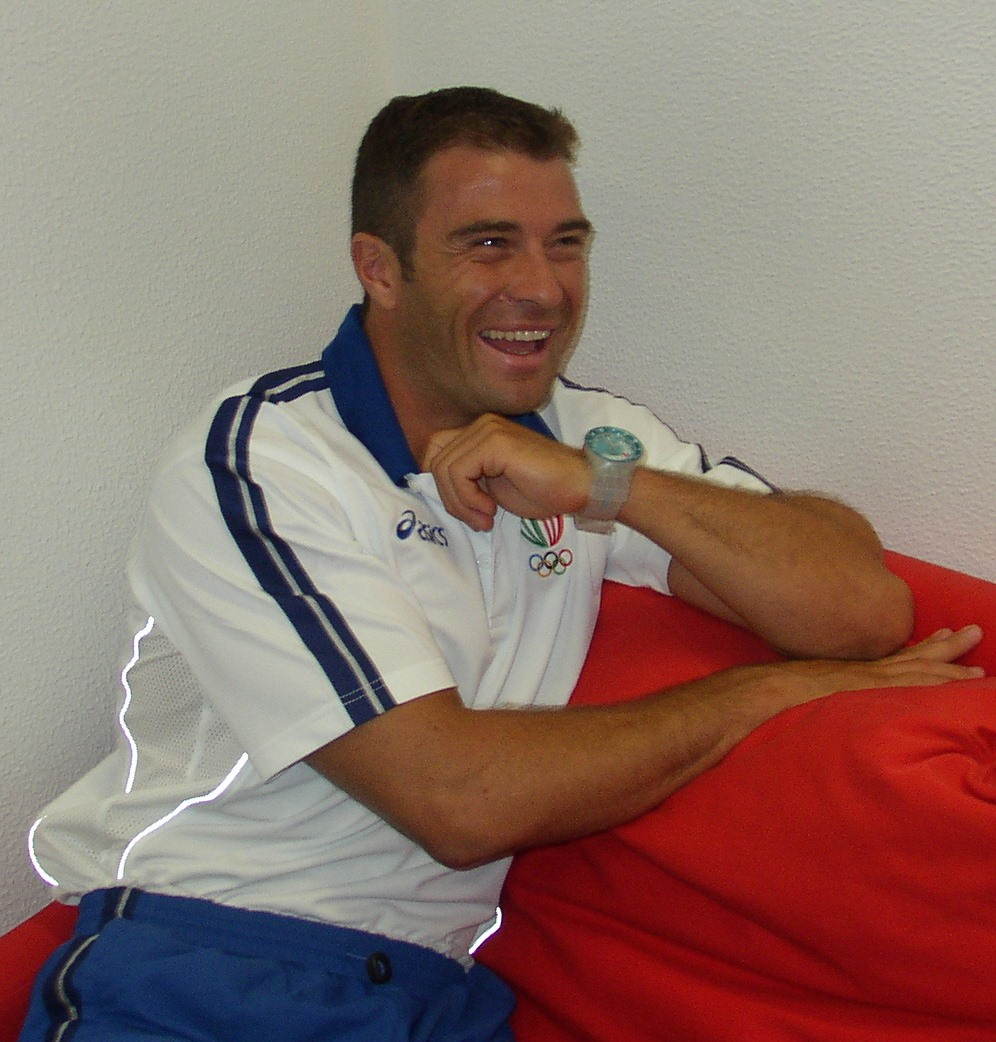
- Rossi in 2004

Personal information
- Born: December 19, 1968 (age 57) Lecco, Italy
Medal record
Men's canoe sprint
Representing Italy
Olympic Games
Gold medal – first place	1996 Atlanta	K-1 500 m
Gold medal – first place	1996 Atlanta	K-2 1000 m
Gold medal – first place	2000 Sydney	K-2 1000 m
Silver medal – second place	2004 Athens	K-2 1000 m
Bronze medal – third place	1992 Barcelona	K-2 500 m
World Championships
Gold medal – first place	1995 Duisburg	K-2 1000 m
Gold medal – first place	1997 Dartmouth	K-2 1000 m
Gold medal – first place	1998 Szeged	K-2 1000 m
Silver medal – second place	1993 Copenhagen	K-2 1000 m
Silver medal – second place	1994 Mexico City	K-2 1000 m
Silver medal – second place	1998 Szeged	K-4 200 m
Bronze medal – third place	1997 Dartmouth	K-1 500 m

Antonio Rossi (born December 19, 1968) is an Italian sprint canoer who has competed since the early 1990s. Competing in five Summer Olympics, he won five medals which included three golds (K-1 500 m: 1996, K-2 1000 m: 1996, 2000), one silver (K-2 1000 m: 2004), and one bronze (K-2 500 m: 1992).

== Biography ==
Rossi was born in Lecco. As well as the Olympics, he has also been successful at the ICF Canoe Sprint World Championships with seven medals. This includes three golds (K-2 1000 m: 1995, 1997, 1998), three silvers (K-2 1000 m: 1993, 1994; K-4 200 m: 1998), and one bronze (K-1 500 m: 1997).

He was the Italian flag bearer at the opening ceremony of the 2008 Summer Olympics in Beijing. Rossi's wife, Lucia Micheli, competed in the K-4 500 m event at the 1992 Summer Olympics in Barcelona. His club is G.S. Fiamme Gialle.

== See also ==
- Italy at the Olympics - Athletes with most medals
- Italy at the Olympics - Men gold medalist
- List of flag bearers for Italy at the Olympics

Summer Olympics
Preceded by Jury Chechi	Flag bearer for Italy; 2008 Beijing	Succeeded by Valentina Vezzali
