= Lasak =

Lasak may refer to:

== Places ==
- Lasak, Gilan, Iran

== Other uses ==
- Lasak (surname)
