= Alison Thorogood =

British sprint canoer (born 1960)

Alison Jane Thorogood (born 30 November 1960) is a British canoe sprinter who competed in the early-to-mid-1990s. At the 1992 Summer Olympics in Barcelona, she was eliminated in the semifinals of both the K-1 500 m and the K-4 500 m event. Four years later in Atlanta, Thorogood was eliminated in the semifinals of the K-2 500 m event.
