= Canoeing at the 1992 Summer Olympics – Women's K-4 500 metres =

The women's K-4 500 metres event was a fours kayaking event conducted as part of the Canoeing at the 1992 Summer Olympics program.

== Medalists ==
Gold	Silver	Bronze
Hungary; Rita Kőbán; Éva Dónusz; Erika Mészáros; Kinga Czigány	Germany; Katrin Borchert; Ramona Portwich; Birgit Schmidt; Anke von Seck	Sweden; Anna Olsson; Agneta Andersson; Maria Haglund; Susanne Rosenqvist

== Results ==
=== Heats ===
16 crews entered in two heats. The top two finishers from each of the heats advanced directly to the finals while the remaining teams were relegated to the semifinals.

Heat 1
1.	Ning Menghua, Wang Jing, Wen Yanfang, and Zhao Xiaoli (CHN)	1:36.15	QF
2.	Shelia Conover, Alexandra Harbold, Cathy Marino-Geers, and Traci Phillips (USA)	1:36.74	QF
3.	Viorica Iordache, Claudia Nicula, Carmen Simion, and Sanda Toma (ROU)	1:36.82	QS
4.	Annacatia Casagrande, Amalia Calzavara, Chiara Dal Santo, and Lucia Micheli (ITA)	1:38.82	QS
5.	Françoise Lasak, Bernadette Brégeon, Isabelle Boulogne, and Anne Michaut (FRA)	1:39.27	QS
6.	Denise Cooper, Lynda Lehmann, Gayle Mayes, and Anna Wood (AUS)	1:39.32	QS
7.	Pavlína Jobánková, Jitka Janáčková, Vladimíra Havelková, and Ivana Vokurková (TCH)	1:40.57	QS
8.	Bonka Pindzheva, Mariya Kichukova, Kinka Racheva, and Tanya Georgieva (BUL)	1:43.59	QS
Heat 2
1.	Éva Dónusz, Kinga Czigány, Rita Kőbán, and Erika Mészáros (HUN)	1:32.94	QF
2.	Agneta Andersson, Maria Haglund, Anna Olsson, and Susanne Rosenqvist (SWE)	1:33.25	QF
3.	Katrin Borchert, Ramona Portwich, Birgit Schmidt, and Anke von Seck (GER)	1:34.13	QS
4.	Caroline Brunet, Alison Herst, Klari McAskill, and Kevyn Stafford (CAN)	1:36.34	QS
5.	Irina Samoylova, Galina Savenko, Irina Vaag, and Olga Tishchenko (EUN)	1:38.25	QS
6.	Belén Sánchez, Joaquina Costa, Luisa Álvárez, and Ana María Penas (ESP)	1:38.72	QS
7.	Hilary Dresser, Andrea Dallaway, Alison Thorogood, and Sandra Troop (GBR)	1:40.22	QS
8.	Hege Brannsten, Nina Bergsvik, Tone Rasmussen, and Ingeborg Rasmussen (NOR)	1:40.53	QS

=== Semifinals ===
The top two finishers in each of the semifinals and the fastest third-place finisher advanced to the final.

Semifinal 1
1.	Katrin Borchert, Ramona Portwich, Birgit Schmidt, and Anke von Seck (GER)	1:37.48	QF
2.	Irina Samoylova, Galina Savenko, Irina Vaag, and Olga Tishchenko (EUN)	1:38.56	QF
3.	Denise Cooper, Lynda Lehmann, Gayle Mayes, and Anna Wood (AUS)	1:39.81	QF
4.	Annacatia Casagrande, Amalia Calzavara, Chiara Dal Santo, and Lucia Micheli (ITA)	1:41.08
5.	Hilary Dresser, Andrea Dallaway, Alison Thorogood, and Sandra Troop (GBR)	1:41.24
6.	Bonka Pindzheva, Mariya Kichukova, Kinka Racheva, and Tanya Georgieva (BUL)	1:45.90
Semifinal 2
1.	Caroline Brunet, Alison Herst, Klari McAskill, and Kevyn Stafford (CAN)	1:37.86	QF
2.	Viorica Iordache, Claudia Nicula, Carmen Simion, and Sanda Toma (ROU)	1:38.21	QF
3.	Pavlína Jobánková, Jitka Janáčková, Vladimíra Havelková, and Ivana Vokurková (TCH)	1:40.12
4.	Belén Sánchez, Joaquina Costa, Luisa Álvárez, and Ana María Penas (ESP)	1:40.17
5.	Françoise Lasak, Bernadette Brégeon, Isabelle Boulogne, and Anne Michaut (FRA)	1:41.83
6.	Hege Brannsten, Nina Bergsvik, Tone Rasmussen, and Ingeborg Rasmussen (NOR)	1:41.88

=== Final ===
The final was held on August 8.

Gold	Éva Dónusz, Kinga Czigány, Rita Kőbán, and Erika Mészáros (HUN)	1:36.32
Silver	Katrin Borchert, Ramona Portwich, Birgit Schmidt, and Anke von Seck (GER)	1:38.47
Bronze	Agneta Andersson, Maria Haglund, Anna Olsson, and Susanne Rosenqvist (SWE)	1:39.79
4.	Viorica Iordache, Claudia Nicula, Carmen Simion, and Sanda Toma (ROU)	1:41.02
5.	Ning Menghua, Wang Jing, Wen Yanfang, and Zhao Xiaoli (CHN)	1:41.12
6.	Caroline Brunet, Alison Herst, Klari McAskill, and Kevyn Stafford (CAN)	1:42.28
7.	Shelia Conover, Alexandra Harbold, Cathy Marino-Geers, and Traci Phillips (USA)	1:43.00
8.	Denise Cooper, Lynda Lehmann, Gayle Mayes, and Anna Wood (AUS)	1:43.88
9.	Irina Samoylova, Galina Savenko, Irina Vaag, and Olga Tishchenko (EUN)	1:44.84

Hungary beat Germany (formerly East and West Germany) after finishing second to them in every major competition since 1988.
