= Tanya Georgieva =

Bulgarian canoeist (born 1970)

Tanya Georgieva (Bulgarian: Таня Георгиева; born 12 June 1970 in Novi Iskar) is a Bulgarian sprint canoeist who competed in the early 1990s. She was eliminated in the semifinals of the K-4 500 m event at the 1992 Summer Olympics in Barcelona.
