= Kornélia Pap =

Hungarian rower (born 1930)

Personal information
- Born: 21 July 1930 (age 95)

Sport
- Sport: Rowing
Medal record
Women's rowing
Representing Hungary
European Rowing Championships
Bronze medal – third place	1955 Bucharest	Single sculls
Bronze medal – third place	1956 Bled	Single sculls
Bronze medal – third place	1957 Duisburg	Single sculls
Gold medal – first place	1958 Poznań	Single sculls
Gold medal – first place	1959 Mâcon	Single sculls
Gold medal – first place	1960 London	Single sculls
Gold medal – first place	1961 Prague	Single sculls

Kornélia Pap (later Méray, born 21 July 1930) is a Hungarian retired rower and journalist. She is the country's most successful rower.

Pap took up rowing in 1950. Her first international success was a bronze medal at the 1955 European Rowing Championships in Bucharest in single sculls. She won further bronze medals in 1956 in Bled and in 1957 in Duisburg. From 1958 in Poznań to 1961 in Prague, she was European champion four years in a row. She was elected Sportswoman of the Year in Hungary three years in a row from 1959 to 1961, after having come second in 1958. She worked as a journalist for Új Sport from 1960 to 1985.

Awards
Preceded by Zsuzsa Körmöczy	Hungarian Sportswoman of the Year; 1959–1961	Succeeded by Márta Egerváry
