= Viorica Iordache =

Romanian canoeist

Viorica Iordache (born June 18, 1971) is a Romanian sprint canoer who competed in the early to mid-1990s. Competing in two Summer Olympics, she earned her best finish of fourth in the K-4 500 m event at Barcelona in 1992.
