= Canoeing at the 1992 Summer Olympics – Women's K-1 500 metres =

The women's K-1 500 metres event was an individual kayaking event conducted as part of the Canoeing at the 1992 Summer Olympics program.

== Medalists ==
Gold	Silver	Bronze
Birgit Schmidt (GER)	Rita Kőbán (HUN)	Izabela Dylewska (POL)

== Results ==
=== Heats ===
16 competitors entered in three heats. The heats served as placement rounds for the semifinals.

Heat 1
1.	Birgit Schmidt (GER)	1:52.49
2.	Rita Kőbán (HUN)	1:53.36
3.	Josefa Idem (ITA)	1:54.08
4.	Izabela Dylewska (POL)	1:55.72
5.	Ursula Profanter (AUT)	1:56.25
6.	Yvonne Knudsen (DEN)	2:01.09
7.	Dene Simpson (RSA)	2:06.62
Heat 2
1.	Susanne Gunnarsson (SWE)	1:54.14
2.	Caroline Brunet (CAN)	1:56.32
3.	Sabine Goetschy (FRA)	1:57.68
4.	Ingrid Haralamow (SUI)	1:58.74
5.	Susana Torrejón (ESP)	2:03.76
Heat 3
1.	Shelia Conover (USA)	1:54.57
2.	Sanda Toma (ROU)	1:55.24
3.	Irina Vaag (EUN)	1:57.47
4.	Alison Thorogood (GBR)	1:57.63

=== Semifinals ===
Two semifinals were held. The top four finishers in each semifinal and the fastest fifth-place finisher advanced to the final.

Semifinal 1
1.	Josefa Idem (ITA)	1:51.56	QF
2.	Birgit Schmidt (GER)	1:52.13	QF
3.	Caroline Brunet (CAN)	1:52.69	QF
4.	Ursula Profanter (AUT)	1:52.86	QF
5.	Shelia Conover (USA)	1:53.05
6.	Irina Vaag (EUN)	1:56.71
7.	Susana Torrejón (ESP)	2:00.33
8.	Dene Simpson (RSA)	2:02.42
Semifinal 2
1.	Rita Kőbán (HUN)	1:50.97	QF
2.	Izabela Dylewska (POL)	1:51.61	QF
3.	Sabine Goetschy (FRA)	1:51.98	QF
4.	Susanne Gunnarsson (SWE)	1:52.30	QF
5.	Sanda Toma (ROU)	1:52.82	QF
6.	Ingrid Haralamow (SUI)	1:55.63
7.	Yvonne Knudsen (DEN)	1:57.94
8.	Alison Thorogood (GBR)	1:58.23

=== Final ===
The final was held on August 7.

Gold	Birgit Schmidt (GER)	1:51.80
Silver	Rita Kőbán (HUN)	1:51.96
Bronze	Izabela Dylewska (POL)	1:52.36
4.	Josefa Idem (ITA)	1:52.78
5.	Ursula Profanter (AUT)	1:53.17
6.	Sabine Goetschy (FRA)	1:53.53
7.	Caroline Brunet (CAN)	1:54.82
8.	Sanda Toma (ROU)	1:54.84
9.	Susanne Gunnarsson (SWE)	1:55.55
