= Andrea Dallaway =

British sprint canoer

Andrea Elizabeth Dallaway (born 14 October 1970) is a British canoe sprinter who competed in the late 1980s.

== Early life ==
She attended Pelsall Comprehensive School in Walsall.

In 1992 she worked for Royal Mail, and lived on Thames Street in Weybridge. She was financially sponsored by Royal Mail.

She trained with Elmbridge Canoe Club.

== Career ==
She was eliminated in the semifinals of the K-4 500 m event at the 1988 Summer Olympics in Seoul. Four years later in Barcelona, Dallaway was eliminated in the semifinals of the K-4 500 m event. At her third and final Summer Olympics in Atlanta, she was eliminated in the semifinals of the K-1 500 m event.

== Personal life ==
By 1998 she lived in Hednesford, and later in 1998 in Alrewas, both in Staffordshire.
