= Isabelle Boulogne =

French canoeist (born 1971)

- Born: 3 May 1971 (age 55); Épernay
- Occupation: Sprint Canoer

Isabelle Boulogne (born 3 May 1971 in Épernay) is a French sprint canoeist who competed in the early 1990s. She was eliminated in the semifinals of K-4 500 m event at the 1992 Summer Olympics in Barcelona.
