= Wen Yanfang =

Chinese canoeist

Personal information
- Born: October 20, 1966 (age 59)
- Height: 172 cm (5 ft 8 in)
- Weight: 71 kg (157 lb)
Medal record
Women's canoe sprint
Representing China
World Championships
Bronze medal – third place	1991 Paris	K-4 500 m
Asian Games
Gold medal – first place	1990 Beijing	K-4 500 m

Wen Yanfang (文艳芳, born October 20, 1966) is a Chinese sprint canoer who competed in the early 1990s. She won a bronze medal in the K-4 500 m event at the 1991 ICF Canoe Sprint World Championships in Paris.

Wen also finished fifth in the K-4 500 m event at the 1992 Summer Olympics in Barcelona, Spain.
