= Ivana Vokurková =

Czechoslovak sprint canoer (born 1971)

Ivana Vokurková (born January 4, 1971) is a Czechoslovak sprint canoer who competed in the early 1990s. She was eliminated in the semifinals of the K-4 500 m event at the 1992 Summer Olympics in Barcelona.
