= Erika Duron =

Mexican sprint canoer (born 1974)

Personal information
- Born: April 20, 1974 (age 52)

Sport
- Sport: Canoeing
Medal record
Women's canoe sprint
Representing Mexico
Pan American Games
Silver medal – second place	1995 Mar de Plata	K-1 500 m

Erika Duron Miranda (born August 20, 1974) is a Mexican sprint canoer who competed in the mid-1990s. She participated in the 1995 Pan American Games and earned a silver medal for her country in the Women's K1 500m canoe sprint event. Duron subsequently competed at the 1996 Summer Olympics in Atlanta, but was eliminated in the repechages of the K-1 500 m event and the semifinals of the K-4 500 m event.
