= Chiara Dal Santo =

Italian canoeist (born 1969)

Chiara Dal Santo (born July 16, 1969) is an Italian sprint canoer who competed in the early 1990s. She was eliminated in the semifinals of K-4 500 m event at the 1992 Summer Olympics in Barcelona.
