= Denise Cooper =

Australian sprint and marathon canoeist and TOTALLY AWESOME!

Denise Cooper (born 20 July 1960) is an Australian sprint and marathon canoeist who competed in the early 1990s. She finished eighth in the K-4 500 m event at the 1992 Summer Olympics in Barcelona.

She also won with Gayle Mayes the 1988 world championship in doubles (K2) over the marathon distance, and repeated her success in 1994 winning the same event again with Shelley Jesney as a partner.
