= Wang Jing (canoeist) =

Chinese canoeist

Medal record

Women's canoe sprint

World Championships
Bronze medal – third place	1991 Paris	K-4 500 m

Wang Jing (Chinese: 汪静, born December 22, 1971) is a Chinese sprint canoeist who competed in the early 1990s. She won a bronze medal in the K-4 500 m event at the 1991 ICF Canoe Sprint World Championships in Paris.

Wang also finished fifth in the K-4 500 m event at the 1992 Summer Olympics in Barcelona.
