= Canoeing at the 1996 Summer Olympics – Women's K-1 500 metres =

Women's K-1 500 metres at the Games of the XXVI Olympiad
- Venue: Lake Lanier
- Dates: 31 July 1996 (heats & repechage); 2 August 1996 (semifinals); 4 August 1996 (final)
- Competitors: 23 from 23 nations
- Winning time: 1:47.655

Medalists
1st place, gold medalist(s)		Rita Kőbán	Hungary
2nd place, silver medalist(s)		Caroline Brunet	Canada
3rd place, bronze medalist(s)		Josefa Idem	Italy

The women's K-1 500 metres event was an individual kayaking event conducted as part of the Canoeing at the 1996 Summer Olympics program.

== Medalists ==
Gold	Silver	Bronze
Rita Kőbán (HUN)	Caroline Brunet (CAN)	Josefa Idem (ITA)

== Results ==
=== Heats ===
23 competitors entered in three heats. The top three finishers in each heat advanced to the semifinals while the rest competed in the repechages.

Heat 1
1.	Josefa Idem (ITA)	1:50.303	QS
2.	Rita Kőbán (HUN)	1:50.423	QS
3.	Susanne Gunnarsson (SWE)	1:52.943	QS
4.	Aneta Pastuszka (POL)	1:54.015	QR
5.	Anna Michaut (FRA)	1:57.623	QR
6.	Lior Carmi (ISR)	1:57.675	QR
7.	Gao Beibei (CHN)	1:59.943	QR
8.	Traci Phillips (USA)	2:02.847	QR
Heat 2
1.	Ursula Profanter (AUT)	1:51.440	QS
2.	Caroline Brunet (CAN)	1:53.024	QS
3.	Birgit Fischer (GER)	1:54.880	QS
4.	Sayuri Maruyama (JPN)	1:58.160	QR
5.	Ingrid Haralamow (SUI)	1:58.520	QR
6.	Erika Duron (MEX)	1:58.884	QR
7.	Irina Lyalina (UZB)	1:59.996	QR
8.	Heidi Lehrer (ANT)	3:00.672	QR
Heat 3
1.	Katrin Borchert (AUS)	1:53.767	QS
2.	Ruth Nortje (RSA)	1:54.695	QS
3.	Belén Sánchez (ESP)	1:55.043	QS
4.	Delphine Van de Venne (BEL)	1:57.363	QR
5.	Andrea Dallaway (GBR)	1:58.531	QR
6.	Raluca Ioniţǎ (ROU)	2:00.059	QR
7.	Pavlina Jobánková (CZE)	2:07.811	QR

=== Repechages ===
Two repechages were held. The top four finishers in each repechage and the fastest fifth-place finisher advanced to the semifinals.

Repechage 1
1.	Ingrid Haralamow (SUI)	1:57.891	QS
2.	Aneta Pastuszka (POL)	1:58.359	QS
3.	Delphine Van de Venne (BEL)	1:59.027	QS
4.	Gao Beibei (CHN)	1:59.095	QS
5.	Traci Phillips (USA)	2:00.371	QS
6.	Erika Duron (MEX)	2:02.847
7.	Pavlina Jobánková (CZE)	2:12.219
Repechage 2
1.	Sayuri Maruyama (JPN)	2:04.829	QS
2.	Andrea Dallaway (GBR)	2:04.885	QS
3.	Anna Michaut (FRA)	2:05.477	QS
4.	Lior Carmi (ISR)	2:05.737	QS
5.	Irina Lyalina (UZB)	2:08.017
6.	Raluca Ioniţǎ (ROU)	2:11.941

Lehrer did not participate in the repechage.

=== Semifinals ===
Two semifinals were held. The top four finishers in each semifinal and the fastest fifth-place finisher advanced to the final.

Semifinal 1
1.	Rita Kőbán (HUN)	1:48.842	QF
2.	Susanne Gunnarsson (SWE)	1:49.886	QF
3.	Ursula Profanter (AUT)	1:50.066	QF
4.	Ingrid Haralamow (SUI)	1:50.830	QF
5.	Katrin Borchert (AUS)	1:51.142	QF
6.	Belén Sánchez (ESP)	1:52.322
7.	Andrea Dallaway (GBR)	1:55.842
8.	Anna Michaut (FRA)	1:55.930
9.	Gao Beibei (CHN)	1:57.948
Semifinal 2
1.	Josefa Idem (ITA)	1:49.079	QF
2.	Caroline Brunet (CAN)	1:49.575	QF
3.	Birgit Fischer (GER)	1:51.863	QF
4.	Aneta Pastuszka (POL)	1:53.255	QF
5.	Ruth Nortje (RSA)	1:53.611
6.	Delphine Van de Venne (BEL)	1:54.687
7.	Lior Carmi (ISR)	1:54.899
8.	Sayuri Maruyama (JPN)	1:54.943
9.	Traci Phillips (USA)	1:55.339

=== Final ===
The final was held on August 4.

Gold	Rita Kőbán (HUN)	1:47.655
Silver	Caroline Brunet (CAN)	1:47.891
Bronze	Josefa Idem (ITA)	1:48.731
4.	Birgit Fischer (GER)	1:49.383
5.	Susanne Gunnarsson (SWE)	1:49.591
6.	Ursula Profanter (AUT)	1:50.271
7.	Katrin Borchert (AUS)	1:50.811
8.	Ingrid Haralamow (SUI)	1:50.875
9.	Aneta Pastuszka (POL)	1:52.451

Three of the finalists (Borchert, Fischer, and Idem) were German-born, but Idem competed for Italy following the 1988 Summer Olympics while Borchert competed for Australia after the 1992 Summer Olympics. Pastuszka was the only finalist under 27 years of age. Kőbán overtook Brunet in the final 50 meters of the event to take the gold medal.
