= Carmen Simion =

Romanian sprint canoer (born 1970)

Medal record

Women's canoe sprint

World Championships
| Bronze medal – third place | 1993 Copenhagen | K-2 5000 m |

Carmen Simion (born May 5, 1970) is a Romanian sprint canoer who competed in the early 1990s. She won a bronze medal in the K-2 5000 m event at the 1993 ICF Canoe Sprint World Championships in Copenhagen.

Simion also at the 1992 Summer Olympics in Barcelona, finishing fourth in both the K-2 500 m and the K-4 500 m events.
