= Keiko Muto =

Japanese canoeist

Personal information
- Born: 15 February 1972 (age 54) Kanagawa, Japan
- Height: 169 cm (5 ft 7 in)
- Weight: 65 kg (143 lb)

Sport
- Club: Shonan Canoe Sport Club
Medal record
Women's canoe sprint
Representing Japan
Asian Games
Silver medal – second place	1994 Hiroshima	K-2 500 m
Bronze medal – third place	1994 Hiroshima	K-4 500 m

Keiko Muto (武藤恵子, Mūto Keiko; born 15 February 1972) is a Japanese sprint canoer who competed in the early to mid-1990s. At the 1992 Summer Olympics in Barcelona, she was eliminated in the semifinals of the K-2 500 m event. Four years later in Atlanta, Muto was eliminated in the semifinals of the K-4 500 m event.
