= Claudia Nicula =

Romanian sprint canoer (born 1973)

Claudia Nicula (born October 12, 1973) is a Romanian sprint canoer who competed in the early 1990s. She finished fourth in the K-4 500 m event at the 1992 Summer Olympics in Barcelona.
