= Hilary Dresser =

British sprint canoeist

- Born: 12 April 1968 (age 57); Stuttgart, Germany
- Occupation: canoeist

Hilary Dresser (born 12 April 1968) is a British sprint canoeist who competed in the early 1980s and 1990s.

== Early life ==
She attended Port Regis School, a prep school in Dorset, and trained with the Royal Canoe Club.

In 1992 she studied Business at Kingston University. In 1995 she was the sports and fitness manager of Seeboard.

== Canoeing ==
She reached the semifinals of the K-4 500 m event at the 1992 Summer Olympics in Barcelona. She retired in 1996 from competing in sprint and marathon kayaking at a national level.
