= Nina Bergsvik =

Norwegian sprint canoer (born 1973)

Nina Bergsvik (born July 21, 1973 in Bergen) is a Norwegian sprint canoer who competed in the early 1990s. She was eliminated in the semifinals of the K-4 500 m event at the 1992 Summer Olympics in Barcelona.
