= Amalia Calzavara =

Italian canoeist (born 1966)

Amalia Calzavara (born 2 April 1966) is an Italian sprint canoeist who competed in the early 1990s. She was eliminated in the semifinals of K-4 500 m event at the 1992 Summer Olympics in Barcelona.
