= Lucia Micheli =

Italian canoeist (born 1969)

Lucia Micheli (born 4 April 1969) is an Italian sprint canoer who competed in the early 1990s. She was eliminated in the semifinals of K-4 500 m event at the 1992 Summer Olympics in Barcelona.

Micheli is the wife of fellow Italian sprint canoer Antonio Rossi.
