= Pelsall Comprehensive School =

Secondary school in England

Pelsall Comprehensive School was a secondary school located in Pelsall, an area of the Metropolitan Borough of Walsall in the West Midlands of England.

It opened in September 1963 as Pelsall Secondary Modern (serving pupils aged 11 upwards), becoming a 13–18 comprehensive school in September 1972 under a local reorganisation of education by Aldridge-Brownhills council, which would be absorbed into the Walsall borough two years later. The age range was altered to 11–18 from September 1986, when Walsall MBC decided to abolish the three-tier system in the former Aldridge-Brownhills part of the borough and bring the area's schools into line with the rest of Walsall.

A new Science block was added in the mid 1970s.

Due to falling pupil numbers, the school closed in July 1994 after serving the community of Pelsall for 31 years.

Eighteen months before its closure, the school suffered a tragedy when 13-year-old pupil Donna Cooper was killed by a speeding stolen car near the school on 6 January 1993. The driver of the car, 17-year-old Carl Sherwood from Goscote, was found guilty of manslaughter later that year and sentenced to seven years in youth custody but was released in September 1997. His accomplice, 26-year-old Blakenall Heath man Nigel Button, received a 4 1/2-year sentence (later reduced by a year on appeal) for two charges of aggravated vehicle taking. Three other teenage occupants of the car received supervision orders.

The buildings are now home to Rushall JMI School, Education Walsall offices and a teacher training centre. The playing fields have remained intact.

== Notable former pupils ==
- Andrea Dallaway, canoeist at the 1988, 1992 and 1996 Olympics
