= Tone Rasmussen =

Norwegian canoeist (born 1968)

Tone Rasmussen (born April 1, 1968) is a Norwegian sprint canoer who competed in the early 1990s. She was eliminated in the semifinals of the K-4 500 m event at the 1992 Summer Olympics in Barcelona.
