= Vladimíra Havelková =

Czechoslovak sprint canoer (born 1966)

Vladimíra Havelková (born 29 June 1966 in Znojmo) is a Czechoslovak sprint canoer who competed in the early 1990s. She was eliminated in the semifinals of the K-4 500 m event at the 1992 Summer Olympics in Barcelona.
