= Annacatia Casagrande =

Italian canoeist (born 1964)

Annacatia Casagrande (born 1 April 1964) is an Italian sprint canoeist who competed in the early 1990s. She was eliminated in the semifinals of K-4 500 m event at the 1992 Summer Olympics in Barcelona.
