= Zhao Xiaoli (canoeist) =

Chinese canoeist (born 1971)

Personal information
- Born: August 15, 1971 (age 55)
- Height: 172 cm (5 ft 8 in)
- Weight: 69 kg (152 lb)
Medal record
Women's canoe sprint
Representing China
Asian Games
Gold medal – first place	1994 Hiroshima	K-2 500 m

Zhao Xiaoli (赵晓丽, born August 15, 1971) is a Chinese sprint canoer who competed in the early 1990s. At the 1992 Summer Olympics in Barcelona, she finished fifth in the K-4 500 m event and seventh in the K-2 500 m event.
