= Rita Kőbán =

Hungarian canoeist (born 1965)

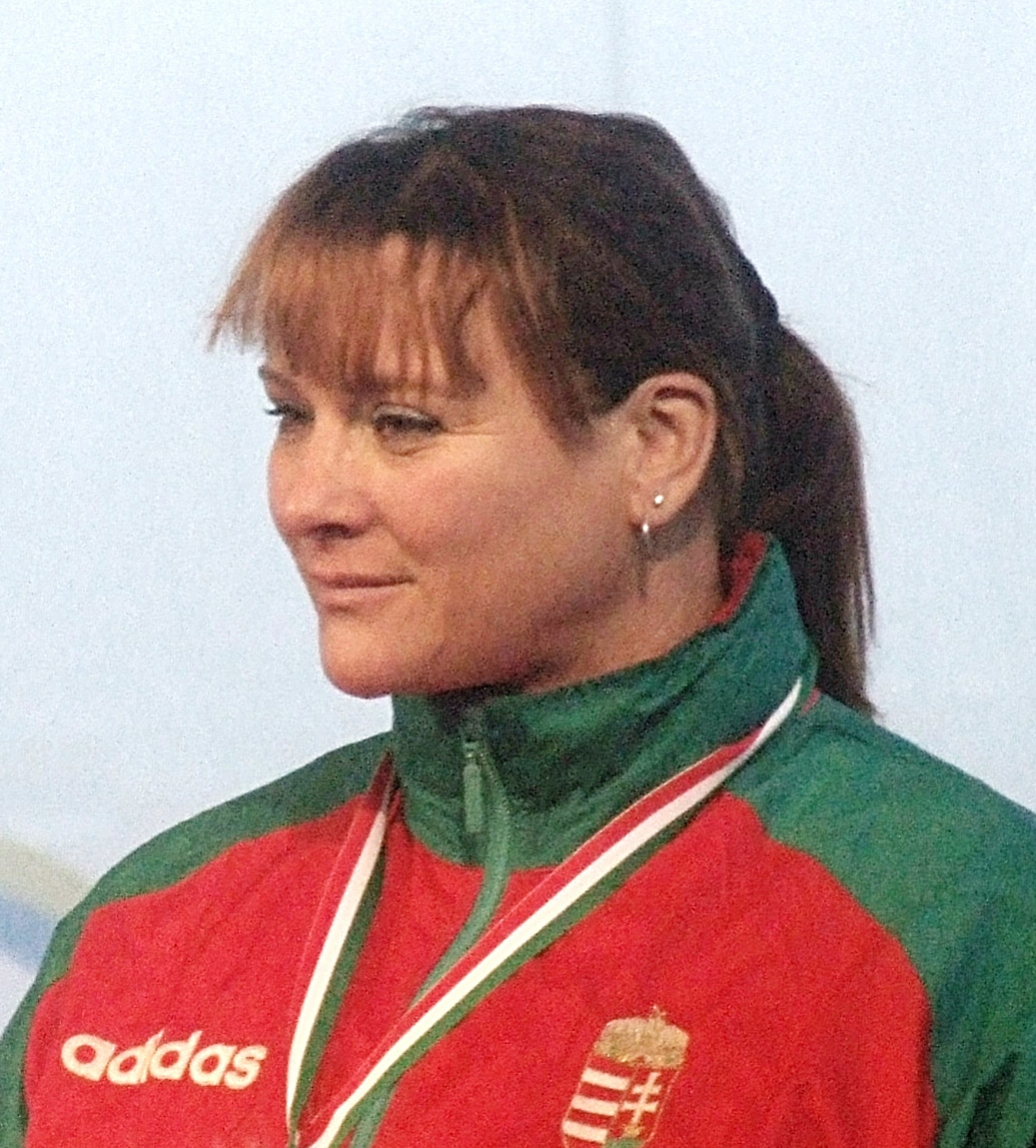

Personal information
- Born: 10 April 1965 (age 61) Budapest, Hungary
- Height: 174 cm (5 ft 9 in)
- Weight: 69 kg (152 lb)

Sport
- Sport: Canoe sprint
- Club: Csepel SC, Budapest; Újpesti TE, Budapest
Medal record
Representing Hungary
Olympic Games
Gold medal – first place	1992 Barcelona	K-4 500 m
Gold medal – first place	1996 Atlanta	K-1 500 m
Silver medal – second place	1988 Seoul	K-4 500 m
Silver medal – second place	1992 Barcelona	K-1 500 m
Silver medal – second place	2000 Sydney	K-4 500 m
Bronze medal – third place	1992 Barcelona	K-2 500 m
World Championships
Gold medal – first place	1986 Montreal	K-4 500 m
Gold medal – first place	1994 Mexico City	K-1 200 m
Gold medal – first place	1994 Mexico City	K-2 200 m
Gold medal – first place	1994 Mexico City	K-4 200 m
Gold medal – first place	1995 Duisburg	K-1 200 m
Gold medal – first place	1995 Duisburg	K-1 500 m
Gold medal – first place	1998 Szeged	K-4 200 m
Gold medal – first place	1999 Milan	K-4 200 m
Gold medal – first place	1999 Milan	K-4 500 m
Silver medal – second place	1985 Mechelen	K-2 500 m
Silver medal – second place	1987 Duisburg	K-4 500 m
Silver medal – second place	1989 Plovdiv	K-4 500 m
Silver medal – second place	1990 Poznań	K-4 500 m
Silver medal – second place	1991 Paris	K-1 500 m
Silver medal – second place	1991 Paris	K-4 500 m
Silver medal – second place	1993 Copenhagen	K-1 5000 m
Silver medal – second place	1994 Mexico City	K-1 500 m
Silver medal – second place	1994 Mexico City	K-4 500 m
Silver medal – second place	1998 Szeged	K-2 200 m
Bronze medal – third place	1985 Mechelen	K-4 500 m
Bronze medal – third place	1993 Copenhagen	K-4 500 m
Bronze medal – third place	1995 Duisburg	K-4 500 m
Bronze medal – third place	1998 Szeged	K-2 500 m
Bronze medal – third place	1999 Milan	K-1 200 m
Bronze medal – third place	1999 Milan	K-1 500 m
Bronze medal – third place	1999 Milan	K-2 200 m

Rita Kőbán (born 10 April 1965) is a Hungarian canoe sprinter. She competed at the 1988, 1992, 1996 and 2000 Olympics and won six medals, with two golds (1992: K-4 500 m, 1996: K-1 500 m), three silvers (1988: K-4 500 m, 1992: K-1 500 m, 2000: K-4 500 m), and one bronze (1992: K-2 500 m).

Kőbán has also been successful in the ICF Canoe Sprint World Championships collecting 26 medals. This includes nine golds (K-1 200 m: 1994, 1995; K-1 500 m: 1995, K-2 200 m: 1994, K-4 200 m: 1994, 1998, 1999; K-4 500 m: 1986, 1999), ten silvers (K-1 500 m: 1991, 1994; K-1 5000 m: 1993, K-2 200 m: 1998, K-2 500 m: 1985, K-4 500 m: 1987, 1989, 1990, 1991, 1994), and seven bronzes (K-1 200 m: 1999, K-1 500 m: 1999, K-2 200 m: 1999, K-2 500 m: 1998, K-4 500 m: 1985, 1993, 1995).

She was elected Hungarian Sportswoman of the Year in 1994 and 1995, ending the string of six consecutive titles by Krisztina Egerszegi. After retiring from competitions, she briefly worked as a TV presenter.

Kőbán has been a vegetarian since 1991.

== Awards ==
- Masterly youth athlete: 1982, 1983
- Hungarian kayaker of the Year (7): 1984, 1987, 1991, 1992, 1994, 1995, 1996
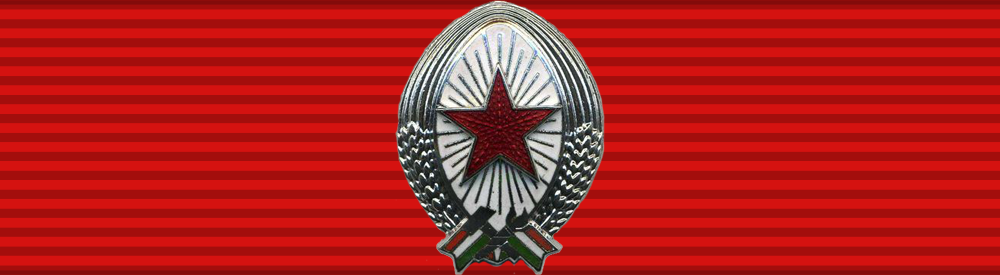
- Work Order of Merit of Hungarian People's Republic – Silver Cross (1988)
- Csepel SC – Athlete of Year (1991, 1993, 1994, 1995, 1996)
- Order of Merit of the Republic of Hungary – Officer's Cross (1992)
- Member of the Hungarian team of year (with Erika Mészáros, Éva Dónusz, Kinga Czigány): 1992
- Perpetual champion of Csepel SC (1994)
- Hungarian Sportwoman of the Year (2) – votes of sports journalists: 1994, 1995
- MOB Golden ring (1995)
- Honorary Citizen of Csepel (1996)
- Order of Merit of the Republic of Hungary – Commander's Cross (1996)
- Hungarian Heritage Award (1999)
- Príma Primissima award (2016)

Awards
Preceded by Krisztina Egerszegi	Hungarian Sportswoman of The Year; 1994–1995	Succeeded by Krisztina Egerszegi
