= Kevyn Stafford =

Canadian canoeist (born 1964)

Kevyn Stafford (born May 29, 1964 in Kitimat) is a Canadian sprint canoer who competed in the early 1990s. She finished sixth in the K-4 500 m event at the 1992 Summer Olympics in Barcelona.
