= Sandra Troop =

British canoeist

Sandra Elaine Troop (born 15 March 1966 in Lincoln) is a British canoe sprinter and marathon canoeist who competed in the early 1990s.

== Early life ==
She attended Lincoln Christ's Hospital School, and Trent Polytechnic.

She competed at the 1987 World Student Games in Zagreb (1987 Summer Universiade). She was a school teacher when at the Olympics in 1992.

== Career ==
She was eliminated in the semifinals of the K-4 500 m event at the 1992 Summer Olympics in Barcelona.
