= Gayle Mayes =

Australian sprint and marathon canoeist (born 1956)

Gayle Joy Mayes (born 30 December 1956) is an Australian sprint and marathon canoeist who competed in the early 1990s. She was a member of Australian Women Canoeing team at the 1992 Summer Olympics in Barcelona and finished in 8th place at the K-4 500 m event.

Later on, she received a PhD in Tourism from the University of the Sunshine Coast in 2009. Since 2000, she has been a lecturer at the University of the Sunshine Coast in Queensland, where she teaches in Tourism, Leisure & Events Management and Sport Marketing.
