= Anne Michaut =

French canoeist

Anne Michaut (born 11 November 1972 in Gray, Haute-Saône) is a French sprint canoeist.

== Career ==
Michaut competed in the early to mid-1990s. She was eliminated in the semifinals of K-4 500 m event at the 1992 Summer Olympics in Barcelona. Four years later in Atlanta, Michaut was eliminated in the semifinals of the K-1 500 m event.
