= Dene Simpson =

South African sprint canoer

Dene Simpson (born 24 August 1956) is a South African canoe sprinter who competed in the early 1990s. At the 1992 Summer Olympics in Barcelona, she was eliminated in the semifinals of both the K-1 500 m and the K-2 500 m event.
