= Hege Brannsten =

Norwegian canoeist

Hege Brannsten (born December 26, 1972) is a Norwegian sprint canoer who competed in the early 1990s. At the 1992 Summer Olympics in Barcelona, she was eliminated in the semifinals of both the K-2 500 m and the K-4 500 m events.
