= Delphine Vandevenne =

Belgian sprint canoer

Delphine Vandevenne (born 14 December 1974 in Kortrijk) is a Belgian police officer who competed as a canoe sprinter in the mid-1990s. At the 1996 Summer Olympics in Atlanta, she was eliminated in the repechages of the K-1 500 m event.
