= List of Olympic gold medalists in swimming by count =

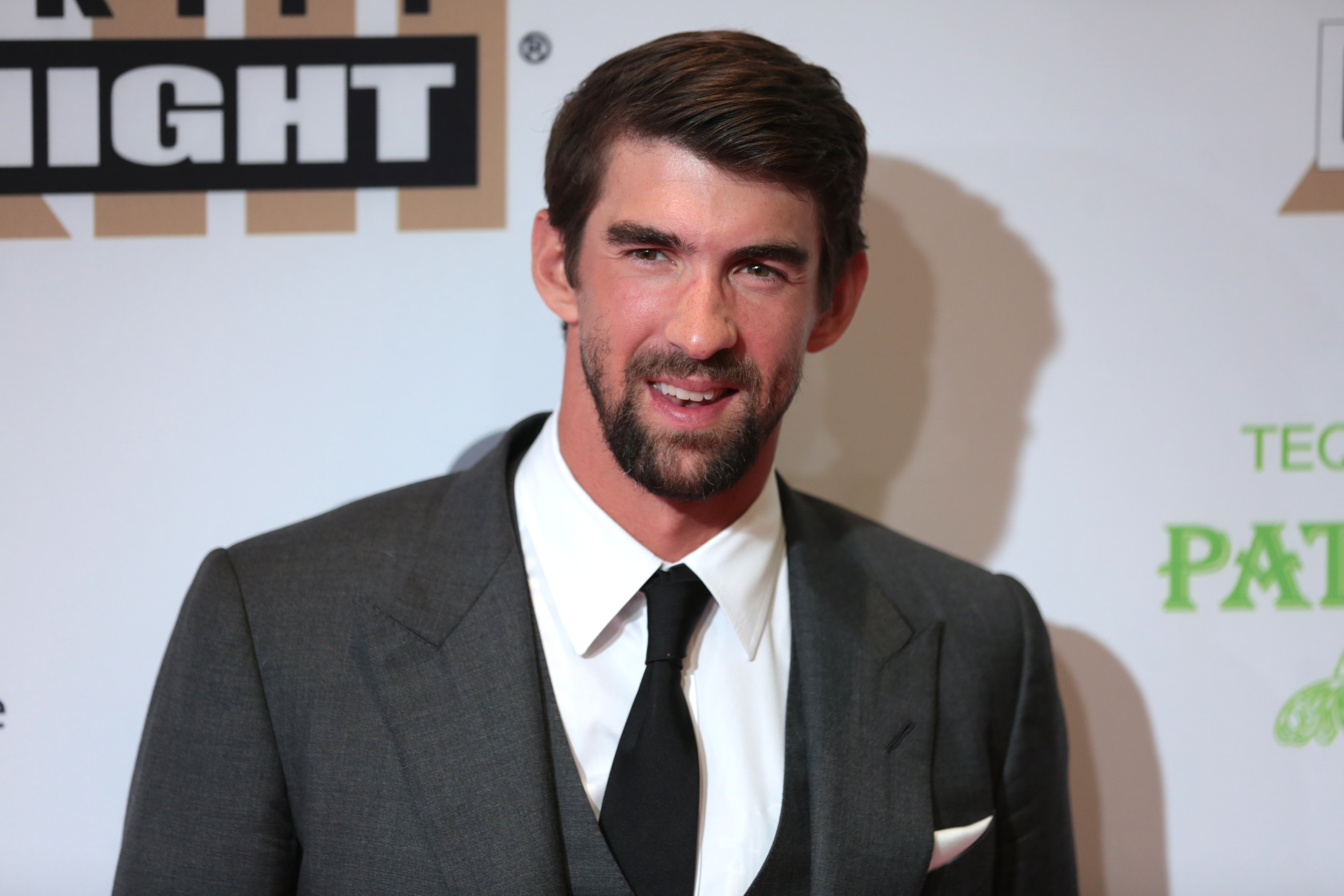
Michael Phelps in 2017.

This is the top 15 male Olympic swimming gold medals.

| | Name | Gold | Silver | Bronze | Total |
|---|---|---|---|---|---|
| 1. | (United States) Michael Phelps | 23 | 3 | 2 | 28 |
| 2. | (United States) Mark Spitz | 9 | 1 | 1 | 11 |
| 3. | (United States) Caeleb Dressel | 9 | 1 | 0 | 10 |
| 4. | (United States) Matt Biondi | 8 | 2 | 1 | 11 |
| 5. | (United States) Ryan Lochte | 6 | 3 | 3 | 12 |
| 6. | (United States) Gary Hall, Jr. | 5 | 3 | 2 | 10 |
| 7. | (Australia) Ian Thorpe | 5 | 3 | 1 | 9 |
| 8. | (United States) Ryan Murphy | 5 | 2 | 2 | 9 |
| 9. | (United States) Aaron Peirsol | 5 | 2 | 0 | 7 |
| 10. | (United States) Nathan Adrian | 5 | 1 | 2 | 8 |
| 11. | (United States) Tom Jager | 5 | 1 | 1 | 7 |
| 12. | (United States) Don Schollander | 5 | 1 | 0 | 6 |
| 13. | (United States) Johnny Weissmuller | 5 | 0 | 0 | 5 |
| 14. | (Russia) Alexander Popov | 4 | 5 | 0 | 9 |
| 15. | (East Germany) Roland Matthes | 4 | 2 | 2 | 8 |
| 15. | (United States) Jason Lezak | 4 | 2 | 2 | 8 |

This is the top 15 female Olympic swimming gold medalists:

| | Name | Gold | Silver | Bronze | Total |
|---|---|---|---|---|---|
| 1. | (United States) Katie Ledecky | 9 | 4 | 1 | 14 |
| 2. | (United States) Jenny Thompson | 8 | 3 | 1 | 12 |
| 3. | (Australia) Emma McKeon | 6 | 3 | 5 | 14 |
| 4. | (East Germany) Kristin Otto | 6 | 0 | 0 | 6 |
| 4. | (United States) Amy Van Dyken | 6 | 0 | 0 | 6 |
| 6. | (Australia) Kaylee McKeown | 5 | 1 | 3 | 9 |
| 7. | (Australia) Mollie O'Callaghan | 5 | 1 | 2 | 8 |
| 8. | (Hungary) Krisztina Egerszegi | 5 | 1 | 1 | 7 |
| 8. | (United States) Dana Vollmer | 5 | 1 | 1 | 7 |
| 10. | (United States) Missy Franklin | 5 | 0 | 1 | 6 |
| 11. | (United States) Dara Torres | 4 | 4 | 4 | 12 |
| 12. | (Australia) Dawn Fraser | 4 | 4 | 0 | 8 |
| 12. | (East Germany) Kornelia Ender | 4 | 4 | 0 | 8 |
| 14. | (United States) Allison Schmitt | 4 | 3 | 3 | 10 |
| 15. | (Australia) Ariarne Titmus | 4 | 3 | 1 | 8 |

== Individual events ==
All swimmers with at least four individual gold medals are listed

Men

| | Name | Gold | Silver | Bronze | Total |
|---|---|---|---|---|---|
| 1. | (United States) Michael Phelps | 13 | 2 | 1 | 16 |
| 2. | (United States) Mark Spitz | 4 | 1 | 1 | 6 |
| 3. | (Russia) Alexander Popov | 4 | 1 | 0 | 5 |
| 4. | (East Germany) Roland Matthes | 4 | 0 | 1 | 5 |
| 5. | (Hungary) Tamás Darnyi | 4 | 0 | 0 | 4 |
| 5. | (Japan) Kosuke Kitajima | 4 | 0 | 0 | 4 |
| 5. | (France) Léon Marchand | 4 | 0 | 0 | 4 |

Women

| | Name | Gold | Silver | Bronze | Total |
|---|---|---|---|---|---|
| 1. | (United States) Katie Ledecky | 8 | 1 | 1 | 10 |
| 2. | (Hungary) Krisztina Egerszegi | 5 | 1 | 1 | 7 |
| 3. | (Netherlands) Inge de Bruijn | 4 | 1 | 1 | 6 |
| 4. | (United States) Janet Evans | 4 | 1 | 0 | 5 |
| 4. | (Ukraine) Yana Klochkova | 4 | 1 | 0 | 5 |
| 6. | (Australia) Kaylee McKeown | 4 | 0 | 1 | 5 |
| 7. | (East Germany) Kristin Otto | 4 | 0 | 0 | 4 |

== See also ==
- List of World Aquatics Championships medalists in swimming (men)
- List of World Aquatics Championships medalists in swimming (women)
- List of Olympic medalists in swimming (men)
- List of Olympic medalists in swimming (women)
- List of individual gold medalists in swimming at the Olympics and World Aquatics Championships (men)
- List of individual gold medalists in swimming at the Olympics and World Aquatics Championships (women)
- List of gold medalist relay teams in swimming at the Olympics and World Aquatics Championships
- European Aquatics Championships – Multiple medalists in swimming
