= Lesley Carstens =

South African sprint canoer

Lesley Carstens (born 6 April 1965) is a South African canoe sprinter who competed in the early 1990s. At the 1992 Summer Olympics in Barcelona, she was eliminated in the semifinals of the K-2 500 m event.
