= Canoeing at the 1992 Summer Olympics – Women's K-2 500 metres =

The women's K-2 500 metres event was a pairs kayaking event conducted as part of the Canoeing at the 1992 Summer Olympics program.

== Medalists ==
Gold	Silver	Bronze
Ramona Portwich and Anke von Seck (GER)	Agneta Andersson and Susanne Gunnarsson (SWE)	Rita Kőbán and Éva Dónusz (HUN)

== Results ==
=== Heats ===
18 crews entered in three heats. These rounds were used for seeding in the semifinals.

Heat 1
1.	Ramona Portwich and Anke von Seck (GER)	1:41.82
2.	Rita Kőbán and Éva Dónusz (HUN)	1:42.54
3.	Sanda Toma and Carmen Simion (ROU)	1:44.26
4.	Anna Wood and Kerri Randle (AUS)	1:44.76
5.	Jeanette Knudsen and Yvonne Knudsen (DEN)	1:45.82
6.	Belén Sánchez and Joaquina Costa (ESP)	1:46.64
7.	Hege Brannsten and Ingeborg Rasmussen (NOR)	1:49.58
Heat 2
1.	Agneta Andersson and Susanne Gunnarsson (SWE)	1:42.23
2.	Zhao Xiaoli and Ning Menghua (CHN)	1:43.07
3.	Pavlína Jobánková and Jitka Janáčková (TCH)	1:47.66
4.	Miyuki Kobayashi and Keiko Muto (JPN)	1:48.40
5.	Bonka Pindzheva and Mariya Kichukova (BUL)	1:50.04
Heat 3
1.	Alison Herst and Klara MacAskill (CAN)	1:43.73
2.	Izabela Dylewska and Elżbieta Urbańczyk (POL)	1:45.19
3.	Sabine Goetschy and Bernadette Brégeon (FRA)	1:47.66
4.	Irina Samoylova and Galina Savenko (EUN)	1:46.06
5.	Lesley Carstens and Dene Simpson (RSA)	1:52.02
6.	Cathy Marino-Geers and Traci Phillips (USA)	1:53.52

=== Semifinals ===
The top four finishers in each semifinal and the fastest fifth-place finisher advanced to the final.

Semifinal 1
1.	Ramona Portwich and Anke von Seck (GER)	1:40.50	QF
2.	Alison Herst and Klara MacAskill (CAN)	1:42.30	QF
3.	Sanda Toma and Carmen Simion (ROU)	1:42.35	QF
4.	Zhao Xiaoli and Ning Menghua (CHN)	1:42.86	QF
5.	Jeanette Knudsen and Yvonne Knudsen (DEN)	1:43.58	QF
6.	Sabine Goetschy and Bernadette Brégeon (FRA)	1:43.61
7.	Anna Wood and Kerri Randle (AUS)	1:44.05
8.	Irina Samoylova and Galina Savenko (EUN)	1:45.20
9.	Miyuki Kobayashi and Keiko Muto (JPN)	1:46.38
Semifinal 2
1.	Rita Kőbán and Éva Dónusz (HUN)	1:40.63	QF
2.	Agneta Andersson and Susanne Gunnarsson (SWE)	1:41.08	QF
3.	Izabela Dylewska and Elżbieta Urbańczyk (POL)	1:43.50	QF
4.	Belén Sánchez and Joaquina Costa (ESP)	1:53.37	QF
5.	Cathy Marino-Geers and Traci Phillips (USA)	1:45.50
6.	Pavlína Jobánková and Jitka Janáčková (TCH)	1:45.95
7.	Hege Brannsten and Ingeborg Rasmussen (NOR)	1:47.48
8.	Bonka Pindzheva and Mariya Kichukova (BUL)	1:50.28
9.	Lesley Carstens and Dene Simpson (RSA)	1:54.80

=== Final ===
The final was held on August 7.

Gold	Ramona Portwich and Anke von Seck (GER)	1:40.29
Silver	Agneta Andersson and Susanne Gunnarsson (SWE)	1:40.41
Bronze	Rita Kőbán and Éva Dónusz (HUN)	1:40.81
4.	Sanda Toma and Carmen Simion (ROU)	1:42.12
5.	Alison Herst and Klara MacAskill (CAN)	1:42.14
6.	Izabela Dylewska and Elżbieta Urbańczyk (POL)	1:42.44
7.	Zhao Xiaoli and Ning Menghua (CHN)	1:42.46
8.	Jeanette Knudsen and Yvonne Knudsen (DEN)	1:43.98
9.	Belén Sánchez and Joaquina Costa (ESP)	1:44.96
