= Joaquina Costa =

Spanish canoeist

Joaquina Costa Iglesias (born March 24, 1967, in Pontevedra) is a Spanish sprint canoer who competed in the early 1990s. At the 1992 Summer Olympics in Barcelona, she finished ninth the K-2 500 m event while being eliminated in the semifinals of the K-4 500 m event.
