= Lasak (surname) =

Lasak is a surname. Notable people with the surname include:

- Françoise Lasak (born 1968), French sprint canoeist
- Ján Lašák (born 1979), Slovak ice hockey player
- Matěj Lasák (born 1992), Czech cyclist
- Olivier Lasak (born 1967), French sprint canoeist
