= Luisa Álvarez =

Spanish canoeist

Luisa María Álvarez Iglesias (born October 3, 1962 in Candás) is a Spanish sprint canoer who competed in the early 1990s. She was eliminated in the semifinals of the K-4 500 m event at the 1992 Summer Olympics in Barcelona.
