= Márta Egerváry =

Hungarian swimmer (born 1943)

Personal information
- Full name: Egerváry Márta
- Nationality: Hungarian
- Born: 24 March 1943 (age 83) Budapest
- Height: 1.63 m (5 ft 4 in)
- Weight: 66 kg (146 lb)

Sport
- Sport: Swimming
- Strokes: freestyle
- Club: Ferencvárosi TC
Medal record
European Championships (LC)
Bronze medal – third place	1962 Leipzig	400 m medley
Summer Universiade
Gold medal – first place	1965 Budapest	100 m butterfly
Gold medal – first place	1963 Porto Alegre	200 m breaststroke
Gold medal – first place	1963 Porto Alegre	100 m butterfly
Bronze medal – third place	1965 Budapest	200 m breaststroke

Márta Egerváry (born 24 March 1943, in Budapest) is a former freestyle and medley swimmer from Hungary, who competed in three consecutive Summer Olympics for her native country, starting in 1960.

Her best individual result was eighth, achieved at the 1964 Olympic Games in 400 m medley. With the Hungarian 4x100 metres medley relay team she was sixth in 1960.

At the European Championships she won a bronze medal in 1962 in 400 m medley for which she was chosen Hungarian Sportswoman of The Year.

Awards
Preceded by Kornélia Pap	Hungarian Sportswoman of The Year; 1962	Succeeded by Ildikó Rejtő
