= Mount Kinka =

Mount Kinka (金華山, Kinkazan; Kinkasan) refers to one of two mountains in Japan:

- Mount Kinka (Gifu), located in Gifu, Gifu Prefecture, formerly known as Mount Inaba
- Mount Kinka (Miyagi), located on the island of Kinkasan in Miyagi Prefecture
