= Klara MacAskill =

Hungarian-born, Canadian sprint kayaker (born 1964)

Medal record

Women's canoe sprint

World Championships
Bronze medal – third place	1994 Mexico City	K-4 200 m

Klara MacAskill (born December 31, 1964, in Budapest) is a Hungarian-born, Canadian sprint kayaker who competed in the early to mid-1990s.

== Accomplishments ==
MacAskill won a bronze medal in the K-4 200 m event at the 1994 ICF Canoe Sprint World Championships in Mexico City.

She also competed in two Summer Olympics, earning her best finish of fifth on two occasions (1992: K-2 500 m, 1996: K-4 500 m).
