= Susana Torrejón =

Spanish sprint canoer (born 1960)

Susana Torrejón (born 6 May 1960) is a Spanish sprint canoeist who competed in the early 1990s. At the 1992 Summer Olympics in Barcelona, she was eliminated in the semifinals of the K-1 500 m event.
