= Françoise Lasak =

French sprint canoer (born 1968)

Françoise Lasak (born 6 May 1968 in Besançon) is a French sprint canoeist who competed in the early 1990s. She was eliminated in the semifinals of K-4 500 m event at the 1992 Summer Olympics in Barcelona.
