= Tamás Széchy =

Hungarian swimming coach (1931–2004)

- Born: 27 March 1931; Doboz
- Died: 13 September 2004 (aged 73)
- Occupation: Swimming trainer

Tamás Széchy (Doboz, 27 March 1931, Budapest – 13 September 2004) was a Hungarian swimming trainer.

== Life ==
He came into contact with swimming in 1962, when he started working for the water polo team of the Central Sports and Youth Association (KSI) at the request of Dezső Gyarmati. In January 1967, he founded the KSI swimming department, of which he became head coach until 1976. His method was to visit the surrounding schools, look for those who wanted to swim, and work with the more talented ones separately. They trained in the 25-meter pool of the Császár Bath. András Hargitay stood out from this team, who was first recognized at the international level at the European Youth Championships, where he became a two-time champion. The first Olympic success is also linked to Hargitay, who won a bronze medal in the 400 m individual medley at the 1972 Summer Olympics.

In 1969, he organized the age group competition system for swimming in Hungary (the so-called age group system). In the early 1970s, the successes came continuously, and Széchy's students (primarily Hargitay and Verrasztó) brought home medals from every international competition. The first Olympic gold medal can be attributed to Sándor Wladár, who won the gold medal in the 200-meter backstroke at the 1980 Moscow Olympics. The real series of successes came at the end of the eighties, when Czene, Darnyi, Rózsa, Szabó and other students continuously brought medals from international competitions.

After KSI, he continued his coaching career as the national captain of the Hungarian swimming team in 1976, and then worked as the head coach of the men's swimming team between 1977 and 1999, and was its national captain until 2000.

From 1977 he was the coach of Budapest Honvéd, then Újpesti Dózsa, and then between 1991 and 1993 he worked as the coach of Budapest Police SE. In 1993 he was elected vice-president of the Hungarian Swimming Association and became the national captain of the men's national team again.

By the end of the 1990's, he had grown tired of his activities, and the remaining members of the association had retired or continued their work with other teams. For a while he continued to visit the Komjádi swimming pool, helping the young people (for example, he predicted the successes of Dávid Verrasztó and Dániel Gyurta).

He retired from coaching in 2000. He died at home in 2004, a few weeks after Gyurta's success in Athens.

== Allegations of sexual abuse ==
His former student Tamás Füzesy stated that he was sexually abused by Széchy and that Széchy often verbally and physically abused his students. After the biography Élet – Mű – Örökség (written by András Hargitay, Csaba Sós, and Ákos Tóth) was published about him in May 2025, Tamás Batházi – brother of swimmer István Batházi – said that twenty of Széchy's former students reached out to him regarding their abuses. The Hungarian Swimming Association set up an investigation committee regarding the allegations. The printing of the biography has been halted.

Batházi also claimed that the 1980 Moscow Olympics gold medalist (and president of the Hungarian Swimming Association when the book was published in 2025), Sándor Wladár, had a sexual relationship with Széchy before turning 18. Wladár has denied this, and stated that people should focus on Széchy's legacy instead.
