= Éva Dónusz =

Hungarian canoeist (born 1967)

Medal record

Women's canoe sprint

Olympic Games
Gold medal – first place	1992 Barcelona	K-4 500 m
Bronze medal – third place	1992 Barcelona	K-2 500 m

World Championships
Gold medal – first place	1994 Mexico City	K-4 200 m
Silver medal – second place	1989 Plovdiv	K-2 500 m
Silver medal – second place	1990 Poznań	K-2 500 m
Silver medal – second place	1990 Poznań	K-2 5000 m
Silver medal – second place	1990 Poznań	K-4 500 m
Silver medal – second place	1991 Paris	K-2 500 m
Silver medal – second place	1991 Paris	K-4 500 m
Silver medal – second place	1993 Copenhagen	K-2 5000 m
Silver medal – second place	1994 Mexico City	K-4 500 m
Bronze medal – third place	1993 Copenhagen	K-4 500 m
Bronze medal – third place	1995 Duisburg	K-4 500 m
Bronze medal – third place	1998 Szeged	K-1 200 m

Éva Dónusz (born September 29, 1967) is a Hungarian sprint canoer who competed from the late 1980s to the late 1990s. Competing in two Summer Olympics, she won two medals at Barcelona in 1992 with a gold in the K-4 500 m and a bronze in the K-2 500 m events.

Dónusz also won twelve medals at the ICF Canoe Sprint World Championships with a gold (K-4 200 m: 1994), eight silvers (K-2 500 m: 1989, 1990, 1991; K-2 5000 m: 1990, 1993; K-4 500 m: 1990, 1991, 1994), and three bronzes (K-1 200 m: 1998, K-4 500 m: 1993, 1995).

== Awards ==
- Order of Merit of the Republic of Hungary – Small Cross (1992)
- Hungarian kayaker of the Year (1): 1992
- Member of the Hungarian team of year (with Rita Kőbán, Erika Mészáros, Kinga Czigány): 1992
