= Kinka Racheva =

Bulgarian canoeist

Kinka Beneva Racheva (Bulgarian: Кинка Бенева Рачева) (born May 28, 1973, in Ruse) is a Bulgarian sprint canoer who competed in the early 1990s. She was eliminated in the semifinals of the K-4 500 m event at the 1992 Summer Olympics in Barcelona.
