= Alison Herst =

Canadian canoeist

Medal record

Women's canoe sprint

World Championships
Gold medal – first place	1995 Duisburg	K-4 200 m
Bronze medal – third place	1994 Mexico City	K-4 200 m

Alison Herst (born March 7, 1971) is a Canadian sprint kayaker who competed in the early to mid-1990s. She won two medals in the K-4 200 m event at the ICF Canoe Sprint World Championships with a gold in 1995 and a bronze in 1994. Herst was born in Toronto, Ontario.

Herst also competed in two Summer Olympics, earning her best finish of fifth on two occasions (1992: K-2 500 m, 1996: K-4 500 m).
