= Hungarian Swimming Association =

Sports governing body in Hungary

LEN
- Association crest
- Founded: 1907
- FINA affiliation: xxxx
- LEN affiliation: xxx
- Website: www.musz.hu
- President: Sándor Wladár

Hungarian Swimming Association (Hungarian: Magyar Úszó Szövetség, pronounced [ˈmɒɟɒr ˈuːsoː ˈsøvɛt͡ʃːeːɡ], MÚSZ) is the governing body of swimming association in Hungary. It is a non-profit organization that was founded in 1907 on a meeting at the Hungarian Olympic Committee.

It is affiliated to:

- FINA, the International Swimming Federation
- LEN, the European Swimming League
- MOB, the Hungarian Olympic Committee

== International events hosted ==
World Championships:

- 2017 World Aquatics Championships – Budapest, 14–30 July
- 2022 World Aquatics Championships – Budapest, June 18 – July 3

European Championships:

- 1926 European Aquatics Championships – Budapest, 18–22 August
- 1958 European Aquatics Championships – Budapest, 31 August – 6 September
- 2006 European Aquatics Championships – Budapest, 26 July – 6 August
- 2012 European Aquatics Championships (Swimming) – Debrecen, 21–27 May
- 2007 European Short Course Swimming Championships – Debrecen, 10–13 December
- Swimming at the 2017 European Youth Summer Olympic Festival – Győr
- 2005 European Junior Swimming Championships – Budapest, 14–17 July
- 2016 European Junior Swimming Championships – Hódmezővásárhely, 6–10 July

== International achievements ==
Event	Gold medal	Silver medal	Bronze medal	Pos.
Olympic Games	25	23	18	4th
World Championships	31	24	28	7th
European Championships	106	91	69	4th
World Championships, short course (25m)	10	8	8	13th
European Championships, short course (25m)	53	32	25	8th

=== Olympic Games ===
Year	Host city	No. of swimmers	Gold	Silver	Bronze	Total	
1896	(Greece) Athens	1	2	0	0	2	I.
1900	(France) Paris	1	0	2	1	3	VI.
1904	(United States) St. Louis	2	2	1	1	4	III.
1908	(United Kingdom) London	10	0	2	0	2	IV.
1912	(Sweden) Stockholm	8	0	0	0	0	-
1924	(France) Paris	6	0	0	1	1	VI.
1928	(Netherlands) Amsterdam	8	0	1	0	1	IX.
1932	(United States) Los Angeles	5	0	0	1	1	VII.
1936	(Germany) Berlin	13	1	0	1	2	IV.
1948	(United Kingdom) London	15	0	1	3	4	V.
1952	(Finland) Helsinki	15	4	2	1	7	II.
1956	(Australia) Melbourne	14	0	1	1	2	VI.
1960	(Italy) Rome	18	0	0	0	0	-
1964	(Japan) Tokyo	19	0	0	0	0	-
1968	Mexico City	14	0	0	0	0	-
1972	(West Germany) Munich	16	0	1	2	3	IX.
1976	(Canada) Montreal	8	0	0	0	0	-
1980	(Soviet Union) Moscow	13	1	2	1	4	VI.
1988	(South Korea) Seoul	13	4	2	0	6	III.
1992	(Spain) Barcelona	13	5	3	1	8	III.
1996	(United States) Atlanta	21	3	1	2	6	III.
2000	(Australia) Sydney	18	1	0	0	1	VIII.
2004	(Greece) Athens	25	0	1	1	2	XIV.
2008	(China) Beijing	28	0	3	0	3	XV.
2012	(United Kingdom) London	32	2	0	1	3	VI.
2016	(Brazil) Rio de Janeiro	35	3	2	2	7	III.
2020	(Japan) Tokyo	33	1	2	0	3	VIII.
2024	(France) Paris	23	3	1	1	5	V.
Total			32	28	21	81	IV.

=== World Championships ===
- including Hungarian national water polo teams results

Year	Host city	Gold	Silver	Bronze	Total	
1973	(Socialist Federal Republic of Yugoslavia) Belgrade	2	1	1	4	IV.
1975	(Colombia) Cali	3	1	0	4	III.
1978	(West Germany) West Berlin	0	1	2	3	IX.
1982	(Ecuador) Guayaquil	0	2	0	2	VIII.
1986	(Spain) Madrid	3	0	0	3	V.
1991	(Australia) Perth	5	2	2	9	III.
1994	(Italy) Rome	3	3	4	10	V.
1998	(Australia) Perth	1	1	2	4	X.
2001	(Japan) Fukuoka	1	1	1	3	XIV.
2003	(Spain) Barcelona	1	4	1	6	XII.
2005	(Canada) Montreal	2	2	1	5	VIII.
2007	(Australia) Melbourne	0	1	1	2	XX.
2009	(Italy) Rome	2	1	3	6	IX.
2011	(China) Shanghai	1	0	4	5	XIV.
2013	(Spain) Barcelona	4	1	2	7	V.
2015	(Russia) Kazan	3	3	4	10	VIII.
2017	(Hungary) Budapest	2	4	2	8	VII.
2019	(South Korea) Gwangju	4	0	0	4	III.
2022	(Hungary) Budapest	2	0	0	2	VII.
2023	(Japan) Fukuoka	1	2	0	3	XII
2024	(Qatar) Doha	0	0	1	1	XXV
2025	Singapore	1	2	1	4	XIV
Total		41	32	32	105	VII.

=== European Championships ===
- including Hungarian national water polo teams results

Year	Host city	Gold	Silver	Bronze	Total	
1926	(Hungary) Budapest	2	2	0	4	III.
1927	(Italy) Bologna	1	2	1	4	V.
1931	(France) Paris	5	2	2	9	I.
1934	(Germany) Magdeburg	3	0	0	3	III.
1938	(United Kingdom) London	1	0	3	4	VI.
1947	(Monaco) Monte Carlo	1	5	4	10	III.
1954	(Italy) Turin	9	6	3	18	I.
1958	(Hungary) Budapest	2	2	3	7	IV.
1962	(East Germany) Leipzig	2	0	2	4	VI.
1966	(Netherlands) Utrecht	0	1	1	2	VIII.
1970	(Spain) Barcelona	2	3	0	5	V.
1974	(Austria) Vienna	3	1	4	8	IV.
1977	(Sweden) Jönköping	3	1	1	5	IV.
1981	(Socialist Federal Republic of Yugoslavia) Split	2	0	1	3	V.
Total		106	91	69	266	IV.

== Presidents ==
- vacant (1907)
- Dr. János Virava (1908–1909)
- Alfréd Brüll (1909)
- Dr. János Virava (2x) (1910–1918)
- Alfréd Edvin Rőser (1919–1924)
- Géza Dormándy (1925–1926)
- Dr. Tivadar Homonnay (1926–1933)
- ifj. Miklós Horthy (1933–1944)
- Ferenc Csont (1945–1950)
- Viktor Kunsági (1951–1953)
- Zoltán Taródi (1954–1956)
- Ödön Boros (1957)
- István Sásdi (1957–1963)
- László Ligeti (1972–1977)
- Dr. Tamás Nagy (1978)
- vacant (1979–1980)
- Géza Sztanó (1981–1987)
- Dr. Lajos Dénes (1987–1989)
- Dr. András Hargitay (commissioned) (1990)
- László Kiss (commissioned) (1991)
- György Zemplényi (1992)
- Tamás Széchy (1992)
- Tamás Gyárfás (1993–2017)
- Gusztáv Bienerth (2017)
- Sándor Wladár (2017–present)

== National records ==
MÚSZ maintains the Hungarian records in swimming.
