= Sabine Götschy =

French canoeist

Personal information
- Full name: Sabine Götschy-Kleinheinz
- Nationality: French
- Born: 8 June 1962 (age 64) Eltville, Germany

Sport
- Sport: Canoeing
- Events: Canoe sprint; Wildwater canoeing
Medal record
Women's canoe sprint
Representing France
World Championships
Bronze medal – third place	1991 Paris	K-2 5000 m

Sabine Götschy (married name Kleinhenz, born 8 June 1962) is a German-born French former canoeist who won at senior level the Wildwater Canoeing World Championships.

== Biography ==
She competed in the early to mid-1990s. She won a bronze medal in the K-2 5000 m event at the 1991 ICF Canoe Sprint World Championships in Paris. Götschy-Kleinheinz also competed in two Summer Olympics, earning her best finish of sixth in the K-1 500 m event at Barcelona in 1992.
