= Kinga Czigány =

Hungarian canoeist (born 1972)

Personal information
- Nationality: Hungarian
- Born: 17 February 1972 (aged 53) Győr, Hungary
- Height: 173 cm (5 ft 8 in)
- Weight: 64 kg (141 lb)

Sport
- Sport: Sprint canoe

Kinga Czigány
Medal record

Women's canoe sprint

Olympic Games
Gold medal – first place	1992 Barcelona	K-4 500 m

World Championships
Silver medal – second place	1993 Copenhagen	K-2 500 m
Silver medal – second place	1994 Mexico City	K-2 500 m
Silver medal – second place	1994 Mexico City	K-4 500 m
Bronze medal – third place	1993 Copenhagen	K-4 500 m
Bronze medal – third place	1995 Duisburg	K-4 500 m

Kinga Czigány (born 17 February 1972) is a Hungarian sprint canoer who competed at both the Olympic Games and the World Championships in the 1990s. Competing in two Summer Olympics, she won gold in the K-4 500 m event at Barcelona in 1992.

Czigány also won five medals at the ICF Canoe Sprint World Championships with three silvers (K-2 500 m: 1993, 1994; K-4 500 m: 1994) and two bronzes (K-4 500 m: 1993, 1995).

== Awards ==
- Order of Merit of the Republic of Hungary – Small Cross (1992)
- Hungarian Kayaker of the Year (2): 1992, 1993
- 1992 member of the Hungarian Team of the Year (along with Rita Kőbán, Erika Mészáros, and Éva Dónusz)
