= Erika Mészáros =

Hungarian sprint canoeist

Medal record

Women's canoe sprint

Representing Hungary

Olympic Games
Gold medal – first place	1992 Barcelona	K-4 500 m
Silver medal – second place	1988 Seoul	K-4 500 m

World Championships
Gold medal – first place	1986 Montreal	K-2 500 m
Gold medal – first place	1986 Montreal	K-4 500 m
Silver medal – second place	1989 Plovdiv	K-2 500 m
Silver medal – second place	1989 Plovdiv	K-4 500 m
Silver medal – second place	1990 Poznań	K-2 500 m
Silver medal – second place	1990 Poznań	K-2 5000 m
Silver medal – second place	1990 Poznań	K-4 500 m
Silver medal – second place	1991 Paris	K-2 500 m
Silver medal – second place	1991 Paris	K-4 500 m
Silver medal – second place	1993 Copenhagen	K-2 5000 m
Bronze medal – third place	1993 Copenhagen	K-4 500 m

Erika Mészáros (born 24 June 1966 in Budapest) is a Hungarian sprint canoer who competed from the mid-1980s to the mid-1990s. Competing in three Summer Olympics, she won two medals in the K-4 500 m event with a gold in 1992 and a silver in 1988.

Mészáros also won eleven medals at the ICF Canoe Sprint World Championships with two golds (K-2 500 m and K-4 500 m: both 1986), eight silvers (K-2 500 m: 1989, 1990, 1991; K-2 5000 m: 1990, 1993; K-4 500 m: 1989, 1990, 1991), and a bronze (K-4 500 m: 1993).

Her father, György, won two Olympic canoeing silver medals at the 1960 Summer Olympics in Rome, earning them in the K-1 4 x 500 m relay and K-2 1000 m events.

== Awards ==
- Hungarian kayaker of the Year (4): 1986, 1989, 1990, 1992
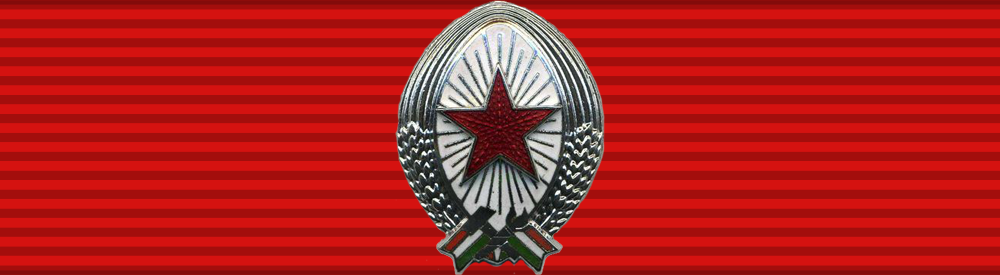
- Work Order of Merit of Hungarian People's Republic – Silver Cross (1988)
- Order of Merit of the Republic of Hungary – Small Cross (1992)
- Member of the Hungarian team of year (with Rita Kőbán, Éva Dónusz, Kinga Czigány): 1992
