= László Kiss (swimmer) =

Hungarian swimmer and coach

Personal information
- Nationality: Hungarian
- Born: 14 December 1940 (age 85) Budapest, Hungary

Sport
- Sport: Swimming

László Kiss (born 14 December 1940) is a Hungarian former swimmer. He competed in two events at the 1960 Summer Olympics.
