= Canoeing at the 1996 Summer Olympics – Men's C-2 500 metres =

Men's C-2 500 metres at the Games of the XXVI Olympiad
- Venue: Lake Lanier
- Dates: 31 July 1996 (heats); 2 August 1996 (semifinals); 4 August 1996 (final)
- Competitors: 19 boats from 19 nations
- Winning time: 1:40.420

Medalists
1st place, gold medalist(s)		Csaba Horváth; György Kolonics	Hungary
2nd place, silver medalist(s)		Nicolae Juravschi; Victor Reneischi	Moldova
3rd place, bronze medalist(s)		Gheorghe Andriev; Grigore Obreja	Romania

The men's C-2 500 metres event was an open-style, pairs canoeing event conducted as part of the Canoeing at the 1996 Summer Olympics program.

== Medalists ==
Gold	Silver	Bronze
György Kolonics and Csaba Horváth (HUN)	Viktor Reneysky and Nicolae Juravschi (MDA)	Gheorghe Andriev and Grigore Obreja (ROU)

== Results ==
=== Heats ===
19 teams entered in three heats. The top three finishers from each of the heats advanced to the semifinals while the remaining teams were relegated to the repechages.

Heat 1
1.	György Kolonics and Csaba Horváth (HUN)	1:43.907	QS
2.	José Alfredo Bea and Oleg Shelestenko (ESP)	1:45.635	QS
3.	Andrey Kabanov and Pavel Konovalov (RUS)	1:46.307	QS
4.	Dražen Funtak and Ivan Šabjan (CRO)	1:47.235	QR
5.	Attila Buday and Tamas Buday, Jr. (CAN)	1:47.551	QR
6.	Dmitri Dovgalenok and Aleksandr Maseikov (BLR)	1:47.923	QR
7.	Pavel Bednář and Petr Fuksa (CZE)	1:47.955	QR
Heat 2
1.	Viktor Reneysky and Nicolae Juravschi (MDA)	1:44.477	QS
2.	Andreas Dittmer and Gunar Kirchbach (GER)	1:45.145	QS
3.	Martin Marinov and Blagovest Stoyanov (BUL)	1:45.545	QS
4.	Csaba Orosz and Peter Páleš (SVK)	1:45.893	QR
5.	Park Chang-Gyu and Jeon Gwang-Rak (KOR)	1:47.453	QR
6.	Paweł Baraszkiewicz and Marcin Kobierski (POL)	1:48.357	QR
7.	Vladimir Shayslamov and Sergey Shayslamov (UZB)	1:51.929	QR
Heat 3
1.	Gheorghe Andriev and Grigore Obreja (ROU)	1:43.548	QS
2.	Oleksandr Lytvynenko and Oleksiy Ihraiev (UKR)	1:46.652	QS
3.	Domenico Cannone and Antonio Marmorino (ITA)	1:46.996	QS
4.	Andrew Train and Stephen Train (GBR)	1:47.892	QR
5.	Sergei Sergeyev and Kaysar Nurmaganbetov (KAZ)	1:49.252	QR

=== Repechages ===
Two repechages were held. The top four finishers from each repechage and the fastest fifth-place finisher advanced to the semifinals.

Repechage 1
1.	Attila Buday and Tamas Buday, Jr. (CAN)	1:49.820	QS
2.	Andrew Train and Stephen Train (GBR)	1:50.476	QS
3.	Pavel Bednář and Petr Fuksa (CZE)	1:50.480	QS
4.	Park Chang-Gyu and Jeon Gwang-Rak (KOR)	1:50.776	QS
5.	Vladimir Shayslamov and Sergey Shayslamov (UZB)	1:52.768
Repechage 2
1.	Dmitri Dovgalenok and Aleksandr Maseikov (BLR)	1:47.837	QS
2.	Csaba Orosz and Peter Páleš (SVK)	1:47.965	QS
3.	Paweł Baraszkiewicz and Marcin Kobierski (POL)	1:48.093	QS
4.	Dražen Funtak and Ivan Šabjan (CRO)	1:50.473	QS
5.	Sergei Sergeyev and Kaysar Nurmaganbetov (KAZ)	1:51.533	QS

=== Semifinals ===
Two semifinals were held. The top four finishers from each semifinal and the fastest fifth-place finisher advanced to the final.

Semifinal 1
1.	Gheorghe Andriev and Grigore Obreja (ROU)	1:41.653	QF
2.	Viktor Reneysky and Nicolae Juravschi (MDA)	1:42.029	QF
3.	José Alfredo Bea and Oleg Shelestenko (ESP)	1:42.397	QF
4.	Andrey Kabanov and Pavel Konovalov (RUS)	1:43.141	QF
5.	Csaba Orosz and Peter Páleš (SVK)	1:43.757	QF
6.	Attila Buday and Tamas Buday, Jr. (CAN)	1:44.213
7.	Park Chang-Gyu and Jeon Gwang-Rak (KOR)	1:44.453
8.	Paweł Baraszkiewicz and Marcin Kobierski (POL)	1:44.793
9.	Domenico Cannone and Antonio Marmorino (ITA)	1:47.557
Semifinal 2
1.	György Kolonics and Csaba Horváth (HUN)	1:42.186	QF
2.	Andreas Dittmer and Gunar Kirchbach (GER)	1:43.650	QF
3.	Dmitri Dovgalenok and Aleksandr Maseikov (BLR)	1:43.938	QF
4.	Martin Marinov and Blagovest Stoyanov (BUL)	1:44.130	QF
5.	Dražen Funtak and Ivan Šabjan (CRO)	1:44.770
6.	Pavel Bednář and Petr Fuksa (CZE)	1:44.902
7.	Andrew Train and Stephen Train (GBR)	1:45.638
8.	Sergei Sergeyev and Kaysar Nurmaganbetov (KAZ)	1:45.998
9.	Oleksandr Lytvynenko and Oleksiy Ihraiev (UKR)	1:51.010

=== Final ===
The final was held on August 4.

Gold	György Kolonics and Csaba Horváth (HUN)	1:40.420
Silver	Viktor Reneysky and Nicolae Juravschi (MDA)	1:40.456
Bronze	Gheorghe Andriev and Grigore Obreja (ROU)	1:41.336
4.	Andreas Dittmer and Gunar Kirchbach (GER)	1:41.760
5.	Martin Marinov and Blagovest Stoyanov (BUL)	1:42.208
6.	Andrey Kabanov and Pavel Konovalov (RUS)	1:42.496
7.	José Alfredo Bea and Oleg Shelestenko (ESP)	1:43.572
8.	Csaba Orosz and Peter Páleš (SVK)	1:44.116
9.	Dmitri Dovgalenok and Aleksandr Maseikov (BLR)	1:46.840

Juravschi, in his third Summer Olympics with his third different country, convinced his old partner Reneysky, who he won gold with in this event at the 1988 Summer Olympics, in 1994 to compete with him. The pair lost to the gold-medal winning Hungarians in a photo-finish by less than two centimeters (0.75 inches). Prior to that Reneysky was a coach for Belarus
