= Canoeing at the 1996 Summer Olympics – Men's C-1 500 metres =

Men's C-1 500 metres at the Games of the XXVI Olympiad
- Venue: Lake Lanier
- Dates: 31 July 1996 (heats); 2 August 1996 (semifinals); 4 August 1996 (final)
- Competitors: 17 from 17 nations
- Winning time: 1:49.934

Medalists
1st place, gold medalist(s)		Martin Doktor	Czech Republic
2nd place, silver medalist(s)		Slavomír Kňazovický	Slovakia
3rd place, bronze medalist(s)		Imre Pulai	Hungary

The men's C-1 500 metres event was an open-style, individual canoeing event conducted as part of the Canoeing at the 1996 Summer Olympics program.

== Medallists ==
Gold	Silver	Bronze
Martin Doktor (CZE)	Slavomír Kňazovický (SVK)	Imre Pulai (HUN)

== Results ==
=== Heats ===
17 competitors were entered. The top two finishers in each heat moved on to the final with the others were relegated to the semifinals.

Heat 1
1.	Martin Doktor (CZE)	1:52.907	QF
2.	Slavomír Kňazovický (SVK)	1:52.971	QF
3.	Steve Giles (CAN)	1:53.803	QS
4.	Michał Śliwiński (UKR)	1:54.283	QS
5.	Nikolay Bukhalov (BUL)	1:54.727	QS
6.	Konstantin Negodyayev (KAZ)	1:55.859	QS
7.	Jim Terrell (USA)	1:57.295	QS
8.	José Manuel Crespo (ESP)	1:57.915	QS
9.	Andrei Placinta (MDA)	1:59.423	QS
Heat 2
1.	Thomas Zereske (GER)	1:53.840	QF
2.	Imre Pulai (HUN)	1:54.244	QF
3.	Éric le Leuch (FRA)	1:54.544	QS
4.	Christian Frederiksen (DEN)	1:55.056	QS
5.	Florin Huidu (ROU)	1:58.140	QS
6.	Dražen Funtak (CRO)	2:00.076	QS
7.	Silvestre Pereira (POR)	2:01.576	QS
8.	Yevgeny Astanin (UZB)	2:02.532	QS

=== Semifinals ===
Two semifinals were held with the top two finishers of each semifinal and the fastest third-place finisher advancing to the final.

Semifinal 1
1.	Michał Śliwiński (UKR)	1:52.093	QF
2.	Konstantin Negodyayev (KAZ)	1:52.423	QF
3.	Éric le Leuch (FRA)	1:53.305
4.	José Manuel Crespo (ESP)	1:54.121
5.	Florin Huidu (ROU)	1:56.733
6.	Andrei Placinta (MDA)	1:57.457
7.	Silvestre Pereira (POR)	1:57.949
Semifinal 2
1.	Steve Giles (CAN)	1:51.614	QF
2.	Nikolay Bukhalov (BUL)	1:51.914	QF
3.	Christian Frederiksen (DEN)	1:52.174	QF
4.	Jim Terrell (USA)	1:54.086
5.	Dražen Funtak (CRO)	1:58.570
6.	Yevgeny Astanin (UZB)	1:59.042

=== Final ===
The final took place on August 4.

Gold	Martin Doktor (CZE)	1:49.934
Silver	Slavomír Kňazovický (SVK)	1:50.510
Bronze	Imre Pulai (HUN)	1:50.758
4.	Michał Śliwiński (UKR)	1:51.714
5.	Thomas Zereske (GER)	1:52.358
6.	Christian Frederiksen (DEN)	1:52.846
7.	Konstantin Negodyayev (KAZ)	1:53.158
8.	Steve Giles (CAN)	1:53.326
-	Nikolay Bukhalov (BUL)	DISQ

Doktor won his second gold medal by making his move at the 350 meter mark. Defending Olympic champion Bukhalov's disqualification was not disclosed in the official report.
