= Canoeing at the 1998 Asian Games – Men's C-2 1000 metres =

Men's C-2 1000 metres at the 1998 Asian Games
- Venue: Map Prachan Reservoir
- Date: 8–9 December 1998
- Competitors: 24 from 12 nations

Medalists
gold medal	Konstantin Negodyayev; Sergey Sergeyev	Kazakhstan
silver medal	Qiu Suoren; Sun Maosheng	China
bronze medal	Fumiaki Okawa; Masanobu Ozono	Japan

The men's C-2 1000 metres sprint canoeing competition at the 1998 Asian Games in Thailand was held on 8 and 9 December at Map Prachan Reservoir.

== Schedule ==
All times are Indochina Time (UTC+07:00)

Date	Time	Event
Tuesday, 8 December 1998	08:30	Heats
Tuesday, 8 December 1998	15:00	Semifinal
Wednesday, 9 December 1998	08:30	Final

== Results ==
Legend

- DNS — Did not start
- DSQ — Disqualified

=== Heats ===
- Qualification: 1–2 → Final (QF), 3–5 → Semifinal (QS)

==== Heat 1 ====
Rank	Team	Time	Notes
1	China (CHN); Qiu Suoren; Sun Maosheng	4:10.94	QF
2	Uzbekistan (UZB); Sergey Shayslamov; Vladimir Shayslamov	4:11.57	QF
3	Japan (JPN); Fumiaki Okawa; Masanobu Ozono	4:19.38	QS
4	Myanmar (MYA); Aung Lin; Saw Bar Htoo	4:44.16	QS
5	Iran (IRI); Elias Eghlimi; Mahmoud Reza Zarinderakht	4:46.25	QS
—	Tajikistan (TJK); M. Sharipov; Safa Tatimov	DNS	

==== Heat 2 ====
Rank	Team	Time	Notes
1	Kazakhstan (KAZ); Konstantin Negodyayev; Sergey Sergeyev	4:13.13	QF
2	North Korea (PRK); Jon Song-jin; Kim Ji-yun	4:24.26	QF
3	South Korea (KOR); Jun Kwang-rak; Park Chang-kyu	4:24.45	QS
4	India (IND); Siji Kumar Sadanandan; Subhash Sivankutty	4:32.89	QS
5	Thailand (THA); Ongart Ploenchoen; Lapin Kunna	4:58.15	QS
—	Laos (LAO); S. Fongvichith; S. Sisoutham	DNS	

=== Semifinal ===
- Qualification: 1–2 → Final (QF)

Rank	Team	Time	Notes
1	South Korea (KOR); Jun Kwang-rak; Park Chang-kyu	3:48.61	QF
2	Japan (JPN); Fumiaki Okawa; Masanobu Ozono	3:48.63	QF
3	India (IND); Siji Kumar Sadanandan; Subhash Sivankutty	4:11.09	
4	Iran (IRI); Elias Eghlimi; Mahmoud Reza Zarinderakht	4:14.05	
5	Myanmar (MYA); Aung Lin; Saw Bar Htoo	4:22.99	
6	Thailand (THA); Ongart Ploenchoen; Lapin Kunna	4:29.50	

=== Final ===
Rank	Team	Time
1st place, gold medalist(s)	Kazakhstan (KAZ); Konstantin Negodyayev; Sergey Sergeyev	4:10.35
2nd place, silver medalist(s)	China (CHN); Qiu Suoren; Sun Maosheng	4:21.29
3rd place, bronze medalist(s)	Japan (JPN); Fumiaki Okawa; Masanobu Ozono	4:25.58
4	North Korea (PRK); Jon Song-jin; Kim Ji-yun	4:29.91
5	South Korea (KOR); Jun Kwang-rak; Park Chang-kyu	4:37.62
—	Uzbekistan (UZB); Sergey Shayslamov; Vladimir Shayslamov	DSQ
