= Canoeing at the 1992 Summer Olympics – Men's C-1 500 metres =

The men's C-1 500 metres event was an open-style, individual canoeing event conducted as part of the Canoeing at the 1992 Summer Olympics program.

== Medallists ==
Gold	Silver	Bronze
Nikolay Bukhalov (BUL)	Michał Śliwiński (EUN)	Olaf Heukrodt (GER)

== Results ==
=== Heats ===
19 competitors were entered. The top three finishers in each heat moved on to the semifinals with the others were relegated to the repechages.

Heat 1
1.	Michał Śliwiński (EUN)	1:51.82	QS
2.	Olaf Heukrodt (GER)	1:53.91	QS
3.	Slavomír Kňazovický (TCH)	1:54.37	QS
4.	Pascal Sylvoz (FRA)	1:54.60	QR
5.	Park Chang-Gyu (KOR)	1:56.05	QR
6.	Franco Lizzio (ITA)	1:57.62	QR
7.	Aleksandar Đurić (BIH)	2:07.12	QR
Heat 2
1.	Nikolay Bukhalov (BUL)	1:53.64	QS
2.	Imre Pulai (HUN)	1:54.68	QS
3.	Victor Partnoi (ROU)	1:56.40	QS
4.	Fred Spaulding (USA)	1:56.86	QR
5.	Mariusz Walkowiak (POL)	1:58.14	QR
6.	Armando Silega (CUB)	1:58.78	QR
Heat 3
1.	Steve Giles (CAN)	1:53.50	QS
2.	Eric Jamieson (GBR)	1:54.80	QS
3.	Efims Klementjevs (LAT)	1:56.53	QS
4.	Tiit Tikerpe (EST)	1:57.95	QR
5.	Francisco López (ESP)	1:58.84	QR
6.	Peter Liljedahl (SWE)	1:59.07	QR

=== Repechages ===
Two repechages were held with the top four finishers in each repechage and the fastest fifth-place finisher advancing to the semifinals.

Repechage 1
1.	Pascal Sylvoz (FRA)	1:55.72	QS
2.	Tiit Tikerpe (EST)	1:56.24	QS
3.	Armando Silega (CUB)	1:56.25	QS
4.	Mariusz Walkowiak (POL)	1:58.24	QS
5.	Aleksandar Đurić (BIH)	2:04.68
Repechage 2
1.	Franco Lizzio (ITA)	1:54.72	QS
2.	Park Chang-Gyu (KOR)	1:55.16	QS
3.	Peter Liljedahl (SWE)	1:55.29	QS
4.	Francisco López (ESP)	1:56.60	QS
5.	Fred Spaulding (USA)	1:57.48	QS

=== Semifinals ===
Two semifinals were held with the top four finishers of each semifinal and the fastest fifth-place finisher advancing to the final.

Semifinal 1
1.	Nikolay Bukhalov (BUL)	1:53.32	QF
2.	Olaf Heukrodt (GER)	1:53.74	QF
3.	Slavomír Kňazovický (TCH)	1:54.04	QF
4.	Pascal Sylvoz (FRA)	1:54.38	QF
5.	Steve Giles (CAN)	1:54.94	QF
6.	Efims Klementjevs (LAT)	1:56.96
7.	Peter Liljedahl (SWE)	1:58.26
8.	Park Chang-Gyu (KOR)	1:58.61
9.	Mariusz Walkowiak (POL)	2:00.28
Semifinal 2
1.	Michał Śliwiński (EUN)	1:52.28	QF
2.	Imre Pulai (HUN)	1:54.64	QF
3.	Eric Jamieson (GBR)	1:55.90	QF
4.	Victor Partnoi (ROU)	1:56.00	QF
5.	Franco Lizzio (ITA)	1:56.02
6.	Fred Spaulding (USA)	1:57.48
7.	Francisco López (ESP)	1:57.51
8.	Armando Silega (CUB)	1:59.22
9.	Tiit Tikerpe (EST)	2:06.24

=== Final ===
The final took place on August 7.

Gold	Nikolay Bukhalov (BUL)	1:51.15
Silver	Michał Śliwiński (EUN)	1:51.40
Bronze	Olaf Heukrodt (GER)	1:53.00
4.	Slavomír Kňazovický (TCH)	1:54.51
5.	Imre Pulai (HUN)	1:54.86
6.	Steve Giles (CAN)	1:55.80
7.	Pascal Sylvoz (FRA)	1:55.96
8.	Victor Partnoi (ROU)	1:57.34
DISQ	Eric Jamieson (GBR)	1:56.61

Three-time event world champion Slyvynsky was upset by Bukhalov, who also beat him on the Olympic course at 1991. Jamieson originally finished eighth, but was disqualified for reasons not disclosed in the official report.
