= Canoeing at the 2000 Summer Olympics – Men's C-1 500 metres =

The men's C-1 500 metres event was an open-style, individual canoeing event conducted as part of the Canoeing at the 2000 Summer Olympics program.

== Medallists ==
Gold	Silver	Bronze
György Kolonics (HUN)	Maxim Opalev (RUS)	Andreas Dittmer (GER)

== Results ==
=== Heats ===
18 competitors were entered on 27 September. The top three finishers in both heats moved on to the final. Fourth through seventh-place finishers and the fastest eighth-place finisher advanced to the semifinal.

==== Heat 1 ====
Rank	Canoer	Country	Time	Notes
1	Maxim Opalev	Russia	1:51.048	QF
2	György Kolonics	Hungary	1:51.492	QF
3	Slavomír Kňazovický	Slovakia	1:52.146	QF
4	Florin Huidu	Romania	1:53.076	QS
5	José Manuel Crespo	Spain	1:53.862	QS
6	Christian Frederiksen	Norway	1:54.366	QS
7	Aleksandr Maseykov	Belarus	1:54.468	SQ
8	Kaysar Nurmaganbetov	Kazakhstan	1:55.422	SQ
9	Jordan Malloch	United States	1:58.938	

==== Heat 2 ====
Rank	Canoer	Country	Time	Notes
1	Andreas Dittmer	Germany	1:50.340	QF
2	Martin Doktor	Czech Republic	1:51.174	QF
3	Ledis Balceiro	Cuba	1:51.918	QF
4	Nikolay Bukhalov	Bulgaria	1:51.996	QS
5	Maxime Boilard	Canada	1:52.764	QS
6	Michał Śliwiński	Ukraine	1:53.682	QS
7	Éric le Leuch	France	1:53.934	SQ
8	Andreas Kilingaridis	Greece	1:57.858	
9	Michał Gajownik	Poland	2:04.704	

=== Semifinal ===
A semifinal was held on 29 September with the top three finishers advancing to the final.

Rank	Canoer	Country	Time	Notes
1	Maxime Boilard	Canada	1:52.071	QF
2	Nikolay Bukhalov	Bulgaria	1:52.371	QF
3	Michał Śliwiński	Ukraine	1:52.461	QF
4	Florin Huidu	Romania	1:53.277	
5	Christian Frederiksen	Norway	1:53.661	
6	Kaysar Nurmaganbetov	Kazakhstan	1:54.465	
7	José Manuel Crespo	Spain	1:54.765	
8	Aleksandr Maseykov	Belarus	1:55.035	
9	Éric le Leuch	France	1:56.907	

=== Final ===
The final took place on 1 October.

Rank	Canoer	Country	Time	Notes
1st place, gold medalist(s)	György Kolonics	Hungary	2:24.813	
2nd place, silver medalist(s)	Maxim Opalev	Russia	2:25.809	
3rd place, bronze medalist(s)	Andreas Dittmer	Germany	2:27.591	
4	Maxime Boilard	Canada	2:29.259	
5	Slavomír Kňazovický	Slovakia	2:29.613	
6	Ledis Balceiro	Cuba	2:32.229	
7	Michał Śliwiński	Ukraine	2:33.129	
8	Martin Doktor	Czech Republic	2:37.467	
9	Nikolay Bukhalov	Bulgaria	2:44.829	

Kolonics, initially a C-2 canoer, moved to C-1 500 m when he and his partner Csaba Horváth failed to qualify in the Hungarian Olympic trials. His prior success in this event was a silver at the 1993 world championships, but he was able to upset then two-time defending event world champion Opalev (The Russian has won this event world championship five times as of 2008.) in the final. Before his 2008 death, Kolonics would win two more world championship silvers in the event, earning them in 2001 and 2002.
