= Canoeing at the 2000 Summer Olympics – Men's C-1 1000 metres =

The men's C-1 1000 metres event was an open-style, individual canoeing event conducted as part of the Canoeing at the 2000 Summer Olympics program.

== Medallists ==
Gold	Silver	Bronze
Andreas Dittmer (GER)	Ledis Balceiro (CUB)	Stephen Giles (CAN)

== Results ==
=== Heats ===
18 competitors were entered on 26 September. The top three finishers in each heat moved on to the final. Fourth through seventh-place finishers from each heat and the fastest eighth-place finisher advanced to the semifinal

==== Heat 1 ====
Rank	Canoer	Country	Time	Notes
1	Ledis Balceiro	Cuba	3:55.120	QF
2	Stephen Giles	Canada	3:55.396	QF
3	Peter Páleš	Slovakia	3:58.036	QF
4	Efims Klementjevs	Latvia	3:58.840	QS
5	Nikolay Bukhalov	Bulgaria	3:59.092	QS
6	Maxim Opalev	Russia	4:00.568	QS
7	György Zala	Hungary	4:00.754	QS
8	Kaysar Nurmaganbetov	Kazakhstan	4:01.438	QS
9	Nikica Ljubek	Croatia	4:10.954	

==== Heat 2 ====
Rank	Canoer	Country	Time	Notes
1	Andreas Dittmer	Germany	3:53.962	QF
2	Martin Doktor	Czech Republic	3:55.216	QF
3	Christian Frederiksen	Norway	3:55.378	QF
4	Éric le Leuch	France	3:55.726	QS
5	Florin Huidu	Romania	3:56.770	QS
6	Andreas Kilingaridis	Greece	4:01.042	QS
7	José Manuel Crespo	Spain	4:04.628	QS
8	Jordan Malloch	United States	4:05.440	
9	Daniel Jędraszko	Poland	4:25.726	

=== Semifinal ===
The top three finishers in the semifinal advanced to the final.

==== Semifinal ====
Rank	Canoer	Country	Time	Notes
1	Maxim Opalev	Russia	4:01.222	QF
2	Efims Klementjevs	Latvia	4:01.300	QF
3	Éric le Leuch	France	4:02.038	QF
4	György Zala	Hungary	4:03.226	
5	Florin Huidu	Romania	4:03.910	
6	José Manuel Crespo	Spain	4:04.042	
7	Kaysar Nurmagambetov	Kazakhstan	4:05.206	
8	Nikolay Bukhalov	Bulgaria	4:05.236	
	Andreas Kilingaridis	Greece	DISQ	

Kilingaridis's disqualification was not disclosed in the official report.

=== Final ===
Rank	Canoer	Country	Time	Notes
1st place, gold medalist(s)	Andreas Dittmer	Germany	3:54.379	
2nd place, silver medalist(s)	Ledis Balceiro	Cuba	3:56.071	
3rd place, bronze medalist(s)	Stephen Giles	Canada	3:56.437	
4	Éric le Leuch	France	3:57.217	
5	Christian Frederiksen	Norway	3:58.159	
6	Maxim Opalev	Russia	3:58.813	
7	Efims Klementjevs	Latvia	4:00.931	
8	Martin Doktor	Czech Republic	4:02.335	
9	Peter Páleš	Slovakia	4:03.091	
