= Canoeing at the 1998 Asian Games – Men's C-2 500 metres =

Men's C-2 500 metres at the 1998 Asian Games
- Venue: Map Prachan Reservoir
- Date: 10–11 December 1998
- Competitors: 24 from 12 nations

Medalists
gold medal	Konstantin Negodyayev; Sergey Sergeyev	Kazakhstan
silver medal	Jun Kwang-rak; Park Chang-kyu	South Korea
bronze medal	Meng Guanliang; Sun Maosheng	China

The men's C-2 500 metres sprint canoeing competition at the 1998 Asian Games in Thailand was held on 10 and 11 December at Map Prachan Reservoir.

== Schedule ==
All times are Indochina Time (UTC+07:00)

Date	Time	Event
Thursday, 10 December 1998	08:30	Heats
Thursday, 10 December 1998	15:00	Semifinal
Friday, 11 December 1998	08:30	Final

== Results ==
Legend

- DNF — Did not finish
- DNS — Did not start
- DSQ — Disqualified

=== Heats ===
- Qualification: 1–2 → Final (QF), 3–5 → Semifinal (QS)

==== Heat 1 ====
Rank	Team	Time	Notes
1	South Korea (KOR); Jun Kwang-rak; Park Chang-kyu	1:44.62	QF
2	Kazakhstan (KAZ); Konstantin Negodyayev; Sergey Sergeyev	1:44.82	QF
3	China (CHN); Meng Guanliang; Sun Maosheng	1:50.09	QS
4	Japan (JPN); Fumiaki Okawa; Masanobu Ozono	1:58.79	QS
5	Myanmar (MYA); Aung Lin; Saw Bar Htoo	2:01.59	QS
6	Thailand (THA); Korakot Metta; V. Sirishantranone	2:07.07	

==== Heat 2 ====
Rank	Team	Time	Notes
1	Uzbekistan (UZB); Sergey Shayslamov; Vladimir Shayslamov	1:47.41	QF
2	North Korea (PRK); Kim Ji-yun; Jon Song-jin	1:50.51	QF
3	India (IND); Siji Kumar Sadanandan; Subhash Sivankutty	1:51.21	QS
4	Iran (IRI); Elias Eghlimi; Mahmoud Reza Zarinderakht	1:55.79	QS
5	Laos (LAO); S. Fongvichith; S. Sisoutham	2:35.76	QS
—	Tajikistan (TJK); M. Sharipov; Safa Tatimov	DNS	

=== Semifinal ===
- Qualification: 1–2 → Final (QF)

Rank	Team	Time	Notes
1	China (CHN); Meng Guanliang; Sun Maosheng	1:47.88	QF
2	Japan (JPN); Fumiaki Okawa; Masanobu Ozono	1:47.94	QF
3	India (IND); Siji Kumar Sadanandan; Subhash Sivankutty	1:51.98	
4	Iran (IRI); Elias Eghlimi; Mahmoud Reza Zarinderakht	1:55.75	
—	Laos (LAO); S. Fongvichith; S. Sisoutham	DNF	
—	Myanmar (MYA); Aung Lin; Saw Bar Htoo	DNF	

=== Final ===
Rank	Team	Time
1st place, gold medalist(s)	Kazakhstan (KAZ); Konstantin Negodyayev; Sergey Sergeyev	1:53.16
2nd place, silver medalist(s)	South Korea (KOR); Jun Kwang-rak; Park Chang-kyu	1:57.15
3rd place, bronze medalist(s)	China (CHN); Meng Guanliang; Sun Maosheng	2:06.19
4	Japan (JPN); Fumiaki Okawa; Masanobu Ozono	2:11.03
—	North Korea (PRK); Kim Ji-yun; Jon Song-jin	DSQ
—	Uzbekistan (UZB); Sergey Shayslamov; Vladimir Shayslamov	DSQ
