= Canoeing at the 2000 Summer Olympics – Men's C-2 500 metres =

The men's C-2 500 metres event was an open-style, pairs canoeing event conducted as part of the Canoeing at the 2000 Summer Olympics program.

== Medalists ==
Gold	Silver	Bronze
Ferenc Novák and Imre Pulai (HUN)	Daniel Jędraszko and Paweł Baraszkiewicz (POL)	Mitică Pricop and Florin Popescu (ROU)

== Results ==
=== Heats ===
Date: Wednesday 27 September 2000

15 teams entered in two heats. The top three finishers from each heat advanced to the finals while the remaining teams were relegated to the semifinal.

Rank	Canoer	Country	Time	Notes
1	Daniel Jędraszko and Paweł Baraszkiewicz	Poland	1:41.511	QF
2	Serhiy Klyniuk and Dmytro Sablin	Ukraine	1:42.903	QF
3	Christian Gille and Thomas Zereske	Germany	1:43.233	QF
4	Petr Procházka and Jan Břečka	Czech Republic	1:44.175	QS
5	José Alfredo Bea and David Mascató	Spain	1:44.973	QS
6	Nikica Ljubek and Dražen Funtak	Croatia	1:45.567	QS
7	José Ramón Ferrer and José Antonio Romero	Mexico	1:45.927	QS
8	Attila Buday and Tamás Buday, Jr.	Canada	1:46.557	QS

Rank	Canoer	Country	Time	Notes
1	Mitică Pricop and Florin Popescu	Romania	1:41.904	QF
2	Ibrahim Rojas and Leobaldo Pereira	Cuba	1:42.180	QF
3	Ferenc Novák and Imre Pulai	Hungary	1:42.816	QF
4	Zhomart Satubaldin and Konstantin Negodyayev	Kazakhstan	1:45.810	QS
5	Andrew Train and Stephen Train	Great Britain	1:46.986	QS
6	Aleksandr Kovalyov and Aleksandr Kostoglod	Russia	1:47.682	QS
7	Ján Kubica and Mário Ostrćil	Slovakia	1:47.934	QS

=== Semifinal ===
Date: Friday 29 September 2000

The top three finishers from the semifinal advanced to the final.

Rank	Canoer	Country	Time	Notes
1	Aleksandr Kovalyov and Aleksandr Kostoglod	Russia	1:44.981	QF
2	José Alfredo Bea and David Mascató	Spain	1:45.677	QF
3	Zhomart Satubaldin and Konstantin Negodyayev	Kazakhstan	1:45.809	QF
4	Petr Procházka and Jan Břečka	Czech Republic	1:46.013	
5	José Ramón Ferrer and José Antonio Romero	Mexico	1:46.811	
6	Nikica Ljubek and Dražen Funtak	Croatia	1:46.955	
7	Attila Buday and Tamás Buday, Jr.	Canada	1:47.525	
8	Ján Kubica and Mário Ostrćil	Slovakia	1:48.749	
9	Andrew Train and Stephen Train	Great Britain	1:49.931	

=== Final ===
Date: Sunday 1 October 2000

Rank	Canoer	Country	Time	Notes
1st place, gold medalist(s)	Ferenc Novák and Imre Pulai	Hungary	1:51.284	
2nd place, silver medalist(s)	Daniel Jędraszko and Paweł Baraszkiewicz	Poland	1:51.536	
3rd place, bronze medalist(s)	Mitică Pricop and Florin Popescu	Romania	1:54.260	
4	José Alfredo Bea and David Mascató	Spain	1:56.600	
5	Christian Gille and Thomas Zereske	Germany	1:59.294	
6	Aleksandr Kovalyov and Aleksandr Kostoglod	Russia	2:00.134	
7	Zhomart Satubaldin and Konstantin Negodyayev	Kazakhstan	2:01.436	
8	Serhiy Klyniuk and Dmytro Sablin	Ukraine	2:02.612	
9	Ibrahim Rojas and Leobaldo Pereira	Cuba	2:17.126	

Pulai and Novák were known as "The Monster and the Little Guy" because Pulai was 1.99 meters (6 ft. 6.25 in.) tall and weighed 97 kg (214 lbs) while Novák was 1.72 meters (5 ft. 8 in.) and weighed 77 kg (170 lbs). Pulai taped Novák's leg to the boat so that his partner would not fall to the strong winds blowing on the day of the final.
