= Canoeing at the 1992 Summer Olympics – Men's C-1 1000 metres =

The men's C-1 1000 metres event was an open-style, individual canoeing event conducted as part of the Canoeing at the 1992 Summer Olympics program.

== Medallists ==
| Gold | Silver | Bronze |
| Nikolay Bukhalov (BUL) | Ivans Klementyev (LAT) | György Zala (HUN) |

== Results ==
=== Heats ===
19 competitors were entered. The top three finishers in each heat moved on to the semifinals with the others relegated to the repechages.

==== Heat 1 ====
| Rank | Canoer | Country | Time | Notes |
|---|---|---|---|---|
| 1. | Matthias Röder | Germany | 4:02.57 | QS |
| 2. | Pascal Sylvoz | France | 4:03.39 | QS |
| 3. | Ivans Klementyev | Latvia | 4:03.82 | QS |
| 4. | Victor Partnoi | Romania | 4:04.64 | QR |
| 5. | Jan Bartůněk | Czechoslovakia | 4:15.61 | QR |
| 6. | Tomasz Darski | Poland | 4:23.21 | QR |
| 7. | Park Chang-Gyu | South Korea | 4:23.93 | QR |

==== Heat 2 ====
| Rank | Canoer | Country | Time | Notes |
|---|---|---|---|---|
| 1. | Steve Giles | Canada | 4:03.34 | QS |
| 2. | Nikolay Bukhalov | Bulgaria | 4:03.36 | QS |
| 3. | Aleksandr Kostoglod | Unified Team | 4:04.99 | QS |
| 4. | Peter Liljedahl | Sweden | 4:05.08 | QR |
| 5. | Vlado Poslek | Croatia | 4:09.77 | QR |
| 6. | Fred Spaulding | United States | 4:10.24 | QR |

==== Heat 3 ====
| Rank | Canoer | Country | Time | Notes |
|---|---|---|---|---|
| 1. | György Zala | Hungary | 4:06.43 | QS |
| 2. | Andrew Train | Great Britain | 4:07.44 | QS |
| 3. | José Alfredo Bea | Spain | 4:09.18 | QS |
| 4. | Armando Silega | Cuba | 4:10.76 | QR |
| 5. | Tiit Tikerpe | Estonia | 4:14.73 | QR |
| 6. | José Martínez | Mexico | 4:18.70 | QR |

=== Repechages ===
The top four finishers in each repechage and the fastest fifth-place finisher moved on to the semifinals.

==== Repechage 1 ====
| Rank | Canoer | Country | Time | Notes |
|---|---|---|---|---|
| 1. | Victor Partnoi | Romania | 4:02.67 | QS |
| 2. | Fred Spaulding | United States | 4:04.39 | QS |
| 3. | Armando Silega | Cuba | 4:04.43 | QS |
| 4. | Vlado Poslek | Croatia | 4:05.86 | QS |
| 5. | Park Chang-Gyu | South Korea | 4:06.53 | QS |

==== Repechage 2 ====
| Rank | Canoer | Country | Time | Notes |
|---|---|---|---|---|
| 1. | Jan Bartůněk | Czechoslovakia | 4:02.48 | QS |
| 2. | Peter Liljedahl | Sweden | 4:03.44 | QS |
| 3. | Tiit Tikerpe | Estonia | 4:05.05 | QS |
| 4. | José Martínez | Mexico | 4:06.73 | QS |
| 5. | Tomasz Darski | Poland | 4:11.11 | |

=== Semifinals ===
The top four finishers in each semifinal and the fastest fifth-place finisher advanced to the final.

==== Semifinal 1 ====
| Rank | Canoer | Country | Time | Notes |
|---|---|---|---|---|
| 1. | Matthias Röder | Germany | 4:02.94 | QF |
| 2. | Nikolay Bukhalov | Bulgaria | 4:03.46 | QF |
| 3. | Ivans Klementyev | Latvia | 4:04.12 | QF |
| 4. | György Zala | Hungary | 4:05.29 | QF |
| 5. | Victor Partnoi | Romania | 4:06.58 | QF |
| 6. | José Martínez | Mexico | 4:07.78 | |
| 7. | Armando Silega | Cuba | 4:25.54 | |
| 8. | José Alfredo Bea | Spain | 4:25.63 | |
| - | Peter Liljedahl | Sweden | 4:06.63 | DISQ |

==== Semifinal 2 ====
| Rank | Canoer | Country | Time | Notes |
|---|---|---|---|---|
| 1. | Pascal Sylvoz | France | 4:06.83 | QF |
| 2. | Steve Giles | Canada | 4:08.05 | QF |
| 3. | Jan Bartůněk | Czechoslovakia | 4:08.44 | QF |
| 4. | Andrew Train | Great Britain | 4:09.94 | QF |
| 5. | Aleksandr Kostoglod | Unified Team | 4:10.10 | |
| 6. | Fred Spaulding | United States | 4:13.83 | |
| 7. | Vlado Poslek | Croatia | 4:16.99 | |
| 8. | Park Chang-Gyu | South Korea | 4:29.23 | |
| - | Tiit Tikerpe | Estonia | 4:13.31 | DISQ |

Neither Liljedahl nor Tikerpe's disqualifications were disclosed in the official report.

=== Final ===
The final took place on August 8.

| Rank | Canoer | Country | Time | Notes |
|---|---|---|---|---|
| 1st place, gold medalist(s) | Nikolay Bukhalov | Bulgaria | 4:05.92 | |
| 2nd place, silver medalist(s) | Ivans Klementyev | Latvia | 4:06.60 | |
| 3rd place, bronze medalist(s) | György Zala | Hungary | 4:07.35 | |
| 4. | Matthias Röder | Germany | 4:08.96 | |
| 5. | Pascal Sylvoz | France | 4:09.82 | |
| 6. | Andrew Train | Great Britain | 4:12.58 | |
| 7. | Victor Partnoi | Romania | 4:14.57 | |
| 8. | Jan Bartůněk | Czechoslovakia | 4:15.25 | |
| 9. | Steve Giles | Canada | 4:17.12 | |

Bukhalov used the same tactics to defeat Klementjevs like he did Michał Śliwiński in the C-1 500 m event the previous day. Bukhalov led from start to finish while Klemenjevs moved from fifth to second in the last 250 meters.
