= Canoeing at the 2006 Asian Games – Men's C-1 500 metres =

Men's C-1 500 metres at the 2006 Asian Games
- Venue: West Bay Lagoon
- Date: 13–14 December 2006
- Competitors: 10 from 10 nations

Medalists
gold medal	Yang Wenjun	China
silver medal	Zhomart Satubaldin	Kazakhstan
bronze medal	Vadim Menkov	Uzbekistan

The men's C-1 500 metres sprint canoeing competition at the 2006 Asian Games in Doha was held on 13 and 14 December at the West Bay Lagoon.

== Schedule ==
All times are Arabia Standard Time (UTC+03:00)

Date	Time	Event
Wednesday, 13 December 2006	09:30	Heats
Wednesday, 13 December 2006	14:10	Semifinal
Thursday, 14 December 2006	14:10	Final

== Results ==
=== Heats ===
- Qualification: 1 → Final (QF), 2–4 → Semifinal (QS)

==== Heat 1 ====
Rank	Athlete	Time	Notes
1	Kosuke Fujii (JPN)	2:08.385	QF
2	Trần Đức Thế (VIE)	2:19.429	QS
3	Lee Seung-woo (KOR)	2:19.861	QS
4	Yang Wenjun (CHN)	2:20.221	QS
5	Ankit Pachauri (IND)	2:21.421	
6	Roinadi (INA)	2:27.769	

==== Heat 2 ====
Rank	Athlete	Time	Notes
1	Vadim Menkov (UZB)	2:16.453	QF
2	Shahoo Nasseri (IRI)	2:18.225	QS
3	Zhomart Satubaldin (KAZ)	2:21.357	QS
4	Norwell Cajes (PHI)	2:26.041	QS

=== Semifinal ===
- Qualification: 1–4 → Final (QF)

Rank	Athlete	Time	Notes
1	Zhomart Satubaldin (KAZ)	2:09.843	QF
2	Shahoo Nasseri (IRI)	2:11.707	QF
3	Lee Seung-woo (KOR)	2:11.711	QF
4	Yang Wenjun (CHN)	2:12.227	QF
5	Norwell Cajes (PHI)	2:16.791	
6	Trần Đức Thế (VIE)	2:18.811	

=== Final ===
Rank	Athlete	Time
1st place, gold medalist(s)	Yang Wenjun (CHN)	1:55.009
2nd place, silver medalist(s)	Zhomart Satubaldin (KAZ)	1:59.849
3rd place, bronze medalist(s)	Vadim Menkov (UZB)	2:01.321
4	Lee Seung-woo (KOR)	2:02.265
5	Kosuke Fujii (JPN)	2:06.469
6	Shahoo Nasseri (IRI)	2:17.109
