= Canoeing at the 1996 Summer Olympics – Men's C-2 1000 metres =

Men's C-2 1000 metres at the Games of the XXVI Olympiad
- Venue: Lake Lanier
- Dates: 30 July 1996 (heats); 1 August 1996 (semifinals); 3 August 1996 (final)
- Competitors: 17 boats from 17 nations
- Winning time: 3:31.870

Medalists
1st place, gold medalist(s)		Andreas Dittmer; Gunar Kirchbach	Germany
2nd place, silver medalist(s)		Antonel Borșan; Marcel Glăvan	Romania
3rd place, bronze medalist(s)		Csaba Horváth; György Kolonics	Hungary

The men's C-2 1000 metres event was an open-style, pairs canoeing event conducted as part of the Canoeing at the 1996 Summer Olympics program.

== Medalists ==
Gold	Silver	Bronze
Andreas Dittmer and Gunar Kirchbach (GER)	Marcel Glăvan and Antonel Borșan (ROU)	Csaba Horváth and György Kolonics (HUN)

== Results ==
=== Heats ===
17 teams entered in two heats. The top two finishers from each of the heats advanced directly to the finals and the remaining teams were relegated to the semifinals.

Heat 1
1.	Marcel Glăvan and Antonel Borșan (ROU)	4:06.481	QF
2.	Csaba Horváth and György Kolonics (HUN)	4:08.709	QF
3.	Csaba Orosz and Peter Páleš (SVK)	4:12.789	QS
4.	Martin Marinov and Blagovest Stoyanov (BUL)	4:15.529	QS
5.	Tomasz Goliasz and Dariusz Koszykowski (POL)	4:22.181	QS
6.	Park Chang-Gyu and Jeon Gwang-Rak (KOR)	4:23.961	QS
7.	Steve Giles and Dan Howe (CAN)	4:33.613	QS
8.	Vladimir Shayslamov and Sergey Shayslamov (UZB)	4:43.221	QS
9.	Pieter Lehrer and Jacob Lehrer (ANT)	5:20.421	QS
Heat 2
1.	Andreas Dittmer and Gunar Kirchbach (GER)	4:00.851	QF
2.	Andrew Train and Stephen Train (GBR)	4:01.263	QF
3.	Dražen Funtak and Ivan Šabjan (CRO)	4:02.831	QS
4.	José Alfredo Bea and Oleg Shelestenko (ESP)	4:05.203	QS
5.	Sergei Sergeyev and Kaysar Nurmaganbetov (KAZ)	4:10.399	QS
6.	Oleksandr Lytvynenko and Oleksiy Ihriaev (UKR)	4:13.363	QS
7.	Viktor Reneysky and Nicolae Juravschi (MDA)	4:25.183	QS
8.	Petr Fuksa and Pavel Bednář (CZE)	4:25.295	QS

=== Semifinals ===
Two semifinals took place. The top two finishers from each semifinal and the fastest third-place finisher advanced directly to the final.

Semifinal 1
1.	Steve Giles and Dan Howe (CAN)	3:45.077	QF
2.	Martin Marinov and Blagovest Stoyanov (BUL)	3:45.129	QF
3.	Oleksandr Lytvynenko and Oleksiy Ihriaev (UKR)	3:46.845
4.	Dražen Funtak and Ivan Šabjan (CRO)	3:48.677
5.	Tomasz Goliasz and Dariusz Koszykowski (POL)	3:48.721
6.	Vladimir Shayslamov and Sergey Shayslamov (UZB)	3:57.037
Semifinal 2
1.	Viktor Reneysky and Nicolae Juravschi (MDA)	3:44.008	QF
2.	Csaba Orosz and Peter Páleš (SVK)	3:44.628	QF
3.	José Alfredo Bea and Oleg Shelestenko (ESP)	3:45.616	QF
4.	Sergei Sergeyev and Kaysar Nurmaganbetov (KAZ)	3:51.360
5.	Petr Fuksa and Pavel Bednář (CZE)	3:51.576
6.	Park Chang-Gyu and Jeon Gwang-Rak (KOR)	3:52.044

The Antiguan and Barbudan crew did not participate in the semifinal.

=== Final ===
The final was held on August 3.

Gold	Andreas Dittmer and Gunar Kirchbach (GER)	3:31.870
Silver	Marcel Glăvan and Antonel Borșan (ROU)	3:32.294
Bronze	Csaba Horváth and György Kolonics (HUN)	3:32.514
4.	Martin Marinov and Blagovest Stoyanov (BUL)	3:34.382
5.	Viktor Reneysky and Nicolae Juravschi (MDA)	3:35.198
6.	Andrew Train and Stephen Train (GBR)	3:36.694
7.	Csaba Orosz and Peter Páleš (SVK)	3:36.938
8.	José Alfredo Bea and Oleg Shelestenko (ESP)	3:37.154
9.	Steve Giles and Dan Howe (CAN)	3:46.102

Romania established an early lead, gradually expanding it through the 750 meter mark. Meanwhile, the Germans were in last place after 250 meters before moving up to fourth place at 500 meters. Gathering strength in the third quarter of the race, the Germans launched a sustained sprint to the finish that made up 2.15 seconds on the Romanians in the last 250 meters of the race to pass them right before the finish.
