= Canoeing at the 2002 Asian Games – Men's C-1 1000 metres =

Men's C-1 1000 metres at the 2002 Asian Games
- Venue: Nakdong River
- Date: 10 October 2002
- Competitors: 5 from 5 nations

Medalists
gold medal	Meng Guanliang	China
silver medal	Kaisar Nurmaganbetov	Kazakhstan
bronze medal	Dmitriy Kovalenko	Uzbekistan

The men's C-1 1000 metres sprint canoeing competition at the 2002 Asian Games in Busan was held on 10 October at the Nakdong River.

== Schedule ==
All times are Korea Standard Time (UTC+09:00)

Date	Time	Event
Thursday, 10 October 2002	09:20	Final

== Results ==
Rank	Athlete	Time
1st place, gold medalist(s)	Meng Guanliang (CHN)	3:58.748
2nd place, silver medalist(s)	Kaisar Nurmaganbetov (KAZ)	4:00.452
3rd place, bronze medalist(s)	Dmitriy Kovalenko (UZB)	4:08.948
4	Jun Kwang-rak (KOR)	4:19.280
5	Koji Maruyama (JPN)	4:19.448
