= Cannone =

Cannone is an Italian surname. Notable people with the surname include:

- Cosimo Aldo Cannone (born 1984), Italian motorboat racer
- Domenico Cannone (born 1973), Italian sprint canoeist
- Flavio Cannone (born 1981), Italian trampolinist
- Giuseppe Cannone (born c. 1924), Italian rugby league player
- Patrick Cannone (born 1986), American ice hockey player
- Romain Cannone (born 1997), French fencer
- Niccolò Cannone (born 1998), Italian rugby union player
- Lorenzo Cannone (born 2001), Italian rugby union player
