= Walkowiak =

Walkowiak is a Polish surname. It may refer to:

- Andrzej Walkowiak (born 1961), Polish politician and journalist
- Daniela Walkowiak-Pilecka (born 1935), Polish sprint canoer
- David John Walkowiak (born 1953), American Roman Catholic prelate
- Mariusz Walkowiak (born 1970), Polish sprint canoer
- Roger Walkowiak (1927–2017), French road bicycle racer
