= Canoeing at the 2006 Asian Games – Men's C-2 500 metres =

Men's C-2 500 metres at the 2006 Asian Games
- Venue: West Bay Lagoon
- Date: 13–14 December 2006
- Competitors: 18 from 9 nations

Medalists
gold medal	Alexandr Dyadchuk; Kaisar Nurmaganbetov	Kazakhstan
silver medal	Wang Bing; Yang Wenjun	China
bronze medal	Rustam Mirzadiyarov; Maksim Kiryanov	Uzbekistan

The men's C-2 500 metres sprint canoeing competition at the 2006 Asian Games in Doha was held on 13 and 14 December at the West Bay Lagoon.

== Schedule ==
All times are Arabia Standard Time (UTC+03:00)

Date	Time	Event
Wednesday, 13 December 2006	10:40	Heats
Wednesday, 13 December 2006	14:40	Semifinal
Thursday, 14 December 2006	15:20	Final

== Results ==
=== Heats ===
- Qualification: 1 → Final (QF), 2–4 → Semifinal (QS)

==== Heat 1 ====
Rank	Athlete	Time	Notes
1	Kazakhstan (KAZ); Alexandr Dyadchuk; Kaisar Nurmaganbetov	1:52.747	QF
2	Iran (IRI); Omid Khoshkhoo; Sirvan Ahmadi	1:56.795	QS
3	Indonesia (INA); Asnawir; Roinadi	1:57.127	QS
4	Japan (JPN); Taito Ambo; Kosuke Fujii	1:57.783	QS
5	Vietnam (VIE); Trần Văn Long; Hoàng Hồng Anh	2:01.207	

==== Heat 2 ====
Rank	Athlete	Time	Notes
1	India (IND); Sawlabow; M. Sanjit Singh	1:59.644	QF
2	Uzbekistan (UZB); Rustam Mirzadiyarov; Maksim Kiryanov	2:04.608	QS
3	Philippines (PHI); John Oliver Victorio; Dany Funelas	2:10.800	QS
4	China (CHN); Wang Bing; Yang Wenjun	2:12.810	QS

=== Semifinal ===
- Qualification: 1–4 → Final (QF)

Rank	Athlete	Time	Notes
1	Japan (JPN); Taito Ambo; Kosuke Fujii	1:58.400	QF
2	Uzbekistan (UZB); Rustam Mirzadiyarov; Maksim Kiryanov	1:58.856	QF
3	China (CHN); Wang Bing; Yang Wenjun	1:59.004	QF
4	Indonesia (INA); Asnawir; Roinadi	1:59.460	QF
5	Iran (IRI); Omid Khoshkhoo; Sirvan Ahmadi	1:59.712	
6	Philippines (PHI); John Oliver Victorio; Dany Funelas	2:17.136	

=== Final ===
Rank	Team	Time
1st place, gold medalist(s)	Kazakhstan (KAZ); Alexandr Dyadchuk; Kaisar Nurmaganbetov	1:45.801
2nd place, silver medalist(s)	China (CHN); Wang Bing; Yang Wenjun	1:46.341
3rd place, bronze medalist(s)	Uzbekistan (UZB); Rustam Mirzadiyarov; Maksim Kiryanov	1:47.537
4	Indonesia (INA); Asnawir; Roinadi	1:49.317
5	Japan (JPN); Taito Ambo; Kosuke Fujii	1:55.281
6	India (IND); Sawlabow; M. Sanjit Singh	2:02.597
