= Oleksandr Lytvynenko =

Oleksandr Lytvynenko may refer to:

- Oleksandr Lytvynenko (athlete)
- Oleksandr Lytvynenko (canoeist)
- Oleksandr Lytvynenko (footballer)
- Oleksandr Lytvynenko (politician)
