= Canoeing at the 2002 Asian Games – Men's C-2 500 metres =

Men's C-2 500 metres at the 2002 Asian Games
- Venue: Nakdong River
- Date: 12 October 2002
- Competitors: 12 from 6 nations

Medalists
gold medal	Wang Bing; Yang Wenjun	China
silver medal	Alexandr Buglakov; Alexey Cherchenko	Kazakhstan
bronze medal	Jun Kwang-rak; Park Chang-kyu	South Korea

The men's C-2 500 metres sprint canoeing competition at the 2002 Asian Games in Busan was held on 12 October at the Nakdong River.

== Schedule ==
All times are Korea Standard Time (UTC+09:00)

Date	Time	Event
Saturday, 12 October 2002	10:20	Final

== Results ==
Rank	Team	Time
1st place, gold medalist(s)	China (CHN); Wang Bing; Yang Wenjun	1:43.247
2nd place, silver medalist(s)	Kazakhstan (KAZ); Alexandr Buglakov; Alexey Cherchenko	1:43.451
3rd place, bronze medalist(s)	South Korea (KOR); Jun Kwang-rak; Park Chang-kyu	1:45.251
4	Japan (JPN); Taito Ambo; Masanobu Ozono	1:45.803
5	Uzbekistan (UZB); Dmitriy Muratov; Dmitriy Sockiy	1:49.211
6	North Korea (PRK); Jon Song-jin; Pak Pong-su	1:59.315
