= Canoeing at the 1998 Asian Games – Men's C-1 500 metres =

Men's C-1 500 metres at the 1998 Asian Games
- Venue: Map Prachan Reservoir
- Date: 10–11 December 1998
- Competitors: 12 from 12 nations

Medalists
gold medal	Kaisar Nurmaganbetov	Kazakhstan
silver medal	Dmitriy Kovalenko	Uzbekistan
bronze medal	Lee Seung-woo	South Korea

The men's C-1 500 metres sprint canoeing competition at the 1998 Asian Games in Thailand was held on 10 and 11 December at Map Prachan Reservoir.

== Schedule ==
All times are Indochina Time (UTC+07:00)

Date	Time	Event
Thursday, 10 December 1998	08:30	Heats
Thursday, 10 December 1998	15:00	Semifinal
Friday, 11 December 1998	08:30	Final

== Results ==
Legend

- DNF — Did not finish
- DSQ — Disqualified

=== Heats ===
- Qualification: 1–2 → Final (QF), 3–5 → Semifinal (QS)

==== Heat 1 ====
Rank	Athlete	Time	Notes
1	Lee Seung-woo (KOR)	2:02.64	QF
2	Shinji Abe (JPN)	2:03.41	QF
3	Zaw Win Aung (MYA)	2:08.17	QS
4	Vaga Ram (IND)	2:08.18	QS
5	Abid Khan Afridi (PAK)	2:23.78	QS
6	Nitat Naktong (THA)	2:28.17	

==== Heat 2 ====
Rank	Athlete	Time	Notes
1	Meng Guanliang (CHN)	1:54.75	QF
2	Kaisar Nurmaganbetov (KAZ)	1:56.19	QF
3	Dmitriy Kovalenko (UZB)	2:00.49	QS
4	Hong Yong-guk (PRK)	2:03.47	QS
5	S. Fongvichith (LAO)	2:25.76	QS
6	Reynaldo Comilang (PHI)	2:32.35	

=== Semifinal ===
- Qualification: 1–2 → Final (QF)

Rank	Athlete	Time	Notes
1	Dmitriy Kovalenko (UZB)	2:07.75	QF
2	Hong Yong-guk (PRK)	2:13.04	QF
3	Vaga Ram (IND)	2:17.43	
4	Abid Khan Afridi (PAK)	2:28.25	
—	S. Fongvichith (LAO)	DNF	
—	Zaw Win Aung (MYA)	DNF	

=== Final ===
Rank	Athlete	Time
1st place, gold medalist(s)	Kaisar Nurmaganbetov (KAZ)	2:03.51
2nd place, silver medalist(s)	Dmitriy Kovalenko (UZB)	2:14.41
3rd place, bronze medalist(s)	Lee Seung-woo (KOR)	2:15.64
4	Shinji Abe (JPN)	2:18.91
5	Hong Yong-guk (PRK)	2:24.10
—	Meng Guanliang (CHN)	DSQ
