= Martin Marinov =

Bulgarian-born Australian canoeist

Medal record

Men's canoe sprint

Representing Bulgaria

Olympic Games
Bronze medal – third place	1988 Seoul	C-1 500 m
Bronze medal – third place	1992 Barcelona	C-2 500 m

World Championships
Silver medal – second place	1987 Duisburg	C-1 1000 m
Bronze medal – third place	1989 Plovdiv	C-1 500 m
Bronze medal – third place	1990 Poznań	C-1 500 m
Bronze medal – third place	1994 Mexico City	C-2 500 m
Bronze medal – third place	1995 Duisburg	C-2 200 m

Martin Marinov (Bulgarian: Мартин Маринов, born 25 October 1967) is a Bulgarian-born Australian flatwater canoeist who competed from the late 1980s and the mid-2000s (decade). A former "Mr Bulgaria" he won two Olympic medals for that country in the Canadian canoeing 500 m events. Married for Darina Marinova from 07.05.1989. Kids: Georgi Marinov 08.05.1992 and Maria-Veronika Marinova 14.04.1997. Grandkids: Martin Marinov 27.01.2020

== Biography ==
In Seoul in 1988 he was the bronze medalist in the C-1 500 m. Four years later in Barcelona he and teammate Blagovest Stoyanov won bronze in the C-2 500 m. At the 1996 Summer Olympics, Marinov and Stojanov reached both C-2 finals, finishing fourth in the 1000 m and fifth in the 500 m events, respectively.

Marinov later emigrated and represented Australia. He retired after the 2004 Summer Olympics where he was eliminated in the C-1 500 m semi-final.

He also won five ICF Canoe Sprint World Championships medals with a silver (C-1 1000 m: 1987) and four bronzes (C-1 500 m: 1989, 1990; C-2 200 m: 1995, C-2 500 m: 1994).

During October 2006 and December 2012, Marinov was appointed as Head Coach of the AIS Canoe/Kayak Program.

During 2013–2017 he was a head coach of the Chinese Canoe-kayak National Team and Anhoi Canoe-kayak team.

Marinov participated at 2016 Rio Olympics as the oldest ever Olympian in canoe-kayak disciplines at age of 48 and finished 10th place in C2 1000m and 14th place in C1 1000m.

From 08.2017 Martin Marinov is a Technical Director for flatwater disciplines at the International Canoe Federation (ICF)
