= Huidu =

Huidu is a Romanian surname. Notable people with the surname include:

- Florin Huidu (born 1976), Romanian sprint canoeist
- Șerban Huidu (born 1976), Romanian radio and television personality
