= Dan Howe =

Canadian canoeist (born 1970)

Personal information
- Born: December 31, 1970 (age 55) Kingston, Ontario, Canada

Sport
- Sport: Canoeing
Medal record
Representing Canada
Pan American Games
Gold medal – first place	1995 Mar del Plata	C-2 500m
Bronze medal – third place	1995 Mar del Plata	C-1 1000m

Danny Howe (born December 31, 1970, in Kingston, Ontario) is a Canadian sprint canoer who competed in the mid-1990s. At the 1996 Summer Olympics, paired alongside Steve Giles, he finished ninth in the C-2 1000 m event.
