= Canoeing at the 2002 Asian Games – Men's C-2 1000 metres =

Men's C-2 1000 metres at the 2002 Asian Games
- Venue: Nakdong River
- Date: 10 October 2002
- Competitors: 10 from 5 nations

Medalists
gold medal	Wang Bing; Yang Wenjun	China
silver medal	Taito Ambo; Masanobu Ozono	Japan
bronze medal	Lee Byung-tak; Lee Seung-woo	South Korea

The men's C-2 1000 metres sprint canoeing competition at the 2002 Asian Games in Busan was held on 10 October at the Nakdong River.

== Schedule ==
All times are Korea Standard Time (UTC+09:00)

Date	Time	Event
Thursday, 10 October 2002	10:00	Final

== Results ==
Legend

- DSQ — Disqualified

Rank	Team	Time
1st place, gold medalist(s)	China (CHN); Wang Bing; Yang Wenjun	3:44.382
2nd place, silver medalist(s)	Japan (JPN); Taito Ambo; Masanobu Ozono	3:49.752
3rd place, bronze medalist(s)	South Korea (KOR); Lee Byung-tak; Lee Seung-woo	3:54.348
4	Uzbekistan (UZB); Dmitriy Muratov; Dmitriy Sockiy	4:00.720
—	Kazakhstan (KAZ); Alexandr Buglakov; Alexey Cherchenko	DSQ
