= Ljubek =

Ljubek is a surname. Notable people with the surname include:

- Carlo Ljubek (born 1976), Croatian-German actor
- Matija Ljubek (1953–2000), Croatian canoeist
- Nikica Ljubek (born 1980), Croatian canoeist
