= Kaisar Nurmaganbetov =

Kazakhstani canoeist (born 1977)

Personal information
- Born: August 5, 1977 (age 49) Zhezqazghan
- Height: 185 cm (6 ft 1 in)
- Weight: 78 kg (172 lb)
Medal record
Men's canoe sprint
Representing Kazakhstan
Asian Games
Gold medal – first place	1998 Bangkok	C-1 500 m
Gold medal – first place	2006 Doha	C-2 500 m
Silver medal – second place	1998 Bangkok	C-1 1000 m
Silver medal – second place	2002 Busan	C-1 1000 m
Bronze medal – third place	2002 Busan	C-1 500 m
Asian Championships
Gold medal – first place	2005 Putrajaya	C-2 200 m
Gold medal – first place	2005 Putrajaya	C-2 500 m
Gold medal – first place	2005 Putrajaya	C-2 1000 m
Gold medal – first place	2005 Putrajaya	C-4 200 m
Gold medal – first place	2007 Hwacheon	C-2 200 m
Silver medal – second place	2007 Hwacheon	C-2 500 m
Bronze medal – third place	2005 Putrajaya	C-4 500 m

Kaisar Nurmaganbetov (born August 5, 1977 in Zhezqazghan) is a Kazakhstani sprint canoer who has competed since 1995. At the 1996 Summer Olympics, he was eliminated in the semifinals of both the C-2 500 m and the C-2 1000 m events. Four years later, Nurmaganbetov again reached the semifinals, in the C-1 500 m and the C-1 1000 m events but that is where he was eliminated. He was eliminated in the semifinals of those same events at the 2004 Summer Olympics in Athens. For his most recent Summer Olympics in Beijing, Nurmaganbetov was eliminated in the semifinals of the C-2 500 m event.
