= Tomasz Darski =

Polish canoeist (born 1962)

Tomasz Darski (born April 26, 1962 in Wrocław) is a Polish sprint canoer who competed in the early 1990s. At the 1992 Summer Olympics in Barcelona, he was eliminated in the repechages of the C-1 1000 m event and the semifinals of the C-2 500 m event.
