= Waldemar Fibigr =

Czechoslovak sprint canoer (1966–2022)

Medal record

Men's canoe sprint

World Championships
Silver medal – second place	1995 Duisburg	C-4 200 m
Bronze medal – third place	1993 Copenhagen	C-4 500 m
Bronze medal – third place	1994 Mexico City	C-4 200 m

Waldemar Fibigr (20 June 1966 – 21 October 2022) was a Czechoslovak sprint canoer who competed from the late 1980s to the late 1990s. He won three medals at the ICF Canoe Sprint World Championships with a silver (C-4 200 m: 1995) and two bronzes (C-4 200 m: 1994; C-4 500 m: 1993).

Fibgir also competed in two Summer Olympics, earning his best finish of ninth in the C-2 500 m event at Barcelona in 1992.

Fibigr died on 21 October 2022, at the age of 56.
