= Armando Silega =

Cuban sprint canoeist (born 1962)

Personal information
- Born: October 26, 1962 (age 63) Santiago de Cuba, Cuba

Sport
- Sport: Canoe
Medal record
Representing Cuba
Pan American Games
| Gold medal – first place | 1991 Havana | C-1 500m |
| Gold medal – first place | 1991 Havana | C-1 1000m |
| Silver medal – second place | 1987 Indianapolis | C-1 1000m |
Central American and Caribbean Games
| Gold medal – first place | 1990 Mexico City | C-1 1000m |
| Gold medal – first place | 1990 Mexico City | C-1 10,000m |
| Gold medal – first place | 1993 Ponce | C-1 200m |
| Gold medal – first place | 1993 Ponce | C-1 500m |
| Silver medal – second place | 1993 Ponce | C-1 1000m |

Armando Silega Carbonell (born October 26, 1962) is a Cuban sprint canoer who competed in the early 1990s. At the 1992 Summer Olympics in Barcelona, he was eliminated in the semifinals of both the C-1 500 m and the C-1 1000 m events.
