= Marcin Kobierski =

Polish canoeist

Medal record

Men's canoe sprint

World Championships
Gold medal – first place	2001 Poznań	C-2 1000 m
Gold medal – first place	2002 Seville	C-2 1000 m

European Championships
Silver medal – second place	2002 Szeged	C2-1000 m
Bronze medal – third place	2001 Milan	C4-500 m

Marcin Kobierski (born April 13, 1977) is a Polish sprint canoer who competed from the late 1990s to the early 2000s. He won two gold medals in the C-2 1000 m event at the ICF Canoe Sprint World Championships, earning them in 2001 and 2002.

Paired with Paweł Baraszkiewicz, Kobierski also competed in the C-2 500 m event at the 1996 Summer Olympics in Atlanta, but was eliminated in the semifinal round.
