= Tiit Tikerpe =

Estonian canoeist

Tiit Tikerpe (born September 7, 1965 in Tartu) is an Estonian sprint canoer who competed in the early 1990s. At the 1992 Summer Olympics in Barcelona, he was eliminated in the semifinals of the C-1 500 m event while being disqualified in the semifinals of the C-1 1000 m event.
