= Csaba Orosz =

Slovak canoeist

Medal record

Men's canoe sprint

World Championships
Bronze medal – third place	1994 Mexico City	C-4 500 m

Csaba Orosz (born August 10, 1971 in Dunajská Streda) is a Slovak sprint canoer of Hungarian ethnicity who competed in the mid-1990s. He won a bronze medal in the C-4 500 m event at the 1994 ICF Canoe Sprint World Championships in Mexico City.

Orosz also competed at the 1996 Summer Olympics in Atlanta, finishing seventh in the C-2 1000 m and eighth in the C-2 500 m events.
