= Vlado Poslek =

Croatian canoeist

Vlado Poslek (born 16 October 1969) is a Croatian canoe sprinter who competed in the early 1990s. At the 1992 Summer Olympics in Barcelona, he was eliminated in the semifinals of the C-1 1000 m event, placing 13th overall.
