= Sergey Sergeyev (canoeist) =

Kazakhstani canoeist

Personal information
- Born: October 23, 1976 (age 49) Guryev, Guryev Region
- Height: 173 cm (5 ft 8 in)
- Weight: 72 kg (159 lb)
Medal record
Men's canoe sprint
Representing Kazakhstan
Asian Games
Gold medal – first place	1994 Hiroshima	C-2 500 m
Gold medal – first place	1994 Hiroshima	C-2 1000 m
Gold medal – first place	1998 Bangkok	C-2 500 m
Gold medal – first place	1998 Bangkok	C-2 1000 m

Sergei Sergeyev (Сергей Сергеев, born October 23, 1976) is a Kazakhstani sprint canoer who competed in the mid-1990s. At the 1996 Summer Olympics in Atlanta, he was eliminated in the semifinals of both the C-2 500 m and the C-2 1000 m events.
