= István Szijarto =

Hungarian canoeist

Medal record

Men's canoe sprint

World Championships
Bronze medal – third place	1994 Mexico City	K-2 1000 m

István Szijarto is a Hungarian sprint canoer who competed in the mid-1990s. He won a bronze medal in the K-2 1000 m event at the 1994 ICF Canoe Sprint World Championships in Mexico City.
