= Canoeing at the 1992 Summer Olympics – Men's C-2 500 metres =

1992 open-style, pairs canoeing event

The men's C-2 500 metres event was an open-style, pairs canoeing event conducted as part of the Canoeing at the 1992 Summer Olympics program.

== Medalists ==
Gold	Silver	Bronze
Dmitri Dovgalenok and Aleksandr Maseikov (EUN)	Ulrich Papke and Ingo Spelly (GER)	Martin Marinov and Blagovest Stoyanov (BUL)

== Results ==
=== Heats ===
15 teams entered in two heats. The top two finishers from each of the heats advanced directly to the final while the remaining teams were relegated to the semifinals.

Heat 1
1.	Gheorghe Andriev and Nicolae Juravschi (ROU)	1:43.89	QF
2.	Martin Marinov and Blagovest Stoyanov (BUL)	1:44.00	QF
3.	Didier Hoyer and Olivier Boivin (FRA)	1:44.46	QS
4.	Dmitri Dovgalenok and Aleksandr Maseikov (EUN)	1:45.25	QS
5.	Arne Nielsson and Christian Frederiksen (DEN)	1:49.58	QS
6.	Juan Aballí and Fernando Zamora (CUB)	1:53.50	QS
7.	José Martínez and José Ramón Ferrer (MEX)	1:55.50	QS
8.	Katsuya Toyama and Tsunehisa Uchino (JPN)	1:55.69	QS
Heat 2
1.	Ulrich Papke and Ingo Spelly (GER)	1:40.53	QF
2.	Attila Pálizs and György Kolonics (HUN)	1:41.71	QF
3.	Jan Bartůněk and Waldemar Fibigr (TCH)	1:42.42	QS
4.	Larry Cain and David Frost (CAN)	1:43.12	QS
5.	Narcisco Suárez and Enrique Míguez (ESP)	1:43.63	QS
6.	Stewart Carr and Jim Terrell (USA)	1:46.85	QS
7.	Tomasz Darski and Andrzej Sołoducha (POL)	1:46.93	QS

=== Semifinals ===
Two semifinals were held. The top two finishers from each semifinal and the fastest third-place finisher advanced to the final.

Semifinal 1
1.	Dmitri Dovgalenok and Aleksandr Maseikov (EUN)	1:40.74	QF
2.	Arne Nielsson and Christian Frederiksen (DEN)	1:41.58	QF
3.	Jan Bartůněk and Waldemar Fibigr (TCH)	1:42.18	QF
4.	José Martínez and José Ramón Ferrer (MEX)	1:46.55
5.	Stewart Carr and Jim Terrell (USA)	1:46.62
6.	Katsuya Toyama and Tsunehisa Uchino (JPN)	1:47.58
Semifinal 2
1.	Didier Hoyer and Olivier Boivin (FRA)	1:42.09	QF
2.	Larry Cain and David Frost (CAN)	1:42.35	QF
3.	Tomasz Darski and Andrzej Sołoducha (POL)	1:42.72
4.	Enrique Míguez and Narcisco Suárez (ESP)	1:42.82
5.	Juan Aballí and Fernando Zamora (CUB)	1:43.04

=== Final ===
The final was held on August 7.

Gold	Dmitri Dovgalenok and Aleksandr Maseikov (EUN)	1:41.54
Silver	Ulrich Papke and Ingo Spelly (GER)	1:41.68
Bronze	Martin Marinov and Blagovest Stoyanov (BUL)	1:41.94
4.	Gheorghe Andriev and Nicolae Juravschi (ROU)	1:42.84
5.	Arne Nielsson and Christian Frederiksen (DEN)	1:42.92
6.	Didier Hoyer and Olivier Boivin (FRA)	1:43.04
7.	Attila Pálizs and György Kolonics (HUN)	1:43.27
8.	Jan Bartůněk and Waldemar Fibigr (TCH)	1:44.70
9.	Larry Cain and David Frost (CAN)	1:45.76
