= 1994 ICF Canoe Sprint World Championships =

International canoe competition

- Host city: Mexico City, Mexico at neighboring Xochimilco

The 1994 ICF Canoe Sprint World Championships were held in Mexico City, Mexico for the second time at neighboring Xochimilco. The Mexican city had hosted the event previously in 1974 at the same venue that hosted the canoeing and rowing competitions for the 1968 Summer Olympics.

The men's competition consisted of nine Canadian (single paddle, open boat) and nine kayak events. Six events were held for the women, all in kayak. The 10000 m events for men (Two canoe and three kayak) and 5000 m events for women (two in kayak) were dropped from the program (Three events at 5000 m (men's C-1, and men's and women's K-1) resumed at the 2010 championships.) and the 200 m events for C-1, C-2, and C-4 (men only), and K-1, K-2, and K-4 (both men and women) took their place. This represented the greatest change in the championships program since their reconstitution in 1950 following both World War II and the 1948 Summer Olympics.

This was the 26th championships in canoe sprint.

== Medal summary ==
=== Men's ===
==== Canoe ====
Event	Gold	Time	Silver	Time	Bronze	Time
C-1 200 m	Nikolay Bukhalov (BUL)	41.869	Ervin Hoffman (HUN)	42.241	Michał Śliwiński (UKR)	42.281
C-1 500 m	Nikolay Bukhalov (BUL)	1:55.264	Imre Pulai (HUN)	1:56.752	Michał Śliwiński (UKR)	1:57.056
C-1 1000 m	Ivan Klementiev (POL)	4:08.144	Nikolay Bukhalov (BUL)	4:08.208	Victor Partnoi (ROU)	4:10.424
C-2 200 m	Belarus; Aleksandr Masseykov; Dmitriy Dovgailyonok	39.792	Hungary; György Kolonics; Csaba Horváth	40.000	France; Oliver Bolivn; Sylvain Hoyer	40.400
C-2 500 m	Romania; Gheorghe Andriev; Grigore Obreja	1:47.780	Hungary; György Kolonics; Csaba Horváth	1:48.452	Bulgaria; Blagovest Stoyanov; Martin Marinov	1:49.812
C-2 1000 m	Germany; Andreas Dittmer; Gunar Kirchbach	3:50.100	Hungary; Ferenc Novák; Gáspár Boldiszár	3:51.988	Poland; Dariusz Koszykowski; Tomasz Goliasz	3:52.484
C-4 200 m	Russia; Pavel Konovalov; Andrey Kabanov; Sergey Chemerov; Aleksandr Kostoglod	35.412	Hungary; György Kolonics; Csaba Horváth; Attila Szabó; Ervin Hoffman	35.524	Czech Republic; Petr Procházka; Tomáš Křivánek; Roman Dittrich; Waldemar Fibgir	36.020
C-4 500 m	Hungary; Ervin Hoffman; Attila Szabó; Gáspár Boldiszár; Ferenc Novák	1:30.464	Romania; Marcel Glăvan; Cosmin Pașca; Antonel Borșan; Florin Popescu	1:30.480	Slovakia; Slavomír Kňazovický; Peter Páleš; Csaba Orosz; Juraj Filip	1:32.592
C-4 1000 m	Hungary; Imre Pulai; György Kolonics; Tibor Takács; Csaba Horváth	3:26.708	Romania; Marcel Glăvan; Cosmin Pașca; Antonel Borșan; Florin Popescu	3:29.872	Mexico; Juan Martínez; Antonio Romero; Ramón Ferrer; Benjamín Castaneda	3:34.648

==== Kayak ====
Event	Gold	Time	Silver	Time	Bronze	Time
K-1 200 m	Sergey Kalesnik (BLR)	36.737	Vince Fehérvári (HUN)	37.445	Miguel García (ESP)	37.541
K-1 500 m	Zsombor Borhi (HUN)	1:42.236	Daniel Collins (AUS)	1:42.416	Knut Holmann (NOR)	1:42.876
K-1 1000 m	Clint Robinson (AUS)	3:38.714	Zsolt Borhi (HUN)	3:38.962	Knut Holmann (NOR)	3:40.842
K-2 200 m	Poland; Maciej Freimut; Adam Wysocki	36.156	Romania; Romică Șerban; Daniel Stoian	36.180	Germany; Kay Bluhm; Torsten Guitsche	36.324
K-2 500 m	Germany; Kay Bluhm; Torsten Guitsche	1:33.108	Hungary; András Rajna; Attila Adrovicz	1:33.588	Australia; Martin Hunter; Clint Robinson	1:33.876
K-2 1000 m	Denmark; Jesper Staal; Thor Nielsen	3:21.268	Italy; Antonio Rossi; Daniele Scarpa	3:22.772	Hungary; István Beé; István Szijarto	3:25.908
K-4 200 m	Russia; Anatoly Tishchenko; Oleg Gorobiy; Sergey Verlin; Viktor Denisov	32.180	Romania; Floran Scoica; Sorin Petcu; Marin Popescu; Geza Magyar	32.308	Ukraine; Michał Śliwiński; Andrey Petrov; Yuriy Kichayev; Andrey Borzukov	32.452
K-4 500 m	Russia; Viktor Denisov; Anatoly Tishchenko; Sergey Verlin; Oleg Gorobiy	1:21.488	Romania; Floran Scoica; Sorin Petcu; Marin Popescu; Geza Magyar	1:21.900	Hungary; Gábor Horváth; Ferenc Csipes; Zoltán Antal; Róbert Hegedűs	1:22.264
K-4 1000 m	Russia; Viktor Denisov; Anatoly Tishchenko; Aleksandr Ivanik; Oleg Gorobiy	3:01.408	Poland; Piotr Markiewicz; Grzegorz Kotowicz; Adam Wysocki; Marek Witkowski	3:02.368	Germany; Thomas Reineck; Oliver Kegel; André Wohllebe; Mario von Appen	3:02.680

=== Women's ===
==== Kayak ====
Event	Gold	Time	Silver	Time	Bronze	Time
K-1 200 m	Rita Kőbán (HUN)	42.904	Anna Olsson (SWE)	42.984	Caroline Brunet (CAN)	43.244
K-1 500 m	Birgit Schmidt (GER)	1:53.552	Rita Kőbán (HUN)	1:54.196	Josefa Idem (ITA)	1:54.640
K-2 200 m	Hungary; Éva Dónusz; Eva Laky	40.252	Germany; Birgit Schmidt; Daniela Gleue	40.492	Poland; Barbara Hacjel; Elżbieta Urbańczyk	40.828
K-2 500 m	Poland; Elżbieta Urbańczyk; Barbara Hacjel	1:49.684	Hungary; Kinga Czigány; Szilvia Mednyánszky	1:50.804	Germany; Birgit Schmidt; Daniela Gleue	1:51.396
K-4 200 m	Hungary; Éva Dónusz; Szilvia Mednyánszky; Eva Laky; Rita Kőbán	37.120	Germany; Birgit Schmidt; Anett Schuck; Ramona Portwich; Daniela Gleue	37.168	Canada; Caroline Brunet; Klari MacAskill; Alison Herst; Corrina Kennedy	37.328
K-4 500 m	Germany; Birgit Schmidt; Ramona Portwich; Anett Schuck; Daniela Gleue	1:35.588	Hungary; Kinga Czigány; Éva Dónusz; Rita Kőbán; Szilvia Mednyánszky	1:35.952	Sweden; Anna Olsson; Susanne Rosenqvist; Maria Haglund; Ignela Ericsson	1:37.648

== Medals table ==
Rank	Nation	Gold	Silver	Bronze	Total
1	Hungary	6	12	2	20
2	Germany	4	2	3	9
3	Russia	4	0	0	4
4	Poland	3	1	2	6
5	Bulgaria	2	1	1	4
6	Belarus	2	0	0	2
7	Romania	1	5	1	7
8	Australia	1	1	1	3
9	Denmark	1	0	0	1
10	Italy	0	1	1	2
10	Sweden	0	1	1	2
12	Ukraine	0	0	3	3
13	Canada	0	0	2	2
13	Norway	0	0	2	2
15	Czech Republic	0	0	1	1
15	France	0	0	1	1
15	Mexico	0	0	1	1
15	Slovakia	0	0	1	1
15	Spain	0	0	1	1
Totals (19 entries)		24	24	24	72
