= Mariusz Walkowiak =

Polish sprint canoer (born 1970)

Mariusz Walkowiak (born August 17, 1970 in Poznań) is a Polish sprint canoer who competed in the early 1990s. At the 1992 Summer Olympics in Barcelona, he was eliminated in the semifinals of both the C-1 500 m and the C-1 1000 m events.
