= Ferenc Novák =

Hungarian canoeist

Medal record

Men's canoe sprint

Representing Hungary
Event	1st	2nd	3rd
Olympic Games	1	0	0
World Championships	3	3	1
European Championships	2	0	1
Total	6	3	2

Olympic Games
Gold medal – first place	2000 Sydney	C-2 500 m

World Championships
Gold medal – first place	1993 Copenhagen	C-4 500 m
Gold medal – first place	1994 Mexico City	C-4 500 m
Gold medal – first place	2003 Gainesville	C-4 1000 m
Silver medal – second place	1994 Mexico City	C-2 1000 m
Silver medal – second place	1995 Duisburg	C-4 1000 m
Silver medal – second place	1999 Milan	C-2 500 m
Bronze medal – third place	2003 Gainesville	C-4 500 m

Ferenc Novák (born July 13, 1969, in Budapest) is a Hungarian sprint canoeist who has competed from the early 1990s to 2006. At the 2000 Summer Olympics in Sydney, he won a gold medal in the C-2 500 m event with teammate Imre Pulai.

In the four-man (C-4) canoe he has won a total of three world championship gold medals (1993, 1994 and 2003), as well as two European golds (2002 and 2004). Novák won a total of six medals at the ICF Canoe Sprint World Championships.

His last success came at the 2006 European Championships, held in Račice, Czech Republic, where he won a C-4 500 m bronze medal.

Novak is currently a member of the Budapest Honvéd FC club.

Height: 173 cm (5 ft 8 in); weight 77 kg (170 lb)

== Awards ==
- Perpetual champion of Hungarian Kayak-Canoe

Orders and special awards

- Order of Merit of the Republic of Hungary – Officer's Cross (2000)
