= Petr Fuksa =

Czech canoeist

Medal record

Men's canoe sprint

World Championships
Gold medal – first place	1998 Szeged	C-4 200 m
Gold medal – first place	2006 Szeged	C-4 200 m
Silver medal – second place	1999 Milan	C-4 200 m
Silver medal – second place	2001 Poznań	C-4 200 m
Silver medal – second place	2002 Seville	C-2 200 m
Silver medal – second place	2002 Seville	C-4 200 m
Silver medal – second place	2003 Gainesville	C-2 200 m
Silver medal – second place	2003 Gainesville	C-4 200 m
Silver medal – second place	2005 Zagreb	C-4 200 m
Bronze medal – third place	1997 Dartmouth	C-2 200 m
Bronze medal – third place	1997 Dartmouth	C-4 200 m

Petr Fuksa (born 28 September 1969 in Nymburk) is a Czech sprint and marathon canoeist who competed from 1996 to 2006. He won eleven medals at the ICF Canoe Sprint World Championships with two golds (C-4 200 m: 1998, 2006), seven silvers (C-2 200 m: 2002, 2003; C-4 200 m: 1999, 2001, 2002, 2003, 2005), and two bronze (C-2 200 m: 1997); C-4 200 m: 1997.

Fuksa also competed at the 1996 Summer Olympics in Atlanta. Paired with Pavel Bednář, he was eliminated in the semifinal rounds in both the C-2 500 m and C-2 1000 m events. His son Martin Fuksa is a world class canoeist as well, winning the C-1 500m at Moscow 2016 and competing at the Rio Olympic games.

== Personal life ==
Fuksa is the father of Olympic champion Martin and Olympic canoeist Petr Fuksa Jr.
