= Pavel Bednář =

Czech canoeist (born 1970)

Personal information
- Born: 25 June 1970 (age 56)

Sport
- Country: Czech
- Sport: Canoe sprint Canoe marathon
Medal record
Representing Czech Republic
Men's canoe sprint
World Championships
Silver medal – second place	1993 Copenhagen	C-1 10000 m
Bronze medal – third place	1997 Dartmouth	C-2 200 m
Men's canoe marathon
World Championships
Gold medal – first place	2001 Stockton-on-Tees	C-1
Gold medal – first place	2002 Zamora	C-1
Gold medal – first place	2003 Valladolid	C-1
Silver medal – second place	1999 Győr	C-1
Silver medal – second place	2000 Dartmouth	C-1

Pavel Bednář (born 25 June 1970) is a Czech sprint canoeist and marathon canoeist who competed in the 1990s. He won two medals at the ICF Canoe Sprint World Championships with a silver (C-1 10000 m: 1993) and a bronze (C-2 200 m: 1997). He also won three gold medals at the ICF Canoe Marathon World Championships.

== Career ==
Bednář also competed at the 1996 Summer Olympics in Atlanta. Paired with Petr Fuksa, he was eliminated in the semifinals of both the C-2 500 m and the C-2 1000 m events.
