= Antonel Borșan =

Romanian canoeist

Medal record

Men's canoe sprint

Representing Romania

Olympic Games
Silver medal – second place	1996 Atlanta	C-2 1000 m

World Championships
Gold medal – first place	1995 Duisburg	C-4 1000 m
Gold medal – first place	1997 Dartmouth	C-4 1000 m
Silver medal – second place	1994 Mexico City	C-4 500 m
Silver medal – second place	1994 Mexico City	C-4 1000 m
Silver medal – second place	1995 Duisburg	C-2 1000 m
Silver medal – second place	1995 Duisburg	C-4 500 m
Silver medal – second place	1997 Dartmouth	C-4 500 m

Antonel Borșan (born 29 April 1970 in Liești, Galați County) is a Romanian sprint canoer who competed in the mid-1990s. He won an Olympic silver medal at the 1996 Summer Olympics in the C-2 1000 m event with Marcel Glăvan.

Borșan also won seven medals at the ICF Canoe Sprint World Championships with two golds (C-4 1000 m: 1995, 1997) and five silvers (C-2 1000 m: 1995, C-4 500 m: 1994, 1995, 1997; C-4 1000 m: 1994).
