= Oleg Shelestenko =

Spanish canoeist (born 1972)

Oleg Shelestenko (born October 6, 1972) is a Ukrainian-born Spanish sprint canoer who competed in the mid-1990s. At the 1996 Summer Olympics in Atlanta, paired with José Alfredo Bea, he finished seventh in the C-2 500 m event and eighth in the C-2 1000 m event.
