= Maxim Boilard =

Canadian sprint canoer

Personal information
- Born: June 26, 1978 (age 48) Quebec City, Quebec, Canada
Medal record
Men's canoe sprint
World Championships
| Silver medal – second place | 2002 Seville | C-4 1000 m |
| Silver medal – second place | 2003 Gainesville | C-4 1000 m |
Pan American Games
| Silver medal – second place | 1999 Winnipeg | C-2 500 m |

Maxime Boilard (sometimes listed as Maxim Boilard, born June 26, 1978) is a Canadian sprint canoer who competed from the mid-1990s through 2004. He was born in Quebec City, Quebec. His career highlight was a fourth-place finish in the C-1 500 m event at the 2000 Summer Olympics in Sydney. He also won two silver medals in the C-4 1000 m event at the ICF Canoe Sprint World Championships in 2002 and 2003. He was a silver medalist in the C-2 500 m event at the 1999 Pan American Games in Winnipeg.

Since his paddling career ended, Boilard has become a successful businessperson in Quebec, founding CANU, a company that supports corporate leadership development. In 2008 and 2012, Boilard served as a French-language analyst for Radio Canada and Reseau des Sports at the Olympic Games, covering canoe-kayak and rowing. In 2008, he was selected as a member of the Governor General's Canadian Leadership Conference.
