= Johnny Rommel =

Indian canoeist

Medal record
Men's canoe sprint
Representing India
Asian Games
Bronze medal – third place	1994 Hiroshima	C-2 1000 m

Johnny Rommel is an Indian canoeing athlete who had won the bronze medal in men's C-2 1000M at the 1994 Asian Games.
