= Daniela Gleue =

German canoeist

Medal record

Women's canoe sprint

World Championships
Gold medal – first place	1993 Copenhagen	K-4 500 m
Gold medal – first place	1994 Mexico City	K-4 500 m
Silver medal – second place	1994 Mexico City	K-2 200 m
Silver medal – second place	1994 Mexico City	K-4 200 m
Bronze medal – third place	1994 Mexico City	K-2 500 m

Daniela Gleue is a German sprint canoer who competed in the mid-1990s. She won five medals at the ICF Canoe Sprint World Championships with two golds (K-2 500 m: 1993, 1994), two silvers (K-2 200 m and K-4 200 m: both 1994), and a bronze (K-2 500 m: 1994).
