= Juraj Filip =

Slovak sprint canoer

Medal record

Men's canoe sprint

World Championships
Bronze medal – third place	1994 Mexico City	C-4 500 m

Juraj Filip is a Slovak sprint canoer who competed in the mid-1990s. He won a bronze medal in the C-4 500 m event at the 1994 ICF Canoe Sprint World Championships in Mexico City.
