= Antonio Marmorino =

Italian canoeist (born 1973)

Antonio Marmorino (born 25 January 1973) is an Italian sprint canoer who competed in the mid-1990s. At the 1996 Summer Olympics in Atlanta, he was eliminated in the semifinals of the C-2 500 m event.
