= Tomasz Goliasz =

Polish canoeist

Medal record

Men's canoe sprint

World Championships
Silver medal – second place	1989 Plovdiv	C-2 500 m
Bronze medal – third place	1994 Mexico City	C-2 1000 m

Tomasz Goliasz (born July 6, 1968) is a Polish sprint canoer who competed from the late 1980s to the mid-1990s. He won two medals at the ICF Canoe Sprint World Championships with a silver (C-2 500 m: 1989) and a bronze (1994).

Goliasz also finished fifth in the C-2 1000 m semifinal at the 1996 Summer Olympics in Atlanta, but did not advance to the final.
