= Canoeing at the 2002 Asian Games – Men's C-1 500 metres =

Men's C-1 500 metres at the 2002 Asian Games
- Venue: Nakdong River
- Date: 12 October 2002
- Competitors: 5 from 5 nations

Medalists
gold medal	Meng Guanliang	China
silver medal	Park Chang-kyu	South Korea
bronze medal	Kaisar Nurmaganbetov	Kazakhstan

The men's C-1 500 metres sprint canoeing competition at the 2002 Asian Games in Busan was held on 12 October at the Nakdong River.

== Schedule ==
All times are Korea Standard Time (UTC+09:00)

Date	Time	Event
Saturday, 12 October 2002	09:20	Final

== Results ==
Rank	Athlete	Time
1st place, gold medalist(s)	Meng Guanliang (CHN)	1:51.332
2nd place, silver medalist(s)	Park Chang-kyu (KOR)	1:51.728
3rd place, bronze medalist(s)	Kaisar Nurmaganbetov (KAZ)	1:52.388
4	Dmitriy Kovalenko (UZB)	1:53.936
5	Masanobu Ozono (JPN)	1.55.430
