= Florin Scoica =

Romanian canoeist

Medal record

Men's canoe sprint

World Championships
Silver medal – second place	1994 Mexico City	K-4 200 m
Silver medal – second place	1994 Mexico City	K-4 500 m

Florin Scoica is a Romanian sprint canoer who competed in the mid-1990s to the early 2000s. He won two silver medals at the 1994 ICF Canoe Sprint World Championships in Mexico City, earning them in the K-4 200 m and K-4 500 m events.
