= Dražen Funtak =

Croatian canoeist (born 1975)

Dražen Funtak (born 6 July 1975 in Osijek) is a Croatian sprint canoer who competed from the mid-1990s to the early 2000s (decade). At the 1996 Summer Olympics in Atlanta, he was eliminated in the semifinals of the C-1 500 m, C-2 500 m, and C-2 1000 m events. Four years later in Sydney, Huidu was eliminated in the semifinals of the C-2 500 m event.
