= Franco Lizzio =

Italian sprint canoer (born 1963)

Franco Lizzio (born July 21, 1963) is an Italian sprint canoer who competed in the early 1990s. At the 1992 Summer Olympics in Barcelona, he was eliminated in the semifinals of the C-1 500 m event.
