= Canoeing at the 1998 Asian Games – Men's C-1 1000 metres =

Men's C-1 1000 metres at the 1998 Asian Games
- Venue: Map Prachan Reservoir
- Date: 8–9 December 1998
- Competitors: 12 from 12 nations

Medalists
gold medal	Meng Guanliang	China
silver medal	Kaisar Nurmaganbetov	Kazakhstan
bronze medal	Lee Seung-woo	South Korea

The men's C-1 1000 metres sprint canoeing competition at the 1998 Asian Games in Thailand was held on 8 and 9 December at Map Prachan Reservoir.

== Schedule ==
All times are Indochina Time (UTC+07:00)

Date	Time	Event
Tuesday, 8 December 1998	08:30	Heats
Tuesday, 8 December 1998	15:00	Semifinal
Wednesday, 9 December 1998	08:30	Final

== Results ==
Legend

- DNS — Did not start

=== Heats ===
- Qualification: 1–2 → Final (QF), 3–5 → Semifinal (QS)

==== Heat 1 ====
Rank	Athlete	Time	Notes
1	Meng Guanliang (CHN)	5:00.66	QF
2	Dmitriy Kovalenko (UZB)	5:09.69	QF
3	Vaga Ram (IND)	5:24.00	QS
4	Zaw Win Aung (MYA)	5:27.22	QS
5	Hong Yong-guk (PRK)	5:46.84	QS
6	Suradaj Dittavimon (THA)	5:47.77	

==== Heat 2 ====
Rank	Athlete	Time	Notes
1	Kaisar Nurmaganbetov (KAZ)	5:05.84	QF
2	Shinji Abe (JPN)	5:21.88	QF
3	Lee Seung-woo (KOR)	5:28.35	QS
4	Nasir Iqbal (PAK)	8:32.61	QS
—	Reynaldo Comilang (PHI)	DNS	
—	Keopasaouth Xaygnasan (LAO)	DNS	

=== Semifinal ===
- Qualification: 1–2 → Final (QF)

Rank	Athlete	Time	Notes
1	Lee Seung-woo (KOR)	4:23.52	QF
2	Vaga Ram (IND)	4:25.27	QF
3	Hong Yong-guk (PRK)	4:26.99	
4	Zaw Win Aung (MYA)	4:53.24	
5	Nasir Iqbal (PAK)	5:13.05	

=== Final ===
Rank	Athlete	Time
1st place, gold medalist(s)	Meng Guanliang (CHN)	4:36.06
2nd place, silver medalist(s)	Kaisar Nurmaganbetov (KAZ)	4:40.67
3rd place, bronze medalist(s)	Lee Seung-woo (KOR)	4:52.74
4	Shinji Abe (JPN)	4:53.71
5	Dmitriy Kovalenko (UZB)	5:02.02
6	Vaga Ram (IND)	5:19.71
