= José Manuel Crespo =

Spanish canoeist

José Manuel Crespo (born April 4, 1972) is a Spanish sprint canoer who competed from the mid-1990s to the early 2000s. At the 1996 Summer Olympics in Atlanta, he was eliminated in the semifinals both of the C-1 500 m and the C-1 1000 m events. Four years later in Sydney, Crespo was eliminated in the semifinals of the same event.
