= Ivan Kireyev =

Uzbek sprint canoer (born 1967)

Personal information
- Born: March 22, 1967 (age 59)
- Height: 184 cm (6 ft 0 in)
- Weight: 60 kg (132 lb)
Medal record
Men's canoe sprint
Representing Uzbekistan
Asian Games
Gold medal – first place	1994 Hiroshima	K-1 500 m
Gold medal – first place	1994 Hiroshima	K-1 1000 m
Gold medal – first place	1994 Hiroshima	K-4 1000 m
Silver medal – second place	1994 Hiroshima	K-4 500 m

Ivan Kireyev (Иван Киреев, born March 22, 1967) is an Uzbek sprint canoer who competed in the early to mid-1990s. Competing for the Unified Team, he was eliminated in the semifinals of the K-2 1000 m event at the 1992 Summer Olympics in Barcelona. Four years later in Atlanta, Kireyev was eliminated in the repechages of the K-1 1000 m event while competing for Uzbekistan.
