= Barbara Hajcel =

Polish sprint canoer

Medal record

Women's canoe sprint

World Championships
| Gold medal – first place | 1994 Mexico City | K-2 500 m |
| Bronze medal – third place | 1994 Mexico City | K-2 200 m |

Barbara Hajcel (born 10 December 1971 in Poznań) is a Polish sprint canoer who competed in the mid-1990s. She won two medals at the 1994 ICF Canoe Sprint World Championships in Mexico City with a gold in the K-2 500 m event and a bronze in the K-2 200 m event.
