= Peter Liljedahl =

Swedish canoeist (born 1967)

Peter Liljedahl (born 18 February 1967) is a professor of mathematics education and a Swedish sprint canoeist. Liljedahl competed in the early 1990s. At the 1992 Summer Olympics in Barcelona, he was eliminated in the semifinals of the C-1 500 m event while being disqualified in the semifinals of the C-1 1000 m event.

Liljedahl is a professor of mathematics education at Simon Fraser University in Vancouver, Canada. In addition to numerous articles based on his research, he is also the coauthor of over 13 books and many book chapters.
