= Canoeing at the 1994 Asian Games =

- Venue: Yachiyo Lake
- Dates: 5–10 October 1994

Canoeing and Kayaking were held at the 1994 Asian Games in Yachiyo Lake, Hiroshima, Japan from October 5 to October 10. Men's and women's competition were held in Kayak and men's competition in Canoe. The competition included only flatwater events.

== Medalists ==
=== Men ===
Event	Gold	Silver	Bronze
C-1 500 m	Konstantin Negodyayev; Kazakhstan	Park Chang-kyu; South Korea	Yevgeny Astanin; Uzbekistan
C-1 1000 m	Yevgeny Astanin; Uzbekistan	Park Chang-kyu; South Korea	Kazuaki Takara; Japan
C-2 500 m	Kazakhstan; Konstantin Negodyayev; Sergey Sergeyev	Uzbekistan; Andrey Gorelov; Vitaly Sorokin	South Korea; Lee Chong-min; Lee Seung-woo
C-2 1000 m	Kazakhstan; Konstantin Negodyayev; Sergey Sergeyev	Uzbekistan; Andrey Gorelov; Vitaly Sorokin	India; Johnny Rommel; Siji Kumar Sadanandan
K-1 500 m	Ivan Kireyev; Uzbekistan	Xu Jiguang; China	Yevgeniy Yegorov; Kazakhstan
K-1 1000 m	Ivan Kireyev; Uzbekistan	Xu Jiguang; China	Yevgeniy Yegorov; Kazakhstan
K-2 500 m	China; Chen Guiqi; Jiang Yuguo	Uzbekistan; Vladimir Kazantsev; Andrey Kolganov	Kazakhstan; Dmitriy Izaak; Sergey Skrypnik
K-2 1000 m	Kazakhstan; Dmitriy Izaak; Sergey Skrypnik	Uzbekistan; Vladimir Kazantsev; Andrey Kolganov	South Korea; Nam Sung-ho; Kim Soo-yul
K-4 500 m	China; Huang Zhendong; Wang Xianjun; Wang Yong; Yang Jun	Uzbekistan; Vladimir Kazantsev; Ivan Kireyev; Andrey Kolganov; Anatoly Tyurin	South Korea; Jung Kwang-soo; Lee Seung-min; Shim Byung-sup; Kang Ki-jin
K-4 1000 m	Uzbekistan; Vladimir Kazantsev; Ivan Kireyev; Andrey Kolganov; Anatoly Tyurin	China; Huang Zhendong; Wang Xianjun; Wang Yong; Yang Jun	South Korea; Jung Kwang-soo; Lee Seung-min; Shim Byung-sup; Kang Ki-jin

=== Women ===
Event	Gold	Silver	Bronze
K-1 500 m	Dong Ying; China	Irina Lyalina; Uzbekistan	Choi Sun-hyung; South Korea
K-2 500 m	China; Gao Beibei; Zhao Xiaoli	Japan; Miyuki Kobayashi; Keiko Muto	Uzbekistan; Irina Juravleva; Inna Isakova
K-4 500 m	China; Hu Dongmei; Wang Mei; Xian Bangdi; Zhang Qin	Uzbekistan; Inna Isakova; Irina Juravleva; Tatiana Levina; Irina Lyalina	Japan; Chieko Akagi; Sayuri Maruyama; Keiko Muto; Asako Watanabe

== Medal table ==
Rank	Nation	Gold	Silver	Bronze	Total
1	China (CHN)	5	3	0	8
2	Uzbekistan (UZB)	4	7	2	13
3	Kazakhstan (KAZ)	4	0	3	7
4	South Korea (KOR)	0	2	5	7
5	Japan (JPN)	0	1	2	3
6	India (IND)	0	0	1	1
Totals (6 entries)		13	13	13	39
