= Matthias Röder =

Medal record

Men's canoe sprint

World Championships
Gold medal – first place	1997 Dartmouth	C-2 1000 m
Bronze medal – third place	1991 Paris	C-1 1000 m
Bronze medal – third place	1993 Copenhagen	C-1 1000 m

Matthias Röder (born 4 February 1972 is a German sprint canoeist who competed in the 1990s. He won three medals at the ICF Canoe Sprint World Championships with a gold (C-2 1000 m: 1997) and two bronzes (C-1 1000 m: 1991, 1993).

Röder also finished fourth in the C-1 1000 m event at the 1992 Summer Olympics in Barcelona.
