= Zsombor Borhi =

Hungarian sprint canoer

Medal record

Men's canoe sprint

World Championships
Gold medal – first place	1994 Mexico City	K-1 500 m

Zsolt Borhi is a Hungarian sprint canoer who competed in the mid-1990s. He won a gold medal in the K-1 500 m event at the 1994 ICF Canoe Sprint World Championships in Mexico City.

== Awards ==
- Hungarian canoer of the Year (2): 1993, 1994
