= Yuriy Kichayev =

Ukrainian canoeist

Medal record

Men's canoe sprint

World Championships
Bronze medal – third place	1994 Mexico City	K-4 200 m

Yuriy Kichayev is a Ukrainian sprint canoer who competed in the mid-1990s. He won a bronze medal in the K-4 200 m event at the 1994 ICF Canoe Sprint World Championships in Mexico City.
