= Fred Spaulding =

American canoeist

Personal information
- Born: August 26, 1965 (age 61) Manchester, Connecticut, United States

Sport
- Sport: Canoeing
Medal record
Representing United States
Pan American Games
| Bronze medal – third place | 1991 Havana | C-1 1000m |

Frederick Churchill "Fred" Spaudling (born August 26, 1965) is an American sprint canoer who competed in the early 1990s. At the 1992 Summer Olympics in Barcelona, he was eliminated in the semifinals of both the C-1 500 m and the C-1 1000 m events.
