= Wang Bing (canoeist) =

Chinese sprint canoeist (born 1978)

Personal information
- Born: 2 January 1978 (age 48)
Medal record
Men's canoe sprint
Representing China
Asian Games
Gold medal – first place	2002 Busan	C-2 500 m
Gold medal – first place	2002 Busan	C-2 1000 m
Silver medal – second place	2006 Doha	C-2 500 m
Asian Championships
Gold medal – first place	2005 Putrajaya	C-4 500 m
Silver medal – second place	2005 Putrajaya	C-4 200 m
Silver medal – second place	2005 Putrajaya	C-4 1000 m
Silver medal – second place	2007 Hwacheon	C-1 1000 m

Wang Bing (Chinese: 王兵; pinyin: Wáng Bīng; born January 2, 1978, in Liaoning) is a Chinese sprint canoeist who competed in the mid-2000s. He finished ninth in the C-1 500 m event at the 2004 Summer Olympics in Athens.

He also participated at the 2002 Asian Games in Busan, South Korea and won two gold medals alongside Yang Wenjun at C2 500 and 1000 metres. Wang later participated with Yang Wenjun at the 2006 Asian Games in Doha and won a silver medal.
