= Jan Bartůněk =

Czech canoeist

Medal record

Men's canoe sprint

World Championships
Silver medal – second place	1990 Poznań	C-1 10000 m
Bronze medal – third place	1989 Plovdiv	C-1 10000 m

Jan Bartůněk (born 13 February 1965 in Čáslav) is a Czech former sprint canoeist who competed for Czechoslovakia in the late 1980s and early 1990s. He won two medals in the C-1 10000 m at the ICF Canoe Sprint World Championships with a silver in 1990 and a bronze in 1989.

Bartůněk also competed at the 1992 Summer Olympics in Barcelona, finishing eighth in both the C-1 1000 m and the C-2 500 m events.
