= Benjamín Castaneda =

Mexican canoeist

Medal record

Men's canoe sprint

World Championships
Bronze medal – third place	1994 Mexico City	C-4 1000 m

Benjamín Castañeda ( ) is a Mexican sprint canoer who competed in the mid-1990s. He won a bronze medal in the C-4 1000 m event at the 1994 ICF Canoe Sprint World Championships in Mexico City.
