= Andrzej Sołoducha =

Polish canoeist (born 1966)

Andrzej Sołoducha (born January 31, 1966, in Olsztyn) is a Polish sprint canoer who competed in the early 1990s. At the 1992 Summer Olympics in Barcelona, he was eliminated in the semifinals of the C-2 500 m event.
