= Stewart Carr =

American sprint canoer (born 1966)

Stewart Carr (born September 11, 1966) is an American sprint canoer who competed in the early 1990s. At the 1992 Summer Olympics in Barcelona, he was eliminated in the semifinals of the C-2 500 m event.
