= Szilvia Mednyánszky =

Hungarian canoeist

Medal record

Women's canoe sprint

World Championships
Gold medal – first place	1994 Mexico City	K-4 200 m
Silver medal – second place	1993 Copenhagen	K-2 500 m
Silver medal – second place	1994 Mexico City	K-2 500 m
Silver medal – second place	1994 Mexico City	K-4 500 m
Bronze medal – third place	1995 Duisburg	K-4 500 m

Szilvia Mednyánszky (born January 2, 1971, in Győr) is a Hungarian sprint canoer who competed in the mid-1990s. She won five medals at the ICF Canoe Sprint World Championships with a gold (K-4 200 m: 1994), three silvers (K-2 500 m: 1993, 1994; K-4 500 m: 1994) and a bronze (K-4 500 m: 1995).

Mednyánsky also competed at the 1996 Summer Olympics in Atlanta, finishing fourth in the K-2 500 m and ninth in the K-4 500 m events.

== Awards ==
- Hungarian kayaker of the Year (1): 1997
