= Marcel Glăvan =

Romanian-born Spanish flatwater canoer (born 1975)

Medal record

Men's canoe sprint

Representing Romania

Olympic Games
Silver medal – second place	1996 Atlanta	C-2 1000 m

World Junior Championships
Gold medal – first place	1993 Racice	C-1 500 m
Silver medal – second place	1993 Racice	C-4 1000 m
Bronze medal – third place	1993 Racice	C-2 500 m

World Championships
Gold medal – first place	1995 Duisburg	C-4 1000 m
Gold medal – first place	1997 Dartmouth	C-4 1000 m
Silver medal – second place	1994 Mexico City	C-4 500 m
Silver medal – second place	1994 Mexico City	C-4 1000 m
Silver medal – second place	1995 Duisburg	C-2 1000 m
Silver medal – second place	1995 Duisburg	C-4 500 m
Silver medal – second place	1997 Dartmouth	C-4 500 m

Marcel Glăvan (born 9 March 1975 in Drăgușeni) is a Romanian-born Spanish flatwater canoer who competed from the mid-1990s to the early 2000s (decade). During the mid-1990s, he won two world championship titles in the C-4 event. He was an Olympic silver medalist at the 1996 Summer Olympics in the C-2 1000 m event with partner Antonel Borșan. He also won a C-4 1000 m gold medal at the 1997 European Championships in Plovdiv, Bulgaria.

Competition for a place in the Romanian national team is famously stiff and after a disappointing seventh place in the C-4 1000 m at the 1998 world championships team leader Ivan Patzaichin dropped various stars, including Glăvan. He thus found himself an ex-international at the age of just 23. In 2000, he took Spanish nationality and represented his adopted country at the 2001 and 2002 world championships, reaching the C-4 1000 m final both times.

He is now a coach for High Performance "Infanta Cristina".
