= Grigore Obreja =

Romanian canoeist

Medal record

Representing Romania

Men's canoe sprint
Bronze medal – third place	1996 Atlanta	C-2 500 m

World Championships
Gold medal – first place	1994 Mexico City	C-2 500 m

Grigore Obreja (November 6, 1967 – June 1, 2016) was a Romanian sprint canoeist who competed from the late 1980s to the late 1990s. Competing in two Summer Olympics, he won a bronze medal in the C-2 500 m event at Atlanta in 1996.

Obreja also won a gold in the C-2 500 m at the 1994 ICF Canoe Sprint World Championships in Mexico City.
