= Konstantin Negodyayev =

Kazakhstani canoeist

Personal information
- Born: December 1, 1967 (age 58) Temirtau
- Height: 196 cm (6 ft 5 in)
- Weight: 95 kg (209 lb)
Medal record
Men's canoe sprint
Representing Kazakhstan
Asian Games
Gold medal – first place	1994 Hiroshima	C-1 500 m
Gold medal – first place	1994 Hiroshima	C-1 1000 m
Gold medal – first place	1994 Hiroshima	C-2 500 m
Gold medal – first place	1998 Bangkok	C-2 500 m
Gold medal – first place	1998 Bangkok	C-2 1000 m

Konstantin Negodyayev (Russian: Константин Негодяев, born December 1, 1967, in Temirtau) is a Kazakhstani sprint canoer who competed from the mid-1990s to the early 2000s (decade). Competing in two Summer Olympics, he earned his best finish of seventh twice (1996: C-1 500 m, 2000: C-1 500 m).
