= Aleski Igraev =

Ukrainian canoeist

Aleksei Igraev (sometimes listed as Oleksiy Ihraiev, born 27 July 1972) is a Ukrainian sprint canoeist who competed in the early to mid-1990s. At the 1992 Summer Olympics in Barcelona, he finished eighth in the C-2 1000 m event for the Unified Team. Four years later in Atlanta, Igraev was eliminated for Ukraine in the semifinals of both the C-2 500 m and the C-2 1000 m events.
