= Nikica Ljubek =

Croatian canoeist

Personal information
- Born: 19 October 1980 (age 45) Osijek, SR Croatia, Yugoslavia
- Height: 185 cm (6 ft 1 in)
Medal record
Men's canoe marathon
World Championships
Silver medal – second place	2008 Týn nad Vltavou	C-1 26 km

Nikica Ljubek (born 19 October 1980) is a Croatian sprint canoer and marathon canoeist who competed in the early 2000s. He was born in Osijek. He was eliminated in the semifinals of both the C-1 1000 m and the C-2 500 m events at the 2000 Summer Olympics in Sydney.

He later competed in canoe marathons, and won silver at the 2008 ICF Canoe Marathon World Championships in the Czech Republic in the C-1 26 km category. In the 2010 World Championship held in Banyoles, Spain, he finished 4th in the same event.

He is the son of Matija Ljubek (1953–2000), a former Olympic and World Champion canoe racer who won four Olympic medals competing for Yugoslavia between 1976 and 1984.
