= Gunar Kirchbach =

German canoeist

Medal record

Men's canoe sprint

Representing Germany

Olympic Games
Gold medal – first place	1996 Atlanta	C-2 1000 m

World Championships
Gold medal – first place	1994 Mexico City	C-2 1000 m
Gold medal – first place	1997 Dartmouth	C-2 1000 m
Bronze medal – third place	1993 Copenhagen	C-2 500 m
Bronze medal – third place	1995 Duisburg	C-2 500 m
Bronze medal – third place	1995 Duisburg	C-2 1000 m

Gunar Kirchbach (born 12 October 1971) is a German sprint canoer who competed in the mid-to-late 1990s. He won a gold medal in the C-2 1000 m event at the 1996 Summer Olympics, together with teammate Andreas Dittmer.

Kirchbach also won five medals at the ICF Canoe Sprint World Championships with two golds (C-2 1000 m: 1994, 1997) and three bronzes (C-2 500 m: 1993, 1995; C-2 1000 m: 1995).
