= Jefimijs Klementjevs =

Latvian spring canoer (born 1963)

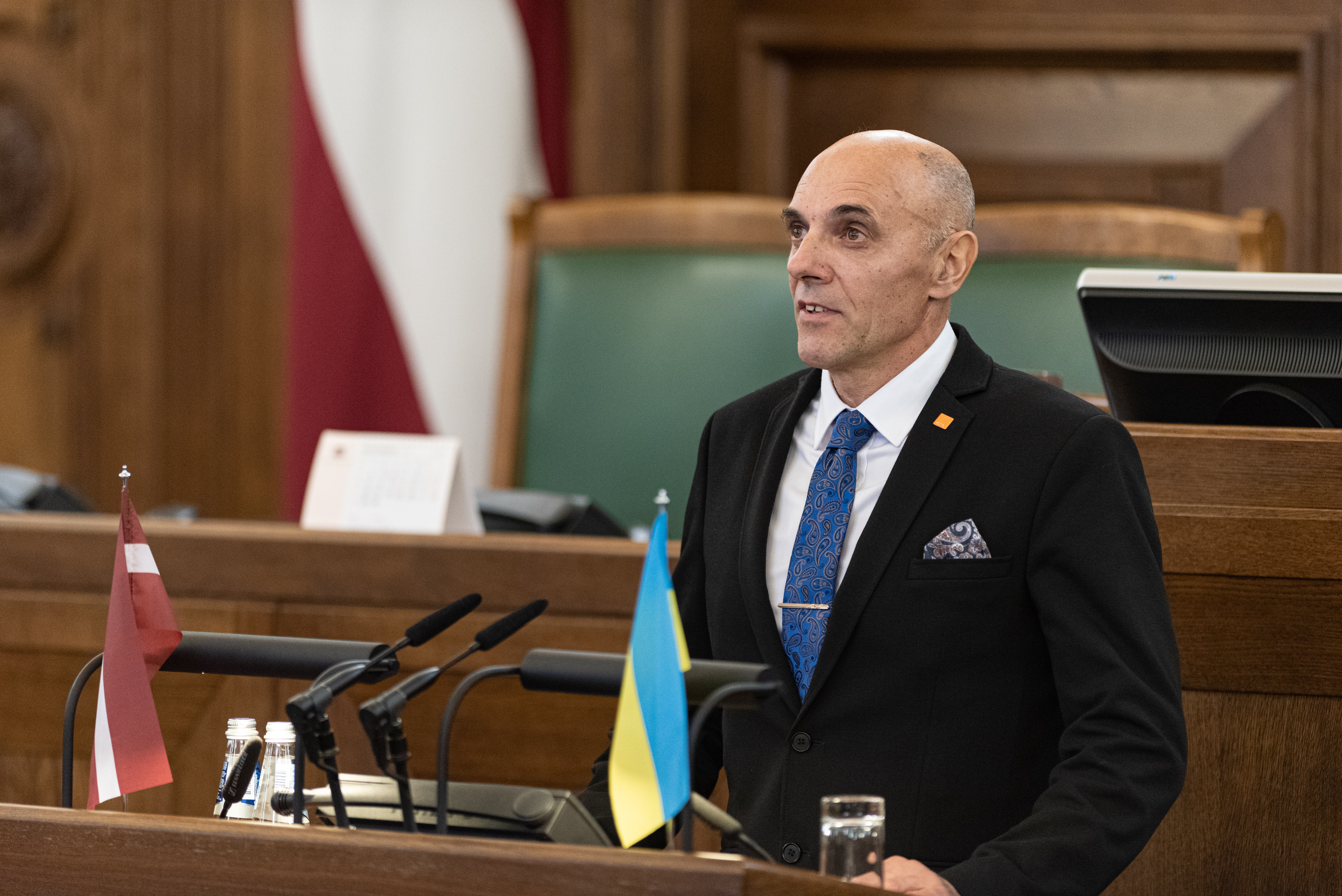

Jefimijs Klementjevs (sometimes listed as Efims Klementjevs, born 17 March 1963) is a Latvian sprint canoer who competed from the early 1990s to the early 2000s. Competing in two Summer Olympics, he earned his best finish of seventh in the C-1 1000 m event at Sydney in 2000. In 2013 he was elected to be 1 of the 60 Riga City Council seat members.
