= Florin Huidu =

Romanian canoeist (born 1976)

Florin Huidu (born 24 April 1976) is a Romanian sprint canoer who competed from the mid-1990s to the early 2000s (decade). At the 1996 Summer Olympics in Atlanta, he was eliminated in the semifinals of the C-1 500 m event. Four years later in Sydney, Huidu was eliminated in the semifinals of both the C-1 500 m and the C-1 1000 m event.
