= Zhomart Satubaldin =

Kazakhstani canoeist

Medal record

Men's canoe sprint

Representing Kazakhstan

World Championships
Bronze medal – third place	2005 Zagreb	C-1 200 m

Asian Championships
Gold medal – first place	2009 Tehran	C-2 200 m
Gold medal – first place	2009 Tehran	C-2 500 m
Bronze medal – third place	2007 Hwacheon	C-1 200 m

Zhomart Satubaldin (born July 11, 1975 in Alma-Ata) is a Kazakhstani sprint canoer who competed in the early to mid-2000s. He won a bronze medal in the C-1 200 m event at the 2005 ICF Canoe Sprint World Championships in Zagreb.

Satubaldin also finished seventh in the C-2 500 m event at the 2000 Summer Olympics in Sydney. He also competed in the C-2 1000 m at those same games, but was eliminated in the semifinal round.
