= Pascal Sylvoz =

French sprint canoer (born 1965)

Medal record

Men's canoe sprint

World Championships
Silver medal – second place	1991 Paris	C-4 500 m
Bronze medal – third place	1989 Plovdiv	C-4 500 m

Pascal Sylvoz (born July 31, 1965) is a French sprint canoer who competed from the late 1980s to the mid-1990s. He won two medals in the C-4 500 m event at the ICF Canoe Sprint World Championships with a silver (1991) and a bronze (1989).

Sylvoz also competed in three Summer Olympics, earning his best finish of fifth in the C-1 1000 m event twice (1992, 1996).
