= Park Chang-kyu =

South Korean canoeist (born 1970)

Personal information
- Born: December 28, 1970 (age 55)
Medal record
Men's canoe sprint
Representing South Korea
Asian Games
Bronze medal – third place	1990 Beijing	C-1 500 m
Silver medal – second place	1994 Hiroshima	C-1 500 m
Silver medal – second place	1994 Hiroshima	C-1 1000 m
Silver medal – second place	1998 Bangkok	C-2 500 m
Silver medal – second place	2002 Busan	C-1 500 m
Bronze medal – third place	2002 Busan	C-2 500 m

Park Chang-Gyu (박창규, born December 28, 1970) is a South Korean sprint canoer who competed in the early to mid-1990s. At the 1992 Summer Olympics in Barcelona, he was eliminated in the semifinals of both the C-1 500 m and the C-1 1000 m events. Four years later in Atlanta, Park was eliminated in the semifinals of both the C-2 500 m and the C-2 1000 m events.
