= Imre Pulai =

Hungarian sprint canoeist (born 1967)

Medal record

Men's canoe sprint

Representing Hungary
Event	1st	2nd	3rd
Olympic Games	1	0	1
World Championships	4	2	2
European Championships	1	0	1
Total	6	2	4

Olympic Games
Gold medal – first place	2000 Sydney	C-2 500 m
Bronze medal – third place	1996 Atlanta	C-1 500 m

World Championships
Gold medal – first place	1993 Copenhagen	C-4 1000 m
Gold medal – first place	1994 Mexico City	C-4 1000 m
Gold medal – first place	1995 Duisburg	C-1 1000 m
Gold medal – first place	2003 Gainesville	C-4 1000 m
Silver medal – second place	1994 Mexico City	C-1 500 m
Silver medal – second place	1999 Milan	C-2 500 m
Bronze medal – third place	1995 Duisburg	C-1 500 m
Bronze medal – third place	2003 Gainesville	C-4 500 m

Imre Pulai (born November 14, 1967, in Budapest) is a Hungarian sprint canoeist, who won two Olympic medals in the Canadian canoeing event, including a gold medal at the 2000 Summer Olympics with teammate Ferenc Novák.

As a twenty-year-old, Pulai reached the C-1 1000 m final at the 1988 Summer Olympics in Seoul, finishing in sixth place. However, it was not until five years later that he won the first of his four world championship gold medals - in the C-4 1000 m in Copenhagen. In 1994, he retained that title and a year later, he was individual world champion, ending Ivans Klementjevs's run of five straight victories in Duisburg. That achievement earned him the title of 1995 Hungarian Sportsman of the Year. At the 1996 Summer Olympics in Atlanta, he won the C-1 500 m bronze medal.

After Atlanta, his career took another dip until he teamed up with Ferenc Novák in the C-2. In 1999, their first season together, the pair were world silver medalists and went on to win the C-2 500 m gold medal at the 2000 Summer Olympics in Sydney. When the two were paired up, they became known as "The Monster and the Little Guy" because of the size differential between them (Pulai was 6 ft 6.5 in (1.994 m) and weighed 214 pounds (97 kg) while Novák was 5 ft 8 in (1.73 m) and weighed 170 pounds (77 kg).).

In 2003 Pulai won his fourth world championship gold in the C-4 1000 m at Gainesville, Georgia, United States and he won also his second bronze medal in the C-4 500 m event. Most assumed that would be the final medal of his long career, but in 2006 he made a comeback at the 2006 European Championships, held in Račice, Czech Republic, winning a C-4 500 m bronze medal. At the age of thirty-eight he was the second-oldest male competitor.

Pulai is nicknamed "Sumák".

In February 2008, Pulai met with the International Luge Federation in Berlin to help promote luge in his native Hungary which Pulai started competing in 2005. At the FIL European Luge Championships 2010 in Sigulda, he finished 34th in the men's singles event.

== Awards ==
- Hungarian canoer of the Year (1): 1994
- Hungarian Sportman of the Year (1) - votes of sports journalists: 1995

Orders and special awards

- Cross of Merit of the Republic of Hungary – Silver Cross (1996)
- Order of Merit of the Republic of Hungary – Officer's Cross (2000)

Awards
Preceded by Norbert Rózsa	Hungarian Sportsman of The Year; 1995	Succeeded by István Kovács
