= Andrei Plăcintă =

Moldovan canoeist

Andrei Plăcintă (born November 7, 1974) is a Moldovan sprint canoer who competed in the mid-1990s. He participated at 1996 Summer Olympics in Atlanta and World Championship.
