= Oleksandr Lytvynenko (canoeist) =

Ukrainian canoeist

Oleksandr Lytvynenko (March 21, 1977 – May 2008) was a Ukrainian sprint canoeist who competed in the mid-1990s. At the 1996 Summer Olympics in Atlanta, he was eliminated in the semifinals of both the C-2 500 m and the C-2 1000 m events.
