= Meng Guanliang =

Chinese canoeist

Personal information
- Native name: 孟关良
- Born: January 24, 1977 (age 49) Dingqiao, Haining, Jiaxing, China
- Education: Wuhan Sports University, Hubei
- Height: 185 cm (6 ft 1 in)
- Weight: 90 kg (198 lb)

Sport
- Country: China
- Sport: male sprint canoeist
- Retired: yes
Medal record
Men's canoe sprint
Representing China
Olympic Games
| Gold medal – first place | 2004 Athens | C-2 500 m |
| Gold medal – first place | 2008 Beijing | C-2 500 m |
Asian Games
| Gold medal – first place | 1998 Bangkok | C-1 1000 m |
| Gold medal – first place | 2002 Busan | C-1 500 m |
| Gold medal – first place | 2002 Busan | C-1 1000 m |
| Bronze medal – third place | 1998 Bangkok | C-2 500 m |
Asian Championships
| Gold medal – first place | 2005 Putrajaya | C-4 500 m |
| Gold medal – first place | 2007 Hwacheon | C-2 500 m |
| Silver medal – second place | 2005 Putrajaya | C-1 200 m |
| Silver medal – second place | 2005 Putrajaya | C-4 200 m |

Meng Guanliang (simplified Chinese: 孟关良; traditional Chinese: 孟關良; pinyin: Mèng Guānliáng, born January 24, 1977, in Shaoxing, Zhejiang) is a Chinese former flatwater canoeist who has competed since 1998. He was the gold medalist at two Olympic Games, winning the C-2 500 m gold medal both in 2004 and 2008.

As a competitive canoeist, Meng once announced his retirement at 2005 China National Games end, he made a comeback in October 2006, Meng officially announced retirement after the 2008 Beijing Olympics.

As Champions in two Olympic Games, Meng won much honour. He was the winners at the Best Group of CCTV Sports Personality Awards of Year 2008, the 2008 China Top Ten Benefiting Laureus Sports for Good, the 2008 most influential people in Zhengjiang. Meng was selected as the representative of 18th CCPC National Congress; he currently serves as the director at Water Sports Administration Center of Zhejiang .

== Career ==
Meng became Chinese champion for the first time at the age of twenty. He has won a total of five gold medals at the Asian Championships (1998, 1999 (x3) and 2002).

His best world championship performance came in 2003 in Gainesville, USA. Meng reached two individual finals, finishing in fifth place in the C-1 500 m and sixth in the C-1 200 m.

For the 2004 season he formed a C-2 partnership with Yang Wenjun. On their first international appearance together in Komatsu, Japan, they shocked observers by posting a C-2 500 m time of 1:40.27. Then, in June, they won a World Cup race in Duisburg to establish themselves as one of the favourites for an Olympic medal.

At the 2004 Summer Olympics in Athens, they were drawn in the toughest heat alongside all the main medal contenders. They won the heat in a time of 1:38.916, almost a full second ahead of Cubans Rojas and Balceiro. The final was much closer with less than a second separating the first eight contenders but Meng and Yang again headed the Cuban pair to win the gold medal - China's first in the sport. They repeated their Olympic victory in Beijing four years later despite their boat capsizing at the finish line after their win.

Meng is 185 centimetres (6 ft 1 in) tall and weighs 90 kilograms (198 lb).
