= Dmitri Dovgalenok =

Soviet-born Belarusian sprint canoeist

Medal record

Men's canoe sprint

Olympic Games

Representing Unified Team
Gold medal – first place	1992 Barcelona	C-2 500 m

Representing Belarus

World Championships
Gold medal – first place	1994 Mexico City	C-2 200 m

Dmitri Alyaksandravich Dovgalenok (sometimes spelled as Dmitry, Belarusian: Дзмітрый Аляксандравіч Даўгалёнак; born 14 December 1971), is a Soviet-born Belarusian sprint canoeist who competed from the early 1990s to the early 2000s (decade). He was born in Minsk. Competing in two Summer Olympics, he won a gold in the C-2 500 m event at Barcelona in 1992 representing the Unified Team.

Dovgalenok also won a gold medal in the C-2 200 m event at the 1994 ICF Canoe Sprint World Championships in Mexico City.
