= Aleksandr Maseikov =

Canoe racer

Medal record

Men's canoe sprint

Representing Unified Team

Olympic Games
| Gold medal – first place | 1992 Barcelona | C-2 500 m |

Representing Belarus

World Championships
| Gold medal – first place | 1994 Mexico City | C-2 200 m |
| Gold medal – first place | 1997 Dartmouth | C-4 200 m |
| Silver medal – second place | 1998 Szeged | C-4 200 m |

Aleksandr Maseikov (Sometimes listed as Aleksandr Maseykov, Belarusian: Аляксандр Анатолевіч Масяйкоў, born July 26, 1971), is a Soviet-born Belarusian sprint canoeist who competed from the early 1990s to the early 2000s. He was born in Mogilev and was affiliated with Dynamo Mogilev. Competing in three Summer Olympics, he won a gold in the C-2 500 m event at Barcelona in 1992 representing the Unified Team.

Maseikov also won three medals at the ICF Canoe Sprint World Championships with two golds (C-2 200 m: 1994, C-4 200 m: 1997) and one silver (C-4 200 m: 1998).
