= Slavomír Kňazovický =

Czechoslovak-Slovak sprint canoer (born 1967)

Medal record

Men's canoe sprint

Olympic Games
Silver medal – second place	1996 Atlanta	C-1 500 m

World Championships
Silver medal – second place	1998 Szeged	C-1 200 m
Bronze medal – third place	1994 Mexico City	C-4 500 m
Bronze medal – third place	1999 Milan	C-1 200 m

European Championships
Gold medal – first place	1997 Plovdiv	C-1 200 m
Bronze medal – third place	1999 Zagreb	C-1 200 m

Slavomír Kňazovický (born 3 May 1967 in Piešťany) is a Slovak sprint canoer who competed from the early 1990s to the early 2000s (decade). Competing in three Summer Olympics, he won a silver in the C-1 500 m event at Atlanta in 1996.

An out-and-out sprinter, his preferred distance was in fact the 200 m (not included on the Olympic schedule). In 1997 he became European C-1 200 m champion in Plovdiv, Bulgaria. The following year he won the silver medal in Szeged, Hungary. In 1999 he was a bronze medallist at both the World and European Championships. Kňazovický also earned a bronze in the C-4 500 m event at the 1994 World championships in Mexico City.

Kňazovický is now the coach of the Slovak canoer Marián Ostrčil.
