= Peter Páleš =

Czechoslovak-Slovak sprint canoeist (born 1967)

Medal record

Men's canoe sprint

World Championships
Bronze medal – third place	1994 Mexico City	C-4 500 m

Peter Páleš (born 7 June 1967) is a Czechoslovak-Slovak sprint canoeist who competed from the late 1980s to the mid-2000s (decade). He won a bronze medal in the C-4 500 m event at the 1994 ICF Canoe Sprint World Championships in Mexico City.

Páleš also competed in four Summer Olympics, earning his best finish of seventh twice (1988: C-1 1000 m for Czechoslovakia, 1996: C-2 1000 m for Slovakia).
