= Victor Partnoi =

Romanian canoeist

Medal record

Men's canoe sprint

World Championships
Silver medal – second place	1993 Copenhagen	C-1 1000 m
Bronze medal – third place	1994 Mexico City	C-1 1000 m

Victor Partnoi (born November 27, 1970) is a Romanian sprint canoer who competed in the 1990s. He won two medals at the ICF Canoe Sprint World Championships in the C-1 1000 m event with a silver in 1993 and a bronze in 1994.

Partnoi also competed in two Summer Olympics, earning his best finish of sixth in the C-1 1000 m event at Atlanta in 1996.
