= Siji Kumar Sadanandan =

Indian canoeist (born 1974)

Personal information
- Born: 23 May 1974 (age 52)
Medal record
Men's canoe sprint
Representing India
Asian Games
Bronze medal – third place	1994 Hiroshima	C-2 1000 m

Siji Kumar Sadanandan (born 23 May 1974) is an Indian canoeing athlete who had won the bronze medal in men's C-2 1000M in 1994 Asian Games.
