= Jun Kwang-rak =

South Korean canoeist

Personal information
- Born: September 16, 1971 (age 54)
- Height: 179 cm (5 ft 10 in)
- Weight: 72 kg (159 lb)
Medal record
Men's canoe sprint
Representing South Korea
Asian Games
Silver medal – second place	1998 Bangkok	C-2 500 m
Bronze medal – third place	2002 Busan	C-2 500 m

Jun Kwang-Rak (전광락, born September 16, 1971) is a South Korean sprint canoer who competed in the mid-1990s. At the 1996 Summer Olympics in Atlanta, he was eliminated in the semifinals of both the C-2 500 m and the C-2 1000 m events.
