= Andrew Train =

British canoeist

Andrew Train MBE
Personal information
- Full name: Andrew John Train
- Born: 21 September 1963 (age 63) Pelsall, West Midlands, England

Sport
- Sport: Canoe sprint, Canoe marathon
- Club: Fladbury Canoe & Kayak Club
Medal record
Representing Great Britain
Men's canoe sprint
World Championships
Silver medal – second place	1985 Mechelen	C-2 10000 m
Silver medal – second place	1993 Copenhagen	C-2 10000 m
Bronze medal – third place	1987 Duisburg	C-2 10000 m
Bronze medal – third place	1991 Paris	C-1 10000 m
Bronze medal – third place	1991 Paris	C-2 10000 m
Bronze medal – third place	1997 Dartmouth	C-2 1000 m
Men's canoe marathon
World Championships
Gold medal – first place	1988 Nottingham	C-2 marathon
Gold medal – first place	1996 Vaxholm	C-2 marathon
Gold medal – first place	1998 Cape Town	C-2 marathon
Silver medal – second place	1994 Bosbaan	C-2 marathon

Andrew John Train MBE (born 21 September 1963) is a British sprint canoeist and marathon canoeist who competed from the mid-1980s to the early 2000s (decade). He won seven medals at the ICF Canoe Sprint World Championships with two silvers (C-2 10000 m: 1985, 1995), and five bronzes (C-2 1000 m: 1997, C-1 10000 m: 1991, C-2 10000 m: 1987, 1989, 1991).

== Career ==
Between 1984 and 2000, Train competed in five Summer Olympic Games, earning his best finish of sixth twice (C-1 1000 m: 1992, C-2 1000 m: 1996).

Train has also won three ICF Canoe Marathon World Championships, in 1988, 1996 and 1998, competing in C-2 with his brother Stephen Train.
