= Sergey Shayslamov =

Uzbekistani canoeist (born 1970)

Sergey Shayslamov (born 23 July 1970) is an Uzbekistani sprint canoer who competed in the mid-1990s. At the 1996 Summer Olympics in Atlanta, paired with his twin brother Vladimir Shayslamov, he was eliminated in the repechages of the C-2 500 m event and the semifinals of the C-2 1000 m event.
