= Stephen Train =

British canoeist

Steve Train
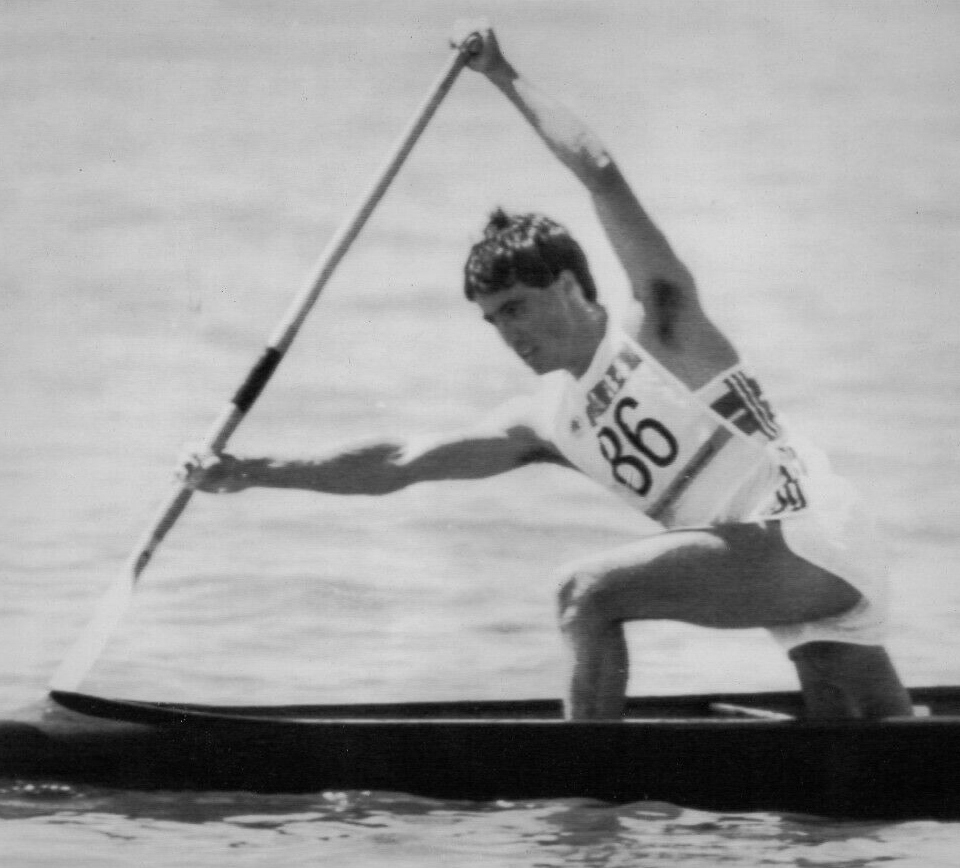
- Train at the 1984 Olympics

Personal information
- Full name: Stephen David Train
- Born: 23 February 1962 (age 64) Sunderland, Tyne and Wear, England
- Height: 173 cm (5 ft 8 in)
- Weight: 80 kg (176 lb)

Sport
- Sport: Canoe sprint, Canoe marathon
- Club: Fladbury Canoe & Kayak Club
Medal record
Representing Great Britain
Men's canoe sprint
World Championships
Silver medal – second place	1985 Mechelen	C-2 10000 m
Silver medal – second place	1993 Copenhagen	C-2 10000 m
Bronze medal – third place	1987 Duisburg	C-2 10000 m
Bronze medal – third place	1989 Plovdiv	C-2 10000 m
Bronze medal – third place	1991 Paris	C-2 10000 m
Bronze medal – third place	1997 Dartmouth	C-2 1000 m
Men's canoe marathon
World Championships
Gold medal – first place	1988 Nottingham	C-2 marathon
Gold medal – first place	1996 Vaxholm	C-2 marathon
Gold medal – first place	1998 Cape Town	C-2 marathon
Silver medal – second place	1994 Bosbaan	C-2 marathon

Stephen David "Steve" Train (born 23 February 1962) is a British canoe sprinter and marathon canoeist who competed from the mid-1980s to the early 2000s (decade). He won six medals at the ICF Canoe Sprint World Championships with two silvers (C-2 10000 m: 1985, 1995), and four bronzes (C-2 1000 m: 1997, C-2 10000 m: 1987, 1989, 1991).

== Career ==
Between 1984 and 2000, Train competed in five Summer Olympics, earning his best finish of sixth twice (C-1 1000 m in 1984 and C-2 1000 m in 1996).

Train has also won three ICF Canoe Marathon World Championships, in 1988, 1996 and 1998, competing in C-2 with his brother Andrew Train.
