= Éric le Leuch =

French canoeist

Medal record

Men's canoe sprint

Representing France

World Championships
Bronze medal – third place	1995 Duisburg	C-4 200 m

Éric le Leuch (born June 19, 1971) is a French sprint canoer who competed from 1995 to 2000. He won a bronze medal in the C-4 200 m event at the 1995 ICF Canoe Sprint World Championships in Duisburg.

Eric Le Leuch also competed in two Summer Olympics, earning his best finish of fourth in the C-1 1000 m event at Sydney in 2000.
