= Martin Doktor =

Czech canoeist (born 1974)

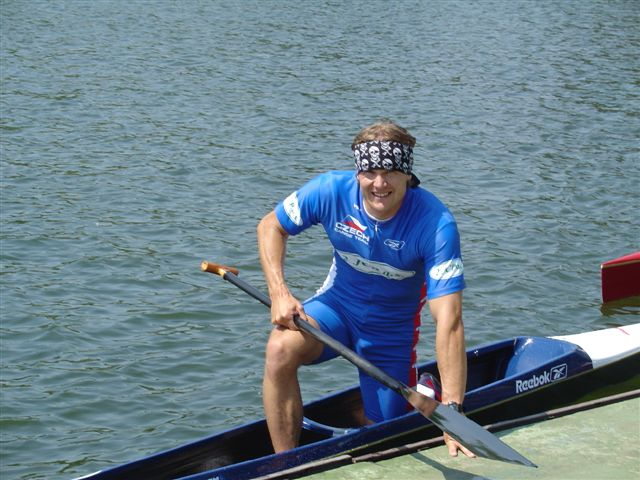
- Martin Doktor in 2005

Medal record

Men's canoe sprint

Olympic Games
Gold medal – first place	1996 Atlanta	C-1 500 m
Gold medal – first place	1996 Atlanta	C-1 1000 m

World Championships
Gold medal – first place	1997 Dartmouth	C-1 500 m
Gold medal – first place	1998 Szeged	C-1 200 m
Silver medal – second place	1995 Dusiburg	C-1 500 m
Silver medal – second place	1995 Dusiburg	C-1 1000 m
Silver medal – second place	1997 Dartmouth	C-1 200 m
Silver medal – second place	1997 Dartmouth	C-1 1000 m
Silver medal – second place	1998 Szeged	C-1 1000 m
Silver medal – second place	1999 Milan	C-1 200 m
Silver medal – second place	1999 Milan	C-1 500 m
Silver medal – second place	2001 Poznań	C-1 1000 m
Silver medal – second place	2003 Gainesville	C-1 200 m
Bronze medal – third place	1998 Szeged	C-4 1000 m
Bronze medal – third place	1999 Milan	C-1 1000 m
Bronze medal – third place	2003 Gainesville	C-1 500 m

Martin Doktor (Czech pronunciation: [ˈmarcɪn ˈdoktor]; born 21 May 1974 in Polička, Czechoslovakia) is the Czech Republic's best-known sprint canoeist. He was double Olympic champion in the Canadian canoe C-1 discipline at the 1996 Summer Olympics in Atlanta. During the 1996 games, his mother cooked knedliky (Dumplings in Czech), using dozens of kg of flour brought over from the Czech Republic.

Doktor went on to win 14 medals at the ICF Canoe Sprint World Championships, including two golds (C-1 200 m: 1998, C-1 500 m: 1997), nine silvers (C-1 200 m: 1997, 1999, 2003; C-1 500 m: 1995, 1999; C-1 1000 m: 1995, 1997, 1998, 2001), and three bronzes (C-1 500 m: 2003, C-1 1000 m: 1999, C-4 1000 m: 1998). He was also European C-1 1000 m champion in 1997 and 2000.

At the 2004 Summer Olympics Doktor was unfortunate not to add to his medal tally, coming in fourth in the C-1 1000 m final and fifth in the C-1 500 m.

His most recent medal success came at the 2006 European Championships, held in Račice, Czech Republic, where he won the C-1 200 m silver medal.

Doktor, nicknamed Boban, remains one of canoeing's most consistent performers. At the 2006 ICF Canoe Sprint World Championships he entered all three C-1 events, reaching the final in each. He finished fourth in the 200 m, fifth in the 500 m, and eighth in the 1000 m.

He is 178 cm (5 ft 10 in) tall and weighs 78 kg (172 lb).

== Decorations ==
Awarded by Czech Republic

- Medal of Merit (2024)

Awards
Preceded by Jan Železný	Czech Athlete of the Year; 1996	Succeeded by Tomáš Dvořák
