= Nikolay Bukhalov =

Bulgarian canoeist (born 1967)

Medal record

Men's canoe sprint

Representing Bulgaria

Olympic Games
Gold medal – first place	1992 Barcelona	C-1 500 m
Gold medal – first place	1992 Barcelona	C-1 1000 m
Bronze medal – third place	1988 Seoul	C-1 1000 m

World Championships
Gold medal – first place	1993 Copenhagen	C-1 500 m
Gold medal – first place	1994 Mexico City	C-1 200 m
Gold medal – first place	1994 Mexico City	C-1 500 m
Gold medal – first place	1995 Duisburg	C-1 200 m
Gold medal – first place	1995 Duisburg	C-1 500 m
Silver medal – second place	1991 Paris	C-1 500 m
Silver medal – second place	1991 Paris	C-1 1000 m
Silver medal – second place	1994 Mexico City	C-1 1000 m
Bronze medal – third place	1986 Montreal	C-1 500 m
Bronze medal – third place	1989 Plovdiv	C-4 1000 m
Bronze medal – third place	1990 Poznań	C-4 500 m
Bronze medal – third place	1990 Poznań	C-4 1000 m
Bronze medal – third place	1991 Paris	C-4 1000 m

Nikolay Petkov Bukhalov (Bulgarian: Николай Петков Бухалов, born 20 March 1967 in Karlovo) is Bulgaria's most successful ever sprint canoeist. He competed mostly in the Canadian canoe C-1 event though he did win world championship medals in the C-4 events.

Competing in four Summer Olympics, he won three medals, including double gold at Barcelona in 1992. In addition, he won thirteen medals at the ICF Canoe Sprint World Championships with five golds (C-1 200 m: 1994, 1995; C-1 500 m: 1993, 1994, 1995), three silvers (C-1 500 m: 1991, C-1 1000 m: 1991, 1994), and five bronzes (C-1 500 m: 1986, C-4 500 m: 1990, C-4 1000 m: 1989, 1990, 1991).

The final gold medal of his career came at the 1997 European Championships, held on his home course in Plovdiv, where he won the C-1 500 m title.

Bukhalov was a member of the Trakia club in Plovdiv and was coached by Georgi Uchkunov. He is 187 cm (6 ft 2 in) tall and raced at 83 kg (183 lb).
