= Blagovest Stoyanov =

Bulgarian canoeist

Medal record

Men's canoe sprint

Olympic Games
Bronze medal – third place	1992 Barcelona	C-2 500 m

World Championships
Bronze medal – third place	1994 Mexico City	C-2 500 m
Bronze medal – third place	1995 Duisburg	C-2 200 m

Blagovest Stoyanov (Bulgarian: Благовест Стоянов, born March 21, 1968, in Asenovgrad) is a Bulgarian sprint canoer who competed in the 1990s. Competing in two Summer Olympics, he won a bronze in the C-2 500 m event at Barcelona in 1992.

Stoyanov's best world championship results also came in the C-2 with Marinov. At the 1994 championships in Mexico City, they won the C-2 500 m bronze medal. The following year, in Duisburg, they were again bronze medalists, this time in the C-2 200 m event.
