= Yang Wenjun =

Chinese canoeist

Personal information
- Native name: 杨文军
- Nationality: Chinese
- Born: 25 December 1983 (age 42) Rongtang, Fengcheng, Jiangxi
- Education: Jiangxi Normal University
- Height: 1.78 m (5 ft 10 in)
- Weight: 78 kg (172 lb)

Sport
- Country: China
- Sport: male sprint canoeist
- Retired: 2013
Medal record
Men's canoe sprint
Representing China
Olympic Games
Gold medal – first place	2004 Athens	C-2 500 m
Gold medal – first place	2008 Beijing	C-2 500 m
World Championships
Bronze medal – third place	2006 Szeged	C-1 500 m
Bronze medal – third place	2007 Duisburg	C-1 500 m
Asian Championships
Gold medal – first place	2007 Hwacheon	C-1 200 m

Yang Wenjun (simplified Chinese: 杨文军; traditional Chinese: 楊文軍; pinyin: Yáng Wénjūn, born December 25, 1983, in Fengcheng, Jiangxi) is a Chinese former flatwater canoeist who has competed since the early 2000s, winning gold medals in the canoe double (C2) 500 m event at both the 2004 and 2008 Olympic Games.

As an Olympian and a competitive canoeist with a master's degree from Jiangxi Normal University, Yang officially announced his retirement at the conclusion of the 2009 National Games, making a short time comeback for competing in the 13th National Games in 2013. He won many medals in major international and domestic competitions, including three gold medals and a silver in two Asian Games; he participated in four National Games from 2001 to 2013, won four gold medalists in later three National Games.

As Champions in two Olympic Games, Yang won much honour. He was the winner at the Best Group of CCTV Sports Personality Awards of Year 2008, the winner of the 2008 China Top Ten Benefiting Laureus Sports for Good. he also won the honor at the 2004 Top 10 Outstanding Youths of Jiangxi, the 2008 Top 10 Yichun People, the 2008 People Who Moved Fengcheng. Yang was selected the representative of 17th CCPC National Congress, he currently serves as the vice director, and a coach in Jiangxi Water Sports Administration Center on October 8, 2008, also the secretary of communist party committee.

== Career ==
Yang's first major international success came at the 2002 Asian Games where, aged only 18, he won two gold C-2 medals with Wang Bing. At the 2003 world championships in Gainesville, USA he was the youngest of the individual C-1 1000m finalists, finishing a very creditable seventh overall.

At the start of the 2004 season he formed a new C-2 partnership with the more experienced Meng, working under Canadian coach Marek Ploch. On their first international appearance together in Komatsu, Japan, they shocked observers by posting a 500 m time of 1:40.27. Then, in June, they won the prestigious Duisburg World Cup.

At the Olympic Games in Athens, they were drawn in the toughest heat alongside all the main medal contenders. They won the heat in a time of 1:38.916, almost a full second ahead of Cubans Rojas and Ledys Balceiro. The final was much closer with less than a second separating the first eight contenders but Meng and Yang again came out on top, beating the Cuban pair to win the gold medal.

After the Olympics, Yang returned to the C-1. At the 2005 World Championships in Zagreb, Croatia he raced over all three distances, despite the new compressed schedule, and finished sixth (500 m), seventh (1000 m) and tenth (200 m).

At the 2006 World Championships in Szeged, Hungary, Yang concentrated on the shorter distance events. He won the C-1 500 m bronze medal, China's first-ever men's world championship medal, and finished fifth in the C-1 200 m. Yang won another bronze in the C-1 500 m event at the following world championships in Duisburg.

Meng and Yang defended their Olympic title four years later despite their boat capsizing at the finish line after their win.

Yang is 177 cm (5 ft 10 in) tall and weighs 77 kg (170 lb).
