= Stephen Giles =

Canadian sprint canoeist

Personal information
- Born: July 4, 1972 (age 53) St. Stephen, New Brunswick, Canada

Sport
- Sport: Canoeing
Medal record
Men's canoe sprint
Representing Canada
Olympic Games
Bronze medal – third place	2000 Sydney	C-1 1000 m
World Championships
Gold medal – first place	1998 Szeged	C-1 1000 m
Bronze medal – third place	1993 Copenhagen	C-1 500 m
Bronze medal – third place	2002 Seville	C-1 1000 m

Stephen Giles (born July 4, 1972) is a Canadian sprint canoeist who competed from the early 1990s to the mid 2000s. Competing in four Summer Olympics, he won the bronze in the C-1 1000 m event at Sydney in 2000.

== Life ==
Giles was born in St. Stephen, New Brunswick. He began canoeing at age eight at the Orenda Racing Canoe Club in Lake Echo, Nova Scotia. He was a member of the Canadian national team for fifteen years, including eleven senior world championships. He was inducted into the Nova Scotia Sport Hall of Fame in 2012.

He was adept at both the 500 m event and 1000 m early in his career. His best races came in the C-1 1000 m event later in his career, earning the world championship gold medal in 1998 at Szeged, Hungary. In the same event, he won a bronze medal at the 2000 Summer Olympics, and a bronze medal at the 2002 World Championships in Seville, Spain. He also won a bronze medal at the 1993 world championships in Copenhagen, Denmark, in the men's C-1 500 m event, and at the 1989 Junior World Championships in Dartmouth, Nova Scotia. Notable contemporaries in the C-1 included Andreas Dittmer, Martin Doktor, and Maxim Opalev.

Giles is part of a long line of successful Canadian paddlers in the C-1 discipline including Frank Amyot, John Wood, and Larry Cain. Since Giles' retirement in 2004, the tradition has been taken up by fellow Nova Scotian Richard Dalton, Thomas Hall, and Mark Oldershaw.

Giles holds Bachelor of Science and Bachelor of Engineering degrees from Dalhousie University, as well as an honorary Doctor of Laws. He completed his Master of Business Administration degree at Saint Mary's University in 2011. He currently works at EastLink in Halifax, Nova Scotia. He was married in 1997. He and wife Angela (née Julien) have a daughter, Macy, and a son, Duncan.

In 2018 he was named one of the greatest 15 athletes in Nova Scotia's history.

== 2004 Olympics ==
In the 2004 Summer Olympics, Giles competed in the C-1 1000 m event. He finished second in his initial heat, advancing to the semifinal with a time of 3:52.451. Giles won his semifinal with a time of 3:51.720, qualifying for the final. There, he placed fifth at 3:51.457.

== 2009 ICF Canoe Sprint World Championships ==
For the 2009 ICF Canoe Sprint World Championships in neighboring Dartmouth, Giles served as Chair of Competition.
