= List of ICF Canoe Sprint World Championships medalists in men's Canadian =

This is a list of medallists from the ICF Canoe Sprint World Championships in men's Canadian.

== C-1 200 m ==
Debuted: 1994.

Games	Gold	Silver	Bronze
1994 Mexico City	Nikolay Bukhalov (BUL)	Ervin Hoffmann (HUN)	Michał Śliwiński (UKR)
1995 Duisburg	Nikolay Bukhalov (BUL)	Thomas Zereske (GER)	Michał Śliwiński (UKR)
1997 Dartmouth	Béla Belicza (HUN)	Martin Doktor (CZE)	Michał Śliwiński (UKR)
1998 Szeged	Martin Doktor (CZE)	Slavomír Kňazovický (SVK)	Michał Śliwiński (UKR)
1999 Milan	Maksim Opalev (RUS)	Martin Doktor (CZE)	Slavomír Kňazovický (SVK)
2001 Poznań	Dmitriy Sabin (UKR)	Maksim Opalev (RUS)	Michał Śliwiński (POL)
2002 Seville	Maksim Opalev (RUS)	Andrzej Jezierski (POL)	Christian Gille (GER)
2003 Gainesville	Maksim Opalev (RUS)	Martin Doktor (CZE)	Andreas Dittmer (GER)
2005 Zagreb	Valentyn Demyanenko (UKR)	Maksim Opalev (RUS)	Zhomart Satubaldin (KAZ)
2006 Szeged	Nikolay Lipkin (RUS)	Valentyn Demyanenko (UKR)	Jevgenij Shuklin (LTU)
2007 Duisburg	Yuriy Cheban (UKR)	Maksim Opalev (RUS)	Jevgenij Shuklin (LTU)
2009 Dartmouth	Valentyn Demyanenko (AZE)	Nikolay Lipkin (RUS)	Jevgenij Shuklin (LTU)
2010 Poznań	Ivan Shtyl (RUS)	Thomas Simart (FRA)	Yuriy Cheban (UKR); Richard Dalton (CAN)
2011 Szeged	Valentin Demyanenko (AZE)	Ivan Shtyl (RUS)	Alfonso Benavides (ESP)
2013 Duisburg	Valentin Demyanenko (AZE)	Ivan Shtyl (RUS)	Alfonso Benavides (ESP)
2014 Moscow	Yuriy Cheban (UKR)	Martin Fuksa (CZE)	Attila Vajda (HUN)
2015 Milan	Artsem Kozyr (BLR)	Li Qiang (CHN)	Isaquias Queiroz (BRA)
2017 Račice	Artsem Kozyr (BLR)	Zaza Nadiradze (GEO)	Adel Mojallali (IRI)
2018 Montemor-o-Velho	Artsem Kozyr (BLR)	Ivan Shtyl (RUS)	Henrikas Žustautas (LTU)
2019 Szeged	Henrikas Žustautas (LTU)	Artsem Kozyr (BLR)	Zaza Nadiradze (GEO)
2022 Dartmouth	Oleksii Koliadych (POL)	Nico Pickert (GER)	Viktor Stepanov (KAZ)
2023 Duisburg	Artur Guliev (UZB)	Joan Antoni Moreno (ESP)	Oleksii Koliadych (POL)
2024 Samarkand	Oleksii Koliadych (POL)	Pablo Graña (ESP)	Zaza Nadiradze (GEO)
2025 Milan	Artur Guliev (UZB)	Pablo Graña (ESP)	Sergey Svinarev (AIN)
2026 Poznán	Oleksii Koliadych (POL)	Artur Guliev (UZB)	Andrei Zholabau (AIN-B)

Dmitriy Sabin of Ukraine won silver in this event at the 2002 championships, but was disqualified for doping.

== C-1 500 m ==
Debuted: 1971.

Games	Gold	Silver	Bronze
1971 Belgrade	Detlef Lewe (GER)	Tamás Wichmann (HUN)	Ivan Patzaichin (ROU)
1973 Tampere	Miklós Darvas (HUN)	Nikolay Fedulov (URS)	Ivan Patzaichin (ROU)
1974 Mexico City	Sergey Petrenko (URS)	Klaus Zeisler (GDR)	Ivan Patzaichin (ROU)
1975 Belgrade	Sergey Petrenko (URS)	Miklós Darvas (HUN)	Borislav Ananiev (BUL)
1977 Sofia	Lipat Varabiev (ROU)	Ulrich Eicke (GER)	Zdislav Soroko (URS)
1978 Belgrade	Liubomir Ljubenov (BUL)	Gyula Hajdu (HUN)	Sergey Liminovich (URS)
1979 Duisburg	Sergey Postrechin (URS)	Ulrich Eicke (GER)	Liubomir Ljubenov (BUL)
1981 Nottingham	Olaf Heukrodt (GDR)	Gennadiy Liseichikov (URS)	János Sarusi Kis (HUN)
1982 Belgrade	Olaf Heukrodt (GDR)	János Sarusi Kis (HUN)	Sergey Postrechin (URS)
1983 Tampere	Costică Olaru (ROU)	Ulrich Papke (GDR)	Anatoliy Volkov (URS)
1985 Mechelen	Olaf Heukrodt (GDR)	Anatoliy Volkov (URS)	Aurel Macarencu (ROU)
1986 Montreal	Olaf Heukrodt (GDR)	Aurel Macarencu (ROU)	Nikolay Bukhalov (BUL)
1987 Duisburg	Olaf Heukrodt (GDR)	Petr Procházka (TCH)	Attila Szabó (HUN)
1989 Plovdiv	Michał Śliwiński (URS)	Olaf Heukrodt (GDR)	Martin Marinov (BUL)
1990 Poznań	Michał Śliwiński (URS)	Thomas Zereske (GDR)	Martin Marinov (BUL)
1991 Paris	Michał Śliwiński (URS)	Nikolay Bukhalov (BUL)	Olaf Heukrodt (GER)
1993 Copenhagen	Nikolay Bukhalov (BUL)	György Kolonics (HUN)	Steve Giles (CAN)
1994 Mexico City	Nikolay Bukhalov (BUL)	Imre Pulai (HUN)	Michał Śliwiński (UKR)
1995 Duisburg	Nikolay Bukhalov (BUL)	Martin Doktor (CZE)	Imre Pulai (HUN)
1997 Dartmouth	Martin Doktor (CZE)	Béla Belicza (HUN)	Michał Śliwiński (UKR)
1998 Szeged	Maksim Opalev (RUS)	Andreas Dittmer (GER)	Michał Śliwiński (UKR)
1999 Milan	Maksim Opalev (RUS)	Martin Doktor (CZE)	Andreas Dittmer (GER)
2001 Poznań	Maksim Opalev (RUS)	György Kolonics (HUN)	Andreas Dittmer (GER)
2002 Seville	Maksim Opalev (RUS)	György Kolonics (HUN)	Andreas Dittmer (GER)
2003 Gainesville	Andreas Dittmer (GER)	Maksim Opalev (RUS)	Martin Doktor (CZE)
2005 Zagreb	Andreas Dittmer (GER)	Paweł Baraszkiewicz (POL)	Maksim Opalev (RUS)
2006 Szeged	Maksim Opalev (RUS)	Yuriy Cheban (UKR)	Yang Wenjun (CHN)
2007 Duisburg	David Cal (ESP)	Andreas Dittmer (GER)	Yang Wenjun (CHN)
2009 Dartmouth	Dzianis Harazha (BLR)	Nikolay Lipkin (RUS)	Mathieu Goubel (FRA)
2010 Poznań	Dzianis Harazha (BLR)	Li Qiang (CHN)	Vadim Menkov (UZB)
2011 Szeged	Vladimir Fedosenko (RUS)	Dzianis Harazha (BLR)	Oleksandr Maksymchuk (UKR)
2013 Duisburg	Isaquias Queiroz (BRA)	Vadim Menkov (UZB)	Erik Leue (GER)
2014 Moscow	Isaquias Queiroz (BRA)	Sebastian Brendel (GER)	Martin Fuksa (CZE)
2015 Milan	Martin Fuksa (CZE)	Oleg Tarnovschi (MDA)	Maksim Piatrou (BLR)
2017 Račice	Martin Fuksa (CZE)	Carlo Tacchini (ITA)	Maksim Piatrou (BLR)
2018 Montemor-o-Velho	Isaquias Queiroz (BRA)	Sebastian Brendel (GER)	Martin Fuksa (CZE)
2019 Szeged	Sebastian Brendel (GER)	Angel Kodinov (BUL)	Oleg Tarnovschi (MDA)
2021 Copenhagen	Conrad-Robin Scheibner (GER)	Martin Fuksa (CZE)	Oleg Tarnovschi (MDA); Carlo Tacchini (ITA)
2022 Dartmouth	Isaquias Queiroz (BRA)	Cătălin Chirilă (ROU)	Martin Fuksa (CZE)
2023 Duisburg	Cătălin Chirilă (ROU)	Conrad-Robin Scheibner (GER)	Serghei Tarnovschi (MDA)
2024 Samarkand	Serghei Tarnovschi (MDA)	Martin Fuksa (CZE)	Cătălin Chirilă (ROU)
2025 Milan	Zakhar Petrov (AIN)	Martin Fuksa (CZE)	Serghei Tarnovschi (MDA)
2026 Poznán	Isaquias Queiroz (BRA)	Martin Fuksa (CZE)	Ji Bowen (CHN)

== C-1 1000 m ==
Debuted: 1938. Not held: 1948. Resumed: 1950.

Games	Gold	Silver	Bronze
1938 Vaxholm	Otto Neumüller (AUT)	Hans Wiedemann (GER)	Bohumil Sládek (TCH)
1950 Copenhagen	Josef Holeček (TCH)	Robert Boutigny (FRA)	Bengt Backlund (SWE)
1954 Mâcon	János Parti (HUN)	István Hernek (HUN)	Jaroslav Poupa (TCH)
1958 Prague	Gennady Bukharin (URS)	Jiří Vokněr (TCH)	Yuriy Vinogradov (URS)
1963 Jajce	Simion Ismailcuic (ROU)	Detlef Lewe (GER)	Albrecht Müller (GDR)
1966 East Berlin	Detlef Lewe (GER)	Tamás Wichmann (HUN)	Anatoly Martinov (URS)
1970 Copenhagen	Tibor Tatai (HUN)	Jerzy Opara (POL)	Jiří Čtvrtečka (TCH)
1971 Belgrade	Detlef Lewe (GER)	Tibor Tatai (HUN)	Vladas Česiūnas (URS)
1973 Tampere	Ivan Patzaichin (ROU)	Romualdas Vinojinidis (URS)	Tamás Wichmann (HUN)
1974 Mexico City	Vasiliy Yurchenko (URS)	Klaus Zeisler (GDR)	Ivan Patzaichin (ROU)
1975 Belgrade	Vasiliy Yurchenko (URS)	Ivan Patzaichin (ROU)	Tamás Wichmann (HUN)
1977 Sofia	Ivan Patzaichin (ROU)	Sergey Antipov (URS)	Tamás Buday (HUN)
1978 Belgrade	Matija Ljubek (YUG)	Tamás Wichmann (HUN)	Ivan Patzaichin (ROU)
1979 Duisburg	Tamás Wichmann (HUN)	Liubomir Ljubenov (BUL)	Ivan Patzaichin (ROU)
1981 Nottingham	Ulrich Papke (GDR)	Tamás Buday (HUN)	Jiří Vrdlovec (TCH)
1982 Belgrade	Jörg Schmidt (GDR)	Dezső Csépai (HUN)	Vassiliy Beresa (URS)
1983 Tampere	Vassiliy Beresa (URS)	Costică Olaru (ROU)	Jiří Vrdlovec (TCH)
1985 Mechelen	Ivan Klementiev (URS)	Ulrich Eicke (FRG)	Aurel Macarencu (ROU)
1986 Montreal	Aurel Macarencu (ROU)	Ivan Klementiev (URS)	Ivan Šabjan (YUG)
1987 Duisburg	Olaf Heukrodt (GDR)	Martin Marinov (BUL)	Ivan Klementiev (URS)
1989 Plovdiv	Ivan Klementiev (URS)	Larry Cain (CAN)	Gáspár Boldizsár (HUN)
1990 Poznań	Ivan Klementiev (URS)	György Zala (HUN)	Thomas Zereske (GDR)
1991 Paris	Ivan Klementiev (URS)	Nikolay Bukhalov (BUL)	Matthias Röder (GER)
1993 Copenhagen	Ivan Klementiev (LAT)	Victor Partnoi (ROU)	Matthias Röder (GER)
1994 Mexico City	Ivan Klementiev (LAT)	Nikolay Bukhalov (BUL)	Victor Partnoi (ROU)
1995 Duisburg	Imre Pulai (HUN)	Martin Doktor (CZE)	Ivan Klementiev (LAT)
1997 Dartmouth	Andreas Dittmer (GER)	Martin Doktor (CZE)	Béla Belicza (HUN)
1998 Szeged	Steve Giles (CAN)	Martin Doktor (CZE)	Andreas Dittmer (GER)
1999 Milan	Maksim Opalev (RUS)	Andreas Dittmer (GER)	Martin Doktor (CZE)
2001 Poznań	Andreas Dittmer (GER)	Martin Doktor (CZE)	György Kolonics (HUN)
2002 Seville	Andreas Dittmer (GER)	Maksim Opalev (RUS)	Steve Giles (CAN)
2003 Gainesville	Andreas Dittmer (GER)	David Cal (ESP)	Maksim Opalev (RUS)
2005 Zagreb	Andreas Dittmer (GER)	David Cal (ESP)	Richard Dalton (CAN)
2006 Szeged	José Everado Cristóbal (MEX)	Andreas Dittmer (GER)	Attila Vajda (HUN)
2007 Duisburg	Attila Vajda (HUN)	Marián Ostrčil (SVK)	David Cal (ESP)
2009 Dartmouth	Vadim Menkov (UZB)	Mathieu Goubel (FRA)	Sebastian Brendel (GER)
2010 Poznań	Vadim Menkov (UZB)	Attila Vajda (HUN)	Sebastian Brendel (GER)
2011 Szeged	Attila Vajda (HUN)	David Cal (ESP)	Vadim Menkov (UZB)
2013 Duisburg	Attila Vajda (HUN)	Sebastian Brendel (GER)	Isaquias Queiroz (BRA)
2014 Moscow	Sebastian Brendel (GER)	Martin Fuksa (CZE)	Attila Vajda (HUN)
2015 Milan	Sebastian Brendel (GER)	Martin Fuksa (CZE)	Serghei Tarnovschi (MDA)
2017 Račice	Sebastian Brendel (GER)	Martin Fuksa (CZE)	Isaquias Queiroz (BRA)
2018 Montemor-o-Velho	Sebastian Brendel (GER)	Martin Fuksa (CZE)	Isaquias Queiroz (BRA)
2019 Szeged	Isaquias Queiroz (BRA)	Tomasz Kaczor (POL)	Adrien Bart (FRA)
2021 Copenhagen	Conrad-Robin Scheibner (GER)	Martin Fuksa (CZE)	Balázs Adolf (HUN)
2022 Dartmouth	Cătălin Chirilă (ROU)	Isaquias Queiroz (BRA)	Martin Fuksa (CZE)
2023 Duisburg	Martin Fuksa (CZE)	Cătălin Chirilă (ROU)	Sebastian Brendel (GER)
2025 Milan	Martin Fuksa (CZE)	Stefanos Dimopoulos (GRE)	Balázs Adolf (HUN)
2026 Poznán	Dániel Fejes (HUN); Martin Fuksa (CZE)	None awarded	Zakhar Petrov (AIN-A)

== C-1 5000 m ==
Debuted: 2010

Games	Gold	Silver	Bronze
2010 Poznań	Ronald Verch (GER)	José Luis Bouza (ESP)	Marián Ostrčil (SVK)
2011 Szeged	Mykhaylo Koshman (UKR)	Lukáš Koranda (CZE)	José Luis Bouza (ESP)
2013 Duisburg	Sebastian Brendel (GER)	Attila Vajda (HUN)	Mark Oldershaw (CAN)
2014 Moscow	Sebastian Brendel (GER)	Attila Vajda (HUN)	Pavel Petrov (RUS)
2015 Milan	Sebastian Brendel (GER)	Manuel Antonio Campos (ESP)	Mateusz Kamiński (POL)
2017 Račice	Sebastian Brendel (GER)	Serguey Torres (CUB)	Mateusz Kamiński (POL)
2018 Montemor-o-Velho	Sebastian Brendel (GER)	Fernando Jorge (CUB)	Kirill Shamshurin (RUS)
2019 Szeged	Sebastian Brendel (GER)	Balázs Adolf (HUN)	Fernando Jorge (CUB)
2021 Copenhagen	Balázs Adolf (HUN)	Sebastian Brendel (GER)	Kirill Shamshurin (RUS)
2022 Dartmouth	Serghei Tarnovschi (MDA)	Serguey Torres (CUB)	Sebastian Brendel (GER)
2023 Duisburg	Balázs Adolf (HUN)	Sebastian Brendel (GER)	Wiktor Głazunow (POL)
2024 Samarkand	Wiktor Głazunow (POL)	Serghei Tarnovschi (MDA)	Balázs Adolf (HUN)
2025 Milan	Serghei Tarnovschi (MDA)	Jaime Duro (ESP)	Wiktor Głazunow (POL)
2026 Poznán	Balázs Adolf (HUN)	Jaime Duro (ESP)	Robin Hirsch (CZE)

== C-1 10000 m ==
Debuted: 1950. Discontinued: 1993.

Games	Gold	Silver	Bronze
1950 Copenhagen	Robert Boutigny (FRA)	Josef Holeček (TCH)	Bengt Backlund (SWE)
1954 Mâcon	Jiří Vokněr (TCH)	František Čapek (TCH)	István Hernek (HUN)
1958 Prague	Gennady Bukharin (URS)	Jiří Vokněr (TCH)	Nichifor Tarara (ROU)
1963 Jajce	Mikhail Zamotin (URS)	Andrei Igorov (ROU)	Albrecht Müller (GDR)
1966 East Berlin	Antal Hajba (HUN)	Rudolf Pěnkava (TCH)	Mikhail Zamotin (URS)
1970 Copenhagen	Tamás Wichmann (HUN)	Afansie Butelchin (ROU)	Nikolay Fedulov (URS)
1971 Belgrade	Tamás Wichmann (HUN)	Vasiliy Yurchenko (URS)	Lipat Varabiev (ROU)
1973 Tampere	Vasiliy Yurchenko (URS)	Lipat Varabiev (ROU)	Tamás Wichmann (HUN)
1974 Mexico City	Tamás Wichmann (HUN)	Vasiliy Yurchenko (URS)	Ivan Patzaichin (ROU)
1975 Belgrade	Vasiliy Yurchenko (URS)	Károly Szegedi (HUN)	Matija Ljubek (YUG)
1977 Sofia	Tamás Wichmann (HUN)	Vasiliy Yurchenko (URS)	Ivan Patzaichin (ROU)
1978 Belgrade	Ivan Patzaichin (ROU)	Vasiliy Yurchenko (URS)	Matija Ljubek (YUG)
1979 Duisburg	Tamás Wichmann (HUN)	Sergeiy Liminovich (URS)	Ivan Patzaichin (ROU)
1981 Nottingham	Tamás Wichmann (HUN)	Matija Ljubek (YUG)	Sergeiy Liminovich (URS)
1982 Belgrade	Tamás Wichmann (HUN)	Jiří Vrdlovec (TCH)	Gheorghe Titu (ROU)
1983 Tampere	Jiří Vrdlovec (TCH)	Gheorghe Titu (ROU)	Tamás Wichmann (HUN)
1985 Mechelen	Jiří Vrdlovec (TCH)	Takhir Kamaletdinov (URS)	Attila Lipták (HUN)
1986 Montreal	Aurel Macarencu (ROU)	Ivan Šabjan (YUG)	Didier Hoyer (FRA)
1987 Duisburg	Ivan Šabjan (YUG)	Zsolt Bohács (HUN)	Takhir Kamaletdinov (URS)
1989 Plovdiv	Ivan Klementiev (URS)	Zsolt Bohács (HUN)	Jan Bartůněk (TCH)
1990 Poznań	Zsolt Bohács (HUN)	Jan Bartůněk (TCH)	Ivan Klementiev (URS)
1991 Paris	Zsolt Bohács (HUN)	Ivan Klementiev (URS)	Andrew Train (GBR)
1993 Copenhagen	Zsolt Bohács (HUN)	Pavel Bednář (CZE)	Andreas Dittmer (GER)

== C-2 200 m ==
Debuted: 1994.

Games	Gold	Silver	Bronze
1994 Mexico City	Aleksandr Masseykov; Dmitriy Dovgailyonok; Belarus	György Kolonics; Csaba Horváth; Hungary	Olivier Boivin; Sylvain Hoyer; France
1995 Duisburg	György Kolonics; Csaba Horváth; Hungary	Mark Eschelbach; Thomas Zereske; Germany	Martin Marinov; Blagovest Stoyanov; Bulgaria
1997 Dartmouth	Thomas Zereske; Christian Gille; Germany	Pavel Konovalov; Vladimir Ladosha; Russia	Petr Fuksa; Pavel Bednář; Czech Republic
1998 Szeged	Thomas Zereske; Christian Gille; Germany	Miklós Buzál; Attila Végh; Hungary	Vladislav Polzounov; Andrey Kabanov; Russia
1999 Milan	Konstantin Fomichev; Aleksandr Artemida; Russia	Daniel Jędraszko; Paweł Baraszkiewicz; Poland	Thomas Zereske; Christian Gille; Germany
2001 Poznań	Paweł Baraszkiewicz; Daniel Jędraszko; Poland	Ionel Averian; Mikhail Vartolemei; Romania	Ibrahim Rojas; Leobaldo Pereira; Cuba
2002 Seville	Ibrahim Rojas; Ledi Balceiro; Cuba	Petr Fuksa; Petr Netušil; Czech Republic	Mikhail Vartolemei; Ionel Averian; Romania
2003 Gainesville	Paweł Baraszkiewicz; Daniel Jędraszko; Poland	Petr Fuksa; Petr Netušil; Czech Republic	Sergiy Klimniuk; Dmitriy Sabin; Ukraine
2005 Zagreb	Yevgeniy Ignatov; Nikolay Lipkin; Russia	Christian Gille; Tomasz Wylenzek; Germany	Serguey Torres; Karel Aguilar; Cuba
2006 Szeged	Yevgeniy Ignatov; Ivan Shtyl; Russia	Christian Gille; Tomasz Wylenzek; Germany	Raimundas Labuckas; Tomas Gadeikis; Lithuania
2007 Duisburg	Yevgeniy Ignatov; Ivan Shtyl; Russia	Christian Gille; Tomasz Wylenzek; Germany	Raimundas Labuckas; Tomas Gadeikis; Lithuania
2009 Dartmouth	Tomas Gadeikis; Raimundas Labuckas; Lithuania	Yevgeniy Ignatov; Ivan Shtyl; Russia	Stefan Holtz; Robert Nuck; Germany
2010 Poznań	Raimundas Labuckas; Tomas Gadeikis; Lithuania	Yevgeniy Ignatov; Ivan Shtyl; Russia	Paweł Skowroński; Paweł Baraszkiewicz; Poland
2011 Szeged	Raimundas Labuckas; Tomas Gadeikis; Lithuania	Viktor Melantyev; Nikolay Lipkin; Russia	Dzmitry Rabchanka; Aleksandr Vauchetskiy; Belarus
2013 Duisburg	Robert Nuck; Stefan Holtz; Germany	Alexander Kovalenko; Nikolay Lipkin; Russia	Dzmitry Rabchanka; Aleksandr Vauchetskiy; Belarus
2014 Moscow	Alexey Korovashkov; Ivan Shtyl; Russia	Stefan Holtz; Robert Nuck; Germany	Isaquias Queiroz; Erlon Silva; Brazil
2015 Milan	Alexey Korovashkov; Ivan Shtyl; Russia	Hleb Saladhuka; Dzianis Makhlai; Belarus	Stefan Holtz; Robert Nuck; Germany
2017 Račice	Ivan Shtyl; Alexander Kovalenko; Russia	Michał Łubniewski; Arsen Śliwiński; Poland	Ádám Fekete; Jonatán Hajdu; Hungary
2018 Montemor-o-Velho	Hleb Saladhuka; Dzianis Makhlai; Belarus	Michał Łubniewski; Arsen Śliwiński; Poland	Alexander Kovalenko; Ivan Shtyl; Russia
2019 Szeged	Alberto Pedrero; Pablo Graña; Spain	Michał Łubniewski; Arsen Śliwiński; Poland	Artur Guliev; Elyorjon Mamadaliev; Uzbekistan

== C-2 500 m ==
Debuted: 1971.

Games	Gold	Silver	Bronze
1971 Belgrade	Gheorghe Danielov; Gheorghe Simionov; Romania	Yuri Lobanov; Vladimir Pankov; Soviet Union	Viktor Boitschev; Fedja Stefanov; Bulgaria
1973 Tampere	Oleg Kalidov; Vitaliy Slobodenyuk; Soviet Union	Gheorghe Danielov; Gheorghe Simionov; Romania	Jerzy Opara; Andrzej Gronowicz; Poland
1974 Mexico City	Aleksandr Vinogradov; Yuri Lobanov; Soviet Union	Gheorghe Danielov; Gheorghe Simionov; Romania	Tomáš Šach; Jiří Čtvrtečka; Czechoslovakia
1975 Belgrade	Aleksandr Vinogradov; Yuri Lobanov; Soviet Union	Tomáš Šach; Jiří Čtvrtečka; Czechoslovakia	Gábor Árva; Péter Povázsay; Hungary
1977 Sofia	László Foltán; István Vaskuti; Hungary	John Wood; Gregory Smith; Canada	Vasiliy Jurtzhenko; Yuri Lobanov; Soviet Union
1978 Belgrade	László Foltán; István Vaskuti; Hungary	Sergey Petrenko; Pytor Grigonis; Soviet Union	Gheorghe Simionov; Toma Simionov; Romania
1979 Duisburg	Ivan Patzaichin; Istvan Capusta; Romania	Sergey Petrenko; Aleksandr Vinogradov; Soviet Union	Marek Łbik; Piotr Pawlowski; Poland
1981 Nottingham	László Foltán; István Vaskuti; Hungary	Edem Muradosilov; Vigantas Zhekaitis; Soviet Union	Liubomir Ljubenov; Sevdalin Ilkov; Bulgaria
1982 Belgrade	Matija Ljubek; Mirko Nišović; Yugoslavia	Yuriy Laptikov; Sergey Petrenko; Soviet Union	László Foltán; István Vaskuti; Hungary
1983 Tampere	Matija Ljubek; Mirko Nišović; Yugoslavia	Ivan Klementiev; Sergey Ossadzhiy; Soviet Union	Dumitru Bețiu; Fiodor Gurei; Romania
1985 Mechelen	János Sarusi Kis; István Vaskuti; Hungary	Marek Łbik; Marek Dopierała; Poland	Ulrich Papke; Uwe Madeja; East Germany
1986 Montreal	János Sarusi Kis; István Vaskuti; Hungary	Viktor Reneisky; Aleksandr Kalnitzhenko; Soviet Union	Ulrich Papke; Ingo Spelly; East Germany
1987 Duisburg	Marek Łbik; Marek Dopierała; Poland	Yuriy Gurin; Valeriy Veshko; Soviet Union	Petr Procházka; Alon Lochinsky; Czechoslovakia
1989 Plovdiv	Viktor Reneisky; Nicolae Juravschi; Soviet Union	Tomasz Goliasz; Marek Łbik; Poland	Joël Bettin; Philippe Renaud; France
1990 Poznań	Viktor Reneisky; Nicolae Juravschi; Soviet Union	Ulrich Papke; Ingo Spelly; East Germany	Attila Pálizs; György Zala; Hungary
1991 Paris	Attila Pálizs; Attila Szabó; Hungary	Viktor Reneisky; Nicolae Juravschi; Soviet Union	Olivier Boivin; Didier Hoyer; France
1993 Copenhagen	György Kolonics; Csaba Horváth; Hungary	Christian Frederiksen; Arne Nielsson; Denmark	Andreas Dittmer; Gunar Kirchbach; Germany
1994 Mexico City	Gheorghe Andriev; Grigore Obreja; Romania	György Kolonics; Csaba Horváth; Hungary	Blagovest Stoyanov; Martin Marinov; Bulgaria
1995 Duisburg	György Kolonics; Csaba Horváth; Hungary	Viktor Reneisky; Nicolae Juravschi; Moldova	Andreas Dittmer; Gunar Kirchbach; Germany
1997 Dartmouth	György Kolonics; Csaba Horváth; Hungary	Daniel Jędraszko; Paweł Baraszkiewicz; Poland	Thomas Zereske; Christian Gille; Germany
1998 Szeged	György Kolonics; Csaba Horváth; Hungary	Daniel Jędraszko; Paweł Baraszkiewicz; Poland	Thomas Zereske; Christian Gille; Germany
1999 Milan	Daniel Jędraszko; Paweł Baraszkiewicz; Poland	Imre Pulai; Ferenc Novák; Hungary	Aleksandr Kovalyov; Aleksandr Kostoglod; Russia
2001 Poznań	Ibrahim Rojas; Leobaldo Pereira; Cuba	Daniel Jędraszko; Paweł Baraszkiewicz; Poland	Mitică Pricop; Florin Popescu; Romania
2002 Seville	Ibrahim Rojas; Ledi Balceiro; Cuba	Florin Popescu; Silviu Simioncencu; Romania	Sergey Ulegin; Aleksandr Kostoglod; Russia
2003 Gainesville	Paweł Baraszkiewicz; Daniel Jędraszko; Poland	Silviu Simioncencu; Florin Popescu; Romania	Ibrahim Rojas; Ledi Balceiro; Cuba
2005 Zagreb	Christian Gille; Tomasz Wylenzek; Germany	György Kozmann; György Kolonics; Hungary	Serguey Torres; Karel Aguilar; Cuba
2006 Szeged	Aleksandr Kostoglod; Sergey Ulegin; Russia	Stefan Holtz; Robert Nuck; Germany	György Kozmann; György Kolonics; Hungary
2007 Duisburg	György Kozmann; György Kolonics; Hungary	Josif Chirilă; Andrei Cuculici; Romania	Christian Gille; Tomasz Wylenzek; Germany
2009 Dartmouth	Stefan Holtz; Robert Nuck; Germany	Yevgeniy Ignatov; Ivan Shtyl; Russia	Sergey Bezugliy; Maksim Prokopenko; Azerbaijan
2010 Poznań	Alexandru Dumitrescu; Victor Mihalachi; Romania	Sergey Bezugliy; Maksim Prokopenko; Azerbaijan	Pavel Petrov; Alexander Kostoglod; Russia
2011 Szeged	Alexandru Dumitrescu; Victor Mihalachi; Romania	Sergiy Bezugliy; Maksim Prokopenko; Azerbaijan	Peter Kretschmer; Kurt Kuschela; Germany
2013 Duisburg	Viktor Melantyev; Ivan Shtyl; Russia	Henrik Vasbányai; Róbert Mike; Hungary	Jaroslav Radoň; Filip Dvořák; Czech Republic
2014 Moscow	Alexey Korovashkov; Ivan Shtyl; Russia	Alexandru Dumitrescu; Victor Mihalachi; Romania	Rolexis Baez; Serguey Torres; Cuba
2015 Milan	Pavel Petrov; Mikhail Pavlov; Russia	Wiktor Głazunow; Vincent Słomiński; Poland	Dmytro Ianchuk; Taras Mishchuk; Ukraine
2017 Račice	Ivan Shtyl; Viktor Melantyev; Russia	Victor Mihalachi; Leonid Carp; Romania	Sergiu Craciun; Nicolae Craciun; Italy
2018 Montemor-o-Velho	Isaquias Queiroz; Erlon Silva; Brazil	Viktor Melantyev; Vladislav Chebotar; Russia	Arsen Śliwiński; Michał Łubniewski; Poland
2019 Szeged	Li Qiang; Xing Song; China	Jonatán Hajdu; Ádám Fekete; Hungary	Sete Benavides; Antoni Segura; Spain
2021 Copenhagen	Nicolae Craciun; Daniele Santini; Italy	Jonatán Hajdu; Ádám Fekete; Hungary	Viktor Melantyev; Vladislav Chebotar (RCF)
2022 Dartmouth	Cayetano García; Pablo Martínez; Spain	Wiktor Głazunow; Tomasz Barniak; Poland	Liu Hao; Ji Bowen; China
2023 Duisburg	Peter Kretschmer; Tim Hecker; Germany	Liu Hao; Ji Bowen; China	Cayetano García; Pablo Martínez; Spain
2025 Milan	Zakhar Petrov; Ivan Shtyl; AIN	Yu Yuebin; Yu Chenwei; China	Kristóf Kollár; István Juhász; Hungary
2026 Poznán	Zakhar Petrov; Ivan Shtyl; AIN	Gabriel Assunção; Jacky Godmann; Brazil	Kristóf Kollár; István Juhász; Hungary

Sergey Ulegin and Aleksandr Kostoglod of Russia finished second in the 2003 event, but were stripped of the silver medals when Ulegin tested positive for doping.

== C-2 1000 m ==
Debuted: 1938. Not held: 1948. Resumed: 1950.

Games	Gold	Silver	Bronze
1938 Vaxholm	Rupert Weinstabl; Karl Proisl; Austria	Bohuslav Karlík; Jan Brzák-Felix; Czechoslovakia	Václáv Mottl; Zdeněk Škrland; Czechoslovakia
1950 Copenhagen	Jan Brzák-Felix; Bohumil Kudrna; Czechoslovakia	Georges Dransart; Armand Loreau; France	Václáv Havel; Jiří Pecka; Czechoslovakia
1954 Mâcon	Kurt Liebhart; Engelbert Lulla; Austria	István Bodor; József Tuza; Hungary	Ferenc Csonka; Mihály Sasvári; Hungary
1958 Prague	Alexe Dumitru; Simion Ismailciuc; Romania	László Simari; Lajos Bodnar; Hungary	Jiří Kodeš; Václav Vokál; Czechoslovakia
1963 Jajce	Achim Sidorov; Alexe Iacovici; Romania	Vitaliy Galkov; Mikhail Samotin; Soviet Union	Endre Gyürü; Árpád Soltész; Hungary
1966 East Berlin	Vicol Calabiciov; Serghei Covaliov; Romania	Bernd Lindelöf; Erik Zeidlitz; Sweden	Árpád Soltész; Csaba Szantó; Hungary
1970 Copenhagen	Ivan Patzaichin; Serghei Covaliov; Romania	Tamás Wichmann; Gyula Petrikovics; Hungary	Boris Lubenov; Sachko Iliev; Bulgaria
1971 Belgrade	Tamás Wichmann; Gyula Petrikovics; Hungary	Ivan Patzaichin; Serghei Covaliov; Romania	Viktor Boitschev; Fedia Damianov; Bulgaria
1973 Tampere	Ivan Patzaichin; Serghei Covaliov; Romania	Vladas Česiūnas; Yuri Lobanov; Soviet Union	Tamás Wichmann; Gyula Petrikovics; Hungary
1974 Mexico City	Vladas Česiūnas; Yuri Lobanov; Soviet Union	Jerzy Opara; Andrzej Gronowicz; Poland	Cherasim Munteanu; Vasile Serghei; Romania
1975 Belgrade	Gábor Árva; Péter Povázsay; Hungary	Gheorghe Danielov; Gheorghe Simionov; Romania	Roman Vyzhenko; Aleksandr Vinogradov; Soviet Union
1977 Sofia	Vasiliy Jurtzhenko; Yuri Lobanov; Soviet Union	Tamás Buday; Oszkár Frey; Hungary	Jerzy Opara; Andrzej Gronowicz; Poland
1978 Belgrade	Tamás Buday; Oszkár Frey; Hungary	Gheorghe Simionov; Toma Simionov; Romania	Sergey Postrechin; Yuri Lobanov; Soviet Union
1979 Duisburg	Vasiliy Jurtzhenko; Yuri Lobanov; Soviet Union	Tamás Buday; Oszkár Frey; Hungary	Toma Simionov; Gheorghe Simionov; Romania
1981 Nottingham	Ivan Patzaichin; Toma Simionov; Romania	Olaf Heukrodt; Uwe Madeja; East Germany	Edem Muradosilov; Vigantas Zhekaitis; Soviet Union
1982 Belgrade	János Sarusi Kis; Gyula Hajdu; Hungary	Matija Ljubek; Mirko Nišović; Yugoslavia	Olaf Heukrodt; Uwe Madeja; East Germany
1983 Tampere	Ivan Patzaichin; Toma Simionov; Romania	Olaf Heukrodt; Alexander Schuck; East Germany	Matija Ljubek; Mirko Nišović; Yugoslavia
1985 Mechelen	Olaf Heukrodt; Alexander Schuck; East Germany	Matija Ljubek; Mirko Nišović; Yugoslavia	Marek Łbik; Marek Dopierała; Poland
1986 Montreal	János Sarusi Kis; István Vaskuti; Hungary	Marek Łbik; Marek Dopierała; Poland	Wolfram Faust; Hartmut Faust; West Germany
1987 Duisburg	Yuriy Gurin; Valeriy Veshko; Soviet Union	Marek Łbik; Marek Dopierała; Poland	Ulrich Papke; Ingo Spelly; East Germany
1989 Plovdiv	Christian Frederiksen; Arne Nielsson; Denmark	Olivier Boivin; Didier Hoyer; France	Yuriy Gurin; Valeriy Veshko; Soviet Union
1990 Poznań	Ulrich Papke; Ingo Spelly; East Germany	Gheorghe Andriev; Vasile Lehaci; Romania	Aleksandr Gramovich; Yuriy Gurin; Soviet Union
1991 Paris	Ulrich Papke; Ingo Spelly; Germany	Olivier Boivin; Didier Hoyer; France	Viktor Reneisky; Nicolae Juravschi; Soviet Union
1993 Copenhagen	Christian Frederiksen; Arne Nielsson; Denmark	Olivier Boivin; Didier Hoyer; France	Ulrich Papke; Ingo Spelly; Germany
1994 Mexico City	Andreas Dittmer; Gunar Kirchbach; Germany	Ferenc Novák; Gáspár Boldizsár; Hungary	Dariusz Koszykowski; Tomasz Goliasz; Poland
1995 Duisburg	György Kolonics; Csaba Horváth; Hungary	Antonel Borșan; Marcel Glăvan; Romania	Andreas Dittmer; Gunar Kirchbach; Germany
1997 Dartmouth	Gunar Kirchbach; Matthias Röder; Germany	György Kolonics; Csaba Horváth; Hungary	Andrew Train; Stephen Train; United Kingdom
1998 Szeged	Aleksandr Kovalyov; Aleksandr Kostoglod; Russia	Gheorghe Andriev; Florin Popescu; Romania	György Zala; Endre Ipacs; Hungary
1999 Milan	Aleksandr Kovalyov; Aleksandr Kostoglod; Russia	Ibrahim Rojas; Leobaldo Pereira; Cuba	Patrick Schulze; Peter John; Germany
2001 Poznań	Marcin Kobierski; Michał Śliwiński; Poland	José Alfredo Bea; David Mascató; Spain	Ibrahim Rojas; Leobaldo Pereira; Cuba
2002 Seville	Marcin Kobierski; Michał Śliwiński; Poland	Ibrahim Rojas; Ledi Balceiro; Cuba	Richard Dalton; Mike Scarola; Canada
2003 Gainesville	Silviu Simioncencu; Florin Popescu; Romania	Aleksandr Kovalyov; Aleksandr Kostoglod; Russia	György Kozmann; György Kolonics; Hungary
2005 Zagreb	Christian Gille; Tomasz Wylenzek; Germany	Serguey Torres; Karel Aguilar; Cuba	György Kozmann; György Kolonics; Hungary
2006 Szeged	György Kozmann; György Kolonics; Hungary	Attila Buday; Tamás Buday Jr. Canada	Maksym Prokopenko; Sergiy Bezugily; Ukraine
2007 Duisburg	Christian Gille; Tomasz Wylenzek; Germany	Serguey Torres; Karel Aguilar; Cuba	Wojciech Tyszyński; Paweł Baraszkiewicz; Poland
2009 Dartmouth	Erik Leue; Tomasz Wylenzek; Germany	Sergiy Bezugliy; Maksim Prokopenko; Azerbaijan	Nikolay Lipkin; Viktor Melantyev; Russia
2010 Poznań	Alexandru Dumitrescu; Victor Mihalachi; Romania	Andrei Bahdanovich; Aliaksandr Bahdanovich; Belarus	Márton Tóth; Róbert Mike; Hungary
2011 Szeged	Stefan Holtz; Tomasz Wylenzek; Germany	Sergiy Bezugliy; Maksim Prokopenko; Azerbaijan	Alexandru Dumitrescu; Victor Mihalachi; Romania
2013 Duisburg	Henrik Vasbányai; Róbert Mike; Hungary	Viktor Melantyev; Ilya Pervukhin; Russia	Jaroslav Radoň; Filip Dvořák; Czech Republic
2014 Moscow	Alexandru Dumitrescu; Victor Mihalachi; Romania	Henrik Vasbányai; Róbert Mike; Hungary	Yul Oeltze; Ronald Verch; Germany
2015 Milan	Erlon Silva; Isaquias Queiroz; Brazil	Henrik Vasbányai; Róbert Mike; Hungary	Piotr Kuleta; Marcin Grzybowski; Poland
2017 Račice	Peter Kretschmer; Yul Oeltze; Germany	Serguey Torres; Fernando Enriquez; Cuba	Viktor Melantyev; Vladislav Chebotar; Russia
2018 Montemor-o-Velho	Yul Oeltze; Peter Kretschmer; Germany	Serguey Torres; Fernando Enrique; Cuba	Kirill Shamshurin; Ilya Pervukhin; Russia
2019 Szeged	Liu Hao; Wang Hao; China	Serguey Torres; Fernando Jorge; Cuba	Erlon Silva; Isaquias Queiroz; Brazil
2021 Copenhagen	Kirill Shamshurin; Vladislav Chebotar (RCF)	Wiktor Głazunow; Tomasz Barniak; Poland	Serguey Torres; Fernando Jorge; Cuba
2022 Dartmouth	Sebastian Brendel; Tim Hecker; Germany	Liu Hao; Ji Bowen; China	Craig Spence; Bret Himmelman; Canada
2023 Duisburg	Nicolae Craciun; Daniele Santini; Italy	Moritz Adam; Nico Pickert; Germany	Ilie Sprîncean; Oleg Nuţă; Romania
2024 Samarkand	Zakhar Petrov; Ivan Dmitriev; AIN	Balázs Adolf; Dániel Fejes; Hungary	Yurii Vandiuk; Pavlo Borsuk; Ukraine

== C-2 10000 m ==
Debuted: 1938. Not held: 1948. Resumed: 1950. Discontinued: 1993.

Games	Gold	Silver	Bronze
1938 Vaxholm	Bohuslav Karlík; Jan Brzák-Felix; Czechoslovakia	Rupert Weinstabl; Karl Proisl; Austria	Christian Holzenberg; Heinz Jürgens; Germany
1950 Copenhagen	Jan Brzák-Felix; Bohumil Kudrna; Czechoslovakia	Georges Dransart; Armand Loreau; France	Bohuslav Karlík; Oldřich Lomecký; Czechoslovakia
1954 Mâcon	Károly Wieland; József Halmay; Hungary	Ferenc Csonka; Mihály Sasvári; Hungary	Jaroslav Sieger; Zdeněk Ziegler; Czechoslovakia
1958 Prague	Stepan Ostzhenkov; Aleksandr Silayev; Soviet Union	Achim Sidorov; Lavrenti Kalinov; Romania	Jiří Kodeš; Václav Vokál; Czechoslovakia
1963 Jajce	Leonid Geishtor; Sergey Makarenko; Soviet Union	Willi Mehlberg; Werner Ulrich; East Germany	Lavrenti Kalinov; Igor Lipalit; Romania
1966 East Berlin	Petre Maxim; Gheorghe Simionov; Romania	Valeriy Drybas; Andrey Chimish; Soviet Union	András Peter; István Cserha; Hungary
1970 Copenhagen	Petre Maxim; Gheorghe Simionov; Romania	Valeriy Drybas; Vasiliy Kalyagin; Soviet Union	Bernt Lindelöf; Eric Zeidlitz; Sweden
1971 Belgrade	Naum Prokupets; Aleksandr Vinogradov; Soviet Union	László Hingt; István Cserha; Hungary	Serghei Covaliov; Vicol Calabiciov; Romania
1973 Tampere	Vladas Česiūnas; Yuri Lobanov; Soviet Union	Vasile Serghei; Cherasim Munteanu; Romania	Tamás Buday; Gábor Haraszti; Hungary
1974 Mexico City	Vladas Česiūnas; Yuri Lobanov; Soviet Union	Tamás Buday; Gábor Haraszti; Hungary	Alain Acard; Jean-Paul Cézard; France
1975 Belgrade	Vladas Česiūnas; Yuri Lobanov; Soviet Union	Tamás Buday; Oszkár Frey; Hungary	Ivan Burtschin; Stefan Iliev; Bulgaria
1977 Sofia	Sergey Petrenko; Yuri Lobanov; Soviet Union	Lipat Varabiev; Pavel Cozlov; Romania	Zoltán Parti; András Hubik; Hungary
1978 Belgrade	Tamás Buday; László Vaskúti; Hungary	Gheorghe Simionov; Toma Simionov; Romania	Viktor Vorobiyev; Aleksandr Beleyi; Soviet Union
1979 Duisburg	Vasiliy Jurtzhenko; Yuri Lobanov; Soviet Union	Cherasim Munteanu; Gheorge Titu; Romania	Tamás Buday; László Vaskúti; Hungary
1981 Nottingham	Tamás Buday; László Vaskúti; Hungary	Ivan Patzaichin; Toma Simionov; Romania	Jiří Vrdlovec; Petr Kubíček; Czechoslovakia
1982 Belgrade	Ivan Patzaichin; Toma Simionov; Romania	Vasiliy Beresa; Edem Muradosilov; Soviet Union	Tamás Buday; László Vaskúti; Hungary
1983 Tampere	Tamás Buday; László Vaskúti; Hungary	Ivan Patzaichin; Toma Simionov; Romania	Sergey Petrenko; Yuriy Laptikov; Soviet Union
1985 Mechelen	Matija Ljubek; Mirko Nišović; Yugoslavia	Andrew Train; Stephen Train; United Kingdom	Matei Kalpakov; Tosho Kalpakov; Bulgaria
1986 Montreal	Marek Łbik; Marek Dopierała; Poland	Dumitru Bețiu; Vasile Lehaci; Romania	Arne Nielsson; Christian Frederiksen; Denmark
1987 Duisburg	Arne Nielsson; Christian Frederiksen; Denmark	Róbert Rideg; Pál Pétervári; Hungary	Andrew Train; Stephen Train; United Kingdom
1989 Plovdiv	Christian Frederiksen; Arne Nielsson; Denmark	Olivier Boivin; Didier Hoyer; France	Andrew Train; Stephen Train; United Kingdom
1990 Poznań	Christian Frederiksen; Arne Nielsson; Denmark	Gheorghe Andriev; Vasile Lehaci; Romania	Andrey Balabanov; Viktor Dobrotvorskiy; Soviet Union
1991 Paris	István Gyulay; Pál Pétervári; Hungary	Gheorghe Andriev; Romice Haralambie; Romania	Andrew Train; Stephen Train; United Kingdom
1993 Copenhagen	Christian Frederiksen; Arne Nielsson; Denmark	Andrew Train; Stephen Train; United Kingdom	Andrey Balabanov; Viktor Dobrotvorskiy; Ukraine

== C-4 200 m ==
Debuted: 1994. Discontinued 2009.

Games	Gold	Silver	Bronze
1994 Mexico City	Pavel Konovalov; Andrey Kabanov; Sergey Chemerov; Aleksandr Kostoglod; Russia	György Kolonics; Csaba Horváth; Attila Szabó; Ervin Hoffmann; Hungary	Petr Procházka; Tomáš Křivánek; Roman Dittrich; Waldemar Fibigr; Czech Republic
1995 Duisburg	Ervin Hoffmann; Attila Szabó; György Kolonics; Csaba Horváth; Hungary	Petr Procházka; Tomáš Křivánek; Roman Dittrich; Waldemar Fibigr; Czech Republic	Olivier Boivin; Sylvain Hoyer; Éric le Leuch; Benoît Bernard; France
1997 Dartmouth	Aleksandr Masseykov; Andrey Beliayev; Anatoliy Reneiskiy; Vladimir Marinov; Belarus	György Kolonics; Csaba Horváth; Ervin Hoffmann; Béla Belicza; Hungary	Petr Procházka; Tomáš Křivánek; Pavel Bednář; Petr Fuksa; Czech Republic
1998 Szeged	Petr Procházka; Tomáš Křivánek; Petr Fuksa; Karel Kožíšek; Czech Republic	Aleksandr Masseykov; Andrey Beliayev; Anatoliy Reneiskiy; Vladimir Marinov; Belarus	Pavel Konovalov; Konstantin Fomichev; Vladimir Ladosha; Aleksandr Kostoglod; Russia
1999 Milan	Roman Kruglyakov; Vladimir Ladosha; Konstantin Fomichev; Andrey Kabanov; Russia	Petr Procházka; Jan Břečka; Petr Fuksa; Karel Kožíšek; Czech Republic	Mitică Pricop; Ionel Averian; Gheorghe Andriev; Florin Popescu; Romania
2001 Poznań	György Zala; György Kozmann; Béla Belicza; Gábor Ivan; Hungary	Petr Netušil; Jan Břečka; Karel Kožíšek; Petr Fuksa; Czech Republic	Aleksandr Kovalyov; Aleksandr Kostoglod; Vladislav Polzounov; Maksim Opalev; Russia
2002 Seville	Maksim Opalev; Roman Kruglyakov; Sergey Ulegin; Aleksandr Kostoglod; Russia	Petr Fuksa; Jan Břečka; Petr Procházka; Karel Kožíšek; Czech Republic	Mikhail Vartolemei; Ionel Averian; Mitică Pricop; Petre Condrat; Romania
2003 Gainesville	Sándor Malomsoki; László Vasali; György Kozmann; György Kolonics; Hungary	Petr Fuksa; Petr Netušil; Jan Břečka; Karel Kožíšek; Czech Republic	Silviu Simioncencu; Mitică Pricop; Florin Popescu; Petre Condrat; Romania
2005 Zagreb	Maksim Opalev; Roman Kruglyakov; Aleksandr Kovalyov; Aleksandr Kostoglod; Russia	Petr Procházka; Petr Netušil; Jan Břečka; Petr Fuksa; Czech Republic	Aleksandr Zhukovskiy; Aleksandr Kurlandchik; Aleksandr Bagdanovich; Sermen Saponenko; Belarus
2006 Szeged	Petr Procházka; Jiří Heller; Jan Břečka; Petr Fuksa; Czech Republic	Konstantin Shcharbak; Dmitriy Rabchanko; Aleksandr Vauchetskiy; Dmitriy Vaitsishkin; Belarus	Pál Sarudi; Márton Joób; Gábor Horváth; Péter Balázs; Hungary
2007 Duisburg	Gábor Horváth; Péter Balázs; Márton Joób; Pál Sarudi; Hungary	Yevgeniy Dorokhin; Nikolay Lipkin; Yevgeniy Ignatov; Ivan Shtyl; Russia	Dmitriy Rabchanko; Dmitriy Vaitsishkin; Konstantin Shcharbak; Aleksandr Vauchetskiy; Belarus
2009 Dartmouth	Aliaksandr Bahdanovich; Dzmitry Rabchanka; Aliaksandr Vauchetski; Dzmitry Vaitsishkin; Belarus	Aleksandr Kostoglod; Nikolay Lipkin; Viktor Melantyev; Sergey Ulegin; Russia	Attilia Bozsil; László Foltán; Gabor Horvath; Gergő Németh; Hungary

Sergey Ulegin, Aleksandr Kostoglod, Roman Kruglyakov, Maksim Opalev of Russia were stripped of their 2003 gold medal when Ulegin tested positive for doping.

== C-4 500 m ==
Debuted: 1989. Discontinued: 2007. Resumed: 2018.

Games	Gold	Silver	Bronze
1989 Plovdiv	Viktor Reneisky; Nikolay Yuravskiy; Yuriy Gurin; Valeriy Veshko; Soviet Union	Attila Szabó; Zsolt Varga; György Zala; Ervin Hoffmann; Hungary	Benoît Bernard; Joël Bettin; Philippe Renaud; Pascal Sylvoz; France
1990 Poznań	Yuriy Gurin; Nikolay Yuravskiy; Viktor Reneisky; Valeriy Veshko; Soviet Union	Zsolt Bohács; Ervin Hoffmann; Gusztáv Leikep; Attila Szabó; Hungary	Nikolay Bukhalov; Traicho Draganov; Paisiy Lubenov; Dejon Slavov; Bulgaria
1991 Paris	Yuriy Gurin; Nikolay Yuravskiy; Viktor Reneisky; Valeriy Veshko; Soviet Union	Benoît Bernard; Joël Bettin; Philippe Renaud; Pascal Sylvoz; France	Axel Berndt; Andreas Dittmer; Sven Montag; Thomas Zereske; Germany
1993 Copenhagen	Ervin Hoffmann; Attila Szabó; Gáspár Boldizsár; Ferenc Novák; Hungary	Andrey Kabanov; Sergey Chemerov; Pavel Konovalov; Aleksandr Kostoglod; Russia	Petr Procházka; Roman Dittrich; Waldemar Fibigr; Tomáš Křivánek; Czech Republic
1994 Mexico City	Ervin Hoffmann; Attila Szabó; Gáspár Boldizsár; Ferenc Novák; Hungary	Marcel Glăvan; Cosmin Pașca; Antonel Borșan; Florin Popescu; Romania	Slavomír Kňazovický; Peter Páleš; Csaba Orosz; Juraj Filip; Slovakia
1995 Duisburg	Ervin Hoffmann; Attila Szabó; György Kolonics; Csaba Horváth; Hungary	Marcel Glăvan; Cosmin Pașca; Antonel Borșan; Florin Popescu; Romania	Rumen Nikolov; Atanas Angelov; Stanimir Atanasov; Dimitar Atanasov; Bulgaria
1997 Dartmouth	György Kolonics; Csaba Horváth; Csaba Hüttner; László Szuszkó; Hungary	Marcel Glăvan; Cosmin Pașca; Antonel Borșan; Florin Popescu; Romania	Sergey Chemerov; Andrey Konovalov; Vladislav Polzounov; Aleksandr Kostoglod; Russia
1998 Szeged	György Kolonics; Csaba Horváth; Csaba Hüttner; László Szuszkó; Hungary	Gheorghe Andriev; Florin Popescu; Cosmin Pașca; Ionel Averian; Romania	Aleksandr Kostoglod; Pavel Konovalov; Vladislav Polzounov; Vladimir Ladosha; Russia
1999 Milan	Roman Kruglyakov; Vladimir Ladosha; Konstantin Fomichev; Andrey Kabanov; Russia	Mitică Pricop; Ionel Averian; Gheorghe Andriev; Florin Popescu; Romania	Yannick Lavigne; Jean-Gilles Grare; Mathieu Goubel; Sylvain Hoyer; France
2001 Poznań	Iosif Anisim; Florin Popescu; Mikhail Vartolemei; Ionel Averian; Romania	György Zala; György Kozmann; Béla Belicza; Gábor Ivan; Hungary	Roman Kruglyakov; Konstantin Fomichev; Vladimir Ladosha; Aleskey Volkinskiy; Russia
2002 Seville	Mikhail Vartolemei; Ionel Averian; Mitică Pricop; Florin Popescu; Romania	Konstantin Fomichev; Aleksandr Artemida; Roman Kruglyakov; Andrey Kabanov; Russia	Daniel Jędraszko; Adam Ginter; Michał Śliwiński; Marcin Grzybowski; Poland
2003 Gainesville	Silviu Simioncencu; Florin Popescu; Mitică Pricop; Petre Condrat; Romania	Adam Ginter; Łukasz Woszczyński; Marcin Grzybowski; Michał Śliwiński; Poland	Csaba Hüttner; Gábor Furdok; Imre Pulai; Ferenc Novák; Hungary
2005 Zagreb	Loredan Popa; Silviu Simioncencu; Florin Popescu; Iosif Chirilă; Romania	Dmitriy Rabchanko; Dmitriy Vaitsishkin; Konstantin Shcharbak; Aleksandr Vauchetskiy; Belarus	Andrzej Jezierski; Michał Śliwiński; Michał Gajownik; Adam Ginter; Poland
2006 Szeged	Dmitriy Rabchanko; Dmitriy Vaitsishkin; Konstantin Shcharbak; Aleksandr Vauchetskiy; Belarus	Łukasz Woszczyński; Paweł Baraszkiewicz; Marcin Grzybowski; Pawel Skowronski; Poland	Gabriel Talpă; Florian Mironic; Loredan Popa; Silviu Simioncencu; Romania
2007 Duisburg	Péter Balázs; Gábor Horváth; Márton Joób; Pál Sarudi; Hungary	Robert Nuck; Sebastian Brendel; Thomas Lück; Stefan Holtz; Germany	Loredan Popa; Ciprian Popa; Niculae Flocea; Florian Mironic; Romania
2018 Montemor-o-Velho	Pavel Petrov; Viktor Melantyev; Mikhail Pavlov; Ivan Shtyl; Russia	Yurii Vandiuk; Oleh Borovyk; Andrii Rybachok; Eduard Shemetylo; Ukraine	Daniele Santini; Sergiu Craciun; Nicolae Craciun; Luca Incollingo; Italy
2019 Szeged	Pavel Petrov; Viktor Melantyev; Mikhail Pavlov; Ivan Shtyl; Russia	Jan Vandrey; Conrad-Robin Scheibner; Tim Hecker; Moritz Adam; Germany	Andrei Bahdanovich; Evgeniy Tengel; Maksim Krysko; Vitali Asetski; Belarus
2021 Copenhagen	Vitaliy Vergeles; Andrii Rybachok; Yurii Vandiuk; Taras Mishchuk; Ukraine	Aleksander Kitewski; Arsen Śliwiński; Michał Łubniewski; Norman Zezula; Poland	Pavel Petrov; Mikhail Pavlov; Viktor Melantyev; Ivan Shtyl; RCF
2022 Dartmouth	Joan Moreno; Pablo Graña; Manuel Fontán; Adrián Sieiro; Spain	Aleksander Kitewski; Arsen Śliwiński; Wiktor Głazunow; Norman Zezula; Poland	Vitaliy Vergeles; Andrii Rybachok; Yurii Vandiuk; Taras Mishchuk; Ukraine
2023 Duisburg	Joan Moreno; Pablo Graña; Manuel Fontán; Adrián Sieiro; Spain	Aleksander Kitewski; Tomasz Barniak; Wiktor Głazunow; Norman Zezula; Poland	Vitaliy Vergeles; Andrii Rybachok; Dmytro Ianchuk; Taras Mishchuk; Ukraine
2025 Milan	Kristóf Kollár; István Juhász; Jonatán Hajdu; Dániel Fejes; Hungary	Daniel Grijalba; Martín Jácome; Manuel Fontán; Adrián Sieiro; Spain	Ilya Verashchaka; Stanislau Savelyeu; Uladzislau Paleshko; Danila Verashchaka; AIN
2026 Poznán	Kristóf Kollár; István Juhász; Jonatán Hajdu; Dániel Fejes; Hungary	Alexey Korovashkov; Aleksandr Bots; Dmitrii Sharov; Matvei Arsenov; AIN	Cayetano García; Pablo Martínez; Manuel Fontán; Diego Domínguez; Spain

Sergey Ulegin, Aleksandr Kostoglod, Roman Kruglyakov, and Maksim Opalev of Russia finished first in the 2003 championships, but were stripped of their gold medal when Ulegin tested positive for doping.

== C-4 1000 m ==
Debuted: 1989.

Games	Gold	Silver	Bronze
1989 Plovdiv	Yuriy Gurin; Nikolay Yuravskiy; Viktor Reneisky; Valeriy Veshko; Soviet Union	Gusztáv Leikep; Attila Szabó; Gábor Takács; Ervin Hoffmann; Hungary	Deyan Bonev; Nikolay Bukhalov; Hristo Georgiev; Paisiy Lubenov; Bulgaria
1990 Poznań	Yuriy Gurin; Nikolay Yuravskiy; Viktor Reneisky; Valeriy Veshko; Soviet Union	Gáspár Boldizsár; Ervin Hoffmann; Gusztáv Leikep; Attila Szabó; Hungary	Nikolay Bukhalov; Traicho Draganov; Paisiy Lubenov; Dejon Slavov; Bulgaria
1991 Paris	Yuriy Gurin; Nikolay Yuravskiy; Viktor Reneisky; Valeriy Veshko; Soviet Union	Olaf Heukrodt; Sven Montag; Ulrich Papke; Ingo Spelly; Germany	Nikolay Bukhalov; Traicho Draganov; Paisiy Lubenov; Dejon Slavov; Bulgaria
1993 Copenhagen	Imre Pulai; György Kolonics; Tibor Takács; Csaba Horváth; Hungary	Andrey Kabanov; Sergey Chemerov; Pavel Konovalov; Aleksandr Kostoglod; Russia	Viktor Dobrotvorskiy; Sergey Osadtchiy; Andrey Balabanov; Aleksandr Klinitchenko; Ukraine
1994 Mexico City	Imre Pulai; György Kolonics; Tibor Takács; Csaba Horváth; Hungary	Marcel Glăvan; Cosmin Pașca; Antonel Borșan; Florin Popescu; Romania	Juan Martínez; Antonio Romero; Ramón Ferrer; Benjamín Castaneda; Mexico
1995 Duisburg	Marcel Glăvan; Cosmin Pașca; Antonel Borșan; Florin Popescu; Romania	Gáspár Boldizsár; Ferenc Novák; Csaba Hüttner; György Zala; Hungary	Ulrich Papke; Patrick Schulze; Christian Gille; Jens Lubrich; Germany
1997 Dartmouth	Marcel Glăvan; Cosmin Pașca; Antonel Borșan; Florin Popescu; Romania	Konstantin Fomichev; Maksim Opalev; Vladislav Polzounov; Aleksandr Kostoglod; Russia	Daniel Jędraszko; Piotr Midloch; Paweł Midloch; Paweł Baraszkiewicz; Poland
1998 Szeged	Csaba Horváth; Béla Belicza; Csaba Hüttner; László Szuszkó; Hungary	Konstantin Fomichev; Vasiliy Mailov; Andrey Kabanov; Ignat Kovalev; Russia	Martin Doktor; Petr Netušil; Jan Macháč; Viktor Jiráský; Czech Republic
1999 Milan	Ignat Kovalev; Konstantin Fomichev; Alexei Volkonski; Andrey Kabanov; Russia	Mitică Pricop; Ionel Averian; Iosif Anisim; Samil Grigoe; Romania	Csaba Horváth; Béla Belicza; Aron Gajarszki; György Kozmann; Hungary
2001 Poznań	György Zala; György Kozmann; Béla Belicza; Gábor Ivan; Hungary	Ivan Skovorodkin; Aleksandr Bagdanovich; Aleksandr Kurlandchik; Aleksandr Zhukovskiy; Belarus	Iosif Anisim; Chirac Marcov; Ionel Averian; Mikhail Vartolemei; Romania
2002 Seville	Andrzej Jezierski; Adam Ginter; Michal Gajowink; Roman Rynkiewicz; Poland	Dimitri Joukovski; Maxim Boilard; Tamás Buday Jr. Attila Buday; Canada	Aleksandr Zhukovskiy; Aleksandr Kurlandchik; Aleksandr Bagdanovich; Sermen Saponenko; Belarus
2003 Gainesville	Csaba Hüttner; Márton Joób; Imre Pulai; Ferenc Novák; Hungary	Attila Buday; Tamás Buday Jr. Maxim Boilard; Dimitri Joukovski; Canada	Andrzej Jezierski; Roman Rynkiewicz; Adam Ginter; Wojciech Tyszyński; Poland
2005 Zagreb	Wojciech Tyszyński; Michał Śliwiński; Andrzej Jezierski; Michal Gajowink; Poland	Constantiin Popa; Loredan Popa; Florin Mironcic; Petre Condrat; Romania	Robert Nuck; Stefan Holtz; Thomas Lück; Stephan Breuing; Germany
2006 Szeged	Robert Nuck; Stephan Breuing; Stefan Holtz; Thomas Lück; Germany	Andrew Russell; Thomas Hall; Kyle Jeffery; Dimitri Joukovski; Canada	Aleksandr Kurlandchyk; Aleksandr Zhukovskiy; Aleksandr Bagdanovich; Andrey Bagdanovich; Belarus
2007 Duisburg	Josif Chirilă; Andrei Cuculici; Silviu Simoncenco; Loredan Popa; Romania	Robert Nuck; Erik Leue; Thomas Lück; Stefan Holtz; Germany	Márton Metka; Róbert Mike; Mátyás Sáfrán; Gábor Balázs; Hungary
2009 Dartmouth	Dzianis Harazha; Dzmitry Rabchanka; Dzmitry Vaitsishkin; Aleksandr Vauchetskiy; Belarus	Chris Wend; Thomas Lück; Erik Rebstock; Ronald Verch; Germany	Cătălin Costache; Silviu Simioncencu; Iosif Chirilă; Andrei Cuculici; Romania
2010 Poznań	Dzmitry Rabchanka; Dzmitry Vaitsishkin; Dzianis Harazha; Aleksandr Vauchetskiy; Belarus	Gabriel Gheoca; Nicolae Bogdan; Mihail Simon; Florin Comănici; Romania	Chris Wend; Tomasz Wylenzek; Ronald Verch; Erik Rebstock; Germany
2011 Szeged	Dzmitry Rabchanka; Dzmitry Vaitsishkin; Dzianis Harazha; Aliaksandr Vauchetski; Belarus	Gabriel Gheoca; Catalin Costache; Florian Comanici; Mihail Simon; Romania	Mátyás Sáfrán; Mihály Sáfrán; Henrik Vasbányai; Szabolcs Németh; Hungary
2013 Duisburg	Kurt Kuschela; Erik Leue; Erik Rebstock; Peter Kretschmer; Germany	Dzmitry Rabchanka; Dzmitry Vaitsishkin; Dzianis Harazha; Aleksandr Vauchetskiy; Belarus	Dávid Korisánszky; Péter Korisánszky; András Vass; Dávid Varga; Hungary
2014 Moscow	Rasul Ishmukhamedov; Viktor Melantyev; Ilya Pervukhin; Kirill Shamshurin; Russia	Dzianis Harazha; Dzmitry Rabchanka; Dzmitry Vaitsishkin; Aleksandr Vauchetskiy; Belarus	Tamás Kiss; Pál Sarudi; Dávid Varga; András Vass; Hungary
2015 Milan	Leonid Carp; Petre Condrat; Josif Chirilă; Stefan Strat; Romania	Denys Kovalenko; Denys Kamerylov; Vitaliy Vergeles; Eduard Shemetylo; Ukraine	Pál Sarudi; Tamás Kiss; András Vass; Dávid Varga; Hungary
2017 Račice	Sebastian Brendel; Stefan Kiraj; Jan Vandrey; Conrad Scheibner; Germany	Piotr Kuleta; Marcin Grzybowski; Tomasz Barniak; Wiktor Głazunow; Poland	Denys Kamerylov; Vitaliy Vergeles; Eduard Shemetylo; Denys Kovalenko; Ukraine

== Relay C-1 4 × 200 m ==
Debuted: 2009. Discontinued in 2014.

Games	Gold	Silver	Bronze
2009 Dartmouth	Yevgeniy Ignatov; Nikolay Lipkin; Viktor Melantyev; Ivan Shtyl; Russia	Attilia Bozsil; László Foltán; Gabor Horvath; Attila Vajda; Hungary	Mathieu Goubel; Thomas Simart; William Tchamba; Bertrand Hémonic; France
2010 Poznań	Ivan Shtyl; Mikhail Pavlov; Nikolay Lipkin; Evgeny Ignatov; Russia	Oleksandr Maksymchuk; Yuriy Cheban; Stanislav Shymansky; Vyacheslav Tsekhosh; Ukraine	Adam Ginter; Roman Rynkiewicz; Mariusz Kruk; Paweł Baraszkiewicz; Poland
2011 Szeged	Ivan Shtyl; Evgeny Ignatov; Alexey Korovashkov; Viktor Melantyev; Russia	Sergiy Bezugliy; Maksim Prokopenko; Valentin Demyanenko; Andriy Kraytor; Azerbaijan	Stefan Holtz; Bjoern Waeschke; Stefan Kiraj; Sebastian Brendel; Germany
2013 Duisburg	Andrey Kraitor; Viktor Melantyev; Andrey Ganin; Ivan Shtyl; Russia	Robert Nuck; Stefan Holtz; Stefan Kiraj; Sebastian Brendel; Germany	Jason McCoombs; Mark Oldershaw; Gabriel Beauchesne-Sévigny; Benjamin Russel; Canada
2014 Moscow	Alexey Korovashkov; Andrey Kraitor; Nikolay Lipkin; Ivan Shtyl; Russia	Yuriy Cheban; Vitalii Goliuk; Oleksandr Maksymchuk; Vadym Tsipan; Ukraine	Jonatán Hajdu; Dávid Korisánszky; Ádám Lantos; Péter Nagy; Hungary

== Mix C-2 200 m ==
Debuted: 2021

Games	Gold	Silver	Bronze
2021 Copenhagen	Irina Andreeva; Ivan Shtyl (RCF)	Michał Łubniewski; Dorota Borowska; Poland	Dávid Korisánszky; Kincső Takács; Hungary

== Mix C-2 500 m ==
Debuted: 2021

Games	Gold	Silver	Bronze
2022 Dartmouth	Connor Fitzpatrick; Katie Vincent; Canada	Sebastian Brendel; Sophie Koch; Germany	Aleksander Kitewski; Sylwia Szczerbińska; Poland
2023 Duisburg	Connor Fitzpatrick; Katie Vincent; Canada	Wiktor Głazunow; Sylwia Szczerbińska; Poland	Olympia Della Giustina; Daniele Santini; Italy
2024 Samarkand	Alexey Korovashkov; Ekaterina Shliapnikova; AIN	Kincső Takács; Jonatán Hajdu; Hungary	Uladzislau Paleshko; Inna Nedelkina; AIN

== Mix C-4 500 m ==
Debuted: 2024

Games	Gold	Silver	Bronze
2024 Samarkand	Sofiia Shtil; Ekaterina Shliapnikova; Zakhar Petrov; Ivan Shtyl; AIN	Anhelina Bardanouskaya; Uladzislau Paleshko; Vitali Asetski; Volha Klimava; AIN	Valéria Oliveira; Viktoriia Yarchevska; Manuel Fontán; Adrián Sieiro; Spain
