= Vaskuti =

Vaskuti or Vaskúti is a Hungarian surname. Notable people with the surname include:

- István Vaskuti (born 1955), Hungarian sprint canoeist
- László Vaskúti (fl. 1970s–1980s), Hungarian sprint canoeist
