= Lubenov =

Lubenov (masculine, Bulgarian: Любенов) or Lubenova (feminine, Bulgarian: Любенова), also transliterated as Lyubenov/Lyubenova, is a Bulgarian surname. Notable people with the surname include:

- Aleksandar Lyubenov (born 1995), Bulgarian footballer
- Boris Lubenov (born 1947), Bulgarian sprint canoeist
- Lyubomir Lubenov (born 1980), Bulgarian footballer
- Lyubomir Lyubenov (canoeist) (born 1957), Bulgarian sprint canoeist
- Paisiy Lubenov, Bulgarian sprint canoeist
