= Papke =

Papke is a surname. Notable people with the surname include:

- Billy Papke (1886–1936), American boxer
- Paweł Papke (born 1977), Polish volleyball player and politician
- Ulrich Papke (born 1962), East German-German sprint canoeist
