= Kožíšek =

Kožíšek (feminine: Kožíšková) is a Czech surname. Notable people with the surname include:

- Čestmír Kožíšek (born 1991), Czech ski jumper
- Dušan Kožíšek (born 1983), Czech skier
- Karel Kožíšek (born 1977), Czech canoeist
