= Vicol =

Vicol may refer to:

- Maria Vicol (born 1935), Romanian fencer
- Vicol Calabiciov, Romanian sprint canoer
