= Mario Von Appen =

German sprint canoeist (born 1965)

Medal record

Men's canoe sprint

Olympic Games
Gold medal – first place	1992 Barcelona	K-4 1000 m

World Championships
Gold medal – first place	1993 Copenhagen	K-4 1000 m
Gold medal – first place	1993 Copenhagen	K-4 10000 m
Silver medal – second place	1989 Plovdiv	K-4 500 m
Silver medal – second place	1993 Copenhagen	K-4 500 m
Silver medal – second place	1995 Duisburg	K-4 500 m
Bronze medal – third place	1994 Mexico City	K-4 1000 m

Mario von Appen (sometimes listed as Mario Von Appen or Mario van Appen, born 31 July 1965 in Hamburg) is a German sprint canoeist who competed from the late 1980s to the mid-1990s. At the 1992 Summer Olympics in Barcelona, he won a gold medal in the K-4 1000 m event.

Von Appen also won six medals at the ICF Canoe Sprint World Championships with two golds (K-4 1000 m and K-4 10000 m: both 1993), three silvers (K-4 500 m: 1989, 1993, 1995), and a bronze (K-4 1000 m: 1994).
