= Torgeir Toppe =

Norwegian canoeist

Medal record

Men's canoe sprint

World Championships
Bronze medal – third place	1993 Copenhagen	K-2 10000 m

Torgeir Toppe is a Norwegian sprint canoer who competed in the early to mid-1990s. He won a bronze medal in the K-2 10000 m event at the 1993 ICF Canoe Sprint World Championships in Copenhagen.
