= Viktor Dobrotvorskiy =

Ukrainian sprint canoeist (born 1966)

Medal record

Men's canoe sprint

Representing Soviet Union

World Championships
Bronze medal – third place	1990 Poznań	C-2 10000 m

Representing Ukraine

World Championships
Bronze medal – third place	1993 Copenhagen	C-2 10000 m
Bronze medal – third place	1993 Copenhagen	C-4 1000 m

Goodwill Games
Bronze medal – third place	1994 Saint Petersburg	C-2 1000 m

Viktor Dobrotvorskiy (born 4 July 1966 in Vinnytsia, Ukrainian SSR) is a Soviet-born Ukrainian sprint canoer who competed in the early 1990s. He won three bronze medals at the ICF Canoe Sprint World Championships with two in the C-2 10000 m (1990, 1993) and one in the C-4 1000 m (1993) events.
