= Pavel Konovalov (canoeist) =

Russian canoeist (born 1967)

Medal record

Men's canoe sprint

World Championships
Gold medal – first place	1994 Mexico City	C-4 200 m
Silver medal – second place	1993 Copenhagen	C-4 500 m
Silver medal – second place	1993 Copenhagen	C-4 1000 m
Silver medal – second place	1997 Dartmouth	C-2 200 m
Bronze medal – third place	1998 Szeged	C-4 200 m
Bronze medal – third place	1998 Szeged	C-4 500 m

Pavel Anatolyevich Konovalov (Russian: Павел Анатольевич Коновалов) (born January 10, 1967) is a Russian sprint canoeist who competed in the mid-to-late 1990s. He won six medals at the ICF Canoe Sprint World Championships with a gold (C-4 200 m: 1994), three silvers (C-4 200 m: 1997, C-4 500 m: 1993, C-4 1000 m: 1993), and two bronzes (C-4 200 m and C-4 500 m: both 1998).

Konovalov also finished sixth in the C-2 500 m event at the 1996 Summer Olympics in Atlanta.
