= János Sarusi Kis =

Hungarian canoeist (born 1960)

Medal record

Men's canoe sprint

World Championships
Gold medal – first place	1982 Belgrade	C-2 1000 m
Gold medal – first place	1985 Mechelen	C-2 500 m
Gold medal – first place	1986 Montreal	C-2 500 m
Gold medal – first place	1986 Montreal	C-2 1000 m
Silver medal – second place	1982 Belgrade	C-1 500 m
Bronze medal – third place	1981 Nottingham	C-1 500 m

János Sarusi Kis (born 29 June 1960) is a Hungarian sprint canoeist who competed in the 1980s. He won six medals at the ICF Canoe Sprint World Championships with four golds (C-2 500 m: 1985, 1986; C-2 1000 m: 1982, 1986), one silver (C-1 500 m: 1982), and one bronze (C-1 500 m: 1981).

Sarusi Kis also finished sixth in the C-2 500 m event at the 1988 Summer Olympics in Seoul
