= Zsolt Bohács =

Hungarian canoeist (born 1964)

Medal record

Men's canoe sprint

World Championships
Gold medal – first place	1990 Poznań	C-1 10000 m
Gold medal – first place	1991 Paris	C-1 10000 m
Gold medal – first place	1993 Copenhagen	C-1 10000 m
Gold medal – first place	1993 Copenhagen	C-4 1000 m
Gold medal – first place	1994 Amsterdam	C-2 Marathon
Silver medal – second place	1987 Dusiburg	C-1 10000 m
Silver medal – second place	1989 Plovdiv	C-1 10000 m
Silver medal – second place	1990 Poznań	C-4 500 m
Silver medal – second place	1996 Vaxholm	C-2 Marathon

Zsolt Bohács (born 22 March 1964) is a Hungarian sprint canoeist and marathon canoeist who competed from the late 1980s to the mid-1990s. He won seven medals at the ICF Canoe Sprint World Championships with four golds (C-1 10000 m: 1990, 1991, 1993; C-4 1000m: 1993) and three silvers (C-1 10000 m: 1987, 1989; C-4 500 m: 1990), as well as two medals at the Marathon World Championships, one gold (C-2: 1994) and one silver (C-2: 1996).

== Career ==
He was elected as the Member of Parliament for Szeged (Csongrád County Constituency III) as the Fidesz candidate in the 2010 Hungarian parliamentary elections. He became a member of the Constitutional, Judicial and Standing Orders Committee. He was appointed Chairman of the Committee on Sport and Tourism on 1 March 2013. He left Parliament at the 2014 election, as he did not run for re-election and was replaced by Sándor Farkas, who successfully held onto the seat for Fidesz.
