= Sergeiy Liminovich =

Russian canoeist

Medal record

Men's canoe sprint

World Championships
Silver medal – second place	1979 Duisburg	C-1 10000 m
Bronze medal – third place	1981 Nottingham	C-1 10000 m

Sergeiy Liminovich is a Soviet sprint canoer who competed in the late 1970s and early 1980s. He won two medals in the C-1 10000 m at the ICF Canoe Sprint World Championships with a silver in 1979 and a bronze in 1981.
