= Anatoli Reneiski =

Belarusian canoeist

Medal record

Men's canoe sprint

Representing Belarus

World Championships
Gold medal – first place	1997 Dartmouth	C-4 200 m
Silver medal – second place	1998 Szeged	C-4 200 m

Anatoli Iosifavich Reneiski (Belarusian: Анатоль Іо́сіфавіч Рэнейскі; born 6 March 1968 in Babruysk) is a Belarusian sprint canoeist who competed in the late 1990s. He won two medals in the C-4 200 m event at the ICF Canoe Sprint World Championships with a gold in 1997 and a silver in 1998.
