= Nikolay Fedulov =

Medal record

Men's canoe sprint

World Championships
| Silver medal – second place | 1973 Tampere | C-1 500 m |
| Bronze medal – third place | 1970 Copenhagen | C-1 10000 m |

European Championships
| Silver medal – second place | 1969 Moscow | C-1 1000 m |

Nikolay Fedulov (Russian: Николай Федулов; born 30 November 1946 in Novosokolniki) is a Soviet sprint canoer who competed in the early 1970s. He won two medals at the ICF Canoe Sprint World Championships with a silver (C-1 500 m: 1973) and a bronze (C-1 10000 m: 1970).
