= Gheorghe Titu =

Romanian sprint canoer

Medal record

Men's canoe sprint

World Championships
Silver medal – second place	1979 Duisburg	C-2 10000 m
Silver medal – second place	1983 Tampere	C-1 10000 m
Bronze medal – third place	1982 Belgrade	C-1 10000 m

Gheorghe Titu is a Romanian sprint canoer who competed from the late 1970s to the mid-1980s. He won three medals at the ICF Canoe Sprint World Championships with two silvers (C-1 10000 m: 1983, C-2 10000 m: 1979) and a bronze (C-1 10000 m: 1982).
