= Cherasim Munteanu =

Romanian canoeist

Medal record

Men's canoe sprint

World Championships
Silver medal – second place	1973 Tampere	C-2 10000 m
Silver medal – second place	1979 Duisburg	C-2 1000 m
Bronze medal – third place	1974 Mexico City	C-2 1000 m

Cherasim Munteanu is a Romanian sprint canoer who competed in the 1970s. He won three medals at the ICF Canoe Sprint World Championships with two silvers (C-2 10000 m: 1973, 1979) and a bronze (C-2 1000 m: 1974).
