= Roman Dittrich =

Czech sprint canoer

Medal record

Men's canoe sprint

World Championships
Silver medal – second place	1995 Duisburg	C-4 200 m
Bronze medal – third place	1993 Copenhagen	C-4 500 m
Bronze medal – third place	1994 Mexico City	C-4 200 m

Roman Dittrich is a Czech sprint canoeist who competed in the mid-to-late 1990s. He won three medals at the ICF Canoe Sprint World Championships with a silver (C-4 200 m: 1995) and two bronzes (C-4 200 m: 1994; C-4 500 m: 1993).
