= Béla Belicza =

Hungarian canoeist

Medal record

Men's canoe sprint

World Championships
Gold medal – first place	1997 Dartmouth	C-1 200 m
Gold medal – first place	1998 Szeged	C-4 1000 m
Gold medal – first place	2001 Poznań	C-4 1000 m
Silver medal – second place	2001 Poznań	C-4 200 m
Silver medal – second place	1997 Dartmouth	C-1 500 m
Silver medal – second place	1997 Dartmouth	C-4 200 m
Silver medal – second place	2001 Poznań	C-4 500 m
Bronze medal – third place	1997 Dartmouth	C-1 1000 m
Bronze medal – third place	1999 Milan	C-4 1000 m

Béla Belicza is a Hungarian sprint canoeist who competed from 1997 to 2001. Despite not qualifying for Hungary in the Summer Olympics, he won nine medals at the ICF Canoe Sprint World Championships. this included three golds (C-1 200 m: 1997, C-4 200 m: 2001, C-4 1000 m: 1998, ), four silvers (C-1 500 m: 1997, C-4 200 m: 1997, C-4 500 m: 2001), and two bronzes (C-1 1000 m: 1997, C-4 1000 m: 1999.

== Awards ==
- Hungarian canoer of the Year (1): 1997
