= Vasile Serghei =

Romanian sprint canoer

Medal record

Men's canoe sprint

World Championships
Silver medal – second place	1973 Tampere	C-2 10000 m
Bronze medal – third place	1974 Mexico City	C-2 1000 m

Vasile Serghei is a Romanian sprint canoer who competed in the early 1970s. He won two medals at the ICF Canoe Sprint World Championships with a silver (C-2 10000 m: 1973) and a bronze (C-2 1000 m: 1974).
