= Tibor Takács (canoeist) =

Hungarian sprint canoeist

Medal record

Men's canoe sprint

World Championships
Gold medal – first place	1993 Copenhagen	C-4 1000 m
Gold medal – first place	1994 Mexico City	C-4 1000 m

Tibor Takács is a Hungarian sprint canoeist who competed in the mid-1990s. He won two gold medals in the C-4 1000 m event at the ICF Canoe Sprint World Championships, earning them in 1993 and 1994.
