= 2026 ICF Canoe Sprint World Championships – Men's C-1 5000 metres =

Men's C-1 5000 metres at the 2026 ICF Canoe Sprint World Championships
- Location: Poznań, Poland
- Dates: 30 August
- Competitors: 31 from 30 nations
- Winning time: 27:16.73

Medalists
gold medal	Balázs Adolf	Hungary
silver medal	Jaime Duro	Spain
bronze medal	Robin Hirsch	Czech Republic

The men's C-1 5000 metres was held from 30 August 2026 at the 2026 ICF Canoe Sprint World Championships in Poznań, Poland.

31 canoeists entered of which 28 started.

== Schedule ==
The schedule is as follows:

Date	Time	Round
Sunday 30 August 2026	14:40	Final

== Results ==
=== Final ===
As a long-distance event, it was held as a direct final.

Rank	Lane	Athlete	Nation	Time	Behind
1	16	Balázs Adolf	Hungary	27:16.73	
2	15	Jaime Duro	Spain	27:47.15	+30.42
3	23	Robin Hirsch	Czech Republic	28:18.58	+1:01.85
4	9	Ivan Patapenka	Individual Neutral Athletes	28:24.85	+1:08.12
5	18	Wiktor Głazunow	Poland	28:30.89	+1:14.16
6	1	Dmytro Ianchuk	Ukraine	28:46.10	+1:29.37
7	11	Loic Leonard	France	28:51.78	+1:35.05
8	22	Tim Bechtold	Germany	28:56.60	+1:39.87
9	21	Daniel Pacheco	Colombia	29:33.95	+2:17.22
10	14	Carlo Tacchini	Italy	29:47.71	+2:30.98
11	7	Mirjalol Kamilov	Uzbekistan	29:47.99	+2:31.26
12	19	Mateus Nunes Bastos	Brazil	30:10.06	+2:53.33
13	12	Vadim Korobov	Lithuania	30:11.23	+2:54.50
14	13	Jonathan Grady	United States	30:28.16	+3:11.43
15	27	William Figueroa del Aguila	Peru	30:46.73	+3:30.00
16	10	Shuhei Hosumi	Japan	30:59.33	+3:42.60
17	31	Gyaneshwor Singh Philem	India	30:59.99	+3:43.26
18	8	Nikita Ciudin	Canada	31:14.64	+3:57.91
19	20	Ilya Pervukhin	Individual Neutral Athletes	31:19.59	+4:02.86
20	28	Admilson André Batista De Sousa	São Tomé and Príncipe	31:32.54	+4:15.81
21	24	Manuel Antonio	Angola	32:02.72	+4:45.99
22	25	Zhang Liwen	China	32:31.83	+5:15.10
23	5	Isyaka Ibrahim	Nigeria		+1 LAP
24	3	Mohamed Ali Merzougui	Algeria		+2 LAP
25	29	Ibrahima Seck	Senegal		+3 LAP
26	4	Mohamed Ali Hmida	Tunisia		+4 LAP
	17	Stanislavs Lescinskis	Latvia	DNF	
	26	Serghei Tarnovschi	Moldova	DSQ	
	6	Amirjon Bobojonov	Tajikistan	DNS	
	30	Mohamed Gouda	Egypt	DNS	
	2	Joaquim Lobo	Mozambique	DNS	
