= Petre Maxim =

Romanian canoeist

Medal record

Men's canoe sprint

World Championships
Gold medal – first place	1966 East Berlin	C-2 10000 m
Gold medal – first place	1970 Copenhagen	C-2 10000 m

Petre Maxim is a Romanian sprint canoeist who competed in the late 1960s and early 1970s. He won two gold medals in the C-2 10000 m event at the ICF Canoe Sprint World Championships, earning them in 1966 and 1970.
