= Mikhail Vartolemei =

Romanian sprint canoer

Medal record

Men's canoe sprint

World Championships
Gold medal – first place	2001 Poznań	C-4 500 m
Gold medal – first place	2002 Seville	C-4 500 m
Silver medal – second place	2001 Poznań	C-2 200 m
Bronze medal – third place	2001 Poznań	C-4 1000 m
Bronze medal – third place	2002 Seville	C-2 200 m
Bronze medal – third place	2002 Seville	C-4 200 m

Mihail Vartolemei is a Romanian sprint canoer who competed in the late 1990s and early 2000s. He won six medals at the ICF Canoe Sprint World Championships with two gold (C-4 500 m: 2001, 2002), a silver (C-2 200 m: 2001), and three bronzes (C-2 200 m: 2002, C-4 200 m: 2002, C-4 1000 m: 2001).
