= Gábor Haraszti =

Hungarian canoeist

Medal record

Men's canoe sprint

World Championships
| Silver medal – second place | 1974 Mexico City | C-2 10000 m |
| Bronze medal – third place | 1973 Tampere | C-2 10000 m |

Gábor Haraszti is a Hungarian sprint canoer who competed in the early 1970s. He won two medals in the C-2 10000 m event at the ICF Canoe Sprint World Championships with a silver in 1974 and a bronze in 1973.
