= Dumitru Bețiu =

Romanian canoeist

Medal record

Men's canoe sprint

World Championships
Silver medal – second place	1986 Montreal	C-2 10000 m
Bronze medal – third place	1983 Tampere	C-2 500 m

Dumitru Beţiu (born 1958) is a Romanian sprint canoer who competed in the mid to late 1980s. He won two medals at the ICF Canoe Sprint World Championships with a silver (C-2 10000 m: 1986) and a bronze (C-2 500 m: 1983).
