= Sylvain Hoyer =

French canoeist

Medal record

Men's canoe sprint

World Championships
| Bronze medal – third place | 1994 Mexico City | C-2 200 m |
| Bronze medal – third place | 1995 Duisburg | C-4 200 m |
| Bronze medal – third place | 1999 Milan | C-4 500 m |

Sylvain Hoyer is a French sprint canoer who competed in the mid to late 1990s. He won three bronze medals at the ICF Canoe Sprint World Championships (C-2 200 m: 1994, C-4 200 m: 1995, C-4 500 m: 1999).
