= Sergey Ossadzhiy =

Medal record

Men's canoe sprint

World Championships
Silver medal – second place	1983 Tampere	C-2 500 m
Bronze medal – third place	1993 Copenhagen	C-4 1000 m

Sergey Ossadzhiy is a Soviet sprint canoer who competed in the early 1980s. He won a silver medal in the C-2 500 m event at the 1983 ICF Canoe Sprint World Championships in Tampere and a bronze medal in the C-4 1000 m event at the 1993 ICF Canoe Sprint World Championships in Copenhagen.
