= 1993 ICF Canoe Sprint World Championships =

International canoe competition

- Host city: Copenhagen, Denmark

The 1993 ICF Canoe Sprint World Championships were held in Copenhagen, Denmark for the third time. The Danish city had hosted the event previously in 1950 and 1970.

The men's competition consisted of eight Canadian (single paddle, open boat) and nine kayak events. Five events were held for the women, all in kayak. This was the first championship following the breakup of the Soviet Union in 1991 and the first since Czechoslovakia broke up into the Czech Republic and Slovakia in early 1993.

This was the 25th championships in canoe sprint.

== Medal summary ==
=== Men's ===
==== Canoe ====
Event	Gold	Time	Silver	Time	Bronze	Time
C-1 500 m	Nikolay Bukhalov (BUL)		György Kolonics (HUN)		Steve Giles (CAN)	
C-1 1000 m	Ivan Klementiev (LAT)		Victor Partnoi (ROU)		Matthias Röder (GER)	
C-1 10000 m	Zsolt Bohács (HUN)		Pavel Bednář (CZE)		Andreas Dittmer (GER)	
C-2 500 m	Hungary; György Kolonics; Csaba Horváth		Denmark; Christian Frederiksen; Arne Nielsson		Germany; Andreas Dittmer; Gunar Kirchbach	
C-2 1000 m	Denmark; Christian Frederiksen; Arne Nielsson		France; Olivier Boldin; Didier Hoyer		Germany; Ulrich Papke; Ingo Spelly	
C-2 10000 m	Denmark; Christian Frederiksen; Arne Nielsson		Great Britain; Andrew Train; Stephen Train		Ukraine; Andrey Balabanov; Viktor Dobrotvorskiy	
C-4 500 m	Hungary; Ervin Hoffman; Attila Szabó; Gáspár Boldiszár; Ferenc Novák		Russia; Andrey Kabanov; Sergey Chemerov; Pavel Konovalov; Aleksandr Kostoglod		Czech Republic; Petr Procházka; Roman Dittrich; Waldemar Fibgir; Tomáš Křivánek	
C-4 1000 m	Hungary; Imre Pulai; György Kolonics; Tibor Takács; Csaba Horváth		Russia; Andrey Kabanov; Sergey Chemerov; Pavel Konovalov; Aleksandr Kostoglod		Ukraine; Viktor Dobrotvorskiy; Sergey Osadtchiy; Andrey Balabanov; Oleksandr Kalynychenko	

==== Kayak ====
Event	Gold	Time	Silver	Time	Bronze	Time
K-1 500 m	Mirko Kolehmainen (FIN)		Renn Crichlow (CAN)		Daniel Collins (AUS)	
K-1 1000 m	Knut Holmann (NOR)		Thor Nielsen (DEN)		Marin Popescu (ROU)	
K-1 10000 m	Thor Nielsen (DEN)		Knut Holmann (NOR)		Attila Szabó (SVK)	
K-2 500 m	Germany; Kay Bluhm; Torsten Guitsche		Poland; Maicej Freimut; Wojciech Kurpiewski		Spain; José Manuel Sánchez; Juan José Roman	
K-2 1000 m	Germany; Kay Bluhm; Torsten Guitsche		Italy; Antonio Rossi; Daniele Scarpa		Sweden; Gunnar Olsson; Kalle Sundqvist	
K-2 10000 m	Hungary; Zsolt Borhi; Attila Ábrahám		Sweden; Gunnar Olsson; Kalle Sundqvist		Norway; Torgeir Toppe; Peter Ribe	
K-4 500 m	Russia; Viktor Denisov; Anatoly Tishchenko; Aleksandr Ivanik; Oleg Gorobiy		Germany; Thomas Reineck; Oliver Kegel; André Wohllebe; Mario von Appen		Hungary; Zsolt Gyulay; Vince Fehérvári; Gábor Horváth; Attila Ábrahám	
K-4 1000 m	Germany; Thomas Reineck; Oliver Kegel; André Wohllebe; Mario von Appen		Hungary; Zsolt Gyulay; Zsolt Borhi; Gábor Horváth; Attila Ábrahám		Russia; Viktor Denisov; Anatoliy Tischenko; Aleksandr Ivanik; Oleg Gorobiy	
K-4 10000 m	Germany; Thomas Reineck; Oliver Kegel; André Wohllebe; Mario von Appen		Poland; Andrzej Gryczko; Piotr Markiewicz; Maciej Freimut; Grzegorz Kaleta		Russia; Sergey Verlin; Vladimir Bobreshov; Georgiy Tsybulnikov; Sergey Gaikov	

=== Women's ===
==== Kayak ====
Event	Gold	Time	Silver	Time	Bronze	Time
K-1 500 m	Birgit Schmidt (GER)		Anna Olsson (SWE)		Caroline Brunet (CAN)	
K-1 5000 m	Susanne Gunnarsson (SWE)		Rita Kőbán (HUN)		Birgit Schmidt (GER)	
K-2 500 m	Sweden; Agneta Andersson; Anna Olsson		Hungary; Kinga Czigány; Szilvia Mednyánszky		Germany; Ramona Portwich; Anett Shuck	
K-2 5000 m	Germany; Ramona Portwich; Anett Schuck		Hungary; Éva Dónusz; Erika Mészáros		Romania; Carmen Simion; Sanda Toma	
K-4 500 m	Germany; Birgit Schmidt; Ramona Portwich; Anett Schuck; Daniela Gleue		Sweden; Agneta Andersson; Anna Olsson; Maria Haglund; Susanne Rosenqvist		Hungary; Kinga Czigány; Éva Dónusz; Rita Kőbán; Erika Mészáros	

== Medals table ==
Rank	Nation	Gold	Silver	Bronze	Total
1	Germany	7	1	6	14
2	Hungary	5	5	2	12
3	Denmark	3	2	0	5
4	Sweden	2	3	1	6
5	Russia	1	2	2	5
6	Norway	1	1	1	3
7	Bulgaria	1	0	0	1
7	Finland	1	0	0	1
7	Latvia	1	0	0	1
10	Poland	0	2	0	2
11	Canada	0	1	2	3
11	Romania	0	1	2	3
13	Czech Republic	0	1	1	2
14	France	0	1	0	1
14	Great Britain	0	1	0	1
14	Italy	0	1	0	1
17	Ukraine	0	0	2	2
18	Australia	0	0	1	1
18	Slovakia	0	0	1	1
18	Spain	0	0	1	1
Totals (20 entries)		22	22	22	66
