= Yuriy Laptikov =

Medal record

Men's canoe sprint

World Championships
Silver medal – second place	1982 Belgrade	C-2 500 m
Bronze medal – third place	1983 Tampere	C-2 10000 m

Yuriy Laptikov is a Soviet sprint canoer who competed in the early 1980s. He won two medals at the ICF Canoe Sprint World Championships with a silver (C-2 500 m: 1982) and a bronze (C-2 10000 m: 1983).
