= Tomáš Křivánek =

Czechoslovak-Czech sprint canoeist (born 1966)

Medal record

Men's canoe sprint

World Championships
Gold medal – first place	1998 Szeged	C-4 200 m
Silver medal – second place	1995 Duisburg	C-4 200 m
Bronze medal – third place	1993 Copenhagen	C-4 500 m
Bronze medal – third place	1994 Mexico City	C-4 200 m
Bronze medal – third place	1997 Dartmouth	C-4 200 m

Tomáš Křivánek (born January 10, 1966) is a Czechoslovak-Czech sprint canoeist who competed from the late 1980s to the late 1990s. He won five medals at the ICF Canoe Sprint World Championships with a gold (C-4 200 m: 1998), a silver (C-4 200 m: 1995) and three bronzes (C-4 200 m: 1994, 1997; C-4 500 m: 1993).

Křivánek also competed in the C-2 1000 m event at the 1988 Summer Olympics in Seoul, but was eliminated in the semifinal round.
