= Alexandru Dumitrescu =

Romanian sprint canoeist (born 1988)

Personal information
- Full name: Liviu Alexandru Dumitrescu Lazar
- Born: 10 May 1988 (age 38) Ploieşti, Romania
- Height: 175 cm (5 ft 9 in)
- Weight: 75 kg (165 lb)
Medal record
World Championships
Gold medal – first place	2010 Poznań	C-2 500 m
Gold medal – first place	2010 Poznań	C-2 1000 m
Gold medal – first place	2011 Szeged	C-2 500 m
Gold medal – first place	2014 Moscow	C-2 1000 m
Silver medal – second place	2014 Moscow	C-2 500 m
Bronze medal – third place	2011 Szeged	C-2 1000 m
European Championships
Gold medal – first place	2010 Trasona	C-2 500 m
Gold medal – first place	2011 Belgrade	C-2 500 m
Gold medal – first place	2012 Zagreb	C-2 1000 m
Silver medal – second place	2012 Zagreb	C-2 500 m
Silver medal – second place	2013 Montemor-o-Velho	C-2 500 m
Silver medal – second place	2014 Brandenburg	C-2 500 m
Bronze medal – third place	2010 Trasona	C-2 1000 m
Bronze medal – third place	2011 Belgrade	C-2 1000 m
Bronze medal – third place	2013 Montemor-o-Velho	C-2 1000 m
Bronze medal – third place	2014 Brandenburg	C-2 200 m

Liviu Alexandru Dumitrescu Lazar (born 10 May 1988 in Ploieşti) is a Romanian sprint canoeist who has competed since the late 2000s. He won two gold medals at the 2010 ICF Canoe Sprint World Championships in Poznań, earning them in the C-2 500 m and C-2 1000 m events. He has since won two more, in the C-2 500 m in 2011 and the C-2 1000 m in 2014.
