= Olivier Boivin =

French sprint canoer

Medal record

Men's canoe sprint

Olympic Games
| Bronze medal – third place | 1992 Barcelona | C-2 1000 m |

World Championships
| Silver medal – second place | 1989 Plovdiv | C-2 1000 m |
| Silver medal – second place | 1989 Plovdiv | C-2 10000 m |
| Silver medal – second place | 1991 Paris | C-2 1000 m |
| Silver medal – second place | 1993 Copenhagen | C-2 1000 m |
| Bronze medal – third place | 1991 Paris | C-2 500 m |
| Bronze medal – third place | 1994 Mexico City | C-2 200 m |
| Bronze medal – third place | 1995 Duisburg | C-4 200 m |

Olivier Boivin (born June 6, 1965) is a French sprint canoer.

== Career ==
Boivin competed from the late 1980s to the mid-1990s.

He won a bronze medal in the C-2 1000 m event at the 1992 Summer Olympics in Barcelona. He also won seven medals at the ICF Canoe Sprint World Championships with four silvers (C-2 1000 m: 1989, 1991, 1993; C-2 10000 m: 1989) and three bronzes (C-2 200 m: 1994, C-2 500 m: 1991, C-4 200 m: 1995).
