= Gáspár Boldizsár =

Hungarian canoeist

Medal record

Men's canoe sprint

World Championships
Gold medal – first place	1993 Copenhagen	C-4 500 m
Gold medal – first place	1994 Copenhagen	C-4 500 m
Silver medal – second place	1990 Poznań	C-4 1000 m
Silver medal – second place	1994 Mexico City	C-2 1000 m
Silver medal – second place	1995 Duisburg	C-4 1000 m
Bronze medal – third place	1989 Plovdiv	C-1 1000 m

Gáspár Boldizsár is a Hungarian sprint canoer who competed from 1989 to 1995. He won six medals at the ICF Canoe Sprint World Championships with two golds (C-4 500 m: 1993, 1994), three silvers (C-2 1000 m: 1994, C-4 1000 m: 1990, 1990), and one bronze (C-1 1000 m: 1989).
