= Benoît Bernard =

French canoeist

Medal record

Men's canoe sprint

World Championships
Silver medal – second place	1991 Paris	C-4 500 m
Bronze medal – third place	1989 Plovdiv	C-4 500 m
Bronze medal – third place	1995 Dusiburg	C-4 200 m

Benoît Bernard (born 17 October 1969) is a French sprint canoer who competed from the late 1980s to the mid-1990s.

Bernard won three medals at the ICF Canoe Sprint World Championships with a silver (C-4 500 m: 1991) and two bronzes (C-4 200 m: 1995, C-4 500 m: 1989).

In 2009, he signed a petition in support of Roman Polanski, calling for his release after Polanski was arrested in Switzerland in connection with a 1977 charge of drugging and raping a 13-year-old girl.
