= Vladimir Ladosha =

Russian canoeist

Medal record

Men's canoe sprint

World Championships
| Gold medal – first place | 1999 Milan | C-4 200 m |
| Gold medal – first place | 1999 Milan | C-4 500 m |
| Silver medal – second place | 1997 Dartmouth | C-2 200 m |
| Bronze medal – third place | 1998 Szeged | C-4 200 m |
| Bronze medal – third place | 1998 Szeged | C-4 500 m |
| Bronze medal – third place | 2001 Poznań | C-4 500 m |

Vladimir Ladosha, Rus. Владимир Ладоша, is a Russian sprint canoeist who competed in the late 1990s. He won six medals at the ICF Canoe Sprint World Championships with two golds (C-4 200 m and C-4 500 m: both 1999), a silver (C-2 200 m: 1997), and three bronzes (C-4 200 m: 1998, C-4 500 m: 1998, 2001).
