= Silviu Simoncenco =

Romanian canoeist

Medal record

Men's canoe sprint

World Championships
Gold medal – first place	2007 Duisburg	C-4 1000 m

Silviu Simoncenco is a Romanian sprint canoer who has competed since 2007. He won a gold medal in the C-4 1000 m event at the 2007 ICF Canoe Sprint World Championships in Duisburg.
