= Anatoliy Volkov =

Medal record

Men's canoe sprint

World Championships
Silver medal – second place	1985 Mechelen	C-1 500 m
Bronze medal – third place	1983 Tampere	C-1 500 m

Anatoliy Volkov is a Soviet sprint canoer who competed in the mid-1980s. He won two medals in the C-1 500 m event at the ICF Canoe Sprint World Championships with a silver in 1985 and a bronze in 1983.
