= Sergey Chemerov =

Russian sprint canoeist

Medal record

Men's canoe sprint

World Championships
Gold medal – first place	1994 Mexico City	C-4 200 m
Silver medal – second place	1993 Copenhagen	C-4 500 m
Silver medal – second place	1993 Copenhagen	C-4 1000 m
Bronze medal – third place	1997 Dartmouth	C-4 500 m

Sergey Chemerov is a Russian sprint canoeist who competed in the mid to late 1990s. He won four medals at the ICF Canoe Sprint World Championships with a gold (C-4 200 m: 1994), two silvers (C-4 500 m and C-4 1000 m: both 1993), and a bronze (C-4 500 m: 1997).
