= Dávid Korisánszky =

Hungarian canoeist

Personal information
- Nationality: Hungarian
- Born: 10 February 1993 (age 33)

Sport
- Country: Hungary
- Sport: Canoe sprint
Medal record
World Championships
| Bronze medal – third place | 2021 Copenhagen | Mixed C-2 200 m |

Dávid Korisánszky (born 10 February 1993) is a Hungarian sprint canoeist.

He competed at the 2021 ICF Canoe Sprint World Championships, winning a bronze medal in the mixed C-2 200 distance.
