= Valeriy Veshko =

Soviet sprint canoeist

Personal information
- Born: 2 January 1966 (age 60) Volochysk, Ukrainian SSR, Soviet Union

Sport
- Sport: Canoe sprint
Medal record
Representing Soviet Union
World Championships
Gold medal – first place	1987 Duisburg	C-2 1000 m
Gold medal – first place	1989 Plovdiv	C-4 500 m
Gold medal – first place	1989 Plovdiv	C-4 1000 m
Gold medal – first place	1990 Poznań	C-4 500 m
Gold medal – first place	1990 Poznań	C-4 1000 m
Gold medal – first place	1991 Paris	C-4 500 m
Gold medal – first place	1991 Paris	C-4 1000 m
Silver medal – second place	1987 Duisburg	C-2 500 m
Bronze medal – third place	1989 Plovdiv	C-2 1000 m
Summer Universiade
Gold medal – first place	1987 Zagreb	C-2 500 m
Gold medal – first place	1987 Zagreb	C-2 1000 m

Valeriy Veshko (born 2 January 1966) is a Soviet sprint canoeist who competed from the late 1980s to the early 1990s. He won nine medals at the ICF Canoe Sprint World Championships with seven golds (C-2 1000 m: 1987, C-4 500 m: 1989, 1990, 1991; C-4 1000 m: 1989, 1990, 1991), one silver (C-2 500 m: 1987), and one bronze (C-2 1000 m: 1989).
