= Paweł Skowroński =

Polish sprint canoer

Medal record

Men's canoe sprint
Event	1st	2nd	3rd
Olympic Games	0	0	0
World Championships	0	1	1
European Championships	0	2	1
European Games	0	0	0
Total	0	3	2

World Championships
Silver medal – second place	2006 Szeged	C-4 500 m
Bronze medal – third place	2010 Poznań	C-2 200 m

European Championships
Silver medal – second place	2007 Pontevedra	C4-500 m
Silver medal – second place	2009 Brandenburg	C2-500 m
Bronze medal – third place	2005 Poznań	C2-1000m

Paweł Skowroński is a Polish sprint canoer who has competed since the late 2000s. He won two medals at the ICF Canoe Sprint World Championships with a silver (C-4 500 m: 2006) and a bronze (C-2 200 m: 2010).
