= Aleksandr Artemida =

Russian sprint canoeist

Medal record

Men's canoe sprint

World Championships
Gold medal – first place	1999 Milan	C-2 200 m
Silver medal – second place	2002 Seville	C-4 500 m

Aleksandr Artemida is a Russian sprint canoeist who competed in the late 1990s and early first decade of the 21st century. He won two medals at the ICF Canoe Sprint World Championships with a gold (C-2 200 m: 1999) and a silver (C-4 500 m: 2002).
