= Andrey Kabanov =

Russian canoeist

Medal record

Men's canoe sprint

World Championships
Gold medal – first place	1994 Mexico City	C-4 200 m
Gold medal – first place	1999 Milan	C-4 200 m
Gold medal – first place	1999 Milan	C-4 500 m
Gold medal – first place	1999 Milan	C-4 1000 m
Silver medal – second place	1993 Copenhagen	C-4 500 m
Silver medal – second place	1993 Copenhagen	C-4 1000 m
Silver medal – second place	1998 Szeged	C-4 1000 m
Silver medal – second place	2002 Seville	C-4 500 m
Bronze medal – third place	1998 Szeged	C-2 200 m

Andrey Kabanov (born August 9, 1971) is a Russian sprint canoeist who competed in the mid -1990s to the early 2000s (decade). He won nine medals at the ICF Canoe Sprint World Championships with four golds (C-4 200 m: 1994, 1999; C-4 500 m: 1999, C-4 1000 m: 1999), four silvers (C-4 500 m: 1993, 2002; C-4 1000 m: 1993, 1998), and a bronze (C-2 200 m: 1998).

Kabanov also finished sixth in the C-2 500 m event at the 1996 Summer Olympics in Atlanta.
