= 1990 ICF Canoe Sprint World Championships =

International sporting competition

- Host city: Poznań, Poland on Lake Malta

The 1990 ICF Canoe Sprint World Championships were held in Poznań, Poland, on Lake Malta.

The men's competition consisted of eight Canadian (single paddle, open boat) and nine kayak events. Five events were held for the women, all in kayak.

This was the 23rd championships in the canoe sprint.

== Medal summary ==
=== Men's ===
==== Canoe ====
Event	Gold	Time	Silver	Time	Bronze	Time
C-1 500 m	Michał Śliwiński (URS)		Thomas Zereske (GDR)		Martin Marinov (BUL)	
C-1 1000 m	Ivan Klementiev (URS)		György Zala (HUN)		Thomas Zereske (GDR)	
C-1 10000 m	Zsolt Bohács (HUN)		Jan Bartůněk (TCH)		Ivan Klementiev (URS)	
C-2 500 m	Soviet Union; Viktor Reneisky; Nicolae Juravschi		East Germany; Ulrich Papke; Ingo Spelly		Hungary; Attila Pálizs; György Zala	
C-2 1000 m	East Germany; Ulrich Papke; Ingo Spelly		Romania; Gheorghe Andriev; Vasile Lehaci		Soviet Union; Aleksandr Gramovich; Yuriy Gurin	
C-2 10000 m	Denmark; Arne Nielsson; Christian Frederiksen		Romania; Gheorghe Andriev; Vasile Lehaci		Soviet Union; Andrey Balabanov; Viktor Dobrotvorskiy	
C-4 500 m	Soviet Union; Viktor Reneisky; Nicolae Juravschi; Yuriy Gurin; Valeriy Veshko		Hungary; Zsolt Bohács; Ervin Hoffmann; Gusztáv Leikep; Attila Szabó		Bulgaria; Nikolay Bukhalov; Traicho Draganov; Paisiy Lubenov; Dejan Slavov	
C-4 1000 m	Soviet Union; Yuriy Gurin; Nicolae Juravschi; Viktor Reneisky; Valeriy Veshko		Hungary; Gáspár Boldizsár; Ervin Hoffmann; Gusztáv Leikep; Attila Szabó		Bulgaria; Nikolay Bukhalov; Traicho Draganov; Paisiy Lubenov; Dejan Slavov	

==== Kayak ====
Event	Gold	Time	Silver	Time	Bronze	Time
K-1 500 m	Sergey Kalesnik (URS)		Mike Herbert (USA)		Martin Hunter (AUS)	
K-1 1000 m	Knut Holmann (NOR)		Maicej Freimut (POL)		Philippe Boccara (FRA)	
K-1 10000 m	Philippe Boccara (FRA)		Greg Barton (USA)		Torsten Krentz (GDR)	
K-2 500 m	Soviet Union; Sergey Kalesnik; Anatoly Tishchenko		United States; Mike Herbert; Terry Kent		East Germany; Kay Bluhm; Torsten Guitsche	
K-2 1000 m	East Germany; Kay Bluhm; Torsten Guitsche		Soviet Union; Vladimir Bobrezhov; Artūras Vieta		Hungary; Gábor Szabó; Béla Petrovics	
K-2 10000 m	Great Britain; Grayson Bourne; Ivan Lawler		New Zealand; Ian Ferguson; Paul MacDonald		Soviet Union; Boris Danilov; Vladimir Mozeiko	
K-4 500 m	Soviet Union; Oleg Gorobiy; Sergey Kirsanov; Aleksandr Matushenko; Viktor Pusev		East Germany; Matthias Hoppe; Uwe Münch; Andreas Stähle; André Wohllebe		Hungary; Attila Ábrahám; Ferenc Cspies; Gyula Kajner; Béla Petrovics	
K-4 1000 m	Hungary; Attila Ábrahám; Ferenc Cspies; László Fidel; Zsolt Gyulay		Soviet Union; Sergey Kalesnik; Sergey Krisanov; Aleksandr Matushenko; Anatoly Tishchenko		East Germany; Kay Bluhm; Torsten Guitsche; Tostern Krentz; André Wohllebe	
K-4 10000 m	Soviet Union; Dmitry Bankovsky; Vladimir Bobreshov; Aleksandr Myzgin; Artūras Vieta		Poland; Andrzej Gajewski; Andrzej Gryczko; Grzegorz Kaleta; Mariusz Rutkowski		Sweden; Gunar Olsson; Hans Olsson; Peter Orbanm; Kalle Sundqvist	

=== Women's ===
==== Kayak ====
Event	Gold	Time	Silver	Time	Bronze	Time
K-1 500 m	Josefa Idem (ITA)		Yvonne Knudsen (DEN)		Katrin Borchert (FRG)	
K-1 5000 m	Katrin Borchert (FRG)		Josefa Idem (ITA)		Irina Salomykova (URS)	
K-2 500 m	East Germany; Ramona Portwich; Anke von Seck		Hungary; Éva Dónusz; Erika Mészáros		West Germany; Katrin Borchert; Monika Bunke	
K-2 5000 m	East Germany; Ramona Portwich; Anke von Seck		Hungary; Éva Dónusz; Erika Mészáros		Soviet Union; Katarin Koniovskala; Nelly Korbukova	
K-4 500 m	East Germany; Silke Bull; Ramona Portwich; Heike Rabenow; Anke von Seck		Hungary; Éva Dónusz; Henriette Huber; Rita Kőbán; Erika Mészáros		West Germany; Marcella Bednar; Katrin Borchert; Monika Bunke; Catrin Fischer	

== Medals table ==
Rank	Nation	Gold	Silver	Bronze	Total
1	Soviet Union	9	2	6	17
2	East Germany	5	3	4	12
3	Hungary	2	6	3	11
4	Denmark	1	1	0	2
4	Italy	1	1	0	2
6	West Germany	1	0	3	4
7	France	1	0	1	2
8	Great Britain	1	0	0	1
8	Norway	1	0	0	1
10	United States	0	3	0	3
11	Poland	0	2	0	2
11	Romania	0	2	0	2
13	Czechoslovakia	0	1	0	1
13	New Zealand	0	1	0	1
15	Bulgaria	0	0	3	3
16	Australia	0	0	1	1
16	Sweden	0	0	1	1
Totals (17 entries)		22	22	22	66
