= Didier Hoyer =

French canoeist (born 1961)

Medal record

Men's canoe sprint

Olympic Games
Bronze medal – third place	1984 Los Angeles	C-2 1000 m
Bronze medal – third place	1992 Barcelona	C-2 1000 m

World Championships
Silver medal – second place	1989 Plovdiv	C-2 1000 m
Silver medal – second place	1989 Plovdiv	C-2 10000 m
Silver medal – second place	1991 Paris	C-2 1000 m
Silver medal – second place	1993 Copenhagen	C-2 1000 m
Bronze medal – third place	1986 Montreal	C-1 10000 m
Bronze medal – third place	1991 Paris	C-2 500 m

Didier Hoyer (born 3 February 1961) is a French sprint canoer who competed from the early 1980s to the early 1990s. Competing in three Summer Olympics, he won two bronze medals in the C-2 1000 m event, earning them in 1984 and 1992.

Hoyer also won six medals at the ICF Canoe Sprint World Championships with four silvers (C-2 1000 m: 1989, 1991, 1993; C-2 10000 m: 1989) and two bronzes (C-1 10000 m: 1986, C-2 500 m: 1991).
