= Dimitri Joukovski =

Canadian canoeist

Medal record

Men's canoe sprint

World Championships
Silver medal – second place	2002 Seville	C-4 1000 m
Silver medal – second place	2003 Gainesville	C-4 1000 m
Silver medal – second place	2006 Szeged	C-4 1000 m

Dimitri Joukovski is a Canadian sprint canoer who competed in the early to mid-2000s. He won three silver medals in the C-4 1000 m event at the ICF Canoe Sprint World Championships earning them in 2002, 2003, and 2006.
