= Attila Szabó (Hungarian canoeist) =

Hungarian canoeist

Medal record

Men's canoe sprint

World Championships
| Gold medal – first place | 1991 Paris | C-2 500 m |
| Gold medal – first place | 1993 Copenhagen | C-4 500 m |
| Gold medal – first place | 1994 Mexico City | C-4 500 m |
| Gold medal – first place | 1995 Duisburg | C-4 200 m |
| Gold medal – first place | 1995 Duisburg | C-4 500 m |
| Silver medal – second place | 1989 Plovdiv | C-4 500 m |
| Silver medal – second place | 1989 Plovdiv | C-4 1000 m |
| Silver medal – second place | 1990 Poznań | C-4 500 m |
| Silver medal – second place | 1990 Poznań | C-4 1000 m |
| Silver medal – second place | 1994 Mexico City | C-4 200 m |
| Bronze medal – third place | 1987 Duisburg | C-1 500 m |

Attila Szabó (born 3 May 1963) is a Hungarian sprint canoeist who competed from 1987 to 1995. He won eleven medals at the ICF Canoe Sprint World Championships with five golds (C-2 500 m: 1991, C-4 200 m: 1995, C-4 500 m: 1993, 1994, 1995), five silvers (C-4 200 m: 1994, C-4 500 m: 1989, 1990; C-4 1000 m: 1989, 1990), and one bronze (C-1 500 m: 1987).

Szabó also finished fourth in the C-1 500 m event at the 1988 Summer Olympics in Seoul.
