= Thomas Zereske =

German canoeist

Medal record

Men's canoe sprint

World Championships
Gold medal – first place	1997 Dartmouth	C-2 200 m
Gold medal – first place	1998 Szeged	C-2 200 m
Silver medal – second place	1990 Poznań	C-1 500 m
Silver medal – second place	1995 Duisburg	C-1 200 m
Silver medal – second place	1995 Duisburg	C-2 200 m
Bronze medal – third place	1990 Poznań	C-1 1000 m
Bronze medal – third place	1991 Paris	C-4 500 m
Bronze medal – third place	1997 Dartmouth	C-2 500 m
Bronze medal – third place	1998 Szeged	C-2 500 m
Bronze medal – third place	1999 Milan	C-2 200 m

Thomas Zereske (22 May 1966 – 28 June 2004) was a German, originally East German, former sprint canoeist who competed from 1988 to 2000.

== Sporting career ==
Zereske won ten medals at the ICF Canoe Sprint World Championships with two gold medals (C-2 200 m: 1997, 1998), three silver medals (C-1 200 m: 1995, C-1 500 m: 1990, C-2 200 m: 1990), and five bronze medals (C-1 1000 m: 1990, C-2 200 m: 1999, C-2 500 m: 1997, 1998; C-4 500 m: 1991).

Competing in three Summer Olympics, Zereske earned his best finish of fifth place three times (C-1 500 m: 1996 for Germany, C-2 500 m: 1988 for East Germany, 2000 for Germany).

As the German national championships, Zereske won two C-1 200 m, three C-2 200 m, and four C-4 200 m titles. He also won national championship in C-1 500 m three times and C-1 10000 m once. Zereske earned a German national championship in the C-2 500 m event in 1997.

== Coaching career ==
After Zereske retired from canoeing, he became a coach of the German Dragon Boat racing national team. As a coach, his teams won a complete set of medals in 2002 with a gold in the women's 500 m, a silver in the men's 500 m, and a bronze in the men's 250 m; and two silver medals in 2003. The 2003 silvers were in the men's 500 m and women's 500 m events.

== Death ==
A native of Neubrandenburg, Zereske died of leukemia in 2004. Zereske had only been diagnosed with leukemia five days prior to his death. His former canoeing partner Christian Gille wore a black armband in honor of Zereske during the 2004 Summer Olympic sprint canoeing events. After Gille and his current teammate won the gold in the C-2 1000 m event at those games, Gille dedicated the medal to his fallen teammate.
