= Oleksandr Kalynychenko =

Soviet canoeist

Personal information
- Born: 18 May 1966 Fastiv, Soviet Union
- Died: 30 November 2023 (aged 57) Zaporizhzhia, Ukraine

Sport
- Sport: Canoe sprint
Medal record
Representing Soviet Union
World Championships
Silver medal – second place	1986 Montreal	C-2 500 m
Summer Universiade
Silver medal – second place	1987 Zagreb	C-1 500 m
Silver medal – second place	1987 Zagreb	C-1 1000 m
Representing Ukraine
World Championships
Bronze medal – third place	1993 Copenhagen	C-4 1000 m

Oleksandr Kalynychenko (18 May 1966 – 30 November 2023) was a Soviet and Ukrainian sprint canoer who competed in the early 1980s. He won a silver medal in the C-2 500 m event at the 1986 ICF Canoe Sprint World Championships in Montreal. He won a bronze medal in the C-4 1000 m event at the 1993 ICF Canoe Sprint World Championships in Copenhagen. Since 2022, a participant in the Russo-Ukrainian War, during which he died.
