= Ervin Hoffmann =

Hungarian canoeist

Medal record

Men's canoe sprint

World Championships
Gold medal – first place	1993 Copenhagen	C-4 500 m
Gold medal – first place	1994 Mexico City	C-4 500 m
Gold medal – first place	1995 Duisburg	C-4 200 m
Gold medal – first place	1995 Duisburg	C-4 500 m
Silver medal – second place	1989 Plovdiv	C-4 500 m
Silver medal – second place	1989 Plovdiv	C-4 1000 m
Silver medal – second place	1990 Poznań	C-4 500 m
Silver medal – second place	1990 Poznań	C-4 1000 m
Silver medal – second place	1994 Mexico City	C-1 200 m
Silver medal – second place	1994 Mexico City	C-4 200 m
Silver medal – second place	1997 Dartmouth	C-4 200 m

Ervin Hoffmann is a Hungarian sprint canoeist who competed from the late 1980s to the late 1990s. He won 11 medals at the ICF Canoe Sprint World Championships with four golds (C-4 200 m: 1995, C-4 500 m: 1993, 1994, 1995) and seven silvers (C-1 200 m: 1994, C-4 200 m: 1994, 1997; C-4 500 m: 1989, 1990; C-4 1000 m: 1989, 1990).
