= Gabriel Gheoca =

Romanian canoeist

Medal record

Men's canoe sprint

Representing Romania

World Championships
Silver medal – second place	2010 Poznań	C-4 1000 m
Silver medal – second place	2011 Szeged	C-4 1000 m

European Championships
Silver medal – second place	2013 Montemor-o-Velho	C-4 1000 m

Gabriel Ghoeca is a Romanian sprint canoer who has been competing since the late 2000s. He won a silver medal in the C-4 1000 m event at the 2010 ICF Canoe Sprint World Championships in Poznań.
