= Erik Leue =

German sprint canoer (born 1985)

Medal record

Men's canoe sprint

Representing Germany

World Championships
Gold medal – first place	2009 Dartmouth	C-2 1000 m
Gold medal – first place	2013 Duisburg	C-4 1000 m
Silver medal – second place	2007 Duisburg	C-4 1000 m
Bronze medal – third place	2013 Duisburg	C-1 500 m

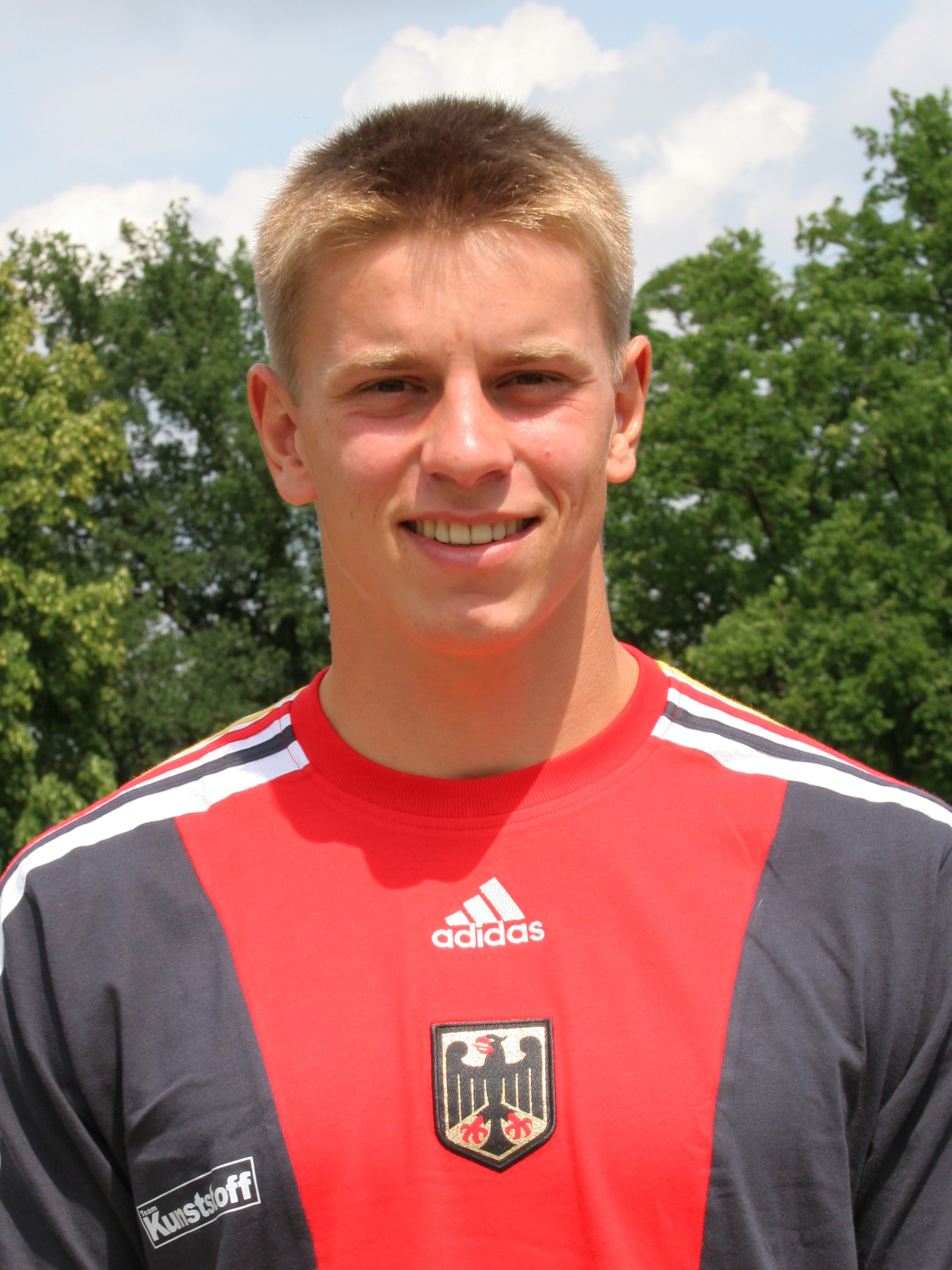
Erik Leue

Erik Leue (born August 9, 1985) is a German sprint canoer who has competed since 2007. He won two medals at the ICF Canoe Sprint World Championships with a gold (C-2 1000 m: 2009) and a silver (C-4 1000 m: 2007).
