= Takhir Kamaletdinov =

Soviet canoeist

Medal record

Men's canoe sprint

World Championships
Silver medal – second place	1985 Mechelen	C-1 10000 m
Bronze medal – third place	1987 Duisburg	C-1 10000 m

Takhir Kamaletdinov is a Soviet sprint canoer who competed in the mid to late 1980s. He won two medals in the C-1 10000 m at the ICF Canoe Sprint World Championships with a silver in 1985 and a bronze in 1987.
