= Cosmin Pașca =

Romanian canoeist

Medal record

Men's canoe sprint

World Championships
Gold medal – first place	1995 Duisburg	C-4 1000 m
Gold medal – first place	1997 Dartmouth	C-4 1000 m
Silver medal – second place	1994 Mexico City	C-4 500 m
Silver medal – second place	1994 Mexico City	C-4 1000 m
Silver medal – second place	1995 Duisburg	C-4 500 m
Silver medal – second place	1997 Dartmouth	C-4 500 m
Silver medal – second place	1998 Szeged	C-4 500 m

Cosmin Paşca is a Romanian sprint canoer who competed from the mid to late 1990s. He won seven medals at the ICF Canoe Sprint World Championships with two golds (C-4 1000 m: 1995, 1997) and five silvers (C-4 500 m: 1994, 1995, 1997, 1998; C-4 1000 m: 1994).
