= Ingo Spelly =

Medal record

Men's canoe sprint

Representing Germany

Olympic Games
| Gold medal – first place | 1992 Barcelona | C-2 1000 m |
| Silver medal – second place | 1988 Seoul | C-2 1000 m |
| Silver medal – second place | 1992 Barcelona | C-2 500 m |

World Championships
| Gold medal – first place | 1990 Poznań | C-2 1000 m |
| Gold medal – first place | 1991 Paris | C-2 1000 m |
| Silver medal – second place | 1990 Poznań | C-2 500 m |
| Silver medal – second place | 1991 Paris | C-4 1000 m |
| Bronze medal – third place | 1986 Montreal | C-2 500 m |
| Bronze medal – third place | 1987 Duisburg | C-2 1000 m |
| Bronze medal – third place | 1993 Copenhagen | C-2 1000 m |

Ingo Spelly (born 6 November 1966 in Lübben, Brandenburg) is an East German-German canoe sprinter who competed from the late 1980s to the early 1990s. Competing in two Summer Olympics, he won three medals with one gold (C-2 1000 m: 1992) and two silvers (C-2 500 m: 1992, C-2 1000 m: 1988).

Spelly also won seven medals at the ICF Canoe Sprint World Championships with two golds (C-2 1000 m: 1990, 1991), two silvers (C-2 500 m: 1990, C-4 1000 m: 1991), and three bronzes (C-2 500 m: 1986, C-2 1000 m: 1987, 1993).
