= Christian Frederiksen =

Danish-Norwegian canoe racer (born 1965)

Medal record

Men's canoe sprint

Olympic Games
Silver medal – second place	1992 Barcelona	C-2 1000 m

World Championships
Gold medal – first place	1987 Duisburg	C-2 10000 m
Gold medal – first place	1989 Plovdiv	C-2 1000 m
Gold medal – first place	1989 Plovdiv	C-2 10000 m
Gold medal – first place	1990 Poznań	C-2 10000 m
Gold medal – first place	1993 Copenhagen	C-2 1000 m
Gold medal – first place	1993 Copenhagen	C-2 10000 m
Silver medal – second place	1993 Copenhagen	C-2 500 m
Bronze medal – third place	1986 Montreal	C-2 10000 m

Christian Frederiksen (born 31 January 1965 in Virum, Denmark) is a Danish-Norwegian] sprint canoer and marathon canoeist who competed from the late 1980s to the early 2000s (decade). Competing in four Summer Olympics, he won a silver medal in the C-2 1000 m event at Barcelona in 1992.

== Career ==
Frederiksen moved from Denmark to Norway after the 1996 Summer Olympics in Atlanta.

He found better success at the ICF Canoe Sprint World Championships with eight medals. This includes six golds (C-2 1000 m: 1989, 1993; C-2 10000 m: 1987, 1989, 1990, 1993), one silver (C-2 500 m: 1993), and one bronze (C-2 10000 m: 1986).
