= Jiří Vrdlovec =

Czechoslovak sprint canoer and marathon canoeist

Medal record

Men's canoe sprint

World Championships
Gold medal – first place	1983 Tampere	C-1 10000 m
Gold medal – first place	1985 Mechelen	C-1 10000 m
Silver medal – second place	1982 Belgrade	C-1 10000 m
Bronze medal – third place	1981 Nottingham	C-1 1000 m
Bronze medal – third place	1981 Nottingham	C-2 10000 m
Bronze medal – third place	1983 Tampere	C-1 1000 m

Jiří Vrdlovec (born 29 June 1956) is a Czechoslovak sprint canoer and marathon canoeist who competed in the early to mid-1980s. He won six medals at the ICF Canoe Sprint World Championships with two golds (C-1 10000 m: 1983, 1985), one silver (C-1 10000 m: 1982, and three bronzes (C-1 1000 m: 1981, 1983; C-2 10000 m: 1981).

Vrdlovec also competed at the 1980 Summer Olympics in Moscow where he finished fifth in both the C-2 500 m and C-2 1000 m events.
