= Gyula Hajdu =

Hungarian canoeist

Medal record

Men's canoe sprint

World Championships
Gold medal – first place	1982 Belgrade	C-2 1000 m
Silver medal – second place	1978 Belgrade	C-1 500 m

Gyula Hajdu is a Hungarian sprint canoer who competed in the early 1980s. He won a gold medal in the C-2 1000 m event at the 1982 ICF Canoe Sprint World Championships in Belgrade and a silver medal in the C-1 500 m event at the 1978 ICF Canoe Sprint World Championships in Belgrade.
