= Csaba Horváth (canoeist) =

Hungarian canoeist (born 1971)

Medal record

Men's canoe sprint

Olympic Games
| Gold medal – first place | 1996 Atlanta | C-2 500 m |
| Bronze medal – third place | 1996 Atlanta | C-2 1000 m |

World Championships
| Gold medal – first place | 1993 Copenhagen | C-2 500 m |
| Gold medal – first place | 1993 Copenhagen | C-4 1000 m |
| Gold medal – first place | 1994 Mexico City | C-4 1000 m |
| Gold medal – first place | 1995 Duisburg | C-2 200 m |
| Gold medal – first place | 1995 Duisburg | C-2 500 m |
| Gold medal – first place | 1995 Duisburg | C-2 1000 m |
| Gold medal – first place | 1995 Duisburg | C-4 200 m |
| Gold medal – first place | 1995 Duisburg | C-4 500 m |
| Gold medal – first place | 1997 Dartmouth | C-2 500 m |
| Gold medal – first place | 1997 Dartmouth | C-4 500 m |
| Gold medal – first place | 1998 Szeged | C-2 500 m |
| Gold medal – first place | 1998 Szeged | C-4 500 m |
| Gold medal – first place | 1998 Szeged | C-4 1000 m |
| Silver medal – second place | 1994 Mexico City | C-2 200 m |
| Silver medal – second place | 1994 Mexico City | C-2 500 m |
| Silver medal – second place | 1994 Mexico City | C-4 200 m |
| Silver medal – second place | 1997 Dartmouth | C-2 1000 m |
| Silver medal – second place | 1997 Dartmouth | C-4 200 m |
| Bronze medal – third place | 1999 Milan | C-4 1000 m |

Csaba Horváth (born 4 April 1971 in Budapest) is a Hungarian sprint canoeist who competed in the 1990s. At the 1996 Summer Olympics in Atlanta, he won two medals with teammate György Kolonics. This included a gold in the C-2 500 m and a bronze in the C-2 1000 m events.

Horváth has also won nineteen medals at the ICF Canoe Sprint World Championships, with 13 gold (C-2 200 m: 1995, C-2 500 m: 1993, 1995, 1997, 1998; C-2 1000 m: 1995, C-4 200 m: 1995, C-4 500 m: 1995, 1997, 1998; C-4 1000 m: 1993, 1994, 1998), five silvers (C-2 200 m: 1994, C-2 500 m: 1994, C-2 1000 m: 1997, C-4 200 m: 1994, 1997), and one bronze (C-4 1000 m: 1999).

== Awards ==
- Member of the Hungarian team of year (with György Kolonics): 1995, 1996
- Hungarian canoer of the Year (3): 1995, 1996, 1998
- Order of Merit of the Republic of Hungary – Officer's Cross (1996)
