= István Cserha =

Hungarian canoeist

Medal record

Men's canoe sprint

World Championships
Silver medal – second place	1971 Belgrade	C-2 10000 m
Bronze medal – third place	1966 East Berlin	C-2 10000 m

István Cserha is a Hungarian sprint canoeist who competed in the late 1960s and early 1970s. He won two medals in the C-2 10000 m event at the ICF Canoe Sprint World Championships with a silver in 1971 and a bronze in 1966.
