= Istvan Capusta =

Romanian sprint canoeist

Medal record

Men's canoe sprint

World Championships
Gold medal – first place	1979 Duisburg	C-2 500 m

Istvan Capusta is a Romanian sprint canoeist who competed in the late 1970s. He won a gold medal in the C-2 500 m event at the 1979 ICF Canoe Sprint World Championships in Duisburg.
