= Karel Kožíšek =

Czech canoeist

Medal record

Men's canoe sprint

World Championships
| Gold medal – first place | 1998 Szeged | C-4 200 m |
| Silver medal – second place | 1999 Milan | C-4 200 m |
| Silver medal – second place | 2001 Poznań | C-4 200 m |
| Silver medal – second place | 2002 Seville | C-4 200 m |
| Silver medal – second place | 2003 Gainesville | C-4 200 m |

Karel Kožíšek (born 6 August 1977) is a Czech sprint canoeist who competed in the late 1990s and early 2000s. He won five medals in the C-4 200 m event at the ICF Canoe Sprint World Championships with a gold (1998) and four silvers (1999, 2001, 2002, 2003).
