= Vicol Calabiciov =

Romanian canoeist

Personal information
- Born: Mila 23, Romania

Sport
- Sport: Canoe sprint
Medal record
Representing Romania
World Championships
Gold medal – first place	1966 East Berlin	C-2 1000 m
Bronze medal – third place	1971 Belgrade	C-2 10000 m

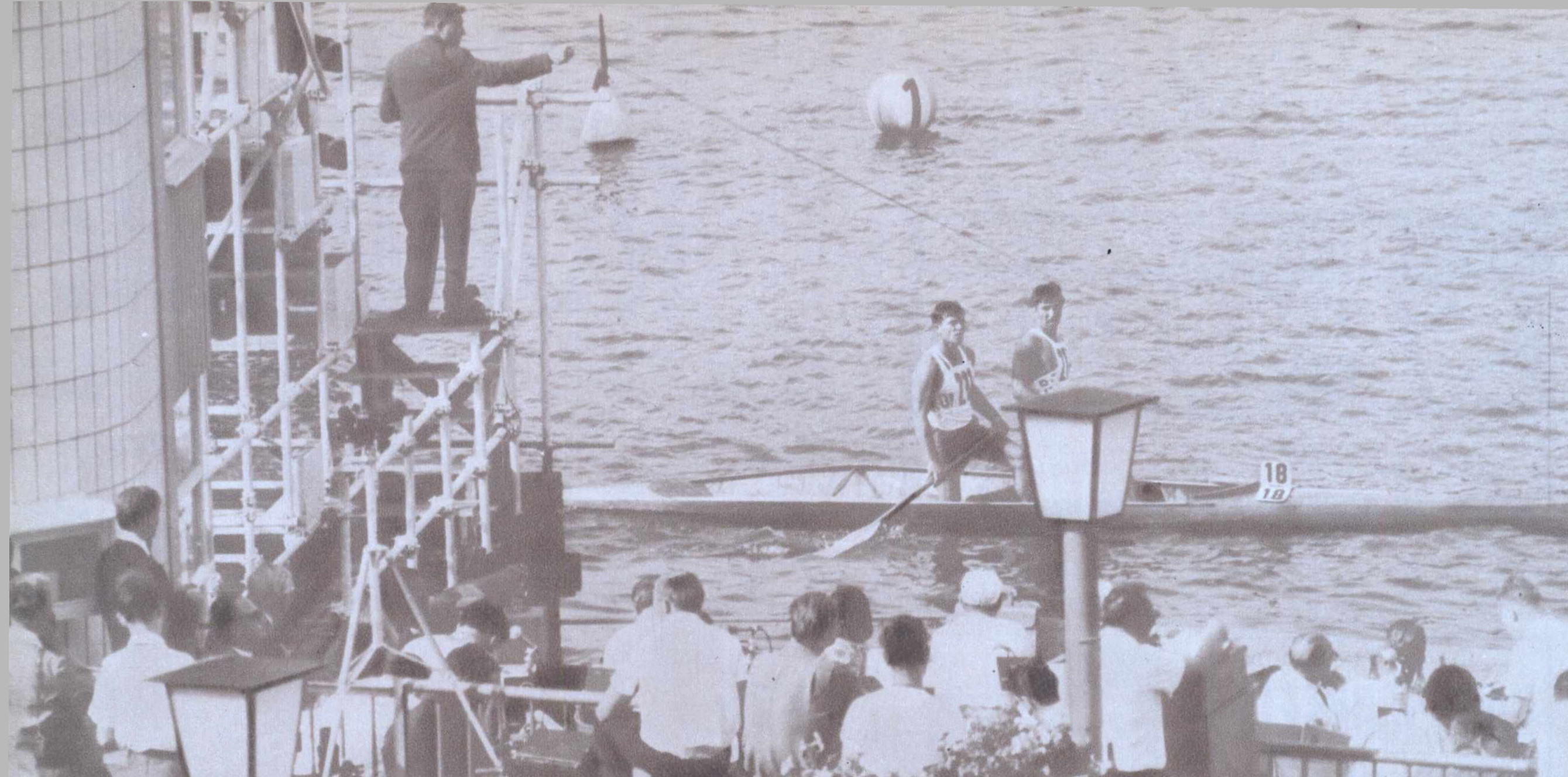
7th edition of the world canoeing championships: Vicol Calabiciov and Serghei Covaliov, world champions (canoe 2 — 1,000 m)

Vicol Calabiciov is a retired Romanian sprint canoeist who competed in the late 1960s and early 1970s. He won two medals at the ICF Canoe Sprint World Championships with a gold (C-2 1000 m: 1966) and a bronze (C-2 10000 m: 1971).
