= István Vaskuti =

Hungarian sprint canoeist (born 1955)

Medal record

Men's canoe sprint

Representing Hungary

Olympic Games
Gold medal – first place	1980 Moscow	C-2 500 m

World Championships
Gold medal – first place	1977 Sofia	C-2 500 m
Gold medal – first place	1978 Belgrade	C-2 500 m
Gold medal – first place	1981 Nottingham	C-2 500 m
Gold medal – first place	1985 Mechelen	C-2 500 m
Gold medal – first place	1986 Montreal	C-2 500 m
Gold medal – first place	1986 Montreal	C-2 1000 m
Bronze medal – third place	1982 Belgrade	C-2 500 m

István Vaskuti (born December 4, 1955, in Debrecen) is a Hungarian sprint canoeist who competed from the late 1970s to the late 1980s. He participated in two Summer Olympics and won the C-2 500 m event in Moscow in 1980.

Vaskuti also won seven medals at the ICF Canoe Sprint World Championships, including six golds (C-2 500 m: 1977, 1978, 1981, 1985, 1986; C-2 1000 m: 1986) and one bronze (C-2 500 m: 1982). After his career as active competitor, he became a canoe coach, achieving success in this role and winning several world and Olympic titles with various renowned canoeists.

He is now a sports administrator and serves as the chairman of the International Canoe Federation Flatwater Committee. Vaskuti was the Chief Official at the 2006 World Championships, held in the Hungarian city of Szeged. In 2008, he was elected First Vice President of the ICF at their Congress in Rome.
