= László Vaskúti =

Hungarian sprint canoeist

Medal record

Men's canoe sprint

World Championships
Gold medal – first place	1978 Belgrade	C-2 10000 m
Gold medal – first place	1981 Nottingham	C-2 10000 m
Gold medal – first place	1983 Tampere	C-2 10000 m
Bronze medal – third place	1979 Duisburg	C-2 10000 m
Bronze medal – third place	1982 Belgrade	C-2 10000 m

László Vaskúti is a Hungarian sprint canoeist who competed from the late 1970s to the mid-1980s. He won five medals in the C-2 10000 m event at the ICF Canoe Sprint World Championships with three golds (1978, 1981, 1983) and two bronzes (1979, 1982).
