= Ulrich Papke =

Canoe racer

Medal record

Men's canoe sprint

Representing Germany

Olympic Games
Gold medal – first place	1992 Barcelona	C-2 1000 m
Silver medal – second place	1992 Barcelona	C-2 500 m

World Championships
Gold medal – first place	1981 Nottingham	C-1 1000 m
Gold medal – first place	1990 Poznań	C-2 1000 m
Gold medal – first place	1991 Paris	C-2 1000 m
Silver medal – second place	1983 Tampere	C-1 500 m
Silver medal – second place	1990 Poznań	C-2 500 m
Silver medal – second place	1991 Paris	C-4 1000 m
Bronze medal – third place	1985 Mechelen	C-2 500 m
Bronze medal – third place	1986 Montreal	C-2 500 m
Bronze medal – third place	1987 Duisburg	C-2 1000 m
Bronze medal – third place	1993 Copenhagen	C-2 1000 m
Bronze medal – third place	1995 Duisburg	C-4 1000 m

Ulrich Papke (born 4 May 1962) is an East German-German sprint canoeist who competed from the early 1980s to the mid-1990s. He won two medals at the 1992 Summer Olympics in Barcelona with a gold in the C-2 1000 m event and a silver in the C-2 500 m event.

Papke had better success at the ICF Canoe Sprint World Championships where he won eleven medals. This included three golds (C-1 1000 m: 1981, C-2 1000: 1990, 1991), three silvers (C-1 500 m: 1983, C-2 500 m: 1990, C-4 1000 m: 1991), and five bronzes (C-2 500 m: 1985, 1986; C-2 1000 m: 1987, 1993; C-4 1000 m: 1995).
