= Canoeing at the 1988 Summer Olympics – Men's C-2 500 metres =

The men's C-2 500 metres event was an open-style, pairs canoeing event conducted as part of the Canoeing at the 1988 Summer Olympics program.

== Medalists ==
Gold	Silver	Bronze
Viktor Reneysky and Nicolae Juravschi (URS)	Marek Dopierała and Marek Łbik (POL)	Philippe Renaud and Joël Bettin (FRA)

== Results ==
=== Heats ===
17 teams entered in three heats on September 26. The top three finishers from each of the heats advanced directly to the semifinals and the remaining eight teams were relegated to the repechages.

Heat 1
1.	Deyan Bonev and Petar Bozhilov (BUL)	1:44.53	QS
2.	Hartmut Faust and Wolfram Faust (FRG)	1:46.52	QS
3.	Enrique Míguez and Narcisco Suárez (ESP)	1:48.75	QS
4.	Guo Daen and Ke Hua (CHN)	1:56.02	QR
5.	Choi Chang-Hwan and Park Gyeong-Cheol (KOR)	2:01.08	QR
Heat 2
1.	Marek Dopierała and Marek Łbik (POL)	1:43.09	QS
2.	Philippe Renaud and Joël Bettin (FRA)	1:43.83	QS
3.	Christian Frederiksen and Arne Nielsson (DEN)	1:43.92	QS
4.	Petr Procházka and Alan Lohniský (TCH)	1:46.30	QR
5.	Andrew Train and Stephen Train (GBR)	1:46.95	QR
6.	Tsunehisa Uchino and Kiyoto Inoue (JPN)	1:48.90	QR
Heat 3
1.	Alexander Schuck and Thomas Zereske (GDR)	1:42.67	QS
2.	Viktor Reneysky and Nicolae Juravschi (URS)	1:42.80	QS
3.	János Sarusi Kis and István Vaskuti (HUN)	1:43.16	QS
4.	Grigore Obreja and Gheorghe Andriev (ROU)	1:44.91	QR
5.	David Frost and Eric Smith (CAN)	1:46.93	QR
6.	Rodney McLain and Bruce Merritt (USA)	1:51.48	QR

=== Repechages ===
Taking place on September 26, the top three finishers from each of the repechages advanced directly to the semifinals.

Repechage 1
1.	Andrew Train and Stephen Train (GBR)	1:52.63	QS
2.	David Frost and Eric Smith (CAN)	1:53.07	QS
3.	Rodney McLain and Bruce Merritt (USA)	1:53.36	QS
4.	Guo Daen and Ke Hua (CHN)	1:53.69
Repechage 2
1.	Petr Procházka and Alan Lohniský (TCH)	1:50.23	QS
2.	Grigore Obreja and Gheorghe Andriev (ROU)	1:50.44	QS
3.	Tsunehisa Uchino and Kiyoto Inoue (JPN)	1:55.13	QS
4.	Choi Chang-Hwan and Park Gyeong-Cheol (KOR)	2:05.58

=== Semifinals ===
Three semifinals were held on September 28. The top three finishers from each semifinal advanced to the final.

Semifinal 1
1.	János Sarusi Kis and István Vaskuti (HUN)	1:45.91	QF
2.	Philippe Renaud and Joël Bettin (FRA)	1:45.99	QF
3.	Deyan Bonev and Petar Bozhilov (BUL)	1:48.60	QF
4.	Andrew Train and Stephen Train (GBR)	1:50.31
5.	Tsunehisa Uchino and Kiyoto Inoue (JPN)	1:50.89
Semifinal 2
1.	Viktor Reneysky and Nicolae Juravschi (URS)	1:45.16	QF
2.	Marek Dopierała and Marek Łbik (POL)	1:49.06	QF
3.	Petr Procházka and Alan Lohniský (TCH)	1:50.14	QF
4.	Enrique Míguez and Narcisco Suárez (ESP)	1:50.63
5.	Rodney McLain and Bruce Merritt (USA)	1:53.32
Semifinal 3
1.	Alexander Schuck and Thomas Zereske (GDR)	1:46.07	QF
2.	Grigore Obreja and Gheorghe Andriev (ROU)	1:46.25	QF
3.	Christian Frederiksen and Arne Nielsson (DEN)	1:47.24	QF
4.	Hartmut Faust and Wolfram Faust (FRG)	1:47.70
5.	David Frost and Eric Smith (CAN)	1:49.92

=== Final ===
The final was held on September 30.

Gold	Viktor Reneysky and Nicolae Juravschi (URS)	1:41.77
Silver	Marek Dopierała and Marek Łbik (POL)	1:43.61
Bronze	Philippe Renaud and Joël Bettin (FRA)	1:43.81
4.	Deyan Bonev and Petar Bozhilov (BUL)	1:44.32
5.	Alexander Schuck and Thomas Zereske (GDR)	1:44.36
6.	János Sarusi Kis and István Vaskuti (HUN)	1:44.85
7.	Grigore Obreja and Gheorghe Andriev (ROU)	1:45.84
8.	Christian Frederiksen and Arne Nielsson (DEN)	1:45.90
9.	Petr Procházka and Alan Lohniský (TCH)	1:51.00

The Bulgarians false started from Lane 2 and the race had to be restarted.
