= Sakamoto =

Sakamoto (written: 坂本) is the 40th most common Japanese surname. A less common variant is 坂元.

Notable people with the surname include:

- Chika Sakamoto (born 1959), voice actor and singer
- Fuyumi Sakamoto (born 1967), enka singer
- Hayato Sakamoto (坂本 勇人; born 1988), Japanese professional baseball player
- Hideki Sakamoto (born 1972), video game composer
- Hiroshi Sakamoto (坂本 弘; born 1960), Japanese swimmer
- Kaori Sakamoto (born 2000), Japanese figure skater
- Kazma Sakamoto (born 1982), Japanese professional wrestler
- Kazuko Sakamoto (坂本 和子; born 1935), Japanese swimmer
- Kerri Sakamoto (born 1960), Canadian novelist
- Kodai Sakamoto (坂本 広大; born 1995), Japanese footballer
- Koki Sakamoto (坂本 功貴; born 1986), gymnast
- Kyu Sakamoto (1941–1985), pop singer well known for his song "Sukiyaki" in the 1960s
- Maaya Sakamoto (born 1980), voice actor and singer
- Mashiro Sakamoto (born 1999), singer, member of the South Korean girl group Madein and former member of South Korean girl group Kep1er
- Miu Sakamoto (born 1980), pop singer, daughter of Ryuichi Sakamoto
- Sakamoto Ryōma (坂本 龍馬; 1836–1867), military leader prior to the Meiji Restoration
- Ryuichi Sakamoto (1952–2023), musician and composer, as well as an actor
- Seishirō Sakamoto (坂本 誠志郎; born 1993), Japanese baseball player
- Seiya Sakamoto (坂本 征也; born 1944), Japanese water polo player
- Shōgo Sakamoto (born 1993), actor and singer
- Soichi Sakamoto (1921–2012), American swimming coach
- Takao Sakamoto (阪本 孝男; born 1958), Japanese high jumper
- Takehiro Sakamoto (坂本 豪大; born 1976), Japanese freestyle skier
- Tatsuhiro Sakamoto (坂元 達裕; born 1996), Japanese footballer
- Toshisuke Sakamoto (坂本 利介; born 1965), Japanese sprint canoeist
- Yoshio Sakamoto (born 1959), game designer for Nintendo
- The victims of the Sakamoto family murder perpetrated by members of the Aum Shinrikyo cult

== Fictional characters ==
- Sakamoto (Maison Ikkoku), from Maison Ikkoku
- Sakamoto-san, a talking cat from Nichijou
- Sakamoto from Haven't You Heard? I'm Sakamoto
- Akira Sakamoto, and Harumi Sakamoto from Princess Princess
- Chiyo Sakamoto from Memoirs of a Geisha
- Julietta Sakamoto from Air Master
- Ryōta Sakamoto (坂本 竜太), the main character in the manga series Btooom! (ブトゥーム!)
- Sue, her brother Kazuma, and their mother Momorin Sakamoto from Cave Story
- Mio Sakamoto, from Strike Witches
- Masayuki Sakamoto, the main character in the 2002 South Korean science fiction film 2009: Lost Memories
- Ryuji Sakamoto, from Persona 5
- Taro Sakamoto, from Sakamoto Days
- Tatsuma Sakamoto, from Gintama
