= Canoeing at the 1988 Summer Olympics – Men's C-2 1000 metres =

The men's C-2 1000 metres event was an open-style, pairs canoeing event conducted as part of the Canoeing at the 1988 Summer Olympics program.

== Medalists ==
Gold	Silver	Bronze
Viktor Reneysky and Nicolae Juravschi (URS)	Olaf Heukrodt and Ingo Spelly (GDR)	Marek Dopierała and Marek Łbik (POL)

== Results ==
=== Heats ===
17 teams entered in three heats on September 27. The top four finishers from each of the heats advanced directly to the semifinals and the remaining five teams were relegated to the semifinal.

Heat 1
1.	Viktor Reneysky and Nicolae Juravschi (URS)	3:48.27	QS
2.	Christian Frederiksen and Arne Nielsson (DEN)	3:50.58	QS
3.	Andrew Train and Stephen Train (GBR)	3:55.90	QS
4.	David Frost and Eric Smith (CAN)	3:58.15	QS
5.	Mirko Nišović and Matija Ljubek (YUG)	4:02.10	QR
6.	Gregory Steward and Ronald Urick (USA)	4:26.56	QR
Heat 2
1.	Grigore Obreja and Gheorghe Andriev (ROU)	3:48.41	QS
2.	Pascal Sylvoz and Didier Hoyer (FRA)	3:48.47	QS
3.	Tomáš Křivánek and Waldemar Fibigr (TCH)	3:54.38	QS
4.	Toshisuke Sakamoto and Katsuya Toyama (JPN)	4:09.29	QS
5.	Choi Chang-Hwan and Park Gyeong-Cheol (KOR)	4:23.51	QR
Heat 3
1.	Olaf Heukrodt and Ingo Spelly (GDR)	3:40.82	QS
2.	Marek Dopierała and Marek Łbik (POL)	3:44.24	QS
3.	Gábor Takács and Gusztáv Leikep (HUN)	3:45.50	QS
4.	Hartmut Faust and Wolfram Faust (FRG)	3:52.43	QS
5.	Deyan Bonev and Petar Bozhilov (BUL)	4:01.42	QR
6.	Guo Daen and Ke Hua (CHN)	4:15.50	QR

The Chinese team's intermediate times were not recorded in the official report.

=== Repechage ===
A repechage was held on September 27. The top three finishers from the repechage advanced to the semifinal.

Repechage
1.	Guo Daen and Ke Hua (CHN)	4:06.60	QS
2.	Deyan Bonev and Petar Bozhilov (BUL)	4:06.91	QS
3.	David Frost and Eric Smith (CAN)	4:06.93	QS
4.	Gregory Steward and Ronald Urick (USA)	4:17.77
5.	Choi Chang-Hwan and Park Gyeong-Cheol (KOR)	4:18.23

=== Semifinals ===
Three semifinals took place on September 29. The top three finishers from each semifinal advanced directly to the final.

Semifinal 1
1.	Viktor Reneysky and Nicolae Juravschi (URS)	3:46.85	QF
2.	Pascal Sylvoz and Didier Hoyer (FRA)	3:55.25	QF
3.	Gábor Takács and Gusztáv Leikep (HUN)	3:59.08	QF
4.	Guo Daen and Ke Hua (CHN)	4:06.49
5.	Toshisuke Sakamoto and Katsuya Toyama (JPN)	4:09.20
Semifinal 2
1.	Marek Dopierała and Marek Łbik (POL)	3:50.45	QF
2.	Hartmut Faust and Wolfram Faust (FRG)	3:52.03	QF
3.	Grigore Obreja and Gheorghe Andriev (ROU)	3:53.76	QF
4.	David Frost and Eric Smith (CAN)	3:57.34
5.	Andrew Train and Stephen Train (GBR)	3:59.22
Semifinal 3
1.	Olaf Heukrodt and Ingo Spelly (GDR)	3:50.10	QF
2.	Christian Frederiksen and Arne Nielsson (DEN)	3:51.62	QF
3.	Deyan Bonev and Petar Bozhilov (BUL)	3:54.98	QF
4.	Tomáš Křivánek and Waldemar Fibigr (TCH)	3:56.15
5.	Mirko Nišović and Matija Ljubek (YUG)	3:59.04

=== Final ===
The final was held on October 1.

Gold	Viktor Reneysky and Nicolae Juravschi (URS)	3:48.36
Silver	Olaf Heukrodt and Ingo Spelly (GDR)	3:51.44
Bronze	Marek Dopierała and Marek Łbik (POL)	3:54.33
4.	Christian Frederiksen and Arne Nielsson (DEN)	3:54.94
5.	Hartmut Faust and Wolfram Faust (FRG)	3:55.62
6.	Grigore Obreja and Gheorghe Andriev (ROU)	3:56.56
7.	Gábor Takács and Gusztáv Leikep (HUN)	4:04.18
8.	Pascal Sylvoz and Didier Hoyer (FRA)	4:04.75
9.	Deyan Bonev and Petar Bozhilov (BUL)	4:11.62
