= Petr Procházka =

Czech sprint canoeist (born 1964)

Medal record

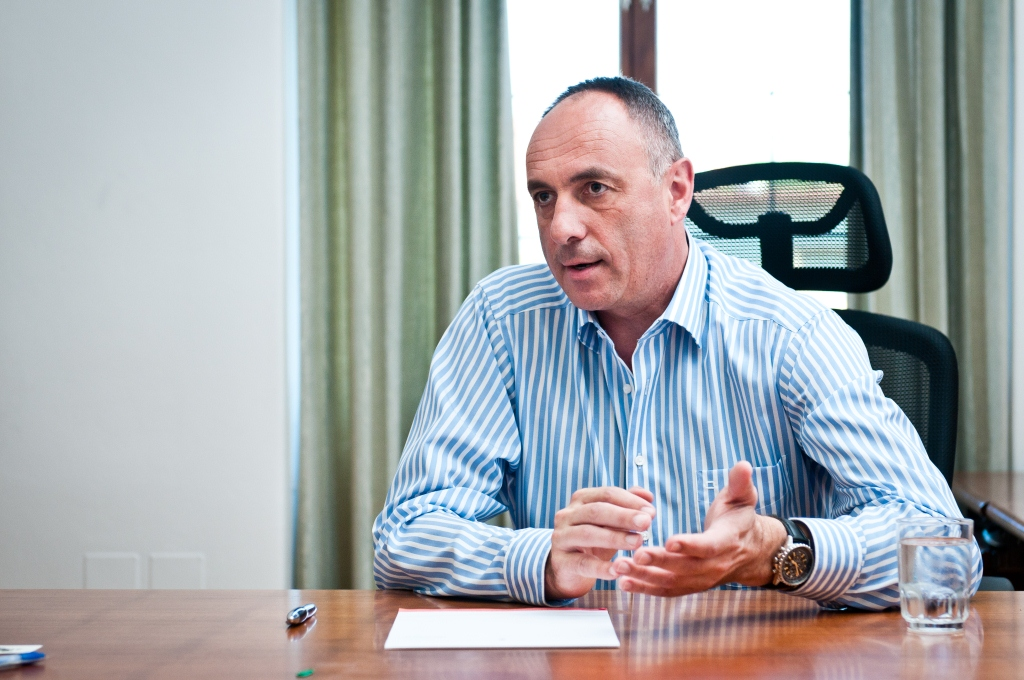
Men's canoe sprint

World Championships
| Gold medal – first place | 1998 Szeged | C-4 200 m |
| Gold medal – first place | 2006 Szeged | C-4 200 m |
| Silver medal – second place | 1987 Duisburg | C-1 500 m |
| Silver medal – second place | 1995 Duisburg | C-4 200 m |
| Silver medal – second place | 1999 Milan | C-4 200 m |
| Silver medal – second place | 2002 Seville | C-4 200 m |
| Silver medal – second place | 2005 Zagreb | C-4 200 m |
| Bronze medal – third place | 1987 Duisburg | C-2 500 m |
| Bronze medal – third place | 1993 Copenhagen | C-4 500 m |
| Bronze medal – third place | 1994 Mexico City | C-4 200 m |
| Bronze medal – third place | 1997 Dartmouth | C-4 200 m |

Petr Procházka (born 26 March 1964) is a Czech sprint canoeist who competed from 1982 to 2006 for Czechoslovakia and the Czech Republic.

== Biography ==
Procházka was born on 26 March 1964 in Hradec Králové. World junior champion in Belgrade in 1982, he missed the 1984 Olympics because of the Eastern Bloc's boycott but went on to win two medals at the 1987 senior World Championships in Duisburg, West Germany. In the individual C-1 500 m he was the silver medallist. He also won a bronze medal in the C-2 500 m with partner Alan Lohniský. At the 1988 Summer Olympics however he came a disappointing eighth in the C-1 500 m and ninth in the C-2 500 m.

Ten years later, at an age when most canoeists are contemplating retirement, Procházka was embarking on a remarkable run of victories as a member of the Czech four-man C-4 200 m crew. He won a world championship gold medal in 1998, followed by four European titles (1999, 2000, 2001 and 2005). The 200 m, the shortest race distance, was ideal for Procházka, with his great physical strength and excellent technique more than compensating for a natural loss of stamina.

At the age of forty-two, the evergreen Procházka and the C-4 200 m crew finished in fourth place at the 2006 European Championships held in Račice (where he now lives) in the Czech Republic. They had lost their European crown, but a month later they finally became world champions in Szeged, Hungary, an astonishing achievement for Procházka, the oldest competitor at the championships. Procházka would win a total of ten world championship medals in his career.

Nicknamed Čáp ('Stork'), he is also still a member of the Czech Republic national Dragon boat squad. He is 175cmm (5'9") tall and weighs 85 kg (187 lbs).
