= Canoeing at the 1987 Pan American Games – Men's C-2 1000 metres =

Men's C-2 1000 metres at the 1987 Pan American Games
- Venue: Eagle Creek Park
- Dates: 9 August
- Competitors: 10 from 5 nations
- Winning time: 3.50.13

Medalists
Gold medal	Jack Chubaty; Max Tracy	Canada
Silver medal	Rod McLain; Jim Terrell	United States
Bronze medal	Jorge Montero; Juan Aballi	Cuba

The men's C-2 1000 metres canoeing event at the 1987 Pan American Games was held at the Eagle Creek Park in Indianapolis.

== Results ==
=== Final ===
Rank	Athletes	Country	Time	Notes
1st place, gold medalist(s)	Jack Chubaty; Max Tracy	Canada	3.50.13	
2nd place, silver medalist(s)	Rod McLain; Jim Terrell	United States	3.53.10	
3rd place, bronze medalist(s)	Jorge Montero; Juan Aballi	Cuba	3.57.38	
4	Octavio Morales; Alfredo Morales	Mexico	4.10.55	
5	Leopoldo Sanzi; Carlos Martinovich	Argentina	4.18.63	
