= Tsunehisa =

- Pronunciation: [tsɯneçisa]
- Gender: Male

Origin
- Origin: Japanese
- Meaning: Different meanings depending on the kanji used

Other names
- Alternative spelling: Tunehisa (Nihon-siki); Tunehisa (Kunrei-shiki); Tsunehisa (Hepburn)

Tsunehisa is a masculine Japanese given name.

== Written forms ==
Tsunehisa can be written using different combinations of kanji characters. Here are some examples:

- 常久, "usual, long time"
- 常尚, "usual, still"
- 常寿, "usual, long life"
- 恒久, "always, long time"
- 恒尚, "always, still"
- 恒寿, "always, long life"
- 庸久, "common, long time"
- 庸尚, "common, still"
- 庸寿, "common, long life"
- 毎久, "every, long time"
- 毎尚, "every, still"
- 毎寿, "every, long life"

The name can also be written in hiragana つねひさ or katakana ツネヒサ.

== Notable people with the name ==
- Tsunehisa Amago (尼子 経久; 1458-1541), Japanese daimyō.
- Tsunehisa Kimura (木村 恒久; 1928–2008), Japanese artist.
- Prince Takeda Tsunehisa (竹田宮恒久王, Takeda-no-miya Tsunehisa-ō; 1882–1919), Japanese prince and general.
- Tsunehisa Uchino (内野 経久; born 1965), Japanese sprint canoeist.
