= Urick =

Urick is a surname. Notable people with the surname include:

- Max Urick (born c. 1940), American football coach
- Ronald Urick (born 1968), American sprint canoer
- Scott Urick (born 1977), American lacrosse player
