= Gusztáv Leikep =

Hungarian canoeist (born 1966)

Medal record

Men's canoe sprint

World Championships
Silver medal – second place	1989 Plovdiv	C-4 1000 m
Silver medal – second place	1990 Poznań	C-4 500 m
Silver medal – second place	1990 Poznań	C-4 1000 m

Gusztáv Leikep (born August 19, 1966) is a Hungarian sprint canoer who competed in the late 1980s and early 1990s. He won three silver medals at the ICF Canoe Sprint World Championships with a one in the C-4 500 m (1990) and two in the C-4 1000 m (1989, 1990).

Leikep also finished seventh in the C-2 1000 m event at the 1988 Summer Olympics in Seoul.
