= Fernando Zamora =

Cuban sprint canoer (born 1970)

Personal information
- Full name: Fernando Zamora Machado
- Born: 1 March 1970 (age 56)
- Height: 175 cm (5 ft 9 in)
- Weight: 72 kg (159 lb)
Medal record
Men's canoe sprint
Representing Cuba
Pan American Games
Gold medal – first place	1991 Havana	C-2 500m
Gold medal – first place	1991 Havana	C-2 1000m
Bronze medal – third place	1995 Mar del Plata	C-2 500m
Central American and Caribbean Games
Gold medal – first place	1990 Mexico City	C-2 500m
Gold medal – first place	1990 Mexico City	C-2 10,000m
Gold medal – first place	1993 Ponce	C-2 200m
Gold medal – first place	1993 Ponce	C-2 500m

Fernando Zamora Machado (Note: In this Spanish name, the first or paternal surname is Zamora and the second or maternal family name is Machado.) (born 1 March 1970) is a Cuban sprint canoer who competed in the early 1990s. At the 1992 Summer Olympics in Barcelona, he finished ninth in the C-2 1000 m event while being eliminated in the semifinals of the C-2 500 m event.
