= Deyan Bonev =

Bulgarian sprint canoer (born 1967)

Medal record

Men's canoe sprint

World Championships
Bronze medal – third place	1989 Plovdiv	C-4 1000 m

Deyan Bonev (Bulgarian: Деян Бонев) (born July 2, 1967) is a Bulgarian sprint canoer who competed in the late 1980s. He won a bronze medal in the C-4 1000 m event at the 1989 ICF Canoe Sprint World Championships in Plovdiv.

At the 1988 Summer Olympics in Seoul, paired with Petar Bozhilov, Boneve finished fourth in the C-2 500 m and ninth in the C-2 1000 m events.
