= Canoeing at the 1992 Summer Olympics – Men's C-2 1000 metres =

The men's C-2 1000 metres event was an open-style, pairs canoeing event conducted as part of the Canoeing at the 1992 Summer Olympics program.

== Medalists ==
Gold	Silver	Bronze
Ulrich Papke and Ingo Spelly (GER)	Arne Nielsson and Christian Frederiksen (DEN)	Didier Hoyer and Olivier Boivin (FRA)

== Results ==
=== Heats ===
14 teams entered in two heats. The top two finishers from each of the heats advanced directly to the finals and the remaining teams were relegated to the semifinals.

Heat 1
1.	Ulrich Papke and Ingo Spelly (GER)	3:32.08	QF
2.	Christian Frederiksen and Arne Nielsson (DEN)	3:32.32	QF
3.	Martin Marinov and Blagovest Stoyanov (BUL)	3:33.57	QS
4.	Dariusz Koszykowski and Mariusz Walkowiak (POL)	3:38.72	QS
5.	Andrew Train and Stephen Train (GBR)	3:40.13	QS
6.	José Antonio Romero and José Ramón Ferrer (MEX)	3:41.10	QS
7.	Fernando Zamora and Juan Aballí (CUB)	3:48.78	QS
Heat 2
1.	Gheorghe Andriev and Nicolae Juravschi (ROU)	3:34.92	QF
2.	Didier Hoyer and Olivier Boivin (FRA)	3:35.82	QF
3.	Attila Pálizs and György Kolonics (HUN)	3:37.55	QS
4.	Aleski Igraev and Aleksandr Gramovich (EUN)	3:38.11	QS
5.	Larry Cain and David Frost (CAN)	3:38.84	QS
6.	Katsuya Toyama and Tsunehisa Uchino (JPN)	3:52.11	QS
7.	Wyatt Jones and Gregory Steward (USA)	4:01.65	QS

=== Semifinals ===
Two semifinals took place. The top two finishers from each semifinal and the fastest third-place finisher advanced directly to the final.

Semifinal 1
1.	Attila Pálizs and György Kolonics (HUN)	3:43.96	QF
2.	Fernando Zamora and Juan Aballí (CUB)	3:46.01	QF
3.	Andrew Train and Stephen Train (GBR)	3:46.36
4.	Dariusz Koszykowski and Mariusz Walkowiak (POL)	3:48.28
5.	Katsuya Toyama and Tsunehisa Uchino (JPN)	3:57.81
Semifinal 2
1.	Martin Marinov and Blagovest Stoyanov (BUL)	3:39.58	QF
2.	Aleski Igraev and Aleksandr Gramovich (EUN)	3:39.66	QF
3.	Larry Cain and David Frost (CAN)	3:40.86	QF
4.	José Antonio Romero and José Ramón Ferrer (MEX)	3:44.13
-	Wyatt Jones and Gregory Steward (USA)	3:56.33	DISQ

The American's disqualification was not disclosed in the official report.

=== Final ===
The final was held on August 8.

Gold	Ulrich Papke and Ingo Spelly (GER)	3:37.42
Silver	Christian Frederiksen and Arne Nielsson (DEN)	3:39.26
Bronze	Didier Hoyer and Olivier Boivin (FRA)	3:39.51
4.	Gheorghe Andriev and Nicolae Juravschi (ROU)	3:39.88
5.	Attila Pálizs and György Kolonics (HUN)	3:42.86
6.	Martin Marinov and Blagovest Stoyanov (BUL)	3:43.97
7.	Larry Cain and David Frost (CAN)	3:46.21
8.	Aleski Igraev and Aleksandr Gramovich (EUN)	3:53.90
9.	Fernando Zamora and Juan Aballí (CUB)	4:00.06

The Germans fought off a mid-race challenge from the Danes before winning going away.
