= Wyatt Jones =

American canoeist

Wyatt Jones (born April 1, 1970) is an American sprint canoer who competed in the early 1990s. At the 1992 Summer Olympics in Barcelona, he was disqualified in the semifinals of the C-2 1000 m event.
