= Ke Hua (canoeist) =

Chinese sprint canoer (born 1960)

Ke Hua 柯华
Personal information
- Nationality: Chinese
- Born: 10 March 1960 (age 66) Huangshi, Hubei
- Height: 1.79 m (5 ft 10 in)
- Weight: 80 kg (176 lb)

Sport
- Country: China
- Sport: Canoeing

Ke Hua (simplified Chinese: 柯华; traditional Chinese: 柯華; born 10 March 1960 in Huangshi, Hubei) is a Chinese sprint canoer who competed in the late 1980s. At the 1988 Summer Olympics in Seoul, he was eliminated in the repechages of the C-2 500 m event and eliminated in the semifinals of the C-2 1000 m event.
