= Dariusz Koszykowski =

Polish canoeist

Medal record

Men's canoe sprint

World Championships
Bronze medal – third place	1994 Mexico City	C-2 1000 m

Dariusz Koszykowski (born 22 January 1972) is a Polish sprint canoeist who competed in the early to mid-1990s. He won a bronze medal in the C-2 1000 m event at the 1994 ICF Canoe Sprint World Championships in Mexico City.

Koszykowski also competed in two Summer Olympics, earning his best finish of fourth in the C-2 1000 m semifinal round at Barcelona in 1992. He did not advance to the final round in either Olympics.
