= Strange Dawn =

Japanese anime television series

- First North American DVD volume cover

ストレンジドーン (Sutorenji Dōn)
- Anime television series
- Directed by: Jun'ichi Satō
- Written by: Michiko Yokote
- Music by: Kaoru Wada
- Studio: Hal Film Maker
- Licensed by: Urban Vision Studios
- Original network: WOWOW
- English network: UK: Channel 5
- Original run: July 11, 2000 – September 26, 2000
- Episodes: 13
- Novel

Strange Dawn Special: TV Anime Strange Dawn Side Story
- Written by: Hiroshi Ishizaki
- Published by: Sony Magazines
- Published: August 2000

Strange Dawn (Japanese: ストレンジドーン, Hepburn: Sutorenji Dōn) is a 13-episode anime television series created by Hal Film Maker for Pioneer LDC (now NBCUniversal Entertainment Japan) in 2000. The series follows the adventures of Eri and Yuko after they are transported to a strange world where all the people are very short.

The series aired on Britain's Channel 5 during their Saturday morning children's slot in early 2002 and was later licensed by Urban Vision in North America, and the first two DVD volumes were released. However, the company never had any plans for releasing the final two DVDs in the series. Anime DVD distributor Dybex did release all four volumes on DVD with French and Dutch subtitles.

== Story ==
Two teenage girls (Yuko and Eri) are transported to a magical planet which is dominated by small semi-humans. To the girls surprise they are treated as gods by the little creatures. They learn that princess Alia used her magic-powers to transport them to their world, because they believe Yuko and Eri are the 'protectors' and will end the horrible war that has been going on for years on their planet. However Yuko and Eri try to convince them that they are nothing more but two girls and are no gods, all they want is to go home. They befriend Shall who comes to the decision to protect Yuko and Eri he tells them that Princess Alia was captured right after she summoned them. Shall then leads them into a long journey to find Princess Alia, unfortunately other countries discover the appearance of the two human girls and are doing anything that they can to use them for their own benefit.

== Characters ==
Yuko Miyabe
Voiced by: Kaori Shimizu (Japanese); Donna Burke (English)
One of the human girls transported to the strange planet. Yuko has a big mouth and always says whats on her mind, even if this might hurt other people's feelings. She shows no concern and no interest to the problems of the inhabitants. She only cares about going home and therefore finding Princess Alia. She does not get along with most of the people, especially Eiri, whom she dislikes for her timidness. Although she might seem selfish, she has a kind personality and cares for Eri and the little creatures, but this is only shown occasionally.
Eri Natsuno (Emi in English version)
Voiced by: Shoko Enomoto (Japanese); Alison Noonan (English)
The complete opposite of Yuko. Eri is sensitive and hardly speaks what's on her mind afraid to hurt the feelings of others. Unlike Yuko, Eri does show concern for the troubles in the strange planet and does her best to help them out. Her ideology is that if they are there, they can at least try to help them since they might be stuck there forever. Eri likes to write fantasy stories and throughout her journey, she writes a story based on her own experiences in the world she's in.
Shall
Voiced by: Kentarō Itō (Japanese); Rob Narita (English)
A little man-like creature that guides Yuko and Eri through his planet. He is always serious and keeps to himself. He feels guilty for not being able to protect Princess Alia and there is a rumor among his fellow creatures that he was in fact in love with the princess.
Reca
Voiced by: Kumi Sakuma (Japanese); Virginie Aussedat (English)
A little woman who follows Shall, Eri and Yuko. She is Shall's fiancée but Shall's behavior makes her question if they truly do have a future together. Because of her appearance she gets a lot of attention from men.
Mani
Voiced by: Rie Ishizuka (Japanese); May Tsuji (English)
Reca's best friend who is also secretly in love with Shall but does not want to hurt Reca's feelings by letting people notice this. She becomes close friends with Eri. Many fellow creatures think of her as ugly throughout the story. She gets insulted and thrown around many times but stays calm, nice and logical. She's the emotionally strongest character of the series.
Beret
Voiced by: Mitsuo Iwata (Japanese); Erica Chantel (English)
One of Shall's friend who protects Yuko and Eri. He argues a lot with Jorg and is in love with Yuko, which is only shown in the last couple of episodes.
Jorg
Voiced by: Katsuhiko Kawamoto (Japanese); Raj Ramayya (English)
One of Shall's friend and is hardly ever serious, though he does wish people would take him more seriously.
Princess Alia
Voiced by: Yuri Shiratori
A beautiful princess with magical powers. She is the one that summoned Yuko and Eri to their world and soon after that she was captured and imprisoned. She died during an escape attempt.
Shura
Voiced by: Yasuhiko Nemoto
Shall's brother, who like Shall is very serious. He appears to be in love with Reca. However, he knows she wants to be happy with Shall, and thus takes no action. He eventually seems to fall in love with Levian.
Levian
Voiced by: Masako Katsuki
General of the Valgidan's army. She is very strict and smart but also manipulative. She later on helps Yuko, Eri and their friends to escape. Like Reca, she also gets quite some male attention.
Dall
Voiced by: Susumu Chiba
An extremely jealous, egoistic person who hates Shall for having Reca, who he's in love with, as his fiancée and being seen as a better strategist than himself. He still does try to win Reca over. Later on he becomes responsible for the death of his comrades, calling them 'worthy sacrifices'. He explains he also did this to impress Reca, but it could also be to satisfy his ego.

== Music ==
- Opening theme: "Sora e" ("To the Sky"), performed by Eri Kawai in Japanese and Donna Burke in English
- Ending Theme: "Melody Ni..." ("On the Melody..."), performed by Shoko Enomoto and Kaori Shimizu

== Books ==
Sony Magazines released a novel based on the anime by Hiroshi Ishizaki.

- Strange Dawn Special: TV Anime Strange Dawn Side Story (ストレンジドーンSP(スペシャル)テレビアニメ版STRANGEDAWN外伝, Sutorenji Dōn Supesharu: Terebi Anime-ban Sutorenji Dōn Gaiden)

ISBN 4-7897-1599-X
195 pp., B6, August 2000
