= Gregory Steward =

American sprint canoer (born 1962)

Gregory Steward (born May 3, 1962) is an American sprint canoer who competed in the late 1980s and early 1990s. At the 1988 Summer Olympics in Seoul, he was eliminated in the repechages of the C-2 1000 m event. Four years later in Barcelona, Steward was disqualified in the semifinals of that same event.
