= Gábor Takács =

Hungarian canoeist

Medal record

Men's canoe sprint

World Championships
Silver medal – second place	1989 Plovdiv	C-4 1000 m

Gábor Takács (2 October 1959 – 4 May 2007) was a Hungarian sprint canoer who competed in the late 1980s. He won a silver medal in the C-4 1000 m event at the 1989 ICF Canoe Sprint World Championships in Plovdiv. Takács also finished seventh in the C-2 1000 m event at the 1988 Summer Olympics in Seoul.
