= Petar Bozhilov =

Bulgarian canoeist

Petar Bozhilov (Bulgarian: Петър Божилов; 5 September 1963 – 16 December 2012) was a Bulgarian sprint canoeist who competed in the late 1980s. At the 1988 Summer Olympics in Seoul, paired with Deyan Bonev, he finished fourth in the C-2 500 m event and ninth in the C-2 1000 m event.
