= Park Gyeong-cheol =

South Korean canoeist

Personal information
- Nationality: South Korean
- Born: January 23, 1969 (age 57)

Sport
- Sport: Canoe racing

Korean name
- Hangul: 박경철
- Hanja: 朴景澈
- RR: Bak Gyeongcheol
- MR: Pak Kyŏngch'ŏl

Park Gyeong-cheol (born January 23, 1969) is a South Korean sprint canoer who competed in the late 1980s. At the 1988 Summer Olympics in Seoul, he was eliminated in the repechages in both the C-2 500 m event and the C-2 1000 m event.
