= Air Master =

Japanese manga series

- First tankōbon volume cover

エアマスター (Ea Masutā)
- Genre: Comedy; Martial arts
- Manga
- Written by: Yokusaru Shibata
- Published by: Hakusensha
- Imprint: Jets Comics
- Magazine: Young Animal
- Original run: 1996 – 2006
- Volumes: 28
- Anime television series
- Directed by: Daisuke Nishio
- Produced by: Hiroshi Yamashita; Manabu Tamura; Atsushi Kido
- Written by: Michiko Yokote
- Music by: Yoshihisa Hirano
- Studio: Toei Animation
- Licensed by: Crunchyroll
- Original network: Nippon TV
- Original run: April 2, 2003 – October 1, 2003
- Episodes: 27
- icon

Air Master (Japanese: エアマスター, Hepburn: Ea Masutā) is a Japanese manga series written and illustrated by Yokusaru Shibata. It was serialized in Hakusensha's seinen manga magazine Young Animal from 1996 to 2006, with its chapters collected in 28 tankōbon volumes. The story focuses on Maki Aikawa, an ex-gymnast turned street fighter.

A 27-episode anime television series adaptation animated by Toei Animation was broadcast on Nippon Television from April to October 2003. Originally licensed in North America by Geneon USA (in partnership with Toei), the series saw only partial DVD releases before poor sales canceled the deal. It later became available for streaming on Crunchyroll.

== Plot ==
Beneath Tokyo's daily routines lies a hidden world of street fighters pushing their limits through combat. Among them is Maki Aikawa, a 16-year-old former gymnast who channels her acrobatic prowess into underground fighting. For Maki, only the adrenaline of battle provides a sense of fulfillment. Her athleticism and power earn her the nickname moniker "Air Master" as she defeats successive opponents. Her skills eventually draw her into the Fukamichi Rankings, a league featuring 44 of the world's most dangerous fighters.

The Rankings serve dual purposes: a proving ground for warriors seeking to test their limits, and a global spectacle with corporate backing, where victors earn prize money. For Maki, it represents the ultimate challenge—a chance to chase the exhilaration of combat while facing the world's most formidable fighters.

== Characters ==
Maki Aikawa (相川 摩季, Aikawa Maki)
Voiced by: Romi Park
Maki, a former gymnast trained by her late mother, combines acrobatics with powerful strikes in combat. She adapts quickly to opponents' techniques and fights with relentless determination. Preferring street fights for thrill over glory, she lives apart from her estranged father. Though physically imposing, she remains reserved among friends while displaying occasional naivety toward admirers. Romantic advances—especially from Julietta Sakamoto—briefly unsettle her. Her signature moves include the "Air Spin Driver", "Air Cutter", and later "Air Flow". Maki also appears in Tojima Wants to Be a Kamen Rider, where she is a martial arts teacher.
Yuu Takigawa (滝川 ユウ, Takigawa Yū)
Voiced by: Mariko Suzuki
Yuu is a friend of Maki and shares some of Renge's interests. An admirer of the singer Uzumi Mika, she practices karate and harbors feelings for Shinnosuke, occasionally clashing with Michiru over him.
Michiru Kawamoto (川本 みちる, Kawamoto Michiru)
Voiced by: Masumi Asano
Michiru, another friend of Maki, develops feelings for Shinnosuke but reacts with dismay when he confesses his affection for Maki. An admirer of the model Nono Rakuko, she forms a close partnership with Yuu, with the two rarely seen separately.
Mina Nakanotani (中ノ谷 美奈, Nakanotani Mina)
Voiced by: Yukana
Mina is a shy private school student and one of Maki's friends, notable for her large bust which causes her embarrassment. She has an obsessive crush on Maki, expressed through physical advances including a kiss and an incident of unconscious sexsomnia, earning teasing from friends. Despite this, she has admirers including Reiishi Mishima and members of Kinjirou's gang. She enjoys Belgian chocolate cake and has been a longtime fan of Nanjou Remon's novels.
Renge Inui (乾 蓮華, Inui Renge)
Voiced by: Tomoko Kaneda
Renge, the shortest member of the group, exhibits an insatiable appetite while remaining thin, though occasionally shown with a distended belly after overeating. She embodies an excitable, childlike personality often prone to whining, though frequently serves as an enthusiastic supporter. Her character possesses supposed psychic abilities and later adopts a constant feline companion. The portrayal received criticism from some fans regarding her vocal mannerisms.
Shiro Saeki (佐伯 四郎, Saeki Shiro)
Voiced by: Toshio Furukawa
Shiro, Maki's estranged father, was 15 when she was born, making him approximately 31 upon introduction. A four-time professional fighting champion, he operates a dōjō and raises Maki's half-sister, Miori. After losing a match to Sakamoto, the two eventually reconcile and form a friendship.
Miori Saeki (佐伯 みおり, Saeki Miori)
Voiced by: Yukiko Hirotsu
Miori, Maki's younger half-sister, inherits some martial arts skill from their father but lacks Maki's acrobatic prowess. Initially hostile, she ambushes Maki during their first meeting. Though younger, she matches Renge in height. Later, she moves in with Maki and develops admiration for Sanpagita Kai.
Kaori Sakiyama (崎山 香織, Sakiyama Kaori)
Voiced by: Mika Doi
Kaori develops an obsessive rivalry with Maki while pursuing modeling. Though initially unskilled, she becomes a capable fighter through sheer determination. Loud and theatrical, she fights with berserker-like endurance until incapacitated. A recurring gag involves characters dramatically using her full name. When enraged, her appearance evokes Devilman. She suffers partial deafness from a high school assault.
Julietta Sakamoto (坂本 ジュリエッタ, Sakamoto Jurietta)
Voiced by: Kenyu Horiuchi
Sakamoto, a ghostwriter obsessed with Maki (calling her "My Jenny"), relentlessly pursues her despite her disgust. Known for fighting hands-free with brutal kicks, his legendary endurance lets him battle through severe injuries. He ranks seventh in the Fukamichi Rankings after one-kicking Nobuhiko. Ironically, while ignoring admirers like singer Uzumi Mika and model Nono Rakuko, he fixates on unwilling Maki.
Kinjiro Kitaeda (北枝 金次郎, Kitaeda Kinjirō)
Voiced by: Kentarō Itō
Kinjiro leads the "League of Black-suited Gentlemen", claiming to hate women yet making an exception for Maki. His powerful punches can fell a bear, and he employs an afterimage technique to bait opponents. Ranked ninth in Fukamichi's rankings, he had his first kiss taken by subordinate Nagato during a fight.
Kai Sanpagita (サンパギータ・カイ, Sanpagīta Kai)
Voiced by: Michie Ishizuka
Though not part of Maki's initial street-fighting circuit, she becomes one of her toughest opponents. Trained by her brother Lucha Master, Kai shares Maki's acrobatic style and faces her in a women's wrestling tournament, developing an obsessive rivalry. Ranked ninth in the Fukamichi Rankings after defeating Shun Yashiki, she later falls to tenth after losing to Kinjiro Kitaeda. Her signature techniques include the learned "Izakaya Bomber" and her original "Ultimate Sky Screwbomb".
Shinnosuke Tokita (時田 伸之助, Tokita Shinnosuke)
Voiced by: Tomokazu Seki
Shinnosuke initially challenges Maki before briefly joining her group, displaying apparent romantic interest in her. Trained since age five with a staff that converts into a three-section staff, he demonstrates some kung fu knowledge. He gains an advantage over Reiichi in combat until Tsukio intervenes with his "Jack Hammer Punch".
Lucha Master (ルチャマスター, Rucha Masutā)
Voiced by: Unshō Ishizuka
Lucha Master, a masked Mexican-style wrestler, serves as Maki's first major opponent and one of only three fighters matching her aerial combat skills. The older brother of Sampaguita Kai, he ranks twenty-first in the Fukamichi Rankings.
Tsukio Taketsugu (武 月雄, Taketsugu Tsukio)
Voiced by: Kihachiro Uemura
Tsukio, a construction worker with a jackhammer-like punch (though slower than most street fighters), becomes an early opponent. Overshadowed by Lucha Master's sudden arrival, he harbors lingering frustration. He holds twenty-second place in the Fukamichi Rankings.
Reiichi Mishima (三島麗一, Mishima Reiichi)
Voiced by: Daisuke Sakaguchi
Reiichi, Tsukio's clumsy companion, fights moderately well but excels only on a bicycle, wielding it like an extension of himself. Obsessed with Mina Nakanotani, he briefly defends her from Kinjiro's gang before being overpowered and relinquishing leadership to stronger fighters.
Fukamichi (深道)
Voiced by: Takehito Koyasu
Fukamichi organizes the street-fighting tournament and its ranking system, vetting participants while broadcasting fights globally. Though non-combatant, he displays exceptional strength and speed. His brother Nobuhiko competes using weaponized fireworks. A food critic in his spare time, Fukamichi ultimately reveals his rankings were designed to assemble warriors capable of defeating Eternal, the top-ranked fighter.
Shun Yashiki (屋敷 俊, Yashiki Shun)
Voiced by: Kazunari Tanaka
Shun Yashiki, Tsukio's cousin, initially ranked ninth in the Fukamichi Tournament before losing to Kai. A ki manipulator, his signature "osmotic punch" uses life energy to induce internal pressure, forcibly expelling fluids from opponents. This draining technique has limited uses before requiring rest. He later teaches it to Kaori Sakiyama.
Yuki Minaguchi (皆口 由紀, Minaguchi Yuki)
Voiced by: Mami Koyama
Yuki, ranked fourth and titled "The Strongest Woman" in the Fukamichi Rankings, specializes in counterattacks and hand-based cutting/stabbing techniques. The second fighter to defeat Maki, she maintains a calm demeanor despite her evident love of combat. Her fate is implied to be fatal after Eternal knocks her unconscious during the tournament's collapse, leaving her unable to escape the crumbling arena.
Yoshinori Konishi (小西 良徳, Konishi Yoshinori)
Voiced by: Katsuyuki Konishi
Yoshinori, the Fukamichi Rankings' third-place fighter, specializes in grappling and submission holds, considering himself a perfected martial artist. He dominates Shiro Saeki in a submission match and eventually defeats Sakamoto in combat.
Eternal (渺茫, Byōbō)
Voiced by: Rintarō Nishi
Eternal, the top-ranked fighter in the Fukamichi Rankings, is an enigmatic, seemingly immortal warrior accompanied by a medium who communicates with past "Eternals". His overwhelming strength allows him to demolish buildings with single strikes. Though he easily defeats both Maki and Yuki individually, their combined efforts ultimately overcome him. His fate remains ambiguous after the arena's collapse—either perishing in the wreckage or escaping unseen.

== Media ==
=== Manga ===
Written and illustrated by Yokusaru Shibata, Air Master was serialized in Hakusensha's seinen manga magazine Young Animal from 1996 to 2006. The chapters were collected in 28 tankōbon volumes released from July 29, 1997, to May 29, 2006.

=== Anime ===
A 27-episode anime television series adaptation, produced by Nippon Television, VAP and Toei Animation, was broadcast on Nippon TV from April 2 to October 1, 2003. (Note: Air Master aired on Nippon TV on Tuesday midnight, effectively Wednesday at 0:58 a.m. JST.) The series was directed by Daisuke Nishio, with Michiko Yokote handling series composition, Yoshihiko Umakoshi designing the characters and Yoshihisa Hirano composing the music. The opening theme is "Retsu no Matataki" (烈の瞬), performed by Japaharinet, and the ending theme is "Rolling1000toon", performed by Maximum the Hormone. VAP collected its episodes onto nine DVDs, released from July 24, 2003, and March 24, 2004; each DVD contained three episodes and a bonus yonkoma by Shibata.

In 2004, Geneon Entertainment signed an agreement with Toei to distribute the series in North America. It was also announced that the series would air on the Canadian cable channel Razer, though it never earned a timeslot and was cancelled before broadcast. Ultimately only three DVDs of the series were released in North America, with the fourth and fifth being solicited but cancelled due to an abrupt termination of partnership between the two companies. The DVDs for the series, along with two other Toei titles, received very little advertising and suffered from poor quality, resulting in dismal sales and a large number of returns to Geneon. In 2009, Funimation gained the rights to Air Master and began streaming it on the company's official website, and on Crunchyroll; it was also streamed on Joost.

==== Episodes ====
No.	Title	Directed by	Written by	Original release date
1	"Fly! Air Master"; Transliteration: "Tobe! Ea Masutā" (Japanese: 飛べ！エアマスター)	Toshiaki Komura	Michiko Yokote	April 2, 2003
2	"Howl! Sakiyama Kaori!"; Transliteration: "Hoero! Sakiyama Kaori!!" (Japanese: 吠えろ！崎山香織！！)	Naoyuki Itō	Fumiya Fujii	April 9, 2003
3	"Challenge! Tokita Shinnosuke"; Transliteration: "Idome! Tokita Shinnosuke" (Japanese: 挑め！時田伸之助)	Takahiro Imamura	Mushi Kōhei	April 16, 2003
4	"Stand Out! Tsukio and Reiichi"; Transliteration: "Medate! Tsukio to Reiichi" (Japanese: 目立て！月雄と麗一)	Gō Koga	Fumiya Fujii	April 23, 2003
5	"Sing! Sakamoto Julietta"; Transliteration: "Utae! Sakamoto Jurietta" (Japanese: 唄え！坂本ジュリエッタ)	Takao Yoshizawa	Michiko Yokote	April 30, 2003
6	"Fly With It, Maki!"; Transliteration: "Notteke Maki!" (Japanese: ノッてけ摩季！)	Yutaka Nakajima	Michiko Yokote	May 7, 2003
7	"Don't Make Me Say It Again!"; Transliteration: "Nidoto iwaseru na!" (Japanese: 二度と言わせるな！)	Naoyuki Itō	Michiko Yokote	May 14, 2003
8	"Roar! Nakanotani Mina"; Transliteration: "Todoroke! Nakanotani Mina" (Japanese: 轟け！中ノ谷美奈)	Keisuke Ōnishi	Miu Kawasaki	May 21, 2003
9	"Go! Black Union of Righteousness and Sincerity"; Transliteration: "Susume! Kuro seigi seii rengō" (Japanese: 進め！黒正義誠意連合)	Takahiro Imamura	Mushi Kōhei	May 28, 2003
10	"Burn! Kitaeda Kinjirō"; Transliteration: "Moero! Kitaeda Kinjirō" (Japanese: 燃えろ！北枝金次郎)	Takao Yoshizawa	Mushi Kōhei	June 4, 2003
11	"Overwhelm! Maki vs. Kinjirō"; Transliteration: "Tatamikome! Maki tai Kinjirō" (Japanese: たたみこめ！摩季対金次郎)	Hiroshi Ishiodori	Mushi Kōhei	June 11, 2003
12	"Introducing! Fami-Wrestlers"; Transliteration: "Nanore! Famiresurāzu" (Japanese: 名のれ！ファミレスラーズ)	Yutaka Nakajima	Fumiya Fujii	June 18, 2003
13	"Shine! Sky Star"; Transliteration: "Kagayake! Sukai Sutā" (Japanese: 輝け！スカイスター)	Gō Koga	Fumiya Fujii	June 25, 2003
14	"Pierce Through! Kai and Maki"; Transliteration: "Tsukinukero! Kai to Maki" (Japanese: 突き抜けろ！カイと摩季)	Keisuke Ōnishi	Fumiya Fujii	July 2, 2003
15	"Conquest! Roach Empress!"; Transliteration: "Seifuku Seyo! Jotei Goki" (Japanese: 征服せよ！女帝ゴキ)	Naoyuki Itō	Miu Kawasaki	July 9, 2003
16	"Fight! Fukamichi Ranking"; Transliteration: "Tatakae! Fukamichi rankingu" (Japanese: 戦え！深道ランキング)	Daisuke Nishio	Michiko Yokote	July 16, 2003
17	"Gather! Street Fighters"; Transliteration: "Tsudoe! Sutorīto Faitāzu" (Japanese: 集え！ストリートファイターズ)	Takao Yoshizawa	Michiko Yokote	July 23, 2003
18	"Cosplay! Komada Shigeo"; Transliteration: "Kosupure! Komada Shigeo" (Japanese: コスプれ！駒田シゲオ)	Ken Koyama	Mushi Kōhei	July 30, 2003
19	"Endure! Kouji Ogata"; Transliteration: "Shinobe! Ogata Kōji" (Japanese: 忍べ！尾形小路)	Hiroshi Ishiodori	Miu Kawasaki	August 6, 2003
20	"Collide! Kai vs. Kinjiro"; Transliteration: "Butsukare! Kai tai Kinjirō" (Japanese: ぶつかれ！カイ対金次郎)	Takahiro Imamura	Mushi Kōhei	August 13, 2003
21	"Make Him Talk! Fukamichi's Younger Brother"; Transliteration: "Shaberasero! Fukamichi (otōto)" (Japanese: しゃべらせろ！深道（弟）)	Naoyuki Itō	Miu Kawasaki	August 20, 2003
22	"Shoot It Up! The Flame Ranker"; Transliteration: "Uchiagero! Honō no rankā" (Japanese: 打ち上げろ！炎のランカー)	Gō Koga	Mushi Kōhei	August 27, 2003
23	"Rip It Up! Minaguchi Yuki"; Transliteration: "Kirisake! Minaguchi Yuki" (Japanese: 切り裂け！皆口由紀)	Takao Yoshizawa	Miu Kawasaki; Fumiya Fujii	September 3, 2003
24	"Burn! Meat"; Transliteration: "Yake! Niku" (Japanese: 焼け！肉)	Keisuke Ōnishi	Fumiya Fujii	September 10, 2003
25	"Break! Konishi vs. Julietta"; Transliteration: "Kowase! Konishi tai Jurietta" (Japanese: 壊せ！小西対ジュリエッタ)	Yutaka Nakajima	Michiko Yokote	September 17, 2003
26	"Feel It! The Struggling Wind"; Transliteration: "Kanjiro! Tatakai no Kaze" (Japanese: 感じろ！闘いの風)	Takahiro Imamura	Mushi Kōhei	September 24, 2003
27	"Fly! Aikawa Maki"; Transliteration: "Tobe! Aikawa Maki" (Japanese: 飛べ！相川摩季)	Daisuke Nishio	Michiko Yokote	October 1, 2003

== Reception ==
Erica Friedman reviewed the anime and manga for Okazu. She called the manga "a few shounen Yuri series," calling Aikawa Maki is a "great heroine" with Maki's friend, Mina having a crush on her. She criticized the manga's art for being "distractingly ugly" even as she praised the characters as great. She described the anime as "great" despite the fact that the art is "ugly," arguing that there is a "nice handful of yuri to hold onto" in characters like Mina's love for Maki. She also praised Sakiyama Kaori as "totally psychotic, violent and strange," while also admirable and lovable, and the music score even as she noted the amount of fan service in the series.

== See also ==
- 81diver, another manga series by the same author
- Tojima Wants to Be a Kamen Rider, another manga series by the same author
