= Marek Dopierała =

Polish canoeist

Medal record

Men's canoe sprint

Representing Poland
| Event | 1st | 2nd | 3rd |
|---|---|---|---|
| Olympic Games | 0 | 1 | 1 |
| World Championships | 2 | 3 | 1 |
| Total | 2 | 4 | 2 |

Olympic Games
| Silver medal – second place | 1988 Seoul | C-2 500 m |
| Bronze medal – third place | 1988 Seoul | C-2 1000 m |

World Championships
| Gold medal – first place | 1986 Montreal | C-2 10000 m |
| Gold medal – first place | 1987 Duisburg | C-2 500 m |
| Silver medal – second place | 1985 Mechelen | C-2 500 m |
| Silver medal – second place | 1986 Montreal | C-2 1000 m |
| Silver medal – second place | 1987 Duisburg | C-2 1000 m |
| Bronze medal – third place | 1985 Mechelen | C-2 1000 m |

Marek Franciszek Dopierała (born 30 July 1960 in Bielsko-Biała) is a Polish sprint canoeist who competed during the 1980s. Competing in two Summer Olympics, he won two medals with Marek Łbik at Seoul in 1988 with a silver in the C-2 500 m event and a bronze in the C-2 1000 m event. Honoured Master of Sport of Poland.

Dopierała also won six medals at the ICF Canoe Sprint World Championships with two golds (C-2 500 m: 1987, C-2 10000 m: 1986), three silvers (C-2 500 m: 1985, C-2 1000 m: 1986, 1987), and one bronze (C-2 1000 m: 1985).
