= Tojima Wants to Be a Kamen Rider =

Japanese manga series

- First tankōbon volume cover

東島丹三郎は仮面ライダーになりたい (Tōjima Tanzaburō wa Kamen Raidā ni Naritai)
- Genre: Tokusatsu
- Manga
- Written by: Yokusaru Shibata
- Published by: Hero's Inc.
- English publisher: NA: Titan Manga
- Imprint: Hero's Comics
- Magazine: Monthly Hero's; (May 1, 2018 – October 30, 2020); Comiplex; (November 27, 2020 – present)
- Original run: May 1, 2018 – present
- Volumes: 18
- Anime television series
- Directed by: Takahiro Ikezoe
- Produced by: Kōsuke Yokota
- Written by: Touko Machida
- Music by: TeddyLoid
- Studio: Liden Films
- Licensed by: Crunchyroll; SEA: Medialink
- Original network: Tokyo MX, GYT, GTV, BS11, MBS, CBC, HBC, RKB, AT-X
- English network: Netflix
- Original run: October 5, 2025 – March 21, 2026
- Episodes: 24
- icon

Tojima Wants to Be a Kamen Rider (Note: Japanese: 東島丹三郎は仮面ライダーになりたい, Hepburn: Tōjima Tanzaburō wa Kamen Raidā ni Naritai; lit. 'Tanzaburō Tōjima Wants to Be a Kamen Rider') is a Japanese manga series written and illustrated by Yokusaru Shibata, with cooperation by Toei Company and Ishimori Production. A spinoff of the Kamen Rider franchise, it began serialization in Hero's Inc.'s seinen manga magazine Monthly Hero's in May 2018. After the magazine's disbandment in October 2020, it was transferred to the Comiplex website in November of the same year. An anime television series adaptation produced by Liden Films aired from October 2025 to March 2026.

== Plot ==
As a child, Tanzaburo Tojima was an ardent fan of the Kamen Rider show and aspired to not just emulate Kamen Rider, but to actually become one. Despite realizing the show is fictional and that Kamen Rider and the villain organization Shocker doesn't exist, Tojima continues his physical training in seclusion, but ends up as single, 40 year old construction worker. However, Tojima learns of a recent crime wave where criminals are acting like Shocker, once more reviving his desire to become Kamen Rider.

== Characters ==
The cast of Tojima Wants to be a Kamen Rider

Tanzaburo Tojima (東島 丹三郎, Tōjima Tanzaburō) / "Kamen Rider"
Voiced by: Katsuyuki Konishi, Yūko Sanpei (young) (Japanese); Patrick Seitz, Michele Knotz (young) (English)
A 40-year-old man who is a lifelong fan of Kamen Rider, obsessively training since childhood and dedicating himself to living by the heroic values he learned from the show in the hopes that he could one day become a Kamen Rider himself. Despite being an ordinary human, his training has given him superhuman strength and durability to the point that his "Rider Punch" can stagger a Shocker kaijin. He "transforms" by donning a cheap plastic Kamen Rider #1 mask he bought at a festival.
Yuriko Okada (岡田 ユリコ, Okada Yuriko) / "Electro-Wave Human Tackle"
Voiced by: Ai Kayano (Japanese); Colleen Clinkenbeard, Hannah Alyea (young) (English)
A 24-year-old high school teacher who, as a child, became enamored by Kamen Rider Stronger's Electro-Wave Human Tackle, the franchise's first female hero, when her father showed her the series. Devastated by Tackle's death in the show's 30th episode and wanting to honor her, Yuriko began intense physical training and made her own costume to become Tackle.
Ichiyo Shimamura (島村 一葉, Shimamura Ichiyo) / "Kamen Rider V3"
Voiced by: Kenichi Suzumura, Natsumi Fujiwara(young) (Japanese); Chris Hackney (English)
A 32-year-old man who, as a child, witnessed the Bat Man murdering his grandparents, vowing revenge against Shocker and using Kamen Rider V3 as inspiration. He insists V3 is the strongest Rider and has trained himself in multiple martial arts to embody V3 as deeply as possible. Unlike the others, he does not don any kind of costume to "transform," claiming that he does not need to because his "soul is V3." He rides a bicycle resembling the ones ridden by the members of the Kamen Rider Scouts of Kamen Rider V3.
Mitsuba Shimamura (島村 三葉, Shimamura Mitsuba) / "Riderman"
Voiced by: Soma Saito, Kanna Nakamura (young) (Japanese); Jonathan Lim, Jennifer Alyx (young) (English)
Ichiyo's 27-year-old younger brother and the manager of a family restaurant who also witnessed his grandparents' murder at the hands of the Bat Man. He and Ichiyo fought multiple times to decide who would be Kamen Rider V3, with Ichiyo ultimately winning and dubbing Mitsuba Riderman, V3's partner. Originally resentful, Mitsuba later came to admire Riderman's wits and determination. Mitsuba dons a replica Riderman helmet and utilizes both aikido and a functional Rope Arm of his own creation, which can also fire nets and smoke.
Yukarisu (ユカリス)
Voiced by: Fairouz Ai (Japanese); Laura Faverty (English)
Mitsuba's possessive girlfriend who is in truth a Shocker Combatant originally sent to spy on him, though she soon genuinely falls deeply in love with Mitsuba, which allows her to break Shocker's brainwashing. Despite no longer being brainwashed, she is still able to receive psychic signals from other Combatants. She does not remember anything of her life before becoming a Combatant, but is sure the Bat Man was the one who converted her. Like all Combatants, she transforms into her Combatant form by performing the Shocker salute and shouting "Yeee!" (イーッ, Ī).
Futaba Shimamura (島村 二葉, Shimamura Futaba)
Voiced by: Ami Koshimizu (Japanese); Robin Clayton (English)
The middle Shimamura sibling who owns an izakaya. She is deeply resentful of Ichiyo because his fanatical V3 obsession drove people away, causing Futaba to grow up bitter and friendless. Her loneliness and hatred drives her to learn martial arts under Tiger Master with the goal of one day killing Ichiyo. She does not care for Kamen Rider and refuses to involve herself in the group's antics. She initially believes the group to just be immature kidults playing pretend and threatens them not to cause trouble in her bar. A later encounter with the Spider Man makes her realize her siblings' frequent claims of Shocker being real were true, which allows her to reconcile with Mitsuba. However, she maintains her deep resentment of Ichiyo, insisting that knowing the truth does not excuse his behavior.
Hachirō Nakao (中尾 八郎, Nakao Hachirō)
Voiced by: Kenjiro Tsuda (Japanese); Jason Douglas (English)
A 44-year-old yakuza member who is also a Kamen Rider fan, but admires the villainous Shocker rather than the heroic Riders. His father was an ambitious taiyaki stand owner who fell deep into debt and disappeared when Hachirō was young, which made him lose faith in heroes like Kamen Rider. His adoration of Shocker inspires him to lead a series of robberies where he forces his underlings to dress and act like Shocker Combatants. He is eventually killed by the Spider Man and begs to join Shocker with his dying breaths. He wakes up later as a Shocker Combatant, but finds he is free from brainwashing simply because the Spider Man forgot. Hachirō later allies himself with the heroes and begs them for training when the Bat Man targets and seemingly kills his underlings. Like all Combatants, he transforms into his Combatant form by performing the Shocker salute and shouting "Yeee!" His training allows him to develop his own special move, a punch he dubs ".44 Magnum."
Satoshi Itō (伊藤 さとし, Itō Satoshi), Fukushi Ishige (石毛 ふくし, Ishige Fukushi), Daisuke Sato (佐藤 だいすけ, Sato Daisuke)
Satoshi Itō Voiced by: Satoshi Tsuruoka (Japanese); Jack Reeder (English)
Fukushi Ishige Voiced by: Fukushi Ochiai (Japanese); William Ofoegbu (English)
Daisuke Sato Voiced by: Daisuke Sakaguchi (Japanese); Kevin D. Thelwell (English)
Hachirō Nakao's "boys," young henchmen who loyally follow their aniki even after their yakuza family is slaughtered by the Spider Man. They are dedicated fans of the pop idol group Combat Girls and take up part time jobs as security guards both to get closer to their idols and to help support Hachirō. They are converted into Shocker Combatants after being captured by the Bat Man's idol Combatants, but Hachirō's love-filled .44 Magnum punches break their brainwashing.
Su Kumota (雲田 巣) / "Spider Man" (蜘蛛男, Kumo Otoko)
Voiced by: Koki Uchiyama; Landon McDonald (English)
A Shocker monster whose human disguise is a thin, pale man with silver hair. In his kaijin form, Kumota is able to spit webbing and darts that are able to dissolve the bodies of fallen Combatants. Disturbed and fascinated by the strength humans seem to have, he befriends and starts living with Sena Seta and develops a rivalry with Hachiro Hakkyoku, seeking to understand the "core" that allows humans to develop seemingly superhuman abilities.
Kouda Morio (幸田 森男) / "Bat Man" (蝙蝠男, Kōmori Otoko)
Voiced by: Hiroyuki Yoshino (Japanese); Van Barr Jr. (English)
A Shocker monster and the murderer of the Shimamura siblings' grandparents. In his human form, he resembles a man with pointed ears and sharp teeth. He becomes the owner/manager of several idol groups, particularly Combat Girls, using their popularity to indoctrinate their fans into Shocker. He is able to fly and convert humans into Shocker Combatants under his control by biting them as well as power up Shocker converts by feeding them his blood.
"Thunder Raiko" (サンダーライコ, Sandā Raiko)
Voiced by: Akeno Watanabe
A former professional wrestler who was converted into a Shocker Combatant and tasked with hunting down Combatants who have been marked as traitors to the organization because their brainwashing has worn off. She believes that if she kills enough traitors, she will be rewarded with the opportunity to become a kaijin.
Maki Aikawa (相川 摩季, Aikawa Maki) / "Tiger Master" (虎師匠, Tora Masutā)
Voiced by: Romi Park
A former gymnast, street fighter, and police officer who owns a dojo and wears a mask. While working as a police officer, she violently took down several yakuza members, which made her a target and forced her to adopt the Tiger Master identity. She later opened the dojo so children could hone their bodies and martial arts skills, eventually becoming Futaba's teacher. Her true identity is Maki Aikawa, the protagonist of Air Master.
Sena Seta (瀬田 セナ, Seta Sena) / "Heavy Chop" (ヘビーチョップ, Hebīchoppu)
Voiced by: Eri Inagawa (Japanese); Ariel Graham (English)
A former member of an idol group whose gluttonous addiction to ramen and resulting obesity frequently frustrated her group mates. She encounters Kumota by chance and they begin living together after she becomes infatuated with his apparent chūnibyō personality. She posts internet videos under the masked idol persona Heavy Chop where she dances and gorges herself on ramen.
Hachiro Hakkyoku (八極 八郎, Hakkyoku Hachirō)
Voiced by: Tomokazu Seki (Japanese); Dio Garner (English)
A bajiquan practitioner who met and fell in love with Sena. Recognizing her love for ramen above all things, he promises to one day create the ultimate ramen for her, which leads him on a two year journey across Japan learning ramen techniques. He develops something of a rivalry with Kumota, with the two frequently sparring to quench Hachiro's urge to fight a strong opponent.

== Media ==
=== Manga ===
Written and illustrated by Yokusaru Shibata, Tojima Wants to Be a Kamen Rider began serialization in Hero's Inc.'s seinen manga magazine Monthly Hero's on May 1, 2018. After the final issue of the Monthly Hero's was published on October 30, 2020, the series was transferred to the Comiplex website on November 27 the same year. The series' chapters have been collected into eighteen tankōbon volumes as of May 2026. The series is licensed in English by Titan Comics.

==== Volumes ====
No.	Original release date	Original ISBN	English release date	English ISBN
1	December 5, 2018	978-4-86468-604-4	October 27, 2026	978-1-80618-316-6
2	May 2, 2019	978-4-86468-642-6	February 9, 2027	978-1-80618-507-8
3	September 5, 2019	978-4-86468-669-3	—	—
4	December 5, 2019	978-4-86468-684-6	—	—
5	May 15, 2020	978-4-86468-721-8	—	—
6	August 5, 2020	978-4-86468-737-9	—	—
7	January 9, 2021	978-4-86468-772-0	—	—
8	May 1, 2021	978-4-86468-802-4	—	—
9	September 3, 2021	978-4-86468-828-4	—	—
10	February 4, 2022	978-4-86468-867-3	—	—
11	August 29, 2022	978-4-86468-121-6	—	—
12	February 28, 2023	978-4-86468-159-9	—	—
13	September 5, 2023	978-4-86468-196-4	—	—
14	March 29, 2024	978-4-86468-246-6	—	—
15	September 28, 2024	978-4-86468-289-3	—	—
16	April 4, 2025	978-4-86805-059-9	—	—
17	December 5, 2025	978-4-86805-131-2	—	—
18	May 7, 2026	978-4-86805-178-7	—	—

=== Anime ===
An anime adaptation produced by Aniplex was announced on March 7, 2025, which was later revealed to be a television series that is animated by Liden Films and directed by Takahiro Ikezoe, with series composition by Touko Machida, characters designed by Cindy H. Yamauchi, and music composed by TeddyLoid. The series aired from October 5, 2025, (Note: Tokyo MX and BS11 listed the series premiere on October 4 at 24:30, which is effectively October 5 at 12:30 a.m. JST.) to March 21, 2026, on Tokyo MX and other networks.

The opening theme song is "Wanna be", performed by TeddyLoid featuring Shigeru Matsuzaki and TOPHAMHAT-KYO of FAKE TYPE, while the ending theme song is "One More Time!", performed by TeddyLoid featuring Ryoji Tokito. Crunchyroll licensed the series outside of Asia, and streams it along with an English dub two weeks thereafter. Medialink licensed the series in Southeast Asia.

On September 26, 2025, it was announced that Hiroshi Fujioka would reprise his role as Takashi Hongo a.k.a Kamen Rider 1 in the anime.

To commemorate the broadcast of the second episode, the 30th episode of Kamen Rider Stronger was made available online until noon of October 27, 2025.

==== Episodes ====
No.	Title	Directed by	Storyboarded by	Original release date
1	"Tojima Wants to Be a Kamen Rider!"; Transliteration: "Tōjima Tanzaburō wa Kamen Raidā ni Naritai" (Japanese: 東島丹三郎は仮面ライダーになりたい)	Tetsuya Endō	Takahiro Ikezoe	October 5, 2025
As a child, Tanzaburo Tojima was inspired by the Kamen Rider show and dreamed of becoming an actual Kamen Rider. However, during his high school years, he beats up an entire high school gang to defend a classmate Emily, only to cause Emily to fear him. Despondent that an enemy like Shocker doesn't exist, Tojima continues to train in seclusion until he turns 40. After selling off his collection of Kamen Rider merchandise, Tojima learns of an increasing trend of criminals emulating Shocker combatants as they commit crimes, but writes them off as nothing more than petty thieves rather than the actual Shocker. As Tojima attends a festival, it's revealed that the Shocker crimes are being instigated by a gangster named Hachiro Nakao, who is a fan of Shocker and forces his underlings to emulate Shocker so he can pretend to be a villain from the show. Nakao orders his men to assault one of the festival stall owners as part of a shakedown. Seeing that nobody is willing to help the stall owner, Tojima dons a Kamen Rider mask and beats down the Shocker criminals. Realizing what he has done, Tojima flees the scene. The next day, a woman is angered at the news a Kamen Rider has foiled a Shocker crime, and she intended to be the first Kamen Rider to do so.
2	"I Am Tackle"; Transliteration: "Watashi wa Takkuru" (Japanese: 私はタックル)	Kōji Aritomi	Takahiro Ikezoe	October 12, 2025
24-year-old Yuriko Okada, who grew up admiring Electro-Wave Human Tackle from the show Kamen Rider Stronger, works as a high school teacher while training every day to pursue her career as a real-life Kamen Rider. When she sees Tojima make the news after foiling a Shocker crime, she gets frustrated over not being the first Kamen Rider to appear in public. Meanwhile, Nakao and his underlings pull more Shocker-inspired robberies. As Yuriko is being confessed to by one of her students who is in love with her, she witnesses one such robbery taking place and Tojima showing up to stop them again. Yuriko changes into her Tackle costume, knocks out Tojima before he can steal her spotlight a second time, and beats up Nakao and his men. She tells the student in love with her to keep her secret before fleeing, and her debut as Tackle makes the news. Later, Nakao and his men pull another Shocker robbery as a customer live-streams it, and Tojima and Yuriko race to the scene. A man appears to step in to stop the robbery, and he transforms into an actual Shocker combatant.
3	"I Love the Moment When Hate Turns to Love"; Transliteration: "Kirai ga Suki ni Naru to Sugoku Suki" (Japanese: 嫌いが好きになるとスゴク好き)	Mari Saitō	Takahiro Ikezoe	October 19, 2025
The Shocker combatant reveals he is a real member of the evil organization. After he easily dispatches Nakao and his men, Tojima and Yuriko inadvertently team up to defeat the combatant. A man with silver hair and monstrous facial features appears and disintegrates the defeated combatant and the customer who was live-streaming the incident before leaving; Tojima and Yuriko believe the man to be another Shocker agent. At a local restaurant, Tojima and Yuriko discuss what they just experienced and come to grips with the fact that the organization they once thought was fictional is actually real. They are joined by the restaurant's manager, Mitsuba Shimamura, who tells them of his own encounter with Shocker when he was a child. Before Mitsuba can say more, Yukarisu, his girlfriend and one of the restaurant waitresses, pulls him away to go back to work. Tojima and Yuriko decide to fight against Shocker wherever they may appear. The next day, at the high school where she works, Yuriko is confronted by Yukarisu, who thinks Yuriko is romantically interested in Mitsuba. Yuriko believes Yukarisu is just an overly jealous high school girl, but Yukarisu reveals that she is an undercover Shocker combatant and prepares to kill Yuriko.
4	"Who is the Strongest Kamen Rider?"; Transliteration: "Saikyō no Kamen Raidā wa Dare da" (Japanese: 最強の仮面ライダーは誰だ)	Tarō Kubo	Takahiro Ikezoe	October 26, 2025
Yuriko changes into her Tackle costume and defends herself against Yukarisu, eventually knocking her unconscious. She contacts Tojima, and they meet with Mitsuba, who is devastated to learn his girlfriend is a Shocker combatant. Mitsuba tells the rest of his story from the previous episode: when he and his older brother Ichiyo were little, their grandparents were killed by a Shocker monster during what was at first an ordinary home invasion. In the present, Ichiyo himself appears, having been called by Mitsuba. When Tojima introduces himself as Kamen Rider, he and Ichiyo get into a physical brawl over who the strongest Kamen Rider is, with Ichiyo emulating the fighting style of Kamen Rider V3. Despite Ichiyo's mastery of multiple martial arts, Tojima holds his own against him. When Yukarisu wakes up, Ichiyo's hatred for Shocker drives him to attack her, but Mitsuba protects her, saying even though Yukarisu is a member of Shocker, she is still his girlfriend. Yukarisu is moved by Mitsuba's loyalty, but with her undercover mission now compromised, she reluctantly contacts multiple other Shocker combatants to converge on their location and eliminate Tojima and his allies.
5	"Let Me Be V3 Too"; Transliteration: "Boku ni Mo Buisurī Yarasete yo" (Japanese: 僕にもブイスリーやらせてよ)	Takaaki Suzuki	Takahiro Ikezoe	November 2, 2025
Tojima, Yuriko, and Ichiyo defeat the assembled group of Shocker combatants, much to Yukarisu's surprise. Before Ichiyo can attack Yukarisu, Mitsuba defends her again, and Ichiyo asks him if he intends to marry Yukarisu, though Mitsuba is unable to answer. The silver-haired man that Tojima and Yuriko encountered at the convenience store appears, who Yukarisu identifies as her superior: the Shocker monster named Spider Man. Tojima, Yuriko, and Ichiyo attempt to fight Spider Man, despite his overwhelming strength, while Mitsuba temporarily leaves to retrieve something. As Tojima and his allies fight, Spider Man's appearance becomes more monster-like. Mitsuba returns, wearing a helmet and wielding an arm attachment similar to Riderman from V3, and restrains Spider Man in high-strength wire. Tojima and his allies decide to retreat for now, but Spider Man puts Yukarisu under mind control and forces her to attack Mitsuba. In order to break Spider Man's control, Mitsuba loudly declares his love for Yukarisu and asks her to marry him, returning her to normal. Spider Man breaks out of the wire restraining him and changes into his true form.
6	"Order Some Snacks"; Transliteration: "Tsumami o Chūmonshiro" (Japanese: ツマミを注文しろ)	Ryūta Yamamoto	Kenji Kuroda	November 9, 2025
Spider Man attacks Tojima and the others, but Tojima delivers a Rider Punch that manages to knock Spider Man down. As their fight starts to attract unwanted attention, Spider Man disintegrates the fallen Shocker combatants and retreats. At a bar owned by Ichiyo and Mitsuba's sister Futaba, the group toasts their first major victory over Shocker as well as make Mitsuba and Yukarisu's marriage official; Yukarisu decides to join them in their fight against Shocker. Futaba deeply resents Ichiyo because his lifelong obsession with Kamen Rider has ruined her relationships with other people, but she still congratulates Mitsuba on his marriage. Meanwhile, as a couple of yakuza bosses conduct a drug deal, one boss bets that one of his subordinates can beat the other boss's subordinates in a fight. The first boss's subordinate is Nakao, who easily beats the second boss's subordinates. The second boss brings in one more subordinate for Nakao to fight, who turns out to be Spider Man in his human disguise, going by "Kumota".
7	"Let Me Join Shocker"; Transliteration: "Ore o Shokkā ni Shitekure" (Japanese: 俺をショッカーにしてくれ)	Liden Films	Liden Films	November 16, 2025
Before Nakao and Kumota can fight, several members of a rival gang burst in, gunning down the two yakuza bosses and seemingly killing Kumota as well. Nakao and his underlings escape, but Nakao goes back to avenge his slain boss. He sees Kumota, who is still alive, transform into Spider Man and brutally murder the rival gang members. As Spider Man prepares to kill Nakao to remove all witnesses, Nakao's life flashes before his eyes, and he thinks about his father who went into debt trying to open a taiyaki stand and eventually abandoned him, causing him to believe heroes don't exist. Spider Man pierces Nakao's stomach, and as Nakao dies, he begs Spider Man to let him join Shocker. He later wakes up on a park bench with no injuries or memory of how he got there. When he goes to meet with his underlings, they are all surprised when he does the Shocker salute and transforms into a combatant. With their boss dead, Nakao believes their gang will soon be dissolved, but his underlings say they will continue to follow him. At a nearby taiyaki stand, Nakao sees a couple gang members shaking down the stand owner, who turns out to be Nakao's now elderly father. Nakao is especially moved to action when he works out that the two gang members were part of the rival gang who sent the raid which resulted in the death of his boss. With his Shocker powers, Nakao easily beats up the gang members and protects his father's business without telling him his true identity. When Nakao's actions later makes the news, Tojima and his allies are incredulous that a member of Shocker would act heroically.
8	"What's a Kamen Rider Do When A Dangerous Enemy Appears?"; Transliteration: "Kyōteki ga Arawareta Toki Kamen Raidā wa Dō Suru?" (Japanese: 強敵が現われた時仮面ライダーはどうする？)	Tetsuya Endō	Masao Suzuki	November 23, 2025
As Tojima and the others discuss what to do about the Spider Man, Ichiyo proposes holding a tournament to determine which among them is the strongest and is therefore strong enough to take on the monster. They agree to train over the next ten days and then reconvene. Elsewhere, a female Shocker combatant named Thunder Raiko is hunting down and eliminating other combatants who have overcome their brainwashing. She is nearly defeated by one combatant who proclaims his strength comes from his love for his family. Bat Man intervenes and saves Thunder Raiko, and has her drink his blood to gain more strength. Ten days later, after they have undergone intensive training, Tojima, Yuriko, Mitsuba, and Yukarisu travel to Ichiyo's house in the mountains to take part in the tournament. They draw lots to determine the fighting order, but when Yukarisu refuses to fight against Mitsuba, Ichiyo rearranges the fighting order so that Yukarisu and Tojima face off in the first round.
9	"Show Me your Kamen Rider"; Transliteration: "Omae no Raidā o Misete Miro" (Japanese: お前のライダーを見せてみろ)	Hiroki Itai	Hiroki Itai	November 30, 2025
In the first match of the tournament, Tojima asks Yukarisu to transform into her Shocker combatant form. Once she does so, Tojima defeats her with a single, super-powerful Rider Punch. Following a dramatic show of affection between Mitsuba and the defeated Yukarisu, Ichiyo and Mitsuba face off in the second match. Between Mitsuba's mastery of aikido and Ichiyo's passionate spirit, the two are evenly matched, and Tojima is thrilled by their fighting moves. When Ichiyo pushes Mitsuba to show him his true Kamen Rider spirit, they each channel the spirits and determination of the Kamen Riders they emulate, and Mitsuba defeats his brother for the first time since they were children. In the third match of the tournament, Tojima faces off against Yuriko.
10	"Risk Your Life"; Transliteration: "Inochi o Kakeru no" (Japanese: 命を懸けるの)	Takatoshi Suzuki	Masao Suzuki	December 7, 2025
Tojima and Yuriko begin their match. Yuriko employs various wrestling moves and grapples while Tojima fights using nothing but his sheer physical strength; Yuriko even recognizes that a single Rider Punch could take her out in an instant. As their fight progresses, Yukarisu starts to see them as the real incarnations of Kamen Rider and Tackle. After Yuriko screams out her long-held frustration over Tackle's death in Kamen Rider Stronger, her fight with Tojima continues, but no matter how many times she knocks him down, he keeps getting back up. Remembering the strength and determination Tojima displayed in his fight against Spider Man, Yuriko does the same, delivering one throw after another until Tojima is finally knocked out. As a result of their fight, Tojima is so unresponsive that he's only conscious when he's wearing his Kamen Rider mask. In the fourth and final match of the tournament, Yuriko and Mitsuba face off.
11	"Tackle is the Strongest"; Transliteration: "Ichiban Tsuyoi no wa Takkuru" (Japanese: 一番強いのはタックル)	Misato Takada & Amasawa	Tetsuya Wakano	December 14, 2025
As Tojima recovers from his fight with Yuriko, the final match begins between Yuriko and Mitsuba. Between Yuriko's wrestling moves and Mitsuba's counters, each of them tries to gain the upper hand on the other. When the only way Mitsuba can break free of one of Yuriko's holds is to remove his Riderman helmet, he effectively "de-transforms", allowing Yuriko to defeat him. Yukarisu, enraged that Yuriko hurt Mitsuba, attacks Yuriko, but Yuriko takes her down as well. Having now defeated Tojima, Mitsuba, and Yukarisu, Yuriko challenges Ichiyo to a fight. Ichiyo becomes smitten with Yuriko and professes his love for her. Yuriko, perceiving Ichiyo's advance toward her as accepting her challenge, knocks him out with a single kick and declares herself the strongest Kamen Rider. With the tournament over, Tojima and his allies return to their normal daily lives for now. Elsewhere, Nakao and his underlings attend a concert for an army-themed idol group called the Combat Girls and despite his initial skepticism, develops a crush on the idols. Later that night, Yukarisu warns Mitsuba about Thunder Raiko eliminating other Shocker combatants whose brainwashing has worn off, having learned about it through her telepathic connection to other combatants. Mitsuba once again asserts his promise to protect Yukarisu. Meanwhile, Thunder Raiko continues to prowl the streets for Shocker defectors.
12	"I'll Take All You Riders On"; Transliteration: "Matomete Kakatte Koi Raidā-domo" (Japanese: まとめてかかってこいライダー共)	Koji Aritomi	Tetsuya Endo	December 21, 2025
A week after their tournament, Tojima and his allies return to Futaba's pub to celebrate. Ichiyo reaffirms the feelings he now has for Yuriko and asks for her answer, but she turns him down. Ichiyo says he will keep having feelings for Yuriko, even if she never reciprocates them. As the group enjoys food and drinks, Yukarisu detects the presence of Shocker nearby. Nakao, who happens to be in another section of the pub with his underlings at the same time, also detects Shocker's presence. When they encounter each other in the hallway, Yukarisu believes Nakao has been sent by Shocker to eliminate her. She transforms and attacks him, but Nakao transforms as well and overwhelms Yukarisu with his brute strength. Futaba intervenes, and the fight spills over into Tojima and his allies' private room, prompting their involvement as well. Nakao says he is acting independently of Shocker without being given orders, and he challenges the Kamen Riders to a fight. The Riders work together to incapacitate Nakao, and he de-transforms; Tojima and Yuriko recognize him from the convenience store robberies. Elsewhere in the city, Bat Man and Spider Man meet on a rooftop.
13	"I Will Fight and Die Against Shocker"; Transliteration: "Ore wa Shokkā to Tatakatte Shinu" (Japanese: 俺はショッカーと戦って死ぬ)	Kang Tae-sik	Masao Suzuki	December 28, 2025
As Tojima and his allies discuss what to do about the unconscious Nakao and the mess caused by their fight, Ichiyo suggests they leave through the pub's back door and pay Futaba back for the damages later. This causes a disagreement between him and Tojima, who believes such action to be unbecoming of a Kamen Rider. When Futaba discovers the messy state of the room, Ichiyo runs away, and Futaba chases him down the street and into a wooded clearing. Futaba finally confronts the anger and resentment she has had toward Ichiyo her entire life, and they decide to settle their grudge in a fight. As the two battle, Ichiyo tries to convince Futaba that Shocker exists and was responsible for their grandparents' deaths, but Futaba refuses to listen. When Ichiyo asks Futaba how she got so strong, Futaba says she studied martial arts under a tiger mask-wearing woman calling herself "Tiger Master". Their fight continues, and Ichiyo, unwilling to die against anyone except Shocker, finally defeats Futaba. Recognizing Ichiyo's strength but still refusing to hear his claims about Shocker, Futaba leaves and resolves to fight him again. A few days later, as she serves food at her pub, Futaba overhears a hit job being discussed between Kumota and his employer, with her old teacher Tiger Master as the intended target. She goes to Tiger Master's dojo to warn her and finds her taking a shower. When Kumota shows up to the dojo to assassinate Tiger Master, Futaba confronts him while wearing Tiger Master's mask.
14	"I Want to Learn More About Humans"; Transliteration: "Motto Ningen o Shiritai" (Japanese: もっと人間を知りたい)	Park Si-hu	Hiroki Itai	January 11, 2026
Futaba challenges Kumota but is surprised by how powerful he is. Kumota is equally surprised by Futaba's strength and decides to turn her into a Shocker monster, leading Futaba to believe he's another Kamen Rider-obsessed fan like her brother Ichiyo. Kumota changes into his Spider Man form, and Futaba, realizing she's facing a real monster, runs away. As Spider Man withdraws, Bat Man appears before him. The two monsters disagree over their methods of recruiting more Shocker combatants, with Spider Man suggesting Bat Man draws too much attention by recruiting idol groups. Spider Man decides he wants to learn more about humans. Meanwhile, Futaba goes to Mitsuba and Yukarisu's apartment to tell them what happened, and she realizes Ichiyo was right about Shocker all along. A few days later, Sena Seta, an overweight member of an idol group, goes to a ramen stand. One of her fellow group members, Junko, angrily berates her for ruining the group's public image with her overeating. When Junko leaves, Sena follows her to the group's business office, where she finds Junko, a third member of their group, and several office workers turned into Shocker combatants. Sena runs away in a panic and ends up on a crowded street, where Kumota is getting chewed out by his employer over his failure to assassinate Tiger Master. When Sena sees the employer and his thugs brandishing guns and knives, she screams, drawing the attention of concerned bystanders. Kumota's employer and his thugs withdraw, trampling Sena in the process. Sena regains consciousness some time later, discovers Kumota carrying her in his arms, and becomes infatuated with him.
15	"The Masked Idol, Heavy Chop"; Transliteration: "Fukumen Aidoru 'Hebī Choppu'" (Japanese: 覆面アイドル『ヘビーチョップ』)	Myong Ga Young, Sim Sang-il	Masao Suzuki	January 18, 2026
As thanks for escorting her to her apartment, Sena treats Kumota to a bowl of her favorite ramen. With her fellow idol group members turned into Shocker combatants (which Kumota believes to be Bat Man's doing), Sena thinks her idol career is over, but she continues to make internet videos under her masked idol persona "Heavy Chop". Following this, Sena and Kumota start living together, and Kumota slowly grows accustomed to human life. Days later, a man named Hachiro Hakkyoku shows up at Sena's apartment. Two years prior, Hakkyoku was on the brink of death when Sena offered him some food. To repay Sena's kindness, Hakkyoku set out to find the ultimate ramen and make it for her. With Kumota standing in his way of making the ramen for Sena, Hakkyoku challenges him to a fight. With his bajiquan martial arts, Hakkyoku stands on even footing with Kumota, and Kumota is once again surprised by the strength of humans. Sena tearfully tells them to stop fighting, and Kumota acquiesces. Hakkyoku makes his ramen for Sena and tells her to choose between him and Kumota. Sena thinks the ramen is the best she's ever tasted, and Hakkyoku realizes Sena's love for ramen is greater than her love for either him or Kumota. Kumota finds himself amused by how strange humans can be.
16	"An Imposter Can't Beat the Real Deal"; Transliteration: "Nisemono wa Honmono ni wa Katenai" (Japanese: 偽物は本物には勝てない)	Park Si-hu, Hwang Ii-jin	Hideyo Yamamoto	January 25, 2026
On his way home from work, Tojima runs into the takoyaki stand owner he helped at the festival. Over drinks, Tojima shares with the stand owner his deep desire to be Kamen Rider. Nakao coincidentally joins them, and he warns Tojima to stop interfering with Shocker, pointing out that he and his allies are just pretending to be Kamen Riders while Nakao himself is a real Shocker combatant. Meanwhile, Mitsuba and Yukarisu investigate the Shocker assassin eliminating other combatants whose brainwashing has worn off; one such combatant named Takahashi explains to them that the mind control wears off when combatants experience love. Takahashi is later killed by Thunder Raiko. The next day, Yuriko and Yukarisu run into Thunder Raiko. In her Tackle outfit, Yuriko challenges Thunder Raiko while Yukarisu contacts the others. In the middle of Yuriko and Thunder Raiko's fight, Bat Man (in a human disguise) appears and incapacitates Yuriko. Mitsuba shows up and stops Bat Man from turning Yuriko into a monster. When Bat Man changes into his true form, Mitsuba recognizes him as the monster that killed his grandparents. As Shocker reinforcements appear and overwhelm Mitsuba and Yukarisu, Tojima shows up to support his allies. Realizing they are outnumbered and outmatched, Mitsuba suggests they retreat. Tojima, recalling Nakao's words from before, reluctantly agrees, and Mitsuba creates a smokescreen to aid their escape. Later, Mitsuba patches up Yuriko's injuries and thanks her for protecting Yukarisu. Tojima, ashamed at running away, believes he is not fit to be Kamen Rider.
17	"Everyone in the World Will Join Shocker"; Transliteration: "Sekaijū no Ningen o Shokkā ni Shiteyaru" (Japanese: 世界中の人間をショッカーにしてやる)	Kang Tae-sik, Tomoko Hiramuki	Hideyo Yamamoto	February 1, 2026
Following his encounter with Bat Man, Tojima loses confidence in himself and his dream to become a Kamen Rider. However, after he meets a young boy at a convenience store and overhears him talking to his father about wanting to be a hero, Tojima rewatches some old Kamen Rider episodes, and his confidence and passion for his dream are rekindled. Meanwhile, Nakao's underlings have gotten jobs as security guards for an idol festival where the Combat Girls and other idol groups are performing. When the Combat Girls arrive to the venue, Nakao's underlings meet their manager, who is Bat Man in his human disguise. During the festival, the Combat Girls announce their upcoming concert at the Tokyo Dome. After the festival, Bat Man goes into the dressing room where other idol girls are changing, and he turns them into Shocker combatants by biting their necks. When Nakao's underlings hear the girls screaming and go to investigate, they see Bat Man attacking the idols and the Combat Girls standing nearby. Believing the Combat Girls are in danger, Nakao's underlings burst in to save them, but they reveal themselves to be Shocker combatants. Nakao's underlings run away, and Bat Man orders another trio of Shocker idols to go after them and kill them. The idols' pursuit of Nakao's underlings eventually leads back to Nakao's apartment.
18	"I'll Fight Shocker, Too"; Transliteration: "Ore mo Shokkā to Tatakau" (Japanese: 俺もショッカーと戦う)	Myong Ga Young, Sim Sang-il	Kaori Higuchi	February 8, 2026
Nakao tries to explain to the Shocker idols that he's a fellow combatant, but they refuse to listen. Nakao and his underlings flee from the apartment and run into Tojima. After Tojima knocks the idols out, Nakao asks him if he and his underlings can hide out at his place since Nakao's apartment is no longer safe; Tojima reluctantly agrees. The next day, Tojima informs Mitsuba and Yukarisu that Shocker has infiltrated the entertainment industry by turning idols into combatants and that they and the other Kamen Riders must work together to defeat them. Meanwhile, Kumota continues to train with Hakkyoku, learning that humans' strength comes from the passion in their hearts. That night, a large group of Shocker idols tracks down Nakao and his underlings at Tojima's residence. Nakao's underlings sacrifice themselves to keep the idols distracted while Nakao escapes. When Nakao runs into Tojima on his way back from Mitsuba's restaurant, Thunder Raiko appears to kill Nakao for his desertion. She orders the idols to withdraw, saying she'll be made into a monster after killing 100 Shocker traitors. Before Thunder Raiko can kill Nakao, Tojima challenges her, resisting her attacks before knocking her unconscious with a Rider Punch. Realizing he was wrong about Tojima, Nakao decides to fight Shocker alongside him and asks Tojima to train him so he can get stronger. Back at Tojima's residence, Nakao's underlings are still alive but badly beaten. When they express a desire to join Shocker like Nakao, Bat Man appears before them to grant their wish.
19	"I'd Be Honored to Die as a Rider"; Transliteration: "Raidā to Shite Shinerunara Honmō" (Japanese: ライダーとして死ねるなら本望)	Yang Jung Hee, Hwang Ii-jin, Ji Yang Ho	Kenji Setou	February 15, 2026
Tojima and Nakao go to Ichiyo's mountain home to lay low out of Shocker's sights. Ichiyo, having heard from Mitsuba that Yuriko was injured in the fight against Bat Man, takes his anger out on Tojima, and the two of them have a brawl. After Nakao breaks up their fight, he and Tojima explain the situation to Ichiyo and ask him to train them to get stronger. Meanwhile, Mitsuba and Yukarisu gather information on Bat Man and the Combat Girls, and they learn of an upcoming live event that is exclusively for male attendees. The next day, Tojima, Ichiyo, and Nakao train in the woods around Ichiyo's home, with Tojima and Ichiyo far outpacing Nakao's stamina as a Shocker combatant. That night, the three of them share childhood stories of growing up with the Kamen Rider franchise. Nakao realizes Tojima and Ichiyo's passion for being Kamen Riders goes beyond just pretending, and Tojima and Ichiyo agree that it would be an honor to die as Kamen Riders. Elsewhere, Yuriko continues to train and work out despite her leg injury.
20	"I Was Craving a Fight with Shocker"; Transliteration: "Chōdo Shokkā to Tatakai Takatta" (Japanese: ちょうどショッカーと戦いたかった)	Kang Tae-Sik	Masao Suzuki	February 22, 2026
Tojima, Ichiyo, and Nakao continue to train, but Nakao is unable to keep up with the others due to his inexperience. As part of his training, Nakao is pitted against an old Shamo chicken that Ichiyo's family raised for cockfighting, but he fails to defeat it in battle. Realizing his own shortcomings, Nakao has a sparring match with Tojima and eventually manages to beat the chicken in a fight. He vows to get strong enough to take down Shocker for the sake of his underlings. Later, in the middle of the night, Thunder Raiko appears outside Ichiyo's house, having tracked down Nakao into the mountains, and Nakao prepares to fight her. Meanwhile, Mitsuba and Yukarisu infiltrate the Combat Girls' male-only live event, with Yukarisu disguising herself as a man. The event is revealed to be a cover for recruiting all the attendees into Shocker's ranks, and Mitsuba and Yukarisu's presence is discovered by Shocker idols.
21	"Becoming the Ultimate Monster"; Transliteration: "Saikyō no Kaijin ni Naru" (Japanese: 最強の怪人になる)	Norifumi Okuno	Kenji Seto	March 1, 2026
Using a smokescreen, Mitsuba and Yukarisu escape the event venue. The two later investigate the Combat Girls' agency, where Bat Man and the idols under his control are bathing together, and learn of the Combat Girls' upcoming concert at the Tokyo Dome, believing they plan to make an entire arena full of people into more combatants. Meanwhile, thanks to his training under Tojima and Ichiyo, Nakao is able to defeat Thunder Raiko with a single punch. While unconscious, Raiko dreams about her pro wrestling career prior to joining Shocker. When she wakes up, she is in disbelief that ordinary humans were able to defeat her. Nakao offers Raiko food and says he was a big fan of hers during her pro wrestling days. Raiko accepts Nakao's offer and even joins him, Tojima, and Ichiyo's training regimen but is still determined to kill them. Nakao develops feelings for Raiko over time, and after several days of training, he passionately professes his love to her. However, Raiko refuses to abandon her goal of becoming the strongest monster in Shocker, and she beats up Nakao even as he makes his feelings known over and over. Raiko ultimately rejects Nakao's feelings because she considers him to be too old for her, and she runs away flustered.
22	"Shocker is On the Move"; Transliteration: "Shokkā ga Ugokidashita" (Japanese: ショッカーが動き出した)	Kang Tae-Sik, Park Si-Hoo, Yang Jung-Hee	Liden Films	March 8, 2026
As Nakao vents his heartbreak over Thunder Raiko rejecting his feelings, Mitsuba and Yukarisu arrive to alert their allies of Shocker's movements. They go to Futaba's pub to discuss their plan to infiltrate the Combat Girls' upcoming concert. Yuriko, having recovered from her injuries, joins them. Futaba even offers the team some words of support while serving them drinks. Meanwhile, as Kumota continues his training with Hakkyoku, Bat Man appears; Kumota shares what he's learned about humans and warns Bat Man not to underestimate them. Days later, as the Combat Girls' concert gets underway, Tojima and his allies sneak into the concert venue, with Nakao and Yukarisu disguised as Shocker delivery crew, Mitsuba and Yuriko hiding inside the delivery cases, and Tojima and Ichiyo sneaking in from the roof. Nakao and Yukarisu get past security, but once inside, they run into Nakao's underlings. Nakao is initially overjoyed to see them still alive, but he is shocked to discover they have been turned into Shocker combatants under Bat Man's control.
23	"Let's Do This, Shocker!"; Transliteration: "Ikuzo!! Shokkā!!!!" (Japanese: 行くぞ！！ ショッカー！！！！)	Lee Jong-Hyun	Hideyo Yamamoto	March 15, 2026
As Nakao's underlings and additional Shocker combatants overwhelm Nakao and Yukarisu, Yuriko and Mitsuba come out of hiding to dispatch the reinforcements, and Nakao is able to break his underlings' brainwashing. No longer under Bat Man's control, they lead the Kamen Riders to the concert stage, but they run into Thunder Raiko. Yuriko challenges Raiko to a rematch while the others go on ahead. Despite Raiko being even stronger than before, Yuriko successfully defeats her, and she acknowledges the strength of Yuriko's resolve. Meanwhile, as Tojima and Ichiyo wait in position on the roof, Kumota appears before them; Tojima and Ichiyo believe he is working together with Bat Man, but he says he is only interested in seeing what happens. As the Combat Girls' concert wraps up, Bat Man appears on the stage. Before he and his forces can turn the audience members into Shocker combatants, the Kamen Riders and Nakao's underlings evacuate the audience by starting a fire, and Tojima and his allies confront Bat Man on the concert stage. Furious that his plans have been ruined, Bat Man transforms into his true form.
24	"I Wouldn't Mind Dying Today"; Transliteration: "Ore wa Kyō Shinde mo Yoi" (Japanese: 俺は今日死んでも良い)	Masao Suzuki	Myeong Ga-young, Hwang Ii-jin	March 21, 2026
Tojima and his allies begin their battle against Bat Man; despite his monstrous power, the Kamen Riders are able to land several critical hits on him. When Bat Man's army of combatants joins the fight, Yuriko, Yukarisu, and Nakao's underlings hold them off while Tojima, Ichiyo, and Mitsuba face Bat Man. Even after he suffers a grievous wound to his chest, Tojima is fueled by his passion for the Kamen Rider series to keep fighting. Appearing to embody the spirit of Kamen Rider 1 himself, Tojima barrages Bat Man with Rider Punches as his allies cheer him on, eventually defeating Bat Man with an explosive Rider Kick. Spider Man, having watched the battle from the sidelines, collects Bat Man's lifeless body and asks if Tojima intends to foil Shocker's world domination plans. When Tojima answers yes, Spider Man laughs as he leaves. A victorious Tojima removes his mask, crying tears of joy. Days later, the Kamen Riders are recovering from their injuries in the hospital when they hear on the news about a new string of Shocker-related robberies being committed, and they immediately spring into action.

== See also ==
- 81diver, another manga series by the same author
- Air Master, another manga series by the same author
