= Aleksandr Gramovich =

Medal record

Men's canoe sprint

Representing Soviet Union

World Championships
Bronze medal – third place	1990 Poznań	C-2 1000 m

Aleksandr Gramovich (born 17 August 1969 in Mazyr, Byelorussian SSR) is a Soviet-born sprint canoer who competed in the early 1990s. He won a bronze medal in the C-2 1000 m event at the 1990 ICF Canoe Sprint World Championships in Poznań.

Gramovich also finished eighth in the C-2 1000 m event at the 1992 Summer Olympics for the Unified Team.
