= Katsuya Toyama =

Japanese canoeist

Personal information
- Born: July 21, 1967 (age 59) Okinawa, Japan
- Height: 175 cm (5 ft 9 in)
- Weight: 72 kg (159 lb)
Medal record
Men's canoe sprint
Representing Japan
Asian Games
Silver medal – second place	1990 Beijing	C-1 1000 m

Katsuya Toyama (當山克也, Tōyama Katsuya, born July 21, 1967) is a Japanese sprint canoer who competed in the late 1980s and early 1990s. At the 1988 Summer Olympics in Seoul, he was eliminated in the semifinals of the C-2 1000 m event. Four years later in Barcelona, Toyama was eliminated in the semifinals of both the C-2 500 m and the C-2 1000 m events.
