= Attila Pálizs =

Hungarian canoeist

Medal record

Men's canoe sprint

World Championships
Gold medal – first place	1991 Paris	C-2 500 m
Bronze medal – third place	1990 Poznań	C-2 500 m

Attila Pálizs (born April 21, 1967) is a Hungarian sprint canoeist who competed in the early 1990s. He won two medals in the C-2 500 m event at the ICF Canoe Sprint World Championships with a gold in 1991 and a bronze in 1990.

At the 1992 Summer Olympics in Barcelona, Pálizs finished fifth in the C-2 1000 m event and seventh in the C-2 500 m event.
