= Guo Daen =

Chinese canoeist

Personal information
- Native name: 郭大恩
- Nationality: Chinese
- Born: February 28, 1971 (age 55) Wuhan, Hubei, China
- Height: 1.84 m (6 ft 0 in)
- Weight: 76 kg (168 lb)

Sport
- Country: China
- Sport: male sprint canoeist
- Retired: yes
Medal record
Men's canoe sprint
Representing China
Asian Games
Gold medal – first place	1990 Beijing	C-1 1000 m

Guo Daen
- Traditional Chinese: 郭大恩
- Simplified Chinese: 郭大恩
Transcriptions
Standard Mandarin
- Hanyu Pinyin: guō dà ēn

Guo Daen (Chinese: 郭大恩; pinyin: guō dà ēn; born February 28, 1971, in Wuhan, Hubei) is a Chinese sprint canoer who competed in the late 1980s. At the 1988 Summer Olympics in Seoul, he was eliminated in the repechages of the C-2 500 m event and again in the semifinals of the C-2 1000 m event.
