= Marek Łbik =

Polish canoeist

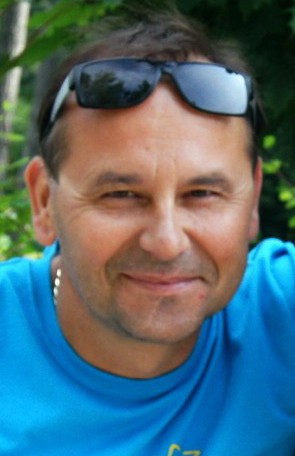

Medal record

Men's canoe sprint
Event	1st	2nd	3rd
Olympic Games	0	1	1
World Championships	2	4	2
European Championships	0	0	0
Total	2	5	3

Olympic Games
Silver medal – second place	1988 Seoul	C-2 500 m
Bronze medal – third place	1988 Seoul	C-2 1000 m

World Championships
Gold medal – first place	1986 Montreal	C-2 10000 m
Gold medal – first place	1987 Duisburg	C-2 500 m
Silver medal – second place	1985 Mechelen	C-2 500 m
Silver medal – second place	1986 Montreal	C-2 1000 m
Silver medal – second place	1987 Duisburg	C-2 1000 m
Silver medal – second place	1989 Plovdiv	C-2 500 m
Bronze medal – third place	1979 Duisburg	C-2 500 m
Bronze medal – third place	1985 Mechelen	C-2 1000 m

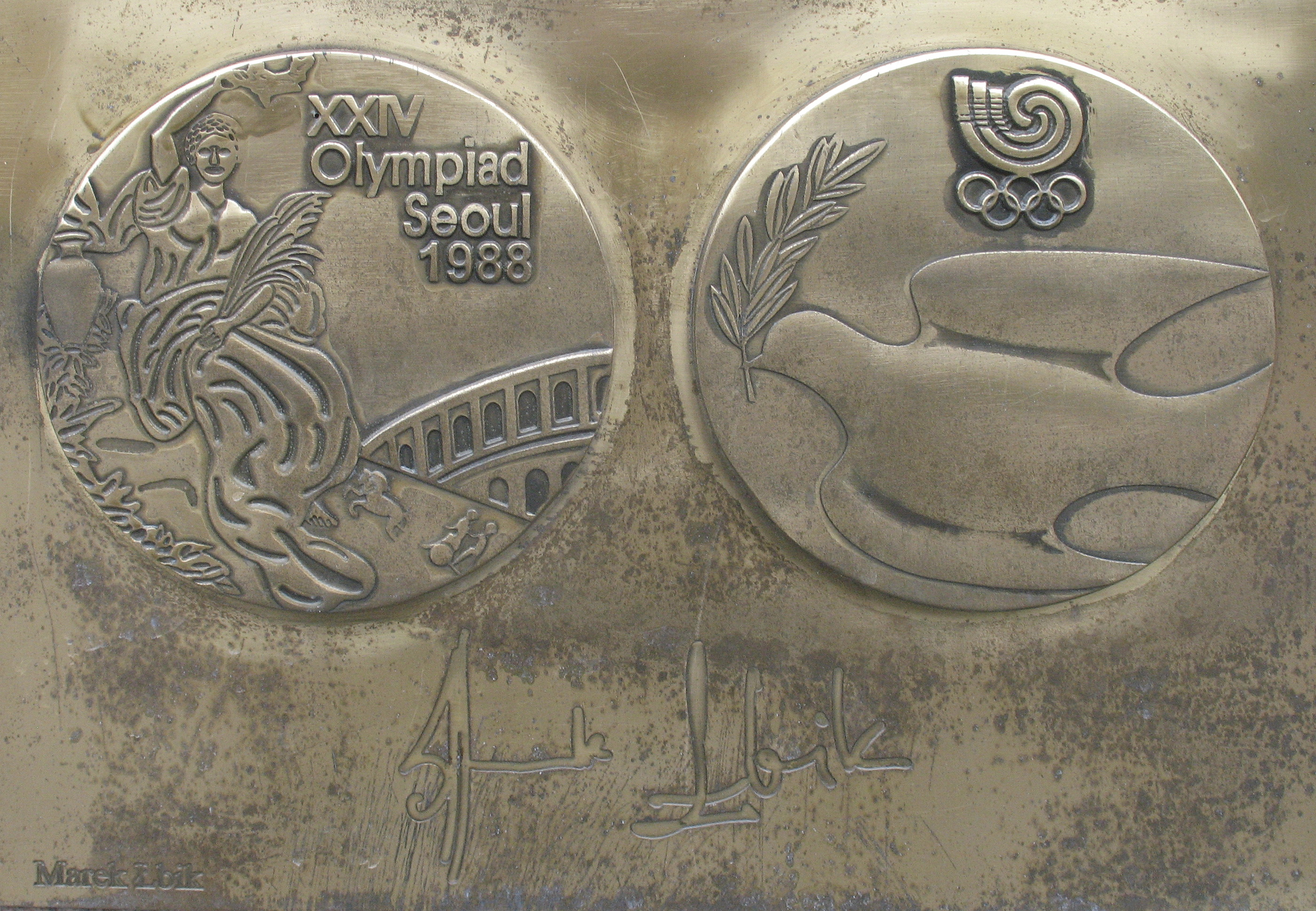
Copy of M. Łbik medal and autograph in Sports Star Avenue in Dziwnów

Marek Łbik (born 30 January 1958 in Poznań) is a Polish sprint canoeist who competed from the late 1970s to the late 1980s. Competing in two Summer Olympics, he won two medals with Marek Dopierała at Seoul in 1988 with a silver in the C-2 500 m event and a bronze in the C-2 1000 m event.

Łbik also won eight medals at the ICF Canoe Sprint World Championships with two golds (C-2 500 m: 1987, C-2 10000 m: 1986), four silvers (C-2 500 m: 1985, 1987; C-2 1000 m: 1987, 1989), and two bronzes (C-2 500 m: 1979, C-2 1000 m: 1985).

He is current chairman of Polish sports club Warta Poznań.
