= Rie Ishizuka =

Japanese voice actress (born 1964)

- 石塚 理恵
- Born: April 23, 1964 (age 62); Shizuoka, Japan
- Occupation: Voice actress
- Years active: 1986–present
- Height: 160 cm (5 ft 3 in)

Rie Ishizuka (石塚 理恵, Ishizuka Rie; born 23 April 1964 in Shizuoka) is a Japanese voice actress who works for Theatrical Group EN.

== Filmography ==
=== Television animation ===
- Strange Dawn (2000) (Mani)
- Demon Lord Dante (2002) (Saeko Kodai/Medusa)
- Princess Tutu (2002) (Ebine)
- Air Master (2003) (Sampaguita Kai)
- Hikaru no Go (2003) (Tamako-sensei, Tetsuo Kaga (child))
- Monster (2004) (Antonin)
- Tetsujin 28-go (2004) (Takamizawa)
- Claymore (2007) (Undine)
- Shangri-La (2009) (Sayoko)
- Keep Your Hands Off Eizouken! (2020) (Asakusa's mother)

=== Theatrical animation ===
- Gundress (1999) (Arisa Takakura)

=== Dubbing ===
==== Live-action ====
- Drew Barrymore
  - Charlie's Angels (2003 TV Asahi edition) (Dylan Sanders)
  - Donnie Darko (Karen Pomeroy)
  - Riding in Cars with Boys (Beverly Donofrio)
  - Confessions of a Dangerous Mind (Penny Pacino)
  - Charlie's Angels: Full Throttle (2006 TV Asahi edition) (Dylan Sanders)
  - Duplex (Nancy Kendricks)
  - Music and Lyrics (Sophie Fisher)
  - He's Just Not That Into You (Mary Harris)
  - Going the Distance (Erin Rankin Langford)
  - Big Miracle (Rachel Kramer)
  - Miss You Already (Jess)
  - Santa Clarita Diet (Sheila Hammond)
  - The Stand In (Paula / Candy Black)
  - A Castle for Christmas (Drew Barrymore)
- 10 Things I Hate About You (Bianca Stratford (Larisa Oleynik))
- The Adventures of Rocky and Bullwinkle (Karen Sympathy (Piper Perabo))
- The Adventures of Swiss Family Robinson (1998 TV) (Emily Chen)
- The Adventurers (Red Ye (Shu Qi))
- All the Pretty Horses (Alejandra Villarreal (Penélope Cruz))
- American Pie (Vicki Lathum (Tara Reid))
- American Pie 2 (Vicki Lathum (Tara Reid))
- American Reunion (Vicki Lathum (Tara Reid))
- Armageddon (2002 Fuji TV edition) (Grace Stamper (Liv Tyler))
- Batman & Robin (2000 TV Asahi edition) (Barbara Wilson (Alicia Silverstone))
- Bedazzled (Alison Gardner / Nicole Delarusso (Frances O'Connor))
- The Big Lebowski (Blu-Ray edition) (Bunny Lebowski (Tara Reid))
- The Bone Collector (2002 TV Asahi edition) (Amelia Donaghy (Angelina Jolie))
- Boys Don't Cry (Lana Tisdel (Chloë Sevigny))
- Bring It On (Torrance Shipman (Kirsten Dunst))
- Bubble Boy (Chloe (Marley Shelton))
- Case 39 (Emily Jenkins (Renée Zellweger))
- Dae Jang Geum (Yun Yeong-roh)
- Dark Angel (TV version dub) (Cindy (Valarie Rae Miller))
- Dark City (Emma Murdoch (Jennifer Connelly))
- Devil's Knot (Pamela Hobbs (Reese Witherspoon))
- Frank of Ireland (Mary (Pom Boyd))
- Ghostbusters (Jennifer Lynch (Cecily Strong))
- Go (Claire Montgomery (Katie Holmes))
- Godmothered (Eleanor (Jillian Bell))
- Gone Baby Gone (Angie Gennaro (Michelle Monaghan))
- The Great Gatsby (Daisy Buchanan (Mia Farrow))
- Grey's Anatomy (Dr. Isobel "Izzie" Stevens (Katherine Heigl))
- Harsh Realm (Sophie Green (Samantha Mathis))
- Hitch (Casey Sedgewick (Julie Ann Emery))
- Just like Heaven (Abby Brody (Dina Spybey))
- Kate & Leopold (Kate McKay (Meg Ryan))
- Killers (Jen Kornfeldt (Katherine Heigl))
- Life as We Know It (Holly Berenson (Katherine Heigl))
- Meet Dave (Number 3 (Gabrielle Union))
- A Midsummer Night's Dream (Helena (Calista Flockhart))
- Mission: Impossible 2 (Nyah Nordoff-Hall (Thandie Newton))
- Models Inc. (Sarah Owens (Cassidy Rae))
- Mojin: The Lost Legend (Shirley Yang (Shu Qi))
- Monsoon Wedding (Aditi (Vasundhara Das))
- The Mummy (Evelyn Carnahan (Rachel Weisz))
- The Mummy Returns (Evelyn Carnahan-O'Connel (Rachel Weisz))
- My Blueberry Nights (Sue Lynne Copeland (Rachel Weisz))
- Nanny McPhee and the Big Bang (Isabel Green (Maggie Gyllenhaal))
- On Her Majesty's Secret Service (Tracy di Vicenzo (Diana Rigg)) (DVD/Blu-Ray release)
- Ouija: Origin of Evil (Alice Zander (Elizabeth Reaser))
- Paddington 2 (Mary Brown (Sally Hawkins))
- Rumor Has It (Sarah Huttinger (Jennifer Aniston))
- Sabrina the Teenage Witch (Sabrina Spellman (Melissa Joan Hart))
- A Scanner Darkly (Donna Hawthorne (Winona Ryder))
- Scarface (2004 DVD edition) (Elvira Hancock (Michelle Pfeiffer))
- Shallow Hal (Jill (Susan Ward))
- Sherlock (Mary Morstan (Amanda Abbington))
- Sonic the Hedgehog (Longclaw)
- Sonic the Hedgehog 2 (Longclaw)
- Stargate Atlantis (Teyla Emmagan (Rachel Luttrell))
- Suddenly Susan (Susan Keene (Brooke Shields))
- Suits (Samantha Wheeler (Katherine Heigl))
- Star Trek: Deep Space Nine (Ezri Dax (Nicole de Boer))
- Torchwood (Gwen Cooper (Eve Myles))
- The Tuxedo (Delilah "Del" Blaine (Jennifer Love Hewitt))
- Van Helsing (Aleera (Elena Anaya))
- The Waterboy (Vicki Vallencourt (Fairuza Balk))
- The West Wing (Ellie Bartlet (Nina Siemaszko))
- Winter Sonata (Chong-a)
- Wolfe (Dot (Amanda Abbington))
- Younger (Maggie Amato (Debi Mazar))

==== Animation ====
- Isle of Dogs (Assistant Scientist (Yoko Ono))
