= Alexander Schuck =

East German canoeist

Medal record

Men's canoe sprint

World Championships
Gold medal – first place	1985 Mechelen	C-2 1000 m
Silver medal – second place	1983 Tampere	C-2 1000 m

Alexander Schuck (born 18 May 1957) is an East German canoe sprinter who competed in the 1980s. He won two medals in the C-2 1000 m event at the ICF Canoe Sprint World Championships with a gold in 1985 and a silver in 1983.

Schuck also finished fifth in the C-2 500 m event at the 1988 Summer Olympics in Seoul.

A native of Leipzig, he is married to swimmer Silke Hörner.
