= Joël Bettin =

French canoeist (born 1959)

Medal record

Men's canoe sprint

Olympic Games
Bronze medal – third place	1988 Seoul	C-2 500 m

World Championships
Silver medal – second place	1991 Paris	C-4 500 m
Bronze medal – third place	1989 Plovdiv	C-2 500 m
Bronze medal – third place	1989 Plovdiv	C-4 500 m

Joël Bettin (born 14 december 1966) is a French sprint canoer who competed in the late 1980s and early 1990s. At the 1988 Summer Olympics in Seoul, he won a bronze in the C-2 500 m event.

Bettin also won three medals at the ICF Canoe Sprint World Championships with a silver (C-4 500 m: 1991) and two bronzes (C-2 500 m and C-4 500 m: both 1989).

== Bibliography ==
- Sports-reference.com profile
