= Hartmut Faust =

German canoeist

Medal record

Men's canoe sprint

World Championships
Bronze medal – third place	1986 Montreal	C-2 1000 m

Hartmut Faust (born 16 May 1965) is a West German sprint canoer who competed during the 1980s. He won a bronze medal in the C-2 1000 m event at the 1986 ICF Canoe Sprint World Championships in Montreal.

Faust also competed in two Summer Olympics, earning his best finish of fifth in the C-2 1000 m event at the 1988 Summer Olympics in Seoul.
