= Alan Lohniský =

Czechoslovak sprint canoer (born 1963)

Personal information
- Born: 1 November 1963 (age 62) Vysoké Mýto, Pardubický kraj
- Height: 165 cm (5 ft 5 in)
Medal record
Men's canoe sprint
Representing Czechoslovakia
World Championships
Bronze medal – third place	1987 Duisburg	C-2 500 m

Alan Lohniský (born 1 November 1963) is a Czechoslovak canoe sprinter who competed for Czechoslovakia in the late 1980s. He won a bronze medal in the C-2 500 m event at the 1987 ICF Canoe Sprint World Championships in Duisburg.

Lohniský also finished ninth in the C-2 500 m event at the 1988 Summer Olympics in Seoul.
