= Toshisuke Sakamoto =

Japanese canoeist (born 1965)

Toshisuke Sakamoto (坂本 利介, Sakamoto Toshisuke; born May 24, 1965) is a Japanese sprint canoer who competed in the late 1980s. At the 1988 Summer Olympics in Seoul, he was eliminated in the semifinals of the C-2 1000 m event.
