= Tsunehisa Uchino =

Japanese canoeist

Personal information
- Born: July 4, 1965 (age 61) Nagasaki, Japan
- Height: 173 cm (5 ft 8 in)
- Weight: 73 kg (161 lb)
Medal record
Men's canoe sprint
Representing Japan
Asian Games
Silver medal – second place	1990 Beijing	C-2 1000 m

Tsunehisa Uchino (内野 経久, Uchino Tsunehisa; born July 4, 1965) is a Japanese sprint canoer who competed in the late 1980s and early 1990s. At the 1988 Summer Olympics in Seoul, he was eliminated in the semifinals of the C-2 500 m event. Four years later in Barcelona, Uchino was eliminated in the semifinals in both the C-2 500 m and the C-2 1000 m events.
