= Japaharinet =

Japanese musical group

- Origin: Ehime Prefecture, Japan
- Genres: Alternative rock, post-punk
- Years active: 1999–2007, 2015-
- Labels: Toy's Factory
- Past members: Kenjiro Kido; Hiroyuki Kashima; Hiroki Nakata; Ryoichi

Japaharinet (ジャパハリネット, Japaharinetto) is a Japanese musical group formed in 1999.

In 2004 they had big hits with "Sadness crossing" (哀愁交差点) and "The days which become far" (遙かなる日々). Their 2004 album Escapism (Genjitsu tōsō-ki 現実逃走記) reached number 10 on the Oricon Albums Chart weekly rankings in Japan.

== Members ==
- Kenjiro Kido (Vocals)
- Hiroyuki Kashima (Bass)
- Hiroki Nakata (Guitar)
- Ryoichi (Drums)

== Discography ==
1. 満ちて来たる日々 (2003)
2. 現実逃走記 (2004)
3. 東京ウォール (2005)
4. 回帰線 (2006)
5. 夢色ロジック (2007)
6. 天国ベスト～BEST FIRE OF HEAVEN～ (2007)
