= Ronald Urick =

American sprint canoer (born 1968)

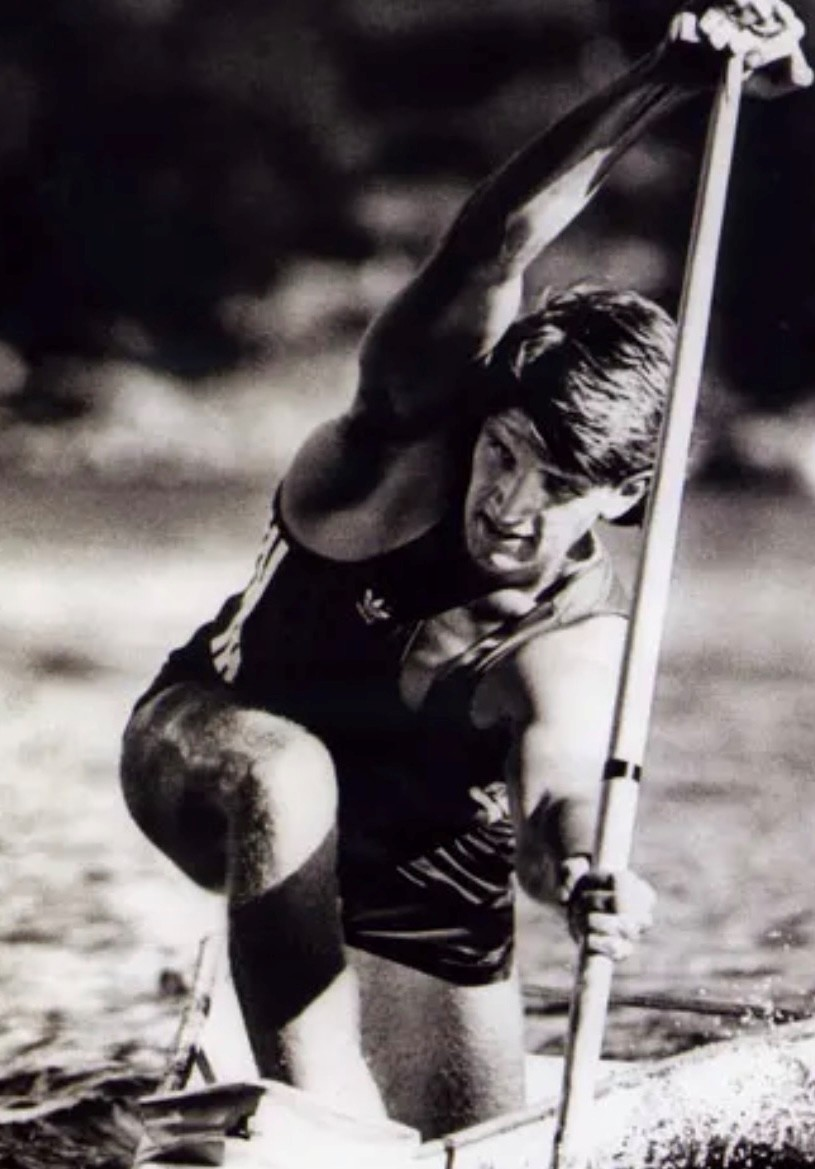
Training Photo 1988

Ronald Urick (born January 7, 1968) is an American sprint canoer who competed in the late 1980s. At the 1988 Summer Olympics in Seoul, Korea he competed in the two-man 1,000-meter event. C-2 1000 m

Post Olympics, Ron Urick, earned a degree from Northern Michigan University while working with Olympic hopefuls (Olympic Training Center at NMU) to complete their Olympic dreams.

As a career, Ron Urick, worked in the petroleum and chemical industries. While raising (4) children in the Midwest. Then later in life, moved to Whitewater, Wisconsin with partner Amy Jacobson and works for Milport Enterprises.

His youngest child, Lyndsey Urick, is an "Elite 8" Division 2 Volleyball Player with a national rank at Ferris State University. The remaining children, Katlyn, Nicholas, and Allison are all graduates from Illinois State University.
