= Juan Aballí =

Cuban canoeist (born 1965)

Personal information
- Full name: Juan Antonio Aballí Delgado
- Born: 10 March 1965 (age 61)
- Height: 172 cm (5 ft 8 in)
- Weight: 82 kg (181 lb)
Medal record
Men's canoe sprint
Representing Cuba
Pan American Games
Gold medal – first place	1987 Indianapolis	C-2 500m
Gold medal – first place	1991 Havana	C-2 500m
Gold medal – first place	1991 Havana	C-2 1000m
Bronze medal – third place	1987 Indianapolis	C-2 1000m
Bronze medal – third place	1995 Mar del Plata	C-2 500m

Juan Antonio Aballí Delgado (Note: In this Spanish name, the first or paternal surname is Aballí and the second or maternal family name is Delgado.) (born 10 March 1965) is a Cuban sprint canoer who competed in the early 1990s. At the 1992 Summer Olympics in Barcelona, he finished ninth in the C-2 1000 m event while being eliminated in the semifinals of the C-2 500 m event.
