= David Frost (canoeist) =

Canadian sprint canoer (born 1965)

Personal information
- Born: April 1, 1965 (age 61) Cap-de-la-Madeleine, Quebec, Canada

Sport
- Sport: Canoe sprint
Medal record
Representing Canada
Summer Universiade
Silver medal – second place	1987 Zagreb	C-2 1000 m

David Frost (born April 1, 1965) is a Canadian sprint canoer who competed in the late 1980s and early 1990s. Competing in two Summer Olympics, he earned his best finish of seventh in the C-2 1000 m event at Barcelona in 1992.
