= Arne Nielsson =

Danish sprint canoer (born 1962)

Medal record

Men's canoe sprint

Olympic Games
Silver medal – second place	1992 Barcelona	C-2 1000 m

World Championships
Gold medal – first place	1987 Duisburg	C-2 10000 m
Gold medal – first place	1989 Plovdiv	C-2 1000 m
Gold medal – first place	1989 Plovdiv	C-2 10000 m
Gold medal – first place	1990 Poznań	C-2 10000 m
Gold medal – first place	1993 Copenhagen	C-2 1000 m
Gold medal – first place	1993 Copenhagen	C-2 10000 m
Silver medal – second place	1993 Copenhagen	C-2 500 m
Bronze medal – third place	1986 Montreal	C-2 10000 m

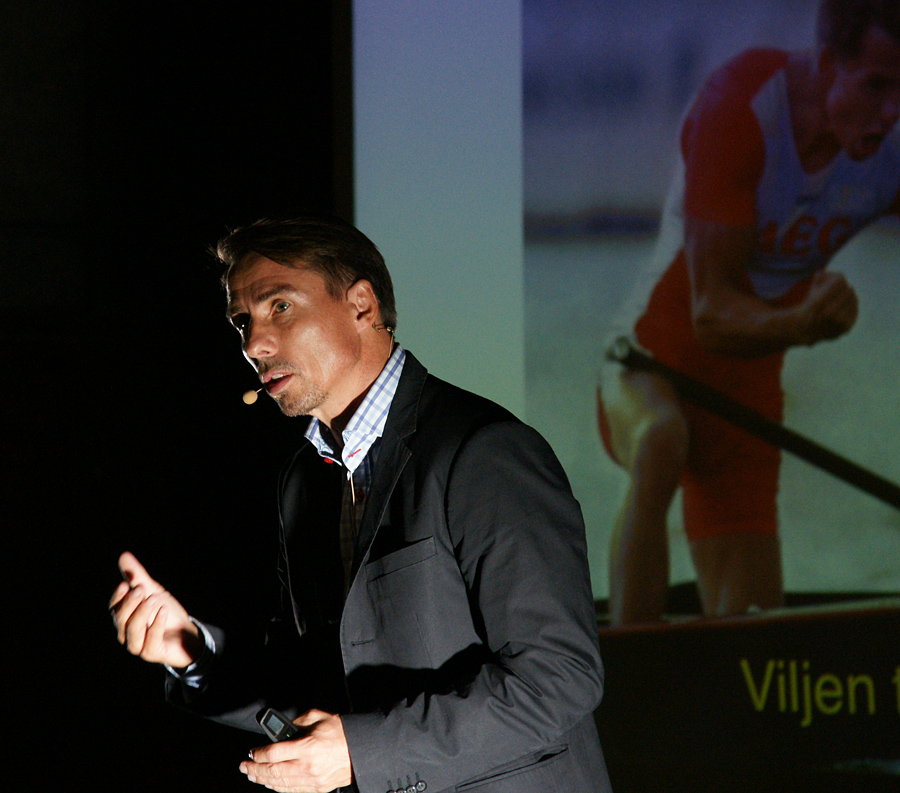
Arne Nielsson.

Arne Nielsson (born 11 May 1962 in Herlev, Denmark) is a Danish sprint canoeist who competed from the late 1980s to the late 1990s. Competing in three Summer Olympics, he won a silver medal in the C-2 1000 m event at Barcelona in 1992.

He started rowing at Furå kano- og kajakklub. In the beginning he wasn't seen as a great talent, due to his lack of size.

Nielsson also won eight medals at the ICF Canoe Sprint World Championships with six golds (C-2 1000 m: 1989, 1993; C-2 10000 m: 1987, 1989, 1990, 1993), one silver (C-2 500 m: 1993), and one bronze (C-2 10000 m: 1986).

Since his retirement from elite sports, Arne Nielsson has worked as a professional coach and he has been writing several books about cognitive coaching and mental training with hint to sportspeople as well as business people.

He is educated as an electrician.
