= List of people from Trenčín =

This is a list of notable people from Trenčín.

- Gábor Baross, statesman
- Milan Bartovič, ice hockey player (HC Slovan Bratislava)
- Tomáš Belic, footballer
- Mário Bližňák, ice hockey player
- Zdeno Chára, ice hockey player (Boston Bruins)
- Matthew Csák (disambiguation), multiple people
- Jakab Cseszneky, medieval magnate
- Oliver von Dohnányi, conductor
- Martin Fabuš, footballer
- Marián Gáborík, ice hockey player (Ottawa Senators)
- Pavol Hamžík, former Foreign Minister of Slovakia
- Marcel Hossa, ice hockey player (HK Dukla Trenčín)
- Marián Hossa, retired ice hockey player
- Elisabeth Klein, pianist
- Joseph Zack Kornfeder, communist
- Matej Krajčík, footballer
- Ľuboš Križko, Olympic swimmer
- Ján Kubica, sprint canoeist
- Radoslav Kunzo, footballer
- Richard Lintner, ice hockey player
- Andrej Meszároš, ice hockey player (HC Slovan Bratislava)
- Juraj Mikúš, ice hockey player
- Andrej Nedorost, ice hockey player
- Peter Ölvecký, ice hockey player
- Anna Pichrtová, mountain runner
- Branko Radivojevič, ice hockey player (HK Dukla Trenčín)
- Ľubomír Sekeráš, ice hockey player
- Kamil Susko, footballer
- Róbert Švehla, ice hockey player
- Ján Svorada, racing cyclist
- Roman Tvrdoň, ice hockey player
- Jaroslav Volek, musicologist and semiotician
- Tomáš Záborský, ice hockey player
- Vojtech Zamarovský, writer
