= Ostrčil =

Ostrčil (Czech/Slovak feminine: Ostrčilová) is a surname. Notable people with the surname include:

- Marián Ostrčil (born 1980), Slovak sprint canoeist
- Mário Ostrčil (born 1978), Slovak sprint canoeist
- Otakar Ostrčil (1879–1935), Czech composer and conductor
- Radim Ostrčil (born 1989), Czech ice hockey player
