= City Tower (Trenčín) =

Historic site in Slovakia

Coordinates: 48°53′39″N 18°02′25″E

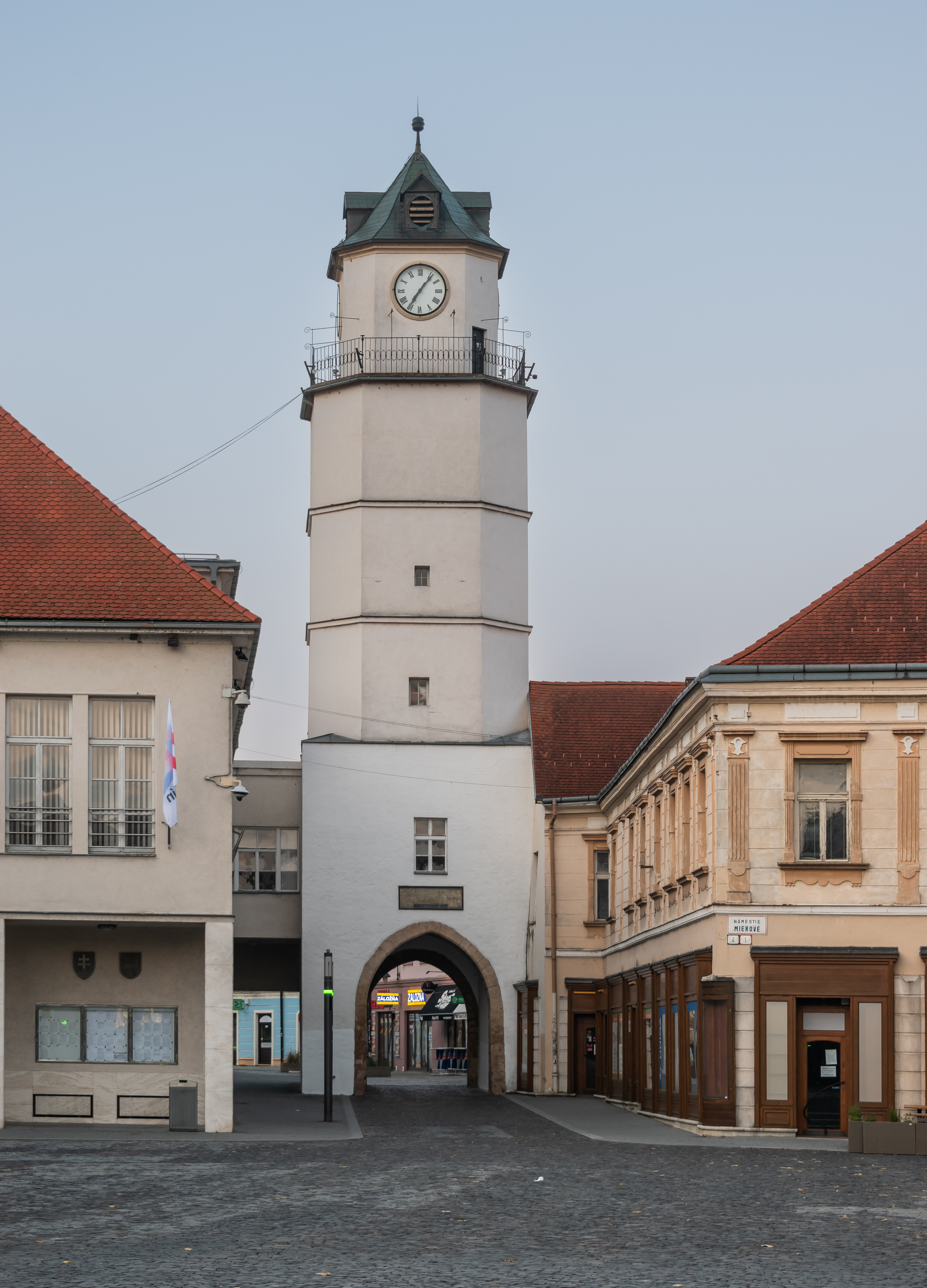
The tower in 2021

The City Tower of Trenčín (Slovak: Trenčianska mestská veža or Dolná brána v Trenčín lit. 'Lower gate') is a tower located in the city centre of Trenčín, Slovakia. It contains 6 floors and is 32 meters tall. It was once a part of the Trenčín Castle.

== History ==
Today’s City Tower, originally called the Lower Gate or Turkish Tower, was part of Trenčín’s medieval fortifications, which included city walls connected to the castle walls. Built in the early 15th century after the city gained the right to construct walls, it was initially a two-story Gothic tower with a square base. The tower was rebuilt in Renaissance style in the early 17th century, adding additional floors and an octagonal top. It was fortified in response to Turkish threats, with a barbican and moat added, although the barbican was later demolished in the 19th century.

The tower housed a Renaissance clock mechanism, replaced by an electric clock in 1934, but the original still exists in a local exhibition. Its name comes from a Turkish attack in 1663, when Turkish troops briefly devastated the city but failed to conquer the castle. This event is symbolized by a biblical inscription above the gate. Over the centuries, the city walls were gradually dismantled, with only the tower and a fragment of the wall behind the parish church remaining today.
