= Canoeing at the 2000 Summer Olympics – Men's C-2 1000 metres =

The Men's C-2 1000 metres event was an open-style, pairs canoeing event conducted as part of the Canoeing at the 2000 Summer Olympics program.

== Medalists ==
Gold	Silver	Bronze
Florin Popescu and Mitică Pricop (ROU)	Ibrahim Rojas and Leobaldo Pereira (CUB)	Stefan Uteß and Lars Kober (GER)

== Results ==
=== Heats ===
14 teams entered in two heats. The top three finishers from each heat advanced directly to the finals while the remaining teams were relegated to the semifinal. Date: Tuesday 26 September 2000

==== Heat 1 ====
Rank	Canoer	Country	Time	Notes
1	Aleksandr Kostoglod and Aleksandr Kovalyov	Russia	3:37.163	QF
2	José Alfredo Bea and David Mascató	Spain	3:37.697	QF
3	Paweł Baraszkiewicz and Michał Gajownik	Poland	3:39.311	QF
4	Andrew Train and Stephen Train	Great Britain	3:39.599	QS
5	Ján Kubica and Mário Ostrčil	Slovakia	3:40.865	QS
6	Attila Buday and Tamás Buday, Jr.	Canada	3:41.075	QS
7	José Ramón Ferrer and José Antonio Romero	Mexico	3:49.301	QS

==== Heat 2 ====
Rank	Canoer	Country	Time	Notes
1	Mitică Pricop and Florin Popescu	Romania	3:37.340	QF
2	Ferenc Novák and Imre Pulai	Hungary	3:38.492	QF
3	Ibrahim Rojas and Leobaldo Pereira	Cuba	3:38.978	QF
4	Stefan Uteß and Lars Kober	Germany	3:39.218	QS
5	Roman Bundz and Leonid Kamlochuk	Ukraine	3:47.150	QS
6	Jan Břečka and Petr Procházka	Czech Republic	3:50.606	QS
7	Konstantin Negodyayev and Zhomart Satubaldin	Kazakhstan	3:53.366	QS

=== Semifinal ===
The top three finishers from the semifinal advanced to the final. Date: Thursday 28 September 2000

Rank	Canoer	Country	Time	Notes
1	Stefan Uteß and Lars Kober	Germany	3:43.032	QF
2	Attila Buday and Tamás Buday, Jr.	Canada	3:44.358	QF
3	José Ramón Ferrer and José Antonio Romero	Mexico	3:44.358	QF
4	Andrew Train and Stephen Train	Great Britain	3:45.624	
5	Ján Kubica and Mário Ostrčil	Slovakia	3:45.636	
6	Roman Bundz and Leonid Kamlochuk	Ukraine	3:47.298	
7	Konstantin Negodyayev and Zhomart Satubaldin	Kazakhstan	3:48.756	
8	Jan Břečka and Petr Procházka	Czech Republic	3:51.012	

=== Final ===
Date: Saturday 30 September 2000

Rank	Canoer	Country	Time	Notes
1	Mitică Pricop and Florin Popescu	Romania	3:37.355	
2	Ibrahim Rojas and Leobaldo Pereira	Cuba	3:38.753	
3	Stefan Uteß and Lars Kober	Germany	3:41.129	
4	Aleksandr Kostoglod and Aleksandr Kovalyov	Russia	3:41.267	
5	Ferenc Novák and Imre Pulai	Hungary	3:43.103	
6	José Ramón Ferrer and José Antonio Romero	Mexico	3:46.457	
7	Attila Buday and Tamás Buday, Jr.	Canada	3:48.017	
8	Paweł Baraszkiewicz and Michał Gajownik	Poland	3:52.229	
9	José Alfredo Bea and David Mascató	Spain	3:54.053	
