= Tamas Buday Jr. =

Canadian canoeist

Medal record

Men's canoe sprint

World Championships
Silver medal – second place	2002 Seville	C-4 1000 m
Silver medal – second place	2003 Gainesville	C-4 1000 m
Silver medal – second place	2006 Szeged	C-2 1000 m

Tamás Buday Jr. (born April 23, 1976) is a Hungarian-born Canadian sprint canoer who competed from 1996 to 2006. He won three silver medals at the ICF Canoe Sprint World Championships (C-2 1000 m: 2006, C-4 1000 m: 2002, 2003). Buday was born in Budapest, Hungary.

Competing in three Summer Olympics alongside his brother Attila, Buday earned his best finish of seventh in the C-2 1000 m event at Sydney in 2000.

Buday's father Tamás won bronze medals for Hungary in the C-2 500 m and C-2 1000 m events at the 1976 Summer Olympics in Montreal.
