= Ramón Ferrer =

Mexican canoeist (born 1968)

Personal information
- Born: September 23, 1968 (age 57) Mexico City, Mexico

Sport
- Sport: Canoeing
Medal record
Representing Mexico
World Championships
| Bronze medal – third place | 1994 Mexico City | C-4 1000 m |
Pan American Games
| Silver medal – second place | 1991 Havana | C-2 1000m |
| Silver medal – second place | 1995 Mar del Plata | C-2 500m |
| Bronze medal – third place | 1991 Havana | C-1 500m |
| Bronze medal – third place | 1995 Mar del Plata | C-2 1000m |
Central American and Caribbean Games
| Gold medal – first place | 1990 Mexico City | C-2 1000m |
| Gold medal – first place | 1993 Ponce | C-2 1000m |
| Silver medal – second place | 1990 Mexico City | C-1 500m |
| Silver medal – second place | 1993 Ponce | C-2 200m |
| Silver medal – second place | 1993 Ponce | C-2 500m |

José Ramón Ferrer Cruz (born September 23, 1968) is a Mexican sprint canoer. He competed from the early 1990s to the early 2000s. Ferrer competed in two Summer Olympics, earning his best finish of sixth in the C-2 1000 m event at the 2000 Sydney Olympics.

== Career ==
Ferrer won a bronze medal in the C-4 1000 m event at the 1994 ICF Canoe Sprint World Championships in Mexico City.

Ferrer reached the highest finish of any Mexican canoeist in the 2000 Summer Olympics along with Antonio Romero finishing in 6th place and establishing himself as an icon of Mexican canoeing.
