= Silvestre Pereira =

Portuguese canoeist

Silvestre Pereira (born 24 August 1971) is a Portuguese sprint canoer who competed in the mid-1990s. At the 1996 Summer Olympics in Atlanta, he was eliminated in the semifinals of both the C-1 500 m and the C-1 1000 m events.
