= Lars Kober =

German canoeist

Olympic medal record

Men's canoe sprint
| Bronze medal – third place | 2000 Sydney | C-2 1000 m |

Lars Kober (born 19 October 1976 in Berlin) is a German sprint canoer who competed in the late 1990s and early 2000s. He won a bronze medal in the C-2 1000 m event at the 2000 Summer Olympics in Sydney with Stefan Uteß.
