= Stefan Uteß =

German sprint canoer (born 1974)

Olympic medal record

Men's canoe sprint
Bronze medal – third place	2000 Sydney	C-2 1000 m

Stefan Uteß (born 31 October 1974 in Demmin, East Germany) is a German sprint canoer who competed in the late 1990s and early 2000s. He won a bronze medal in the C-2 1000 m event at the 2000 Summer Olympics in Sydney with Lars Kober.
