= Vadim Salcuțan =

Moldovan canoeist

Vadim Salcuțan (born July 21, 1973) is a Moldovan sprint canoer who competed in the mid-1990s. He was eliminated in the semifinals of the C-1 1000 m event at the 1996 Summer Olympics in Atlanta.
