= Canoeing at the 1996 Summer Olympics – Men's C-1 1000 metres =

Men's C-1 1000 metres at the Games of the XXVI Olympiad
- Venue: Lake Lanier
- Dates: 30 July 1996 (heats); 1 August 1996 (semifinals); 3 August 1996 (final)
- Competitors: 18 from 18 nations
- Winning time: 3:54.418

Medalists
1st place, gold medalist(s)		Martin Doktor	Czech Republic
2nd place, silver medalist(s)		Ivans Klementjevs	Latvia
3rd place, bronze medalist(s)		György Zala	Hungary

The men's C-1 1000 metres event was an open-style, individual canoeing event conducted as part of the Canoeing at the 1996 Summer Olympics program.

== Medallists ==
Gold	Silver	Bronze
Martin Doktor (CZE)	Ivans Klementyev (LAT)	György Zala (HUN)

== Results ==
=== Heats ===
18 competitors were entered. The top two finishers in each heat moved on to the final with the others relegated to the semifinals.

==== Heat 1 ====
Rank	Canoer	Country	Time	Notes
1.	Martin Doktor	Czech Republic	4:19.918	QF
2.	Patrick Schulze	Germany	4:21.114	QF
3.	Ivans Klementyev	Latvia	4:24.678	QS
4.	Victor Partnoi	Romania	4:25.678	QS
5.	Arne Nielsson	Denmark	4:30.258	QS
6.	Pascal Sylvoz	France	4:33.618	QS
7.	Ján Kubica	Slovakia	4:33.810	QS
8.	Konstantin Negodyayev	Kazakhstan	4:40.842	QS
9.	Nikolay Bukhalov	Bulgaria	4:43.562	QS

==== Heat 2 ====
Rank	Canoer	Country	Time	Notes
1.	György Zala	Hungary	4:23.399	QF
2.	Roman Bundz	Ukraine	4:26.555	QF
3.	Ivan Šabjan	Croatia	4:28.375	QS
4.	Vadim Salcutan	Moldova	4:32.095	QS
5.	José Manuel Crespo	Spain	4:34.071	QS
6.	Gavin Maxwell	Canada	4:36.971	QS
7.	Yevgeny Astanin	Uzbekistan	4:39.839	QS
8.	Silvestre Pereira	Portugal	4:42.715	QS
9.	Joseph Harper	United States	4:45.467	QS

=== Semifinals ===
The top two finishers in each semifinal and the fastest third-place finisher advanced to the final.

==== Semifinal 1 ====
Rank	Canoer	Country	Time	Notes
1.	Ivan Šabjan	Croatia	4:13.901	QF
2.	Victor Partnoi	Romania	4:14.333	QF
3.	Arne Nielsson	Denmark	4:14.573	
4.	Ján Kubica	Slovakia	4:22.773	
5.	Konstantin Negodyayev	Kazakhstan	4:26.251	
6.	Gavin Maxwell	Canada	4:27.721	
7.	Joseph Harper	United States	4:39.949	

==== Semifinal 2 ====
Rank	Canoer	Country	Time	Notes
1.	Ivans Klementyev	Latvia	4:10.455	QF
2.	Pascal Sylvoz	France	4:11.483	QF
3.	Nikolay Bukhalov	Bulgaria	4:14.415	QF
4.	José Manuel Crespo	Spain	4:15.939	
5.	Vadim Salcutan	Moldova	4:16.639	
6.	Yevgeny Astanin	Uzbekistan	4:19.151	
7.	Silvestre Pereira	Portugal	4:31.199	

=== Final ===
The final took place on August 3.

Rank	Canoer	Country	Time	Notes
1st place, gold medalist(s)	Martin Doktor	Czech Republic	3:54.418	
2nd place, silver medalist(s)	Ivans Klementyev	Latvia	3:54.954	
3rd place, bronze medalist(s)	György Zala	Hungary	3:56.366	
4.	Patrick Schulze	Germany	3:57.778	
5.	Pascal Sylvoz	France	3:59.014	
6.	Victor Partnoi	Romania	3:59.858	
7.	Roman Bundz	Ukraine	4:02.078	
8.	Ivan Šabjan	Croatia	4:04.066	
9.	Nikolay Bukhalov	Bulgaria	4:13.034	

Doktor led from start to finish.
