= Leonid Kamlochuk =

Ukrainian canoeist (born 1974)

Leonid Kamlochuk (Ukrainian: Камлочук Леонід Васильович; born July 4, 1974) is a Ukrainian sprint canoer who competed in the early 2000s. He was eliminated in the semifinals of the C-2 1000 m event at the 2000 Summer Olympics in Sydney.
