= Yevgeny Astanin =

Uzbek sprint canoer (born 1974)

Personal information
- Born: November 11, 1974 (age 51)
- Height: 186 cm (6 ft 1 in)
- Weight: 80 kg (176 lb)
Medal record
Men's canoe sprint
Representing Uzbekistan
Asian Games
| Gold medal – first place | 1994 Hiroshima | C-1 1000 m |
| Bronze medal – third place | 1994 Hiroshima | C-1 500 m |

Yevgeny Astanin (Евгений Астанин, born November 11, 1974) is an Uzbek sprint canoer who competed in the mid-1990s. At the 1996 Summer Olympics in Atlanta, he was eliminated in the semifinals of both the C-1 500 m and the C-1 1000 m events.
