= Patrick Schulze =

German sprint canoer (born 1973)

Medal record

Men's canoe sprint

World Championships
Bronze medal – third place	1995 Duisburg	C-4 1000 m
Bronze medal – third place	1999 Milan	C-2 1000 m

Patrick Schulze (born 2 January 1973) is a German sprint canoer who competed in the late 1990s. He won two bronze medals at the ICF Canoe Sprint World Championships, earning them in the C-2 1000 m (1999) and C-4 1000 m (1995) events.

Schulze also finished fourth in the C-1 1000 m event at the 1996 Summer Olympics in Atlanta.
