= Joseph Harper (canoeist) =

American canoeist (born 1966)

Joseph Harper (born January 13, 1966) is an American sprint canoer who competed in the mid-1990s. He was eliminated in the semifinals of the C-1 1000 m event at the 1996 Summer Olympics in Atlanta. Joseph Harper 2024 Olympic Canoe Sprint Coach of Nevin Harrison who won silver at the Olympic Games in Paris in record breaking time. Coaching with innovative coaching techniques. A dynamic coaching style, pushing athletes beyond their limits with extraordinary results.
