= Trenčín Synagogue =

Former synagogue in Trenčín, Slovakia

- Slovak: Synagóga v Trenčíne
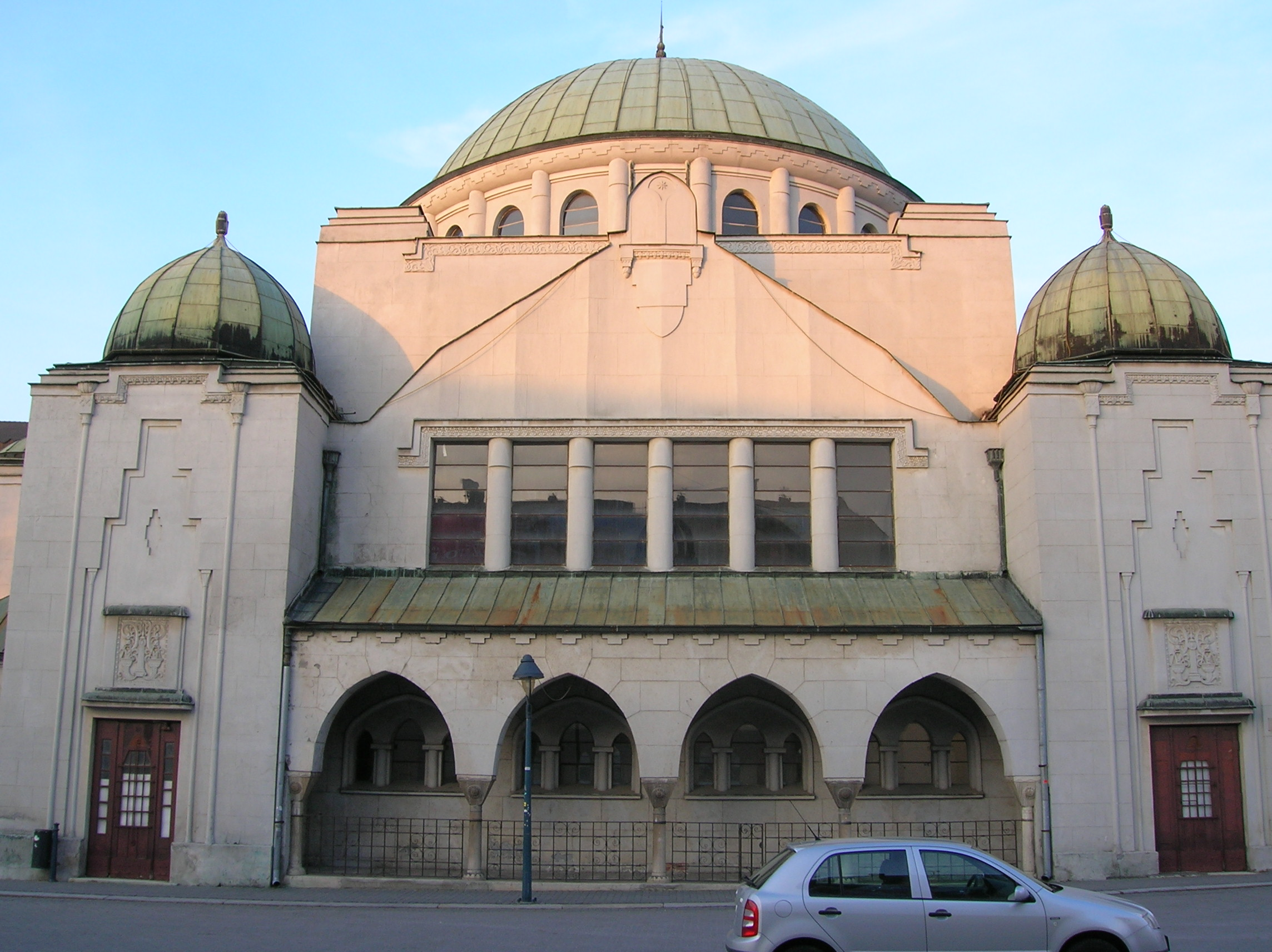
- Façade of the former synagogue building

- Location of the former synagogue in Slovakia

Religion
- Affiliation: Neolog Judaism (former)
- Ecclesiastical or organizational status: Deconsecrated
- Status: Cultural centre

Location
- Location: Trenčín
- Country: Slovakia
- Interactive map of Trenčín Synagogue
- Coordinates: 48°53′40″N 18°02′23″E

Architecture
- Architect: Richard Scheibner
- Style: Neo-Byzantine; Traditionalist
- Completed: 1913
- Dome: 3

The Trenčín Synagogue (Slovak: Synagóga v Trenčíne) is a cultural centre and former Neolog Jewish congregation and synagogue in the city of Trenčín in Slovakia. The building is recognised as a Cultural Heritage Monument of Slovakia.

== History ==
The Jewish population of the city was around 2000 members. The synagogue was inaugurated in September 1913, the Jewish community built the building on the site of a previous wooden synagogue from 1781. The synagogue building was built according to the plans of Richard Scheibner, who was born on March 19, 1880 in Piešťany, lived and worked in Berlin and died on October 13, 1945 in Berlin-Charlottenburg.

In 1941, it was damaged by the Slovak Hlinka Guard. After the war, the building became property of the state and was used as a storage facility. Jews from the city prayed in a room nearby. It was renovated at the end of the 1970's and is now a cultural centre.

== Gallery ==
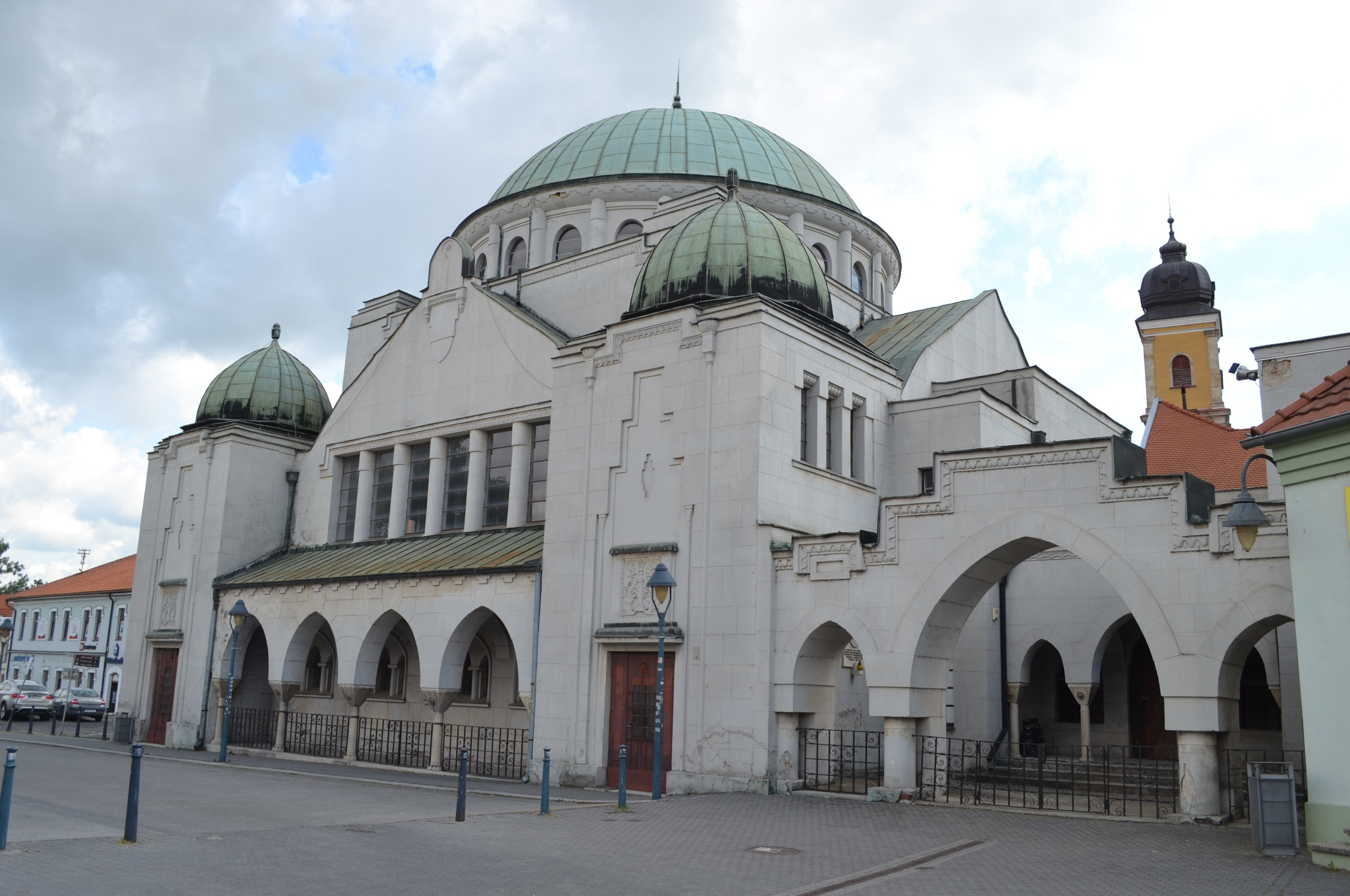

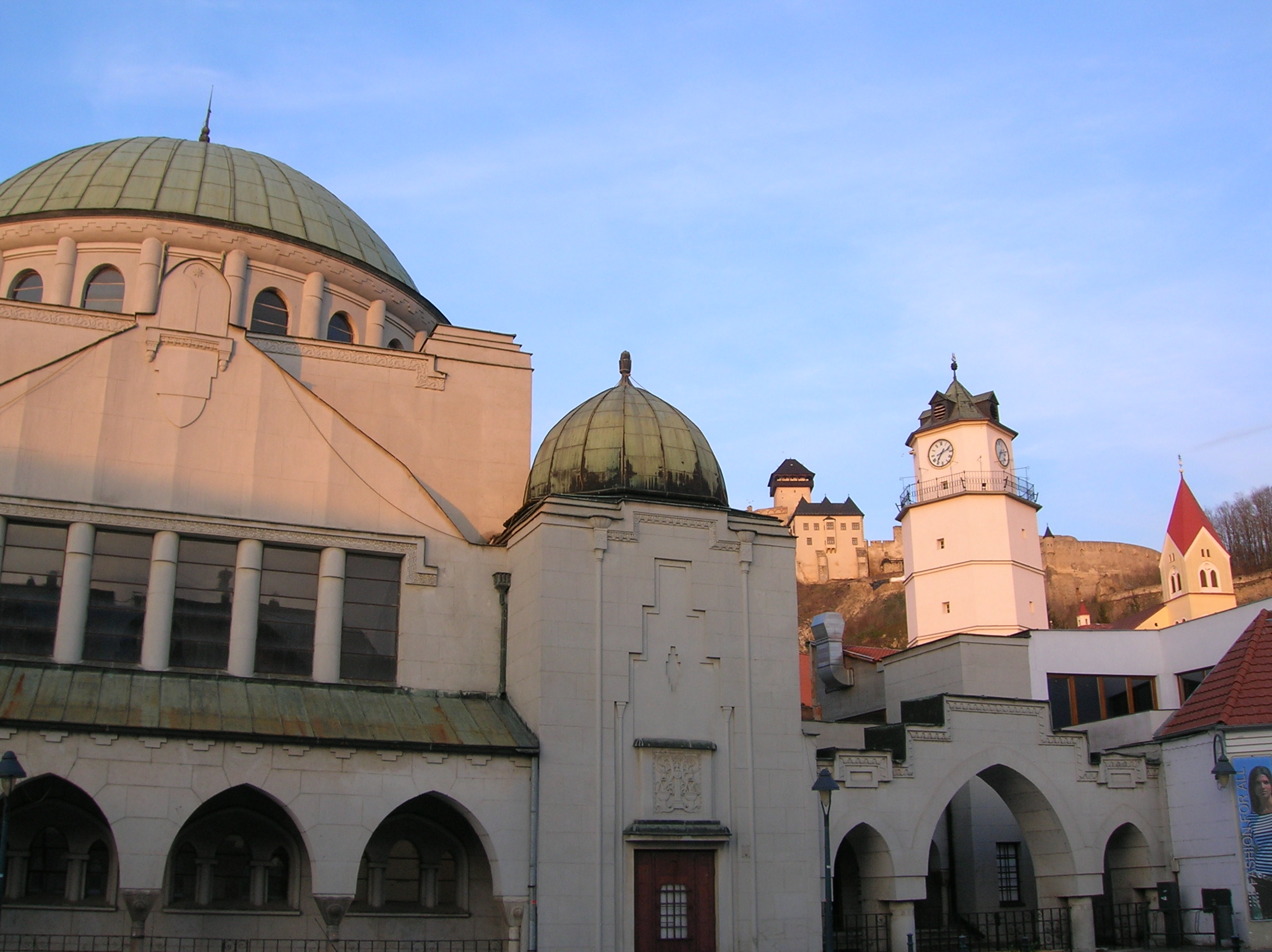

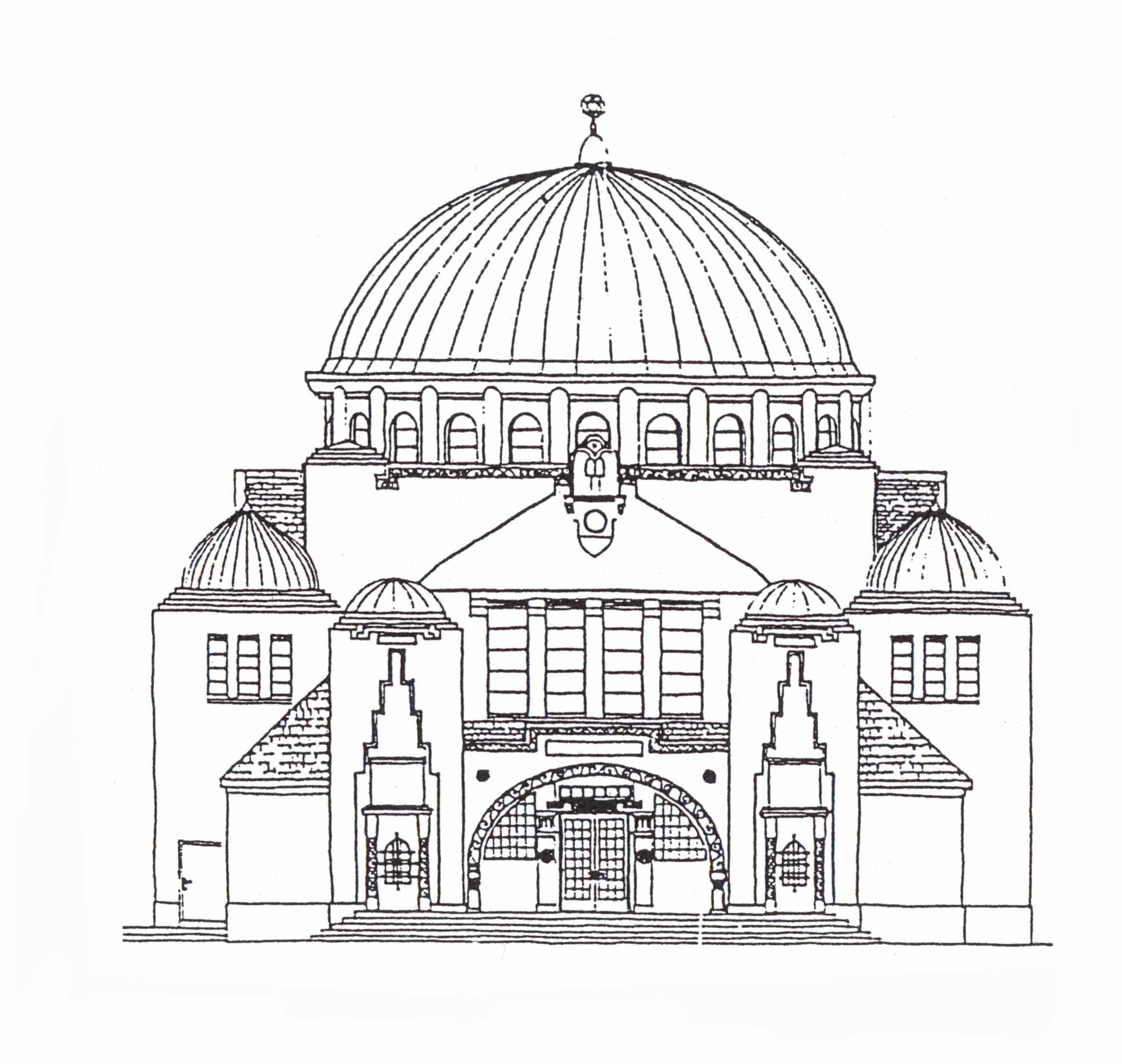

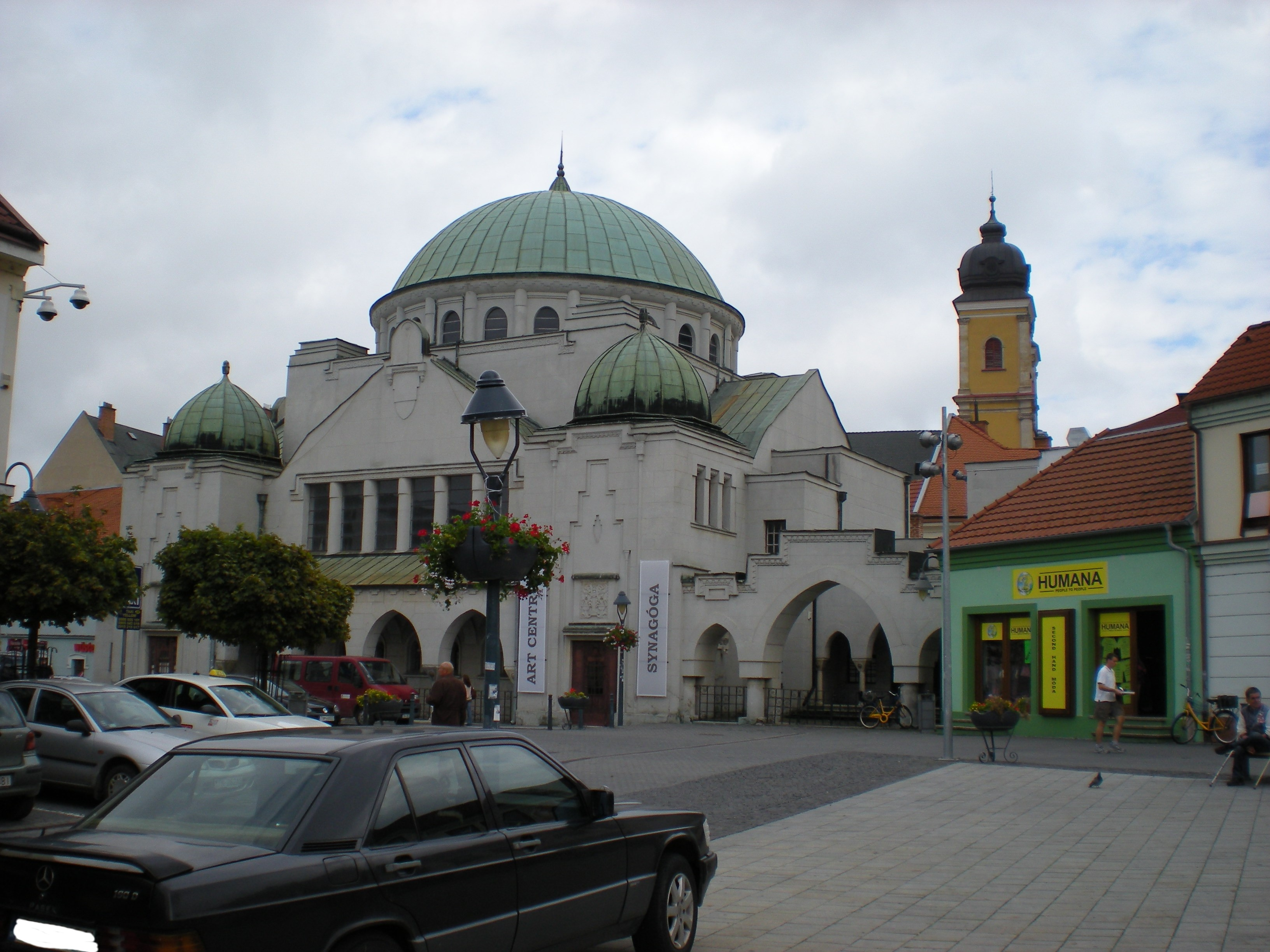

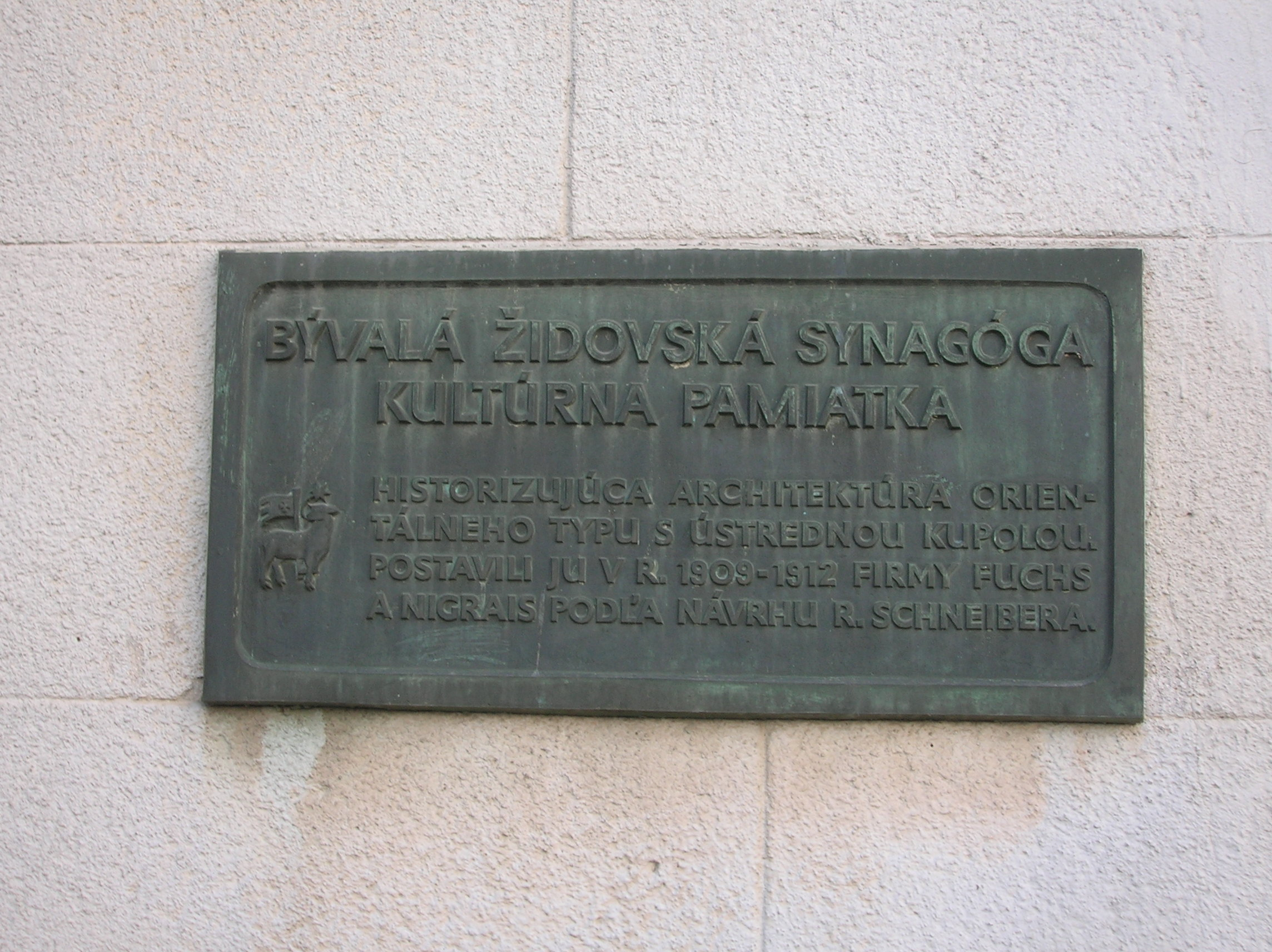

== See also ==
- History of the Jews in Slovakia
