= Ján Kubica =

Slovak canoeist

Ján Kubica (born June 17, 1973, in Trenčín) is a Slovak sprint canoer who competed from the mid-1990s to the early 2000s (decade). At the 1996 Summer Olympics in Atlanta, he was eliminated in the semifinals of the C-1 1000 m event. four years later in Sydney, Kubica was eliminated in the semifinals of both the C-2 500 m and the C-2 1000 m events.
