= György Zala (canoeist) =

Hungarian canoeist

Medal record

Men's canoe sprint

Olympic Games
Bronze medal – third place	1992 Barcelona	C-1 1000 m
Bronze medal – third place	1996 Atlanta	C-1 1000 m

World Championships
Gold medal – first place	2001 Poznań	C-4 200 m
Gold medal – first place	2001 Poznań	C-4 1000 m
Silver medal – second place	1989 Plovdiv	C-4 500 m
Silver medal – second place	1990 Poznań	C-1 1000 m
Silver medal – second place	1995 Dusiburg	C-4 1000 m
Silver medal – second place	2001 Poznań	C-4 500 m
Bronze medal – third place	1990 Poznań	C-2 500 m
Bronze medal – third place	1998 Szeged	C-2 1000 m

György Zala (born January 19, 1969, in Budapest) is a Hungarian sprint canoeist who competed from 1989 to 2001.

Competing in three Summer Olympics, he won two bronze medals in the C-1 1000 m event, earning them in 1992 and 1996.

Zala, a hyperactive child, took up canoeing at the age of 11. A great natural athlete despite suffering from asthma, it seemed he was only truly motivated by the Olympics. Between Olympiads he tended to fall out of sight, focussing instead on his other passions such as extreme sports.

It was not until later in his career that he won any world or European championship titles. He took to his new role as the "old man" of the Hungarian four-man crew with enthusiasm, helping his younger teammates to victory in the C-4 1000 m event at the 2000 European Championships in Poznań. The following year he returned to Poznań, this time for the world championships and, despite injury, won two golds (C-4 200 m and C-4 1000 m). Zala also won six additional world championship medals with four silvers (C-1 1000 m: 1990, C-4 500 m: 1989, 2001; C-4 1000 m: 1995) and two bronzes (C-2 500 m: 1990, C-2 1000 m: 1998).

He is 173 cm (5'8) tall and raced at 84 kg (185 lbs).
