= Ivans Klementjevs =

Soviet-born Latvian politician and former sprint canoeist

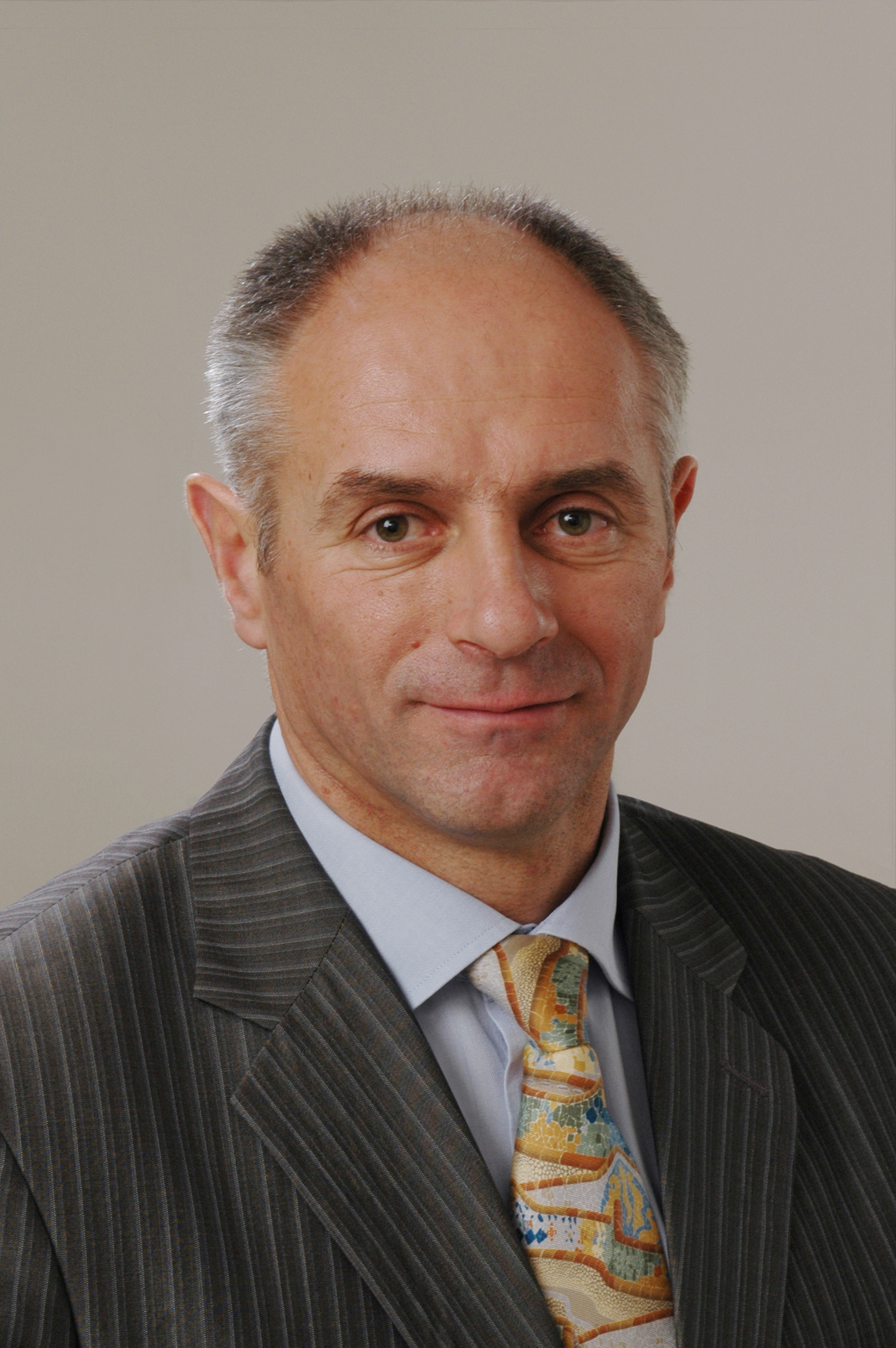
- Klementjevs in 2010

Medal record

Men's canoe sprint

Representing Soviet Union

Olympic Games
Gold medal – first place	1988 Seoul	C-1 1000 m

World Championships
Gold medal – first place	1985 Mechelen	C-1 1000 m
Gold medal – first place	1989 Plovdiv	C-1 1000 m
Gold medal – first place	1989 Plovdiv	C-1 10000 m
Gold medal – first place	1990 Poznań	C-1 1000 m
Gold medal – first place	1991 Paris	C-1 1000 m
Silver medal – second place	1983 Tampere	C-2 500 m
Silver medal – second place	1986 Montreal	C-1 1000 m
Silver medal – second place	1991 Paris	C-1 10000 m
Bronze medal – third place	1987 Duisburg	C-1 1000 m
Bronze medal – third place	1990 Poznań	C-1 10000 m

Representing Latvia

Olympic Games
Silver medal – second place	1992 Barcelona	C-1 1000 m
Silver medal – second place	1996 Atlanta	C-1 1000 m

World Championships
Gold medal – first place	1993 Copenhagen	C-1 1000 m
Bronze medal – third place	1995 Duisburg	C-1 1000 m

Representing Poland

World Championships
Gold medal – first place	1994 Mexico City	C-1 1000 m

Ivans Klementjevs (born 18 November 1960 in Burtiki) is a Latvian politician and former sprint canoeist who competed from the mid-1980s to the late 1990s. He won three Olympic medals in C-1 1000 m at the 1988, 1992 and 1996 Summer Olympics. The highlight was the gold medal in 1988, which he won as a competitor for the USSR. He trained at Trudovye Rezervy and later at the Armed Forces sports society in Riga when Latvia was part of the Soviet Union.

He also won a total of twelve C-1 medals at the ICF Canoe Sprint World Championships with seven golds (C-1 1000 m: 1985, 1989, 1990, 1991, 1993, 1994; C-1 10000 m: 1989), two silvers (C-1 1000 m: 1986, C-1 10000 m: 1991), and three bronzes (C-1 1000 m: 1987, 1995; C-1 10000 m: 1990). Klementjev's only non C-1 world championship medal was a silver in the C-2 500 m event in 1983.

After retiring from canoeing, Klementijevs entered politics and was a Riga city councillor for the National Harmony Party from 2001 to 2005, and since 2006 is a member of the Saeima for Harmony.

He was awarded with the highest Latvian state decoration - the Order of the Three Stars, 4th Class in 1999.
