= Trenčín =

City in Slovakia

- City
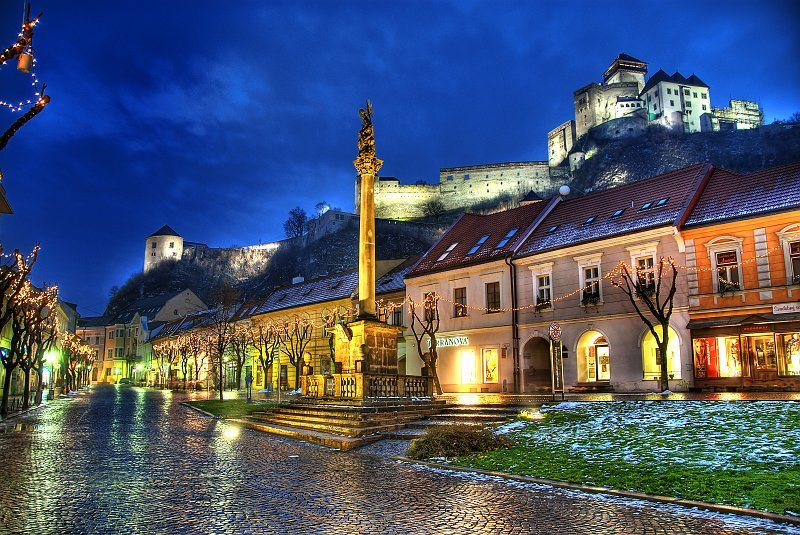
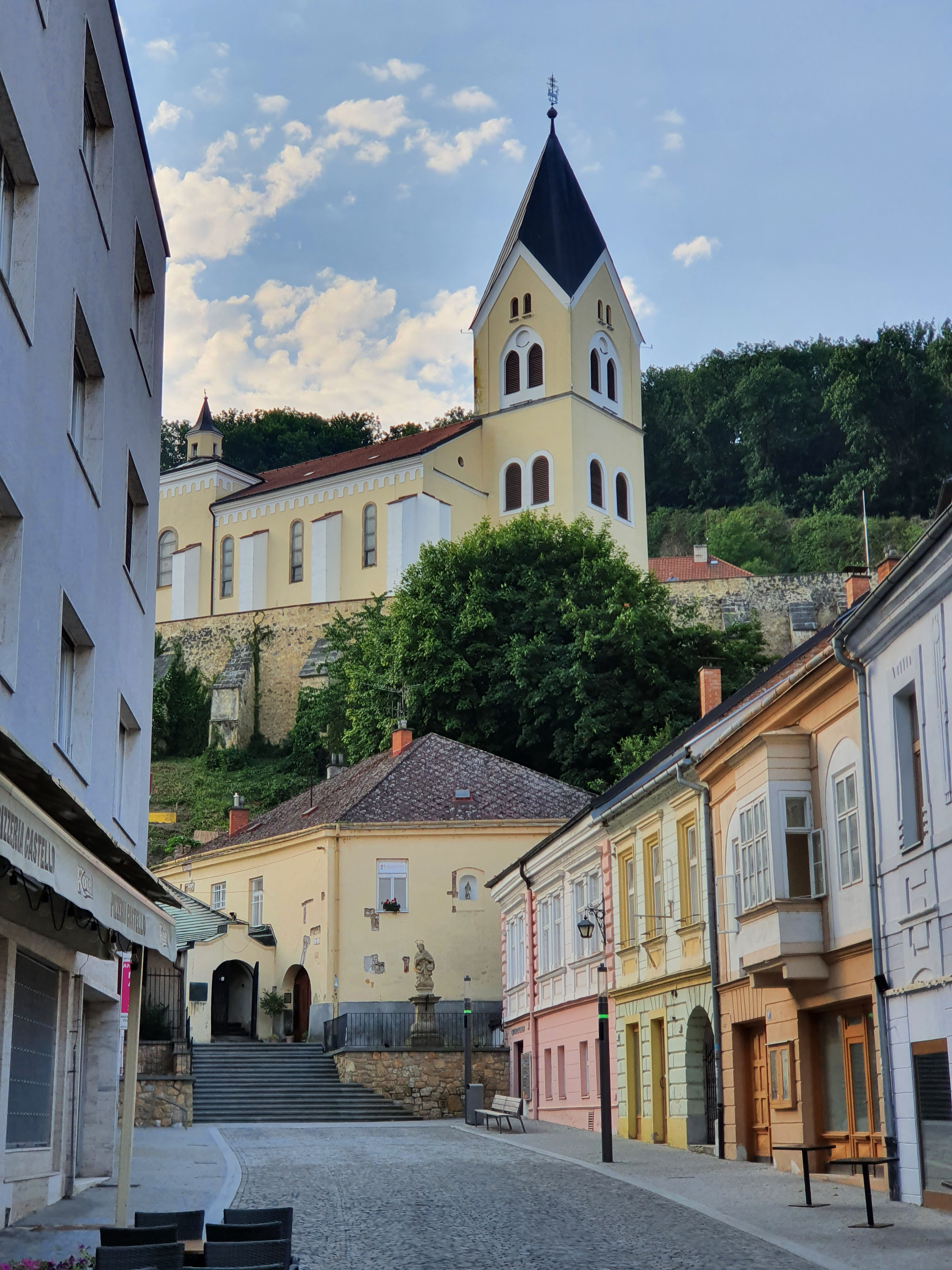
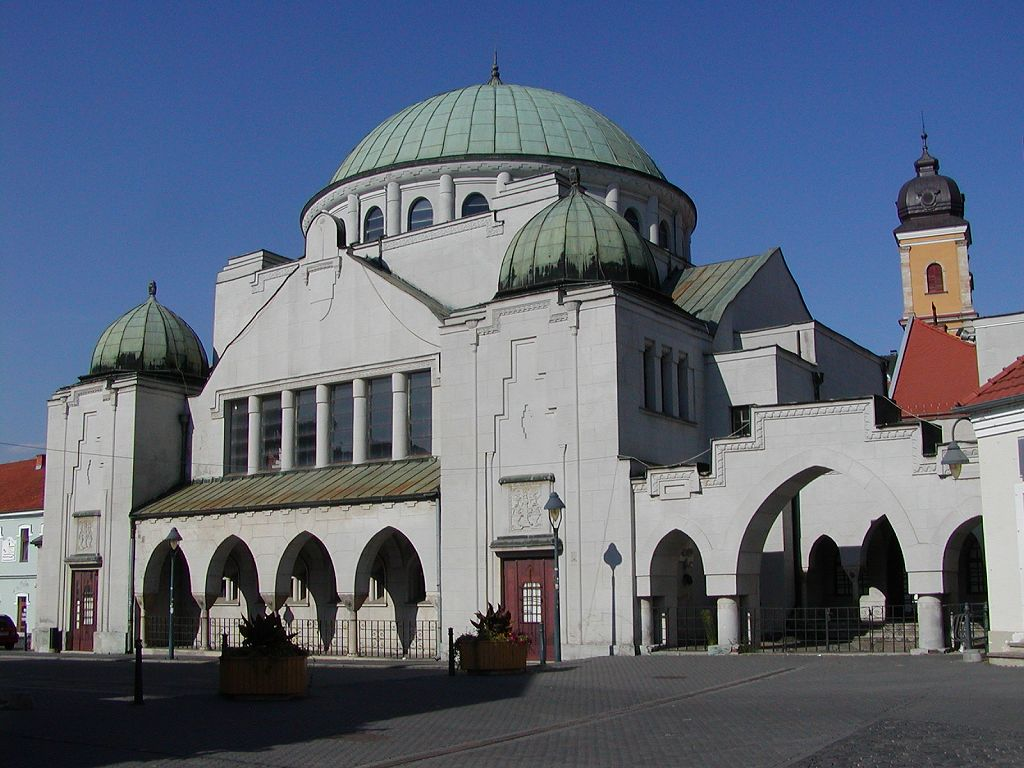
- From the top, Central Trenčín and Trenčín Castle, Kostol Narodenia Panny Márie, Trenčín Synagogue

- Flag Coat of arms

- Location of Slovakia Trenčín (Slovakia)
- Coordinates: 48°53′31″N 18°02′12″E
- Country: Slovakia
- Region: Trenčín Region
- District: Trenčín District
- First mentioned: circa 150

Government
  - Mayor: Ján Forgáč (Independent)

Area
  - Total: 81.99 km^{2} (31.66 sq mi)
- (2022)
- Elevation: 217 m (712 ft)

Population (2025)
  - Total: 54,104
- Time zone: UTC+1 (CET)
  - Summer (DST): UTC+2 (CEST)
- Postal code: 911 01
- Area code: +421 32
- Vehicle registration plate (until 2022): TN, TC, TE
- Website: trencin.sk

Trenčín (Slovak pronunciation: [ˈtrentʂiːn], also known by other alternative names) is a city in western Slovakia of the central Váh River valley near the Czech border, around 95 km (59 mi) from Bratislava. It has a population of more than 55,000, which makes it the eighth largest municipality of the country and is the seat of the Trenčín Region and the Trenčín District. It has a medieval castle, Trenčín Castle, on a rock above the city.

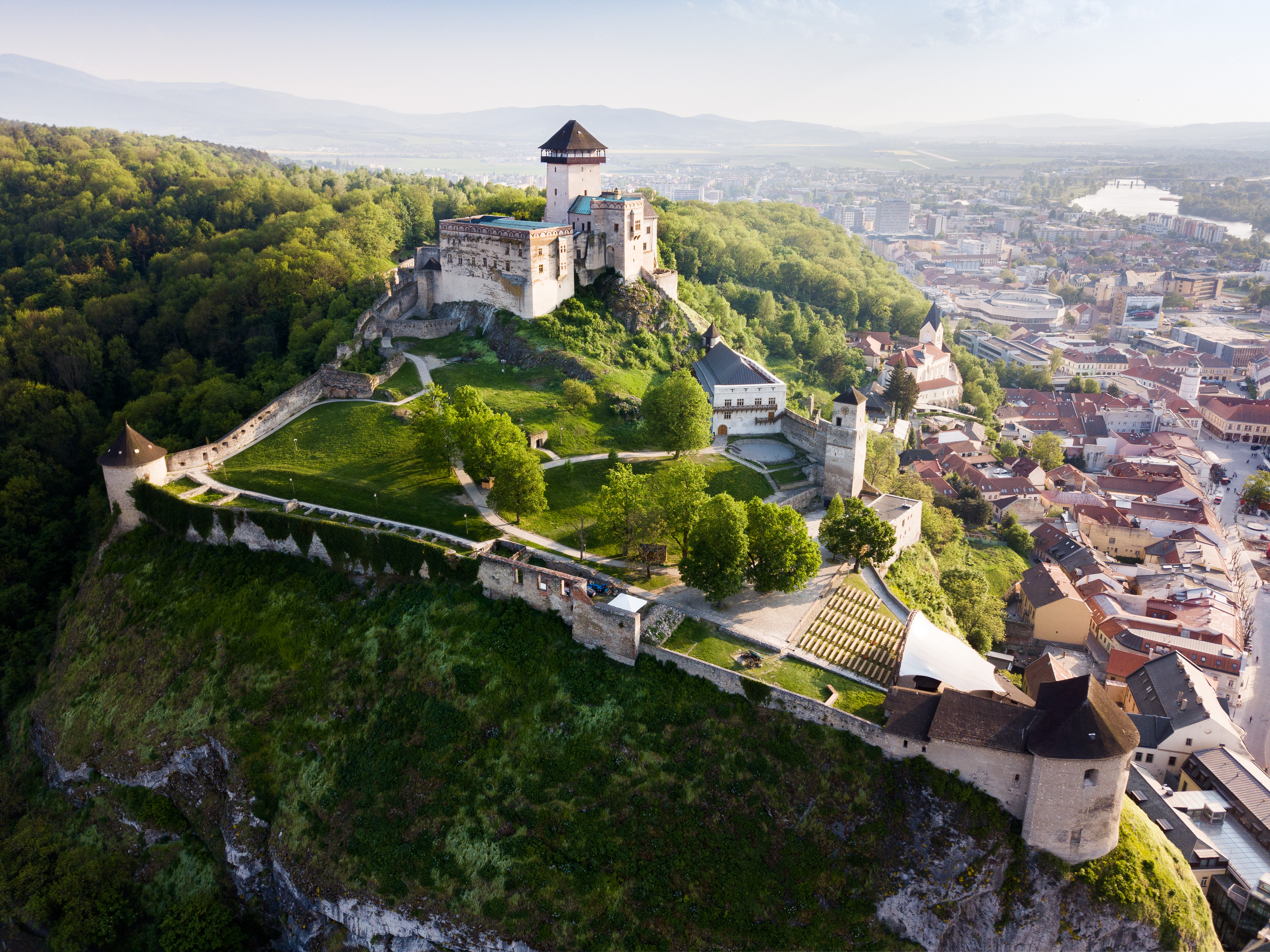
Trenčín Castle

Trenčín has been selected as the European Capital of Culture in 2026 together with Oulu, Finland.

== Names and etymology ==
Trenčín was first mentioned under the Greek name Leukaristos (Λευκάριστος), depicted on the Ptolemy world map around 150 AD. During the course of the Marcomannic Wars between the Roman Empire and Germanic Quadi, the Romans carved an inscription on the rock under the present-day castle in 179 AD, and the place was mentioned as Laugaricio. For a long time, it was considered the northernmost known presence of the Romans in Central Europe.

The first written mentions in the Middle Ages are from 1111 (as Treinchen) and 1113 (adjective Trenciniensis). The name is probably derived from a personal name Trnka/Trenka (Slovak/Slavic - Blackthorn) with a possessive suffix -ín. The German, Hungarian, and Polish forms are Trentschin, Trencsén, and Trenczyn, respectively.

== History ==
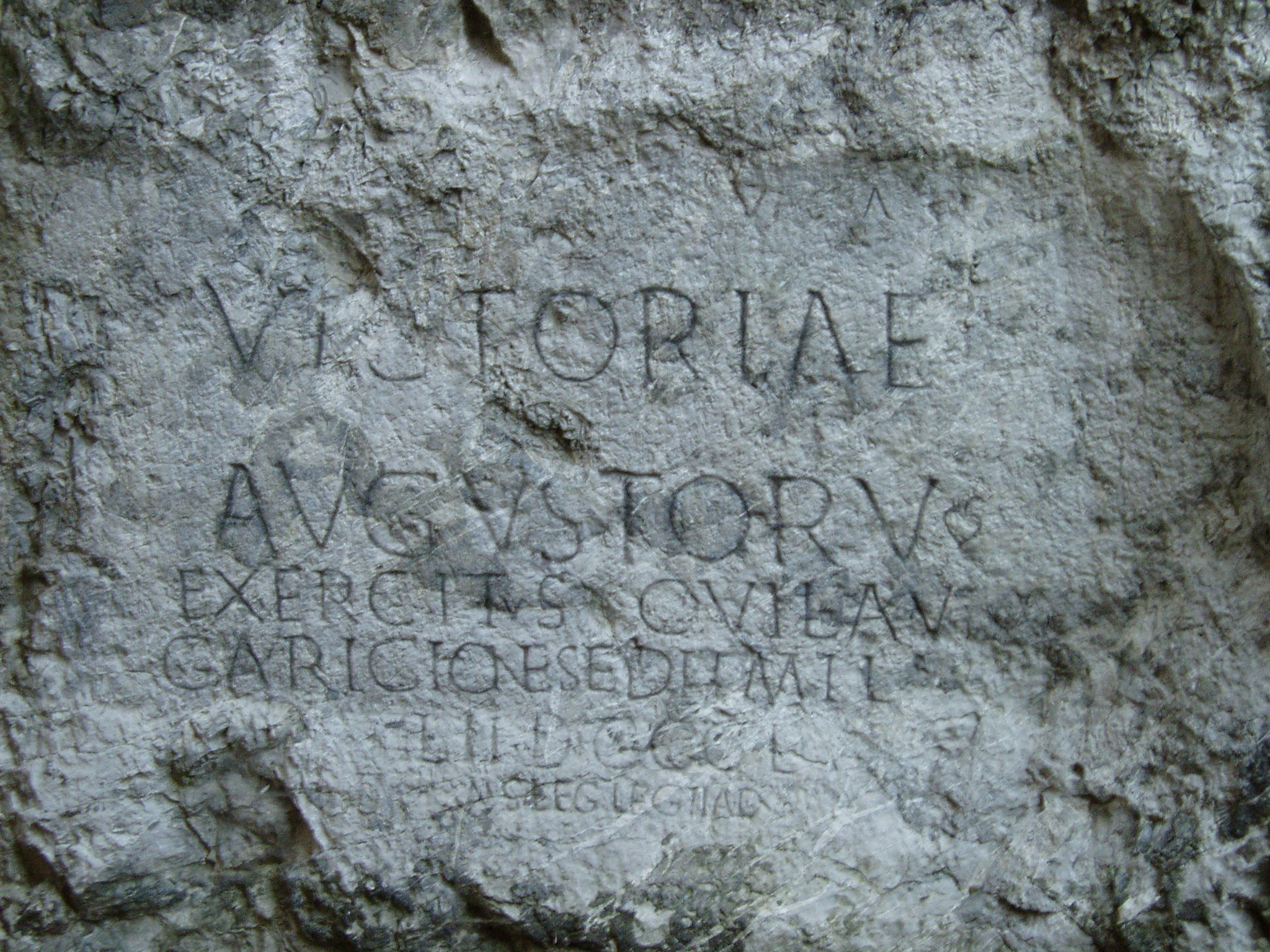
Below Trenčín Castle is this Roman inscription: Victoriae Augustorum exercitus, qui Laugaricione sedit, mil(ites) l(egiones) II DCCCLV. (Maximi)anus leg(atus leg)ionis II Ad(iutricis) cur(avit) f(aciendum) (Done by 855 Legionaries of the Augustus victorious army, who are stationed in Laugaricio. Done under the supervision of Maximus legatus of II legion.)

The site of Trenčín has been inhabited since time immemorial. Trenčín Castle, a typical medieval fortified castle is situated high on a rock above the city. Trenčín is best known for a Roman inscription on the rock below the Trenčín Castle dating from 179 AD, the era of the Marcomannic Wars, a series of wars between the Roman Empire and the Germanic Quadi and Marcomanni. It denotes the site as Laugaricio and for long time it was the most northern known evidence of the presence of Roman soldiers in central Europe (until the Roman fort by Mušov and marching camps by Olomouc and Hulín were found).

Trenčín is one of the suggested locations for the capital of Samo's Empire in the 7th century. Wogastisburg (Vogast castle) was probably located somewhere on the Vogas river and was also the site of a decisive battle between the Slavic and Frankish armies in 631.

It is plausible that Trenčín Castle was founded during the Great Moravian era. At the beginning of the 11th century, the region was controlled by King Bolesław I the Brave of Poland. In 1017, Stephen I of Hungary conquered the region, which remained part of Hungary until 1918. By the end of the 11th century, the castle became the administrative centre of Trencsén county in the Kingdom. As one of the few stone castles in the country, it resisted the disastrous invasion of Mongols in 1241. In 1263, Trenčín was in the possession of the royal Swordbearer Jakab Cseszneky, but in 1302, King Wenceslas I took it away from the Cseszneky brothers because they were supporting his rival Charles Robert, and donated it to Matthew Csák. Between 1302 and 1321, the castle was the seat of the powerful magnate Matthew Csák, who controlled most of present-day Slovakia. Challenging the authority of King Charles Robert, Csák maintained a large court and pursued his own foreign policy. The Treaty of Trentschin between Bohemia, Hungary, and Poland was signed in the city in 1335.

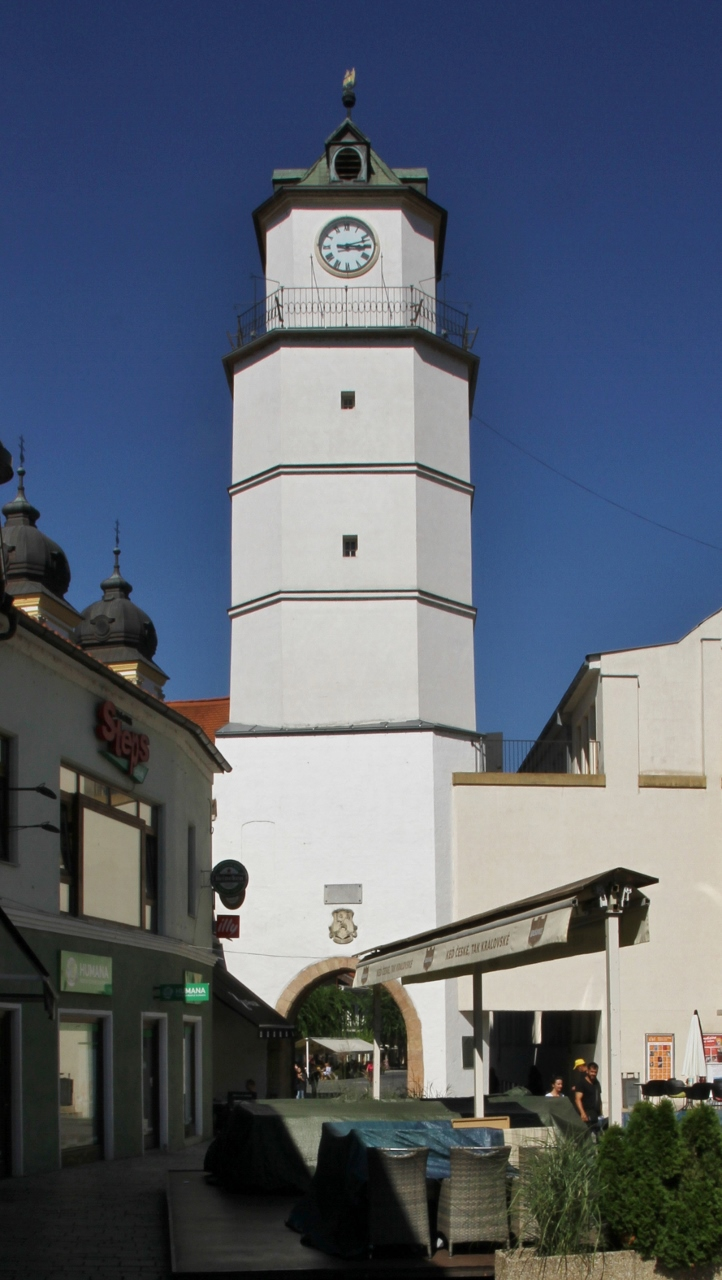
City Tower known as Dolná brána ("Lower Gate") in Sládkovičova ulica

Trenčín gained several privileges during the Middle Ages: in 1324, the inhabitants were freed from paying tolls, and the city received free royal town privileges in 1412 from King Sigismund. However, during the following decades and centuries, catastrophes and wars began which lasted until the end of the 18th century. In 1528, during the conflict between the Habsburgs and the supporters of the rival king, János Szapolyai, the town was captured by imperial troops. In the 17th century, the Ottomans were another threat from the south, but they failed to conquer the city. The town then suffered from the Kuruc uprising against the Habsburgs, and on 3 August 1708, the Battle of Trenčín took place close to the city. Two years later, a plague killed 1,600 inhabitants of the city. Finally, in 1790, the town, along with the castle, was burned down, and the castle has been in ruins ever since.

In the 19th century, Trenčín flourished as the railways to Žilina and Bratislava were built and many new enterprises were established, particularly in the textile, food, and machine industries.

The town became the hub of the middle Považie region.

In 1867, Trenčín was downgraded from a "free royal town" to a "town with municipal government" and brought under the direct control of the chief of Trenčín county.

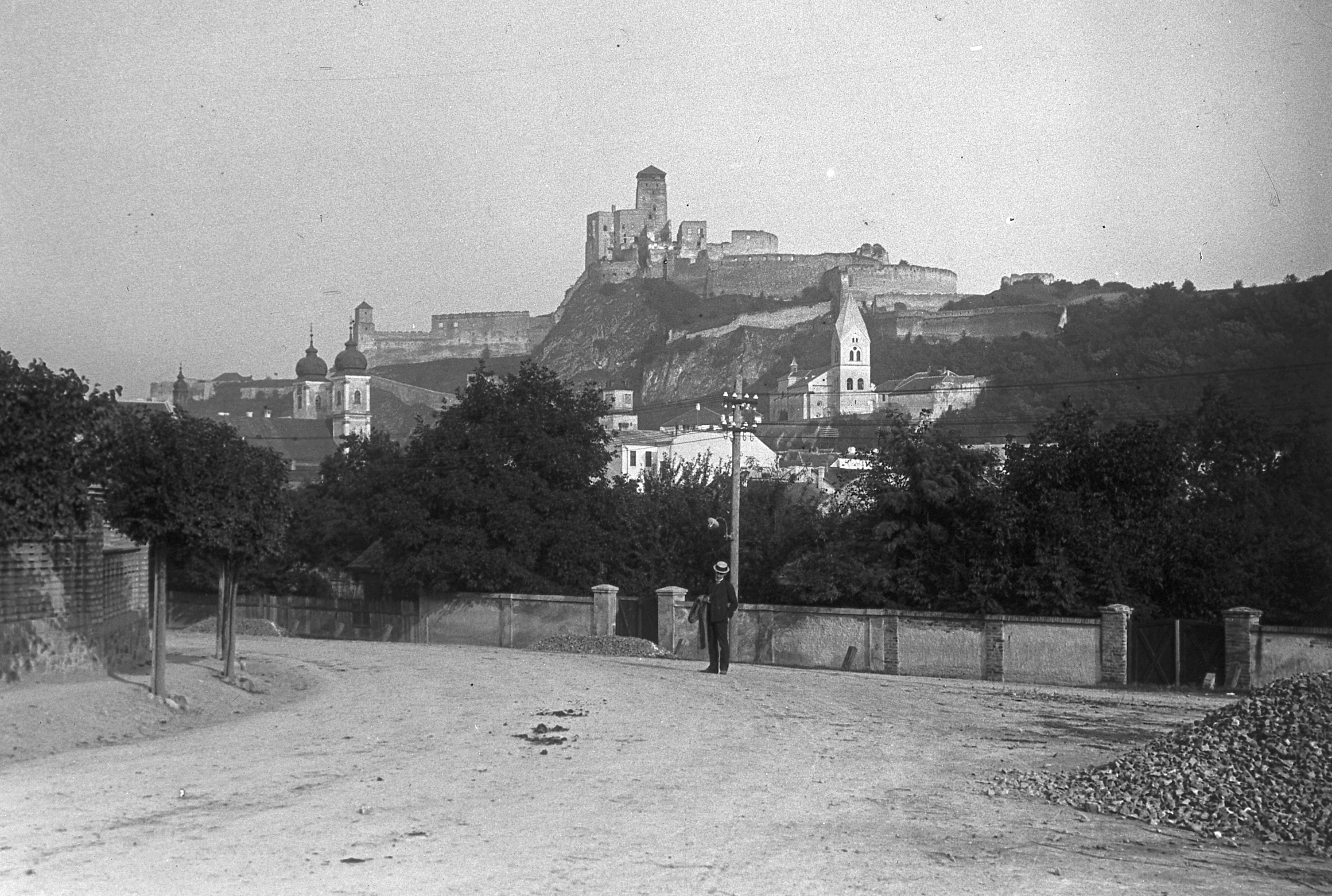
Trenčín in 1908

Trenčín flourished again during the era of the first Czechoslovak republic and became the capital of the Trenčín county again between 1940 and 1945 when the Slovak Republic was in existence.

Shortly after the Slovak National Uprising began, Trenčín was occupied by Nazi Germany, and it became the headquarters of the Sicherheitsdienst and the Gestapo.

Trenčín was captured by Romanian and Soviet troops on 10 April 1945.

Since 1990, the historical centre of the city has been largely restored, and since 1996 it has been the seat of Trenčín Region and Trenčín District. The castle and its Roman inscription have attracted tourism since.

== Geography ==
The municipality lies at an altitude of 217 metres (712 ft) and covers an area of 81.99 km^{2} (31.66 sq mi) (2025). It lies in the Trenčín Basin of north-western Slovakia, which is surrounded by the Strážov Mountains, Považský Inovec and White Carpathians, with the last mentioned being a protected area. The Váh River flows in the north–south axis.

=== Climate ===
Trenčín lies in the north temperate zone and has a continental climate (Dfb) with four distinct seasons. It is characterized by a significant variation between hot summers and cold, snowy winters.

Climate data for Trenčín (1991–2020 normals)
Month	Jan	Feb	Mar	Apr	May	Jun	Jul	Aug	Sep	Oct	Nov	Dec	Year
Daily mean °C (°F)	−1.1 (30.0)	0.8 (33.4)	4.5 (40.1)	10.1 (50.2)	14.8 (58.6)	18.6 (65.5)	20.2 (68.4)	19.6 (67.3)	14.8 (58.6)	9.7 (49.5)	5.2 (41.4)	−0.5 (31.1)	9.7 (49.5)
Average precipitation mm (inches)	41.4 (1.63)	43 (1.7)	42.9 (1.69)	40.6 (1.60)	67.7 (2.67)	74.6 (2.94)	78.4 (3.09)	62.5 (2.46)	64.1 (2.52)	51.7 (2.04)	46.6 (1.83)	42.7 (1.68)	656.2 (25.83)
Source: Slovak hydrometeorological institute

== Tourism and sights ==
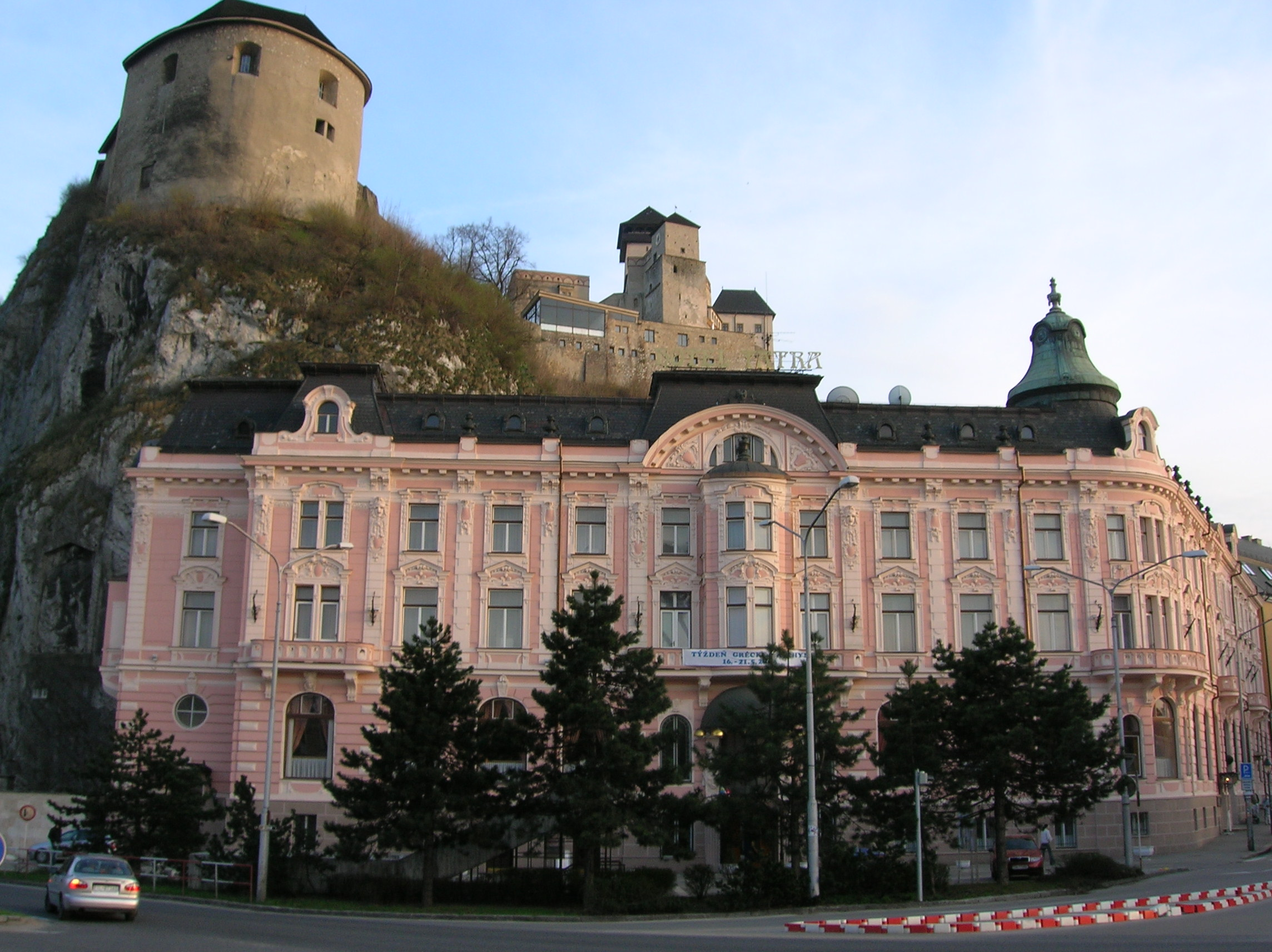
Hotel Tatra (now Elizabeth) below Trenčín Castle

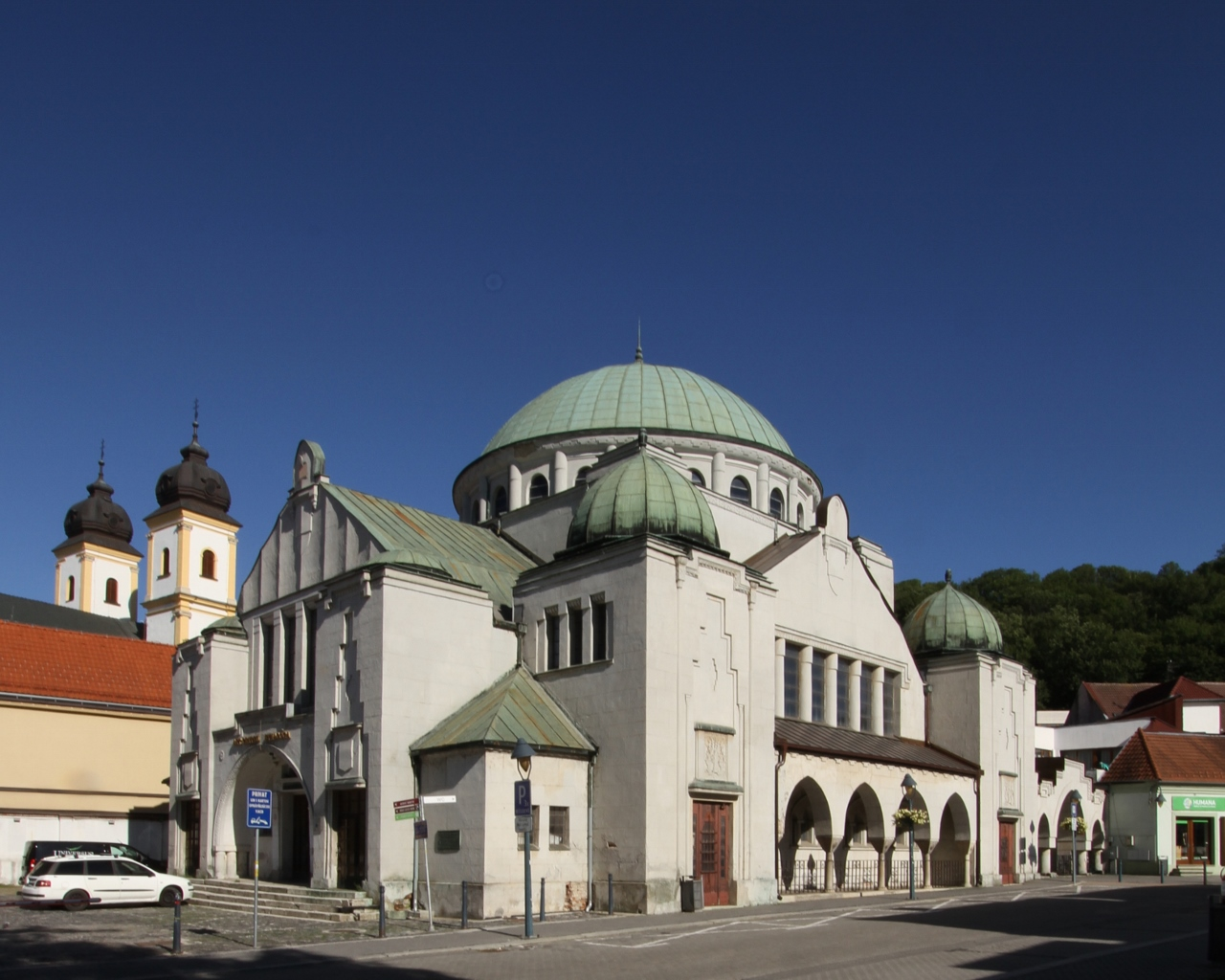
Trenčín Synagogue in Štúrovo námestie

The city is dominated by Trenčín Castle, which is the third-largest castle in Slovakia. Trenčín Castle is divided into upper and lower sections, with extensive fortifications. The upper castle has several palace buildings which surround the central medieval tower, which remains the highest point of the city. Below the castle, on the hillside, is the old parish church and a small upper square which is reached by historic covered stairs as well as by winding side streets. The old town has a large main square, with a large baroque church and various shops, as well as a town tower.

The Trenčín Synagogue, built in 1913, and restored in 2024, is now a cultural center with exhibitions and concerts.

As of 2026 the Trenčín Museum, formerly the Natural Scientific Alliance of Trenčín County, is closed for renovation.

Pohoda, the most visited music festival in Slovakia, has been organized in Trenčín since 1997. As of 2004, it takes place at the Trenčín Airport.

== Population ==
Historical population
Year	Pop.	±%
1970	39,127	—
1980	49,972	+27.7%
1991	56,828	+13.7%
2001	57,854	+1.8%
2011	55,877	−3.4%
2021	54,740	−2.0%
Source: Censuses

Population statistic (10 years)
Year	1995	2005	2015	2025
Count	58,872	56,750	55,698	54,104
Difference		−3.60%	−1.85%	−2.86%

Population statistic
Year	2024	2025
Count	54,130	54,104
Difference		−0.04%

It has a population of 54,104 people (31 December 2025).

=== Ethnicity ===
Census 2021 (1+%)
Ethnicity	Number	Fraction
Slovak	50,782	92.76%
Not found out	3080	5.62%
Czech	1059	1.93%
Total	54,740	

In year 2021 was 54,740 people by ethnicity 50,782 as Slovak, 3080 as Not found out, 1059 as Czech, 221 as Other, 137 as Hungarian, 91 as Russian, 72 as Rusyn, 67 as Ukrainian, 67 as Moravian, 65 as German, 45 as Romani, 40 as Polish, 38 as Italian, 17 as Jewish, 17 as Irish, 17 as English, 16 as Serbian, 16 as French, 13 as Croatian, 12 as Vietnamese, 11 as Austrian, 11 as Canadian, 11 as Bulgarian, 8 as Romanian, 7 as Greek, 5 as Silesian, 4 as Chinese, 4 as Albanian, 2 as Turkish, 2 as Korean and 2 as Iranian.

Note on population: The difference values of population numbers in the table "Population statistic" and in the sections "Ethnicity" & "Religion" is caused by the use of various statistical methods.

=== Religion ===
Census 2021 (1+%)
Religion	Number	Fraction
Roman Catholic Church	27,008	49.34%
None	19,454	35.54%
Not found out	3714	6.78%
Evangelical Church	2672	4.88%
Total	54,740	

In year 2021 was 54,740 people by religion 27,008 from Roman Catholic Church, 19,454 from None, 3714 from Not found out, 2672 from Evangelical Church, 409 from Greek Catholic Church, 268 from Ad hoc movements, 200 from Other, 161 from Christian Congregations in Slovakia, 133 from Buddhism, 131 from Eastern Orthodox Church, 112 from Other and not ascertained christian church, 67 from Seventh-day Adventist Church, 65 from Islam, 55 from Jehovah's Witnesses, 52 from Apostolic Church, 48 from Paganism and natural spirituality, 45 from Calvinist Church, 43 from Church of the Brethren, 26 from Jewish community, 19 from United Methodist Church, 14 from Old Catholic Church, 13 from Czechoslovak Hussite Church, 11 from Bahá'i Community, 10 from Hinduism, 5 from Church of Jesus Christ of Latter-day Saints, 4 from Baptists Church and 1 from New Apostolic Church.

== Sport ==
Handball of the 1984 Friendship Games was hosted at Hala na Sihoti.

Association football club AS Trenčín currently plays in the top-tier Slovak Super Liga after winning promotion following the 2011–12 season as second-tier Slovak First League champions, while the ice hockey club Dukla Trenčín currently plays in the Slovak Extraliga, having won the Extraliga championship four times.

Trenčín is the hometown of several professional ice hockey players, including Ottawa Senators forward Marián Gáborík, New York Islanders defenceman Zdeno Chára, and Chicago Blackhawks forward Marián Hossa, all playing in the National Hockey League (NHL) in North America. Additionally, long-time Liverpool centre back Martin Škrtel hails from Trenčín.

The festival for non-Olympic sports will be held in town in 2017.

== Education ==
Trenčín is home to the public Alexander Dubček University with 7,140 students, including 110 doctoral students, and the private College of Management in Trenčín with 1,275 students. The city's system of primary education consists of nine public schools and one religious primary school, enrolling 4,623 pupils overall. Secondary education is represented by five gymnasia with 1,974 students, 5 specialized high schools with 1,892 students, and 6 vocational schools with 3,975 students.

== Transport ==
Trenčín lies near the main Slovak motorway and is an important stop on the main railway line from Bratislava to Žilina and Košice. Roads from the city also lead into the Czech Republic to Brno and other parts of Slovakia; Prievidza/Nitra. Railway tracks from the aforementioned cities end in Trenčín. Trenčín also has an airport. But the closest international airport is in Bratislava.

== Territorial division ==
Trenčín is divided into four main boroughs:

- Stred (center): Staré mesto (old town), Dolné mesto (lower town), Dlhé Hony, Noviny, Biskupice
- Juh (south): Juh I-III
- Sever (north): Sihoť I-IV, Opatová nad Váhom, Pod Sokolice, Kubrá, Kubrica
- Západ (west): Zámostie, Kvetná, Istebník, Orechové, Zlatovce, Nové Zlatovce, Záblatie

== Notable people ==
- Zdeno Chára (born 1977), NHLer
- Marian Hossa, NHLer
- Marián Gáborík (born 1982), NHLer
- Monika Chochlikova (born 1996), kickboxer and Muay Thai fighter
- Marián Chovanec (born 1957), Roman Catholic bishop
- Ignaz Grossmann (1825–1897), rabbi
- Jozef Ján Matejka (born 1949), writer and doctor
- Eva Kristínová (1928–2020), actress
- Romana Schlesinger (born 1986), LGBT rights activist
- Ján Zachara (1928–2025), boxer

== Twin towns – sister cities ==
Trenčín is twinned with:

- Cran-Gevrier, France
- Zlín, Czech Republic
- Tarnów, Poland
- Casalecchio di Reno, Italy
- Békéscsaba, Hungary
- Kragujevac, Serbia

== See also ==
- List of people from Trenčín
- Marcus Valerius Maximianus
