= Attila Buday =

Canadian sprint canoer

Personal information
- Born: June 28, 1974 (age 51) Budapest, Hungary
Medal record
Men's canoe sprint
Representing Canada
World Championships
Silver medal – second place	2002 Seville	C-4 1000 m
Silver medal – second place	2003 Gainesville	C-4 1000 m
Silver medal – second place	2006 Szeged	C-2 1000 m
Pan American Games
Silver medal – second place	1995 Mar del Plata	C-1 500m
Silver medal – second place	1995 Mar del Plata	C-2 1000m
Silver medal – second place	1999 Winnipeg	C-2 1000m

Attila Buday (born June 28, 1974) is a Hungarian-born Canadian sprint canoer who competed from 1996 to 2006. He won three silver medals at the ICF Canoe Sprint World Championships (C-2 1000 m: 2006, C-4 1000 m: 2002, 2003)

Competing in three Summer Olympics, Buday earned his best finish of seventh in the C-2 1000 m event at Sydney in 2000.

Buday's father Tamás won bronze medals in the C-2 500 m and C-2 1000 m events at the 1976 Summer Olympics in Montreal.

Buday resides in Mississauga with his wife Carrie Lightbound.
