= Trenčín Castle =

Castle in Trenčin, Slovakia

- Trenčín, Slovakia
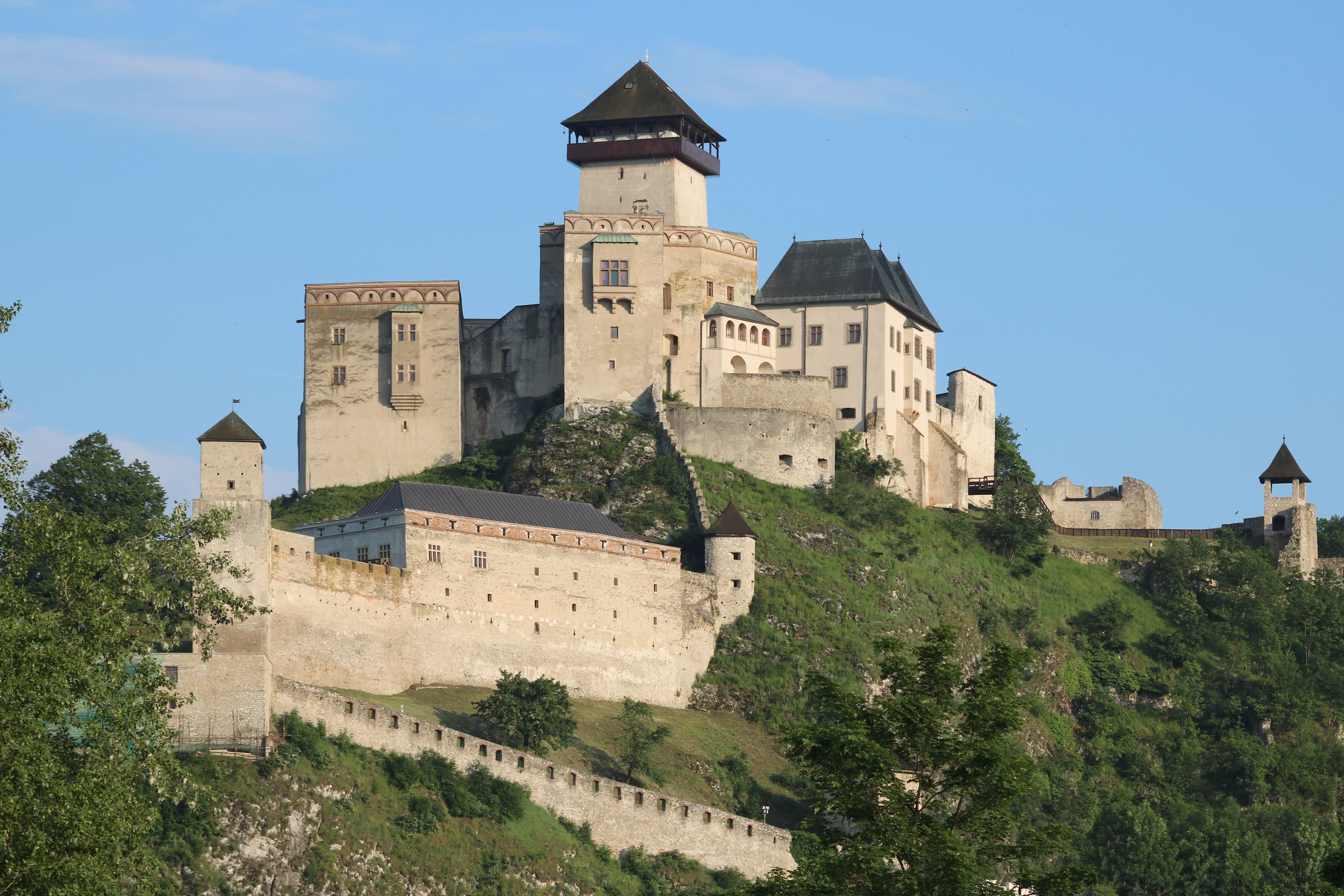
- Trenčín castle

Location
- Location in Slovakia
- Location within Slovakia
- Coordinates: 48.894167°N 18.044722°E

The Trenčín Castle (Slovak: Trenčiansky hrad, Hungarian: trencsényi vár, German: Burg Trentschin) is a castle above the town of Trenčín in western Slovakia.

== History ==
The history of the castle goes back to the age of the Roman Empire, testified by the inscription telling about the victory of the II. Roman legion at Laugaricio (the Latin name of Trenčín) in 179 AD. The oldest building is a stone rotunda, plausibly founded in the Great Moravian period. In the midst of the 13th century the castle was the seat of the Baron Jakab Cseszneky, who was King Béla IV's swordbearer. Later in the 13-14th century, the castle became the residence of Matthew III Csák, the legendary "Lord of the river Váh and the Tatra Mountains". He gave name to the Máté Tower, a keep dominating both the castle silhouette as well as that of the town.

In 1335 the Treaty of Trentschin was concluded at the castle between King Casimir III of Poland, King Charles I of Hungary and King John of Bohemia. The negotiations were attended personally by king John of Bohemia, his son Charles (the future Holy Roman emperor Charles IV) and Charles I of Hungary. King of Poland Casimir III was represented by his deputies.

Within the precincts of the lower castle can be found the water well, also known as the "well of love". Which according to legend was dug by a Turkish prince called Omar, who had great love for the beautiful Fatima, whom he had to redeem by digging a well in the rock. In fact the well was dug by a garrison in the 16th century, it took them 40 years and is approximately 80 m deep.

== Present ==
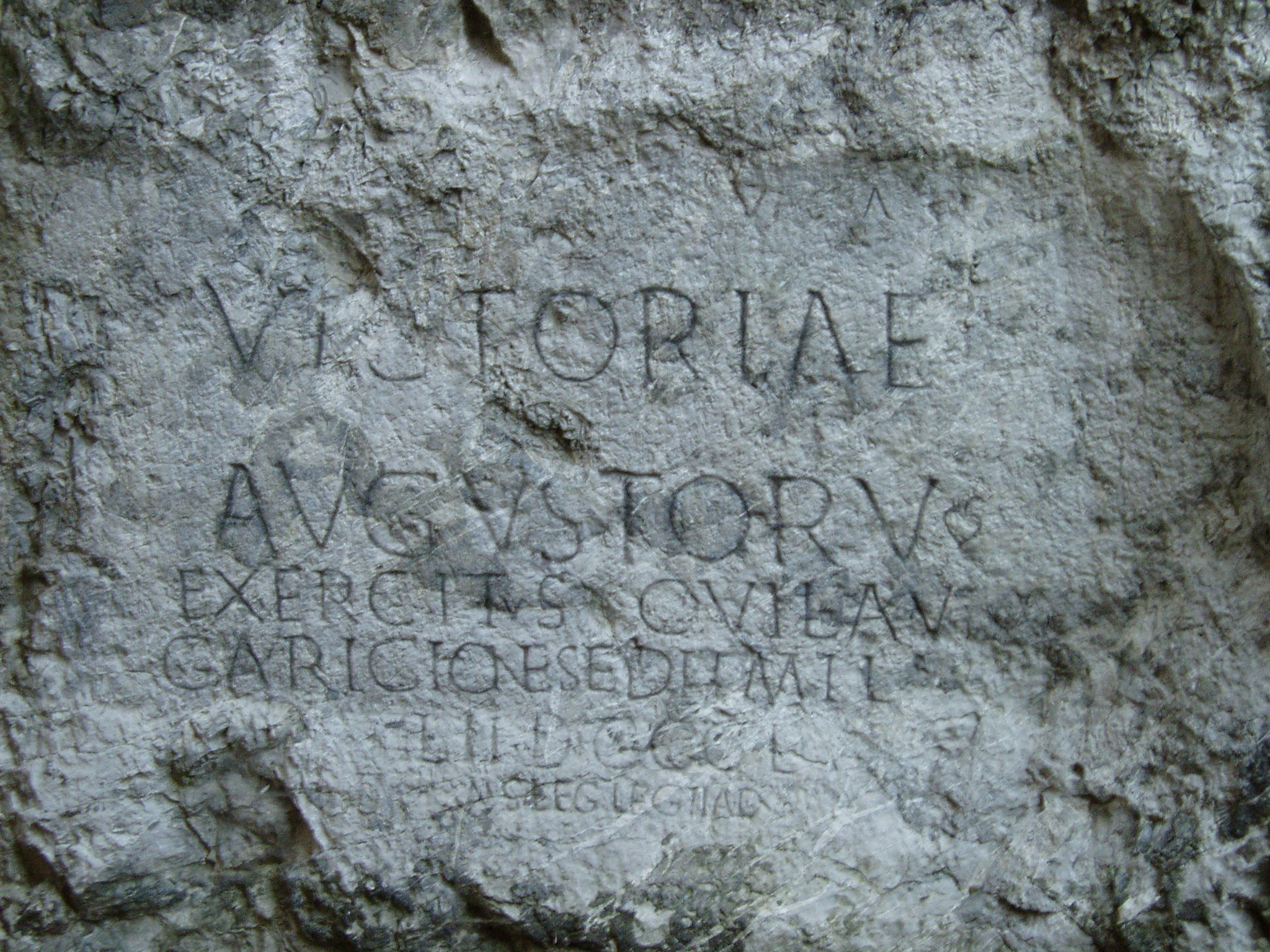
Roman writing on a rock below castle

The castle houses exhibitions of the Trenčín Museum, documenting the history of the region and of the castle – exhibitions of historic furniture, weapons, pictures and other artifacts as well as a castle gallery, archaeological collections and findings. The castle is protected as a National Cultural Monument of Slovakia. In 2006, it attracted about 100,000 visitors.
