= Mário Ostrčil =

Slovak canoeist

Mário Ostrčil (born November 30, 1978) is a Slovak sprint canoer who competed in the early 2000s. He was eliminated in the semifinals of both the C-2 500 m and the C-2 1000 m events at the 2000 Summer Olympics in Sydney.
