= Antonio Romero (canoeist) =

Mexican canoeist (born 1968)

Medal record

Men's canoe sprint

World Championships
Bronze medal – third place	1994 Mexico City	C-4 1000 m

José Antonio Romero (born April 16, 1968) is a Mexican sprint canoer who competed from the early 1990s to the early 2000s. He won a bronze medal in the C-4 1000 m event at the 1994 ICF Canoe Sprint World Championships in Mexico City.

Romero also competed in two Summer Olympics, earning his best finish of sixth in the C-2 1000 m event at Sydney in 2000.
