= Matthew Csák =

Matthew Csák or Máté Csák may refer to any of the following members of the genus of Csák:

- Matthew I Csák (d. 1245/1249)
- Matthew II Csák (c. 1235 – 1283/1284)
- Matthew III Csák (1260/65 – 1321)
