= Roman Bundz =

Ukrainian canoeist

Roman Bundz (born September 1, 1970 in Lviv, Ukrainian SSR) is a Ukrainian sprint canoer who competed from the mid-1990s to the early 2000s (decade). Competing in two Summer Olympics, he earned his best finish of seventh in the C-1 1000 m event at Atlanta in 1996.
